= Results of the 2024 Northern Territory general election =

This is a list of electoral division results from the 2024 Northern Territory general election.

== Results summary ==
Legislative Assembly (IRV) – (CV)
Party	Votes	%	+/–	Seats	+/–
Country Liberal	49,738	48.89	▲17.55	17	▲9
Labor	29,292	28.79	▼10.64	4	▼10
Independents	14,439	14.19	▲3.45	3	▲1
Greens	8,272	8.13	▲3.67	1	▲1
Total	101,741	100.00	–	25	–
Valid votes	101,741	96.99	+0.45		
Invalid/blank votes	3,160	3.01	−0.45		
Total votes	104,901	100.00	–		
Registered voters/turnout	153,248	68.45	−6.49		
Source: ABC News NTEC
Two-party-preferred vote
Country Liberal		57.4	▲10.4		
Labor		42.6	▼10.4		
Total					

The CLP swept Labor from power in a massive landslide, winning 58 percent of the two-party vote on a territory-wide swing of 11 percent. The swing was particularly pronounced in Darwin and Palmerston. The CLP took all of Palmerston and all but two seats in Darwin, all on swings of over 10 percent. Notably, the CLP took five out of seven seats in Darwin's northern suburbs, which had been Labor's power base in the Territory since the turn of the millennium. Labor won power for the first time in 2001 by sweeping the northern suburbs, and retained all but one seat there even when defeated in 2012. It initially appeared Natasha Fyles in Nightcliff would be the only Labor member left in the Darwin/Palmerston area, but the Greens narrowly defeated her to complete Labor's urban wipeout.

Lawler herself was defeated in Drysdale by CLP challenger Clinton Howe on a swing of over 21 percent, enough on paper to turn it into a safe CLP seat. She was the third head of government in the Territory and the fourth major-party leader to lose their own seat. All but two members of her cabinet were defeated, the only survivors being Deputy Chief Minister Chansey Paech and Selena Uibo.

== Results by electoral division ==
=== Arafura ===
2024 Northern Territory general election: Arafura
Party	Candidate	Votes	%	±%
Labor	Manuel Brown	1,887	69.7	+20.7
Country Liberal	Yanja Thompson	821	30.3	−9.8
Total formal votes		2,708	97.9	+3.1
Informal votes		57	2.1	−3.1
Turnout		2,765	44.6	−8.1
Labor hold		Swing	+16.1	

=== Araluen ===
2024 Northern Territory general election: Araluen
Party	Candidate	Votes	%	±%
Independent	Robyn Lambley	1,638	40.7	+11.5
Country Liberal	Sean Heenan	1,062	26.4	−11.6
Greens	Hugo Wells	666	16.6	+6.1
Labor	Gagandeep Sodhi	536	13.3	−4.7
Independent	Wayne Wright	119	3.0	+1.4
Total formal votes		4,021	96.5	−0.0
Informal votes		144	3.5	+0.0
Turnout		4,165	70.7	−8.0
Two-party-preferred result (Note: Estimated two-party-preferred count by Antony Green.)
Country Liberal	Sean Heenan	2,481	61.7	−0.9
Labor	Gagandeep Sodhi	1,540	38.3	+0.9
Two-candidate-preferred result
Independent	Robyn Lambley	2,603	64.7	+14.3
Country Liberal	Sean Heenan	1,418	35.3	−14.3
Independent hold		Swing	+14.3	

=== Arnhem ===
2024 Northern Territory general election: Arnhem
Party	Candidate	Votes	%	±%
Labor	Selena Uibo	2,162	64.3	+22.6
Country Liberal	Ian Mongunu Gumbula	1,202	35.7	+20.4
Total formal votes		3,364	97.3	
Informal votes		92	2.7	
Turnout		3,456	52.0	
Labor hold		Swing	−3.3	

=== Barkly ===
2024 Northern Territory general election: Barkly
Party	Candidate	Votes	%	±%
Country Liberal	Steve Edgington	1,571	51.9	+10.9
Labor	Lizzie Hogan	1,454	48.1	+10.0
Total formal votes		3,017	97.6	+1.9
Informal votes		75	2.4	−1.9
Turnout		3,100	50.7	
Country Liberal hold		Swing	+1.7	

=== Blain ===
2024 Northern Territory general election: Blain
Party	Candidate	Votes	%	±%
Country Liberal	Matthew Kerle	1,895	46.5	+12.9
Independent	Mark Turner	1,584	38.9	+38.9
Labor	Danielle Eveleigh	596	14.6	−25.9
Total formal votes		4,075	96.2	−0.1
Informal votes		161	3.8	+0.1
Turnout		4,236	65.8	
Two-party-preferred result
Country Liberal	Matthew Kerle	2,938	72.1	+23.4
Labor	Danielle Eveleigh	1,137	27.9	−23.4
Two-candidate-preferred result
Country Liberal	Matthew Kerle	2,106	52.0	+2.2
Independent	Mark Turner	1,946	48.0	+48.0
Country Liberal gain from Labor		Swing	+3.3	

=== Braitling ===
2024 Northern Territory general election: Braitling
Party	Candidate	Votes	%	±%
Country Liberal	Joshua Burgoyne	2,101	50.0	+14.8
Greens	Asta Hill	1,627	38.8	+30.1
Labor	Allison Bitar	469	11.2	−11.4
Total formal votes		4,198	97.4	−0.5
Informal votes		111	2.6	−0.5
Turnout		4,309	70.4	
Two-party-preferred result
Country Liberal	Joshua Burgoyne	2,445	58.2	+7.0
Labor	Allison Bitar	1,753	41.8	−7.0
Two-candidate-preferred result
Country Liberal	Joshua Burgoyne	2,261	53.9	+2.5
Greens	Asta Hill	1,937	46.1	+46.1
Country Liberal hold		Swing	+2.6	

=== Brennan ===
2024 Northern Territory general election: Brennan
Party	Candidate	Votes	%	±%
Country Liberal	Marie-Clare Boothby	3,529	73.9	+31.5
Labor	Tony Sievers	1,246	26.1	−13.8
Total formal votes		4,775	97.3	+0.2
Informal votes		132	2.7	−0.2
Turnout		4,907	78.7	
Country Liberal hold		Swing	+20.9	

=== Casuarina ===
2024 Northern Territory general election: Casuarina
Party	Candidate	Votes	%	±%
Country Liberal	Khoda Patel	2,055	44.1	+21.7
Labor	Lauren Moss	1,559	33.4	−17.8
Greens	Pamela McCalman	578	12.4	+1.5
Independent	Martin Jackson	472	10.1	+10.1
Total formal votes		4,664	96.9	−0.5
Informal votes		147	3.1	+0.5
Turnout		4,811	81.5	
Two-party-preferred result
Country Liberal	Khoda Patel	2,365	50.7	+16.7
Labor	Lauren Moss	2,281	49.3	−16.7
Country Liberal gain from Labor		Swing	+16.7	

=== Daly ===
2024 Northern Territory general election: Daly
Party	Candidate	Votes	%	±%
Labor	Dheran Young	2,323	52.3	+18.4
Country Liberal	Kris Civitarese	2,119	47.7	+11.7
Total formal votes		4,442	97.1	
Informal votes		131	2.9	
Turnout		4,573	73.4	
Labor hold		Swing	+3.8	

=== Drysdale ===
2024 Northern Territory general election: Drysdale
Party	Candidate	Votes	%	±%
Country Liberal	Clinton Howe	2,466	58.7	+28.4
Labor	Eva Lawler	1,254	29.8	−12.1
Independent	Cindy Mebbingarri Roberts	484	11.5	+11.5
Total formal votes		4,204	96.4	
Informal votes		156	3.6	
Turnout		4,360	68.7	
Two-party-preferred result
Country Liberal	Clinton Howe	2,732	65.0	+20.4
Labor	Eva Lawler	1,472	35.0	−20.4
Country Liberal gain from Labor		Swing	+20.4	

=== Fannie Bay ===
2024 Northern Territory general election: Fannie Bay
Party	Candidate	Votes	%	±%
Country Liberal	Laurie Zio	1,858	39.9	+6.8
Greens	Suki Dorras-Walker	1,340	28.7	+17.6
Labor	Brent Potter	1,276	27.4	−21.1
Independent	Leonard May	187	4.0	+4.0
Total formal votes		4,661	97.8	N/A
Informal votes		104	2.2	N/A
Turnout		4,765	77.5	N/A
Two-party-preferred result
Labor	Brent Potter	2,442	52.4	−8.5
Country Liberal	Laurie Zio	2,219	47.6	+8.5
Two-candidate-preferred result
Country Liberal	Laurie Zio	2,349	50.4	+11.3
Greens	Suki Dorras-Walker	2,312	49.6	+49.6
Country Liberal gain from Labor		Swing	N/A	

=== Fong Lim ===
2024 Northern Territory general election: Fong Lim
Party	Candidate	Votes	%	±%
Country Liberal	Tanzil Rahman	2,050	48.5	+12.1
Labor	Mark Monaghan	1,174	27.8	−14.0
Greens	Simon Niblock	672	15.9	+15.9
Independent	Amye Un	329	7.8	−2.2
Total formal votes		4,225	97.7	+0.2
Informal votes		118	2.7	−0.2
Turnout		4,343	76.5	
Two-party-preferred result
Country Liberal	Tanzil Rahman	2,428	57.5	+9.6
Labor	Mark Monaghan	1,791	42.5	−9.6
Country Liberal gain from Labor		Swing	+9.6	

=== Goyder ===
2024 Northern Territory general election: Goyder
Party	Candidate	Votes	%	±%
Country Liberal	Andrew Mackay	2,846	56.2	+28.8
Independent	Belinda Kolstad	1,049	20.7	+20.7
Labor	Sandy Griffin	691	13.7	+1.1
Independent	Mathew Salter	367	7.2	+7.2
Independent	Trevor Jenkins	109	2.2	+0.8
Total formal votes		5,062	96.7	+0.5
Informal votes		175	3.3	−0.6
Turnout		5,237	83.0	
Two-party-preferred result
Country Liberal	Andrew Mackay	3,819	75.4	+11.0
Labor	Sandy Griffin	1,245	24.6	−11.0
Two-candidate-preferred result
Country Liberal	Andrew Mackay	3,172	62.7	+19.4
Independent	Belinda Kolstad	1,890	37.3	+37.3
Country Liberal gain from Independent		Swing	+19.4	

=== Gwoja ===
2024 Northern Territory general election: Gwoja
Party	Candidate	Votes	%	±%
Labor	Chansey Paech	1,654	65.8	+5.9
Country Liberal	Jarrod Jupurula Williams	858	34.2	+7.9
Total formal votes		2,512	97.4	+2.6
Informal votes		68	2.6	−2.6
Turnout		2,580	42.1	
Labor hold		Swing	+1.1	

=== Johnston ===
2024 Northern Territory general election: Johnston
Party	Candidate	Votes	%	±%
Country Liberal	Gary Strachan	1,456	34.6	+14.3
Independent	Justine Davis	1,273	30.3	+30.3
Labor	Joel Bowden	1,108	26.3	−19.6
Greens	Billie Barton	370	8.8	−7.0
Total formal votes		4,207	98.2	+1.2
Informal votes		120	2.8	−1.2
Turnout		4,327	75.3	
Two-party-preferred result
Labor	Joel Bowden	2,224	52.9	−13.1
Country Liberal	Gary Strachan	1,983	47.1	+13.1
Two-candidate-preferred result
Independent	Justine Davis	2,425	57.6	+57.6
Country Liberal	Gary Strachan	1,782	42.4	+8.4
Independent gain from Labor		Swing	+57.6	

=== Karama ===
2024 Northern Territory general election: Karama
Party	Candidate	Votes	%	±%
Country Liberal	Brian O'Gallagher	2,060	49.7	+20.7
Labor	Ngaree Ah Kit	1,096	26.4	−22.8
Independent	Justine Glover	669	16.1	+16.1
Greens	Andy Rowan	322	7.8	+7.8
Total formal votes		4,127	96.1	−0.9
Informal votes		167	3.9	+0.9
Turnout		4,314	72.1	
Two-party-preferred result
Country Liberal	Brian O'Gallagher	2,542	61.3	+19.6
Labor	Ngaree Ah Kit	1,605	38.7	−19.6
Country Liberal gain from Labor		Swing	+19.6	

=== Katherine ===
2024 Northern Territory general election: Katherine
Party	Candidate	Votes	%	±%
Country Liberal	Jo Hersey	2,181	56.9	+24.4
Independent	Sam Phelan	1,071	28.0	+28.0
Labor	Nick Lovering	578	15.1	−17.9
Total formal votes		3,830	96.6	
Informal votes		136	3.4	
Turnout		3,966	64.2	
Two-party-preferred result
Country Liberal	Jo Hersey	2,673	69.8	+17.5
Labor	Nick Lovering	1,157	30.2	−17.5
Two-candidate-preferred result
Country Liberal	Jo Hersey	2,381	62.2	+9.6
Independent	Sam Phelan	1,449	37.8	+37.8
Country Liberal hold		Swing	+9.6	

=== Mulka ===
2024 Northern Territory general election: Mulka
Party	Candidate	Votes	%	±%
Independent	Yingiya Mark Guyula	2,299	75.2	+20.1
Country Liberal	Allen Fanning	758	24.8	+24.8
Total formal votes		3,057	97.1	−0.6
Informal votes		90	2.9	+0.6
Turnout		3,147	46.0	
Independent hold		Swing	+20.1	

=== Namatjira ===
2024 Northern Territory general election: Namatjira
Party	Candidate	Votes	%	±%
Country Liberal	Bill Yan	1,896	55.1	+25.5
Labor	Sheralee Taylor	874	25.4	−1.7
Greens	Blair McFarland	671	19.5	+11.8
Total formal votes		3,441	95.7	+0.5
Informal votes		154	4.3	−0.5
Turnout		3,595	55.2	
Two-party-preferred result
Country Liberal	Bill Yan	2,115	61.5	+11.2
Labor	Sheralee Taylor	1,326	38.5	−11.2
Country Liberal hold		Swing	+11.8	

=== Nelson ===
2024 Northern Territory general election: Nelson
Party	Candidate	Votes	%	±%
Country Liberal	Gerard Maley	3,653	71.6	+20.6
Independent	Beverley Ratahi	743	14.5	−13.3
Labor	Anthony Venes	708	13.9	+1.9
Total formal votes		5,104	97.2	+0.3
Informal votes		146	2.8	−0.3
Turnout		5,250	82.3	
Two-party-preferred result
Country Liberal	Gerard Maley	4,057	79.5	+7.2
Labor	Anthony Venes	1,047	20.5	−7.2
Two-candidate-preferred result
Country Liberal	Gerard Maley	3,949	77.4	+5.1
Independent	Beverley Ratahi	1,155	22.6	−5.1
Country Liberal hold		Swing	+5.1	

=== Nightcliff ===
2024 Northern Territory general election: Nightcliff
Party	Candidate	Votes	%	±%
Labor	Natasha Fyles	1,467	32.8	−20.0
Country Liberal	Helen Secretary	1,060	23.7	+5.0
Greens	Kat McNamara	981	22.0	+3.2
Independent	Mililma May	858	19.2	+19.2
Independent	George Mamouzellos	102	2.3	+2.3
Total formal votes		4,468	97.2	
Informal votes		127	2.8	
Turnout		4,595	81.3	
Estimated two-party-preferred result
Labor	Natasha Fyles	2,908	65.1	−9.0
Country Liberal	Helen Secretary	1,559	34.9	+9.0
Two-candidate-preferred result
Greens	Kat McNamara	2,252	50.4	+50.4
Labor	Natasha Fyles	2,216	49.6	−24.5
Greens gain from Labor				

=== Port Darwin ===
2024 Northern Territory general election: Port Darwin
Party	Candidate	Votes	%	±%
Country Liberal	Robyn Cahill	2,149	52.2	+14.4
Labor	Brian Manning	972	23.6	−13.9
Greens	Greg Dickson	681	16.5	+9.2
Independent	Leah Potter	234	5.7	+0.8
Independent	Janey Davies	83	2.0	+2.0
Total formal votes		4,119	97.1	−0.4
Informal votes		121	2.9	+0.4
Turnout		4,240	74.0	
Two-party-preferred result
Country Liberal	Robyn Cahill	2,543	61.7	+13.7
Labor	Brian Manning	1,576	38.3	−13.7
Country Liberal gain from Labor		Swing	+13.7	

=== Sanderson ===
2024 Northern Territory general election: Sanderson
Party	Candidate	Votes	%	±%
Country Liberal	Jinson Charls	2,311	52.2	+29.9
Labor	Kate Worden	2,116	47.8	−11.7
Total formal votes		4,427	96.7	−0.9
Informal votes		149	3.3	+0.9
Turnout		4,576	77.8	
Country Liberal gain from Labor		Swing	+21.0	

=== Spillett ===
2024 Northern Territory general election: Spillett
Party	Candidate	Votes	%	±%
Country Liberal	Lia Finocchiaro	3,712	79.6	+23.5
Labor	Caleb Burke	952	20.4	−12.5
Total formal votes		4,664	97.5	+0.2
Informal votes		121	2.5	−0.2
Turnout		4,785	78.5	
Country Liberal hold		Swing	+16.1	

=== Wanguri ===
2024 Northern Territory general election: Wanguri
Party	Candidate	Votes	%	±%
Country Liberal	Oly Carlson	2,069	47.7	+22.8
Labor	Shlok Sharma	1,139	26.2	−36.6
Independent	Graeme Sawyer	769	17.7	+17.7
Greens	Andrew Coates	364	8.4	+8.4
Total formal votes		4,341	96.5	−0.8
Informal votes		158	3.5	+0.8
Turnout		4,499	80.0	
Two-party-preferred result
Country Liberal	Oly Carlson	2,561	59.0	+26.3
Labor	Shlok Sharma	1,780	41.0	−26.3
Country Liberal gain from Labor		Swing	+26.3	

== Results by region ==
Two-party-preferred vote by region
Region	TPP		Swing (to CLP)
Region	ALP	CLP	Swing (to CLP)
Darwin CBD	44.7%	55.3%	+10.6
Northern Darwin	49.3%	50.7%	+17.6
Palmerston	27.1%	72.9%	+20.4
Greater Darwin	38.5%	61.5%	+16.1
Regional/Remote NT	48.4%	51.6%	+2.4
Total	41.6%	58.4%	+11.7
