= Electoral results for the division of Sanderson =

This is a list of electoral results for the Electoral division of Sanderson in Northern Territory elections.

== Members for Sanderson ==
Member	Party	Term
Liz Andrew	Country Liberal	1974–1977
June D'Rozario	Labor	1977–1983
Daryl Manzie	Country Liberal	1983–2001
Len Kiely	Labor	2001–2008
Peter Styles	Country Liberal	2008–2016
Kate Worden	Labor	2016–present

== Election results ==
=== Elections in the 1970s ===
1974 Northern Territory general election: Sanderson
Party	Candidate	Votes	%	±%
Country Liberal	Liz Andrew	797	41.5	N/A
Labor	Mark Phelan	661	34.5	N/A
Independent	Alexander Allan-Stewart; Herbert Sinclair	461	24.0	N/A
Total formal votes		1,919	96.6	N/A
Informal votes		68	3.4	N/A
Turnout		1,987	84.8	N/A
Two-party-preferred result
Country Liberal	Liz Andrew	1,006	56.5	N/A
Labor	Mark Phelan	773	43.5	N/A
Country Liberal win		(new seat)		

- The number of votes each individual Independent received is unknown.

1977 Northern Territory general election: Sanderson
Party	Candidate	Votes	%	±%
Labor	June D'Rozario	984	45.6	+11.1
Country Liberal	Liz Andrew	565	26.1	–15.4
Independent	Kitty Fischer; Herbert Sinclair	428	19.8	N/A
Progress	Geoffrey Bennett	182	8.4	N/A
Total formal votes		2,159	98.5	N/A
Informal votes		32	1.5	N/A
Turnout		2,191	92.4	N/A
Two-party-preferred result
Labor	June D'Rozario	1,258	58.3	+14.8
Country Liberal	Liz Andrew	901	41.7	–14.8
Labor gain from Country Liberal		Swing		

- The number of votes each individual Independent received is unknown.

=== Elections in the 1980s ===
1980 Northern Territory general election: Sanderson
Party	Candidate	Votes	%	±%
Labor	June D'Rozario	1,866	48.6	+3.0
Country Liberal	Daryl Manzie	1,851	48.2	+22.1
Christian Democrats (NT)	Ron Mann	125	3.3	+3.3
Total formal votes		3,842	98.2	N/A
Informal votes		70	1.8	N/A
Turnout		3,912	84.5	N/A
Two-party-preferred result
Labor	June D'Rozario	1,930	50.2	−8.1
Country Liberal	Daryl Manzie	1,912	49.8	+8.1
Labor hold		Swing		

1983 Northern Territory general election: Sanderson
Party	Candidate	Votes	%	±%
Country Liberal	Daryl Manzie	1,180	54.8	+6.6
Labor	June D'Rozario	973	45.2	−3.4
Total formal votes		2,153	97.8	N/A
Informal votes		49	2.2	N/A
Turnout		2,202	89.8	N/A
Country Liberal gain from Labor		Swing		

1987 Northern Territory general election: Sanderson
Party	Candidate	Votes	%	±%
Country Liberal	Daryl Manzie	1,086	45.7	−9.1
Labor	Peter McQueen	917	38.6	−6.6
NT Nationals	Lawrence Armstrong	372	15.7	+15.7
Total formal votes		2,375	96.5	N/A
Informal votes		85	3.5	N/A
Turnout		2,460	85.8	N/A
Two-party-preferred result
Country Liberal	Daryl Manzie	1,368	57.6	+3.6
Labor	Peter McQueen	1,007	42.4	−3.6
Country Liberal hold		Swing	+3.6	

=== Elections in the 1990s ===
1990 Northern Territory general election: Sanderson
Party	Candidate	Votes	%	±%
Country Liberal	Daryl Manzie	1,547	53.9	+8.2
Labor	Alan Perrin	906	31.5	−7.1
Independent	Andrew Wrenn	229	8.0	+8.0
Greens	Graeme Parsons	190	6.6	+6.6
Total formal votes		2,872	98.2	N/A
Informal votes		52	1.8	N/A
Turnout		2,924	86.9	N/A
Two-party-preferred result
Country Liberal	Daryl Manzie	1,675	59.0	+1.5
Labor	Alan Perrin	1,117	41.0	−1.5
Country Liberal hold		Swing	+1.5	

1994 Northern Territory general election: Sanderson
Party	Candidate	Votes	%	±%
Country Liberal	Daryl Manzie	1,699	57.1	+3.2
Labor	Denise Horvath	1,274	42.9	+11.4
Total formal votes		2,973	96.8	N/A
Informal votes		98	3.2	N/A
Turnout		3,071	86.9	N/A
Country Liberal hold		Swing	−1.9	

1997 Northern Territory general election: Sanderson
Party	Candidate	Votes	%	±%
Country Liberal	Daryl Manzie	1,992	59.3	+2.2
Labor	Michael Atkinson	1,369	40.7	−2.2
Total formal votes		3,361	94.5	N/A
Informal votes		196	5.5	N/A
Turnout		3,557	83.7	N/A
Country Liberal hold		Swing	+2.2	

=== Elections in the 2000s ===
2001 Northern Territory general election: Sanderson
Party	Candidate	Votes	%	±%
Labor	Len Kiely	1,629	44.1	+6.0
Country Liberal	Peter Poniris	1,530	41.4	−17.1
Independent	Gary Haslett	408	11.0	+11.0
Territory Alliance	Susan Murdoch	130	3.5	+3.5
Total formal votes		3,697	96.1	N/A
Informal votes		150	3.9	N/A
Turnout		3,847	87.4	N/A
Two-party-preferred result
Labor	Len Kiely	1,959	53.0	+12.9
Country Liberal	Peter Poniris	1,738	47.0	−12.9
Labor gain from Country Liberal		Swing	+12.9	

2005 Northern Territory general election: Sanderson
Party	Candidate	Votes	%	±%
Labor	Len Kiely	2,204	58.4	+14.4
Country Liberal	Peter Styles	1,569	41.6	+0.2
Total formal votes		3,773	96.2	N/A
Informal votes		150	3.8	N/A
Turnout		3,923	89.4	N/A
Labor hold		Swing	+5.4	

2008 Northern Territory general election: Sanderson
Party	Candidate	Votes	%	±%
Country Liberal	Peter Styles	2,231	56.4	+16.4
Labor	Len Kiely	1,723	43.6	−16.4
Total formal votes		3,954	94.1	N/A
Informal votes		247	5.9	N/A
Turnout		4,201	86.6	N/A
Country Liberal gain from Labor		Swing	+16.4	

=== Elections in the 2010s ===
2012 Northern Territory general election: Sanderson
Party	Candidate	Votes	%	±%
Country Liberal	Peter Styles	2,214	50.9	−5.6
Labor	Jodie Green	1,872	43.0	−0.6
Sex Party	Jillian Briggs	176	4.0	+4.0
First Nations	Dimitrious Magriplis	90	2.1	+2.1
Total formal votes		4,352	97.1	N/A
Informal votes		132	2.9	N/A
Turnout		4,484	87.7	N/A
Two-party-preferred result
Country Liberal	Peter Styles	2,312	53.1	−3.3
Labor	Jodie Green	2,040	46.9	+3.3
Country Liberal hold		Swing	−3.3	

2016 Northern Territory general election: Sanderson
Party	Candidate	Votes	%	±%
Labor	Kate Worden	2,323	52.3	+9.3
Country Liberal	Peter Styles	1,573	35.4	−15.5
Independent	Andrew Arthur	331	7.4	+7.4
1 Territory	Trudi Andersson	135	3.0	+3.0
Independent	Thomas Lynch	81	1.8	+1.8
Total formal votes		4,443	98.6	N/A
Informal votes		63	1.4	N/A
Turnout		4,506	81.2	N/A
Two-party-preferred result
Labor	Kate Worden	2,578	60.5	+13.6
Country Liberal	Peter Styles	1,680	39.5	−13.6
Labor gain from Country Liberal		Swing	+13.6	

=== Elections in the 2020s ===
2020 Northern Territory general election: Sanderson
Party	Candidate	Votes	%	±%
Labor	Kate Worden	2,632	59.9	+7.6
Country Liberal	Derek Mayger	968	22.0	−13.4
Territory Alliance	Amelia Nuku	795	18.1	+18.1
Total formal votes		4,395	97.6	N/A
Informal votes		107	2.4	N/A
Turnout		4,502	82.6	N/A
Two-party-preferred result
Labor	Kate Worden	3,044	69.3	+8.7
Country Liberal	Derek Mayger	1,351	30.7	−8.7
Labor hold		Swing	+8.7	

2024 Northern Territory general election: Sanderson
Party	Candidate	Votes	%	±%
Country Liberal	Jinson Charls	2,311	52.2	+29.9
Labor	Kate Worden	2,116	47.8	−11.7
Total formal votes		4,427	96.7	−0.9
Informal votes		149	3.3	+0.9
Turnout		4,576	77.8	
Country Liberal gain from Labor		Swing	+21.0	
