= Electoral results for the division of Blain =

This is a list of electoral results for the Electoral division of Blain in Northern Territory elections.

== Members for Blain ==
Member	Party	Term
Barry Coulter	Country Liberal	1997–1999
Terry Mills	Country Liberal	1999–2014
Nathan Barrett	Country Liberal	2014–2016
Nathan Barrett	Independent	2016
Terry Mills	Independent	2016–2019
Terry Mills	Territory Alliance	2019–2020
Mark Turner	Labor	2020–present

== Election results ==
=== Elections in the 1990s ===
1997 Northern Territory general election: Blain
Party	Candidate	Votes	%	±%
Country Liberal	Barry Coulter	2,491	73.8	+14.7
Labor	Richard Bawden	884	26.2	−8.2
Total formal votes		3,375	92.9	N/A
Informal votes		257	7.1	N/A
Turnout		3,632	88.8	N/A
Country Liberal hold		Swing	+11.8	

1999 Blain by-election
Party	Candidate	Votes	%	±%
Country Liberal	Terry Mills	1,599	46.4	−27.4
Labor	Nicole Cridland	1,396	40.5	+14.3
Independent	Peter Gandolfi	352	10.2	+10.2
Greens	Beryl Brugmans	101	2.9	+2.9
Total formal votes		3,448	96.6	N/A
Informal votes		122	3.4	N/A
Turnout		3,570	77.4	N/A
Two-party-preferred result
Country Liberal	Terry Mills	1,838	53.3	−20.5
Labor	Nicole Cridland	1,610	46.7	+20.5
Country Liberal hold		Swing	−20.5	

=== Elections in the 2000s ===
2001 Northern Territory general election: Blain
Party	Candidate	Votes	%	±%
Country Liberal	Terry Mills	2,342	64.0	−10.1
Labor	Peter Shew	1,072	29.3	+3.4
Territory Alliance (2001)	Joseph Mulqueeney	248	6.8	+6.8
Total formal votes		3,662	96.2	N/A
Informal votes		146	3.8	N/A
Turnout		3,808	87.5	N/A
Two-party-preferred result
Country Liberal	Terry Mills	2,444	66.7	−7.4
Labor	Peter Shew	1,218	33.3	+7.4
Country Liberal hold		Swing	−7.4	

2005 Northern Territory general election: Blain
Party	Candidate	Votes	%	±%
Country Liberal	Terry Mills	1,933	51.9	−12.1
Labor	Brendan Cabry	1,415	38.0	+8.7
Greens	Sue McKinnon	273	7.3	+7.3
Independent	Duncan Dean	104	2.8	+2.8
Total formal votes		3,725	96.5	N/A
Informal votes		136	3.5	N/A
Turnout		3,861	86.3	N/A
Two-party-preferred result
Country Liberal	Terry Mills	2,131	57.2	−9.5
Labor	Brendan Cabry	1,594	42.8	+9.5
Country Liberal hold		Swing	−9.5	

2008 Northern Territory general election: Blain
Party	Candidate	Votes	%	±%
Country Liberal	Terry Mills	2,258	61.6	+5.8
Labor	Ken Vowles	1,410	38.4	−5.8
Total formal votes		3,668	94.9	N/A
Informal votes		198	5.1	N/A
Turnout		3,866	80.1	N/A
Country Liberal hold		Swing	+5.8	

=== Elections in the 2010s ===
2012 Northern Territory general election: Blain
Party	Candidate	Votes	%	±%
Country Liberal	Terry Mills	2,462	61.6	±0.0
Labor	Geoff Bahnert	1,343	33.6	−4.9
First Nations	Daniel Fejo	194	4.9	+4.9
Total formal votes		3,999	96.6	N/A
Informal votes		142	3.4	N/A
Turnout		4,141	83.2	N/A
Two-party-preferred result
Country Liberal	Terry Mills	2,529	63.2	+1.7
Labor	Geoff Bahnert	1,470	36.8	−1.7
Country Liberal hold		Swing	+1.7	

2014 Blain by-election
Party	Candidate	Votes	%	±%
Country Liberal	Nathan Barrett	1,768	45.5	−16.0
Labor	Geoff Bahnert	1,448	37.3	+3.7
Independent	Matthew Cranitch	336	8.7	+8.7
Greens	Sue McKinnon	275	7.1	+7.1
Citizens Electoral Council	Peter Flynn	56	1.4	+1.4
Total formal votes		3,883	95.5	N/A
Informal votes		184	4.5	N/A
Turnout		4,067	68.8	N/A
Two-party-preferred result
Country Liberal	Nathan Barrett	2,067	53.2	−10.0
Labor	Geoff Bahnert	1,816	46.8	+10.0
Country Liberal hold		Swing	−10.0	

2016 Northern Territory general election: Blain
Party	Candidate	Votes	%	±%
Labor	Damian Hale	1,597	37.3	+5.3
Independent	Terry Mills	1,341	31.3	+31.3
Country Liberal	Marie-Clare Boothby	1,102	25.7	−37.9
Independent	Gregory Knowles	241	5.6	+5.6
Total formal votes		4,280	97.3	N/A
Informal votes		121	2.7	N/A
Turnout		4,402	78.9	N/A
Two-party-preferred result
Labor	Damian Hale	2,056	54.8	+20.0
Country Liberal	Marie-Clare Boothby	1,693	45.2	−20.0
Two-candidate-preferred result
Independent	Terry Mills	1,953	51.4	+51.4
Labor	Damian Hale	1,849	48.6	+13.8
Independent gain from Country Liberal		Swing	N/A	

=== Elections in the 2020s ===
2020 Northern Territory general election: Blain
Party	Candidate	Votes	%	±%
Labor	Mark Turner	1,729	41.4	+4.0
Country Liberal	Matthew Kerle	1,489	35.6	+10.2
Territory Alliance	Terry Mills	959	23.0	−8.5
Total formal votes		4,177	96.8	N/A
Informal votes		138	3.2	N/A
Turnout		4,315	75.8	N/A
Two-party-preferred result
Labor	Mark Turner	2,095	50.2	+1.5
Country Liberal	Matthew Kerle	2,082	49.8	−1.5
Labor gain from Territory Alliance		Swing	+1.5	

2024 Northern Territory general election: Blain
Party	Candidate	Votes	%	±%
Country Liberal	Matthew Kerle	1,895	46.5	+12.9
Independent	Mark Turner	1,584	38.9	+38.9
Labor	Danielle Eveleigh	596	14.6	−25.9
Total formal votes		4,075	96.2	−0.1
Informal votes		161	3.8	+0.1
Turnout		4,236	65.8	
Two-party-preferred result (Note: Estimated two-party-preferred count by Antony Green.)
Country Liberal	Matthew Kerle	2,938	72.1	+23.4
Labor	Danielle Eveleigh	1,137	27.9	−23.4
Two-candidate-preferred result
Country Liberal	Matthew Kerle	2,106	52.0	+2.2
Independent	Mark Turner	1,946	48.0	+48.0
Country Liberal gain from Labor		Swing	+3.3	
