= Electoral results for the division of Brennan =

This is a list of electoral results for the Electoral division of Brennan in Northern Territory elections.

== Members for Brennan ==
Member	Party	Term
Max Ortmann	Country Liberal	1990–1994
Max Ortmann	Independent	1994–1994
Denis Burke	Country Liberal	1994–2005
James Burke	Labor	2005–2008
Peter Chandler	Country Liberal	2008–2016
Tony Sievers	Labor	2016–2020
Marie-Clare Boothby	Country Liberal	2020–present

== Election results ==
=== Elections in the 1990s ===
1990 Northern Territory general election: Brennan
Party	Candidate	Votes	%	±%
Country Liberal	Max Ortmann	1,139	44.4	+3.6
Labor	Ian Fraser	800	31.2	+6.7
Independent	Col Firmin	626	24.4	+24.4
Total formal votes		2,565	96.8	N/A
Informal votes		85	3.2	N/A
Turnout		2,650	80.4	N/A
Two-party-preferred result
Country Liberal	Max Ortmann	1,541	60.1	−5.9
Labor	Ian Fraser	1,024	39.9	+5.9
Country Liberal hold		Swing	−5.9	

1994 Northern Territory general election: Brennan
Party	Candidate	Votes	%	±%
Country Liberal	Denis Burke	1,660	52.4	+8.0
Labor	Geoffrey Carter	1,079	34.1	+2.9
Independent	Max Ortmann	428	13.5	+13.5
Total formal votes		3,167	96.4	N/A
Informal votes		117	3.6	N/A
Turnout		3,284	82.2	N/A
Two-party-preferred result
Country Liberal	Denis Burke	1,960	61.9	+1.8
Labor	Geoffrey Carter	1,207	38.1	−1.8
Country Liberal hold		Swing	+1.8	

1997 Northern Territory general election: Brennan
Party	Candidate	Votes	%	±%
Country Liberal	Denis Burke	2,747	74.3	+21.9
Labor	Stephen Bennett	950	25.7	−8.4
Total formal votes		3,697	94.3	N/A
Informal votes		222	5.7	N/A
Turnout		3,919	86.7	N/A
Country Liberal hold		Swing	+13.3	

=== Elections in the 2000s ===
2001 Northern Territory general election: Brennan
Party	Candidate	Votes	%	±%
Country Liberal	Denis Burke	2,369	63.1	−12.0
Labor	Simon Hall	887	23.6	−1.3
Independent	Duncan Dean	501	13.3	+13.3
Total formal votes		3,757	96.1	N/A
Informal votes		154	3.9	N/A
Turnout		3,911	81.2	N/A
Two-party-preferred result
Country Liberal	Denis Burke	2,564	68.2	−6.8
Labor	Simon Hall	1,193	31.8	+6.8
Country Liberal hold		Swing	−6.8	

2005 Northern Territory general election: Brennan
Party	Candidate	Votes	%	±%
Labor	James Burke	1,656	44.7	+21.6
Country Liberal	Denis Burke	1,638	44.2	−19.6
Independent	Nelly Riley	413	11.1	+11.1
Total formal votes		3,707	96.8	N/A
Informal votes		121	3.2	N/A
Turnout		3,828	84.4	N/A
Two-party-preferred result
Labor	James Burke	1,922	51.8	+20.8
Country Liberal	Denis Burke	1,785	48.2	−20.8
Labor gain from Country Liberal		Swing	+20.8	

2008 Northern Territory general election: Brennan
Party	Candidate	Votes	%	±%
Country Liberal	Peter Chandler	2,009	52.6	+3.3
Labor	James Burke	1,807	47.4	−3.3
Total formal votes		3,816	95.7	N/A
Informal votes		170	4.3	N/A
Turnout		3,986	80.3	N/A
Country Liberal gain from Labor		Swing	+3.3	

=== Elections in the 2010s ===
2012 Northern Territory general election: Brennan
Party	Candidate	Votes	%	±%
Country Liberal	Peter Chandler	2,683	64.2	+11.6
Labor	Russell Jeffrey	1,493	35.8	−11.6
Total formal votes		4,176	97.7	N/A
Informal votes		99	2.3	N/A
Turnout		4,275	84.5	N/A
Country Liberal hold		Swing	+11.6	

2016 Northern Territory general election: Brennan
Party	Candidate	Votes	%	±%
Labor	Tony Sievers	1,939	48.0	+12.0
Country Liberal	Peter Chandler	1,784	44.2	−19.8
1 Territory	Dorothy Fox	314	7.8	+7.8
Total formal votes		4,037	97.1	N/A
Informal votes		122	2.9	N/A
Turnout		4,159	79.9	N/A
Two-party-preferred result
Labor	Tony Sievers	2,077	52.6	+16.6
Country Liberal	Peter Chandler	1,869	47.4	−16.6
Labor gain from Country Liberal		Swing	+16.6	

=== Elections in the 2020s ===
2020 Northern Territory general election: Brennan
Party	Candidate	Votes	%	±%
Labor	Tony Sievers	1,760	40.2	−7.2
Country Liberal	Marie-Clare Boothby	1,730	39.5	−3.9
Territory Alliance	Abraham Mbemap	477	10.9	+10.9
Independent	Peter Chandler	413	9.4	+9.4
Total formal votes		4,380	96.8	N/A
Informal votes		146	3.2	N/A
Turnout		4,526	78.8	N/A
Two-party-preferred result
Country Liberal	Marie-Clare Boothby	2,242	51.2	+3.8
Labor	Tony Sievers	2,138	48.8	−3.8
Country Liberal gain from Labor		Swing	+3.8	

2024 Northern Territory general election: Brennan
Party	Candidate	Votes	%	±%
Country Liberal	Marie-Clare Boothby	3,529	73.9	+31.5
Labor	Tony Sievers	1,246	26.1	−13.8
Total formal votes		4,775	97.3	+0.2
Informal votes		132	2.7	−0.2
Turnout		4,907	78.7	
Country Liberal hold		Swing	+20.9	
