= Electoral results for the division of Karama =

This is a list of electoral results for the Electoral division of Karama in Northern Territory elections.

== Members for Karama ==
Member	Party	Term
Mick Palmer	Country Liberal	1987–2001
Delia Lawrie	Labor	2001–2015
Delia Lawrie	Independent	2015–2016
Ngaree Ah Kit	Labor	2016–present

== Election results ==
=== Elections in the 1980s ===
1987 Northern Territory general election: Karama
Party	Candidate	Votes	%	±%
Country Liberal	Mick Palmer	1,076	42.7	N/A
Labor	Robyn Crompton	959	38.1	N/A
NT Nationals	Lionel Preston	483	19.2	N/A
Total formal votes		2,518	94.4	N/A
Informal votes		149	5.6	N/A
Turnout		2,667	79.3	N/A
Two-party-preferred result
Country Liberal	Mick Palmer	1,423	56.5	N/A
Labor	Robyn Crompton	1,095	43.5	N/A
Country Liberal hold		Swing	−9.5	

=== Elections in the 1990s ===
1990 Northern Territory general election: Karama
Party	Candidate	Votes	%	±%
Country Liberal	Mick Palmer	1,533	55.3	+12.6
Labor	Margaret Gillespie	1,037	37.4	−0.7
NT Nationals	Janet Durling	200	7.2	−12.0
Total formal votes		2,770	97.0	N/A
Informal votes		87	3.0	N/A
Turnout		2,857	86.1	N/A
Two-party-preferred result
Country Liberal	Mick Palmer	1,683	60.8	+3.6
Labor	Margaret Gillespie	1,087	39.2	−3.6
Country Liberal hold		Swing	+3.6	

1994 Northern Territory general election: Karama
Party	Candidate	Votes	%	±%
Country Liberal	Mick Palmer	1,533	50.8	−4.5
Labor	John Tobin	1,320	43.7	+6.3
Independent	Christopher Inskip	107	3.6	+3.6
Democrats	Goncalo Pinto	58	1.9	+1.9
Total formal votes		3,018	96.6	N/A
Informal votes		107	3.4	N/A
Turnout		3,125	86.7	N/A
Two-party-preferred result
Country Liberal	Mick Palmer	1,640	54.3	−6.5
Labor	John Tobin	1,378	45.7	+6.5
Country Liberal hold		Swing	−6.5	

1997 Northern Territory general election: Karama
Party	Candidate	Votes	%	±%
Country Liberal	Mick Palmer	1,811	51.7	+0.9
Labor	John Tobin	1,692	48.3	+4.6
Total formal votes		3,503	95.8	N/A
Informal votes		154	4.2	N/A
Turnout		3,657	85.5	N/A
Country Liberal hold		Swing	−1.3	

=== Elections in the 2000s ===
2001 Northern Territory general election: Karama
Party	Candidate	Votes	%	±%
Labor	Delia Lawrie	1,990	53.7	+6.4
Country Liberal	Mick Palmer	1,713	46.3	−6.4
Total formal votes		3,703	95.8	N/A
Informal votes		161	4.2	N/A
Turnout		3,864	90.2	N/A
Labor gain from Country Liberal		Swing	+6.3	

2005 Northern Territory general election: Karama
Party	Candidate	Votes	%	±%
Labor	Delia Lawrie	2,445	67.0	+13.3
Country Liberal	Trevor Sellick	1,205	33.0	−13.3
Total formal votes		3,650	94.9	N/A
Informal votes		198	5.1	N/A
Turnout		3,848	89.1	N/A
Labor hold		Swing	+13.3	

2008 Northern Territory general election: Karama
Party	Candidate	Votes	%	±%
Labor	Delia Lawrie	2,234	56.1	−9.5
Country Liberal	Tony Bacus	1,398	35.1	+1.5
Independent	Natalie Hunter	192	4.8	+4.8
Independent	Dorothy Fox	156	3.9	+3.9
Total formal votes		3,980	96.0	N/A
Informal votes		167	4.0	N/A
Turnout		4,147	84.0	N/A
Two-party-preferred result
Labor	Delia Lawrie	2,420	60.8	−5.2
Country Liberal	Tony Bacus	1,560	39.2	+5.2
Labor hold		Swing	−5.2	

=== Elections in the 2010s ===
2012 Northern Territory general election: Karama
Party	Candidate	Votes	%	±%
Labor	Delia Lawrie	2,072	52.7	−3.5
Country Liberal	Rohan Kelly	1,634	41.5	+6.6
Greens	Frances Elcoate	229	5.8	+5.8
Total formal votes		3,935	96.4	N/A
Informal votes		145	3.6	N/A
Turnout		4,080	86.6	N/A
Two-party-preferred result
Labor	Delia Lawrie	2,219	56.4	−4.4
Country Liberal	Rohan Kelly	1,716	43.6	+4.4
Labor hold		Swing	−4.4	

2016 Northern Territory general election: Karama
Party	Candidate	Votes	%	±%
Labor	Ngaree Ah Kit	1,373	34.0	−18.7
Independent	Delia Lawrie	1,316	32.6	+32.6
Country Liberal	Jarred Ilett	923	22.8	−18.7
1 Territory	Edward D'Solo	249	6.2	+6.2
Independent	Trevor Jenkins	79	2.0	+2.0
Independent	Sonja Jebbink	56	1.4	+1.4
Independent	Jimmy Gimini	44	1.1	+1.1
Total formal votes		4,040	97.7	N/A
Informal votes		93	2.3	N/A
Turnout		4,133	79.1	N/A
Two-party-preferred result
Labor	Ngaree Ah Kit	2,037	63.0	+6.6
Country Liberal	Jarred Ilett	1,196	37.0	−6.6
Two-candidate-preferred result
Labor	Ngaree Ah Kit	1,702	50.8	−5.6
Independent	Delia Lawrie	1,647	49.2	+49.2
Labor hold		Swing	N/A	

=== Elections in the 2020s ===
2020 Northern Territory general election: Karama
Party	Candidate	Votes	%	±%
Labor	Ngaree Ah Kit	2,129	51.1	+17.2
Country Liberal	Brian O'Gallagher	1,166	28.0	+4.4
Territory Alliance	Caleb Cardno	874	21.0	+21.0
Total formal votes		4,169	97.1	N/A
Informal votes		124	2.9	N/A
Turnout		4,293	78.3	N/A
Two-party-preferred result
Labor	Ngaree Ah Kit	2,491	59.8	−2.5
Country Liberal	Brian O'Gallagher	1,678	40.2	+2.5
Labor hold		Swing	−2.5	

2024 Northern Territory general election: Karama
Party	Candidate	Votes	%	±%
Country Liberal	Brian O'Gallagher	2,060	49.7	+20.7
Labor	Ngaree Ah Kit	1,096	26.4	−22.8
Independent	Justine Glover	669	16.1	+16.1
Greens	Andy Rowan	322	7.8	+7.8
Total formal votes		4,127	96.1	−0.9
Informal votes		167	3.9	+0.9
Turnout		4,314	72.1	
Two-party-preferred result
Country Liberal	Brian O'Gallagher	2,542	61.3	+19.6
Labor	Ngaree Ah Kit	1,605	38.7	−19.6
Country Liberal gain from Labor		Swing	+19.6	
