= Electoral results for the division of Daly =

This is a list of electoral results for the Electoral division of Daly in Northern Territory elections.

== Members for Daly ==
Member	Party	Term
Tim Baldwin	Country Liberal	2001–2005
Rob Knight	Labor	2005–2012
Gary Higgins	Country Liberal	2012–2020
Ian Sloan	Country Liberal	2020–2021
Dheran Young	Labor	2021–present

== Election results ==
=== Elections in the 2000s ===
2001 Northern Territory general election: Daly
Party	Candidate	Votes	%	±%
Country Liberal	Tim Baldwin	1,489	57.2	−6.6
Labor	Rob Knight	866	33.3	−1.6
One Nation	Wayne Norris	154	5.9	+5.9
Democrats	Frank Spry	94	3.6	+3.6
Total formal votes		2,603	92.8	N/A
Informal votes		201	7.2	N/A
Turnout		2,804	74.6	N/A
Two-party-preferred result
Country Liberal	Tim Baldwin	1,609	61.8	−2.5
Labor	Rob Knight	994	38.2	+2.5
Country Liberal hold		Swing	−2.5	

2005 Northern Territory general election: Daly
Party	Candidate	Votes	%	±%
Labor	Rob Knight	1,842	53.1	+18.6
Country Liberal	Debbi Aloisi	980	28.2	−26.7
Independent	Dale Seaniger	489	14.1	+14.1
Greens	Elke Stegemann	159	4.6	+4.6
Total formal votes		3,470	95.0	N/A
Informal votes		181	5.0	N/A
Turnout		3,651	77.6	N/A
Two-party-preferred result
Labor	Rob Knight	2,249	64.8	+24.3
Country Liberal	Debbi Aloisi	1,221	35.2	−24.3
Labor gain from Country Liberal		Swing	+24.3	

2008 Northern Territory general election: Daly
Party	Candidate	Votes	%	±%
Labor	Rob Knight	1,541	46.9	−6.5
Country Liberal	Wayne Connop	1,212	36.9	+10.5
Greens	David Pollock	292	8.9	+3.9
Independent	August Stevens	240	7.3	+7.3
Total formal votes		3,285	95.3	N/A
Informal votes		162	4.7	N/A
Turnout		3,447	73.9	N/A
Two-party-preferred result
Labor	Rob Knight	1,827	55.6	−10.2
Country Liberal	Wayne Connop	1,458	44.4	+10.2
Labor hold		Swing	−10.2	

=== Elections in the 2010s ===
2012 Northern Territory general election: Daly
Party	Candidate	Votes	%	±%
Country Liberal	Gary Higgins	1,892	51.1	+14.2
Labor	Rob Knight	1,445	39.0	−7.9
Greens	David Pollock	187	5.1	−3.8
First Nations	Bill Risk	109	2.9	+2.9
	Trevor Jenkins	68	1.8	+1.8
Total formal votes		3,701	94.5	N/A
Informal votes		214	5.5	N/A
Turnout		3,915	73.5	N/A
Two-party-preferred result
Country Liberal	Gary Higgins	2,025	54.7	+10.5
Labor	Rob Knight	1,676	45.3	−10.5
Country Liberal gain from Labor		Swing	−4.9	

2016 Northern Territory general election: Daly
Party	Candidate	Votes	%	±%
Country Liberal	Gary Higgins	1,583	42.4	−9.2
Labor	Anthony Venes	1,361	36.5	−2.1
1 Territory	Joan Growden	246	6.6	+6.6
Independent	Allan McKay	166	4.5	+4.5
Independent	Regina McCarthy	128	3.4	+3.4
Independent	Kevin Wanganeen	119	3.2	+3.2
Independent	Thong Sum Lee	90	2.4	+2.4
Citizens Electoral Council	Ian Barry	37	1.0	+1.0
Total formal votes		3,730	97.5	N/A
Informal votes		94	2.5	N/A
Turnout		3,824	71.0	N/A
Two-party-preferred result
Country Liberal	Gary Higgins	1,763	52.1	−3.1
Labor	Anthony Venes	1,622	47.9	+3.1
Country Liberal hold		Swing	−3.1	

=== Elections in the 2020s ===
2020 Northern Territory general election: Daly
Party	Candidate	Votes	%	±%
Country Liberal	Ian Sloan	1,386	35.8	−6.1
Labor	Anthony Venes	1,321	34.1	−2.7
Territory Alliance	Regina McCarthy	708	18.3	+18.3
Greens	Will Kemp	324	8.4	+8.4
Independent	Mick Denigan	135	3.5	+3.5
Total formal votes		3,874	93.8	N/A
Informal votes		257	6.2	N/A
Turnout		4,131	73.5	N/A
Two-party-preferred result
Country Liberal	Ian Sloan	1,984	51.2	−0.5
Labor	Anthony Venes	1,890	48.8	+0.5
Country Liberal hold		Swing	−0.5	

2021 Daly by-election
Party	Candidate	Votes	%	±%
Labor	Dheran Young	1,629	45.2	+11.1
Country Liberal	Kris Civitarese	1,227	34.0	−1.7
Independent	Rebecca Jennings	545	15.1	+15.1
Independent	Wayne Connop	203	5.6	+5.6
Total formal votes		3,604	95.3	+1.5
Informal votes		177	4.7	−1.5
Turnout		3,781	66.3	−7.2
Two-party-preferred result
Labor	Dheran Young	2,022	56.1	+7.3
Country Liberal	Kris Civitarese	1,582	43.9	−7.3
Labor gain from Country Liberal		Swing	+7.3	

2024 Northern Territory general election: Daly
Party	Candidate	Votes	%	±%
Labor	Dheran Young	2,323	52.3	+18.4
Country Liberal	Kris Civitarese	2,119	47.7	+11.7
Total formal votes		4,442	97.1	
Informal votes		131	2.9	
Turnout		4,573	73.4	
Labor hold		Swing	+3.8	
