= Electoral results for the division of Namatjira =

This is a list of electoral results for the Electoral division of Namatjira in Northern Territory elections.

Member	Party	Term
Alison Anderson	Country Liberal	2012–2014
Alison Anderson	Independent	2014
Alison Anderson	Palmer United	2014
Alison Anderson	Independent	2014–2016
Chansey Paech	Labor	2016–2020
Bill Yan	Country Liberal	2020–present

== Election results ==
=== Elections in the 2010s ===
2012 Northern Territory general election: Namatjira
Party	Candidate	Votes	%	±%
Country Liberal	Alison Anderson	1,847	63.2	N/A
Labor	Des Rogers	824	28.2	N/A
First Nations	Warren H Williams	253	8.7	N/A
Total formal votes		2,924	95.3	N/A
Informal votes		143	4.7	N/A
Turnout		3,067	59.8	N/A
Two-party-preferred result
Country Liberal	Alison Anderson	2,006	68.6	N/A
Labor	Des Rogers	918	31.4	N/A
Country Liberal win		(new seat)		

2016 Northern Territory general election: Namatjira
Party	Candidate	Votes	%	±%
Labor	Chansey Paech	1,442	46.3	+21.5
Country Liberal	Heidi Williams	1,024	32.9	−33.2
Greens	Vincent Forrester	484	15.5	+13.8
Independent	Alan Keeling	165	5.3	+5.3
Total formal votes		3,115	98.2	+2.7
Informal votes		56	1.8	−2.7
Turnout		3,171	58.3	−4.9
Two-party-preferred result
Labor	Chansey Paech	1,742	58.5	+29.2
Country Liberal	Heidi Williams	1,236	41.5	−29.2
Labor gain from Country Liberal		Swing	+29.2	

=== Elections in the 2020s ===
2020 Northern Territory general election: Namatjira
Party	Candidate	Votes	%	±%
Country Liberal	Bill Yan	1,066	29.6	−14.0
Labor	Sheralee Taylor	977	27.1	−8.2
Territory Alliance	Matt Paterson	809	22.4	+22.4
Federation	Catherine Satour	344	9.5	+9.5
Greens	Nikki McCoy	279	7.7	−1.5
Independent	Tony Willis	131	3.6	+3.6
Total formal votes		3,606	95.2	N/A
Informal votes		180	4.8	N/A
Turnout		3,786	66.1	N/A
Two-party-preferred result
Country Liberal	Bill Yan	1,814	50.3	−1.7
Labor	Sheralee Taylor	1,792	49.7	+1.7
Country Liberal notional hold		Swing	−1.7	

2024 Northern Territory general election: Namatjira
Party	Candidate	Votes	%	±%
Country Liberal	Bill Yan	1,896	55.1	+25.5
Labor	Sheralee Taylor	874	25.4	−1.7
Greens	Blair McFarland	671	19.5	+11.8
Total formal votes		3,441	95.7	+0.5
Informal votes		154	4.3	−0.5
Turnout		3,595	55.2	
Two-party-preferred result
Country Liberal	Bill Yan	2,115	61.5	+11.2
Labor	Sheralee Taylor	1,326	38.5	−11.2
Country Liberal hold		Swing	+11.8	
