= 2021 Daly by-election =

Northern Territory by-election

← 2020	11 September 2021	2024 →

The division of Daly in the Northern Territory Legislative Assembly
- Registered: 5,706
- Turnout: 3,781 (66.3%)

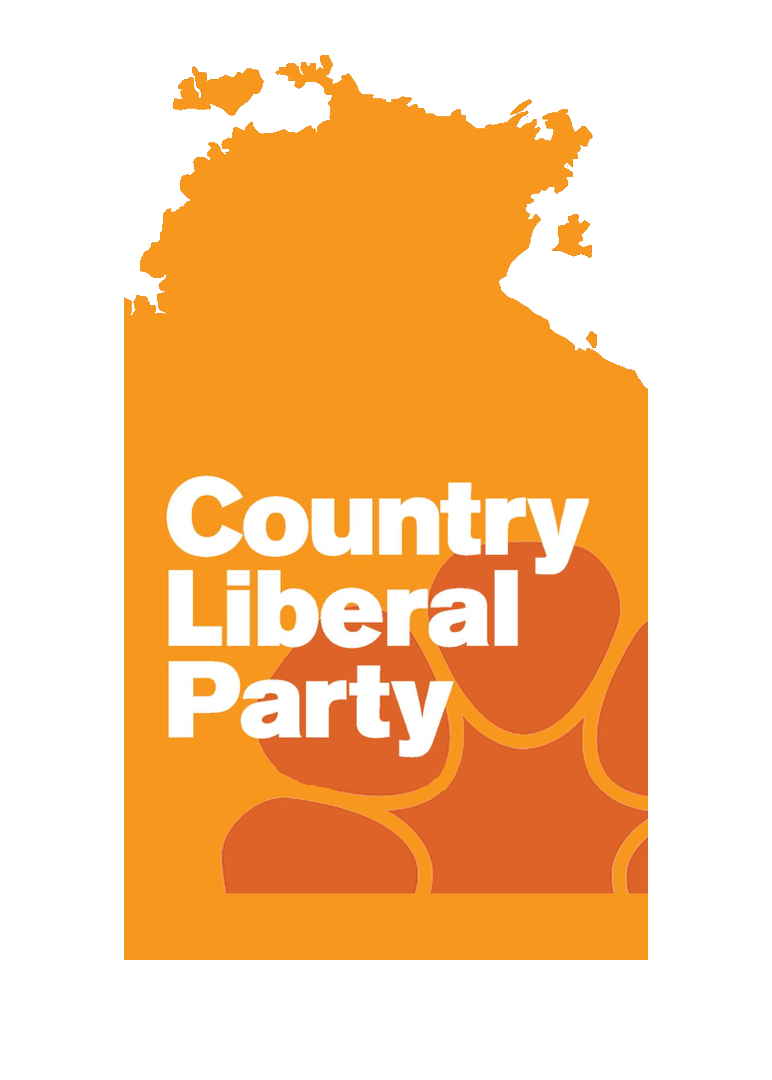
	First party	Second party	Third party
			IND
Candidate	Dheran Young	Kris Civitarese	Rebecca Jennings
Party	Labor	Country Liberal	Independent
Popular vote	1,629	1,227	545
Percentage	45.2	34.0	15.1
Swing	▲11.1	▼1.7	▲15.1
2PP	56.1%	43.9%
2PP swing	▲7.3	▼7.3
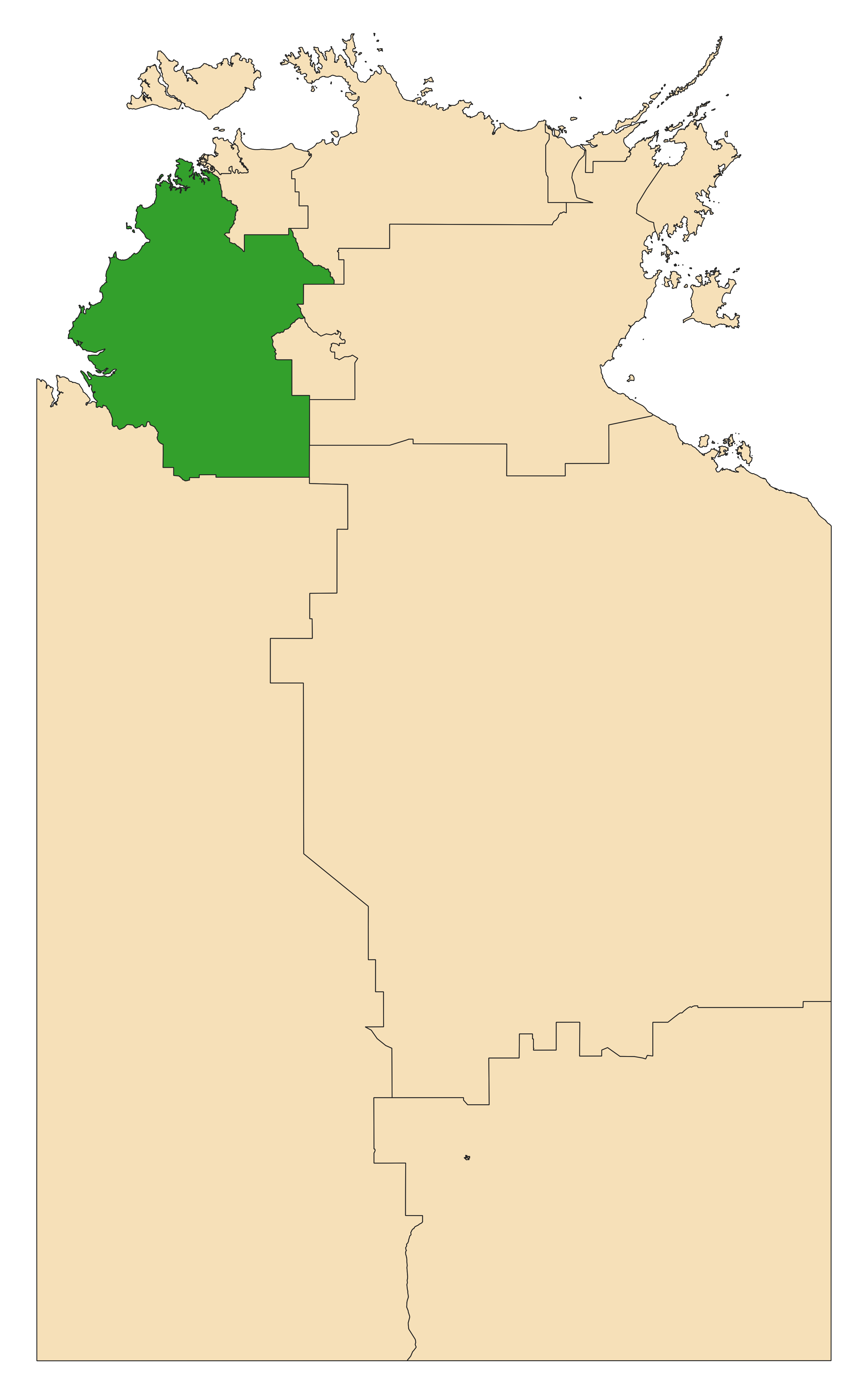
- Map of the electoral division of Daly in the Northern Territory
MLA before election
Ian Sloan
Country Liberal
Elected MLA
Dheran Young
Labor

A by-election in the seat of Daly in the Northern Territory was held on 11 September 2021, following the resignation of Ian Sloan, the MLA for Daly, on 19 August 2021. Labor candidate Dheran Young won the by-election, taking the seat from the Country Liberal Party. It is the first time in Northern Territory electoral history that an incumbent government has won a seat from the opposition in a by-election.

== Candidates ==
Candidates in ballot paper order
Party	Candidate	Background
Independent	Wayne Connop	Former solicitor, former political candidate for Labor and CLP.
Labor	Dheran Young	Former adviser to Attorney-General Selena Uibo.
Independent	Rebecca Jennings	Territory Alliance candidate for Fannie Bay in 2020.
Country Liberal	Kris Civitarese	Alderman on Barkly Regional Council.

== Results ==
2021 Daly by-election
Party	Candidate	Votes	%	±%
Labor	Dheran Young	1,629	45.2	+11.1
Country Liberal	Kris Civitarese	1,227	34.0	−1.7
Independent	Rebecca Jennings	545	15.1	+15.1
Independent	Wayne Connop	203	5.6	+5.6
Total formal votes		3,604	95.3	+1.5
Informal votes		177	4.7	−1.5
Turnout		3,781	66.3	−7.2
Two-party-preferred result
Labor	Dheran Young	2,022	56.1	+7.3
Country Liberal	Kris Civitarese	1,582	43.9	−7.3
Labor gain from Country Liberal		Swing	+7.3	

== See also ==
- List of Northern Territory by-elections
- Electoral results for the division of Daly
