= Finocchiaro ministry =

Northern Territory government since 2024

- 14th Cabinet of the Northern Territory
- Incumbent
- Date formed: 28 August 2024

People and organisations
- Monarch: Charles III
- Governor: Hugh Heggie
- Chief Minister: Lia Finocchiaro
- Deputy Chief Minister: Gerard Maley
- Total no. of members: 9
- Member party: Country Liberal Party
- Status in legislature: Majority government 17 / 25
- Opposition party: Labor
- Opposition leader: Selena Uibo

History
- Legislature term: 14th
- Predecessor: Lawler

The Finocchiaro ministry is the ministry of the 14th Chief Minister of the Northern Territory, Lia Finocchiaro. It came into operation on 28 August 2024 and succeeded the Lawler ministry. The Finocchiaro ministry is the executive of the Chief ministership of Lia Finocchiaro.

== First (interim) arrangement ==
Although the landslide victory of Finocchiaro's Country Liberal Party was beyond doubt, counting in several seats was still underway. For this reason, Finocchiaro had herself and CLP deputy leader Gerard Maley sworn in as an interim two-person government on 28 August 2024 until the full ministry could be named.

Minister	Office
Hon Lia Finocchiaro, MLA	Chief Minister; Treasurer; Minister for Police; Minister for Territory Development; Minister for Defence Industries; Minister for Industry and Trade; Minister for Arts, Culture and Heritage; Minister for Major Events; Minister for Tourism and Hospitality; Minister for Mining; Minister for Agribusiness and Fisheries; Minister for Public Employment; Minister for Health; Minister for Mental Health and Suicide Prevention; Minister for Prevention of Domestic, Family and Sexual Violence; Minister for Territory Families; Minister for Urban Housing; Minister for Youth, Seniors and Equality; Minister for Multicultural Affairs; Minister for Disabilities
Hon Gerard Maley, MLA	Deputy Chief Minister; Attorney-General and Minister for Justice; Minister for Aboriginal Affairs and Treaty; Minister for Local Government; Minister for Local Decision Making; Minister for Remote Housing and Homelands; Minister for Major Projects; Minister for Parks and Rangers; Minister for Corporate and Digital Development; Minister for Environment, Climate Change and Water Security; Minister for Sport; Minister for Renewables and Energy; Minister for Essential Services; Minister for Alcohol Policy; Minister for Fire and Emergency Services; Minister for Veterans' Affairs; Minister for Infrastructure, Planning and Logistics; Minister for Business and Jobs; Minister for Skills, Training and International Education; Minister for Recreational Fishing; Minister for Education

== First (full) arrangement ==
On 9 September 2024, Finocchiaro announced her ministry.

Minister	Office
Hon Lia Finocchiaro, MLA	Chief Minister; Minister for Police; Minister for Fire and Emergency Services; Minister for Defence NT; Minister for Territory Coordinator
Hon Gerard Maley, MLA	Deputy Chief Minister; Minister for Agribusiness and Fisheries; Minister for Mining and Energy; Minister for Corrections; Minister for Renewables; Minister for Recreational Fishing
Bill Yan	Treasurer; Minister of Logistics and Infrastructure; Minister of Housing Construction
Marie-Clare Boothby	Attorney-General; Minister for Tourism and Hospitality; Minister for Major Events; Minister for Parks and Wildlife; Minister for Racing
Steve Edgington	Minister for Health; Minister for Mental Health; Minister for Alcohol Policy; Minister for Aboriginal Affairs; Minister for Housing, Local Government and Community Development; Minister for Essential Services
Joshua Burgoyne	Minister for Lands, Planning and Environment; Minister for Corporate and Digital Development; Minister for Water Resources
Jo Hersey	Minister for Education and Training; Minister for Early Education; Minister for Service
Robyn Cahill	Minister for Trade, Business and Asian Relations; Minister for International Education, Migration, and Population; Minister for Workforce Development; Minister for Advanced Manufacturing; Minister for Children and Families; Minister for Child Protection; Minister for Prevention of Domestic Violence
Jinson Charls	Minister for People, Sport and Culture; Minister for Arts; Minister for Disability; Minister for Multicultural Affairs; Minister for Veterans
