= Ian Sloan =

Ian Sloan may refer to:

- Ian Sloan (field hockey) (born 1993), British hockey player
- Ian Sloan (mathematician) (born 1938), Australian applied mathematician
- Ian Sloan (politician) (born 1973), Australian politician
