= Chief ministership of Lia Finocchiaro =

Current government of the Australian Northern Territory

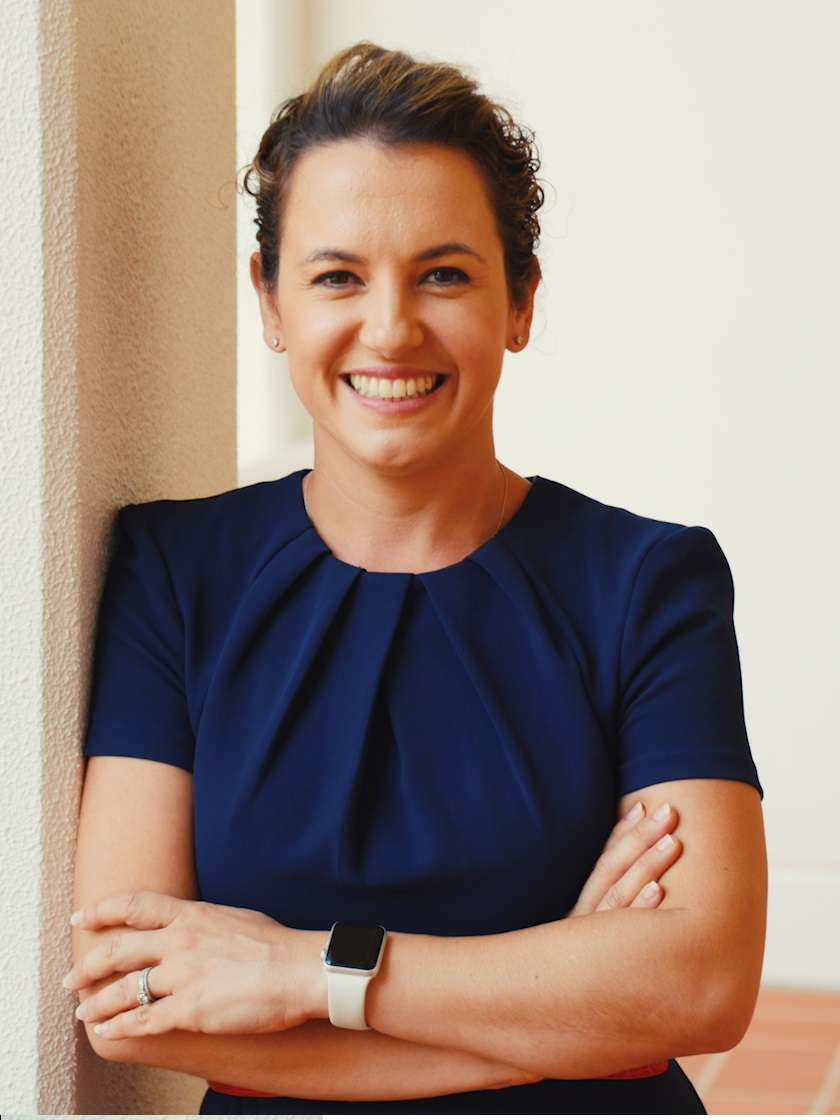
- Finocchiaro in 2020.
- Chief ministership of Lia Finocchiaro; 28 August 2024 – present (2 years, 82 days)
- Premier: Lia Finocchiaro (Note: The official title of the head of government in the Northern Territory, unlike most other Australian jurisdictions, is Chief Minister rather than Premier.)
- Governor: Hugh Heggie (Note: Unlike other jurisdictions in Australia, the head of state of the Northern Territory is given the title of Administrator, rather than Governor.)
- Cabinet: Finocchiaro I Finocchiaro II
- Party: Country Liberal; Supermajority in legislature
- Election: 2024
- Appointed by: Administrator Hugh Heggie
- Seat: Darwin, Northern Territory
- Coat of Arms of the Northern Territory

The chief ministership of Lia Finocchiaro began on 28 August 2024 when she was sworn-in by Administrator Hugh Heggie as the Chief Minister of the Northern Territory alongside Gerard Maley as Deputy Chief Minister. Finocchiaro's Country Liberal Party (CLP) won a landslide victory at the 2024 Northern Territory general election, being elected in 17 of the 25 seats in the Northern Territory Parliament. The main opposition party, Territory Labor was reduced to 4 seats, while Labor leader and former Chief Minister Eva Lawler lost her seat. The margin of the CLP's victory was not reflected in polling prior to the election, which pundits had predicted would be a close race.

A full 9 member cabinet was announced on 9 September 2024.

During her election campaign, Finocchiaro pledged to increase penalties for youth criminals, as well as lowering the age of criminal responsibility from the age of 12 to 10. This policy was heavily criticised by Amnesty International who warned it could breach human rights treaties and obligations. Despite this, Finocchiaro's government introduced the legislation early in her term, in addition to further measures restricting bail for violent offenders. Known as "Declan's Law", these reforms were a response to the murder 20 year old Declan Laverty, stabbed by a customer who was on bail for a violent assault while working in a Darwin bottle shop in March 2023.

The Finocchiaro government also quickly introduced a scheme of incentives and grants to address housing affordability in September 2024, a key election commitment intended to address interstate migration. The government has drawn criticism from Indigenous and conservation groups over the establishment of a new office of the Territory Coordinator. The powers of this appointment include exempting mining projects from environmental and other approval processes. The government argued this reform was necessary to attract investment to the Territory and deliver on its commitments to rebuild the economy. The legislation was passed in March 2025.

Along with Coalition counterparts in other Australian states, Finocchiaro voiced bipartisan support of the Federal government's adolescent social media ban. In August 2025, her government legalised pepper spray for self defence.

== Electoral history ==
=== 2024 Northern Territory general election ===
The 2024 Northern Territory general election was held on 24 August, 2024. A limited number of polls were conducted prior to the election, which showed that the Country Liberals were leading Labor. Despite the polls favouring the CLP, political pundits and psephologists in the lead-up to the election showed angst in predicting a CLP win or landslide, instead arguing that the race was most likely a toss-up and either side had a fair chance of victory. It was shown during the counting on election night that the CLP had outperformed the polls by approximately 3.5%. This was the first time that the CLP had won government in the Northern Territory since Labor reduced the Country Liberals to 2 seats in the 2016 Northern Territory general election, with Finocchiaro being only one of two remaining members of the CLP in Parliament and holding on to official opposition status despite the Territory Alliance holding more seats at the time than the CLP.

2024 NT general election by electorate

It was later revealed that the CLP had unseated Eva Lawler, the immediate predecessor of Finocchiaro in the chief minister office. The CLP upon winning was only one of two Coalition affiliate governments in Australia; the only other being Tasmania since the Liberal Nationals lost the 2023 New South Wales state election. Since the win of the Liberal National Party in the 2024 Queensland state election, Finocchiaro serves as one of three Coalition heads of government in the National Cabinet.

Since the beginning of Finocchiaro's chief ministership, her party has held a supermajority in the Northern Territory Parliament of 68% of the total seats.

==== Campaign ====
During the 2024 election campaign, the CLP released their policy platform named 'The CLP Plan to rebuild the Territory'.

The first of three priorities laid out in the plan is crime (particularly youth crime). The plan proposed among other items building two adult prisoner work camps, as well as two new women's prisons in Alice Springs and Darwin, Northern Territory. The CLP also committed to building two youth boot camps in Alice Springs and Darwin, as well as investing in skills training for inmates during prison sentences. The CLP also controversially committed to reversing a previous Labor government's decision to raise the age of criminal responsibility from 10 to 12 years of age. Amnesty International released a scorecard during the campaign mainly based on criminal minor's rights, favouring the NT Greens.

During the campaign, the CLP announced their second set of campaign pledges, aiming to 'rebuild the economy' and make the NT a competitive place to live and work. One of these pledges was to slash payroll tax for small businesses, as well as increasing the first home buyers program. Finocchiaro also announced that her government would increase tariff payments to residents who export solar energy to the grid. Finocchiaro also committed to 'vigorously pursue' the mining, gas and defence sectors in an effort to increase the strength of the NT economy.

The CLP also released during the campaign their plan to 'Restore our Lifestyle'. This was underpinned by aiding the health system by attracting more health workers, as well as lowering the cost of vaccines and medicines. Finocchiaro also committed to easing regulation for commercial and recreational fishery by removing registrations for fishing and boat licenses, as well as committing to upgrading boat ramps. Finocchiaro committed to removing entry fees for state-run national parks.

== Territorial and domestic affairs ==
=== Mining ===
Early in her term, Finocchiaro has fast-tracked plans to cut red-tape for mining companies wanting to conduct operations within the Northern Territory by delegating various extra powers to the Territory Coordinator and Minister for Mining.

=== Housing ===
Following the introduction of Finocchiaro's housing guarantee scheme, she reported mass levels of interest in buying homes within the Northern Territory.

=== National adolescent social media ban ===
In November 2024, Finocchiaro joined fellow Coalition heads of government in Australia to support the Federal Labor government's bill to ban social media access for adolescents under 16 years of age.

=== Education ===
In November 2024, Finocchiaro's government reinstated a School Attendance Officer Program with the aim of increasing school attendance for regularly truant students. The program works by having school attendance officers patrolling areas where absent students are often located outside of school during school hours, such as shopping malls. If a school attendance officer determines that a student stays at home too excessively during school hours, or they remain at areas other than school, as an authorised officer under the law, the attendance officer can issue fines to parents and arrest the violating students.

=== Treaty ===
In 2025, the CLP Northern Territory Government ended treaty plans of the former Labor government.

=== Law enforcement ===
==== Operation Ludlow ====
In November 2024, due to increasing crime in the Northern Territory and the violent wave of crime that comes in the summer, the Northern Territory Government's Police Force commenced Operation Ludlow, in attempt to reduce crime rates and better prepare for violence in the coming months. In an effort to reduce illicit consumption of alcohol during the operation, the police task force had emptied over 1000 standard alcoholic drinks a month after the operation begun, with over 100 arrests of repeat offenders made in the same time period.

==== Family violence ====
Alice Springs, one of the largest rural towns in the Northern Territory is a family violence hotspot in Australia. In December 2024, Finocchiaro hinted that federal intervention may be required after a baby was harshly injured in a violent home attack in Alice Springs, with the child subsequently being evacuated to Adelaide, South Australia for treatment. Like the previous 2024 Alice Springs curfews due to street violence, the Commissioner of the Police Force stated that additional police units would be deployed in Alice Springs, with the Australian summer being a violent period in the Northern Territory. The Police Commissioner did not rule out requesting police assistance from other Australian states.

==== Self-defence ====
In August 2025, Finocchiaro's government legalised the use of pepper spray for self defence.

== Appointments ==
=== Administrator and Supreme Court Justices ===
Hugh Heggie's term as Administrator of the Northern Territory expired in Janauay 2026. By convention, Finocchiaro as Chief Minister was required to nominate the next Administrator to be appointed by the Governor-General.

On 22 December 2025, Finocchiaro announced David Connolly as her nominee for the position. In her press release, she said "He is a true cattleman, a sharp mind, and a respected leader whose life's work has been shaped by the land and the people who depend on it ... David will represent the Territory with integrity, clarity and a keen sense of purpose." The appointment attracted some criticism on account of posts he made on the social media platform X (previously Twitter), which have since been deleted. Some posts were dismissive or contemptuous of the Commonwealth government and Prime Minister Anthony Albanese; others were deemed insulting to Aboriginal Australians and women. Connolly was sworn in on 27 February 2026 at Parliament House in Canberra by the Governor-General, Sam Mostyn,

The Attorney-General and Chief Minister confer for the appointment of Supreme Court of the Northern Territory justices, with a mandatory retirement age for justices of 72.

=== Public service ===
As the chief executive of the Northern Territory Government, Finocchiaro has the ability to appoint public service heads, as well as reorganise executive branch departments.

Upon her swearing-in as chief minister, Finocchiaro dismissed Marco Briceno and Karen Weston from their roles as the heads of health and education departments respectively. Finocchiaro also increased the number of government departments from 12 to 18, moved the youth justice portfolio from the Department of Corrections to the Department of Territory Families, as well as removed the departments responsible for climate change and Indigenous treaty.

== Legislative agenda ==
=== Crime ===
Early in her term, Finocchiaro used her large majority in the NT Parliament to introduce and pass various bills relating to the CLP crime agenda; including 'Declan's law'. Declan's law, named after a victim of youth crime — Declan Laverty, established a doctrine that courts assume that bail not be granted to both youth and adult violent offenders, irrespective of whether or not a weapon was involved in the crime.

The Finocchiaro government in the parliament introduced a bill promised during the election campaign to lower the criminal age of responsibility from 12 to 10 years of age. The bill passed the parliament In October 2024.

Despite criticism from human rights groups such as Amnesty International, it was found in November 2025 that as a result of the crime policies, crime had decreased across the Northern Territory, particularly in Alice Springs.

== See also ==
- Country Liberal Party
- 2024 Northern Territory general election
- Finocchiaro ministry
- Premiership of David Crisafulli
- Premiership of Jeremy Rockliff
