= Ah Kit =

Ah Kit is an Australian surname. Notable people with the surname include:

- Jack Ah Kit (1950 – 2020), Australian politician
- Ngaree Ah Kit (born 1981), Australian politician
