= Max Ortmann =

Australian politician

Northern Territory Legislative Assembly
Years	Term	Electoral division	Party
1990–1994	6th	Brennan	Country Liberal
1994	Changed allegiance to:		Independent

Maxwell Henry Ortmann (born 3 June 1941) is a former Australian politician. He was the Country Liberal Party member for Brennan in the Northern Territory Legislative Assembly from 1990 to 1994. Ortmann defeated sitting CLP MLA Col Firmin both for preselection and when Firmin ran as an independent. He earned the sobriquet "Mad Max" following an incident where he wrapped a microphone cord around the neck of Jeremy Thompson, an ABC reporter, after a series of probing questions. Ortmann lost preselection to Denis Burke in 1994 and was defeated as an independent.

Northern Territory Legislative Assembly
Preceded by New seat	Member for Brennan; 1990–1994	Succeeded by Denis Burke
