= 2024 Northern Territory general election =

- 24 August 2024

All 25 seats in the Northern Territory Legislative Assembly 13 seats needed for a majority
- Opinion polls
- Turnout: 68.5% (▼6.5 pp)
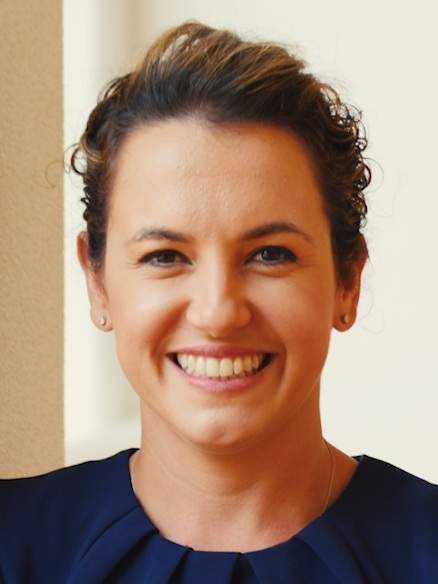

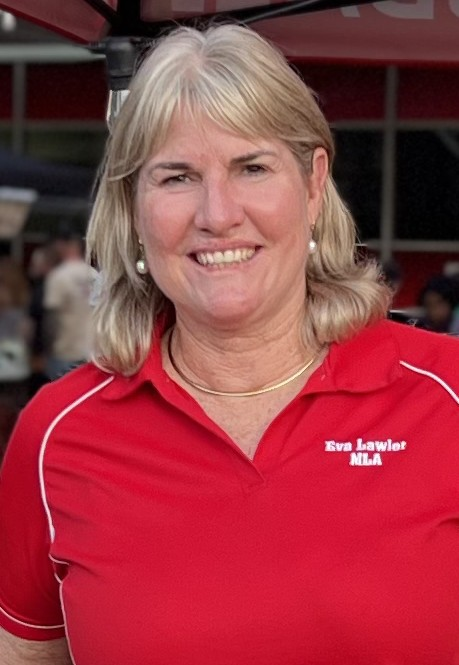

	First party	Second party	Third party
Leader	Lia Finocchiaro	Eva Lawler	No leader
Party	Country Liberal	Labor	Greens
Leader since	1 February 2020	21 December 2023	N/A
Leader's seat	Spillett	Drysdale (lost seat)	N/A
Last election	8 seats, 31.34%	14 seats, 39.43%	0 seats, 4.46%
Seats before	7 (Note: The Country Liberal Party lost the electorate of Daly to Labor at a by-election in 2021.)	14 (Note: On 18 February 2021, Mark Turner, the member for Blain, was expelled from the Labor Party caucus but remained a rank-and-file member of the party, although he sits on the crossbench, bringing Labor's seat total to thirteen. However, Labor won the seat of Daly from the Country Liberal Party at the 2021 Daly by-election on 11 September 2021, bringing their seat total back to fourteen. Turner was later expelled from the party completely.)	0
Seats won	17	4	1
Seat change	▲9	▼10	▲1
Popular vote	49,738	29,292	8,272
Percentage	48.9%	28.8%	8.13%
Swing	▲17.6	▼10.6	▲3.67
TPP	57.4%	42.6%
TPP swing	▲10.4	▼10.4
Chief Minister before election
Eva Lawler
Labor
Elected Chief Minister
Lia Finocchiaro
Country Liberal

The 2024 Northern Territory general election was held on 24 August 2024 to elect all 25 members of the Legislative Assembly in the unicameral Northern Territory Parliament. Members were elected through full preferential instant-runoff voting in single-member electorates. The election was conducted by the Northern Territory Electoral Commission (NTEC).

The incumbent centre-left Labor majority government, led by Chief Minister Eva Lawler since December 2023, sought to win a third consecutive four-year term of government. They were defeated by the centre-right Country Liberal Party (CLP) opposition, led by Opposition Leader Lia Finocchiaro, in a landslide.

The election saw the second-worst defeat of a sitting government in the Territory's history. From 14 seats at dissolution, Labor fell to four seats, its smallest presence in the Legislative Assembly since it entered the chamber in 1977; it won no seats at the first ever Northern Territory election in 1974. Labor also tallied its lowest primary vote in the Territory and suffered a complete wipeout in the urban areas of Darwin and Palmerston. The CLP swelled to 17 seats, up from seven at dissolution, giving the party a four-seat majority. There was a large swing to the CLP across Darwin, Palmerston and Alice Springs, as well as in the surrounding rural areas and in Katherine. The CLP swept the city of Palmerston and won all but two seats in Darwin and all but one seat in Alice Springs. The swing led to Eva Lawler losing her seat of Drysdale to CLP candidate Clinton Howe. She became the third Chief Minister and the first Labor Chief Minister to lose her seat at an election.

Of the four remaining seats, three were won by independents and one by left-wing minor party the Greens, whose candidate Kat McNamara defeated former Chief Minister Natasha Fyles in the seat of Nightcliff. This marked the first time the Greens entered the Legislative Assembly in the history of the Northern Territory.

For the first time in Northern Territory history, both major parties at the election were led by female leaders. Additionally, both leaders were from the city of Palmerston; indeed, before her move to the then-new seat of Spillett in 2016, Finocchiaro was the member for Drysdale (the seat Lawler won in 2016 after Finocchiaro transferred to Spillett). Voter turnout dropped in remote Aboriginal communities, which the NTEC attributed to voter fatigue and apathy; others suggested the rejection of the Indigenous Voice to Parliament at the 2023 referendum contributed to low turnout among Indigenous voters.

With the Northern Territory election results, Labor lost its first mainland state or territory since the 2018 South Australian election.

== Background ==
This was the first election for the Northern Territory Legislative Assembly where both major political parties were led by women, and the third in any Australian state or territory, after the 1995 ACT election and 2020 Queensland election.

Additionally, both leaders were from the city of Palmerston. Before her move to the then-new seat of Spillett in 2016, Finocchiaro was the member for Drysdale, the seat Lawler won in that election.

=== Previous election ===
At the 2020 election, the Labor government led by Chief Minister Michael Gunner was re-elected with a reduced majority, winning 14 of the 25 seats in the parliament. The Country Liberals (CLP) won 8 seats, whilst the Territory Alliance party won 1 seat and a further 2 seats were won by independents.

=== Parliamentary composition ===
Robyn Lambley, the Territory Alliance's sole representative in the parliament, left the party in October 2020 to sit as an independent. Labor MLA Mark Turner was expelled from the party-room caucus in February 2021 due to what he acknowledged as an "inappropriate relationship" with a Labor Party staffer, though he remained a Labor-designated member in the assembly.

A by-election was held for the seat of Daly on 11 September 2021, caused by the resignation of CLP member Ian Sloan due to health and personal issues. Labor candidate Dheran Young won the seat, the first time that an incumbent government has won a seat from the opposition in the history of the Legislative Assembly.

On 10 May 2022, Chief Minister and Labor leader Michael Gunner announced his immediate resignation from both positions, citing his desire to spend more time with his family following the birth of his and his wife's second son on 29 April. Following a party-room meeting on 13 May, Labor minister Natasha Fyles was elected unopposed to the leadership, and was sworn in as the new Chief Minister later that day. Gunner resigned from the seat of Fannie Bay on 27 July and a by-election was held on 20 August 2022. Labor retained the seat at the by-election, with Labor candidate Brent Potter retaining the seat despite a 7 per cent swing against the party.

On 17 December 2022, Labor MP for Arafura Lawrence Costa died. This triggered a by-election which was held on 18 March 2023. Manuel Brown retained the seat for Labor with a 15.6% swing towards the party on the two-party-preferred result.

In December 2023, it was revealed that Fyles holds 754 undeclared shares in South32, a company that owns a manganese mine on Groote Eylandt. Fyles faced further conflict of interest allegations and calls to resign, due to her decision earlier in 2023 to not investigate health impacts from the Groote Eylandt mine, with Leader of the Opposition Lia Finocchiaro calling her actions a 'profound betrayal of public trust'. Due to the controversy, Fyles resigned on 19 December 2023.

Three independents were elected at the 2020 election, the crossbench then increased to 4 when Mark Turner was expelled from the Labor Party.

== Redistribution ==
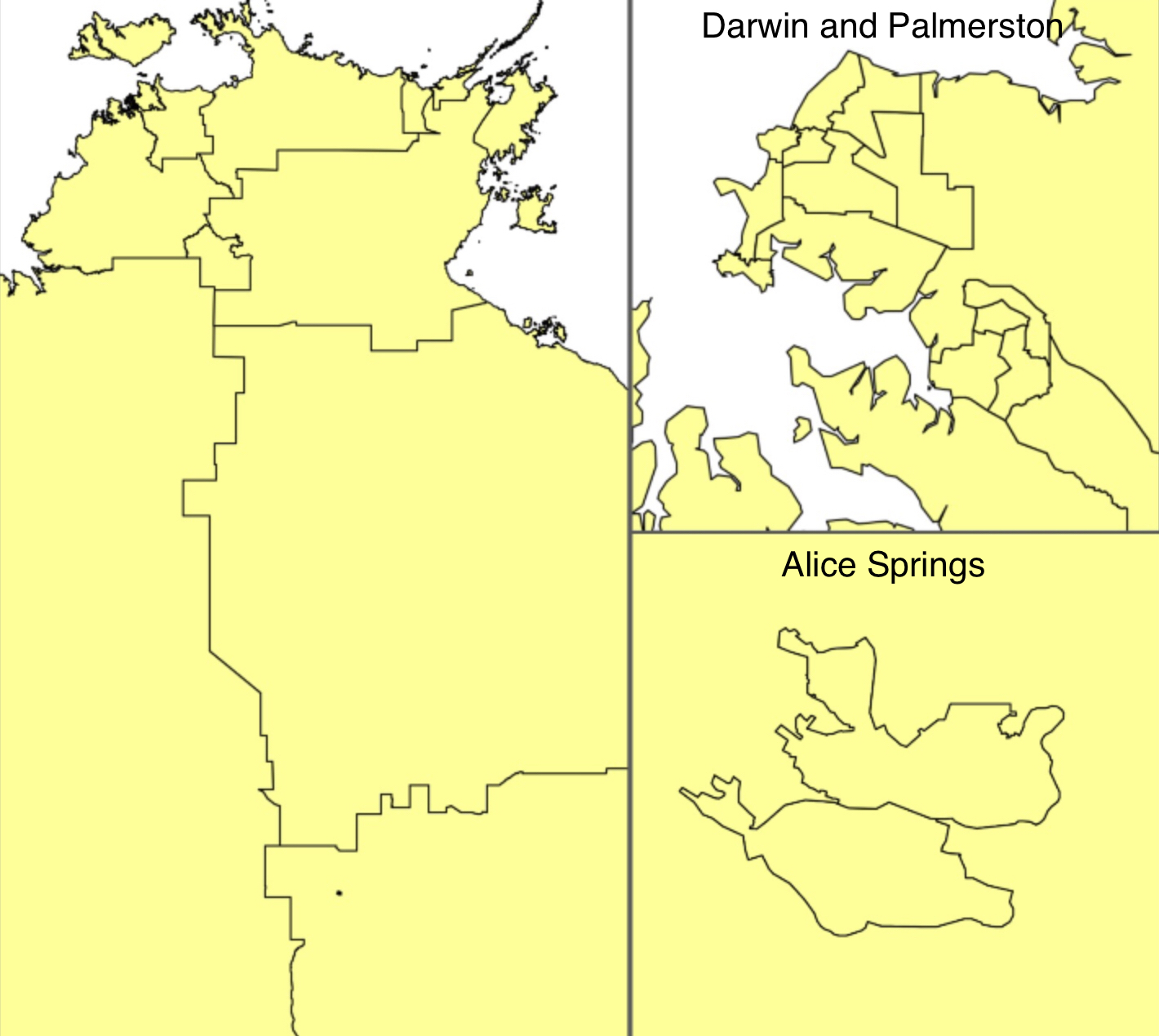
A map showing the first proposal of redistribution.

A redistribution took place in preparation for the 2024 election, largely due to the rapid population growth of Palmerston, but minor changes were also made to electorates outside the town.

The first redistribution proposal was published on 23 May 2023.

== Election date ==
The Legislative Assembly has fixed four-year terms, with elections to be held on the fourth Saturday of August every four years.

== Pendulum ==
=== Pre-election pendulum ===
Government seats (14)
Marginal
Port Darwin	Paul Kirby	ALP	1.9
Fong Lim	Mark Monaghan	ALP	2.2
Arafura	Manuel Brown (Note: Manuel Brown was elected at the 2023 Arafura by-election after the death of Lawrence Costa)	ALP	3.6 (Note: 3.6% was the Labor margin at the 2020 general election. The Labor margin after the 2023 Arafura by-election was 19.1%.)
Drysdale	Eva Lawler	ALP	5.4
Fairly safe
Daly	Dheran Young (Note: Dheran Young was elected at the 2021 Daly by-election after the resignation of Ian Sloan)	ALP	6.1 (Note: The margin after the 2021 Daly by-election was 7.3% for Labor. The by-election margin adjusted for redistribution is 6.1% for Labor. The margin at the 2020 general election was 1.2% for the Country Liberal Party)
Karama	Ngaree Ah Kit	ALP	8.3
Safe
Fannie Bay	Brent Potter (Note: Brent Potter was elected at the 2022 Fannie Bay by-election after the resignation of former Chief Minister Michael Gunner)	ALP	10.9 (Note: 10.9% was the Labor margin at the 2020 general election. The Labor margin after the 2022 Fannie Bay by-election was 2.2%.)
Arnhem	Selena Uibo	ALP	15.9 (Note: The Labor margin in Arnhem at the 2020 general election was 1.4% versus Independent Ian Mongunu Gumbula. Gumbula is running as a CLP candidate in the 2024 general election without the support of Mulka Independent MLA Yingiya Mark Guyula who supported him in 2020, which would make the 2020 two-party preferred result adjusted for redistribution a better measure of the contest.)
Casuarina	Lauren Moss	ALP	16.0
Gwoja	Chansey Paech	ALP	16.2
Johnston	Joel Bowden	ALP	16.0
Wanguri	Nicole Manison	ALP	17.3
Sanderson	Kate Worden	ALP	18.8
Nightcliff	Natasha Fyles	ALP	24.1

Opposition seats (7)
Marginal
Barkly	Steve Edgington	CLP	0.1
Namatjira	Bill Yan	CLP	0.3
Braitling	Joshua Burgoyne	CLP	1.3
Katherine	Jo Hersey	CLP	2.5
Brennan	Marie-Clare Boothby	CLP	3.0
Fairly safe
Nelson	Gerard Maley	CLP	9.2 v IND
Safe
Spillett	Lia Finocchiaro	CLP	13.5
Crossbench seats (4)
Araluen	Robyn Lambley	IND	0.5 v CLP
Blain	Mark Turner	IND (Note: Mark Turner was expelled from the Labor Party caucus in 2021 and from the party completely in 2023.)	1.3 (ALP v CLP)
Mulka	Yingiya Mark Guyula	IND	5.1 v ALP
Goyder	Kezia Purick	IND	6.8 v CLP

=== Notes ===
- This pre-election pendulum is based on post-redistribution estimates of margins calculated by ABC election analyst Antony Green.
- Members listed in italics are retiring at the 2024 election.

=== Post-election pendulum ===
Government seats (17)
Marginal
Fannie Bay	Laurie Zio	CLP	0.39 v GRN
Casuarina	Khoda Patel	CLP	0.70
Blain	Matthew Kerle	CLP	1.92 v IND
Barkly	Steve Edgington	CLP	1.93
Sanderson	Jinson Charls	CLP	2.20
Braitling	Joshua Burgoyne	CLP	3.85 v GRN
Fairly safe
Fong Lim	Tanzil Rahman	CLP	7.46
Wanguri	Oly Carlson	CLP	8.99
Safe
Karama	Brian O'Gallagher	CLP	11.33
Namatjira	Bill Yan	CLP	11.46
Port Darwin	Robyn Cahill	CLP	11.73
Katherine	Jo Hersey	CLP	12.16 v IND
Goyder	Andrew Mackay	CLP	12.66 v IND
Drysdale	Clinton Howe	CLP	14.96
Brennan	Marie-Clare Boothby	CLP	23.90
Nelson	Gerard Maley	CLP	25.0 v IND (Note: Margin is an ABC estimate)
Spillett	Lia Finocchiaro	CLP	29.58

Opposition seats (4)
Marginal
Daly	Dheran Young	ALP	2.29
Safe
Arnhem	Selena Uibo	ALP	14.26
Gwoja	Chansey Paech	ALP	15.84
Arafura	Manuel Brown	ALP	19.68
Crossbench seats (4)
Nightcliff	Kat McNamara	GRN	0.40 v ALP
Johnston	Justine Davis	IND	7.64 v CLP
Araluen	Robyn Lambley	IND	14.73 v CLP
Mulka	Yingiya Mark Guyula	IND	25.20 v CLP

== Registered parties ==
At the close of nominations for the election, five parties were registered with the Northern Territory Electoral Commission (NTEC).

- Animal Justice Party
- Australian Labor Party
- Country Liberal Party
- Federation Party
- Greens

== Candidates and retiring MLAs ==
=== Retiring MLAs ===
The following members announced that they were not contesting the 2024 election:

==== Labor ====
- Paul Kirby (Port Darwin) – announced retirement on 25 January 2024
- Nicole Manison (Wanguri) – announced retirement 12 January 2024

==== Independent ====
- Kezia Purick (Goyder) – announced retirement 15 February 2024

=== Candidates ===
Finocchiaro announced the first CLP candidates in May 2023.

Labor confirmed they would not contest the seat of Mulka on 1 August 2024, with Chief Minister Eva Lawler citing her party's "good relationship with and respect for" incumbent MLA Yingiya Mark Guyula.

Nominations closed on 8 August 2024 and the ballot draws were conducted the same day. In total, 80 candidates nominated for election, down from 111 at the previous election.

This is the first election since the 2008 election where the only parties to field candidates were ALP, CLP, and the Greens.

Sitting members are listed in bold. Successful candidates are highlighted in the relevant colour. Where there is possible confusion, an asterisk is used.

Seat	Held by	ALP candidate	CLP candidate	Greens candidate	Independent candidates
Arafura	ALP	**Manuel Brown**	Yanja Thompson		
Araluen	Independent	Gagandeep Sodhi	Sean Heenan	Hugo Wells	**Robyn Lambley***; Wayne Wright
Arnhem	ALP	**Selena Uibo**	Ian Mongunu Gumbula		
Barkly	CLP	Lizzie Hogan	**Steve Edgington**		
Blain	Independent	Danielle Eveleigh	Matthew Kerle		**Mark Turner**
Braitling	CLP	Allison Bitar	**Joshua Burgoyne**	Asta Hill	
Brennan	CLP	Tony Sievers	**Marie-Clare Boothby**		
Casuarina	ALP	**Lauren Moss**	Khoda Patel	Pamela McCalman	Martin Jackson
Daly	ALP	**Dheran Young**	Kris Civitarese		
Drysdale	ALP	**Eva Lawler**	Clinton Howe		Cindy Mebbingarri Roberts
Fannie Bay	ALP	**Brent Potter**	Laurie Zio	Suki Dorras-Walker	Leonard May
Fong Lim	ALP	**Mark Monaghan**	Tanzil Rahman	Simon Niblock	Amye Un
Goyder	Independent	Sandy Griffin	Andrew Mackay		Belinda Kolstad; Mathew Salter; Trevor Jenkins
Gwoja	ALP	**Chansey Paech**	Jarrod Jupurula Williams		
Johnston	ALP	**Joel Bowden**	Gary Strachan	Billie Barton	Justine Davis
Karama	ALP	**Ngaree Ah Kit**	Brian O'Gallagher	Andy Rowan	Justine Glover
Katherine	CLP	Nick Lovering	**Jo Hersey**		Sam Phelan
Mulka	Independent		Allen Fanning		**Yingiya Mark Guyula**
Namatjira	CLP	Sheralee Taylor	**Bill Yan**	Blair McFarland	
Nelson	CLP	Anthony Venes	**Gerard Maley**		Beverley Ratahi
Nightcliff	ALP	**Natasha Fyles**	Helen Secretary	Kat McNamara	George Mamouzellos; Mililma May
Port Darwin	ALP	Brian Manning	Robyn Cahill	Greg Dickson	Janey Davies; Leah Potter
Sanderson	ALP	**Kate Worden**	Jinson Charls		
Spillett	CLP	Caleb Burke	**Lia Finocchiaro**		
Wanguri	ALP	Shlok Sharma	Oly Carlson	Andrew Coates	Graeme Sawyer

==== Disendorsed candidates ====
Party	Candidate	Seat	Disendorsed	Reason for disendorsement
Greens	Peltherre Chris Tomlins	Araluen	8 March 2024	Disendorsed over a Facebook post expressing an antisemitic conspiracy theory.

== Opinion polling ==
=== Voting intention ===
Date	Firm	Primary vote						TPP (Note: The TPP estimates have been manually calculated based on preference flows.)
Date	Firm	ALP	CLP	IND	GRN	SFF	OTH	ALP	CLP
2024 election		28.8%	48.9%	14.2%	8.1%	−	−	42.6%	57.4%
May 2024	Freshwater Strategy	29%	39%	22%	9%	−	−	46%	54%
16–18 November 2023	Redbridge	19.7%	40.6%	14%	13.1%	9.4%	2.4% (Note: Animal Justice Party 2.4%)	43.5%	56.5%
2020 election		39.4%	31.3%	10.7%	4.5%	N/A	14.1% (Note: Includes the now defunct, Territory Alliance, who were a 12.90% share of this figure.)	53.3%	46.7%

=== Demographic breakdown ===
Below is a demographic breakdown of the Redbridge poll conducted from 16 to 18 November 2023.

Demographic breakdown
Demographic	ALP	CLP	IND	GRN	SFF	AJP
Total results	20%	41%	13%	8%	9%	1%
Age
18–39	11%	40%	14%	16%	16%	2%
40–59	26%	39%	17%	10%	4%	3%
60+	27%	44%	11%	12%	5%	1%
Gender
Women	21%	40%	13%	15%	8%	2%
Men	18%	43%	17%	10%	8%	3%
Education
Less than Year 12	15%	30%	17%	7%	20%	11%
High school	18%	44%	8%	19%	7%	2%
Technical and further education (TAFE)	14%	50%	19%	8%	7%	2%
University or higher	24%	41%	14%	17%	3%	1%
Annual income
<$50,000	19%	26%	21%	13%	13%	8%
$50,000–$80,000	29%	37%	14%	16%	4%	0%
$80,000–$120,000	9%	53%	13%	18%	5%	2%
$120,000–$200,000	21%	51%	16%	5%	8%	0%
>$200,000	32%	50%	4%	12%	2%	0%
Indigenous status
Indigenous	16%	44%	8%	14%	10%	7%
Non-Indigenous	20%	42%	17%	13%	6%	2%
Language spoken at home
English	22%	42%	13%	15%	6%	2%
Not English	13%	40%	23%	9%	11%	4%
Language other than English
Yolŋu	0%	0%	32%	0%	68%	0%
Kriol	71%	29%	0%	0%	0%	0%
Greek	9%	46%	25%	21%	0%	0%
Nepali	0%	24%	0%	37%	0%	39%
Tagalog	33%	61%	0%	0%	0%	6%
Other	12%	42%	29%	6%	10%	0%
Federal voting intention
Labor	63%	10%	8%	14%	1%	5%
Country Liberal	6%	85%	3%	5%	0%	0%
Greens	15%	4%	5%	57%	19%	0%
One Nation	6%	25%	22%	6%	33%	8%
Independent	5%	4%	67%	7%	11%	6%
Other	5%	3%	55%	6%	30%	1%

== Campaign issues ==
The most prominent issue in the campaign was crime. Other issues included cost of living and pet crocodiles.

The Country Liberal Party (CLP) had a policy to lower the age of criminal responsibility from 12 to 10 years old, reversing the Gunner government's 2022 increase.

== Results ==
=== Results summary ===
Legislative Assembly (IRV) – (CV)
Party	Votes	%	+/–	Seats	+/–
Country Liberal	49,738	48.89	▲17.55	17	▲9
Labor	29,292	28.79	▼10.64	4	▼10
Independents	14,439	14.19	▲3.45	3	▲1
Greens	8,272	8.13	▲3.67	1	▲1
Total	101,741	100.00	–	25	–
Valid votes	101,741	96.99	+0.45		
Invalid/blank votes	3,160	3.01	−0.45		
Total votes	104,901	100.00	–		
Registered voters/turnout	153,248	68.45	−6.49		
Source: ABC News NTEC
Two-party-preferred vote
Country Liberal		57.4	▲10.4		
Labor		42.6	▼10.4		
Total					

The CLP swept Labor from power in a massive landslide, winning 58 percent of the two-party vote on a territory-wide swing of 11 percent. The swing was particularly pronounced in Darwin and Palmerston. The CLP took all of Palmerston and all but two seats in Darwin, all on swings of over 10 percent. Notably, the CLP took five out of seven seats in Darwin's northern suburbs, which had been Labor's power base in the Territory since the turn of the millennium. Labor won power for the first time in 2001 by sweeping the northern suburbs, and retained all but one seat there even when defeated in 2012. It initially appeared Natasha Fyles in Nightcliff would be the only Labor member left in the Darwin/Palmerston area, but the Greens narrowly defeated her to complete Labor's urban wipeout.

Lawler herself was defeated in Drysdale by CLP challenger Clinton Howe on a swing of over 21 percent, enough on paper to turn it into a safe CLP seat. She was the third head of government in the Territory and the fourth major-party leader to lose their own seat. All but two members of her cabinet were defeated, the only survivors being Deputy Chief Minister Chansey Paech and Selena Uibo.

=== Seats changing hands ===
Members in italics did not seek re-election.

Seat	Pre-election			Swing	Post-election		
Seat	Party	Member	Margin	Swing	Margin	Member	Party
Blain	Independent	Mark Turner (Note: Mark Turner was elected as a Labor candidate, but was sacked from the party.)	1.3	3.4	2.1 v IND	Matthew Kerle	Country Liberal
Casuarina	Labor	Lauren Moss	16.0	17.1	1.1	Khoda Patel	Country Liberal
Drysdale	Labor	Eva Lawler	5.4	20.3	14.9	Clinton Howe	Country Liberal
Fannie Bay	Labor	Brent Potter	10.9	11.3	0.8 v GRN	Laurie Zio	Country Liberal
Fong Lim	Labor	Mark Monaghan	2.2	10.3	8.1	Tanzil Rahman	Country Liberal
Goyder	Independent	Kezia Purick	6.8	19.3	12.5 v IND	Andrew Mackay	Country Liberal
Johnston	Labor	Joel Bowden	16.0	8.1	7.9 v CLP	Justine Davis	Independent
Karama	Labor	Ngaree Ah Kit	8.3	20.4	12.1	Brian O'Gallagher	Country Liberal
Nightcliff	Labor	Natasha Fyles	24.1	24.6	0.5 v ALP	Kat McNamara	Greens
Port Darwin	Labor	Paul Kirby	1.9	14.0	12.1	Robyn Cahill	Country Liberal
Sanderson	Labor	Kate Worden	18.8	21.0	2.2	Jinson Charls	Country Liberal
Wanguri	Labor	Nicole Manison	17.3	26.3	9.0	Oly Carlson	Country Liberal
