= June D'Rozario =

Australian urban planner and former politician

June D'Rozario (born 16 June 1949) is an Australian urban planner and former politician.

Northern Territory Legislative Assembly
Years	Term	Electoral division	Party
1977–1980	2nd	Sanderson	Labor
1980–1983	3rd	Sanderson	Labor

She was born in Lucknow, India and is of Anglo-Indian descent. D'Rozario studied planning at the University of South Australia, before joining the State Planning Office. After Cyclone Tracy in 1974, she moved to Darwin, Northern Territory to assist with the reconstruction effort.

In 1977, she was elected as a Labor member of the Northern Territory Legislative Assembly, unexpectedly defeating Executive Member for Law Liz Andrew in the seat of Sanderson. She held the seat until her defeat by Daryl Manzie at the 1983 election.

D'Rozario currently runs a Town & Regional Planning practice in Darwin, Northern Territory. She has been an urban planner in Darwin since 1973. She is a Fellow, and a National Councillor, of the Planning Institute of Australia (PIA). In 2001 she was awarded a Centenary Medal for services to urban planning and city development.

She is a member of the Board of Management of Uluṟu-Kata Tjuṯa National Park, a Commissioner of the Australian Heritage Commission, a member of the National Population Council, and a member of the Board of the Australia-India Council.

Northern Territory Legislative Assembly
Preceded by Liz Andrew	Member for Sanderson; 1977–1983	Succeeded by Daryl Manzie
