= Liz Andrew =

Australian politician

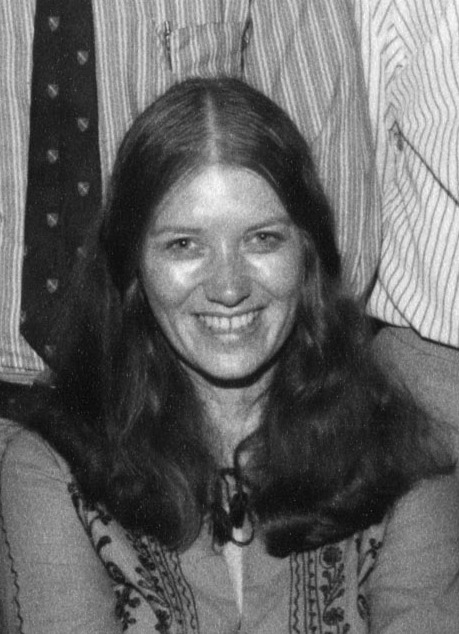
- Andrew in 1976

Member of the Northern Territory Legislative Assembly for Sanderson
- In office 19 October 1974 – 12 August 1977
- Preceded by: Division created
- Succeeded by: June D'Rozario

Personal details
- Born: 28 February 1948 Border Town, South Australia
- Died: 12 April 1993 (aged 45) Adelaide, South Australia
- Party: Country Liberal Party
- Profession: Teacher

Elizabeth Jean Andrew (later Andrew-Oates; 28 February 1948 – 12 April 1993) was an Australian politician. She was a Country Liberal Party member of the Northern Territory Legislative Assembly from 1974 to 1977, representing the suburban Darwin electorate of Sanderson. She served as Executive Member for Education and Community Services and Executive Member for Education and Law in the ministry of Dr Goff Letts.

Northern Territory Legislative Assembly
Years	Term	Electoral division	Party
1974–1977	1st	Sanderson	Country Liberal

Andrew was born in Border Town, South Australia, and was educated at Western Teachers College and the University of Adelaide. She moved to Darwin in 1973, and taught variously at Gillen, Katherine and Wagaman before her election to the Legislative Assembly in 1974 at the age of 26. She was unexpectedly defeated by Labor candidate June D'Rozario in 1977, and returned to teaching at Howard Springs and then Parap. She was appointed Administrator of the Northern Territory Arts Council in 1980 and served as general secretary of the Country Liberal Party until 1983. She left the Northern Territory for Canberra in 1986 when her navy officer husband received an interstate posting.

She was diagnosed with cancer in 1989 and died in 1993 at the age of 45.

Northern Territory Legislative Assembly
Division created	Member for Sanderson; 1974–1977	Succeeded by June D'Rozario
