= Electoral division of Sanderson =

Coordinates: 12°23′54″S 130°52′48″E

Sanderson Northern Territory—Legislative Assembly
- Interactive map of boundaries as of the 2024 election
- Territory: Northern Territory
- Created: 1974
- MP: Jinson Charls
- Party: Country Liberal
- Namesake: Frederick James Sanderson
- Electors: 5,975 (2026)
- Area: 21 km^{2} (8.1 sq mi)
- Demographic: Urban
Electorates around Sanderson:
Casuarina; Johnston	Wanguri	Wanguri
Fannie Bay	Sanderson	Karama
Fong Lim	Fong Lim	Fong Lim

Sanderson is an electoral division of the Legislative Assembly in Australia's Northern Territory. It was first created in 1974, and derives its name from the name initially given to the area in 1879, before its division into suburbs. Sanderson is an urban electorate, covering 21 km^{2} and taking in the Darwin suburbs of Anula, Marrara, Wulagi and part of Malak. There were 5,975 people enrolled in the electorate as of July 2026.

Sanderson is a bellwether seat that has only tended to change hands at times of major political change in the Territory. It was initially won by the Country Liberal Party's Liz Andrew in 1974, when the CLP won all but two seats in the Assembly (both of which went to independents). However, Andrew was defeated by the Labor Party's June D'Rozario when the ALP swept into the Assembly in 1977, taking several seats. D'Rozario held the seat until 1983, she was swept by the CLP's Daryl Manzie amid the massive CLP landslide of that year. Manzie was a popular incumbent, and held the seat relatively easily until his retirement in 2001.

Sanderson then reverted to the ALP in 2001, when Len Kiely was swept into office amid Labor's sweep of north Darwin. The seat was targeted by the CLP at the 2005 election as one they hoped to win back, but Kiely had little difficulty winning a second term amidst a massive territory-wide swing to the ALP. He was defeated in 2008 by Peter Styles, who became only the second opposition MP in the seat's history. Styles retained the seat in 2012 amid the CLP victory of that year, despite a small swing to the ALP. In the 2016 election, Styles was heavily defeated by Labor's Kate Worden amid the CLP's collapse in Darwin. Worden picked up a swing of over 13 percent, turning Sanderson into a safe Labor seat at one stroke. Worden consolidated her hold on the seat in 2020, sitting on a majority of 19.3 percent, the second-safest in the Territory. In 2024 however, she lost her seat to the CLP in an election that saw the Country Liberals win back government and Labor wiped out of Darwin.

== Members for Sanderson ==
Member	Party	Term
Liz Andrew	Country Liberal	1974–1977
June D'Rozario	Labor	1977–1983
Daryl Manzie	Country Liberal	1983–2001
Len Kiely	Labor	2001–2008
Peter Styles	Country Liberal	2008–2016
Kate Worden	Labor	2016–2024
Jinson Charls	Country Liberal	2024–present

== Election results ==
2024 Northern Territory general election: Sanderson
Party	Candidate	Votes	%	±%
Country Liberal	Jinson Charls	2,311	52.2	+29.9
Labor	Kate Worden	2,116	47.8	−11.7
Total formal votes		4,427	96.7	−0.9
Informal votes		149	3.3	+0.9
Turnout		4,576	77.8	
Country Liberal gain from Labor		Swing	+21.0	
