= Jinson Charls =

Australian politician

- Charls in 2026

Member of the Northern Territory Legislative Assembly for the Electoral division of Sanderson
- Incumbent
- Assumed office 24 August 2024
- Preceded by: Kate Worden
- Constituency: Sanderson

Personal details
- Party: Country Liberal Party

Jinson Anto Charls is an Australian politician from the Country Liberal Party. In the 2024 Northern Territory general election, he unseated Labor minister Kate Worden in Sanderson. On 9 September 2024, he was appointed to the Finocchiaro ministry as a government minister.

== Early life and early career ==
Charls was born in Kerala, India and moved to Australia in 2011, before moving to Darwin in 2015.

Charls completed a Bachelor of Science in Nursing and Midwifery before migrating to Australia in 2011. He moved to Darwin in 2015, where he worked as a registered nurse in the Alcohol Mandatory Treatment program.

Charls later completed a Master of Mental Health Nursing and a Graduate Certificate in Leadership and Management. He is also a graduate of the Australian Institute of Company Directors.

Charls held clinical, operational and senior management positions in the Northern Territory health system. His roles within Top End Mental Health, Alcohol and Other Drugs Services at NT Health included operations manager, director of acute services, director of recovery and rehabilitation services, and acting executive director.

== Ministerial responsibilities ==
Charls was appointed to the Finocchiaro ministry on 9 September 2024.

As of October 2026, Charls serves as Minister for People, Sport and Culture; Minister for Disability; Minister for Arts; Minister for Youth, Seniors and Equality; Minister for Multicultural Affairs; and Minister for Veterans.

== Personal life ==
Charls and his wife Anu, a nurse practitioner, have two daughters and live in the Northern Territory.

In May, during a debate on racism in parliament, the Northern Territories Anti-Discrimination Commissioner Jeswynn Yogaratnam criticised Charls' comments that appeared to link race with Charles Darwin's theory of evolution. Justine Davis, a member of the legislative assembly, questioned Charls' ability to fulfill the role of multicultural affairs minister after he made comments likening the opposition to the Nazi party and later quoted Joseph Goebbels. In the beginning of his speech, Charls told the chamber that he does "not support racism in any form".

Northern Territory Legislative Assembly
| Preceded by Kate Worden | Member for Sanderson; 2024–present | Incumbent |
