= Matthew Kerle =

Australian politician

Matthew Kerle MLA

Member of the Northern Territory Legislative Assembly for Blain
- Incumbent
- Assumed office 24 August 2024
- Preceded by: Mark Turner

Personal details
- Party: Country Liberal Party
- Education: Charles Darwin University

Matthew Kerle is an Australian politician from the Country Liberal Party.

Kerle is a software engineer and gymnastics coach. He attended Charles Darwin University.

In the 2020 Northern Territory general election, Kerle lost to Labor's Mark Turner in Blain. In the 2024 Northern Territory general election, he was elected to the Northern Territory Legislative Assembly in the same electoral division.

Before his career as an elected politician began, Kerle worked in software development.

Northern Territory Legislative Assembly
Preceded by Mark Turner	Member for Blain; 2024–present	Incumbent
