= Brian O'Gallagher =

Australian politician

Brian O'Gallagher MLA

Member of the Northern Territory Legislative Assembly for Karama
- Incumbent
- Assumed office 24 August 2024
- Preceded by: Ngaree Ah Kit

Personal details
- Party: Country Liberal Party

Brian O'Gallagher is an Australian politician from the Country Liberal Party.

He is a Darwin City Councillor. In the 2020 Northern Territory general election, O'Gallagher lost to Labor minister Ngaree Ah Kit in Karama. In the 2024 Northern Territory general election, he unseated Ah Kit in the same electoral division.

Northern Territory Legislative Assembly
Preceded by Ngaree Ah Kit	Member for Karama; 2024–present	Incumbent
