= Electoral division of Karama =

Coordinates: 12°24′03.85″S 130°55′00.80″E

Karama Northern Territory—Legislative Assembly
- Interactive map of boundaries as of the 2024 election
- Territory: Northern Territory
- Created: 1987
- MP: Brian O'Gallagher
- Party: Country Liberal
- Namesake: Karama
- Electors: 6,237 (2026)
- Area: 8 km^{2} (3.1 sq mi)
- Demographic: Urban
Electorates around Karama:
Sanderson	Wanguri	Wanguri
Sanderson	Karama	Nelson
Fong Lim	Sanderson	Nelson

Karama is an electoral division of the Legislative Assembly in Australia's Northern Territory. It was first created in 1987, and derives its name from the suburb of the same name. It is an urban electorate, covering 8 km^{2} and taking in the Darwin suburbs of Karama and Malak, as well as parts of Berrimah and Marrara. There were 6,237 people enrolled within the electorate as of July 2026.

== History ==
The Country Liberal Party's Mick Palmer won the seat in 1987, and as the incumbent member during the height of the CLP's dominance of Territory politics, had little trouble holding the seat through the next three elections. Until the 2000s, it was almost unheard of for a sitting member to be defeated, so few thought Palmer would face much difficulty gaining a fourth term at the 2001 election. However, the Labor Party swept through the northern suburbs of Darwin and Palmer was unexpectedly defeated by the ALP candidate, Delia Lawrie, the daughter of former long-serving independent MP Dawn Lawrie. Lawrie's victory created the first mother-daughter political dynasty in Australian politics, and she soon established herself in the electorate. She was easily re-elected at the 2005 election, significantly increasing her majority. Lawrie was disendorsed by the Labor Party in October 2015, and she resigned from the party a few days later. She nominated as an independent candidate for Karama at the 2016 election, against the preselected Labor candidate, Ngaree Ah Kit. Ah Kit defeated Lawrie at said election and she held the seat until the 2024 Northern Territory general election when she was unseated by Brian O'Gallagher from the Country Liberal Party.

== Members for Karama ==
Member	Party	Term
Mick Palmer	Country Liberal	1987–2001
Delia Lawrie	Labor	2001–2015
Delia Lawrie	Independent	2015–2016
Ngaree Ah Kit	Labor	2016–2024
Brian O'Gallagher	Country Liberal	2024–present

== Election results ==
2024 Northern Territory general election: Karama
Party	Candidate	Votes	%	±%
Country Liberal	Brian O'Gallagher	2,060	49.7	+20.7
Labor	Ngaree Ah Kit	1,096	26.4	−22.8
Independent	Justine Glover	669	16.1	+16.1
Greens	Andy Rowan	322	7.8	+7.8
Total formal votes		4,127	96.1	−0.9
Informal votes		167	3.9	+0.9
Turnout		4,314	72.1	
Two-party-preferred result
Country Liberal	Brian O'Gallagher	2,542	61.3	+19.6
Labor	Ngaree Ah Kit	1,605	38.7	−19.6
Country Liberal gain from Labor		Swing	+19.6	
