= Electoral division of Blain =

Coordinates: 12°31′16″S 130°58′49″E

Blain Northern Territory—Legislative Assembly
- Interactive map of boundaries as of the 2024 election
- Territory: Northern Territory
- Created: 1997
- MP: Matthew Kerle
- Party: Country Liberal Party
- Namesake: Adair Blain
- Electors: 6,735 (2026)
- Area: 4 km^{2} (1.5 sq mi)
- Demographic: Urban
Electorates around Blain:
| Nelson | Drysdale | Brennan |
| Darwin Harbour | Blain | Brennan |
| Darwin Harbour | Daly | Daly |

Blain is an electoral division of the Legislative Assembly in Australia's Northern Territory. It was first created in 1997 and is named after Adair Blain, the second member for the federal Northern Territory electorate, and the only Australian sitting federal MP to ever become a prisoner of war. Blain is an urban electorate, covering 4 km^{2} and taking in Palmerston suburbs of Bellamack and Woodroffe and the suburb of Moulden. There were 6,735 people enrolled within the electorate as of July 2026.

The current member for Blain is Matthew Kerle, who was elected for the CLP at the 2024 election.

== History ==
For the better part of four decades, Palmerston was reckoned as a bastion of conservatism, and all the seats in the city were usually held by the Country Liberal Party. For the first three decades of its existence, Blain was reckoned as a particularly safe CLP seat even by Palmerston standards, with successive members winning it without serious difficulty. This was further emphasised at the 2005 election, when Blain was one of only four CLP-held seats retained by the party after a landslide victory by the Labor Party, and the only CLP seat in the Darwin/Palmerston area.

Longtime CLP MP and Deputy Chief Minister Barry Coulter, who had represented Palmerston-area electorates since 1983 (Berrimah from 1983 to 1987 and Palmerston from 1987 to 1997) held this seat for the final term of his parliamentary career. He was succeeded by Terry Mills, who became a prominent member of the CLP frontbench after the CLP lost power for the first time in 2001. He eventually became CLP leader from 2003 to 2005, returning to the leadership in 2008. After narrowly losing the 2008 Territory election, he led the CLP to victory in 2012 and became Chief Minister.

Mills was deposed in a party-room coup less than a year later, and Nathan Barrett retained the seat for the CLP at the ensuing by-election despite a 10 percent swing.

Barrett was forced out of politics in 2016 after he sent a lewd video to a constituent. At the 2016 election, the CLP was pushed into third place after its primary vote plummeted to 25 percent, losing more than half of its primary vote from 2012. The seat was nearly swept up in the massive Labor wave that swept through the metropolitan area. However, Mills, contesting his old seat as an independent, narrowly defeated former federal MP Damian Hale to return to the legislature. Mills founded the Territory Alliance party in November 2019, but was defeated at the 2020 election, with Mark Turner winning the seat for Labor.

== Members for Blain ==
| Member | Party | Term |
|---|---|---|
| Barry Coulter | Country Liberal | 1997–1999 |
| Terry Mills | Country Liberal | 1999–2014 |
| Nathan Barrett | Country Liberal | 2014–2016 |
| Nathan Barrett | Independent | 2016 |
| Terry Mills | Independent | 2016–2019 |
| Terry Mills | Territory Alliance | 2019–2020 |
| Mark Turner | Labor | 2020–2021 |
| Mark Turner | Independent Labor | 2021–2023 |
| Mark Turner | Independent | 2023–2024 |
| Matthew Kerle | Country Liberal | 2024–present |

== Election results ==
2024 Northern Territory general election: Blain
| Party | Candidate | Votes | % | ±% |
|---|---|---|---|---|
| Country Liberal | Matthew Kerle | 1,895 | 46.5 | +12.9 |
| Independent | Mark Turner | 1,584 | 38.9 | +38.9 |
| Labor | Danielle Eveleigh | 596 | 14.6 | −25.9 |
| Total formal votes | | 4,075 | 96.2 | −0.1 |
| Informal votes | | 161 | 3.8 | +0.1 |
| Turnout | | 4,236 | 65.8 | |
Two-party-preferred result (Note: Estimated two-party-preferred count by Antony Green.)
| Country Liberal | Matthew Kerle | 2,938 | 72.1 | +23.4 |
| Labor | Danielle Eveleigh | 1,137 | 27.9 | −23.4 |
Two-candidate-preferred result
| Country Liberal | Matthew Kerle | 2,106 | 52.0 | +2.2 |
| Independent | Mark Turner | 1,946 | 48.0 | +48.0 |
| Country Liberal gain from Labor | | Swing | +3.3 | |
