= Dheran Young =

Australian politician

Dheran Young MLA

13th Speaker of the Northern Territory Legislative Assembly
- In office 13 February 2024 – 15 October 2024
- Preceded by: Mark Monaghan
- Succeeded by: Robyn Lambley

Member of the Northern Territory Legislative Assembly for Daly
- Incumbent
- Assumed office 11 September 2021
- Preceded by: Ian Sloan

Personal details
- Party: Labor

Dheran Young is an Australian Labor politician who currently serves as MLA for Daly in the Northern Territory Legislative Assembly, having won a by-election in September 2021. He is a Yaegl man, and formerly the Regional Development Manager for the Wadeye Football League. He previously served as Speaker of the Northern Territory Legislative Assembly from February to October 2024.

== Political career ==
After the announcement of the 2021 Daly by-election, following the resignation of the sitting member, Young was declared as the Labor Party candidate for the seat. Before standing in the by-election, Young had served as an advisor to both chief minister Michael Gunner and attorney-general Selena Uibo. After the announcement of Young's candidacy, it was reported that he had allegedly sworn at and threatened Country Liberal MLA Joshua Burgoyne in February 2021. On 23 February 2021, Young apologised for his actions towards Burgoyne, although he denied using swear words.

Young won the by-election, becoming the first government candidate in Northern Territory electoral history to win a seat at a by-election previously held by the opposition.

Northern Territory Legislative Assembly
| Preceded by Mark Monaghan | Speaker of the Northern Territory Legislative Assembly; 2024 | Succeeded by Robyn Lambley |
| Preceded by Ian Sloan | Member for Daly; 2021–present | Incumbent |
