= Ngaree Ah Kit =

Australian politician (born 1981)

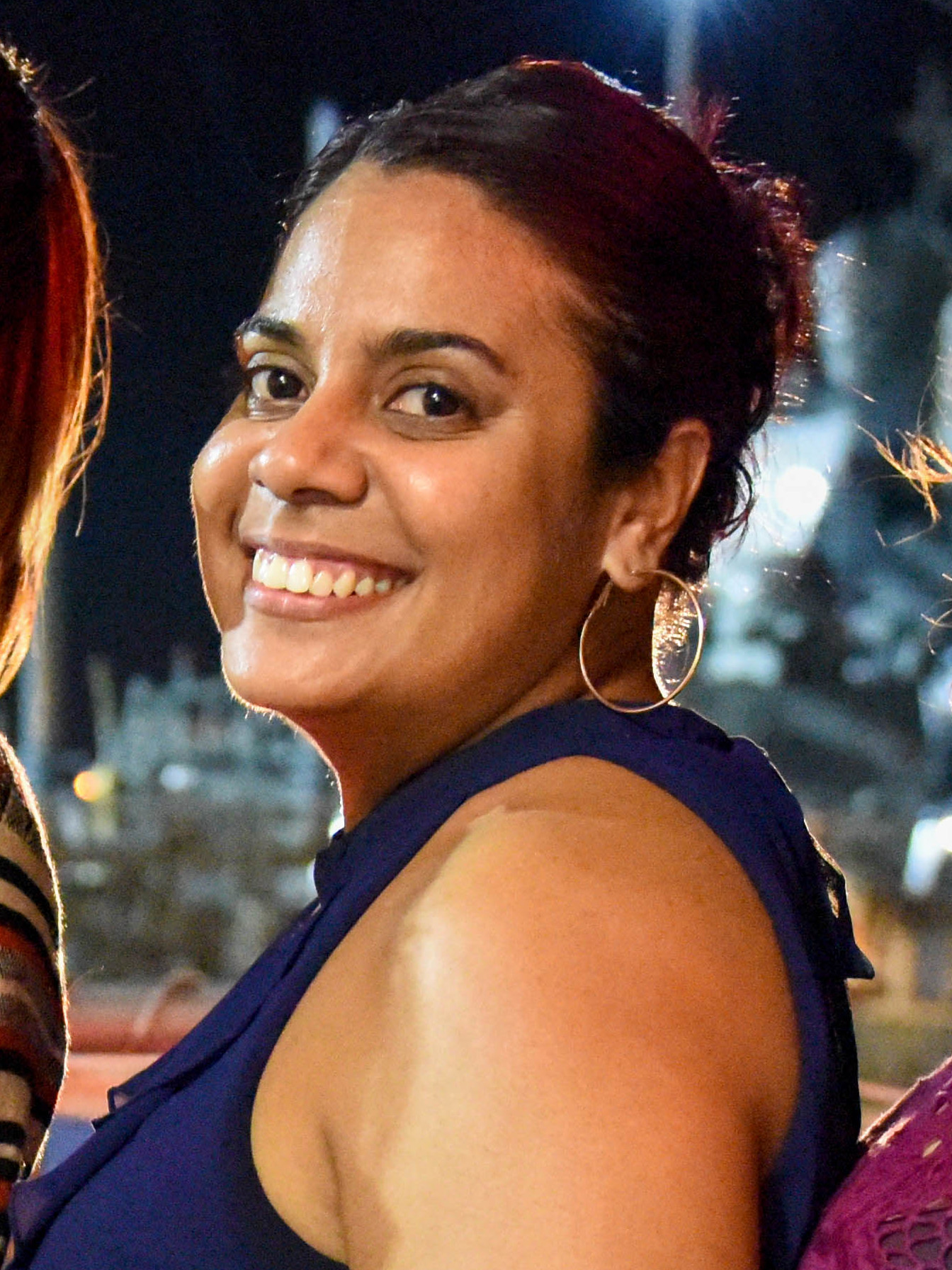
- Ah Kit in 2015

Minister for Corporate and Digital Development, International Education, Disabilities and Multicultural Affairs
- In office 23 May 2022 – August 2024
- Succeeded by: to be appointed

13th Speaker of the Northern Territory Legislative Assembly
- In office 20 August 2020 – 23 May 2022
- Deputy: Mark Turner (2020–21); Joel Bowden (2021–2022)
- Preceded by: Chansey Paech
- Succeeded by: Mark Monaghan

Member of the Northern Territory Legislative Assembly for Karama
- In office 27 August 2016 – 24 August 2024
- Preceded by: Delia Lawrie
- Succeeded by: Brian O'Gallagher

Personal details
- Born: Ngaree Jane Ah Kit; 4 June 1981 (age 44) Katherine, Northern Territory, Australia
- Party: Labor
- Parent: John Ah Kit (father)
- Occupation: Public servant

Ngaree Jane Ah Kit (born 4 June 1981; pronounced [ŋaːrɪː]) is an Australian former politician from the Labor Party. She was elected to the Northern Territory Legislative Assembly representing the electoral division of Karama in Darwin from 2016 to 2024.

== Early life and background ==
Ah Kit was born in Katherine, Northern Territory, and was raised in both Katherine and Darwin. She is of Aboriginal, Torres Strait Islander and Chinese descent, and is the daughter of John Ah Kit, the former Labor member for Arnhem, who was the first Indigenous minister in the Northern Territory from 1995 to 2005. Following her brother's death in 2007, Ah Kit became a suicide prevention advocate, forming a survivors' group in 2007 and the Darwin Region Indigenous Suicide Prevention Network in 2010, and working for the Northern Territory Department of Health.

She was a territory finalist for the Young Australian of the Year awards in 2009 for her work organising NAIDOC Week in the Top End, and a finalist for Australia's Local Hero in 2016 for her suicide prevention work.

Ah Kit is well known in the Northern Territory as an advocate for First Nations community members, Disability and Multicultural Affairs has placed her well for her portfolios. Ah Kit has also been involved in a number of community-controlled organisations serving as board director and spokesperson.

== Political career ==
Ah Kit was sworn in as minister under the Fyles ministry in May 2022 following the resignation of then Chief Minister Michael Gunner.

Ah Kit held the portfolios of Minister for Corporate and Digital Development; Minister for Disabilities; Minister for International Education; Minister for Multicultural Affairs.

She was previously the 13th Speaker of the Northern Territory Legislative Assembly making her the first Aboriginal/Torres Strait Islander woman to be Speaker of an Australian parliament after being elected on 20 October 2020 following the resignation of Chansey Paech. Before that, she was Assistant Minister for Suicide Prevention, Mental Health, Disability, Youth and Seniors.

In the 2024 Northern Territory general election, she was unseated by Country Liberal Party candidate Brian O'Gallagher.

Northern Territory Legislative Assembly
Years	Term	Electoral division	Party
2016–2020	13th	Karama	Labor
2020–2024	14th	Karama	Labor

Northern Territory Legislative Assembly
Preceded by Delia Lawrie	Member for Karama; 2016–2024	Succeeded by Brian O'Gallagher
Preceded by Chansey Paech	Speaker of the Northern Territory Legislative Assembly; 2020–2022	Succeeded by Mark Monaghan
