= Ian Sloan (politician) =

Australian politician

Member of the Northern Territory Legislative Assembly for Daly
- In office 22 August 2020 – 19 August 2021
- Preceded by: Gary Higgins
- Succeeded by: Dheran Young

Personal details
- Born: 24 May 1973 (age 53) Northern Ireland
- Party: Country Liberal
- Education: University of Hertfordshire
- Occupation: Business owner

Ian Sloan (born 24 May 1973) is a former Australian politician who served as MP for the Northern Territory Legislative Assembly electoral division of Daly representing the Country Liberal Party from 2020 to 2021.

== Pre-politics ==
=== Immigration to Australia ===
Sloan visited Australia as a backpacker in 1996. He planned to go to Queensland, however, whilst visiting Darwin, he decided to remain in the town. When he ran out of money, he decided to get a job at soon-to-be opened bar Shennanigans. In 2006, he opened the Virginia Tavern, followed by the Virginia Store in 2011 and the Berry Springs Tavern in 2014.

== Politics ==
Northern Territory Legislative Assembly
Years	Term	Electoral division	Party
2020–2021	14th	Daly	Country Liberal

In January 2020, the then incumbent member for Daly and Leader of the Country Liberal Opposition Gary Higgins announced that, for health reasons, he would retire from politics at the 2020 Northern Territory election. This vacated the seat, and allowed for Sloan to fill in the gap left by Higgins. He then won the election, despite a 5.7% swing against the CLP in the seat.

Sloan resigned from the Legislative Assembly on 19 August 2021, citing health and family reasons. He was replaced in a by-election that Labor won. This was the first time in the history of the Northern Territory that a sitting government won a seat from the opposition in a by-election.

Northern Territory Legislative Assembly
Preceded by Gary Higgins	Member for Daly; 2020–2021	Succeeded by Dheran Young
