= Marie-Clare Boothby =

Australian politician (born 1977)

Marie-Clare Boothby MLA

Attorney-General of the Northern Territory
- Incumbent
- Assumed office 9 September 2024
- Preceded by: Chansey Paech

Member of the Northern Territory Legislative Assembly for Brennan
- Incumbent
- Assumed office 22 August 2020
- Preceded by: Tony Sievers

Personal details
- Born: 20 February 1977 (age 49) Darwin, Northern Territory
- Party: Country Liberal Party
- Children: 2 sons

Marie-Clare Boothby (born 20 February 1977) is an Australian politician in the Northern Territory Legislative Assembly. She currently serves as Attorney-General of the Northern Territory in the Finocchiaro ministry.

Boothby was born and raised in Darwin, and has since moved to live in Palmerston where she lives with her two children.

Prior to her political career, Boothby was a financial adviser, focusing on digital advertising opportunities. She was also the chair of Territory Proud, an organisation of 350 local businesses.

Boothby ran as a candidate in the 2016 Northern Territory general election in the seat of Blain, but lost with an almost 37.9% swing against the CLP. She was subsequently elected to the seat of Brennan at the 2020 election.

Northern Territory Legislative Assembly
| Years | Term | Electoral division | Party |
|---|---|---|---|
| 2020–present | 14th | Brennan | Country Liberal |

== Political views ==
Boothby opposed the Indigenous Voice to Parliament.

Northern Territory Legislative Assembly
| Preceded by Tony Sievers | Member for Brennan; 2020–present | Incumbent |
