= Kate Worden =

Australian politician

The Honourable Kate Worden

Member of the Northern Territory Legislative Assembly for Sanderson
- In office 27 August 2016 – 24 August 2024
- Preceded by: Peter Styles
- Succeeded by: Jinson Charls

Personal details
- Born: United Kingdom
- Party: Labor Party
- Occupation: Business owner and public servant

Kathryn Jane Worden is an Australian politician. She was a Labor member of the Northern Territory Legislative Assembly from 2016 to 2024, representing the electorate of Sanderson.

== Early life and career ==
Worden moved to Australia with her family in 1981, attending school in Adelaide. She moved to Ngukkurr in the Northern Territory in 1985.

Worden was an Alderman on the City of Darwin Council for three years. She was the Chair of the Community and Cultural, and Arts and Cultural Development Committees. She was critical of Lord Mayor Katrina Fong Lim for accepting funding from the CLP Government for a velodrome that has to date still not been updated

Before entering politics, Worden worked at the Northern Territory Department of Housing overseeing complaints and compliance.

Worden has been married twice. She has four children and nine grandchildren.

== Politics ==
Worden challenged Deputy Chief Minister Peter Styles in his seat of Sanderson. She won in a rout, taking over 60 percent of the vote on a swing of over 13 percent amid the CLP's near-meltdown in Darwin, enough to turn Sanderson into a safe Labor seat at one stroke. She actually won enough votes on the first count to take the seat without the need for preferences.

Northern Territory Legislative Assembly
Years	Term	Electoral division	Party
2016–2020	13th	Sanderson	Labor
2020–2024	14th	Sanderson	Labor

Worden consolidated her hold on the seat in 2020, picking up a swing of over eight percent. She was granted the title The Honourable by the Governor-General on 31 March 2026.

Northern Territory Legislative Assembly
Preceded by Peter Styles	Member for Sanderson; 2016–2024	Succeeded by Jinson Charls
