= Mark Turner (politician) =

Australian politician (born 1983)

Mark Turner MLA
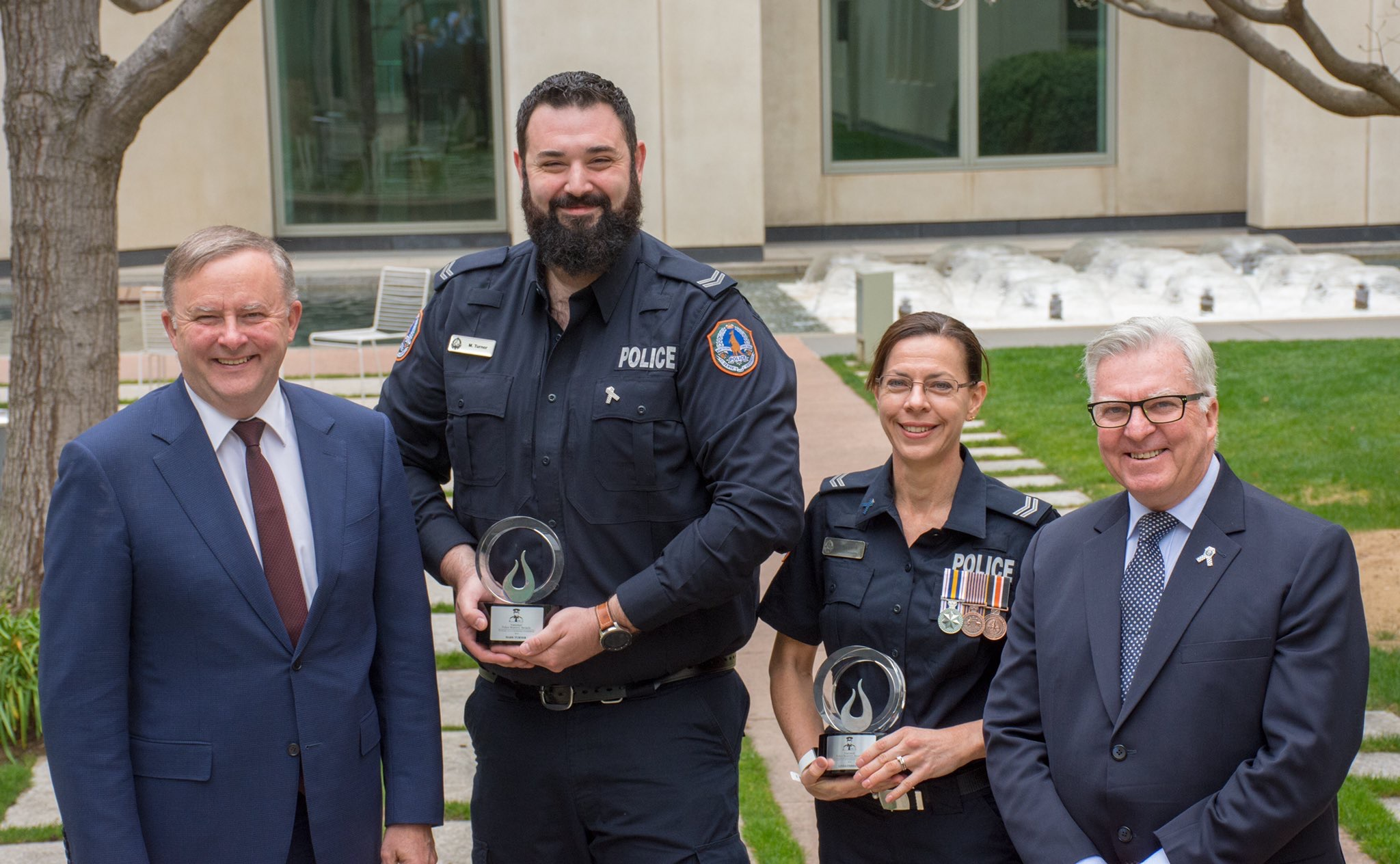
- Turner receiving the National Police Bravery Award, 2019

Member of the Northern Territory Legislative Assembly for Blain
- In office 22 August 2020 – 24 August 2024
- Preceded by: Terry Mills
- Succeeded by: Matthew Kerle

Deputy Speaker of the Northern Territory Legislative Assembly
- In office 20 October 2020 – 18 February 2021
- Preceded by: Ngaree Ah Kit
- Succeeded by: Joel Bowden

Personal details
- Born: August 1983 (age 43) London, England
- Citizenship: Australian
- Party: Independent
- Other political affiliations: Labor (until 2023) (Note: Turner was expelled from the Labor Legislative Assembly group in 2021 but remained a member of the party until 8 June 2023.)
- Occupation: Police officer
- Awards: National Police Bravery Award 2019

Mark Paul Michael Turner (born August 1983) is an Australian politician and former Northern Territory Police negotiator. He was elected as the Labor member for the electoral division of Blain in the Northern Territory Legislative Assembly at the 2020 Northern Territory election.

Turner was raised in West London, by his mother (a nurse) and father (an officer in the Metropolitan Police). Turner also served in the Metropolitan Police at the Southall, Ealing and Acton Police Stations before transferring to the Territorial Support Group then emigrating to Australia. He joined the Western Australia Police who had been heavily recruiting officers from the United Kingdom and after serving in the Kimberley Region of Western Australia he moved across the border joining the Northern Territory Police. Turner served in the township of Katherine and several locations around Arnhem Land before being transferred to Darwin after an injury on duty for surgery to reconstruct a tendon in his left hand.

In September 2019, police negotiators Turner and Linda Farrand were awarded the National Police Bravery Award by the Police Federation of Australia for preventing a suicide on Darwin Esplanade.

Northern Territory Legislative Assembly
Years	Term	Electoral division	Party
2020–2024	14th	Blain	Labor

Later that month, Turner was preselected by the Labor Party to contest the electoral division of Blain at the 2020 Northern Territory general election in August. In November 2019, it was reported that there was an ongoing workers compensation process progressing with the Police, Fire & Emergency Services for worker's compensation of medical costs incurred from the aforementioned tendon ruptured in the line of duty resulting in Turner losing the use of his hand for a number of years whilst undergoing repeated surgery.

At the 2020 election, Turner was elected as the member for Blain, which had previously been held by Territory Alliance leader and former Country Liberal Chief Minister Terry Mills. Turner led the field on the first count, and defeated the CLP candidate collecting about 38% of Mills' preferences despite both Mills and the CLP candidate putting him last on their how to vote cards. He became the first Labor member to hold the seat, which had traditionally been regarded as a CLP stronghold, winning the booths of Bellamack and Rosebery along with the early voting centre and narrowly losing the suburb of Woodroffe.

On 18 February 2021, Turner was expelled from the NT Labor caucus and removed as deputy speaker by chief minister Michael Gunner, following allegations he had engaged in illegal activity during a relationship with a Labor Party staffer. Turner denied any illegal activity but acknowledged an inappropriate relationship. Gunner stated that Turner had "lost my trust. He has lost the trust of the caucus. He is no longer a member of Labor's parliamentary team." Turner was expelled as a member of NT Labor on 8 June 2023.

== Notes ==
Northern Territory Legislative Assembly
Preceded by Terry Mills	Member for Blain; 2020–2024	Succeeded by Matthew Kerle
