= Electoral division of Daly =

Coordinates: 13.75°S 130.69°E

Daly Northern Territory—Legislative Assembly
- Interactive map of boundaries as of the 2024 election
- Territory: Northern Territory
- Created: 2001
- MP: Dheran Young
- Party: Labor Party
- Namesake: Daly River
- Electors: 6,361 (2026)
- Area: 77,395 km^{2} (29,882.4 sq mi)
- Demographic: Remote
Electorates around Daly:
Timor Sea	Goyder	Arafura
Timor Sea	Daly	Katherine; Arnhem
Gwoja	Gwoja	Barkly

Daly is an electoral division of the Legislative Assembly in Australia's Northern Territory. It was created in 2001, and takes its name from the Daly River region which lies at the heart of the electorate. Daly covers some 77,395 km², encompassing the towns of Adelaide River, Acacia Hills, Batchelor, Dundee Beach, Nauiyu Nambiyu, Pine Creek, Timber Creek and Wadeye. There were 6,361 people enrolled in the electorate as of July 2026.

== History ==
Daly is a relatively new electorate in the Northern Territory, having only been created in 2001. It replaced Victoria River, one of the Territory's original seats and best known as the seat of the Territory's first head of government, Goff Letts. It had been abolished when its namesake was moved out of the electorate by a redistribution. While Victoria River had been held by the Labor Party in the past, Daly appeared on paper to be a safe seat for the Country Liberal Party, having been held easily by then-member Tim Baldwin. However, he retired at the 2005 election. While the CLP candidate, Debbi Aloisi, was widely predicted to succeed him, she was ultimately defeated by Labor challenger Rob Knight, who had lost badly to Baldwin in 2001. In the lead-up to the election, there had been almost no suggestion that Knight had any chance of defeating Aloisi. However, on election night the CLP primary vote almost halved, and Knight won on a two-party swing of 24.6 percent—almost unheard of in Australian politics—and turned Daly from a safe CLP seat into a safe Labor seat in one stroke. Knight actually took the seat without the need for preferences. He was re-elected in 2008, but was defeated by CLP candidate Gary Higgins in 2012.

Higgins narrowly weathered the massive Labor wave that swept through the Territory in 2016. He was one of only two CLP members returned at this election, and was named as leader of what remained of the CLP. He retired in 2020, and was succeeded by Ian Sloan, also of the CLP.

Sloan announced his resignation in August 2021, citing health reasons.

== Members for Daly ==
Member	Party	Term
Tim Baldwin	Country Liberal	2001–2005
Rob Knight	Labor	2005–2012
Gary Higgins	Country Liberal	2012–2020
Ian Sloan	Country Liberal	2020–2021
Dheran Young	Labor	2021–present

== Election results ==
2024 Northern Territory general election: Daly
Party	Candidate	Votes	%	±%
Labor	Dheran Young	2,323	52.3	+18.4
Country Liberal	Kris Civitarese	2,119	47.7	+11.7
Total formal votes		4,442	97.1	
Informal votes		131	2.9	
Turnout		4,573	73.4	
Labor hold		Swing	+3.8	
