= Bill Yan =

Australian politician

The Honourable Bill Yan MLA

Treasurer of the Northern Territory
- Incumbent
- Assumed office 9 September 2024
- Preceded by: Lia Finocchiaro

Member of the Northern Territory Legislative Assembly for Namatjira
- Incumbent
- Assumed office 22 August 2020
- Preceded by: Chansey Paech

Personal details
- Party: Country Liberal Party
- Occupation: Corrections officer

Northern Territory Legislative Assembly
Years	Term	Electoral division	Party
2020–present	14th	Namatjira	Country Liberal

William Carl Yan is an Australian politician from the Northern Territory. He has been Treasurer of the Northern Territory since 9 September 2024.

Yan was employed at a correctional facility for 17 years. He joined the Country Liberal Party and ran as a candidate in the electoral division of Namatjira for the 2020 Northern Territory general election. He won the election by a margin of 22 votes, and is currently a member of the Northern Territory Legislative Assembly.

Political offices
Preceded by Lia Finocchiaro	Treasurer of the Northern Territory; 2024–present	Incumbent
Northern Territory Legislative Assembly
Preceded by Chansey Paech	Member for Namatjira; 2020–present	Incumbent
