= Henderson ministry =

- 8th Cabinet of the Northern Territory
- Date formed: 26 November 2007
- Date dissolved: 9 April 2012

People and organisations
- Monarch: Queen Elizabeth II
- Premier: Paul Henderson
- Member party: Labor
- Opposition party: Country Liberal
- Opposition leader: Terry Mills

History
- Election: 2008 election
- Outgoing election: 2012 election
- Predecessor: Martin ministry
- Successor: Mills ministry

The Henderson ministry was the ministry of the eighth Chief Minister of the Northern Territory Australia, Paul Henderson. It was sworn in on 26 November 2007, following the resignation of Clare Martin and her deputy Syd Stirling.

An interim ministry was initially sworn in, lasting for three days after the succession of Henderson and his deputy, Marion Scrymgour, prior to the constitution of a full ministry.

The full ministry saw significant changes from the final Martin ministry, largely due to the decision of Martin and Deputy Chief Minister Syd Stirling to retire to the backbenches while serving out their terms. Delia Lawrie replaced Stirling as Treasurer, while backbenchers Matthew Bonson and Len Kiely were promoted to the ministry. The latter appointment was the cause of some controversy, as Kiely had been forced to resign as Deputy Speaker in 2006 after a sexual harassment incident. Kiely would later lose his seat at the 2008 election in a result largely attributed to the fallout from that scandal. The full ministry also included a number of changes to portfolio makeup; perhaps the most significant being the creation of a ministry for climate change, to be held by Henderson.

On 15 February 2008, following the resignation of Elliot McAdam, Rob Knight was appointed to the ministry.

The Henderson government was re-elected at the 2008 election, but three ministers were defeated: Chris Natt, Len Kiely and Matthew Bonson. The three vacancies were notably filled by three indigenous MLAs, Malarndirri McCarthy, Alison Anderson and Karl Hampton.

The Ministry ended when the Henderson government was defeated at the 2012 Northern Territory election, and was succeeded by the Mills Ministry on 4 September 2012.

== First (interim) ministry (26 November 2007 – 29 November 2007) ==
The interim ministry operated from 26 November 2007 until 29 November 2007.

Office	Minister
Hon Paul Henderson, MLA	Chief Minister; Minister for Police, Fire and Emergency Services; Minister for Asian Relations and Trade; Minister for the AustralAsia Railway; Minister for Indigenous Policy; Minister for Major Projects; Treasurer; Minister for Justice and Attorney-General; Minister for Statehood; Minister for Employment, Education and Training; Minister for Tourism; Minister for Public Employment; Minister for Multicultural Affairs
Hon Dr Chris Burns, MLA	Minister for Health; Minister for Racing, Gaming and Licensing; Minister for Alcohol Policy
Hon Kon Vatskalis, MLA	Minister for Business and Economic Development; Minister for Regional Development; Minister for Defence Support; Minister for Sport and Recreation; Minister for Essential Services
Hon Delia Lawrie, MLA	Minister for Planning and Lands; Minister for Infrastructure and Transport; Minister for Natural Resources, Environment and Heritage; Minister for Parks and Wildlife
Hon Marion Scrymgour, MLA	Minister for Family and Community Services; Minister for Child Protection; Minister for Arts and Museums; Minister for Women's Policy; Minister for Senior Territorians; Minister for Young Territorians
Hon Elliot McAdam, MLA	Minister for Local Government; Minister for Housing; Minister for Central Australia; Minister for Corporate and Information Services; Minister for Communications; Minister assisting the Chief Minister on Indigenous Policy
Hon Chris Natt, MLA	Minister for Primary Industry and Fisheries; Minister for Mines and Energy

== Second ministry (30 November 2007 – 14 February 2008) ==
Office	Minister
Hon Paul Henderson, MLA	Chief Minister; Minister for Police, Fire and Emergency Services; Minister for Major Projects and Trade; Minister for Climate Change; Minister for Territory-Federal Relations and Statehood; Minister for Multicultural Affairs
Hon Marion Scrymgour, MLA	Minister for Employment, Education and Training; Minister for Family and Community Services; Minister for Child Protection; Minister for Indigenous Policy; Minister for Arts and Museums; Minister for Women's Policy
Hon Delia Lawrie, MLA	Treasurer; Minister for Planning and Lands; Minister for Infrastructure and Transport; Minister for Public Employment
Hon Dr Chris Burns, MLA	Minister for Health; Minister for Justice and Attorney-General; Minister for Racing, Gaming and Licensing; Minister for Alcohol Policy
Hon Kon Vatskalis, MLA	Minister for Business and Economic Development; Minister for Tourism; Minister for Asian Relations; Minister for Regional Development; Minister for Defence Support; Minister for Essential Services
Hon Elliot McAdam, MLA	Minister for Local Government; Minister for Housing; Minister for Central Australia; Minister for Corporate and Information Services; Minister for Communications
Hon Chris Natt, MLA	Minister for Primary Industry and Fisheries; Minister for Mines and Energy
Hon Len Kiely, MLA	Minister for Natural Resources, Environment and Heritage; Minister for Parks and Wildlife
Hon Matthew Bonson, MLA	Minister for Sport and Recreation; Minister for Senior Territorians; Minister for Young Territorians; Minister assisting the Chief Minister on Multicultural Affairs

== Third ministry (15 February 2008 – 30 June 2008) ==
Office	Minister
Hon Paul Henderson, MLA	Chief Minister; Minister for Police, Fire and Emergency Services; Minister for Major Projects and Trade; Minister for Climate Change; Minister for Territory-Federal Relations and Statehood; Minister for Information, Communications and Technology Policy; Minister for Multicultural Affairs
Hon Marion Scrymgour, MLA	Minister for Employment, Education and Training; Minister for Family and Community Services; Minister for Child Protection; Minister for Indigenous Policy; Minister for Arts and Museums; Minister for Women's Policy
Hon Delia Lawrie, MLA	Treasurer; Minister for Planning and Lands; Minister for Infrastructure and Transport; Minister for Public Employment
Hon Dr Chris Burns, MLA	Minister for Health; Minister for Justice and Attorney-General; Minister for Racing, Gaming and Licensing; Minister for Alcohol Policy
Hon Kon Vatskalis, MLA	Minister for Business and Economic Development; Minister for Tourism; Minister for Housing; Minister for Asian Relations; Minister for Regional Development; Minister for Defence Support; Minister for Essential Services
Hon Chris Natt, MLA	Minister for Primary Industry and Fisheries; Minister for Mines and Energy
Hon Len Kiely, MLA	Minister for Natural Resources, Environment and Heritage; Minister for Parks and Wildlife
Hon Matthew Bonson, MLA	Minister for Sport and Recreation; Minister for Corporate and Information Services; Minister for Senior Territorians; Minister for Young Territorians; Minister assisting the Chief Minister on Multicultural Affairs
Hon Rob Knight, MLA	Minister for Local Government; Minister for Central Australia

== Fourth ministry (1 July 2008 – 17 August 2008) ==
Office	Minister
Hon Paul Henderson, MLA	Chief Minister; Minister for Police, Fire and Emergency Services; Minister for Major Projects and Trade; Minister for Climate Change; Minister for Territory-Federal Relations and Statehood; Minister for Information, Communications and Technology Policy; Minister for Multicultural Affairs
Hon Marion Scrymgour, MLA	Minister for Employment, Education and Training; Minister for Children and Families; Minister for Child Protection; Minister for Indigenous Policy; Minister for Arts and Museums; Minister for Women's Policy
Hon Delia Lawrie, MLA	Treasurer; Minister for Planning and Lands; Minister for Infrastructure and Transport; Minister for Public Employment
Hon Dr Chris Burns, MLA	Minister for Health; Minister for Justice and Attorney-General; Minister for Racing, Gaming and Licensing; Minister for Alcohol Policy
Hon Kon Vatskalis, MLA	Minister for Business and Economic Development; Minister for Tourism; Minister for Housing; Minister for Asian Relations; Minister for Regional Development; Minister for Defence Support; Minister for Essential Services
Hon Chris Natt, MLA	Minister for Primary Industry and Fisheries; Minister for Mines and Energy
Hon Len Kiely, MLA	Minister for Natural Resources, Environment and Heritage; Minister for Parks and Wildlife
Hon Matthew Bonson, MLA	Minister for Sport and Recreation; Minister for Corporate and Information Services; Minister for Senior Territorians; Minister for Young Territorians; Minister assisting the Chief Minister on Multicultural Affairs
Hon Rob Knight, MLA	Minister for Local Government; Minister for Central Australia

== Fifth ministry (18 August 2008 – 3 February 2009) ==
Minister	Office
Hon Paul Henderson, MLA	Chief Minister; Minister for Police, Fire and Emergency Services; Minister for Major Projects, Trade and Economic Development; Minister for Climate Change; Minister for Territory-Federal Relations; Minister for Multicultural Affairs
Hon Marion Scrymgour, MLA	Deputy Chief Minister; Minister for Education and Training; Minister for Indigenous Policy; Minister for Arts and Museums
Hon Delia Lawrie, MLA	Treasurer; Minister for Lands and Planning; Minister for Transport and Infrastructure
Hon Dr Chris Burns, MLA	Minister for Justice and Attorney-General; Minister for Health; Minister for Racing, Gaming and Licensing; Minister for Alcohol Policy
Hon Kon Vatskalis, MLA	Minister for Business and Employment; Minister for Primary Industry, Fisheries and Resources; Minister for Tourism; Minister for Asian Relations; Minister for Defence Support
Hon Rob Knight, MLA	Minister for Housing; Minister for Local Government; Minister for Essential Services; Minister for Public Employment
Hon Malarndirri McCarthy, MLA	Minister for Children and Families; Minister for Child Protection; Minister for Statehood; Minister for Senior Territorians; Minister for Young Territorians; Minister for Women's Policy; Minister Assisting the Chief Minister on Multicultural Affairs
Hon Alison Anderson, MLA	Minister for Natural Resources, Environment and Heritage; Minister for Parks and Wildlife; Minister for Central Australia
Hon Karl Hampton, MLA	Minister for Regional Development; Minister for Sport and Recreation; Minister for Information, Communications and Technology Policy; Minister Assisting the Chief Minister on Major Projects and Economic Development

== Sixth ministry (4 February 2009 – 8 February 2009) ==
Minister	Office
Hon Paul Henderson, MLA	Chief Minister; Minister for Police, Fire and Emergency Services; Minister for Major Projects, Employment and Economic Development; Minister for Education and Training; Minister for Climate Change; Minister for Territory-Federal Relations; Minister for Multicultural Affairs
Hon Marion Scrymgour, MLA	Deputy Chief Minister; Minister for Justice and Attorney-General; Minister for Indigenous Policy; Minister for Racing, Gaming and Licensing; Minister for Alcohol Policy
Hon Delia Lawrie, MLA	Treasurer; Minister for Planning and Lands; Minister for Infrastructure and Transport
Hon Dr Chris Burns, MLA	Minister for Business; Minister for Tourism; Minister for Trade; Minister for Asian Relations; Minister for Defence Support
Hon Kon Vatskalis, MLA	Minister for Health; Minister for Primary Industry, Fisheries and Resources
Hon Rob Knight, MLA	Minister for Housing; Minister for Local Government; Minister for Essential Services; Minister for Public Employment
Hon Malarndirri McCarthy, MLA	Minister for Children and Families; Minister for Child Protection; Minister for Statehood; Minister for Senior Territorians; Minister for Young Territorians; Minister for Women's Policy; Minister Assisting the Chief Minister on Multicultural Affairs
Hon Alison Anderson, MLA	Minister for Natural Resources, Environment and Heritage; Minister for Parks and Wildlife; Minister for Arts and Museums; Minister for Central Australia
Hon Karl Hampton, MLA	Minister for Regional Development; Minister for Sport and Recreation; Minister for Information, Communications and Technology Policy; Minister Assisting the Chief Minister on Major Projects and Economic Development

== Seventh ministry (9 February 2009 – 5 August 2009) ==
Minister	Office
Hon Paul Henderson, MLA	Chief Minister; Minister for Police, Fire and Emergency Services; Minister for Major Projects, Employment and Economic Development; Minister for Education and Training; Minister for Climate Change; Minister for Territory-Federal Relations; Minister for Multicultural Affairs
Hon Delia Lawrie, MLA	Deputy Chief Minister; Treasurer; Minister for Justice and Attorney-General; Minister for Planning and Lands; Minister for Infrastructure
Hon Dr Chris Burns, MLA	Leader of Government Business; Minister for Business; Minister for Tourism; Minister for Trade; Minister for Asian Relations; Minister for Defence Support
Hon Kon Vatskalis, MLA	Minister for Health; Minister for Primary Industry, Fisheries and Resources; Minister for Racing, Gaming and Licensing; Minister for Alcohol Policy
Hon Rob Knight, MLA	Minister for Housing; Minister for Local Government; Minister for Essential Services; Minister for Public Employment
Hon Malarndirri McCarthy, MLA	Minister for Children and Families; Minister for Child Protection; Minister for Statehood; Minister for Senior Territorians; Minister for Young Territorians; Minister for Women's Policy; Minister for Minister Assisting the Chief Minister on Multicultural Affairs and Education
Hon Alison Anderson, MLA	Minister for Natural Resources, Environment and Heritage; Minister for Parks and Wildlife; Minister for Arts and Museums; Minister for Indigenous Policy
Hon Karl Hampton, MLA	Minister for Regional Development; Minister for Sport and Recreation; Minister for Information, Communications and Technology Policy; Minister Assisting the Chief Minister on Major Projects and Economic Development; Minister for Central Australia
Hon Gerry McCarthy, MLA	Minister for Transport; Minister for Correctional Services

== Eighth ministry (6 August 2009 – 3 December 2009) ==
A reshuffle occurred following the resignation of Alison Anderson from Cabinet on 6 August 2009.

Minister	Office
Hon Paul Henderson, MLA	Chief Minister; Minister for Police, Fire and Emergency Services; Minister for Major Projects, Employment and Economic Development; Minister for Education and Training; Minister for Climate Change; Minister for Territory-Federal Relations; Minister for Multicultural Affairs
Hon Delia Lawrie, MLA	Deputy Chief Minister; Treasurer; Minister for Justice and Attorney-General; Minister for Planning and Lands; Minister for Infrastructure
Hon Dr Chris Burns, MLA	Leader of Government Business; Minister for Business; Minister for Tourism; Minister for Trade; Minister for Asian Relations; Minister for Defence Support
Hon Kon Vatskalis, MLA	Minister for Health; Minister for Primary Industry, Fisheries and Resources; Minister for Racing, Gaming and Licensing; Minister for Alcohol Policy
Hon Rob Knight, MLA	Minister for Housing; Minister for Local Government; Minister for Essential Services; Minister for Public Employment
Hon Malarndirri McCarthy, MLA	Minister for Children and Families; Minister for Child Protection; Minister for Statehood; Minister for Women's Policy; Minister for Indigenous Policy
Hon Karl Hampton, MLA	Minister for Regional Development; Minister for Sport and Recreation; Minister for Information, Communications and Technology Policy; Minister Assisting the Chief Minister on Major Projects and Economic Development; Minister for Central Australia; Minister for Natural Resources, Environment and Heritage; Minister for Parks and Wildlife
Hon Gerry McCarthy, MLA	Minister for Transport; Minister for Correctional Services; Minister for Arts and Museums; Minister for Senior Territorians; Minister for Young Territorians; Minister Assisting the Chief Minister on Multicultural Affairs and Education

== Ninth ministry (4 December 2009 – 8 February 2010) ==
Minister	Office
Hon Paul Henderson, MLA	Chief Minister; Minister for Police, Fire and Emergency Services; Minister for Major Projects and Economic Development; Minister for Multicultural Affairs; Minister for Defence Liaison
Hon Delia Lawrie, MLA	Deputy Chief Minister; Treasurer; Minister for Justice and Attorney-General; Minister for Racing, Gaming and Licensing; Minister for Alcohol Policy
Hon Dr Chris Burns, MLA	Leader of Government Business; Minister for Education and Training; Minister for Public and Affordable Housing; Minister for Public Employment
Hon Kon Vatskalis, MLA	Minister for Health; Minister for Children and Families; Minister for Child Protection; Minister for Primary Industry, Fisheries and Resources
Hon Rob Knight, MLA	Minister for Business and Employment; Minister for Trade; Minister for Asian Relations; Minister for Essential Services; Minister for Defence Support; Minister for Senior Territorians; Minister for Young Territorians
Hon Malarndirri McCarthy, MLA	Minister for Local Government; Minister for Regional Development; Minister for Indigenous Development; Minister for Tourism; Minister for Women's Policy; Minister for Statehood
Hon Karl Hampton, MLA	Minister for Natural Resources, Environment and Heritage; Minister for Parks and Wildlife; Minister for Climate Change; Minister for Sport and Recreation; Minister for Information, Communications and Technology Policy; Minister for Central Australia
Hon Gerry McCarthy, MLA	Minister for Lands and Planning; Minister for Transport; Minister for Construction; Minister for Correctional Services; Minister for Arts and Museums

== Tenth ministry (9 February 2010 – 27 October 2011) ==
Minister	Office
Hon Paul Henderson, MLA	Chief Minister; Minister for Police, Fire and Emergency Services; Minister for Major Projects and Economic Development; Minister for Multicultural Affairs; Minister for Defence Liaison
Hon Delia Lawrie, MLA	Deputy Chief Minister; Treasurer; Minister for Justice and Attorney-General; Minister for Racing, Gaming and Licensing; Minister for Alcohol Policy
Hon Dr Chris Burns, MLA	Leader of Government Business; Minister for Education and Training; Minister for Public and Affordable Housing; Minister for Public Employment
Hon Kon Vatskalis, MLA	Minister for Health; Minister for Children and Families; Minister for Child Protection; Minister for Primary Industry, Fisheries and Resources
Hon Rob Knight, MLA	Minister for Business and Employment; Minister for Trade; Minister for Asian Relations; Minister for Essential Services; Minister for Defence Support; Minister for Senior Territorians; Minister for Young Territorians
Hon Malarndirri McCarthy, MLA	Minister for Local Government; Minister for Regional Development; Minister for Indigenous Development; Minister for Tourism; Minister for Women's Policy; Minister for Statehood
Hon Karl Hampton, MLA	Minister for Natural Resources, Environment and Heritage; Minister for Parks and Wildlife; Minister for Climate Change; Minister for Sport and Recreation; Minister for Information, Communications and Technology Policy; Minister for Central Australia
Hon Gerry McCarthy, MLA	Minister for Lands and Planning; Minister for Transport; Minister for Construction; Minister for Correctional Services; Minister for Arts and Museums

== Eleventh ministry (28 October 2011 – 28 August 2012) ==
Minister	Office
Hon Paul Henderson, MLA	Chief Minister; Minister for Police, Fire and Emergency Services; Minister for Major Projects and Economic Development; Minister for Multicultural Affairs; Minister for Defence Liaison
Hon Delia Lawrie, MLA	Deputy Chief Minister; Treasurer; Minister for Business and Employment; Minister for Trade; Minister for Asian Relations; Minister for Racing, Gaming and Licensing; Minister for Alcohol Policy; Minister for Defence Support
Hon Dr Chris Burns, MLA	Leader of Government Business; Minister for Education and Training; Minister for Public and Affordable Housing; Minister for Public Employment
Hon Kon Vatskalis, MLA	Minister for Health; Minister for Children and Families; Minister for Child Protection; Minister for Primary Industry, Fisheries and Resources
Hon Rob Knight, MLA	Minister for Justice and Attorney-General; Minister for Essential Services; Minister for Senior Territorians; Minister for Young Territorians
Hon Malarndirri McCarthy, MLA	Minister for Local Government; Minister for Regional Development; Minister for Indigenous Development; Minister for Tourism; Minister for Women's Policy; Minister for Statehood
Hon Karl Hampton, MLA	Minister for Natural Resources, Environment and Heritage; Minister for Parks and Wildlife; Minister for Climate Change; Minister for Sport and Recreation; Minister for Information, Communications and Technology Policy; Minister for Central Australia
Hon Gerry McCarthy, MLA	Minister for Lands and Planning; Minister for Transport; Minister for Construction; Minister for Correctional Services; Minister for Arts and Museums
