= Mills ministry =

Former government of the Northern Territory

- 9th Cabinet of the Northern Territory
- Date formed: 12 February 2012
- Date dissolved: 14 March 2013

People and organisations
- Monarch: Queen Elizabeth II
- Premier: Terry Mills
- Member party: Country Liberal
- Opposition party: Labor
- Opposition leader: Michael Gunner

History
- Election: 2012 election
- Predecessor: Henderson ministry
- Successor: Giles ministry

The Mills ministry was the ministry of the ninth Chief Minister of the Northern Territory, Terry Mills. It came into operation on 4 September, following the election of the Mills Country Liberal government in the 2012 election. Terry Mills and Robyn Lambley were sworn in as Chief Minister and Deputy Chief Minister respectively on 29 August 2012.

A reshuffle took place on 6 March 2013 following the resignation of Robyn Lambley as Deputy Chief Minister and Treasurer, and the expulsion from cabinet of Dave Tollner after a heated disagreement with Mills.

On 12 March 2013, Mills was replaced as Chief Minister by Adam Giles.

== Interim ministry (29 August 2012 – 3 September 2012) ==
| Minister | Office |
|---|---|
| Hon Terry Mills, MLA | Chief Minister; Minister for Police, Fire and Emergency Services; Minister for Major Projects and Economic Development; Minister for Multicultural Affairs; Minister for Defence Liaison; Treasurer; Minister for Business and Employment; Minister for Trade; Minister for Asian Relations; Minister for Racing, Gaming and Licensing; Minister for Alcohol Policy; Minister for Defence Support; Minister for Public and Affordable Housing; Minister for Public Employment; Minister for Children and Families; Minister for Child Protection; Minister for Primary Industry, Fisheries and Resources; Minister for Justice and Attorney-General; Minister for Essential Services; Minister for Senior Territorians; Minister for Young Territorians; Minister for Local Government; Minister for Regional Development; Minister for Indigenous Development; Minister for Tourism and Major Events; Minister for Women's Policy; Minister for Statehood; Minister for Natural Resources, Environment and Heritage; Parks and Wildlife; Minister for Climate Change; Minister for Sport and Recreation; Minister for Information, Communications and Technology Policy; Minister for Central Australia; Minister for Lands and Planning; Minister for Transport; Minister for Construction; Minister for Correctional Services; Minister for Arts and Museums |
| Hon Robyn Lambley, MLA | Deputy Chief Minister; Minister for Education and Training; Minister for Health |

== First ministry (4 September 2012 – 1 October 2012) ==
| Minister | Office |
|---|---|
| Hon Terry Mills, MLA | Chief Minister; Minister for Police, Fire and Emergency Services; Minister for Public Employment; Minister for Lands, Planning and the Environment; Minister for Land Resource Management; Minister for Asian Engagement; Minister for Statehood; Minister for Multicultural Affairs; Minister for Young Territorians; Minister for Senior Territorians |
| Hon Robyn Lambley, MLA | Deputy Chief Minister; Treasurer; Minister for Education; Minister for Families and Children; Minister for Corporate and Information Services; Minister for Central Australia; Minister for Women's Policy |
| Hon John Elferink, MLA | Attorney-General and Minister for Justice; Minister for Correctional Services |
| Hon Dave Tollner, MLA | Minister for Health; Minister for Alcohol Policy; Minister for Essential Services |
| Hon Adam Giles, MLA | Minister for Transport; Minister for Infrastructure; Minister for Local Government |
| Hon Willem Westra van Holthe, MLA | Minister for Primary Industry and Fisheries; Minister for Mines and Energy |
| Hon Matt Conlan, MLA | Minister for Tourism and Major Events; Arts and Museums; Minister for Sport and Recreation; Minister for Racing; Parks and Wildlife |
| Hon Peter Chandler, MLA | Minister for Business; Minister for Trade; Minister for Economic Development; Minister for Employment and Training; Minister for Housing |
| Hon Alison Anderson, MLA | Minister for Regional Development; Minister for Indigenous Advancement |

== Second ministry (2 October 2012 – 13 December 2012) ==
| Minister | Office |
|---|---|
| Hon Terry Mills, MLA | Chief Minister; Minister for Police, Fire and Emergency Services; Minister for Public Employment; Minister for Lands, Planning and the Environment; Minister for Land Resource Management; Minister for Asian Engagement; Minister for Defence Liaison; Minister for Statehood; Minister for Multicultural Affairs; Minister for Young Territorians; Minister for Senior Territorians |
| Hon Robyn Lambley, MLA | Deputy Chief Minister; Treasurer; Minister for Education; Minister for Children and Families; Minister for Corporate and Information Services; Minister for Central Australia; Minister for Women's Policy |
| Hon John Elferink, MLA | Attorney-General and Minister for Justice; Minister for Correctional Services |
| Hon Dave Tollner, MLA | Minister for Health; Minister for Alcohol Policy; Minister for Essential Services |
| Hon Adam Giles, MLA | Minister for Transport; Minister for Infrastructure; Minister for Local Government |
| Hon Willem Westra van Holthe, MLA | Minister for Primary Industry and Fisheries; Minister for Mines and Energy |
| Hon Matt Conlan, MLA | Minister for Tourism and Major Events; Arts and Museums; Minister for Sport and Recreation; Minister for Racing; Parks and Wildlife |
| Hon Peter Chandler, MLA | Minister for Business; Minister for Trade; Minister for Economic Development; Minister for Employment and Training; Minister for Housing |
| Hon Alison Anderson, MLA | Minister for Regional Development; Minister for Indigenous Advancement |

== Third ministry (14 December 2012 – 6 March 2013) ==
| Minister | Office |
|---|---|
| Hon Terry Mills, MLA | Chief Minister; Minister for Police, Fire and Emergency Services; Minister for Asian Engagement; Minister for Defence Liaison; Minister for Statehood; Minister for Multicultural Affairs; Minister for Young Territorians; Minister for Senior Territorians |
| Hon Robyn Lambley, MLA | Deputy Chief Minister; Treasurer; Minister for Central Australia; Minister for Public Employment; Minister for Children and Families |
| Hon John Elferink, MLA | Attorney-General and Minister for Justice; Minister for Education; Minister for Correctional Services |
| Hon Dave Tollner, MLA | Minister for Health; Minister for Alcohol Rehabilitation and Policy; Minister for Housing |
| Hon Adam Giles, MLA | Minister for Transport; Minister for Infrastructure; Minister for Local Government; Minister for Corporate and Information Services |
| Hon Willem Westra van Holthe, MLA | Minister for Primary Industry and Fisheries; Minister for Mines and Energy; Minister for Land Resource Management; Minister for Essential Services |
| Hon Matt Conlan, MLA | Minister for Tourism and Major Events; Arts and Museums; Minister for Sport and Recreation; Minister for Racing; Parks and Wildlife |
| Hon Peter Chandler, MLA | Minister for Business; Minister for Lands, Planning and the Environment; Minister for Employment and Training |
| Hon Alison Anderson, MLA | Minister for Regional Development; Minister for Indigenous Advancement; Minister for Women's Policy |

== Fourth ministry (6 March 2013 – 12 March 2013) ==
| Office | Minister |
|---|---|
| Hon Terry Mills, MLA | Chief Minister; Minister for Police, Fire and Emergency Services; Minister for Asian Engagement; Minister for Economic Development (Major Projects); Minister for Defence Liaison; Multicultural Affairs |
| Hon Willem Westra van Holthe, MLA | Deputy Chief Minister; Minister for Trade; Minister for Primary Industry and Fisheries; Minister for Mines and Energy; Minister for Land Resource Management; Minister for Public Employment; Minister for Essential Services |
| Hon John Elferink, MLA | Treasurer; Attorney-General and Minister for Justice; Minister for Corporate and Information Services; Minister for Correctional Services |
| Hon Robyn Lambley, MLA | Minister for Health; Minister for Alcohol Rehabilitation and Policy; Minister for Business; Minister for Employment and Training |
| Hon Peter Chandler, MLA | Minister for Lands, Planning and the Environment; Minister for Housing; Minister for Education |
| Hon Adam Giles, MLA | Minister for Transport; Minister for Infrastructure; Minister for Local Government |
| Hon Alison Anderson, MLA | Minister for Regional Development; Minister for Indigenous Advancement; Minister for Children and Families; Minister for Women's Policy |
| Hon Matt Conlan, MLA | Minister for Tourism and Major Events; Parks and Wildlife; Arts and Museums; Minister for Central Australia |
| Hon Lia Finocchiaro, MLA | Minister for Sport and Recreation; Minister for Racing; Minister for Statehood; Minister for Young Territorians; Minister for Senior Territorians |
