= Giles ministry =

- 10th Cabinet of the Northern Territory
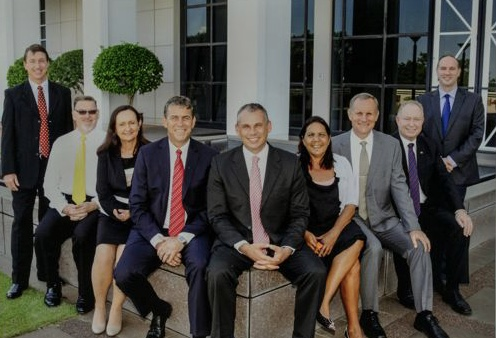
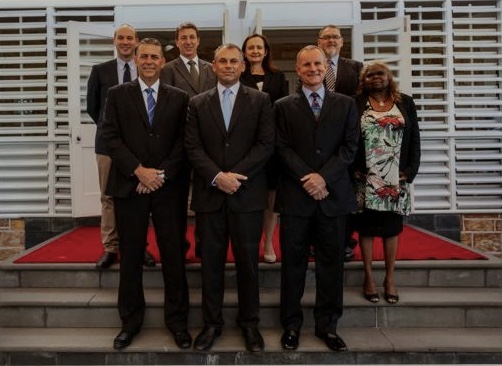
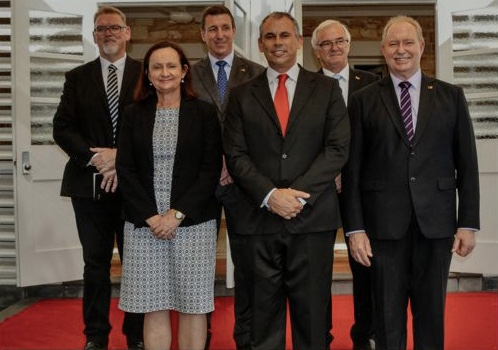
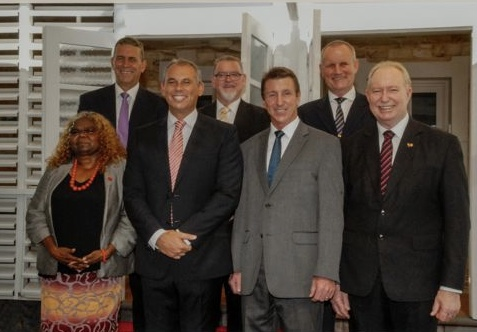
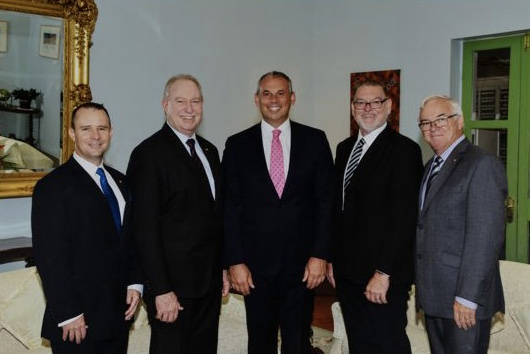
- Date formed: 14 March 2013
- Date dissolved: 31 August 2016

People and organisations
- Monarch: Queen Elizabeth II
- Premier: Adam Giles
- Member party: Country Liberal
- Opposition party: Labor
- Opposition leader: Michael Gunner

History
- Election: 2012 election
- Outgoing election: 2016 election
- Predecessor: Mills ministry
- Successor: Gunner ministry

The Giles ministry was the ministry of the tenth Chief Minister of the Northern Territory, Adam Giles. It came into operation on 14 March 2013, following the replacement of Terry Mills as Chief Minister and leader of the Country Liberal Party by Adam Giles. It ended on 31 August 2016, when Labor leader Michael Gunner became Chief Minister following his victory at the 2016 election.

== First ministry (14 March 2013 – 19 March 2013) ==
| Minister | Office |
|---|---|
| Hon Adam Giles, MLA | Chief Minister; Minister for Police, Fire and Emergency Services; Minister for Corporate Information Services; Minister for Trade; Minister for Economic Development (Major Projects); Minister for Asian Engagement; Minister for Transport; Minister for Public Employment; Minister for Statehood; Minister for Central Australia; Minister for Sport and Recreation; Minister for Racing |
| Hon Dave Tollner, MLA | Deputy Chief Minister; Treasurer; Minister for Business; Minister for Employment and Training; Minister for Defence Liaison and Defence Industry Support |
| Hon John Elferink, MLA | Attorney-General and Minister for Justice; Minister for Correctional Services |
| Hon Robyn Lambley, MLA | Minister for Health; Minister for Alcohol Rehabilitation and Policy |
| Hon Peter Chandler, MLA | Minister for Education; Minister for Housing; Minister for Lands, Planning and the Environment |
| Hon Willem Westra van Holthe, MLA | Minister for Primary Industry and Fisheries; Minister for Mines and Energy; Minister for Land Resource Management; Minister for Essential Services |
| Hon Alison Anderson, MLA | Minister for Children and Families; Minister for Regional Development; Minister for Local Government; Minister for Women's Policy |
| Hon Matt Conlan, MLA | Minister for Tourism and Major Events; Minister for Parks and Wildlife; Minister for Arts and Museums |
| Hon Peter Styles, MLA | Minister for Infrastructure; Minister for Multicultural Affairs; Minister for Senior Territorians; Minister for Young Territorians |

== Second ministry (20 March 2013 – 8 August 2013) ==
| Minister | Office |
|---|---|
| Hon Adam Giles, MLA | Chief Minister; Minister for Police, Fire and Emergency Services; Minister for Corporate Information Services; Minister for Trade; Minister for Economic Development (Major Projects); Minister for Asian Engagement; Minister for Transport |
| Hon Dave Tollner, MLA | Deputy Chief Minister; Treasurer; Minister for Business; Minister for Employment and Training; Minister for Defence Liaison and Defence Industry Support |
| Hon John Elferink, MLA | Attorney-General and Minister for Justice; Minister for Public Employment; Minister for Correctional Services; Minister for Statehood |
| Hon Robyn Lambley, MLA | Minister for Health; Minister for Alcohol Rehabilitation |
| Hon Peter Chandler, MLA | Minister for Education; Minister for Housing; Minister for Lands, Planning and the Environment |
| Hon Willem Westra van Holthe, MLA | Minister for Primary Industry and Fisheries; Minister for Mines and Energy; Minister for Land Resource Management; Minister for Essential Services |
| Hon Alison Anderson, MLA | Minister for Children and Families; Minister for Regional Development; Minister for Local Government; Minister for Women's Policy |
| Hon Matt Conlan, MLA | Minister for Central Australia; Minister for Tourism and Major Events; Minister for Sport and Recreation; Minister for Racing; Minister for Parks and Wildlife; Minister for Arts and Museums |
| Hon Peter Styles, MLA | Minister for Infrastructure; Minister for Multicultural Affairs; Minister for Senior Territorians; Minister for Young Territorians |

== Third ministry (9 August 2013 – 9 September 2013) ==
| Minister | Office |
|---|---|
| Hon Adam Giles, MLA | Chief Minister; Minister for Police, Fire and Emergency Services; Minister for Corporate Information Services; Minister for Trade; Minister for Economic Development (Major Projects); Minister for Asian Engagement; Minister for Transport |
| Hon Dave Tollner, MLA | Deputy Chief Minister; Treasurer; Minister for Business; Minister for Employment and Training; Minister for Defence Liaison and Defence Industry Support; Minister for Alcohol Policy |
| Hon John Elferink, MLA | Attorney-General and Minister for Justice; Minister for Public Employment; Minister for Correctional Services; Minister for Statehood |
| Hon Robyn Lambley, MLA | Minister for Health; Minister for Alcohol Rehabilitation |
| Hon Peter Chandler, MLA | Minister for Education; Minister for Housing; Minister for Lands, Planning and the Environment |
| Hon Willem Westra van Holthe, MLA | Minister for Primary Industry and Fisheries; Minister for Mines and Energy; Minister for Land Resource Management; Minister for Essential Services |
| Hon Alison Anderson, MLA | Minister for Children and Families; Minister for Regional Development; Minister for Local Government; Minister for Women's Policy |
| Hon Matt Conlan, MLA | Minister for Central Australia; Minister for Tourism and Major Events; Minister for Sport and Recreation; Minister for Racing; Minister for Parks and Wildlife; Minister for Arts and Museums |
| Hon Peter Styles, MLA | Minister for Infrastructure; Minister for Multicultural Affairs; Minister for Senior Territorians; Minister for Young Territorians |

== Fourth ministry (10 September 2013 – 15 September 2013) ==
On 9 September 2013, Chief Minister Giles announced that he would be "refreshing" his cabinet. Alison Anderson was removed from the ministry and her portfolios assigned to others. Bess Price joined the ministry. The new ministry was sworn in by the Administrator of the Northern Territory the next day.

| Minister | Office |
|---|---|
| Hon Adam Giles, MLA | Chief Minister; Minister for Northern Australia Development; Minister for Economic Development and Major Projects; Minister for Asian Engagement and Trade; Minister for Police, Fire and Emergency Services; Minister for Strategic Defence Liaison; Minister for Transport |
| Hon Dave Tollner, MLA | Deputy Chief Minister; Treasurer; Minister for Business; Minister for Employment and Training; Minister for Local Government and Regions; Minister for Defence Industries and Community Support; Minister for Alcohol Policy; Minister for Corporate Information Services |
| Hon John Elferink, MLA | Attorney-General and Minister for Justice; Minister for Public Employment; Minister for Children and Families; Minister for Correctional Services |
| Hon Robyn Lambley, MLA | Minister for Health; Minister for Alcohol Rehabilitation |
| Hon Peter Chandler, MLA | Minister for Education; Minister for Lands, Planning and the Environment |
| Hon Willem Westra van Holthe, MLA | Minister for Primary Industry and Fisheries; Minister for Mines and Energy; Minister for Land Resource Management; Minister for Essential Services |
| Hon Matt Conlan, MLA | Minister for Central Australia; Minister for Housing; Minister for Tourism; Minister for Sport, Recreation and Racing; Minister for Arts and Museums |
| Hon Peter Styles, MLA | Minister for Infrastructure; Minister for Multicultural Affairs; Minister for Senior Territorians; Minister for Young Territorians |
| Hon Bess Price, MLA | Minister for Community Services; Minister for Women's Policy; Minister for Parks and Wildlife; Minister for Statehood |

== Fifth ministry (16 September 2013 – 23 August 2014) ==
| Minister | Office |
|---|---|
| Hon Adam Giles, MLA | Chief Minister; Minister for Northern Australia Development; Minister for Economic Development and Major Projects; Minister for Asian Engagement and Trade; Minister for Police, Fire and Emergency Services; Minister for Strategic Defence Liaison |
| Hon Dave Tollner, MLA | Deputy Chief Minister; Treasurer; Minister for Business; Minister for Employment and Training; Minister for Local Government and Regions; Minister for Defence Industries and Community Support; Minister for Alcohol Policy; Minister for Corporate Information Services |
| Hon John Elferink, MLA | Attorney-General and Minister for Justice; Minister for Public Employment; Minister for Children and Families; Minister for Correctional Services |
| Hon Robyn Lambley, MLA | Minister for Health; Minister for Alcohol Rehabilitation; Minister for Disability Services (from 4 February 2014) |
| Hon Peter Chandler, MLA | Minister for Education; Minister for Lands, Planning and the Environment |
| Hon Willem Westra van Holthe, MLA | Minister for Primary Industry and Fisheries; Minister for Mines and Energy; Minister for Land Resource Management; Minister for Essential Services |
| Hon Matt Conlan, MLA | Minister for Central Australia; Minister for Housing; Minister for Tourism; Minister for Sport, Recreation and Racing; Minister for Arts and Museums |
| Hon Peter Styles, MLA | Minister for Transport; Minister for Infrastructure; Minister for Multicultural Affairs; Minister for Senior Territorians; Minister for Young Territorians |
| Hon Bess Price, MLA | Minister for Community Services; Minister for Women's Policy; Minister for Parks and Wildlife; Minister for Statehood |

== Sixth ministry (24 August 2014 – 11 December 2014) ==
| Minister | Office |
|---|---|
| Hon Adam Giles, MLA | Chief Minister; Minister for Northern Australia Development; Minister for Economic Development and Major Projects; Minister for Asian Engagement and Trade; Minister for Police, Fire and Emergency Services; Minister for Strategic Defence Liaison; Treasurer; Minister for Business; Minister for Employment and Training; Minister for Local Government and Regions; Minister for Defence Industries and Community Support; Minister for Alcohol Policy; Minister for Corporate Information Services |
| Hon Peter Chandler, MLA | Deputy Chief Minister; Minister for Education; Minister for Lands, Planning and the Environment |
| Hon John Elferink, MLA | Attorney-General and Minister for Justice; Minister for Public Employment; Minister for Children and Families; Minister for Correctional Services |
| Hon Robyn Lambley, MLA | Minister for Health; Minister for Alcohol Rehabilitation; Minister for Disability Services |
| Hon Willem Westra van Holthe, MLA | Minister for Primary Industry and Fisheries; Minister for Mines and Energy; Minister for Land Resource Management; Minister for Essential Services |
| Hon Matt Conlan, MLA | Minister for Central Australia; Minister for Housing; Minister for Tourism; Minister for Sport, Recreation and Racing; Minister for Arts and Museums |
| Hon Peter Styles, MLA | Minister for Transport; Minister for Infrastructure; Minister for Multicultural Affairs; Minister for Senior Territorians; Minister for Young Territorians |
| Hon Bess Price, MLA | Minister for Community Services; Minister for Women's Policy; Minister for Parks and Wildlife; Minister for Statehood |

== Seventh ministry (12 December 2014 – 19 January 2015) ==
| Minister | Office |
|---|---|
| Hon Adam Giles, MLA | Chief Minister; Minister for Northern Australia Development; Minister for Central Australian Development; Minister for Economic Development and Major Projects; Minister for Asian Engagement and Trade; Treasurer; Minister for Tourism; Minister for Arts and Museums; Minister for Health; Minister for Mental Health Services; Minister for Disability Services |
| Hon Peter Chandler, MLA | Deputy Chief Minister; Minister for Lands and Planning; Minister for Police, Fire and Emergency Services; Minister for Defence Industries and Veterans Support |
| Hon John Elferink, MLA | Attorney-General and Minister for Justice; Minister for Public Employment; Minister for Children and Families |
| Hon Willem Westra van Holthe, MLA | Minister for Primary Industry and Fisheries; Minister for Mines and Energy; Minister for Land Resource Management; Minister for Essential Services |
| Hon Peter Styles, MLA | Minister for Business; Minister for Racing, Gaming and Licensing; Minister for Multicultural Affairs; Minister for Corporate Information Services; Minister for Young Territorians |
| Hon Bess Price, MLA | Minister for Local Government and Community Services; Minister for Women's Policy; Minister for Men's Policy; Minister for Parks and Wildlife; Minister for Statehood |
| Hon Robyn Lambley, MLA | Minister for Education; Minister for Employment and Training; Minister for Corrections |
| Hon Matt Conlan, MLA | Minister for Transport; Minister for Infrastructure; Minister for Housing |
| Hon Gary Higgins, MLA | Minister for Sport and Recreation; Minister for Senior Territorians; Minister for the Environment; Minister assisting the Minister for Arts and Museums |

== Eighth ministry (20 January 2015 – 3 February 2015) ==
| Minister | Office |
|---|---|
| Hon Adam Giles, MLA | Chief Minister; Minister for Northern Australia Development; Minister for Central Australian Development; Minister for Economic Development and Major Projects; Minister for Asian Engagement and Trade; Treasurer; Minister for Tourism; Minister for Arts and Museums |
| Hon Peter Chandler, MLA | Deputy Chief Minister; Minister for Lands and Planning; Minister for Police, Fire and Emergency Services; Minister for Defence Industries and Veterans Support |
| Hon John Elferink, MLA | Attorney-General and Minister for Justice; Minister for Public Employment; Minister for Children and Families; Minister for Health; Minister for Mental Health Services; Minister for Disability Services |
| Hon Willem Westra van Holthe, MLA | Minister for Primary Industry and Fisheries; Minister for Mines and Energy; Minister for Land Resource Management; Minister for Essential Services |
| Hon Peter Styles, MLA | Minister for Business; Minister for Racing, Gaming and Licensing; Minister for Multicultural Affairs; Minister for Corporate Information Services; Minister for Young Territorians |
| Hon Robyn Lambley, MLA | Minister for Education; Minister for Employment and Training; Minister for Corrections |
| Hon Bess Price, MLA | Minister for Local Government and Community Services; Minister for Women's Policy; Minister for Men's Policy; Minister for Parks and Wildlife; Minister for Statehood |
| Hon Matt Conlan, MLA | Minister for Transport; Minister for Infrastructure; Minister for Housing |
| Hon Gary Higgins, MLA | Minister for Sport and Recreation; Minister for Senior Territorians; Minister for the Environment; Minister assisting Minister for Arts and Museums |

== Ninth ministry (4 February 2015 – 10 February 2015) ==
On 2 February 2015, cabinet member Willem Westra van Holthe challenged Chief Minister Adam Giles for the leadership of the Country Liberal Party, and announced that the party had voted him as leader and chief minister apparent. The next day, Giles refused to resign as chief minister and after a meeting of the parliamentary wing of the CLP, emerged to announce that he was still the leader and that Westra van Holthe would be his deputy. On 4 February, Robyn Lambley was expelled from Cabinet for supporting the challenge.

| Minister | Office |
|---|---|
| Hon Adam Giles, MLA | Chief Minister; Minister for Northern Australia Development; Minister for Central Australian Development; Minister for Economic Development and Major Projects; Minister for Asian Engagement and Trade; Treasurer; Minister for Tourism; Minister for Arts and Museums |
| Hon Willem Westra van Holthe, MLA | Deputy Chief Minister; Minister for Primary Industry and Fisheries; Minister for Mines and Energy; Minister for Land Resource Management; Minister for Essential Services |
| Hon Peter Chandler, MLA | Minister for Lands and Planning; Minister for Police, Fire and Emergency Services; Minister for Defence Industries and Veterans Support |
| Hon John Elferink, MLA | Attorney-General and Minister for Justice; Minister for Public Employment; Minister for Children and Families; Minister for Health; Minister for Mental Health Services; Minister for Disability Services; Minister for Education; Minister for Employment and Training; Minister for Corrections |
| Hon Peter Styles, MLA | Minister for Business; Minister for Racing, Gaming and Licensing; Minister for Multicultural Affairs; Minister for Corporate Information Services; Minister for Young Territorians |
| Hon Bess Price, MLA | Minister for Local Government and Community Services; Minister for Women's Policy; Minister for Men's Policy; Minister for Parks and Wildlife; Minister for Statehood |
| Hon Matt Conlan, MLA | Minister for Transport; Minister for Infrastructure; Minister for Housing |
| Hon Gary Higgins, MLA | Minister for Sport and Recreation; Minister for Senior Territorians; Minister for the Environment; Minister assisting the Minister for Arts and Museums |

== Tenth ministry (11 February 2015 – 14 February 2016) ==
A further reshuffle was held following the resignation of Matt Conlan from Cabinet on 10 February.

| Minister | Office |
|---|---|
| Hon Adam Giles, MLA | Chief Minister; Minister for Tourism; Minister for Northern and Central Australia; Minister for Economic Development and Major Projects; Minister for Indigenous Affairs |
| Hon Willem Westra van Holthe, MLA | Deputy Chief Minister; Minister for Primary Industry and Fisheries; Minister for Land Resource Management; Minister for Essential Services; Minister for Public Employment |
| Hon Dave Tollner, MLA | Treasurer; Minister for Lands and Planning; Minister for Mines and Energy |
| Hon John Elferink, MLA | Attorney-General and Minister for Justice; Minister for Children and Families; Minister for Health; Minister for Disability Services; Minister for Mental Health Services; Minister for Correctional Services |
| Hon Peter Styles, MLA | Minister for Business; Minister for Racing, Gaming and Licensing; Minister for Asian Engagement and Trade; Minister for Employment and Training; Minister for Corporate Information Services; Minister for Multicultural Affairs; Minister for Young Territorians; Minister for Senior Territorians; Minister for Defence Industries |
| Hon Peter Chandler, MLA | Minister for Police, Fire and Emergency Services; Minister for Education; Minister for Transport; Minister for Infrastructure; Minister for Veterans Support |
| Hon Bess Price, MLA | Minister for Local Government and Community Services; Minister for Housing; Minister for Parks and Wildlife; Minister for Men's Policy; Minister for Women's Policy; Minister for Statehood |
| Hon Gary Higgins, MLA | Minister for Sport and Recreation; Minister for the Environment; Minister for Arts and Museums |

== Eleventh ministry (15 February 2016 – 18 July 2016) ==
| Minister | Office |
|---|---|
| Hon Adam Giles, MLA | Chief Minister; Minister for Police, Fire and Emergency Services; Minister for Tourism; Minister for Northern and Central Australia; Minister for Economic Development and Major Projects; Minister for Indigenous Affairs; Minister Assisting the Treasurer (from 11 June 2016); Minister for Sport and Recreation (from 11 June 2016); Minister for Young Territorians (from 11 June 2016) |
| Hon Peter Styles, MLA | Deputy Chief Minister; Minister for Business; Minister for Racing, Gaming and Licensing; Minister for Asian Engagement and Trade; Minister for Public Employment; Minister for Employment and Training; Minister for Corporate Information Services; Minister for Defence Industries; Minister for Multicultural Affairs; Minister for Senior Territorians |
| Hon Dave Tollner, MLA | Treasurer; Minister for Lands and Planning; Minister for Mines and Energy |
| Hon John Elferink, MLA | Attorney-General and Minister for Justice; Minister for Children and Families; Minister for Health; Minister for Disability Services; Minister for Mental Health Services; Minister for Correctional Services |
| Hon Peter Chandler, MLA | Minister for Education; Minister for Transport; Minister for Infrastructure; Minister for Essential Services; Minister for Veterans Support |
| Hon Gary Higgins, MLA | Minister for Primary Industry and Fisheries; Minister for Land Resource Management; Minister for the Environment; Minister for Arts and Museums |
| Hon Bess Price, MLA | Minister for Local Government and Community Services; Minister for Housing; Minister for Parks and Wildlife; Minister for Men's Policy; Minister for Women's Policy; Minister for Statehood |
| Hon Nathan Barrett, MLA (until 11 June 2016) | Minister Assisting the Treasurer; Minister for Sport and Recreation; Minister for Young Territorians |

== Twelfth ministry (19 July 2016 – 25 July 2016) ==
| Minister | Office |
|---|---|
| Hon Adam Giles, MLA | Chief Minister; Minister for Police, Fire and Emergency Services; Minister for Tourism; Minister for Northern and Central Australia; Minister for Economic Development and Major Projects; Minister for Indigenous Affairs |
| Hon Peter Styles, MLA | Deputy Chief Minister; Minister for Business; Minister for Racing, Gaming and Licensing; Minister for Asian Engagement and Trade; Minister for Employment and Training; Minister for Public Employment; Minister for Corporate Information Services; Minister for Multicultural Affairs; Minister for Defence Industries; Minister for Senior Territorians |
| Hon Dave Tollner, MLA | Treasurer; Minister for Lands and Planning; Minister for Mines and Energy |
| Hon John Elferink, MLA | Attorney-General and Minister for Justice; Minister for Children and Families; Minister for Health; Minister for Disability Services; Minister for Mental Health Services; Minister for Correctional Services |
| Hon Peter Chandler, MLA | Minister for Education; Minister for Transport; Minister for Infrastructure; Minister for Essential Services; Minister for Veterans Support |
| Hon Gary Higgins, MLA | Minister for Primary Industry and Fisheries; Minister for Land Resource Management; Minister for the Environment; Minister for Arts and Museums; Minister for Sport and Recreation (from 19 July 2016); Minister for Young Territorians (from 19 July 2016) |
| Hon Bess Price, MLA | Minister for Local Government and Community Services; Minister for Housing; Minister for Parks and Wildlife; Minister for Men's Policy; Minister for Women's Policy; Minister for Statehood |

== Thirteenth ministry (26 July 2016 – 27 August 2016) ==
John Elferink was sacked as Minister for Correctional Services on 26 July 2016, with Adam Giles assuming the portfolio.

| Minister | Office |
|---|---|
| Hon Adam Giles, MLA | Chief Minister; Minister for Police, Fire and Emergency Services; Minister for Tourism; Minister for Northern and Central Australia; Minister for Economic Development and Major Projects; Minister for Indigenous Affairs; Minister for Correctional Services |
| Hon Peter Styles, MLA | Deputy Chief Minister; Minister for Business; Minister for Racing, Gaming and Licensing; Minister for Asian Engagement and Trade; Minister for Employment and Training; Minister for Public Employment; Minister for Corporate Information Services; Minister for Multicultural Affairs; Minister for Defence Industries; Minister for Senior Territorians |
| Hon Dave Tollner, MLA | Treasurer; Minister for Lands and Planning; Minister for Mines and Energy |
| Hon John Elferink, MLA | Attorney-General and Minister for Justice; Minister for Children and Families; Minister for Health; Minister for Disability Services; Minister for Mental Health Services |
| Hon Peter Chandler, MLA | Minister for Education; Minister for Transport; Minister for Infrastructure; Minister for Essential Services; Minister for Veterans Support |
| Hon Gary Higgins, MLA | Minister for Primary Industry and Fisheries; Minister for Land Resource Management; Minister for the Environment; Minister for Arts and Museums; Minister for Sport and Recreation; Minister for Young Territorians |
| Hon Bess Price, MLA | Minister for Local Government and Community Services; Minister for Housing; Minister for Parks and Wildlife; Minister for Men's Policy; Minister for Women's Policy; Minister for Statehood |
