= Burke ministry (Northern Territory) =

The Burke Ministry was the ministry of the sixth Chief Minister of the Northern Territory, Denis Burke. It was sworn in on 9 February 1999, following the resignation of former Chief Minister Shane Stone the previous day. While Stone told the media that his resignation was "pretty much" of his own timing and he wished to give the new CLP leader sufficient time to prepare for the 2001 election, it followed a meeting of backbenchers and some cabinet ministers advocating his removal. Burke was elected unopposed as leader. It was in office until 26 August 2001, when the Burke government lost the 2001 election to Clare Martin's Labor Party.

== First ministry (9 February 1999 – 3 August 1999) ==
The new ministry saw a few main changes apart from the leadership, with Eric Poole leaving the Ministry and Stephen Dunham and Loraine Braham being added, while Tim Baldwin was promoted. It operated until 3 August 1999, when Chris Lugg was promoted to the Ministry to replace Barry Coulter, who had retired on 18 June 1999.

Minister	Office
Hon Denis Burke, MLA	Chief Minister; Attorney-General; Minister for Young Territorians; Minister for Women's Policy; Minister for Constitutional Development; Minister for Transport and Infrastructure Development (from 21 June 1999)^{[1]}; Minister for Territory Ports (from 21 June 1999); Minister for the AustralAsia Railway (from 21 June 1999)
Hon Mike Reed, MLA	Deputy Chief Minister; Treasurer; Minister for Tourism; Minister for Police, Fire and Emergency Services; Minister for Parks and Wildlife; Minister for Territory Insurance Office; Minister for Essential Services (from 21 June 1999)^{[1]}
Hon Barry Coulter, MLA (until 18 June 1999)^{[1]}	Leader of Government Business; Minister for Transport and Infrastructure Development; Minister for Territory Ports; Minister for the AustralAsia Railway; Minister for Essential Services
Hon Tim Baldwin, MLA	Minister for Industries and Business; Minister for Racing, Gaming and Licensing; Minister for Defence Support and Regional Development; Minister for Lands, Planning and Environment
Hon Daryl Manzie, MLA	Minister for Asian Relations and Trade; Minister for Resource Development; Minister for Corporate and Information Services; Minister for Public Employment and Industrial Relations; Minister for Communications, Science and Advanced Technology
Hon Peter Adamson, MLA	Minister for School Education; Minister for Sport and Recreation; Minister for Tertiary Education and Training; Minister for Arts and Museums
Hon Stephen Dunham, MLA	Minister for Health, Family and Children's Services; Minister for Senior Territorians
Hon Loraine Braham, MLA	Minister for Local Government; Minister for Housing; Minister for Aboriginal Development; Minister for Central Australia
Hon Mick Palmer, MLA	Minister for Primary Industry and Fisheries; Minister for Ethnic Affairs; Minister for Correctional Services; Leader of Government Business (from 19 June 1999) ^{[1]}

^{1} On 18 June 1999, Barry Coulter retired from politics and resigned from the Ministry. On 21 June 1999, the Chief Minister and Deputy Chief Minister divided his portfolios.

- Carment, David (December 1999). "Australian Political Chronicle: January-June 1999". Australian Journal of Politics and History. 45 (4): 606–608. ISSN 0004-9522. (under "A New Chief Minister")

== Second ministry (4 August 1999 – 30 January 2000) ==
The Second Burke Ministry was the 40th ministry to come from the Northern Territory Legislative Assembly. It was sworn in on 4 August 1999, following the promotion of Chris Lugg to the Ministry to replace Barry Coulter who had resigned from Parliament. It operated until 30 January 2000.

Minister	Office
Hon Denis Burke, MLA	Chief Minister; Attorney-General; Minister for the AustralAsia Railway; Minister for Young Territorians; Minister for Women's Policy; Minister for Constitutional Development
Hon Mike Reed, MLA	Deputy Chief Minister; Treasurer; Minister for Tourism; Minister for Police, Fire and Emergency Services; Minister for Parks and Wildlife; Minister for Territory Insurance
Hon Tim Baldwin, MLA	Minister for Industries and Business; Minister for Racing, Gaming and Licensing; Minister for Defence Support and Regional Development; Minister for Lands, Planning and Environment
Hon Daryl Manzie, MLA	Minister for Asian Relations and Trade; Minister for Resource Development; Minister for Public Employment and Industrial Relations
Hon Mick Palmer, MLA	Leader of Government Business; Minister for Primary Industry and Fisheries; Minister for Transport and Infrastructure Development; Minister for Territory Ports
Hon Stephen Dunham, MLA	Minister for Health, Family and Children's Services; Minister for Senior Territorians; Minister for Essential Services
Hon Peter Adamson, MLA	Minister for School Education; Minister for Tertiary Education and Training; Minister for Corporate and Information Services; Minister for Communications, Science and Advanced Technology; Minister for Ethnic Affairs
Hon Loraine Braham, MLA	Minister for Local Government; Minister for Housing; Minister for Aboriginal Development; Minister for Central Australia
Hon Chris Lugg, MLA	Minister for Sport and Recreation; Minister for Correctional Services; Minister for Arts and Museums

== Third ministry (31 January 2000 – 26 August 2001) ==
The Third Burke Ministry was the 41st ministry to come from the Northern Territory Legislative Assembly. It was sworn in on 30 January 2000, and operated until 26 August 2001, and was succeeded by the First Martin Ministry after the Labor Party's victory in the 2001 election.

Minister	Office
Hon Denis Burke, MLA	Chief Minister; Attorney-General; Minister for the AustralAsia Railway; Minister for Young Territorians; Minister for Women's Policy; Minister for Constitutional Development
Hon Mike Reed, MLA	Deputy Chief Minister; Treasurer; Minister for Tourism; Minister for Police, Fire and Emergency Services; Minister for Parks and Wildlife; Minister for Public Employment and Industrial Relations
Hon Tim Baldwin, MLA	Minister for Industries and Business; Minister for Racing, Gaming and Licensing; Minister for Defence Support and Regional Development; Minister for Lands, Planning and Environment
Hon Daryl Manzie, MLA	Minister for Asian Relations and Trade; Minister for Resource Development; Minister for Correctional Services; Minister for Territory Insurance
Hon Mick Palmer, MLA	Leader of Government Business; Minister for Primary Industry and Fisheries; Minister for Transport and Infrastructure Development; Minister for Territory Ports
Hon Stephen Dunham, MLA	Minister for Health, Family and Children's Services; Minister for Senior Territorians; Minister for Essential Services
Hon Chris Lugg, MLA	Minister for School Education; Minister for Tertiary Education and Training; Minister for Sport and Recreation
Hon Peter Adamson, MLA	Minister for Corporate and Information Services; Minister for Communications, Science and Advanced Technology; Minister for Ethnic Affairs; Minister for Arts and Museums; Minister for Aboriginal Development (from 27 November 2000)^{[1]}
Hon Loraine Braham, MLA (until 26 November 2000)^{[1]}	Minister for Local Government; Minister for Housing; Minister for Aboriginal Development; Minister for Central Australia
Hon Dr Richard Lim, MLA (from 27 November 2000)^{[1]}	Minister for Housing; Minister for Central Australia; Minister for Local Government

^{1} On 25 November 2000, in what was described as a completely unexpected move, the Country Liberal Party denied sitting member Loraine Braham preselection for her Braitling seat. Braham, who was "utterly stunned" by the decision, was replaced immediately as a minister with Dr Richard Lim.

- Carment, David (June 2001). "Australian Political Chronicle: July-December 2000". Australian Journal of Politics and History. 47 (2): 306. ISSN 0004-9522. (under "Arrivals and Departures")
