= Martin ministry =

The Martin ministry was the ministry of the seventh Chief Minister of the Northern Territory, Clare Martin. It was sworn in on 27 August 2001 after Martin's victory 2001 election. In addition to Martin as the first ever female Chief Minister, it also included the first ever indigenous minister in Jack Ah Kit. Martin served until November 2007, when she was succeeded by her deputy, Paul Henderson.

== First ministry (27 August 2001 – 12 November 2001) ==
The first ministry lasted until 12 November 2001, when Martin made some portfolio changes and installed a more permanent ministry.

| Minister | Office |
|---|---|
| Hon Clare Martin, MLA | Chief Minister; Treasurer; Minister for Arts and Museums; Minister for Young Territorians; Minister for Women's Policy; Minister for Senior Territorians; Minister for Communications, Science and Advanced Technology |
| Hon Syd Stirling, MLA | Deputy Chief Minister; Leader of Government Business; Minister for Employment, Education and Training; Minister for Police, Fire and Emergency Services; Minister for Parks and Wildlife; Minister for Aboriginal Affairs; Minister for Tourism |
| Hon Dr Peter Toyne, MLA | Attorney-General; Minister for Central Australia; Minister for Primary Industry and Fisheries; Minister for Sport and Recreation; Minister for Corporate and Information Services; Minister for Regional Development |
| Hon Paul Henderson, MLA | Minister for Industries and Business; Minister for Resource Development; Minister for Asian Relations and Trade; Minister for Territory Insurance; Minister for the AustralAsia Railway; Minister for Racing, Gaming and Licensing; Minister for Defence Support (from 3 October 2001) |
| Hon Jack Ah Kit, MLA | Minister for Transport and Infrastructure Development; Minister for Territory Ports; Minister for Correctional Services; Minister for Essential Services |
| Hon Jane Aagaard, MLA | Minister for Health, Family and Children's Services; Minister Assisting the Chief Minister on Women's Policy |
| Hon Kon Vatskalis, MLA | Minister for Lands, Planning and Environment; Minister for Housing; Minister for Local Government; Minister for Ethnic Affairs |

== Second ministry (13 November 2001 – 17 October 2002) ==
The second ministry came into existence on 13 November 2001, when Martin replaced the interim ministry that had been installed after she won office three months before. This involved reshuffling several portfolios and eliminating some more minor ones altogether. It lasted until 17 October 2002, when an eighth minister, Dr Chris Burns, was promoted in order to reduce the workload of the seven existing ministers.

| Minister | Office |
|---|---|
| Hon Clare Martin, MLA | Chief Minister; Treasurer; Minister for Territory Development; Minister for Indigenous Affairs; Minister for Arts and Museums; Minister for Young Territorians; Minister for Women's Policy; Minister for Senior Territorians |
| Hon Syd Stirling, MLA | Deputy Chief Minister; Leader of Government Business; Minister for Employment, Education and Training; Minister for Police, Fire and Emergency Services; Minister for Racing, Gaming and Licensing |
| Hon Dr Peter Toyne, MLA | Minister for Justice and Attorney-General; Minister for Corporate and Information Services; Minister for Communications; Minister for Central Australia |
| Hon Paul Henderson, MLA | Minister for Business, Industry and Resource Development; Minister for Primary Industry and Fisheries; Minister for Energy; Minister for Asian Relations and Trade; Minister for the AustralAsia Railway; Minister for Tourism; Minister for Defence Support; Minister Assisting the Chief Minister on Territory Development |
| Hon Jack Ah Kit, MLA | Minister for Community Development; Minister for Housing; Minister for Local Government; Minister for Sport and Recreation; Minister for Regional Development; Minister Assisting the Chief Minister on Indigenous Affairs |
| Hon Jane Aagaard, MLA | Minister for Health and Community Services; Minister Assisting the Chief Minister on Women's Policy |
| Hon Kon Vatskalis, MLA | Minister for Transport and Infrastructure; Minister for Lands and Planning; Minister for the Environment; Minister for Ethnic Affairs; Minister for Essential Services; Minister for Parks and Wildlife |

== Third ministry (18 October 2002 – 14 December 2003) ==
The third Martin ministry came into existence on 18 October 2002, when an eighth minister, Dr Chris Burns was promoted in order to reduce the workload of the seven existing ministers. It lasted until 14 December 2003, when Chief Minister Clare Martin sacked underperforming Health Minister Jane Aagaard and demoted Kon Vatskalis.

| Minister | Office |
|---|---|
| Hon Clare Martin, MLA | Chief Minister; Minister for Territory Development; Minister for the AustralAsia Railway; Minister for Indigenous Affairs; Minister for Arts and Museums; Minister for Young Territorians; Minister for Women's Policy; Minister for Senior Territorians |
| Hon Syd Stirling, MLA | Deputy Chief Minister; Treasurer; Minister for Employment, Education and Training; Minister for Racing, Gaming and Licensing |
| Hon Dr Peter Toyne, MLA | Minister for Justice and Attorney-General; Minister for Corporate and Information Services; Minister for Communications; Minister for Central Australia |
| Hon Paul Henderson, MLA | Leader of Government Business; Minister for Business, Industry and Resource Development; Minister for Asian Relations and Trade; Minister for Police, Fire and Emergency Services; Minister for Defence Support |
| Hon Jack Ah Kit, MLA | Minister for Community Development; Minister for Housing; Minister for Local Government; Minister for Sport and Recreation; Minister for Regional Development; Minister Assisting the Chief Minister on Indigenous Affairs |
| Hon Jane Aagaard, MLA | Minister for Health and Community Services |
| Hon Kon Vatskalis, MLA | Minister for Transport and Infrastructure; Minister for Lands and Planning; Minister for Ethnic Affairs; Minister for Parks and Wildlife |
| Hon Dr Chris Burns, MLA | Minister for Tourism; Minister for Primary Industry and Fisheries; Minister for the Environment and Heritage; Minister for Essential Services |

- Carment, David (June 2004). "Australian Political Chronicle: July–December 2003". Australian Journal of Politics and History. 50 (2): 307. doi:10.1111/j.1467-8497.2004.247_8.x. ISSN 0004-9522. (under "A Cabinet Reshuffle")

== Fourth ministry (15 December 2003 – 23 June 2005) ==
The fourth Martin ministry came into existence on 15 December 2003 after a major ministerial reshuffle that attempted to deal with two ministers that were widely seen as underperforming. The reshuffle saw Minister for Health and Community Services Jane Aagaard dropped from the ministry entirely and Minister for Transport and Infrastructure, Lands and Planning, Ethnic Affairs and Parks and Wildlife Kon Vatskalis severely demoted. Marion Scrymgour was promoted to fill the vacancy created by Aagaard's dumping, becoming the first ever female Aboriginal minister in Australia.

The ministry operated until 23 June 2005, when Martin, having won the 2005 election, appointed an interim ministry to guide the budget through estimates committees before announcing an expanded ministry the following month. This had been made necessary by the retirement of Jack Ah Kit, the Minister for Community Development, Minister for Housing, Minister for Local Government, Minister for Sport and Recreation, Minister for Regional Development, and Minister assisting the Chief Minister on Indigenous Affairs, at the election.

| Minister | Office |
|---|---|
| Hon Clare Martin, MLA | Chief Minister; Minister for Tourism; Minister for Territory Development; Minister for the AustralAsia Railway; Minister for Indigenous Affairs; Minister for Arts and Museums; Minister for Young Territorians; Minister for Women's Policy; Minister for Senior Territorians |
| Hon Syd Stirling, MLA | Deputy Chief Minister; Treasurer; Minister for Employment, Education and Training; Minister for Racing, Gaming and Licensing |
| Hon Dr Peter Toyne, MLA | Minister for Justice and Attorney-General; Minister for Health; Minister for Central Australia |
| Hon Paul Henderson, MLA | Leader of Government Business; Minister for Business and Industry; Minister for Police, Fire and Emergency Services; Minister for Defence Support; Minister for Asian Relations and Trade; Minister for Corporate and Information Services; Minister for Communications |
| Hon Jack Ah Kit, MLA | Minister for Community Development; Minister for Housing; Minister for Local Government; Minister for Sport and Recreation; Minister for Regional Development; Minister Assisting the Chief Minister on Indigenous Affairs |
| Hon Dr Chris Burns, MLA | Minister for Transport and Infrastructure; Minister for Lands and Planning; Minister for Parks and Wildlife; Minister for Essential Services |
| Hon Kon Vatskalis, MLA | Minister for Mines and Energy; Minister for Primary Industry and Fisheries; Minister for Ethnic Affairs (until 9 December 2004); Minister for Multicultural Affairs (from 9 December 2004) |
| Hon Marion Scrymgour, MLA | Minister for Family and Community Services; Minister for the Environment and Heritage; Minister Assisting the Chief Minister on Young Territorians, Women's Policy and Senior Territorians |

- Carment, David (June 2004). "Australian Political Chronicle: July-December 2003". Australian Journal of Politics and History. 50 (2): 307. doi:10.1111/j.1467-8497.2004.247_8.x. ISSN 0004-9522. (under "A Cabinet Reshuffle")
- Carment, David (December 2005). "Australian Political Chronicle: January-June 2005". Australian Journal of Politics and History. 51 (4): 622. ISSN 0004-9522. (under "Election Aftermath")

== Fifth ministry (24 June 2005 – 10 July 2005) ==
The fifth Martin ministry served as an interim ministry after the Labor Party's victory in the 2005 election. It was made necessary as the experienced Jack Ah Kit had retired at the election, and Chief Minister Martin was reluctant to force new and inexperienced ministers to have to carry the budget through estimates committees in their first weeks on the job. As a result, Ah Kit's entire workload passed to the already heavily loaded Paul Henderson for a little over two weeks from 24 June 2005 until 11 July 2005, when the full ministry was sworn in.

| Minister | Office |
|---|---|
| Hon Clare Martin, MLA | Chief Minister; Minister for Tourism; Minister for Territory Development; Minister for the AustralAsia Railway; Minister for Indigenous Affairs; Minister for Arts and Museums; Minister for Young Territorians; Minister for Women's Policy; Minister for Senior Territorians |
| Hon Syd Stirling, MLA | Deputy Chief Minister; Treasurer; Minister for Employment, Education and Training; Minister for Racing, Gaming and Licensing |
| Hon Dr Peter Toyne, MLA | Minister for Justice and Attorney-General; Minister for Health; Minister for Central Australia |
| Hon Paul Henderson, MLA | Leader of Government Business; Minister for Business and Industry; Minister for Police, Fire and Emergency Services; Minister for Defence Support; Minister for Asian Relations and Trade; Minister for Corporate and Information Services; Minister for Communications; Minister for Community Development; Minister for Housing; Minister for Local Government; Minister for Sport and Recreation; Minister for Regional Development; Minister Assisting the Chief Minister on Indigenous Affairs |
| Hon Dr Chris Burns, MLA | Minister for Transport and Infrastructure; Minister for Lands and Planning; Minister for Parks and Wildlife; Minister for Essential Services |
| Hon Kon Vatskalis, MLA | Minister for Mines and Energy; Minister for Primary Industry and Fisheries; Minister for Multicultural Affairs |
| Hon Marion Scrymgour, MLA | Minister for Family and Community Services; Minister for the Environment and Heritage; Minister Assisting the Chief Minister on Young Territorians, Women's Policy and Senior Territorians |

- Carment, David (December 2005). "Australian Political Chronicle: January-June 2005". Australian Journal of Politics and History. 51 (4): 622. ISSN 0004-9522. (under "Election Aftermath")
- Carment, David (June 2006). "Australian Political Chronicle: January-June 2005". Australian Journal of Politics and History. 52 (2): 327–328. ISSN 0004-9522. (under "The New Ministry")

== Sixth ministry (11 July 2005 – 31 August 2006) ==
The sixth Martin ministry came into existence on 12 July 2005, when the recently re-elected Chief Minister Martin replaced the temporary ministry that had been appointed after her victory in the 2005 election. The new ministry saw the promotion of two MLAs to the ministry: Delia Lawrie (Karama) and Elliot McAdam (Barkly), increasing the total number of ministers to nine. While this broke a 2001 election promise to keep the number of ministers to seven, it was largely uncontroversial due to the widely held perception that the cut had left ministers overstretched. The ministry operated until 30 August 2006, when a reshuffle was held to replace the retired Dr Peter Toyne.

| Minister | Office |
|---|---|
| Hon Clare Martin, MLA | Chief Minister; Minister for Tourism; Minister for Asian Relations and Trade; Minister for the AustralAsia Railway; Minister for Indigenous Affairs |
| Hon Syd Stirling, MLA | Deputy Chief Minister; Treasurer; Minister for Employment, Education and Training; Minister for Racing, Gaming and Licensing |
| Hon Dr Peter Toyne, MLA | Minister for Justice and Attorney-General; Minister for Health; Minister for Central Australia |
| Hon Paul Henderson, MLA | Leader of Government Business; Minister for Business and Economic Development; Minister for Police, Fire and Emergency Services; Minister for Regional Development; Minister for Defence Support; Minister for Essential Services |
| Hon Dr Chris Burns, MLA | Minister for Planning and Lands; Minister for Transport and Infrastructure; Minister for Public Employment; Minister for Corporate and Information Services; Minister for Communications |
| Hon Kon Vatskalis, MLA | Minister for Primary Industry and Fisheries; Minister for Mines and Energy; Minister for Multicultural Affairs |
| Hon Marion Scrymgour, MLA | Minister for Natural Resources, Environment and Heritage; Minister for Parks and Wildlife; Minister for Arts and Museums; Minister for Young Territorians; Minister for Women's Policy; Minister for Senior Territorians |
| Hon Elliot McAdam, MLA | Minister for Local Government; Minister for Housing; Minister Assisting the Chief Minister on Indigenous Affairs |
| Hon Delia Lawrie, MLA | Minister for Family and Community Services; Minister for Sport and Recreation |

== Seventh ministry (1 September 2006 – 6 August 2007) ==
The seventh Martin ministry came into existence on 1 September 2006 as a result of a major reshuffle sparked by the sudden mid-term retirement of Attorney-General Dr Peter Toyne. The introduction of the new ministry saw first-term MLA Chris Natt replace Toyne in the ministry amidst a major reshuffle of the entire ministry, with a number of key portfolios being shifted. It lasted until 7 August 2007, when Martin reshuffled the ministry in response to the fallout from the federal government's Northern Territory National Emergency Response.

| Minister | Office |
|---|---|
| Hon Clare Martin, MLA | Chief Minister; Minister for Asian Relations and Trade; Minister for the AustralAsia Railway; Minister for Indigenous Policy; Minister for Major Projects |
| Hon Syd Stirling, MLA | Deputy Chief Minister; Treasurer; Minister for Justice and Attorney-General; Minister for Statehood |
| Hon Paul Henderson, MLA | Leader of Government Business; Minister for Employment, Education and Training; Minister for Tourism; Minister for Public Employment |
| Hon Dr Chris Burns, MLA | Minister for Health; Minister for Police, Fire and Emergency Services; Minister for Racing, Gaming and Licensing |
| Hon Kon Vatskalis, MLA | Minister for Business and Economic Development; Minister for Regional Development; Minister for Defence Support; Minister for Sport and Recreation; Minister for Essential Services |
| Hon Delia Lawrie, MLA | Minister for Planning and Lands; Minister for Infrastructure and Transport; Minister for Family and Community Services; Minister for Multicultural Affairs |
| Hon Marion Scrymgour, MLA | Minister for Natural Resources, Environment and Heritage; Minister for Parks and Wildlife; Minister for Arts and Museums; Minister for Young Territorians; Minister for Women's Policy; Minister for Senior Territorians |
| Hon Elliot McAdam, MLA | Minister for Local Government; Minister for Housing; Minister for Central Australia; Minister for Corporate and Information Services; Minister for Communications; Minister Assisting the Chief Minister on Indigenous Policy |
| Hon Chris Natt, MLA | Minister for Primary Industry and Fisheries; Minister for Mines and Energy |

== Eighth ministry (7 August 2007 to 25 November 2007) ==
The eighth Martin ministry came into existence on 7 August 2007 after a reshuffle sparked by the repercussions from the federal government's Northern Territory National Emergency Response. This resulted in a number of changes, including the taking on of the difficult police portfolio by then-Chief Minister Clare Martin, the return of the family and community services portfolio to indigenous MLA Marion Scrymgour and the creation of a separate alcohol policy portfolio for Health Minister Chris Burns. It lasted until 25 November 2007, when Paul Henderson was sworn in as Chief Minister in the wake of the sudden resignations of Martin and her deputy, Syd Stirling.

| Minister | Office |
|---|---|
| Hon Clare Martin, MLA | Chief Minister; Minister for Police, Fire and Emergency Services; Minister for Asian Relations and Trade; Minister for the AustralAsia Railway; Minister for Indigenous Policy; Minister for Major Projects |
| Hon Syd Stirling, MLA | Deputy Chief Minister; Treasurer; Minister for Justice and Attorney-General; Minister for Statehood |
| Hon Paul Henderson, MLA | Leader of Government Business; Minister for Employment, Education and Training; Minister for Tourism; Minister for Public Employment; Minister for Multicultural Affairs |
| Hon Dr Chris Burns, MLA | Minister for Health; Minister for Racing, Gaming and Licensing; Minister for Alcohol Policy |
| Hon Kon Vatskalis, MLA | Minister for Business and Economic Development; Minister for Regional Development; Minister for Defence Support; Minister for Sport and Recreation; Minister for Essential Services |
| Hon Delia Lawrie, MLA | Minister for Planning and Lands; Minister for Infrastructure and Transport; Minister for Natural Resources, Environment and Heritage; Minister for Parks and Wildlife |
| Hon Marion Scrymgour, MLA | Minister for Family and Community Services; Minister for Child Protection; Minister for Arts and Museums; Minister for Women's Policy; Minister for Senior Territorians; Minister for Young Territorians |
| Hon Elliot McAdam, MLA | Minister for Local Government; Minister for Housing; Minister for Central Australia; Minister for Corporate and Information Services; Minister for Communications; Minister Assisting the Chief Minister on Indigenous Policy |
| Hon Chris Natt, MLA | Minister for Primary Industry and Fisheries; Minister for Mines and Energy |
