= Minister for Public Service =

Minister for Public Employment
- Incumbent; Gerry McCarthy since 12 September 2016
- Office of the Commissioner for Public Employment
- Style: The Honourable
- Appointer: Administrator of the Northern Territory

The Northern Territory Minister for Public Employment is a Minister of the Crown in the Government of the Northern Territory. The minister administers their portfolio through the Office of the Commissioner for Public Employment.

The Minister is responsible for the development and coordination of public and private employment strategies, industrial relations and the public sector.

The current minister is Paul Kirby (Labor). He was sworn in on 8 September 2020 following the Labor victory at the 2020 election.

== List of ministers for public employment ==
Minister	Party	Term	Ministerial title
Shane Stone	Country Liberal	13 November 1990 – 29 November 1992	Minister for Public Employment
Fred Finch	Country Liberal	30 November 1992 – 14 June 1994	Minister for Public Employment
Eric Poole	Country Liberal	18 July 1994 – 30 June 1995	Minister for Public Employment
Fred Finch	Country Liberal	1 July 1995 – 1 July 1997	Minister for Public Employment
Shane Stone	Country Liberal	2 July 1997 – 14 September 1997	Minister for Public Employment
Mike Reed	Country Liberal	15 September 1997 – 8 February 1999	Minister for Public Employment
Daryl Manzie	Country Liberal	9 February 1999 – 30 January 2000	Minister for Public Employment and Industrial Relations
Mike Reed	Country Liberal	31 January 2000 – 26 August 2001	Minister for Public Employment and Industrial Relations
27 August 2001 – 10 July 2005: no minister – responsibilities held by other ministers
Chris Burns	Labor	11 July 2005 – 31 August 2006	Minister for Public Employment
Paul Henderson	Labor	1 September 2006 – 29 November 2007	Minister for Public Employment
Delia Lawrie	Labor	30 November 2007 – 17 August 2008	Minister for Public Employment
Rob Knight	Labor	18 August 2008 – 3 December 2009	Minister for Public Employment
Chris Burns	Labor	4 December 2009 – 28 August 2012	Minister for Public Employment
Terry Mills	Country Liberal	29 August 2012 – 1 October 2012	Minister for Public Employment
Robyn Lambley	Country Liberal	14 December 2012 – 6 March 2013	Minister for Public Employment
Willem Westra van Holthe	Country Liberal	7 March 2013 – 13 March 2013	Minister for Public Employment
Adam Giles	Country Liberal	14 March 2013 – 19 March 2013	Minister for Public Employment
John Elferink	Country Liberal	20 March 2013 – 10 February 2015	Minister for Public Employment
Willem Westra van Holthe	Country Liberal	11 February 2015 – 14 February 2016	Minister for Public Employment
Peter Styles	Country Liberal	15 February 2016 – 27 August 2016	Minister for Public Employment
Michael Gunner	Labor	31 August 2016 – 11 September 2016	Minister for Public Employment
Gerry McCarthy	Labor	12 September 2016 – 7 September 2020	Minister for Public Employment
Paul Kirby	Labor	8 September 2020 – present	Minister for Public Employment

== Former posts ==
=== Employment ===
Minister	Party	Term	Ministerial title
Shane Stone	Country Liberal	13 November 1990 – 19 December 1991	Minister for Employment and Training
20 December 1991 – 26 August 2001: no minister – responsibilities held by other ministers
Syd Stirling	Labor	27 August 2001 – 31 August 2006	Minister for Employment, Education and Training
Paul Henderson	Labor	1 September 2006 – 29 November 2007	Minister for Employment, Education and Training
Marion Scrymgour	Labor	30 November 2007 – 17 August 2008	Minister for Employment, Education and Training
Kon Vatskalis	Labor	18 August 2008 – 3 February 2009	Minister for Business and Employment
Paul Henderson	Labor	4 February 2009 – 3 December 2009	Minister for Major Projects, Employment and Economic Development
Rob Knight	Labor	4 December 2009 – 27 October 2011	Minister for Business and Employment
Delia Lawrie	Labor	28 October 2011 – 28 August 2012	Minister for Business and Employment
Terry Mills	Country Liberal	29 August 2012 – 3 September 2012	Minister for Business and Employment
Peter Chandler	Country Liberal	4 September 2012 – 6 March 2013	Minister for Employment and Training
Robyn Lambley	Country Liberal	7 March 2013 – 13 March 2013	Minister for Employment and Training
Dave Tollner	Country Liberal	14 March 2013 – 21 August 2014	Minister for Employment and Training
Adam Giles	Country Liberal	22 August 2014 – 11 December 2014	Minister for Employment and Training
Robyn Lambley	Country Liberal	12 December 2014 – 3 February 2015	Minister for Employment and Training
John Elferink	Country Liberal	4 February 2015 – 10 February 2015	Minister for Employment and Training
Peter Styles	Country Liberal	11 February 2015 – 27 August 2016	Minister for Employment and Training
Michael Gunner	Labor	31 August 2016 – 11 September 2016	Minister for Employment and Training

=== Industrial relations ===
Minister	Party	Term	Ministerial title
Mike Reed	Country Liberal	15 September 1997 – 8 February 1999	Minister for Industrial Relations
Daryl Manzie	Country Liberal	9 February 1999 – 3 August 1999	Minister for Public Employment and Industrial Relations
Mike Reed	Country Liberal	31 January 2000 – 26 August 2001	Minister for Public Employment and Industrial Relations
