= Australian Attorneys-General =

Within Australia, Attorney-General may refer to the following offices:

- The Attorney-General for Australia, the federal office
- The Attorneys-General of the states and territories of Australia:
  - Attorney-General of the Australian Capital Territory
  - Attorney-General of New South Wales
  - Attorney-General of the Northern Territory
  - Attorney-General of Queensland
  - Attorney-General of South Australia
  - Attorney-General of Tasmania
  - Attorney-General of Victoria
  - Attorney-General of Western Australia
