= Gerry McCarthy =

Australian politician (born 1958)

The Honourable Gerry McCarthy OAM
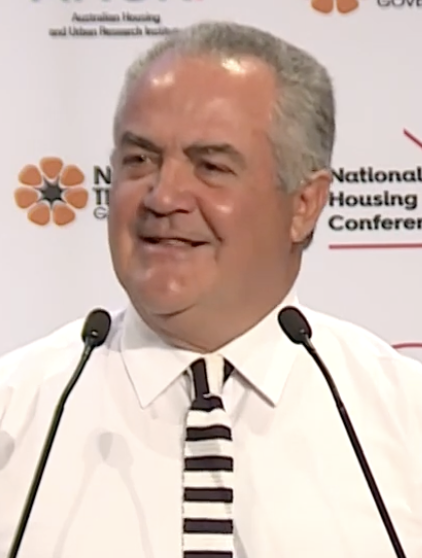
- McCarthy in 2019

Member of the Northern Territory Legislative Assembly for Barkly
- In office 9 August 2008 – 30 July 2020
- Preceded by: Elliot McAdam
- Succeeded by: Steve Edgington

Personal details
- Born: 30 June 1958 (age 67)
- Party: Labor Party
- Occupation: Teacher

Gerald Francis McCarthy (born 30 June 1958) is an Australian politician. He was a Labor member of the Northern Territory Legislative Assembly, holding the seat of Barkly from the 2008 general election until he retired at the 2020 election. He was Minister for Housing and Community Development, Minister for Essential Services and Minister for Public Employment in the Gunner Ministry from September 2016 to 2020.

Northern Territory Legislative Assembly
Years	Term	Electoral division	Party
2008–2012	11th	Barkly	Labor
2012–2016	12th	Barkly	Labor
2016–2020	13th	Barkly	Labor

McCarthy also held several ministries in Paul Henderson's cabinet: on 9 February 2009 he joined the cabinet as Minister for Transport and Minister for Correctional Services. On 6 August, he gained the additional portfolios of Arts and Museums, Senior Territorians, Young Territorians, and Minister Assisting the Chief Minister on Multicultural Affairs and Education. From 4 December 2009 to the defeat of the Henderson government at the 2012 Northern Territory election, he was Minister for Lands and Planning, Transport, Construction, Correctional Services, and Arts and Museums. McCarthy retired at 2020 election, and the Country Liberal Party won the seat.

== Political views ==
McCarthy was one of four MLAs who opposed a bill that decriminalised abortion in the Northern Territory.

Northern Territory Legislative Assembly
Preceded by Elliot McAdam	Member for Barkly; 2008–2020	Succeeded by Steve Edgington
Preceded by Bess Price as Minister for Housing	Minister for Housing and Community Development; 2016–2020	Succeeded by Kate Worden as Minister for Territory Families and Urban Housing
Preceded by Bess Price as Minister for Housing	Minister for Housing and Community Development; 2016–2020	Succeeded by Chansey Paech as Minister for Remote Housing and Town Camps
Preceded by Peter Chandler	Minister for Essential Services; 2016–2020	Succeeded by Eva Lawler
Preceded by Peter Styles	Minister for Public Employment; 2016–2020	Succeeded by Paul Kirby
