= Martin ministry (disambiguation) =

Martin ministry may refer to:

- Martin ministry (1863–1865), the Colony of New South Wales government, led by James Martin
- Martin ministry (1866–1868), the Colony of New South Wales government, led by James Martin
- Martin ministry (1870–1872), the Colony of New South Wales government, led by James Martin
- Joseph Martin ministry, the government of the Canadian province of British Columbia, led by Joseph Martin in 1900
- Martin ministry, the government of the Australian territory of Northern Territory, led by Clare Martin from 2001 to 2007

== See also ==
- 27th Canadian Ministry, led by Paul Martin
- 32nd Government of Ireland, led by Micheál Martin
