= Minister for Lands, Planning and Environment =

- Incumbent; Joshua Burgoyne since 27 June 2018
- Department of Lands, Planning and Environment
- Style: The Honourable
- Appointer: Administrator of the Northern Territory

The Northern Territory Minister for Lands, Planning and Environment is a Minister of the Crown in the Government of the Northern Territory. The minister administers their portfolio through the Department of Lands, Planning and Environment.

The Minister is responsible for Aboriginal carbon and water policy, biodiversity conservation and assessment, climate change, the conservation of pastoral land, environmental protection and sustainability, environment strategy and policy, environmental assessment, environmental compliance and enforcement, land and water resources assessment and management, pastoral land administration, rural bushfire management, strategic direction on environmental matters, volunteer bushfire management and weed management. This also includes responsibility for the Northern Territory Environment Protection Authority.

The Minister for Lands, Planning and Environment also has responsibilities for Aboriginal sacred sites, and oversees the Aboriginal Areas Protection Authority (AAPA).

When Eva Lawler (Labor) was appointed to the ministry in 2018, it was expanded to include the responsibilities of the formerly distinct Land Resource Management ministry.

== List of ministers ==
=== Environment and natural resources ===
Minister	Party	Term	Ministerial title
Ian Tuxworth	Country Liberal	1 December 1982 – 12 December 1983	Minister for Primary Production and Conservation
Noel Padgham-Purich	Country Liberal	13 December 1983 – 20 December 1984	Minister for Housing and Conservation
Stephen Hatton	Country Liberal	21 December 1984 – 28 April 1986	Minister for Conservation
Barry Coulter	Country Liberal	29 April 1986 – 14 May 1986	Minister for Conservation
Terry McCarthy	Country Liberal	15 May 1986 – 18 March 1987	Minister for Conservation
Ray Hanrahan	Country Liberal	19 March 1987 – 20 December 1987	Minister for Conservation
Daryl Manzie	Country Liberal	21 December 1987 – 3 September 1989	Minister for Conservation
Stephen Hatton	Country Liberal	4 September 1989 – 12 November 1990	Minister for Conservation
Mike Reed	Country Liberal	13 November 1990 – 29 November 1992	Minister for Conservation
Daryl Manzie	Country Liberal	30 November 1992 – 15 September 1993	Minister for Conservation
Barry Coulter	Country Liberal	16 September 1993 – 30 June 1995	Minister for Conservation
Mike Reed	Country Liberal	1 July 1995 – 14 September 1997	Minister for Lands, Planning and Environment
Mick Palmer	Country Liberal	15 September 1997 – 7 December 1998	Minister for Lands, Planning and Environment
Tim Baldwin	Country Liberal	8 December 1998 – 26 August 2001	Minister for Lands, Planning and Environment
Kon Vatskalis	Labor	27 August 2001 – 12 November 2001	Minister for Lands, Planning and Environment
Kon Vatskalis	Labor	13 November 2001 – 17 October 2002	Minister for the Environment
Chris Burns	Labor	18 October 2002 – 14 December 2003	Minister for the Environment and Heritage
Marion Scrymgour	Labor	15 December 2003 – 10 July 2005	Minister for the Environment and Heritage
Marion Scrymgour	Labor	11 July 2005 – 6 August 2007	Minister for Natural Resources, Environment and Heritage
Delia Lawrie	Labor	7 August 2007 – 29 November 2007	Minister for Natural Resources, Environment and Heritage
Len Kiely	Labor	30 November 2007 – 17 August 2008	Minister for Natural Resources, Environment and Heritage
Alison Anderson	Labor	18 August 2008 – 5 August 2009	Minister for Natural Resources, Environment and Heritage
Karl Hampton	Labor	6 August 2009 – 28 August 2012	Minister for Natural Resources, Environment and Heritage
Terry Mills	Country Liberal	29 August 2012 – 3 September 2012	Minister for Natural Resources, Environment and Heritage
Terry Mills	Country Liberal	4 September 2012 – 13 December 2012	Minister for Lands, Planning and the Environment
Peter Chandler	Country Liberal	14 December 2012 – 11 December 2014	Minister for Lands, Planning and the Environment
Gary Higgins	Country Liberal	12 December 2014 – 27 August 2016	Minister for the Environment
Michael Gunner	Labor	31 August 2016 – 11 September 2016	Minister for the Environment
Lauren Moss	Labor	12 September 2016 – 26 June 2018	Minister for Environment and Natural Resources
Eva Lawler	Labor	27 June 2018 – 23 May 2022	Minister for Environment and Natural Resources
Joshua Burgoyne	Country Liberal	28 August 2024 – present	Minister for Lands, Planning and Environment; Minister for Water Resources

=== Renewables ===
Minister	Party	Term	Ministerial title
Paul Henderson	Labor	30 November 2007 – 3 December 2009	Minister for Climate Change
Karl Hampton	Labor	4 December 2009 – 28 August 2012	Minister for Climate Change
Terry Mills	Country Liberal	29 August 2012 – 3 September 2012	Minister for Climate Change
4 September 2012 – 20 December 2018: no minister – responsibilities held by other ministers
Eva Lawler	Labor	21 December 2018 – 23 May 2022	Minister for Climate Change
Gerard Maley	Country Liberal	28 August 2024 – present	Minister for Mining and Energy; Minister for Renewables

=== Parks and Wildlife ===
Minister	Party	Term	Ministerial title
Marie-Clare Boothby	Country Liberal	28 August 2024 – present	Minister for Parks and Wildlife

== Former posts ==
=== Land resource management ===
Minister	Party	Term	Ministerial title
Terry Mills	Country Liberal	4 September 2012 – 13 December 2012	Minister for Land Resource Management
Willem Westra van Holthe	Country Liberal	14 December 2012 – 14 February 2016	Minister for Land Resource Management
Gary Higgins	Country Liberal	15 February 2016 – 27 August 2016	Minister for Land Resource Management
Michael Gunner	Labor	31 August 2016 – 11 September 2016	Minister for Land Resource Management

== See also ==
- Minister for the Environment and Water (Australia)
- Minister for Environment (New South Wales)
- Minister for the Environment (Victoria)
- Minister for Environment (Western Australia)
