= Members of the Northern Territory Legislative Assembly, 2012–2016 =

Members of the Northern Territory Legislative Assembly from 2012 to 2016 are listed below.

Name	Party	Electorate	Term in office
Hon Alison Anderson	CLP/Independent/Palmer United/Independent^{[3]}^{[6]}	Namatjira	2005–2016
Nathan Barrett^{[2]}	CLP/Independent^{[10]}	Blain	2014–2016
Hon Peter Chandler	CLP	Brennan	2008–2016
Hon Matt Conlan	CLP	Greatorex	2007–2016
Hon John Elferink	CLP	Port Darwin	1997–2005, 2008–2016
Lia Finocchiaro	CLP	Drysdale	2012–present
Natasha Fyles	Labor	Nightcliff	2012–present
Hon Adam Giles	CLP	Braitling	2008–2016
Michael Gunner	Labor	Fannie Bay	2008–present
Paul Henderson^{[1]}	Labor	Wanguri	1999–2013
Gary Higgins	CLP	Daly	2012–2020
Francis Xavier Kurrupuwu	CLP/Independent/Palmer United/CLP^{[3]}^{[4]}	Arafura	2012–2016
Hon Robyn Lambley	CLP/Independent^{[7]}	Araluen	2010–present
Delia Lawrie	Labor/Independent ^{[9]}	Karama	2001–2016
Larisa Lee	CLP/Independent/Palmer United/Independent^{[3]}^{[6]}	Arnhem	2012–2016
Nicole Manison^{[1]}	Labor	Wanguri	2013–present
Gerry McCarthy	Labor	Barkly	2008–2020
Hon Terry Mills^{[2]}	CLP	Blain	1999–2014, 2016–2020
Lauren Moss ^{[5]}	Labor	Casuarina	2014–present
Bess Price	CLP	Stuart	2012–2016
Kezia Purick	CLP/Independent^{[8]}	Goyder	2008–present
Peter Styles	CLP	Sanderson	2008–2016
Hon Dave Tollner	CLP	Fong Lim	2008–2016
Kon Vatskalis ^{[5]}	Labor	Casuarina	2001–2014
Ken Vowles	Labor	Johnston	2012–2020
Lynne Walker	Labor	Nhulunbuy	2008–2016
Hon Willem Westra van Holthe	CLP	Katherine	2008–2016
Gerry Wood	Independent	Nelson	2001–2020

== Notes ==
^{1} On 25 January 2013, the Labor member for Wanguri and former Chief Minister of the Northern Territory, Paul Henderson, resigned. Labor candidate Nicole Manison won the by-election on 16 February 2013
^{2} On 20 February 2014, the CLP member for Blain and former Chief Minister of the Northern Territory, Terry Mills, resigned. CLP candidate Nathan Barrett won the by-election on 12 April 2014.
^{3} On 4 April 2014, CLP MLAs Alison Anderson (Namatjira), Francis Xavier Kurrupuwu (Arafura) and Larisa Lee (Arnhem) resigned from the party to sit as independents. On 27 April, it was announced that they had joined the Palmer United Party, with Anderson as leader of the party in the Territory.
^{4} On 8 September 2014, Palmer United MLA Francis Xavier Kurrupuwu (Arafura) resigned from the PUP and returned to the CLP.
^{5} On 18 September 2014, the Labor member for Casuarina, Kon Vatskalis, resigned. Labor candidate Lauren Moss won the resulting by-election on 18 October 2014.
^{6} On 29 November 2014, the Palmer United Party's two MLAs, Alison Anderson and Larisa Lee, announced that they would quit the PUP and return to their former status as independent MLAs.
^{7} On 17 June 2015, CLP MLA Robyn Lambley (Araluen) resigned from the CLP to sit as an independent.
^{8} On 20 July 2015, CLP MLA Kezia Purick (Goyder) resigned from the CLP to sit as an independent.
^{9} On 10 October 2015, Labor MLA Delia Lawrie (Karama) resigned from the party to sit as an independent following her loss of preselection for 2016.
^{10} On 28 June 2016, CLP MLA Nathan Barrett resigned from the party to sit as an independent.

== See also ==
- 2012 Northern Territory general election
