= Fay Miller =

Australian politician (1947–2023)

Fay Miller AM

Member of the Northern Territory Legislative Assembly for Katherine
- In office 4 October 2003 – 21 July 2008
- Preceded by: Mike Reed
- Succeeded by: Willem Westra van Holthe

Personal details
- Born: 8 April 1947 Ceduna, South Australia
- Died: 1 April 2023 (aged 75) Darwin, Northern Territory
- Party: Country Liberal Party

Christina Fay Miller AM (8 April 1947 – 1 April 2023) was an Australian politician. She was the Country Liberal Party member for Katherine in the Northern Territory Legislative Assembly from 2003 to 2008.

Northern Territory Legislative Assembly
Years	Term	Electoral division	Party
2003–2005	9th	Katherine	Country Liberal
2005–2008	10th	Katherine	Country Liberal

Miller was born in South Australia, moving to Katherine in 1989. In South Australia she had worked in clerical positions and in Katherine she was an office manager before she and her husband purchased Red Gum Tourist Park. In 2003 she was elected to the Assembly in a by-election following Mike Reed's resignation. She was deputy leader of the CLP for a period and served on the front bench. In 2006 she was involved in a car accident and sustained serious injuries, which was a contributing factor towards her retirement in 2008. In March 2012, she was elected the new mayor of Katherine.

In the 2021 Australia Day Honours Miller was appointed a Member of the Order of Australia for "significant service to local government, to tourism, and to the community of Katherine".

Miller died from primary myelofibrosis on 1 April 2023, at the age of 75.

Northern Territory Legislative Assembly
Preceded by Mike Reed	Member for Katherine; 2003–2008	Succeeded by Willem Westra van Holthe
Civic offices
Preceded by Anne Shepherd	Mayor of Katherine; 2012–2020	Succeeded by Lis Clark
