= Members of the Northern Territory Legislative Assembly, 2008–2012 =

This members of the Northern Territory Legislative Assembly from 2008 to 2012 are listed below.

Name	Party	Electorate	Term in office
Hon Jane Aagaard	Labor	Nightcliff	2001–2012
Hon Alison Anderson	Labor/Independent/CLP ^{[2]}	MacDonnell	2005–2016
Ross Bohlin	CLP/Independent ^{[4]}	Drysdale	2008–2012
Dr Chris Burns	Labor	Johnston	2001–2012
Jodeen Carney ^{[3]}	CLP	Araluen	2001–2010
Peter Chandler	CLP	Brennan	2008–2016
Matt Conlan	CLP	Greatorex	2007–2016
John Elferink	CLP	Port Darwin	1997–2005, 2008–2016
Adam Giles	CLP	Braitling	2008–2016
Michael Gunner	Labor	Fannie Bay	2008–present
Karl Hampton	Labor	Stuart	2006–2012
Hon Paul Henderson	Labor	Wanguri	1999–2013
Hon Rob Knight	Labor	Daly	2005–2012
Robyn Lambley^{[3]}	CLP	Araluen	2010–present
Hon Delia Lawrie	Labor	Karama	2001–2016
Hon Gerry McCarthy	Labor	Barkly	2008–2020
Hon Malarndirri McCarthy	Labor	Arnhem	2005–2012
Terry Mills	CLP	Blain	1999–2014, 2016–2020
Kezia Purick	CLP	Goyder	2008–present
Marion Scrymgour	Labor/Independent/Labor^{[1]}	Arafura	2001–2012
Peter Styles	CLP	Sanderson	2008–2016
Dave Tollner	CLP	Fong Lim	2008–2016
Hon Kon Vatskalis	Labor	Casuarina	2001–2014
Lynne Walker	Labor	Nhulunbuy	2008–2016
Willem Westra van Holthe	CLP	Katherine	2008–2016
Gerry Wood	Independent	Nelson	2001–2020

== Notes ==
^{1} Arafura MLA and former Deputy Chief Minister Marion Scrymgour resigned from the Labor on 4 June 2009 and sat as an independent. She rejoined the Labor Party on 4 August 2009.
^{2} MacDonnell MLA Alison Anderson resigned from the Labor Party on 4 August 2009 to sit as an independent. She subsequently joined the Country Liberal Party on 9 September 2011.
^{3} Araluen CLP MLA Jodeen Carney resigned on 3 September 2010. CLP candidate Robyn Lambley won the resulting by-election was held on 9 October 2010.
^{4} Drysdale CLP MLA Ross Bohlin lost party preselection to contest his seat for the next election, and announced his intention to run as an independent on 11 July 2012.

== See also ==
- 2008 Northern Territory general election
- 2012 Northern Territory general election
- 2010 Araluen by-election
