= Minister for Health (Northern Territory) =

Australian Northern Territory government minister

- Incumbent; Steve Edgington since 12 September 2016
- Department of Health
- Style: The Honourable
- Appointer: Administrator of the Northern Territory

The Northern Territory Minister for Health is a Minister of the Crown in the Government of the Northern Territory of Australia. The minister administers their portfolio through the Department of Health.

The Minister is responsible for adult guardianship, alcohol and other drug services, alcohol management plans, alcohol policy, alcohol treatment and rehabilitation, community service complaints, food standards, health (including hospital and medical services), health complaints, human quarantine, mental health services, morgues, National Disability Insurance Scheme (NDIS) implementation, services to the aged, services to disabled people, sexual assault services, university medical education and research and water quality. They are also responsible for the Menzies School of Health Research, the Health and Community Services Complaints Commission and the Public Guardian.

The current minister is Steve Edgington (Country Liberal Party).

== List of ministers ==
=== Health ===
Minister	Party	Term	Ministerial title
Ian Tuxworth	Country Liberal	September 1977 - June 1978	Executive Member for Resources and Health
Ian Tuxworth	Country Liberal	1 July 1978 – 30 November 1982	Minister for Health
Nick Dondas	Country Liberal	1 December 1982 – 12 December 1983	Minister for Health and Housing
Nick Dondas	Country Liberal	13 December 1983 – 16 October 1984	Minister for Health, Youth, Sport, Recreation and Ethnic Affairs
Nick Dondas	Country Liberal	17 October 1984 – 20 December 1984	Minister for Health, Sport, Recreation and Ethnic Affairs
Jim Robertson	Country Liberal	21 December 1984 – 19 August 1985	Minister for Health
Ray Hanrahan	Country Liberal	20 August 1985 – 28 April 1986	Minister for Health
Tom Harris	Country Liberal	29 April 1986 – 18 March 1987	Minister for Health
Don Dale	Country Liberal	19 March 1987 – 30 July 1989	Minister for Health and Community Services
Marshall Perron	Country Liberal	31 July 1989 – 3 September 1989	Minister for Health and Community Services
Stephen Hatton	Country Liberal	4 September 1989 – 12 November 1990	Minister for Health and Community Services
Daryl Manzie	Country Liberal	13 November 1990 – 29 November 1992	Minister for Health and Community Services
Mike Reed	Country Liberal	30 November 1992 – 30 June 1995	Minister for Health and Community Services
Fred Finch	Country Liberal	1 July 1995 – 20 June 1996	Minister for Health Services
Denis Burke	Country Liberal	21 June 1996 – 14 September 1997	Minister for Health Services
Denis Burke	Country Liberal	15 September 1997 – 8 February 1999	Minister for Health, Family and Children’s Services
Stephen Dunham	Country Liberal	9 February 1999 – 26 August 2001	Minister for Health, Family and Children’s Services
Jane Aagaard	Labor	27 August 2001 – 12 November 2001	Minister for Health, Family and Children’s Services
Jane Aagaard	Labor	13 November 2001 – 14 December 2003	Minister for Health and Community Services
Peter Toyne	Labor	15 December 2003 – 31 August 2006	Minister for Health
Chris Burns	Labor	1 September 2006 – 3 February 2009	Minister for Health
Kon Vatskalis	Labor	4 February 2009 - 28 August 2012	Minister for Health
Robyn Lambley	Country Liberal	29 August 2012 – 3 September 2012	Minister for Health
Dave Tollner	Country Liberal	4 September 2012 – 6 March 2013	Minister for Health
Robyn Lambley	Country Liberal	7 March 2013 – 11 December 2014	Minister for Health
Adam Giles	Country Liberal	12 December 2014 – 19 January 2015	Minister for Health
John Elferink	Country Liberal	20 January 2015 – 27 August 2016	Minister for Health
Michael Gunner	Labor	31 August 2016 – 11 September 2016	Minister for Health
Natasha Fyles	Labor	12 September 2016 – present	Minister for Health

=== Alcohol policy ===
Minister	Party	Term	Ministerial title
Chris Burns	Labor	7 August 2007 – 3 February 2009	Minister for Alcohol Policy
Marion Scrymgour	Labor	4 February 2009 – 8 February 2009	Minister for Alcohol Policy
Kon Vatskalis	Labor	9 February 2009 – 3 December 2009	Minister for Alcohol Policy
Delia Lawrie	Labor	4 December 2009 – 28 August 2012	Minister for Alcohol Policy
Terry Mills	Country Liberal	29 August 2012 – 3 September 2012	Minister for Alcohol Policy
Dave Tollner	Country Liberal	4 September 2012 – 6 March 2013	Minister for Alcohol Policy
Dave Tollner	Country Liberal	14 December 2012 – 6 March 2013	Minister for Alcohol Rehabilitation and Policy
Robyn Lambley	Country Liberal	7 March 2013 – 19 March 2013	Minister for Alcohol Rehabilitation and Policy
20 March 2013 – 8 August 2013: no minister – responsibilities held by other ministers
Dave Tollner	Country Liberal	9 August 2013 – 23 August 2014	Minister for Alcohol Policy
Adam Giles	Country Liberal	24 August 2014 – 11 December 2014	Minister for Alcohol Policy
11 December 2014 – 8 September 2020: no minister – responsibilities held by other ministers
Natasha Fyles	Labor	8 September 2020 – Present	Minister for Alcohol Policy

=== Disability services ===
Minister	Party	Term	Ministerial title
Robyn Lambley	Country Liberal	4 February 2014 – 23 August 2014	Minister for Disability Services
Adam Giles	Country Liberal	12 December 2014 – 19 January 2015	Minister for Disability Services
John Elferink	Country Liberal	20 January 2015 – 27 August 2016	Minister for Disability Services
Michael Gunner	Labor	31 August 2016 – 11 September 2016	Minister for Disability Services
12 September 2016 – 20 December 2018: no minister – responsibilities held by other ministers
Natasha Fyles	Labor	21 December 2018 – 7 September 2020	Minister for Disabilities
Kate Worden	Labor	8 September 2020 – Present	Minister for Disabilities

== Former posts ==
=== Alcohol rehabilitation ===
Minister	Party	Term	Ministerial title
Dave Tollner	Country Liberal	14 December 2012 – 6 March 2013	Minister for Alcohol Rehabilitation and Policy
Robyn Lambley	Country Liberal	7 March 2013 – 19 March 2013	Minister for Alcohol Rehabilitation and Policy
Robyn Lambley	Country Liberal	20 March 2013 – 11 December 2014	Minister for Alcohol Rehabilitation

=== Mental health services ===
Minister	Party	Term	Ministerial title
Adam Giles	Country Liberal	12 December 2014 – 19 January 2015	Minister for Mental Health Services
John Elferink	Country Liberal	20 January 2015 – 27 August 2016	Minister for Mental Health Services
Michael Gunner	Labor	31 August 2016 – 11 September 2016	Minister for Mental Health Services
