= Minister for Essential Services (Northern Territory) =

- Incumbent; Eva Lawler since 7 September 2020
- None
- Style: The Honourable
- Appointer: Administrator of the Northern Territory

The Northern Territory Minister for Essential Services is a Minister of the Crown in the Government of the Northern Territory.

The Minister is responsible for electricity generation and supply operations, public sewerage and drainage services operations, public water supplies operations, and supply and service provision under license. They are also responsible for the Power and Water Corporation, the Power Generation Corporation and the Power Retail Corporation.

The current minister is Eva Lawler (Labor), who succeeded Gerry McCarthy on 7 September 2020 following his retirement from politics.

== List of ministers for essential services ==
Minister	Party	Term	Ministerial title
Denis Burke	Country Liberal	1 July 1995 – 20 June 1996	Minister for Water and Power
Daryl Manzie	Country Liberal	21 June 1996 – 14 September 1997	Minister for Water and Power
Eric Poole	Country Liberal	15 September 1997 – 7 December 1998	Minister for Essential Services
Barry Coulter	Country Liberal	8 December 1998 – 18 June 1999	Minister for Essential Services
Mike Reed	Country Liberal	21 June 1999 – 30 January 2000	Minister for Essential Services
Stephen Dunham	Country Liberal	31 January 2000 – 26 August 2001	Minister for Essential Services
Jack Ah Kit	Labor	27 August 2001 – 12 November 2001	Minister for Essential Services
Kon Vatskalis	Labor	13 November 2001 – 17 October 2002	Minister for Essential Services
Chris Burns	Labor	18 October 2002 – 10 July 2005	Minister for Essential Services
Paul Henderson	Labor	11 July 2005 – 31 August 2006	Minister for Essential Services
Kon Vatskalis	Labor	1 September 2006 – 17 August 2008	Minister for Essential Services
Rob Knight	Labor	18 August 2008 – 28 August 2012	Minister for Essential Services
Terry Mills	Country Liberal	29 August 2012 – 3 September 2012	Minister for Essential Services
Dave Tollner	Country Liberal	4 September 2012 – 13 December 2012	Minister for Essential Services
Willem Westra van Holthe	Country Liberal	14 December 2012 – 14 February 2016	Minister for Essential Services
Peter Chandler	Country Liberal	15 February 2016 – 27 August 2016	Minister for Essential Services
Michael Gunner	Labor	31 August 2016 – 11 September 2016	Minister for Essential Services
Gerry McCarthy	Labor	12 September 2016 – 7 September 2020	Minister for Essential Services
Eva Lawler	Labor	7 September 2020 - present	Minister for Essential Services
