= Minister for Corporate and Digital Development =

Minister for Tourism and Culture
- Incumbent; Lauren Moss since 12 September 2016
- Department of Corporate and Information Services
- Style: The Honourable
- Appointer: Administrator of the Northern Territory

The Northern Territory Minister for Corporate Information Services is a Minister of the Crown in the Government of the Northern Territory. The minister administers their portfolio through the Department of Corporate and Information Services.

The Minister is responsible for advice on corporate tax legislation, asset systems, banking arrangements, government office accommodation, information, communications and technology policy and governance, the government vehicle fleet, print management, public sector corporate services, public sector information systems and services, public sector workers' compensation administration and the records service.

The current minister is Lauren Moss (Labor). She was sworn in on 12 September 2016 following the Labor victory at the 2016 election.

== Ministers for Corporate Information Services ==
Minister	Party	Term	Ministerial title
Mike Reed	Country Liberal	19 October 1998 – 7 December 1998	Minister for Corporate and Information Services
Daryl Manzie	Country Liberal	8 December 1998 – 3 August 1999	Minister for Corporate and Information Services
Peter Adamson	Country Liberal	4 August 1999 – 26 August 2001	Minister for Corporate and Information Services
Peter Toyne	Labor	27 August 2001 – 14 December 2003	Minister for Corporate and Information Services
Paul Henderson	Labor	15 December 2003 – 23 June 2005	Minister for Corporate and Information Services
Chris Burns	Labor	24 June 2005 – 31 August 2006	Minister for Corporate and Information Services
Elliot McAdam	Labor	1 September 2006 – 14 February 2008	Minister for Corporate and Information Services
Matthew Bonson	Labor	15 February 2008 – 17 August 2008	Minister for Corporate and Information Services
18 August 2008 – 3 September 2012: no minister – responsibilities held by other ministers
Robyn Lambley	Country Liberal	4 September 2012 – 13 December 2012	Minister for Corporate and Information Services
Adam Giles	Country Liberal	14 December 2012 – 6 March 2013	Minister for Corporate and Information Services
John Elferink	Country Liberal	7 March 2013 – 13 March 2013	Minister for Corporate and Information Services
Adam Giles	Country Liberal	14 March 2013 – 9 September 2013	Minister for Corporate and Information Services
Dave Tollner	Country Liberal	10 September 2013 – 21 August 2014	Minister for Corporate and Information Services
Adam Giles	Country Liberal	24 August 2014 – 11 December 2014	Minister for Corporate and Information Services
Peter Styles	Country Liberal	12 December 2014 – 27 August 2016	Minister for Corporate and Information Services
Michael Gunner	Labor	31 August 2016 – 11 September 2016	Minister for Corporate and Information Services
Lauren Moss	Labor	12 September 2016 – present	Minister for Corporate Information Services

== Former posts ==
=== Information, Communications and Technology Policy ===
Minister	Party	Term	Ministerial title
Paul Henderson	Labor	15 February 2008 – 17 August 2008	Minister for Information, Communications and Technology Policy
Karl Hampton	Labor	18 August 2008 – 28 August 2012	Minister for Information, Communications and Technology Policy
