= Minister for Police, Fire and Emergency Services (Northern Territory) =

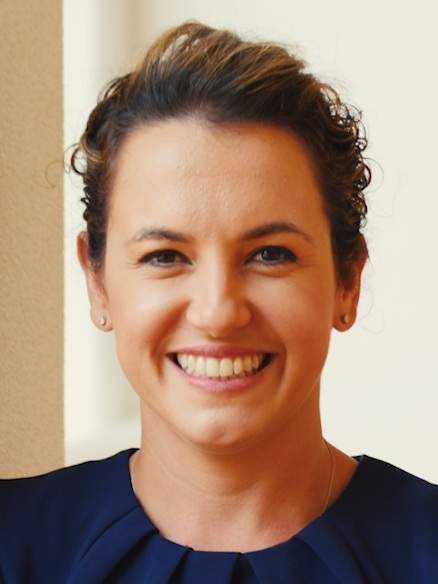
- Incumbent; Lia Finocchiaro since 28 August 2024
- None
- Style: The Honourable
- Appointer: Administrator of the Northern Territory

The Northern Territory Minister for Police and Minister for Fire and Emergency Services are Ministers of the Crown in the Government of the Northern Territory.

The Minister for Police oversees the Northern Territory Police. The Minister for Fire and Emergency Services is responsible for police, emergency services, volunteer emergency management, fire and rescue services and volunteer fire and rescue management. Chief Minister Lia Finocchiaro was appointed to both positions in 2024.

== Ministers for Police, Fire and Emergency Services ==
Minister	Party	Term	Ministerial title
Marshall Perron	Country Liberal	4 September 1989 – 17 July 1994	Minister for Police, Fire and Emergency Services
Daryl Manzie	Country Liberal	18 July 1994 – 30 June 1995	Minister for Police, Fire and Emergency Services
Shane Stone	Country Liberal	1 July 1995 – 14 September 1997	Minister for Police, Fire and Emergency Services
Mike Reed	Country Liberal	15 September 1997 – 26 August 2001	Minister for Police, Fire and Emergency Services
Syd Stirling	Labor	27 August 2001 – 17 October 2002	Minister for Police, Fire and Emergency Services
Paul Henderson	Labor	18 October 2002 – 31 August 2006	Minister for Police, Fire and Emergency Services
Chris Burns	Labor	1 September 2006 – 6 August 2007	Minister for Police, Fire and Emergency Services
Clare Martin	Labor	7 August 2007 – 25 November 2007	Minister for Police, Fire and Emergency Services
Paul Henderson	Labor	26 November 2007 - 28 August 2012	Minister for Police, Fire and Emergency Services
Terry Mills	Country Liberal	29 August 2012 - 13 March 2013	Minister for Police, Fire and Emergency Services
Adam Giles	Country Liberal	14 March 2013 – 11 December 2014	Minister for Police, Fire and Emergency Services
Peter Chandler	Country Liberal	12 December 2014 – 14 February 2016	Minister for Police, Fire and Emergency Services
Michael Gunner	Labor	31 August 2016 – 26 June 2018	Minister for Police, Fire and Emergency Services
Nicole Manison	Labor	26 June 2018 – 23 May 2022	Minister for Police, Fire and Emergency Services
Lia Finocchiaro	Country Liberal	28 August 2024 – present	Minister for Police; Minister for Fire and Emergency Services

== Ministers for Corrections ==
Minister	Party	Term	Ministerial title
Gerard Maley	Country Liberal	28 August 2024 – present	Minister for Corrections
