= Treasurer of the Northern Territory =

- Coat of arms of the Northern Territory

- Flag of the Northern Territory
- Incumbent; Bill Yan since 9 September 2024
- Department of Treasury and Finance
- Style: The Honourable
- Member of: Parliament; Cabinet; Executive Council
- Reports to: Chief Minister of the Northern Territory
- Seat: Darwin, Northern Territory
- Nominator: Chief Minister of the Northern Territory
- Appointer: Administrator of the Northern Territory; on the advice of the chief minister
- Term length: At the Administrator's pleasure
- Formation: 1 July 1978
- First holder: Marshall Perron

The Treasurer of the Northern Territory is the title held by the Northern Territory Government cabinet minister who is responsible for the financial management of Northern Territory's budget sector.

== List of treasurers of the Northern Territory ==
The following individuals have served as the Treasurer of the Northern Territory, or any precursor title:

Order	Treasurer	Party	Term start	Term end	Time in office	Notes
1	Marshall Perron	Country Liberal Party	1 July 1978	20 December 1984	6 years, 172 days	
2	Ian Tuxworth	Country Liberal Party	21 December 1984	28 April 1986	1 year, 128 days	
3	Barry Coulter	Country Liberal Party	29 April 1986	13 July 1988	2 years, 75 days	
–	Marshall Perron	Country Liberal Party	14 July 1988	12 November 1990	2 years, 129 days	
–	Barry Coulter	Country Liberal Party	13 November 1990	30 June 1995	4 years, 229 days	
4	Mike Reed	Country Liberal Party	1 July 1995	26 August 2001	6 years, 56 days	
5	Clare Martin	Labor Party	27 August 2001	17 October 2002	1 year, 51 days	
6	Syd Stirling	Labor Party	18 October 2002	25 November 2007	5 years, 38 days	
7	Paul Henderson	Labor Party	26 November 2007	29 November 2007	3 days	
8	Delia Lawrie	Labor Party	30 November 2007	28 August 2012	4 years, 272 days	
9	Terry Mills	Country Liberal Party	29 August 2012	3 September 2012	5 days	
10	Robyn Lambley	Country Liberal Party	4 September 2012	6 March 2013	183 days	
11	John Elferink	Country Liberal Party	7 March 2013	13 March 2013	6 days	
12	Dave Tollner	Country Liberal Party	14 March 2013	23 August 2014	1 year, 162 days	
13	Adam Giles	Country Liberal Party	24 August 2014	10 February 2015	170 days	
–	Dave Tollner	Country Liberal Party	11 February 2015	30 October 2016	1 year, 262 days	
14	Nicole Manison	Labor Party	31 August 2016	7 September 2020	4 years, 7 days	
15	Michael Gunner	Labor Party	8 September 2020	13 May 2022	1 year, 247 days	
16	Natasha Fyles	Labor Party	13 May 2022	23 May 2022	10 days	
17	Eva Lawler	Labor Party	23 May 2022	28 August 2024	2 years, 96 days	
18	Lia Finocchiaro	Country Liberal Party	28 August 2024	9 September 2024	12 days	
19	Bill Yan	Country Liberal Party	9 September 2024	incumbent	2 years, 36 days	

== List of Executive Members for Finance ==
In the period prior to 1978, the responsible government of the Northern Territory was administered via the Australian Government Department of the Northern Territory. During a transition period between 1974 and 1978, the following individuals served as the Executive Member for Finance:

Order	Executive Member for Finance	Party	Term start	Term end	Time in office	Notes
1	Paul Everingham	Country Liberal Party	November 1974	August 1975	273 days	
2	Bernie Kilgariff	Country Liberal Party	August 1975	30 November 1975	120 days	
3	Grant Tambling	Country Liberal Party	1 December 1975	September 1977	1 year, 274 days	
4	Marshall Perron	Country Liberal Party	September 1977	30 June 1978	301 days	
