= Deputy Chief Minister of the Northern Territory =

- Coat of arms of the Northern Territory

- Flag of the Northern Territory
- Incumbent; Gerard Maley since 9 September 2024
- Department of the Chief Minister
- Style: The Honourable
- Member of: Parliament; Cabinet; Executive Council
- Reports to: Chief Minister of the Northern Territory
- Seat: Darwin, Northern Territory
- Nominator: Chief Minister of the Northern Territory
- Appointer: Administrator of the Northern Territory on the advice of the chief minister
- Term length: At the Administrator's pleasure
- Formation: 20 November 1974
- First holder: Paul Everingham

The deputy chief minister of the Northern Territory is a role in the Government of the Northern Territory assigned to a responsible Minister in the Northern Territory. It has second ranking behind the chief minister of the Northern Territory in Cabinet, and its holder serves as acting chief minister during absence or incapacity of the chief minister. The deputy chief minister is almost always the deputy leader of the governing party.

The incumbent deputy chief minister of the Northern Territory is Gerard Maley. Maley assumed the position in September 2024, becoming the first deputy chief minister of the current Country Liberal Government since September 2024.

== List of deputy chief ministers of the Northern Territory ==
Deputy Chief Minister	Party	Period in office
Paul Everingham	Country Liberal Party	20 November 1974 – 11 August 1975
Bernie Kilgariff	Country Liberal Party	12 August 1975 – 1 December 1975
Grant Tambling	Country Liberal Party	2 December 1975 – 20 September 1977
Marshall Perron	Country Liberal Party	21 September 1977 – 12 December 1983
Nick Dondas	Country Liberal Party	13 December 1983 – 14 May 1986
Barry Coulter	Country Liberal Party	15 May 1986 – 18 March 1987
Ray Hanrahan	Country Liberal Party	19 March 1987 – 5 April 1988
Barry Coulter	Country Liberal Party	6 April 1988 – 25 May 1995
Mike Reed	Country Liberal Party	26 May 1995 – 26 August 2001
Syd Stirling	Labor Party	27 August 2001 – 25 November 2007
Marion Scrymgour	Labor Party	26 November 2007 – 8 February 2009
Delia Lawrie	Labor Party	9 February 2009 – 29 August 2012
Robyn Lambley	Country Liberal Party	29 August 2012 – 6 March 2013
Willem Westra van Holthe	Country Liberal Party	6 March 2013 – 13 March 2013
Dave Tollner	Country Liberal Party	13 March 2013 – 22 August 2014
Peter Chandler	Country Liberal Party	1 September 2014 – 3 February 2015
Willem Westra van Holthe	Country Liberal Party	3 February 2015 – 14 February 2016
Peter Styles	Country Liberal Party	16 February 2016 – 31 August 2016
Nicole Manison	Labor Party	12 September 2016 – 21 December 2023
Chansey Paech	Labor Party	21 December 2023 – 28 August 2024
Gerard Maley	Country Liberal Party	9 September 2024 – present

== See also ==
- List of chief ministers of the Northern Territory by time in office
