= Peter Styles (politician) =

Australian politician (born 1953)

The Worshipful Peter Styles
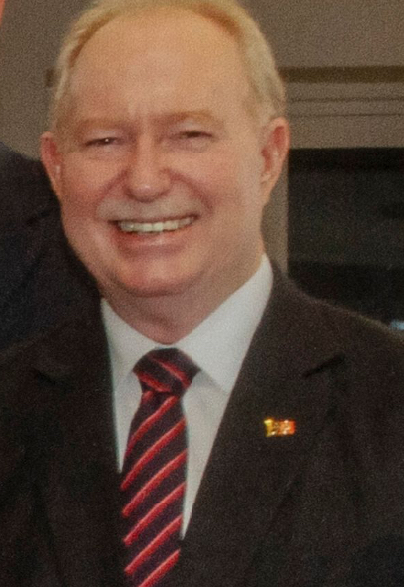
- Styles in 2015

Lord Mayor of Darwin
- Incumbent
- Assumed office 6 September 2025
- Preceded by: Kon Vatskalis

Deputy Chief Minister of the Northern Territory
- In office 16 February 2016 – 31 August 2016
- Leader: Adam Giles
- Preceded by: Willem Westra van Holthe
- Succeeded by: Nicole Manison

Member of the Northern Territory Parliament for Sanderson
- In office 9 August 2008 – 27 August 2016
- Preceded by: Len Kiely
- Succeeded by: Kate Worden

Personal details
- Born: 8 July 1953 (age 73) Perth, Western Australia
- Party: Independent (since 2022)
- Other political affiliations: Country Liberal (until 2022)
- Spouse: Linda Fazldeen
- Education: Charles Darwin University
- Occupation: Police officer

Peter Donald Styles (born 8 July 1953) is an Australian politician. He was a Country Liberal Party member of the Northern Territory Legislative Assembly from 2008 to 2016, representing the electorate of Sanderson.

Born in Perth, Western Australia, Styles owned and operated a multi-purpose ship and worked as a public servant for the state government, before joining Western Australia Police. In 1981, he moved to Darwin and transferred to the Northern Territory Police where he served for 27 years. In 1991, he was awarded the National Medal, and was upgraded to 1st clasp in 2001.

Northern Territory Legislative Assembly
Years	Term	Electoral division	Party
2008–2012	11th	Sanderson	Country Liberal
2012–2016	12th	Sanderson	Country Liberal

In 2008, he ran for parliament and was elected to the seat of Sanderson. He first served in the new CLP government as the Government Whip and Parliamentary Secretary assisting the Chief Minister with Multicultural Affairs, Young Territorians and Senior Territorians. He was later appointed to cabinet as Minister for Business; Racing, Gaming and Licensing; Asian Engagement and Trade; Employment and Training; Corporate and Information Services; Multicultural Affairs; Young Territorians; Senior Territorians; and Defence Industries. In February 2016, he was also voted deputy leader of the Country Liberals and became Deputy Chief Minister of the Northern Territory following the resignation from cabinet of Willem Westra van Holthe.

Peter announced his support for voluntary euthanasia in 2010, citing his experience watching his wife Rhonda die from a terminal illness in 1989.

In April 2022, Styles and his wife left the Country Liberal Party, citing "concerns over the future direction of the party".

In the 2025 Darwin City Council elections, Styles ran successfully for mayor, winning 53.2% of the vote after preferences and succeeding Kon Vatskalis in the position. This is despite evidence of electoral interference by Styles' wife, Linda Fazldeen, and fellow mayoral candidate Leah Potter, in where unauthorised How-to-vote cards were handed out at polling stations.

Northern Territory Legislative Assembly
Preceded by Len Kiely	Member for Sanderson; 2008–2016	Succeeded by Kate Worden
Political offices
Preceded by Willem Westra van Holthe	Deputy Chief Minister of the Northern Territory; 2016	Succeeded by Nicole Manison
Party political offices
Preceded by Willem Westra van Holthe	Deputy Leader of the Country Liberal Party; 2016	Succeeded by Lia Finocchiaro
