= Willem Westra van Holthe =

Australian politician (born 1962)

The Honourable Willem Westra van Holthe
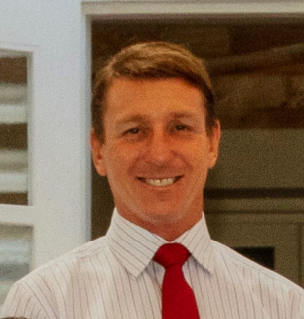
- Westra van Holthe in 2012

Deputy Chief Minister of the Northern Territory
- In office 3 February 2015 – 14 February 2016
- Leader: Adam Giles
- Preceded by: Peter Chandler
- Succeeded by: Peter Styles

Deputy Leader of the Country Liberal Party
- In office 3 February 2015 – 14 February 2016
- Leader: Adam Giles
- Preceded by: Peter Chandler
- Succeeded by: Peter Styles

Member of the Northern Territory Parliament for Katherine
- In office 9 August 2008 – 27 August 2016
- Preceded by: Fay Miller
- Succeeded by: Sandra Nelson

Personal details
- Born: Willem Rudolf Westra van Holthe; 22 August 1962 (age 64) Rotorua, New Zealand
- Party: Country Liberal Party
- Spouse: Jennie Westra van Holthe (former)
- Children: 3
- Occupation: Police officer

Willem Rudolf Westra van Holthe (born 22 August 1962) is an Australian politician. He was a Country Liberal Party member of the Northern Territory Legislative Assembly from 2008 to 2016, representing the electorate of Katherine. He was Deputy Chief Minister of the Northern Territory from 6–14 March 2013 and from February 2015 to February 2016, resuming the position following a leadership challenge to Chief Minister Adam Giles, in which he was briefly the Chief Minister-designate. He served as Minister for Primary Industry and Fisheries, Minister for Land Resource Management and Minister for Essential Services (2012–2016), Minister for Mines and Energy (2012–2015) and Minister for Public Employment (2015–2016) under both Terry Mills and Giles.

== Early life ==
Westra van Holthe was born in Rotorua, New Zealand, to a Dutch father and Australian mother. His family moved to Australia and settled in Brisbane, Queensland.

Westra van Holthe moved to the Northern Territory in 1984 to work as a labourer on such projects as the Elizabeth River Bridge and the Arnhem Highway. In 1986, he joined the Northern Territory Police where he served until 2000—when he left the force to run a small business with his wife Jennie—and again from 2002 to 2008. As a police officer, he was stationed at Maranboy, Mataranka and Alice Springs, then at Katherine on his return to the police force.

== Political career ==
Northern Territory Legislative Assembly
Years	Term	Electoral division	Party
2008–2012	11th	Katherine	Country Liberal
2012–2016	12th	Katherine	Country Liberal

In 2008, Westra van Holthe left the police to pursue a career in politics where he felt he could have a greater influence on law formation and implementation. He was preselected by the Country Liberal Party (CLP) as a candidate for the electorate of Katherine where the sitting member Fay Miller was retiring. He was elected at the Territory election in August 2008 on a swing of over five percent, enough to revert Katherine to its traditional status as a safe CLP seat.

The CLP won government at the 2012 election, with Westra van Holthe picking up a massive 13.8 percent swing. He now sat on a majority of 22.3 percent, making Katherine the safest seat in the Territory. He was appointed as Minister for Primary Industry and Fisheries and Minister for Mines and Energy in the first ministry under Chief Minister Terry Mills.

On 6 March 2013, Dave Tollner attempted to challenge Mills for the party leadership, although Mills averted any leadership ballot taking place after a six-hour party room meeting. Tollner was sacked from cabinet, and deputy leader Robyn Lambley resigned. In the ensuing reshuffle, Westra van Holthe became deputy leader of the CLP, and hence Deputy Chief Minister, replacing Lambley, also assuming the portfolios of Trade, Land Resource Management, Public Employment, and Essential Services. Less than a week later, Westra van Holthe was acting Chief Minister whilst Terry Mills was in Japan on a trade visit. Adam Giles made a successful challenge to Mills' leadership, becoming CLP leader and installing Toller as his deputy, although Westra van Holthe retained his other ministries apart from the trade and employment portfolios.

On 2 February 2015, Westra van Holthe challenged Giles for the leadership of the Country Liberal Party in a late night party room meeting. At a 1 am media conference on 3 February, Westra van Holthe announced that the party had voted for him to replace Giles as leader with John Elferink as his deputy, and that his new cabinet would be sworn in on 4 February. The ABC reported that the ballot was nine votes to five in favour of Westra van Holthe. During the press conference Westra van Holthe referred to himself as the "Chief Minister apparent". He also promised a more consultative approach to governing.

Westra van Holthe's plans to be sworn in as Chief Minister later in the day were halted by Giles' refusal to sign a document confirming his resignation. Additionally, there was the possibility that the CLP members who maintained their support for Giles would break party discipline and refuse to support Westra van Holthe on the floor of the legislature, leaving him short of the 13 votes he needed to govern. This raised the prospect of Westra van Holthe not surviving his first parliamentary sitting. A meeting of the CLP's parliamentary wing took place that evening, as the party sought to resolve the internal crisis, with Giles eventually announcing he would remain as CLP leader and Chief Minister, with Westra van Holthe as deputy leader of the CLP and Deputy Chief Minister.

On 14 February 2016, Westra van Holthe resigned from Giles' cabinet after it emerged that he had both a financial and personal involvement with the CT Group, a Vietnamese fruit company seeking to develop a 10,000-hectare dragon fruit orchard in the NT.

Prior to the 27 August 2016 election, Katherine had been in CLP hands for its entire existence, dating to when the seat was known as Elsey, and the Katherine area had long been considered CLP heartland. Labor had only come close to winning it twice, both at the high-tide elections of 2001 and 2005. However, Labor challenger Sandra Nelson led Westra van Holthe by a margin of less than one percent on election night. Westra van Holthe's primary vote almost halved, to only 35.2 percent. It was eventually announced on 9 September that Westra van Holthe had lost by 28 votes.

Northern Territory Legislative Assembly
Preceded by Fay Miller	Member for Katherine; 2008–2016	Succeeded by Sandra Nelson
Political offices
Preceded by Robyn Lambley	Deputy Chief Minister of the Northern Territory; 2013	Succeeded by Dave Tollner
Preceded by Peter Chandler	Deputy Chief Minister of the Northern Territory; 2015–2016	Succeeded by Peter Styles
Preceded by Kon Vatskalis as Minister for Primary Industry, Fisheries and Resources	Minister for Primary Industry and Fisheries; 2012–2016	Succeeded by Gary Higgins
Preceded by Portfolio re-established	Minister for Mines and Energy; 2012–2015	Succeeded by Dave Tollner
Preceded by New portfolio	Minister for Land Resource Management; 2012–2016	Succeeded by Gary Higgins
Preceded by Rob Knight	Minister for Essential Services; 2012–2016	Succeeded by Peter Chandler
Preceded by John Elferink	Minister for Public Employment; 2015–2016	Succeeded by Peter Styles
