= Attorney-General of the Northern Territory =

Chief government lawyer of Australia's northernmost jurisdiction

- Coat of arms of the Northern Territory

- Flag of the Northern Territory
- Incumbent; Marie-Clare Boothby since 9 September 2024
- Department of the Attorney-General and Justice
- Style: The Honourable
- Member of: Parliament; Cabinet; Executive Council
- Reports to: Chief Minister of the Northern Territory
- Seat: Darwin, Northern Territory
- Nominator: Chief Minister of the Northern Territory
- Appointer: Administrator of the Northern Territory; on the advice of the chief minister
- Term length: At the Administrator's pleasure
- Formation: 1978
- First holder: Paul Everingham
- Website: www.justice.nt.gov.au

The Attorney-General of the Northern Territory, or simply the Attorney-General, is the primary Law Officer of the Crown in the Northern Territory. The Attorney-General serves as the legal and constitutional adviser to the Government of the Northern Territory and administers their portfolio through the Department of the Attorney-General and Justice.

Marie-Clare Boothby is the current Attorney-General, having been sworn in on 9 September 2024.

== List of Northern Territory Attorneys-General ==
Attorney-General	Party	Term
Paul Everingham	Country Liberal Party	1978–1982
Jim Robertson	Country Liberal Party	1982–1984
Marshall Perron	Country Liberal Party	1984–1986
Daryl Manzie	Country Liberal Party	1986–1992
Shane Stone	Country Liberal Party	1992–1993
Daryl Manzie	Country Liberal Party	1993–1994
Fred Finch	Country Liberal Party	1994–1995
Stephen Hatton	Country Liberal Party	1995–1996
Denis Burke	Country Liberal Party	1996–1997
Shane Stone	Country Liberal Party	1997–1999
Denis Burke	Country Liberal Party	1999–2001
Peter Toyne	Australian Labor Party	2001–2006
Syd Stirling	Australian Labor Party	2006–2007
Paul Henderson	Australian Labor Party	2007
Chris Burns	Australian Labor Party	2007–2009
Marion Scrymgour [1st female]	Australian Labor Party	2009
Delia Lawrie	Australian Labor Party	2009–2011
Rob Knight	Australian Labor Party	2011–2012
John Elferink	Country Liberal Party	2012–2016
Natasha Fyles	Australian Labor Party	2016–2020
Selena Uibo	Australian Labor Party	2020–2022
Chansey Paech	Australian Labor Party	2022–2024
Marie-Clare Boothby	Country Liberal Party	2024-

== See also ==
- Government of Northern Territory
- Justice ministry
