= Robyn Lambley =

Australian politician (born 1965)

The Honourable Robyn Lambley MLA
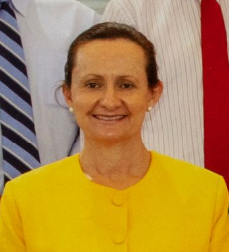
- Lambley in 2012

14th Speaker of the Northern Territory Legislative Assembly
- Incumbent
- Assumed office 15 October 2024
- Preceded by: Dheran Young

Deputy Chief Minister of the Northern Territory
- In office 29 August 2012 – 6 March 2013
- Preceded by: Delia Lawrie
- Succeeded by: Willem Westra van Holthe

Member of the Northern Territory Legislative Assembly for Araluen
- Incumbent
- Assumed office 9 October 2010
- Preceded by: Jodeen Carney

Personal details
- Born: 26 January 1965 (age 61) Grafton, New South Wales, Australia
- Party: Independent (2015–2020; 2020–)
- Other political affiliations: Territory Alliance (2020); Country Liberal Party (until 2015)
- Spouse: Craig Lambley
- Occupation: Social worker

Robyn Jane Lambley (born 26 January 1965) is an Australian politician. She is an independent member representing the division of Araluen in the Northern Territory Legislative Assembly, having been first elected in a 2010 by-election as a member of the Country Liberal Party. She resigned from the party and contested Araluen as an independent in 2016. She was a member of the Territory Alliance between March and October 2020.

Between August 2012 and March 2013, Lambley served as the Deputy Chief Minister of the Northern Territory and Treasurer of the Northern Territory in the Mills Ministry.

== Early life ==
Lambley was born in Grafton, New South Wales, and moved to Alice Springs in 1993 where she was in charge of the hospital's Social Work Department and Aboriginal Liaison and Interpreting Service. In 2000, she and her husband opened the Mad Harry's retail store. In addition to running the business and raising two children, Lambley served as a councillor on the Alice Springs Town Council, and was deputy mayor of Alice Springs from 2006 to 2007.

== Politics ==
Northern Territory Legislative Assembly
Years	Term	Electoral division	Party
2010–2012	11th	Araluen	Country Liberal
2012–2015	12th	Araluen	Country Liberal
2015–2016	Changed allegiance to:		Independent
2016–2020	13th	Araluen	Independent
2020	Changed allegiance to:		Territory Alliance
2020	14th	Araluen	Territory Alliance
2020–present	Changed allegiance to:		Independent

Lambley was preselected by the Country Liberal Party (CLP) to contest the 2010 Araluen by-election following the resignation of Jodeen Carney, winning the by-election with 68.04% of votes cast.

Following the Country Liberal Party's victory in the 2012 territory election, the CLP voted Lambley deputy leader of the party (and Deputy Chief Minister to Terry Mills), replacing Kezia Purick who had been deputy leader prior to the election. She and Mills were initially sworn in as a two-person government, pending the full ministry's swearing-in on 3 September. At that time, among other portfolios, Lambley became Treasurer.

Lambley resigned as the Deputy Chief Minister on 5 March 2013, but stayed on as Treasurer. In a March cabinet reshuffle, Lambley became Minister for Health, a post she retained when Mills was ousted in favour of Adam Giles.

Lambley was sacked from cabinet in February 2015 for helping Willem Westra van Holthe and John Elferink line up support for their attempted party-room coup against Giles. She resigned from the CLP on 17 June 2015 after the release of a proposed redistribution of electoral boundaries that would see her seat of Araluen dismantled. A revised map later saw Araluen retained.

Lambley contested Araluen as an independent in the 2016 Territory election. On the primary vote, she finished just a few hundred votes ahead of her replacement as CLP candidate, Stephen Brown. However, she easily defeated Brown on Labor preferences, taking 58 percent of the two-party vote.

Lambley often communicates with voters in her district with 'drive thru chats', where she sits by the side of the road and waits for people to pull over and discuss local issues within her community.

On 18 March 2020, Lambley joined the Territory Alliance party founded by former chief minister Terry Mills. She also became deputy leader of Territory Alliance, once again becoming Mills' deputy as she had been Deputy Chief Minister to Mills in the previous CLP government.

Lambley was the only member of Territory Alliance to be re-elected in the 2020 general election, narrowly retaining her seat despite an 8.1% swing against her. In October 2020, Lambley confirmed she had resigned from the party and would once again represent Araluen as an independent. She became Speaker of the Assembly after the CLP won power in 2024.

Northern Territory Legislative Assembly
Preceded by Jodeen Carney	Member for Araluen; 2010–present	Incumbent
Preceded by Dheran Young	Speaker of the Northern Territory Legislative Assembly; 2024–present	Incumbent
Political offices
Preceded by Delia Lawrie	Deputy Chief Minister of the Northern Territory; 2012–2013	Succeeded by Willem Westra van Holthe
Preceded by Delia Lawrie	Treasurer of the Northern Territory; 2012–2013	Succeeded by John Elferink
Party political offices
Preceded by Kezia Purick	Deputy Leader of the Country Liberal Party; 2012–2013	Succeeded by Willem Westra van Holthe
