= Peter Chandler (politician) =

Australian politician (born 1965)

The Honourable Peter Chandler
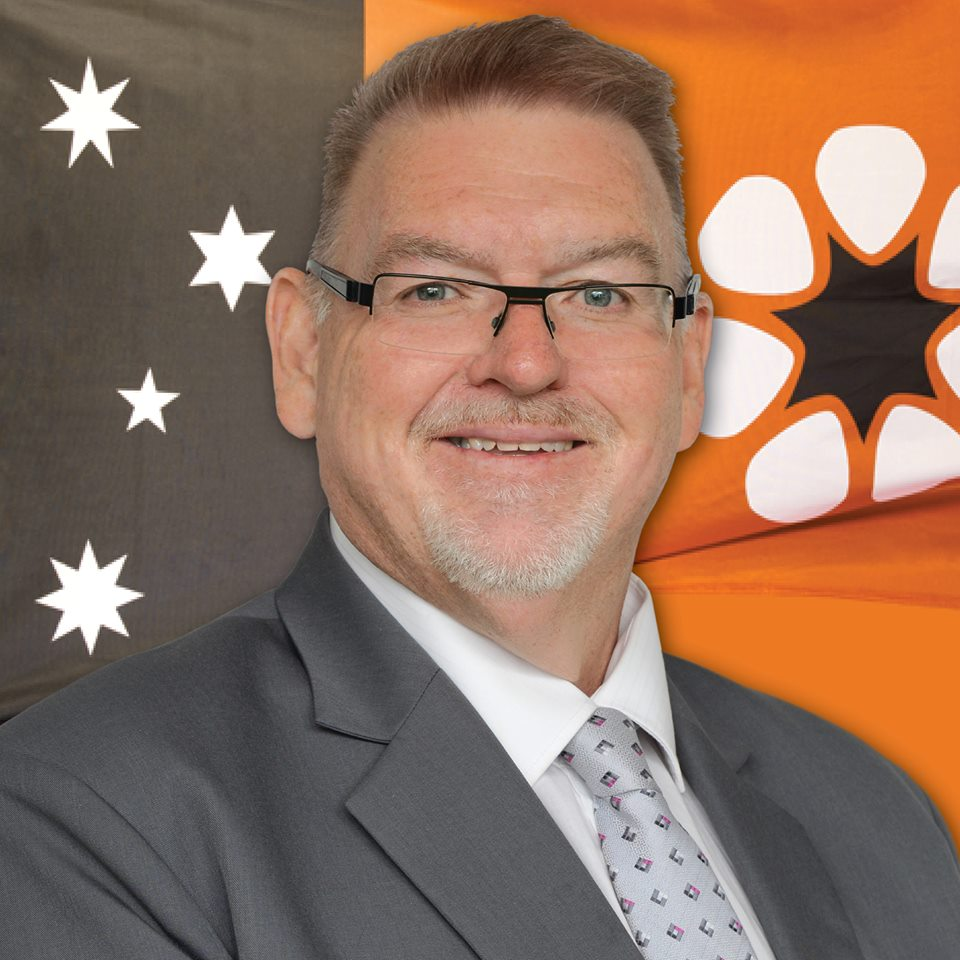

Member of the Northern Territory Parliament for Brennan
- In office 9 August 2008 – 27 August 2016
- Preceded by: James Burke
- Succeeded by: Tony Sievers

Personal details
- Born: Peter Glen Chandler; 18 July 1965 (age 61) Swan Hill, Victoria, Australia
- Party: Federation (since 2019)
- Other political affiliations: Country Liberal (until 2019)
- Occupation: Public servant

Military service
- Allegiance: Australia
- Branch/service: Royal Australian Air Force
- Years of service: 1985–1991

Peter Glen Chandler (born 18 July 1965) is an Australian politician. He was a Country Liberal Party member of the Northern Territory Legislative Assembly, and held the seat of Brennan from 2008 to 2016. He was Deputy Chief Minister from 2014 to 2015 and a minister under both Terry Mills and Adam Giles. He lost his seat at the 2016 general election. Chandler lives in Palmerston with his wife, Robyn, and four children.

== Early life ==
Chandler was born in Swan Hill, Victoria, and was educated at Warialda High School in New South Wales. He joined the Royal Australian Air Force in 1985 in Queensland, and later transferred to the Northern Territory where he worked as a dog handler for the RAAF, and later worked for the City of Darwin. He also worked as a public servant for the Australian Bureau of Statistics and Defence Housing Australia.

== Political career ==
Northern Territory Legislative Assembly
Years	Term	Electoral division	Party
2008–2012	11th	Brennan	Country Liberal
2012–2016	12th	Brennan	Country Liberal

Chandler was elected to the Northern Territory Legislative Assembly at the 2008 NT election on 9 August, representing the seat of Brennan for the Country Liberal Party (CLP). He was Shadow Minister for Natural Resources, Environment, and Heritage; Parks and Wildlife in Terry Mills' shadow cabinet, and took on several ministerial portfolios in the Mills Ministry when the CLP won government at the 2012 election.

On the Country Liberal Party's victory at the 2012 election, Chandler was appointed as a minister in the Mills Ministry in September 2012, and continued to serve as a minister in the Giles Ministry.

=== Other political positions held ===
- Minister for Business (2012–2013)
- Minister for Trade (2012–2013)
- Minister for Economic Development (2012–2013)
- Minister for Employment and Training (2012–2013)
- Minister for Housing (2012–2013)
- Minister for Lands, Planning and the Environment (2013–2014)
- Minister for Education (2013–2014, 2015–2016)
- Minister for Lands and Planning (2014–2015)
- Minister for Police, Fire and Emergency Services (2014–2016)
- Minister for Defence Industries and Veterans Support (2014–2015)
- Minister for Transport (2015–2016)
- Minister for Infrastructure (2015–2016)
- Minister for Veterans Support (2015–2016)
- Minister for Essential Services (2016).

=== Fourth deputy chief minister ===
Deputy Chief Minister Dave Tollner was asked to resign from his position in August 2014. However, following a threat to move to the crossbench unless he was reinstated by Tollner, Chief Minister Adam Giles opened the leadership and deputy leadership to a party room ballot on September 1. Giles was re-elected as CLP leader, and Chandler was voted in as the fourth deputy chief minister of the CLP government.

However, in February 2015, in the fallout from an unsuccessful leadership challenge against Giles from Willem Westra van Holthe, Chandler was replaced as Deputy Chief Minister by Westra van Holthe.

=== 2016 general election ===
Chandler lost his seat in his party's landslide defeat 2016 election. He stated:

"I was resolute that we would probably lose government, given the feedback from the community, I certainly didn't think I would lose my seat".

He raised concerns about what he would do now that defeated MPs were no longer entitled to a parliamentary pension, stating:

"I look at history and I know that there are many former members of parliament who've actually had to leave town...I've got a family to feed, a family to support so I'll be looking for employment opportunities."

He was highly critical of Giles' leadership and role in the party's defeat.

Northern Territory Legislative Assembly
Preceded by James Burke	Member for Brennan; 2008–2016	Succeeded by Tony Sievers
Political offices
Preceded by Dave Tollner	Deputy Chief Minister of the Northern Territory; 2014–2015	Succeeded by Willem Westra van Holthe
