= Chris Burns (politician) =

Australian politician

Christopher Bruce Burns (born 12 August 1949) is a former Australian politician. He was a Labor member of the Northern Territory Legislative Assembly. He had held his seat of Johnston since its creation at the 2001 election on 18 August 2001. He became a Minister in November 2002 and held a number of portfolios. From September 2010, he was Minister for Education and Training, Minister for Public and Affordable Housing, and Minister for Public Employment. Burns was also Leader of Government Business in the Legislative Assembly.

Northern Territory Legislative Assembly
Years	Term	Electoral division	Party
2001–2005	9th	Johnston	Labor
2005–2008	10th	Johnston	Labor
2008–2012	11th	Johnston	Labor

Burns retired at the 2012 NT general election on 25 August 2012.

He is married with three children.

Northern Territory Legislative Assembly
Division created	Member for Johnston; 2001–2012	Succeeded by Ken Vowles
