= Mike Reed (politician) =

Australian politician (1945–2020)

Michael Anthony Reed AM (2 June 1945 – 24 November 2020) was an Australian politician.

== Career ==
Northern Territory Legislative Assembly
Years	Term	Electoral division	Party
1987–1990	5th	Katherine	Country Liberal
1990–1994	6th	Katherine	Country Liberal
1994–1997	7th	Katherine	Country Liberal
1997–2001	8th	Katherine	Country Liberal
2001–2003	9th	Katherine	Country Liberal

He was the Country Liberal Party member for Katherine in the Northern Territory Legislative Assembly from 1987 to 2003. He was Deputy Chief Minister in the governments of Shane Stone and Denis Burke; following the CLP's election loss in 2001, he resigned in 2003.

Reed was made a Member of the Order of Australia (AM) in the 2005 Australia Day Honours for "service to the Northern Territory Parliament and to the community of Katherine".

Reed died aged 75 on 24 November 2020.

Northern Territory Legislative Assembly
New seat	Member for Katherine; 1987–2003	Succeeded by Fay Miller
