= Second Gunner ministry =

Cabinet of Northern Territory, Australia, 2020–2022

- 11th Cabinet of the Northern Territory

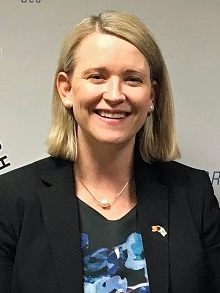
- Michael Gunner (Chief Minister) Nicole Manison (Deputy Chief Minister)
- Date formed: 7 September 2020
- Date dissolved: 13 May 2022

People and organisations
- Monarch: Elizabeth II
- Governor: Vicki O'Halloran
- Chief Minister: Michael Gunner
- Deputy Chief Minister: Nicole Manison
- Total no. of members: 9
- Member party: Labor
- Status in legislature: Majority government 14 / 25
- Opposition party: Country Liberal
- Opposition leader: Lia Finocchiaro

History
- Election: 2020 Northern Territory general election
- Legislature term: 14th
- Predecessor: First Gunner ministry
- Successor: Fyles ministry

The Second Gunner ministry was the second ministry of the 11th Chief Minister of the Northern Territory, Michael Gunner. It came into operation on 7 September 2020, succeeding the First Gunner ministry, and ended on 13 May 2022, following the resignation of Chief Minister Gunner, it was succeeded by the Fyles ministry.

== First arrangement ==
The first arrangement of Gunner's second ministry was announced on 7 September 2020, following the 2020 Northern Territory general election. This was the only arrangement during his term.

Portfolio	Minister
Hon Michael Gunner, MLA	Chief Minister; Treasurer; Minister for Major Projects and Territory Economic Reconstruction; Minister for Strategic Defence Relations
Hon Nicole Manison, MLA	Deputy Chief Minister; Minister for Police, Fire and Emergency Services; Minister for Mining and Industry; Minister for Northern Australia and Trade; Minister for Defence Industries; Minister for Agribusiness and Aquaculture; Minister for International Education
Hon Natasha Fyles, MLA	Leader of Government Business; Minister for Health; Minister for Tourism and Hospitality; Minister for Racing, Gaming and Licensing; Minister for Alcohol Policy; Minister for Major Events; Minister for National Resilience
Hon Eva Lawler, MLA	Minister for Infrastructure, Planning and Logistics; Minister for Renewables and Energy; Minister for Environment; Minister for Water Security; Minister for Climate Change; Minister for Essential Services
Hon Lauren Moss, MLA	Minister for Education; Minister for Children; Minister for Youth; Minister for Seniors; Minister for Women
Hon Selena Uibo, MLA	Attorney-General and Minister for Justice; Minister for Aboriginal Affairs; Minister for Treaty and Local Decision Making; Minister for Parks and Rangers
Hon Paul Kirby, MLA	Minister for Small Business; Minister for Jobs and Training; Minister for Corporate and Digital Development; Minister for Public Employment; Minister for Veterans Affairs; Minister for Recreational Fishing
Hon Kate Worden, MLA	Minister for Territory Families and Urban Housing; Minister for Disabilities; Minister for Sport; Minister for Multicultural Affairs
Hon Chansey Paech, MLA	Minister for Local Government; Minister for Central Australia Economic Reconstruction; Minister for Remote Housing and Town Camps; Minister for Indigenous Essential Services; Minister for Arts and Culture
