= Fyles ministry =

Cabinet of Northern Territory, Australia, 2022–2023

- 12th Cabinet of the Northern Territory
- Incumbent
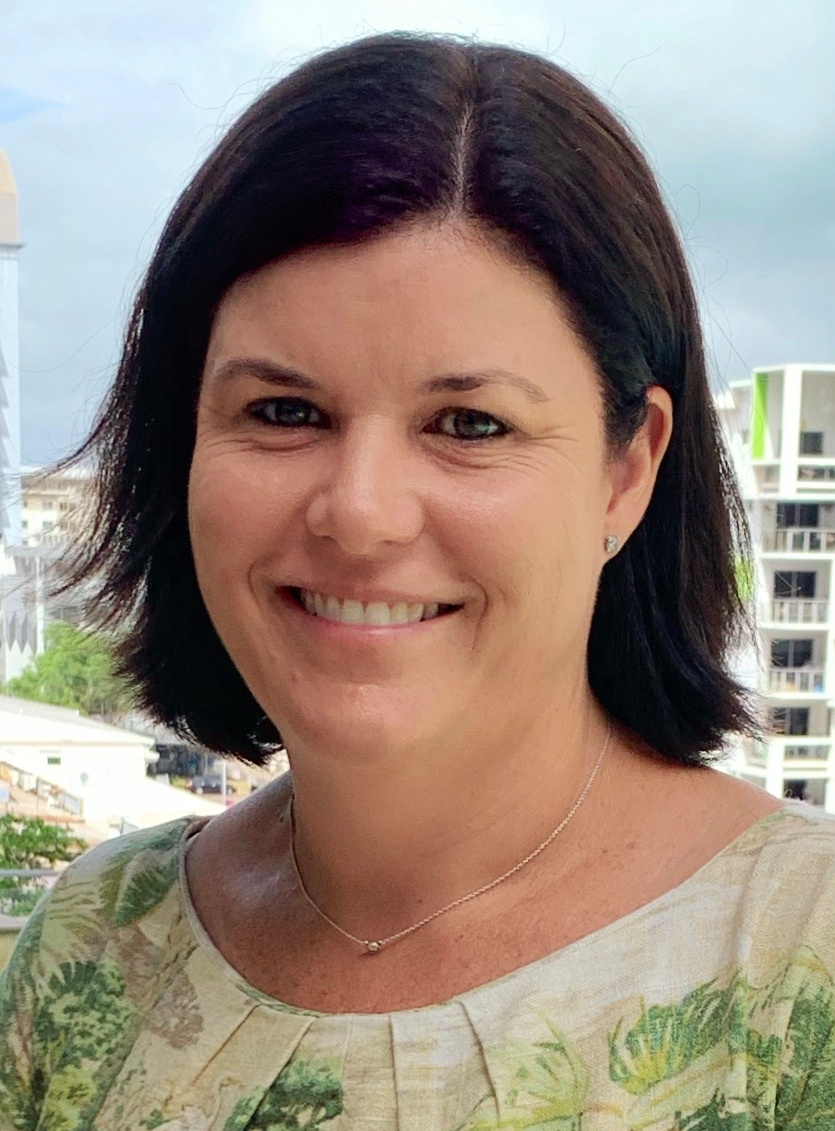
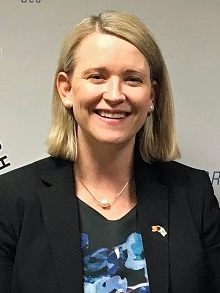
- Natasha Fyles (Chief Minister) Nicole Manison (Deputy Chief Minister)
- Date formed: 13 May 2022
- Date dissolved: 21 December 2023

People and organisations
- Monarch: Elizabeth II (until 8 September 2022); Charles III (from 8 September 2022)
- Governor: Vicki O'Halloran (until 30 January 2023); Hugh Heggie (from 2 February 2023)
- Chief Minister: Natasha Fyles
- Deputy Chief Minister: Nicole Manison
- Total no. of members: 9
- Member party: Labor
- Status in legislature: Majority government 14 / 25
- Opposition party: Country Liberal
- Opposition leader: Lia Finocchiaro

History
- Election: 2020 Northern Territory general election
- Legislature term: 14th
- Predecessor: Second Gunner ministry
- Successor: Lawler ministry

The Fyles ministry was the ministry of the 12th Chief Minister of the Northern Territory, Natasha Fyles. It came into operation on 13 May 2022 succeeding the second Gunner ministry. It was dissolved on 21 December 2023 and replaced by the Lawler ministry.

== Third ministry ==
The third ministry was sworn in on 30 October 2023, it saw long-term cabinet members Paul Kirby and Lauren Moss stripped of their portfolios to relatively new members, Brent Potter and Joel Bowden. Additionally, this minor reshuffle observed Kate Worden, lose the Minister for Police, Fire and Emergency Services portfolio to Brent Potter, the biggest change in the reshuffle.

Minister	Portfolio	Image
Natasha Fyles	Chief Minister; Minister for Health; Minister for Alcohol Policy; Minister for Major Projects; Minister for Defence; Minister for Major Events	
Nicole Manison	Deputy Chief Minister; Minister for Advanced Manufacturing; Minister for Mining and Industry; Minister for Northern Australia and Trade; Minister for Agribusiness and Fisheries	
Eva Lawler	Treasurer; Minister for Education; Minister for Territory Development	
Selena Uibo	Minister for Housing and Homelands; Minister for Renewables and Energy; Minister for Essential Services; Minister for Public Employment; Minister for Local Decision Making; Minister for Public Employment; Minister for Corporate and Digital Development; Minister for Parks and Ranges	
Brent Potter	Minister for Police, Fire and Emergency Services; Minister for Veterans' Affairs	
Kate Worden	Minister for Environment, Climate Change and Water Security; Minister for Mental Health; Minister for Prevention of Domestic and Family Violence; Minister for Sport	
Chansey Paech	Leader of Government Business; Attorney-General and Minister for Justice; Minister for Racing, Gaming and Licensing; Minister for Local Government; Minister for Arts, Culture and Heritage; Minister for Desert Knowledge Australia; Minister for Aboriginal affairs and Treaty	
Ngaree Ah Kit	Minister for Territory Families; Minister for Youth, Seniors and Equality; Minister for Disabilities; Minister for Multicultural Affairs	
Joel Bowden: Minister for Infrastructure, Planning and Logistics; Minister for Business and Jobs, Skills, Training and International Education; Minister for Minister for Tourism and Hospitality; Minister for Recreational fishing		

== First ministry (13 May 2022 – 23 May 2022) ==
The first ministry was sworn in on 13 May 2022, with ministers from the previous Gunner ministry retaining their roles for a week during the parliamentary sittings, before a reshuffle takes place. Fyles took on all of Gunner's previous roles in this interim arrangement. This ministry concluded on 23 May 2022.

Minister	Portfolio
Natasha Fyles	Chief Minister; Treasurer; Minister for Health; Minister for Major Projects; Minister for Strategic Defence Relations; Minister for Tourism and Hospitality; Minister for Racing, Gaming and Licensing; Minister for Alcohol Policy; Minister for Major Events; Minister for National Resilience
Nicole Manison	Deputy Chief Minister; Minister for Police, Fire and Emergency Services; Minister for Mining and Industry; Minister for Northern Australia and Trade; Minister for Defence Industries; Minister for Agribusiness and Aquaculture; Minister for International Education
Eva Lawler	Minister for Infrastructure, Planning and Logistics; Minister for Renewables and Energy; Minister for Environment; Minister for Water Security; Minister for Climate Change; Minister for Essential Services
Lauren Moss	Minister for Education; Minister for Children; Minister for Youth; Minister for Seniors; Minister for Women
Selena Uibo	Attorney-General and Minister for Justice; Minister for Aboriginal Affairs; Minister for Treaty and Local Decision Making; Minister for Parks and Rangers
Paul Kirby	Minister for Small Business; Minister for Jobs and Training; Minister for Corporate and Digital Development; Minister for Public Employment; Minister for Veterans Affairs; Minister for Recreational Fishing
Kate Worden	Minister for Territory Families and Urban Housing; Minister for Disabilities; Minister for Sport; Minister for Multicultural Affairs
Chansey Paech	Minister for Local Government; Minister for Central Australia Economic Reconstruction; Minister for Remote Housing and Town Camps; Minister for Indigenous Essential Services; Minister for Arts and Culture; Leader of Government Business

== Second ministry (23 May 2022 – 30 October 2023) ==
The second ministry was sworn in on 23 May 2022, with the Cabinet being extended to nine members, adding Ngaree Ah Kit. This ministry concluded on 30 October 2023.

Minister	Portfolio
Natasha Fyles	Chief Minister; Minister for Health; Minister for Alcohol Policy; Minister for Major Projects; Minister for Defence
Nicole Manison	Deputy Chief Minister; Minister for Tourism and Hospitality; Minister for Parks and Rangers; Minister for Advanced Manufacturing; Minister for Mining and Industry; Minister for Northern Australia and Trade
Eva Lawler	Treasurer; Minister for Education; Minister for Infrastructure, Planning and Logistics; Minister for Territory Development
Lauren Moss	Minister for Environment, Climate Change and Water Security; Minister for Mental Health and Suicide Prevention; Minister for Youth; Minister for Seniors
Selena Uibo	Minister for Housing and Homelands; Minister for Renewables and Energy; Minister for Essential Services; Minister for Aboriginal Affairs; Minister for Treaty and Local Decision Making
Paul Kirby	Minister for Business, Jobs and Training; Minister for Agribusiness and Fisheries; Minister for Public Employment; Minister for Major Events; Minister for Veterans' Affairs
Kate Worden	Minister for Police, Fire and Emergency Services; Minister for Territory Families; Minister for Prevention of Domestic and Family Violence; Minister for Sport
Chansey Paech	Attorney-General and Minister for Justice; Minister for Racing, Gaming and Licensing; Minister for Local Government; Minister for Arts, Culture and Heritage; Minister for Desert Knowledge Australia; Leader of Government Business
Ngaree Ah Kit	Minister for Corporate and Digital Development; Minister for International Education; Minister for Disabilities; Minister for Multicultural Affairs

== Third ministry (30 October 2023 – 21 December 2023) ==
The third ministry was sworn in on 30 October 2023, it saw long-term cabinet members Paul Kirby and Lauren Moss stripped of their portfolios to relatively new members, Brent Potter and Joel Bowden. Additionally, this minor reshuffle observed Kate Worden, lose the Minister for Police, Fire and Emergency Services portfolio to Brent Potter, the biggest change in the reshuffle. This is likely the Cabinet which Chief Minister Natasha Fyles will take with her into the 2024 Northern Territory general election.

Minister	Portfolio
Natasha Fyles	Chief Minister; Minister for Health; Minister for Alcohol Policy; Minister for Major Projects; Minister for Defence; Minister for Major Events
Nicole Manison	Deputy Chief Minister; Minister for Advanced Manufacturing; Minister for Mining and Industry; Minister for Northern Australia and Trade; Minister for Agribusiness and Fisheries
Eva Lawler	Treasurer; Minister for Education; Minister for Territory Development
Selena Uibo	Minister for Housing and Homelands; Minister for Renewables and Energy; Minister for Essential Services; Minister for Public Employment; Minister for Local Decision Making; Minister for Public Employment; Minister for Corporate and Digital Development; Minister for Parks and Ranges
Brent Potter	Minister for Police, Fire and Emergency Services; Minister for Veterans' Affairs
Kate Worden	Minister for Environment, Climate Change and Water Security; Minister for Mental Health; Minister for Prevention of Domestic and Family Violence; Minister for Sport
Chansey Paech	Leader of Government Business; Attorney-General and Minister for Justice; Minister for Racing, Gaming and Licensing; Minister for Local Government; Minister for Arts, Culture and Heritage; Minister for Desert Knowledge Australia; Minister for Aboriginal affairs and Treaty
Ngaree Ah Kit	Minister for Territory Families; Minister for Youth, Seniors and Equality; Minister for Disabilities; Minister for Multicultural Affairs
Joel Bowden	Minister for Infrastructure, Planning and Logistics; Minister for Business and Jobs, Skills, Training and International Education; Minister for Minister for Tourism and Hospitality; Minister for Recreational fishing
