= Lawler ministry =

Cabinet of Northern Territory, Australia, 2023–2024

- 13th Cabinet of the Northern Territory
- Incumbent
- Date formed: 21 December 2023
- Date dissolved: 28 August 2024

People and organisations
- Monarch: Charles III
- Governor: Hugh Heggie
- Chief Minister: Eva Lawler
- Deputy Chief Minister: Chansey Paech
- Total no. of members: 8
- Member party: Labor
- Status in legislature: Majority government 14 / 25
- Opposition party: Country Liberal
- Opposition leader: Lia Finocchiaro

History
- Legislature term: 14th
- Predecessor: Fyles
- Successor: Finocchiaro

The Lawler ministry was the cabinet of the 13th Chief Minister of the Northern Territory, Eva Lawler. It was sworn in on 21 December 2023 and succeeded the Fyles ministry.

== Current ministry ==
The ministry was sworn in on 21 December 2023 following the resignation of Natasha Fyles as chief minister on 20 December following the undisclosed share and conflict of interest scandal.

=== Current composition ===
Portrait	Minister	Portfolio	Took office	Left office	Duration of tenure	Electorate
	Eva Lawler MLA	Chief Minister; Treasurer; Minister for Territory Development; Minister for Defence Industries; Minister for Industry and Trade; Minister for Major Projects	21 December 2023	28 August 2024	251 days	Drysdale
	Chansey Paech MLA	Deputy Chief Minister; Leader of Government Business; Attorney General and Minister for Justice; Minister for Local Government; Minister for Aboriginal Affairs and Treaty; Minister for the Arts, Culture and Heritage	21 December 2023	28 August 2024	251 days	Gwoja
	Selena Uibo MLA	Minister for Health; Minister for Mental Health and Suicide Prevention; Minister for Remote Housing and Homelands; Minister for Parks and Rangers; Minister for Local Decision Making; Minister for Public Employment; Minister for Corporate and Digital Development	21 December 2023	28 August 2024	251 days	Arnhem
	Kate Worden MLA	Minister for the Environment, Climate Change and Water Security; Minister for Prevention of Domestic, Family and Sexual Violence; Minister for Sport; Minister for Renewables and Energy; Minister for Essential Services	21 December 2023	28 August 2024	251 days	Sanderson
	Ngaree Ah Kit MLA	Minister for Territory Families; Minister for Urban Housing; Minister for Youth, Seniors, and Equality; Minister for Multicultural Affairs; Minister for Disabilities	21 December 2023	28 August 2024	251 days	Karama
	Brent Potter MLA	Minister for Police; Minister for Alcohol Policy; Minister for Fire and Emergency Services; Minister for Veterans’ Affairs; Minister for Major Events	21 December 2023	28 August 2024	251 days	Fannie Bay
	Joel Bowden MLA	Minister of Infrastructure, Planning and Logistics; Minister for Business and Jobs; Minister for Skills, Training and International Education; Minister for Tourism and Hospitality; Minister for Recreational Fishing	21 December 2023	28 August 2024	251 days	Johnston
	Mark Monaghan MLA	Minister for Education; Minister for Mining; Minister for Agribusiness and Fisheries	21 December 2023	28 August 2024	251 days	Fong Lim
