= First Gunner ministry =

Cabinet of Northern Territory, Australia, 2016–2020

- 11th Cabinet of the Northern Territory

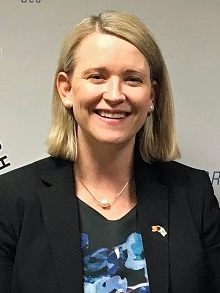
- Michael Gunner (Chief Minister) Nicole Manison (Deputy Chief Minister)
- Date formed: 31 August 2016
- Date dissolved: 7 September 2020

People and organisations
- Monarch: Elizabeth II
- Governor: John Hardy (until 30 October 2017); Vicki O'Halloran (from 31 October 2017)
- Chief Minister: Michael Gunner
- Deputy Chief Minister: Nicole Manison
- Total no. of members: 9
- Member party: Labor
- Status in legislature: Majority government 18 / 25
- Opposition party: Country Liberal
- Opposition leader: Lia Finocchiaro

History
- Election: 2016 Northern Territory general election
- Legislature term: 13th
- Predecessor: Giles ministry
- Successor: Second Gunner ministry

The First Gunner ministry was the first ministry of the 11th Chief Minister of the Northern Territory, Michael Gunner. It came into operation on 31 August 2016, succeeding the Giles Country Liberal ministry, and ended on 7 September 2020, succeeded by the Second Gunner Ministry.

== Initial arrangement ==
Although Territory Labor's landslide victory in the 2016 election was beyond doubt, a number of prospective ministers—including Labor deputy leader and presumptive Deputy Chief Minister Lynne Walker—had not been confirmed as winners in their seats. For this reason, Gunner had himself, Natasha Fyles, and Nicole Manison sworn in as an interim three-person government on 31 August 2016 until a full ministry could be named.

Minister	Office
Hon Michael Gunner, MLA	Minister for Police, Fire and Emergency Services; Minister for Tourism; Minister for Northern and Central Australia; Minister for Economic Development and Major Projects; Minister for Indigenous Affairs; Minister for Correctional Services; Minister for Business; Minister for Racing, Gaming and Licensing; Minister for Asian Engagement and Trade; Minister for Employment and Training; Minister for Public Employment; Minister for Corporate and Information Services; Minister for Multicultural Affairs; Minister for Defence Industries; Minister for Senior Territorians; Minister for Lands and Planning; Minister for Mines and Energy; Minister for Children and Families; Minister for Health; Minister for Disability Services; Minister for Mental Health Services; Minister for Education; Minister for Transport; Minister for Infrastructure; Minister for Essential Services; Minister for Veterans Support; Minister for Primary Industry and Fisheries; Minister for Land Resource Management; Minister for the Environment; Minister for Arts and Museums; Minister for Sport and Recreation; Minister for Young Territorians; Minister for Local Government and Community Services; Minister for Housing; Minister for Parks and Wildlife; Minister for Men's Policy; Minister for Women's Policy; Minister for Statehood
Hon Nicole Manison, MLA	Treasurer
Hon Natasha Fyles, MLA	Attorney-General and Minister for Justice

== First (full) arrangement ==
On 11 September, the following members were announced as ministers after a Labor Party caucus meeting. By this time, it had been confirmed that Walker had lost her own seat, so Gunner tapped Manison to become the new deputy leader of Territory Labor and hence Deputy Chief Minister. Gunner also announced that all backbench members of his large caucus will serve as junior ministers, at no extra cost to taxpayers. The new cabinet was sworn in the following day. Notably, it was majority-female; five of its eight members were women.

Portfolio	Minister
Hon Michael Gunner, MLA	Chief Minister; Minister for Police, Fire and Emergency Services; Minister for Aboriginal Affairs; Minister for Trade, Business and Innovation; Minister for Northern Australia
Hon Nicole Manison, MLA	Deputy Chief Minister; Treasurer; Minister for Infrastructure, Planning and Logistics; Minister for Children
Hon Natasha Fyles, MLA	Attorney-General and Minister for Justice; Minister for Health; Leader of Government Business
Hon Gerry McCarthy, MLA	Minister for Housing and Community Development; Minister for Essential Services; Minister for Public Employment
Hon Ken Vowles, MLA	Minister for Primary Industry and Resources
Hon Lauren Moss, MLA	Minister for Environment and Natural Resources; Minister for Tourism and Culture; Minister for Corporate Information Services
Hon Eva Lawler, MLA	Minister for Education
Hon Dale Wakefield, MLA	Minister for Territory Families

== Second arrangement ==
Gunner's second arrangement of his cabinet was announced and sworn in on 26 June 2018. Selena Uibo was promoted to the ministry as Minister for Education and Training.

Portfolio	Minister
Hon Michael Gunner, MLA	Chief Minister; Minister for Northern Australia; Minister for Trade and Major Projects; Minister for Treaty; Minister for Children
Hon Nicole Manison, MLA	Deputy Chief Minister; Treasurer; Minister for Police, Fire and Emergency Services; Minister for Business and Innovation
Hon Natasha Fyles, MLA	Attorney-General and Minister for Justice; Minister for Health; Leader of Government Business
Hon Gerry McCarthy, MLA	Minister for Housing and Community Development; Minister for Public Employment
Hon Ken Vowles, MLA	Minister for Primary Industry and Resources; Minister for Aboriginal Affairs; Minister for the Arafura Games
Hon Lauren Moss, MLA	Minister for Tourism and Culture; Minister for Corporate and Information Services
Hon Eva Lawler, MLA	Minister for Environment and Natural Resources; Minister for Infrastructure, Planning and Logistics
Hon Dale Wakefield, MLA	Minister for Territory Families; Minister for Renewables and Essential Services
Hon Selena Uibo, MLA	Minister for Education; Minister for Training

== Final arrangement ==
The third arrangement of Gunner's Cabinet, occurring on 21 December 2018, saw Ken Vowles being expelled from the Cabinet for "breaking cabinet confidentiality". Assistant ministers Jeff Collins and Scott McConnell losing their roles and Paul Kirby joining the ministry as Minister for Primary Industry and Resources.

Portfolio	Minister
Hon Michael Gunner, MLA	Chief Minister; Minister for Northern Australia; Minister for Trade and Major Projects; Minister for Business and Innovation; Minister for Defence Jobs and Veterans Affairs; Minister for Treaty; Minister for Children
Hon Nicole Manison, MLA	Deputy Chief Minister; Treasurer; Minister for Police, Fire and Emergency Services; Minister for Multicultural Affairs
Hon Natasha Fyles, MLA	Attorney-General and Minister for Justice; Minister for Health; Minister for Disabilities; Minister for the Arafura Games; Leader of Government Business
Hon Gerry McCarthy, MLA	Minister for Housing and Community Development; Minister for Public Employment
Hon Lauren Moss, MLA	Minister for Tourism and Culture; Minister for Corporate and Information Services
Hon Eva Lawler, MLA	Minister for Environment and Natural Resources; Minister for Infrastructure, Planning and Logistics; Minister for Climate Change
Hon Dale Wakefield, MLA	Minister for Territory Families; Minister for Renewables and Essential Services
Hon Selena Uibo, MLA	Minister for Education; Minister for Aboriginal Affairs; Minister for Workplace Training
Hon Paul Kirby, MLA	Minister for Primary Industry and Resources
