= List of female heads of government in Australia =

A total of sixteen women have served, or are serving, as the head of an Australian government. Of these, one has served as the prime minister of Australia, eight as the premier of a state and seven as the chief minister of a territory. Twenty women have also served, or are serving, as the deputy head of government in Australian states and territories; one has served as the deputy prime minister of the country, thirteen as the deputy premier of a state, and six as the deputy chief minister of a territory.

The first female head of government in Australia, was Rosemary Follett in 1989, who was the 1st Chief Minister of the Australian Capital Territory. Carmen Lawrence became the first female premier of a state in 1990, by serving as the 25th Premier of Western Australia. In 2010, Julia Gillard became the first, and to date, only female prime minister of Australia.

Today, every Australian state and territory has had at least one female head of government, except for South Australia; the Northern Territory has had the most, with four; the Australian Capital Territory has had three; Queensland, New South Wales, and Victoria have each had a second female head of government serving in their respective jurisdiction. The most female heads to serve concurrently was four, during the 315 days between 16 May 2011 and 26 March 2012. Annastacia Palaszczuk, who served as the 39th Premier of Queensland from 2015 to 2023, had the longest tenure of any female head of government in Australia. The shortest tenure belongs to Eva Lawler, who served as the 13th Chief Minister of the Northern Territory from December 2023 to August 2024.

There is currently one serving female head of government in Australia: Lia Finocchiaro (14th Chief Minister of the Northern Territory) who was appointed on 28 August 2024. In addition, four women currently serve as deputy heads of government in Australia; Prue Car (Deputy Premier of New South Wales) since 28 March 2023; Rita Saffioti (Deputy Premier of Western Australia) since 8 June 2023; Rachel Stephen-Smith (Deputy Chief Minister of the Australian Capital Territory) since 23 July 2026 and Gabrielle Williams (Deputy Premier of Victoria) since 28 July 2026

== Female heads of government ==
=== Heads ===
Portrait	Title	Name (birth–death)	State or territory	Term start	Term end	Elections	Duration	Party	Notes
	Chief Minister	Rosemary Follett (b. 1948)	Australian Capital Territory	11 May 1989	5 December 1989	1989; 1992; 1995	4 years, 122 days	Labor	(Note: Elected 1st Chief Minister of the Australian Capital Territory in May 1989, after her party formed government following the inaugural general election in March 1989. Defeated in a vote-of-no-confidence in December 1989, to Trevor Kaine. Returned to power in June 1991, following a vote-of-no-confidence against Kaine. Led Labor to victory at the 1992 general election. Defeated by the Liberals under Kate Carnell at the general election in February 1995. First woman to become Chief Minister of a Territory of the Commonwealth of Australia. Only female government head to serve non-consecutive terms.)
	Chief Minister	Rosemary Follett (b. 1948)	Australian Capital Territory	6 June 1991	2 March 1995	1989; 1992; 1995	4 years, 122 days	Labor	
	Premier	Carmen Lawrence (b. 1948)	Western Australia	12 February 1990	16 February 1993	1993	3 years, 4 days	Labor	(Note: Appointed 25th Premier of Western Australia in February 1990, following the resignation of Peter Dowding. Defeated at the state election in February 1993, by Richard Court (Liberal). First woman to become Premier of Western Australia, and hence, of a State within the Commonwealth of Australia.)
	Premier	Joan Kirner (1938–2015)	Victoria	10 August 1990	6 October 1992	1992	2 years, 57 days	Labor	(Note: Appointed 42nd Premier of Victoria in August 1990, following the resignation of John Cain II. Defeated at the state election in October 1992, by Jeff Kennett (Liberal). First woman Premier of Victoria.)
	Chief Minister	Kate Carnell (b. 1955)	Australian Capital Territory	2 March 1995	18 October 2000	1995; 1998	5 years, 230 days	Liberal	(Note: Elected 3rd Chief Minister of the Australian Capital Territory in March 1995, after defeating Labor under Rosemary Follett at the general election. Led the Liberals to victory at the 1998 general election. Resigned in October 2000.)
	Chief Minister	Clare Martin (b. 1952)	Northern Territory	18 August 2001	26 November 2007	2001; 2005	6 years, 100 days	Labor	(Note: Elected 7th Chief Minister of the Northern Territory in August 2001, after defeating the Country Liberal Party under Denis Burke at the general election. Led Labor to victory at the 2005 general election. Resigned in November 2007. First woman Chief Minister of the Northern Territory.)
	Premier	Anna Bligh (b. 1960)	Queensland	13 September 2007	26 March 2012	2009; 2012	4 years, 195 days	Labor	(Note: Appointed 37th Premier of Queensland in September 2007, following the retirement of Peter Beattie. Led Labor to victory at the 2009 state election. Defeated at the state election in March 2012, by Campbell Newman (Liberal). First woman Premier of Queensland.)
	Premier	Kristina Keneally (b. 1968)	New South Wales	4 December 2009	28 March 2011	2011	1 year, 114 days	Labor	(Note: Appointed 42nd Premier of New South Wales in December 2009, following a Labor Party leadership challenge against Nathan Rees. Defeated at the state election in March 2011, by Barry O'Farrell (Liberal). First woman Premier of New South Wales.)
	Prime Minister	Julia Gillard (b. 1961)	Australia (Federal)	24 June 2010	27 June 2013	2010	3 years, 3 days	Labor	(Note: Appointed 27th Prime Minister of Australia in June 2010, following a Labor Party leadership challenge against Kevin Rudd. Led Labor to victory at the 2010 federal election. Defeated in a leadership challenge by Rudd, in June 2013. First, and to date, only woman Prime Minister of Australia.)
	Premier	Lara Giddings (b. 1972)	Tasmania	24 January 2011	31 March 2014	2014	3 years, 66 days	Labor	(Note: Appointed 44th Premier of Tasmania in January 2011, following the resignation of David Bartlett. Defeated at the state election, in March 2014. First, and to date, only woman Premier of Tasmania.)
	Chief Minister	Katy Gallagher (b. 1970)	Australian Capital Territory	16 May 2011	11 December 2014	2012	3 years, 209 days	Labor	(Note: Appointed 6th Chief Minister of the Australian Capital Territory in May 2011, following the resignation of Jon Stanhope. Led Labor to victory at the 2012 general election. Resigned in December 2014.)
	Premier	Annastacia Palaszczuk (b. 1969)	Queensland	14 February 2015	15 December 2023	2015; 2017; 2020	8 years, 304 days	Labor	(Note: Elected 39th Premier of Queensland in February 2015, after defeating the Liberals under Campbell Newman at the state election. Led Labor to victory at the 2017 state election and the 2020 state election. Resigned in December 2023. Only woman head of government to win three elections.)
	Premier	Gladys Berejiklian (b. 1970)	New South Wales	23 January 2017	5 October 2021	2019	4 years, 255 days	Liberal	(Note: Appointed 45th Premier of New South Wales in January 2017, following the resignation of Mike Baird. Led the Liberals to victory at the 2019 state election. Resigned in October 2021.)
	Chief Minister	Natasha Fyles (b. 1978)	Northern Territory	13 May 2022	21 December 2023	—	1 year, 222 days	Labor	(Note: Appointed 12th Chief Minister of the Northern Territory on 13 May 2022, after the resignation of Michael Gunner. Resigned in December 2023.)
	Premier	Jacinta Allan (b. 1973)	Victoria	27 September 2023	28 July 2026	—	2 years, 304 days	Labor	(Note: Appointed 49th Premier of Victoria on 27 September 2023, after the resignation of Daniel Andrews.)
	Chief Minister	Eva Lawler	Northern Territory	21 December 2023	28 August 2024	2024	251 days	Labor	(Note: Appointed 13th Chief Minister of the Northern Territory on 21 December 2023, after the resignation of Natasha Fyles. Defeated by the Country Liberals under Lia Finocchiaro at the general election in August 2024.)
	Chief Minister	Lia Finocchiaro (b. 1984)	Northern Territory	28 August 2024	Incumbent	2024	2 years, 82 days	Country Liberal	(Note: Elected 14th Chief Minister of the Northern Territory in August 2024, after defeating Labor under Eva Lawler at the general election.)

=== Deputy heads ===
Name	State/ territory	Party	Head of government	Term start	Term end	Duration
Joan Kirner	Victoria	Labor	John Cain II	7 February 1989	10 August 1990	1 year, 184 days
Joan Sheldon	Queensland	Liberal	Rob Borbidge	19 February 1996	26 June 1998	2 years, 127 days
Sue Napier	Tasmania	Liberal	Tony Rundle	18 March 1996	14 September 1998	2 years, 180 days
Anna Bligh	Queensland	Labor	Peter Beattie	28 July 2005	13 September 2007	2 years, 47 days
Katy Gallagher	Australian Capital Territory	Labor	Jon Stanhope	20 April 2006	16 May 2011	5 years, 26 days
Marion Scrymgour	Northern Territory	Labor	Paul Henderson	26 November 2007	8 February 2009	1 year, 74 days
Julia Gillard	Australia	Labor	Kevin Rudd	3 December 2007	24 June 2010	2 years, 203 days
Lara Giddings	Tasmania	Labor	David Bartlett	26 May 2008	24 January 2011	2 years, 243 days
Carmel Tebbutt	New South Wales	Labor	Nathan Rees; Kristina Keneally	5 September 2008	28 March 2011	2 years, 204 days
Delia Lawrie	Northern Territory	Labor	Paul Henderson	9 February 2009	29 August 2012	3 years, 202 days
Robyn Lambley	Northern Territory	Country Liberal	Terry Mills	29 August 2012	6 April 2013	251 days
Jackie Trad	Queensland	Labor	Annastacia Palaszczuk	14 February 2015	10 May 2020	5 years, 86 days
Liza Harvey	Western Australia	Liberal	Colin Barnett	16 February 2016	17 March 2017	1 year, 29 days
Nicole Manison	Northern Territory	Labor	Michael Gunner; Natasha Fyles	12 September 2016	21 December 2023	7 years, 100 days
Yvette Berry	Australian Capital Territory	Labor	Andrew Barr	31 October 2016	23 July 2026	9 years, 265 days
Vickie Chapman	South Australia	Liberal	Steven Marshall	19 March 2018	22 November 2021	3 years, 248 days
Susan Close	South Australia	Labor	Peter Malinauskas	21 March 2022	18 September 2025	4 years, 242 days
Jacinta Allan	Victoria	Labor	Daniel Andrews	27 June 2022	27 September 2023	1 year, 92 days
Prue Car	New South Wales	Labor	Chris Minns	28 March 2023	Incumbent	3 years, 235 days
Rita Saffioti	Western Australia	Labor	Roger Cook	8 June 2023	Incumbent	3 years, 163 days
Rachel Stephen-Smith	Australian Capital Territory	Labor	Andrew Barr	23 July 2026	Incumbent	118 days
Gabrielle Williams	Victoria	Labor	Ben Carroll	28 July 2026	Incumbent	113 days

== Female opposition leaders ==
Portrait	Name (birth–death)	State or territory	Term start	Term end	Elections	Duration	Party	Notes
	Rosemary Follett (b. 1948)	Australian Capital Territory	5 December 1989	6 June 1991		1 year, 183 days	Labor	
	Joan Kirner (1938–2015)	Victoria	6 October 1992	22 March 1993		167 days	Labor	
	Carmen Lawrence (b. 1948)	Western Australia	16 February 1993	7 February 1994		356 days	Labor	(Note: Resigned in order to enter federal politics at the 1994 Fremantle by-election.)
	Kate Carnell (b. 1955)	Australian Capital Territory	21 April 1993	9 March 1995	1995	1 year, 322 days	Liberal	
	Rosemary Follett (b. 1948)	Australian Capital Territory	9 March 1995	5 March 1996		362 days	Labor	
	Maggie Hickey (b. 1946)	Northern Territory	16 April 1996	2 February 1999	1997	2 years, 292 days	Labor	
	Kerry Chikarovski (b. 1956)	New South Wales	8 December 1998	28 March 2002	1999	3 years, 110 days	Liberal	(Note: Challenged for the leadership by John Brogden, lost by one vote.)
	Clare Martin (b. 1952)	Northern Territory	2 February 1999	27 August 2001	2001	2 years, 206 days	Labor	
	Sue Napier (1948–2010)	Tasmania	2 July 1999	20 August 2001		2 years, 49 days	Liberal	(Note: Challenged for the leadership by Bob Cheek.)
	Jodeen Carney (b. 1965)	Northern Territory	18 June 2005	29 January 2008		2 years, 225 days	Country Liberal	(Note: Challenged for the leadership by Terry Mills. Resigned in favour of Mills after vote was tied.)
	Isobel Redmond (b. 1953)	South Australia	8 July 2009	31 January 2013	2010	3 years, 207 days	Liberal	
	Annastacia Palaszczuk (b. 1969)	Queensland	28 March 2012	14 February 2015	2015	2 years, 323 days	Labor	
	Delia Lawrie (b. 1966)	Northern Territory	29 August 2012	20 April 2015		2 years, 234 days	Labor	(Note: Resigned as leader following a successful spill motion.)
	Rebecca White (b. 1983)	Tasmania	17 March 2017	15 May 2021	2018; 2021	4 years, 59 days	Labor	(Note: Resigned as leader following electoral defeat.)
	Rebecca White (b. 1983)	Tasmania	7 July 2021	10 April 2024	2024	2 years, 278 days	Labor	(Note: Resigned as leader following electoral defeat.)
	Deb Frecklington (b. 1971)	Queensland	12 December 2017	12 November 2020	2020	2 years, 336 days	Liberal National	(Note: Resigned as leader following electoral defeat.)
	Liza Harvey (b. 1966)	Western Australia	13 June 2019	24 November 2020		1 year, 194 days	Liberal	
	Jodi McKay (b. 1969)	New South Wales	29 June 2019	28 May 2021		1 year, 333 days	Labor	
	Lia Finocchiaro (b. 1984)	Northern Territory	1 February 2020	28 August 2024	2024	6 years, 290 days	Country Liberal	
	Elizabeth Lee (b. 1979)	Australian Capital Territory	27 October 2020	31 October 2024		4 years, 4 days	Liberal	
	Mia Davies (b. 1978)	Western Australia	14 April 2021	30 January 2023		1 year, 291 days	National	
	Leanne Castley (b. 1974)	Australian Capital Territory	31 October 2024	10 November 2025		2 years, 18 days	Liberal	
	Jess Wilson (b. 1990)	Victoria	18 November 2025	Incumbent		1 year, 0 days	Liberal	
	Kellie Sloane (b. 1973)	New South Wales	21 November 2025	Incumbent		362 days	Liberal	
	Ashton Hurn (b. 1991)	South Australia	8 December 2025	Incumbent		345 days	Liberal	

== Timeline ==
=== Heads ===
Red represents members of the Australian Labor Party, blue represents members of the Liberal Party of Australia and orange represents the Country Liberal Party.

=== Deputy heads ===
Red represents members of the Australian Labor Party, blue represents members of the Liberal Party of Australia and orange represents the Country Liberal Party.

== See also ==
- Women and government in Australia
- List of elected and appointed female heads of state and government
- List of female first ministers in Canada
- List of female governors in the United States
