= Minister for Child Protection =

Minister for Children
- Incumbent; Nicole Manison since 12 September 2016
- None
- Style: The Honourable
- Appointer: Administrator of the Northern Territory

The Northern Territory Minister for Children is a Minister of the Crown in the Government of the Northern Territory.

The current minister is Nicole Manison (Labor). She was sworn in on 12 September 2016 following the Labor victory at the 2016 election. It is an entirely new position concerned with "whole of government children's policy", while specific areas of child-related policy lie with the Minister for Territory Families.

== List of ministers for children ==
Minister	Party	Term	Ministerial title
Nicole Manison	Labor	12 September 2016 – present	Minister for Children
