= 2023 Territory Labor Party leadership election =

Australian Labor Party election

- 20 December 2023
- Leadership election
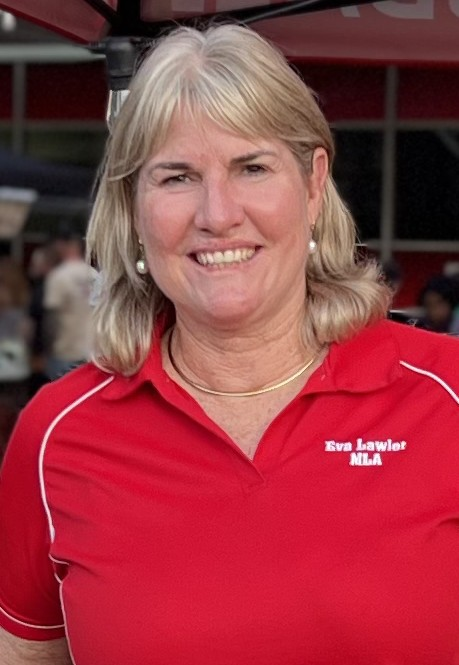
Candidate	Eva Lawler
Seat	Drysdale
Faction	Right
Caucus	Unopposed
Leader before election
Natasha Fyles
Elected Leader
Eva Lawler

The 2023 Territory Labor Party leadership election was held on 20 December 2023 to elect a new leader of the Territory Labor Party and ex officio, Chief Minister of the Northern Territory, following the resignation of Natasha Fyles as Chief Minister.

Eva Lawler was elected unopposed on 20 December. The only other declared candidate, Nicole Manison, chose to support Lawler and decided to move to the backbench following the election.

== See also ==
- 2024 Northern Territory general election
