= Minister for Aboriginal Affairs =

The title Aboriginal affairs minister or Minister for Aboriginal Affairs is the current or former title of a position in several governments, including:

== Australia ==
- Minister for Indigenous Affairs (Australia), a federal government minister, from 2019 known as the Minister for Indigenous Australians
  - Minister for Aboriginal Affairs (Northern Territory)
  - Minister for Aboriginal Affairs (South Australia)
  - Minister for Aboriginal Affairs (New South Wales)
  - Minister for Aboriginal Affairs (Victoria)
  - Minister for Aboriginal Affairs (Western Australia)

== Canada ==
- Minister of Indigenous and Northern Affairs (Canada)
