= Minister for Tourism and Hospitality =

Australian territory government position

Minister for Arts and Culture
- Department of Industry, Tourism and Trade
- Style: The Honourable
- Appointer: Administrator of the Northern Territory

The Northern Territory Minister for Arts and Culture is a Minister of the Crown in the Government of the Northern Territory, Australia. The minister administers their portfolio through the Department of Industry, Tourism and Trade.

The Minister is responsible for Aboriginal sacred sites, archives management, arts and cultural development, the Arts Grants Board, botanic gardens, the collection and preservation of natural and cultural heritage, community grants for recreation and sports associations, conservation and wildlife, film, television and new media, heritage conservation, the Indigenous Arts Reference Group, library and information services, major events, management of cultural facilities, management of territory parks and reserves, sport and recreation, sporting events, sporting facilities, tourism, the Territory Wildlife Park and the Alice Springs Desert Park, tourist event development, attracting and acquisition, tourism infrastructure development, tourism strategy, water safety, wildlife management and the Window on the Wetlands.

The responsibilities of the ministry expanded substantially at that time, as it was renamed "Tourism and Culture" and incorporated the roles of three formerly separate ministries: Arts and Museums, Parks and Wildlife, and Sport and Recreation.

There are two assistant ministers attached to the portfolio: (assistant minister for sports and community events) and (assistant minister for bringing back the Arafura Games), as part of the Gunner government's decision to appoint all government backbenchers as assistant ministers.

== List of ministers ==
=== Tourism ===
Minister	Party	Term	Ministerial title
Roger Steele	Country Liberal	1 July 1980 – 25 January 1982	Minister for Primary Production and Tourism
Roger Steele	Country Liberal	26 January 1982 - 30 November 1982	Minister for Industrial Development and Tourism
Paul Everingham	Country Liberal	1 December 1982 – 12 December 1983	Minister for Lands, Industrial Development and Tourism
Paul Everingham	Country Liberal	13 December 1983 – 20 December 1984	Minister for Industrial Development and Tourism
Ian Tuxworth	Country Liberal	17 October 1984 – 20 December 1984	Minister for Industrial Development and Tourism
21 December 1984 – 19 August 1985: no minister – responsibilities held by other ministers
Nick Dondas	Country Liberal	20 August 1985 – 28 April 1986	Minister for Industry and Small Business and Tourism
Ray Hanrahan	Country Liberal	29 April 1986 – 5 April 1988	Minister for Tourism
Eric Poole	Country Liberal	6 April 1988 – 3 September 1989	Minister for Tourism
Roger Vale	Country Liberal	4 September 1989 – 29 November 1992	Minister for Tourism
Barry Coulter	Country Liberal	30 November 1992 – 20 June 1996	Minister for Tourism
Mike Reed	Country Liberal	21 June 1996 – 29 January 1998	Minister for Tourism
Shane Stone	Country Liberal	30 January 1998 – 7 December 1998	Minister for Tourism
Mike Reed	Country Liberal	8 December 1998 – 26 August 2001	Minister for Tourism
Stephen Dunham	Country Liberal	9 February 1999 – 26 August 2001	Minister for Tourism
Syd Stirling	Labor	27 August 2001 – 12 November 2001	Minister for Tourism
Paul Henderson	Labor	13 November 2001 – 17 October 2002	Minister for Tourism
Chris Burns	Labor	18 October 2002 – 14 December 2003	Minister for Tourism
Clare Martin	Labor	15 December 2003 – 31 August 2006	Minister for Tourism
Paul Henderson	Labor	1 September 2006 – 29 November 2007	Minister for Tourism
Kon Vatskalis	Labor	30 November 2007 – 3 February 2009	Minister for Tourism
Chris Burns	Labor	4 February 2009 - 3 December 2009	Minister for Tourism
Malarndirri McCarthy	Labor	4 December 2009 – 28 August 2012	Minister for Tourism
Terry Mills	Country Liberal	29 August 2012 – 3 September 2012	Minister for Tourism
Matt Conlan	Country Liberal	4 September 2012 – 9 September 2013	Minister for Tourism and Major Events
Matt Conlan	Country Liberal	10 September 2013 – 11 December 2014	Minister for Tourism
Adam Giles	Country Liberal	12 December 2014 – 27 August 2016	Minister for Tourism
Michael Gunner	Labor	31 August 2016 – 11 September 2016	Minister for Tourism
Lauren Moss	Labor	12 September 2016 – 7 September 2020	Minister for Tourism and Culture
Natasha Fyles	Labor	8 September 2020 – present	Minister for Tourism and Hospitality

=== Arts and museums ===
Minister	Party	Term	Ministerial title
Tom Harris	Country Liberal	4 August 1999 – 30 January 2000	Minister for Education, the Arts and Cultural Affairs
Shane Stone	Country Liberal	4 September 1989 – 12 November 1990	Minister for Education and the Arts
Shane Stone	Country Liberal	20 December 1991 – 20 June 1996	Minister for the Arts
Shane Stone	Country Liberal	1 July 1995 – 20 June 1996	Minister for the Arts and Museums
Daryl Manzie	Country Liberal	21 June 1996 – 8 February 1999	Minister for the Arts and Museums
Daryl Manzie	Country Liberal	15 September 1997 – 8 February 1999	Minister for Arts and Museums
Peter Adamson	Country Liberal	9 February 1999 – 3 August 1999	Minister for Arts and Museums
Chris Lugg	Country Liberal	4 August 1999 – 30 January 2000	Minister for Arts and Museums
Peter Adamson	Country Liberal	31 January 2000 – 26 August 2001	Minister for Arts and Museums
Clare Martin	Labor	27 August 2001 – 10 July 2005	Minister for Arts and Museums
Marion Scrymgour	Labor	11 July 2005 – 3 February 2009	Minister for Arts and Museums
Alison Anderson	Labor	4 February 2009 – 5 August 2009	Minister for Arts and Museums
Gerry McCarthy	Labor	6 August 2009 – 28 August 2012	Minister for Arts and Museums
Terry Mills	Country Liberal	29 August 2012 – 3 September 2012	Minister for Arts and Museums
Matt Conlan	Country Liberal	4 September 2012 – 11 December 2014	Minister for Arts and Museums
Adam Giles	Country Liberal	12 December 2014 – 10 February 2015	Minister for Arts and Museums
Gary Higgins	Country Liberal	11 February 2015 – 27 August 2016	Minister for Arts and Museums
Michael Gunner	Labor	31 August 2016 – 11 September 2016	Minister for Arts and Museums
12 September 2016 – 7 September 2020: no minister – responsibilities held by other ministers
Chansey Paech	Labor	8 September 2020 – Present	Minister for Arts and Culture

=== Sport and recreation ===
Minister	Party	Term	Ministerial title
Nick Dondas	Country Liberal	2 January 1979 – 25 January 1982	Minister for Youth, Sport and Recreation
Nick Dondas	Country Liberal	26 January 1982 – 30 November 1982	Minister for Sport and Recreation
Nick Dondas	Country Liberal	1 December 1982 – 12 December 1983	Minister for Youth, Sport, Recreation and Ethnic Affairs
Nick Dondas	Country Liberal	13 December 1983 – 16 October 1984	Minister for Health, Youth, Sport, Recreation and Ethnic Affairs
Nick Dondas	Country Liberal	17 October 1984 – 20 December 1984	Minister for Health, Sport, Recreation and Ethnic Affairs
Jim Robertson	Country Liberal	21 December 1984 – 19 August 1985	Minister for Youth, Sport, Recreation and Ethnic Affairs
Ray Hanrahan	Country Liberal	20 August 1985 – 28 April 1986	Minister for Youth, Sport, Recreation and Ethnic Affairs
Don Dale	Country Liberal	29 April 1986 – 18 March 1987	Minister for Youth, Sport, Recreation and Ethnic Affairs
19 March 1987 – 3 September 1989: no minister – responsibilities held by other ministers
Roger Vale	Country Liberal	4 September 1989 – 12 November 1990	Minister for Youth, Sport, Recreation and Ethnic Affairs
Roger Vale	Country Liberal	13 November 1990 – 29 November 1992	Minister for Sport, Recreation, Ethnic Affairs and Local Government
Eric Poole	Country Liberal	30 November 1992 – 15 September 1993	Minister for Sport, Recreation and Ethnic Affairs
Eric Poole	Country Liberal	16 September 1993 – 30 June 1995	Minister for Sport and Recreation
Stephen Hatton	Country Liberal	1 July 1995 – 14 September 1997	Minister for Sport and Recreation
Peter Adamson	Country Liberal	15 September 1997 – 3 August 1999	Minister for Sport and Recreation
Chris Lugg	Country Liberal	4 August 1999 – 26 August 2001	Minister for Sport and Recreation
Peter Toyne	Labor	27 August 2001 – 12 November 2001	Minister for Sport and Recreation
Jack Ah Kit	Labor	13 November 2001 – 23 June 2005	Minister for Sport and Recreation
Paul Henderson	Labor	24 June 2005 – 10 July 2005	Minister for Sport and Recreation
Delia Lawrie	Labor	11 July 2005 – 31 August 2006	Minister for Sport and Recreation
Kon Vatskalis	Labor	1 September 2006 – 29 November 2007	Minister for Sport and Recreation
Matthew Bonson	Labor	30 November 2007 – 17 August 2008	Minister for Sport and Recreation
Karl Hampton	Labor	18 August 2008 – 28 August 2012	Minister for Sport and Recreation
Terry Mills	Country Liberal	29 August 2012 – 3 September 2012	Minister for Sport and Recreation
Matt Conlan	Country Liberal	4 September 2012 – 6 March 2013	Minister for Sport and Recreation
Lia Finocchiaro	Country Liberal	7 March 2013 – 13 March 2013	Minister for Sport and Recreation
Adam Giles	Country Liberal	14 March 2013 – 19 March 2013	Minister for Sport and Recreation
Matt Conlan	Country Liberal	20 March 2013 – 11 December 2014	Minister for Sport and Recreation
Gary Higgins	Country Liberal	12 December 2014 – 14 February 2016	Minister for Sport and Recreation
Nathan Barrett	Country Liberal	15 February 2016 – 11 June 2016	Minister for Sport and Recreation
Adam Giles	Country Liberal	12 June 2016 – 18 July 2016	Minister for Sport and Recreation
Gary Higgins	Country Liberal	19 July 2016 – 27 August 2016	Minister for Sport and Recreation
Michael Gunner	Labor	31 August 2016 – 11 September 2016	Minister for Sport and Recreation
12 September 2016 – 7 September 2020: no minister – responsibilities held by other ministers
Kate Worden	Labor	8 September 2020 – Present	Minister for Sport

=== Parks and wildlife ===
Minister	Party	Term	Ministerial title
Barry Coulter	Country Liberal	1 July 1995 – 20 June 1996	Minister for Parks and Wildlife
Stephen Hatton	Country Liberal	21 June 1996 – 14 September 1997	Minister for Parks and Wildlife
Tim Baldwin	Country Liberal	15 September 1997 – 7 December 1998	Minister for Parks and Wildlife
Eric Poole	Country Liberal	8 December 1998 – 8 February 1999	Minister for Parks and Wildlife
Mike Reed	Country Liberal	9 February 1999 – 26 August 2001	Minister for Parks and Wildlife
Syd Stirling	Labor	27 August 2001 – 12 November 2001	Minister for Parks and Wildlife
Kon Vatskalis	Labor	13 November 2001 – 14 December 2003	Minister for Parks and Wildlife
Chris Burns	Labor	15 December 2003 – 10 July 2005	Minister for Parks and Wildlife
Marion Scrymgour	Labor	11 July 2005 – 6 August 2007	Minister for Parks and Wildlife
Delia Lawrie	Labor	7 August 2007 – 29 November 2007	Minister for Parks and Wildlife
Len Kiely	Labor	30 November 2007 – 17 August 2008	Minister for Parks and Wildlife
Alison Anderson	Labor	18 August 2008 – 5 August 2009	Minister for Parks and Wildlife
Karl Hampton	Labor	6 August 2009 – 28 August 2012	Minister for Parks and Wildlife
Terry Mills	Country Liberal	29 August 2012 – 3 September 2012	Minister for Parks and Wildlife
Matt Conlan	Country Liberal	4 September 2012 – 9 September 2013	Minister for Parks and Wildlife
Bess Price	Country Liberal	10 September 2013 – 27 August 2016	Minister for Parks and Wildlife
Michael Gunner	Labor	31 August 2016 – 11 September 2016	Minister for Parks and Wildlife
12 September 2016 – 7 September 2020: no minister – responsibilities held by other ministers
Selena Uibo	Labor	8 September 2020 – Present	Minister for Parks and Rangers

== See also ==
- Minister for Sport (Australia)
  - Minister for Sport (New South Wales)
  - Minister for Sport (Victoria)
  - Minister for Sport and Recreation (Western Australia)
