= Members of the Northern Territory Legislative Assembly, 2020–2024 =

This is a list of members of the Northern Territory Legislative Assembly from 2020 to 2024, as elected at the 2020 election.

Name	Party	Electorate	Term in office
Ngaree Ah Kit	ALP	Karama	2016–2024
Marie-Clare Boothby	CLP	Brennan	2020–present
Joel Bowden	ALP	Johnston	2020–2024
Manuel Brown	ALP	Arafura	2023–present
Joshua Burgoyne	CLP	Braitling	2020–present
Lawrence Costa	ALP	Arafura	2016–2022
Steve Edgington	CLP	Barkly	2020–present
Lia Finocchiaro	CLP	Spillett	2012–present
Hon Natasha Fyles	ALP	Nightcliff	2012–2024
Hon Michael Gunner ^{[4]}	ALP	Fannie Bay	2008–2022
Yingiya Mark Guyula	Independent	Mulka	2016–present
Jo Hersey	CLP	Katherine	2020–present
Paul Kirby	ALP	Port Darwin	2016–2024
Robyn Lambley	Territory Alliance/Independent ^{[1]}	Araluen	2010–present
Hon Eva Lawler	ALP	Drysdale	2016–2024
Gerard Maley	CLP	Nelson	2020–present
Hon Nicole Manison	ALP	Wanguri	2013–2024
Mark Monaghan	ALP	Fong Lim	2020–2024
Hon Lauren Moss	ALP	Casuarina	2014–2024
Chansey Paech	ALP	Gwoja	2016–present
Brent Potter ^{[4]}	ALP	Fannie Bay	2022–2024
Kezia Purick	Independent	Goyder	2008–2024
Ian Sloan ^{[3]}	CLP	Daly	2020–2021
Mark Turner	ALP ^{[2]}	Blain	2020–2024
Selena Uibo	ALP	Arnhem	2016–present
Kate Worden	ALP	Sanderson	2016–2024
Bill Yan	CLP	Namatjira	2020–present
Dheran Young ^{[3]}	ALP	Daly	2021–present

^{1} Robyn Lambley resigned from the Territory Alliance party on 21 October 2020, approximately two months after the 2020 election, where she was elected under the Territory Alliance banner. She currently sits in the parliament as an independent.
^{2} Mark Turner was removed from the Labor Party caucus on 18 February 2021, but remained a member of the party.
^{3} Country Liberal MLA for Daly Ian Sloan resigned on 19 August 2021. Labor member Dheran Young won the by-election to replace him on 11 September 2021.
^{4} Chief minister and Labor MLA for Fannie Bay Michael Gunner resigned on 27 July 2022. Labor member Brent Potter won the by-election to replace him on 20 August 2022.

== See also ==
- 2020 Northern Territory general election
