= Minister for Children and Families =

Position within an Australian territory government

Minister for Territory Families
- Incumbent; Dale Wakefield since 12 September 2016
- Territory Families
- Style: The Honourable
- Appointer: Administrator of the Northern Territory

The Northern Territory Minister for Territory Families is a Minister of the Crown in the Government of the Northern Territory. The minister administers their portfolio through Territory Families.

The Minister is responsible for child guardianship, child protection, children and families policy, children's services, family and parent support services, family responsibility agreements and orders, family violence services, men's and women's policy, multicultural affairs, pensioner and carer concessions, out of home care, the Seniors Card, seniors policy, youth affairs and services and youth detention.

The former minister is Dale Wakefield (Labor). She was sworn in on 12 September 2016 following the Labor victory at the 2016 election. The ministry and department were both created in a reorganisation by the incoming government, which was significant for having separated youth justice from adult correctional services for the first time following the Don Dale Youth Detention Centre scandal and subsequent Royal Commission into Juvenile Detention in the Northern Territory.

The enlarged Territory Families ministry replaced a number of separate ministries from the preceding Giles Ministry, including the ministers for children and families, women's policy, men's policy, multicultural affairs, Senior Territorians and Young Territorians. The Minister for Children in the Gunner Ministry is a new position concerned with "whole of government children's policy", while specific areas of child-related policy lie in Territory Families.

== List of ministers ==
=== Territory families ===
Minister	Party	Term	Ministerial title
Dale Wakefield	Labor	12 September 2016 – 7 September 2020	Minister for Territory Families
Kate Worden	Labor	8 September 2020 – Present	Minister for Territory Families and Urban Housing

=== Children and families / family and community services ===
Minister	Party	Term	Ministerial title
Don Dale	Country Liberal	19 March 1987 – 27 July 1989	Minister for Health and Community Services
Marshall Perron	Country Liberal	31 July 1989 – 3 September 1989	Minister for Health and Community Services
Stephen Hatton	Country Liberal	4 September 1989 – 12 November 1990	Minister for Health and Community Services
Daryl Manzie	Country Liberal	13 November 1990 - 29 November 1992	Minister for Health and Community Services
Mike Reed	Country Liberal	30 November 1992 – 30 June 1995	Minister for Health and Community Services
1 July 1995 – 14 September 1997: no minister – responsibilities held by other ministers
Denis Burke	Country Liberal	15 September 1997 – 8 February 1999	Minister for Health, Family and Children's Services
Stephen Dunham	Country Liberal	9 February 1999 – 26 August 2001	Minister for Health, Family and Children's Services
Jane Aagaard	Labor	27 August 2001 – 12 November 2003	Minister for Health, Family and Children's Services
Jane Aagaard	Labor	13 November 2001 – 14 December 2003	Minister for Health and Community Services
Marion Scrymgour	Labor	15 December 2003 – 10 July 2005	Minister for Family and Community Services
Delia Lawrie	Labor	11 July 2005 – 6 August 2007	Minister for Family and Community Services
Marion Scrymgour	Labor	7 August 2007 – 30 June 2008	Minister for Family and Community Services
Marion Scrymgour	Labor	1 July 2008 – 17 August 2008	Minister for Children and Families
Malarndirri McCarthy	Labor	18 August 2008 – 3 December 2009	Minister for Children and Families
Kon Vatskalis	Labor	4 December 2009 – 28 August 2012	Minister for Children and Families
Robyn Lambley	Country Liberal	4 September 2012 – 5 March 2013	Minister for Children and Families
Alison Anderson	Country Liberal	6 March 2013 – 9 September 2013	Minister for Children and Families
John Elferink	Country Liberal	14 March 2013 – 27 August 2016	Minister for Children and Families
Michael Gunner	Labor	31 August 2016 – 11 September 2016	Minister for Children and Families
Nicole Manison	Labor	12 September 2016 – 25 June 2018	Minister for Children
Michael Gunner	Labor	26 June 2018 – 7 September 2020	Minister for Children
Lauren Moss	Labor	8 September 2020 – Present	Minister for Children

=== Women ===
Minister	Party	Term	Ministerial title
Shane Stone	CLP	15 September 1997 – 8 February 1999	Minister for Women's Policy
Denis Burke	CLP	9 February 1999 – 26 August 2001	Minister for Women's Policy
Clare Martin	Labor	27 August 2001 – 10 July 2005	Minister for Women's Policy
Marion Scrymgour	Labor	11 July 2005 – 17 August 2008	Minister for Women's Policy
Malarndirri McCarthy	Labor	18 August 2008 – 28 August 2012	Minister for Women's Policy
Robyn Lambley	CLP	4 September 2012 – 5 March 2013	Minister for Women's Policy
Alison Anderson	CLP	6 March 2013 – 9 September 2013	Minister for Women's Policy
Bess Price	CLP	15 September 2013 – 27 August 2016	Minister for Women's Policy
Michael Gunner	Labor	31 August 2016 – 11 September 2016	Minister for Women's Policy
12 September 2016 – 7 September 2020: no minister – responsibilities held by other ministers
Lauren Moss	Labor	8 September 2020 – Present	

=== Multicultural affairs ===
Minister	Party	Term	Ministerial title
Nick Dondas	Country Liberal	1 December 1982 – 12 December 1983	Minister for Youth, Sport, Recreation and Ethnic Affairs
Nick Dondas	Country Liberal	13 December 1983 – 20 December 1984	Minister for Health, Youth, Sport, Recreation and Ethnic Affairs
Jim Robertson	Country Liberal	13 December 1983 – 19 August 1985	Minister for Youth, Sport, Recreation and Ethnic Affairs
Ray Hanrahan	Country Liberal	20 August 1985 – 28 April 1986	Minister for Youth, Sport, Recreation and Ethnic Affairs
Don Dale	Country Liberal	29 April 1986 – 18 March 1987	Minister for Youth, Sport, Recreation and Ethnic Affairs
19 March 1987 – 3 September 1989: no minister – responsibilities held by other ministers
Roger Vale	Country Liberal	4 September 1989 – 12 November 1990	Minister for Youth, Sport, Recreation and Ethnic Affairs
Roger Vale	Country Liberal	13 November 1990 – 29 November 1992	Minister for Sport, Recreation, Ethnic Affairs and Local Government
Eric Poole	Country Liberal	30 November 1992 – 15 September 1993	Minister for Sport, Recreation and Ethnic Affairs
Shane Stone	Country Liberal	16 September 1993 – 20 June 1996	Minister for Ethnic Affairs
Stephen Hatton	Country Liberal	21 June 1996 – 14 September 1997	Minister for Ethnic Affairs
Mick Palmer	Country Liberal	15 September 1997 – 3 August 1999	Minister for Ethnic Affairs
Peter Adamson	Country Liberal	4 August 1999 – 26 August 2001	Minister for Ethnic Affairs
Kon Vatskalis	Labor	27 August 2001 – 9 December 2004	Minister for Ethnic Affairs
Kon Vatskalis	Labor	9 December 2004 – 31 August 2006	Minister for Multicultural Affairs
Delia Lawrie	Labor	1 September 2006 – 6 August 2007	Minister for Multicultural Affairs
Paul Henderson	Labor	7 August 2007 – 28 August 2012	Minister for Multicultural Affairs
Terry Mills	Country Liberal	29 August 2012 – 13 March 2013	Minister for Multicultural Affairs
Peter Styles	Country Liberal	14 March 2013 – 27 August 2016	Minister for Multicultural Affairs
Michael Gunner	Labor	31 August 2016 – 11 September 2016	
12 September 2016 – 20 December 2018: no minister – responsibilities held by other ministers
Nicole Manison	Labor	21 December 2018 – 7 September 2020	Minister for Multicultural Affairs
Kate Worden	Labor	8 September 2020 – Present	Minister for Multicultural Affairs

=== Senior territorians ===
Minister	Party	Term	Ministerial title
Denis Burke	Country Liberal	15 September 1997 – 8 February 1999	Minister for Senior Territorians
Stephen Dunham	Country Liberal	9 February 1999 – 26 August 2001	Minister for Senior Territorians
Clare Martin	Labor	27 August 2001 – 10 July 2005	Minister for Senior Territorians
Marion Scrymgour	Labor	11 July 2005 – 29 November 2007	Minister for Senior Territorians
Matthew Bonson	Labor	30 November 2007 – 17 August 2008	Minister for Senior Territorians
Malarndirri McCarthy	Labor	18 August 2008 – 5 August 2009	Minister for Senior Territorians
Gerry McCarthy	Labor	6 August 2009 – 3 December 2009	Minister for Senior Territorians
Rob Knight	Labor	4 December 2009 – 28 August 2012	Minister for Senior Territorians
Terry Mills	Country Liberal	29 August 2012 – 6 March 2013	Minister for Senior Territorians
Lia Finocchiaro	Country Liberal	7 March 2013 – 13 March 2013	Minister for Senior Territorians
Peter Styles	Country Liberal	14 March 2013 – 11 December 2014	Minister for Senior Territorians
Gary Higgins	Country Liberal	12 December 2014 – 10 February 2015	Minister for Senior Territorians
Peter Styles	Country Liberal	11 February 2015 – 27 August 2016	Minister for Senior Territorians
Michael Gunner	Labor	31 August 2016 – 11 September 2016	Minister for Senior Territorians
12 September 2016 – 7 September 2020: no minister – responsibilities held by other ministers
Lauren Moss	Labor	8 September 2020 – Present	Minister for Seniors

=== Young territorians ===
Minister	Party	Term	Ministerial title
Nick Dondas	Country Liberal	2 January 1979 - 30 June 1980	Minister for Youth, Sport and Recreation
1 July 1980 – 31 December 1980: no minister – responsibilities held by other ministers
Nick Dondas	Country Liberal	1 January 1981 – 25 January 1982	Minister for Youth, Sport and Recreation
26 January 1982 – 30 November 1982: no minister – responsibilities held by other ministers
Nick Dondas	Country Liberal	1 December 1982 – 12 December 1983	Minister for Youth, Sport, Recreation and Ethnic Affairs
Nick Dondas	Country Liberal	13 December 1983 – 20 December 1984	Minister for Health, Youth, Sport, Recreation and Ethnic Affairs
Jim Robertson	Country Liberal	13 December 1983 – 19 August 1985	Minister for Youth, Sport, Recreation and Ethnic Affairs
Ray Hanrahan	Country Liberal	20 August 1985 – 28 April 1986	Minister for Youth, Sport, Recreation and Ethnic Affairs
Don Dale	Country Liberal	29 April 1986 – 18 March 1987	Minister for Youth, Sport, Recreation and Ethnic Affairs
19 March 1987 – 3 September 1989: no minister – responsibilities held by other ministers
Roger Vale	Country Liberal	4 September 1989 – 12 November 1990	Minister for Youth, Sport, Recreation and Ethnic Affairs
13 November 1990 – 14 September 1997: no minister – responsibilities held by other ministers
Shane Stone	Country Liberal	15 September 1997 – 8 February 1999	Minister for Young Territorians
Denis Burke	Country Liberal	9 February 1999 – 26 August 2001	Minister for Young Territorians
Clare Martin	Labor	27 August 2001 – 10 July 2005	Minister for Young Territorians
Marion Scrymgour	Labor	11 July 2005 – 29 November 2007	Minister for Young Territorians
Matthew Bonson	Labor	30 November 2007 – 17 August 2008	Minister for Young Territorians
Malarndirri McCarthy	Labor	18 August 2008 – 5 August 2009	Minister for Young Territorians
Gerry McCarthy	Labor	6 August 2009 – 3 December 2009	Minister for Young Territorians
Rob Knight	Labor	4 December 2009 – 28 August 2012	Minister for Young Territorians
Terry Mills	Country Liberal	29 August 2012 – 6 March 2013	Minister for Young Territorians
Lia Finocchiaro	Country Liberal	7 March 2013 – 13 March 2013	Minister for Young Territorians
Peter Styles	Country Liberal	14 March 2013 – 14 February 2016	Minister for Young Territorians
Nathan Barrett	Country Liberal	15 February 2016 – 18 July 2016	Minister for Young Territorians
Gary Higgins	Country Liberal	19 July 2016 – 7 August 2016	Minister for Young Territorians
Michael Gunner	Labor	31 August 2016 – 11 September 2016	Minister for Young Territorians
12 September 2016 – 7 September 2020: no minister – responsibilities held by other ministers
Lauren Moss	Labor	8 September 2020 – Present	Minister for Youth

== Former posts ==
=== Child protection ===
Minister	Party	Term	Ministerial title
Marion Scrymgour	Labor	7 August 2007 – 17 August 2008	Minister for Child Protection
Malarndirri McCarthy	Labor	18 August 2008 – 3 December 2009	Minister for Child Protection
Kon Vatskalis	Labor	4 December 2009 – 28 August 2012	Minister for Child Protection
Terry Mills	Country Liberal	29 August 2012 – 3 September 2012	Minister for Child Protection

=== Men's policy ===
Minister	Party	Term	Ministerial title
Bess Price	CLP	12 December 2014 – 27 August 2016	Minister for Men's Policy
Michael Gunner	Labor	31 August 2016 – 11 September 2016	Minister for Men's Policy
