= Strategic Indigenous Housing and Infrastructure Program =

The Strategic Indigenous Housing and Infrastructure Program (SIHIP) is a joint program between the Australian federal government and the Northern Territory government to design and construct housing in a range of Indigenous Australian communities in the Northern Territory. It follows on from the previous Federal government's Northern Territory National Emergency Response.

The A$647 million program proposes to construct over 750 houses and refurbish another 2,500 houses in 73 communities across the Northern Territory, as well as providing essential urban infrastructure to support the new houses. Major capital works are proposed in 16 communities, pending the establishment of long-term leases. A key focus of the program is the aim to provide jobs and training opportunities for Indigenous Australians.

The Federal Government announced in May 2009 that work under the program had started in three locations, Groote Eylandt, the Tiwi Islands and Tennant Creek. The government has announced that at least 20 per cent of the local workforce will be indigenous, with the aim of creating longer-term employment outcomes for communities. Work at Tennant Creek includes providing electricity, water, sewerage and roads to the town camps.

The program has been criticised by indigenous leaders such as Alison Anderson and Galarrwuy Yunupingu for what they claim is excessive bureaucracy and overheads. Yunupingu said in August 2009 "I keep hearing that, two years on, not one house has been built and I see it, too. Not one house. I keep getting the complaint that all the companies are doing is consulting and consulting, getting their daily fees and disappearing again.", adding "It's a system designed to profit non-Aborigines while nothing gets done." The local federal member of parliament, Damian Hale had earlier defended the program, citing the remoteness of the areas where the houses are proposed to be built. Hale commented that "It will not be fixed in 20 months but what we can fix is have the land lease arrangements in place properly, the alliances are put in place" and stated that "[W]e're not building in Sydney or Melbourne, we're building in remote parts of Australia."

A briefing to Anderson, a Northern Territory parliamentarian, by the administrator of the program, was said to have indicated that as few as 300 houses may be built; this briefing was later described as "inaccurate". Anderson challenged the administration charge claimed by the Territory government—initially $100 million, 15 per cent of the project budget—claiming it was excessive, and was successful in pushing for cost savings of $50 million. The Chief Minister of the Northern Territory, Paul Henderson, has pledged that the program would construct the 750 houses, with construction of 55 new homes to be underway by the end of 2010.
