= Minister for Trade, Business and Asian Relations =

In the Government of the Northern Territory, Australia

Minister for Trade, Business and Innovation
- Incumbent; Michael Gunner since 12 September 2016
- Department of Trade, Business and Innovation
- Style: The Honourable
- Appointer: Administrator of the Northern Territory

The Northern Territory Minister for Trade, Business and Innovation is a Minister of the Crown in the Government of the Northern Territory The minister administers their portfolio through the Department of Trade, Business and Innovation.

The Minister is responsible for Aboriginal business enterprise support, apprenticeships and traineeships, Asian engagement, business and industry support and development, business and skilled migration, coordination of major infrastructure, projects and investments, defence community liaison, development of defence-related industries, economic development, financial assistance to industry associations and business, industry, economic and labour market analysis, industry engagement and participation, the Innovator in Residence Program, international education, international investment promotion and attraction, major infrastructure projects coordination and investment, procurement policy, the Procurement Review Board, quality of training, regional coordination of economic development, research and innovation, strategic defence, Team NT, Territory Business Centres, Territory marketing and investment attraction, trade development, strategy and policy, training and employment programs and assistance schemes, veterans support, vocational education and training administration. They are also responsible for overseeing Desert Knowledge Australia, the Northern Territory Training Commission and NT Build.

The current minister is Michael Gunner (Labor). He was sworn in on 12 September 2016 following the Labor victory at the 2016 election.

== List of ministers for trade, business and innovation ==
Minister	Party	Term	Ministerial title
Michael Gunner	Labor	12 September 2016 – present	Minister for Trade, Business and Innovation
