= Minister for Housing, Local Government and Community Development =

Minister for Housing and Community Development
- Incumbent; Gerry McCarthy since 12 September 2016
- Department of Housing and Community Development
- Style: The Honourable
- Appointer: Administrator of the Northern Territory

The Northern Territory Minister for Housing and Community Development is a Minister of the Crown in the Government of the Northern Territory. The minister administers their portfolio through the Department of Housing and Community Development.

The Minister is responsible for Aboriginal housing, communities and homelands, community and social housing, community development for regional centres and remote communities and homelands, the coordination of funding of essential services to remote Indigenous communities not serviced by Commonwealth programs, the coordination of municipal essential services for regional centres, remote communities and homelands, essential services for remote communities and homelands, government employee housing, homelessness services, housing, interpreting and translating services, local government, local government funding, local government elections and electoral matters, public housing, and remote communities and homelands. They are also responsible for the Jabiru Town Development Authority and the Northern Territory Grants Commission.

The current minister is Gerry McCarthy (Labor). He was sworn in on 12 September 2016 following the Labor victory at the 2016 election.
