= Minister for Logistics and Infrastructure =

Government minister in the Northern Territory

Minister for Infrastructure, Planning and Logistics
- Incumbent; Eva Lawler since 7 September 2020
- Department of Infrastructure, Planning and Logistics
- Style: The Honourable
- Appointer: Administrator of the Northern Territory

The Northern Territory Minister for Infrastructure, Planning and Logistics is a Minister of the Crown in the Government of the Northern Territory. The minister administers their portfolio through the Department of Infrastructure, Planning and Logistics.

The Minister is responsible for assets and program management, the aviation industry, building advisory services, Darwin Ports, development and management of strategic industrial and residential land, domestic and international air services, economic development facilitation, the freight industry, infrastructure provision, land administration, land information, land use planning and development assessment, lands and planning, logistics industry, maritime industry, Offshore Supply Base, ports development, procurement in infrastructure services, public transport, the rail industry, regional air services development, release of industrial and residential land, road network management, road transport, shipping industry, strategic growth and infrastructure planning, transport assets, transport policy and planning and transport safety (marine, rail and road). They are also responsible for the Development Consent Authority, the Northern Territory Planning Commission and the AustralAsia Railway Corporation.

The current minister has been Eva Lawler (Labor) since 7 September 2020, who succeeded Manison after a reshuffle of the cabinet following Labor's second consecutive win at the 2020 election.

== List of ministers for infrastructure, planning and logistics ==
Minister	Party	Term	Ministerial title
Nicole Manison	Labor	12 September 2016 – 7 September 2020	Minister for Infrastructure, Planning and Logistics
Eva Lawler	Labor	7 September 2020 – present	Minister for Infrastructure, Planning and Logistics

== Former posts ==
=== AustralAsia railway ===
Minister	Party	Term	Ministerial title
Barry Coulter	Country Liberal	1 July 1995 – 14 September 1997	Minister for the Railway
Barry Coulter	Country Liberal	15 September 1997 – 18 June 1999	Minister for the AustralAsia Railway
Denis Burke	Country Liberal	21 June 1999 – 26 August 2001	Minister for the AustralAsia Railway
Paul Henderson	Labor	27 August 2001 – 17 October 2002	Minister for the AustralAsia Railway
Clare Martin	Labor	18 October 2002 – 25 November 2007	Minister for the AustralAsia Railway
Paul Henderson	Labor	26 November 2007 – 29 November 2007	Minister for the AustralAsia Railway

=== Territory ports ===
Minister	Party	Term	Ministerial title
Stephen Hatton	Country Liberal	21 December 1984 – 28 April 1986	Minister for Ports and Fisheries
Nick Dondas	Country Liberal	29 April 1986 – 18 March 1987	Minister for Ports and Fisheries
19 March 1987 – 14 September 1997: no minister – responsibilities held by other ministers
Barry Coulter	Country Liberal	15 September 1997 – 18 June 1999	Minister for Territory Ports
Denis Burke	Country Liberal	21 June 1999 – 3 August 1999	Minister for Territory Ports
Mick Palmer	Country Liberal	4 August 1999 – 26 August 2001	Minister for Territory Ports
Jack Ah Kit	Labor	27 August 2001 – 12 November 2001	Minister for Territory Ports
