= Chansey Paech =

Australian politician

The Honourable Chansey Paech MLA
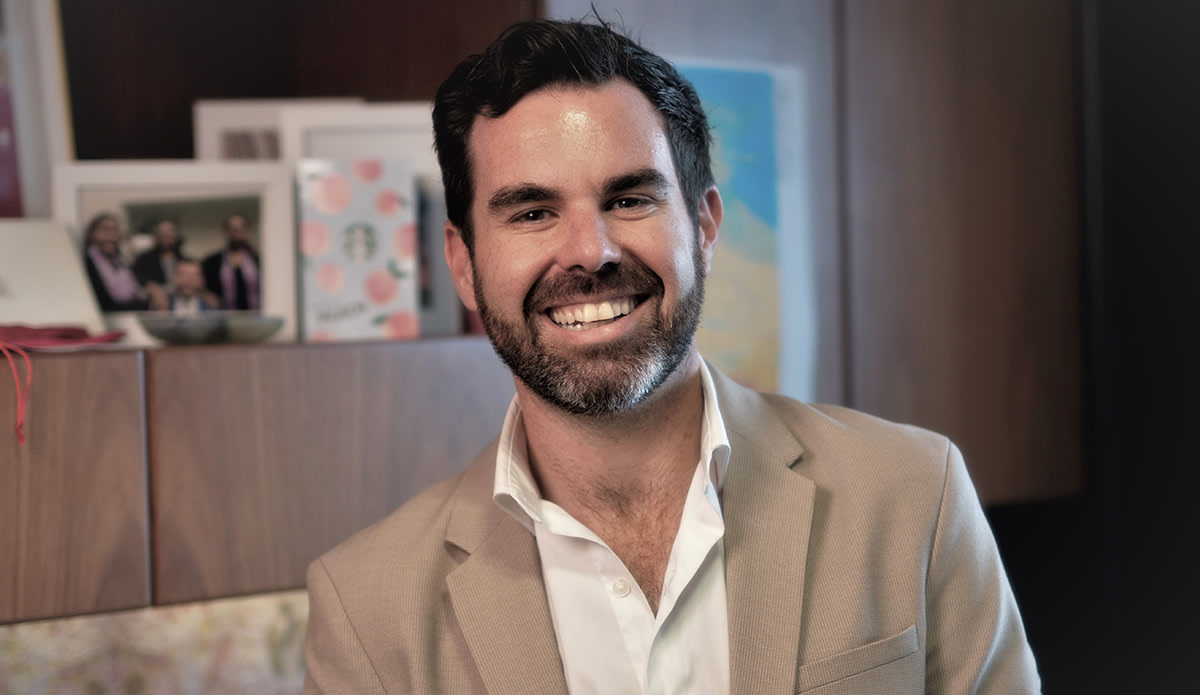

20th Deputy Chief Minister of the Northern Territory
- In office 21 December 2023 – 28 August 2024
- Chief Minister: Eva Lawler
- Preceded by: Nicole Manison
- Succeeded by: Gerard Maley

Attorney-General of the Northern Territory
- In office 23 May 2022 – 28 August 2024
- Chief Minister: Natasha Fyles; Eva Lawler
- Preceded by: Selena Uibo
- Succeeded by: Gerard Maley

12th Speaker of the Northern Territory Legislative Assembly
- In office 23 June 2020 – 7 September 2020
- Preceded by: Kezia Purick
- Succeeded by: Ngaree Ah Kit

Member of the Northern Territory Legislative Assembly for Gwoja
- Incumbent
- Assumed office 22 August 2020
- Preceded by: New seat

Member of the Northern Territory Legislative Assembly for Namatjira
- In office 27 August 2016 – 22 August 2020
- Preceded by: Alison Anderson
- Succeeded by: Bill Yan

Personal details
- Born: Chanston James Paech; November 1987 (age 38) Alice Springs, Northern Territory, Australia
- Party: Labor Party

Chanston James "Chansey" Paech (/ˈtʃænzi peɪk/, CHAN-zee PAYK; born 1987) is an Australian politician. He is a Labor Party member of the Northern Territory Legislative Assembly since 2016, representing the electorate of Namatjira until 2020 and Gwoja thereafter. He is of Arrente, Arabana and Gurindji descent.

== Early life and education ==
Chanston James Paech was born in 1987 in Alice Springs, in the Northern Territory of Australia. His mother is Aboriginal, of the Arrernte and Gurindji peoples, and his father of German descent.

He is the great-great-grandson of Central Australian pioneer, Topsy Smith, and the great-great nephew of bushman Walter Smith. Paech is the only openly gay male MP in the NT Legislative Assembly, and before entering politics, he was a prominent LGBT rights activist.

Paech was educated in Alice Springs and participated in many youth programs, including the inaugural National Indigenous Youth Parliament. He went on to study at Charles Darwin University in the fields of environmental and land management, conservation, and horticulture.

== Early career ==
Paech was elected to the Alice Springs Town Council in 2012 and served until entering the Northern Territory Legislative Assembly in 2016. .

He also served as a Director of the Central Australian Aboriginal Congress and as Deputy Chair of the Institute for Aboriginal Development, working alongside prominent Aboriginal activist Pat Turner.

== Policies ==
=== Justice ===
Paech was sworn in as the Northern Territory Attorney General in May 2022 and committed to overhauling the Northern Territory's Justice and Correctional systems, in October 2022 Paech introduced a suite of laws raising the age of criminal responsibility and reforming adult mandatory sentencing.

Paech also introduced a suite of amendments to the Northern Territory's anti-discrimination laws to give better protections for vulnerable people and minority groups.

In February 2022, Paech, having responsibility for the Northern Territory's sacred sites legislation, tabled a decision in Northern Territory parliament to reject an application to expand the controversial McArthur River mine.

=== Housing ===
In the Gunner Ministry Paech was sworn in as the Minister for Remote Housing, Homelands and Town Camps. He opposed the federal Morrison Government for failures to deliver remote housing on homelands and town camps.

=== Views ===
Paech has condemned the Northern Territory Emergency Response, commonly known as the Intervention, and the succeeding Stronger Futures policy.

== Politics ==
Northern Territory Legislative Assembly
Years	Term	Electoral division	Party
2016–2020	13th	Namatjira	Labor
2020–present	14th	Gwoja	Labor

Paech was preselected as the Labor candidate for Namatjira for the 2016 Territory election. The seat's incumbent since 2005 (dating to when the seat was known as MacDonnell), independent Alison Anderson, was retiring after three terms. On paper, Paech faced daunting odds. The seat had a notional Country Liberal Party majority of 20.8 percent, and a redistribution had seemingly consolidated the CLP's hold on the seat by pushing it into Alice Springs. However, Anderson, who had served under four banners during her tenure (Labor, CLP, independent, Palmer United and independent again) endorsed Paech as her successor; she is a longtime Indigenous activist, and retained substantial goodwill in the area. The ABC's election analyst Antony Green believed that Anderson's endorsement made Namatjira "a certain Labor gain."

Paech won the seat resoundingly, taking 59 percent of the two-party vote on a swing of over 29 percent, the second-largest swing of the election—enough to revert Namatjira to its traditional status as a safe Labor seat. He was subsequently made Deputy Speaker and Chairman of Committees.

Paech is the first openly gay Indigenous MP in Australia. He gave his maiden parliamentary speech on 19 October 2016, in which he said he entered the chamber "eternally proud of who I am and where I come from ... I am young, I am gay, I am black; a true-blue Territorian. I am a proud face of the diversity and future of the great Australian Labor party." He added: "I look forward to the day when this country will recognise my rights as equal rights, when I too can marry in my country, on my country, as a recognised first Australian."

In June 2020, Paech was elected Speaker of the Northern Territory Legislative Assembly, making him the first Aboriginal and openly gay speaker of an Australian Parliament, replacing Kezia Purick, who resigned after findings of corrupt conduct against her by the Northern Territory Independent Commissioner Against Corruption. Ahead of the 2020 Territory election, a redistribution erased Paech's majority in Namatjira and made it a notional CLP seat. Paech believed this made Namatjira impossible to hold and ran for re-election in neighbouring Gwoja, winning easily.

He resigned as Speaker in September 2020 to join the Gunner Ministry as Minister for Local Government; Minister for Central Australia Economic Reconstruction; Minister for Remote Housing and Town Camps; Minister for Indigenous Essential Services; and Minister for Arts and Culture.

In May 2022, Paech was sworn in as the Northern Territory Attorney General; Leader of Government Business; Minister for Racing, Gaming and Licensing; Minister for Arts and Culture and Minister for Local Government in the Fyles Ministry.

Paech is a member of the Labor Party's Left faction.

Northern Territory Legislative Assembly
Preceded by Alison Anderson	Member for Namatjira; 2016–2020	Succeeded by Bill Yan
New seat	Member for Gwoja; 2020–present	Incumbent
Preceded by Kezia Purick	Speaker of the Northern Territory Legislative Assembly; 2020 - 2020	Succeeded by Ngaree Ah Kit
