= Minister for Northern Australia (Northern Territory) =

- Incumbent; Michael Gunner since 12 September 2016
- Department of Trade, Business and Innovation
- Style: The Honourable
- Appointer: Administrator of the Northern Territory

The Northern Territory Minister for Northern Australia is a Minister of the Crown in the Government of the Northern Territory. The minister administers their portfolio through the Department of Trade, Business and Innovation.

The Minister is responsible for Northern Australia development policy, coordination and intergovernmental liaison.

The current minister is Michael Gunner (Labor). He was sworn in on 12 September 2016 following the Labor victory at the 2016 election.

== See also ==
- Minister for Regional Development, Local Government and Territories, in the Australian federal government.
- Minister for the North-West, a defunct position in the government of Western Australia
