= Minister for Aboriginal Affairs (Northern Territory) =

- Incumbent; Selena Uibo since 31 January 2019
- Department of the Chief Minister
- Style: The Honourable
- Appointer: Administrator of the Northern Territory

The Northern Territory Minister for Aboriginal Affairs is a Minister of the Crown in the Government of the Northern Territory. The minister administers their portfolio through the Department of the Chief Minister.

The Minister is responsible for Aboriginal affairs policy and coordination and the Office of Aboriginal Affairs.

The current minister is Selena Uibo (Labor). She was sworn in on 31 January 2019 following the dismissal of Ken Vowles on 21 December 2018 for breaking Cabinet confidentiality.

== List of ministers for Aboriginal affairs ==
Minister	Party	Term	Ministerial title
Stephen Hatton	Country Liberal	30 November 1992 – 30 June 1995	Minister for Aboriginal Development
Daryl Manzie	Country Liberal	1 July 1995 – 20 June 1996	Minister for Aboriginal Development
Mick Palmer	Country Liberal	21 June 1996 – 14 September 1997	Minister for Aboriginal Development
Tim Baldwin	Country Liberal	15 September 1997 – 8 February 1999	Minister for Aboriginal Development
Loraine Braham	Country Liberal	9 February 1999 – 26 November 2000	Minister for Aboriginal Development
Peter Adamson	Country Liberal	26 November 2000 – 26 August 2001	Minister for Aboriginal Development
Syd Stirling	Labor	27 August 2001 – 12 November 2001	Minister for Indigenous Affairs
Clare Martin	Labor	13 November 2001 – 31 August 2006	Minister for Indigenous Affairs
Clare Martin	Labor	1 September 2006 – 25 November 2007	Minister for Indigenous Policy
Paul Henderson	Labor	26 November 2007 – 29 November 2007	Minister for Indigenous Policy
Marion Scrymgour	Labor	30 November 2007 – 8 February 2009	Minister for Indigenous Policy
Alison Anderson	Labor	9 February 2009 – 5 August 2009	Minister for Indigenous Policy
Malarndirri McCarthy	Labor	6 August 2009 – 3 December 2009	Minister for Indigenous Policy
Malarndirri McCarthy	Labor	4 December 2009 – 28 August 2012	Minister for Indigenous Development
Terry Mills	Country Liberal	29 August 2012 – 3 September 2012	Minister for Indigenous Development
Alison Anderson	Country Liberal	4 September 2012 – 13 March 2013	Minister for Indigenous Advancement
14 March 2013 – 10 February 2015: no minister – responsibilities held by other ministers
Adam Giles	Country Liberal	11 February 2015 – 27 August 2016	Minister for Indigenous Affairs
Michael Gunner	Labor	31 August 2016 – 11 September 2016	Minister for Indigenous Affairs
Michael Gunner	Labor	12 September 2016 – 26 June 2018	Minister for Aboriginal Affairs
Ken Vowles	Labor	26 June 2018 – 21 December 2018	Minister for Aboriginal Affairs
Selena Uibo	Labor	31 January 2019 – current	Minister for Aboriginal Affairs

== Former posts ==
=== Minister Assisting the Chief Minister ===
Minister	Party	Term	Ministerial title
Terry McCarthy	CLP	4 September 1989 – 12 November 1990	Minister Assisting the Chief Minister on Aboriginal Affairs
13 November 1990 – 12 November 2001: no assistant minister
Jack Ah Kit	Labor	13 November 2001 – 23 June 2005	Minister Assisting the Chief Minister on Indigenous Affairs
Paul Henderson	Labor	24 June 2005 – 10 July 2005	Minister Assisting the Chief Minister on Indigenous Affairs
Elliot McAdam	Labor	11 July 2005 – 29 November 2007	Minister Assisting the Chief Minister on Indigenous Affairs
