= Minister for Agriculture and Fisheries =

- Incumbent; Gerard Maley since 28 August 2024
- Department of Agriculture and Fisheries
- Style: The Honourable
- Appointer: Administrator of the Northern Territory

The Northern Territory Minister for Agriculture and Fisheries is a Minister of the Crown in the Government of the Northern Territory. The minister administered their portfolio through the Department of Agriculture and Fisheries.

Paul Kirby (Labor) was sworn in on 31 January 2019 following the expulsion of Ken Vowles from the Gunner Ministry.

In September 2020, the Department of Primary Industry and Resources was restructured into the Department of Industry, Tourism and Trade.

In 2024, Gerard Maley was sworn in as Minister for Agriculture and Fisheries.

== Responsibilities ==
The responsibilities of this position included:

- Animal welfare
- Energy industry development
- Oil and gas pipelines
- Oil, gas, and geothermal titles administration
- Energy operations regulation
- Energy policy
- Environmental management of energy (oil, gas and geothermal) operations
- Environmental management of mining operations
- Fisheries management
- Hygienic production of meat for human consumption
- Interstate agricultural quarantine
- Mining development, mining titles administration
- The Northern Territory Geological Survey
- Oil and gas strategy, policy and industry development
- Petroleum industry development
- Petroleum titles administration
- Primary industry biosecurity
- Primary production and industry development
- Protection of consumers of veterinary services
- The regulation and management of mining and energy operations

== List of ministers for primary industry and resources ==
| Minister | Party | Term | Ministerial title |
|---|---|---|---|
| Ken Vowles | Labor | 12 September 2016 – 21 December 2018 | Minister for Primary Industry and Resources |
| Paul Kirby | Labor | 31 January 2019 – September 2020 | Minister for Primary Industry and Resources |
| Gerard Maley | Country Liberal | 28 August 2024 – present | Minister for Agriculture and Fisheries; Minister for Recreational Fishing |
