= Alison Anderson =

Australian politician

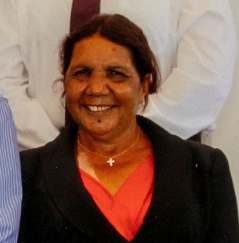
- Anderson in 2012

Leader of the Palmer United Party in the Northern Territory
- In office 28 April 2014 – 29 November 2014
- Preceded by: Office created
- Succeeded by: Office abolished

Member of the Northern Territory Legislative Assembly for Namatjira
- In office 25 August 2012 – 8 August 2016
- Preceded by: Division created
- Succeeded by: Chansey Paech

Member of the Northern Territory Legislative Assembly for MacDonnell
- In office 18 June 2005 – 6 August 2012
- Preceded by: John Elferink
- Succeeded by: Division abolished

Personal details
- Born: 28 January 1958 (age 68) Haasts Bluff, Northern Territory, Australia
- Party: Independent (2009–2011; 2014–present)
- Other political affiliations: Labor (2005–09); Country Liberal (2011–14); Palmer United (2014)
- Domestic partner: Nicolas Rothwell

Alison Nampitjinpa Anderson (born 28 January 1958) is an Australian politician.

She was a member of the Northern Territory Legislative Assembly between 2005 and 2016, representing the electorate of Namatijra (known as MacDonnell until 2012). Currently an independent, she has previously served as a minister for both the Labor Party and Country Liberal Party and been territory leader of the Palmer United Party.

Anderson entered the Northern Territory Assembly as a star candidate for the Labor Party in the 2005 election. She was re-elected unopposed as the Member for MacDonnell in the August 2008 Territory election and with the subsequent return of the Henderson Labor Government was appointed to the Cabinet. She held variously the positions of Minister for Natural Resources, Environment and Heritage, Minister for Parks and Wildlife, Minister for Arts and Museums and Minister for Indigenous Policy.

Anderson left the Cabinet and the Labor Party in 2009, after a dispute over Indigenous housing, and then sat as an independent for two years; she joined the opposition Country Liberal Party in 2011 and was elected as a Country Liberal candidate at the 2012 election. She resigned from the CLP in 2014, along with two other Indigenous MPs, briefly becoming an independent once again. However, on 27 April 2014 it was announced that the three MLAs had joined the Palmer United Party, with Anderson serving as parliamentary leader. She resigned from Palmer United to sit as an independent on 29 November 2014. It was briefly rumoured that she was returning to the CLP amid the 2015 CLP leadership spill, but she remained an independent.

Anderson speaks six Indigenous languages: Anmatyerre, Luritja, Pitjantjatjara, Warlpiri, Western Arrernte and Yankunytjatjara. She is also an accomplished artist. She is among Australia's most senior Indigenous politicians, and has been a prominent Indigenous activist, including as an Aboriginal and Torres Strait Islander Commission (ATSIC) Central Zone Commissioner (see: List of Indigenous Australian politicians). Her partner is Nicolas Rothwell, journalist with The Australian.

Anderson retired at the 2016 Territory election.

== Early life and career ==
Anderson was born in the remote community of Haasts Bluff and was raised in a number of other communities, including Hermannsburg and Papunya. She moved to Alice Springs to attend school, studying at Traeger Park School, Alice Springs High School, and St Philip's College. She subsequently received a Diploma of Community Management from the Batchelor Institute of Indigenous Tertiary Education.

Returning to Papunya, she was elected chief executive officer of the Papunya Community Council in 1985, a role which she fulfilled until handing it over to her husband, Steve Handley, in 2000. She thereby became a prominent representative for the town, then as now one of the country's most impoverished communities, where basic services failed entirely at times. In this role, Anderson was heavily involved throughout the 1990s in conflicts with successive Country Liberal Party territory governments over the provision of electricity, education, and health services.

== Aboriginal and Torres Strait Islander Commission ==
Anderson was first elected as the ATSIC Commissioner for the Northern Territory Central Zone in November 1999. She developed a reputation as an advocate for women's rights within the organisation, and in 2003, was involved in the creation of ATSIC's women's advisory board. She became seen as a leading contender for chairperson of the organisation, and in 2002, unsuccessfully challenged veteran leader Geoff Clark. Eight months later, she nominated for the position of deputy chairperson after the resignation of Ray Robinson, but was defeated by one vote despite Robinson's endorsement. She supported the federal government's decision to abolish ATSIC in 2004, declaring that reform of the organisation was overdue, but was sharply critical of their decision to replace it with only a consultative committee. She was nevertheless appointed by the federal government as a Central Australian representative to their Round Table on Indigenous issues later that year.

== Northern Territory parliamentarian ==
Northern Territory Legislative Assembly
Years	Term	Electoral division	Party
2005–2008	10th	MacDonnell	Labor
2008–2009	11th	MacDonnell	Labor
2009–2011	Changed allegiance to:		Independent
2011–2012	Changed allegiance to:		Country Liberal
2012–2014	12th	Namatjira	Country Liberal
2014	Changed allegiance to:		Independent
2014	Changed allegiance to:		Palmer United
2014–2016	Changed allegiance to:		Independent

In late 2004, Anderson announced her intention to contest Labor preselection for the seat of MacDonnell, traditionally a safe Labor seat, but then held by two-term CLP member John Elferink. She had previously been preselected by the party to stand at the 2001 election, but had withdrawn. She subsequently resigned from the ATSIC board, and was confirmed as the Labor candidate in March. She was widely seen as a star candidate during the campaign, due to her high profile in Central Australia, stemming from her work as an ATSIC Commissioner. Her campaign suffered an early blow when her husband was charged with stealing offences in February. She suffered a further blow when, through April and May, the Alice Springs News and The Age aired sweeping allegations of corruption and mismanagement during her husband's administration of Papunya. She resisted calls from the opposition to stand aside as the candidate, dismissing the claims as a smear campaign. In spite of the allegations, she was easily elected in June, defeating Elferink with a swing of more than 30%.

The Papunya scandal continued to afflict Anderson in her first months in parliament, as the Commonwealth government launched an investigation into allegations of misuse of government funds by the town administration. This escalated in September, when her now-estranged husband, against whom she had taken out a restraining order, filed a statutory declaration with police alleging that Anderson was responsible for corrupt activities during his administration, and had attempted to bribe elders during her campaign. She was subsequently cleared of any wrongdoing in the police investigation. The Commonwealth investigation, while reporting widespread missing funds, did not attribute responsibility for this to Anderson. However, allegations of mismanagement persisted in the media for months afterwards.

As her electorate represents much of Central Australia, Anderson has often acted as a spokesperson on issues affecting the communities in the area. In May 2007, she risked expulsion from the party by joining Barbara McCarthy and Karl Hampton in crossing the floor to vote against a government bill to allow the continuation of mining at the McArthur River Mine, near Borroloola.

=== Party switches and retirement ===
Anderson was re-elected unopposed in 2008, and continued to be critical of the Henderson government. Finally, she resigned from the Labor Party on 4 August 2009, commenting that "I'm not happy with the way we have conducted ourselves as a government." She also noted her unhappiness that Chief Minister Paul Henderson did not speak out in her defence following an article severely criticising her written by journalist Nigel Adlam in the Northern Territory News. The resignation comes after Anderson had been very critical of the Northern Territory government about what she considered to be the inefficient operation of the $672 million Strategic Indigenous Housing and Infrastructure Program.

On 8 September 2011, she joined the Country Liberal Party, the opposition party in the Territory. She was one of 12 high-profile Indigenous Australians to join the CLP that day. Thereafter, Anderson's former party attacked her record prior to her entry to Parliament and promotion to their Cabinet, repeating allegations made in Russell Skelton's book King Brown Country: The Betrayal of Papunya.

The Country Liberal Party was swept into office in the 2012 Northern Territory general election, ending 11 years of Labor rule. The victory was notable for the support it achieved from Indigenous people in pastoral and remote electorates; a total of five Aboriginal CLP candidates won election to the Assembly. Anderson won a smashing victory in the new electorate of Namatjira, essentially a reconfigured version of MacDonnell. She was appointed Minister for Indigenous Advancement. In a nationally reported speech in November 2012, Anderson condemned welfare dependency and a culture of entitlement in her first ministerial statement on the status of Aboriginal communities in the Territory and said the CLP would focus on improving education and on helping create real jobs for Indigenous people.

Anderson was dropped from cabinet after the CLP only won five booths in the federal seat of Lingiari, which has the most Indigenous voters in Australia. This, combined with a factional struggle coming to a head, resulted in Anderson being dropped from cabinet on 9 September. In March 2014, she walked out of parliament after accusing the CLP of failing to keep promises made for the bush, including the reinstatement of a ministry for Aboriginal affairs. The Chief Minister at that time, Adam Giles, responded by suspending her from the CLP parliamentary wing. On 3 April, Anderson and two other Indigenous MPs, Larisa Lee and Francis Xavier Kurrupuwu, resigned from the CLP, slipping their resignation letters under the door of the CLP office in Darwin. According to The Australian, they were laying the groundwork for a new party to speak for regional interests. However, on 27 April, it was announced they would be joining the Palmer United Party instead, with Anderson as the party's Northern Territory leader and the aim of campaigning to become Chief Minister at the 2016 election. This lasted only until November, when she and Lee became independents once again.

On 3 August 2016, Anderson announced her retirement, effective with the 2016 election. She said that she never intended to serve for more than three terms. Despite her previous fraught relationship with Labor, she campaigned for the Labor candidates in both her seat and the neighbouring seat of Stuart; both won resoundingly in Labor's massive landslide that year.

Northern Territory Legislative Assembly
Preceded by John Elferink	Member for MacDonnell; 2005–2012	Division abolished
Division created	Member for Namatjira; 2012–2016	Succeeded by Chansey Paech
