= Natasha Fyles =

Australian politician

The Honourable Natasha Fyles
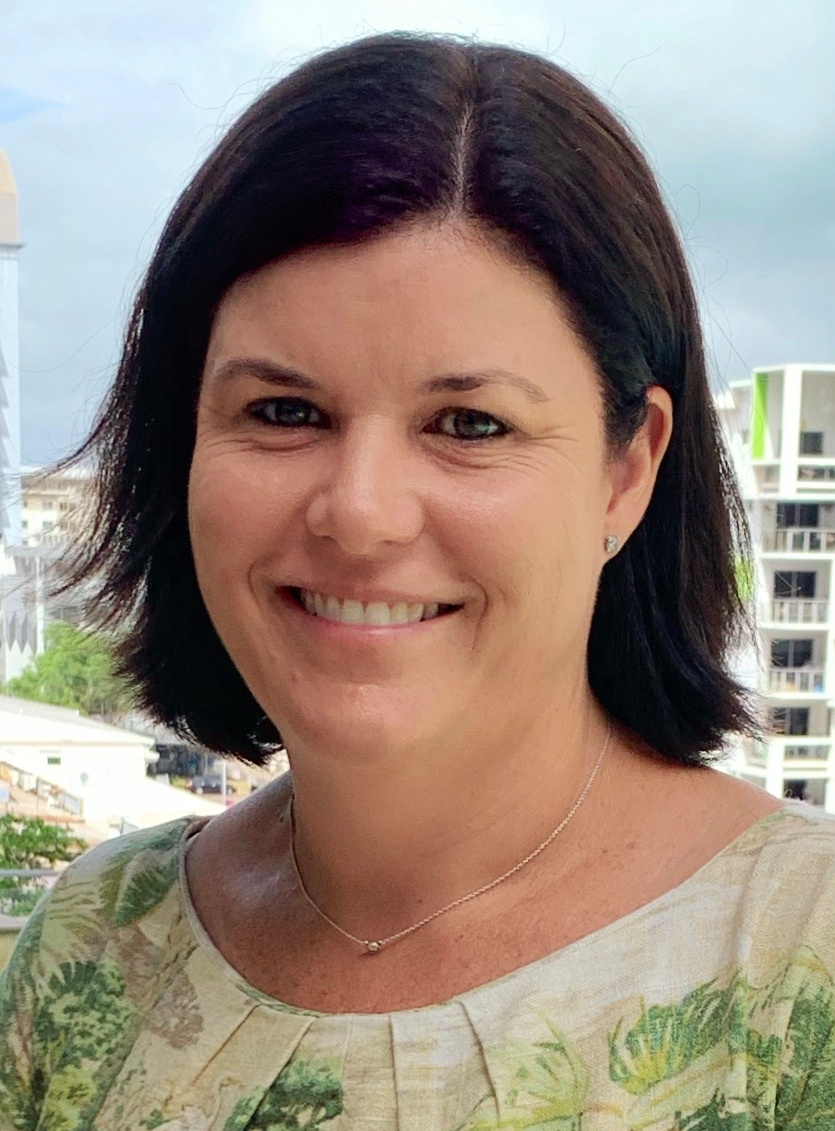
- Fyles in 2023

12th Chief Minister of the Northern Territory
- In office 13 May 2022 – 21 December 2023
- Deputy: Nicole Manison
- Administrator: Vicki O'Halloran; Hugh Heggie
- Preceded by: Michael Gunner
- Succeeded by: Eva Lawler

Minister for Health
- In office 12 September 2016 – 21 December 2023
- Preceded by: Michael Gunner
- Succeeded by: Selena Uibo

Attorney-General of the Northern Territory Minister for Justice
- In office 31 August 2016 – 7 September 2020
- Preceded by: John Elferink
- Succeeded by: Selena Uibo

Member of the Northern Territory Legislative Assembly for Nightcliff
- In office 25 August 2012 – 24 August 2024
- Preceded by: Jane Aagaard
- Succeeded by: Kat McNamara

Personal details
- Born: 26 May 1978 (age 48) Darwin, Northern Territory, Australia
- Party: Labor
- Spouse: Paul Fyles
- Children: Two
- Education: University of Canberra
- Occupation: Teacher, swimming coach

Natasha Kate Fyles (born 26 May 1978) is an Australian politician and former teacher who served as the 12th Chief Minister of the Northern Territory and Minister for Health. She was the leader of the Northern Territory branch of the Australian Labor Party (ALP) from May 2022 until her resignation in December 2023. She was a member of the Northern Territory Legislative Assembly (MLA) for the division of Nightcliff from 2012 until her defeat at the 2024 election. She previously served as 22nd attorney-general of the Northern Territory and the territory's minister for Justice from 2016 to 2020.

Prior to her election, Fyles trained as a teacher at the University of Canberra, and has worked as a physical education teacher and swimming coach. She is married to Peter Fyles and has two children.

Fyles was part of Labor's landslide victory in the 2016 Northern Territory election and was reelected as the member for Nightcliff in the 2020 election holding the largest majority in the Northern Territory. Fyles was the Minister for Health, Minister for Tourism and Hospitality, Minister for Racing, Gaming and Licensing, Minister for Alcohol Policy, Minister for Major Events, Minister for the National Resilience Centre and Leader of Government Business.

Following Michael Gunner's resignation from the role of Chief Minister on 10 May 2022, Fyles was elected as his replacement by the Labor caucus on 13 May 2022. She resigned on 19 December 2023 amid conflict-of-interest allegations due to her holding undisclosed shares in fracking and mining companies whose projects were greenlit during her tenure.

== Early life and career ==
Fyles was born in Darwin in 1978 at the old Darwin hospital and grew up in the Northern suburbs. She completed her teaching degree at the University of Canberra and then returned to Darwin, teaching at St Mary's Primary School for five years and was actively involved in School Sports NT during this time.

After travelling and working overseas, she returned to the Territory as executive director of Royal Life Saving Society NT, delivering water safety programs across the Northern Territory in both urban and remote centres and also in neighbouring East Timor.

Natasha joined the Australian Labor Party in 1993. She is aligned with Labor Left.

== Early political career ==
Northern Territory Legislative Assembly
Years	Term	Electoral division	Party
2012–2016	12th	Nightcliff	Labor
2016–2020	13th	Nightcliff	Labor
2020–2024	14th	Nightcliff	Labor

=== Member for Nightcliff ===
In 2012 the incumbent Member for Nightcliff Jane Aagaard retired, and despite a swing against Labor at that year's election, the seat was retained for Labor by Fyles and she was elected to the Northern Territory Legislative Assembly as the Member for Nightcliff.

Labor's massive landslide at the 2016 election saw Fyles consolidate her hold on the seat; with a swing in her favour of 17.8 percent and a majority of 26.9 percent, Nightcliff became the safest seat in the Territory. Fyles was again re-elected as the member for Nightcliff in 2020 with a majority of 24.9 percent. Amidst a CLP landslide, she unexpectedly lost re-election at the 2024 election, narrowly being defeated by Greens candidate Kat McNamara.

== 2016 election ==
=== Minister for Health ===
Labor went into the 2016 territory election as unbackable favourites, with Northern Territory opinion polls indicating a massive swing against the CLP. Labor won 18 seats in the 25-member Legislative Assembly. Fyles was reelected as the Member for Nightcliff and took on the portfolio of Health.

=== Attorney-General of the Northern Territory ===
Fyles served as the Attorney-General of the Northern Territory from 31 August 2016 to 7 September 2020. She was succeeded by Selena Uibo.

== 2020 election ==
Fyles was reelected as the Member for Nightcliff in 2020 holding the largest majority in any Northern Territory electorate. She has served as the Minister for Health in the Gunner ministry since 2016 and continues as the Northern Territory's Health Minister following the 22 August 2020 election, which saw the Labor government re-elected.

She was appointed as the Minister for National Resilience to work with the Australian federal government on making Darwin's highly touted Howard Springs quarantine facility a 'centre for national resilience'. This use of this facility is central to the repatriation of Australians stranded overseas due to COVID-19.

Fyles was the also the Leader of Government Business and the Minister for Alcohol Policy, Minister for Tourism and Hospitality, Minister for Major Events, and Minister for Racing, Gaming and Licensing.

== Chief Minister of the Northern Territory ==
Chief Minister and Territory Labor leader Michael Gunner announced his resignation on 10 May 2022. Fyles was elected as party leader by the Labor caucus on 13 May 2022, and was sworn in as Chief Minister later that day.

On 24 September 2023, Fyles was allegedly assaulted with a cream-covered pancake by a member of the public at the Sunday markets at Nightcliff.

=== Undisclosed share controversy and resignation ===
In November 2023, it was revealed that Fyles held 169 shares in gas company Woodside Energy, attracting conflict-of-interest allegations due to Fyles' approval of fracking in the Beetaloo Basin and of a development of an industrial precinct at Middle Arm. Independent Senator for the Australian Capital Territory, David Pocock, called for further scrutiny of her share portfolio, using an existing Senate inquiry into the Middle Arm precinct. Fyles defended her share holdings, stating that they had been declared for over a decade and that no conflict of interest was present. However, she later divested the shares, stating she wanted to 'end the distraction', also claiming that she had declared any financial interests from the past decade.

Despite her previous statements that she had declared all financial interests, in December 2023, it was revealed that she holds 754 undeclared shares in South32, a company that owns a manganese mine on Groote Eylandt. Fyles faced further conflict of interest allegations and calls to resign, due to Fyles' decision earlier in 2023 to not investigate health impacts from the Groote Eylandt mine, with Leader of the Opposition Lia Finocchiaro calling her actions a 'profound betrayal of public trust'. As a result of the controversy, Fyles resigned on 19 December 2023. The next day, Fyles' treasurer, Eva Lawler, was announced as her successor, with Attorney-General Chansey Paech replacing Nicole Manison as Deputy Chief Minister.

== Political views ==
Fyles supports a woman's right to have an abortion.

Fyles supports the Indigenous Voice to Parliament.

Northern Territory Legislative Assembly
Preceded by Jane Aagaard	Member for Nightcliff; 2012–2024	Succeeded by Kat McNamara
Political offices
Preceded by John Elferink	Attorney-General and Minister for Justice; 2016–2020	Succeeded by Selena Uibo
Preceded by Michael Gunner	Minister for Health; 2016–2023	Succeeded by Selena Uibo
Preceded by Michael Gunner	Chief Minister of the Northern Territory; 2022–2023	Succeeded by Eva Lawler
Party political offices
Preceded by Michael Gunner	Leader of the Territory Labor Party; 2022–2023	Succeeded by Eva Lawler
