= Nicole Manison =

Australian politician

The Honourable Nicole Manison
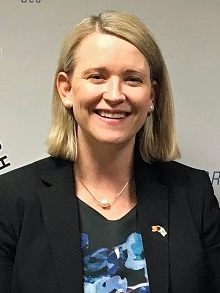
- Manison in 2017

19th Deputy Chief Minister of the Northern Territory
- In office 12 September 2016 – 21 December 2023
- Chief Minister: Michael Gunner; Natasha Fyles
- Preceded by: Peter Styles
- Succeeded by: Chansey Paech

Treasurer of the Northern Territory
- In office 31 August 2016 – 7 September 2020
- Preceded by: Adam Giles
- Succeeded by: Michael Gunner

Member of the Northern Territory Legislative Assembly for Wanguri
- In office 16 February 2013 – 24 August 2024
- Preceded by: Paul Henderson
- Succeeded by: Oly Carlson

Personal details
- Born: Tennant Creek, Northern Territory, Australia
- Party: Labor Party
- Spouse: Scott McNeill
- Education: Curtin University
- Occupation: Media advisor

Nicole Susan Manison is an Australian politician. She was a Labor Party member of the Northern Territory Legislative Assembly from 2013 to 2024, representing the electorate of Wanguri. She previously served as Deputy Chief Minister from 2016 to 2023, serving under both Michael Gunner and Natasha Fyles. She was also Treasurer from 2016 to 2020. She is a member of Labor Right

Northern Territory Legislative Assembly
Years	Term	Electoral division	Party
2013–2016	12th	Wanguri	Labor
2016–2020	13th	Wanguri	Labor
2020–2024	14th	Wanguri	Labor

== Early life and education ==
Nicole Susan Manison was born in Tennant Creek, Northern Territory. Her father was a police officer and her mother a payroll officer.

She attended local schools, including Casuarina Senior College in Darwin.

She studied journalism and public relations at Curtin University in Perth, Western Australia, graduating with a Bachelor of Mass Communication majoring in journalism and public relations.

== Career ==
Prior to entering politics, Manison worked as human resources and communications manager for MG Kailis Group and as a media advisor to former Labor leaders Paul Henderson and Delia Lawrie.

Manison is a member of Labor Right. She was elected to the Legislative Assembly in the 2013 by-election after the resignation of former Chief Minister Paul Henderson. On 18 February 2013, opposition leader Delia Lawrie appointed Manison to the Labor frontbench in the portfolios of Public Employment and Public Housing. Manison was later promoted to Health, Essential Services, Statehood, Multicultural Affairs, Young Territorians and Senior Territorians portfolios.

Following Labor's victory at the 2016 election, Manison was sworn in as Treasurer of the Northern Territory on 31 August, replacing former Chief Minister Adam Giles. On 11 September, she was selected as the new deputy leader of the Labor Party and Deputy Chief Minister, following the defeat of Lynne Walker at the election. She was also designated as Minister for Infrastructure, Planning and Logistics and Minister for Children.

The aftermath of the 2020 election saw a reshuffle of the ministry. Chief Minister Michael Gunner opted to become his own Treasurer, but retained Manison as his deputy. Manison was sworn into the new cabinet as Minister for Fire, Police and Ambulance Services, Mining and Industry, Northern Australia and Trade, Defence Industries, Agribusiness and Aquaculture, and International Education.

In early 2024, she announced she would be retiring at the next election in 2024. Manison stated she wanted to spend more time with her family, and did not have a new job planned.

In November 2024, less than three months after leaving office, Manison accepted a role with Tamboran Resources as vice-president of government relations and public affairs, leading to revolving door criticisms. Greens MP Kat McNamara called for the details of the contract to be made public. In April 2024, Chief Minister Eva Lawler had signed a nine-year deal with Tamboran to buy fracked gas from the Beetaloo Basin in the Northern Territory. The Centre for Public Integrity called for Manison to resign from her new corporate role, and for her recent decisions to be reviewed.

== Personal life ==
Manison regards Darwin as home, but has also lived in Alice Springs, Groote Eylandt, and Canberra.

She married Scott.

She has been very active in many sports, including representing the Northern Territory at junior level in netball and volleyball.

Northern Territory Legislative Assembly
Preceded by Paul Henderson	Member for Wanguri; 2013–2024	Succeeded by Oly Carlson
Political offices
Preceded by Dave Tollner	Treasurer of the Northern Territory; 2016–2020	Succeeded by Michael Gunner
Preceded by Peter Styles	Deputy Chief Minister of the Northern Territory; 2016–2023	Succeeded by Chansey Paech
Preceded by Peter Chandler as Minister for Infrastructure; Dave Tollner as Minister for Lands and Planning	Minister for Infrastructure, Planning and Logistics; 2016–2020	Succeeded by Eva Lawler
