= Lia Finocchiaro =

Australian politician (born 1984)

The Honourable Lia Finocchiaro MLA
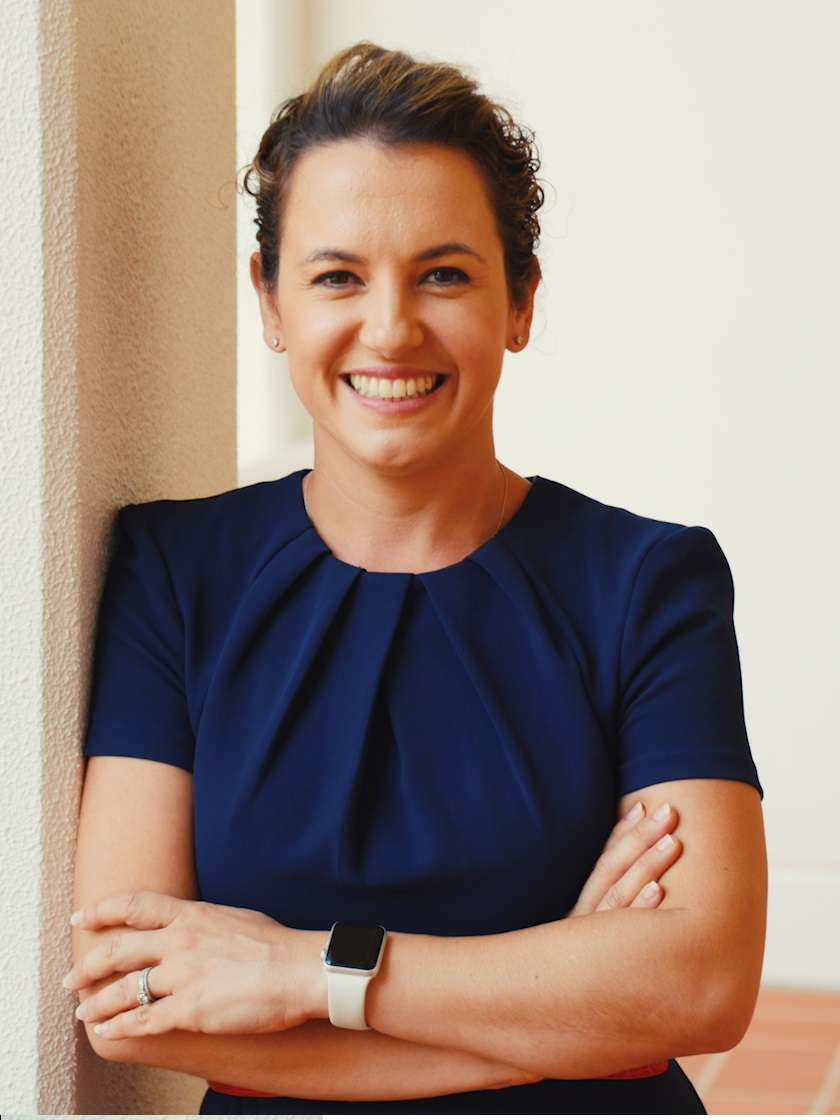
- Finocchiaro in 2020

14th Chief Minister of the Northern Territory
- Incumbent
- Assumed office 28 August 2024
- Deputy: Gerard Maley
- Administrator: Hugh Heggie; David Connolly
- Preceded by: Eva Lawler

Minister for Defence Industries
- Incumbent
- Assumed office 28 August 2024
- Chief Minister: Herself
- Preceded by: Eva Lawler

Minister for Police, Fire and Emergency Services
- Incumbent
- Assumed office 28 August 2024
- Chief Minister: Herself
- Preceded by: Brent Potter

13th Leader of the Opposition in the Northern Territory
- In office 1 February 2020 – 28 August 2024
- Deputy: Gary Higgins; Gerard Maley
- Preceded by: Gary Higgins
- Succeeded by: Selena Uibo

Leader of the Country Liberal Party
- Incumbent
- Assumed office 1 February 2020
- Deputy: Gerard Maley
- Preceded by: Gary Higgins

Member of the Northern Territory Legislative Assembly for Spillett
- Incumbent
- Assumed office 27 August 2016
- Preceded by: Seat established

Member of the Northern Territory Legislative Assembly for Drysdale
- In office 25 August 2012 – 27 August 2016
- Preceded by: Ross Bohlin
- Succeeded by: Eva Lawler
Party leadership positions
Chief Opposition Whip
In office 2 September 2016 – 1 February 2020
Leader	Gary Higgins
Preceded by	John Elferink
Succeeded by	Joshua Burgoyne
Deputy Leader of the Opposition
In office 2 September 2016 – 1 February 2020
Leader	Gary Higgins
Preceded by	Lynne Walker
Succeeded by	Gerard Maley
Deputy Leader of the Country Liberal Party
In office 2 September 2016 – 1 February 2020
Leader	Gary Higgins
Preceded by	Peter Styles
Succeeded by	Gary Higgins (interim)
Ministerial offices
Minister for Statehood
In office 6 March 2013 – 13 March 2013
Premier	Terry Mills; Adam Giles
Preceded by	Terry Mills
Succeeded by	Adam Giles
Minister for Racing, Gaming and Licensing
In office 6 March 2013 – 13 March 2013
Premier	Terry Mills
Preceded by	Matt Conlan
Succeeded by	Adam Giles
Minister for Sport and Recreation
In office 6 March 2013 – 13 March 2013
Premier	Terry Mills
Preceded by	Matt Conlan
Succeeded by	Adam Giles
Minister for Seniors and Youth
In office 6 March 2013 – 13 March 2013
Premier	Terry Mills
Preceded by	Terry Mills
Succeeded by	Peter Styles
Succeeded by

Personal details
- Born: Lia Emele Finocchiaro; 26 February 1984 (age 42) Darwin, Northern Territory, Australia
- Party: Country Liberal
- Spouse: Sam Burke
- Relations: Denis Burke (father-in-law)
- Children: 2
- Education: University of Adelaide
- Profession: Lawyer

Lia Emele Finocchiaro (Italian pronunciation: [ˈliːa finokˈkjaːro]; born 26 February 1984) is an Australian politician who has served as the Chief Minister of the Northern Territory since August 2024. A member of the Country Liberal Party (CLP), she has represented the seat of Spillett in the Northern Territory Legislative Assembly since her election in 2016. Following the resignation of Gary Higgins on 1 February 2020, she became the Leader of the Opposition in the Northern Territory. Prior to this, she served as the member for Drysdale from 2012 to 2016.

Finocchiaro led the CLP to a landslide victory in the 2024 Northern Territory general election. She became chief minister at the age of 39, the second-youngest head of government in the Territory's history after Paul Everingham, and is the first non-Labor woman to hold the post.

== Early life ==
Finocchiaro was born in Darwin and grew up in Palmerston. She attended local primary schools before completing her secondary education at Kormilda College. While in high school, she became "the highest-ranking army cadet in the Northern Territory". She studied the International Baccalaureate diploma, then graduated with a double degree in law and international studies from the University of Adelaide. She returned to Darwin in 2008, and was admitted as a legal practitioner in the Northern Territory, commencing work as a graduate clerk at the Clayton Utz law firm. She also received a Graduate Diploma of Legal Practice from Charles Darwin University.

== Parliament ==
Northern Territory Legislative Assembly
Years	Term	Electoral division	Party
2012–2016	12th	Drysdale	Country Liberal
2016–2020	13th	Spillett	Country Liberal
2020–2024	14th	Spillett	Country Liberal
2024–present	15th	Spillett	Country Liberal

In 2012, the Country Liberal Party preselected Finocchiaro for the central Palmerston seat of Drysdale in that year's election, instead of sitting CLP member Ross Bohlin, who unsuccessfully ran against her as a conservative independent. She was the youngest MLA in the history of the Legislative Assembly.

On 7 March 2013, Finocchiaro was elevated to the Second Mills Ministry, becoming Minister for Sport and Recreation, Racing, Statehood, Young Territorians and Senior Territorians. Aged 28, she was the youngest minister in Territory history. However, she was dropped from the ministry on 14 March after Adam Giles successfully challenged then-Chief Minister Terry Mills only a week later.

Following a redistribution of electoral boundaries, Finocchiaro sought CLP preselection for the new seat of Spillett, taking in strong conservative suburbs between Darwin and Palmerston—including her base in Durack. She defeated Treasurer Dave Tollner for CLP preselection. Finocchiaro went into the 2016 election with a notional majority of 17.9%, making Spillett the CLP's safest seat in Darwin/Palmerston at the time.

== CLP deputy leadership (2016–2020) ==
On election night, the Territory swung heavily to Labor, which won a landslide majority government. However, Finocchiaro weathered this massive Labor wave with only a small swing against her in Spillett, proving to be in the least danger of the CLP's elected members. She was the only CLP member whose reelection was assured on election night, and for a few days it was possible that she would be the only CLP member left in the legislature. Ultimately, Finocchiaro was joined by fellow second-term member Gary Higgins. Meanwhile, her previous seat of Drysdale was lost to Labor candidate Eva Lawler.

On 2 September, Higgins, the sole survivor of the Giles cabinet, became CLP leader and opposition leader, with Finocchiaro as his deputy. Finnochiaro faced the task of helping the CLP recover from one of the worst defeats of a sitting government at the state or territory level in Australia. The CLP was recognised as the Official Opposition after the Solicitor-General advised that the five independents could not realistically form an alternative government. Although the CLP was well short of the numbers for official status in the chamber, the new Labor government of Michael Gunner promised that the CLP would be properly resourced as an opposition.

As the sole opposition MPs in the Assembly, Higgins and Finocchiaro divided all opposition portfolios between them. Finocchiaro served as Shadow Minister for Justice and Attorney-General, as well as Shadow Minister for Police, Fire and Emergency Services, Health, Children, Territory Families, Education, Trade, and Essential Services. She also served as Opposition Whip. This was unusual, since the Opposition Whip is responsible for ensuring party MPs toe the official party line. However, Finocchiaro did not have any responsibility to keep anyone in line since she and Higgins were the only members of the CLP party room.

== Leader of the Opposition (2020–2024) ==
On 1 February 2020, Higgins resigned as CLP leader and opposition leader, with Finocchiaro replacing him. Former Chief Minister and Territory Alliance Leader Terry Mills claimed to have replaced her as Opposition Leader on 18 March 2020, however this claim was not formalised by the Legislative Assembly.

On 24 March, Finocchiaro raised a motion under standing orders which allowed the assembly to decide on the opposition party, with the CLP winning opposition status by 5 votes to 3.

Finocchiaro led the CLP to a modest recovery at the 2020 Territory election. The CLP picked up a six-seat swing, increasing its seat count to eight and reducing Labor to a bare majority of two.

On 11 September 2021, Finocchiaro's party suffered a further election loss when Labor's Dheran Young won a by-election to the Assembly seat of Daly, which was being vacated by Country Liberal Party MLA Ian Sloan, marking the first time the Governing party had won a seat off the opposition in a by-election.

== Chief Minister (2024–present) ==
At the 24 August 2024 Territory election, Finocchiaro led the CLP to one of the most comprehensive victories on record at the state or territory level in Australia. The CLP more than doubled its seat count, from seven seats at dissolution to 17 for a strong majority government. Along the way, the CLP took all but two seats in Darwin/Palmerston, including a near-sweep of Darwin's northern suburbs which have been Territory Labor's power base since the turn of the millennium. The CLP unseated all but two cabinet ministers. One of them was Lawler, who had become Chief Minister in December 2023; she is the Territory's third head of government to lose their own seat. Finocchiaro herself saw her majority in Spillett balloon to 29.5 percent, making Spillett the safest seat in the Territory.

With the CLP victory beyond doubt even though counting was still underway, Finocchiaro advised the Administrator, Hugh Heggie, that she could form a government with her new majority. She then had herself and CLP deputy leader Gerard Maley sworn in as an interim two-person government on 28 August. Until the full ministry was sworn in on 9 September, Finocchiaro and Maley divided all portfolios between them. Finocchiaro had already announced before the election that she would serve as her own police minister.

On 17 October 2024, legislation introduced by the Finocchiaro government to lower the age of criminal responsibility back to 10 years of age passed the parliament.

On 19 February 2025, whilst speaking at a Bombing of Darwin ceremony, Lia garnered criticism when she opted to exclude traditional land owners from her opening remarks, notably the only speaker in attendance to do so, in what is Australia most heavily Indigenous populated territory. She later defended her decision not to acknowledge traditional owners, calling Aboriginal country acknowledgements 'divisive' and stating "there was absolutely no need".

== Political views ==
=== Indigenous Voice to Parliament ===
Finocchiaro supports the Indigenous Voice to Parliament in principle, but has requested more detail about the proposal. While the CLP's organisational wing is officially opposed to the proposal (as are the two Coalition parties at the federal level, but not in most states), the CLP's parliamentary wing maintains a neutral stance. However, on 22 August, she confirmed that she would be voting "no" at the referendum, citing the lack of detail about the Voice from the federal government and was concerned that the Voice would not adequately represent Aboriginal Territorians. However, she also announced that party members would be given a free vote on the issue and she would not be campaigning against the Voice.

=== Social views ===
Finocchiaro supports a woman's right to have an abortion and voted in favour of legislation that made abortion legal in the Northern Territory and made the abortion drug RU486 more accessible for women in remote areas.

== Personal life ==
Finocchiaro is married to Sam Burke, the son of former NT chief minister Denis Burke. She has two children. She is of Italian descent and has been "heavily involved in the NT's Italian community", including as CEO of the Italian Festival Association of the Northern Territory.

She is a joint patron of the Young Professionals Network NT and a patron of the Palmerston Football Club, the Palmerston Combined Probus Club and the Palmerston Cricket Club.

Political offices
Preceded by Eva Lawler	Chief Minister of the Northern Territory; 2024–present	Incumbent
Preceded by Gary Higgins	Leader of the Opposition; 2020–2024	Succeeded by Selena Uibo
Preceded by Lynne Walker	Deputy Leader of the Opposition; 2016–2020	Succeeded by Gary Higgins
Northern Territory Legislative Assembly
Preceded by Ross Bohlin	Member for Drysdale; 2012–2016	Succeeded by Eva Lawler
New seat	Member for Spillett; 2016–present	Incumbent
Party political offices
Preceded by Gary Higgins	Leader of the Country Liberal Party; 2020–present	Incumbent
Preceded by Peter Styles	Deputy Leader of the Country Liberal Party; 2016–2020	Succeeded by Gary Higgins
