= Selena Uibo =

Aboriginal Australian politician

The Honourable Selena Uibo MLA
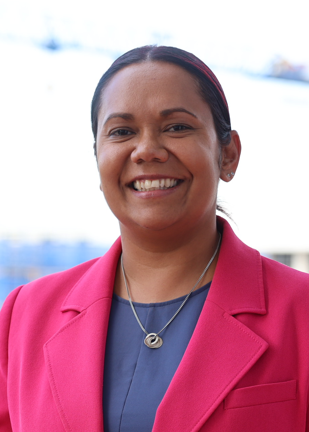
- Official portrait, 2025

14th Leader of the Opposition in the Northern Territory
- Incumbent
- Assumed office 3 September 2024
- Deputy: Dheran Young; Ed Smelt
- Preceded by: Lia Finocchiaro

Leader of the Territory Labor Party
- Incumbent
- Assumed office 3 September 2024
- Deputy: Dheran Young; Ed Smelt
- Preceded by: Eva Lawler

Member of the Northern Territory Legislative Assembly for Arnhem
- Incumbent
- Assumed office 27 August 2016
- Preceded by: Larisa Lee

Personal details
- Born: 25 March 1985 (age 41) Darwin, Northern Territory, Australia
- Party: Labor Party
- Occupation: Teacher

Selena Jane Malijarri Uibo (/ˈjuːboʊ/ YOO-boh; born 25 March 1985) is an Aboriginal Australian (Nunggubuyu and Wanindilyakwa) politician. She has served as leader of the Labor Party and Leader of the Opposition in the Northern Territory since 3 September 2024, the first Aboriginal woman to lead a major political party in Australia. She is a Labor member of the Northern Territory Legislative Assembly since 2016, representing the electorate of Arnhem.

== Early life and career ==
Uibo was born in the Northern Territory. Her mother is a Nunggubuyu woman from Numbulwar and Wanindilyakwa from Groote Eylandt, both located in south-east Arnhem Land. Her father was born in Sydney and is of Estonian, Irish and South African descent.

Uibo went to school in Batchelor and Darwin and participated in many youth programs including the Aboriginal Islander Tertiary Aspirations Program, YMCA Youth Parliament and the National Youth Round Table.

Uibo graduated valedictorian from the University of Queensland with a Bachelor of Arts and Bachelor of Education (Secondary) in 2010. She began her teaching career at the Casuarina Senior College before moving to Numbulwar in 2012, where she was acting senior teacher.

In 2013 she won a Commonwealth Bank Foundation award for teaching financial literacy to her secondary students. Uibo also won the NT Award for Excellence in Teaching or Leadership in Aboriginal and Torres Strait Islander Education in both the Arnhem region and the Northern Territory.

== Politics ==
Northern Territory Legislative Assembly
Years	Term	Electoral division	Party
2016–2020	13th	Arnhem	Labor
2020–2024	14th	Arnhem	Labor
2024–present	15th	Arnhem	Labor

Uibo was elected into the Northern Territory Legislative Assembly in 2016 in the electoral division of Arnhem, previously held by Larisa Lee. She won the seat on 64 percent of the two-party vote, reverting Arnhem to its traditional status as a safe Labor seat. Lee, who served under three different banners during her tenure (Country Liberal, independent, Palmer United and independent again), won only 117 votes. Meanwhile, Uibo won 54 percent of the primary vote, enough to reclaim the seat for Labor without the need for preferences.

In a reshuffle of the Gunner Ministry on 26 June 2018, Uibo was promoted to the Cabinet of the Northern Territory as Minister for Education and Minister for Training.

On 31 January 2019, Uibo was additionally sworn in as Minister for Aboriginal Affairs.

The fourth Gunner ministry was announced on 7 September 2020, following the 2020 Northern Territory general election. Uibo continued as Minister for Aboriginal Affairs, and was appointed Attorney-General and Minister for Justice, Minister for Treaty and Local Decision Making, and Minister for Parks and Rangers.

On 3 September 2024 she was elected unopposed as the leader of the NT Labor Party and hence Leader of the Opposition with Dheran Young as her deputy.

On 22 May 2025 she referred “potential fraud and gross conflicts of interest” at the Darwin Waterfront Corporation involving the Chief Minister’s husband to Parliament’s public accounts committee, citing “serious allegations involving significant sums of public money”, which followed an independent MLA’s blocked attempt to introduce a motion calling for increased measures to prevent unchecked corruption from continuing.

== Political views ==
Uibo supports a woman's right to have an abortion. Additionally, Uibo supports voluntary assisted dying.

Political offices
Preceded by Lia Finocchiaro	Leader of the Opposition in the Northern Territory; 2024–present	Incumbent
Northern Territory Legislative Assembly
Preceded by Larisa Lee	Member for Arnhem; 2016–present	Incumbent
Party political offices
Preceded by Eva Lawler	Leader of the Territory Labor Party; 2024–present	Incumbent
