= Northern Territory Government =

Territory government of the Northern Territory, Australia

Overview
- Established: 1 January 1911 as an Australian territory; 1 July 1978 under responsible self-government
- Country: Australia
- Polity: Northern Territory
- Leader: Chief Minister (Lia Finocchiaro)
- Appointed by: Administrator (David Connolly) on behalf of the Governor-General (Sam Mostyn)
- Main organ: Executive Council of the Northern Territory (de jure); Cabinet of the Northern Territory (de facto)
- Ministries: 11 departments
- Responsible to: Parliament of the Northern Territory
- Annual budget: A$10 billion (2023–2024)
- Headquarters: Parliament House, Darwin
- Website: nt.gov.au

The Northern Territory Government is the executive branch of the Northern Territory. The Government of Northern Territory was formed in 1978 with the granting of self-government to the Territory. The Northern Territory is a territory of the Commonwealth of Australia, and the Constitution of Australia and Commonwealth law regulates its relationship with the Commonwealth.

Under the Australian Constitution, the Commonwealth has full legislative power, if it chooses to exercise it, over the Northern Territory, and has devolved self-government to the Territory. The Northern Territory legislature does not have the legislative independence of the Australian states but has power in all matters not in conflict with the Constitution and applicable Commonwealth laws, but subject to a Commonwealth veto.

Since 28 August 2024, the head of government is Chief Minister Lia Finocchiaro of the Country Liberal Party, following the election defeat of Eva Lawler as chief minister on 24 August 2024.

== Legislative powers ==
Legislative power rests with the Legislative Assembly, which consists of the Administrator of the Northern Territory and the members of the Assembly. While the Assembly exercises roughly the same powers as the state governments of Australia, it does so by a delegation of powers from the Commonwealth, rather than by any constitutional right. This means that the Australian Parliament retains the right to legislate for the Territory, if it chooses to exercise it. Under the law granting self-government to the Territory, the Federal Cabinet can advise the Governor-General of Australia to overturn any legislation passed by the Assembly. (See also Electoral systems of the Australian states and territories).

== Executive powers ==
The government consists of a Ministry appointed by the Administrator, from the elected members of the Assembly. The Administrator normally appoints the leader of the majority party in the Assembly as the Chief Minister. The other members of the ministry are appointed by the Administrator on the advice of the Chief Minister. The Northern Territory Government is a member of the Council of Australian Governments.

== Current ministries ==
=== Current composition ===
Minister	Office
Hon Lia Finocchiaro, MLA	Chief Minister; Minister for Police; Minister for Fire and Emergency Services; Minister for Defence NT; Minister for Territory Coordinator
Hon Gerard Maley, MLA	Deputy Chief Minister; Minister for Agribusiness and Fisheries; Minister for Mining and Energy; Minister for Corrections; Minister for Renewables; Minister for Recreational Fishing
Bill Yan	Treasurer; Minister of Logistics and Infrastructure; Minister of Housing Construction
Marie-Clare Boothby	Attorney-General; Minister for Tourism and Hospitality; Minister for Major Events; Minister for Parks and Wildlife; Minister for Racing
Steve Edgington	Minister for Health; Minister for Mental Health; Minister for Alcohol Policy; Minister for Aboriginal Affairs; Minister for Housing, Local Government and Community Development; Minister for Essential Services
Joshua Burgoyne	Minister for Lands, Planning and Environment; Minister for Corporate and Digital Development; Minister for Water Resources
Jo Hersey	Minister for Education and Training; Minister for Early Education; Minister for Service
Robyn Cahill	Minister for Trade, Business and Asian Relations; Minister for International Education, Migration, and Population; Minister for Workforce Development; Minister for Advanced Manufacturing; Minister for Children and Families; Minister for Child Protection; Minister for Prevention of Domestic Violence
Jinson Charls	Minister for People, Sport and Culture; Minister for Arts; Minister for Disability; Minister for Multicultural Affairs; Minister for Veterans

== See also ==
- Northern Territory of Australia Government Gazette
- Local Government Areas of the Northern Territory
