= Eva Lawler =

Australian politician (born 1962)

The Honourable Eva Lawler
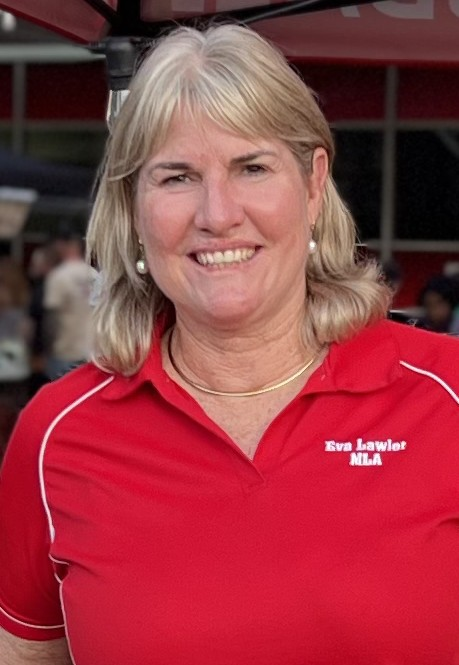

13th Chief Minister of the Northern Territory
- In office 21 December 2023 – 28 August 2024
- Deputy: Chansey Paech
- Administrator: Hugh Heggie
- Preceded by: Natasha Fyles
- Succeeded by: Lia Finocchiaro

Member of the Northern Territory Legislative Assembly for Drysdale
- In office 27 August 2016 – 24 August 2024
- Preceded by: Lia Finocchiaro
- Succeeded by: Clinton Howe

Personal details
- Born: Eva Dina Bilato; 18 August 1962 (age 64) Darwin, Northern Territory, Australia
- Party: Labor Party
- Spouse: Thomas Lawler (died 2018)
- Occupation: Schoolteacher; Politician

Eva Dina Lawler (née Bilato; born 18 August 1962) is an Australian former politician who served as the 13th chief minister of the Northern Territory from 2023 to 2024, holding office as the leader of the Territory Labor Party. She was a member of the Northern Territory Legislative Assembly (MLA) for the electorate of Drysdale from 2016 until her defeat at the 2024 Northern Territory general election. Before becoming chief minister she held various ministerial offices in the Gunner and Fyles governments.

== Early life and career ==
Lawler is the daughter of Valerie (née Riley) and Dino Bilato. Her family worked in trucking and earthmoving industries, servicing materials for government projects. Her father was an Italian immigrant who arrived in Australia in 1952 and moved to Darwin in the late 1950s.

At age 10 in 1972, she started playing hockey for the Palmerston RSL's hockey club, the Palmerston Saints. She and her family were evacuated after Cyclone Tracy in 1974, but returned to Darwin. She became a pioneer of women's hockey in the NT, playing in a number of inaugural NT women's hockey teams, such as the first NT schools team in 1977, women's under-19 side and NT senior women's team in 1980.

Lawler completed a Bachelor of Education at the then Darwin Community College. She taught at Berry Springs Primary School, Gray Primary School and Humpty Doo Primary School all in the surrounds of Darwin. She was promoted to assistant principal, working at Anula Primary School and then Principal at Jingili Primary School. While teaching, she continued her hockey career playing for the NT, as well as coaching with the Palmerston Saints Hockey Club (PSHC).

Her efforts were recognised with the Northern Territory Hockey Association (NTHA)’s Award of Merit and life membership of the PSHC in 1990, before being selected in the first Australian women's national hockey team in 1993, progressing to selector and high performance roles in the NTHA setup in 1996-97 and 2009 respectively. This fitted around her education career focusing on curriculum development and professional development of teachers, as well as work in event management in the Department of Sport.

She later gained master's degrees in education and international management, a diploma in project management and a graduate diploma in public sector management from Charles Darwin University, before moving to politics.

== Political career ==
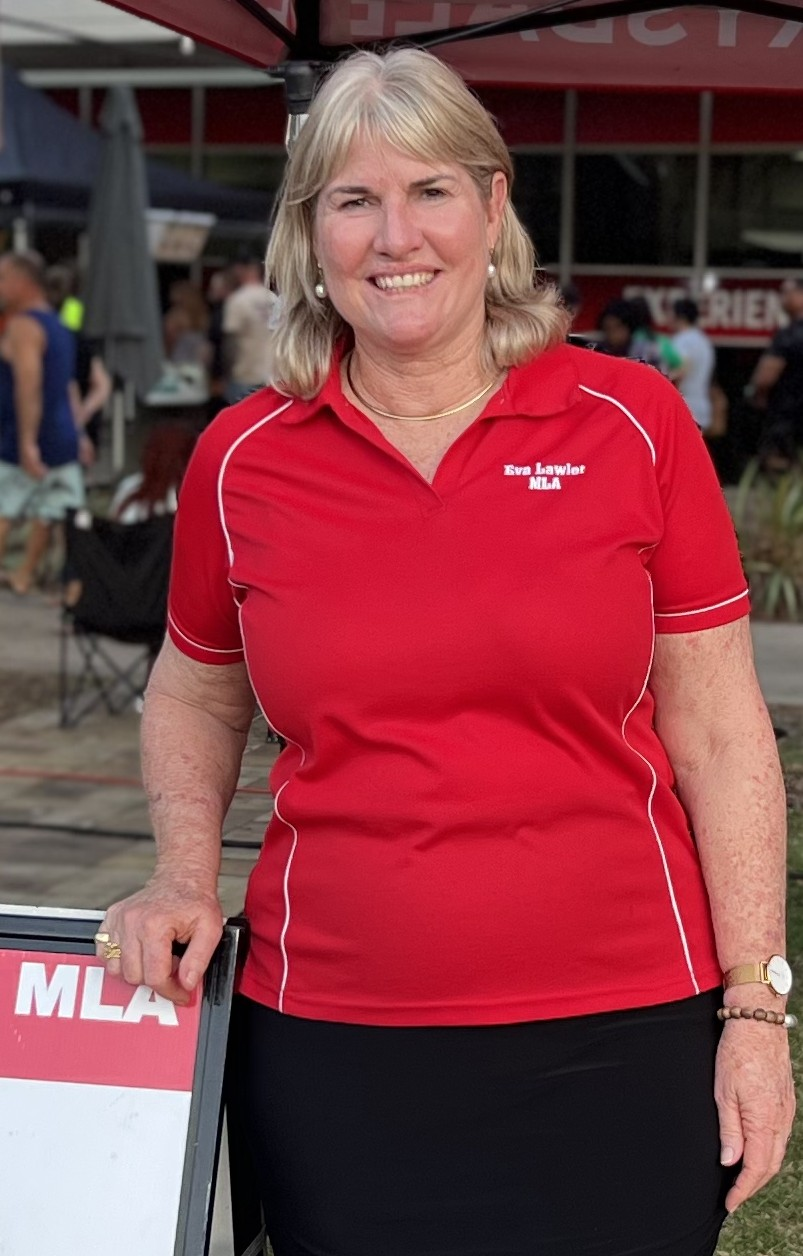
Lawler in 2023

Lawler seemingly faced long odds when she was nominated as Labor candidate in Drysdale for the 2016 election. The seat's then-Country Liberal Party incumbent, Lia Finocchiaro, opted to contest the new seat of Spillett after that seat absorbed much of her old base. Even after the redistribution, the downtown Palmerston seat still had a CLP majority of 11.5 percent, making it a comfortably safe Country Liberal seat on paper. Labor had only won the seat once, in its 2005 landslide when it took two seats in Palmerston—the only time it had won seats there prior to 2016. However, Labor had its majority in Drysdale redistributed away in 2008.

Northern Territory Legislative Assembly
Years	Term	Electoral division	Party
2016–2020	13th	Drysdale	Labor
2020–2024	14th	Drysdale	Labor

However, by the time the writs were dropped for the 2016 election, the CLP's support in Palmerston had collapsed. One poll had the CLP on only 37 percent support in an area that had been a CLP stronghold for the better part of four decades. On election night, the CLP's primary vote collapsed by over 20 percent, and Lawler took the seat on a swing of over 16 percent.

On 11 September 2016, Lawler was named to cabinet as Minister for Education. She was re-elected in 2020 with a small swing in her favour, becoming the first Labor MP to win a second term in a Palmerston-based seat.

=== Chief Minister ===
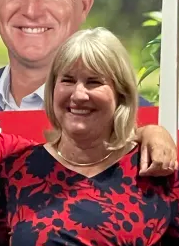
Lawler at the launch of the 2024 election campaign

On 20 December 2023, Lawler was elected unopposed to succeed Natasha Fyles, who resigned after a controversy regarding undisclosed shares. Chansey Paech was elected as Deputy Chief Minister.

In 2024, Lawler announced the first of the 2024 Alice Springs curfews and the curfew legislation.

She lost her seat to Country Liberal Party candidate Clinton Howe in the 2024 Northern Territory general election. Amid Labor's collapse in Darwin/Palmerston, she lost 12 percent of her primary vote from 2020 and suffered a two-party swing of 21 percent. All but two members of her cabinet were defeated. Lawler is the third Territory head of government to be rolled in their own seat.

== Personal life ==
Lawler had two children with her husband Thomas 'Tom' Lawler, a professional firefighter. He also played for the Darwin Football Club in the Northern Territory Football League (NTFL) in the club's 1979–80 and 1988–89 premierships.

Her husband was diagnosed with leukaemia in 2006, which was attributed to carcinogens found in firefighting foams, and subsequently led a campaign for firefighters to receive compensation. He died of cancer in 2018.

Northern Territory Legislative Assembly
Preceded by Lia Finocchiaro	Member for Drysdale; 2016–2024	Succeeded by Clinton Howe
Political offices
Preceded by Peter Chandler	Minister for Education; 2016–2018	Succeeded by Selena Uibo
Preceded by Natasha Fyles	Treasurer of the Northern Territory; 2023–2024	Succeeded by Lia Finocchiaro
Preceded by Natasha Fyles	Chief Minister of the Northern Territory; 2023–2024	Succeeded by Lia Finocchiaro
Party political offices
Preceded by Natasha Fyles	Leader of the Territory Labor Party; 2023–2024	Succeeded by Selena Uibo
