= Electoral results for the division of Fong Lim =

This is a list of electoral results for the Electoral division of Fong Lim in Northern Territory elections.

== Members for Fong Lim ==
Member	Party	Term
Dave Tollner	Country Liberal	2008–2016
Jeff Collins	Labor	2016–2018
Jeff Collins	Independent	2018–2020
Jeff Collins	Territory Alliance	2020
Mark Monaghan	Labor	2020–present

== Election results ==
=== Elections in the 2000s ===
2008 Northern Territory general election: Fong Lim
Party	Candidate	Votes	%	±%
Country Liberal	Dave Tollner	1,831	52.1	+13.6
Labor	Matthew Bonson	1,685	47.9	−13.6
Total formal votes		3,516	94.8	−1.7
Informal votes		191	5.2	+1.7
Turnout		3,707	75.9	−7.2
Country Liberal gain from Labor		Swing	+13.6	

=== Elections in the 2010s ===
2012 Northern Territory general election: Fong Lim
Party	Candidate	Votes	%	±%
Country Liberal	Dave Tollner	2,050	54.5	+2.4
Labor	Ashley Marsh	1,348	35.8	−12.1
Greens	Matt Haubrick	250	6.6	+6.6
Sex Party	Peter Burnheim	113	3.0	+3.0
Total formal votes		3,761	97.0	+2.2
Informal votes		116	3.0	−2.2
Turnout		3,877	79.4	+3.5
Two-party-preferred result
Country Liberal	Dave Tollner	2,154	57.3	+5.2
Labor	Ashley Marsh	1,607	42.7	−5.2
Country Liberal hold		Swing	+5.2	

2016 Northern Territory general election: Fong Lim
Party	Candidate	Votes	%	±%
Labor	Jeff Collins	1,802	45.3	+3.3
Country Liberal	Tim Dixon	1,439	36.1	−11.4
Independent	Ilana Eldridge	384	9.6	+9.6
1 Territory	Sue Fraser-Adams	356	8.9	+8.9
Total formal votes		3,981	98.2	+1.0
Informal votes		74	1.8	−1.0
Turnout		4,055	75.8	+3.9
Two-party-preferred result
Labor	Jeff Collins	2,171	57.8	+7.9
Country Liberal	Tim Dixon	1,588	42.2	−7.9
Labor gain from Country Liberal		Swing	+7.9	

=== Elections in the 2020s ===
2020 Northern Territory general election: Fong Lim
Party	Candidate	Votes	%	±%
Labor	Mark Monaghan	1,756	42.1	−1.9
Country Liberal	Kylie Bonanni	1,488	35.6	−2.3
Territory Alliance	Jeff Collins	497	11.9	+11.9
Independent	Amye Un	434	10.4	+10.4
Total formal votes		4,175	97.0	N/A
Informal votes		130	3.0	N/A
Turnout		4,305	77.5	N/A
Two-party-preferred result
Labor	Mark Monaghan	2,197	52.6	−3.0
Country Liberal	Kylie Bonanni	1,978	47.4	+3.0
Labor hold		Swing	−3.0	

2024 Northern Territory general election: Fong Lim
Party	Candidate	Votes	%	±%
Country Liberal	Tanzil Rahman	2,050	48.5	+12.1
Labor	Mark Monaghan	1,174	27.8	−14.0
Greens	Simon Niblock	672	15.9	+15.9
Independent	Amye Un	329	7.8	−2.2
Total formal votes		4,225	97.7	+0.2
Informal votes		118	2.7	−0.2
Turnout		4,343	76.5	
Two-party-preferred result
Country Liberal	Tanzil Rahman	2,428	57.5	+9.6
Labor	Mark Monaghan	1,791	42.5	−9.6
Country Liberal gain from Labor		Swing	+9.6	
