= Results of the 2020 Northern Territory general election =

This is a list of electoral division results for the Northern Territory 2020 general election.

== Results summary ==
Legislative Assembly (IRV) – Turnout 74.9% (CV)
Party	Candidates	First votes	%	+/-	Seats	+/-
Labor	25	40,291	39.4	–2.8	14	▼4
Country Liberal	24	32,021	31.3	−0.5	8	▲6
Territory Alliance	21	13,184	12.9	+12.9	1	▲1
Independents	25	10,977	10.7	−8.1	2	▼3
Greens	10	4,453	4.4	+1.5	0	Steady
Australian Federation	4	942	0.9	0.1	0	Steady
Ban Fracking Fix Crime Protect Water	1	226	0.2	−3.4 (Note: Figure based on 2016 total for the 1 Territory Party, from which Ban Fracking Fix Crime Protect Water was renamed.)	0	Steady
Animal Justice	1	78	0.1	+0.1	0	Steady
Formal votes		102,172	96.5	−1.5		
Informal votes		3,661	3.5	+1.5		
Total	111	105,833	100		25	
Registered voters / turnout		141,255	74.9	+0.9		

== Results by electoral division ==
=== Arafura ===
2020 Northern Territory general election: Arafura
Party	Candidate	Votes	%	±%
Labor	Lawrence Costa	1,269	49.0	+0.6
Country Liberal	Gibson Illortaminni	1,041	40.2	+4.4
Independent	Tristan Mungatopi	199	7.7	+3.5
Territory Alliance	George Laughton	82	3.2	+3.2
Total formal votes		2,591	94.8	N/A
Informal votes		142	5.2	N/A
Turnout		2,733	52.7	N/A
Two-party-preferred result
Labor	Lawrence Costa	1,388	53.6	−3.7
Country Liberal	Gibson Illortaminni	1,203	46.4	+3.7
Labor hold		Swing	−3.7	

=== Araluen ===
2020 Northern Territory general election: Araluen
Party	Candidate	Votes	%	±%
Country Liberal	Damien Ryan	1,659	38.0	+1.6
Territory Alliance	Robyn Lambley	1,276	29.2	−10.5
Labor	Jackson Ankers	789	18.1	−5.8
Greens	Bernard Hickey	455	10.4	+10.4
Federation	Domenico Pecorari	114	2.6	+2.6
Independent	Wayne Wright	71	1.6	+1.6
Total formal votes		4,364	96.5	N/A
Informal votes		157	3.5	N/A
Turnout		4,521	78.7	N/A
Two-party-preferred result (Note: Estimated two-party count by Antony Green.)
Country Liberal	Damien Ryan	2,732	62.6	+6.9
Labor	Jackson Ankers	1,632	37.4	−6.9
Two-candidate-preferred result
Territory Alliance	Robyn Lambley	2,203	50.5	−8.1
Country Liberal	Damien Ryan	2,161	49.5	+8.1
Territory Alliance hold		Swing	−8.1	

=== Arnhem ===
2020 Northern Territory general election: Arnhem
Party	Candidate	Votes	%	±%
Labor	Selena Uibo	1,207	41.3	−8.6
Independent	Ian Mongunu Gumbula	987	33.8	+33.8
Country Liberal	Jerry Amato	487	16.7	−13.5
Independent	Lance Lawrence	243	8.3	−2.6
Total formal votes		2,924	92.6	N/A
Informal votes		232	7.4	N/A
Turnout		3,156	58.1	N/A
Two-party-preferred result (Note: Estimated two-party count by Antony Green.)
Labor	Selena Uibo	1,977	67.6	+7.1
Country Liberal	Jerry Amato	947	32.4	−7.1
Two-candidate-preferred result
Labor	Selena Uibo	1,504	51.4	−9.1
Independent	Ian Mongunu Gumbula	1,420	48.6	+48.6
Labor hold		Swing	−9.1	

=== Barkly ===
2020 Northern Territory general election: Barkly
Party	Candidate	Votes	%	±%
Country Liberal	Steve Edgington	1,431	41.6	+24.6
Labor	Sid Vashist	1,238	36.0	−12.6
Independent	Gadrian Hoosan	663	19.3	+19.3
Independent	Daniel Mulholland	109	3.2	+3.2
Total formal votes		3,441	95.7	N/A
Informal votes		156	4.3	N/A
Turnout		3,597	63.2	N/A
Two-party-preferred result
Country Liberal	Steve Edgington	1,723	50.1	+15.9
Labor	Sid Vashist	1,718	49.9	−15.9
Country Liberal gain from Labor		Swing	+15.9	

=== Blain ===
2020 Northern Territory general election: Blain
Party	Candidate	Votes	%	±%
Labor	Mark Turner	1,729	41.4	+4.0
Country Liberal	Matthew Kerle	1,489	35.6	+10.2
Territory Alliance	Terry Mills	959	23.0	−8.5
Total formal votes		4,177	96.8	N/A
Informal votes		138	3.2	N/A
Turnout		4,315	75.8	N/A
Two-party-preferred result
Labor	Mark Turner	2,095	50.2	+1.5
Country Liberal	Matthew Kerle	2,082	49.8	−1.5
Labor gain from Territory Alliance		Swing	+1.5	

=== Braitling ===
2020 Northern Territory general election: Braitling
Party	Candidate	Votes	%	±%
Country Liberal	Joshua Burgoyne	1,548	35.2	−4.3
Labor	Dale Wakefield	993	22.6	−11.2
Independent	Kim Hopper	648	14.7	+14.7
Territory Alliance	Dale McIver	488	11.1	+11.1
Greens	Chris Tomlins	379	8.6	−2.3
Independent	Scott McConnell	199	4.5	+4.5
Federation	Marli Banks	140	3.2	+3.2
Total formal votes		4,395	97.0	N/A
Informal votes		137	3.0	N/A
Turnout		4,532	77.7	N/A
Two-party-preferred result
Country Liberal	Joshua Burgoyne	2,256	51.3	+4.3
Labor	Dale Wakefield	2,139	48.7	−4.3
Country Liberal gain from Labor		Swing	+4.3	

=== Brennan ===
2020 Northern Territory general election: Brennan
Party	Candidate	Votes	%	±%
Labor	Tony Sievers	1,760	40.2	−7.2
Country Liberal	Marie-Clare Boothby	1,730	39.5	−3.9
Territory Alliance	Abraham Mbemap	477	10.9	+10.9
Independent	Peter Chandler	413	9.4	+9.4
Total formal votes		4,380	96.8	N/A
Informal votes		146	3.2	N/A
Turnout		4,526	78.8	N/A
Two-party-preferred result
Country Liberal	Marie-Clare Boothby	2,242	51.2	+3.8
Labor	Tony Sievers	2,138	48.8	−3.8
Country Liberal gain from Labor		Swing	+3.8	

=== Casuarina ===
2020 Northern Territory general election: Casuarina
Party	Candidate	Votes	%	±%
Labor	Lauren Moss	2,307	50.1	−11.0
Country Liberal	Tony Schelling	1,012	22.0	−16.3
Territory Alliance	Danial Kelly	730	15.9	+15.9
Greens	Kendall Trudgen	552	12.0	+11.6
Total formal votes		4,601	97.5	N/A
Informal votes		117	2.5	N/A
Turnout		4,718	83.5	N/A
Two-party-preferred result
Labor	Lauren Moss	3,033	65.9	+4.4
Country Liberal	Tony Schelling	1,568	34.1	−4.4
Labor hold		Swing	+4.4	

=== Daly ===
2020 Northern Territory general election: Daly
Party	Candidate	Votes	%	±%
Country Liberal	Ian Sloan	1,386	35.8	−6.1
Labor	Anthony Venes	1,321	34.1	−2.7
Territory Alliance	Regina McCarthy	708	18.3	+18.3
Greens	Will Kemp	324	8.4	+8.4
Independent	Mick Denigan	135	3.5	+3.5
Total formal votes		3,874	93.8	N/A
Informal votes		257	6.2	N/A
Turnout		4,131	73.5	N/A
Two-party-preferred result
Country Liberal	Ian Sloan	1,984	51.2	−0.5
Labor	Anthony Venes	1,890	48.8	+0.5
Country Liberal hold		Swing	−0.5	

=== Drysdale ===
2020 Northern Territory general election: Drysdale
Party	Candidate	Votes	%	±%
Labor	Eva Lawler	1,648	42.2	+1.2
Country Liberal	Leanne Butler	1,023	26.2	−8.3
Territory Alliance	Fiona Lynch	533	13.6	+13.6
Ban Fracking Fix Crime Protect Water	Lash Lisson	226	5.8	+5.8
Independent	Danielle Eveleigh	211	5.4	+5.4
Independent	Raj Samson	179	4.6	+4.6
Independent	Brendan Killalea	85	2.2	+2.2
Total formal votes		3,905	95.0	N/A
Informal votes		204	5.0	N/A
Turnout		4,109	70.5	N/A
Two-party-preferred result
Labor	Eva Lawler	2,263	58.0	+2.7
Country Liberal	Leanne Butler	1,642	42.0	−2.7
Labor hold		Swing	+2.7	

=== Fannie Bay ===
2020 Northern Territory general election: Fannie Bay
Party	Candidate	Votes	%	±%
Labor	Michael Gunner	2,095	48.2	−8.2
Country Liberal	Tracey Hayes	1,510	34.8	+1.0
Greens	Peter Robertson	444	10.2	+10.2
Territory Alliance	Rebecca Jennings	242	5.6	+5.6
Independent	Mark Mackenzie	54	1.2	+1.2
Total formal votes		4,345	98.1	N/A
Informal votes		85	1.9	N/A
Turnout		4,430	80.9	N/A
Two-party-preferred result
Labor	Michael Gunner	2,589	59.6	−2.9
Country Liberal	Tracey Hayes	1,756	40.4	+2.9
Labor hold		Swing	−2.9	

=== Fong Lim ===
2020 Northern Territory general election: Fong Lim
Party	Candidate	Votes	%	±%
Labor	Mark Monaghan	1,756	42.1	−1.9
Country Liberal	Kylie Bonanni	1,488	35.6	−2.3
Territory Alliance	Jeff Collins	497	11.9	+11.9
Independent	Amye Un	434	10.4	+10.4
Total formal votes		4,175	97.0	N/A
Informal votes		130	3.0	N/A
Turnout		4,305	77.5	N/A
Two-party-preferred result
Labor	Mark Monaghan	2,197	52.6	−3.0
Country Liberal	Kylie Bonanni	1,978	47.4	+3.0
Labor hold		Swing	−3.0	

=== Goyder ===
2020 Northern Territory general election: Goyder
Party	Candidate	Votes	%	±%
Independent	Kezia Purick	1,459	31.1	−23.9
Country Liberal	Phil Battye	1,289	27.5	+7.2
Territory Alliance	Rachael Wright	614	13.1	+13.1
Labor	Mick Taylor	590	12.6	−6.4
Independent	Pauline Cass	283	6.0	+6.0
Independent	Ted Warren	249	5.3	+5.3
Greens	Karen Fletcher	147	3.1	−1.0
Independent	Trevor Jenkins	64	1.4	+1.4
Total formal votes		4,695	96.1	N/A
Informal votes		189	3.9	N/A
Turnout		4,884	87.5	N/A
Two-party-preferred result (Note: Estimated two-party count by Antony Green.)
Country Liberal	Phil Battye	3,024	64.4	+16.4
Labor	Mick Taylor	1,671	35.6	−16.4
Two-candidate-preferred result
Independent	Kezia Purick	2,665	56.8	−18.5
Country Liberal	Phil Battye	2,030	43.2	+18.5
Independent hold		Swing	−18.5	

=== Gwoja ===
2020 Northern Territory general election: Gwoja
Party	Candidate	Votes	%	±%
Labor	Chansey Paech	1,612	60.6	−2.1
Country Liberal	Phillip Alice	702	26.4	+3.9
Federation	Kenny Lechleitner	344	12.9	+12.9
Total formal votes		2,658	94.7	N/A
Informal votes		148	5.3	N/A
Turnout		2,806	52.8	N/A
Two-party-preferred result
Labor	Chansey Paech	1,729	65.0	−7.1
Country Liberal	Phillip Alice	929	35.0	+7.1
Labor hold		Swing	−7.1	

=== Johnston ===
2020 Northern Territory general election: Johnston
Party	Candidate	Votes	%	±%
Labor	Joel Bowden	1,940	45.3	−7.7
Country Liberal	Gary Haslett	843	19.7	−10.7
Greens	Aiya Goodrich Carttling	736	17.2	+1.9
Territory Alliance	Steven Klose	626	14.6	+14.6
Independent	Joshua Thomas	139	3.2	+3.2
Total formal votes		4,284	96.6	N/A
Informal votes		150	3.4	N/A
Turnout		4,434	79.8	N/A
Two-party-preferred result
Labor	Joel Bowden	2,851	66.5	+0.8
Country Liberal	Gary Haslett	1,433	33.5	−0.8
Labor hold		Swing	+0.8	

=== Karama ===
2020 Northern Territory general election: Karama
Party	Candidate	Votes	%	±%
Labor	Ngaree Ah Kit	2,129	51.1	+17.2
Country Liberal	Brian O'Gallagher	1,166	28.0	+4.4
Territory Alliance	Caleb Cardno	874	21.0	+21.0
Total formal votes		4,169	97.1	N/A
Informal votes		124	2.9	N/A
Turnout		4,293	78.3	N/A
Two-party-preferred result
Labor	Ngaree Ah Kit	2,491	59.8	−2.5
Country Liberal	Brian O'Gallagher	1,678	40.2	+2.5
Labor hold		Swing	−2.5	

=== Katherine ===
2020 Northern Territory general election: Katherine
Party	Candidate	Votes	%	±%
Labor	Kate Ganley	1,281	33.0	+2.1
Country Liberal	Jo Hersey	1,264	32.5	−1.7
Territory Alliance	Melanie Usher	1,132	29.1	+29.1
Independent	Clinton Booth	209	5.4	+5.4
Total formal votes		3,886	96.3	N/A
Informal votes		151	3.7	N/A
Turnout		4,037	70.2	N/A
Two-party-preferred result
Country Liberal	Jo Hersey	2,041	52.5	+4.1
Labor	Kate Ganley	1,845	47.5	−4.1
Country Liberal gain from Labor		Swing	+4.1	

=== Mulka ===
2020 Northern Territory general election: Mulka
Party	Candidate	Votes	%	±%
Independent	Yingiya Mark Guyula	2,252	55.0	+13.5
Labor	Lynne Walker	1,843	45.0	+0.6
Total formal votes		4,095	97.7	N/A
Informal votes		96	2.3	N/A
Turnout		4,191	68.4	N/A
Independent hold		Swing	+13.5	

=== Namatjira ===
2020 Northern Territory general election: Namatjira
Party	Candidate	Votes	%	±%
Country Liberal	Bill Yan	1,066	29.6	−14.0
Labor	Sheralee Taylor	977	27.1	−8.2
Territory Alliance	Matt Paterson	809	22.4	+22.4
Federation	Catherine Satour	344	9.5	+9.5
Greens	Nikki McCoy	279	7.7	−1.5
Independent	Tony Willis	131	3.6	+3.6
Total formal votes		3,606	95.2	N/A
Informal votes		180	4.8	N/A
Turnout		3,786	66.1	N/A
Two-party-preferred result
Country Liberal	Bill Yan	1,814	50.3	−1.7
Labor	Sheralee Taylor	1,792	49.7	+1.7
Country Liberal notional hold		Swing	−1.7	

=== Nelson ===
2020 Northern Territory general election: Nelson
Party	Candidate	Votes	%	±%
Country Liberal	Gerard Maley	2,302	50.5	+28.3
Independent	Beverley Ratahi	1,351	29.6	+29.6
Labor	Steve Asher	488	10.7	−0.3
Territory Alliance	Andy Harley	420	9.2	+9.2
Total formal votes		4,561	96.9	N/A
Informal votes		146	3.1	N/A
Turnout		4,707	85.5	N/A
Two-party-preferred result (Note: Estimated two-party count by Antony Green.)
Country Liberal	Gerard Maley	3,320	72.8	+15.8
Labor	Steve Asher	1,241	27.2	−15.8
Two-candidate-preferred result
Country Liberal	Gerard Maley	2,657	58.3	+31.2
Independent	Beverley Ratahi	1,904	41.7	+41.7
Country Liberal gain from Independent		Swing	+31.2	

=== Nightcliff ===
2020 Northern Territory general election: Nightcliff
Party	Candidate	Votes	%	±%
Labor	Natasha Fyles	2,353	53.2	−8.0
Country Liberal	Steve Doherty	836	18.9	−2.4
Greens	Billee McGinley	822	18.6	+1.7
Territory Alliance	Melita McKinnon	336	7.6	+7.6
Animal Justice	Shelley Landmark	78	1.8	+1.2
Total formal votes		4,425	98.0	N/A
Informal votes		90	2.0	N/A
Turnout		4,515	80.3	N/A
Two-party-preferred result
Labor	Natasha Fyles	3,286	74.3	−2.5
Country Liberal	Steve Doherty	1,139	25.7	+2.5
Labor hold		Swing	−2.5	

=== Port Darwin ===
2020 Northern Territory general election: Port Darwin
Party	Candidate	Votes	%	±%
Country Liberal	Toby George	1,625	37.8	+1.5
Labor	Paul Kirby	1,611	37.5	−1.0
Territory Alliance	Gary Strachan	540	12.6	+12.6
Greens	Timothy Parish	315	7.3	+7.3
Independent	Leah Potter	210	4.9	+4.9
Total formal votes		4,301	97.5	N/A
Informal votes		112	2.5	N/A
Turnout		4,413	77.4	N/A
Two-party-preferred result
Labor	Paul Kirby	2,233	51.9	−0.9
Country Liberal	Toby George	2,068	48.1	+0.9
Labor hold		Swing	−0.9	

=== Sanderson ===
2020 Northern Territory general election: Sanderson
Party	Candidate	Votes	%	±%
Labor	Kate Worden	2,632	59.9	+7.6
Country Liberal	Derek Mayger	968	22.0	−13.4
Territory Alliance	Amelia Nuku	795	18.1	+18.1
Total formal votes		4,395	97.6	N/A
Informal votes		107	2.4	N/A
Turnout		4,502	82.6	N/A
Two-party-preferred result
Labor	Kate Worden	3,044	69.3	+8.7
Country Liberal	Derek Mayger	1,351	30.7	−8.7
Labor hold		Swing	+8.7	

=== Spillett ===
2020 Northern Territory general election: Spillett
Party	Candidate	Votes	%	±%
Country Liberal	Lia Finocchiaro	2,921	59.0	−0.1
Labor	Tristan Sloan	1,594	32.2	+2.9
Territory Alliance	Vanessa Mounsey	434	8.8	+8.8
Total formal votes		4,949	97.5	N/A
Informal votes		126	2.5	N/A
Turnout		5,075	86.6	N/A
Two-party-preferred result
Country Liberal	Lia Finocchiaro	3,219	65.0	−0.3
Labor	Tristan Sloan	1,730	35.0	+0.3
Country Liberal hold		Swing	−0.3	

=== Wanguri ===
2020 Northern Territory general election: Wanguri
Party	Candidate	Votes	%	±%
Labor	Nicole Manison	3,129	62.9	+4.3
Country Liberal	Jed Hansen	1,235	24.8	+1.2
Territory Alliance	Michael Best	612	12.3	+12.3
Total formal votes		4,976	97.2	N/A
Informal votes		141	2.8	N/A
Turnout		5,117	83.7	N/A
Two-party-preferred result
Labor	Nicole Manison	3,349	67.3	−2.6
Country Liberal	Jed Hansen	1,627	32.7	+2.6
Labor hold		Swing	−2.6	

== Results by region ==
Two-party-preferred vote by region (Note: Estimated two-party count by Antony Green.)
Region	TPP		Swing (to ALP)
Region	ALP	CLP	Swing (to ALP)
Darwin CBD	54.7%	45.3%	–2.5
Northern Darwin	67.2%	32.8%	+1.0
Palmerston	47.2%	52.8%	–2.7
Greater Darwin	58.3%	41.7%	–1.2
Regional/Remote NT	46.4%	53.6%	–7.5
Total	53.3%	46.7%	–3.9
