= 2020 Northern Territory opposition leadership dispute =

- Part of 13th Northern Territory Legislative Assembly
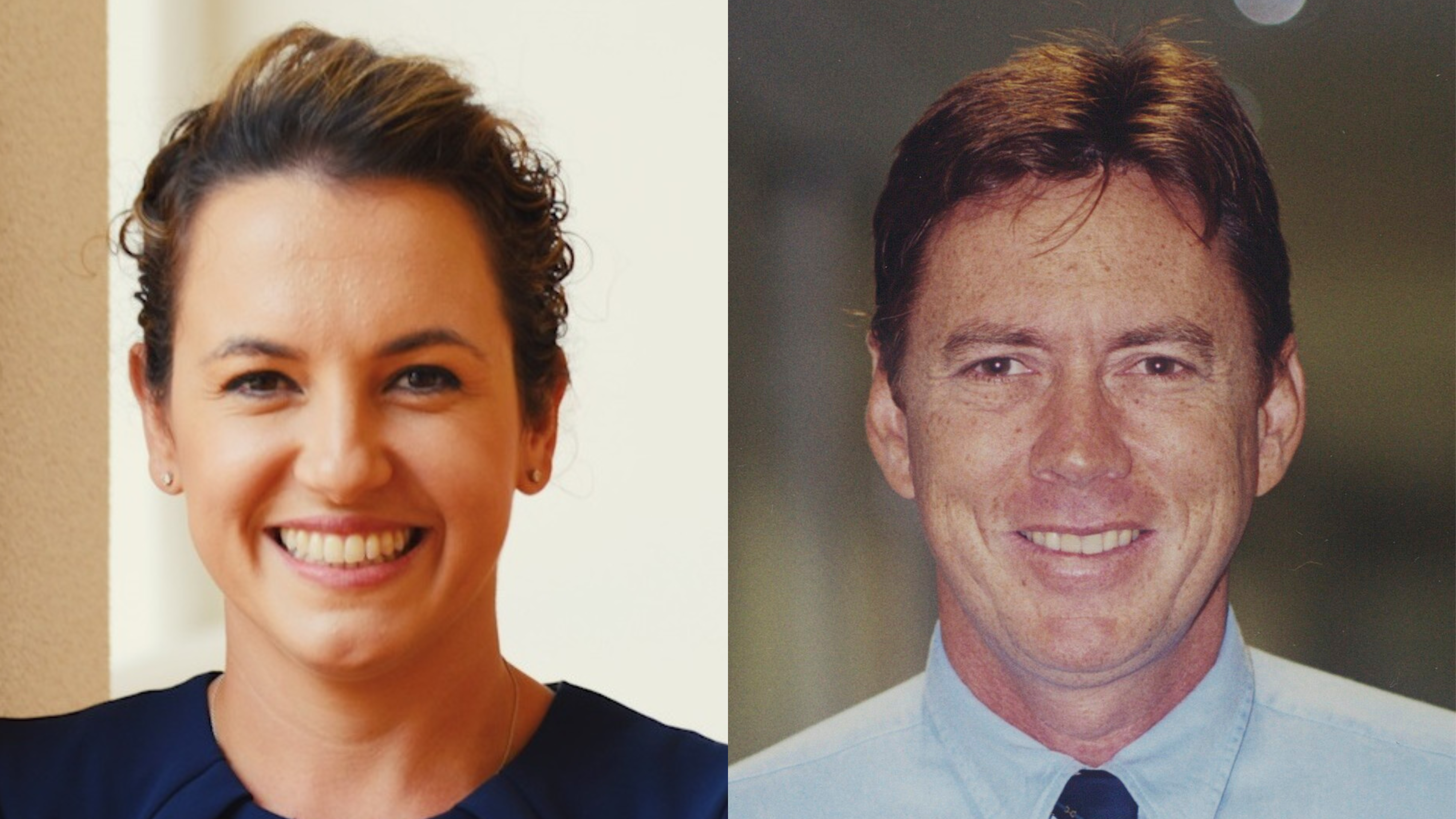
- Lia Finocchiaro and Terry Mills
- Date: 18–24 March 2020
- Result: CLP opposition status retained

Parties
| Country Liberal Party | Territory Alliance |

Lead figures
| Lia Finocchiaro | Terry Mills |

The 2020 Northern Territory opposition leadership dispute occurred in March 2020 in the Northern Territory Legislative Assembly, the unicameral legislature of Australia’s Northern Territory (NT).

Territory Alliance (TA) claimed to have become the official opposition after surpassing the Country Liberal Party (CLP) in parliamentary seat numbers. However, no motion acknowledging a change was passed by the parliament, and the CLP retained its opposition status after a week-long dispute.

This would have been the only time in the history of the Legislative Assembly that the title of opposition leader was not held by a member of the CLP or the Australian Labor Party (ALP).

== Background ==
=== 2016 election ===
The 2016 NT election resulted in a landslide victory for the Labor Party led by Michael Gunner, which won 18 out of 25 seats in parliament. The CLP, which came to power in 2012, was reduced to just two seats (Gary Higgins in Daly and Lia Finocchiaro in Spillett). Five independents were elected.

It was suggested that the independents would obtain opposition status, however the Office of the Clerk and the Solicitor-General of the NT stated that an alliance of independents "could not be recognised as an opposition because it could not form an alternative government". Five days after the election, Higgins was announced as the new leader of the CLP, replacing Adam Giles (who lost his seat of Braitling).

=== Opposition alliance bid ===
In February 2019, three independents – Terry Mills, Robyn Lambley and Yingiya Mark Guyula – established a formal alliance, seeking to become the official opposition. The request was denied by Kezia Purick, the Speaker of the Legislative Assembly.

=== Territory Alliance dispute ===
Mills established Territory Alliance (TA) on 31 August 2019. On 10 March 2020, independent MLA Jeff Collins (who resigned from Labor in 2019) joined TA, giving the party two seats in parliament and bringing it level with the CLP. Amid speculation that TA could become the official opposition, Lambley stated she would not join the party because "it doesn't resonate with my community", but would support Mills in a vote to become opposition leader.

On 18 March 2020, Lambley joined Territory Alliance, giving the party a third seat which surpassed the CLP. In a statement released at 3.42pm ACST the same day, Territory Alliance said it had been granted official opposition status by the Legislative Assembly. According to Lambley, Legislative Assembly clerk Michael Tatham told her "you are the opposition" and the CLP would have to vacate the opposition leader's office. Lia Finocchiaro, who replaced Higgins as CLP leader in February 2020, said she was "awaiting advice".

Despite this, no motion acknowledging a change was passed by the parliament, with Finocchiaro continuing to be referred to as opposition leader in Hansard following Lambley's defection. On 23 March 2020, the NT Parliament website named Mills as the leader of the opposition, Lambley as the deputy leader of the opposition, and Collins as the opposition whip. Mills was also referred to as the opposition leader by Gunner and several media outlets.

Mills presented a shadow cabinet on 24 March 2020, but Finocchiaro moved on the same day the office of opposition leader be declared vacant as it was "unclear" who the "official opposition" was, and that a secret ballot between the two be held to determine opposition status. Finocchiaro won the ballot 5–3, with Labor MLAs not voting. Independent MLA Gerry Wood publicly supported the CLP returning to opposition status.

== Aftermath ==
At the NT election held on 22 August 2020, Labor retained government with a reduced majority, while the CLP won eight seats. Territory Alliance received 12.9% of the territory-wide vote but only won a single seat (Lambley in Araluen), with Mills and Collins both losing their seats.

Lambley resigned from Territory Alliance on 21 October 2020, with the party dissolving before the end of the year.

== See also ==
- 2020 Northern Territory general election
