= Opinion polling for the 2020 Northern Territory general election =

In the lead-up to the 2020 Northern Territory general election, a number of polling companies conducted opinion polls. These polls collected data on parties' primary vote, leaders' favourability, and individual electoral division results.

== Voting intention ==
Date	Firm	Sample size	Primary vote						2PP vote	
Date	Firm	Sample size	ALP	CLP	TA	GRN	OTH	UND	ALP	CLP
22 Aug 2020	2020 election		39.4%	31.3%	12.9%	4.5%	12.0%	—	53.3%	46.7%
29 Jun 2020	uComms	699	33.9%	29.4%	10.7%	5.9%	7.4%	12.7%	50.8%	49.2%
May–Jun 2020	MediaReach (Note: Estimated by Kevin Bonham based on individual seat polling.)	4,000	36.2%	23%	26.8%	—N/a	14%	—N/a	—N/a	—N/a
18–24 Mar 2020	Disputed opposition leadership after Territory Alliance surpassed CLP in seat numbers									
1 Feb 2020	Lia Finocchiaro becomes CLP leader and leader of the opposition									
Sep 2019	MediaReach	645	29%	39%	—N/a	—N/a	22%	—N/a	—N/a	—N/a
31 Aug 2019	Terry Mills announces formation of Territory Alliance									
6 Oct 2018	Unnamed (Note: Commissioned by the Labor Party.)	—	—N/a	—N/a	—N/a	—N/a	—N/a	—N/a	53%	47%
25–27 Aug 2017	MediaReach	1,425	43%	38%	—N/a	—N/a	19%	—N/a	50%	50%
27 Aug 2016	2016 election		42.2%	31.8%	—	2.9%	23.1%	—	57.5%	42.5%

== Leadership approval ==
=== Preferred chief minister ===
Date	Firm	Sample size	Party leaders				Net
Date	Firm	Sample size	Gunner	Higgins	Mills	Unsure	Net
Sep 2019	MediaReach	645	30%	20%	38%	12%	8%
6 Oct 2018	Unnamed	—	—N/a	—N/a	—N/a	—N/a	12%
25–27 Aug 2017	MediaReach	1,425	34%	21%	—N/a	45%	13%

== Individual seat polling ==
=== Araluen ===
Date	Firm	Sample size	Primary vote						2CP vote	
Date	Firm	Sample size	TA	CLP	ALP	GRN	OTH	UND	TA	CLP
22 Aug 2020	2020 election		29.2%	38.0%	18.1%	10.4%	4.2%	—	50.5%	49.5%
May–Jun 2020	MediaReach	200	37%	27%	20%	—N/a	3%	13%	—N/a	—N/a
18 Mar 2020	Robyn Lambley joins Territory Alliance									
27 Aug 2016	2016 election		38.9%	36.4%	24.7%	—	—	—	58.2%	41.8%

=== Braitling ===
Date	Firm	Sample size	Primary vote						2CP vote	
Date	Firm	Sample size	CLP	ALP	TA	GRN	OTH	UND	ALP	CLP
22 Aug 2020	2020 election		35.2%	22.6%	11.1%	8.6%	22.4%	—	48.7%	51.3%
May–Jun 2020	MediaReach	200	18%	30%	31%	—N/a	3%	19%	—N/a	—N/a
27 Aug 2016	2016 election		42.8%	32.8%	—	10.1%	14.4%	—	50.3%	49.7%

=== Blain ===
Date	Firm	Sample size	Primary vote					2PP vote		
Date	Firm	Sample size	ALP	TA	CLP	OTH	UND	ALP	CLP	TA
22 Aug 2020	2020 election		41.4%	23.0%	35.6%	—	—	50.2%	49.8%	—
May–Jun 2020	MediaReach	200	25%	39%	23%	9%	4%	—N/a	—N/a	—N/a
31 Aug 2019	Terry Mills announces formation of Territory Alliance									
27 Aug 2016	2016 election		37.3%	31.3%	25.7%	5.6%	—	48.6%	—	51.4%

=== Johnston ===
Date	Firm	Sample size	Primary vote						2PP vote		
Date	Firm	Sample size	ALP	CLP	GRN	TA	OTH	UND	ALP	CLP	TA
22 Aug 2020	2020 election		45.3%	19.7%	17.2%	14.6%	3.2%	—	66.5%	33.5%	—
May–Jun 2020	MediaReach	200	35%	12%	—N/a	22%	14%	16%	—N/a	—N/a	—N/a
29 Feb 2020	2020 by-election		29.9%	16.3%	17.2%	22.1%	14.5%	—	52.6%	—	47.4%
31 Jan 2020	Ken Vowles resigns as member for Johnston										
27 Aug 2016	2016 election		51.4%	31.8%	17.2%	—	—	—	64.7%	35.3%	—

=== Mulka ===
Date	Firm	Sample size	Primary vote					2CP vote	
Date	Firm	Sample size	ALP	IND	CLP	OTH	UND	IND	ALP
22 Aug 2020	2020 election		—	—	—	—	—	55.0%	45.0%
May–Jun 2020	MediaReach	200	19%	31%	11%	9%	30%	—N/a	—N/a
27 Aug 2016	2016 election (Nhulunbuy)		44.4%	41.5%	13.1%	1.0%	—	50.1%	49.9%
