= Electoral results for the division of Spillett =

This is a list of electoral results for the Electoral division of Spillett in Northern Territory elections.

== Members for Spillett ==
Member	Party	Term
Lia Finocchiaro	Country Liberal	2016–present

== Election results ==
=== Elections in the 2010s ===
2016 Northern Territory general election: Spillett
Party	Candidate	Votes	%	±%
Country Liberal	Lia Finocchiaro	2,277	56.1	−5.6
Labor	Phil Tilbrook	1,247	30.7	+4.0
1 Territory	Jeff Norton	237	5.8	+5.8
Independent	Richard Smith	175	4.3	+4.3
Independent	Sonia McKay	95	2.3	+2.3
Citizens Electoral Council	Trudy Campbell	29	0.7	+0.7
Total formal votes		4,060	98.2	+1.4
Informal votes		76	1.8	−1.4
Turnout		4,136	78.3	+7.2
Two-party-preferred result
Country Liberal	Lia Finocchiaro	2,438	63.1	−4.9
Labor	Phil Tilbrook	1,428	36.9	+4.9
Country Liberal hold		Swing	−4.9	

=== Elections in the 2020s ===
2020 Northern Territory general election: Spillett
Party	Candidate	Votes	%	±%
Country Liberal	Lia Finocchiaro	2,921	59.0	−0.1
Labor	Tristan Sloan	1,594	32.2	+2.9
Territory Alliance	Vanessa Mounsey	434	8.8	+8.8
Total formal votes		4,949	97.5	N/A
Informal votes		126	2.5	N/A
Turnout		5,075	86.6	N/A
Two-party-preferred result
Country Liberal	Lia Finocchiaro	3,219	65.0	−0.3
Labor	Tristan Sloan	1,730	35.0	+0.3
Country Liberal hold		Swing	−0.3	

2024 Northern Territory general election: Spillett
Party	Candidate	Votes	%	±%
Country Liberal	Lia Finocchiaro	3,712	79.6	+23.5
Labor	Caleb Burke	952	20.4	−12.5
Total formal votes		4,664	97.5	+0.2
Informal votes		121	2.5	−0.2
Turnout		4,785	78.5	
Country Liberal hold		Swing	+16.1	
