= Members of the Northern Territory Legislative Assembly, 2016–2020 =

This is a list of members of the Northern Territory Legislative Assembly from 2016 to 2020, as elected at the 2016 election.

Name	Party	Electorate	Term in office
Ngaree Ah Kit	Labor	Karama	2016–present
Joel Bowden ^{[1]}	Labor	Johnston	2020–present
Jeff Collins	Labor/Independent/Territory Alliance ^{[1]}^{[2]}	Fong Lim	2016–2020
Lawrence Costa	Labor	Arafura	2016–present
Lia Finocchiaro	CLP	Spillett	2012–present
Hon Natasha Fyles	Labor	Nightcliff	2012–present
Hon Michael Gunner	Labor	Fannie Bay	2008–present
Yingiya Mark Guyula	Independent	Nhulunbuy	2016–present
Gary Higgins	CLP	Daly	2012–2020
Paul Kirby	Labor	Port Darwin	2016–present
Robyn Lambley	Independent/Territory Alliance	Araluen	2010–present
Hon Eva Lawler	Labor	Drysdale	2016–present
Hon Nicole Manison	Labor	Wanguri	2013–present
Hon Gerry McCarthy	Labor	Barkly	2008–2020
Scott McConnell	Labor/Independent ^{[1]}	Stuart	2016–2020
Terry Mills	Independent/Territory Alliance^{[2]}	Blain	1999–2014, 2016–2020
Hon Lauren Moss	Labor	Casuarina	2014–present
Sandra Nelson	Labor	Katherine	2016–2020
Chansey Paech	Labor	Namatjira	2016–present
Kezia Purick	Independent	Goyder	2008–present
Tony Sievers	Labor	Brennan	2016–2020
Selena Uibo	Labor	Arnhem	2016–present
Hon Ken Vowles	Labor ^{[1]}	Johnston	2012–2020
Hon Dale Wakefield	Labor	Braitling	2016–2020
Gerry Wood	Independent	Nelson	2001–2020
Kate Worden	Labor	Sanderson	2016–present

^{1} Three MPs—Jeff Collins (Fong Lim), Scott McConnell (Stuart) and Ken Vowles (Johnston)—were excluded from the Labor caucus for the remainder of the current term on 21 December 2018. Collins resigned from the Labor Party to sit as an independent on 8 February 2019, while McConnell followed in resigning from the parliamentary party on 19 February 2019. Vowles remained a member of the Labor Party outside caucus, until his resignation from the assembly on 31 January 2020. Joel Bowden was elected to replace him at a by-election on 29 February 2020.
^{2} Former chief minister and CLP leader Terry Mills founded the Territory Alliance party in late 2019. Former Labor MLA Jeff Collins and former CLP MLA Robyn Lambley joined the party in March 2020.

== See also ==
- Click here to read a list of members party affiliations as of 20 February 2019
- 2016 Northern Territory general election
