= Opposition (Northern Territory) =

The Opposition in the Northern Territory usually consists of the largest party not in Government. The Opposition's purpose is to hold the Government to account and constitute a "Government-in-waiting" should the existing Government fall. To that end, a Leader of the Opposition and Shadow Ministers for the various government departments question the Chief Minister and Ministers on Government policy and administration and formulate the policy the Opposition would pursue in Government.

At times, the Opposition consisted of both the Australian Labor Party (ALP) and Coalition counterpart, the Country Liberal Party (CLP).

The current Leader of the Opposition is Territory Labor Leader Selena Uibo.

== 14th Assembly Shadow Ministry (2020–2024) ==
=== Country Liberal Party ===
==== Finocchiaro Shadow Ministry (2020–2024) ====
Officeholder	Office(s)	Image
Lia Finocchiaro MLA	Leader of the Opposition – Shadow Chief Minister; Shadow Treasurer; Shadow Minister for Police, Fire and Emergency Services; Shadow Minister for Major Projects and Territory Economic Reconstruction (Until 10 May 2022); Shadow Minister for Strategic Defence Relations; Shadow Minister for Northern Australia and Trade; Shadow Minister for Major Projects (From 10 May 2022)	
Gerard Maley MLA	Deputy Leader of the Opposition; Shadow Minister for Infrastructure, Planning and Logistics; Shadow Minister for Multicultural Affairs; Shadow Minister for Defence Industries; Shadow Minister for Recreational Fishing; Shadow Minister for Alcohol Policy; Shadow Minister for National Resilience; Shadow Minister for Territory Development (From 10 May 2022)	
Steve Edgington MLA	Shadow Attorney-General and Minister for Justice; Shadow Minister for Mining and Industry; Shadow Minister for Aboriginal Affairs; Shadow Minister for Children; Shadow Minister for Treaty and Local Decision Making; Shadow Minister for Local Government (From 21 September 2021); Shadow Minister for Prevention of Domestic and Family Violence (From 10 May 2022)	
Joshua Burgoyne MLA	Opposition Whip; Shadow Minister for Territory Families and Urban Housing; Shadow Minister for Central Australia Economic Reconstruction; Shadow Minister for Renewables and Energy; Shadow Minister for Essential Services; Shadow Minister for Major Events; Shadow Minister for Youth; Shadow Minister for Climate Change; Shadow Minister for Agribusiness and Aquaculture (From 21 September 2021); Shadow Minister for Advanced Manufacturing (From 10 May 2022)	
Marie-Clare Boothby MLA	Shadow Minister for Tourism and Hospitality; Shadow Minister for Small Business; Shadow Minister for Jobs and Training; Shadow Minister for Racing, Gaming and Licensing; Shadow Minister for Women; Shadow Minister for Veterans’ Affairs (From 21 September 2021)	
Ian Sloan MLA (Until 21 September 2021)	Shadow Minister for Agribusiness and Aquaculture (Until 21 September 2021); Shadow Minister for Local Government (Until 21 September 2021); Shadow Minister for Arts and Culture (Until 21 September 2021); Shadow Minister for Veterans Affairs (Until 21 September 2021); Shadow Minister for Indigenous Essential Services (Until 21 September 2021)	
Jo Hersey MLA	Shadow Minister for Education; Shadow Minister for Environment; Shadow Minister for International Education; Shadow Minister for Sport; Shadow Minister for Water Security; Shadow Minister for Seniors; Shadow Minister for Arts, Culture and Heritage (From 21 September 2021)	
Bill Yan MLA	Shadow Minister for Health; Shadow Minister for Remote Housing and Town Camps; Shadow Minister for Public Employment; Shadow Minister for Corporate and Digital Development; Shadow Minister for Disabilities; Shadow Minister for Parks and Rangers; Shadow Minister for Indigenous Essential Services (From 21 September 2021); Shadow Minister for Desert Knowledge Australia (From 10 May 2021)	

== 13th Assembly Shadow Ministry (2016–2020) ==
The fallout of the 2016 Northern Territory general election resulted in the sitting CLP government reduced to two seats after a landslide result to the ALP who managed to win 18 seats. Independents won the second-largest share of seats with five members being elected. As a result, it was suggested that the independents would obtain opposition status because of their larger amount of seats in the assembly and as such attempts were made in 2019 and 2020. However, this was later rejected by the speaker Kezia Purick and the CLP went into the sitting of Parliament as the official opposition.

=== Country Liberal Party ===
==== Finocchiaro Shadow Ministry (2020) ====
Officeholder	Office(s)	Image
Lia Finocchiaro MLA	Leader of the Opposition; Shadow Chief Minister; Shadow Treasurer; Shadow Minister for Aboriginal Affairs; Shadow Minister for Treaty; Shadow Minister for Northern Australia; Shadow Attorney-General and Minister for Justice; Shadow Minister for Police, Fire and Emergency Services; Shadow Minister for Business and Innovation; Shadow Minister for Trade and Major Projects; Shadow Minister for Primary Industry and Resources; Shadow Minister for Environment and Natural Resources; Shadow Minister for Health; Shadow Minister for Disabilities; Shadow Minister for Territory Families; Shadow Minister for Education; Shadow Minister for Renewable, Energy and Essential Services; Shadow Minister for Children; Shadow Minister for Multicultural Affairs; Shadow Minister for Climate Change	
Gary Higgins MLA	Deputy Leader of the Opposition; Opposition Whip; Shadow Treasurer; Shadow Minister for Infrastructure, Planning and Logistics; Shadow Minister for Local Government, Housing and Community Development; Shadow Minister for Public Employment; Shadow Minister for Tourism, Sport and Culture; Shadow Minister for Corporate Information Services; Shadow Minister for Arafura Games; Shadow Minister for Workforce Training; Shadow Minister for Defence Jobs and Veteran's Affairs	

==== Higgins Shadow Ministry (2016–2020) ====
Officeholder	Office(s)	Image
Gary Higgins MLA	Leader of the Opposition; Shadow Minister for Aboriginal Affairs; Shadow Treasurer; Shadow Minister for Infrastructure, Planning and Logistics; Shadow Minister for Housing and Community Development; Shadow Minister for Tourism and Culture; Shadow Minister for Public Employment; Shadow Minister for Corporate and Information Services; Shadow Minister for Primary Industry and Resources; Shadow Minister for Northern Australia	
Lia Finocchiaro MLA	Deputy Leader of the Opposition; Opposition Whip; Shadow Minister for Police, Fire and Emergency Services; Shadow Attorney General and Minister for Justice; Shadow Minister for Health; Shadow Minister for Children; Shadow Minister for Territory Families; Shadow Minister for Education; Shadow Minister for Trade, Business and Innovation; Shadow Minister for Essential Services	

=== Territory Alliance ===
==== Mills Shadow Ministry (2020) ====
Officeholder	Office(s)
Terry Mills MLA	Leader of the Opposition; Shadow Minister for Northern Australia; Shadow Minister for Education and Workforce Training; Shadow Minister for Trade and Major Projects; Shadow Minister for Business and Innovation; Shadow Minister for Tourism, Sports and Culture; Shadow Minister for Defence Jobs and Veterans Affairs; Shadow Minister for Treaty; Shadow Minister for Aboriginal Affairs; Shadow Minister for Multicultural Affairs
Robyn Lambley MLA	Deputy Leader of the Opposition; Shadow Treasurer; Shadow Minister for Health; Shadow Minister for Public Employment; Shadow Minister for Territory Families; Shadow Minister for Children; Shadow Minister for Disabilities; Shadow Minister for Local Government, Housing and Community Development
Jeff Collins MLA	Leader of Opposition Business; Opposition Whip; Shadow Attorney-General and Shadow Minister for Justice; Shadow Minister for Police, Fire and Emergency Services; Shadow Minister for Primary Industry and Resources; Shadow Minister for Environment and Natural Resources; Shadow Minister for Renewables, Energy and Essential Services; Shadow Minister for Climate Change; Shadow Minister for Corporate and Information Services; Shadow Minister for Arafura Games

== See also ==
- 2020 Northern Territory opposition leadership dispute
