= Spillett =

Spillett is a surname. Notable people with the surname include:

- Brian Spillett (1937–1965), English George Cross recipient
- Hubert W. Spillett, British Baptist missionary
- Peter Spillett (1926–2004), British-born Australian historian and public servant
- Simon Spillett (born 1974), English jazz saxophonist
- Tasha Spillett-Sumner, Canadian author and educator

== See also ==
- Electoral division of Spillett, Northern Territory, Australia
