= Tollner =

Tollner or Töllner is a German language occupational surname for a collector of tolls or customs levies. Notable people with the name include:

- Dave Tollner (1966), Australian politician
- Ted Tollner (1940), former American football player and coach
