= 2020 Northern Territory general election =

- 22 August 2020

All 25 seats in the Northern Territory Legislative Assembly 13 seats needed for a majority
- Opinion polls
- Turnout: 74.9% (▲0.9 pp)
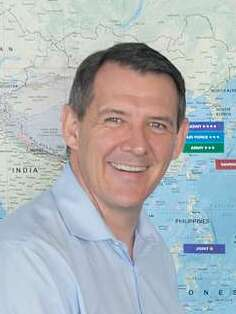

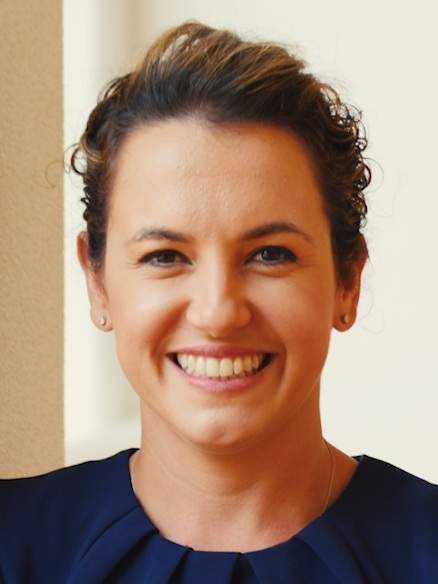

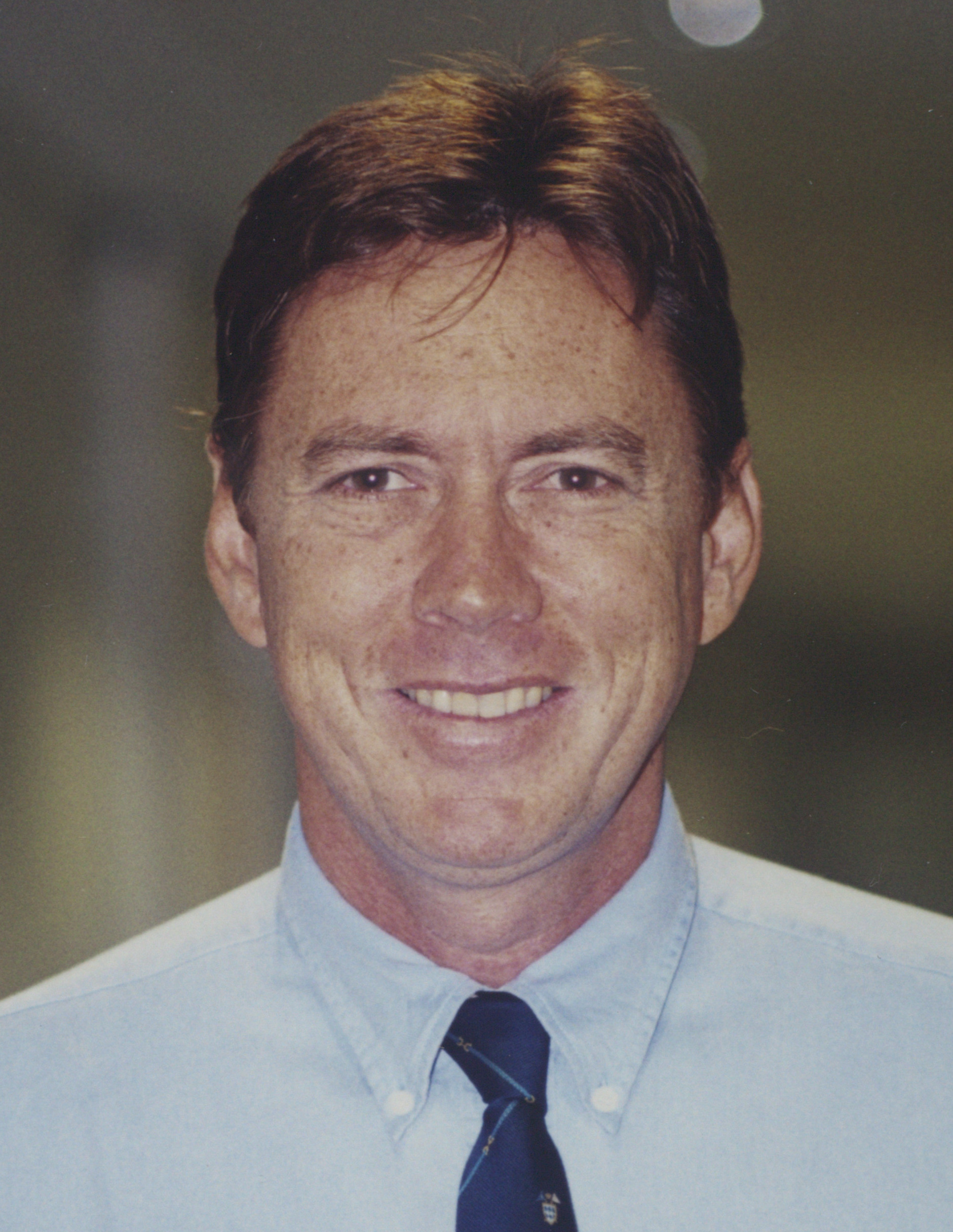
	First party	Second party	Third party
Leader	Michael Gunner	Lia Finocchiaro	Terry Mills
Party	Labor	Country Liberal	Territory Alliance
Leader since	20 April 2015	1 February 2020	31 August 2019
Leader's seat	Fannie Bay	Spillett	Blain (lost seat)
Last election	18 seats	2 seats	Did not exist
Seats before	17	2	3
Seats won	14	8	1
Seat change	▼4	▲6	▼2
Popular vote	40,291	32,021	13,184
Percentage	39.43%	31.34%	12.90%
Swing	▼2.76	▼0.46	▲12.90
TPP	53.3%	46.7%
TPP swing	▼3.9	▲3.9
Chief Minister before election
Michael Gunner
Labor
Elected Chief Minister
Michael Gunner
Labor

The 2020 Northern Territory general election was held on 22 August 2020 to elect all 25 members of the Legislative Assembly in the unicameral Northern Territory Parliament.

Members were elected through full preferential instant-runoff voting in single-member electorates, after the optional preferential voting system introduced for the 2016 election was abolished by the Electoral Legislation Amendment Act 2019 in April 2019. The election was conducted by the Northern Territory Electoral Commission, an independent body answerable to Parliament.

The incumbent centre-left Labor Party (ALP) majority government, led by Chief Minister Michael Gunner, won a second consecutive four-year term of government. It defeated the centre-right Country Liberal Party (CLP) opposition, led by Opposition Leader Lia Finocchiaro, and the regionalist big-tent Territory Alliance (TA) party, led by former Chief Minister Terry Mills.

ABC election analyst Antony Green called the election for the Labor Party nearly three hours after the polls closed. At the time it was not known if the party would claim a majority of seats, though on 24 August the ABC projected Labor had retained majority government. When the counting of votes concluded, Labor finished with 14 seats, enough for a two-seat majority on the floor of the Assembly. The Country Liberals won 8 seats, a gain of six from their landslide loss in the previous election, whilst 2 independents and 1 Territory Alliance candidate were elected. The new Gunner Ministry was sworn in on 8 September 2020.

== Background ==
=== Previous election ===
At the 2016 election, the one-term incumbent Country Liberal Party (CLP) minority government, led by Chief Minister Adam Giles, was defeated by the Labor Party Opposition, led by Opposition Leader Michael Gunner. The CLP suffered the worst defeat of a sitting government in the history of the Territory, and one of the worst defeats of a sitting government in the history of Australia. It was the first time that a sitting Northern Territory government was defeated after only one term. From 11 seats at dissolution (and 16 after the 2012 election), the CLP suffered the worst election performance in its history, winning only two seats. Labor won 18 seats, in the process winning the third-largest majority government in Territory history. Independents won five seats. With only two members in the CLP caucus, Gary Higgins became opposition leader and CLP leader while Lia Finocchiaro became deputy CLP leader on 2 September. Although the independent MPs outnumbered the CLP MPs, on official advice the CLP was recognised as the official opposition.

Additionally, Giles lost his seat of Braitling to Labor, making him only the second Chief Minister/Majority Leader and the third CLP leader to lose their seat at an election. Along with the seat of Katherine, the election represented the first time Labor had won a seat in Alice Springs or Katherine.

With the overall result beyond doubt, Gunner had himself, Natasha Fyles, and Nicole Manison sworn in as an interim three-person government on 31 August until the full Gunner Ministry could be sworn in on 12 September.

The position of Speaker of the Northern Territory Legislative Assembly had been held by former CLP-turned-independent MP Kezia Purick since 23 October 2012. Despite Labor's massive majority following the 2016 election, the incoming Labor government re-appointed Purick as Speaker.

=== Labor expulsions ===
The composition of the Assembly was unchanged for over two years, with Labor Party holding 18 seats, the Country Liberal Party two and the remaining five by independents. In December 2018, the Labor Government dismissed three sitting members of the parliamentary party; the Aboriginal Affairs Minister Ken Vowles, Assistant Minister Jeff Collins and backbencher Scott McConnell. The trio were dismissed after publicly criticising the government's handling of the territory's long-term economic situation, following a report finding the budget to be in "structural deficit" with expenditure struggling to cover previous borrowings and day-to-day costs. They consequently became independents and sat on the crossbench. McConnell later announced he would not re-contest his seat at the election, though did end up running for the adjacent seat of Braitling.

=== Territory Alliance founding ===
In August 2019, Terry Mills, the independent member for the seat of Blain, announced the formation of a new regionalist big tent party known as Territory Alliance. Mills had previously been the leader of the CLP and was Chief Minister of the Northern Territory following the Country Liberal Party's (CLP) victory at the 2012 election. He was usurped for the leadership of the party by Adam Giles only six months into his Chief Ministership, defeated 11–5 in a party-room ballot. With Mills' presence in the Assembly, the new Territory Alliance held one seat. This increased to three seats in March 2020 when Jeff Collins (expelled by Labor in December 2018) and Robyn Lambley (the former deputy CLP leader who was re-elected as an independent in 2016) announced they had joined the party, taking Territory Alliance's representation in the Assembly to three seats. With more members in the Assembly than the CLP, Alliance sought to claim official opposition status, though they were defeated 5–3 in a secret Assembly ballot of non-Government MPs and the CLP retained opposition status, with Lia Finocchiaro remaining as Opposition Leader.

=== Johnston by-election ===
With Scott McConnell having announced his retirement at the election and Jeff Collins becoming a member of the Territory Alliance, Ken Vowles, the remaining member of the Labor trio to be expelled by the party, announced his immediate resignation from the Assembly in November 2019. This decision necessitated a by-election in the seat of Johnston to replace Vowles. The by-election was held on 29 February 2020 and was won by Labor candidate Joel Bowden, who claimed 52.6% of the two-candidate preferred vote. Labor's primary vote collapsed more than 21 points, making the seat a marginal contest at the general election. The Territory Alliance candidate usurped the Greens and CLP candidates into second place (47.4% of the two-candidate preferred vote), with the CLP primary vote dropping by more than 15 points and the party finishing in fourth place.

== Election date ==
The parliament has fixed four-year terms, with elections to be held on the fourth Saturday of August every four years.

=== Key dates ===
Key dates in relation to the election were:

- 30 July 2020: Issue of the writ
- 30 July 2020: Nominations for candidates opened
- 31 July 2020: Electoral roll for voters closed (5:00 pm)
- 6 August 2020: Nominations for candidates closed
- 6 August 2020: Declaration of nominations and candidate positions on ballot papers
- 10 August 2020: Early voting and mobile voting commenced
- 10 August 2020: Applications for postal voting opened
- 20 August 2020: Postal voting dispatches ceased
- 21 August 2020: Last day for early voting
- 22 August 2020: Polling Day
- 4 September 2020: Last day for receipt of postal votes
- 7 September 2020: Declaration of election result
- TBD: Return of writ

== Redistribution ==
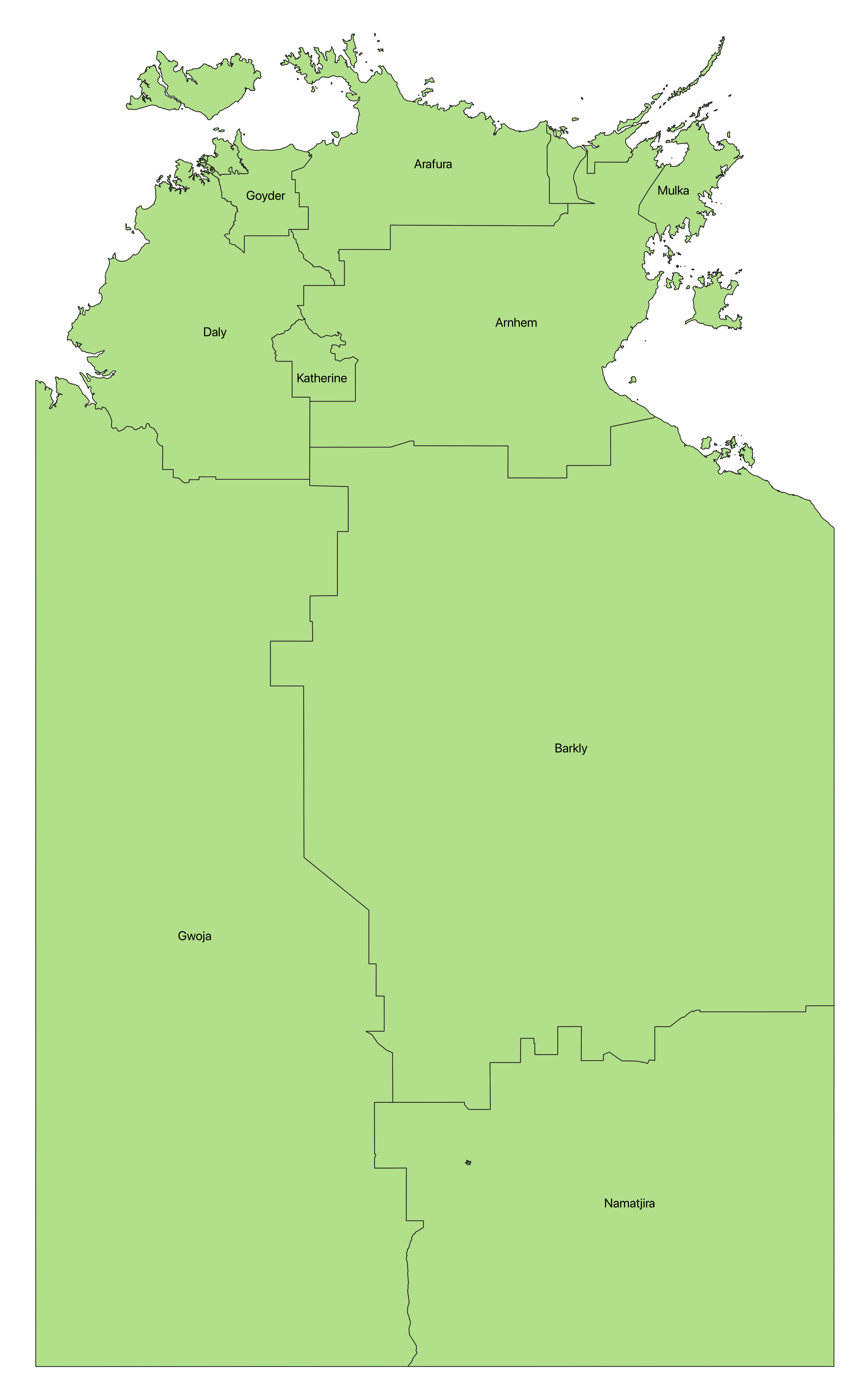
Map of electoral boundaries used at the 2020 election

A boundary redistribution for electoral divisions in the Northern Territory commenced on 27 February 2019, with the boundary commission releasing its report of the final boundaries on 4 September 2019.

- Two seats were renamed: Nhulunbuy became Mulka, and Stuart became Gwoja (after Gwoya Tjungurrayi).
- The boundaries of the electoral division of Katherine had historically been matched to those of the Katherine Town Council for a number of years, although the direct enrolment update program by the Australian Electoral Commission had increased enrolment numbers, bringing the division 11.5% over quota. RAAF Base Tindal and the suburb of Venn were consequently transferred to the division of Arnhem.
- The seat of Gwoja (formerly Stuart) was extended south to the South Australian border, taking what was the western half of Namatjira.
- Namatjira gained electors from the town of Alice Springs, including the suburbs of Larapinta and Stuart, and parts of Araluen, Braitling, Mount Johns and Sadadeen. To compensate for the influx of Alice Springs electors, the boundaries of Namatjira contracted from the north and transferred to Barkly, and contracted from the west and transferred into Gwoja.

== Pendulum ==
Government Labor (16) Official Opposition Country Liberal (2) Crossbench Territory Alliance (3) Independent (4)

Labor seats
Marginal
Katherine	Sandra Nelson	ALP	1.6
Brennan	Tony Sievers	ALP	2.6
Port Darwin	Paul Kirby	ALP	2.8
Braitling	Dale Wakefield	ALP	3.0
Drysdale	Eva Lawler	ALP	5.2
Fairly safe
Arafura	Lawrence Costa	ALP	7.3
Safe
Arnhem	Selena Uibo	ALP	10.5
Sanderson	Kate Worden	ALP	10.5
Casuarina	Lauren Moss	ALP	11.5
Karama	Ngaree Ah Kit	ALP	12.3
Fannie Bay	Michael Gunner	ALP	12.5
Johnston	Joel Bowden	ALP	15.7
Barkly	Gerry McCarthy	ALP	15.9
Wanguri	Nicole Manison	ALP	19.9
Gwoja	Scott McConnell	IND	22.2
Nightcliff	Natasha Fyles	ALP	26.7

Country Liberal seats
Marginal
Daly	Gary Higgins	CLP	1.7
Namatjira	Chansey Paech	ALP	2.0
Safe
Spillett	Lia Finocchiaro	CLP	15.3
Territory Alliance seats
Marginal
Blain	Terry Mills	TA	1.4 v ALP
Fong Lim	Jeff Collins	TA	5.6 (ALP v CLP)
Fairly safe
Araluen	Robyn Lambley	TA	8.6 v CLP
Independent seats
Mulka	Yingiya Mark Guyula	IND	0.1 v ALP
Nelson	Gerry Wood	IND	23.0 v CLP
Goyder	Kezia Purick	IND	25.3 v CLP

=== Notes ===
- This pre-election pendulum is based on post-redistribution estimates of margins calculated by ABC election analyst Antony Green.
- Members listed in italics are retiring at the 2020 election.

=== Post-election pendulum ===
Labor seats
Marginal
Blain	Mark Turner	ALP	0.2
Arnhem	Selena Uibo	ALP	1.6 v IND
Port Darwin	Paul Kirby	ALP	2.1
Fong Lim	Mark Monaghan	ALP	2.6
Arafura	Lawrence Costa	ALP	3.6
Fairly safe
Drysdale	Eva Lawler	ALP	7.9
Fannie Bay	Michael Gunner	ALP	9.6
Karama	Ngaree Ah Kit	ALP	9.8
Safe
Casuarina	Lauren Moss	ALP	15.9
Gwoja	Chansey Paech	ALP	16.2
Johnston	Joel Bowden	ALP	16.5
Wanguri	Nicole Manison	ALP	17.3
Sanderson	Kate Worden	ALP	19.3
Nightcliff	Natasha Fyles	ALP	24.3

Country Liberal seats
Marginal
Barkly	Steve Edgington	CLP	0.1
Namatjira	Bill Yan	CLP	0.3
Brennan	Marie-Clare Boothby	CLP	1.2
Daly	Ian Sloan	CLP	1.2
Braitling	Joshua Burgoyne	CLP	1.3
Katherine	Jo Hersey	CLP	2.3
Fairly safe
Nelson	Gerard Maley	CLP	8.3 v IND
Safe
Spillett	Lia Finocchiaro	CLP	15.0
Crossbench seats
Araluen	Robyn Lambley	TA	0.5 v CLP
Mulka	Yingiya Mark Guyula	IND	5.0 v ALP
Goyder	Kezia Purick	IND	6.8 v CLP

== Registered parties ==
At the time of the election, eight parties were registered with the Northern Territory Electoral Commission (NTEC).

- Animal Justice Party
- Australian Labor Party (Northern Territory Branch)
- Ban Fracking Fix Crime Protect Water (formerly 1 Territory Party)
- Country Liberal Party of the Northern Territory

- Federation Party Northern Territory (formerly Australian Country Party)
- NT Greens Inc.
- Shooters and Fishers Party
- Territory Alliance

== Retiring MLAs ==
=== Labor ===
- Gerry McCarthy (Barkly) – announced 12 May 2020
- Sandra Nelson (Katherine) – announced 20 March 2019

=== Country Liberal ===
- Gary Higgins (Daly) – announced 20 January 2020

=== Independent ===
- Gerry Wood (Nelson) – announced 15 February 2019

== Candidates ==
There were 111 candidates who nominated for the election—the second-highest number of candidates in a Territory election, just under the 115 who nominated in 2016.

Sitting members are listed in bold. Successful candidates are highlighted in the relevant colour. Where there is possible confusion, an asterisk is used.

Electorate	Held by	Labor	CLP	Territory Alliance	Greens	Other
Arafura	Labor	**Lawrence Costa**	Gibson Illortaminni	George Laughton		Tristan Mungatopi (Ind)
Araluen	Independent	Jackson Ankers	Damien Ryan	**Robyn Lambley**	Bernard Hickey	Domenico Pecorari (AFP); Wayne Wright (Ind)
Arnhem	Labor	**Selena Uibo**	Jerry Amato			Ian Mongunu Gumbula (Ind); Lance Lawrence (Ind)
Barkly	Labor	Sid Vashist	Steve Edgington			Gadrian Hoosan (Ind); Daniel Mulholland (Ind)
Blain	Independent	Mark Turner	Matthew Kerle	**Terry Mills**		
Braitling	Labor	**Dale Wakefield**	Joshua Burgoyne	Dale McIver	Chris Tomlins	Marli Banks (AFP); Kim Hopper (Ind); **Scott McConnell** (-)
Brennan	Labor	**Tony Sievers**	Marie-Clare Boothby	Abraham Mbemap		Peter Chandler (Ind)
Casuarina	Labor	**Lauren Moss**	Tony Schelling	Danial Kelly	Kendall Trudgen	
Daly	CLP	Anthony Venes	Ian Sloan	Regina McCarthy	Will Kemp	Mick Denigan (Ind)
Drysdale	Labor	**Eva Lawler**	Leanne Butler	Fiona Lynch		Danielle Eveleigh (Ind); Brendan Killalea (Ind); Lash Lisson (BFFCPW); Raj Samson (Ind. UAP)
Fannie Bay	Labor	**Michael Gunner**	Tracey Hayes	Rebecca Jennings	Peter Robertson	Mark Mackenzie (Ind)
Fong Lim	Labor	Mark Monaghan	Kylie Bonanni	**Jeff Collins**		Amye Un (Ind)
Goyder	Independent	Mick Taylor	Phil Battye	Rachael Wright	Karen Fletcher	Pauline Cass (Ind); Trevor Jenkins (-); **Kezia Purick*** (Ind); Ted Warren (Ind)
Gwoja	Labor	**Chansey Paech**	Phillip Alice			Kenny Lechleitner (AFP)
Johnston	Labor	**Joel Bowden**	Gary Haslett	Steven Klose	Aiya Goodrich Carttling	Josh Thomas (Ind)
Karama	Labor	**Ngaree Ah Kit**	Brian O'Gallagher	Caleb Cardno		
Katherine	Labor	Kate Ganley	Jo Hersey	Melanie Usher		Clinton Booth (Ind)
Mulka	Independent	Lynne Walker				**Yingiya Mark Guyula** (Ind)
Namatjira	CLP	Sheralee Taylor	Bill Yan	Matt Paterson	Nikki McCoy	Catherine Satour (AFP); Tony Willis (Ind)
Nelson	Independent	Steve Asher	Gerard Maley	Andy Harley		Beverley Ratahi (Ind)
Nightcliff	Labor	**Natasha Fyles**	Steve Doherty	Melita McKinnon	Billee McGinley	Shelley Landmark (AJP)
Port Darwin	Labor	**Paul Kirby**	Toby George	Gary Strachan	Timothy Parish	Leah Potter (Ind)
Sanderson	Labor	**Kate Worden**	Derek Mayger	Amelia Nuku		
Spillett	CLP	Tristan Sloan	**Lia Finocchiaro**	Vanessa Mounsey		
Wanguri	Labor	**Nicole Manison**	Jed Hansen	Michael Best		

== Results ==
Map of results by electorate.

↓
14	2	1	8
ALP	Ind	TA	CLP

=== Results summary ===
Legislative Assembly (IRV) – (CV)
Party	Votes	%	+/-	Seats	+/-
Labor	40,291	39.43	▼2.76	14	▼4
Country Liberal	32,021	31.34	▼0.46	8	▲6
Territory Alliance	13,184	12.90	New	1	▲1
Independents	10,977	10.74	▼8.09	2	▼3
Greens	4,453	4.46	▲1.49	0	Steady
Australian Federation	942	0.92	New	0	Steady
Ban Fracking Fix Crime Protect Water	226	0.22	▼3.36 (Note: Figure based on 2016 total for the 1 Territory Party, from which Ban Fracking Fix Crime Protect Water was renamed.)	0	Steady
Animal Justice	78	0.08	New	0	Steady
Formal votes	102,172	96.54	−1.46		
Informal votes	3,661	3.46	+1.46		
Total	105,833	100		25	
Registered voters / turnout	141,255	74.94	+0.92		
Two-party-preferred vote (Note: Estimate by Antony Green based on the 24 seats with a two-party count between Labor and CLP. Mulka is excluded as the CLP did not run in that seat.)
Labor		53.3	▼3.9		
Country Liberal		46.7	▲3.9		

Popular vote
Labor	39.4%
Country Liberal	31.3%
Territory Alliance	12.9%
Greens	4.4%
Independents	10.7%
Others	1.2%

Two-party preferred vote
Labor	53.3%
Country Liberal	46.7%

Seats
Labor	56.0%
Country Liberal	32.0%
Territory Alliance	4.0%
Independents	8.0%

The CLP regained a number of seats in traditional heartlands that it had lost to Labor in 2016, with the party winning back Braitling, Brennan and Katherine from the ALP. It also won the outback seats of Barkly and Namatjira by narrow margins. The ALP maintained its dominance of the Darwin/Palmerston area, holding all but two of the region's seats–accounting for almost all of its majority. The ALP managed to consolidate some of its gains from 2016. It retained Port Darwin and Drysdale, two seats it had only won once before 2016, while gaining Blain, a seat it had never won before. The ALP also won a majority of the two-party vote for only the third time ever in a Territory election.

Both incumbent independent MLAs running for reelection, Yingiya Mark Guyula and Kezia Purick, retained their seats, but long-serving independent Gerry Wood was succeeded by a CLP candidate in Nelson. The Territory Alliance won a single seat, with Robyn Lambley narrowly holding her seat of Araluen; party leader Terry Mills and Jeff Collins both lost their seats.

=== Seats changing hands ===
Members in italics did not re-contest their seats at this election. Margins are notional estimates by Antony Green.

Seat	Pre-election			Swing	Post-election		
Seat	Party	Member	Margin	Swing	Margin	Member	Party
Barkly	Labor	Gerry McCarthy	15.9	16.0	0.1	Steve Edgington	Country Liberal
Blain	Territory Alliance	Terry Mills	1.4 (IND)	N/A	0.2	Mark Turner	Labor
Braitling	Labor	Dale Wakefield	3.0	4.3	1.3	Joshua Burgoyne	Country Liberal
Brennan	Labor	Tony Sievers	2.6	3.8	1.2	Marie-Clare Boothby	Country Liberal
Fong Lim	Territory Alliance	Jeff Collins	5.6 (ALP)	−3.0	2.6	Mark Monaghan	Labor
Katherine	Labor	Sandra Nelson	1.6	3.9	2.3	Jo Hersey	Country Liberal
Namatjira	Labor	Chansey Paech	−2.0*	−1.7	0.3	Bill Yan	Country Liberal
Nelson	Independent	Gerry Wood	23.0	31.2	8.3	Gerard Maley	Country Liberal

- *Due to boundary changes, Namatjira was notionally CLP at the time of this election.
