= Solicitor-General of the Northern Territory =

Solicitor-General of Department of the Attorney General and Justice
- Coat of arms of the Northern Territory
- Incumbent; Nikolai Christrup SC
- Appointer: Administrator of the Northern Territory

The Solicitor-General of the Northern Territory of Australia is the second law officer of the Northern Territory. It should not be confused with the Solicitor of the Northern Territory, who acts as the solicitor for the entire government of the territory.
