= Mark Monaghan =

Australian politician

Mark Monaghan MLA

14th Speaker of the Northern Territory Legislative Assembly
- In office 23 May 2022 – 13 February 2024
- Deputy: Joel Bowden (until 23 June 2022); Dheran Young (from 23 June 2022)
- Preceded by: Ngaree Ah Kit
- Succeeded by: Dheran Young

Member of the Northern Territory Legislative Assembly for Fong Lim
- In office 22 August 2020 – 24 August 2024
- Preceded by: Jeff Collins
- Succeeded by: Tanzil Rahman

Personal details
- Born: Mark Monaghan
- Party: Labor
- Spouse: Michelle
- Children: Three
- Education: University of Tasmania
- Occupation: Teacher

Mark Monaghan is an Australian politician who served as MP for the Australian Labor Party in the Northern Territory Legislative Assembly for the electoral division of Fong Lim until his defeat in 2024. He was the 14th Speaker of the Northern Territory Legislative Assembly after being elected on 23 May 2022 following the appointment of the previous Speaker Ngaree Ah Kit to cabinet. He was succeeded as Speaker by Dheran Young.

== Pre-politics ==
Monaghan worked as a teacher prior to entering politics and has lived in the Northern Territory for over 20 years. He met his wife Michelle while working there and together they have three children. After teaching, Monaghan was attached to various roles, including being the General Manager of Engineers Australia.

== Politics ==
Northern Territory Legislative Assembly
Years	Term	Electoral division	Party
2020–2024	14th	Fong Lim	Labor

Monaghan was selected for Labor to contest the marginal seat of Fong Lim in the 2020 Northern Territory general election to replace Jeff Collins who resigned from the party in 2019 and contested the seat with the Territory Alliance party. Monaghan won this seat against incumbent, Jeff Collins, despite it being a marginal victory, it was one of the competitive races which decided the 2020 election.

Monaghan was selected by his caucus as speaker in 2023 after a struggle to fill the speakership following the resignation of Kezia Purick. He lost his seat to the CLP's Tanzil Rahman at the 2024 election.

Northern Territory Legislative Assembly
Preceded by Jeff Collins	Member for Fong Lim; 2020–2024	Succeeded by Tanzil Rahman
Preceded by Ngaree Ah Kit	Speaker of the Northern Territory Legislative Assembly; 2022–2024	Succeeded by Dheran Young
