= Tanzil Rahman =

Australian politician

Tanzil Rahman MLA
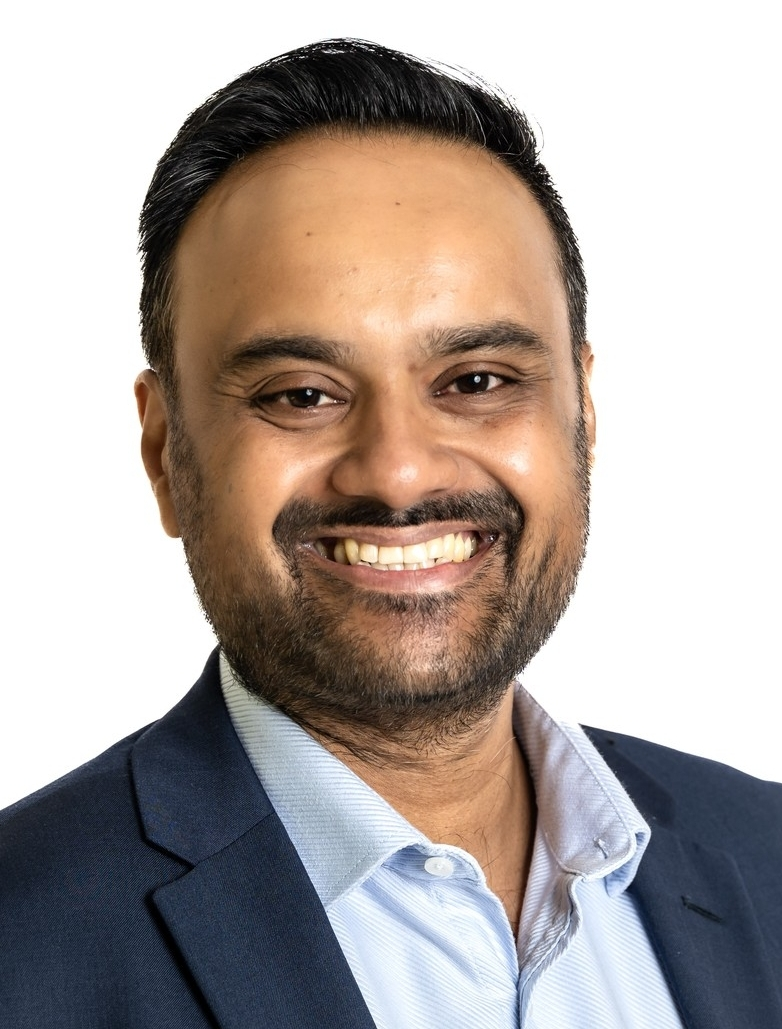

Member of the Northern Territory Legislative Assembly for Fong Lim
- Incumbent
- Assumed office 24 August 2024
- Preceded by: Mark Monaghan

Personal details
- Born: (age 47–48) Canberra, ACT, Australia
- Party: Country Liberal (since 2024); Labor (2023–2024)
- Education: USyd (BEc, LLB); Oxford (PhD)
- Occupation: Advisor; Academic; Politician
- Website: www.tanzilrahman.com

Tanzil Rahman (Bengali: তানজিল রহমান, romanized: Tānajila rahamāna) is an Australian politician who since the 2024 Northern Territory general election has been the MLA for Fong Lim in Darwin's east. He succeeded former education minister Mark Monaghan, winning around 57.8% of the two-party-preferred vote. Before entering the Northern Territory Parliament, Rahman worked for the Department of the Chief Minister and Cabinet.

Rahman's election has contributed to what has been referred as a Country Liberal landslide in the 2024 election.

== Early life and career ==
Rahman was born in Canberra, Australian Capital Territory, Australia and was raised, from the age of two-years-old, in Karama, in the northeast of Darwin, Northern Territory. Rahman's grandparents emigrated to Australia from East Pakistan (now known as Bangladesh) as a result of the Bangladesh Liberation War.

He attended Sanderson Primary and High School. Rahman graduated from the University of Sydney with a Bachelor of Economics and Laws before gaining a Doctor of Philosophy (PhD) from Oxford, having studied in the School of Geography.

=== Politics ===
From August 2023 to January 2024, Rahman was a member of the Northern Territory Labor Party and had sought pre-selection as the party's candidate for the seat of Wanguri, which was held by the party's former Deputy Chief Minister, Nicole Manison, who did not contest her seat. Having not received a response regarding his candidacy inquiry, Rahman resigned his membership from the party. In March 2024, just months after his resignation from Labor, Rahman was announced as the Country Liberal Party's candidate for Fong Lim (167 days before the election).

Northern Territory Legislative Assembly
Preceded by Mark Monaghan	Member for Fong Lim; 2024–present	Incumbent
