= Peter Spillett =

Peter Gerald Spillett AM (20 January 1926 – 18 December 2004) was a British-born Australian historian and public servant.

Spillett was born in Surbiton, Surrey (now part of London). He was educated at London Polytechnic and University of London, before serving as a radio operator in the Royal Air Force. In 1950, he emigrated to Australia, working in Western Australia and Victoria before joining the Australian Public Service and moving to Darwin. He was made a Member of the Order of Australia (AM) for services to the community in 1978. While working for the Northern Territory government, he suffered a serious heart attack and retired in 1982.

He remained active in historical research and the Anglican Church, founding the Historical Society of the Northern Territory and serving as President and Honorary Life Member of the society and the National Trust of Australia (Northern Territory). He had a particular interest in Makassan contact with Australia, and spent thousands of hours researching the trade and fishing arrangements between the Indonesian trepangers and the Yolngu people of Arnhem Land in the eighteenth century.

Spillett died suddenly in Bali, Indonesia in December 2004. The Pensioners Association named its headquarters Spillett House after him, and before his death in 2004, the Museum and Art Gallery of the Northern Territory named its library after him. In 2016, a newly created Territory electoral division was named Spillett in his honour.
