= Hubert W. Spillett =

Hubert William Spillett was a British Christian missionary and Bible translator.

Spillett gained a First Class Honours degree in Chinese Language and Literature at London University, before going to China as a missionary with the Baptist Missionary Society. During the war period he was transferred to educational work in Ceylon. In 1947, he returned to China and served there until 1952. In the following year he was seconded to Hong Kong to work with the Chinese Christian Literature Council. He served as General Secretary of that body until retirement in 1967. In 1968-70 he worked in the archives of the British and Foreign Bible Society (BFBS) and later in 1970 began the revision of this catalogue, completing it at the end of 1973. The catalogue was edited by the Librarian of the BFBS, and typed by staff of the Translations Department.

== Selected works ==
- A catalogue of Scriptures in the languages of China and the Republic of China, British and Foreign Bible Society (1975)
