= Dave Tollner =

Australian politician

The Honourable Dave Tollner
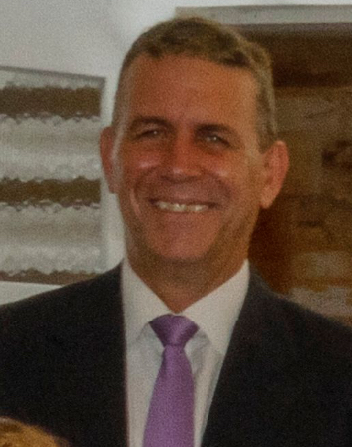
- Tollner in 2015

Deputy Chief Minister of the Northern Territory
- In office 13 March 2013 – 22 August 2014
- Preceded by: Willem Westra van Holthe
- Succeeded by: Peter Chandler

Member of the Northern Territory Legislative Assembly for Fong Lim
- In office 9 August 2008 – 8 August 2016
- Preceded by: New division
- Succeeded by: Jeff Collins

Member of the Australian Parliament for Solomon
- In office 10 November 2001 – 24 November 2007
- Preceded by: New seat
- Succeeded by: Damian Hale

Personal details
- Born: 31 January 1966 (age 60) Biloela, Queensland
- Party: Country Liberal Party / Liberal
- Occupation: Manager
- Website: davidtollner.com

David William Tollner (born 31 January 1966) is an Australian politician. He was the Country Liberal Party member for Solomon in the Australian House of Representatives from 2001 to 2007, and then served in the Northern Territory Legislative Assembly as the member for Fong Lim from 2008 to 2016. He was the Deputy Chief Minister of the Northern Territory under chief minister Adam Giles from 2013 to 2014. During his time in federal parliament, he sat with the Liberal Party.

== Early life and federal politics ==
Tollner was born in Biloela, Queensland, and worked as a manager and company director before entering politics. He contested the 1997 territory election as an independent, narrowly losing to CLP candidate Chris Lugg in the seat of Nelson. He subsequently won the new federal seat of Solomon for the CLP at the 2001 federal election, and was re-elected at the 2004 election. He was narrowly defeated by Labor candidate Damian Hale at the 2007 election.

Tollner sat with the Liberal Party in federal parliament during his time as member for Solomon.

== Territory politics ==
Northern Territory Legislative Assembly
Years	Term	Electoral division	Party
2008–2012	11th	Fong Lim	Country Liberal
2012–2016	12th	Fong Lim	Country Liberal

Tollner then contested the 2008 territory election, winning the new seat of Fong Lim and defeating Labor minister Matthew Bonson. He was re-elected at the 2012 election, and upon the CLP's victory was appointed Minister for Health, Minister for Alcohol Rehabilitation and Policy, and Minister for Housing. In March 2013, Mills expelled Tollner from his cabinet after a heated disagreement between the two at a party meeting. According to former MLA Daryl Manzie, Tollner swore at Mills and threw a stack of cabinet papers at him before walking out of the room.

Tollner was appointed deputy chief minister of the Northern Territory on 13 March 2013. He caused controversy in August 2014 when he referred to the gay son of fellow CLP MP Gary Higgins as a "pillow biter" and "shirt lifter". As a result, it was announced that Tollner's resignation as deputy leader of the CLP had been accepted. Despite that, Tollner said a few days later that he wanted to be restored to his former position or he would quit the party, leaving it in a precarious position on the floor of the Legislative Assembly. On 1 September, Chief Minister Adam Giles threw open the leadership and deputy leadership to a party room ballot. Giles was re-elected as CLP leader, and Peter Chandler was voted in as his deputy. He has also been accused of making racist comments; in 2014 he was accused of calling two women "lubras", which is a racial slur targeted at Indigenous women.

A redistribution ahead of the 2016 election all but erased Tollner's majority in Fong Lim, slashing it from a fairly safe 7.3 percent to an extremely marginal 0.2 percent. Tollner tried to transfer to the newly created seat of Spillett, which had absorbed much of the eastern portion of Fong Lim. However, he lost a November 2015 preselection battle to Lia Finocchiaro, the member for neighbouring Drysdale. His senior advisor, Tim Dixon, was pre-selected for Fong Lim, but lost the seat to Labor.

== Notes ==
Parliament of Australia
New division	Member for Solomon; 2001–2007	Succeeded by Damian Hale
Northern Territory Legislative Assembly
New division	Member for Fong Lim; 2008–2016	Succeeded by Jeff Collins
Political offices
Preceded by Willem Westra van Holthe	Deputy Chief Minister of the Northern Territory; 2013–2014	Succeeded by Peter Chandler
