= Electoral division of Fong Lim =

Coordinates: 12°15′36″S 130°30′36″E

Fong Lim Northern Territory—Legislative Assembly
- Interactive map of boundaries as of the 2024 election
- Territory: Northern Territory
- Created: 2008
- MP: Tanzil Rahman
- Party: Country Liberal
- Namesake: Alec Fong Lim
- Electors: 5,817 (2026)
- Area: 31 km^{2} (12.0 sq mi)
- Demographic: Urban
Electorates around Fong Lim:
Fannie Bay	Sanderson	Karama
Fannie Bay	Fong Lim	Nelson
Port Darwin; Darwin Harbour	Darwin Harbour	Darwin Harbour

Fong Lim is an electoral division of the Legislative Assembly in Australia's Northern Territory.

The district is named after Alec Fong Lim, Lord Mayor of Darwin from 1984 to 1990. There were 5,817 people enrolled in the division in July 2026.

The seat is currently held by Tanzil Rahman of the Country Liberal Party.

== Geography ==
Fong Lim is located in the suburban corridor south of the Stuart Highway in Darwin. It takes in the suburbs of Bayview, Stuart Park, Woolner and The Narrows, and parts of Coconut Grove and Ludmilla.

== History ==
Fong Lim largely replaced the abolished seat of Millner, and was renamed in honour of former Darwin Lord Mayor Alec Fong Lim. It was first contested at the 2008 election. Based on the results of the previous election, it was calculated to have a Labor majority of 61.5% to 38.5% versus the Liberal Party. It was contested by the incumbent member for Millner, Labor MP Matthew Bonson, who lost to the Country Liberal Party's candidate, former federal MP Dave Tollner, on a swing of 13 percent. Tollner was reelected in 2012 as the CLP won government.

However, a redistribution ahead of the 2016 election dramatically altered Fong Lim. Virtually all of the eastern portion of the seat was transferred to the new seat of Spillett, making Fong Lim a more compact Darwin-based seat. This all but erased the CLP majority in the seat, reducing it to an extremely marginal 0.2 percent. Tollner tried to win CLP preselection for Spillett, but lost to Lia Finocchiaro. Meanwhile, Jeff Collins won the seat for Labor on a swing of over eight percent. Collins was expelled from his party in 2018. Two years later, he joined the Territory Alliance, but came in third in the 2020 general election as Labor's Mark Monaghan won back the seat. In 2024 CLP candidate Tanzil Rahman won the seat.

== Members for Fong Lim ==
Member	Party	Term
Dave Tollner	Country Liberal	2008–2016
Jeff Collins	Labor	2016–2018
Jeff Collins	Independent Labor	2018–2020
Jeff Collins	Territory Alliance	2020
Mark Monaghan	Labor	2020–2024
Tanzil Rahman	Country Liberal	2024–present

== Election results ==
2024 Northern Territory general election: Fong Lim
Party	Candidate	Votes	%	±%
Country Liberal	Tanzil Rahman	2,050	48.5	+12.1
Labor	Mark Monaghan	1,174	27.8	−14.0
Greens	Simon Niblock	672	15.9	+15.9
Independent	Amye Un	329	7.8	−2.2
Total formal votes		4,225	97.7	+0.2
Informal votes		118	2.7	−0.2
Turnout		4,343	76.5	
Two-party-preferred result
Country Liberal	Tanzil Rahman	2,428	57.5	+9.6
Labor	Mark Monaghan	1,791	42.5	−9.6
Country Liberal gain from Labor		Swing	+9.6	
