= Ban Fracking Fix Crime Protect Water =

- Leader: Braedon Earley
- Founded: 2015
- Ideology: Green liberalism
- Political position: Centre
- Territory: Northern Territory

Logo of the party under its old name

Ban Fracking Fix Crime Protect Water, formerly the 1 Territory Party, is a registered political party in Australia's Northern Territory. It was registered with the Northern Territory Electoral Commission on 18 November 2015.

The party's founder is Braedon Earley, a former president of the Country Liberal Party (CLP), and more recently a member of the Palmer United Party. Another former CLP president, Sue Fraser-Adams, is also a member. Earley announced his intention to establish a new party in June 2015, although its name was not announced until later. It described its ideology as "straight down the middle." The party required its members to undergo psychological and drug testing before being allowed to run, and adhere to a strict code of conduct. Earley said that anyone who turned into "a hubris idiot" would be expelled in short order.

The party's first announced policy was to implement a ban on hydraulic fracturing (fracking).

At the 2016 Northern Territory election, 1 Territory ran candidates in thirteen out of the 25 Legislative Assembly seats, with only the CLP and the Labor Party running more candidates. Prior to the election, it was suggested that 1 Territory would primarily attract disaffected CLP voters. The party won 3.6% of the vote, and no seats in the assembly.
