= Electoral division of Araluen =

Coordinates: 23°42′8″S 133°50′59″E

Araluen Northern Territory—Legislative Assembly
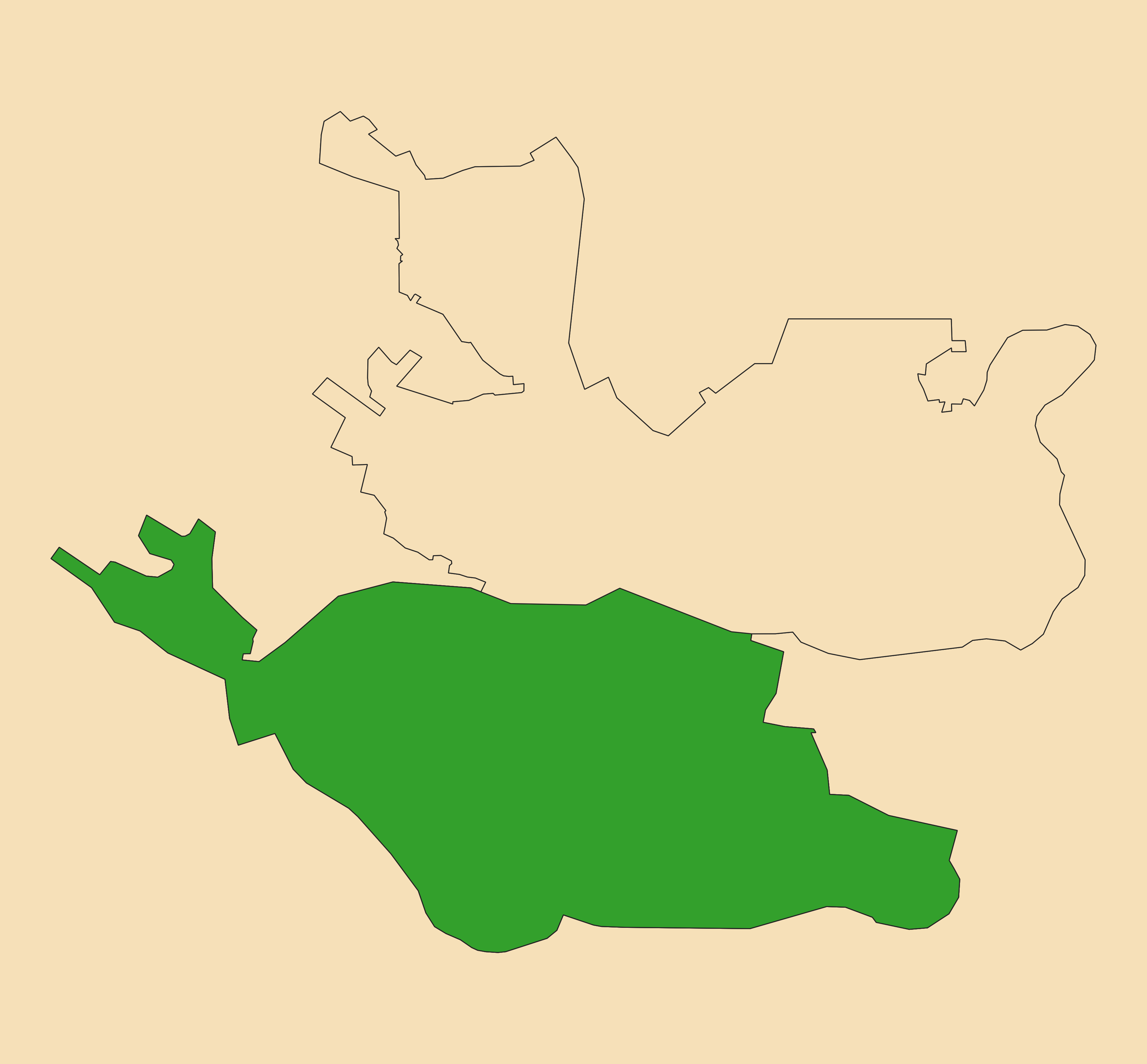
- Interactive map of boundaries
- Territory: Northern Territory
- Created: 1983
- MP: Robyn Lambley
- Party: Independent
- Namesake: Araluen
- Electors: 5,959 (2026)
- Area: 8 km^{2} (3.1 sq mi)
- Demographic: Urban
Electorates around Araluen:
Namatjira	Braitling	Namatjira
Namatjira	Araluen	Namatjira
Namatjira	Namatjira	Namatjira

Araluen is an electoral division of the Legislative Assembly in Australia's Northern Territory. It was first created in 1983, replacing the electorate of Alice Springs, which had been abolished as part of the enlargement of the Assembly. The electorate covers a 8 km^{2} (3.1 sq mi) area to the south and west of Alice Springs, including the Alice Springs CBD, the suburb of Araluen, and some surrounding rural areas. There were 5,959 people enrolled in the electorate as of July 2026.

The current member for Araluen is Robyn Lambley, who has held the seat since 2010. She was originally elected as a member of the Country Liberal Party (CLP), but resigned from the party in 2015 and was re-elected as an independent at the 2016 election. In 2020 she joined the Territory Alliance, but left the party the same year.

== History ==
The city of Alice Springs has traditionally been a strong support base for the conservative Country Liberal Party, and for most of its first 33 years Araluen was one of the CLP's safest seats. In the first three decades of Araluen's existence, the CLP's hold on the seat was only seriously threatened once. In 2001, the retirement of veteran Cabinet minister Eric Poole and two prominent independent candidacies nearly delivered the seat to Labor. New CLP candidate Jodeen Carney only held the seat by 134 votes, making Araluen the CLP's most marginal seat.

Carney proved to be a popular local member, and was one of only four CLP members to be returned amidst the Labor landslide at the 2005 election. She proved to be in the least danger of the CLP's elected members; indeed, she was the only one to actually pick up a swing in her favour. She subsequently served as the territory's Opposition Leader after the election from 2005 until January 2008. Carney was re-elected with nearly 70 per cent of the primary vote at the 2008 election, reverting Araluen to its traditional status as a comfortably safe CLP seat. Carney resigned on 3 September 2010; a by-election to replace her was held on 9 October 2010 which saw Robyn Lambley retain the seat for the CLP. Lambley resigned from the CLP on 18 June 2015 to sit as an independent. She easily retained the seat at the 2016 election. In 2020 she joined the newly created centrist Territory Alliance. Lambley was narrowly reelected at the 2020 election as the only TA member to win their seat.

In 2011, as part of a redistribution, it was proposed to rename the seat to Perkins, in honour of Hetty Perkins, an Arrernte elder. However, the proposal was later abandoned after local opposition.

== Members for Araluen ==
Member	Party	Term
Jim Robertson	Country Liberal	1983–1986
Eric Poole	Country Liberal	1986–2001
Jodeen Carney	Country Liberal	2001–2010
Robyn Lambley	Country Liberal	2010–2015
Robyn Lambley	Independent	2015–2020
Robyn Lambley	Territory Alliance	2020
Robyn Lambley	Independent	2020–present

== Election results ==
2024 Northern Territory general election: Araluen
Party	Candidate	Votes	%	±%
Independent	Robyn Lambley	1,638	40.7	+11.5
Country Liberal	Sean Heenan	1,062	26.4	−11.6
Greens	Hugo Wells	666	16.6	+6.1
Labor	Gagandeep Sodhi	536	13.3	−4.7
Independent	Wayne Wright	119	3.0	+1.4
Total formal votes		4,021	96.5	−0.0
Informal votes		144	3.5	+0.0
Turnout		4,165	70.7	−8.0
Two-party-preferred result (Note: Estimated two-party-preferred count by Antony Green.)
Country Liberal	Sean Heenan	2,481	61.7	−0.9
Labor	Gagandeep Sodhi	1,540	38.3	+0.9
Two-candidate-preferred result
Independent	Robyn Lambley	2,603	64.7	+14.3
Country Liberal	Sean Heenan	1,418	35.3	−14.3
Independent hold		Swing	+14.3	
