= Northern Territory Electoral Commission =

Agency overview
- Formed: 15 March 2004
- Superseding agency: Northern Territory Electoral Office
- Jurisdiction: Northern Territory Government
- Agency executive: Iain Loganathan, Electoral Commissioner
- Website: ntec.nt.gov.au

The Northern Territory Electoral Commission (NTEC) is an independent government agency of the Government of the Northern Territory with responsibility for the conduct of elections for the unicameral NT Legislative Assembly, referendums and local government (Council) elections. It also determines electoral boundaries for the NT and provides electoral advice and services to government and on-government agencies. It is also responsible for electoral research, registration of political parties and tracking of their finances, and promoting public awareness of elections. The NTEC was established on 15 March 2004, by the Electoral Act 2004.

== Structure and Staffing ==
The NT Electoral Commission consists of a small number of full-time staff, including the Electoral Commissioner, Iain Loganathan. The commission hires casual workers around election times, when work levels grow.

== See also ==
- Northern Territory Legislative Assembly
- Electoral divisions of the Northern Territory
- Electoral systems of the Australian states and territories
- Parliaments of the Australian states and territories
