= 2016 Northern Territory general election =

- 27 August 2016

All 25 seats of the Northern Territory Legislative Assembly 13 seats needed for a majority
- Opinion polls
- Turnout: 74.0 (▼2.9 pp)
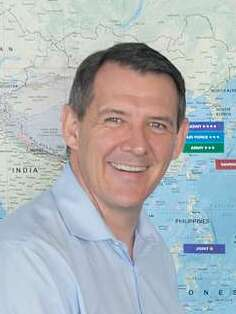

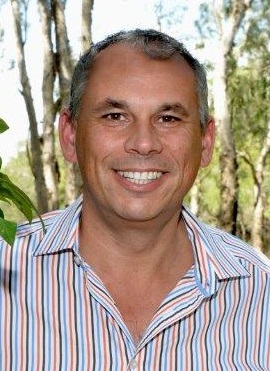
| | First party | Second party |
|---|---|---|
| Leader | Michael Gunner | Adam Giles |
| Party | Labor | Country Liberal |
| Leader since | 20 April 2015 | 14 March 2013 |
| Leader's seat | Fannie Bay | Braitling (lost seat) |
| Last election | 8 seats | 16 seats |
| Seats before | 7 | 12 |
| Seats won | 18 | 2 |
| Seat change | ▲11 | ▼10 |
| Popular vote | 41,476 | 31,263 |
| Percentage | 42.2% | 31.8% |
| Swing | ▲5.7 | ▼18.8 |
| TPP | 57.5% | 42.5% |
| TPP swing | ▲13.3 | ▼13.3 |
Chief Minister before election
Adam Giles
Country Liberal
Elected Chief Minister
Michael Gunner
Labor

The 2016 Northern Territory general election was held on Saturday 27 August 2016 to elect all 25 members of the Legislative Assembly in the unicameral Northern Territory Parliament.

Legislation was passed in February 2016 to change the voting method of single-member electorates from full-preferential voting to optional preferential voting. Electoral districts were redistributed in 2015. The election was conducted by the Northern Territory Electoral Commission, an independent body answerable to Parliament.

The one-term incumbent Country Liberal Party (CLP) minority government, led by Chief Minister Adam Giles, was defeated by the Opposition Labor Party, led by Opposition Leader Michael Gunner, in a landslide. The CLP suffered the worst defeat of a sitting government in the history of the Territory, and one of the worst defeats of a sitting government in Australian history. It was the first time that a sitting Northern Territory government was defeated after only one term. From 11 seats at dissolution (and 16 at the 2012 election), the CLP suffered the worst election performance in its history, winning only two seats—those of second-term MPs Gary Higgins (the only survivor of the Giles cabinet) and Lia Finocchiaro. Labor won 18 seats, in the process winning the third-largest majority government in Territory history, and the second-largest since the Territory was granted self-government in 1978. Independents won five seats. Although the independent MPs outnumbered the CLP MPs, on official advice the CLP was recognised as the official opposition.

Additionally, Giles lost his Alice Springs-based seat of Braitling to Labor, making him only the second sitting Chief Minister/Majority Leader to lose his own seat at an election. Labor also took Katherine, previously the safest seat in the Territory, off the CLP. It was the first and only election that saw Labor win seats in Katherine and inner Alice Springs.

With the overall result beyond doubt, Gunner had himself, Natasha Fyles, and Nicole Manison sworn in as an interim three-person government on 31 August until the full Gunner Ministry could be sworn in on 12 September. The CLP's two surviving MPs, Higgins and Finocchiaro, became leader and deputy leader of the CLP on 2 September.

Despite Labor's massive majority following the 2016 election, the new Labor government re-appointed CLP-turned-independent Kezia Purick as Speaker of the Northern Territory Legislative Assembly for another term.

== Results ==
↓
| 18 | 5 | 2 |
| ALP | Independents | CLP |

Results of the 2016 Northern Territory general election Legislative Assembly
| Party | Votes | % | +/– | Seats | +/– |
|---|---|---|---|---|---|
| Labor | 41,476 | 42.19 | ▲5.73 | 18 | +10 |
| Country Liberal | 31,263 | 31.80 | ▼18.83 | 2 | –14 |
| Independents | 18,511 | 18.83 | ▲12.79 | 5 | +4 |
| 1 Territory | 3,520 | 3.58 | New | 0 | ±0 |
| Greens | 2,817 | 2.87 | ▼0.43 | 0 | ±0 |
| Shooters and Fishers | 523 | 0.53 | New | 0 | ±0 |
| Citizens Electoral Council | 189 | 0.19 | New | 0 | ±0 |
| Total | 98,299 | 100.00 | – | 25 | – |
| Valid votes | 98,299 | 98.00 | | | |
| Invalid/blank votes | 2,005 | 2.00 | –1.2 | | |
| Total votes | 100,304 | 100.00 | – | | |
| Registered voters/turnout | 135,506 | 74.02 | –2.9 | | |
| Labor | 51,533 | 57.48 | | | |
| Country Liberal | 38,123 | 42.52 | | | |
| Total | 89,656 | 100.00 | | | |

Independents: Robyn Lambley (Araluen), Terry Mills (Blain), Kezia Purick (Goyder), Gerry Wood (Nelson), Yingiya Mark Guyula (Nhulunbuy)

Primary vote
| Labor | 42.2% |
| Country Liberal | 31.8% |
| 1 Territory | 3.6% |
| Greens | 2.9% |
| Shooters and Fishers | 0.5% |
| CEC | 0.2% |
| Independents | 18.8% |

Two-party-preferred vote
| Labor | 58.5% |
| Country Liberal | 41.5% |

Seats
| Labor | 72.0% |
| Country Liberal | 8.0% |
| Independents | 20.0% |

Winning party in the territory's 25 divisions.

Labor went into the election as unbackable favourites, with Northern Territory opinion polls indicating a massive swing against the CLP—as much as 19 points, by at least one account (see below). Giles later admitted that he'd known almost as soon as the writs were dropped that the CLP would not be reelected, but felt he had to keep up appearances to maintain morale.

As expected, Labor swept the CLP from power in a massive landslide. It won 58.5 percent of the two-party vote on a swing of 14.3 percentage points, the largest two-party swing on record for a Territory election. It is only the second time Territory Labor has won a majority of the two-party vote at an election.

By only four percentage points, Labor won the third-largest majority government in Territory history, with 72 percent of the 25-seat Assembly. This was only bettered by Labor's landslide victory in 2005, when Labor won 19 seats (76 percent of the seats), and the first election in 1974, in which the CLP only faced two independents as opposition.

ABC election analyst Antony Green called the election for Labor at 6:41 pm Darwin time, less than an hour after counting began. Giles phoned Gunner to concede defeat just after 9 pm, and Gunner publicly claimed victory an hour later. Only one seat had been definitively called for the CLP by Sunday morning, with a second called on Monday morning.

The CLP lost a number of seats on swings of well over 10 percentage points. In some seats, the CLP suffered swings virtually unheard of in Australian politics. For example, Bess Price, one of several indigenous CLP members elected in 2012, was routed in her seat of Stuart, suffering a swing of nearly 31 points to Labor—easily the largest swing of the election (not counting swings picked up by former CLP members contesting as independents). The CLP was all but wiped out in the Darwin/Palmerston area, losing all but one seat there. This was all the more remarkable since Labor had historically run dead in Palmerston for most of the Legislative Assembly's existence. Labor picked up two Palmerston seats in its 2005 landslide, only to lose them both to the CLP in 2008.

By Sunday morning, Giles was trailing in his own seat of Braitling. He'd gone into the election sitting on a seemingly insurmountable majority of 19.6 percent after the redistribution. However, the ABC showed him trailing Labor challenger Dale Wakefield with counting still underway. Ultimately, Labor took the seat on a swing of almost 20 points, making Giles only the second Majority Leader/Chief Minister and the third major-party leader in the Territory to lose his own seat. With former CLP member-turned-independent Robyn Lambley having retained the other Alice Springs-based seat, Araluen as an independent, Giles' defeat meant that the CLP was completely shut out in its other traditional stronghold for the first time ever.

Also of note, former Deputy Chief Minister Willem Westra van Holthe lost his seat of Katherine to Labor. Going into the election, Westra van Holthe sat on a majority of 22.3 percent, making Katherine the safest seat in the Territory. However, Westra van Holthe's primary vote almost halved, enabling Labor challenger Sandra Nelson to oust him by 33 votes. Earlier, Green said that it would "truly be a disaster" for the CLP if both Braitling and Katherine fell to Labor; neither had ever been won by Labor before 2016. The only blemish on Labor's otherwise massive victory came when deputy leader Lynne Walker, who had been tipped to become Deputy Chief Minister, lost in her own seat of Nhulunbuy to independent candidate Yingiya Mark Guyula by a mere eight votes. However, Labor left open the possibility of challenging the result.

Although the CLP had fewer members than the independents, Territory Solicitor-General Sonia Brownhill SC advised that the independents should not be recognised as the Official Opposition because they did not have a realistic chance of forming an alternative government. While Labor was the only party to win enough seats for official party status in the legislature, Gunner promised that the CLP would be properly resourced as an opposition.

With the overall result beyond doubt, Gunner had himself, Natasha Fyles, and Nicole Manison sworn in as an interim three-person government on 31 August until the full Gunner Ministry could be sworn in on 12 September.

On 2 September, Higgins became leader of what remained of the CLP, and hence Opposition Leader, with Finocchiaro as his deputy.

=== Post-election pendulum ===
Labor seats
Marginal
| Braitling | Dale Wakefield | ALP | 0.3 |
| Katherine | Sandra Nelson | ALP | 0.5 |
| Karama | Ngaree Ah Kit | ALP | 0.8 v IND |
| Brennan | Tony Sievers | ALP | 2.6 |
| Port Darwin | Paul Kirby | ALP | 2.8 |
| Arafura | Lawrence Costa | ALP | 4.7 |
| Drysdale | Eva Lawler | ALP | 5.2 |
Fairly safe
| Fong Lim | Jeff Collins | ALP | 7.8 |
| Barkly | Gerry McCarthy | ALP | 8.0 v IND |
| Namatjira | Chansey Paech | ALP | 8.5 |
Safe
| Sanderson | Kate Worden | ALP | 10.5 |
| Casuarina | Lauren Moss | ALP | 11.3 |
| Fannie Bay | Michael Gunner | ALP | 14.2 |
| Arnhem | Selena Uibo | ALP | 14.3 |
| Johnston | Ken Vowles | ALP | 14.7 |
| Wanguri | Nicole Manison | ALP | 19.9 |
| Stuart | Scott McConnell | ALP | 25.4 |
| Nightcliff | Natasha Fyles | ALP | 26.9 |

Country Liberal seats
Marginal
| Daly | Gary Higgins | CLP | 2.1 |
Safe
| Spillett | Lia Finocchiaro | CLP | 13.1 |
Independent seats
| Nhulunbuy | Yingiya Mark Guyula | IND | 0.1 v ALP |
| Blain | Terry Mills | IND | 1.4 v ALP |
| Araluen | Robyn Lambley | IND | 8.2 v CLP |
| Nelson | Gerry Wood | IND | 23.0 v CLP |
| Goyder | Kezia Purick | IND | 25.3 v CLP |

=== Seats changing hands ===
| Seat | Pre-2016 election | | | Swing | Post-2016 election | | |
| Seat | Party | Member | Margin | Swing | Margin | Member | Party |
|---|---|---|---|---|---|---|---|
| Arafura | Country Liberal | Francis Xavier Kurrupuwu | 2.4 | 7.2 | 4.7 | Lawrence Costa | Labor |
| Araluen | Independent | Robyn Lambley | 20.0 (CLP) | 28.1 | 8.2 | Robyn Lambley | Independent |
| Arnhem | Independent | Larisa Lee | 4.3 (CLP) | 18.6 | 14.3 | Selena Uibo | Labor |
| Blain | Independent | Nathan Barrett | 15.1 (CLP) | N/A | 1.4 | Terry Mills | Independent |
| Braitling | Country Liberal | Adam Giles | 19.6 | 19.9 | 0.3 | Dale Wakefield | Labor |
| Brennan | Country Liberal | Peter Chandler | 14.0 | 16.6 | 2.6 | Tony Sievers | Labor |
| Drysdale | Country Liberal | Lia Finocchiaro | 11.5 | 16.6 | 5.2 | Eva Lawler | Labor |
| Fong Lim | Country Liberal | Dave Tollner | 0.2 | 7.9 | 7.8 | Jeff Collins | Labor |
| Goyder | Independent | Kezia Purick | 16.0 (CLP) | 41.3 | 25.3 | Kezia Purick | Independent |
| Karama | Independent | Delia Lawrie | 6.4 (ALP) | −5.6 | 0.8 | Ngaree Ah Kit | Labor |
| Katherine | Country Liberal | Willem Westra van Holthe | 22.3 | 22.7 | 0.5 | Sandra Nelson | Labor |
| Namatjira | Independent | Alison Anderson | 20.8 (CLP) | 29.2 | 8.5 | Chansey Paech | Labor |
| Nhulunbuy | Labor | Lynne Walker | 13.7 | 13.8 | 0.1 | Yingiya Mark Guyula | Independent |
| Port Darwin | Country Liberal | John Elferink | 9.7 | 12.5 | 2.8 | Paul Kirby | Labor |
| Sanderson | Country Liberal | Peter Styles | 3.1 | 13.6 | 10.5 | Kate Worden | Labor |
| Stuart | Country Liberal | Bess Price | 5.5 | 30.9 | 25.4 | Scott McConnell | Labor |

- Members in italics did not re-contest their Legislative Assembly seats at this election.

== Candidates ==
Sitting members are listed in bold. Successful candidates are highlighted in the relevant colour. Where there is possible confusion, an asterisk is used.

| Electorate | Held by | Labor | CLP | Greens | 1TP | Other |
|---|---|---|---|---|---|---|
| Arafura | CLP | Lawrence Costa | **Francis Xavier Kurrupuwu** | | Jon Lotu | Tristan Mungatopi (Ind) |
| Araluen | CLP | Adam Findlay | Stephen Brown | | | **Robyn Lambley** (Ind) |
| Arnhem | CLP | Selena Uibo | Ian Gumbula | | James Gaykamangu | Lance Lawrence (Ind); **Larisa Lee** (Ind) |
| Barkly | Labor | **Gerry McCarthy** | Tony Jack | | | Jack Green (Ind); Elliot McAdam (Ind) |
| Blain | CLP | Damian Hale | Marie-Clare Boothby | | | Gregory Knowles (Ind); Terry Mills* (Ind) |
| Braitling | CLP | Dale Wakefield | **Adam Giles** | Dalton Dupuy | | Jane Clark (Ind); Alfred Gould (Ind); Eli Melky (Ind); Phil Walcott (Ind) |
| Brennan | CLP | Tony Sievers | **Peter Chandler** | | Dorothy Fox | |
| Casuarina | Labor | **Lauren Moss** | Giovanna Webb | | | |
| Daly | CLP | Anthony Venes | **Gary Higgins** | | Joan Growden | Ian Barry (CEC); Thong Sum Lee (Ind); Regina McCarthy (Ind); Allan McKay (Ind); Kevin Wanganeen (Ind) |
| Drysdale | CLP | Eva Lawler | Ben Hosking | Hayden Bray | David Cartwright | Margy Kerle (Ind); Lyle Mackay (Ind) |
| Fannie Bay | Labor | **Michael Gunner** | Karen Brown | | Greg Strettles | |
| Fong Lim | CLP | Jeff Collins | Tim Dixon | | Sue Fraser-Adams | Ilana Eldridge (Ind) |
| Goyder | CLP | Mick Taylor | Carolyn Reynolds | Billee McGinley | | Peter Flynn (CEC); **Kezia Purick*** (Ind) |
| Johnston | Labor | **Ken Vowles** | Steven Klose | Melanie Ross | | |
| Karama | Labor | Ngaree Ah Kit | Jarred Ilett | | Edward Solo | Jimmy Gimini (Ind); Sonja Jebbink (Ind); Trevor Jenkins (-); **Delia Lawrie** (Ind) |
| Katherine | CLP | Sandra Nelson | **Willem Westra van Holthe** | | Braedon Earley | Leon Cellier (Ind); Dean David (Ind); Chris Righton (SFP) |
| Namatjira | CLP | Chansey Paech | Heidi Williams | Vincent Forrester | | Alan Keeling (Ind) |
| Nelson | Independent | Kirsty Hunt | Gerard Maley | | | Brigid McCullough (CEC); Marty Reinhold (SFP); **Gerry Wood*** (Ind) |
| Nhulunbuy | Labor | **Lynne Walker** | Charles Yunupingu | | | Jackson Anni (Ind); Yingiya Mark Guyula* (Ind) |
| Nightcliff | Labor | **Natasha Fyles** | Ted Dunstan | Matt Haubrick | | |
| Port Darwin | CLP | Paul Kirby | Rohan Kelly | | David Cameron | Matthew Baker (Ind); Carol Phayer (Ind); Kenneth Wu (Ind) |
| Sanderson | CLP | Kate Worden | **Peter Styles** | | Trudi Andersson | Andrew Arthur (Ind); Thomas Lynch (Ind) |
| Spillett | CLP | Phil Tilbrook | **Lia Finocchiaro** | | Jeff Norton | Trudy Campbell (CEC); Sonia Mackay (Ind); Richard Smith (Ind) |
| Stuart | CLP | Scott McConnell | **Bess Price** | | Andi Bracey | Maurie Ryan (Ind) |
| Wanguri | Labor | **Nicole Manison** | Steven Doherty | | | Shauna Mounsey (Ind); Jan Pile (Ind) |

== Opinion polling ==
An opinion poll conducted by ReachTEL and commissioned by The Australian which surveyed 1036 residents via robocall on the afternoon of Sunday 1 March 2015, a month after the 2015 CLP leadership spill, across all 18 electorates in Darwin, Palmerston and Alice Springs indicated a 17.6-point two-party swing against the incumbent CLP government since the last election. Had this been repeated at a general election, it would have delivered a comprehensive victory for Labor.

The Northern Territory News commissioned its own MediaReach poll in late July 2016, more than a week before the writ was formally dropped. It showed the two-party swing had further widened to 19 points in favour of the opposition Labor Party. Had this been repeated at a general election, it would have resulted in a landslide Labor victory. It also showed Labor leading by substantial margins in the Darwin area, including a 63–37 percent two-party margin in Palmerston, a conservative bastion for most of the last four decades. This suggested that the CLP was in danger of losing most, if not all, of its parliamentary representation in the Darwin/Palmerston area. The same poll also showed that Labor leader Michael Gunner had a substantial lead over Giles as preferred chief minister.

In what proved to be a warning sign, the 2016 federal election saw a 7.4 percent swing to Labor, which would have been more than enough for a Labor victory had this been repeated at a general election. The CLP also suffered large swings in the Territory's two seats. Solomon, which is largely coextensive with the Darwin/Palmerston area, saw CLP incumbent Natasha Griggs rolled by Labor challenger Luke Gosling on a swing of more than seven points. Warren Snowdon, the Labor member for Lingiari, which covers the rest of the Territory, picked up a healthy swing of seven points.

=== Voting intention ===
| Date | Primary vote | | | | TPP vote |
| Date | CLP | ALP | GRN | OTH | CLP | ALP |
|---|---|---|---|---|---|---|
| 27–29 Jul 2016^{1} | 26% | 36% | 6% | 29% | 36% | 64% |
| 1 Mar 2015^{3} | 34.4% | 41.8% | 8.8% | 15.0% | 38.2% | 61.8% |
| 25 Aug 2012 election | 50.6% | 36.5% | 3.3% | 9.6% | 55.8% | 44.2% |

1. 3% of voters recorded their intentions as undecided.
2. 13.7% of voters were initially undecided as to their primary vote, with the CLP on 30.2%, the ALP on 38.0%, the Greens on 6.9% and others on 11.3%. Asked which party the 13.7% undecided had "even a slight leaning" for: 30.8% to the CLP, 27.9% to the ALP, 13.7% to the Greens and 27.7% to others. As a proportion of 13.7%, this equated to CLP 4.2%, ALP 3.8%, Greens 1.9%, other 3.8%, which have been added to the initial totals in the table.

==== By region ====
===== Alice Springs =====
| Date | Primary vote | | | | TPP vote |
| Date | CLP | ALP | GRN | OTH | CLP | ALP |
|---|---|---|---|---|---|---|
| 27-29 Jul 2016 | not asked | | | | 37% | 63% |
| 18-22 May 2016 | 28% | 24% | N/A | 25% | not asked |

===== Darwin CBD =====
| Date | Primary vote | | | | TPP vote |
| Date | CLP | ALP | GRN | OTH | CLP | ALP |
|---|---|---|---|---|---|---|
| 18-22 May 2016 | not asked | | | | 44% | 56% |

===== Darwin outskirts =====
| Date | Primary vote | | | | TPP vote |
| Date | CLP | ALP | GRN | OTH | CLP | ALP |
|---|---|---|---|---|---|---|
| 18-22 May 2016 | not asked | | | | 46% | 54% |

===== Northern Darwin =====
| Date | Primary vote | | | | TPP vote |
| Date | ALP | CLP | GRN | OTH | ALP | CLP |
|---|---|---|---|---|---|---|
| 18-22 May 2016 | not asked | | | | 78% | 22% |

===== Palmerston =====
| Date | Primary vote | | | | TPP vote |
| Date | CLP | ALP | GRN | OTH | CLP | ALP |
|---|---|---|---|---|---|---|
| 18-22 May 2016 | not asked | | | | 37% | 63% |

==== By seat ====
===== Braitling =====
| Date | Primary vote | | | | TPP vote |
| Date | CLP | ALP | GRN | OTH | CLP | ALP |
|---|---|---|---|---|---|---|
| 27-29 Jul 2016 | 42% | 37% | not asked |
| 25 Aug 2012 election | 67.6% | 17.5% | 9.1% | 5.8% | 73.6% | 26.4% |

=== Leadership polling ===
Better Chief Minister and satisfaction polling*
| Date | Firm | Better Chief Minister | | Giles | | Gunner |
| Date | Firm | Giles | Gunner | Satisfied | Dissatisfied | Satisfied | Dissatisfied |
|---|---|---|---|---|---|---|---|
| 18-22 May 2016 | NT News (Note: Polling conducted in Alice Springs. Respondents were also asked questions related to federal politics, which saw then-Prime Minister and Liberal leader Malcolm Turnbull have a net positive rating, while then-Opposition Leader and Labor leader Bill Shorten have a net negative rating.) | not asked | | 34% | 47% | not asked |
| 1 Aug 2016 | NT News | 29% | 46% | not asked |
| 14 Mar 2016 | NT News | 35% | 38% | not asked |

== Timing ==
The timing of the election is dictated by the Northern Territory Electoral Act. Section 23 of the Act fixes polling day as the fourth Saturday in August of the fourth year after the previous election (unless that election had been an extraordinary election). The last election was in 2012, and was a regular election. Therefore, the next election was scheduled for Saturday, 27 August 2016.

An earlier election was possible in the event that a motion of no confidence in the government was passed by the assembly. Section 24 of the act states that an early election can be called if a motion of no confidence in the NT government is passed by the assembly, and no new government can secure the assembly's confidence within eight days. The original confidence motion must be tabled with at least three days' notice. Alternatively, section 25 mandates an early election if the assembly rejects an appropriation bill.

== Background ==
The Terry Mills-led CLP opposition defeated the Paul Henderson-led Labor government at the 2012 election, winning 16 of 25 seats.

Adam Giles was elected by the CLP party-room to replace Mills as Chief Minister and CLP leader less than a year later at the 2013 CLP leadership ballot. Giles became the first indigenous head of government of an Australian state or territory.

Resulting from the 2015 CLP leadership ballot on 2 February, the possibility of a confidence motion being put to the assembly was raised by Willem Westra van Holthe to take over the leadership from Giles, however Giles managed to retain the leadership and continued to govern.

Five months later, in July 2015, CLP member Kezia Purick defected from the party, the fourth parliamentarian to leave the CLP since the previous election, reducing the CLP to minority government. Giles raised the possibility of an early election on 20 July stating that he would "love" to call a snap poll, but that it was "pretty much impossible to do". Crossbenchers dismissed the notion of voting against a confidence motion to bring down the government.

== Redistribution ==
A redistribution of the Northern Territory's electoral boundaries commenced in February 2015, with draft boundaries released in June. Once finalised, these boundaries would apply to the 2016 general election.

On 16 June 2015, the NTEC released their proposals for redistribution. Major changes included in the proposal were:

- A new seat called Spillett would be created in the northern parts of Palmerston
- Alice Springs would lose a seat due to its current three seats being under quota, with Araluen merging with the large rural seat of Stuart to form a new seat, Battarbee
- Two seats would be renamed: Nhulunbuy would become Milirrpum, and Wanguri would become Somerville
- The two retained districts of Drysdale and Fong Lim would lose over half of their existing electorates
- More minor changes would be made to the boundaries of all but five of the remaining districts

A period of thirty days in which interested parties and individuals could lodge objections ended on 16 July 2015.

On 16 September 2015, the NTEC released their final report into boundaries for 2016 and beyond. The changes that occurred were less severe than those proposed in June:

- The proposed new seat of Spillett was created to the north of Palmerston but has a slightly different composition
- Araluen and Stuart were retained with the division of Greatorex being abolished. Its electors were transferred to Araluen, Braitling and Namatjira
- The seats of Nhulunbuy and Wanguri were retained
- Drysdale and Fong Lim saw smaller changes than previously proposed
- Four seats remained completely unchanged by the proposals – Karama, Katherine, Nightcliff and Sanderson

Following the completion of the final report, it was tabled in the assembly on 16 September 2015.

== Election timetable ==
- 8 August – Issue of the writ
- 10 August – Close of electoral roll
- 12 August – Close of candidate nominations
- 15 August – Postal and early voting commences
- 27 August – Election day
- 31 August – Giles Ministry resigns, interim Gunner Ministry sworn in
- 5 September – A recount is held in five seats where the winning margin is fewer than 100 votes (Blain, Braitling, Karama, Katherine and Nhulunbuy)
- 9 September – Deadline for the receipt of postal votes
- 12 September – The writ was returned to the Administrator and the result formally declared

== Retiring MPs ==
=== Country Liberal ===
- Matt Conlan MLA (Greatorex) – announced retirement 17 March 2015
- John Elferink MLA (Port Darwin) – announced retirement 19 November 2015
- Dave Tollner MLA (Fong Lim) – lost preselection for Spillett 28 November 2015

=== Independent ===
- Alison Anderson MLA (Namatjira) – elected as CLP; announced retirement 3 August 2016
- Nathan Barrett MLA (Blain) – elected as CLP; announced retirement 12 June 2016

== Electoral pendulum ==
The following pendulum is known as the Mackerras pendulum, invented by psephologist Malcolm Mackerras. The pendulum works by lining up all of the seats held in the Legislative Assembly according to the percentage point margin they are held by on a two-party-preferred basis. This is also known as the swing required for the seat to change hands. Given a uniform swing to the opposition or government parties, the number of seats that change hands can be predicted.

=== Pre-election pendulum ===
Incumbent members who have become and remained an independent since the 2012 election are indicated in grey.

Members listed in italics did not re-contest their seat at the election.

Country Liberal seats
Marginal
| Fong Lim | Dave Tollner | CLP | 0.2 |
| Arafura | Francis Xavier Kurrupuwu | CLP | 2.4 |
| Sanderson | Peter Styles | CLP | 3.1 |
| Arnhem | Larisa Lee | CLP | 4.3 |
| Daly | Gary Higgins | CLP | 5.2 |
| Stuart | Bess Price | CLP | 5.5 |
Fairly safe
| Port Darwin | John Elferink | CLP | 9.7 |
Safe
| Drysdale | Lia Finocchiaro | CLP | 11.5 |
| Blain | Nathan Barrett | CLP | 13.2 |
| Brennan | Peter Chandler | CLP | 14.0 |
| Goyder | Kezia Purick | CLP | 16.0 |
| Spillett | new seat | CLP | 17.9 |
| Braitling | Adam Giles | CLP | 19.6 |
| Araluen | Robyn Lambley | CLP | 20.0 |
| Namatjira | Alison Anderson | CLP | 20.8 |
| Katherine | Willem Westra van Holthe | CLP | 22.3 |

Labor seats
Marginal
Fairly safe
| Fannie Bay | Michael Gunner | ALP | 6.4 |
| Karama | Delia Lawrie | ALP | 6.4 |
| Johnston | Ken Vowles | ALP | 6.6 |
| Wanguri | Nicole Manison | ALP | 6.9 |
| Barkly | Gerry McCarthy | ALP | 7.6 |
| Casuarina | Lauren Moss | ALP | 8.9 |
| Nightcliff | Natasha Fyles | ALP | 9.2 |
Safe
| Nhulunbuy | Lynne Walker | ALP | 13.7 |
Independent seats
| Nelson | Gerry Wood | IND | 9.2 v CLP |

== See also ==
- Members of the Northern Territory Legislative Assembly, 2012–2016
- Members of the Northern Territory Legislative Assembly, 2016–2020
