= Jeff Collins (Australian politician) =

Australian politician

Member of the Northern Territory Legislative Assembly for Fong Lim
- In office 27 August 2016 – 22 August 2020
- Preceded by: Dave Tollner
- Succeeded by: Mark Monaghan

Personal details
- Born: Jeffrey David Collins; 27 October 1961 (age 64) Sydney, New South Wales, Australia
- Party: Territory Alliance (2020–)
- Other political affiliations: Independent (2019–2020); Labor (1986–2019)
- Education: University of Sydney; University of Technology Sydney
- Occupation: Lawyer

Jeffrey David Collins (born 27 October 1961) is an Australian politician. He was a member of the Northern Territory Legislative Assembly from 2016 to 2020, representing the electorate of Fong Lim. He was member of the governing Labor Party, but was one of three MPs excluded from the Labor caucus on 21 December 2018 over alleged criticism of the government, and resigned from the party on 8 February 2019 to sit as an independent. In March 2020 he joined the Territory Alliance as its second MP.

== Early life and career ==
Collins was an electrician and a firefighter before gaining a Bachelor of Arts from the University of Sydney and a law degree at the University of Technology, Sydney. He worked as a senior solicitor at Colin Biggers & Paisley, and as a barrister for Edmund Barton Chambers in Sydney. He moved to Darwin in 2012, working as a special counsel with Clayton Utz and then with Ward Keller. He was treasurer of the Law Society NT and a member of the National Human Rights Committee of the Law Council of Australia.

He has four children living in NSW.

== Politics ==
Northern Territory Legislative Assembly
Years	Term	Electoral division	Party
2016–2019	13th	Fong Lim	Labor
2019–2020	Changed allegiance to:		Independent
2020	Changed allegiance to:		Territory Alliance

Collins joined the ALP in mid-1980s. He was elected to the Northern Territory Legislative Assembly in 2016 in the electoral division of Fong Lim, previously held by Dave Tollner, who did not recontest after losing preselection for the new safer seat of Spillett. The seat had been significantly redistributed before the election, losing all of its area near Palmerston and all but erasing the Country Liberal majority. Amid the CLP's collapse in Darwin at that election, Collins won the seat for Labor on a swing of over eight percent.

In 2017, Collins chaired a Select Committee on Opening Parliament to the People which resulted in a fundamental change to the way bills passing through the Northern Territory Legislative Assembly were scrutinised.

Also in 2017, Collins travelled to Portugal to undertake a study of the 2001 Portuguese Drug Strategy, and became a vocal proponent of the harm minimisation approach to drug laws.

In March 2020, Collins joined the Territory Alliance, citing its "ideology-free" nature and stating: "What I am interested in is being part of the next government in an effective manner that helps policy development, and legislation development and passage, that benefits all of the territory".

Northern Territory Legislative Assembly
Preceded by Dave Tollner	Member for Fong Lim; 2016–2020	Succeeded by Mark Monaghan
