= Gary Higgins =

Australian politician

12th Leader of the Opposition in the Northern Territory
- In office 2 September 2016 – 1 February 2020
- Deputy: Lia Finocchiaro
- Preceded by: Michael Gunner
- Succeeded by: Lia Finocchiaro

Leader of the Country Liberal Party
- In office 2 September 2016 – 1 February 2020
- Deputy: Lia Finocchiaro
- Preceded by: Adam Giles
- Succeeded by: Lia Finocchiaro

Member of the Northern Territory Legislative Assembly for Daly
- In office 25 August 2012 – 30 July 2020
- Preceded by: Rob Knight
- Succeeded by: Ian Sloan

Personal details
- Born: Gary John Higgins; 26 May 1954 (age 71) Griffith, New South Wales, Australia
- Party: Country Liberal Party
- Spouse: Rhonda Higgins
- Occupation: Mango farmer, public servant

Gary John Higgins (born 26 May 1954) is an Australian former politician. A member of the Country Liberal Party, he was elected to represent the seat of Daly in the Northern Territory Legislative Assembly at the 2012 election. After the 2016 election, the CLP was reduced to only two members in the Legislative Assembly, with Higgins becoming party leader and Leader of the Opposition. Following health problems, he resigned both positions in favour of Lia Finocchiaro in February 2020, and retired at the 2020 election.

== Early life ==
Higgins moved to the Northern Territory in 1986, and was employed in the Territory public service, where he became Director of Corporate Services at the Attorney-General's office. After leaving the public service, he bought the Daly River Mango Farm, a mango orchard and tourist park on the Daly River.

== Parliament ==
Northern Territory Legislative Assembly
Years	Term	Electoral division	Party
2012–2016	12th	Daly	Country Liberal
2016–2020	13th	Daly	Country Liberal

He joined the Giles Ministry in February 2015, becoming Minister for Sport and Recreation, Minister for Senior Territorians, Minister for the Environment, and Minister assisting the Minister for Arts and Museums.

== CLP leadership ==
The CLP was defeated in a landslide at the 2016 election. Higgins was one of only two CLP candidates to be elected, and the only surviving member of the previous cabinet. Even before it was confirmed that former Chief Minister Adam Giles had lost his own seat, it was announced on 2 September 2016 that Higgins would succeed him as CLP leader, and hence Opposition Leader. The only other CLP member in the legislature, Lia Finocchiaro, became his deputy.

Higgins faced the task of rebuilding a party that had just suffered one of the worst defeats of a sitting government at the state or territory level in Australia. Although the CLP had fewer members than the independents, the CLP was recognised as the Official Opposition after the Solicitor-General advised that the five independents could not realistically form an alternative government. Although the CLP was well short of the numbers for official status in the chamber, the new Labor government of Michael Gunner promised that the CLP would be properly resourced as an opposition.

As they were the only opposition members of the legislature, Higgins and Finocchiaro divided all shadow portfolios between them. Higgins served as Shadow Treasurer and Shadow Minister for Aboriginal Affairs, Infrastructure, Planning and Logistics, Housing and Community Development, Tourism and Culture, Environment and Natural Resources, Public Employment, Corporate and Information Services, Primary Industry and Resources and Northern Australia.

On 20 January 2020, Higgins announced his resignation as leader of the Country Liberals, citing health problems, and confirmed he would retire from the Legislative Assembly at the next Territory election in August 2020. His deputy, and the only other Country Liberal MP in the assembly, Lia Finocchiaro succeeded him as party and opposition leader on 1 February.

== Political positions ==
Higgins is a republican and supports Northern Territory statehood.

Northern Territory Legislative Assembly
Preceded by Rob Knight	Member for Daly; 2012–2020	Succeeded by Ian Sloan
Political offices
Preceded by Michael Gunner	Leader of the Opposition in the Northern Territory; 2016–2020	Succeeded by Lia Finocchiaro
Party political offices
Preceded by Adam Giles	Leader of the Country Liberal Party; 2016–2020	Succeeded by Lia Finocchiaro
