= Electoral division of Spillett =

Spillett Northern Territory—Legislative Assembly
- Interactive map of boundaries as of the 2024 election
- Territory: Northern Territory
- Created: 2016
- MP: Lia Finocchiaro
- Party: Country Liberal
- Namesake: Peter Spillett
- Electors: 6,419 (2026)
- Area: 67 km^{2} (25.9 sq mi)
- Demographic: Urban
Electorates around Spillett:
Nelson	Nelson	Nelson
Nelson	Spillett	Nelson
Nelson	Drysdale; Brennan	Nelson

Spillett is a division of the Northern Territory Legislative Assembly in Australia. It was created in 2016, for the 2016 general elections, and surrounds Palmerston. It is named for Peter Spillett, a historian and former member of Darwin City Council.

Historically, Palmerston has been a stronghold for the conservative Country Liberal Party. However, Spillett is based on a particularly conservative portion of Palmerston. It was created with a notional CLP majority of 17.9 percent, making it on paper the CLP's safest seat.

== History ==
Before the election Lia Finocchiaro, the then-CLP member for Drysdale, opted to transfer to Spillett after much of her old base was redistributed there. She defeated former Treasurer Dave Tollner for preselection; Tollner had contested Spillett after his old seat of Fong Lim saw most of its more conservative sections transferred to Spillett, resulting in Fong Lim becoming extremely marginal.

Finocchiaro weathered the massive Labor wave that swept through the Territory at the 2016 election—a wave that saw Labor win her old seat of Drysdale on a large swing. In the end, Finocchiaro proved to be in the least danger of the CLP's elected members. She was the only CLP member to win a majority of the primary vote, and went on to win with only a small two-party swing against her. This left Spillett as the only CLP seat in the metropolitan area, and the only safe CLP seat in the legislature. After the election, Finocchiaro was named deputy leader of what remained of the CLP, and hence Deputy Leader of the Opposition. She then became Leader of the Opposition after Gary Higgins's retirement in 2020.

== Demographics ==
A large portion of voters in Spillett are military personnel.

== Members for Spillett ==
Image	Member	Party	Term	Notes
	Lia Finocchiaro (1984–)	Country Liberal	27 August 2016 – present	Previously member for Drysdale. CLP leader since 2020 and Chief Minister since 2024. Incumbent

== Election results ==
2024 Northern Territory general election: Spillett
Party	Candidate	Votes	%	±%
Country Liberal	Lia Finocchiaro	3,712	79.6	+23.5
Labor	Caleb Burke	952	20.4	−12.5
Total formal votes		4,664	97.5	+0.2
Informal votes		121	2.5	−0.2
Turnout		4,785	78.5	
Country Liberal hold		Swing	+16.1	
