= Territory Alliance =

- Abbreviation: TA; Alliance
- Leader: Terry Mills
- Founded: 31 August 2019; 6 years ago
- Dissolved: c. 2020; 6 years ago
- Ideology: Regionalism
- Political position: Big tent
- Legislative Assembly: 3 / 25 (2020)
- Alice Springs Town Council: 1 / 9 (2020)

Website
- territoryalliance.org

Territory Alliance (TA) was an Australian political party based in the Northern Territory. It was founded in 2019 by Terry Mills, an incumbent member of the Northern Territory Legislative Assembly and former Chief Minister of the Northern Territory. He had been elected as a member of the Country Liberal Party (CLP).

In March 2020, two additional independent MLAs joined the party, Jeff Collins (independent, formerly Australian Labor Party) and Robyn Lambley (formerly CLP). This saw the Alliance surpass the CLP as the second-largest party in the Legislative Assembly, but failed to gain official opposition status after a secret ballot of non-Government members of the Legislative Assembly instead recognised the CLP in a 5-3 vote.

Despite hopes of forming government in its own right, or a coalition with the CLP or Labor in a minority government, the party was left with only one seat following the 2020 Territory election. With Robyn Lambley's departure from the Territory Alliance, the party was left with no representation in the Legislative Assembly.

== History ==
In March 2020 the Alliance gained its second MP, former Australian Labor Party (ALP) member Jeff Collins, who had been expelled from the ALP in 2018. Collins' decision to join the Alliance saw it draw level with the CLP as the equal second-largest party in the Assembly. This prompted Mills to suggest his party had a claim to the status of official opposition.

On 18 March 2020, independent MLA and former CLP deputy chief minister Robyn Lambley announced that she was joining the Alliance. This gave the party its third MLA and saw it pass the CLP as the second-largest parliamentary party. However, less than a week after claiming opposition status, CLP leader Lia Finocchiaro put a motion to the Legislative Assembly seeking recognition of the official opposition, which the CLP won in a 5-3 vote (with the Labor Government abstaining and the three independents favouring the CLP).

Lambley was the only member of Territory Alliance to be re-elected in the 2020 general election, narrowly retaining her seat despite an 8.1% swing against her. In October 2020, Lambley confirmed she had resigned from the party and would once again represent Araluen as an independent. This leaves Territory Alliance with no parliamentary representation in the Northern Territory Legislative Assembly.

== Ideology and positions ==
Territory Alliance has promoted itself as an "ideology-free" alternative to the Northern Territory's two major parties, the centre-left Australian Labor Party (ALP) and centre-right Country Liberal Party (CLP).

In November 2019, Mills announced that the party's key issues would be "law and order" and "youth crime", while party secretary and Charles Darwin University law lecturer Danial Kelly said that the new party would be "non-religious". The party's first candidate announcements for the 2020 Northern Territory general election included Kelly and Regina McCarthy, a former candidate for the defunct far-right Rise Up Australia Party. The selection of McCarthy, as well as Kelly's "strong religious conservative" views, led the Northern Territory News to describe the party's candidates as having a "far-right tinge". McCarthy stated that her views had "evolved" since her RUAP candidacy in the 2019 federal election.

Incumbent MLA Jeff Collins, who joined the Alliance in March 2020, had been elected as a member of the ALP and is a "vocal advocate of progressive issues such as drug decriminalisation". He has stated that the "left/right ideological dichotomy [...] has not produced good government for us" and that more conservative members of the party "still are people I can have conversations with". The Alliance preferenced the Greens ahead of the ALP and CLP at the 2020 Johnston by-election. Another former Labor MLA, Ken Parish, joined the party in early 2020.

In June 2020, the party announced its policy of a ban on fracking.

== Election results ==
In December 2019, the party announced that their candidate in the 2020 Johnston by-election would be Steven Klose, the CLP candidate for the seat at the previous election. Klose finished runner-up to the ALP candidate Joel Bowden on both first preferences (22.2 percent) and the two-party preferred vote (47.4 percent).

At the 2020 Northern Territory general election, Territory Alliance contested 21 of the 25 seats in the parliament, holding hopes of building on their three seats to hold the balance of power in a hung parliament, with Mills even saying his intention was to win government outright. However, the ambitions of the party were dashed as leader Mills lost his seat of Blain, and Jeff Collins the seat of Fong Lim (both to Labor). The party failed to gain any other seats, leaving Robyn Lambley (Araluen) the only remaining member in the parliament.

However, in October 2020 Lambley confirmed that she had resigned from party to sit in parliament as an independent. Before her resignation, Territory Alliance had considered expelling Lambley for reasons including not being a "team player".

== See also ==
- 2020 Northern Territory opposition leadership dispute
