= Results of the 2005 Northern Territory general election =

Northern Territory general election, 18 June 2005 Legislative Assembly << 2001–2008 >>
Enrolled voters	111,954				
Votes cast	89,646		Turnout	80.07%	–0.49%
Informal votes	3,358		Informal	3.75%	–0.52%
Summary of votes by party
Party	Primary votes	%	Swing	Seats	Change
Labor	44,822	51.94%	+11.34%	19	+ 6
Country Liberal	30,827	35.73%	–9.65%	4	– 6
Independent	7,045	8.16%	–2.32%	2	± 0
Greens	3,594	4.17%	+4.17%	0	± 0
Total	86,288			25	
Two-party-preferred
Labor	51,026	59.1%	+11.1%		
Country Liberal	35,262	40.9%	–11.1%		

This is a list of electoral division results for the Northern Territory 2005 General Election.

== Results by Electoral Division ==
=== Arafura ===
2005 Northern Territory general election: Arafura
Party	Candidate	Votes	%	±%
Labor	Marion Scrymgour	1,864	64.2	+18.6
Country Liberal	August Stevens	648	22.3	−1.6
Greens	George Pascoe	392	13.5	+13.5
Total formal votes		2,904	95.1	+3.8
Informal votes		149	4.9	−3.8
Turnout		3,053	66.2	
Two-party-preferred result
Labor	Marion Scrymgour	2,137	73.6	+13.6
Country Liberal	August Stevens	767	26.4	−13.6
Labor hold		Swing	+13.6	

=== Araluen ===
2005 Northern Territory general election: Araluen
Party	Candidate	Votes	%	±%
Country Liberal	Jodeen Carney	1,945	53.9	+12.8
Labor	John Gaynor	1,332	36.9	+4.5
Greens	Alan Tyley	333	9.2	+9.2
Total formal votes		3,610	97.0	+1.4
Informal votes		110	3.0	−1.4
Turnout		3,720	82.1	
Two-party-preferred result
Country Liberal	Jodeen Carney	2,067	57.3	+5.3
Labor	John Gaynor	1,543	42.7	−5.3
Country Liberal hold		Swing	+5.3	

=== Arnhem ===
2005 Northern Territory general election: Arnhem
Party	Candidate	Votes	%	±%
Labor	Barbara McCarthy	1,919	67.2	+11.3
Country Liberal	Djuwalpi Marika	652	22.8	−10.3
Greens	Lance Lawrence	285	10.0	+10.0
Total formal votes		2,856	93.5	+3.5
Informal votes		200	6.5	−3.5
Turnout		3,056	64.2	
Two-party-preferred result
Labor	Barbara McCarthy	2,110	73.9	+12.5
Country Liberal	Djuwalpi Marika	746	26.1	−12.5
Labor hold		Swing	+12.5	

=== Barkly ===
2005 Northern Territory general election: Barkly
Party	Candidate	Votes	%	±%
Labor	Elliot McAdam	2,135	71.4	+13.8
Country Liberal	Val Dyer	767	25.7	+1.2
Independent	Janeen Bulsey	87	2.9	+2.9
Total formal votes		2,989	96.2	−0.2
Informal votes		118	3.8	+0.2
Turnout		3,107	74.1	
Two-party-preferred result
Labor	Elliot McAdam	2,183	73.0	+9.6
Country Liberal	Val Dyer	806	27.0	−9.6
Labor hold		Swing	+9.6	

=== Blain ===
2005 Northern Territory general election: Blain
Party	Candidate	Votes	%	±%
Country Liberal	Terry Mills	1,933	51.9	−12.1
Labor	Brendan Cabry	1,415	38.0	+8.7
Greens	Sue McKinnon	273	7.3	+7.3
Independent	Duncan Dean	104	2.8	+2.8
Total formal votes		3,725	96.5	+0.3
Informal votes		136	3.5	−0.3
Turnout		3,861	86.3	
Two-party-preferred result
Country Liberal	Terry Mills	2,131	57.2	−9.5
Labor	Brendan Cabry	1,594	42.8	+9.5
Country Liberal hold		Swing	−9.5	

=== Braitling ===
2005 Northern Territory general election: Braitling
Party	Candidate	Votes	%	±%
Country Liberal	Michael Jones	1,613	45.7	+6.1
Independent	Loraine Braham	1,140	32.3	−1.7
Labor	Sue West	779	22.1	−0.2
Total formal votes		3,532	97.3	+0.7
Informal votes		97	2.7	−0.7
Turnout		3,629	84.0	
Two-party-preferred result
Country Liberal	Michael Jones	2,063	58.4	+0.6
Labor	Sue West	1,469	41.6	−0.6
Two-candidate-preferred result
Independent	Loraine Braham	1,797	50.9	−4.6
Country Liberal	Michael Jones	1,735	49.1	+4.6
Independent hold		Swing	−4.6	

=== Brennan ===
2005 Northern Territory general election: Brennan
Party	Candidate	Votes	%	±%
Labor	James Burke	1,656	44.7	+21.6
Country Liberal	Denis Burke	1,638	44.2	−19.6
Independent	Nelly Riley	413	11.1	+11.1
Total formal votes		3,707	96.8	+0.8
Informal votes		121	3.2	−0.8
Turnout		3,828	84.4	
Two-party-preferred result
Labor	James Burke	1,922	51.8	+20.8
Country Liberal	Denis Burke	1,785	48.2	−20.8
Labor gain from Country Liberal		Swing	+20.8	

=== Casuarina ===
2005 Northern Territory general election: Casuarina
Party	Candidate	Votes	%	±%
Labor	Kon Vatskalis	2,361	66.1	+17.5
Country Liberal	Wendy Green	992	27.8	−14.8
Independent	Gary Mills	126	3.5	+3.5
Independent	Scott White	94	2.6	+2.6
Total formal votes		3,573	97.4	+0.5
Informal votes		95	2.6	−0.5
Turnout		3,668	86.6	
Two-party-preferred result
Labor	Kon Vatskalis	2,466	69.0	+15.5
Country Liberal	Wendy Green	1,107	31.0	−15.5
Labor hold		Swing	+15.5	

=== Daly ===
2005 Northern Territory general election: Daly
Party	Candidate	Votes	%	±%
Labor	Rob Knight	1,842	53.1	+18.6
Country Liberal	Debbi Aloisi	980	28.2	−26.7
Independent	Dale Seaniger	489	14.1	+14.1
Greens	Elke Stegemann	159	4.6	+4.6
Total formal votes		3,470	95.0	+1.8
Informal votes		181	5.0	−1.8
Turnout		3,651	77.6	
Two-party-preferred result
Labor	Rob Knight	2,249	64.8	+24.3
Country Liberal	Debbi Aloisi	1,221	35.2	−24.3
Labor gain from Country Liberal		Swing	+24.3	

=== Drysdale ===
2005 Northern Territory general election: Drysdale
Party	Candidate	Votes	%	±%
Labor	Chris Natt	1,829	51.3	+17.4
Country Liberal	Stephen Dunham	1,739	48.7	−16.6
Total formal votes		3,568	95.3	+0.9
Informal votes		177	4.7	−0.9
Turnout		3,745	82.1	
Labor gain from Country Liberal		Swing	+17.0	

=== Fannie Bay ===
2005 Northern Territory general election: Fannie Bay
Party	Candidate	Votes	%	±%
Labor	Clare Martin	2,551	65.8	+8.9
Country Liberal	Edward Fry	1,131	29.2	−8.8
Independent	Fiona Clarke	196	5.1	+5.1
Total formal votes		3,878	97.1	+0.2
Informal votes		115	2.9	−0.2
Turnout		3,993	85.0	
Two-party-preferred result
Labor	Clare Martin	2,661	68.6	+8.8
Country Liberal	Edward Fry	1,217	31.4	−8.8
Labor hold		Swing	+8.8	

=== Goyder ===
2005 Northern Territory general election: Goyder
Party	Candidate	Votes	%	±%
Labor	Ted Warren	1,376	35.7	+11.1
Country Liberal	Keith Phasey	1,359	35.3	−21.4
Independent	Mary Walshe	534	13.9	+13.9
Independent	Andrew Blackadder	339	8.8	+8.8
Greens	Diana Rickard	246	6.4	+6.4
Total formal votes		3,854	96.7	+0.3
Informal votes		133	3.3	−0.3
Turnout		3,987	88.8	
Two-party-preferred result
Labor	Ted Warren	1,989	51.6	+16.4
Country Liberal	Keith Phasey	1,865	48.4	−16.4
Labor gain from Country Liberal		Swing	+16.4	

=== Greatorex ===
2005 Northern Territory general election: Greatorex
Party	Candidate	Votes	%	±%
Country Liberal	Richard Lim	1,848	48.5	−2.7
Labor	Fran Kilgariff	1,556	40.8	+6.5
Greens	David Mortimer	407	10.7	+10.7
Total formal votes		3,811	97.5	+0.4
Informal votes		97	2.5	−0.4
Turnout		3,908	86.3	
Two-party-preferred result
Country Liberal	Richard Lim	1,958	51.4	−7.6
Labor	Fran Kilgariff	1,853	48.6	+7.6
Country Liberal hold		Swing	−7.6	

=== Johnston ===
2005 Northern Territory general election: Johnston
Party	Candidate	Votes	%	±%
Labor	Chris Burns	1,977	55.0	+8.8
Country Liberal	Ross Connolly	1,071	29.8	−14.1
Greens	Kate Neely	358	10.0	+10.0
Independent	Steve Saint	148	4.1	+4.1
Independent	Gary Meyerhoff	38	1.1	+1.1
Total formal votes		3,592	96.9	0.0
Informal votes		114	3.1	0.0
Turnout		3,706	86.9	
Two-party-preferred result
Labor	Chris Burns	2,355	65.6	+12.7
Country Liberal	Ross Connolly	1,237	34.4	−12.7
Labor hold		Swing	+12.7	

=== Karama ===
2005 Northern Territory general election: Karama
Party	Candidate	Votes	%	±%
Labor	Delia Lawrie	2,445	67.0	+13.3
Country Liberal	Trevor Sellick	1,205	33.0	−13.3
Total formal votes		3,650	94.9	−1.0
Informal votes		198	5.1	+1.0
Turnout		3,848	89.1	
Labor hold		Swing	+13.3	

=== Katherine ===
2005 Northern Territory general election: Katherine
Party	Candidate	Votes	%	±%
Country Liberal	Fay Miller	1,930	52.6	−1.3
Labor	Sharon Hillen	1,736	47.4	+21.7
Total formal votes		3,666	96.5	−0.3
Informal votes		133	3.5	+0.3
Turnout		3,799	81.8	
Country Liberal hold		Swing	−12.7	

=== Macdonell ===
2005 Northern Territory general election: Macdonnell
Party	Candidate	Votes	%	±%
Labor	Alison Anderson	1,445	51.7	+10.2
Country Liberal	John Elferink	866	31.0	−27.5
Greens	Andrew Longmire	277	9.9	+9.9
Independent	Vincent Forrester	129	4.6	+4.6
Independent	David Chewings	77	2.8	+2.8
Total formal votes		2,794	92.2	−2.0
Informal votes		235	7.8	+2.0
Turnout		3,029	67.7	
Two-party-preferred result
Labor	Alison Anderson	1,727	61.8	+20.3
Country Liberal	John Elferink	1,067	38.2	−20.3
Labor gain from Country Liberal		Swing	+20.3	

=== Millner ===
2005 Northern Territory general election: Millner
Party	Candidate	Votes	%	±%
Labor	Matthew Bonson	1,888	52.7	+8.5
Independent	Phil Mitchell	758	21.2	+21.2
Country Liberal	Paul Mossman	598	16.7	−29.3
Greens	Rob Hoad	293	8.2	+8.2
Independent	Rob Inder-Smith	45	1.3	+1.3
Total formal votes		3,582	97.2	+2.6
Informal votes		102	2.8	−2.6
Turnout		3,684	83.1	
Two-party-preferred result
Labor	Matthew Bonson	2,429	67.8	+16.7
Country Liberal	Paul Mossman	1,153	32.2	−16.7
Two-candidate-preferred result
Labor	Matthew Bonson	2,250	62.8	+11.6
Independent	Phil Mitchell	1,332	37.2	+37.2
Labor hold		Swing	N/A	

=== Nelson ===
2005 Northern Territory general election: Nelson
Party	Candidate	Votes	%	±%
Independent	Gerry Wood	2,133	56.6	+23.4
Country Liberal	Chris Lugg	1,163	30.8	−16.5
Labor	Lisa McKinney-Smith	475	12.6	−1.0
Total formal votes		3,771	97.7	+0.7
Informal votes		89	2.3	−0.7
Turnout		3,860	83.4	
Two-party-preferred result
Country Liberal	Chris Lugg	2,253	59.7	−6.0
Labor	Lisa McKinney-Smith	1,518	40.3	+6.0
Two-candidate-preferred result
Independent	Gerry Wood	2,496	66.2	+15.1
Country Liberal	Chris Lugg	1,275	33.8	−15.1
Independent hold		Swing	+15.1	

=== Nhulunbuy ===
2005 Northern Territory general election: Nhulunbuy
Party	Candidate	Votes	%	±%
Labor	Syd Stirling	2,188	76.1	+21.1
Country Liberal	Peter Manning	689	23.9	−1.8
Total formal votes		2,877	95.9	+1.3
Informal votes		122	4.1	−1.3
Turnout		2,999	65.1	
Labor hold		Swing	+10.0	

=== Nightcliff ===
2005 Northern Territory general election: Nightcliff
Party	Candidate	Votes	%	±%
Labor	Jane Aagaard	1,815	49.8	−2.1
Country Liberal	Anthony Reiter	1,063	29.2	−11.4
Greens	Ilana Eldridge	571	15.7	+15.7
Independent	Andrew Arthur	134	3.7	+3.7
Independent	Stuart Highway	61	1.7	+1.7
Total formal votes		3,644	97.5	+0.7
Informal votes		92	2.5	−0.7
Turnout		3,736	84.2	
Two-party-preferred result
Labor	Jane Aagaard	2,385	65.5	+8.4
Country Liberal	Anthony Reiter	1,259	34.5	−8.4
Labor hold		Swing	+8.4	

=== Port Darwin ===
2005 Northern Territory general election: Port Darwin
Party	Candidate	Votes	%	±%
Labor	Kerry Sacilotto	1,734	51.1	+15.6
Country Liberal	Sue Carter	1,661	48.9	+1.7
Total formal votes		3,395	95.7	−1.2
Informal votes		152	4.3	+1.2
Turnout		3,547	78.2	
Labor gain from Country Liberal		Swing	+8.4	

=== Sanderson ===
2005 Northern Territory general election: Sanderson
Party	Candidate	Votes	%	±%
Labor	Len Kiely	2,204	58.4	+14.4
Country Liberal	Peter Styles	1,569	41.6	+0.2
Total formal votes		3,773	96.2	+0.1
Informal votes		150	3.8	−0.1
Turnout		3,923	89.4	
Labor hold		Swing	+5.4	

=== Stuart ===
2005 Northern Territory general election: Stuart
Party	Candidate	Votes	%	±%
Labor	Peter Toyne	1,717	71.0	+4.3
Country Liberal	Anna Machado	702	29.0	−1.9
Total formal votes		2,419	95.4	−0.2
Informal votes		116	4.6	+0.2
Turnout		2,535	59.3	
Labor hold		Swing	+3.2	

=== Wanguri ===
2005 Northern Territory general election: Wanguri
Party	Candidate	Votes	%	±%
Labor	Paul Henderson	2,583	70.8	+15.5
Country Liberal	Kerrie Kyriacou	1,065	29.2	−12.2
Total formal votes		3,648	96.7	−3.3
Informal votes		126	3.3	+3.3
Turnout		3,774	87.7	
Labor hold		Swing	+13.6	

== See also ==
- 2005 Northern Territory general election
