= Results of the 2008 Northern Territory general election =

Northern Territory general election, 9 August 2008 Legislative Assembly << 2005–2012 >>
Enrolled voters	110,289				
Votes cast	83,436		Turnout	75.65%	–5.70%
Informal votes	3,407		Informal	4.08%	+0.34%
Summary of votes by party
Party	Primary votes	%	Swing	Seats	Change
Labor	34,557	43.18%	–8.76%	13	– 6
Country Liberal	36,334	45.40%	+9.67%	11	+ 7
Independent	5,696	7.12%	–0.32%	1	– 1
Greens	3,442	4.30%	+0.13%	0	± 0
Total	80,029			25	
Two-party-preferred
Labor	39,415	49.3%	–9.2%		
Country Liberal	40,614	50.7%	+9.2%		

This is a list of electoral division results for the Northern Territory 2008 General Election.

== Results by Electoral Division ==
=== Arafura ===
2008 Northern Territory general election: Arafura
Party	Candidate	Votes	%	±%
Labor	Marion Scrymgour	1,300	46.1	−18.0
Country Liberal	Tristan Mungatopi	544	19.3	−3.0
Independent	Jone Lotu	487	17.3	N/A
Country Liberal	Angie Siebert	486	17.3	N/A
Total formal votes		2,817	94.0	−1.1
Informal votes		179	6.0	+1.1
Turnout		2,996	60.8	−5.4
Two-party-preferred result
Labor	Marion Scrymgour	1,802	64.0	−9.6
Country Liberal	Tristan Mungatopi	1,015	36.0	+9.6
Labor hold		Swing	−9.6	

=== Araluen ===
2008 Northern Territory general election: Araluen
Party	Candidate	Votes	%	±%
Country Liberal	Jodeen Carney	2,470	68.3	+14.4
Labor	John Gaynor	618	17.1	−19.4
Greens	Linda Chellew	526	14.6	+5.4
Total formal votes		3,614	97.6	+0.6
Informal votes		90	2.4	−0.6
Turnout		3,704	74.6	−7.5
Two-party-preferred result
Country Liberal	Jodeen Carney	2,699	74.7	+17.2
Labor	John Gaynor	915	25.3	−17.2
Country Liberal hold		Swing	+17.2	

=== Arnhem ===
The 2008 election in Arnhem was uncontested with one candidate nominating.

2008 Northern Territory general election: Arnhem
Party	Candidate	Votes	%	±%
Labor	Malarndirri McCarthy	0	N/A	N/A
Total formal votes		0	N/A	N/A
Informal votes		0	N/A	N/A
Turnout		0	N/A	N/A
Labor hold		Swing	N/A	

=== Barkly ===
2008 Northern Territory general election: Barkly
Party	Candidate	Votes	%	±%
Labor	Gerry McCarthy	1,777	60.9	−10.9
Country Liberal	Mick Adams	801	27.5	+3.2
Independent	Randall Gould	265	9.1	+9.1
Independent	Barry Nattrass	73	2.5	+2.5
Total formal votes		2,916	95.3	−0.8
Informal votes		144	4.7	+0.8
Turnout		3,060	65.1	
Two-party-preferred result
Labor	Gerry McCarthy	1,914	65.6	−8.6
Country Liberal	Mick Adams	1,002	34.4	+8.6
Labor hold		Swing	−8.6	

=== Blain ===
2008 Northern Territory general election: Blain
Party	Candidate	Votes	%	±%
Country Liberal	Terry Mills	2,258	61.6	+5.8
Labor	Ken Vowles	1,410	38.4	−5.8
Total formal votes		3,668	94.9	−1.4
Informal votes		198	5.1	+1.4
Turnout		3,866	80.1	
Country Liberal hold		Swing	+5.8	

=== Braitling ===
2008 Northern Territory general election: Braitling
Party	Candidate	Votes	%	±%
Country Liberal	Adam Giles	2,052	58.2	+12.8
Greens	Jane Clark	526	14.9	+14.9
Independent	Eli Melky	496	14.1	+14.1
Labor	Aaron Dick	449	12.7	−10.0
Total formal votes		3,523	97.2	−0.1
Informal votes		103	2.8	+0.1
Turnout		3,626	73.3	
Two-party-preferred result
Country Liberal	Adam Giles	2,588	73.5	+15.4
Labor	Aaron Dick	935	26.5	−15.4
Two-candidate-preferred result
Country Liberal	Adam Giles	2,475	70.3	+12.2
Greens	Jane Clark	1,048	29.7	+29.7
Country Liberal gain from Independent		Swing	+12.2	

=== Brennan ===
2008 Northern Territory general election: Brennan
Party	Candidate	Votes	%	±%
Country Liberal	Peter Chandler	2,009	52.6	+3.3
Labor	James Burke	1,807	47.4	−3.3
Total formal votes		3,816	95.7	+1.0
Informal votes		170	4.3	−1.0
Turnout		3,986	80.3	
Country Liberal gain from Labor		Swing	+3.3	

=== Casuarina ===
2008 Northern Territory general election: Casuarina
Party	Candidate	Votes	%	±%
Labor	Kon Vatskalis	2,397	64.2	−4.2
Country Liberal	Gary Haslett	1,339	35.8	+4.2
Total formal votes		3,736	94.9	−2.4
Informal votes		199	5.1	+2.4
Turnout		3,935	84.1	
Labor hold		Swing	−4.2	

=== Daly ===
2008 Northern Territory general election: Daly
Party	Candidate	Votes	%	±%
Labor	Rob Knight	1,541	46.9	−6.5
Country Liberal	Wayne Connop	1,212	36.9	+10.5
Greens	David Pollock	292	8.9	+3.9
Independent	August Stevens	240	7.3	+7.3
Total formal votes		3,285	95.3	
Informal votes		162	4.7	
Turnout		3,447	73.9	
Two-party-preferred result
Labor	Rob Knight	1,827	55.6	−10.2
Country Liberal	Wayne Connop	1,458	44.4	+10.2
Labor hold		Swing	−10.2	

=== Drysdale ===
2008 Northern Territory general election: Drysdale
Party	Candidate	Votes	%	±%
Country Liberal	Ross Bohlin	2,020	55.3	+6.3
Labor	Chris Natt	1,262	34.5	−12.8
Independent	Justin Tutty	374	10.2	+10.2
Total formal votes		3,656	96.4	+0.5
Informal votes		135	3.6	−0.5
Turnout		3,791	79.9	
Two-party-preferred result
Country Liberal	Ross Bohlin	2,199	60.1	+9.7
Labor	Chris Natt	1,457	39.9	−9.7
Country Liberal gain from Labor		Swing	+9.7	

=== Fannie Bay ===
2008 Northern Territory general election: Fannie Bay
Party	Candidate	Votes	%	±%
Labor	Michael Gunner	1,878	51.1	−14.6
Country Liberal	Garry Lambert	1,800	48.9	+14.6
Total formal votes		3,678	94.8	−2.1
Informal votes		203	5.2	+2.1
Turnout		3,881	78.5	
Labor hold		Swing	−14.6	

=== Fong Lim ===
2008 Northern Territory general election: Fong Lim
Party	Candidate	Votes	%	±%
Country Liberal	Dave Tollner	1,831	52.1	+13.6
Labor	Matthew Bonson	1,685	47.9	−13.6
Total formal votes		3,516	94.8	−1.7
Informal votes		191	5.2	+1.7
Turnout		3,707	75.9	
Country Liberal gain from Labor		Swing	+13.6	

=== Goyder ===
2008 Northern Territory general election: Goyder
Party	Candidate	Votes	%	±%
Country Liberal	Kezia Purick	2,183	58.4	+7.9
Labor	Ted Warren	1,556	41.6	−7.9
Total formal votes		3,739	95.7	−1.0
Informal votes		169	4.3	+1.0
Turnout		3,908	83.2	
Country Liberal gain from Labor		Swing	+7.9	

=== Greatorex ===
2008 Northern Territory general election: Greatorex
Party	Candidate	Votes	%	±%
Country Liberal	Matt Conlan	2,205	61.2	+13.6
Labor	Jo Nixon	735	20.4	−21.7
Greens	Lenny Aronsten	664	18.4	+8.1
Total formal votes		3,604	97.6	+0.1
Informal votes		89	2.4	−0.1
Turnout		3,693	76.6	
Two-party-preferred result
Country Liberal	Matt Conlan	2,396	66.5	+16.1
Labor	Jo Nixon	1,208	33.5	−16.1
Country Liberal hold		Swing	+16.1	

=== Johnston ===
2008 Northern Territory general election: Johnston
Party	Candidate	Votes	%	±%
Labor	Chris Burns	2,246	58.1	−8.7
Country Liberal	Jo Sangster	1,618	41.9	+8.7
Total formal votes		3,864	95.0	−2.3
Informal votes		205	5.0	+2.3
Turnout		4,069	82.5	
Labor hold		Swing	−8.7	

=== Karama ===
2008 Northern Territory general election: Karama
Party	Candidate	Votes	%	±%
Labor	Delia Lawrie	2,234	56.1	−9.5
Country Liberal	Tony Bacus	1,398	35.1	+1.5
Independent	Natalie Hunter	192	4.8	+4.8
Independent	Dorothy Fox	156	3.9	+3.9
Total formal votes		3,980	96.0	+1.0
Informal votes		167	4.0	−1.0
Turnout		4,147	84.0	
Two-party-preferred result
Labor	Delia Lawrie	2,420	60.8	−5.2
Country Liberal	Tony Bacus	1,560	39.2	+5.2
Labor hold		Swing	−5.2	

=== Katherine ===
2008 Northern Territory general election: Katherine
Party	Candidate	Votes	%	±%
Country Liberal	Willem Westra van Holthe	1,836	50.9	−1.7
Labor	Sharon Hillen	1,131	31.4	−15.8
Independent	Toni Tapp Coutts	638	17.7	+17.7
Total formal votes		3,605	96.6	+0.2
Informal votes		126	3.4	−0.2
Turnout		3,731	75.8	
Two-party-preferred result
Country Liberal	Willem Westra van Holthe	2,106	58.4	+5.7
Labor	Sharon Hillen	1,499	41.6	−5.7
Country Liberal hold		Swing	+5.7	

=== Macdonnell ===
The 2008 election in Macdonnell was uncontested with one candidate nominating.

2008 Northern Territory general election: Macdonnell
Party	Candidate	Votes	%	±%
Labor	Alison Anderson	Unopposed		
Labor hold		Swing		

=== Nelson ===
2008 Northern Territory general election: Nelson
Party	Candidate	Votes	%	±%
Independent	Gerry Wood	2,436	72.2	+15.0
Country Liberal	Maureen Kohlman	646	19.1	−11.5
Labor	Justine Luders-Searle	292	8.7	−3.5
Total formal votes		3,374	97.6	−0.2
Informal votes		82	2.4	+0.2
Turnout		3,456	74.6	
Two-party-preferred result
Country Liberal	Maureen Kohlman	2,313	68.6	+8.7
Labor	Justine Luders-Searle	1,061	31.4	−8.7
Two-candidate-preferred result
Independent	Gerry Wood	2,654	78.7	+12.1
Country Liberal	Maureen Kohlman	720	21.3	−12.1
Independent hold		Swing	+12.1	

=== Nhulunbuy ===
2008 Northern Territory general election: Nhulunbuy
Party	Candidate	Votes	%	±%
Labor	Lynne Walker	1,936	74.2	−1.3
Country Liberal	Djuwalpi Marika	674	25.8	+1.3
Total formal votes		2,610	96.2	+0.3
Informal votes		103	3.8	−0.3
Turnout		2,713	59.9	
Labor hold		Swing	−1.3	

=== Nightcliff ===
Northern Territory General Election, 2008: Nightcliff
Party	Candidate	Votes	%	±%
Labor	Jane Aagaard	1,625	43.01	−6.80
Country Liberal	Peter Manning	1,257	33.27	+4.10
Greens	Emma Young	896	23.72	+8.05
Total formal votes		3,778	96.95	−0.59
Informal votes		119	3.05	+0.59
Turnout		3,897	78.79	−5.43
Two-party-preferred result
Labor	Jane Aagaard	2,293	60.69	−4.73
Country Liberal	Peter Manning	1,485	39.31	+4.73
Labor hold		Swing	−4.73	

=== Port Darwin ===
2008 Northern Territory general election: Port Darwin
Party	Candidate	Votes	%	±%
Country Liberal	John Elferink	1,557	46.8	−0.9
Labor	Kerry Sacilotto	1,231	37.0	−14.6
Greens	Gary Abbott	538	16.2	+16.2
Total formal votes		3,326	96.9	+1.1
Informal votes		105	3.1	−1.1
Turnout		3,431	72.4	
Two-party-preferred result
Country Liberal	John Elferink	1,757	52.8	+4.8
Labor	Kerry Sacilotto	1,569	47.2	−4.8
Country Liberal gain from Labor		Swing	+4.8	

=== Sanderson ===
2008 Northern Territory general election: Sanderson
Party	Candidate	Votes	%	±%
Country Liberal	Peter Styles	2,231	56.4	+16.4
Labor	Len Kiely	1,723	43.6	−16.4
Total formal votes		3,954	94.1	−2.2
Informal votes		247	5.9	+2.2
Turnout		4,201	86.6	
Country Liberal gain from Labor		Swing	+16.4	

=== Stuart ===
2008 Northern Territory general election: Stuart
Party	Candidate	Votes	%	±%
Labor	Karl Hampton	1,470	65.1	−3.9
Country Liberal	Rex Japanangka	789	34.9	+3.9
Total formal votes		2,259	95.5	+0.3
Informal votes		106	4.5	−0.3
Turnout		2,365	52.8	
Labor hold		Swing	−3.9	

=== Wanguri ===
2008 Northern Territory general election: Wanguri
Party	Candidate	Votes	%	±%
Labor	Paul Henderson	2,254	60.7	−10.0
Country Liberal	Kerry Kyriacou	1,118	30.1	+0.9
Independent	Duncan Dean	339	9.1	+9.1
Total formal votes		3,711	97.0	+0.3
Informal votes		115	3.0	−0.3
Turnout		3,826	83.9	
Two-party-preferred result
Labor	Paul Henderson	2,407	64.9	−5.9
Country Liberal	Kerry Kyriacou	1,304	35.1	+5.9
Labor hold		Swing	−5.9	

== See also ==
- 2008 Northern Territory general election
