= Electoral results for the division of Goyder =

This is a list of electoral results for the Electoral division of Goyder in Northern Territory elections.

== Members for Goyder ==
Member	Party	Term
Terry McCarthy	Country Liberal	1990–2001
Peter Maley	Country Liberal	2001–2005
Peter Maley	Independent	2005
Ted Warren	Labor	2005–2008
Kezia Purick	Country Liberal	2008–2015
Kezia Purick	Independent	2015–present

== Election results ==
=== Elections in the 1990s ===
1990 Northern Territory general election: Goyder
Party	Candidate	Votes	%	±%
Country Liberal	Terry McCarthy	1,069	42.7	N/A
Labor	Jack Ah Kit	568	22.7	N/A
Independent	Kezia Purick	330	13.2	N/A
NT Nationals	Ian Tuxworth	238	9.5	N/A
Independent	Thomas Starr	185	7.4	N/A
Greens	Louise Size	116	4.6	N/A
Total formal votes		2,506	96.7	N/A
Informal votes		86	3.3	N/A
Turnout		2,592	83.3	N/A
Two-party-preferred result
Country Liberal	Terry McCarthy	1,644	65.6	N/A
Labor	Jack Ah Kit	862	34.4	N/A
Two-candidate-preferred result
Country Liberal	Terry McCarthy	1,355	54.1	N/A
Independent	Kezia Purick	1,151	45.9	N/A
Country Liberal hold		Swing	N/A	

1994 Northern Territory general election: Goyder
Party	Candidate	Votes	%	±%
Country Liberal	Terry McCarthy	1,781	53.7	+11.0
Labor	Jamie Johnson	1,040	31.4	+8.7
Independent	Gerry Wood	495	14.9	+14.9
Total formal votes		3,316	97.6	+0.9
Informal votes		80	2.4	−0.9
Turnout		3,396	82.4	−0.9
Two-party-preferred result
Country Liberal	Terry McCarthy	2,181	65.8	+0.2
Labor	Jamie Johnson	1,135	34.2	−0.2
Country Liberal hold		Swing	+0.2	

1997 Northern Territory general election: Goyder
Party	Candidate	Votes	%	±%
Country Liberal	Terry McCarthy	1,845	59.4	+5.7
Labor	Wayne Connop	1,070	34.4	+3.0
Independent	Strider	191	6.1	+6.1
Total formal votes		3,106	95.9	−1.7
Informal votes		134	4.1	+1.7
Turnout		3,240	83.0	+0.6
Two-party-preferred result
Country Liberal	Terry McCarthy	1,915	61.7	+1.0
Labor	Wayne Connop	1,191	38.3	−1.0
Country Liberal hold		Swing	+1.0	

=== Elections in the 2000s ===
2001 Northern Territory general election: Goyder
Party	Candidate	Votes	%	±%
Country Liberal	Peter Maley	2,092	57.7	−3.9
Labor	Alan Smith	986	27.2	−5.7
One Nation	Merv Stewart	273	7.5	+7.5
Independent	Diana Rickard	272	7.5	+7.5
Total formal votes		3,623	96.7	+1.0
Informal votes		122	3.3	−1.0
Turnout		3,745	85.9	
Two-party-preferred result
Country Liberal	Peter Maley	2,313	63.8	+0.1
Labor	Alan Smith	1,310	36.2	−0.1
Country Liberal hold		Swing	+0.1	

2005 Northern Territory general election: Goyder
Party	Candidate	Votes	%	±%
Labor	Ted Warren	1,376	35.7	+11.1
Country Liberal	Keith Phasey	1,359	35.3	−21.4
Independent	Mary Walshe	534	13.9	+13.9
Independent	Andrew Blackadder	339	8.8	+8.8
Greens	Diana Rickard	246	6.4	+6.4
Total formal votes		3,854	96.7	+0.3
Informal votes		133	3.3	−0.3
Turnout		3,987	88.8	
Two-party-preferred result
Labor	Ted Warren	1,989	51.6	+16.4
Country Liberal	Keith Phasey	1,865	48.4	−16.4
Labor gain from Country Liberal		Swing	+16.4	

2008 Northern Territory general election: Goyder
Party	Candidate	Votes	%	±%
Country Liberal	Kezia Purick	2,183	58.4	+7.9
Labor	Ted Warren	1,556	41.6	−7.9
Total formal votes		3,739	95.7	−1.0
Informal votes		169	4.3	+1.0
Turnout		3,908	83.2	
Country Liberal gain from Labor		Swing	+7.9	

=== Elections in the 2010s ===
2012 Northern Territory general election: Goyder
Party	Candidate	Votes	%	±%
Country Liberal	Kezia Purick	2,731	62.2	+3.8
Labor	Damian Smith	1,291	29.4	−12.2
One Nation	John Kearney	368	8.4	+8.4
Total formal votes		4,391	96.9	+1.2
Informal votes		142	3.1	−1.2
Turnout		4,533	85.2	+2.0
Two-party-preferred result
Country Liberal	Kezia Purick	2,929	66.7	+8.3
Labor	Damian Smith	1,462	33.3	−8.3
Country Liberal hold		Swing	+8.3	

2016 Northern Territory general election: Goyder
Party	Candidate	Votes	%	±%
Independent	Kezia Purick	2,496	55.0	+55.0
Country Liberal	Carolyn Reynolds	919	20.2	−41.4
Labor	Mick Taylor	860	18.9	−11.0
Greens	Billee McGinley	188	4.1	+3.7
Citizens Electoral Council	Peter Flynn	76	1.7	+1.7
Total formal votes		4,539	98.3	+1.5
Informal votes		78	1.7	−1.5
Turnout		4,617	82.6	−3.4
Two-party-preferred result
Labor	Mick Taylor	1,679	52.0	+18.0
Country Liberal	Carolyn Reynolds	1,551	48.0	−18.0
Two-candidate-preferred result
Independent	Kezia Purick	3,109	75.3	+75.3
Country Liberal	Carolyn Reynolds	1,020	24.7	−41.3
Independent gain from Country Liberal		Swing	N/A	

=== Elections in the 2020s ===
2020 Northern Territory general election: Goyder
Party	Candidate	Votes	%	±%
Independent	Kezia Purick	1,459	31.1	−23.9
Country Liberal	Phil Battye	1,289	27.5	+7.2
Territory Alliance	Rachael Wright	614	13.1	+13.1
Labor	Mick Taylor	590	12.6	−6.4
Independent	Pauline Cass	283	6.0	+6.0
Independent	Ted Warren	249	5.3	+5.3
Greens	Karen Fletcher	147	3.1	−1.0
Independent	Trevor Jenkins	64	1.4	+1.4
Total formal votes		4,695	96.1	N/A
Informal votes		189	3.9	N/A
Turnout		4,884	87.5	N/A
Two-party-preferred result (Note: Estimated two-party count by Antony Green.)
Country Liberal	Phil Battye	3,024	64.4	+16.4
Labor	Mick Taylor	1,671	35.6	−16.4
Two-candidate-preferred result
Independent	Kezia Purick	2,665	56.8	−18.5
Country Liberal	Phil Battye	2,030	43.2	+18.5
Independent hold		Swing	−18.5	

2024 Northern Territory general election: Goyder
Party	Candidate	Votes	%	±%
Country Liberal	Andrew Mackay	2,846	56.2	+28.8
Independent	Belinda Kolstad	1,049	20.7	+20.7
Labor	Sandy Griffin	691	13.7	+1.1
Independent	Mathew Salter	367	7.2	+7.2
Independent	Trevor Jenkins	109	2.2	+0.8
Total formal votes		5,062	96.7	+0.5
Informal votes		175	3.3	−0.6
Turnout		5,237	83.0	
Two-party-preferred result (Note: Estimated two-party-preferred count by Antony Green.)
Country Liberal	Andrew Mackay	3,819	75.4	+11.0
Labor	Sandy Griffin	1,245	24.6	−11.0
Two-candidate-preferred result
Country Liberal	Andrew Mackay	3,172	62.7	+19.4
Independent	Belinda Kolstad	1,890	37.3	+37.3
Country Liberal gain from Independent		Swing	+19.4	
