= Members of the Northern Territory Legislative Assembly, 2005–2008 =

This is a list of members of the Northern Territory Legislative Assembly from 2005 to 2008:

Name	Party	Electorate	Term in office
Hon Jane Aagaard	Labor	Nightcliff	2001–2012
Alison Anderson	Labor	MacDonnell	2005–2016
Matthew Bonson	Labor	Millner	2001–2008
Hon Loraine Braham	Independent	Braitling	1994–2008
James Burke	Labor	Brennan	2005–2008
Dr Chris Burns	Labor	Johnston	2001–2012
Jodeen Carney	CLP	Araluen	2001–2010
Matt Conlan ^{[2]}	CLP	Greatorex	2007–2016
Karl Hampton ^{[1]}	Labor	Stuart	2006–2012
Hon Paul Henderson	Labor	Wanguri	1999–2013
Len Kiely	Labor	Sanderson	2001–2008
Rob Knight	Labor	Daly	2005–2012
Hon Delia Lawrie	Labor	Karama	2001–2016
Dr Richard Lim ^{[2]}	CLP	Greatorex	1994–2007
Hon Clare Martin	Labor	Fannie Bay	1995–2008
Hon Elliot McAdam	Labor	Barkly	2001–2008
Malarndirri McCarthy ^{[3]}	Labor	Arnhem	2005–2012
Fay Miller	CLP	Katherine	2003–2008
Terry Mills	CLP	Blain	1999–2014, 2016–2020
Chris Natt	Labor	Drysdale	2005–2008
Kerry Sacilotto	Labor	Port Darwin	2005–2008
Marion Scrymgour	Labor	Arafura	2001–2012
Hon Syd Stirling	Labor	Nhulunbuy	1990–2008
Hon Dr Peter Toyne ^{[1]}	Labor	Stuart	1996–2006
Hon Kon Vatskalis	Labor	Casuarina	2001–2014
Gerry Wood	Independent	Nelson	2001–2020
Ted Warren	Labor	Goyder	2005–2008

^{1} Stuart Labor MLA and territory Attorney-General Peter Toyne resigned in late August 2006. Labor candidate Karl Hampton won the resulting by-election on 23 October.
^{2} Greatorex CLP MLA Dr Richard Lim resigned on 9 July 2007. CLP candidate Matt Conlan won the resulting by-election on 28 July.
^{3} The MLA for Arafura was elected under the name of Barbara McCarthy, but legally adopted her traditional name of Malarndirri in September 2007. She henceforth requested to be addressed as Malarndirri McCarthy.

== See also ==
- 2005 Northern Territory general election
