= Members of the Northern Territory Legislative Assembly, 2001–2005 =

This is a list of members of the Northern Territory Legislative Assembly from 2001 to 2005:

Name	Party	Electorate	Years in office
Hon Jane Aagaard	Labor	Nightcliff	2001–2012
Jack Ah Kit	Labor	Arnhem	1995–2005
Tim Baldwin	CLP	Daly	1994–2005
Matthew Bonson	Labor	Millner	2001–2008
Hon Loraine Braham	Independent	Braitling	1994–2008
Denis Burke	CLP	Brennan	1994–2005
Dr Chris Burns	Labor	Johnston	2001–2012
Jodeen Carney	CLP	Araluen	2001–2010
Sue Carter	CLP	Port Darwin	2000–2005
Stephen Dunham	CLP	Drysdale	1997–2005
John Elferink	CLP	MacDonnell	1997–2005, 2008–2016
Hon Paul Henderson	Labor	Wanguri	1999–2013
Len Kiely	Labor	Sanderson	2001–2008
Delia Lawrie	Labor	Karama	2001–2016
Dr Richard Lim	CLP	Greatorex	1994–2007
Peter Maley	CLP/Independent ^{[2]}	Goyder	2001–2005
Hon Clare Martin	Labor	Fannie Bay	1995–2008
Elliot McAdam	Labor	Barkly	2001–2008
Fay Miller ^{[1]}	CLP	Katherine	2003–2008
Terry Mills	CLP	Blain	1999–2014, 2016–2020
Mike Reed ^{[1]}	CLP	Katherine	1987–2003
Marion Scrymgour	Labor	Arafura	2001–2012
Hon Syd Stirling	Labor	Nhulunbuy	1990–2008
Hon Dr Peter Toyne	Labor	Stuart	1996–2006
Hon Kon Vatskalis	Labor	Casuarina	2001–2014
Gerry Wood	Independent	Nelson	2001–2020

^{1} Katherine CLP MLA Mike Reed resigned his seat on 12 September 2003. CLP candidate Fay Miller won the resulting by-election on 4 October.
^{2} Goyder CLP MLA Peter Maley was expelled from the parliamentary wing of the Country Liberal Party on 19 May 2005. He served out the remainder of his term as an independent.

== See also ==
- 2001 Northern Territory general election
