= 2008 Northern Territory general election =

Australian election

- 9 August 2008

All 25 seats of the Northern Territory Legislative Assembly 13 seats needed for a majority
- Turnout: 75.7 (▼4.4 pp)
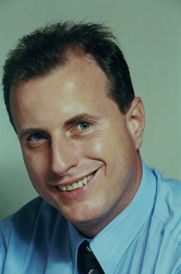

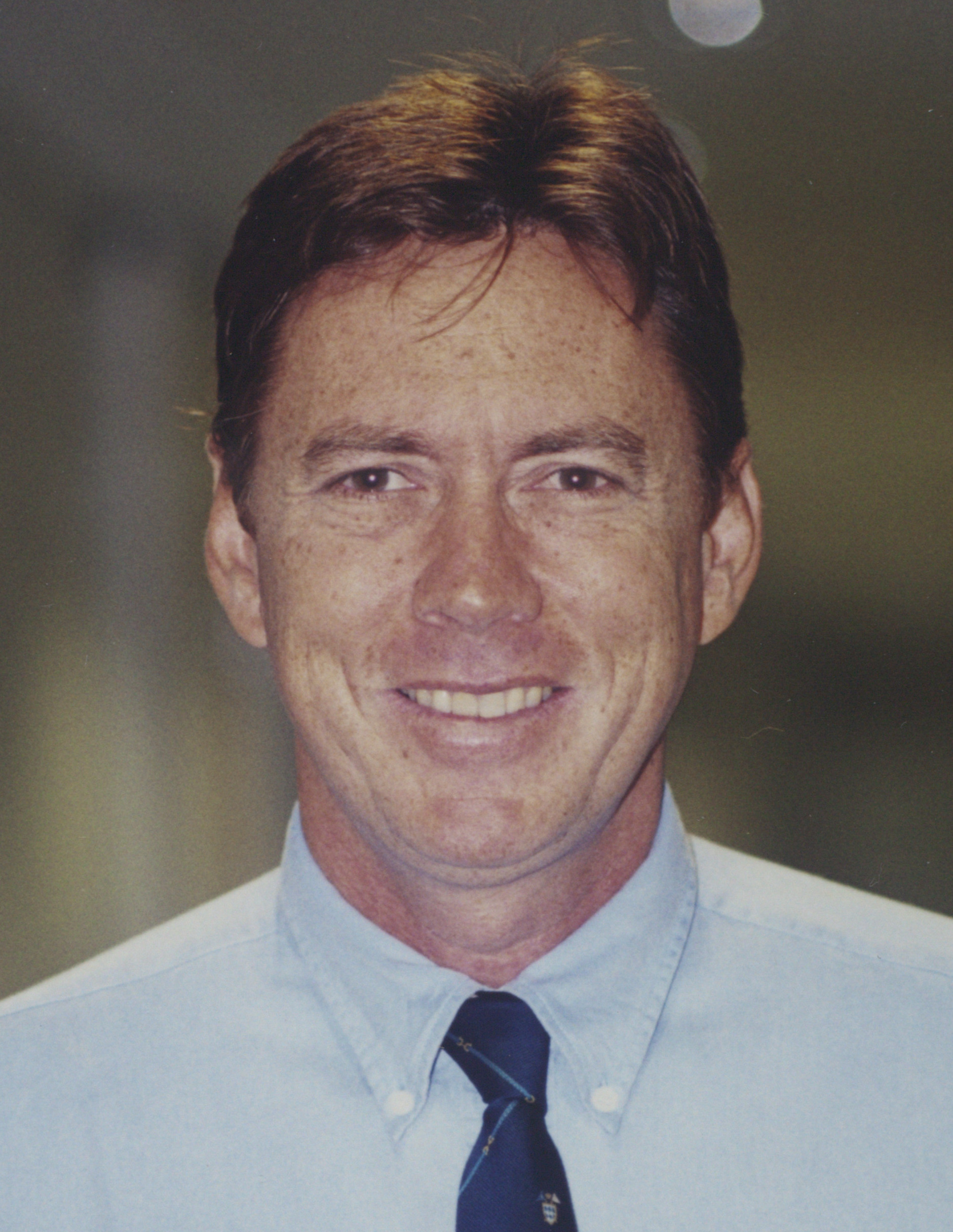
	First party	Second party
Leader	Paul Henderson	Terry Mills
Party	Labor	Country Liberal
Leader since	26 November 2007	29 January 2008
Leader's seat	Wanguri	Blain
Last election	19 seats	4 seats
Seats won	13	11
Seat change	▼6	▲7
Popular vote	34,557	36,334
Percentage	43.18%	45.40%
Swing	▼8.76	▲9.67
TPP	49.3%	50.7%
TPP	▼9.2	▲9.2
Chief Minister before election
Paul Henderson
Labor
Elected Chief Minister
Paul Henderson
Labor

General elections were held in the Northern Territory of Australia on 9 August 2008. Of the 25 seats in the Legislative Assembly, 23 were contested; two safe Labor seats were uncontested. The incumbent centre-left Labor Party (ALP), led by Chief Minister Paul Henderson won a narrow third term victory against the opposition centre-right Country Liberal Party (CLP), led by Terry Mills. Labor suffered a massive and unexpected swing against it, to hold a one-seat majority in the new parliament.

== Results ==
↓
13	1	11
ALP	Ind	CLP

Results of the 2008 Northern Territory general election, Legislative Assembly
Party	Votes	%	+/–	Seats	+/–
Labor	34,557	43.18	▼8.76	13	-6
Country Liberal	36,334	45.40	▲9.67	11	+7
Independents	5,696	7.12	▼1.04	1	-1
Greens	3,442	4.30	▲0.13	0	±0
Total	80,029	100.00	–	25	–
Valid votes	80,029	95.92			
Invalid/blank votes	3,407	4.08	+0.34		
Total votes	83,436	100.00	–		
Registered voters/turnout	110,289	75.65	-5.70		
Labor	39,415	49.25			
Country Liberal	40,614	50.75			
Total	80,029	100.00			

Independents: Gerry Wood

Arnhem and MacDonnell were won by the ALP by default as no other candidates nominated, and therefore do not contribute to votes in the above result table. The Greens ran in six of the 25 seats, averaging around 16 percent. Minister for Natural Resources, Environment and Heritage, Minister for Parks and Wildlife Len Kiely was defeated as was Minister for Sport and Recreation, Corporate and Information Services Matthew Bonson.

Popular vote
Country Liberal	45.4%
Labor	43.2%
Greens	4.3%
Independents	7.1%

Two-party-preferred vote
Country Liberal	50.7%
Labor	49.3%

Seats
Labor	52.0%
Country Liberal	44.0%
Independents	4.00%

== Background ==
The CLP had dominated the Legislative Assembly from its creation in 1974 until 2001, when Clare Martin led Labor to government by one seat. Four years later, Labor was reelected in a landslide that surprised even the most optimistic Labor observers, reducing the CLP to only four seats. Labor even managed to oust Opposition Leader Denis Burke in his own seat. Martin resigned in 2007, shortly after a federal intervention, and was succeeded by Education Minister Paul Henderson.

In January 2008, Opposition Leader Jodeen Carney faced a challenge from her deputy, Terry Mills. Carney rebuffed a proposal to swap posts with Mills (in which she would have become deputy leader under Mills), instead calling a spill. When the vote was tied, Carney declared that a tie vote was not a vote of confidence and resigned, leaving Mills to take the leadership unopposed. Hoping to take advantage of a booming economy and the recent change in opposition leadership, Henderson opted to call an election a year before it was due.

The writs were dropped only days after the gazetting of new electoral boundaries. The Electoral Commission didn't have nearly enough time to notify voters of their new electorates, and a number of Labor MPs swept into office on the back of the 2005 landslide were unable to connect with new constituents on the hustings.

The CLP regained much of what it had lost in its severe beating of three years prior. Notably, it retook two seats in Palmerston that it had lost to Labor in the 2005 landslide. While the CLP won a slim majority of the two-party vote (aided by two Labor incumbents being reelected unopposed), Labor retained all but one seat in northern Darwin, allowing it to win a third term. Labor was only assured of reelection when it won Martin's old seat of Fannie Bay by a narrow 78 votes.

== Key dates ==
- Issue of writ: 22 July
- Close of roll: 8pm 24 July
- Close of nominations: 12 noon 28 July
- Postal voting commences: 31 July
- Pre-poll voting commences: 4 August
- Polling Day: 9 August

== Retiring members ==
The following members did not seek another term at the election.

=== Labor ===
- Clare Martin (Fannie Bay)
- Elliot McAdam (Barkly)
- Syd Stirling (Nhulunbuy)

=== Country Liberal ===
- Fay Miller (Katherine)

=== Independent ===
- Loraine Braham (Braitling)

== Candidates ==
Sitting members are listed in bold. Successful candidates are highlighted in the relevant colour.

Electorate	Held by	Labor	CLP	Greens	Independent
Arafura	Labor	**Marion Scrymgour**	Tristan Mungatopi; Angie Siebert		Jone Lotu
Araluen	CLP	John Gaynor	**Jodeen Carney**	Linda Chellew	
Arnhem	Labor	**Malarndirri McCarthy**			
Barkly	Labor	Gerry McCarthy	Mick Adams		Randall Gould; Barry Nattrass
Blain	CLP	Ken Vowles	**Terry Mills**		
Braitling	Independent	Aaron Dick	Adam Giles	Jane Clark	Eli Melky
Brennan	Labor	**James Burke**	Peter Chandler		
Casuarina	Labor	**Kon Vatskalis**	Gary Haslett		
Daly	Labor	**Rob Knight**	Wayne Connop	David Pollock	August Stevens
Drysdale	CLP	**Chris Natt**	Ross Bohlin		Justin Tutty
Fannie Bay	Labor	Michael Gunner	Garry Lambert		
Fong Lim	Labor	**Matthew Bonson**	Dave Tollner		
Goyder	CLP	**Ted Warren**	Kezia Purick		
Greatorex	CLP	Jo Nixon	**Matt Conlan**	Lenny Aronsten	
Johnston	Labor	**Chris Burns**	Jo Sangster		
Karama	Labor	**Delia Lawrie**	Tony Bacus		Dorothy Fox; Natalie Hunter
Katherine	CLP	Sharon Hillen	Willem Westra van Holthe		Toni Tapp Coutts
Macdonnell	Labor	**Alison Anderson**			
Nelson	Independent	Justine Luders-Searle	Maureen Kohlman		**Gerry Wood**
Nhulunbuy	Labor	Lynne Walker	Djwalpi Marika		
Nightcliff	Labor	**Jane Aagaard**	Peter Manning	Emma Young	
Port Darwin	Labor	**Kerry Sacilotto**	John Elferink	Gary Abbott	
Sanderson	Labor	**Len Kiely**	Peter Styles		
Stuart	Labor	**Karl Hampton**	Rex Granites Japanangka		
Wanguri	Labor	**Paul Henderson**	Kerry Kyriacou		Duncan Dean

== Seats changing hands ==
Seat	Pre-2008			Swing	Post-2008		
Seat	Party	Member	Margin	Swing	Margin	Member	Party
Braitling	Independent	Loraine Braham	0.9	N/A	23.6*	Adam Giles	Country Liberal
Brennan	Labor	James Burke	0.6	3.4	2.7	Peter Chandler	Country Liberal
Drysdale**	Labor	Chris Natt	−0.5	9.6	10.1	Ross Bohlin	Country Liberal
Fong Lim	Labor	notional - new seat	11.5	13.7	2.2	Dave Tollner	Country Liberal
Goyder**	Labor	Ted Warren	-0.5	7.4	7.9	Kezia Purick	Country Liberal
Port Darwin	Labor	Kerry Sacilotto	1.9	5.0	3.0	John Elferink	Country Liberal
Sanderson	Labor	Len Kiely	10.0	17.4	7.4	Peter Styles	Country Liberal

- Members listed in italics did not contest their seat at this election.
- *Braitling's second figure is CLP vs. Labor
- **Due to boundary changes, Drysdale and Goyder were notionally CLP at the time of this election. However, as they were held by members of the ALP at this time, they are still included in this table.

== Electoral pendulum ==
The following pendulum is known as the Mackerras pendulum, invented by psephologist Malcolm Mackerras. The pendulum works by lining up all of the seats held in the Legislative Assembly according to the percentage point margin they are held by on a two-party-preferred basis. This is also known as the swing required for the seat to change hands. Given a uniform swing to the opposition or government parties, the number of seats that change hands can be predicted.

=== Pre-election pendulum ===
Incumbent members who have become and remained an independent since the 2012 election are indicated in grey.

Members listed in italics did not re-contest their seat at the election.

Labor seats
Marginal
Brennan	James Burke	ALP	0.6
Port Darwin	Kerry Sacilotto	ALP	1.9
Fairly safe
Safe
Sanderson	Len Kiely	ALP	10.0
Fong Lim	Matthew Bonson	ALP	11.5
Fannie Bay	Clare Martin	ALP	15.7
Nightcliff	Jane Aagaard	ALP	15.7
Daly	Robert Knight	ALP	15.8
Karama	Delia Lawrie	ALP	16.0
Macdonnell	Alison Anderson	ALP	16.5
Johnston	Chris Burns	ALP	16.8
Casuarina	Kon Vatskalis	ALP	18.3
Stuart	Karl Hampton	ALP	18.9
Very safe
Wanguri	Paul Henderson	ALP	20.8
Arnhem	Malarndirri McCarthy	ALP	21.3
Arafura	Marion Scrymgour	ALP	23.6
Barkly	Elliot McAdam	ALP	24.2
Nhulunbuy	Syd Stirling	ALP	25.5

Country Liberal seats
Marginal
Greatorex	Matt Conlan	CLP	0.4
Drysdale	Chris Natt	CLP	0.5
Goyder	Ted Warren	CLP	0.5
Katherine	Fay Miller	CLP	2.7
Blain	Terry Mills	CLP	5.7
Fairly safe
Araluen	Jodeen Carney	CLP	7.5
Independent seats
Braitling	Loraine Braham	IND	0.9 v CLP
Nelson	Gerry Wood	IND	16.6 v CLP

=== Post-election pendulum ===
Labor seats
Marginal
Fannie Bay	Michael Gunner	ALP	1.1
Daly	Robert Knight	ALP	5.6
Fairly safe
Johnston	Chris Burns	ALP	8.1
Safe
Nightcliff	Jane Aagaard	ALP	10.7
Karama	Delia Lawrie	ALP	10.8
Arafura	Marion Scrymgour	ALP	14.0
Casuarina	Kon Vatskalis	ALP	14.2
Wanguri	Paul Henderson	ALP	14.9
Stuart	Karl Hampton	ALP	15.1
Barkly	Gerry McCarthy	ALP	15.6
Very safe
Nhulunbuy	Lynne Walker	ALP	24.2
Arnhem	Malarndirri McCarthy	ALP	Unopp
Macdonnell	Alison Anderson	ALP	Unopp

Country Liberal seats
Marginal
Fong Lim	Dave Tollner	CLP	2.1
Brennan	Peter Chandler	CLP	2.6
Port Darwin	John Elferink	CLP	2.8
Fairly safe
Sanderson	Peter Styles	CLP	6.4
Goyder	Kezia Purick	CLP	8.4
Katherine	Willem W-v-Holthe	CLP	8.4
Safe
Drysdale	Ross Bohlin	CLP	10.1
Blain	Terry Mills	CLP	11.6
Greatorex	Matt Conlan	CLP	16.5
Very safe
Braitling	Adam Giles	CLP	20.3 v GRN
Araluen	Jodeen Carney	CLP	24.7
Independent seats
Nelson	Gerry Wood	IND	28.7 v CLP
