= Jodeen Carney =

Australian politician

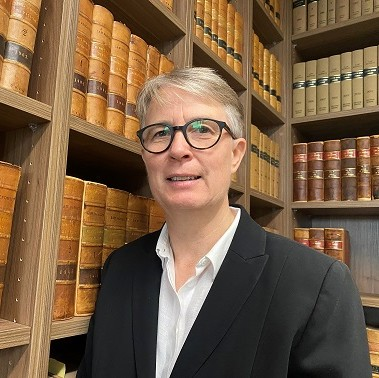

9th Leader of the Opposition in the Northern Territory
- In office 18 June 2005 – 29 January 2008
- Preceded by: Denis Burke
- Succeeded by: Terry Mills

Member of the Northern Territory Parliament for Araluen
- In office 18 August 2001 – 3 September 2010
- Preceded by: Eric Poole
- Succeeded by: Robyn Lambley

Personal details
- Born: 9 December 1965 (age 60) Melbourne, Victoria, Australia
- Party: Country Liberal (until 2015)

Jodeen Terese Carney (born 9 December 1965) is an Australian politician. She was a Country Liberal Party member of the Northern Territory Legislative Assembly from September 2001 to September 2010, representing the Alice Springs-based electorate of Araluen.

She was the Shadow Attorney-General, and Shadow Minister for Justice, Health, Family and Community Services, Business and Industry, Women's Policy, Territory Development, the AustralAsia Railway, Police, Fire and Emergency Services, Central Australia and Defence Support. Until 29 January 2008 she was also the Opposition Leader.

Carney is openly lesbian. She is the first and only LGBT person to have represented the Country Liberal Party in the Legislative Assembly and the first and only LGBT Opposition Leader. She is also the only lesbian and the first LGBT person to have ever been elected to the Legislative Assembly, as well as the first female leader of the Country Liberal Party.

Carney announced her resignation from parliament on 19 August 2010, effective 3 September. She cited health reasons as the primary cause of her resignation.

== Biography ==
=== Early life ===
Carney was born in Melbourne, Victoria, and studied at Bendigo High School before commencing a law degree at the University of Melbourne. She graduated in 1989 and moved to Alice Springs the following year in order to do her articles. In 1990, she was admitted to legal practice and worked as a solicitor for the next seven years. In 1997, she opened her own local practice, which she operated until deciding to contest pre-selection for the Legislative Assembly seat of Araluen at the 2001 election. Carney is openly lesbian and has been in a same-sex relationship for over twenty years.

=== Career ===
Northern Territory Legislative Assembly
Years	Term	Electoral division	Party
2001–2005	9th	Araluen	Country Liberal
2005–2008	10th	Araluen	Country Liberal
2008–2010	11th	Araluen	Country Liberal

Carney's bid for the pre-selection gained some media attention, as she was a reasonably high-profile candidate, but she was ultimately overlooked by the Alice Springs branch, who instead chose Peter Harvey. However, John Elferink, a sitting MP who had lost his preselection for MacDonnell, complained to the party's Central Council, making claims of branch-stacking. The fallout from the letter was immense—on 25 November 2000, in what was dubbed by the local media as "The Night of the Long Knives", all the preselections of the Alice Springs branch were overturned. The Central Council preselected Carney for Araluen, reinstated Elferink's preselection for MacDonnell, and pushed aside sitting minister Loraine Braham in Braitling in favour of Harvey. The controversial and largely unprecedented decision from head office earned Carney many enemies in the local branch of the party.

It was generally believed at the time that the Central Council's decision to preselect Carney for Araluen all but assured her a seat in parliament. Historically, Araluen had been a reasonably safe seat for the Country Liberal Party, and Labor had never come close to winning it. Longtime CLP MP Eric Poole held the seat with a seemingly insurmountable majority of 19.2 percent. However, Carney faced a significant challenge not only from Labor, but two well-known independents. The CLP lost over 27 percent of its primary vote from 1997, but Carney ultimately won by 134 votes.

In opposition, Carney took responsibility for several portfolios, including tourism, correctional services and communications. While she often acted as a conservative voice in the assembly on many issues, advocating a particularly hard line on issues of law and order (including mandatory sentencing) and drug policy, this was not always the case, as she also clashed with her own party on several issues—most notably in 2003, when she crossed the floor to vote with the ALP in supporting legislation decreasing the age of consent for gay males.

In mid-2003, Deputy Opposition Leader Mike Reed resigned, and Carney was widely tipped as the favourite to succeed him. However, in a surprise result—widely put down to both her poor relationship with the influential Alice Springs branch and her support, against their wishes, for Denis Burke's leadership, she was defeated by Dr. Richard Lim. However, she soon changed sides and decided to support Terry Mills after Burke refused to allow a conscience vote on the age of consent legislation. She was subsequently promoted, being made Shadow Attorney-General and Shadow Minister for Justice, and then again in late 2004, being made Shadow Minister for Health.

Carney faced her first re-election bid at the 2005 election. While commentators were generally divided on whether she would hold her seat, as it was the CLP's most marginal, almost no one expected the final result. On election day, there were massive and unprecedented swings to Labor in every seat in the Territory—except Araluen. While Burke, who had not long before regained the leadership, lost his seat of Brennan, which was the safest CLP seat in the Territory, Carney easily held her seat with a swing in her favour in the vicinity of five percent, proving to be in the least danger of the CLP's elected members. Araluen was the only seat that saw a swing to the CLP, which was cut down to only four seats.

Burke had already announced that he would stand down as leader if he lost the election. The loss of his own seat made this promise moot, and speculation turned to who would lead what remained of the CLP. Mills was unlikely to take up the leadership again after having resigned as leader not long before on the grounds that he had been ineffective, and potential aspirants John Elferink and Sue Carter had also been swept out in the Labor landslide. Carney emerged as the leading candidate in the CLP's much-reduced party room and was elected as Burke's replacement with Fay Miller as her deputy. Her deputy became Terry Mills later in the parliamentary term.

Though she had not been Opposition Leader for long, Carney oversaw a change in Country Liberal Party policy, shifting it notably to the left—such as attacking the government's law and order policies from a humanitarian, rather than hardline perspective—a position more traditionally aligned with the Labor government. She adopted a somewhat more congenial attitude towards Chief Minister Clare Martin than Mills and Burke had taken and tended to be more subtle in her means of attacking Martin.

On 29 January 2008, Mills asked Carney if she was willing to swap posts with him, with Mills becoming leader and Carney becoming deputy leader. Carney refused, instead calling a leadership spill. The vote was tied at two votes apiece. Under CLP rules, Carney could have theoretically remained leader. However, Carney announced that a tie was not a vote of confidence and resigned, echoing Prime Minister John Gorton's move in 1971. This left Mills to take the leadership unopposed on a second vote.

Carney announced her resignation from parliament on 19 August 2010, effective 3 September. She cited health reasons as the primary cause of her resignation. The CLP's refusal to disendorse Leo Abbott, who had been charged with domestic violence, as their candidate for the Federal seat of Lingiari was also a reason for her resigning,

Robyn Lambley, a former deputy mayor of Alice Springs, was elected in her place in a by-election. Terry Mills went on to become Chief Minister by winning the 2012 election. Carney is the earliest CLP leader who did not head a Northern Territory government. Carney resigned from the CLP in June 2015, citing dissatisfaction with Chief Minister Adam Giles.

Northern Territory Legislative Assembly
Preceded by Eric Poole	Member for Araluen; 2001–2010	Succeeded by Robyn Lambley
Political offices
Preceded by Denis Burke	Opposition Leader of the Northern Territory; 2005–2008	Succeeded by Terry Mills
Party political offices
Preceded by Denis Burke	Leader of the Country Liberal Party; 2005–2008	Succeeded by Terry Mills
