= 1995 Fannie Bay by-election =

- 17 June 1995
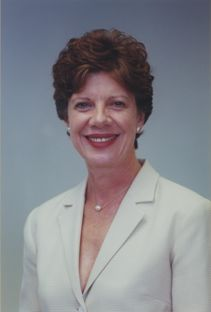

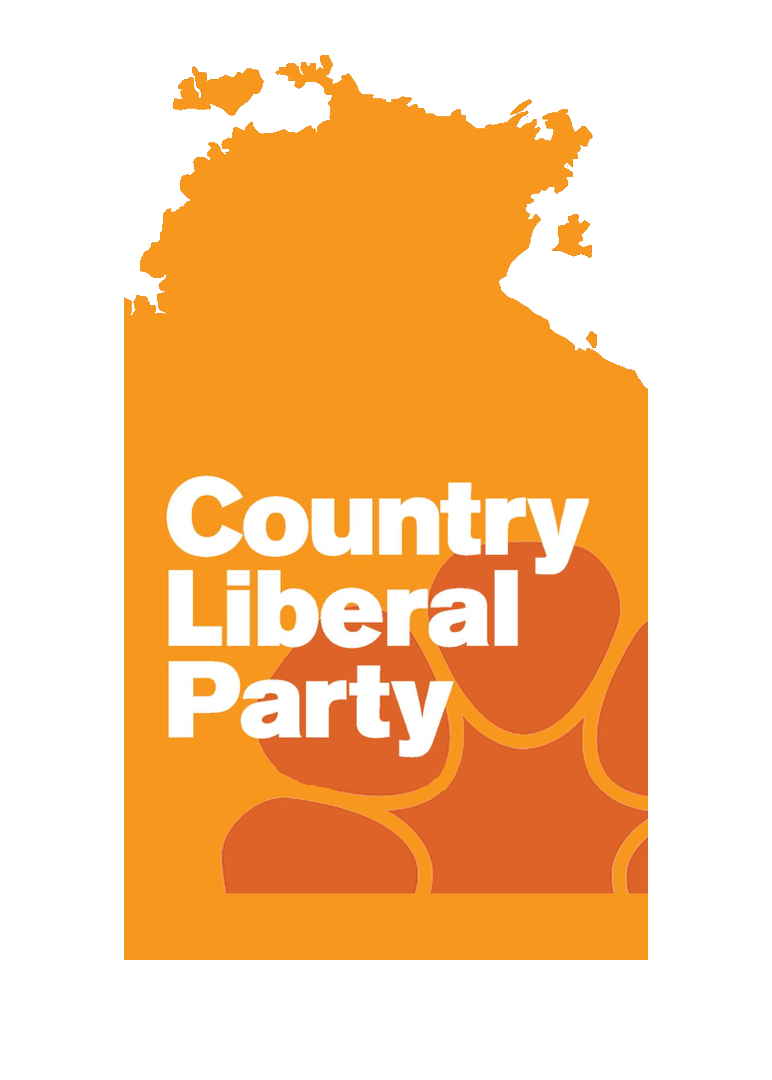
	First party	Second party
Candidate	Clare Martin	Margaret Lyons
Party	Labor	Country Liberal
Popular vote	1,339	1,270
Percentage	51.3	48.7
Swing	▲9.2pp	▼9.2pp
MP before election
Marshall Perron
Country Liberal
Elected MP
Clare Martin
Labor

A by-election for the seat of Fannie Bay in the Northern Territory Legislative Assembly was held on 17 June 1995. The by-election was triggered by the resignation of Chief Minister Marshall Perron of the Country Liberal Party (CLP). The seat had been held by Perron since 1983.

The CLP selected Fay Miller, Deputy Secretary to the Chief Minister. The Labor Party selected Clare Martin, an ABC Television and radio presenter.

== Results ==
Fannie Bay by-election, 1995
Party	Candidate	Votes	%	±%
Labor	Clare Martin	1,339	51.3	+9.2
Country Liberal	Margaret Lyons	1,270	48.7	−9.2
Total formal votes		2,609	96.0	−0.7
Informal votes		108	4.0	+0.7
Turnout		2,717	76.3	−10.9
Labor gain from Country Liberal		Swing	9.2	
