= Kezia Purick =

Australian politician

The Honourable Kezia Purick MLA

11th Speaker of the Northern Territory Legislative Assembly
- In office 23 October 2012 – 23 June 2020
- Deputy: Gary Higgins (2012–2015); Matt Conlan (2015–2016); Chansey Paech (2016–2020)
- Preceded by: Jane Aagaard
- Succeeded by: Chansey Paech

Member of the Northern Territory Legislative Assembly for Goyder
- In office 9 August 2008 – 24 August 2024
- Preceded by: Ted Warren
- Succeeded by: Andrew Mackay

Personal details
- Born: Kezia Dorcas Tibisay Purick; 12 May 1958 (age 67) Brisbane, Queensland, Australia
- Party: Country Liberal (2008–2015); Independent (2015–present)
- Relations: Noel Padgham-Purich (mother)
- Education: Methodist Ladies' College, Perth
- Alma mater: University of Western Australia
- Occupation: Business executive

Kezia Dorcas Tibisay Purick (born 12 May 1958) is an Australian politician. She was an independent member of the Northern Territory Legislative Assembly, first elected in the seat of Goyder in the 2008 election. Prior to entering Parliament, Purick was the CEO of the NT Minerals Council for 16 years. Originally elected as a member of the Country Liberal Party, she became an independent in 2015.

She served as Speaker of the Northern Territory Legislative Assembly since the CLP's victory in the 2012 Territory election, a post she retained after leaving the CLP. Following Territory Labor's landslide victory at the 2016 Territory election, the new Labor government retained Purick as Speaker. She resigned as speaker on 23 June 2020.

== Early life and education ==
Purick was born in Brisbane, Queensland. She was educated initially in Darwin for Primary School then in Western Australia at Methodist Ladies' College, Perth. She graduated with a Bachelor of Commerce from the University of Western Australia.

She worked for St John Ambulance Australia from 1985 until 1991, when she became CEO of the NT Minerals Council.

== Political career ==
Northern Territory Legislative Assembly
Years	Term	Electoral division	Party
2008–2012	11th	Goyder	Country Liberal
2012–2015	12th	Goyder	Country Liberal
2015–2016	Changed allegiance to:		Independent
2016–2020	13th	Goyder	Independent
2020–2024	14th	Goyder	Independent

Purick was preselected as CLP candidate for Goyder at the 2008 Territory election. The seat, long a CLP stronghold, had been taken by Labor's Ted Warren in Labor's 2005 landslide due to the splitting of the conservative vote by two conservatives standing along with the CLP candidate. A redistribution made the once vast rural seat slightly more compact, adding some conservative-leaning territory on Darwin's outer fringe. This was enough to erase Warren's already slim majority and make the seat a notional CLP seat. Purick defeated Warren on a swing of over seven percent, enough to revert Goyder to its traditional status as a safe CLP seat.

She served as shadow minister for Major Projects, Trade and Economic Development, Planning and Lands, Housing, Statehood and Women's Policy in the Territory opposition from 2008 to 2012. In addition, she was deputy leader of the CLP, and therefore deputy leader of the opposition.

Prior to the 2012 election, party leader Terry Mills indicated that should the party win government, Purick would remain as his deputy, and hence become Deputy Chief Minister. The parliamentary wing of the party overrode Mills' preference; Robyn Lambley was elected as deputy leader, and Purick was left out of cabinet.

When the parliament resumed on 23 October 2012, Purick was elected unopposed as Speaker of the Legislative Assembly. As Speaker, Purick is chairman of the House Committee, a member of the Standing Orders and Legal and Constitutional Affairs Committees and was the chairman of the select committee enquiring into foetal alcohol spectrum disorder.

As speaker, Purick was well known for criticising the federal government of Malcolm Turnbull, even though the CLP was part of the Liberal/National Coalition. When the federal Minister for Social Services Kevin Andrews, suggested de facto couples don't stay together as long as married couples, Purick took to Facebook to denounce him as a "pooncy, pasty faced person from some pissant place that no one cares about," and pointed out most of her constituents are in de facto relationships. She also threatened him with a "green rubber ring"—a castration device for young bulls—if he dared to tell her constituents how they should live.

On 20 July 2015, Purick announced that she was quitting the CLP because of her annoyance at the lack of integrity within the government and government's lack of communication with elected CLP members. She said she would continue to sit in parliament as an independent and wanted to remain as Speaker; both major parties supported keeping Purick in the speaker's chair. Purick's move to the crossbench reduced the CLP to a minority government; earlier in the year, three indigenous CLP MPs had also left the CLP to become independents. However, she undertook not to support any motion of no-confidence against the government for the remainder of the term, saying, "Territorians voted this government into office and have the ultimate right and responsibility to unelect it."

On 17 November 2015, Attorney-General John Elferink moved a motion to suspend standing orders to debate removing Purick from the Speaker's role, citing what he claimed were partial comments she had posted on Facebook regarding government-funded advertising about anti-ice legislation. On the morning of 18 November, the CLP and independent Larisa Lee passed Elferink's motion to spill the speakership role. The CLP nominated Matt Conlan to replace Purick. However, when the ballot to elect a new speaker was held, Labor and Delia Lawrie re-nominated Purick to stand against Conlan, and an unknown CLP member "crossed the floor" to vote for Purick, allowing her to regain her old post by 13 votes to 12.

Labor won a massive majority at the 2016 Territory election, reducing the CLP to only two seats—fewer than the five independents in the chamber. Although Labor had more than enough numbers to elect one of its own members as Speaker, the incoming government of Michael Gunner re-appointed Purick as Speaker.

In 2016 when Bess Price once interjected in her native language, Warlpiri, before being asked to withdraw her interjection by Speaker Kezia Purick, who later stated that unless given permission, debate in Parliament should be in English.

=== Corruption findings ===
In June 2020, the Northern Territory's Independent Commissioner Against Corruption (ICAC) found that Purick had engaged in "corrupt conduct" by attempting to interfere in the registration of a political party by the previous chief minister Terry Mills. She resigned as Speaker shortly afterwards. At the 2020 election, her popularity was undiminished and she won the seat of Goyder comfortably despite having 8 candidates run against her. On 15 February 2024 she has announced she will not be recontesting her seat at the next election.

== Personal life ==
Purick is one of six children and the daughter of former politician Noel Padgham, who was a member of the assembly from 1977 to 1997. Her father, Phillip Purich, was an appointed member for the Legislative Council in the 1960s. Born in Amsterdam, his family was originally from the Dalmatia region of Croatia.

Northern Territory Legislative Assembly
Preceded by Ted Warren	Member for Goyder; 2008–2024	Succeeded by Andrew Mackay
Preceded by Jane Aagaard	Speaker of the Northern Territory Legislative Assembly; 2012–2020	Succeeded by Chansey Paech
Party political offices
Preceded by Fay Miller	Deputy Leader of the Country Liberal Party; 2008–2012	Succeeded by Robyn Lambley
