= Rob Knight (politician) =

Australian politician

Daniel Robert Knight (born 1965 or 1966) is a former Australian politician. He was a Labor Party member of the Northern Territory Legislative Assembly from 2005 to 2012, representing the remote electorate of Daly. He served as Minister for Local Government and Minister for Central Australia from 2008 to 2012. He also served as the Deputy Speaker of the Legislative Assembly from 2006 to 2012, having been appointed to the position after the resignation of Len Kiely.

Northern Territory Legislative Assembly
Years	Term	Electoral division	Party
2005–2008	10th	Daly	Labor
2008–2012	11th	Daly	Labor

Prior to entering politics, Knight was a park ranger. He contested the newly created seat of Daly in the 2001 election against Country Liberal Party (CLP) candidate Tim Baldwin (who had represented the now-abolished seat of Victoria River, which had been redistributed to form Daly), but was unsuccessful.

He contested Daly again at the 2005 election after Baldwin retired, and was initially thought to have little chance of winning. Daly was a fairly safe CLP seat on paper; after a redistribution, the CLP held it on a notional majority of 9.5 percent. However, on election night the CLP primary vote almost halved, and Knight gained the seat with a swing of 24.6 percent, turning Daly from a safe CLP seat into a safe Labor seat at one stroke. Knight actually won a majority on the first count, allowing him to take the seat from the CLP without the need for preferences. Even considering the size of the Labor wave that swept through the Territory, Knight's victory was considered a shock result, as a swing of this magnitude is almost unheard of at any level in Australia.

Knight was reelected in 2008, but was defeated in 2012 by the CLP's Gary Higgins amid Labor's collapse in the remote portions of the Territory.

Northern Territory Legislative Assembly
Preceded by Tim Baldwin	Member for Daly; 2005–2012	Succeeded by Gary Higgins
