= Andrew Mackay (Australian politician) =

Australian politician

Andrew Mackay MLA

Member of the Northern Territory Legislative Assembly for Goyder
- Incumbent
- Assumed office 24 August 2024
- Preceded by: Kezia Purick

Personal details
- Party: Country Liberal Party

Andrew Mackay is an Australian politician from the Country Liberal Party.

Prior to his election, he was a member of Litchfield Council. In the 2024 Northern Territory general election, he was elected to the Northern Territory Legislative Assembly in Goyder.

Northern Territory Legislative Assembly
Preceded by Kezia Purick	Member for Goyder; 2024–present	Incumbent
