= Jane Aagaard =

Australian politician

The Honourable Jane Aagaard AM

8th Speaker of the Northern Territory Legislative Assembly
- In office 29 June 2005 – 23 October 2012
- Preceded by: Loraine Braham
- Succeeded by: Kezia Purick

Member of the Northern Territory Legislative Assembly for Nightcliff
- In office 18 August 2001 – 6 August 2012
- Preceded by: Stephen Hatton
- Succeeded by: Natasha Fyles

Personal details
- Born: Jane Lesley Aagaard; 1956 (age 69–70) Melbourne, Victoria
- Party: Labor Party
- Education: QUT
- Occupation: Public relations officer

Jane Lesley Aagaard AM (born 1956) is an Australian former politician. She was a Labor Party member of the Northern Territory Legislative Assembly from 2001 to 2012, representing the Darwin-based electorate of Nightcliff. She was the Speaker of the Assembly from June 2005 until October 2012—the first Labor member ever to hold the post. Prior to holding the speakership, she had served as Health Minister from 2001 to 2003.

== Early life ==
Northern Territory Legislative Assembly
Years	Term	Electoral division	Party
2001–2005	9th	Nightcliff	Labor
2005–2008	10th	Nightcliff	Labor
2008–2012	11th	Nightcliff	Labor

Jane Aagaard was born in Melbourne, Victoria in 1956, to John Stuart McIntosh and Jean Brown. She moved to Brisbane, Queensland at the age of seven, where she was educated at Somerville House, a school for girls in South Brisbane.

In 1986, she accepted a position with the Northern Territory Department of Mines and Energy, and settled with her husband in Darwin.

Aagaard also became heavily involved in many aspects of the Darwin community. She helped found the Brolga Awards and Northern Territory Sports Awards, and continued organising both presentations for several years. Not long before entering parliament, she had also organised the city's commemoration of its bombing by Japanese forces during World War II.

When former Chief Minister Stephen Hatton, the longtime CLP member for Nightcliff, retired at the 2001 election, Aagaard ran as the Labor candidate against Hatton's son, Jason. In a shock result, Aagaard won the seat on an unexpectedly large swing of 11.7 percent that saw the previously marginal Nightcliff technically become a safe Labor seat. Aagaard's victory was part of a six-seat swing to Labor that saw the party win government for the first time ever, mainly on the strength of a strong performance in the Darwin area. She was reelected in 2005, picking up a healthy swing of 8.5 percent.

In March 2012, Aagaard announced that she would not contest the next election due to "ongoing medical issues that would require treatment and surgery". In November 2012, Aagaard was granted the title The Honourable for life.

Northern Territory Legislative Assembly
Preceded by Stephen Hatton	Member for Nightcliff; 2001–2012	Succeeded by Natasha Fyles
Preceded by Loraine Braham	Speaker of the Northern Territory Legislative Assembly; 2005–2012	Succeeded by Kezia Purick
