= Peter Maley =

Australian politician, barrister, solicitor and magistrate

Peter John Maley (born 2 August 1969) is a controversial former Australian politician, barrister, solicitor and magistrate. He was the member for Goyder in the Northern Territory Legislative Assembly from 2001 to 2005, primarily as a member of the Country Liberal Party, but also for a short period as an independent member.

Northern Territory Legislative Assembly
| Years | Term | Electoral division | Party |
|---|---|---|---|
| 2001–2005 | 9th | Goyder | Country Liberal |
| 2005 | Changed allegiance to: | | Independent |

Maley studied law at the University College of the Northern Territory obtaining a bachelor of laws with honours from the University of Queensland, worked at Philip and Mitaros, then became a police prosecutor, later lecturing in law part-time at the Northern Territory University. He went into private practice with the firm Withnall, Maley & Co. He was elected to parliament in 2001 and served on the CLP front-bench. In 2005 he was attacked by party leader Denis Burke for spending too much time on outside work. On 19 May 2005 Maley was dismissed by Burke from the party's parliamentary wing, which was the same day that details of a Domestic Violence Order brought by his wife were plastered across the front page of the Northern Territory News. The order was later dropped.

Maley returned to private practice as a Barrister and Solicitor in his own practice Maley's Barristers and Solicitors after the 2005 election.

On 16 September 2013 the Attorney-General for the Northern Territory, John Elferink announced three new appointments to the Northern Territory Court of Summary Jurisdiction. One of the Appointees was Maley. At the time, the Australian Labor Party's Gerry McCarthy stated that it was a "job for the boys" as it was another example of a former CLP politician being given a high profile and important job. Mr Elferink said "Mr Maley has over 19 years of experience as a legal practitioner, working across a broad range of legal disciplines.

Since being appointed a magistrate Maley continued to be involved in the Country Liberal Party by:

- By campaigning for the Country Liberal Party by handing out how-to-vote cards for the CLP during the Blain by-election in March 2014.

- Being a director Foundation 51, which The Australian newspaper referred to as a CLP-aligned research company that contributed significantly to the 2014 Blain by-election campaign and the Australian Labor Party called a slush fund. Maley issued a statement on 8 May 2014 saying he would have no further involvement with Foundation 51.

- Allegedly, Maley tried to bribe and intimidate Ms Larisa Lee. Ms Lee has told Northern Parliament Parliament that on 23 February 2014 Ms Lee had a telephone conversation with Maley regarding her currently deliberations about becoming an independent member of parliament. Lee indicated that Maley suggested that something very good was coming her way soon, that she would have her own cheque book and that if she became an independent the Country Liberals government would attack her. In response the allegations Maley denied acting inappropriately and stated: “I had a conversation with Ms Lee. I repudiate entirely the characterisation of the conversation referred to. I emphatically deny any suggestion that I may have acted unethically or inappropriately at any time either personally or on behalf of the Country Liberal Party,”

- The Country Liberal Party government deciding to grant large water licences to Maley, to which Environment Centre NT chief executive Stuart Blanch suggested was water cronyism. Minister for Land Resource Management Willem Westra Van Holthe rejected any such allegation of cronyism.

- Maley suggesting he is a member of a political party while being questioned on stage at an event for the Darwin Festival in August 2014.

Prior to his appointment as Magistrate, Maley made a $5,000 donation to the re-election campaign of Attorney-General John Elferink, who put forth Mr Maley's nomination as magistrate.

Northern Territory Bar Association has raised concerns about the Maley's conduct since his judicial appointment with their president, Mr John Lawrence SC, stating: “The established rules of judicial conduct require magistrates to cease involvement in politics after their appointment. It appears that Mr Maley has not done that...the public must have complete confidence in the independence of Territory magistrates. That confidence has been undermined by Mr Maley’s conduct which suggests an ongoing and close connection between Mr Maley and the Government".

Northern Territory Legislative Assembly
| Preceded by Terry McCarthy | Member for Goyder; 2001–2005 | Succeeded by Ted Warren |
