= 2005 Northern Territory general election =

Territorial election in Australia

- 18 June 2005

All 25 seats of the Northern Territory Legislative Assembly 13 seats needed for a majority
- Turnout: 80.07 (▼0.49 pp)
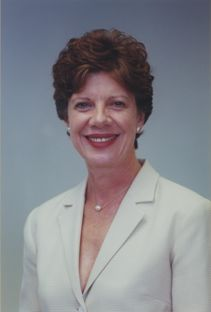

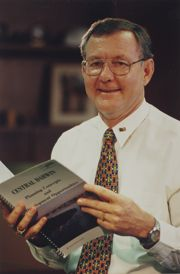
	First party	Second party
Leader	Clare Martin	Denis Burke
Party	Labor	Country Liberal
Leader since	3 February 1999	7 February 2005
Leader's seat	Fannie Bay	Brennan (lost seat)
Last election	13 seats	10 seats
Seats won	19	4
Seat change	▲6	▼6
Popular vote	44,822	30,827
Percentage	51.9%	35.7%
Swing	▲11.3	▼9.7
TPP	59.1%	40.9%
TPP	▲11.1	▼11.1
Chief Minister before election
Clare Martin
Labor
Elected Chief Minister
Clare Martin
Labor

A general election was held in the Northern Territory, Australia, on 18 June 2005. The centre-left Labor Party, led by Chief Minister Clare Martin, won a second term with a landslide victory, winning six of the ten seats held by the opposition Country Liberal Party in the 25-member Northern Territory Legislative Assembly, bringing their total to 19. It was the second largest victory in any Northern Territory election. The only larger majority in the history of the Territory was in the first election, in 1974. In that contest, the CLP won 17 of the 19 seats in the chamber, and faced only two independents as opposition.

The most notable casualty was Opposition Leader Denis Burke's loss of his own seat of Brennan. It was only the second time a party leader in the Territory had been defeated in his own electorate, after Majority Leader Goff Letts losing his seat of Victoria River in 1977.

== Overall result ==
↓
19	2	4
ALP	Ind	CLP

Results of the 2005 Northern Territory general election, Legislative Assembly
Party	Votes	%	+/–	Seats	+/–
Labor	44,822	51.94	▲11.34	19	+6
Country Liberal	30,827	35.73	▼9.65	4	-6
Independents	7,045	8.16	▼2.39	2	±0
Greens	3,594	4.17	▲4.17	0	±0
Total	86,288	100.00	–	25	–
Valid votes	86,288	96.25			
Invalid/blank votes	3,358	3.75	-0.52		
Total votes	89,646	100.00	–		
Registered voters/turnout	111,954	80.07	-0.49		
Labor	51,026	59.13			
Country Liberal	35,262	40.87			
Total	86,288	100.00			

Popular vote
Labor	51.94%
Country Liberal	35.73%
Greens	4.17%
Independents	8.16%

Two-party-preferred vote
Labor	59.10%
Country Liberal	40.90%

Seats
Labor	76.00%
Country Liberal	16.00%
Independents	8.00%

The Labor Party won 52.5% of the primary vote, which was an increase of 11.9% over the 2001 election. The opposition Country Liberal Party polled 35.3%, a drop of 10.1% from 2001. The two party preferred result was Labor on 59.1% to the CLP on 40.9%, a swing to Labor of 11.1% from the previous election. It was the first time that Labor had won a majority of the two-party vote at a Territory election; the CLP had won a narrow majority of the two-party vote four years earlier. The Northern Territory Greens ran an increased number of candidates, and managed to increase their vote through much of Darwin, but had very little effect on the outcome of the election.

Labor won 19 seats against the CLP's four seats. Two independent members, Loraine Braham and Gerry Wood, were also re-elected. While Labor had been favoured to win a second term, most commentators had predicted a gain of one or two seats at best. The size of the Labor landslide took even the most optimistic Labor observers by surprise. Labor took six seats off the CLP. Five of them – Brennan, Daly, Drysdale, Goyder and Port Darwin – were formerly safely conservative seats that Labor had never won before in the history of the Assembly. The ALP also retrieved the seat of MacDonnell, which had been a comfortably safe Labor seat until its shock fall to the CLP in 1997. The CLP also very narrowly failed to win back the formerly safe seat of Braitling from independent Loraine Braham, despite a strong challenge from CLP candidate Michael Jones.

Despite recording its worst-ever result, the CLP retained two seats that the ALP had targeted. The ALP selected Alice Springs mayor Fran Kilgariff, daughter of CLP founder Bernie Kilgariff, as its candidate in Greatorex, against CLP Deputy Leader Dr Richard Lim. Despite the swing against the CLP elsewhere in the Territory, Lim narrowly retained his seat. The CLP recorded a swing in only one seat, Araluen, where Jodeen Carney retained what had previously been the party's most marginal seat.

The severity of the landslide result was all the more surprising considering that the ALP had never before been in government until 2001. The Legislative Assembly had been created in 1974, and the CLP had held government for an unbroken stretch of 27 years before Clare Martin won the ALP's first victory in 2001. The victory was seen in many cases not only as an endorsement of Martin's leadership, but also an endorsement of Labor's ability to govern. The CLP had consistently alleged that the ALP was unfit to govern the Territory, and had used this as a key tactic during election campaigns many times in the past. However, it was also seen as being a vote of no-confidence in the opposition, and in the days after the election result, conservative Prime Minister John Howard strongly criticised the CLP for what he saw as their poor performance in opposition. Furthermore, the reduction of the CLP to just four seats raised questions as to whether it was viable for them to continue to be separate from the Liberal-National Coalition, which operates at federal level and in every other state and territory.

There were several prominent casualties of the election, but none was more significant or surprising than the defeat of Opposition Leader Denis Burke in the Palmerston-area seat of Brennan. Brennan was the CLP's safest seat anywhere in the Territory, with a CLP majority of 19 percent. The ALP had never come close to winning any seats in Palmerston before. There had been no suggestion from any major commentators or opinion polls that Burke was even remotely under threat, but he was swept aside on election day with a swing against him of more than 21%. The ALP candidate, James Burke, a virtually unknown labor lawyer, expressed shock at his own win, and became a party legend overnight. Denis Burke had already stated that he would resign as party leader if he lost the election, but the loss of his seat forced the party to find a new leader immediately. The four remaining CLP members unanimously replaced Burke with Shadow Attorney-General and Shadow Health Minister Jodeen Carney. Another shock result came in Daly in the remote northern portion of the Territory. It had previously been a reasonably safe CLP seat; retiring member Tim Baldwin held it with a majority of 9.5 percent. However, Labor challenger Rob Knight took the seat on an unheard-of swing of 24 percent, turning it into a safe Labor seat in one stroke.

While the loss of Burke was a major shock, the defeat of three other CLP sitting members, Sue Carter (Port Darwin) Stephen Dunham (Drysdale) and John Elferink (MacDonnell) also posed major problems for the party. Elferink had been the Leader of Opposition Business, Opposition Whip and Shadow Minister for Community Development, Housing, Local Government, Sport and Recreation, Regional Development, and Indigenous Affairs, Dunham had been the Shadow Minister for Transport and Infrastructure, Lands and Planning, Parks and Wildlife and Essential Services, and Carter had been the Shadow Minister for Family and Community Services, Environment and Heritage, Arts and Museums and Women's Policy. In the aftermath of their defeat, all of these portfolios had to be redistributed among the four remaining CLP members, Carney (Araluen), Dr Richard Lim (Greatorex) Fay Miller (Katherine) and Terry Mills (Blain). This has raised concerns from both sides of politics about the CLP's ability to mount any form of effective opposition in the new parliament.

The two independent members of the outgoing parliament, disendorsed former CLP minister Loraine Braham and former Litchfield Mayor Gerry Wood both managed to retain their seats. In the lead-up to the election, there had been some suggestion that Wood may have some difficulty retaining his seat, but Braham had been widely expected to win another term. The final result turned out to be the opposite; Wood cruised to victory with a massive 15 percent swing in his favour, whereas Braham very narrowly retained her seat in a result that was not known for several days after the election. The election was a disappointment for other independent candidates; Wood's successor as Litchfield Mayor, Mary Walshe, fell well short of expectations in Goyder, and Wadeye councillor Dale Seaniger failed to make much impact in Daly.

As in past elections, minor parties failed to make much impact at the 2005 election. While the Northern Territory Greens ran an increased number of candidates and increased their votes, none of their candidates, including leader Ilana Eldridge came close to winning a seat, and their preferences had comparatively little effect on the outcome of any seats, let alone the election. The Network Against Prohibition ran in several seats, but did noticeably poorly. The Australian Democrats ran candidates in only two seats, a significant decrease from 2001, and barely rated at all. The Socialist Alliance chose not to run any candidates for financial reasons, instead endorsing the Green and NAP candidates.

== Issues ==
Law and order has always been a prominent issue in the Northern Territory, and the Country Liberal Party campaigned on this heavily during their 27-year unbroken stint in government. Perhaps in acknowledgment of this, the Labor Party is also attempting to present itself as being harsh on antisocial behaviour. Mandatory sentencing is an issue in the background; there is some dispute as to its popularity in the Territory, and it is likely that a CLP government would reintroduce the policy, whereas it will almost definitely remain abolished under an ALP government.

== The campaign ==
Election campaign, 2005
	Government	Opposition
Party	Labor	Country Liberals
Leader	Martin	Burke
Leader since	1999	1999
Seats held	13	10
Seats needed	0	3

While there had been a form of unofficial campaign going on for some months, due to the persistent rumours of a coming election, there had been comparatively little in the way of policy announcements or major developments. Both parties began trading accusations that the other was being overly influenced by "southerners", with the ALP noting that the CLP had hired controversial federal Liberal staffer Ian Hanke and taking advantage of Burke's statements that he had had assistance from the federal Liberals in drafting his economic policies. At the same time, the CLP has been trying to link Martin's fortunes to those of less popular federal Labor leader Kim Beazley, and has suggested that she is being overly influenced by the federal party. (Where the CLP exists only in the Northern Territory, but is allied with the federal Liberals, the ALP is an entirely federal party.)

The CLP has also suffered due to a damaging row between Burke and former Shadow Minister Peter Maley, culminating in Maley's expulsion from the party on 19 May 2005. While Maley had once been touted as a potential leadership contender, he was later dumped from the ministry, and soon after announced his intention to retire at the 2005 election. Maley had reportedly not told Burke of his decision to retire before telling the media, and combined with his earlier axing, this aggravated tensions between the two. When the story broke on that Maley's wife had taken out a court order against him over domestic violence issues (although this was quickly withdrawn), Burke abruptly expelled Maley from the party. Maley served out the last weeks of his term as an independent, and briefly threatened to run for re-election, before deciding to publicly endorse the ALP candidate in his seat.

With the official announcement of the election on 30 May, the campaign began in earnest. Both parties made their first major policy launch on 1 June, with the ALP announcing plans to introduce laws cracking down on habitual drunks involved in antisocial behaviour, forcing them to undergo treatment or face jail, with a special alcohol court planned to deal with these offences. In contrast, the CLP concentrated on the economy, launching its "Territory 2020" plan to encourage business growth in the Territory, which amongst other things, would involve setting up a fund to encourage innovation and providing assistance to the armoured vehicle maintenance industry (Due to its location, Darwin, the Territory's capital, is a major defence hub, and defence industries are particularly important to the city's economy).

== Retiring Members ==
=== Labor ===
- Jack Ah Kit MLA (Arnhem)

=== CLP ===
- Tim Baldwin MLA (Daly)

=== Independent ===
- Peter Maley MLA (Goyder) – elected as CLP

== Candidates ==
Sitting members are listed in bold. Successful candidates are highlighted in the relevant colour.

Electorate	Held by	Labor	CLP	Greens	Independent
Arafura	Labor	**Marion Scrymgour**	August Stevens	George Pascoe	
Araluen	CLP	John Gaynor	**Jodeen Carney**	Alan Tyley	
Arnhem	Labor	Barbara McCarthy	Djuwalpi Marika	Lance Lawrence	
Barkly	Labor	**Elliot McAdam**	Val Dyer		Janeen Bulsey
Blain	CLP	Brendan Cabry	**Terry Mills**	Sue McKinnon	Duncan Dean
Braitling	Independent	Sue West	Michael Jones		**Loraine Braham**
Brennan	CLP	James Burke	**Denis Burke**		Nelly Riley
Casuarina	Labor	**Kon Vatskalis**	Wendy Green		Gary Mills; Scott White
Daly	CLP	Rob Knight	Debbi Aloisi	Elke Stegemann	Dale Seaniger
Drysdale	CLP	Chris Natt	**Stephen Dunham**		
Fannie Bay	Labor	**Clare Martin**	Edward Fry		Fiona Clarke
Goyder	CLP	Ted Warren	Keith Phasey	Diana Rickard	Andrew Blackadder; Mary Walshe
Greatorex	CLP	Fran Kilgariff	**Richard Lim**	David Mortimer	
Johnston	Labor	**Chris Burns**	Ross Connolly	Kate Neely	Gary Meyerhoff; Steve Saint
Karama	Labor	**Delia Lawrie**	Trevor Sellick		
Katherine	CLP	Sharon Hillen	**Fay Miller**		
Macdonnell	CLP	Alison Anderson	**John Elferink**	Andrew Longmire	David Chewings; Vincent Forrester
Millner	Labor	**Matthew Bonson**	Paul Mossman	Rob Hoad	Rob Inder-Smith; Phil Mitchell
Nelson	Independent	Lisa McKinney-Smith	Chris Lugg		**Gerry Wood**
Nhulunbuy	Labor	**Syd Stirling**	Peter Manning		
Nightcliff	Labor	**Jane Aagaard**	Anthony Reiter	Ilana Eldridge	Andrew Arthur; Stuart Highway
Port Darwin	CLP	Kerry Sacilotto	**Sue Carter**		
Sanderson	Labor	**Len Kiely**	Peter Styles		
Stuart	Labor	**Peter Toyne**	Anna Machado		
Wanguri	Labor	**Paul Henderson**	Kerrie Kyriacou		

=== Unregistered parties and groups ===
Two parties that did not hold registration with the Northern Territory Electoral Commission at the time of the election nevertheless endorsed candidates.

- The Australian Democrats endorsed Janeen Bulsey in Barkly and Duncan Dean in Blain.
- The Network Against Prohibition endorsed Scott White in Casuarina, Fiona Clarke in Fannie Bay, Gary Meyerhoff in Johnston, Rob Inder-Smith in Millner, and Stuart Highway in Nightcliff.

== Seats changing hands ==
Seat	Pre-2005			Swing	Post-2005		
Seat	Party	Member	Margin	Swing	Margin	Member	Party
Brennan	Country Liberal	Denis Burke	19.0	20.8	1.8	James Burke	Labor
Daly	Country Liberal	Tim Baldwin	9.5	24.4	14.8	Rob Knight	Labor
Drysdale	Country Liberal	Stephen Dunham	15.7	16.9	1.3	Chris Natt	Labor
Goyder	Country Liberal	Peter Maley	14.8	16.4	1.6	Ted Warren	Labor
Macdonnell	Country Liberal	John Elferink	11.8	20.3	8.5	Alison Anderson	Labor
Port Darwin	Country Liberal	Sue Carter	7.3	8.4	1.1	Kerry Sacilotto	Labor

- Members listed in italics did not contest their seats at this election.

== Party leaders ==
- Clare Martin has been an MLA since 1995, leader of the Northern Territory ALP since 1997, and Chief Minister since 2001. A former journalist, she had overseen the ALP's first election victory in the history of the Territory in 2001. Martin had gained a reputation for being an effective communicator and economic manager, having also served a stint as treasurer. She campaigned largely on issues of law and order, and took some flak from her own party faithful for her policies, but would likely feel vindicated by the election result.
- Denis Burke had been an MLA since 1994 and had served as Chief Minister from 1999 to 2001. He had continued as Opposition Leader after being defeated by Martin, but was dumped in favour of Terry Mills in mid-2003, only to regain the leadership in February 2005 after Mills' sudden resignation. The former army officer is a strong social conservative, but had specifically emphasised law and order issues throughout his career, culminating in his controversial maintenance of the CLP's mandatory detention policy during his time as Chief Minister. His campaign was marred by several gaffes and a bold plan to solve the territory's electricity problems which was badly sold to the electorate and was not well received. He had already stated his intention to step down if the CLP lost the election before ultimately losing his own seat.
- Ilana Eldridge has been the leader of the Northern Territory Greens since their formation in the early 1990s. She has never held elected office, but has developed some profile from unsuccessful campaigns for the Senate in 1990 and 1996 and the Australian House of Representatives in 1998 and 2004. While again failing to win the seat of Nightcliff, she oversaw the only major third party campaign in the election, with the Greens substantially increasing both their number of candidates and their overall vote.

== Electoral pendulum ==
The following pendulum is known as the Mackerras pendulum, invented by psephologist Malcolm Mackerras. The pendulum works by lining up all of the seats held in the Legislative Assembly according to the percentage point margin they are held by on a two-party-preferred basis. This is also known as the swing required for the seat to change hands. Given a uniform swing to the opposition or government parties, the number of seats that change hands can be predicted.

=== Pre-election pendulum ===
Incumbent members who have become and remained an independent since the 2012 election are indicated in grey.

Members listed in italics did not re-contest their seat at the election.

Labor seats
Marginal
Millner	Matthew Bonson	ALP	1.2
Johnston	Chris Burns	ALP	2.9
Sanderson	Len Kiely	ALP	3.0
Casuarina	Kon Vatskalis	ALP	3.5
Karama	Delia Lawrie	ALP	3.7
Fairly safe
Nightcliff	Jane Aagaard	ALP	7.1
Wanguri	Paul Henderson	ALP	7.2
Arafura	Marion Scrymgour	ALP	8.9
Fannie Bay	Clare Martin	ALP	9.8
Safe
Arnhem	Jack Ah Kit	ALP	11.4
Barkly	Elliot McAdam	ALP	13.4
Nhulunbuy	Syd Stirling	ALP	16.1
Stuart	Peter Toyne	ALP	17.8

Country Liberal seats
Marginal
Araluen	Jodeen Carney	CLP	2.0
Fairly safe
Port Darwin	Sue Carter	CLP	7.3
Macdonnell	John Elferink	CLP	8.5
Greatorex	Richard Lim	CLP	9.0
Daly	Tim Baldwin	CLP	9.5
Safe
Goyder	Peter Maley	CLP	14.8
Katherine	Fay Miller	CLP	15.3
Drysdale	Stephen Dunham	CLP	15.7
Blain	Terry Mills	CLP	16.7
Brennan	Denis Burke	CLP	19.0
Independent seats
Nelson	Gerry Wood	IND	1.1 v CLP
Braitling	Loraine Braham	IND	5.5 v CLP

=== Post-election pendulum ===
Labor seats
Marginal
Port Darwin	Kerry Sacilotto	ALP	1.1
Drysdale	Chris Natt	ALP	1.3
Goyder	Ted Warren	ALP	1.6
Brennan	James Burke	ALP	1.8
Fairly safe
Sanderson	Len Kiely	ALP	8.4
Safe
Macdonnell	Alison Anderson	ALP	11.8
Millner	Matthew Bonson	ALP	12.8 v IND
Daly	Robert Knight	ALP	14.8
Nightcliff	Jane Aagaard	ALP	15.5
Johnston	Chris Burns	ALP	15.6
Karama	Delia Lawrie	ALP	17.0
Fannie Bay	Clare Martin	ALP	18.6
Casuarina	Kon Vatskalis	ALP	19.0
Very safe
Wanguri	Paul Henderson	ALP	20.8
Stuart	Karl Hampton	ALP	21.0
Barkly	Elliot McAdam	ALP	23.0
Arafura	Marion Scrymgour	ALP	23.6
Arnhem	Malarndirri McCarthy	ALP	23.9
Nhulunbuy	Syd Stirling	ALP	26.1

Country Liberal seats
Marginal
Greatorex	Matt Conlan	CLP	1.4
Katherine	Fay Miller	CLP	2.6
Fairly safe
Blain	Terry Mills	CLP	7.2
Araluen	Jodeen Carney	CLP	7.3
Independent seats
Braitling	Loraine Braham	IND	0.9 v CLP
Nelson	Gerry Wood	IND	16.2 v CLP
