= Delia Lawrie =

Australian politician

10th Leader of the Opposition in the Northern Territory
- In office 29 August 2012 – 20 April 2015
- Deputy: Gerry McCarthy
- Preceded by: Terry Mills
- Succeeded by: Michael Gunner

Member of the Northern Territory Legislative Assembly for Karama
- In office 18 August 2001 – 27 August 2016
- Preceded by: Mick Palmer
- Succeeded by: Ngaree Ah Kit

Personal details
- Born: Delia Phoebe Lawrie; 30 July 1966 (age 60) Darwin, Northern Territory, Australia
- Party: Labor Party (until 2015); Independent (from 2015)
- Relations: Dawn Lawrie (mother)
- Children: Three
- Occupation: Journalist

Delia Phoebe Lawrie (born 30 July 1966) is an Australian politician. She was a member of the Northern Territory Legislative Assembly from 2001 to 2016, representing the electorate of Karama. She was a Labor member from 2001 to 2015, and served as party leader and Leader of the Opposition from 2012 to 2015. On 10 October 2015, following her loss of Labor preselection to recontest her seat at the 2016 election, she resigned from the party to sit as an independent.

== Early life ==
Born in the original Darwin Hospital, she attended Nightcliff Primary and Nightcliff Middle School. She then worked as a journalist and then as an industrial officer before entering Parliament.

== Political career ==
Northern Territory Legislative Assembly
Years	Term	Electoral division	Party
2001–2005	9th	Karama	Labor
2005–2008	10th	Karama	Labor
2008–2012	11th	Karama	Labor
2012–2015	12th	Karama	Labor
2015–2016	Changed allegiance to:		Independent

After Territory Labor won the second-largest majority government in the history of the Territory at the 2005 election, Lawrie was promoted to Chief Minister Clare Martin's cabinet as Minister for Family and Community Services and Minister for Sport and Recreation. In a 2006 cabinet reshuffle, she dropped Sport and Recreation and added Lands and Planning, Transport, and Multicultural Affairs.

Martin retired in 2007, and was succeeded by Paul Henderson. Following the resignation of Deputy Chief Minister Marion Scrymgour, Henderson named Lawrie deputy leader and hence Deputy Chief Minister. She also served as Treasurer, Attorney-General and Minister for Justice. Following 25 August 2012 territory elections at which Labor was defeated, Henderson resigned as party leader and Lawrie was elected as his replacement.

In 2012, the Henderson Labor government granted Unions NT a rent-free ten-year lease of the historic Stella Maris site in Darwin. An inquiry into the circumstances of the grant was initiated by the CLP government after the 2012 territory election, and commissioner John Lawler found that the process was not transparent, and that the conduct of Lawrie (then treasurer) and Gerry McCarthy (then lands minister) in relation to the grant was "not accountable or responsible". Lawrie claimed she had been denied procedural fairness, and took the case to the NT Supreme Court, which dismissed her case on 1 April 2015. Attorney-general John Elferink then referred Lawrie to the Northern Territory Police for investigation of "possible breaches of the criminal law". After the failure of the Supreme Court case, the Labor caucus announced it had lost confidence in Lawrie's leadership, and passed a spill motion. Michael Gunner announced that he would challenge Lawrie for the leadership. However, on 19 April, Lawrie announced she was resigning as leader to focus on the legal investigation, leaving Gunner to take the leadership unopposed. Lawrie is the first Territory Labor leader who did not take the party into an election.

She declined a place in Gunner's shadow ministry and became the only backbench member of the eight-member ALP Caucus.

In October 2015, the NT branch of the Labor Party disendorsed Lawrie due to concerns that her legal issues were harming Labor's election chances. Labor instead preselected Ngaree Ah Kit as its candidate in Karama at the next election. A few days after being disendorsed, Lawrie resigned from the Labor Party, and stated that she would consider recontesting her seat as an independent candidate at the next election. She was narrowly defeated by Ah Kit at the election on preferences.

In May 2019, leaked text messages suggested that Lawrie was behind a move to oust Michael Gunner, the man who ousted her as Labor leader, as Chief Minister and replace him with Infrastructure Minister Eva Lawler. Lawler denied any moves to oust Gunner. Lawrie ruled out running as an independent in the 2020 election after becoming NT manager of the non-government organisation Child Wise.

In March 2020, she became the senior adviser to Terry Mills, leader of the Territory Alliance party.

== Personal life ==
Delia Lawrie is the daughter of former Northern Territory politician Dawn Lawrie.

Northern Territory Legislative Assembly
Preceded by Mick Palmer	Member for Karama; 2001–2016	Succeeded by Ngaree Ah Kit
Political offices
Preceded by Terry Mills	Leader of the Opposition; 2012–2015	Succeeded by Michael Gunner
Party political offices
Preceded by Paul Henderson	Leader of the Labor Party in the Northern Territory; 2012–2015	Succeeded by Michael Gunner
