= James Burke (Australian politician) =

Australian politician

James Patrick Burke (born 4 February 1971) is an Australian former politician. He was a Labor Party member of the Northern Territory Legislative Assembly between 2005 and 2008, representing the electorate of Brennan.

== Early life ==
James Burke was born in Port Moresby, Papua New Guinea in 1971. His family were due to move to Darwin just after Christmas of 1974, but were delayed by the onset of Cyclone Tracy, which virtually obliterated the city. The family eventually moved to Darwin in 1976. Burke studied politics and law at the University College of the Northern Territory (then part of the University of Queensland), but switched to the equivalent course at the new Northern Territory University in 1989. He was involved in student politics throughout his time at university.

Burke was a founding member of the Darwin Youth Sister City Organisation (DYSCO), a community youth group within the Darwin City Council's Sister Cities programs. He was also a member of the Haikou Sister City Community Committee. In 1994, James was one of four students to go to Haikou, China on a 12-month exchange.

== Early career ==
Burke was employed in the Northern Territory Public Service from 1995 to 2000, in Territory Health Services then the Office of the Public Trustee. Burke went to Melbourne to pursue his legal career having been unable to secure a position with a local firm. He worked as a solicitor for 11 months with Gadens Lawyers then approximately 3½ years with Maurice Blackburn Cashman, before returning to the Territory in August 2004 to take up a position as Industrial Officer with the Liquor, Hospitality and Miscellaneous Union (LHMU).

== Political career ==
In the 2005 Northern Territory election, Burke achieved a shock defeat of the Opposition Leader Denis Burke (no relation). Although even he had not expected to be victorious, he swept aside the incumbent member, and won what had been the CLP's safest seat with a swing of more than 20%.

Northern Territory Legislative Assembly
Years	Term	Electoral division	Party
2005–2008	10th	Brennan	Labor

On 9 August 2008, a general election for the Legislative Assembly of the Northern Territory was held, resulting in Burke losing his seat of Brennan to Peter Chandler of the CLP.

In April 2009, Burke became an Advisor to the Chief Minister of the Northern Territory, Honorable Paul Henderson.

== Personal life ==
Burke married Sharon McKenzie in August 1999, gaining a step-daughter (Leesa), and having two children (Niamh and Flynn).

Northern Territory Legislative Assembly
Preceded by Denis Burke	Member for Brennan; 2005 – 2008	Succeeded by Peter Chandler
