= Ted Warren =

Australian politician

Edward John Warren is an Australian former politician. He was the Labor member for Goyder in the Northern Territory Legislative Assembly from 2005 to 2008.

Northern Territory Legislative Assembly
Years	Term	Electoral division	Party
2005–2008	10th	Goyder	Labor

Warren was a geotechnical and geological engineering consultant before his entry into politics, working in both the Northern Territory and Papua New Guinea. His first foray into politics was an unsuccessful run for the seat of Jingili in 1984. Warren was elected as part of Labor's 2005 landslide win after Country Liberal incumbent Peter Maley was disendorsed just a month before the election. However, a redistribution ahead of the 2008 election erased Warren's majority and made Goyder a notional CLP seat. He was easily defeated in 2008 by the CLP's Kezia Purick.

Northern Territory Legislative Assembly
Preceded by Peter Maley	Member for Goyder; 2005–2008	Succeeded by Kezia Purick
