= Leader of the Opposition (Northern Territory) =

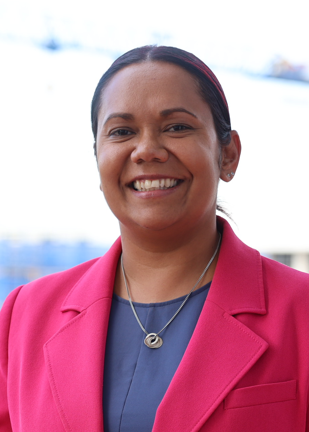
Selena Uibo, 2025

The leader of the opposition is an official role usually occupied by the leader of the second largest party in the Northern Territory Legislative Assembly. In the event that party wins an election, the leader of the opposition will most likely become the chief minister.

While the Legislative Assembly was created in 1974, there was no parliamentary opposition for the first three-year term, as every seat was held by the government, with the exception of two that were won by independents.

Even though the leader of the government between 1974 and 1978 was known as majority leader, the position of leader of the opposition was always named as such for the leader of the opposing party and never as minority leader.

#	Opposition Leader	Party	Dates in Opposition
1	Jon Isaacs	Labor	21 September 1977 – 1 November 1981
2	Bob Collins	Labor	2 November 1981 – 18 August 1986
3	Terry Smith	Labor	19 August 1986 – 1 November 1990
4	Brian Ede	Labor	2 November 1990 – 9 April 1996
5	Maggie Hickey	Labor	16 April 1996 – 2 February 1999
6	Clare Martin	Labor	3 February 1999 – 26 August 2001
7	Denis Burke	Country Liberal	28 August 2001 – 14 November 2003
8	Terry Mills	Country Liberal	15 November 2003 – 4 February 2005
(7)	Denis Burke	Country Liberal	7 February 2005 – 17 June 2005
9	Jodeen Carney	Country Liberal	29 June 2005 – 28 January 2008
(8)	Terry Mills	Country Liberal	29 January 2008 – 29 August 2012
10	Delia Lawrie	Labor	29 August 2012 – 20 April 2015
11	Michael Gunner	Labor	20 April 2015 – 31 August 2016
12	Gary Higgins	Country Liberal	2 September 2016 – 1 February 2020
13	Lia Finocchiaro	Country Liberal	1 February 2020 – 18 March 2020
	Disputed		18 March 2020 – 24 March 2020
(13)	Lia Finocchiaro	Country Liberal	24 March 2020 – 28 August 2024
14	Selena Uibo	Labor	3 September 2024 – present

== See also ==
- 2020 Northern Territory opposition leadership dispute
