= Len Kiely =

Australian politician

Leonard Francis Kiely (born 1954) is a former Australian politician. He was the Labor member for Sanderson in the Northern Territory Legislative Assembly from 2001 to 2008.

Northern Territory Legislative Assembly
Years	Term	Electoral division	Party
2001–2005	9th	Sanderson	Labor
2005–2008	10th	Sanderson	Labor

Kiely was first elected in 2001 following the retirement of CLP member Daryl Manzie. After his re-election in 2005 he was appointed Deputy Speaker, but stood down in July 2006 after a sexual harassment incident. He was appointed Minister for Natural Resources, Environment and Heritage and Minister for Parks and Wildlife in November 2007. In 2008 he was defeated by CLP candidate Peter Styles.

Northern Territory Legislative Assembly
Preceded by Daryl Manzie	Member for Sanderson; 2001–2008	Succeeded by Peter Styles
