= Electoral division of Brennan =

Coordinates: 12°29′55″S 130°59′34″E

Brennan Northern Territory—Legislative Assembly
- Interactive map of boundaries as of the 2024 election
- Territory: Northern Territory
- Created: 1990
- MP: Marie-Clare Boothby
- Party: Country Liberal
- Namesake: Harold Brennan
- Electors: 6,405 (2026)
- Area: 5 km^{2} (1.9 sq mi)
- Demographic: Urban
Electorates around Brennan:
Drysdale	Spillett	Spillett
Blain	Brennan	Goyder
Daly	Daly	Goyder

Brennan is an electoral division of the Legislative Assembly in Australia's Northern Territory. It was first created in 1990 as a replacement for the abolished seat of Ludmilla, and derives its name from Harold "Tiger" Brennan, a former member of the Legislative Council and Mayor of Darwin. Brennan includes both rural and urban areas, covering an area of 5 km^{2} and encompassing the Palmerston suburbs of Bakewell, Gunn, Farrar, as well as part of Rosebery. There were 6,405 people enrolled in the electorate as of July 2026.

Palmerston has long been one of the heartlands of the Country Liberal Party. Indeed, until 2005, the Labor Party had never come close to winning a Palmerston-based seat in the history of the Assembly. However, Brennan is located in what had long been reckoned as a particularly conservative area even by Palmerston standards, and it was the CLP's safest seat after the 2001 election. Denis Burke, who served as Chief Minister of the Northern Territory from 1999 to 2001 and had just been reelected as Opposition Leader a few months before the election, was not expected to have any difficulty holding the seat in the foreseeable future. However, in a shock result that had not been predicted by any prominent commentator, much less either candidate, Brennan fell to the ALP candidate, James Burke, at the 2005 election—only the second time that a major-party leader in the Northern Territory had been toppled in his own electorate.

Burke's victory was short-lived, as Peter Chandler regained the seat for the CLP at the 2008 election. Chandler picked up a massive swing in 2012, seemingly reverting Brennan to its traditional status as a safe CLP seat. However, Chandler was swept out four years later by Labor's Tony Sievers amid the CLP's collapse in Palmerston. Sievers in turn narrowly lost his seat to the CLP's Marie-Clare Boothby in 2020.

== Members for Brennan ==
Member	Party	Term
Max Ortmann	Country Liberal	1990–1994
Max Ortmann	Independent	1994–1994
Denis Burke	Country Liberal	1994–2005
James Burke	Labor	2005–2008
Peter Chandler	Country Liberal	2008–2016
Tony Sievers	Labor	2016–2020
Marie-Clare Boothby	Country Liberal	2020–present

== Election results ==
2024 Northern Territory general election: Brennan
Party	Candidate	Votes	%	±%
Country Liberal	Marie-Clare Boothby	3,529	73.9	+31.5
Labor	Tony Sievers	1,246	26.1	−13.8
Total formal votes		4,775	97.3	+0.2
Informal votes		132	2.7	−0.2
Turnout		4,907	78.7	
Country Liberal hold		Swing	+20.9	
