= Clare Martin =

Australian politician

The Honourable Clare Martin AO
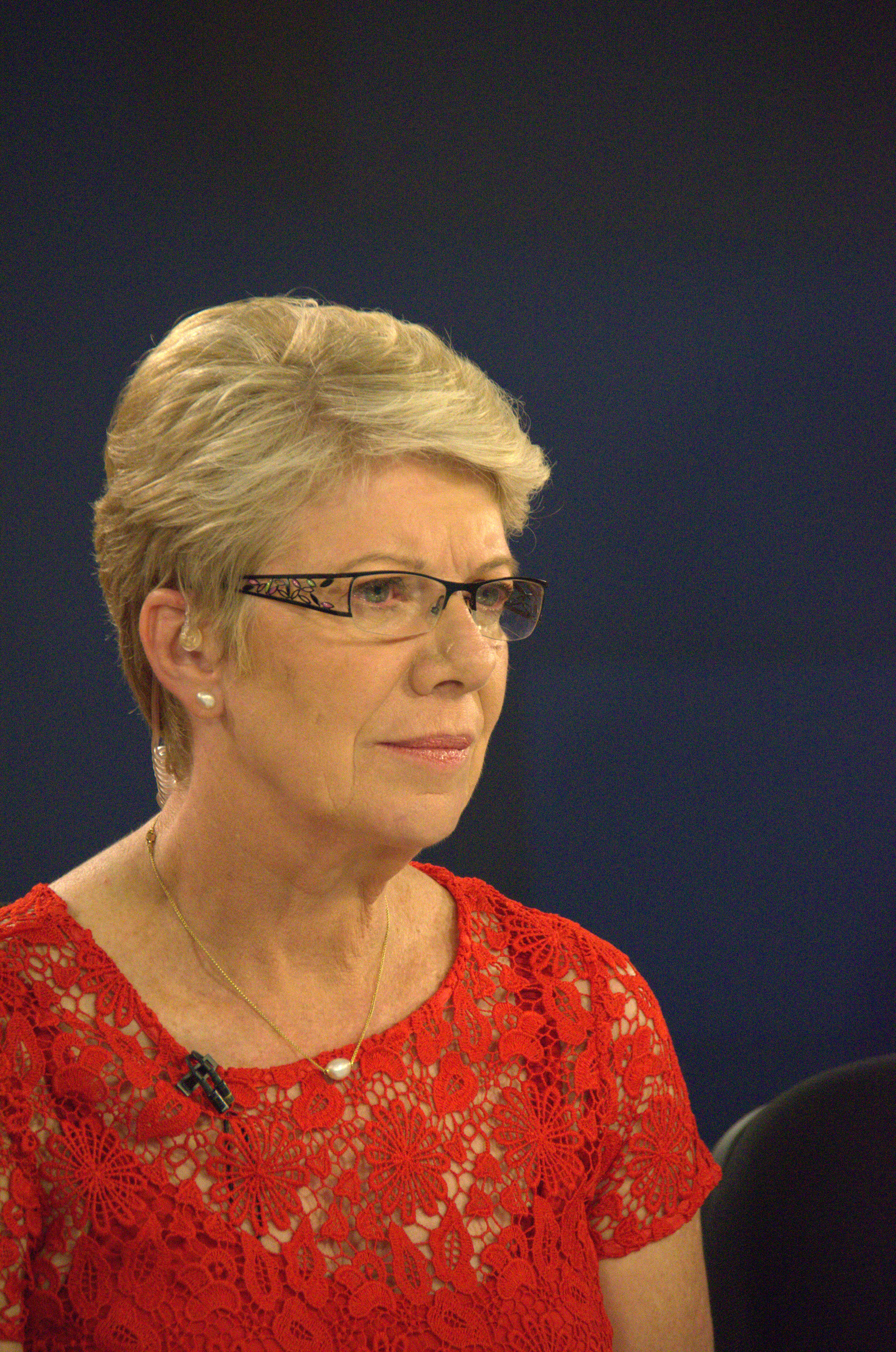
- Martin in 2012

7th Chief Minister of the Northern Territory
- In office 27 August 2001 – 26 November 2007
- Deputy: Syd Stirling
- Preceded by: Denis Burke
- Succeeded by: Paul Henderson

Member of the Northern Territory Legislative Assembly for Fannie Bay
- In office 17 June 1995 – 9 August 2008
- Preceded by: Marshall Perron
- Succeeded by: Michael Gunner

Personal details
- Born: Clare Majella Martin; 15 June 1952 (age 74) Lindfield, New South Wales
- Party: Labor Party
- Spouse: David Alderman
- Children: 2
- Education: University of Sydney
- Profession: Journalist
- Cabinet: Martin Ministry

Clare Majella Martin (born 15 June 1952) is a former Australian journalist and politician. She was elected to the Northern Territory Legislative Assembly in a shock by-election win in 1995. She was appointed Opposition Leader in 1999, and won a surprise victory at the 2001 territory election, becoming the first Labor Party (ALP) and first female Chief Minister of the Northern Territory. At the 2005 election, she led Territory Labor to the second-largest majority government in the history of the Territory, before resigning as Chief Minister on 26 November 2007.

== Early life ==
Martin was one of ten children. Her parents were Catholics and Democratic Labor Party supporters. Her uncle, Kevin Cairns, was a Liberal minister and MP in the McMahon government, but the family was not inclined towards his conservative politics. Martin's ancestry includes the Coughlin family, which also had NSW's first female statistician and the noted test cricketer Victor Trumper. The family was originally from County Offaly, Ireland, until the Cromwell invasion, then left County Cork in the 1850s just after the Great Famine. After attending Loreto Normanhurst, Martin graduated from the University of Sydney in 1975 with a Bachelor of Arts degree, in which her major study was Music.

== Pre-political career ==
Having spent time in London and other overseas cities, she began working as a typist for the Australian Broadcasting Corporation in Sydney in 1978. In 1979, she became a trainee reporter. After several years, she began to take an interest in presenting, but was told that she would not be given a position in Sydney unless she had experience elsewhere. In February 1983, Martin was then offered a six-month position presenting a morning radio show in Darwin for the ABC Radio station 5DR.

She had little intention of staying there, and briefly returned to Canberra in May 1983, before being offered a job in Sydney. However, at the same time, Martin's partner was offered a partner's position at the law firm he had worked in Darwin. He liked living in Darwin and was keen to take up the position, so Martin agreed to decline the Sydney job and return to Darwin in May 1985 where she gained another position on an ABC Radio morning show.

In 1986, Martin made the move to television, as the presenter of The 7.30 Report until 1988. After returning from long service leave where she cared for her two young children, Martin returned to work in 1990 to work on ABC Radio's morning program.

== Political career ==
Northern Territory Legislative Assembly
Years	Term	Electoral division	Party
1995–1997	7th	Fannie Bay	Labor
1997–2001	8th	Fannie Bay	Labor
2001–2005	9th	Fannie Bay	Labor
2005–2008	10th	Fannie Bay	Labor

Martin had been interested in political journalism for some years, although she was not a member of any party, believing that party affiliation compromises journalistic integrity. In 1994, she was approached to contest the Darwin Legislative Assembly seat of Casuarina for the Labor Party at the 1994 election. However, she was defeated by Country Liberal Party candidate Peter Adamson. She soon resigned from the party and returned to journalism, but when former CLP Chief Minister Marshall Perron resigned from his Darwin seat of Fannie Bay, Martin opted to contest the ensuing by-election as the Labor candidate. Fannie Bay, like most Darwin electorates, had been a CLP stronghold; Perron held it with a majority of 8 percent. However, in a considerable upset, Martin went on to win the seat by 69 votes, becoming one of only two ALP MLAs in Darwin.

Martin worked hard to retain her seat at the 1997 election, and was successful, holding Fannie Bay despite a heavy defeat for the ALP. She subsequently served as Shadow Minister for Lands under then leader Maggie Hickey. When Hickey unexpectedly resigned in February 1999, Martin was in a position to succeed her, and was soon elected party leader, and hence Opposition Leader. She soon emerged as a vocal critic of the Burke government's policy of mandatory sentencing, and began preparing the ALP for the next election, which was then two years away.

== Term as Chief Minister ==
Martin faced her first electoral test as leader at the 2001 election. At the time, the Country Liberal Party had held office for 27 years, and Labor had never come particularly close to government. Indeed, it had never managed to win more than nine seats at any election. However, the ALP was coming off a particularly successful eighteen months, and Martin ran a skilled campaign. She was also able to take advantage of a number of gaffes made by then-Chief Minister Denis Burke, such as the decision to preference One Nation over the ALP – which lost the CLP a number of votes in crucial Darwin seats. The election also came during a bad time for the federal Coalition government, which was under fire for introducing a GST after previously vowing not to do so.

Despite this, most commentators were predicting the CLP would be returned for a ninth term in government, albeit with a reduced majority. However, in a shock result, Labor scored an eight-seat swing, achieving majority government by one seat. It did so on the strength of an unexpected Labor wave in Darwin. Labor had gone into the election holding only two seats in the capital—those of Martin and Paul Henderson—and had never held more than two seats in Darwin at any time. In the 2001 election, however, Labor took all but one seat in Darwin, including all seven seats in the northern part of the city. Darwin's northern suburbs are somewhat more diverse than the rest of the city. In the process, they ousted four sitting MLAs; Labor had not unseated a CLP incumbent since 1980. Although the CLP won a bare majority of the two-party vote, Labor's gains in Darwin were enough to make Martin the first ALP and first female Chief Minister in the history of the Northern Territory. Martin herself was reelected with a healthy swing of 9.2 percent in Fannie Bay, turning it into a safe Labor seat in one stroke.

As Chief Minister, Martin immediately set about making changes, repealing the territory's controversial mandatory sentencing laws, and introducing freedom of information legislation, which had been neglected during the CLP's 27-year rule.

=== Aboriginal issues ===
Although Martin appointed Aboriginal Territorians to her cabinet, she has been criticised for not improving the lot of her Aboriginal constituents, who on average have a life expectancy well below that of white Australians. A respected commentator in The Bulletin suggested that she had gone slow on Aboriginal issues because she feared a white backlash that could have resulted in her government being toppled.

The life expectancy of the Northern Territory's Aboriginal citizens did not increase markedly during Martin's administration. Alcohol abuse continued to be a major issue in Aboriginal communities and third-world diseases like trachoma could be seen in remote Aboriginal townships. However, in 2006, Martin rejected accusations by John Howard and Federal Indigenous Affairs Minister, Mal Brough, that her government had been underfunding Aboriginal communities. A summit between the federal and territory governments was proposed by Mal Brough in May 2006, but this was snubbed by Martin.

Martin was critical of the Federal Government's intervention in Aboriginal communities as announced in 2007. She opposed certain aspects of the intervention such as removal of the permit system. In response, the Federal Government rejected the Territory's argument, saying it was essential to remove artificial barriers to Aboriginal townships that prevent the measures needed to improve living conditions for Indigenous children

=== Achievements ===
In the longer term, she oversaw the completion of the Adelaide-Darwin railway, which had begun under the Burke government, and vowed to resurrect the stalled statehood movement. She also managed to markedly boost the ALP's standing among the electorate, as seen in the 2003 Katherine by-election, which saw a major swing to the party.

By 2005, the Northern Territory, under Martin's leadership, had achieved the following:

- the highest economic growth in Australia at 7.2 per cent
- the lowest small business taxes
- record population growth
- the highest building approval rates
- surging house prices and record levels of home ownership.
- Property crime almost halved
- Approval for $1 billion development of Darwin wharf precinct

As Chief Minister, Martin led the ALP to the 2005 election, which was their first as an incumbent government in the Territory. Martin campaigned largely on law and order issues. It was predicted that the ALP would win a relatively narrow victory. However, in a result that had not been predicted by any commentators or even the most optimistic Labor observers, Martin led the ALP to a smashing victory. The final result gave 19 seats to the ALP, 4 to the opposition CLP and 2 to independents. The ALP won six seats from the CLP, four of which they had never won before in any election. Two of them were in Palmerston, an area where Labor had never previously come close to winning. In the most unexpected victory of all, the ALP even managed to unseat the Opposition Leader and former Chief Minister, Burke, in his own Palmerston-area electorate. Labor won the second-largest majority government in the history of the Territory, bettered only by the CLP's near-sweep of the Legislative Assembly at the first elections, in 1974.

On 10 September 2007, Queensland Premier Peter Beattie announced he would leave politics that week. This left Martin as Labor's longest-serving current state or territory leader, and as the longest-serving state or territory head of government in Australia, until she herself announced her resignation on 26 November 2007.

=== Resignation ===
On 26 November 2007, Clare Martin and her deputy Syd Stirling announced their resignations at a media conference in Darwin. Education Minister Paul Henderson was elected as the new leader and Chief Minister by the ALP caucus.

== Post-political career ==
In 2008, Martin became chief executive officer of the Australian Council of Social Service, based in Sydney. In August 2010 she returned to the Northern Territory to become a Professorial Fellow in the Public and Social Policy Research Institute at Charles Darwin University.

In June 2019, she was appointed as an Officer of the Order of Australia for distinguished service to the people and Legislative Assembly of the Northern Territory, and as a community advocate.

== See also ==
- List of female heads of government in Australia

Northern Territory Legislative Assembly
Preceded by Marshall Perron	Member for Fannie Bay; 1995–2008	Succeeded by Michael Gunner
Political offices
Preceded by Maggie Hickey	Opposition Leader of the Northern Territory; 1999–2001	Succeeded by Denis Burke
Preceded by Denis Burke	Chief Minister of the Northern Territory; 2001–2007	Succeeded by Paul Henderson
