= Electoral division of Goyder =

Coordinates: 12°34′31″S 131°6′8″E

Goyder Northern Territory—Legislative Assembly
- Interactive map of boundaries as of the 2024 election
- Territory: Northern Territory
- Created: 1990
- MP: Andrew Mackay
- Party: Country Liberal Party
- Namesake: George Goyder
- Electors: 6,418 (2026)
- Area: 9,770 km^{2} (3,772.2 sq mi)
- Demographic: Rural
Electorates around Goyder:
Beagle Gulf; Nelson	Beagle Gulf	Beagle Gulf
Daly	Goyder	Arafura
Daly	Daly	Arafura

Goyder is an electoral division of the Legislative Assembly in Australia's Northern Territory. It was first created in 1990, and is named after George Goyder, the South Australian surveyor responsible for carrying out the first freehold surveys in the area. Goyder encompasses large rural areas south of Darwin, covering 9,770 km², and taking in the towns of Bees Creek, Cox Peninsula, Virginia, Marlows Lagoon and parts of Berry Springs and Humpty Doo. When first created, it was even larger extending south to Pine Creek and east to Jabiru and the whole of Kakadu National Park. There were 6,418 people enrolled in the electorate as of July 2026.

Goyder was considered a staunch conservative electorate and a very safe seat for the Country Liberal Party for most of its history. It was created in 1990, and the endorsed CLP candidate, Terry McCarthy, defeated renegade former leader Ian Tuxworth to become the first member. McCarthy was handily reelected twice, serving two stints as Speaker. He retired in 2001, and Peter Maley easily retained the seat for the CLP.

However, in 2005, a string of factors caused a massive swing to the Labor Party—sparking memories of what had happened in the safe ALP seat of MacDonnell in 1997. In May, barely over a month before the election, the CLP expelled Maley over disagreements and a later dropped domestic violence order. While he decided not to run as an independent, he harshly criticised the CLP and urged his supporters to vote for Labor. In addition, prominent Litchfield Shire President Mary Walshe ran as an independent, and while she did not poll anywhere well as she had hoped, she directed her preferences to Labor candidate Ted Warren. The campaign of the CLP candidate, Keith Phasey, was further harmed when the media reported that his wife had been questioned by a Western Australian inquiry into the deaths of several cancer patients, leading to a police raid on the home eight days before the election, although the police had been careful to distance Phasey himself from the investigation. Finally, this came against the backdrop of a very large swing to the ALP across the Territory, which also resulted in Opposition Leader Denis Burke losing his very safe seat of Brennan.

In the end, the combination of factors saw the previously very safe CLP seat delivered to the ALP, with Warren narrowly defeating Phasey and becoming the first ALP member in the electorate's history. The final result was not known for several days after the election. However, a redistribution ahead of the 2008 election made the seat notionally CLP, and the seat reverted to form when Warren was soundly defeated by Kezia Purick of the CLP. Purick consolidated the CLP hold on the seat in 2012, and was elected as Speaker. She left the CLP to become an independent in July 2015, and easily retained the seat as an independent in 2016 and 2020. In 2024, on her retirement, CLP candidate Andrew Mackay won the seat.

== Members for Goyder ==
Member	Party	Term
Terry McCarthy	Country Liberal	1990–2001
Peter Maley	Country Liberal	2001–2005
Peter Maley	Independent	2005
Ted Warren	Labor	2005–2008
Kezia Purick	Country Liberal	2008–2015
Kezia Purick	Independent	2015–2024
Andrew Mackay	Country Liberal	2024–present

== Election results ==
2024 Northern Territory general election: Goyder
Party	Candidate	Votes	%	±%
Country Liberal	Andrew Mackay	2,846	56.2	+28.8
Independent	Belinda Kolstad	1,049	20.7	+20.7
Labor	Sandy Griffin	691	13.7	+1.1
Independent	Mathew Salter	367	7.2	+7.2
Independent	Trevor Jenkins	109	2.2	+0.8
Total formal votes		5,062	96.7	+0.5
Informal votes		175	3.3	−0.6
Turnout		5,237	83.0	
Two-party-preferred result (Note: Estimated two-party-preferred count by Antony Green.)
Country Liberal	Andrew Mackay	3,819	75.4	+11.0
Labor	Sandy Griffin	1,245	24.6	−11.0
Two-candidate-preferred result
Country Liberal	Andrew Mackay	3,172	62.7	+19.4
Independent	Belinda Kolstad	1,890	37.3	+37.3
Country Liberal gain from Independent		Swing	+19.4	
