= Territory Labor Party =

Northern Territory branch of the Australian Labor Party

Territory Labor Party Australian Labor Party (Northern Territory Branch)
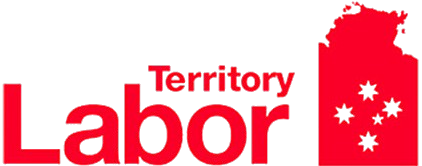
- Abbreviation: NTALP; NTL; TL; ALP
- Leader: Selena Uibo
- Deputy Leader: Dheran Young
- Secretary: Karlee Dalton
- President: Erina Early
- Founded: August 1967; 59 years ago
- Headquarters: 38 Woods Street, Darwin, Northern Territory
- Youth wing: Northern Territory Young Labor
- Ideology: Social democracy
- Political position: Centre-left
- National affiliation: Australian Labor
- Union affiliate: Unions NT
- Colours: Red
- Legislative Assembly: 6 / 25
- House of Representatives: 2 / 2 (NT seats)
- Senate: 1 / 2 (NT seats)

Website
- territorylabor.com.au

The Territory Labor Party, (Note: alternatively referred to as the NT Labor Party, or more simply as NT Labor) officially known as the Australian Labor Party (Northern Territory Branch) and commonly referred to simply as Territory Labor, is the Northern Territory branch of the Australian Labor Party. It has been led by Selena Uibo, the first Aboriginal woman to lead a major political party in Australia, since 3 September 2024.

== History ==
The first Labor candidate from the Northern Territory—which was then represented by the Northern Territory seat in the South Australian House of Assembly—was Pine Creek miner and former City of Adelaide alderman James Robertson in 1905. The first Labor MP was Thomas Crush, who was elected at a 1908 by-election and accepted into the South Australian Labor caucus despite not having signed the Labor pledge. He was re-elected in 1910, and served until the Northern Territory formally separated from South Australia in 1911, resulting in the loss of the seat in state parliament. A non-voting federal seat in the Australian House of Representatives, the Division of Northern Territory, was established for the 1922 election, and was won by independent candidate and former union leader Harold George Nelson, who joined the Labor caucus after the election.

In March 1928, a general meeting of the North Australian Workers Union resolved to establish a Northern Territory branch of the Labor Party and elected an interim executive. In July 1928, it was reported that the federal secretary had requested that the South Australian branch instead form a Darwin branch. It was reported in October 1928 that affiliation with the South Australian branch had been granted, and that the South Australian state executive had re-endorsed Nelson to contest the 1929 election. An Alice Springs branch was established in 1947. The Northern Territory branch was upgraded to receive the status of a state branch in August 1967.

The Northern Territory Legislative Council was established in 1947 as a partly elected representative body with limited powers, with the Labor Party endorsing candidates from the first election. Labor members of the Legislative Council included Tom Bell, Eric Marks, Charles Orr, Len Purkiss, Tom Ronan, and Richard Ward

In 1974, the Legislative Council was replaced by the fully elected Northern Territory Legislative Assembly in preparation for self-governance. However, the 1974 election was disastrous for Labor, which failed to win a single seat. The party recovered to some extent at the 1977 election, winning six seats. However, over the next 24 years, it never came particularly close to winning government; it never won more than nine seats at an election and never held more than two seats in the Darwin/Palmerston area at any time.

As a result, Labor remained in opposition until 2001 election, when Clare Martin led the party to government for the first time primarily on the strength of a near-sweep of Darwin, including all seven seats in the northern part of the capital. Four years later, in 2005, Martin led Labor to one of the most comprehensive victories on record at the state or territory level, winning 19 out of 25 seats, the second-largest majority government in the history of the Territory. Martin retired in 2007 and was succeeded by Paul Henderson. Under Henderson, Labor won a third term with a reduced majority in 2008 before being defeated by the CLP at the 2012 election. After one term in opposition, Labor returned to power at the 2016 election. Under Michael Gunner, Labor won a landslide almost as massive as the one it won in 2005, with 18 seats, the third-largest majority government in the history of the Territory. Gunner was reelected in 2020 with a somewhat reduced mandate of 14 seats.

The 2024 election saw Territory Labor suffer its second-worst result since the establishment of self-government (second to only the first Northern Territory election in 1974, when Labor won no seats), as well as Labor's lowest primary vote share in the history of the Northern Territory. Party leader Eva Lawler lost her seat to the CLP, becoming the third Chief Minister and the first Labor Chief Minister to do so. Selena Uibo was subsequently elected unopposed as Leader of Territory Labor and Leader of the Opposition in the Northern Territory on 3 September 2024, the first Aboriginal woman to lead a major political party in Australia.

== Leaders ==
- Richard Ward (1974)
- Jon Isaacs (September 1977 – November 1981)
- Bob Collins (November 1981 – August 1986)
- Terry Smith (August 1986 – November 1990)
- Brian Ede (November 1990 – April 1996)
- Maggie Hickey (April 1996 – February 1999)
- Clare Martin (February 1999 – November 2007)
- Paul Henderson (November 2007 – August 2012)
- Delia Lawrie (August 2012 – April 2015)
- Michael Gunner (April 2015 – May 2022)
- Natasha Fyles (May 2022 – December 2023)
- Eva Lawler (December 2023 – September 2024)
- Selena Uibo (September 2024 – present)

== Election results ==
=== Legislative Assembly ===
Election	Leader	Votes	%	Seats	+/–	Position	Status
1974	Richard Ward	8,508	30.5	0 / 19	0	▲2nd	No seats
1977	Jon Isaacs	12,165	38.2	6 / 19	▲6	2nd	Opposition
1980	Jon Isaacs	15,818	39.4	7 / 19	▲1	2nd	Opposition
1983	Bob Collins	17,505	35.6	6 / 25	▼1	2nd	Opposition
1987	Terry Smith	18,307	36.0	6 / 25	0	2nd	Opposition
1990	Terry Smith	23,827	36.6	9 / 25	▲3	2nd	Opposition
1994	Brian Ede	30,507	41.4	7 / 25	▼2	2nd	Opposition
1997	Maggie Hickey	29,365	38.5	7 / 25	0	2nd	Opposition
2001	Clare Martin	33,038	40.6	13 / 25	▲6	▲1st	Majority
2005	Clare Martin	44,822	51.9	19 / 25	▲6	1st	Majority
2008	Paul Henderson	34,557	43.2	13 / 25	▼6	1st	Majority
2012	Paul Henderson	33,594	36.5	8 / 25	▼5	▼2nd	Opposition
2016	Michael Gunner	41,476	42.2	18 / 25	▲11	▲1st	Majority
2020	Michael Gunner	40,291	39.4	14 / 25	▼4	1st	Majority
2024	Eva Lawler	29,292	28.8	4 / 25	▼10	▼2nd	Opposition
