= Results of the 1977 Northern Territory general election =

Northern Territory general election, 13 August 1977 Legislative Assembly << 1974–1980 >>
Enrolled voters	43,284				
Votes cast	32,861		Turnout	75.9%	+0.5%
Informal votes	1,044		Informal	3.2%	–1.9%
Summary of votes by party
Party	Primary votes	%	Swing	Seats	Change
Country Liberal	12,769	40.1%	–8.9%	12	– 5
Labor	12,165	38.2%	+7.7%	6	+ 6
Independent	3,718	11.7%	–8.8%	1	– 1
Progress	3,104	9.8%	+9.8%	0	± 0
Communist	61	0.2%	+0.2%	0	± 0
Total	31,817			19	

This is a list of electoral division results for the Northern Territory 1977 General Election in Australia.

== Results by electoral division ==
=== Alice Springs ===
1977 Northern Territory general election: Alice Springs
Party	Candidate	Votes	%	±%
Country Liberal	Rod Oliver	929	51.1	−21.1
Labor	Rosalie McDonald	644	35.4	+14.8
Progress	Brian Evans	245	13.5	+13.5
Total formal votes		1,818	96.9	+2.4
Informal votes		59	3.1	−2.4
Turnout		1,877	73.0	−2.7
Country Liberal hold		Swing	−21.1	

- Preferences were not distributed.

=== Arnhem ===
1977 Northern Territory general election: Arnhem
Party	Candidate	Votes	%	±%
Labor	Bob Collins	812	63.4	+30.3
Country Liberal	Rupert Kentish	370	28.9	−38.0
Progress	Phillip Brain	98	7.7	+7.7
Total formal votes		1,280	94.3	+4.2
Informal votes		77	5.7	−4.2
Turnout		1,357	66.1	+10.6
Labor gain from Country Liberal		Swing	+30.3	

- Preferences were not distributed.

=== Barkly ===
1977 Northern Territory general election: Barkly
Party	Candidate	Votes	%	±%
Country Liberal	Ian Tuxworth	603	44.5	−8.0
Labor	Jean Havnen	365	26.9	−20.1
Progress	Neville Andrews	233	17.2	+17.2
Independent	Margaret Conway; Billy Foster	154	11.4	+11.4
Total formal votes		1,355	94.8	+0.3
Informal votes		74	5.2	−0.3
Turnout		1,429	68.2	+0.5
Two-party-preferred result
Country Liberal	Ian Tuxworth	816	60.2	+7.2
Labor	Jean Havnen	539	39.8	−7.2
Country Liberal hold		Swing	+7.2	

- The number of votes each independent candidate received is unknown.

=== Casuarina ===
1977 Northern Territory general election: Casuarina
Party	Candidate	Votes	%	±%
Labor	Dennis Bree	941	46.7	+11.8
Country Liberal	Nick Dondas	927	46.0	+4.1
Progress	Robert Hoey	149	7.4	+7.4
Total formal votes		2,017	98.2	+1.7
Informal votes		38	1.8	−1.7
Turnout		2,055	84.2	−4.8
Two-party-preferred result
Country Liberal	Nick Dondas	1,022	50.7	−2.8
Labor	Dennis Bree	995	49.3	+2.8
Country Liberal hold		Swing	−2.8	

=== Elsey ===
1977 Northern Territory general election: Elsey
Party	Candidate	Votes	%	±%
Country Liberal	Les MacFarlane	617	44.2	−19.3
Independent	Davis Daniels; Patricia Davies	696	49.8	+49.8
Progress	Deidre Killen	84	6.0	+6.0
Total formal votes		1,397	98.2	+2.7
Informal votes		26	1.8	−2.7
Turnout		1,423	69.0	−1.0
Two-candidate-preferred result
Country Liberal	Les MacFarlane	726	52.0	−11.5
Independent		671	48.0	+48.0
Country Liberal hold		Swing	−11.5	

- The number of votes each individual Independent received is unknown.
- The independent candidate that came second on preferences is unknown.

=== Fannie Bay ===
1977 Northern Territory general election: Fannie Bay
Party	Candidate	Votes	%	±%
Labor	Pam O'Neil	752	42.2	+10.6
Country Liberal	Grant Tambling	622	34.9	−11.6
Independent	William Fisher	318	17.8	+17.8
Progress	Edward Osgood	92	5.2	+5.2
Total formal votes		1,784	97.9	+2.3
Informal votes		38	2.1	−2.3
Turnout		1,822	82.4	+3.9
Two-party-preferred result
Labor	Pam O'Neil	912	51.1	
Country Liberal	Grant Tambling	872	48.9	
Labor gain from Country Liberal		Swing		

=== Gillen ===
1977 Northern Territory general election: Gillen
Party	Candidate	Votes	%	±%
Country Liberal	Jim Robertson	1,035	49.9	−15.8
Labor	John Thomas	808	39.0	+4.7
Progress	Peter Johncock	231	11.1	+11.1
Total formal votes		2,074	97.6	+7.4
Informal votes		50	2.4	−7.4
Turnout		2,124	79.9	−2.6
Two-party-preferred result
Country Liberal	Jim Robertson	1,216	58.6	−7.1
Labor	John Thomas	858	41.4	+7.1
Country Liberal hold		Swing	−7.1	

=== Jingili ===
1977 Northern Territory general election: Jingili
Party	Candidate	Votes	%	±%
Labor	Diana Rickard	662	36.4	−11.8
Country Liberal	Paul Everingham	639	35.1	−16.7
Progress	David Cooper	338	18.6	+18.6
Independent	John McCormack; George Tarasidis	182	10.0	+10.0
Total formal votes		1,821	97.2	+3.1
Informal votes		52	2.8	−3.1
Turnout		1,873	83.8	+0.9
Two-party-preferred result
Country Liberal	Paul Everingham	972	53.4	+1.6
Labor	Diana Rickard	849	46.6	−1.6
Country Liberal hold		Swing	+1.6	

=== Ludmilla ===
1977 Northern Territory general election: Ludmilla
Party	Candidate	Votes	%	±%
Country Liberal	Roger Steele	889	46.9	+10.5
Labor	Christopher Draffin	745	39.3	+10.5
Progress	Terry Johnson	262	13.8	+13.8
Total formal votes		1,896	97.7	+2.5
Informal votes		45	2.3	−2.5
Turnout		1,941	79.1	−1.3
Two-party-preferred result
Country Liberal	Roger Steele	1,053	55.5	−1.8
Labor	Christopher Draffin	843	44.5	+1.8
Country Liberal hold		Swing	−1.8	

=== MacDonnell ===
1977 Northern Territory general election: MacDonnell
Party	Candidate	Votes	%	±%
Labor	Neville Perkins	886	60.8	+21.4
Country Liberal	Dave Pollock	485	33.3	−20.1
Progress	Mark Fidler	86	5.9	+5.9
Total formal votes		1,457	95.7	+3.0
Informal votes		65	4.3	−3.0
Turnout		1,522	61.2	−4.0
Labor gain from Country Liberal		Swing	+21.4	

- Preferences were not distributed.

=== Millner ===
1977 Northern Territory general election: Millner
Party	Candidate	Votes	%	±%
Labor	Jon Isaacs	951	57.6	+12.2
Country Liberal	Roger Ryan	548	33.2	−30.5
Progress	Elva Pearce	151	9.2	+9.2
Total formal votes		1,650	98.0	−2.7
Informal votes		34	2.0	+2.7
Turnout		1,684	81.6	+2.6
Labor gain from Country Liberal		Swing	+12.2	

- Preferences were not distributed.

=== Nhulunbuy ===
1977 Northern Territory general election: Nhulunbuy
Party	Candidate	Votes	%	±%
Country Liberal	Milton Ballantyne	874	56.1	+7.8
Labor	Denise Fincham	642	41.2	−0.1
Progress	Jacob De Vries	43	2.8	+2.8
Total formal votes		1,559	97.4	+1.0
Informal votes		41	2.6	−1.0
Turnout		1,600	75.4	+0.6
Country Liberal hold		Swing	+0.8	

- Preferences were not distributed.

=== Nightcliff ===
1977 Northern Territory general election: Nightcliff
Party	Candidate	Votes	%	±%
Independent	Dawn Lawrie	1,110	61.9	+19.8
Country Liberal	Ronald Nobbs	455	25.4	−12.1
Progress	Uldis Blums	228	12.7	+12.7
Total formal votes		1,793	98.0	+1.1
Informal votes		37	2.0	−1.1
Turnout		1,830	80.5	+1.6
Independent hold		Swing	+4.2	

- Preferences were not distributed.

=== Port Darwin ===
1977 Northern Territory general election: Port Darwin
Party	Candidate	Votes	%	±%
Country Liberal	Tom Harris	535	32.8	+2.8
Labor	Michael Scott	448	27.5	−2.2
Independent	Ron Withnall	440	27.3	−7.4
Progress	Ian Smith	146	9.0	+9.0
Communist	Brian Manning	61	3.8	+3.8
Total formal votes		1,610	97.7	+1.0
Informal votes		38	2.3	−1.0
Turnout		1,648	74.7	−0.8
Two-party-preferred result
Country Liberal	Tom Harris	984	60.5	+13.8
Labor	Michael Scott	626	38.4	+38.4
Country Liberal gain from Independent		Swing	+13.8	

=== Sanderson ===
1977 Northern Territory general election: Sanderson
Party	Candidate	Votes	%	±%
Labor	June D'Rozario	984	45.6	+11.1
Country Liberal	Liz Andrew	565	26.1	−15.4
Independent	Kitty Fischer; Herbert Sinclair	428	19.8	+19.8
Progress	Geoffrey Bennett	182	8.4	+8.4
Total formal votes		2,159	98.5	−1.9
Informal votes		32	1.5	+1.9
Turnout		2,191	92.4	+7.6
Two-party-preferred result
Labor	June D'Rozario	1,258	58.3	+14.8
Country Liberal	Liz Andrew	901	41.7	−14.8
Labor gain from Country Liberal		Swing	+14.8	

- The number of votes each individual Independent received is unknown.

=== Stuart ===
1977 Northern Territory general election: Stuart
Party	Candidate	Votes	%	±%
Country Liberal	Roger Vale	1,042	52.1	+4.4
Labor	Trevor Cutter	849	42.4	−13.6
Progress	Kenneth Kitto	111	5.5	+5.5
Total formal votes		2,002	96.7	+1.8
Informal votes		69	3.3	−1.8
Turnout		2,071	70.9	−0.2
Country Liberal hold		Swing	+12.7	

- Preferences were not distributed.

=== Stuart Park ===
1977 Northern Territory general election: Stuart Park
Party	Candidate	Votes	%	±%
Country Liberal	Marshall Perron	652	40.7	−7.7
Labor	Judith Muras	491	30.7	+1.9
Independent	Ernest Chin	267	16.7	+16.7
Progress	Kenneth Day	191	11.9	+11.9
Total formal votes		1,601	97.8	+2.3
Informal votes		36	2.2	−2.3
Turnout		1,637	73.9	−0.2
Two-party-preferred result
Country Liberal	Marshall Perron	902	56.3	+6.1
Labor	Judith Muras	699	43.7	+43.7
Country Liberal hold		Swing	+6.1	

=== Tiwi ===
1977 Northern Territory general election: Tiwi
Party	Candidate	Votes	%	±%
Labor	Harry Maschke; Bernard Tipiloura	495	42.5	+26.9
Country Liberal	Noel Padgham-Purich; Cyril Rioli	393	33.7	−9.7
Independent	Terrence O'Brien; Strider	143	12.3	+12.3
Progress	George Ryan	134	11.5	+11.5
Total formal votes		1,165	89.1	−5.2
Informal votes		142	10.9	+5.2
Turnout		1,307	77.5	−9.9
Two-party-preferred result
Country Liberal	Noel Padgham-Purich	612	52.5	
Labor		553	47.5	
Country Liberal hold		Swing		

- The number of votes each individual Independent, Labor and CLP candidate received is unknown.
- The Labor candidate that came second on preferences is unknown.

=== Victoria River ===
1977 Northern Territory general election: Victoria River
Party	Candidate	Votes	%	±%
Labor	Jack Doolan	690	50.0	+50.0
Country Liberal	Goff Letts	589	42.7	−27.0
Progress	Frank Favaro	100	7.3	+7.3
Total formal votes		1,379	95.8	+1.4
Informal votes		61	4.2	−1.4
Turnout		1,440	67.7	+5.1
Labor gain from Country Liberal		Swing	+50.0	

- Preferences were not distributed.

== See also ==
- 1977 Northern Territory general election
- Members of the Northern Territory Legislative Assembly, 1977–1980
