= Results of the 1974 Northern Territory general election =

Northern Territory general election, 19 October 1974 Legislative Assembly –1977 >>
Enrolled voters	39,027				
Votes cast	29,428		Turnout	75.4%	
Informal votes	1,493		Informal	5.1%	
Summary of votes by party
Party	Primary votes	%	Swing	Seats	Change
Country Liberal	13,690	49.0%		17	+ 17
Labor	8,508	30.5%		0	± 0
Independent	5,737	20.5%		2	+ 2
Total	27,935			19	

This is a list of electoral division results for the Northern Territory 1974 General Election in Australia.

== Results by electoral division ==
=== Alice Springs ===
1974 Northern Territory general election: Alice Springs
Party	Candidate	Votes	%	±%
Country Liberal	Bernie Kilgariff	1,319	72.2	
Labor	Jean Leunig	377	20.6	
Independent	Alan Gray	131	7.2	
Total formal votes		1,827	94.5	
Informal votes		106	5.5	
Turnout		1,933	75.7	
Country Liberal win		(new seat)		

- Preferences were not distributed.

=== Arnhem ===
1974 Northern Territory general election: Arnhem
Party	Candidate	Votes	%	±%
Country Liberal	Rupert Kentish	505	66.9	
Labor	Elizabeth Pearce	250	33.1	
Total formal votes		755	90.1	
Informal votes		83	9.9	
Turnout		838	55.5	
Country Liberal win		(new seat)		

=== Barkly ===
1974 Northern Territory general election: Barkly
Party	Candidate	Votes	%	±%
Country Liberal	Ian Tuxworth	558	53.0	
Labor	Eric Marks	495	47.0	
Total formal votes		1,053	94.5	
Informal votes		61	5.5	
Turnout		1,114	67.7	
Country Liberal win		(new seat)		

=== Casuarina ===
1974 Northern Territory general election: Casuarina
Party	Candidate	Votes	%	±%
Country Liberal	Nick Dondas	931	41.9	
Labor	Allan Dunstan	692	34.9	
Independent	Robert McGahey; Dudley Orr	459	23.2	
Total formal votes		1,982	96.5	
Informal votes		72	3.5	
Turnout		2,082	89.0	
Two-party-preferred result
Country Liberal	Nick Dondas	994	53.5	
Labor	Allan Dunstan	865	46.5	
Country Liberal win		(new seat)		

- The number of votes each individual Independent received is unknown.

=== Elsey ===
1974 Northern Territory general election: Elsey
Party	Candidate	Votes	%	±%
Country Liberal	Les MacFarlane	800	63.5	
Labor	Kevin Frazer	362	28.8	
Independent	Leslie James; James Martin	97	7.7	
Total formal votes		1,259	95.5	
Informal votes		60	4.5	
Turnout		1,319	70.0	
Country Liberal win		(new seat)		

- Preferences were not distributed.
- The number of votes each individual Independent received is unknown.

=== Fannie Bay ===
1974 Northern Territory general election: Fannie Bay
Party	Candidate	Votes	%	±%
Country Liberal	Grant Tambling	845	46.5	
Labor	James Bowditch	546	31.6	
Independent	John McCormack; Eleanor Fisher	378	21.9	
Total formal votes		1,684	95.6	
Informal votes		77	4.4	
Turnout		1,761	78.5	
Country Liberal win		(new seat)		

- Preferences were not distributed.
- The number of votes each individual Independent received is unknown.

=== Gillen ===
1974 Northern Territory general election: Gillen
Party	Candidate	Votes	%	±%
Country Liberal	Jim Robertson	1,128	65.7	
Labor	Peter Leunig	589	34.3	
Total formal votes		1,717	90.2	
Informal votes		187	9.8	
Turnout		1,904	82.5	
Country Liberal win		(new seat)		

=== Jingili ===
1974 Northern Territory general election: Jingili
Party	Candidate	Votes	%	±%
Country Liberal	Paul Everingham	928	51.8	
Labor	Thomas Bell	863	48.2	
Total formal votes		1,791	94.1	
Informal votes		112	5.9	
Turnout		1,903	82.9	
Country Liberal win		(new seat)		

=== Ludmilla ===
1974 Northern Territory general election: Ludmilla
Party	Candidate	Votes	%	±%
Country Liberal	Roger Steele	569	36.4	
Labor	Hazel Robertson	450	28.8	
Independent	Edward D'Ambrosio; Brian Smith; Grahame Stewart; William Sullivan	545	34.9	
Total formal votes		1,564	95.2	
Informal votes		78	4.8	
Turnout		1,642	80.4	
Two-party-preferred result
Country Liberal	Roger Steele	785	57.3	
Labor	Hazel Robertson	586	42.7	
Country Liberal win		(new seat)		

- The number of votes each individual Independent received is unknown.

=== MacDonnell ===
1974 Northern Territory general election: MacDonnell
Party	Candidate	Votes	%	±%
Country Liberal	Dave Pollock	535	53.4	
Labor	Malcolm Wolf	395	39.4	
Independent	Bruce Beaden	72	7.2	
Total formal votes		1,002	92.7	
Informal votes		79	7.3	
Turnout		1,081	65.2	
Country Liberal win		(new seat)		

- Preferences were not distributed.

=== Millner ===
1974 Northern Territory general election: Millner
Party	Candidate	Votes	%	±%
Country Liberal	Roger Ryan	711	45.4	
Labor	Jack Hunt	425	27.1	
Independent	William Forrest; John Quinn	430	27.5	
Total formal votes		1,566	95.3	
Informal votes		77	4.7	
Turnout		1,643	79.0	
Two-party-preferred result
Country Liberal	Roger Ryan	946	64.3	
Labor	Jack Hunt	526	35.7	
Country Liberal win		(new seat)		

- The number of votes each individual Independent received is unknown.

=== Nhulunbuy ===
1974 Northern Territory general election: Nhulunbuy
Party	Candidate	Votes	%	±%
Country Liberal	Milton Ballantyne	658	48.3	
Labor	John Flynn	560	41.1	
Independent	William Hendry	144	10.6	
Total formal votes		1,362	96.4	
Informal votes		51	3.6	
Turnout		1,413	74.8	
Two-party-preferred result
Country Liberal	Milton Ballantyne	746	55.3	
Labor	John Flynn	602	44.7	
Country Liberal win		(new seat)		

=== Nightcliff ===
1974 Northern Territory general election: Nightcliff
Party	Candidate	Votes	%	±%
Independent	Dawn Lawrie	786	42.1	
Country Liberal	Alfred Hooper	701	37.5	
Labor	Edward Ellis	382	20.4	
Total formal votes		1,869	96.9	
Informal votes		60	3.1	
Turnout		1,929	78.9	
Two-candidate-preferred result
Independent	Dawn Lawrie	1,021	57.7	
Country Liberal	Alfred Hooper	747	42.3	
Independent win		(new seat)		

=== Port Darwin ===
1974 Northern Territory general election: Port Darwin
Party	Candidate	Votes	%	±%
Country Liberal	William Jettner	622	35.6	
Independent	Ron Withnall; Brian Manning	605	34.7	
Labor	James Gallacher	519	29.7	
Total formal votes		1,823	96.7	
Informal votes		62	3.3	
Turnout		1,885	73.9	
Two-candidate-preferred result
Independent	Ron Withnall	834	53.3	
Country Liberal	William Jettner	731	46.7	
Independent win		(new seat)		

- The number of primary votes each individual Independent received is unknown.

=== Sanderson ===
1974 Northern Territory general election: Sanderson
Party	Candidate	Votes	%	±%
Country Liberal	Liz Andrew	797	41.5	
Labor	Mark Phelan	661	34.5	
Independent	Alexander Allan-Stewart; Herbert Sinclair	461	24.0	
Total formal votes		1,919	96.6	
Informal votes		68	3.4	
Turnout		1,987	84.8	
Two-party-preferred result
Country Liberal	Liz Andrew	1,006	56.5	
Labor	Mark Phelan	773	43.5	
Country Liberal win		(new seat)		

- The number of votes each individual Independent received is unknown.

=== Stuart ===
1974 Northern Territory general election: Stuart
Party	Candidate	Votes	%	±%
Country Liberal	Roger Vale	498	47.7	
Labor	Harry Nelson	301	28.8	
Independent	Reginald Harris	246	23.5	
Total formal votes		1,045	94.9	
Informal votes		56	5.1	
Turnout		1,101	71.1	
Two-party-preferred result
Country Liberal	Roger Vale	644	64.8	
Labor	Geoffrey Loveday	349	35.2	
Country Liberal win		(new seat)		

=== Stuart Park ===
1974 Northern Territory general election: Stuart Park
Party	Candidate	Votes	%	±%
Country Liberal	Marshall Perron	557	33.0	
Independent	William Fisher; John McNamee	646	38.3	
Labor	Geoffrey Loveday	486	28.8	
Total formal votes		1,689	95.5	
Informal votes		79	4.5	
Turnout		1,768	74.1	
Two-candidate-preferred result
Country Liberal	Marshall Perron	763	50.2	
Independent		757	49.8	
Country Liberal win		(new seat)		

- The number of votes each individual Independent received is unknown.
- The independent candidate that came second on preferences is unknown.

=== Tiwi ===
1974 Northern Territory general election: Tiwi
Party	Candidate	Votes	%	±%
Country Liberal	Hyacinth Tungutalum	454	45.4	
Independent	Peter Lawrence; Robert Oaten; Noel Padgham-Purich; Lou Stewart	391	39.1	
Labor	John Nixon	156	15.6	
Total formal votes		1,001	94.3	
Informal votes		61	5.7	
Turnout		1,062	67.6	
Country Liberal win		(new seat)		

- Preferences were not distributed.
- The number of votes each individual Independent received is unknown.

=== Victoria River ===
1974 Northern Territory general election: Victoria River
Party	Candidate	Votes	%	±%
Country Liberal	Goff Letts	717	69.7	
Independent	Wiyendji Nunggula; Charles Renfrey	312	30.3	
Total formal votes		1,029	94.4	
Informal votes		61	5.6	
Turnout		1,090	62.6	
Country Liberal win		(new seat)		

- Preferences were not distributed.
- The number of votes each individual Independent received is unknown.

== See also ==
- 1974 Northern Territory general election
- Members of the Northern Territory Legislative Assembly, 1974–1977
