= Everingham ministry =

The Everingham Ministry (initially named the Everingham Executive) was the ministry of Paul Everingham, the second head of government of the Northern Territory. Everingham was the second and last Majority Leader efore the granting of self-government, after which he became the first Chief Minister.

It first took office in 1977 following the defeat of former Majority Leader Goff Letts and much of his executive at the 1977 election, and became a full ministry with self-government in 1978. It lasted until 1984, when Everingham resigned to enter federal politics.

== Everingham Executive (September 1977 - June 1978) ==
The Everingham Executive was the governing executive of Northern Territory Majority Leader Paul Everingham from his instalment in 1977 until the granting of full self-government. It was the last executive to hold the limited powers granted prior to full self-government in 1978, at which point the Northern Territory had ministries as in other jurisdictions.

It came into existence after the unprecedented events of the 1977 election; while the Country Liberal Party government was easily re-elected, five of its seven executive members, including Majority Leader Dr Goff Letts, lost their seats. This required significant changes to their executive, including the election of Paul Everingham as replacement Majority Leader, the promotion to higher-profile positions of the two other surviving members, Marshall Perron and Ian Tuxworth, and the promotion of two other members, Jim Robertson and Roger Steele to the executive. The executive then governed the Territory under new Majority Leader Everingham from September 1977 until the granting of self-government in June 1978.

Minister	Office
Hon Paul Everingham, MLA	Majority Leader; Chief Secretary; Executive Member for Law
Hon Marshall Perron, MLA	Deputy Majority Leader; Executive Member for Finance and Planning
Hon Ian Tuxworth, MLA	Executive Member for Resources and Health
Hon Jim Robertson, MLA	Manager of Government Business; Executive Member for Community and Social Development
Hon Roger Steele, MLA	Executive Member for Transport and Industry

== First ministry (1 July 1978 – 1 January 1979) ==
When the Territory was formally granted self-government on 1 July 1978, Everingham's executive became a ministry—the first Territory government with full legislative powers.

There were no personnel changes from the previous executive, and very few portfolio changes. However, a number of titles changed - the Majority Leader was now known as the Chief Minister, the Executive Member for Finance was now known as the Treasurer, the Executive Member for Law was now the Attorney-General, and the other executive members were now known as ministers.

The ministry lasted until 1 January 1979, when Chief Minister Paul Everingham decided to promote Nick Dondas to a ministerial position and created several new portfolios accordingly.

Minister	Office
Hon Paul Everingham, MLA	Chief Minister; Attorney-General
Hon Marshall Perron, MLA	Deputy Chief Minister; Treasurer; Minister for Lands and Housing
Hon Ian Tuxworth, MLA	Minister for Health; Minister for Mines and Energy
Hon Jim Robertson, MLA	Leader of Government Business; Minister for Community Development; Minister for Education
Hon Roger Steele, MLA	Minister for Industrial Development; Minister for Transport and Works

== Second ministry (2 January 1979 – 8 March 1979) ==
The second ministry was sworn in on 2 January 1979, when Everingham promoted Nick Dondas into the ministry and created several new portfolios accordingly, and lasted until 8 March 1979, when Everingham directed Dondas to share some of the workload of another minister, Jim Robertson.

Minister	Office
Hon Paul Everingham, MLA	Chief Minister; Attorney-General
Hon Marshall Perron, MLA	Deputy Chief Minister; Treasurer; Minister for Lands and Housing
Hon Ian Tuxworth, MLA	Minister for Health; Minister for Mines and Energy
Hon Jim Robertson, MLA	Leader of Government Business; Minister for Community Development; Minister for Education
Hon Roger Steele, MLA	Minister for Industrial Development; Minister for Transport and Works
Hon Nick Dondas, MLA	Minister for Youth, Sport and Recreation; Minister Assisting the Chief Minister

== Third ministry (9 March 1979 – 1 July 1979) ==
The third ministry was sworn in on 9 March 1979, when Everingham appointed his newest minister, Nick Dondas to the additional position of acting Minister for Community Development, a role which was officially held by Manager of Government Business and Minister for Health Jim Robertson. It lasted until 1 July 1979, when Everingham formally shifted the portfolio from Robertson to Dondas.

Minister	Office
Hon Paul Everingham, MLA	Chief Minister; Attorney-General
Hon Marshall Perron, MLA	Deputy Chief Minister; Treasurer; Minister for Lands and Housing
Hon Ian Tuxworth, MLA	Minister for Health; Minister for Mines and Energy
Hon Jim Robertson, MLA	Leader of Government Business; Minister for Community Development ^{1}; Minister for Education
Hon Roger Steele, MLA	Minister for Industrial Development; Minister for Transport and Works
Hon Nick Dondas, MLA	Minister for Youth, Sport and Recreation; Minister Assisting the Chief Minister; Acting Minister for Community Development ^{1}

^{1} While Jim Robertson was officially the Minister for Community Development during this period, Chief Minister Everingham had directed Nick Dondas to fulfil the position in an acting role.

== Fourth ministry (2 July 1979 – 30 June 1980) ==
The fourth ministry was sworn in on 2 July 1979, and was, for the most part, unchanged from the previous ministry. The new ministry only contained one change, with Jim Robertson losing the community development portfolio, which Nick Dondas had been fulfilling in an acting role since March that year. Dondas was subsequently given the new portfolio in a permanent capacity on 6 July. The ministry served until 30 June 1980, when a major reshuffle occurred in the aftermath of the 1980 election.

Minister	Office
Hon Paul Everingham, MLA	Chief Minister; Attorney-General
Hon Marshall Perron, MLA	Deputy Chief Minister; Treasurer; Minister for Lands and Housing
Hon Ian Tuxworth, MLA	Minister for Health; Minister for Mines and Energy
Hon Jim Robertson, MLA	Leader of Government Business; Minister for Education
Hon Roger Steele, MLA	Minister for Industrial Development; Minister for Transport and Works
Hon Nick Dondas, MLA	Minister for Youth, Sport and Recreation; Minister Assisting the Chief Minister; Acting Minister for Community Development (until 5 July 1979) ^{2}; Minister for Community Development (from 6 July 1979) ^{2}

^{2} Nick Dondas had been acting as Minister for Community Development since 9 March 1979, but was formally appointed to the role on 6 July 1979.

== Fifth ministry (1 July 1980 – 25 January 1982) ==
The fifth ministry was sworn in on 1 July 1980, after the Country Liberal Party's re-election in the 1980 election. The composition of the ministry remained the same from the pre-election ministry, but several portfolios were shuffled between members. It operated until 25 January 1982, when a further reshuffle occurred.

Minister	Office
Hon Paul Everingham, MLA	Chief Minister; Attorney-General
Hon Marshall Perron, MLA	Deputy Chief Minister; Treasurer; Minister for Industrial Development; Minister for Community Development
Hon Ian Tuxworth, MLA	Minister for Health; Minister for Mines and Energy
Hon Jim Robertson, MLA	Leader of the House; Minister for Education; Minister for Lands and Housing
Hon Roger Steele, MLA	Minister for Primary Production and Tourism; Minister Assisting the Treasurer
Hon Nick Dondas, MLA	Minister for Transport and Works; Minister Assisting the Chief Minister; Minister for Youth, Sport and Recreation (from 1 January 1981)

== Sixth ministry (26 January 1982 – 30 November 1982) ==
The sixth ministry was sworn in on 26 January 1982 after a ministerial reshuffle, and operated until 30 November of that year, when a further reshuffle of portfolios took place. Marshall Perron was not formally appointed until 3 February; as was Jim Robertson to his portfolio of Community Development.

Minister	Office
Hon Paul Everingham, MLA	Chief Minister; Attorney-General
Hon Marshall Perron, MLA	Deputy Chief Minister; Treasurer; Minister for Lands and Housing
Hon Ian Tuxworth, MLA	Minister for Health; Minister for Mines and Energy
Hon Jim Robertson, MLA	Leader of the House; Minister for Education; Minister for Community Development
Hon Roger Steele, MLA	Minister for Primary Production; Minister for Industrial Development and Tourism; Minister Assisting the Treasurer
Hon Nick Dondas, MLA	Minister for Transport and Works; Minister for Sport and Recreation; Minister Assisting the Chief Minister

== Seventh ministry (1 December 1982 – 12 December 1983) ==
The seventh ministry was sworn in on 1 December 1982 after a major reshuffle of the ministry by Everingham. The reshuffle had been sparked by Everingham's decision to personally take on the contentious role of Minister for Lands, Industrial Development and Tourism. This resulted in him giving up the position of Attorney-General, which was given to Jim Robertson, the only other member of the ministry with any legal experience. Treasurer Marshall Perron assumed Robertson's previous role of Minister for Education. Nick Dondas was appointed Minister for Health, replacing Ian Tuxworth, who was given the territory's first environment portfolio. Roger Steele assumed Dondas' prior role of Minister for Transport and Works. The ministry operated until 13 December 1983, when a reshuffle in the wake of the 1983 election saw Steele dropped from the ministry and three new ministers appointed.

Minister	Office
Hon Paul Everingham, MLA	Chief Minister; Minister for Lands, Industrial Development and Tourism
Hon Marshall Perron, MLA	Deputy Chief Minister; Treasurer; Minister for Education
Hon Ian Tuxworth, MLA	Minister for Primary Production and Conservation; Minister for Community Development
Hon Jim Robertson, MLA	Leader of the House; Attorney-General; Minister for Mines and Energy
Hon Roger Steele, MLA	Minister for Transport and Works; Minister Assisting the Treasurer
Hon Nick Dondas, MLA	Minister for Health and Housing; Minister for Youth, Sport, Recreation and Ethnic Affairs; Minister Assisting the Chief Minister

== Eighth ministry (13 December 1983 – 16 October 1984) ==
The eighth ministry was sworn in on 13 December 1983 in the wake of a ministerial reshuffle following the Country Liberal Party's landslide re-election in the 1983 election. It saw Nick Dondas replace Marshall Perron as Deputy Chief Minister, the appointment of three new ministers: Tom Harris (education), Noel Padgham-Purich, (housing and conservation) and Daryl Manzie (community development), and the axing of one: former transport minister Roger Steele, who had been a minister since 1977. It operated until 16 October 1984, when Everingham resigned to enter federal politics, and was replaced as Chief Minister by Ian Tuxworth.

Minister	Office
Hon Paul Everingham, MLA	Chief Minister; Minister for Industrial Development and Tourism
Hon Nick Dondas, MLA	Deputy Chief Minister; Minister for Health, Youth, Sport, Recreation and Ethnic Affairs
Hon Marshall Perron, MLA	Treasurer; Minister for Lands
Hon Ian Tuxworth, MLA	Minister for Mines and Energy; Minister for Primary Production
Hon Jim Robertson, MLA	Leader of Government Business; Attorney-General; Minister for Transport and Works
Hon Tom Harris, MLA	Minister for Education
Hon Noel Padgham-Purich, MLA	Minister for Housing and Conservation
Hon Daryl Manzie, MLA	Minister for Community Development
