= Tuxworth ministry =

Government ministry

The Tuxworth Ministry was the ministry of the second Chief Minister of the Northern Territory, Ian Tuxworth. It was sworn in on 17 October 1984 after the resignation of Chief Minister Paul Everingham to run for the Australian House of Representatives and his replacement by Ian Tuxworth.

== First ministry (17 October 1984 – 20 December 1984) ==
It saw little change otherwise from the previous ministry, with Tuxworth taking on Everingham's other portfolios. It operated until 20 December of that year, when Tuxworth initiated a major reshuffle of the ministry.

Minister	Office
Hon Ian Tuxworth, MLA	Chief Minister; Minister for Industrial Development and Tourism; Minister for Mines and Energy; Minister for Primary Production
Hon Nick Dondas, MLA	Deputy Chief Minister; Minister for Health, Sport, Recreation and Ethnic Affairs
Hon Marshall Perron, MLA	Treasurer; Minister for Lands
Hon Jim Robertson, MLA	Leader of Government Business; Attorney-General; Minister for Transport and Works
Hon Tom Harris, MLA	Minister for Education
Hon Noel Padgham-Purich, MLA	Minister for Housing and Conservation
Hon Daryl Manzie, MLA	Minister for Community Development

== Second ministry (21 December 1984 – 19 August 1985) ==
The second ministry was sworn in on 21 December 1984, following a major reshuffle by newly appointed Chief Minister Tuxworth. The new ministry saw significant changes to the roles of a number of key figures. Tuxworth took on the role of Treasurer, formerly held by Marshall Perron, with Perron becoming Attorney-General. Jim Robertson, the former Attorney-General, became Minister for Health, and Daryl Manzie took on Robertson's other former portfolio as Minister for Transport and Works. The new ministry also saw the appointment of two new ministers: Barry Coulter and future Chief Minister Stephen Hatton, and the axing of one minister, former housing and conservation minister Noel Padgham-Purich. It operated until 19 August 1985, when a further ministerial reshuffle took place.

Minister	Office
Hon Ian Tuxworth, MLA	Chief Minister; Treasurer
Hon Nick Dondas, MLA	Deputy Chief Minister; Minister for Industry and Small Business
Hon Marshall Perron, MLA	Attorney-General; Minister for Mines and Energy
Hon Jim Robertson, MLA	Minister for Health; Minister for Youth, Sport, Recreation and Ethnic Affairs; Leader of Government Business (until 25 February 1985)
Hon Tom Harris, MLA	Minister for Education
Hon Daryl Manzie, MLA	Minister for Transport and Works and Housing
Hon Stephen Hatton, MLA	Minister for Lands; Minister for Primary Production; Minister for Ports and Fisheries; Minister for Conservation
Hon Barry Coulter, MLA	Minister for Community Development; Minister for Correctional Services

The role of Leader of Government Business is usually filled by a Cabinet member; however, from 26 February 1985 the position was occupied by Ray Hanrahan, who did not hold ministerial office.

== Third ministry (20 August 1985 – 28 April 1986) ==
The third ministry was sworn in on 20 August 1985, after a minor reshuffle by Tuxworth. The new ministry saw former Health Minister Jim Robertson appointed to a short-lived portfolio of Special Minister for Constitutional Development, aimed at pursuing statehood for the territory. The portfolio was later dropped due to waning interest in the issue when Robertson resigned from parliament in March 1986. Robertson's prior role as Health Minister was filled by new ministerial appointment Ray Hanrahan. The ministry operated until 28 April 1986, when the sudden resignation from the ministry of Attorney-General and former Deputy Chief Minister Marshall Perron forced a significant reshuffle.

Minister	Office
Hon Ian Tuxworth, MLA	Chief Minister; Treasurer
Hon Nick Dondas, MLA	Deputy Chief Minister; Minister for Industry and Small Business and Tourism
Hon Marshall Perron, MLA	Attorney-General; Minister for Mines and Energy
Hon Jim Robertson, MLA (until 26 March 1986)	Special Minister for Constitutional Development
Hon Tom Harris, MLA	Minister for Education
Hon Daryl Manzie, MLA	Minister for Transport and Works and Housing
Hon Stephen Hatton, MLA	Minister for Lands; Minister for Primary Production; Minister for Ports and Fisheries; Minister for Conservation
Hon Barry Coulter, MLA	Minister for Community Development; Minister for Correctional Services
Hon Ray Hanrahan, MLA	Leader of Government Business; Minister for Health; Minister for Youth, Sport, Recreation and Ethnic Affairs

== Fourth ministry (29 April 1986 – 14 May 1986) ==
The fourth ministry was sworn in on 29 April 1986 as a result of a major reshuffle caused in part by the sudden resignation from the ministry of Attorney-General and former Deputy Chief Minister Marshall Perron. Tuxworth ceded the position of Treasurer to Barry Coulter. Former transport minister Daryl Manzie was appointed Attorney-General in Perron's place, while also replacing Tom Harris as Minister for Education. Harris replaced Ray Hanrahan as Minister for Health, with Hanrahan being demoted to responsibilities for communications and tourism. The ministry also saw the promotion of new minister Don Dale, who was given several junior portfolios. It operated until 14 May 1986, when Tuxworth was ousted as Chief Minister by Mines and Energy Minister Stephen Hatton.

Minister	Office
Hon Ian Tuxworth, MLA	Chief Minister
Hon Nick Dondas, MLA	Deputy Chief Minister; Minister for Transport and Works; Minister for Ports and Fisheries; Minister for Lands
Hon Daryl Manzie, MLA	Attorney-General; Minister for Education
Hon Barry Coulter, MLA	Treasurer; Minister for Conservation
Hon Stephen Hatton, MLA	Minister for Primary Production; Minister for Mines and Energy
Hon Tom Harris, MLA	Minister for Health; Minister for Housing
Hon Ray Hanrahan, MLA	Leader of Government Business; Minister for Business, Technology and Communications; Minister for Tourism
Hon Don Dale, MLA	Minister for Community Development; Minister for Correctional Services; Minister for Youth, Sport, Recreation and Ethnic Affairs
