= Hatton ministry =

Northern Territory governments, 1986–1988

The Hatton Ministry was the ministry of the third Chief Minister of the Northern Territory, Stephen Hatton. It was sworn in on 15 May 1986, following the ousting of former Chief Minister Ian Tuxworth by his Mines and Energy Minister, Hatton.

== First ministry (15 May 1986 – 18 March 1987) ==
The new ministry saw two main changes apart from the leadership, with Barry Coulter replacing Nick Dondas as Deputy Chief Minister and new minister Terry McCarthy being appointed to the junior role of Minister for Primary Production and Minister for Conservation. It operated until 18 March 1987, when Coulter was replaced as Deputy Chief Minister by Ray Hanrahan.

Minister	Office
Hon Stephen Hatton, MLA	Chief Minister
Hon Barry Coulter, MLA	Deputy Chief Minister; Treasurer; Minister for Mines and Energy
Hon Nick Dondas, MLA	Minister for Transport and Works; Minister for Ports and Fisheries; Minister for Lands
Hon Daryl Manzie, MLA	Attorney-General; Minister for Education
Hon Ray Hanrahan, MLA	Leader of Government Business; Minister for Business, Technology and Communications; Minister for Tourism
Hon Tom Harris, MLA	Minister for Health; Minister for Housing
Hon Don Dale, MLA	Minister for Community Development; Minister for Correctional Services; Minister for Youth, Sport, Recreation and Ethnic Affairs
Hon Terry McCarthy, MLA	Minister for Primary Production; Minister for Conservation

== Second ministry (19 March 1987 – 7 May 1987) ==
The second ministry was sworn in on 19 March 1987 after a reshuffle of the ministry by Hatton. The new ministry saw two main changes from its predecessor: Ray Hanrahan replaced Barry Coulter as Deputy Chief Minister, although Coulter stayed on as Treasurer, and former Deputy Chief Minister Nick Dondas was dropped from the ministry. It also saw new minister Terry McCarthy dropped, with his portfolios being taken on by Hanrahan, and the appointment of another new minister, Fred Finch, who became Minister for Transport and Works. The ministry saw one change during its lifetime, with Minister for Labour and Administrative Services Tom Harris resigning from the ministry on 30 April 1987. Hatton took on Harris' portfolio for the remainder of the term of the ministry. It operated until 7 May 1987, when McCarthy was reappointed to the ministry to take on Harris' former portfolio.

Minister	Office
Hon Stephen Hatton, MLA	Chief Minister; Minister for Labour and Administrative Services (from 1 May 1987)
Hon Ray Hanrahan, MLA	Deputy Chief Minister; Leader of Government Business; Minister for Lands and Housing; Minister for Conservation; Minister for Tourism
Hon Barry Coulter, MLA	Treasurer; Minister for Local Government; Minister for Mines and Energy
Hon Marshall Perron, MLA	Minister for Industries and Development
Hon Daryl Manzie, MLA	Attorney-General; Minister for Education
Hon Don Dale, MLA	Minister for Health and Community Services
Hon Tom Harris, MLA (until 30 April 1987)	Minister for Labour and Administrative Services
Hon Fred Finch, MLA	Minister for Transport and Works

== Third ministry (8 May 1987 – 20 December 1987) ==
The third ministry was sworn in on 8 May 1987 after Hatton reappointed former minister Terry McCarthy to the ministry to take on the portfolio of Tom Harris, who had resigned as Minister for Labour and Administrative Services in April. The portfolio of local government, previously held by Barry Coulter was abolished on 27 November 1987, during the term of this ministry. The ministry operated until 20 December 1987, when Hatton undertook a further reshuffle of his ministry.

Minister	Office
Hon Stephen Hatton, MLA	Chief Minister
Hon Ray Hanrahan, MLA	Deputy Chief Minister; Leader of Government Business; Minister for Lands and Housing; Minister for Conservation; Minister for Tourism
Hon Barry Coulter, MLA	Treasurer; Minister for Local Government (until 27 November 1987); Minister for Mines and Energy
Hon Marshall Perron, MLA	Minister for Industries and Development
Hon Daryl Manzie, MLA	Attorney-General; Minister for Education
Hon Don Dale, MLA	Minister for Health and Community Services
Hon Terry McCarthy, MLA	Minister for Labour and Administrative Services
Hon Fred Finch, MLA	Minister for Transport and Works

== Fourth ministry (21 December 1987 – 5 April 1988) ==
The fourth ministry was sworn in on 21 December 1987. The ministry operated until 5 April 1988, when Deputy Chief Minister Ray Hanrahan resigned from the ministry, shortly before resigning from politics altogether.

Minister	Office
Hon Stephen Hatton, MLA	Chief Minister
Hon Ray Hanrahan, MLA	Deputy Chief Minister; Leader of Government Business; Minister for Education; Minister for Tourism
Hon Barry Coulter, MLA	Treasurer; Minister for Mines and Energy
Hon Marshall Perron, MLA	Minister for Industries and Development
Hon Daryl Manzie, MLA	Attorney-General; Minister for Lands and Housing; Minister for Conservation
Hon Don Dale, MLA	Minister for Health and Community Services
Hon Terry McCarthy, MLA	Minister for Labour and Administrative Services (until 14 February 1988); Minister for Labour, Administrative Services and Local Government (from 15 February 1988)
Hon Fred Finch, MLA	Minister for Transport and Works

== Fifth ministry (6 April 1988 – 13 July 1988) ==
The fifth ministry was sworn in on 6 April 1988 after the resignation of Ray Hanrahan as Deputy Chief Minister and his succession by Barry Coulter. The new ministry also saw the return to the ministry of former minister Tom Harris as Minister for Education and the promotion of new minister Eric Poole as Minister for Tourism. The ministry operated until 13 July of that year, when Stephen Hatton resigned as Chief Minister and was replaced by Marshall Perron.

Minister	Office
Hon Stephen Hatton, MLA	Chief Minister
Hon Barry Coulter, MLA	Deputy Chief Minister; Treasurer; Minister for Mines and Energy; Leader of Government Business (from 17 May 1988)
Hon Marshall Perron, MLA	Minister for Industries and Development
Hon Daryl Manzie, MLA	Attorney-General; Minister for Lands and Housing; Minister for Conservation
Hon Don Dale, MLA	Minister for Health and Community Services
Hon Terry McCarthy, MLA	Minister for Labour and Administrative Services and Local Government
Hon Fred Finch, MLA	Minister for Transport and Works
Hon Tom Harris, MLA	Minister for Education; Minister Assisting the Chief Minister on Constitutional Development
Hon Eric Poole, MLA	Minister for Tourism; Minister Assisting the Chief Minister on Central Australian Affairs

Ray Hanrahan continued as Leader of Government Business until 16 May 1988, despite having resigned from his Cabinet positions on 5 April.
