= List of Northern Territory ministries =

The ministries of the Northern Territory are appointed by the Chief Minister of the Northern Territory each term from the members of the Northern Territory Legislative Assembly.

| Ministry | Party | Term start | Term end | Term in office | Notes |
|---|---|---|---|---|---|
| Letts Executive | Country Liberal | November 1974 | September 1977 | | |
| Everingham Executive | Country Liberal | September 1977 | June 1978 | | |
| Everingham Ministry | Country Liberal | 1 July 1978 | 16 October 1984 | 6 years, 107 days | |
| Tuxworth Ministry | Country Liberal | 17 October 1984 | 14 May 1986 | 1 year, 209 days | |
| Hatton Ministry | Country Liberal | 15 May 1986 | 13 July 1988 | 2 years, 59 days | |
| Perron Ministry | Country Liberal | 14 July 1988 | 25 May 1995 | 6 years, 315 days | |
| Stone Ministry | Country Liberal | 26 May 1995 | 8 February 1999 | 3 years, 258 days | |
| Burke Ministry | Country Liberal | 9 February 1999 | 26 August 2001 | 2 years, 198 days | |
| Martin Ministry | Labor | 27 August 2001 | 25 November 2007 | 6 years, 90 days | |
| Henderson Ministry | Labor | 26 November 2007 | 28 August 2012 | 4 years, 276 days | |
| Mills Ministry | Country Liberal | 29 August 2012 | 13 March 2013 | 196 days | |
| Giles Ministry | Country Liberal | 14 March 2013 | 27 August 2016 | 3 years, 166 days | |
| First Gunner Ministry | Labor | 31 August 2016 | 13 May 2022 | 5 years, 256 days | |
| Second Gunner Ministry | Labor | 31 August 2016 | 13 May 2022 | 5 years, 256 days | |
| Fyles Ministry | Labor | 13 May 2022 | 21 December 2023 | 1 year, 222 days | |
| Lawler Ministry | Labor | 21 December 2023 | 28 August 2024 | 251 days | |
| Finocchiaro Ministry | Country Liberal | 28 August 2024 | Incumbent | 2 years, 1 day | |

== See also ==
- Members of the Northern Territory Legislative Assembly
- List of Northern Territory by-elections
