= Letts Executive =

The Letts Executive was the executive of Majority Leader of the Northern Territory Goff Letts, who led the Northern Territory from the implementation of the Northern Territory Legislative Assembly in 1974 until his defeat in his own seat at the 1977 election. It was the first ministry to come from the Legislative Assembly. He was the only head of government of the Northern Territory not to assume the title of Chief Minister of the Northern Territory, as self-government was not granted until 1978. His governments did not have anywhere near the range of powers available to Territory governments after the granting of self-government, but nevertheless fulfilled similar functions. Letts' successor as Majority Leader and his one-time deputy, Paul Everingham, became the first Chief Minister in 1978.

Jim Robertson, MLA, while not technically a member of the executive, served as Manager of Government Business throughout this period.

== First Executive ==
The first executive lasted from November 1974 to August 1975, when Deputy Majority Leader Paul Everingham resigned from the executive to focus on his legal practice, and was succeeded as deputy by then-Speaker Bernie Kilgariff.

Minister	Office
Dr Goff Letts, MLA	Majority Leader; Executive Member for Primary Industry and the Northern Territory Public Service
Paul Everingham, MLA	Deputy Majority Leader; Executive Member for Finance and Law
Grant Tambling, MLA	Executive Member for Community Development
Liz Andrew, MLA	Executive Member for Education and Consumer Services
Dave Pollock, MLA	Executive Member for Social Affairs
Ian Tuxworth, MLA	Executive Member for Resource Development
Roger Ryan, MLA	Executive Member for Transport and Secondary Industry

== Second Executive ==
The second executive served from August to November 1975. It was short-lived, as Bernie Kilgariff, who had replaced Paul Everingham in the executive in August, resigned from the Assembly in November to run for the Australian Senate.

Minister	Office
Dr Goff Letts, MLA	Majority Leader; Executive Member for Primary Industry and the Northern Territory Public Service
Bernie Kilgariff, MLA	Deputy Majority Leader; Executive Member for Finance and Law
Grant Tambling, MLA	Executive Member for Community Development
Liz Andrew, MLA	Executive Member for Education and Consumer Services
Dave Pollock, MLA	Executive Member for Social Affairs
Ian Tuxworth, MLA	Executive Member for Resource Development
Roger Ryan, MLA	Executive Member for Transport and Secondary Industry

== Third Executive ==
The third executive served from December 1975 to December 1976. Deputy Majority Leader Bernie Kilgariff had resigned in November 1976, requiring a reshuffle of the remaining executive members. In this third executive, Grant Tambling became Deputy Majority Leader and Marshall Perron, a future Chief Minister, was brought into the executive, with several changes also made to the portfolios of other members.

Minister	Office
Dr Goff Letts, MLA	Majority Leader; Executive Member for Primary Industry and the Northern Territory Public Service
Grant Tambling, MLA	Deputy Majority Leader; Executive Member for Finance and Community Development
Marshall Perron, MLA	Executive Member for Municipal and Consumer Affairs
Liz Andrew, MLA	Executive Member for Education and Law
Dave Pollock, MLA	Executive Member for Social Affairs
Ian Tuxworth, MLA	Executive Member for Resource Development
Roger Ryan, MLA	Executive Member for Transport and Secondary Industry

== Fourth Executive ==
The fourth executive lasted from December 1976 to September 1977. It came into existence not because of personnel changes, but as a result of a reshuffle to prepare for the 1977 election. Letts made a short-lived change with this executive, styling its members as "cabinet members" instead of "executive members", which was abandoned when Paul Everingham succeeded Letts as Majority Leader after the election.

This executive was devastated at the 1977 election; five executive members (Goff Letts, Grant Tambling, Liz Andrew, Dave Pollock and Roger Ryan) were among the six Country Liberal Party members to lose their seats. Former Deputy Majority Leader Paul Everingham disbanded his legal practice and returned from the backbenches to replace Letts as Majority Leader, later becoming the first Chief Minister of the Northern Territory, while both surviving members of the last Letts executive, Ian Tuxworth and Marshall Perron, would also later go on to serve as Chief Minister.

Minister	Office
Dr Goff Letts, MLA	Majority Leader; Chief Secretary
Grant Tambling, MLA	Deputy Majority Leader; Cabinet Member for Finance and Local Government
Liz Andrew, MLA	Cabinet Member for Law
Roger Ryan, MLA	Cabinet Member for Transport and Industry
Ian Tuxworth, MLA	Cabinet Member for Community Services
Dave Pollock, MLA	Cabinet Member for Resources
Marshall Perron, MLA	Cabinet Member for Education and Planning
