= Members of the Northern Territory Legislative Assembly =

Following are lists of members of the Northern Territory Legislative Assembly:

- Members of the Northern Territory Legislative Assembly, 1974–1977 (1st parliament)
- Members of the Northern Territory Legislative Assembly, 1977–1980 (2nd parliament)
- Members of the Northern Territory Legislative Assembly, 1980–1983 (3rd parliament)
- Members of the Northern Territory Legislative Assembly, 1983–1987 (4th parliament)
- Members of the Northern Territory Legislative Assembly, 1987–1990 (5th parliament)
- Members of the Northern Territory Legislative Assembly, 1990–1994 (6th parliament)
- Members of the Northern Territory Legislative Assembly, 1994–1997 (7th parliament)
- Members of the Northern Territory Legislative Assembly, 1997–2001 (8th parliament)
- Members of the Northern Territory Legislative Assembly, 2001–2005 (9th parliament)
- Members of the Northern Territory Legislative Assembly, 2005–2008 (10th parliament)
- Members of the Northern Territory Legislative Assembly, 2008–2012 (11th parliament)
- Members of the Northern Territory Legislative Assembly, 2012–2016 (12th parliament)
- Members of the Northern Territory Legislative Assembly, 2016–2020 (13th parliament)
- Members of the Northern Territory Legislative Assembly, 2020–2024 (14th parliament)
- Members of the Northern Territory Legislative Assembly, 2024–2028 (15th parliament)

== See also ==
- List of Northern Territory by-elections
- List of Northern Territory ministries
