= Members of the Northern Territory Legislative Assembly, 1980–1983 =

This is a list of members of the Northern Territory Legislative Assembly from 1980 to 1983.

Name	Party	Electorate	Years in office
Neil Bell ^{[1]}	Labor	MacDonnell	1981–1997
Bob Collins	Labor	Arnhem	1977–1987
Denis Collins	Country Liberal	Alice Springs	1980–1994
Nick Dondas	Country Liberal	Casuarina	1974–1994
Jack Doolan	Labor	Victoria River	1977–1983
June D'Rozario	Labor	Sanderson	1977–1983
Paul Everingham	Country Liberal	Jingili	1974–1984
Tom Harris	Country Liberal	Port Darwin	1977–1990
Jon Isaacs ^{[2]}	Labor	Millner	1977–1981
Dawn Lawrie	Independent	Nightcliff	1974–1983
Dan Leo	Labor	Nhulunbuy	1980–1990
Les MacFarlane	Country Liberal	Elsey	1974–1983
Pam O'Neil	Labor	Fannie Bay	1977–1983
Noel Padgham-Purich	Country Liberal	Tiwi	1977–1997
Neville Perkins ^{[1]}	Labor	MacDonnell	1977–1981
Marshall Perron	Country Liberal	Stuart Park	1974–1995
Jim Robertson	Country Liberal	Gillen	1974–1986
Terry Smith ^{[2]}	Labor	Millner	1981–1991
Roger Steele	Country Liberal	Ludmilla	1974–1987
Ian Tuxworth	Country Liberal	Barkly	1974–1990
Roger Vale	Country Liberal	Stuart	1974–1994

^{1} Labor member Neville Perkins resigned on 6 March 1981; Labor candidate Neil Bell won the resulting by-election on 28 August 1981.
^{2} Labor member Jon Isaacs resigned on 2 November 1981; Labor candidate Terry Smith won the resulting by-election on 21 November 1981.

== See also ==
- 1980 Northern Territory general election
