= Perron ministry =

The Perron Ministry was the ministry of the fourth Chief Minister of the Northern Territory, Marshall Perron. It was sworn in on 14 July 1988 after the resignation of Stephen Hatton as Chief Minister and his replacement by Perron.

== First ministry (14 July 1988 – 30 July 1989) ==
The first Perron ministry saw one other change apart from the leadership, with the promotion of future Deputy Chief Minister Mike Reed to the ministry for the first time. It operated until 30 July 1989, when Perron undertook a reshuffle following the resignation from the ministry of Health Minister Don Dale.

Minister	Office
Hon Marshall Perron, MLA	Chief Minister; Treasurer
Hon Barry Coulter, MLA	Deputy Chief Minister; Leader of Government Business; Minister for Mines and Energy; Minister for Industries and Development
Hon Daryl Manzie, MLA	Attorney-General; Minister for Lands and Housing; Minister for Conservation
Hon Don Dale, MLA (until 27 July 1989)	Minister for Health and Community Services
Hon Tom Harris, MLA	Minister for Education; Minister Assisting the Chief Minister on Constitutional Development
Hon Fred Finch, MLA	Minister for Transport and Works
Hon Terry McCarthy, MLA	Minister for Labour and Administrative Services and Local Government
Hon Eric Poole, MLA	Minister for Tourism; Minister Assisting the Chief Minister on Central Australian Affairs
Hon Mike Reed, MLA	Minister for Primary Industry and Fisheries

== Second ministry (31 July 1989 – 3 September 1989) ==
The second ministry was sworn in on 31 July 1989, following the resignation from the ministry of Health and Community Services Minister Don Dale. The new ministry saw Chief Minister Marshall Perron take on Dale's former portfolio in a permanent capacity. It operated until 3 September of that year, when Perron initiated a further reshuffle of the ministry.

Minister	Office
Hon Marshall Perron, MLA	Chief Minister; Treasurer; Minister for Health and Community Services
Hon Barry Coulter, MLA	Deputy Chief Minister; Leader of Government Business; Minister for Mines and Energy; Minister for Industries and Development
Hon Daryl Manzie, MLA	Attorney-General; Minister for Lands and Housing; Minister for Conservation
Hon Tom Harris, MLA	Minister for Education; Minister Assisting the Chief Minister on Constitutional Development
Hon Fred Finch, MLA	Minister for Transport and Works
Hon Terry McCarthy, MLA	Minister for Labour and Administrative Services and Local Government
Hon Eric Poole, MLA	Minister for Tourism; Minister Assisting the Chief Minister on Central Australian Affairs
Hon Mike Reed, MLA	Minister for Primary Industry and Fisheries

== Third ministry (4 September 1989 – 12 November 1990) ==
The third ministry was sworn on 4 September 1989 after a reshuffle of the ministry by Chief Minister Perron. The main focus of the reshuffle was the return to the ministry of former Chief Minister Stephen Hatton, who Perron had ousted in July 1988, while Eric Poole was dropped. Hatton received the health and community services portfolio, formerly held by Perron, and the conservation portfolio, previously held by Daryl Manzie. The new ministry also saw the promotion of new minister Roger Vale, who received several junior portfolios. Notably, this ministry also saw the assignment of the territory's first ever Aboriginal affairs portfolio, with Terry McCarthy being appointed Minister Assisting the Chief Minister on Aboriginal Affairs. It operated until 12 November 1990, when Perron undertook a further reshuffle of the ministry.

Minister	Office
Hon Marshall Perron, MLA	Chief Minister; Treasurer; Minister for Police, Fire and Emergency Services
Hon Barry Coulter, MLA	Deputy Chief Minister; Leader of Government Business; Minister for Mines and Energy; Minister for Industries and Development
Hon Daryl Manzie, MLA	Attorney-General; Minister for Lands and Housing
Hon Tom Harris, MLA	Minister for Education, the Arts and Cultural Affairs
Hon Stephen Hatton, MLA	Minister for Health and Community Services; Minister for Conservation
Hon Fred Finch, MLA	Minister for Transport and Works; Minister for Racing and Gaming
Hon Terry McCarthy, MLA	Minister for Labour, Administrative Services and Local Government; Minister Assisting the Chief Minister on Aboriginal Affairs
Hon Mike Reed, MLA	Minister for Primary Industry and Fisheries; Minister for Correctional Services
Hon Roger Vale, MLA	Minister for Tourism; Minister for Youth, Sport, Recreation and Ethnic Affairs; Minister Assisting the Chief Minister on Central Australian Affairs

== Fourth ministry (13 November 1990 – 29 November 1992) ==
The fourth ministry was sworn in on 13 November 1990 after Perron undertook a reshuffle of the previous ministry. The central change of the reshuffle was the promotion to the ministry of rising star and future Chief Minister Shane Stone with responsibilities for education and employment. It also saw the promotion of another new minister, Max Ortmann as Minister for Lands and Housing, a portfolio previously held by Daryl Manzie. The new ministry also saw a number of portfolio changes among the existing members, with Stephen Hatton losing the health portfolio to Manzie and the conservation portfolio to Mike Reed, instead taking the industries and development portfolio from Barry Coulter. It operated until 29 November 1992, when Perron again reshuffled his ministry.

Minister	Office
Hon Marshall Perron, MLA	Chief Minister; Minister for Police, Fire and Emergency Services
Hon Barry Coulter, MLA	Deputy Chief Minister; Treasurer; Leader of Government Business (until 29 April 1991); Minister for Mines and Energy
Hon Daryl Manzie, MLA	Attorney-General; Minister for Health and Community Services
Hon Stephen Hatton, MLA	Minister for Industries and Development
Hon Shane Stone, MLA	Minister for Education and the Arts (until 19 December 1991); Minister for Employment and Training (until 19 December 1991); Minister for Education and Training (from 20 December 1991); Minister for Public Employment; Minister for the Arts (from 20 December 1991)
Hon Fred Finch, MLA	Minister for Transport and Works
Hon Mike Reed, MLA	Minister for Primary Industry and Fisheries; Minister for Conservation; Minister for Correctional Services
Hon Roger Vale, MLA	Minister for Tourism; Minister for Sport, Recreation, Ethnic Affairs and Local Government
Hon Max Ortmann, MLA	Minister for Lands and Housing

The role of Leader of Government Business is usually filled by a Cabinet member; however, from 30 April 1991 the position was occupied by Rick Setter, who did not hold ministerial office.

== Fifth ministry (30 November 1992 – 15 September 1993) ==
The fifth ministry was sworn in on 30 November 1992 after a major reshuffle of the ministry by Chief Minister Marshall Perron, which saw changes to the portfolio of nearly every minister. Shane Stone was appointed as the new Attorney-General, replacing Daryl Manzie, with Fred Finch taking on Stone's former role as Minister for Education and Minister for Public Employment. Max Ortmann was appointed as Minister for Transport and Works, replacing Finch. Mike Reed was promoted to Minister for Health and Community Services, also replacing Manzie, who took on the role of Minister for Conservation. Stephen Hatton was appointed as the territory's first Minister for Aboriginal Development.

The new ministry also saw Eric Poole reappointed to the ministry, taking on a number of junior portfolios, with existing Roger Vale dropped to make way. The ministry saw two changes during its lifetime. In the first, an incident which made national news, Minister for Transport and Works Max Ortmann was forced to resign in August 1993 after assaulting a reporter on live television. Daryl Manzie took on his portfolios for the remainder of the term of the ministry. The second, more minor change, saw Poole take on a new portfolio of Minister Responsible for the Liquor Commission in June 1993. Daryl Manzie was also appointed as Attorney-General in place of Shane Stone on two occasions in 1993. The ministry operated until 15 September 1993, when Perron initiated a further reshuffle of the ministry.

Minister	Office
Hon Marshall Perron, MLA	Chief Minister; Minister for Police, Fire and Emergency Services
Hon Barry Coulter, MLA	Deputy Chief Minister; Treasurer; Minister for Tourism
Hon Shane Stone, MLA	Attorney-General; Minister for the Arts; Minister for Mines and Energy; Minister for Industries and Development; Minister for Asian Relations and Trade
Hon Stephen Hatton, MLA	Minister for Aboriginal Development; Minister for Lands, Housing and Local Government
Hon Fred Finch, MLA	Minister for Education and Training; Minister for Public Employment
Hon Daryl Manzie, MLA	Minister for Conservation; Minister for Work Health and Territory Insurance; Minister for Transport and Works (from 18 August 1993)
Hon Mike Reed, MLA	Minister for Health and Community Services; Minister for Primary Industry and Fisheries
Hon Max Ortmann, MLA (until 17 August 1993)	Minister for Transport and Works
Hon Eric Poole, MLA	Minister for Correctional Services; Minister for Sport, Recreation and Ethnic Affairs; Minister Assisting the Chief Minister on Central Australian Matters; Minister Responsible for the Liquor Commission (from 30 June 1993)

The role of Leader of Government Business continued to be held by Rick Setter, who unusually did not simultaneously hold Cabinet office.

== Sixth and seventh ministries (16 September 1993 - 14 June 1994 and 15 June 1994 – 17 July 1994) ==
The sixth ministry was sworn in on 16 September 1993, after a minor reshuffle by Chief Minister Marshall Perron. The new ministry saw an expansion of the role of Daryl Manzie, who regained the Attorney-General portfolio, previously lost to Shane Stone, and became Minister of Transport and Works in a permanent capacity after the forced resignation of Max Ortmann. Perron announced at the time that he had decided to continue with a smaller ministry rather than appoint a new minister to replace Ortmann. The ministry operated until 14 June 1994, when an identical ministry was sworn in in the wake of the government's victory at the 1994 election. The post-election ministry was sworn in on 15 June 1994 after the Country Liberal Party government's victory in the 1994 election. It operated until 17 July of that year, when Perron reshuffled his ministry for the final time.

Minister	Office
Hon Marshall Perron, MLA	Chief Minister; Minister for Police, Fire and Emergency Services
Hon Barry Coulter, MLA	Deputy Chief Minister; Treasurer; Minister for Tourism; Minister for Conservation; Leader of Government Business (from 27 June 1994)
Hon Shane Stone, MLA	Minister for Asian Relations and Trade; Minister for Industries and Development; Minister for Mines and Energy; Minister for Ethnic Affairs; Minister for the Arts
Hon Stephen Hatton, MLA	Minister for Aboriginal Development; Minister for Lands, Housing and Local Government
Hon Fred Finch, MLA	Minister for Education and Training; Minister for Public Employment
Hon Daryl Manzie, MLA	Attorney-General; Minister for Transport and Works
Hon Mike Reed, MLA	Minister for Health and Community Services; Minister for Primary Industry and Fisheries
Hon Eric Poole, MLA	Minister for Correctional Services; Minister for Sport and Recreation; Minister for Work Health and Territory Insurance; Minister Assisting the Chief Minister on Central Australian Matters

Rick Setter continued to hold the position of Leader of Government Business until 15 May 1994. He was replaced by Barry Coulter on 27 June, following the 1994 election.

== Eighth ministry (18 July 1994 – 25 May 1995) ==
The eighth ministry was sworn in on 18 July 1994, after Chief Minister Marshall Perron initiated a reshuffle of his ministry. The new ministry saw a number of portfolio changes, with Daryl Manzie taking the police, fire and emergency services portfolio from Perron, Eric Poole taking the public employment portfolio from Fred Finch and Mike Reed taking the mines and energy portfolio from Shane Stone. It also saw the creation of a new statehood-related portfolio, with Stephen Hatton becoming Minister Assisting the Chief Minister on Constitutional Development Matters. The new ministry also saw the promotion of a new minister in Mick Palmer, which was the cause of some controversy due to Palmer having assaulted a journalist two years previously. It operated until 25 May 1995, when Chief Minister Perron retired from politics immediately after the passage of the Rights of the Terminally Ill Act 1995, the voluntary euthanasia legalisation bill he had advocated for some years. Perron had been the last surviving member of the first Legislative Assembly elected in 1974, and had served as an executive member/cabinet minister since December 1975, save for an 11-month break in 1986 and 1987.

Minister	Office
Hon Marshall Perron, MLA	Chief Minister
Hon Barry Coulter, MLA	Deputy Chief Minister; Treasurer; Minister for Tourism; Minister for Conservation; Leader of Government Business
Hon Shane Stone, MLA	Minister for Asian Relations and Trade; Minister for Industries and Development; Minister for Ethnic Affairs; Minister for the Arts
Hon Stephen Hatton, MLA	Minister for Aboriginal Development; Minister for Lands, Housing and Local Government; Minister Assisting the Chief Minister on Constitutional Development Matters
Hon Fred Finch, MLA	Minister for Education and Training; Attorney-General (from 28 July 1994)
Hon Daryl Manzie, MLA	Attorney-General (until 28 July 1994); Minister for Police, Fire and Emergency Services; Minister for Transport and Works
Hon Mike Reed, MLA	Minister for Health and Community Services; Minister for Mines and Energy; Minister Assisting the Treasurer
Hon Eric Poole, MLA	Minister for Public Employment; Minister for Correctional Services; Minister for Sport and Recreation; Minister for Work Health and Territory Insurance and the Liquor Commission; Minister Assisting the Chief Minister on Central Australian Matters
Hon Mick Palmer, MLA	Minister for Primary Industry and Fisheries; Minister Assisting the Minister for Lands, Housing and Local Government on Lands Matters
