= Members of the Northern Territory Legislative Assembly, 1977–1980 =

This is a list of members of the Australian Northern Territory Legislative Assembly from 1977 to 1980. Though there had been one previous Assembly, this Assembly was the first to have real power over affairs in the territory, as self-government was only granted in 1978.

Name	Party	Electorate	Years in office
Milton Ballantyne	Country Liberal	Nhulunbuy	1974–1980
Bob Collins	Labor	Arnhem	1977–1987
Nick Dondas	Country Liberal	Casuarina	1974–1994
Jack Doolan	Labor	Victoria River	1977–1983
June D'Rozario	Labor	Sanderson	1977–1983
Paul Everingham	Country Liberal	Jingili	1974–1984
Tom Harris	Country Liberal	Port Darwin	1977–1990
Jon Isaacs	Labor	Millner	1977–1981
Dawn Lawrie	Independent	Nightcliff	1974–1983
Les MacFarlane	Country Liberal	Elsey	1974–1983
Rod Oliver	Country Liberal	Alice Springs	1977–1980
Rod Oliver	Independent^{[1]}	Alice Springs	1977–1980
Pam O'Neil	Labor	Fannie Bay	1977–1983
Noel Padgham-Purich	Country Liberal	Tiwi	1977–1997
Neville Perkins	Labor	MacDonnell	1977–1981
Marshall Perron	Country Liberal	Stuart Park	1974–1995
Jim Robertson	Country Liberal	Gillen	1974–1986
Roger Steele	Country Liberal	Ludmilla	1974–1987
Ian Tuxworth	Country Liberal	Barkly	1974–1990
Roger Vale	Country Liberal	Stuart	1974–1994

^{[1]} The member for Alice Springs, Rod Oliver, resigned from the Country Liberal Party on 21 August 1979, and served out the remainder of his term as an independent.

== See also ==
- 1977 Northern Territory general election
