= Members of the Northern Territory Legislative Assembly, 1974–1977 =

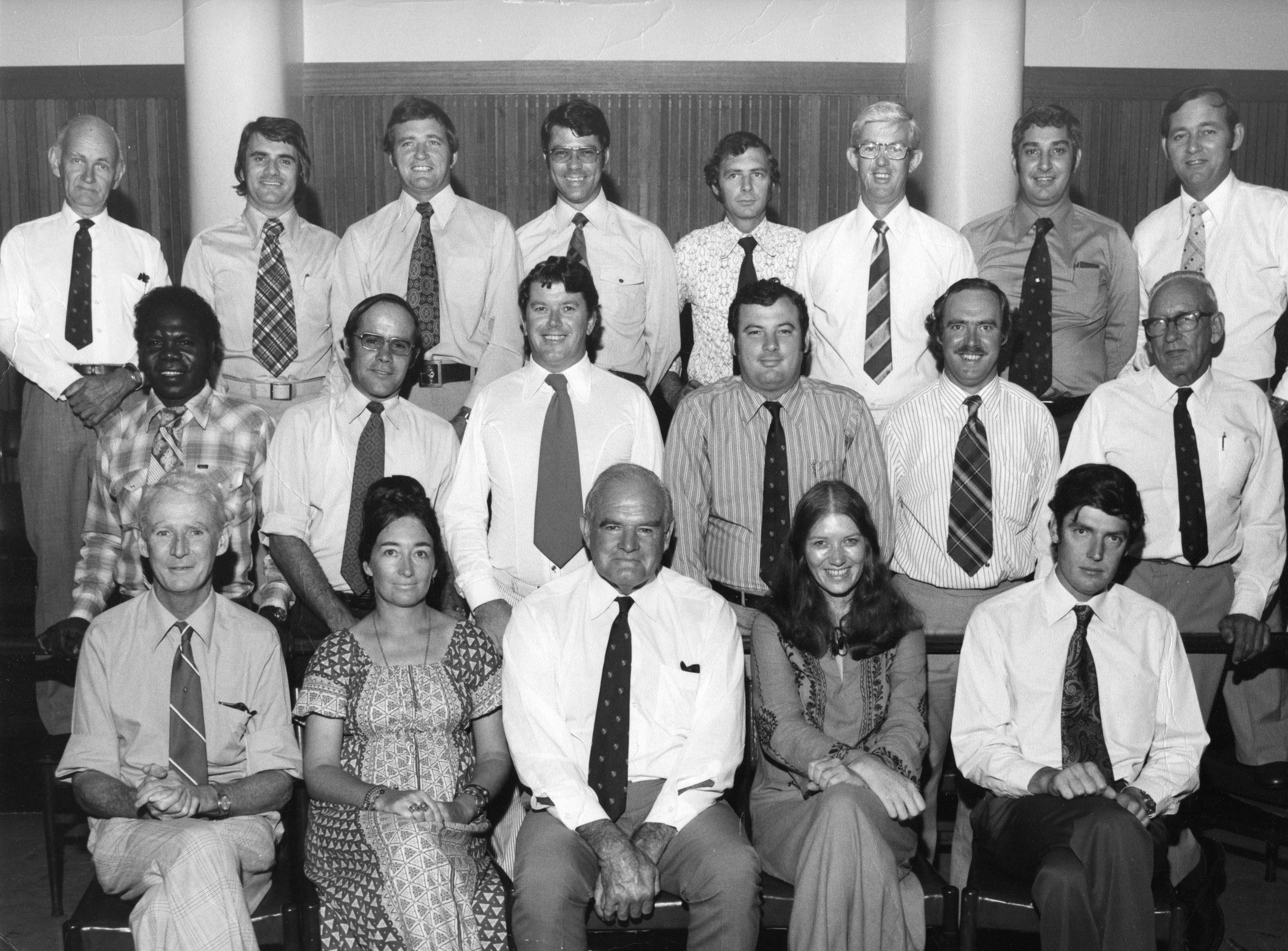
The first Northern Territory Legislative Assembly, 1976

This is a list of members of the Northern Territory Legislative Assembly from 1974 to 1977. This first Assembly only had limited powers, as the Northern Territory was not granted self-government until 1978.

Name	Party	Electorate	Years in office
Liz Andrew	Country Liberal	Sanderson	1974–1977
Milton Ballantyne	Country Liberal	Nhulunbuy	1974–1980
Nick Dondas	Country Liberal	Casuarina	1974–1994
Paul Everingham	Country Liberal	Jingili	1974–1984
Bernie Kilgariff ^{[1]}	Country Liberal	Alice Springs	1974–1976
Rupert Kentish	Country Liberal	Arnhem	1974–1977
Dawn Lawrie	Independent	Nightcliff	1974–1983
Dr Goff Letts	Country Liberal	Victoria River	1974–1977
Eric Manuell ^{[1]}	Country Liberal	Alice Springs	1976–1977
Les MacFarlane	Country Liberal	Elsey	1974–1983
Marshall Perron	Country Liberal	Stuart Park	1974–1995
Dave Pollock	Country Liberal	MacDonnell	1974–1977
Jim Robertson	Country Liberal	Gillen	1974–1986
Roger Ryan	Country Liberal	Millner	1974–1977
Roger Steele	Country Liberal	Ludmilla	1974–1990
Grant Tambling	Country Liberal	Fannie Bay	1974–1977
Hyacinth Tungutalum	Country Liberal	Tiwi	1974–1977
Ian Tuxworth	Country Liberal	Barkly	1974–1990
Roger Vale	Country Liberal	Stuart	1974–1994
Ron Withnall	Independent	Port Darwin	1974–1977

^{1} CLP member Bernie Kilgariff resigned to contest a seat in the Australian Senate on 16 July 1975; CLP candidate Eric Manuell won the resulting by-election on 7 February 1976.

== See also ==
- 1974 Northern Territory general election
