= Minister for Education (Northern Territory) =

- Incumbent; Selena Uibo since 12 September 2016
- Department of Education
- Style: The Honourable
- Appointer: Administrator of the Northern Territory

The Northern Territory Minister for Education is a Minister of the Crown in the Government of the Northern Territory. The minister administers their portfolio through the Department of Education.

The Minister is responsible for planning, development and administration of schools, vocational education and training in schools, teacher registration, the regulation of the teaching profession, early years education and care services and regulation, distance education, the approval and accreditation of higher education institutions and courses, grants for educational organisations, and student assistance schemes. They are also responsible for the Charles Darwin University and the Batchelor Institute of Indigenous Tertiary Education.

The current minister is Selena Uibo (Labor). She was appointed in a reshuffle in June 2018.

== List of ministers for education ==
Minister	Party	Term	Ministerial title
Liz Andrew	Country Liberal	November 1974 – November 1975	Executive Member for Education and Consumer Services
Liz Andrew	Country Liberal	November 1974 – November 1975	Executive Member for Education and Law
Marshall Perron	Country Liberal	December 1976 – September 1977	Executive Member for Education and Planning
September 1977 - June 1978: no minister – responsibilities held by Executive Member for Community and Social Development
Jim Robertson	Country Liberal	1 July 1978 – 30 November 1982	Minister for Education
Marshall Perron	Country Liberal	1 December 1982 – 12 December 1983	Minister for Education
Tom Harris	Country Liberal	13 December 1983 – 28 April 1986	Minister for Education
Daryl Manzie	Country Liberal	29 April 1986 – 20 December 1987	Minister for Education
Ray Hanrahan	Country Liberal	21 December 1987 – 5 April 1988	Minister for Education
Tom Harris	Country Liberal	6 April 1988 – 3 September 1989	Minister for Education
Tom Harris	Country Liberal	4 September 1989 – 12 November 1990	Minister for Education, the Arts and Cultural Affairs
Shane Stone	Country Liberal	13 November 1990 to 19 December 1991	Minister for Education and the Arts
Shane Stone	Country Liberal	20 December 1991 to 29 November 1992	Minister for Education and Training
Fred Finch	Country Liberal	30 November 1992 – 30 June 1995	Minister for Education and Training
Stephen Hatton	Country Liberal	1 July 1995 – 20 June 1996	Minister for Education and Training
Fred Finch	Country Liberal	21 June 1996 – 1 July 1997	Minister for Education and Training
Peter Adamson	Country Liberal	2 July 1997 – 7 December 1998	Minister for Education and Training
Peter Adamson	Country Liberal	8 December 1998 – 30 January 2000	Minister for School Education; Minister for Tertiary Education and Training
Chris Lugg	Country Liberal	31 January 2000 – 26 August 2001	Minister for School Education; Minister for Tertiary Education and Training
Syd Stirling	Labor	27 August 2001 – 12 November 2001	Minister for Education, Employment and Training
Syd Stirling	Labor	13 November 2001 – 31 August 2006	Minister for Employment, Education and Training
Paul Henderson	Labor	1 September 2006 – 29 November 2007	Minister for Employment, Education and Training
Marion Scrymgour	Labor	30 November 2007 – 17 August 2008	Minister for Employment, Education and Training
Marion Scrymgour	Labor	18 August 2008 – 3 February 2009	Minister for Education and Training
Paul Henderson	Labor	4 February 2009 – 3 December 2009	Minister for Education and Training
Chris Burns	Labor	4 December 2009 – 28 August 2012	Minister for Education and Training
Robyn Lambley	Country Liberal	29 August 2012 – 3 September 2012	Minister for Education and Training
Robyn Lambley	Country Liberal	4 September 2012 – 1 October 2012	Minister for Education
John Elferink	Country Liberal	14 December 2012 – 6 March 2013	Minister for Education
Peter Chandler	Country Liberal	7 March 2013 – 11 December 2014	Minister for Education
Robyn Lambley	Country Liberal	12 December 2014 – 3 February 2015	Minister for Education
John Elferink	Country Liberal	4 February 2015 – 10 February 2015	Minister for Education
Peter Chandler	Country Liberal	11 February 2015 – 27 August 2016	Minister for Education
Michael Gunner	Labor	31 August 2016 – 11 September 2016	Minister for Education
Eva Lawler	Labor	12 September 2016 – 25 June 2018	Minister for Education
Selena Uibo	Labor	26 June 2018 – 7 September 2020	Minister for Education
Lauren Moss	Labor	8 September 2020 – present	Minister for Education
