= Chief Minister of the Northern Territory =

Head of the Northern Territory

- Coat of arms of the Northern Territory

- Flag of the Northern Territory

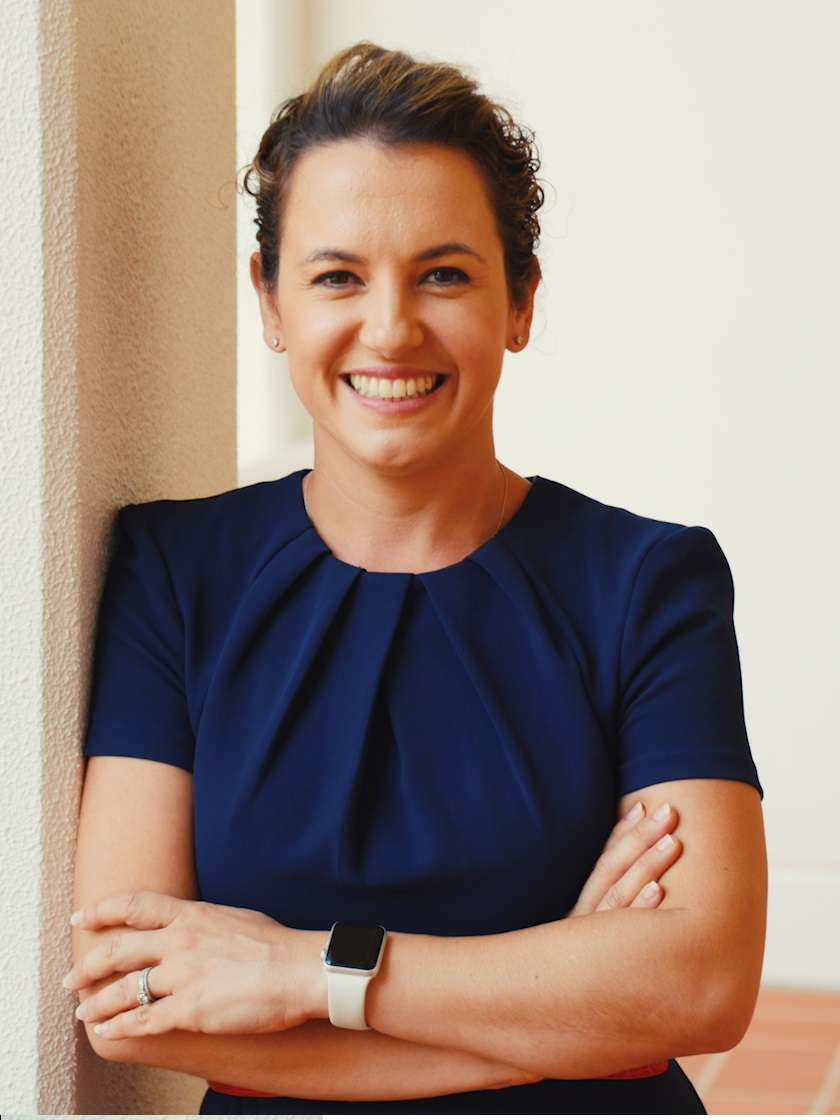
- Incumbent; Lia Finocchiaro since 28 August 2024
- Department of the Chief Minister
- Style: The Honourable
- Type: Head of government
- Status: chief minister of Australia
- Abbreviation: CM
- Member of: Parliament; National Cabinet; Cabinet; Executive Council
- Reports to: Parliament
- Seat: Darwin, Northern Territory
- Appointer: Administrator of the Northern Territory; by convention, based on appointee's ability to command confidence in the Legislative Assembly
- Term length: At the Administrator's pleasure; contingent on the chief minister's ability to command confidence in the house of Parliament
- Constituting instrument: None (constitutional convention)
- Formation: 19 October 1974 as Majority Leader; 1 July 1978 as chief minister
- First holder: Goff Letts as Majority Leader; Paul Everingham as chief minister
- Deputy: Deputy Chief Minister of the Northern Territory
- Salary: A$325,392
- Website: www.chiefminister.nt.gov.au

The chief minister of the Northern Territory is the head of government of the Northern Territory. The office is the equivalent of a state premier. When the Northern Territory Legislative Assembly was created in 1974, the head of government was officially known as majority leader. This title was used in the first parliament (1974–1977) and the first eighteen months of the second. When the Northern Territory acquired limited self-government in 1978, the title of the head of government became chief minister with greatly expanded powers, though still somewhat less than those of a state premier.

The chief minister is formally appointed by the administrator, who in normal circumstances will appoint the head of whichever party holds the majority of seats in the unicameral Legislative Assembly. In times of constitutional crisis, the administrator can appoint someone else as chief minister, though this has never occurred.

Since 28 August 2024, following the 2024 Northern Territory general election, the chief minister is Lia Finocchiaro of the Country Liberal Party. She is the fourth female chief minister of the Northern Territory.

== History ==
The Country Liberal Party won the first Northern Territory election on 19 October 1974 and elected Goff Letts majority leader. He headed an Executive that carried out most of the functions of a ministry at the state level. At the 1977 election Letts lost his seat and party leadership. He was succeeded on 13 August 1977 by Paul Everingham (CLP) as Majority Leader. When the Territory attained self-government on 1 July 1978, Everingham became chief minister and his Executive became a Ministry.

Despite the Majority Leader's title, the Majority Leader's opposite number was not known as Minority Leader but instead the Leader of the Opposition.

In 2001, Clare Martin became the first Labor and female chief minister of the Northern Territory. Until 2004 the conduct of elections and drawing of electoral boundaries was performed by the Northern Territory Electoral Office, a unit of the Department of the chief minister. In March 2004 the independent Northern Territory Electoral Commission was established.

In 2013, Mills was replaced as chief minister and CLP leader by Adam Giles at the 2013 CLP leadership ballot on 13 March to become the first indigenous Australian to lead a state or territory government in Australia.

Following the 2016 election landslide outcome, Labor's Michael Gunner became chief minister; he was the first Chief Minister who was born in the Northern Territory. On 10 May 2022, Gunner announced his intention to resign. On 13 May 2022, Natasha Fyles was elected to the position by the Labor caucus. On 19 December 2023, Fyles resigned following controversy over undeclared shares in mining company South32. On 21 December 2023, Eva Lawler replaced Fyles by a unanimous decision of the Labor caucus.

== List of chief ministers of the Northern Territory ==
From the foundation of the Northern Territory Legislative Assembly in 1974 until the granting of self-government in 1978, the head of government was known as the majority leader:

Political parties

Country Liberal Party (CLP)
Territory Labor Party (TL)

No.	Portrait	Name Electoral division (Birth–Death)	Term of office			Political party	Elected	Executive	Administrator(s)	Ref.
No.	Portrait	Name Electoral division (Birth–Death)	Took office	Left office	Time in office	Political party	Elected	Executive	Administrator(s)	Ref.
1		Goff Letts; MLA for Victoria River (1928–2023)	19 October 1974	12 August 1977	2 years, 297 days	CLP	1974	Letts	Jock Nelson (1973–1975)	
1		Goff Letts; MLA for Victoria River (1928–2023)	19 October 1974	12 August 1977	2 years, 297 days	CLP	1974	Letts	None (1975–1978)	
2		Paul Everingham; MLA for Jingili (born 1943)	13 August 1977	30 June 1978	321 days	CLP	1977	Everingham	None (1975–1978)	
2		Paul Everingham; MLA for Jingili (born 1943)	13 August 1977	30 June 1978	321 days	CLP	1977	Everingham	John England (1978–1981)	

From 1978, the position was known as the chief minister:

No.	Portrait	Name Electoral division (Birth–Death)	Term of office			Political party	Elected	Ministries	Administrator(s)	Ref.
No.	Portrait	Name Electoral division (Birth–Death)	Took office	Left office	Time in office	Political party	Elected	Ministries	Administrator(s)	Ref.
1		Paul Everingham; MLA for Jingili (born 1943)	1 July 1978	15 October 1984	6 years, 106 days	CLP	—	Everingham	John England (1978–1981)	
1		Paul Everingham; MLA for Jingili (born 1943)	1 July 1978	15 October 1984	6 years, 106 days	CLP	1980	Everingham	John England (1978–1981)	
1		Paul Everingham; MLA for Jingili (born 1943)	1 July 1978	15 October 1984	6 years, 106 days	CLP	1980	Everingham	Eric Johnston (1981–1989)	
1		Paul Everingham; MLA for Jingili (born 1943)	1 July 1978	15 October 1984	6 years, 106 days	CLP	1983	Everingham	Eric Johnston (1981–1989)	
2		Ian Tuxworth; MLA for Barkly (1942–2020)	16 October 1984	13 May 1986	1 year, 209 days	CLP	—	Tuxworth	Eric Johnston (1981–1989)	
3		Stephen Hatton; MLA for Nightcliff (born 1948)	14 May 1986	12 July 1988	2 years, 59 days	CLP	—	Hatton	Eric Johnston (1981–1989)	
3		Stephen Hatton; MLA for Nightcliff (born 1948)	14 May 1986	12 July 1988	2 years, 59 days	CLP	1987	Hatton	Eric Johnston (1981–1989)	
4		Marshall Perron; MLA for Fannie Bay (born 1942)	13 July 1988	24 May 1995	6 years, 315 days	CLP	—	Perron	Eric Johnston (1981–1989)	
4		Marshall Perron; MLA for Fannie Bay (born 1942)	13 July 1988	24 May 1995	6 years, 315 days	CLP	—	Perron	James Muirhead (1989–1993)	
4		Marshall Perron; MLA for Fannie Bay (born 1942)	13 July 1988	24 May 1995	6 years, 315 days	CLP	1990	Perron	James Muirhead (1989–1993)	
4		Marshall Perron; MLA for Fannie Bay (born 1942)	13 July 1988	24 May 1995	6 years, 315 days	CLP	1990	Perron	Austin Asche (1993–1997)	
4		Marshall Perron; MLA for Fannie Bay (born 1942)	13 July 1988	24 May 1995	6 years, 315 days	CLP	1994	Perron	Austin Asche (1993–1997)	
5		Shane Stone; MLA for Port Darwin (born 1950)	25 May 1995	7 February 1999	3 years, 258 days	CLP	—	Stone	Austin Asche (1993–1997)	
5		Shane Stone; MLA for Port Darwin (born 1950)	25 May 1995	7 February 1999	3 years, 258 days	CLP	1997	Stone	Austin Asche (1993–1997)	
5		Shane Stone; MLA for Port Darwin (born 1950)	25 May 1995	7 February 1999	3 years, 258 days	CLP	1997	Stone	Neil Conn (1997–2000)	
6		Denis Burke; MLA for Brennan (born 1948)	8 February 1999	27 August 2001	2 years, 200 days	CLP	—	Burke	Neil Conn (1997–2000)	
6		Denis Burke; MLA for Brennan (born 1948)	8 February 1999	27 August 2001	2 years, 200 days	CLP	—	Burke	John Anictomatis (2000–2003)	
7		Clare Martin; MLA for Fannie Bay (born 1952)	27 August 2001	26 November 2007	6 years, 91 days	TL	2001	Martin	John Anictomatis (2000–2003)	
7		Clare Martin; MLA for Fannie Bay (born 1952)	27 August 2001	26 November 2007	6 years, 91 days	TL	2001	Martin	Ted Egan (2003–2007)	
7		Clare Martin; MLA for Fannie Bay (born 1952)	27 August 2001	26 November 2007	6 years, 91 days	TL	2005	Martin	Ted Egan (2003–2007)	
7		Clare Martin; MLA for Fannie Bay (born 1952)	27 August 2001	26 November 2007	6 years, 91 days	TL	2005	Martin	Tom Pauling (2007–2011)	
8		Paul Henderson; MLA for Wanguri (born 1962)	26 November 2007	28 August 2012	4 years, 276 days	TL	—	Henderson	Tom Pauling (2007–2011)	
8		Paul Henderson; MLA for Wanguri (born 1962)	26 November 2007	28 August 2012	4 years, 276 days	TL	2008	Henderson	Tom Pauling (2007–2011)	
8		Paul Henderson; MLA for Wanguri (born 1962)	26 November 2007	28 August 2012	4 years, 276 days	TL	2008	Henderson	Sally Thomas (2011–2014)	
9		Terry Mills; MLA for Blain (born 1957)	29 August 2012	13 March 2013	196 days	CLP	2012	Mills	Sally Thomas (2011–2014)	
10		Adam Giles; MLA for Braitling (born 1973)	14 March 2013	30 August 2016	3 years, 169 days	CLP	—	Giles	Sally Thomas (2011–2014)	
10		Adam Giles; MLA for Braitling (born 1973)	14 March 2013	30 August 2016	3 years, 169 days	CLP	—	Giles	John Hardy (2014–2017)	
11		Michael Gunner; MLA for Fannie Bay (born 1976)	31 August 2016	13 May 2022	5 years, 255 days	TL	2016	Gunner	John Hardy (2014–2017)	
11		Michael Gunner; MLA for Fannie Bay (born 1976)	31 August 2016	13 May 2022	5 years, 255 days	TL	2016	Gunner	Vicki O'Halloran (2017–2023)	
11		Michael Gunner; MLA for Fannie Bay (born 1976)	31 August 2016	13 May 2022	5 years, 255 days	TL	2020	Gunner	Vicki O'Halloran (2017–2023)	
12		Natasha Fyles; MLA for Nightcliff (born 1978)	13 May 2022	21 December 2023	1 year, 222 days	TL	—	Fyles	Vicki O'Halloran (2017–2023)	
12		Natasha Fyles; MLA for Nightcliff (born 1978)	13 May 2022	21 December 2023	1 year, 222 days	TL	—	Fyles	Hugh Heggie (since 2023)	
13		Eva Lawler; MLA for Drysdale (born 1962)	21 December 2023	28 August 2024	251 days	TL	—	Lawler	Hugh Heggie (since 2023)	
14		Lia Finocchiaro; MLA for Spillett (born 1984)	28 August 2024	Incumbent	2 years, 64 days	CLP	2024	Finocchiaro	Hugh Heggie (since 2023)	

== See also ==
- List of chief ministers of the Northern Territory by time in office
- Territory rig
