= Tom Harris (Australian politician) =

Australian politician

Tom Harris (born 1 January 1940) is a former Australian politician. He was the Country Liberal Party member for Port Darwin in the Northern Territory Legislative Assembly from 1977 to 1990.

Northern Territory Legislative Assembly
Years	Term	Electoral division	Party
1977–1980	2nd	Port Darwin	Country Liberal
1980–1983	3rd	Port Darwin	Country Liberal
1983–1987	4th	Port Darwin	Country Liberal
1987–1990	5th	Port Darwin	Country Liberal

He was a minister in the Everingham, Tuxworth, Hatton and Perron governments, serving as Minister for Education (1983–1986), Minister for Health and Minister for Housing (1986–1987), Minister for Labour and Administrative Services (1987), Minister for Education and Minister Assisting the Chief Minister on Constitutional Development (1988–1989) and Minister for Education, the Arts and Cultural Affairs (1989–1990).

Northern Territory Legislative Assembly
Preceded by Ron Withnall	Member for Port Darwin; 1977–1990	Succeeded by Shane Stone
