= Goff Letts =

Australian politician (1928–2023)

Goff Letts CBE, AM
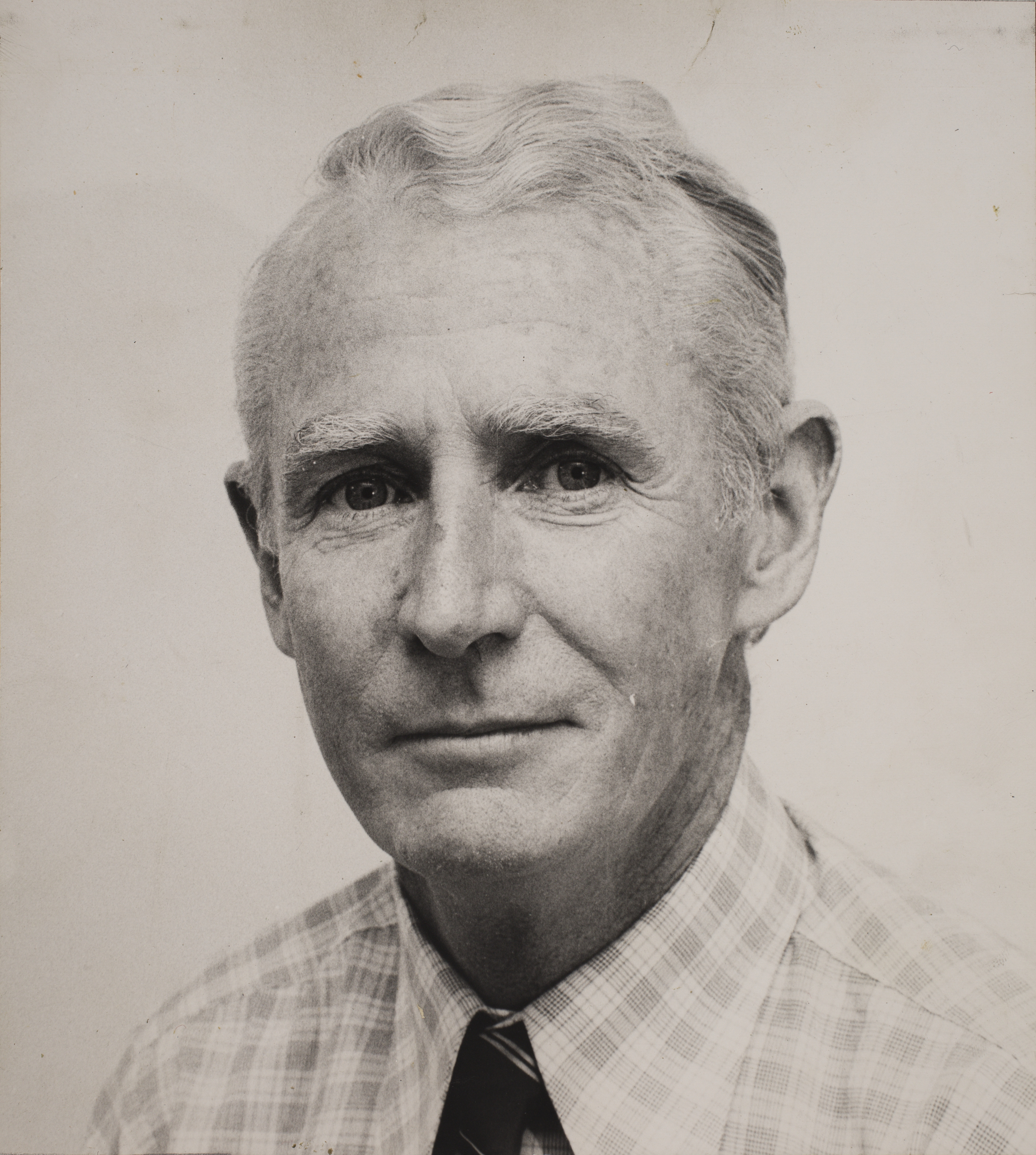

1st Majority Leader of the Northern Territory
- In office 19 October 1974 – 12 August 1977
- Deputy: Paul Everingham (1974–1975); Bernie Kilgariff (1975); Grant Tambling (1975–1977)
- Preceded by: Office created
- Succeeded by: Paul Everingham

Member of the Northern Territory Parliament for Victoria River
- In office 1974–1977
- Preceded by: First holder
- Succeeded by: Jack Doolan

Personal details
- Born: Godfrey Alan Letts; 18 January 1928 Donald, Victoria, Australia
- Died: 10 March 2023 (aged 95) Stawell, Victoria, Australia
- Party: Country (1966–1974); CLP (1974–1981); Independent (1981–2023)
- Cabinet: Letts Executive

Godfrey Alan "Goff" Letts CBE AM (18 January 1928 – 10 March 2023) was the Majority Leader of the Northern Territory of Australia from 1974 to 1977.

Northern Territory Legislative Assembly
Years	Term	Electoral division	Party
1974–1977	1st	Victoria River	Country Liberal

== Biography ==
Born in Donald, Victoria, Letts attended Melbourne Grammar and Melbourne and Sydney Universities, graduating with a Bachelor of Veterinary Science in 1950. Letts gained employment with the Victorian Department of Agriculture and married Joyce Crosby on 29 November 1952. Together they had three sons and three daughters.

Letts moved to the Northern Territory in 1957, initially working in Alice Springs before transferring to Darwin as the District Veterinary Officer for the Northern Region of the Northern Territory. He was appointed Director of the Animal Industry and Agriculture Branch of the Northern Territory in 1963, Chair of the Northern Territory Wildlife Council and to the Northern Territory Lands Board in 1964. Awarded a Churchill Fellowship in 1966, Letts was appointed to the Northern Territory Legislative Council in 1967 as an official (non-elected) member representing the Department of Lands and Primary Industry. His growing disillusionment with the bureaucratic control of the Territory from Canberra led him to resign from those positions in 1970 to enter private industry as a vet.

A founding member of the Northern Territory branch of the Country Party in 1966, Letts' high political profile in the Territory led him to successfully contest the Legislative Council seat of Victoria River for the Country Party at the 1971 elections, and subsequently become leader of the Country Party in the Council. Following the announcement of the creation of the Northern Territory Legislative Assembly to replace the Council, Letts helped merge the Territory's Country and Liberal parties into the Country Liberal Party, and led the CLP to victory at the 1974 election, winning 17 of 19 seats. He was elected Majority Leader—the equivalent of a first minister in the federal and state governments.

As Majority Leader, Letts prepared the Territory for self-government, which was to be granted in 1978, and administered the day-to-day running of Territory affairs. Although his powers were limited, he was generally considered a capable leader. It was therefore surprising when he lost his seat at the 1977 election, even though the CLP was returned with a comfortable majority. Letts' ousting was particularly surprising given that it is almost unheard of for major-party leaders at the federal, state or territory level in Australia to lose their own seat. Letts blamed his defeat on his long absences from his remote electorate on Majority Leader business. His original Deputy Majority Leader, Paul Everingham, was elected CLP leader and Majority Leader in his place, and thus presided over the final transition to self-government a year later. At the 2016 election, Adam Giles followed Letts in becoming only the second sitting Chief Minister/Majority Leader to lose their seat.

Following his departure from politics, Letts served as Chair of the Board of Inquiry into Feral Animals in the Northern Territory from 1978–79, on the Advisory Council to the CSIRO from 1979–83, and on the Uranium Advisory Council from 1979–83.

He was pre-selected by the CLP to contest the Division of Northern Territory at the 1980 federal election but withdrew to accept the position of CEO of the Northern Territory Conservation Commission. Letts's former deputy, Grant Tambling, was then pre-selected as the new candidate and was successful at that election.

Made a Trustee of the World Wildlife Fund in 1981, Letts resigned from his position at the Conservation Commission in 1983 to stand as an independent for the Alice Springs-based seat of Araluen at the 1983 Territory election, in opposition to the CLP's attitudes towards the Commonwealth and Indigenous people. Letts was defeated by the CLP candidate Jim Robertson, achieving 20% of the vote to Robertson's 61.7%. Following this defeat, Letts left the Territory to work in his family's newspaper business in Victoria.

Known as the "father of self-government", Letts was appointed a CBE in 1978 for his services to the Territory and public administration.

Letts died on 10 March 2023 in Stawell, Victoria, at the age of 95.

Political offices
New title	Majority Leader of the Northern Territory; 1974–1977	Succeeded by Paul Everingham
