= 1977 Northern Territory general election =

- 13 August 1977

All 19 seats of the Northern Territory Legislative Assembly 10 seats needed for a majority
- Turnout: 75.9 (▲0.5 pp)
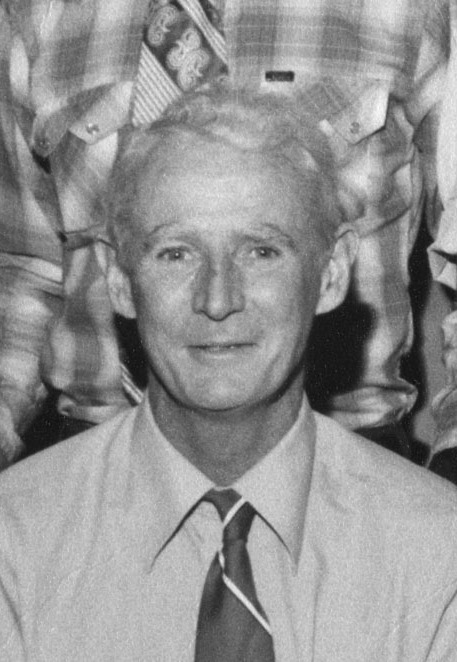

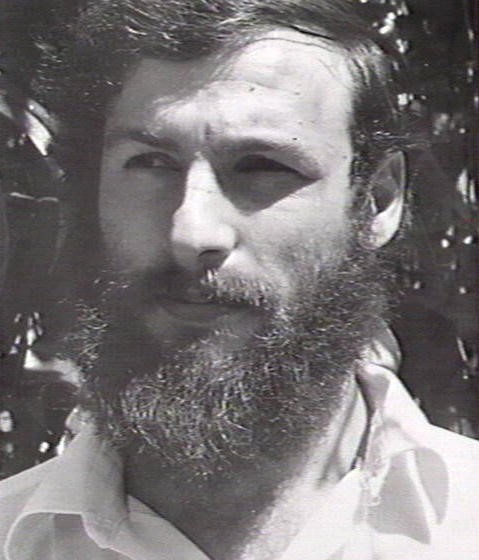
	First party	Second party
Leader	Goff Letts	Jon Isaacs
Party	Country Liberal	Labor
Leader since	19 October 1974	–
Leader's seat	Victoria River (lost seat)	None (won Millner)
Last election	17 seats	0 seats
Seats won	12	6
Seat change	▼5	▲6
Popular vote	12,769	12,165
Percentage	40.1%	38.2%
Swing	▼8.9	▲7.7
Majority Leader before election
Goff Letts
Country Liberal
Elected Majority Leader
Paul Everingham
Country Liberal

A general election was held in the Northern Territory on Saturday 13 August 1977. Though the election was won by the incumbent Country Liberal Party (CLP), the party lost five of its seven executive members. Surprisingly, one of the casualties was Majority Leader Goff Letts—one of the few instances where a major-party leader at any level in Australia lost his own seat. The election also marked the emergence of the Labor Party as a parliamentary force: Labor took six seats in the new assembly.

The Progress Party contested the elections, winning 9.76% of the primary vote across the territory, but failed to secure any assembly seats.

The Country Liberals chose Paul Everingham to succeed Letts as Majority Leader. Everingham appointed a new Executive, which included future Chief Ministers Marshall Perron and Ian Tuxworth. The following year, the Territory attained self-government. Everingham became Chief Minister, while his Executive became a Ministry with greatly expanded powers.

Independent Dawn Lawrie retained her seat of Nightcliff at this election, while Ron Withnall lost his seat of Port Darwin to the CLP.

== Retiring MPs ==
=== CLP ===
- Eric Manuell MLA (Alice Springs)
- Hyacinth Tungutalum MLA (Tiwi)

== Results ==
↓
12	1	6
CLP	Ind	Labor

Summary of the results of the 1977 Northern Territory general election, Legislative Assembly
Party	Votes	%	+/–	Seats	+/–
Country Liberal	12,769	40.13	▼8.88	12	▼5
Labor	12,165	38.23	▲7.77	6	▲6
Independents	3,718	11.69	▼8.85	1	▼1
Progress	3,104	9.76	New	0	Steady
Communist	61	0.19	▲0.19	0	Steady
Total	31,817	100.00	–	19	–
Valid votes	31,817	96.82			
Invalid/blank votes	1,044	3.18	▼1.89		
Total votes	32,861	100.00	–		
Registered voters/turnout	43,284	75.92	▲0.52		

Popular vote
Country Liberal	40.1%
Labor	38.2%
Progress	9.8%
Communist	0.2%
Independents	11.7%

Seats
Country Liberal	63.2%
Labor	31.6%
Independents	5.3%

== Candidates ==
Sitting members are listed in bold. Successful candidates are highlighted in the relevant colour. Where there is possible confusion, an asterisk is used.

Electorate	Held by	Labor	CLP	Progress	Other
Alice Springs	CLP	Rosalie McDonald	Rod Oliver	Brian Evans	
Arnhem	CLP	Bob Collins	**Rupert Kentish**	Phillip Brain	
Barkly	CLP	Jean Havnen	**Ian Tuxworth**	Neville Andrews	Margaret Conway; Billy Foster
Casuarina	CLP	Dennis Bree	**Nick Dondas**	Robert Hoey	
Elsey	CLP		**Les MacFarlane**	Deidre Killen	Davis Daniels; Patricia Davies
Fannie Bay	CLP	Pam O'Neil	**Grant Tambling**	Edward Osgood	William Fisher
Gillen	CLP	John Thomas	**Jim Robertson**	Peter Johncock	
Jingili	CLP	Diana Rickard	**Paul Everingham**	David Cooper	John McCormack; George Tarasidis
Ludmilla	CLP	Christopher Draffin	**Roger Steele**	Terry Johnson	
Macdonnell	CLP	Neville Perkins	**Dave Pollock**	Mark Fidler	
Millner	CLP	Jon Isaacs	**Roger Ryan**	Elva Pearce	
Nhulunbuy	CLP	Denise Fincham	**Milton Ballantyne**	Jacob De Vries	
Nightcliff	Independent		Ronald Nobbs	Uldis Blums	**Dawn Lawrie**
Port Darwin	Independent	Michael Scott	Tom Harris	Ian Smith	Brian Manning; **Ron Withnall**
Sanderson	CLP	June D'Rozario	**Liz Andrew**	Geoffrey Bennett	Kitty Fischer; Herbert Sinclair
Stuart	CLP	Trevor Cutter	**Roger Vale**	Kenneth Kitto	
Stuart Park	CLP	Judith Muras	**Marshall Perron**	Kenneth Day	Ernest Chin
Tiwi	CLP	Harry Maschke; Bernard Tipiloura	Noel Padgham-Purich*; Cyril Rioli	George Ryan	Terrence O'Brien; Strider
Victoria River	CLP	Jack Doolan	**Goff Letts**	Frank Favaro	

== Seats changing hands ==
Seat	Pre-1977			Swing	Post-1977		
Seat	Party	Member	Margin	Swing	Margin	Member	Party
Arnhem	Country Liberal	Rupert Kentish	16.9	34.1	17.2	Bob Collins	Labor
Fannie Bay	Country Liberal	Grant Tambling	N/A	N/A	1.1	Pam O'Neil	Labor
Macdonnell	Country Liberal	Dave Pollock	7.9	20.8	13.8	Neville Perkins	Labor
Millner	Country Liberal	Roger Ryan	14.3	26.5	12.2	Jon Isaacs	Labor
Port Darwin	Independent	Ron Withnall	3.3	13.8	10.5	Tom Harris	Country Liberal
Sanderson	Country Liberal	Liz Andrew	6.5	14.8	8.3	June D'Rozario	Labor
Victoria River	Country Liberal	Goff Letts	19.7	23.4	3.7	Jack Doolan	Labor

== See also ==
- Everingham Executive
- First Everingham Ministry
- Second Everingham Ministry
- Third Everingham Ministry
- Fourth Everingham Ministry
