= Electoral division of Stuart Park =

Electoral division of the Northern Territory, Australia

Stuart Park was an electoral division of the Legislative Assembly in Australia's Northern Territory. One of the Legislative Assembly's original electorates, it was first contested at the 1974 election, and was abolished in 1983. It was named after the Darwin suburb of Stuart Park.

== Members for Stuart Park ==
Member	Party	Term
Marshall Perron	Country Liberal	1974–1983

== Election results ==
=== Elections in the 1970s ===
1974 Northern Territory general election: Stuart Park
Party	Candidate	Votes	%	±%
Country Liberal	Marshall Perron	557	33.0	
Independent	William Fisher; John McNamee	646	38.3	
Labor	Geoffrey Loveday	486	28.8	
Total formal votes		1,689	95.5	
Informal votes		79	4.5	
Turnout		1,768	74.1	
Two-candidate-preferred result
Country Liberal	Marshall Perron	763	50.2	
Independent		757	49.8	
Country Liberal win		(new seat)		

- The number of votes each individual Independent received is unknown.
- The independent candidate that came second on preferences is unknown.

1977 Northern Territory general election: Stuart Park
Party	Candidate	Votes	%	±%
Country Liberal	Marshall Perron	652	40.7	
Labor	Judith Muras	491	30.7	
Independent	Ernest Chin	267	16.7	
Progress	Kenneth Day	191	11.9	
Total formal votes		1,601	97.8	
Informal votes		36	2.2	
Turnout		1,637	73.9	
Two-party-preferred result
Country Liberal	Marshall Perron	902	56.3	
Labor	Judith Muras	699	43.7	
Country Liberal hold		Swing		

=== Elections in the 1980s ===
1980 Northern Territory general election: Stuart Park
Party	Candidate	Votes	%	±%
Country Liberal	Marshall Perron	952	56.1	+15.4
Labor	Peter Cavanagh	610	36.0	+5.3
Independent	Terry Wilson	79	4.7	+4.7
Marijuana	John Duffy	55	3.2	+3.2
Total formal votes		1,696	97.9	
Informal votes		36	2.1	
Turnout		1,732	78.8	
Country Liberal hold		Swing	N/A	

- Preferences were not distributed.
