= Paul Everingham =

Australian politician (born 1943)

Paul Everingham AO
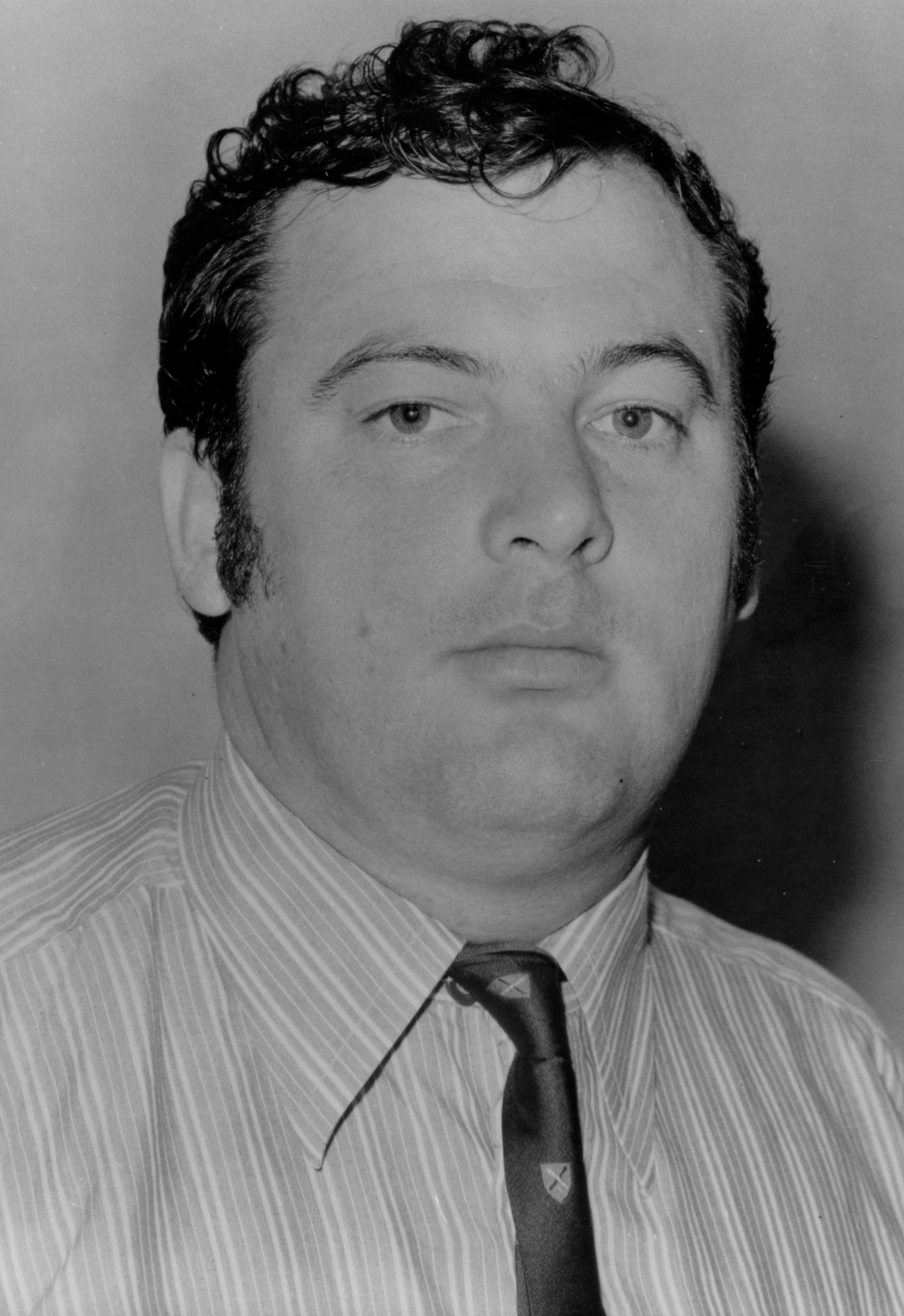

Member of the Australian Parliament for Northern Territory
- In office 1 December 1984 – 5 June 1987
- Preceded by: John Reeves
- Succeeded by: Warren Snowdon

1st Chief Minister of the Northern Territory
- In office 1 July 1978 – 15 October 1984
- Deputy: Marshall Perron (1978–1983); Nick Dondas (1983–1984)
- Preceded by: Himself as Majority Leader
- Succeeded by: Ian Tuxworth

2nd Majority Leader of the Northern Territory
- In office 13 August 1977 – 30 June 1978
- Deputy: Marshall Perron
- Preceded by: Goff Letts
- Succeeded by: Himself as Chief Minister

Member of the Northern Territory Parliament for Jingili
- In office 19 October 1974 – 22 October 1984
- Preceded by: First member
- Succeeded by: Rick Setter

Personal details
- Born: 4 February 1943 (age 83) Brisbane, Queensland, Australia
- Party: Country Liberal Party; Liberal Party
- Children: 4
- Profession: Barrister, solicitor
- Cabinet: Everingham Ministry

Paul Anthony Edward Everingham AO (born 4 February 1943) is a former Australian politician who was the head of government of the Northern Territory of Australia from 1977 to 1984, serving as the second and last Majority Leader (1977–1978) and the first Chief Minister of the Northern Territory from 1978 to 1984. He represented the northern Darwin seat of Jingili in the Northern Territory Legislative Assembly from 1974 to 1984. He was then elected to the federal House of Representatives, representing the Northern Territory between 1984 and 1987.

He was a member of the Country Liberal Party while in territory and federal parliament, and sat with the Liberal Party in federal parliament. After federal parliament, he continued to be a member of the Liberal Party and was the president of the Queensland state division of the party.

== Territory politics ==
Northern Territory Legislative Assembly
Years	Term	Electoral division	Party
1974–1977	1st	Jingili	Country Liberal
1977–1980	2nd	Jingili	Country Liberal
1980–1983	3rd	Jingili	Country Liberal
1983–1984	4th	Jingili	Country Liberal

Everingham was elected to the northern Darwin seat of Jingili in the newly created Northern Territory Legislative Assembly in October 1974. He briefly served as Deputy Majority Leader (the equivalent of a deputy premier in the states) under Goff Letts from 1974 to 1975. He remained on the backbench for the remainder of the First Assembly.

Just months after being re-elected to the legislature, he was named leader of the CLP and Majority Leader after Letts was unexpectedly defeated in his own electorate despite the CLP comfortably winning another term in government. He thus oversaw the transition to self-government, which occurred in 1978. At that time, he became Chief Minister with greatly expanded powers. As the second and longest-serving head of government in the Territory, he led the CLP to comprehensive election victories in 1980 and 1983. During his tenure, the Northern Territory was essentially a one-party state; he never faced more than seven opposition MLAs.

Everingham was sworn in as Majority Leader at the age of 34 years, five months and nine days; he is still the youngest-ever head of government in Territory history.

== Federal politics ==
In October 1984, Everingham resigned as CLP leader and from the Legislative Assembly to seek election to the Australian House of Representatives for the Division of Northern Territory in the upcoming 1984 federal election. He was initially heavily favoured against Labor incumbent John Reeves. However, Reeves significantly closed the gap during the campaign. On election day, the race was very close, but Everingham's first-count lead proved too much for Reeves to overcome. He was elected on the fourth count, winning by 1,800 votes.

After his election, both the Liberal and National parties sought his membership in federal parliament. In December 1984, Everingham declared he would sit with the Liberal Party. Reflecting on his service as Northern Territory Chief Minister, Everingham was immediately appointed to the Opposition frontbench by Liberal leader Andrew Peacock as Shadow Minister for Local Government and Northern Development. He was a member of the shadow ministry until September 1985 when Peacock was replaced as Liberal leader by John Howard. It was reported that Everingham supported Peacock in the latter's attempt to retain party leadership, and Howard reportedly had a "low opinion" of Everingham's ability and hence dumping the latter from the shadow ministry.

It was reported in December 1985 that Everingham and his family had planned to move to Brisbane. He retired at the 1987 election.

== Post-federal politics ==
After his time in the House of Representatives, Everingham served as President of the Queensland Liberal Party from 1990 to 1994. He resigned as Queensland Liberal President in 1994 in abrupt circumstances. He had supported a merger of the Liberal and National Parties in Queensland but negotiations on this broke down. Liberal officials denied this was the reason for his resignation. The two parties would eventually merge in 2008 into the Liberal National Party of Queensland.

In 2019, Everingham and two other former CLP chief ministers, Marshall Perron and Shane Stone, called for "fresh blood" to replace retiring CLP senator Nigel Scullion.

Political offices
Preceded by Goff Letts	Majority Leader of the Northern Territory; 1977–1978	Succeeded by Himself as Chief Minister
Preceded by Himself as Majority Leader	Chief Minister of the Northern Territory; 1978–1984	Succeeded by Ian Tuxworth
Parliament of Australia
Preceded by John Reeves	Member for Northern Territory; 1984–1987	Succeeded by Warren Snowdon
