= Marshall Perron =

Australian politician

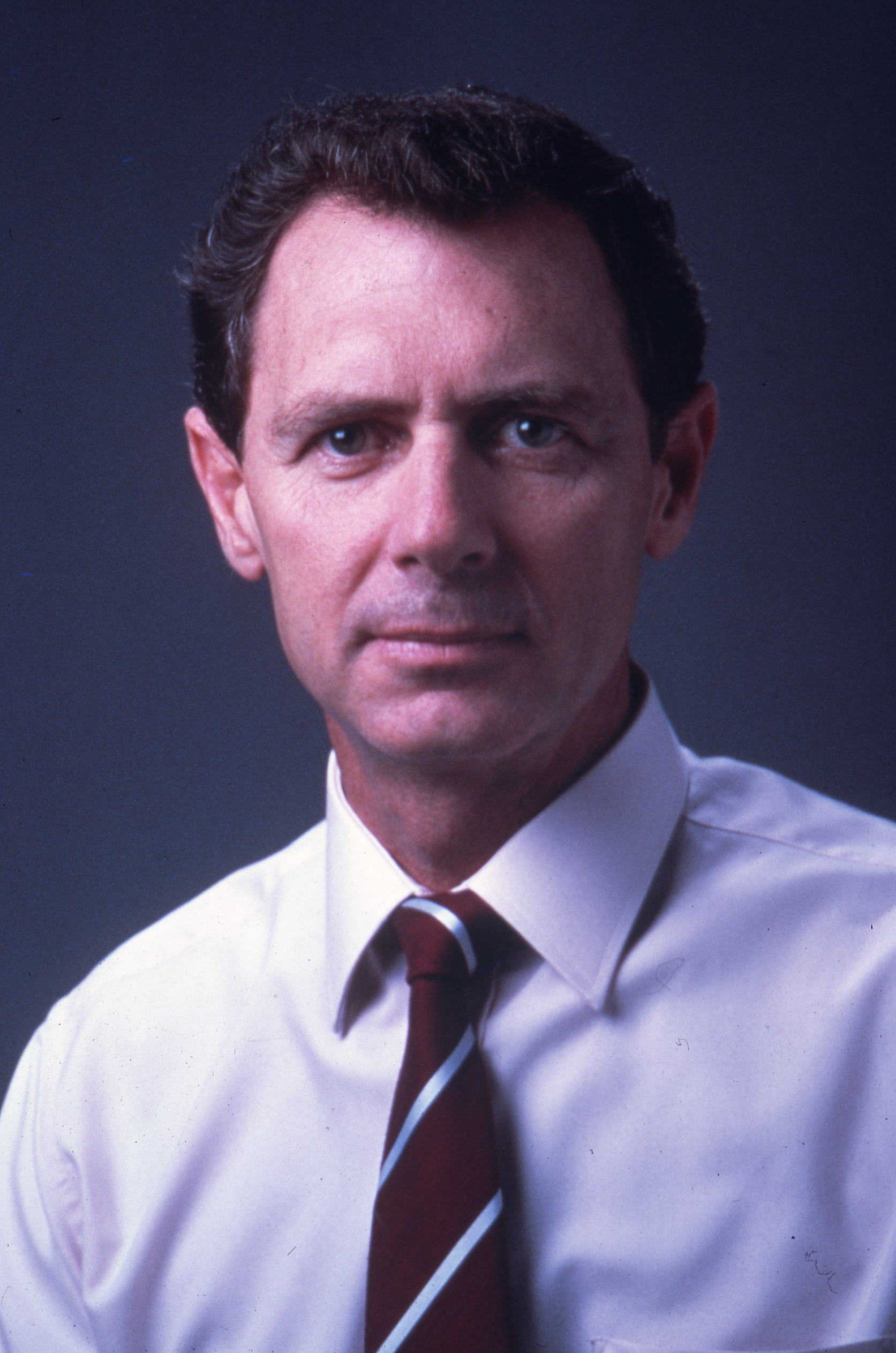

4th Chief Minister of the Northern Territory
- In office 14 July 1988 – 26 May 1995
- Deputy: Barry Coulter
- Preceded by: Stephen Hatton
- Succeeded by: Shane Stone
- Constituency: Fannie Bay

Personal details
- Born: 5 February 1942 (age 84) Perth, Western Australia
- Party: Country Liberal Party
- Spouse: Cherry Perron
- Cabinet: Perron Ministry

Marshall Bruce Perron (born 5 February 1942) is a former Australian politician, who was Chief Minister of the Northern Territory from 1988 to 1995. He served as a Country Liberal Party member of the Legislative Assembly in the Northern Territory from the formation of the Assembly in 1974 until his resignation in 1995. From 1975 to 1995, save for an 11-month break in 1986 and 1987, he served as a cabinet minister or its equivalent.

== Early life ==
Perron was born in Perth, Western Australia in 1942. His family was from Darwin, but had been evacuated to Perth due to the threat of Japanese attack during World War II. Perron was born on 5 February, two weeks before the bombing of Darwin, and he would later jokingly blame "the Japanese for denying him his birthright as a Territorian."

== Political career ==
Northern Territory Legislative Assembly
Years	Term	Electoral division	Party
1974–1977	1st	Stuart Park	Country Liberal
1977–1980	2nd	Stuart Park	Country Liberal
1980–1983	3rd	Stuart Park	Country Liberal
1983–1987	4th	Fannie Bay	Country Liberal
1987–1990	5th	Fannie Bay	Country Liberal
1990–1994	6th	Fannie Bay	Country Liberal
1994–1995	7th	Fannie Bay	Country Liberal

Perron entered politics in 1974, when he was elected as a member of the first Northern Territory Legislative Assembly, which replaced the partly elected Legislative Council. He represented the division of Stuart Park for the Country Liberal Party.

After surviving Cyclone Tracy, a year later, Perron was promoted to cabinet. As self-government was not granted to the Northern Territory until 1978, until then the ministers under Majority Leaders Goff Letts and Paul Everingham were known as Executive Members. Perron joined Letts' executive in December 1975 as Executive Member for Municipal and Consumer Affairs and Cabinet Member for Education and Planning from 1976 to 1977.

After the 1977 election, Perron was named deputy leader of the CLP under Everingham, and hence became Deputy Majority Leader (deputy premier), also taking the Finance and Planning portfolio. From 1 July 1978, when self-government came into effect, Perron became Deputy Chief Minister, Treasurer and Minister for Lands and Housing until 1980 when he took the Industrial Development and Community Development portfolios instead of Lands and Housing, although he regained that position in 1982.

In 1982, Stuart Park was abolished in a redistribution, even as the size of the Assembly was increased from 19 to 25 seats. In the 1983 election, Perron stood for election in the division of Fannie Bay, which had absorbed most of Stuart Park in the redistribution. He won the seat from the incumbent Labor Party candidate Pam O'Neil.

In December 1984, Chief Minister Ian Tuxworth took on Perron's role as Treasurer, with Perron taking the position of Attorney-General and Minister for Mines and Energy. Perron was Attorney-General when the discovery of a matinee jacket near Ayers Rock (Uluru) raised doubts about the conviction of Lindy Chamberlain for the alleged murder of her infant daughter Azaria. Perron announced Chamberlain's immediate release from prison, and the establishment of a Royal Commission into the convictions of Lindy and her husband Michael. Perron returned to the backbench in May 1986, but returned in 1987 as Minister for Industries and Development under Stephen Hatton.

Perron became Chief Minister on 14 July 1988, after having rejected previous offers for the position. He also served as his own Treasurer, and was Minister for Police, Fire and Emergency Services from September 1989 until July 1994. He stayed in office for just under seven years, longer than any head of government in the Territory except Everingham. He restored a measure of stability to the government, which had seen three Chief Ministers in four years.

Perron faced his first electoral test at the 1990 Territory election. Although independent polls suggested that Labor had its first realistic chance of winning power since the granting of self-government, the election saw the CLP win its sixth term in government with a healthy nine-percent primary vote swing. CLP-commissioned polls conducted by social researcher Mark Textor predicted the CLP would win comfortably. He was reelected almost as easily in 1994.

An advocate for voluntary euthanasia, Perron was instrumental in devising the Rights of the Terminally Ill Bill which he introduced to Parliament on 22 February 1995. The bill was passed on 25 May, becoming the Rights of the Terminally Ill Act 1995 and was enacted into law on 1 July 1996. Perron resigned as Chief Minister and retired from politics on the morning of the debate over the bill, maintaining that he did not want his position to influence the debate. He was the last surviving member of the first Legislative Assembly.

== See also ==
- Perron Ministry

Political offices
Preceded by Stephen Hatton	Chief Minister of the Northern Territory; 1988–1995	Succeeded by Shane Stone
Northern Territory Legislative Assembly
Division created	Member for Stuart Park; 1974–1983	Division abolished
Preceded by Pam O'Neil	Member for Fannie Bay; 1983–1995	Succeeded by Clare Martin
Party political offices
Preceded by Stephen Hatton	Leader of the Country Liberal Party; 1988–1995	Succeeded by Shane Stone
