= Electoral division of Gillen =

Former electoral division of the Northern Territory

Gillen was an electoral division of the Legislative Assembly in Australia's Northern Territory. It existed between 1974 and 1983, and was named after Francis James Gillen, an Australian anthropologist.

== Members for Gillen ==
Member	Party	Term
Jim Robertson	Country Liberal	1974–1983

== Election results ==
=== Elections in the 1970s ===
1974 Northern Territory general election: Gillen
Party	Candidate	Votes	%	±%
Country Liberal	Jim Robertson	1,128	65.7	
Labor	Peter Leunig	589	34.3	
Total formal votes		1,717	90.2	
Informal votes		187	9.8	
Turnout		1,904	82.5	
Country Liberal win		(new seat)		

1977 Northern Territory general election: Gillen
Party	Candidate	Votes	%	±%
Country Liberal	Jim Robertson	1,035	49.9	
Labor	John Thomas	808	39.0	
Progress	Peter Johncock	231	11.1	
Total formal votes		2,074	97.6	
Informal votes		50	2.4	
Turnout		2,124	79.9	
Two-party-preferred result
Country Liberal	Jim Robertson	1,216	58.6	
Labor	John Thomas	858	41.4	
Country Liberal hold		Swing		

=== Elections in the 1980s ===
1980 Northern Territory general election: Gillen
Party	Candidate	Votes	%	±%
Country Liberal	Jim Robertson	1,539	68.7	+18.8
Labor	Rosalie McDonald	701	31.3	−7.7
Total formal votes		2,240	96.2	
Informal votes		88	3.8	
Turnout		2,328	81.3	
Country Liberal hold		Swing	N/A	
