= Stephen Hatton =

Australian politician

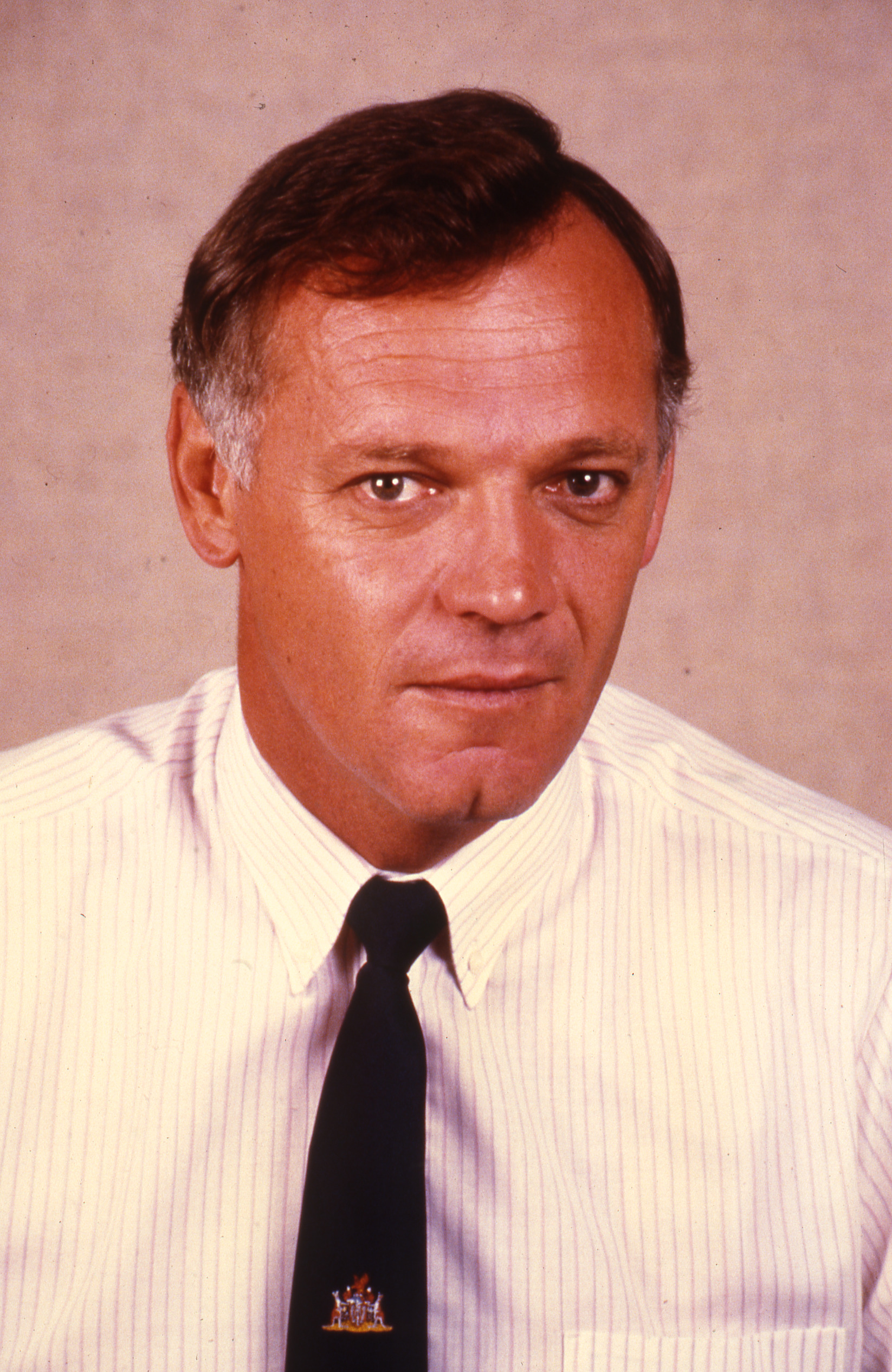

3rd Chief Minister of the Northern Territory
- In office 15 May 1986 – 13 July 1988
- Deputy: Barry Coulter (1986–1987, 1987–1988); Ray Hanrahan (1987)
- Preceded by: Ian Tuxworth
- Succeeded by: Marshall Perron

Member of the Northern Territory Legislative Assembly for Nightcliff
- In office 3 December 1983 – 17 August 2001
- Preceded by: Dawn Lawrie
- Succeeded by: Jane Aagaard

Personal details
- Born: Stephen Paul Hatton; 28 January 1948 (age 78) Sydney, New South Wales, Australia
- Party: Country Liberal Party
- Education: University of New South Wales
- Cabinet: Hatton Ministry

Stephen Paul Hatton (born 28 January 1948) is an Australian politician, who was Chief Minister of the Northern Territory of Australia from 1986 to 1988. From 1983 until his retirement in 2001, he was MLA for the seat of Nightcliff. He first became a minister in December 1984 in the Ian Tuxworth government.

Northern Territory Legislative Assembly
Years	Term	Electoral division	Party
1983–1987	4th	Nightcliff	Country Liberal
1987–1990	5th	Nightcliff	Country Liberal
1990–1994	6th	Nightcliff	Country Liberal
1994–1997	7th	Nightcliff	Country Liberal
1997–2001	8th	Nightcliff	Country Liberal

He played an important role in the referendum for statehood for the Northern Territory in 1998. He had served for many years on a bipartisan committee of the Northern Territory Legislative Assembly, which had recommended a constitution and an elected Constitutional Assembly to give it further consideration. The then Chief Minister, Shane Stone put forward a different constitution to a non-elected Constitutional Assembly. Steve Hatton was prominent in opposing this kind of statehood. The referendum failed, and he was reported as saying "One of the campaign slogans at the time was: 'we want statehood, not Stonehood'".

Northern Territory Legislative Assembly
Preceded by Dawn Lawrie	Member for Nightcliff; 1983–2001	Succeeded by Jane Aagaard
Political offices
Preceded by Ian Tuxworth	Chief Minister of the Northern Territory; 1986–1988	Succeeded by Marshall Perron
Party political offices
Preceded by Ian Tuxworth	Leader of the Country Liberal Party; 1986–1988	Succeeded by Marshall Perron
