= Jim Robertson (politician) =

Australian politician (born 1945)

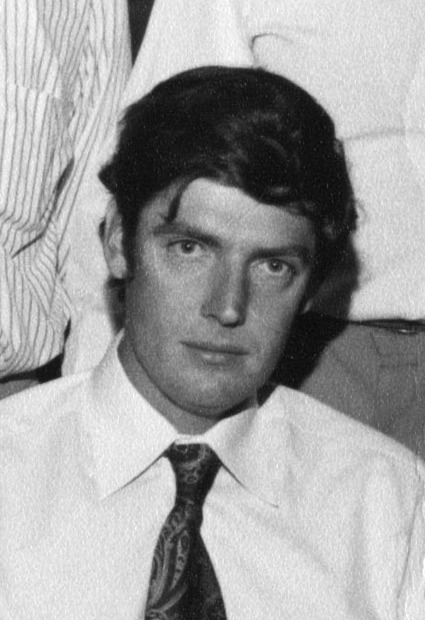
Robertson in 1976

James Murray Robertson (born 16 February 1945) is an Australian former politician.

Robertson was born in Renmark, South Australia, the son of Murray and Anna Robertson of Kapunda, South Australia. Moving to the Northern Territory, he married Mary, daughter of Bert and Mary Baskeyfield on 13 April 1973. One daughter, Hilary Jane, born 14 August 1976 in Alice Springs, Northern Territory. He was a Country Liberal Party member of the Northern Territory Legislative Assembly from 1974 to 1986, representing Gillen until 1983 and Araluen thereafter. Robertson was Attorney-General of the Northern Territory during the first Tuxworth Ministry.

Northern Territory Legislative Assembly
Years	Term	Electoral division	Party
1974–1977	1st	Gillen	Country Liberal
1977–1980	2nd	Gillen	Country Liberal
1980–1983	3rd	Gillen	Country Liberal
1983–1986	4th	Araluen	Country Liberal

Appointments after retiring from the NT Legislative Assembly:

- Chairman of the Northern Territory Grants Commission

- Chairman of the Northern Territory Planning Authority 1989-1996

- NT Representative on the Centenary of Federation Advisory Committee

- Member of the Constitutional Centenary Foundation

- Deputy Chairman NT Statehood Convention 1998

In February 1994, Robertson was appointed by Prime Minister Paul Keating to the Centenary of Federation Advisory Committee. The role of the Committee was to plan centenary-related activities in the years leading up to the Centenary of Federation in 2001.

On 13 May 1997, Her Majesty the Queen approved that Robertson be granted the title 'Honourable' for life.

Northern Territory Legislative Assembly
New seat	Member for Gillen; 1974–1983	Abolished
New seat	Member for Araluen; 1983–1986	Succeeded by Eric Poole
