= Ian Tuxworth =

Australian politician (1942–2020)

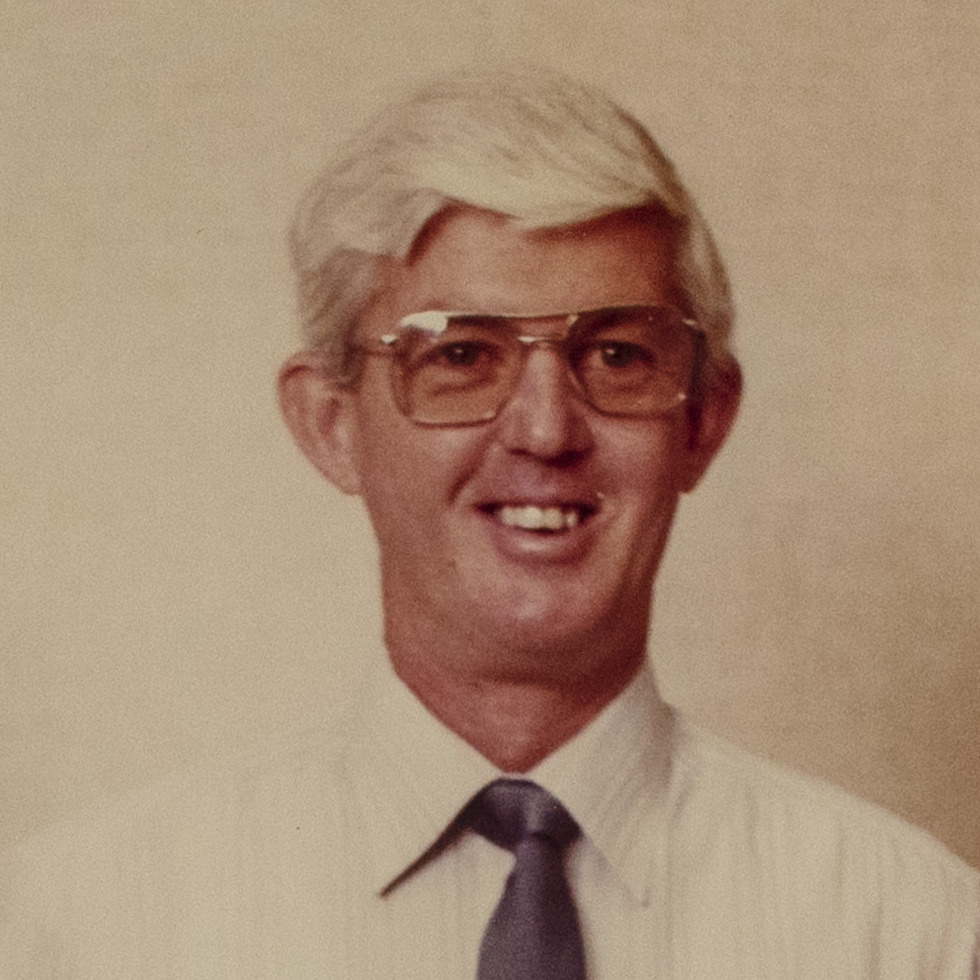
- Tuxworth in 1978

2nd Chief Minister of the Northern Territory
- In office 17 October 1984 – 10 May 1986
- Deputy: Nick Dondas
- Preceded by: Paul Everingham
- Succeeded by: Stephen Hatton

Personal details
- Born: Ian Lindsay Tuxworth; 18 June 1942 Wollongong, New South Wales
- Died: 21 January 2020 (aged 77) Perth, Western Australia
- Party: NT Nationals
- Other political affiliations: Country Liberal Party
- Cabinet: Tuxworth Ministry

Ian Lindsay Tuxworth (18 June 1942 – 21 January 2020) was an Australian politician, who was Chief Minister of the Northern Territory of Australia from 17 October 1984 until his resignation on 10 May 1986.

== Early life ==
Tuxworth was born on 18 June 1942 in Wollongong, New South Wales, to Lindsay and historian Hilda Elsie Tuxworth, and moved with his family to Tennant Creek in 1951. He was educated at Tennant Creek Primary School, and Rostrevor College in Adelaide.

Before entering politics, Tuxworth, known affectionately as "Slim", started a soft drink factory in Tennant Creek, called Crystal Waters, with his father and brother Robert (Bob), which was later sold to Coca-Cola Amatil. Tuxworth also played baseball and was a member of the 1975 North Australian Kiewaldt team.

== Member of the Legislative Assembly ==
Northern Territory Legislative Assembly
Years	Term	Electoral division	Party
1974–1977	1st	Barkly	Country Liberal
1977–1980	2nd	Barkly	Country Liberal
1980–1983	3rd	Barkly	Country Liberal
1983–1986	4th	Barkly	Country Liberal
1986–1987	Changed allegiance to:		Nationals
1987–1987	5th	Barkly	Nationals
1987–1990	5th	Barkly	Nationals

Tuxworth was elected as the Country Liberal Party (CLP) member for the electoral division of Barkly (which included Tennant Creek), in the Northern Territory Legislative Assembly at its inaugural election in 1974. As the representative for Barkly, Tuxworth was instrumental in facilitating the government support for the construction of the Mary Ann Dam, north of the town of Tennant Creek.

Following the resignation of Paul Everingham, Tuxworth was elected Chief Minister on 17 October 1984. In 1985, he opposed the federal government's transfer of the ownership of Uluru to its traditional owners, the Aṉangu people and boycotted the hand-over ceremony. However, 30 years later, he acknowledged the hand-back had been a success. He resigned as Chief Minister and from the CLP on 10 May 1986 to form the NT Nationals party

At the 1987 election Tuxworth was elected as the NT Nationals member for Barkly by 19 votes. His victory was annulled by the Court of Disputed Returns after a successful challenge from losing independent candidate Maggie Hickey. On 5 September 1987, he won a by-election, again defeating Hickey, who was then representing the Labor Party (ALP). After a redistribution turned Barkly into a nominally Labor-held seat, Tuxworth stood unsuccessfully for the seat of Goyder at the 1990 election.

Tuxworth became the first CLP leader not to lead the party to an election. Until Terry Mills' ousting by his CLP party room colleagues, Tuxworth was the only Chief Minister who never faced an election.

== After politics ==
Following his defeat, Tuxworth moved to Perth, Western Australia, where he died on 21 January 2020, aged 77. He was survived by his wife Ruth, three children, and eight grandchildren.

Northern Territory Legislative Assembly
New assembly	Member for Barkly; 1974–1990	Succeeded by Maggie Hickey
Political offices
Preceded by Paul Everingham	Chief Minister of the Northern Territory; 1984–1986	Succeeded by Stephen Hatton
Party political offices
Preceded by Paul Everingham	Leader of the Country Liberal Party; 1984–1986	Succeeded by Stephen Hatton
