= Nick Dondas =

Australian politician (1939–2024)

The Honourable Nick Dondas AM
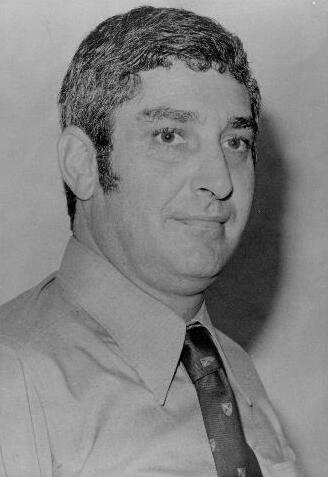
- Dondas in 1974

Member of the Australian Parliament for Northern Territory
- In office 2 March 1996 – 3 October 1998
- Preceded by: Warren Snowdon
- Succeeded by: Warren Snowdon

5th Speaker of the Northern Territory Legislative Assembly
- In office 10 October 1989 – 26 June 1994
- Preceded by: Roger Vale
- Succeeded by: Terry McCarthy

Member of the Northern Territory Legislative Assembly for Casuarina
- In office 19 October 1974 – 3 June 1994
- Preceded by: Division created
- Succeeded by: Peter Adamson

Personal details
- Born: Nicholas Manuel Dondas; 26 October 1939 Perth, Western Australia, Australia
- Died: 8 September 2024 (aged 84) Darwin, Northern Territory, Australia
- Party: Country Liberal Party; Liberal Party (federal)
- Spouse: Cheryl Jones (m. 1972)
- Children: 1

Nicholas Manuel Dondas AM (26 October 1939 – 8 September 2024) was an Australian Country Liberal politician in the Northern Territory, representing the seat of Casuarina in the Northern Territory Legislative Assembly from 1974 to 1994, and the Division of Northern Territory in the Australian House of Representatives from 1996 to 1998.

== Political career ==
As a member of the Legislative Assembly, Dondas served as a minister from 1979 to 1987 under Paul Everingham, Ian Tuxworth and Stephen Hatton. He was deputy leader of the CLP, and hence Deputy Chief Minister, from 1983 to 1987 under Everingham and Tuxworth. He was also a member of the Commonwealth Parliamentary Association as an executive from 1990 to 1992.

From October 1997 to August 1998 he served as a member of the Speaker's Panel during his time in the House of Representatives. He served in the committees on Foreign Affairs, Native Title and the Aboriginal and Torres Strait Islander Land Fund, and Aboriginal and Torres Strait Islander Affairs during his time also.

Dondas left the CLP to run unsuccessfully as an Independent for the electoral division of Port Darwin at the 2001 Northern Territory election.

== Personal life and death ==
Dondas was born in Perth, and attended Christian Brothers College, Highgate, and Perth Boys High School. He was of Greek descent. After moving to Darwin, he married Cheryl Jones, the daughter of C.F. Jones, in 1972, with whom he had one daughter. He was involved with the Northern Suburbs Community Development Association and the Darwin Regional Tourist Association before entering politics, and was also a keen rugby league player.

Dondas died in Darwin on 8 September 2024, at the age of 84.

Northern Territory Legislative Assembly
Division created	Member for Casuarina; 1974–1994	Succeeded by Peter Adamson
Preceded by Roger Vale	Speaker of the Northern Territory Legislative Assembly; 1989–1994	Succeeded by Terry McCarthy
Parliament of Australia
Preceded by Warren Snowdon	Member for Northern Territory; 1996–1998	Succeeded by Warren Snowdon
