= List of Northern Territory by-elections =

This is a list of Northern Territory by-elections, with the names of the departing and new members and their respective parties.

Gains for the Labor Party are highlighted in red, and for the Northern Territory Nationals in green.

By-election	Date	Incumbent	Party	Winner	Party	Cause
Mulka	12 September 2026	Yingiya Guyula	Independent	Yiwarr McGrath	Labor	Resignation
Nightcliff	7 March 2026	Kat McNamara	NT Greens	Ed Smelt	Labor	Resignation
Arafura	18 March 2023	Lawrence Costa	Labor	Manuel Brown	Labor	Death
Fannie Bay	20 August 2022	Michael Gunner	Labor	Brent Potter	Labor	Resignation
Daly	11 September 2021	Ian Sloan	Country Liberal	Dheran Young	Labor	Resignation (health and family reasons)
Johnston	29 February 2020	Ken Vowles	Labor	Joel Bowden	Labor	Resignation
Casuarina	18 October 2014	Kon Vatskalis	Labor	Lauren Moss	Labor	Resignation
Blain	12 April 2014	Terry Mills	Country Liberal	Nathan Barrett	Country Liberal	Resignation
Wanguri	16 February 2013	Paul Henderson	Labor	Nicole Manison	Labor	Resignation
Araluen	9 October 2010	Jodeen Carney	Country Liberal	Robyn Lambley	Country Liberal	Resignation (ill health)
Greatorex	28 July 2007	Richard Lim	Country Liberal	Matt Conlan	Country Liberal	Resignation (family reasons)
Stuart	23 September 2006	Peter Toyne	Labor	Karl Hampton	Labor	Resignation (medical reasons)
Katherine	4 October 2003	Mike Reed	Country Liberal	Fay Miller	Country Liberal	Resignation
Port Darwin	11 March 2000	Shane Stone	Country Liberal	Sue Carter	Country Liberal	Resignation
Wanguri	31 July 1999	John Bailey	Labor	Paul Henderson	Labor	Resignation
Blain	31 July 1999	Barry Coulter	Country Liberal	Terry Mills	Country Liberal	Resignation
Stuart	28 September 1996	Brian Ede	Labor	Peter Toyne	Labor	Resignation
Arnhem	7 October 1995	Wes Lanhupuy	Labor	Jack Ah Kit	Labor	Resignation
Fannie Bay	17 June 1995	Marshall Perron	Country Liberal	Clare Martin	Labor	Resignation
Arafura	7 November 1992	Stan Tipiloura	Labor	Maurice Rioli	Labor	Death
Millner	7 December 1991	Terry Smith	Labor	Ken Parish	Labor	Resignation
Wanguri	19 August 1989	Don Dale	Country Liberal	John Bailey	Labor	Resignation (ill health)
Flynn	10 September 1988	Ray Hanrahan	Country Liberal	Enzo Floreani	NT Nationals	Resignation
Barkly	5 September 1987	Ian Tuxworth	NT Nationals	Ian Tuxworth	NT Nationals	Election declared void
Araluen	19 April 1986	Jim Robertson	Country Liberal	Eric Poole	Country Liberal	Resignation
Jingili	15 December 1984	Paul Everingham	Country Liberal	Rick Setter	Country Liberal	Resignation (contested HoR)
Millner	21 November 1981	Jon Isaacs	Labor	Terry Smith	Labor	Resignation
MacDonnell	28 March 1981	Neville Perkins	Labor	Neil Bell	Labor	Resignation
Alice Springs	7 February 1976	Bernie Kilgariff	Country Liberal	Eric Manuell	Country Liberal	Resignation (contested Senate)

== See also ==
- Northern Territory Legislative Assembly
- Members of the Northern Territory Legislative Assembly
- Northern Territory ministries
