= Electoral results for the division of Arnhem =

This is a list of electoral results for the Electoral division of Arnhem in Northern Territory elections.

== Members for Arnhem ==
Member	Party	Term
Rupert Kentish	Country Liberal Party	1974–1977
Bob Collins	Labor Party	1977–1983
Wes Lanhupuy	Labor Party	1983–1995
Jack Ah Kit	Labor Party	1995–2005
Malarndirri McCarthy	Labor Party	2005–2012
Larisa Lee	Country Liberal	2012–2014
Larisa Lee	Independent	2014
Larisa Lee	Palmer United	2014
Larisa Lee	Independent	2014–2016
Selena Uibo	Labor	2016–present

== Election results ==
=== Elections in the 2020s ===
2024 Northern Territory general election: Arnhem
Party	Candidate	Votes	%	±%
Labor	Selena Uibo	2,162	64.3	+22.6
Country Liberal	Ian Mongunu Gumbula	1,202	35.7	+20.4
Total formal votes		3,364	97.3	
Informal votes		92	2.7	
Turnout		3,456	52.0	
Labor hold		Swing	−3.3	

2020 Northern Territory general election: Arnhem
Party	Candidate	Votes	%	±%
Labor	Selena Uibo	1,207	41.3	−8.6
Independent	Ian Mongunu Gumbula	987	33.8	+33.8
Country Liberal	Jerry Amato	487	16.7	−13.5
Independent	Lance Lawrence	243	8.3	−2.6
Total formal votes		2,924	92.6	N/A
Informal votes		232	7.4	N/A
Turnout		3,156	58.1	N/A
Two-party-preferred result (Note: Estimated two-party count by Antony Green.)
Labor	Selena Uibo	1,977	67.6	+7.1
Country Liberal	Jerry Amato	947	32.4	−7.1
Two-candidate-preferred result
Labor	Selena Uibo	1,504	51.4	−9.1
Independent	Ian Mongunu Gumbula	1,420	48.6	+48.6
Labor hold		Swing	−9.1	

=== Elections in the 2010s ===
2016 Northern Territory general election: Arnhem
Party	Candidate	Votes	%	±%
Labor	Selena Uibo	1,565	54.1	+9.5
Country Liberal	Ian Gumbula	804	27.8	−25.9
Independent	Lance Lawrence	211	7.3	+7.3
1 Territory	James Gaykamangu	197	6.8	+6.8
Independent	Larisa Lee	117	4.0	+4.0
Total formal votes		2,894	97.4	N/A
Informal votes		78	2.6	N/A
Turnout		2,972	57.6	N/A
Two-party-preferred result
Labor	Selena Uibo	1,777	64.3	+18.6
Country Liberal	Ian Gumbula	985	35.7	−18.6
Labor gain from Country Liberal		Swing	+18.6	

2012 Northern Territory general election: Arnhem
Party	Candidate	Votes	%	±%
Country Liberal	Larisa Lee	1,366	55.3	N/A
Labor	Malarndirri McCarthy	1,102	44.7	N/A
Total formal votes		2,468	97.0	N/A
Informal votes		76	3.0	N/A
Turnout		2,544	51.9	N/A
Country Liberal gain from Labor		Swing	N/A	

=== Elections in the 2000s ===
The 2008 election in Arnhem was uncontested with one candidate nominating.

2008 Northern Territory general election: Arnhem
Party	Candidate	Votes	%	±%
Labor	Malarndirri McCarthy	0	N/A	N/A
Total formal votes		0	N/A	N/A
Informal votes		0	N/A	N/A
Turnout		0	N/A	N/A
Labor hold		Swing	N/A	

2005 Northern Territory general election: Arnhem
Party	Candidate	Votes	%	±%
Labor	Malarndirri McCarthy	1,919	67.2	+11.3
Country Liberal	Djuwalpi Marika	652	22.8	−10.3 (Note: Swing calculated from joint performance of two Country Liberal candidates at the previous election.)
Greens	Lance Lawrence	285	10.0	+10.0
Total formal votes		2,856	93.5	N/A
Informal votes		200	6.5	N/A
Turnout		3,056	64.2	N/A
Two-party-preferred result
Labor	Malarndirri McCarthy	1,919	73.9	+18.0
Country Liberal	Djuwalpi Marika	652	26.1	−7.0
Labor hold		Swing	+18.0	

2001 Northern Territory general election: Arnhem
Party	Candidate	Votes	%	±%
Labor	Jack Ah Kit	1,372	55.9	+12.0
Country Liberal	Alan Wright	425	17.3	−2.5 (Note: Swing calculated from the combined Country Liberal result this by-election rather than the individual results of the Country Liberal candidates.)
Country Liberal	Cliff Thompson	388	15.8	−2.5 (Note: Swing calculated from the combined Country Liberal result this by-election rather than the individual results of the Country Liberal candidates.)
Independent	Lance Lawrence	270	11.0	−0.7
Total formal votes		2,455	90.0	N/A
Informal votes		274	10.0	N/A
Turnout		2,729	63.6	N/A
Two-party-preferred result
Labor	Jack Ah Kit	1,508	61.4	+3.6
Country Liberal	Alan Wright	947	38.6	−3.6
Labor hold		Swing	+3.6	

=== Elections in the 1990s ===
1997 Northern Territory general election: Arnhem
Party	Candidate	Votes	%	±%
Labor	Jack Ah Kit	1,037	43.9	−30.6
Country Liberal	Alan Wright	841	35.6	+10.1
Independent	Lance Lawrence	277	11.7	+11.7
Greens	Thomas Maywundjiwuy	208	8.8	+8.8
Total formal votes		2,363	92.0	N/A
Informal votes		207	8.0	N/A
Turnout		2,570	62.8	N/A
Two-party-preferred result
Labor	Jack Ah Kit	1,365	57.8	−16.7
Country Liberal	Alan Wright	998	42.2	+16.7
Labor hold		Swing	−16.7	

1995 Arnhem by-election
Party	Candidate	Votes	%	±%
Labor	Jack Ah Kit	1,195	51.8	−22.7
Country Liberal	Mujiji Nunggarrgulu	500	21.7	+9.6 (Note: Swing calculated from the combined Country Liberal result this by-election rather than the individual results of the Country Liberal candidates.)
Country Liberal	Terry Yumbulul	310	13.4	+9.6 (Note: Swing calculated from the combined Country Liberal result this by-election rather than the individual results of the Country Liberal candidates.)
Independent	Lance Lawrence	304	13.1	+13.1
After distribution of preferences (Note: No distribution of preferences was required, as Labor candidate Jack Ah Kit received a majority on first preferences.)
Labor	Jack Ah Kit	1,195	51.8	−22.7
Country Liberal	Mujiji Nunggarrgulu	500	21.7	+9.6 (Note: Swing calculated from the combined Country Liberal result this by-election rather than the individual results of the Country Liberal candidates.)
Country Liberal	Terry Yumbulul	310	13.4	+9.6 (Note: Swing calculated from the combined Country Liberal result this by-election rather than the individual results of the Country Liberal candidates.)
Independent	Lance Lawrence	304	13.1	+13.1
Labor hold		Swing	−22.7	

1994 Northern Territory general election: Arnhem
Party	Candidate	Votes	%	±%
Labor	Wes Lanhupuy	1,723	74.5	+18.7
Country Liberal	Veronica Januschka	590	25.5	−7.4
Total formal votes		2,313	94.4	N/A
Informal votes		136	5.6	N/A
Turnout		2,449	62.6	N/A
Labor hold		Swing	+13.3	

1990 Northern Territory general election: Arnhem
Party	Candidate	Votes	%	±%
Labor	Wes Lanhupuy	1,103	55.8	+13.9
Country Liberal	Tony Hayward-Ryan	660	33.4	+10.1
Independent	Rod Ansell	213	10.8	−10.0
Total formal votes		1,976	94.6	N/A
Informal votes		113	5.4	N/A
Turnout		2,089	66.2	N/A
Two-party-preferred result
Labor	Wes Lanhupuy	1,210	61.2	+6.1
Country Liberal	Tony Hayward-Ryan	766	38.8	−6.1
Labor hold		Swing	+6.1	

=== Elections in the 1980s ===
1987 Northern Territory general election: Arnhem
Party	Candidate	Votes	%	±%
Labor	Wes Lanhupuy	742	41.9	−2.0
Country Liberal	John Hancock	412	23.3	−7.6
Independent	Bruce Foley	368	20.8	+20.8
NT Nationals	Brian Dalliston	249	14.1	+14.1
Total formal votes		1,771	92.8	N/A
Informal votes		138	7.2	N/A
Turnout		1,909	62.2	N/A
Two-party-preferred result
Labor	Wes Lanhupuy	976	55.1	−3.5
Country Liberal	John Hancock	795	44.9	+3.5
Labor hold		Swing	−3.2	

1983 Northern Territory general election: Arnhem
Party	Candidate	Votes	%	±%
Labor	Wes Lanhupuy	632	43.9	−34.5
Country Liberal	David Amos	445	30.9	+30.9
Country Liberal	David Daniels	206	14.3	+14.3
Democrats	Klaus Rogers	157	10.9	+10.9
Total formal votes		1,440	90.5	N/A
Informal votes		152	9.5	N/A
Turnout		1,592	65.0	N/A
Two-party-preferred result
Labor	Wes Lanhupuy	840	58.3	N/A
Country Liberal	David Amos	600	41.7	N/A
Labor hold		Swing	N/A	

1980 Northern Territory general election: Arnhem
Party	Candidate	Votes	%	±%
Labor	Bob Collins	1,346	78.4	+15.0
Country Liberal	Gatjil Djerrkura	299	17.4	−11.5
Marijuana	Mark McAlear	72	4.2	+4.2
Total formal votes		1,717	93.1	N/A
Informal votes		128	6.9	N/A
Turnout		1,845	66.5	N/A
Labor hold		Swing	N/A	

- Preferences were not distributed.

=== Elections in the 1970s ===
1977 Northern Territory general election: Arnhem
Party	Candidate	Votes	%	±%
Labor	Bob Collins	812	63.4	+30.3
Country Liberal	Rupert Kentish	370	28.9	−30.0
Progress	Phillip Brain	98	7.7	+7.7
Total formal votes		1,280	94.3	N/A
Informal votes		77	5.7	N/A
Turnout		1,357	66.1	N/A
Labor gain from Country Liberal		Swing	N/A	

- Preferences were not distributed.

1974 Northern Territory general election: Arnhem
Party	Candidate	Votes	%	±%
Country Liberal	Rupert Kentish	505	66.9	N/A
Labor	Elizabeth Pearce	250	33.1	N/A
Total formal votes		755	90.1	N/A
Informal votes		83	9.9	N/A
Turnout		838	55.5	N/A
Country Liberal win		(new seat)		
