= Electoral results for the division of Wanguri =

This is a list of electoral results for the Electoral division of Wanguri in Northern Territory elections.

== Members for Wanguri ==
Member	Party	Term
Don Dale	Country Liberal	1983–1989
John Bailey	Labor	1989–1999
Paul Henderson	Labor	1999–2013
Nicole Manison	Labor	2013–present

== Election results ==
=== Elections in the 1980s ===
1983 Northern Territory general election: Wanguri
Party	Candidate	Votes	%	±%
Country Liberal	Don Dale	1,229	56.8	N/A
Labor	Pat Burke	750	34.7	N/A
Independent	Edward Miller	184	8.5	N/A
Total formal votes		2,163	98.1	N/A
Informal votes		41	1.9	N/A
Turnout		2,204	86.8	N/A
Two-party-preferred result
Country Liberal	Don Dale	1,328	61.4	N/A
Labor	Pat Burke	835	38.6	N/A
Country Liberal hold		Swing		

1987 Northern Territory general election: Wanguri
Party	Candidate	Votes	%	±%
Country Liberal	Don Dale	1,002	41.3	−15.5
Labor	Peter McNab	836	34.5	−0.2
NT Nationals	Graeme Bevis	586	24.2	+24.2
Total formal votes		2,424	96.2	N/A
Informal votes		95	3.8	N/A
Turnout		2,519	88.0	N/A
Two-party-preferred result
Country Liberal	Don Dale	1,440	59.4	−1.6
Labor	Peter McNab	984	40.6	+1.6
Country Liberal hold		Swing	−1.6	

1989 Wanguri by-election
Party	Candidate	Votes	%	±%
Labor	John Bailey	1,000	36.8	+2.3
Country Liberal	John Taylor	686	25.3	−16.0
Greens	Debra Beattie-Burnett	453	16.7	+16.7
NT Nationals	Graeme Bevis	442	16.3	−7.9
Independent	Robyne Burridge	133	4.9	+4.9
Total formal votes		2,714	96.7	+0.5
Informal votes		122	4.3	–0.5
Turnout		2,836	82.1	−5.9
Two-party-preferred result
Labor	John Bailey	1,575	58.0	+17.4
Country Liberal	John Taylor	1,139	42.0	−17.4
Labor gain from Country Liberal		Swing	17.4	

=== Elections in the 1990s ===
1990 Northern Territory general election: Wanguri
Party	Candidate	Votes	%	±%
Labor	John Bailey	1,653	56.2	+21.7
Country Liberal	John Hare	1,286	43.8	+2.5
Total formal votes		2,939	96.8	N/A
Informal votes		98	3.2	N/A
Turnout		3,037	89.0	N/A
Labor hold		Swing	+0.8	

1994 Northern Territory general election: Wanguri
Party	Candidate	Votes	%	±%
Labor	John Bailey	1,594	51.6	−4.6
Country Liberal	Steve Balch	1,496	48.4	+4.6
Total formal votes		3,090	96.6	N/A
Informal votes		109	3.4	N/A
Turnout		3,199	86.0	N/A
Labor hold		Swing	−4.6	

1997 Northern Territory general election: Wanguri
Party	Candidate	Votes	%	±%
Labor	John Bailey	1,649	52.0	+0.4
Country Liberal	Peter Styles	1,521	48.0	−0.4
Total formal votes		3,170	95.5	N/A
Informal votes		150	4.5	N/A
Turnout		3,320	85.1	N/A
Labor hold		Swing	+0.4	

1999 Wanguri by-election
Party	Candidate	Votes	%	±%
Labor	Paul Henderson	1,563	53.6	+1.6
Country Liberal	Maisie Austin	853	29.2	−18.7
Independent	Carrie Altamura	417	14.3	+14.3
Greens	Price	84	2.9	+2.9
Total formal votes		2,917	97.3	+1.8
Informal votes		81	2.7	−1.8
Turnout		2,998	78.1	−7.0
Two-party-preferred result
Labor	Paul Henderson	1,852	63.5	+11.5
Country Liberal	Maisie Austin	1,065	36.5	−11.5
Labor hold		Swing	+11.5	

=== Elections in the 2000s ===
2001 Northern Territory general election: Wanguri
Party	Candidate	Votes	%	±%
Labor	Paul Henderson	2,000	55.3	+12.4
Country Liberal	Robyn Cahill	1,498	41.4	−10.1
Socialist Alliance	Meredith De Landelles	121	3.3	+3.3
Total formal votes		3,619	97.1	N/A
Informal votes		109	2.9	N/A
Turnout		3,728	91.1	N/A
Two-party-preferred result
Labor	Paul Henderson	2,070	57.2	+11.0
Country Liberal	Robyn Cahill	1,549	42.8	−11.0
Labor notional gain from Country Liberal		Swing	+11.0	

2005 Northern Territory general election: Wanguri
Party	Candidate	Votes	%	±%
Labor	Paul Henderson	2,583	70.8	+15.5
Country Liberal	Kerrie Kyriacou	1,065	29.2	−12.2
Total formal votes		3,648	96.7	N/A
Informal votes		126	3.3	N/A
Turnout		3,774	87.7	N/A
Labor hold		Swing	+13.6	

2008 Northern Territory general election: Wanguri
Party	Candidate	Votes	%	±%
Labor	Paul Henderson	2,254	60.7	−10.0
Country Liberal	Kerry Kyriacou	1,118	30.1	+0.9
Independent	Duncan Dean	339	9.1	+9.1
Total formal votes		3,711	97.0	N/A
Informal votes		115	3.0	N/A
Turnout		3,826	83.9	N/A
Two-party-preferred result
Labor	Paul Henderson	2,407	64.9	−5.9
Country Liberal	Kerry Kyriacou	1,304	35.1	+5.9
Labor hold		Swing	−5.9	

=== Elections in the 2010s ===
2012 Northern Territory general election: Wanguri
Party	Candidate	Votes	%	±%
Labor	Paul Henderson	2,416	57.0	−3.7
Country Liberal	Rhianna Harker	1,823	43.0	+12.9
Total formal votes		4,239	98.0	+1.0
Informal votes		86	2.0	−1.0
Turnout		4,325	89.1	+5.1
Labor hold		Swing	−3.7	

2013 Wanguri by-election
Party	Candidate	Votes	%	±%
Labor	Nicole Manison	2,428	65.2	+8.2
Country Liberal	Rhianna Harker	1,059	28.4	−14.6
Independent	Peter Rudge	237	6.4	+6.4
Total formal votes		3,724	96.4	–1.7
Informal votes		141	3.6	+1.7
Turnout		3,865	77.5	−11.6
Two-party-preferred result
Labor	Nicole Manison	2,585	69.4	+12.4
Country Liberal	Rhianna Harker	1,139	30.6	−12.4
Labor hold		Swing	+12.4	

2016 Northern Territory general election: Wanguri
Party	Candidate	Votes	%	±%
Labor	Nicole Manison	2,673	58.6	+1.7
Country Liberal	Steven Doherty	1,079	23.6	−19.5
Independent	Shaun Mounsey	684	15.0	+15.0
Independent	Jan Pile	129	2.8	+2.8
Total formal votes		4,565	98.3	+0.3
Informal votes		81	1.7	−0.3
Turnout		4,646	83.4	+6.9
Two-party-preferred result
Labor	Nicole Manison	3,026	69.9	+13.1
Country Liberal	Steven Doherty	1,302	30.1	−13.1
Labor hold		Swing	+13.1	

=== Elections in the 2020s ===
2020 Northern Territory general election: Wanguri
Party	Candidate	Votes	%	±%
Labor	Nicole Manison	3,129	62.9	+4.3
Country Liberal	Jed Hansen	1,235	24.8	+1.2
Territory Alliance	Michael Best	612	12.3	+12.3
Total formal votes		4,976	97.2	N/A
Informal votes		141	2.8	N/A
Turnout		5,117	83.7	N/A
Two-party-preferred result
Labor	Nicole Manison	3,349	67.3	−2.6
Country Liberal	Jed Hansen	1,627	32.7	+2.6
Labor hold		Swing	−2.6	

2024 Northern Territory general election: Wanguri
Party	Candidate	Votes	%	±%
Country Liberal	Oly Carlson	2,069	47.7	+22.8
Labor	Shlok Sharma	1,139	26.2	−36.6
Independent	Graeme Sawyer	769	17.7	+17.7
Greens	Andrew Coates	364	8.4	+8.4
Total formal votes		4,341	96.5	−0.8
Informal votes		158	3.5	+0.8
Turnout		4,499	80.0	
Two-party-preferred result
Country Liberal	Oly Carlson	2,561	59.0	+26.3
Labor	Shlok Sharma	1,780	41.0	−26.3
Country Liberal gain from Labor		Swing	+26.3	
