= Members of the Northern Territory Legislative Assembly, 1987–1990 =

This is a list of members of the Northern Territory Legislative Assembly from 1987 to 1990.

Name	Party	Electorate	Years in office
John Bailey ^{[3]}	Labor	Wanguri	1989–1999
Neil Bell	Labor	MacDonnell	1981–1997
Denis Collins	Independent	Sadadeen	1980–1994
Hon Barry Coulter	Country Liberal	Palmerston	1983–1999
Hon Don Dale ^{[3]}	Country Liberal	Wanguri	1983–1989
Hon Nick Dondas	Country Liberal	Casuarina	1974–1994
Brian Ede	Labor	Stuart	1983–1996
Hon Fred Finch	Country Liberal	Leanyer	1983–1997
Col Firmin	Country Liberal ^{[4]}	Ludmilla	1983–1990
Col Firmin	Independent	Ludmilla	1983–1990
Enzo Floreani ^{[2]}	Nationals	Flynn	1988–1990
Hon Ray Hanrahan ^{[2]}	Country Liberal	Flynn	1983–1988
Hon Tom Harris	Country Liberal	Port Darwin	1977–1990
Hon Stephen Hatton	Country Liberal	Nightcliff	1983–2001
Wes Lanhupuy	Labor	Arnhem	1983–1995
Dan Leo	Labor	Nhulunbuy	1980–1990
Hon Daryl Manzie	Country Liberal	Sanderson	1983–2001
Hon Terry McCarthy	Country Liberal	Victoria River	1983–2001
Noel Padgham-Purich	Independent	Koolpinyah	1977–1997
Mick Palmer	Country Liberal	Karama	1983–2001
Hon Marshall Perron	Country Liberal	Fannie Bay	1974–1995
Hon Eric Poole	Country Liberal	Araluen	1986–2001
Mike Reed	Country Liberal	Katherine	1987–2003
Rick Setter	Country Liberal	Jingili	1984–1997
Terry Smith	Labor	Millner	1981–1991
Stan Tipiloura	Labor	Arafura	1987–1992
Ian Tuxworth ^{[1]}	Nationals	Barkly	1974–1990
Hon Roger Vale	Country Liberal	Braitling	1974–1994

^{1} Ian Tuxworth was elected as an NT Nationals member by a margin of 19 votes at the March election, but had his victory annulled by the Court of Disputed Returns after a successful challenge from losing independent candidate Maggie Hickey. On 5 September, he won a by-election, again defeating Hickey, who was now representing the ALP.
^{2} CLP member Ray Hanrahan resigned on 15 August 1988; NT Nationals candidate Enzo Floreani won the resulting by-election on 10 September.
^{3} CLP member Don Dale resigned on 27 July 1989; Labor candidate John Bailey won the resulting by-election on 19 August.
^{4} CLP member Col Firmin lost preselection prior to the 1990 election and became an independent.

== See also ==
- 1987 Northern Territory general election
