= 2014 Blain by-election =

- 12 April 2014
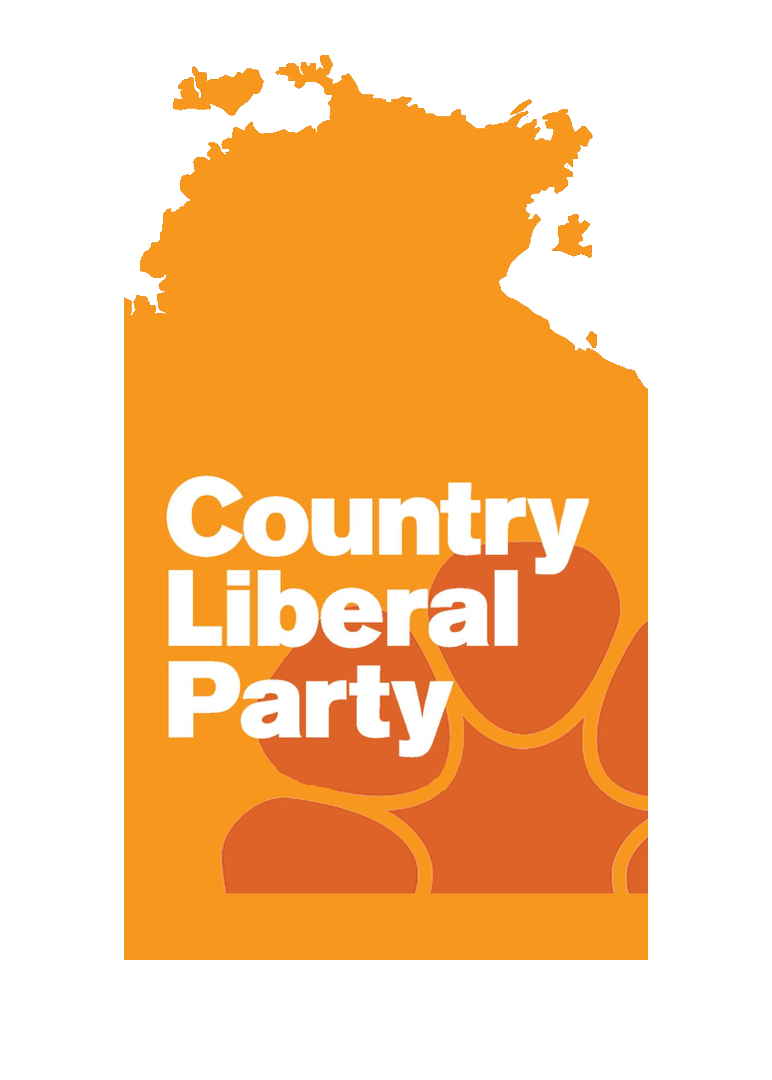

	First party	Second party
Candidate	Nathan Barrett	Geoff Bahnert
Party	Country Liberal	Labor
Popular vote	1,768	1,448
Percentage	45.5%	37.3%
Swing	▼16.0pp	▲3.7pp
TPP	53.2%	46.8%
TPP swing	▼10.0pp	▲10.0pp
MP before election
Terry Mills
Country Liberal
Elected MP
Nathan Barrett
Country Liberal

A by-election for the seat of Blain in the Northern Territory Legislative Assembly was held on 12 April 2014. The by-election was triggered by the resignation of Country Liberal Party (CLP) member and former Northern Territory Chief Minister Terry Mills. Mills resigned in reaction to being removed as CLP leader and Chief Minister in March 2013 in a party room coup by Adam Giles. The CLP margin in the Palmerston-based seat was 13.2 points.

On 3 April 2014, a week after the writ was issued for the by-election, three indigenous CLP MPs resigned from the party and moved to the crossbench. Had the CLP failed to hold Blain, it would have been reduced to a minority government and would have needed the support of at least one of the four independents to stay in office. Although Blain was a comfortably safe CLP seat on paper, the average swing against governments at by-elections in greater Darwin/Palmerston was 12 per cent.

== Candidates ==
The five candidates in ballot paper order were:

Candidate nominations
Party	Candidate	Background
Citizens Electoral Council	Peter Flynn	Navy officer, Earth moving contractor. Contested Lingiari at the 2010 and 2013 federal elections.
Labor Party	Geoff Bahnert	Professional sportsman, business operator, Police Senior Sergeant. Contested Blain at the 2012 election.
Country Liberal Party	Nathan Barrett	Teacher, business operator, port worker.
Independent	Matthew Cranitch	Northern Territory Australian Education Union President.
NT Greens	Sue McKinnon	City of Palmerston Councillor. Contested Blain at the 2005 election.

== Results ==
Blain by-election, 2014
Party	Candidate	Votes	%	±%
Country Liberal	Nathan Barrett	1,768	45.5	−16.0
Labor	Geoff Bahnert	1,448	37.3	+3.7
Independent	Matthew Cranitch	336	8.7	+8.7
Greens	Sue McKinnon	275	7.1	+7.1
Citizens Electoral Council	Peter Flynn	56	1.4	+1.4
Total formal votes		3,883	95.5	−1.1
Informal votes		184	4.5	+1.1
Turnout		4,067	68.8	−14.4
Two-party-preferred result
Country Liberal	Nathan Barrett	2,067	53.2	−10.0
Labor	Geoff Bahnert	1,816	46.8	+10.0
Country Liberal hold		Swing	−10.0	

A recheck of all election night counts was conducted on Sunday 13 April, and early distribution of preferences was carried out on Tuesday 15 April. Final vote figures were published by NTEC on the evening of 22 April—the deadline for arrival of postal votes.

The CLP claimed victory on election night, with the night's count indicating they had retained the seat by a 3.2 per cent margin on a two-party-preferred basis, with a 10 per cent swing against them. The official declaration of the poll took place on the morning of Wednesday 16 April 2014. Despite coming close to winning the seat, Bahnert was not again the ALP candidate for Blain at the 2016 election.

== Opinion polling ==
Date	Firm	Sample size	Primary vote				2PP vote	
Date	Firm	Sample size	CLP	ALP	IND	OTH	CLP	ALP
12 Apr 2014	2014 by-election		45.5%	37.3%	8.7%	8.5%	53.2%	46.8%
11 Apr 2014	NT News	200	40.8%	39.2%	12.5%	7.5%	51%	49%
7 Apr 2014	Matthew Cranitch	150	31%	35%	23%	10%	—N/a	—N/a
25 Aug 2012	2012 election		61.6%	33.6%	—	4.9%	63.2%	36.8%

== See also ==
- List of Northern Territory by-elections
