= Malarndirri McCarthy =

Indigenous Australian politician and journalist

Senator The Honourable Malarndirri McCarthy
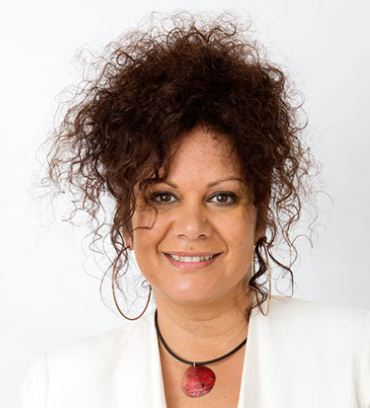
- McCarthy in 2022

Minister for Indigenous Australians
- Incumbent
- Assumed office 29 July 2024
- Prime Minister: Anthony Albanese
- Preceded by: Linda Burney

Assistant Minister for Indigenous Australians
- In office 1 June 2022 – 28 July 2024
- Prime Minister: Anthony Albanese
- Preceded by: Chris Gallus (2004)
- Succeeded by: Position abolished

Assistant Minister for Indigenous Health
- In office 1 June 2022 – 28 July 2024
- Prime Minister: Anthony Albanese
- Preceded by: Position established
- Succeeded by: Ged Kearney

Minister Assisting the Chief Minister on Multicultural Affairs
- In office 18 August 2008 – 8 February 2009
- Preceded by: Kon Vatskalis
- Succeeded by: Terry Mills

Minister for Children and Families
- In office 18 August 2008 – 3 December 2009
- Preceded by: Marion Scrymgour
- Succeeded by: Kon Vatskalis

Minister for Child Protection
- In office 18 August 2008 – 3 December 2009
- Preceded by: Marion Scrymgour
- Succeeded by: Kon Vatskalis

Minister for Statehood
- In office 18 August 2008 – 28 August 2012
- Preceded by: Position established
- Succeeded by: Terry Mills

Minister for Senior Territorians and Young Territorians
- In office 18 August 2008 – 5 August 2009
- Preceded by: Matthew Bonson
- Succeeded by: Gerry McCarthy

Minister for Women's Policy
- In office 18 August 2008 – 5 August 2009
- Preceded by: Clare Martin
- Succeeded by: Robyn Lambley

Minister Assisting the Chief Minister on Education
- In office 9 February 2009 – 5 August 2009
- Preceded by: Syd Stirling
- Succeeded by: Robyn Lambley

Minister for Indigenous Policy
- In office 6 August 2009 – 3 December 2009
- Preceded by: Syd Stirling
- Succeeded by: Alison Anderson

Minister for Local Government
- In office 4 December 2009 – 28 August 2012
- Preceded by: Kon Vatskalis
- Succeeded by: Adam Giles

Minister for Regional Development
- In office 4 December 2009 – 28 August 2012
- Preceded by: Kon Vatskalis
- Succeeded by: Alison Anderson

Minister for Indigenous Development
- In office 4 December 2009 – 28 August 2012
- Preceded by: Clare Martin
- Succeeded by: Alison Anderson

Minister for Tourism
- In office 4 December 2009 – 28 August 2012
- Preceded by: Chris Burns
- Succeeded by: Terry Mills

Senator for the Northern Territory
- Incumbent
- Assumed office 2 July 2016
- Preceded by: Nova Peris

Member of the Northern Territory Legislative Assembly for Arnhem
- In office 18 June 2005 – 24 August 2012
- Preceded by: Jack Ah Kit
- Succeeded by: Larisa Lee

Personal details
- Born: Barbara Anne McCarthy; 1970 (age 55–56) Katherine, Northern Territory, Australia
- Party: Labor
- Education: St Scholastica's College
- Occupation: Politician
- Website: malarndirrimccarthy.com.au

Malarndirri Barbara Anne McCarthy (born 1970) is an Indigenous Australian politician and former journalist who has been a Senator for the Northern Territory since 2016. She is the Minister for Indigenous Australians in the Albanese Government since 29 July 2024. She previously served in the Northern Territory Legislative Assembly.

After working for the Australian Broadcasting Corporation as a reporter and newsreader for 16 years, in 2005, McCarthy was elected to the NT Legislative Assembly for the division of Arnhem. She was re-elected unopposed in 2008, and was subsequently appointed to the ministry by Paul Henderson. She held a number of portfolios over the following four years, but lost her seat in Labor's landslide defeat at the 2012 election. McCarthy subsequently returned to the media as a presenter for NITV and SBS News. She re-entered politics as Labor's lead Senate candidate in the Northern Territory at the 2016 federal election. She was appointed Minister for Indigenous Australians in July 2024 after Linda Burney announced her retirement from parliament.

== Early life and education ==
Barbara Anne McCarthy was born in 1970 in Katherine, Northern Territory, the daughter of Limandabina Charlie and John McCarthy. She embraces her Aboriginal identity, being descended through her mother from the Garrwa and Yanyuwa peoples, whose traditional lands straddle the McArthur River and the Gulf of Carpentaria. Her father, originally from Sydney, is descended from an Irishman who arrived in Australia in 1842. Being of Catholic faith, his daughter was baptised in the Catholic church. She grew up "with a deep respect both traditional Indigenous and Catholic values". McCarthy was raised mainly by her father, but was always encouraged to stay connected to her Aboriginal culture; she later said she was brought up on two-way learning, although it was not so named at the time.

McCarthy attended school first in Borroloola, on the McArthur River, and then at a Catholic primary school in Alice Springs. Following this she spent six years of boarding school at St Scholastica's College, Sydney, where she was school captain in 1988.

== Career ==
=== Early career in journalism ===
After her Year 12 English teacher suggested that she apply for a cadetship at the Australian Broadcasting Corporation, McCarthy began her cadetship as a journalist for ABC Darwin in 1989. She worked across Australia as a news and current affairs television and radio reporter. In 1993, after a trial run at presenting the late news from Sydney, she was appointed as weeknight newsreader for ABC News in Darwin. She also presented the current affairs programme Stateline.

Returning to Borroloola in 1997, she co-established its first community radio station, B102.9FM – The Voice of the Gulf, in 1998, with assistance from the ABC, and also set up the Lijakarda Cultural Festivals & Media, Arts & Training Centre for Yanyuwa, Kudanji, Garrawa and Mara people from Borroloola.

She spent 16 years working for the ABC, first as a reporter behind the camera, and then as newsreader. She then set up her own media consultancy, called Malarndirri Media.

=== Early political career in the NT ===
In 2005, McCarthy was preselected as the Labor candidate in Arnhem to replace the retiring member Jack Ah Kit. She received 73.9% of the two-party preferred vote, a 12.5% increase on Ah Kit's result. As a result of her election, McCarthy became one of ten women in the 25-seat assembly, considered at the time to be in the top 10 in the world in male-to-female ratio in a parliament.

Northern Territory Legislative Assembly
Years	Term	Electoral division	Party
2005–2008	10th	Arnhem	Labor
2008–2012	11th	Arnhem	Labor

McCarthy was one of five Indigenous candidates elected, properly reflecting the population ratio of Indigenous people in the Territory. Her first term was highlighted by crossing the floor with two other ALP members to vote against the government's decision to divert the McArthur River to allow more mining developments on spiritual, cultural, and environmental grounds in her Country, of Borroloola.

In August 2007, on the sudden death of her mother, who had been a strong advocate for the Borroloola people's struggle for land rights, linguistic, and cultural parity, and who despaired at the river diversion, McCarthy added her Yanyuwa name of Malarndirri, out of cultural respect for her mother.

She was re-elected unopposed in the 2008 election. Immediately following her re-election, McCarthy was promoted to the ministry and, from August 2008 to November 2009, was the Minister for Children and Families, Child Protection, Statehood, Women's Policy, Senior Territorians, Young Territorians, and the Minister Assisting the Chief Minister on Multicultural Affairs. She called for a public inquiry into the NT's child protection system, and drove reform in this area as well as the homelands policy.

In December 2009, a Cabinet reshuffle took place as a result of a Labor Cabinet Minister leaving the NT Labor government and was not replaced in the Cabinet. McCarthy's portfolios then doubled, and she was tasked to implement major reforms in the areas of Local Government, Regional Economic Development and Indigenous Development, while keeping the Women's and statehood portfolio, Tourism was also added to her brief. At the 2012 election, McCarthy was defeated by Country Liberal Party challenger Larisa Lee amid Labor's collapse in the remote portions of the Territory.

=== Back to journalism ===
McCarthy then returned to journalism, working for National Indigenous Television (NITV) and SBS until 2016.

She won the 2013 Journalism Story of the Year Deadly Award for her story on two Perth Noongar brothers, the Thorne Brothers, who were in Saudi Arabia. Shayden Thorne had been arrested on terrorism charges in Riyadh, while his brother Junaid was in hiding after protesting his brother's innocence. Both Shayden and Junaid returned to their families in Perth.

In 2013, McCarthy wrote a story on Mercedes-Benz, which filmed its advertisement at Wave Rock in Western Australia, a place of deep cultural significance to Aboriginal custodians. The general manager of Mercedes-Benz flew to Wave Rock to personally apologise to the traditional custodians.

McCarthy was a journalist and presenter at NITV and SBS News. She headed a team of journalists as executive producer of NITV National News, until the program was cut in 2015. She was presenting NITV News Week in Review later that year.

=== Federal politics ===
Following the resignation of Nova Peris, McCarthy was invited by Labor to nominate as a candidate for the Senate at the 2016 federal election, representing the Northern Territory, including Christmas and Cocos (Keeling) Islands. She was subsequently endorsed as the Labor candidate despite not being enrolled to vote in the Northern Territory. McCarthy went on to win a Senate seat at the 2 July 2016 federal election, bringing a much higher primary vote and a swing of nearly 7 points to the Australian Labor Party.

McCarthy was the first federal politician to list ownership of traditional Indigenous lands as part of her declaration of interests. She was Temporary Chair of Committees from October 2017 until July 2019, when she was appointed as Opposition Deputy Whip in the Senate.

Before the 2017 same-sex marriage, she advocated strongly for a change in the laws. She has been vocal on issues such as domestic violence and alcohol abuse in the NT, and has fought for better representation in the Senate for all territories. She has opposed the permanent introduction of the cashless debit card to the NT, and believes that the territory needs a remote program that creates jobs with proper wages and conditions.

Following the 2022 federal election in July 2022 McCarthy was appointed the Assistant Minister for Indigenous Australians and the Assistant Minister for Indigenous Health. She was unable to attend the first swearing-in ceremony of the Albanese ministry owing to having COVID-19, but was sworn in separately on 16 June 2022. She has maintained a focus on Indigenous health, including the high incidence of kidney disease among Aboriginal Australians, especially in the NT.

In the lead-up to the 2023 Indigenous Voice to Paraliament referendum, McCarthy was a staunch supporter of the Yes vote.

McCarthy has been very active in parliamentary committees, including:

- Joint Select: Constitutional Recognition Relating to Aboriginal and Torres Strait Islander Peoples
- Joint Standing: National Disability Insurance Scheme, National Capital and External Territories, Foreign Affairs, Defence and Trade
- Joint Statutory: Law Enforcement
- Senate Legislative and General Purpose Standing: Finance and Public Administration, Rural and Regional Affairs and Transport (Legislation), Rural and Regional Affairs and Transport (References), Community Affairs (Legislation), Community Affairs (References), Rural and Regional Affairs and Transport (Legislation), Rural and Regional Affairs and Transport (References), Environment and Communications (References)
- Senate Select: Stillbirth Research and Education, Chair of the Stillbirth Research and Education, Effectiveness of the Australian Government's Northern Australia Agenda, Chair of the Aboriginal Flag

==== Minister for Indigenous Australians ====
In the July 2024 reshuffle, she was appointed Minister for Indigenous Australians and elevated to cabinet. This is the first time that both the positions of minister and shadow minister for Indigenous Australians, which is held by Jacinta Nampijinpa Price, are both held by Aboriginal women from the Northern Territory.

Shortly after her appointment, the latest Closing the Gap report was published, showing that only five of the 19 Closing the Gap targets were on track, and several had slipped further. She said that she would be focused on these targets, and hoped to work on Indigenous affairs in a bipartisan manner.

She attended the Garma Festival in Arnhem Land with Prime Minister Anthony Albanese within a week of being sworn in as minister, and while there also gave her first television interview since her appointment.

== Other activities ==
During her time working as a journalist for SBS and NITV, McCarthy also worked part-time at her sons' school Saint Ignatius' College at Riverview, New South Wales, assisting in developing the First Nations Unit program and teaching a cross-cultural program at the Catholic school, including teaching year 7 students about Indigenous landcare. She would also take boys to stay in the NT, which she described as a "deeply spiritual experience for [her]".

In 2017, she gave a speech at the National Indigenous Human Rights Awards at Parliament House, in which, citing the example of trailblazing land rights campaigner Eddie Koiki Mabo, said "Believing in the impossible is really what leads us to where we get to in life".

In 2018, McCarthy was invited to give the Kerferd Oration, which is held in Beechworth, Victoria each year since 2003.

She gave the Venerable Mary Aikenhead Oration 2024 (named after Mary Aikenhead, founder of Sisters of Charity of Australia) at the Australian Catholic University in Sydney on 25 July 2025. Her topic was "Improving health and education outcomes for Indigenous Australians".

She has participated in the Community Development Fund run by the Arts Council, and was a patron for SIDS & Kids NT for 12 years. She has also been a member of Emily's List and Women's Network NT.

=== Media appearances ===
McCarthy has been a guest on ABC Television's Q+A panel show several times.

== Recognition and awards ==
A photographic portrait of McCarthy by British photojournalist Penny Tweedie hangs in the National Portrait Gallery of Australia.

Awards and nominations during her career as a journalist include:

- 2013: Winner, inaugural journalism award for Story of the Year at the Deadly Awards
- 2013: Nomination, Walkley Award, for her story on Mercedes-Benz
- 2014: Nomination, Walkley Award, as a member of the NITV team, for the Innocence Betrayed documentary based on the Bowraville murders investigation
- 2014: Journalist of the Year, NSW Multicultural and Indigenous Media Awards
- 2015: Nomination, Logie Awards, for her coverage of a NSW Police raid on a family in Moree to remove eight children

== Personal life ==
McCarthy raised three sons as a single mother. (Note: She has also been cited as having two adult sons:) One of them CJ, has lived with a physical disability since birth, and works with young people. He won a scholarship to play wheelchair basketball for the University of Texas.

After announcing her engagement in January 2021, McCarthy married Richard Bryant on 2 July 2022 in Darwin. Senator Don Farrell attended the wedding.

She has also spoken of her kinship responsibilities towards four young women: the two daughters of her "cousin–sister", and twin daughters of her "cousin-brother". She and her husband also act as parents to these children.

In the remote area in Northern Territory where she grew up, she is known simply as "Mal" or "Barb" or "yapa".

McCarthy was diagnosed in 2015 as suffering from polycystic kidney disease, which she inherited from her mother. An acute kidney infection saw her having to be rushed out of Parliament to a hospital in 2019.

== Footnotes ==
Northern Territory Legislative Assembly
Preceded by Jack Ah Kit	Member for Arnhem; 2005–2012	Succeeded by Larisa Lee
Parliament of Australia
Preceded by Nova Peris	Senator for the Northern Territory; 2016–present	Incumbent
Political offices
Preceded by Linda Burney	Minister for Indigenous Australians; 2024–present	Incumbent
