= 2013 Country Liberal Party leadership spill =

- 13 March 2013
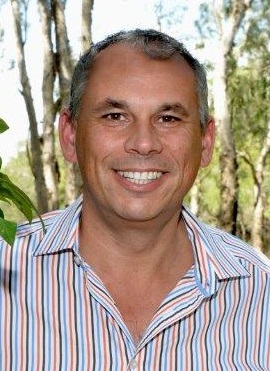

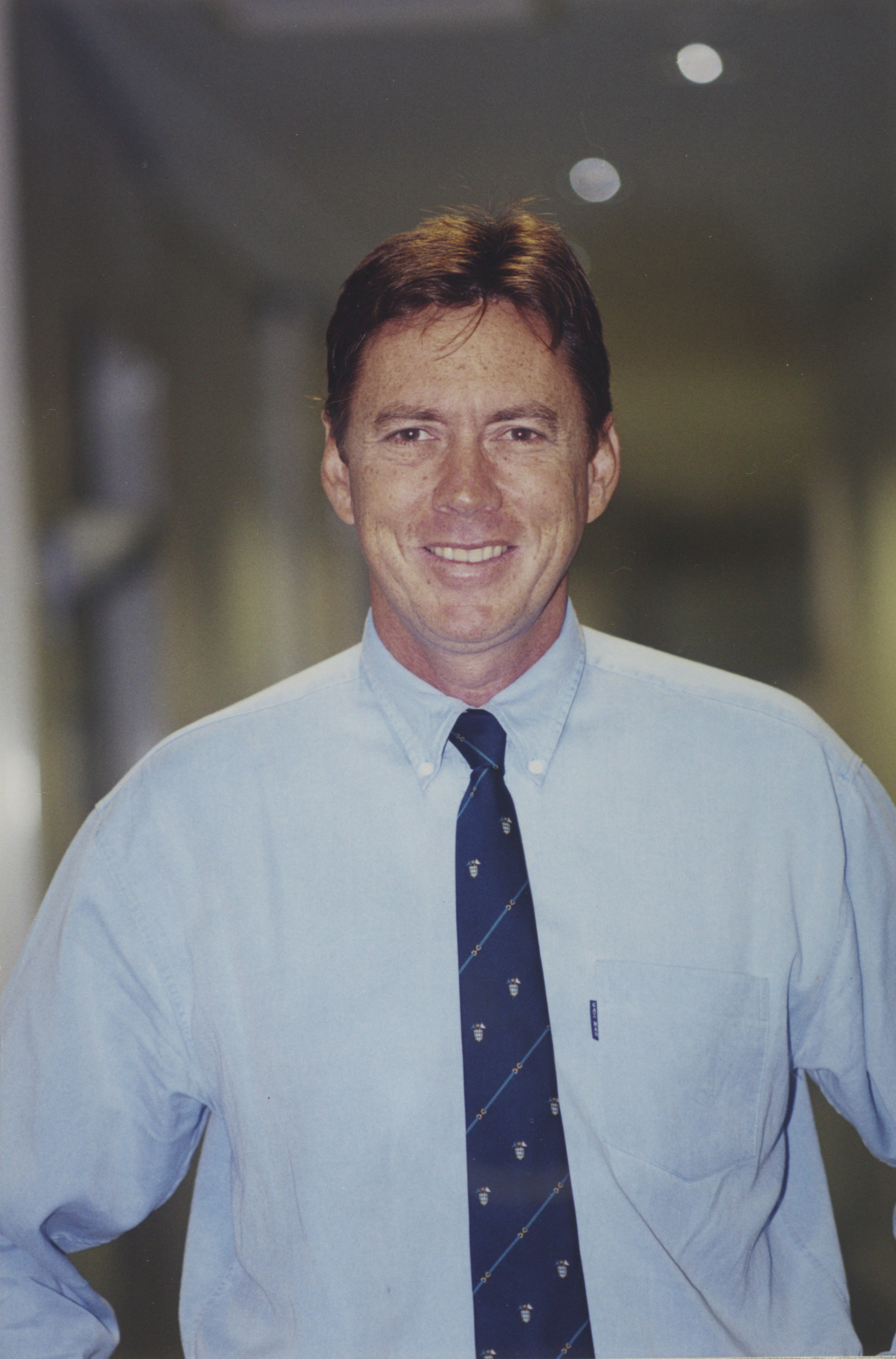
Candidate	Adam Giles	Terry Mills
Caucus vote	11	5
Percentage	68.75%	31.25%
Seat	Braitling	Blain
Leader before election
Terry Mills
Elected Leader
Adam Giles

A leadership spill of the Country Liberal Party (CLP) in the Northern Territory of Australia occurred on 13 March 2013, less than a year after the Terry Mills-led CLP opposition defeated the Paul Henderson-led Labor government at the 2012 election, winning 16 of 25 seats.

Transport Minister Adam Giles officially replaced Mills as Chief Minister of the Northern Territory and leader of the CLP on 14 March 2013 with 11 votes to 5. The events occurred while Mills was on a trade mission in Japan. Giles became the first indigenous head of government of an Australian state or territory.

Despite Mills being informed of his ousting whilst in Japan, Giles denied that it was a coup.

Resulting from the 2015 CLP leadership ballot on 2 February, the possibility of a confidence motion being put to the assembly was raised by Willem Westra van Holthe to take over the leadership from Giles, however Giles managed to retain the leadership and continued to govern.

Multiple defections saw the CLP reduced to minority government a few months later.

The 2016 election was held on 27 August.

== See also ==
- Country Liberal Party leadership spill, 2015
- 2016 Northern Territory general election § Opinion polling
