= 1999 Wanguri by-election =

31 July 1999
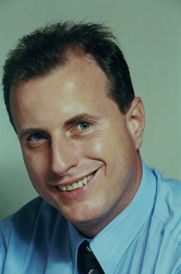

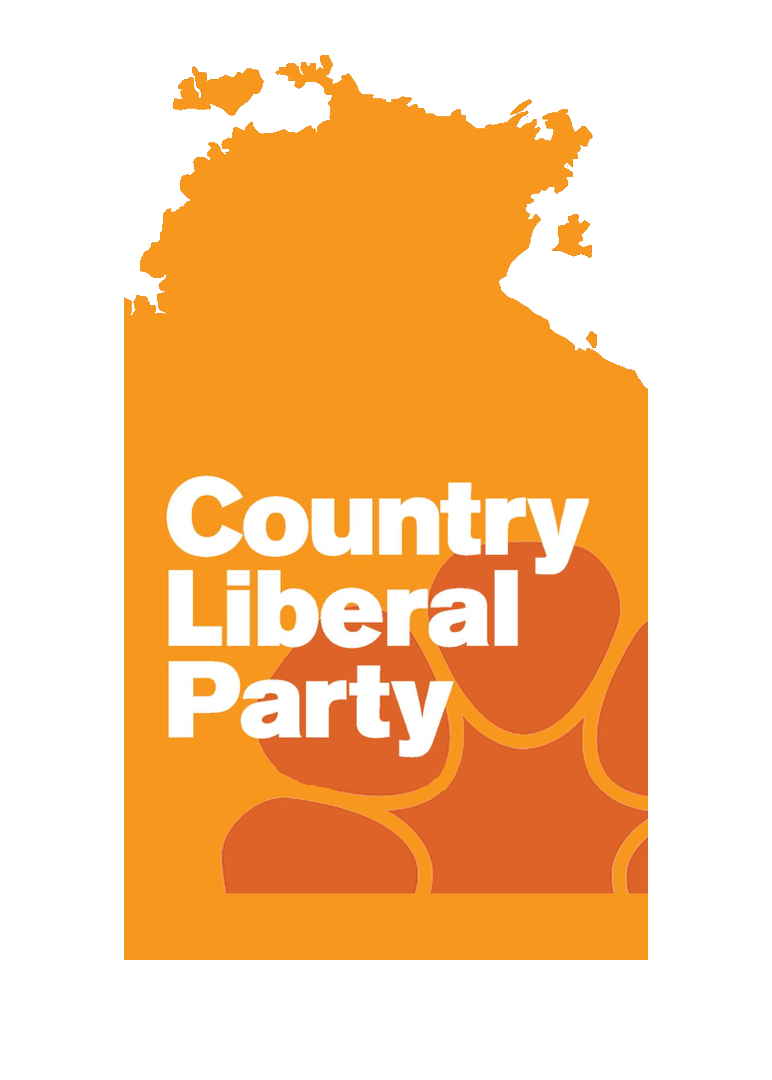
	First party	Second party	Third party
			IND
Candidate	Paul Henderson	Maisie Austin	Carrie Altamurra
Party	Labor	Country Liberal	Independent
Popular vote	1,563	853	417
Percentage	53.6%	29.2%	14.3%
Swing	▲1.6pp	▼18.7pp	▲14.3pp
TPP	63.5%	36.5%
TPP swing	▲11.5pp	▼11.5pp
MP before election
John Bailey
Labor
Elected MP
Paul Henderson
Labor

A by-election for the seat of Wanguri in the Northern Territory Legislative Assembly was held on 31 July 1999. The by-election was triggered by the resignation of Labor (ALP) member John Bailey. The seat had been held by Bailey since winning a previous by-election in 1989.

The ALP selected Paul Henderson, a computer analyst, as its candidate. The CLP candidate was Maisie Austin.

== Results ==
Wanguri by-election, 1999
Party	Candidate	Votes	%	±%
Labor	Paul Henderson	1,563	53.6	+1.6
Country Liberal	Maisie Austin	853	29.2	−18.7
Independent	Carrie Altamura	417	14.3	+14.3
Greens	Price	84	2.9	+2.9
Total formal votes		2,917	97.3	+1.8
Informal votes		81	2.7	−1.8
Turnout		2,998	78.1	−7.0
Two-party-preferred result
Labor	Paul Henderson	1,852	63.5	+11.5
Country Liberal	Maisie Austin	1,065	36.5	−11.5
Labor hold		Swing	+11.5	
