= Adam Giles =

Australian politician (born 1973)

The Honourable Adam Giles
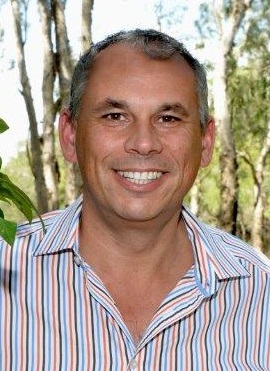
- Giles in 2015

10th Chief Minister of the Northern Territory
- In office 14 March 2013 – 31 August 2016
- Deputy: Dave Tollner; Peter Chandler; Willem Westra van Holthe; Peter Styles
- Administrator: Sally Thomas; John Hardy
- Preceded by: Terry Mills
- Succeeded by: Michael Gunner

Leader of the Country Liberal Party
- In office 14 March 2013 – 2 September 2016
- Deputy: Dave Tollner (2013–14); Peter Chandler (2014–15); Willem Westra van Holthe (2015–2016); Peter Styles (2016)
- Preceded by: Terry Mills
- Succeeded by: Gary Higgins

Member of the Northern Territory Parliament for Braitling
- In office 9 August 2008 – 27 August 2016
- Preceded by: Loraine Braham
- Succeeded by: Dale Wakefield

Personal details
- Born: Adam Graham Romer; 10 April 1973 (age 53) Springwood, New South Wales, Australia
- Party: One Nation (since 2026)
- Other political affiliations: Country Liberal Party (until 2026)
- Cabinet: Giles Ministry

Adam Graham Giles (né Romer; born 10 April 1973) is an Australian former politician and former Chief Minister of the Northern Territory (2013–2016) as well as the former leader of the Country Liberal Party (CLP) in the unicameral Northern Territory Parliament. Giles is the first Indigenous Australian to serve as a head of government in Australia.

Giles became a CLP member of the Northern Territory Legislative Assembly seat of Braitling at the 2008 election. The Terry Mills-led CLP opposition defeated the Paul Henderson-led Labor government at the 2012 election, winning 16 of 25 seats. Giles was elected by the CLP party room to replace Mills as Chief Minister and CLP leader less than a year later at the 2013 CLP leadership ballot. Giles was defeated at the 2015 CLP leadership ballot but managed to survive in the aftermath. Multiple defections saw the CLP reduced to minority government a few months later. At the 2016 election on 27 August, his government was heavily defeated by the Labor Party, suffering the worst defeat of a sitting government in Territory history. Giles also lost his seat of Braitling to Labor, becoming the second sitting head of government in the Northern Territory to lose his own seat.

After leaving politics, Giles has hosted a Sunday night current affairs program, The Adam Giles Show, on Sky News Australia since May 2018. He was the most recent Chief Minister from the Country Liberal Party until the 2024 election.

In 2017, Giles was employed with Gina Rinehart.

== Early life and public service career ==
Giles was born Adam Graham Romer in Springwood in the Blue Mountains, west of Sydney. His mother is Anglo-Saxon and his father was descended from the Kamilaroi people through Giles's grandmother. His grandmother discovered that she had indigenous ancestry during the 1980s, but has said she did not regard herself as Aboriginal. When his parents split up, Adam's mother remarried, and he took his surname from his stepfather.

Giles studied accounting and real estate after leaving Blaxland High School, working in property management before moving into public housing management for the Aboriginal and Torres Strait Islander Commission (ATSIC). He then moved to Canberra to work in the Australian Public Service as a social and economic policy advisor for the Department of the Prime Minister and Cabinet and Department of Employment and Workplace Relations (2001–2007), and was the Liberal Party candidate for Fraser in the 2004 federal election.

== Parliament ==
Northern Territory Legislative Assembly
Years	Term	Electoral division	Party
2008–2012	11th	Braitling	Country Liberal
2012–2016	12th	Braitling	Country Liberal

As a member of the Northern Territory's Indigenous Economic Taskforce, Giles travelled and worked throughout the Territory before settling in Alice Springs. There he stood as a CLP candidate for Lingiari at the 2007 federal election, losing to Labor incumbent Warren Snowdon.

Following the retirement of Loraine Braham, the CLP-turned-independent member for the Alice Springs-based seat of Braitling, Giles was preselected as CLP candidate for the 2008 Northern Territory election. He won with 2,052 primary votes, or with 70% (2,475 votes) after preferences were distributed—thus reverting Braitling to its traditional status as a comfortably safe CLP seat.

Following the 2012 Northern Territory election, Giles became the Minister for Transport, Infrastructure and Local Government.

== Chief Minister ==
=== 2013 CLP leadership ballot ===
Giles replaced Terry Mills as Chief Minister of the Northern Territory and party leader at the 2013 CLP leadership ballot on 13 March while Mills was on a trade mission in Japan. Giles was sworn in as Chief Minister on 14 March, becoming the first indigenous head of government of an Australian state or territory.

When the CLP introduced mandatory alcohol rehabilitation for recidivist problem drinkers to replace a banned drinker register, Giles dismissed critics of the policy as "lefty welfare-orientated people".

=== 2015 CLP leadership ballot ===
Willem Westra van Holthe challenged Giles at the 2015 CLP leadership ballot on 2 February and was elected leader by the party room in a late-night vote conducted by phone. However, Giles refused to resign as Chief Minister following the vote. On 3 February, ABC News reported that officials were preparing an instrument that would allow the Administrator to use his reserve power to sack Giles and commission Westra van Holthe in his place. The swearing-in of Westra van Holthe, which had been scheduled for 11:00 local time (01:30 UTC), was delayed. After a meeting of the parliamentary wing of the CLP, Giles announced that he would remain as party leader and Chief Minister, with Westra van Holthe as his deputy.

=== Defections and minority government ===
After four defections during the parliamentary term including Kezia Purick, Alison Anderson, Larisa Lee and Robyn Lambley, the CLP was reduced to minority government by July 2015. Giles raised the possibility of an early election on 20 July stating that he would "love" to call a snap poll, but that it was "pretty much impossible to do". Crossbenchers dismissed the notion of voting against a confidence motion to bring down the government.

=== Port of Darwin ===
In October 2015, the then Country Liberal-controlled Northern Territory Government under Giles granted the Chinese-owned Landbridge Group company a 99-year lease for A$506 million of Port Darwin. Concerns have been expressed over this leasing arrangement due its strategic significance, Landbridge being owned by a billionaire with close ties to the Chinese Communist Party, and the port being adjacent to facilities in active use by both Australian and U.S. military forces.

In 2025, Giles defended his government’s 2015 decision to lease, and said if he had the chance, he would do it again. Giles also opposed any moves for the Australian government to take back the port.

=== 2016 election and electoral changes ===
Legislation passed in February 2016 changed the voting method of single-member electorates from full-preferential voting to optional preferential voting. The 2016 election was held on 27 August.

The CLP went into the election as a decided underdog. Polls showed the CLP in danger of losing seats where it had never been seriously threatened. For instance, a poll conducted by ReachTEL and commissioned by The Australian which surveyed 1036 residents via robocall on the afternoon of Sunday 1 March 2015 across all 18 electorates in Darwin, Palmerston and Alice Springs–almost three-fourths of the legislature–indicated a landslide 17.6% two-party swing against the incumbent CLP government since the last election. Another poll conducted for Northern Territory News a week before the writs were issued showed the CLP on 36 percent of the two-party vote—a swing of over 20 percent from 2012. The CLP would have been decimated with a swing even half that large. The poll showed the CLP trailing badly in the politically critical Darwin/Palmerston area, which accounts for more than half the seats in the legislature. Most seriously, the CLP had plunged to only 37 percent support in Palmerston, which has been a CLP stronghold for four decades. Had this result been repeated at an election, the CLP would have lost most, if not all, of its seats in Darwin/Palmerston.

A further warning sign came at the 2 July federal election, in which the CLP suffered a 7.4 percent swing to Labor—more than enough for a change of government had this been repeated at a Territory election. Ominously, it lost Solomon, which is virtually coextensive with the Darwin/Palmerston metropolitan area, on a swing of over seven percent.

At the 27 August election, the CLP was thrown from office in a massive swing, suffering the worst defeat of a sitting government in the Territory's history. It is also the first time that a Territory government has failed to win a second term. Giles conceded defeat three hours after counting began, saying, "Tonight, no doubt, is a landslide, it's a thumping."

By Sunday morning, all but one member of Giles's cabinet, Gary Higgins, had been defeated, and Giles was in danger of being rolled in his own seat as well. After a redistribution, he went into the election sitting on a seemingly insurmountable majority of 19.6 percent—on paper, the fourth-safest CLP seat in the Territory. Additionally, Labor has usually run dead in Alice Springs. It had only come close to winning a seat in inner Alice Springs twice before 2016, and had never come particularly close to winning Braitling. However, on election night, Giles lost 20 percent of his primary vote from 2012. ABC projections showed him trailing Labor challenger Dale Wakefield, with Giles on 49.9 percent to Wakefield's 50.1 percent—a lead that increased as returns came in during the week after the election. By 2 September, Wakefield led Giles by 23 votes—well within the threshold for a recount under Territory election law. The recount took place on 5 September, and confirmed that Wakefield was still leading on a knife-edge. When the final result was announced, Wakefield won the seat with a margin of 27 votes on a swing of 19.9 percent, making Giles the second Majority Leader/Chief Minister to lose his own seat. At this same election, Mills, the man Giles had rolled three years earlier, took back his old seat as an independent. Even before it was confirmed that Giles had been rolled in his own seat, he resigned as leader of what remained of the CLP, and Higgins was elected his successor.

Giles later told AM that he had known for some time that the CLP would not be re-elected, but felt compelled to "put on a shiny face with the pearly whites" in order to maintain morale. Despite leading the CLP to such a massive defeat, he has expressed interest in running for the Senate, prompting former Chief Minister Shane Stone to demand that Giles stay in the Territory in order to "repent" and "help repair the damage" to the CLP.

== Media career ==
On 6 May 2018, Giles began hosting a weekly half-hour discussion show on Sky News Australia, titled The Adam Giles Show.

In August 2018, Giles conducted an interview with Blair Cottrell, chairman of the far-right extremist group the United Patriots Front (UPF). Following a public outcry, Giles's program was put "in recess", and Sky News stated it regretted featuring the interview on the channel, and that it was an "error of judgement". The show returned to air two months later in October.

== See also ==
- 2013 Country Liberal Party leadership spill
- 2015 Country Liberal Party leadership spill
- 2016 Northern Territory general election

Northern Territory Legislative Assembly
Preceded by Loraine Braham	Member for Braitling; 2008–2016	Succeeded by Dale Wakefield
Political offices
Preceded by Terry Mills	Chief Minister of the Northern Territory; 2013–2016	Succeeded by Michael Gunner
Preceded by John Elferink	Treasurer of the Northern Territory; 2015–2016	Succeeded by Nicole Manison
Party political offices
Preceded by Terry Mills	Leader of the Country Liberal Party in the Northern Territory; 2013–2016	Succeeded by Gary Higgins
