= 2015 Country Liberal Party leadership spill =

- 2–3 February 2015
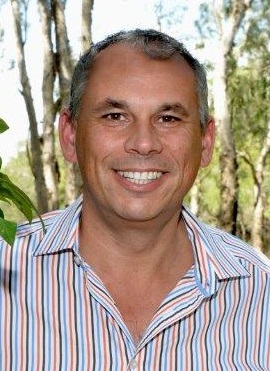

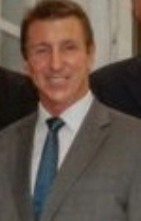
Candidate	Adam Giles	Willem Westra van Holthe
Caucus vote	5	9
Percentage	35.7%	64.3%
Seat	Braitling	Katherine
Leader before election
Adam Giles
Elected Leader
Adam Giles

A leadership spill of the Country Liberal Party in the Northern Territory occurred 2–3 February 2015.

Minister for Primary Industry and Mines Willem Westra van Holthe announced in a late night press conference on 2 February that the CLP had elected him as its new leader and hence Chief Minister of the Northern Territory, replacing Adam Giles. According to Westra van Holthe, the vote took place by phone, resulting in a 9 to 5 vote in favour of rolling Giles. Attorney-General John Elferink had been named as deputy leader, and hence Deputy Chief Minister.

However, Giles refused to resign, and the Administrator of the Northern Territory, John Hardy, declined to sack Giles. Hardy cited perceived irregularities in the spill process and doubt over whether Westra van Holthe would be able to maintain the confidence of the Northern Territory Legislative Assembly. While Westra van Holthe appeared to have the support of the majority of the CLP party room, there was no guarantee he could command a majority on the floor of the Assembly—and with it, enough support to govern.

Under pressure from the CLP's organisational wing, the CLP party room met on the afternoon of 3 February to break the impasse. At that meeting, an agreement was reached between the Giles and Westra van Holthe factions whereby Giles would continue as leader, and Westra van Holthe would become his deputy. Westra van Holthe ruled out another leadership challenge against Giles.

== Background ==
Adam Giles became Chief Minister of the Northern Territory in March 2013, replacing long-term Country Liberal leader Terry Mills in a party-room coup while Mills was attending a trade mission in Japan, becoming the first Indigenous head of government in modern Australian history. Initially he was popular with the electorate, however a series of scandals and problems shook his authority, including the defection of MPs Alison Anderson and Larisa Lee, and the resignation under a cloud of Northern Territory police commissioner John McRoberts. Giles' style was frequently compared to that of Queensland Premier Campbell Newman, which became a liability when Newman lost his seat in the 2015 state election.

== Impasse ==
At his press conference, Westra van Holthe promised to govern in a more consultative manner than Giles. He also stated that Giles had agreed to stand down. However, the swearing-in ceremony scheduled for 3 February was cancelled when Giles refused to resign. Australian constitutional practice calls for a first minister (Prime Minister at the federal level, premier at the state level, and chief minister at the territorial level) to stay in office unless they resign or are defeated in the legislature. The Legislative Assembly was in recess and was not due to sit again for two weeks. Hardy refused to call the legislature back to Darwin. This prompted Westra van Holthe to draw up an instrument allowing Hardy to use his reserve power to sack Giles and commission Westra van Holthe in his place.

At a press conference later that day, Giles declared that he was still Chief Minister because he had the support of the legislature—implying that he would topple Westra van Holthe and force new elections unless Westra van Holthe backed down. If the CLP members who supported Giles in the leadership vote joined Giles in breaking party discipline, Westra van Holthe would have faced being defeated on the floor of the Assembly at his first sitting. Additionally, if Giles and his close friend, Dave Tollner, had resigned, the CLP faced the prospect of losing government if it lost Giles' seat of Braitling and Tollner's seat of Fong Lim at by-elections. A wave of resignations raised doubts about whether the CLP had enough members to retain its registration. Opposition Leader Delia Lawrie and federal Labor MP Warren Snowdon both called for new elections.

Rolf Gerritsen, a research fellow at Charles Darwin University, likened the spill to the party-room coups that characterised the CLP in the 1980s and 1990s—an era which saw four chief ministers in 15 years, including three in four years.

== Resolution ==
Under pressure from the CLP's organisational wing, the CLP party room met on the afternoon of 3 February to break the impasse. At that meeting, an agreement was reached between the Giles and Westra van Holthe factions whereby Giles would continue as leader, with Westra van Holthe as his deputy. Westra van Holthe ruled out another leadership challenge against Giles. Speaker Kezia Purick and Minister for Community Services Bess Price reportedly threatened to resign from the CLP unless Giles was reinstated, which would have cost the CLP its majority. Giles later sacked Health Minister and Westra van Holthe supporter Robyn Lambley from cabinet, saying that the coup had put "the [Government's] faith at risk with Territorians," and Lambley needed to "take some responsibility" for her role.

Giles announced a new cabinet on 10 February; Transport Minister Matt Conlan, a supporter of the spill, resigned and moved to the backbench "to spend time with his family", and former Treasurer Dave Tollner, who had been forced to resign in August 2014, was reinstated into the ministry as Treasurer. The Guardian reported that Conlan's departure had been expected following the failure of the spill.

A year after the spill, the CLP was thrown from office in the worst defeat ever suffered by a sitting government in Territory history. Both Giles and Westra van Holthe lost their own seats.

== See also ==
- Country Liberal Party leadership spill, 2013
- 2016 Northern Territory general election#Opinion polling
