= Terry Mills (Australian politician) =

Australian politician (born 1957)

The Honourable Terry Mills
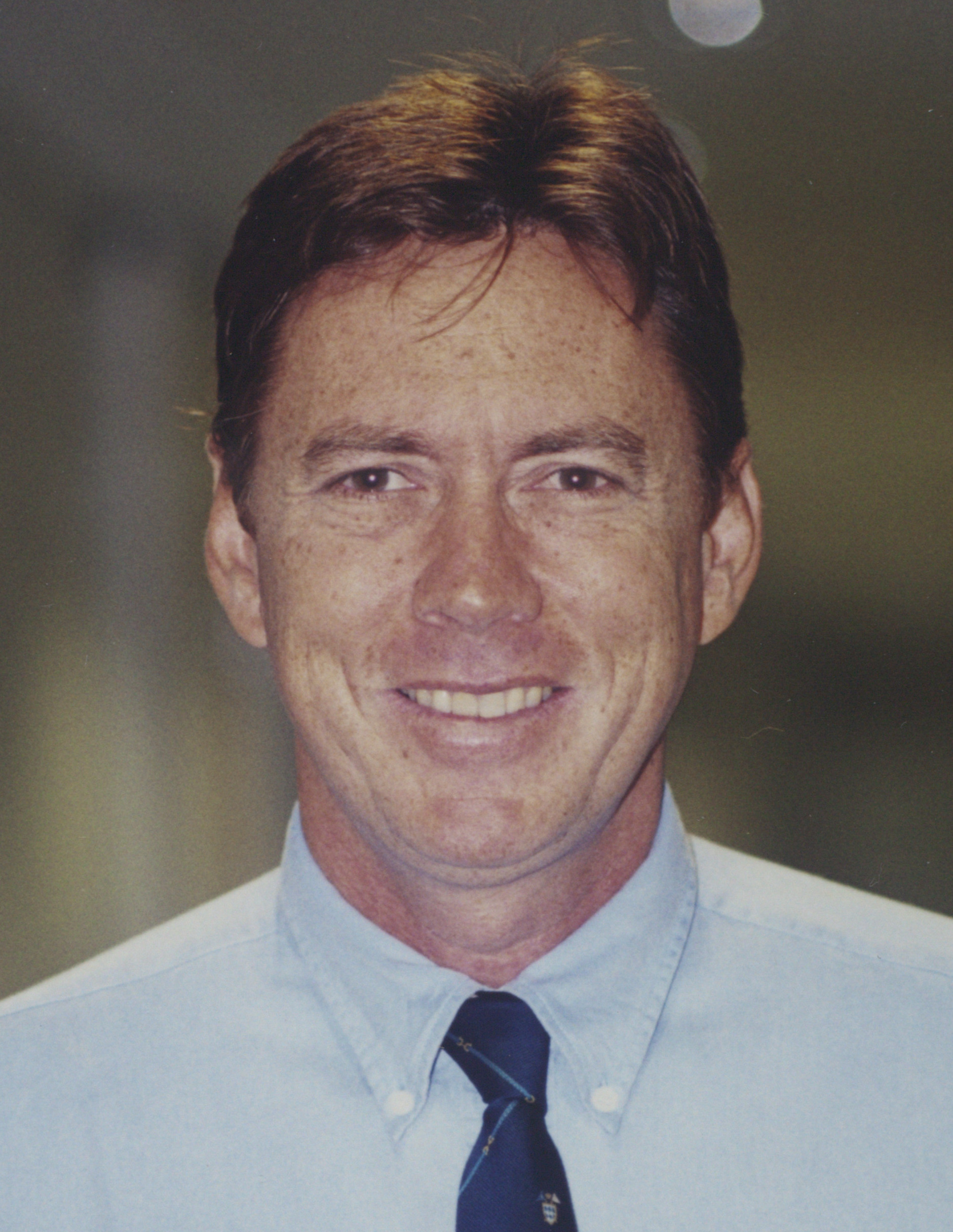
- Mills in 2005

9th Chief Minister of the Northern Territory
- In office 29 August 2012 – 13 March 2013
- Deputy: Robyn Lambley (2012–2013); Willem Westra van Holthe (2013)
- Administrator: Sally Thomas
- Preceded by: Paul Henderson
- Succeeded by: Adam Giles

8th Leader of the Opposition in the Northern Territory
- In office 29 January 2008 – 29 August 2012
- Preceded by: Jodeen Carney
- Succeeded by: Delia Lawrie
- In office 15 November 2003 – 4 February 2005
- Preceded by: Denis Burke
- Succeeded by: Denis Burke

Member of the Northern Territory Parliament for Blain
- In office 31 July 1999 – 20 February 2014
- Preceded by: Barry Coulter
- Succeeded by: Nathan Barrett
- In office 27 August 2016 – 22 August 2020
- Preceded by: Nathan Barrett
- Succeeded by: Mark Turner

Personal details
- Born: Terence Kennedy Mills; 22 December 1957 (age 68) Geraldton, Western Australia
- Party: Territory Alliance (2019–present)
- Other political affiliations: Country Liberal (1999–2016); Independent (2016–2019)
- Spouse: Ros Serich
- Education: Western Australian College of Advanced Education
- Cabinet: Mills Ministry

Terence Kennedy Mills (born 22 December 1957) is an Australian politician. He served as chief minister of the Northern Territory from 2012 to 2013 and was leader of the Country Liberal Party (CLP) from 2003 to 2005 and 2008 to 2013.

Mills, who had been the principal of a Christian school, was first elected to the Northern Territory Legislative Assembly in 1999, representing the seat of Blain. He was CLP leader and leader of the opposition from 2003 to 2005, but was replaced before contesting an election. He returned to the leadership in 2008, gaining seven seats at the 2008 election and then forming a majority government after the 2012 election. He spent less than a year as chief minister before being replaced by Adam Giles following a leadership spill.

Mills resigned from the Legislative Assembly in 2014, but successfully recontested his former seat at the 2016 election as an independent. In 2019 he announced the formation of a new party, the Territory Alliance. He was joined by two other incumbent MLAs in early 2020, allowing the Alliance to surpass the CLP as the second-largest party in the Legislative Assembly, but lost his seat at the 2020 election.

== Early life ==
Mills was born in Geraldton, Western Australia, and lived in the agricultural town of Mullewa for a time with his parents, Bernard and Patricia. He was educated at St Patrick's College, Geraldton (now Nagle Catholic College), before moving to Perth and gaining a Diploma of Education at the Western Australian College of Advanced Education. In 1983, he commenced teaching at a private school in Perth, and in the same year married Roslyn Matilda Serich. They had one son and one daughter. In 1989, the family moved to the Northern Territory, where Mills became principal of a Christian school.

== Political career ==
Mills joined the Country Liberal Party in the 1990s, and in a 1999 by-election, was elected to the seat of Blain in the Northern Territory Legislative Assembly. Initially, he served as Chairman of Committees. In 2001, following the defeat of the Country Liberal government, he assumed the shadow portfolios of Youth Affairs, Education, Employment and Training, and Sport and Recreation. On 14 November 2003, he replaced Denis Burke as Leader of the Opposition, and assumed the portfolios of Shadow Treasurer, Asian Relations and Trade, Territory Development, Railways, Racing and Gaming. He resigned on 4 February 2005 to be replaced by Burke, who subsequently lost the 2005 election and his own seat. Mills himself suffered a 9.5 percent swing amid the massive Labor wave that swept through the Territory. He was left as the only CLP member from Palmerston, an area that has historically been a CLP stronghold. He was the only CLP member holding a Darwin-area seat in the Legislative Assembly, and one of only two CLP members from the Top End.

Northern Territory Legislative Assembly
Years	Term	Electoral division	Party
1999–2001	8th	Blain	Country Liberal
2001–2005	9th	Blain	Country Liberal
2005–2008	10th	Blain	Country Liberal
2008–2012	11th	Blain	Country Liberal
2012–2014	12th	Blain	Country Liberal
2016–2019	13th	Blain	Independent
2019–2020	Changed allegiance to:		Territory Alliance

Mills served as deputy opposition leader to Jodeen Carney for three years. On 29 January 2008, however, Mills asked Carney if she was willing to swap posts with him, with Mills taking over as leader and Carney becoming his deputy. Carney turned the proposal down and instead called for a leadership spill. The vote was tied at two votes for Carney and two votes for Mills. Carney, taking a cue from the action of former Australian prime minister John Gorton in 1971, announced that a tie vote was not a vote of confidence and resigned. Mills then took the leadership unopposed on a second vote.

At the August 2008 election, the CLP increased its representation to 11 seats (from four in the old parliament), regaining much of what it had lost in its severe beating of three years earlier. This rose further in 2012 when Labor-turned-independent MP Alison Anderson, with Mills' encouragement, joined the CLP.

=== Chief Minister ===
At the 2012 general election, the CLP won government on a four-seat swing, primarily due to a large swing in remote Aboriginal areas which had historically supported Labor. Mills was sworn in as Chief Minister of the Northern Territory on 29 August 2012.

When Mills was in opposition in 2011, he stated his support for an audit of the Northern Territory finances, saying that "[an audit] will be the start of a new era of transparency in government expenditure." However, after coming into power he changed his mind on the issue.

In February 2013, following a large swing to Labor in the Wanguri by-election, canvassing took place within the CLP to gauge support for a challenge to Mills from his Attorney-General, John Elferink. Lacking the support of key MLAs, Elferink ruled out a challenge and offered his resignation to Mills, which was declined. In early March, Mills was unsuccessfully challenged by Health Minister Dave Tollner, who was sacked from Mills' cabinet after a six-and-a-half-hour party meeting. A little over one week later, on 13 March 2013, Mills, who was overseas at the time, was ousted by Transport Minister Adam Giles in an 11–5 vote of his party's parliamentary caucus. Following the leadership change, Tollner was promoted from the back bench to Deputy Chief Minister. Mills could have refused to resign as chief minister, however, was not aware of the procedures surrounding handing in commission of office.

Mills' tenure as Chief Minister of the Northern Territory lasted 197 days, making him the shortest serving chief minister of the Northern Territory by time in office.

=== Resignation ===
Mills resigned from Parliament on 20 February 2014, which triggered the 2014 Blain by-election. Giles appointed Mills as the Territory's commissioner to Indonesia and ASEAN. When Giles was nearly ousted as Chief Minister by Mills' former deputy, Willem Westra van Holthe, in February 2015, Mills tweeted a picture of himself laughing in delight, prompting Giles to sack him.

=== 2016 independent comeback ===
Mills announced on 7 August 2016 that he had resigned from the CLP and would seek to regain his former seat of Blain as an independent at the 2016 election. He likened the Giles government to a car accident, saying, "At the scene of an accident, one has a moral obligation to render assistance." Mills finished six points behind Labor candidate and former federal MP Damian Hale on the primary vote, pushing the CLP into third place. He narrowly overtook Hale on CLP preferences, allowing him to return to the legislature after a nearly two-year absence.

Mills joined his original Deputy Chief Minister, Robyn Lambley, on the crossbench; Lambley had left the CLP in 2015, but easily won reelection as an independent. Ironically, at the same election at which Mills retook his old seat as an independent, the man who had rolled him as Chief Minister, Giles, became the second Majority Leader/Chief Minister to lose his own seat. In October 2018 Mills announced the planned formation of the North Australia Party, later to become the Territory Alliance. He planned to become the opposition in the Northern Territory parliament after the collapse of the CLP vote left them with only 2 members in parliament.

=== Claim to Opposition Leadership ===
On 18 March 2020, Mills claimed to be the Leader of the Opposition, after Territory Alliance became the largest non-government party when Lambley joined the party. On 24 March 2020, Mills presented a Shadow Ministry and was referred to as Opposition Leader by Government MLAs, but his claim to Opposition status had not been formalised by the Legislative Assembly. Later that day, CLP leader Lia Finocchiaro successfully moved a motion to declare the Opposition Leadership vacant and hold a ballot to determine it. With most Labor members abstaining on the ballot, Finocchiaro won the ballot 5 votes to 3, and was confirmed as Opposition Leader.

Despite Territory Alliance being denied official Opposition status, Mills as Territory Alliance leader took part in the leaders' debate with Finocchiaro and Labor Chief Minister Michael Gunner at the 2020 election. This marks the first time anywhere in Australia that a leaders' debate included a third participant.

At the 2020 election, Mills was pushed into third place on the primary vote and was eliminated. However, his preference flowed about 62% to the CLP and 38% to the ALP which was enough to elect Labor's Mark Turner who had led the field on the primary vote.

== Political views ==
Mills was one of four MLAs who opposed a bill that decriminalised abortion in the Northern Territory.

== See also ==
- 2012 Northern Territory general election

Northern Territory Legislative Assembly
Preceded by Barry Coulter	Member for Blain; 1999–2014	Succeeded by Nathan Barrett
Preceded by Nathan Barrett	Member for Blain; 2016–2020	Succeeded by Mark Turner
Political offices
Preceded by Denis Burke	Leader of the Opposition of the Northern Territory; 2003–2005	Succeeded by Denis Burke
Preceded by Jodeen Carney	Leader of the Opposition of the Northern Territory; 2008–2012	Succeeded by Delia Lawrie
Preceded by Paul Henderson	Chief Minister of the Northern Territory; 2012–2013	Succeeded by Adam Giles
Party political offices
Preceded by Denis Burke	Leader of the Country Liberal Party; 2003–2005	Succeeded by Denis Burke
Preceded by Jodeen Carney	Leader of the Country Liberal Party; 2008–2013	Succeeded by Adam Giles
New political party	Leader of the Territory Alliance; 2019–present	Incumbent
