= Ray Hanrahan =

Australian politician

Raymond Allan Hanrahan (born 25 August 1952) is an Australian former politician. He was the Country Liberal Party member for Flynn in the Northern Territory Legislative Assembly from 1983 to 1988. He was Deputy Chief Minister of the Northern Territory from March 1987 to April 1988.

Northern Territory Legislative Assembly
Years	Term	Electoral division	Party
1983–1987	4th	Flynn	Country Liberal
1987–1988	5th	Flynn	Country Liberal

He was a minister in the Tuxworth and Hatton governments, serving as Minister for Health (1985–1986), Minister for Youth, Sport, Recreation and Ethnic Affairs (1985–1986), Minister for Business, Technology and Communications (1986–1987), Minister for Tourism (1986–1988), Minister for Lands and Housing (1987), Minister for Conservation (1987) and Minister for Education (1987–1988).

He resigned suddenly as Deputy Chief Minister and from Cabinet on 5 April 1988, stating that he was "wrestling with a certain problem" in his personal life, later revealed to be an extramarital affair. He subsequently resigned from the Country Liberal Party and then resigned from parliament altogether in August 1988. The subsequent by-election saw the CLP lose the safe seat to Northern Territory Nationals candidate Enzo Floreani.

Hanrahan was a Town of Alice Springs alderman before entering territory politics.

Northern Territory Legislative Assembly
New seat	Member for Flynn; 1983–1988	Succeeded by Enzo Floreani
