= 1999 Blain by-election =

31 July 1999
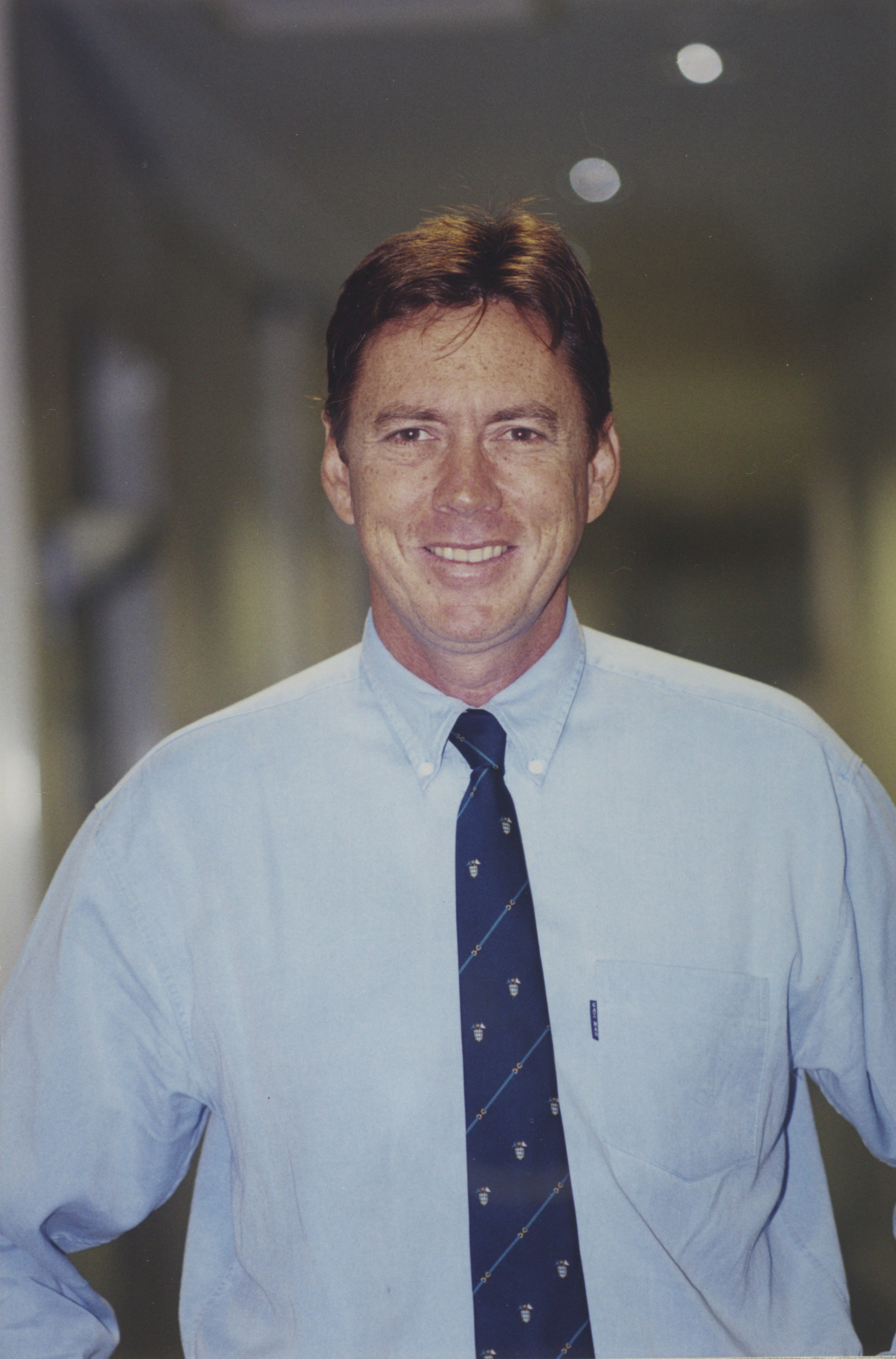

	First party	Second party	Third party
			IND
Candidate	Terry Mills	Nicole Cridland	Peter Gandofi
Party	Country Liberal	Labor	Independent
Popular vote	1,599	1,396	352
Percentage	46.4%	40.5%	10.2%
Swing	▼27.4	▲14.3	▲10.2
TPP	53.3%	46.7%
TPP swing	▼20.5	▲20.5
MP before election
Barry Coulter
Country Liberal
Elected MP
Terry Mills
Country Liberal

A by-election for the seat of Blain in the Northern Territory Legislative Assembly was held on 31 July 1999. The by-election was triggered by the resignation of Country Liberal Party (CLP) member Barry Coulter, a former Deputy Chief Minister. Coulter had held Blain, and its predecessors Berrimah and Palmerston, since 1983.

The CLP selected Terry Mills, a private school Principal, as its candidate. The Labor candidate was Nicole Cridland.

== Results ==
Blain by-election, 1999
Party	Candidate	Votes	%	±%
Country Liberal	Terry Mills	1,599	46.4	−27.4
Labor	Nicole Cridland	1,396	40.5	+14.3
Independent	Peter Gandolfi	352	10.2	+10.2
Greens	Beryl Brugmans	101	2.9	+2.9
Total formal votes		3,448	96.6	+3.7
Informal votes		122	3.4	−3.7
Turnout		3,570	77.4	−11.4
Two-party-preferred result
Country Liberal	Terry Mills	1,838	53.3	−20.5
Labor	Nicole Cridland	1,610	46.7	+20.5
Country Liberal hold		Swing	−20.5	
