= Electoral division of Flynn =

Former electoral division of the Northern Territory

Flynn was an electoral division of the Legislative Assembly in Australia's Northern Territory. It existed between 1983 and 1990 and was named after John Flynn, founder of the Royal Flying Doctor Service.

== Members for Flynn ==
Member	Party	Term
Ray Hanrahan	Country Liberal	1983–1988
Enzo Floreani	NT Nationals	1988–1990

== Election results ==
=== Elections in the 1980s ===
1983 Northern Territory general election: Flynn
Party	Candidate	Votes	%	±%
Country Liberal	Ray Hanrahan	1306	67.7	
Labor	Peter Hughes	564	29.2	
Independent	Pamela Gardeiner	60	3.1	
Total formal votes		1,930	96.7	
Informal votes		65	3.3	
Turnout		1,995	82.4	
Two-party-preferred result
Country Liberal	Ray Hanrahan	1,336	69.2	
Labor	Peter Hughes	594	30.8	
Country Liberal hold		Swing		

1987 Northern Territory general election: Flynn
Party	Candidate	Votes	%	±%
Country Liberal	Ray Hanrahan	829	50.6	−17.1
NT Nationals	Jacqueline Anderson	412	25.1	+25.1
Labor	John Omond	399	24.3	−4.9
Total formal votes		1,640	96.7	
Informal votes		56	3.3	
Turnout		1,696	63.7	
Two-party-preferred result
Country Liberal	Ray Hanrahan	1,132	69.0	0.0
Labor	John Omond	508	31.0	0.0
Country Liberal hold		Swing	0.0	

- Two party preferred vote is estimated.

1988 Flynn by-election
Party	Candidate	Votes	%	±%
Labor	Di Shanahan	694	39.3	+15.0
NT Nationals	Enzo Floreani	553	31.3	+6.2
Country Liberal	June Tuzewski	520	29.4	−21.2
Total formal votes		2,941	95.7	−1.1
Informal votes		133	4.3	+1.1
Turnout		3,074	75.8	−7.0
Two-candidate-preferred result
NT Nationals	Enzo Floreani	979	55.4	+55.4
Labor	Di Shanahan	788	44.6	+13.6
NT Nationals gain from Country Liberal		Swing	N/A	
