= Bob Collins (politician) =

Australian politician (1946–2007)

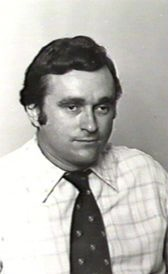
- Collins in 1981

Senator for the Northern Territory
- In office 11 July 1987 – 30 March 1998
- Preceded by: Ted Robertson
- Succeeded by: Trish Crossin

Leader of the Opposition of the Northern Territory
- In office 2 November 1981 – 19 August 1986
- Preceded by: Jon Isaacs
- Succeeded by: Terry Smith

Personal details
- Born: Robert Lindsay Collins; 8 February 1946 Newcastle, New South Wales, Australia
- Died: 21 September 2007 (aged 61) Darwin, Northern Territory, Australia
- Party: Labor Party
- Spouse: Rosemary Collins

Robert Lindsay Collins AO (8 February 1946 – 21 September 2007) was an Australian politician. He was a Labor Party member of the Australian Senate from July 1987 to March 1998, representing the Northern Territory. Prior to entering the Senate, Collins was a member of the Northern Territory Legislative Assembly from 1977 to 1987, and Leader of the Territory Opposition from 1981 to 1986. He was the first Northern Territorian to become a federal minister. He killed himself after being charged with child sex offences.

== Early life ==
Born into a working-class family in Newcastle in 1946, Collins left school at the age of 15 and worked briefly on a cotton farm. In 1967, he moved to the Northern Territory, where he found work at the Department of Agriculture in the town of Katherine. By 1974, he was working for the Commonwealth Scientific and Industrial Research Organisation (CSIRO) and St John Ambulance when Cyclone Tracy struck the city of Darwin.

== Territory politics ==
Northern Territory Legislative Assembly
Years	Term	Electoral division	Party
1977–1980	2nd	Arnhem	Labor
1980–1983	3rd	Arnhem	Labor
1983–1987	4th	Arafura	Labor

Collins first became politically active in the late 1970s while employed as a market gardener and wildlife officer in the Indigenous community of Maningrida in Arnhem Land. In 1977, he was asked to run for the Labor Party in the seat of Arnhem, which he did, successfully gaining a seat in the second parliament of the Northern Territory Legislative Assembly. He was Leader of the Opposition from 1981 to 1986 while the Country Liberal Party held power, switching to the newly created seat of Arafura in December 1983. At the territorial election of 1983, his party was defeated; and incumbent Chief Minister Paul Everingham was the victor. Collins was Leader of the Opposition in the Northern Territory for four years, championing the then unpopular causes of overturning the verdict against Lindy Chamberlain over the disappearance of her daughter Azaria at Uluru; and backing the return of Uluru to its traditional owners.

== Federal politics and the Senate ==
At the 1987 federal election, Collins was elected to the Australian Senate representing the Northern Territory. He served as a senator for almost eleven years. The Prime Minister Bob Hawke chose Collins as Minister for Shipping on 4 April 1990, and a month later Aviation Support was added to his portfolio. He also served as Minister assisting the Prime Minister for Northern Australia. In May 1992, Prime Minister Paul Keating elevated Collins to the Cabinet as Minister for Transport and Communications. In December 1993, he was made Minister for Primary Industries and Energy.

After the Coalition led by John Howard won the 1996 election, Collins continued to serve in the Senate until he resigned on 30 March 1998. Trish Crossin was appointed to fill his previous Senate seat.

== Co-ordinator of the Anangu Pitjantjatjara lands ==
After he left federal politics in 1998, Collins took on various projects on boosting Aboriginal education, tackling petrol sniffing and landscape conservation. In March 2004, the Premier of South Australia, Mike Rann, appointed Collins as the service delivery co-ordinator of the Anangu Pitjantjatjara lands in South Australia's north. He was tasked with rectifying some of the vast social problems in the region. Collins resigned from the position in August 2004.

== Honours ==
In the Australia Day Honours of 2004, Collins was appointed an Officer of the Order of Australia (AO) for services to the Northern Territory and Indigenous rights.

== Child sex allegations ==
In June 2004, Collins was involved in a serious single-car accident when his car rolled over near the town of Jabiru. He was taken to Royal Darwin Hospital, then flown to Adelaide on 22 June for specialised surgery. As Collins recovered in hospital, officers of the Northern Territory Police flew to his hospital bedside to inform him his home had been raided and he was charged with child-sex offences. His home computer had been seized, and prosecutors said this computer contained 54 child pornography images. Additionally, four men had made allegations that Collins had sexually assaulted them as children, more than 30 years previously. One of the alleged victims was Tom E. Lewis, a young actor who had played the title role in the 1978 Australian film The Chant of Jimmie Blacksmith. The Northern Territory Director of Public Prosecutions supported a move by Collins's defence lawyers to suppress all details of the court case, including media reporting of the case.

Another allegation was made in 2006 of the sexual assault of a 12-year-old boy in Canberra in September 1989. Collins was charged with two counts of committing an act of indecency and one count of sexual intercourse with a child.

Collins's continuing medical problems, including surgery for bowel cancer and injuries from his car accident, meant he was unfit to attend the ACT Magistrates' Court for four scheduled hearings of the case in September and December 2006 and March and May 2007.

An additional charge of possession of child pornography was set down against Collins in the Darwin Magistrates' Court in November 2006. Collins faced 21 child sex charges in the Northern Territory which were due for a committal hearing in April 2007. The child pornography charge was due for a hearing in the same court on 1 May. Collins died by suicide before facing court.

Five of Collins' alleged victims were paid compensation under the Victims of Crime (Assistance) Act, after claims for compensation were accepted by the Northern Territory government.

== Death ==
Collins died in Darwin on 21 September 2007, three days before he was scheduled to face court. Given the circumstances of unexplained death, a detailed coronial investigation was carried out into the death, reporting in February 2009. The Northern Territory Coroner stated: "The cause of death was intentional overdose of prescription drugs with alcohol following upon a background of three years of significant medical difficulties and in the face of upcoming court cases. I find that the deceased took the drugs with the purpose of ending his life." The Coroner stated that, although it was not his usual practice to release findings relating to intentional self-harm:

I have decided to release the following information from the coronial findings into the death of Robert Lindsay Collins, because of the intense public and media speculation. I have discussed this with Mr Collins' family who, whilst saddened that this release is necessary, understand that there is a need to clarify the circumstances of his death.

The family held a private funeral.

== Posthumous controversy ==
A portrait of Bob Collins is hung in the Parliament House of the Northern Territory along with all former Leaders of the Opposition. Country Liberal MLA John Elferink drew attention to this in June 2009, as he felt the portrait's presence was inappropriate due to the child abuse allegations against Bob Collins. In response to the request Speaker Jane Aagaard announced in October 2009 that after review the House Committee had decided the portrait was a historical record and would remain.

Political offices
Preceded by Jon Isaacs	Opposition Leader of the Northern Territory; 1981–1986	Succeeded by Terry Smith
Preceded by Bob Brown	Minister for Shipping (and Aviation Support); 1990–1992	Succeeded by Peter Cook
New title	Minister assisting the Prime Minister for Northern Australia; 1990–1992	Succeeded by Ben Humphreys
Preceded by Graham Richardson	Minister for Transport and Communications; 1992–1993	Succeeded by Laurie Brereton as Minister for Transport
Preceded by Graham Richardson	Minister for Transport and Communications; 1992–1993	Succeeded by Michael Lee as Minister for Communications and the Arts
Preceded by Simon Crean	Minister for Primary Industries and Energy; 1993–1996	Succeeded by John Anderson
Northern Territory Legislative Assembly
Preceded by Rupert Kentish	Member for Arnhem; 1977–1983	Succeeded by Wes Lanhupuy
New division	Member for Arafura; 1983–1987	Succeeded by Stan Tipiloura
Parliament of Australia
Preceded by Ted Robertson	Senator for the Northern Territory; 1987–1998; Served alongside: Grant Tambling	Succeeded by Trish Crossin
