= Rupert Kentish =

Australian politician

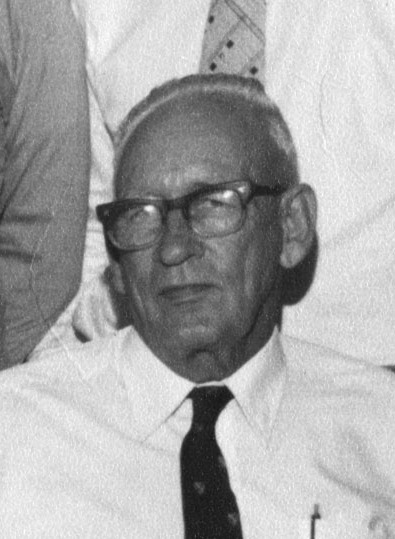
- Kentish in 1976

Member of the Northern Territory Legislative Assembly for Arnhem
- In office 19 October 1974 – 12 August 1977
- Preceded by: Division created
- Succeeded by: Bob Collins

Personal details
- Born: 26 June 1914 The Gums, Queensland, Australia
- Died: 20 December 1978 (aged 64) Darwin, Northern Territory, Australia
- Party: Country Liberal Party
- Profession: Businessman

Rupert James Kentish (26 June 1914 – 20 December 1978) was an Australian politician. He was a Country Party member of the Northern Territory Legislative Council from 1968 to 1974 and a Country Liberal Party member of the Northern Territory Legislative Assembly from 1974 to 1977.

Northern Territory Legislative Assembly
Years	Term	Electoral division	Party
1974–1977	1st	Arnhem	Country Liberal

Kentish was born at The Gums, Queensland and educated at the local school. He left school at 14 and worked as a timber-cutter and cane-cutter in North Queensland and for an Ipswich dairy. In 1938, he went to the Northern Territory as a missionary with the Methodist Overseas Mission, first at Goulburn Island, Yirrkala, Milingimbi Island, Gosford, New South Wales (during a World War II evacuation) and then Croker Island. In 1950, he relocated to the Darwin area, assisting a colleague in establishing an experimental farm and then setting up his own dairy and cattle farm. He was heavily involved in promoting the agricultural industry in the Northern Territory, and in later years ran a caravan park. He was a member of the Darwin Hospital Advisory Board, a prominent member of the Rotary Club of Darwin, and was involved in the Darwin Rotary Rodeo and the Darwin Show Society.

He was narrowly elected as a Country Party member of the Northern Territory Legislative Council in 1968, defeating George Winunduj, the first indigenous candidate for the Council, by 126 votes. Kentish served on the Legislative Council until its abolition in 1974. At the advent of self-governance, he was then elected as the Country Liberal Party member for Arnhem in the Northern Territory Legislative Assembly from 1974 until 1977, when he was soundly defeated by future Labor leader Bob Collins.

An arch-conservative, he claimed in 1970 that the conservative Northern Territory News was "communist propaganda" that was "helping to undermine the spiritual and moral life of Australia", claimed in 1971 that there was "not one Aborigine or part-Aborigine who is suitable to sit in the [Legislative] Council", and in 1973 was the only Country Party MP to vote against legalising nude bathing, declaring that "nudity had led to the fall of the Roman Empire". Although he had a history of controversial statements about indigenous people, his wife, Maluda, was a Torres Strait Islander woman; Les MacFarlane said in parliament upon his death that it "amused him to be called racist...'look at me, he would say...a racist and yet happily married to an Aborigine'. His CLP colleague, Hyacinth Tungutalum, the first Indigenous Australian MP in the Assembly, later said "Aborigines in particular should honour Rupert Kentish ... he did a lot for us".

He died in 1978.

Northern Territory Legislative Assembly
Preceded by New seat	Member for Arnhem; 1974–1977	Succeeded by Bob Collins
