= Nathan Barrett (politician) =

Australian politician

Member of the Northern Territory Legislative Assembly for Blain
- In office 12 April 2014 – 8 August 2016
- Preceded by: Terry Mills
- Succeeded by: Terry Mills

Personal details
- Born: 4 February 1976 (age 50) Darwin, Northern Territory
- Party: Country Liberal Party (2014–16); Independent (2016)
- Spouse: Rebecca Barrett
- Occupation: Port worker, Teacher, Politician

Nathan Barrett (born 4 February 1976) is an Australian former politician who represented the Northern Territory Legislative Assembly seat of Blain from 2014 to 2016.

== Background and early career ==
Barrett was born in Darwin, and has lived in Palmerston for over twenty years. He was a port worker and teacher before entering politics.

== Political career ==
Northern Territory Legislative Assembly
Years	Term	Electoral division	Party
2014–2016	13th	Blain	Country Liberal
2016	Changed allegiance to:		Independent

Barrett was elected at a by-election held on 12 April 2014 as a member of the governing Country Liberal Party. The vacancy was caused by the resignation of former Chief Minister Terry Mills. Although Blain, like most seats in the Palmerston area, had historically been CLP heartland, the by-election came at a difficult time for the CLP government. A week after the writ was issued, three indigenous CLP MPs defected to the crossbench. Had Barrett lost, the CLP would have been forced into a minority government. Ultimately, Barrett won, though the CLP suffered a swing of over 10 percent.

In February 2016, Barrett was promoted to Cabinet as Minister for Sport and Recreation, Minister for Young Territorians, and Minister Assisting the Treasurer. He was slated to become Treasurer after the 2016 estimates hearings. However, on 10 June, when Northern Territory News reported that he had sent a video of himself masturbating to a constituent with whom he had been having an affair, Barrett resigned from Cabinet.

On 12 June, under growing pressure from the CLP's organisational wing, he announced that he would not contest the upcoming election. He then resigned from the CLP on 28 June 2016, and served out the rest of his term as an independent. In a speech announcing his move to the crossbench, he accused his political enemies of resorting to a base attack to bring him down. At that election, Blain was won by Barrett's predecessor, Mills, who ran as an independent.

== See also ==
- Members of the Northern Territory Legislative Assembly, 2012–2016

Northern Territory Legislative Assembly
Preceded by Terry Mills	Member for Blain; 2014–2016	Succeeded by Terry Mills
