= 1995 Arnhem by-election =

7 October 1995
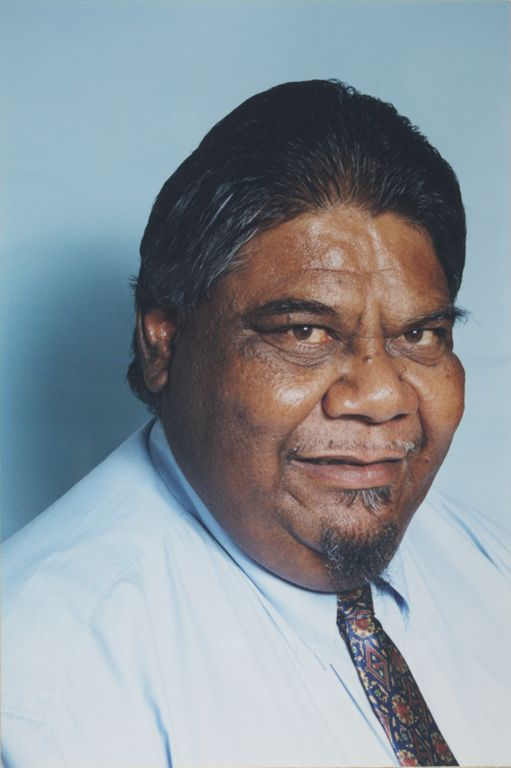

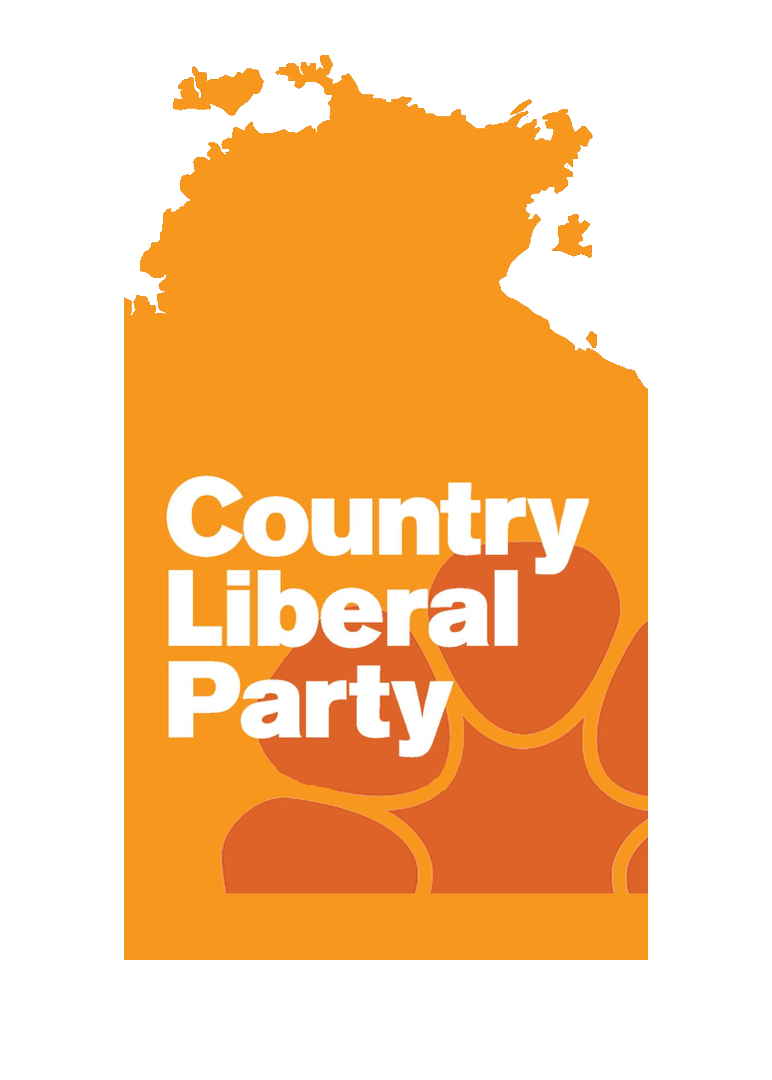
	First party	Second party	Third party
			IND
Candidate	Jack Ah Kit	Mujiji Nunggarrgulu; Terry Yumbulul	Lance Lawrence
Party	Labor	Country Liberal	Independent
Popular vote	1,195	710 (Note: Combined totals of both Country Liberal candidates are shown here.)	304
Percentage	51.8%	35.1%	13.1%
Swing	▼22.7	▲9.6	▲13.1
MP before election
Wes Lanhupuy
Labor
Elected MP
Jack Ah Kit
Labor

A by-election for the seat of Arnhem in the Northern Territory Legislative Assembly was held on 7 October 1995. The by-election was triggered by the resignation of Wes Lanhupuy, from the Labor Party.

The Country Liberal Party selected two candidates for the seat- Terry Yumbulul and Mujiji Nunggarrgulu. The Labor Party stood Jack Ah Kit as their candidate. The remaining candidate was independent Lance Lawrence.

== Results ==
1995 Arnhem by-election
Party	Candidate	Votes	%	±%
Labor	Jack Ah Kit	1,195	51.8	−22.7
Country Liberal	Mujiji Nunggarrgulu	500	21.7	+9.6 (Note: Swing calculated from the combined Country Liberal result this by-election rather than the individual results of the Country Liberal candidates.)
Country Liberal	Terry Yumbulul	310	13.4	+9.6
Independent	Lance Lawrence	304	13.1	+13.1
Labor hold		Swing	−22.7	
