= Oly Carlson =

Australian politician

Member of the Northern Territory Legislative Assembly for the Electoral division of Wanguri
- Incumbent
- Assumed office 24 August 2024
- Preceded by: Nicole Manison

Personal details
- Party: Country Liberal Party

Oly Carlson is an Australian politician from the Country Liberal Party.

In the 2024 Northern Territory general election, she was elected to the Northern Territory Legislative Assembly in Wanguri.

Carlson's father arrived in Darwin in 1937 and survived the Japanese Bombing of Darwin in 1942. She previously worked for the Commonwealth Bank in Darwin.

Northern Territory Legislative Assembly
Preceded by Nicole Manison	Member for Wanguri; 2024–present	Incumbent
