= Enzo Floreani =

Australian politician

Northern Territory Legislative Assembly
Years	Term	Electoral division	Party
1988–1990	5th	Flynn	Nationals

Enzo Alido Floreani (born 9 March 1945) is a former Australian politician. He was the member for Flynn in the Northern Territory Legislative Assembly from 1988 to 1990, as a member of Ian Tuxworth's NT Nationals party. Elected in a 1988 by-election, he and Tuxworth were the only representatives of the NT Nationals to win election; they were both defeated in 1990.

Northern Territory Legislative Assembly
Preceded by Ray Hanrahan	Member for Flynn; 1988–1990	Succeeded by Abolished
