= Jack Ah Kit =

Australian politician (1950–2020)

The Honourable Jack Ah Kit
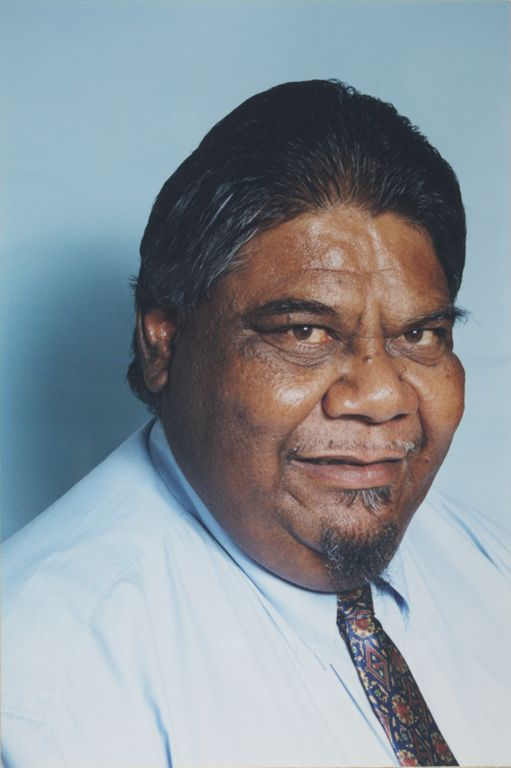
- Ah Kit in 2004

Member of the Parliament of the Northern Territory for Arnhem
- In office 7 October 1995 – 16 June 2005
- Preceded by: Wes Lanhupuy
- Succeeded by: Malarndirri McCarthy

Personal details
- Born: John Leonard Ah Kit; 22 July 1950 Alice Springs, Northern Territory, Australia
- Died: 12 July 2020 (aged 69) Darwin, Northern Territory, Australia
- Party: Labor Party
- Domestic partner: Gail Canendo
- Children: Ngaree Ah Kit, Jonathan Ah Kit

John Leonard Ah Kit (22 July 1950 – 12 July 2020) was an Australian politician. He was the Labor member for Arnhem in the Northern Territory Legislative Assembly from 1995 to 2005.

== Early life ==
Ah Kit was born on 22 July 1950 in Alice Springs, the fifth child in a Jawoyn family of 13. He moved with his family to Darwin in 1954. He attended Darwin and Parap primary schools and Darwin High School.

== Biography ==
In 1983, he was elected to the Full Council of the Northern Land Council (NLC) representing Aboriginal people in the Katherine region. In 1984 he was appointed Director of the Northern Land Council from 1984 to 1990. He resigned in 1990 to contest the seat of Goyder for the Labor Party. He played an important role in 1991 in Jawoyn efforts to stop the mining of gold, palladium and platinum at Coronation Hill in 1991, Ah Kit was instrumental in the Jawoyn traditional owners’ battle to prevent gold, palladium and platinum mining at Coronation Hill, the resting site of Jawoyn creator being Bula.

Ah Kit was executive director of the Jawoyn Association from 1991 to 1995 before his election to parliament in a by-election following the resignation of Wes Lanhupuy. He served as a minister in the first term of the Martin Government, a historical milestone as he was the first indigenous minister in the Territory's history. When elected to parliament, John Ah Kit became the ninth Indigenous parliamentarian in Australian history.

Northern Territory Legislative Assembly
Years	Term	Electoral division	Party
1995–1997	7th	Arnhem	Labor
1997–2001	8th	Arnhem	Labor
2001–2005	9th	Arnhem	Labor

While in parliament he held a number of portfolios:

- Minister for Community Development
- Minister for Housing
- Minister for Local Government
- Minister for Sport and Recreation
- Minister for Regional Development
- Minister assisting the Chief Minister on Indigenous Affairs

Ah Kit retired in 2005 citing ill health. His daughter Ngaree Ah Kit was elected to the Legislative Assembly in 2016. Ah Kit died at Royal Darwin Hospital on the evening of 12 July 2020, aged 69.

== Awards ==
- 2007 National NAIDOC Awards – Lifetime Achievement Award – John (Jak) Ah Kit
- Doctor of Letters Honoris Causa awarded by the Council of Charles Darwin University

Northern Territory Legislative Assembly
Preceded by Wes Lanhupuy	Member for Arnhem; 1995–2005	Succeeded by Malarndirri McCarthy
