= 1988 Flynn by-election =

Australian election

- 10 September 1988

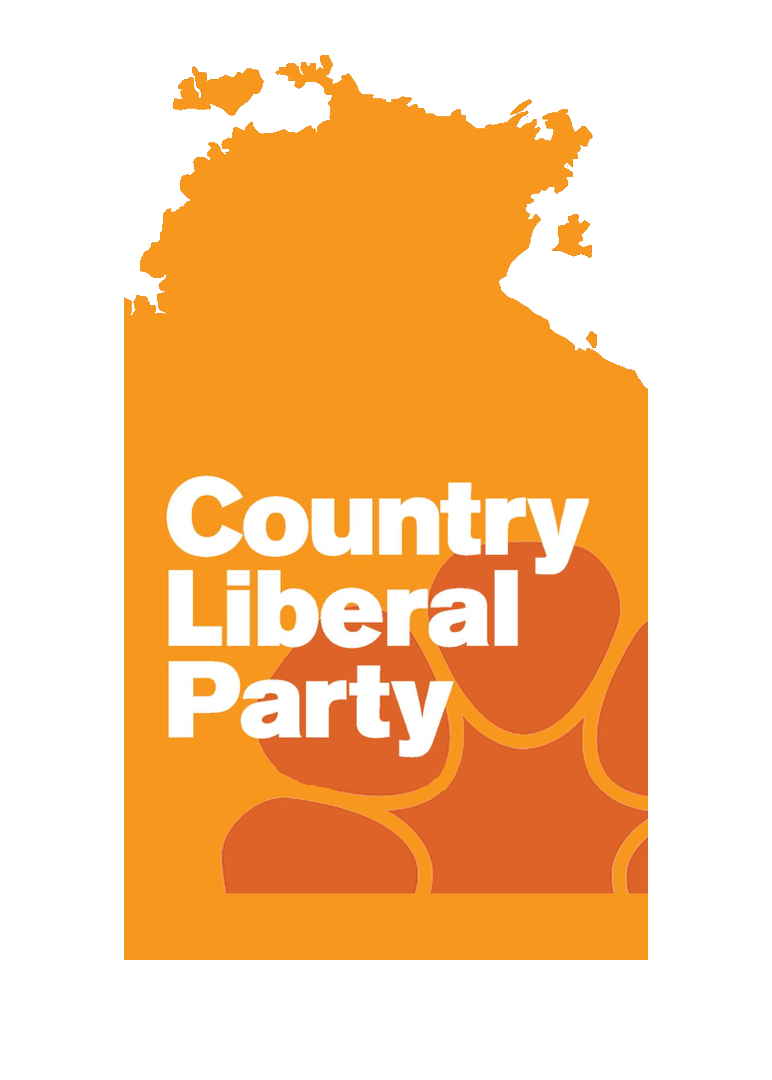
	First party	Second party	Third party
	NAT
Candidate	Enzo Floreani	Di Shanahan	June Tuzewski
Party	Nationals	Labor	Country Liberal
Popular vote	553	694	520
Percentage	31.3%	39.3%	29.4%
Swing	▲6.2	▲15.0	▼21.2
TPP	55.4%	44.6%
TPP swing	▲55.4	▲13.6
MP before election
Ray Hanrahan
Country Liberal
Elected MP
Enzo Floreani
Nationals

A by-election for the seat of Flynn in the Northern Territory Legislative Assembly was held on 10 September 1988. The by-election was triggered by the resignation of Country Liberal Party (CLP) member Ray Hanrahan, a former Deputy Chief Minister. The seat had been held by Hanrahan since its creation in 1987.

== Results ==
Flynn by-election, 1988
Party	Candidate	Votes	%	±%
Labor	Di Shanahan	694	39.3	+15.0
NT Nationals	Enzo Floreani	553	31.3	+6.2
Country Liberal	June Tuzewski	520	29.4	−21.2
Total formal votes		2,941	95.7	−1.1
Informal votes		133	4.3	+1.1
Turnout		3,074	75.8	−7.0
Two-candidate-preferred result
NT Nationals	Enzo Floreani	979	55.4	+55.4
Labor	Di Shanahan	788	44.6	+13.6
NT Nationals gain from Country Liberal		Swing	N/A	
