= Electoral division of Arnhem =

Coordinates: 14°31′15″S 132°51′54″E

Arnhem Northern Territory—Legislative Assembly
- Interactive map of boundaries as of the 2024 election
- Territory: Northern Territory
- Created: 1974
- MP: Selena Uibo
- Party: Labor Party
- Namesake: Arnhem Land
- Electors: 6,773 (2026)
- Area: 115,522 km^{2} (44,603.3 sq mi)
- Demographic: Remote
Electorates around Arnhem:
Daly	Arafura	Mulka
Katherine	Arnhem	Gulf of Carpentaria
Daly	Barkly	Barkly

Arnhem is an electoral division of the Legislative Assembly in Australia's Northern Territory. It was first created in 1974, and takes its name from Arnhem Land, the region encompassing much of the northern part of the Territory.

Arnhem includes the Arnhem Land towns of Barunga, Beswick, Mataranka, Jabiru and Kakadu. In the redistribution before the 2016 election, gained territory from Arafura and Stuart, while losing territory to Nhulunbuy. There were 6,773 people enrolled within the electorate as of July 2026.

== History ==
Arnhem was one of the initial electorates created along with the introduction of the Legislative Assembly in 1974. Though it consisted of predominantly indigenous towns which voted strongly for the Labor Party at a federal level, it was won by the Country Liberal Party amidst their landslide victory at the election of that year, in which the Labor Party won no seats. Arnhem returned to expectations at the 1977 election, when it was won by Labor candidate Bob Collins, who was elected leader of the party in 1981. After much of the northern portion of the seat was transferred to the new seat of Arafura in 1983, Collins transferred there and was succeeded in Arafura by new Labor candidate Wes Lanhupuy. Lanhupuy was comfortably re-elected three times, but died suddenly in 1995.

Labor candidate Jack Ah Kit won the 1995 by-election resulting from Lanhupuy's death, and went on to serve as a Cabinet minister in the Martin government from 2001. He retired at the 2005 election, with former ABC TV presenter Barbara McCarthy being comfortably elected as his replacement. McCarthy was reelected unopposed in 2008, only to be ousted by the CLP's Larisa Lee in 2012 as the CLP swept into government. Lee herself sat under three different banners during the next parliament, leaving the CLP to sit as an independent, joining the Palmer United Party, before returning to be an independent. Selena Uibo regained the seat for Labor at the 2016 election. Lee won only 117 votes or 4.0 percent, finishing in fifth and last place.

The high proportion of indigenous people in the Arnhem population has been reflected in the seat having had five consecutive indigenous MPs, and McCarthy (now a Senator) having been an outspoken advocate of indigenous rights in parliament.

== Members for Arnhem ==
Member	Party	Term
Rupert Kentish	Country Liberal	1974–1977
Bob Collins	Labor	1977–1983
Wes Lanhupuy	Labor	1983–1995
Jack Ah Kit	Labor	1995–2005
Malarndirri McCarthy	Labor	2005–2012
Larisa Lee	Country Liberal	2012–2014
Larisa Lee	Independent	2014
Larisa Lee	Palmer United	2014
Larisa Lee	Independent	2014–2016
Selena Uibo	Labor	2016–present

== Election results ==
2024 Northern Territory general election: Arnhem
Party	Candidate	Votes	%	±%
Labor	Selena Uibo	2,162	64.3	+22.6
Country Liberal	Ian Mongunu Gumbula	1,202	35.7	+20.4
Total formal votes		3,364	97.3	
Informal votes		92	2.7	
Turnout		3,456	52.0	
Labor hold		Swing	−3.3	
