= 1989 Wanguri by-election =

19 August 1989

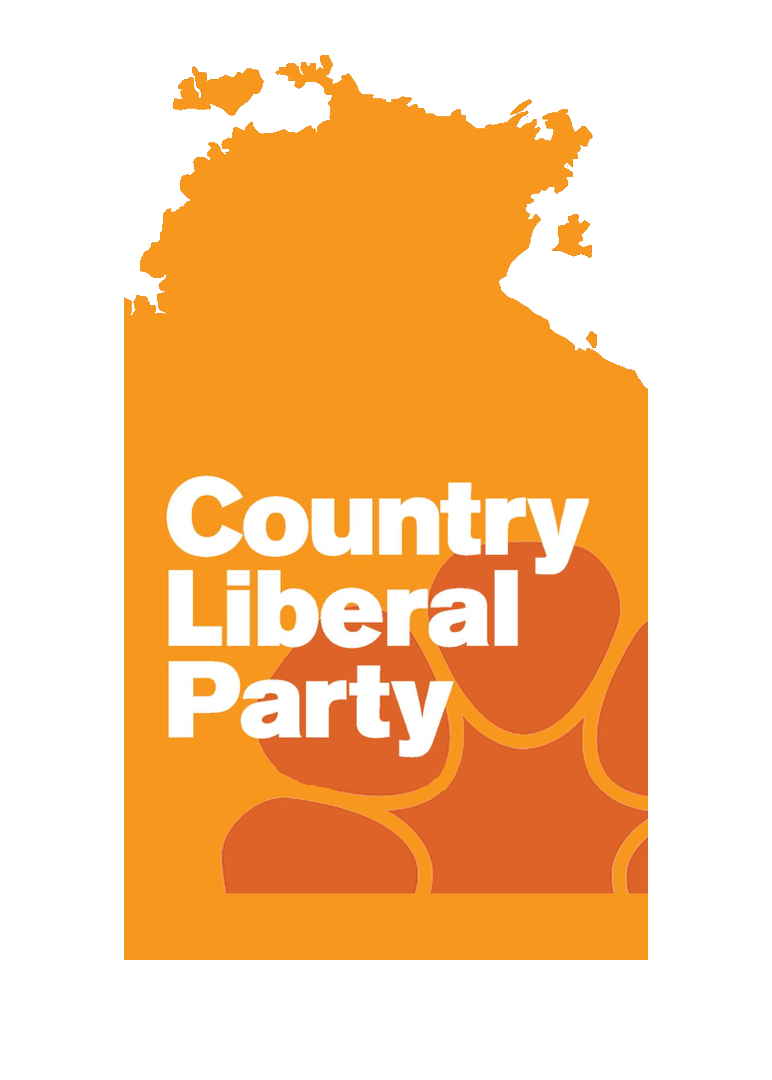

	First party	Second party
Candidate	John Bailey	John Taylor
Party	Labor	Country Liberal
Popular vote	1,000	686
Percentage	36.8%	25.3%
Swing	▲2.3	▼16.0
TPP	58.0%	42.0%
TPP swing	▲17.4	▼17.4
	Third party	Fourth party
		NAT
Candidate	Debra Beattie-Burnett	Graeme Bavis
Party	Greens	Nationals
Popular vote	453	442
Percentage	16.7%	16.3%
Swing	▲16.7	▼7.9
MP before election
Don Dale
Country Liberal
Elected MP
John Bailey
Labor

A by-election for the seat of Wanguri in the Northern Territory Legislative Assembly was held on 19 August 1989. The by-election was triggered by the resignation of Country Liberal Party (CLP) Cabinet Minister Don Dale. The seat had been held by Dale since its creation in 1983.

== Results ==
Wanguri by-election, 1989
Party	Candidate	Votes	%	±%
Labor	John Bailey	1,000	36.8	+2.3
Country Liberal	John Taylor	686	25.3	−16.0
Greens	Debra Beattie-Burnett	453	16.7	+16.7
NT Nationals	Graeme Bevis	442	16.3	−7.9
Independent	Robyne Burridge	133	4.9	+4.9
Total formal votes		2,714	96.7	+0.5
Informal votes		122	4.3	−0.5
Turnout		2,836	82.1	−5.9
Two-party-preferred result
Labor	John Bailey	1,575	58.0	+17.4
Country Liberal	John Taylor	1,139	42.0	−17.4
Labor gain from Country Liberal		Swing	+17.4	
