= Electoral division of Wanguri =

Coordinates: 12°22′21″S 130°53′16″E

Wanguri Northern Territory—Legislative Assembly
- Interactive map of boundaries as of the 2024 election
- Territory: Northern Territory
- Created: 1983
- MP: Oly Carlson
- Party: Country Liberal
- Namesake: Wanguri
- Electors: 5,651 (2026)
- Area: 29 km^{2} (11.2 sq mi)
- Demographic: Urban
Electorates around Wanguri:
Timor Sea	Timor Sea	Timor Sea
Casuarina	Wanguri	Nelson
Karama	Nelson	Nelson

Wanguri is an electoral division of the Legislative Assembly in Australia's Northern Territory. It was first created in 1983. Wanguri is an urban electorate, covering 29 km^{2}, and taking in the north Darwin suburbs of Wanguri, Karama and Leanyer. There were 5,651 people enrolled within the electorate as of July 2026.

Like most electorates in the Territory, Wanguri has a tendency to keep its incumbent members regardless of party. While the Country Liberal Party held it for six years after its creation in 1983, the Labor Party have held it since a 1989 by-election, and it is now reckoned as reasonably safe for that party. Paul Henderson was not expected to have much difficulty retaining Wanguri at the 2005 election, and ultimately held the seat with a strong swing in his favour.

When Henderson resigned in 2013, following his government's defeat in the 2012 election, the resulting by-election saw Nicole Manison hold the seat for Labor. Manison managed to pick up a 12.4 percent swing—according to ABC election analyst Antony Green, the largest against a first term government in Australia in over twenty years. It was enough to revert Wanguri to its traditional status as a comfortably safe Labor seat. Manison consolidated her hold on the seat in the 2016 election, increasing her majority to 19.6 percent. As a result, Wanguri is the third-safest in the Territory and the second-safest seat in the Darwin area.

== Members for Wanguri ==
Member	Party	Term
Don Dale	Country Liberal	1983–1989
John Bailey	Labor	1989–1999
Paul Henderson	Labor	1999–2013
Nicole Manison	Labor	2013–2024
Oly Carlson	Country Liberal	2024–present

== Election results ==
2024 Northern Territory general election: Wanguri
Party	Candidate	Votes	%	±%
Country Liberal	Oly Carlson	2,069	47.7	+22.8
Labor	Shlok Sharma	1,139	26.2	−36.6
Independent	Graeme Sawyer	769	17.7	+17.7
Greens	Andrew Coates	364	8.4	+8.4
Total formal votes		4,341	96.5	−0.8
Informal votes		158	3.5	+0.8
Turnout		4,499	80.0	
Two-party-preferred result
Country Liberal	Oly Carlson	2,561	59.0	+26.3
Labor	Shlok Sharma	1,780	41.0	−26.3
Country Liberal gain from Labor		Swing	+26.3	
