= Larisa Lee =

Australian politician

Member of the Northern Territory Legislative Assembly for Arnhem
- In office 25 August 2012 – 27 August 2016
- Preceded by: Malarndirri McCarthy
- Succeeded by: Selena Uibo

Personal details
- Born: Katherine, Northern Territory, Australia
- Party: Independent (2014–present)
- Other political affiliations: Country Liberal (2012–2014); Palmer United (2014)
- Occupation: Health worker

Larisa Antonia Lillian Lee is an Australian politician. She was elected to the Northern Territory Legislative Assembly as the Country Liberal member for Arnhem at the 2012 territory election. She left the CLP on 4 April 2014, sat as independent until 27 April, when she joined the Palmer United Party, resigned from that party on 29 November, and sat as an independent until her defeat at the 2016 election.

== Early life ==
Lee was born in Katherine, approximately 320 kilometres (200 mi) south-east of Darwin, the Northern Territory's capital, and was raised in the Barunga community. She is the daughter of Jawoyn leader (Bangardi) Robert Lee.

== Parliament ==
Northern Territory Legislative Assembly
Years	Term	Electoral division	Party
2012–2014	12th	Arnhem	Country Liberal
2014	Changed allegiance to:		Independent
2014	Changed allegiance to:		Palmer United
2014–2016	Changed allegiance to:		Independent

Several months after her election, Lee was accused by staff members of the Jawoyn Association Aboriginal Corporation (JAAC) of misusing the corporation's emergency fund—put aside to assist Aboriginal people living in poverty—to pay for her election campaign expenses. On 4 February 2013, Lee submitted an amended Candidate Election Return to the Northern Territory Electoral Commission, declaring an additional $23,000 in donations, including $16,000 from the JAAC, in addition to the single $500 donation on her original declaration. She denied the staff members' accusations, saying that the corporation had donated money to her campaign with the full support of the board.

As of July 2013, Lee was under investigation for alleged misuse of her Government provided Fuel Card. On 14 October 2013, the ABC TV program Four Corners broadcast an investigative story concerning the alleged use of money from the Jawoyn Association, including Lee's use for her election campaign. On 25 April 2014, Lee was charged with aggravated assault and "disorderly behaviour in a public place" following an altercation with an 18-year-old woman outside a Centrelink in Katherine. The maximum sentence for the former charge is five years; she would have automatically lost her seat had she been sentenced to any term longer than one year. On 24 June, Lee pleaded guilty to the charge of common assault on the woman—her niece—for having an affair with her husband.

On 5 April 2014, Lee and two other Indigenous MPs, Alison Anderson and Francis Xavier Kurrupuwu, resigned from the CLP, slipping their resignation letters under the door of the CLP office in Darwin. According to The Australian, they were laying the groundwork for a new party to speak for regional interests, but later that month, on 27 April 2014, the three MPs joined Palmer United, with Anderson becoming parliamentary leader. This lasted only until November, when Lee and Anderson became independents once again.

Lee was defeated by Labor's Selena Uibo in Arnhem at the 2016 election. She received only 117 votes, or 4.0 percent, finishing in fifth and last place.

Northern Territory Legislative Assembly
Preceded by Malarndirri McCarthy	Member for Arnhem; 2012–2016	Succeeded by Selena Uibo
