= Wes Lanhupuy =

Australian politician

Wesley Wagner Lanhupuy (1 November 1952 – 26 October 1995) was an Australian politician. He was the Labor member for Arnhem in the Northern Territory Legislative Assembly from 1983 until his resignation in 1995. He died shortly after the by-election that was triggered by his resignation.

Northern Territory Legislative Assembly
| Years | Term | Electoral division | Party |
|---|---|---|---|
| 1983–1987 | 4th | Arnhem | Labor |
| 1987–1990 | 5th | Arnhem | Labor |
| 1990–1994 | 6th | Arnhem | Labor |
| 1994–1995 | 7th | Arnhem | Labor |

Lanhupuy was the director of the Northern Land Council prior to entering politics. In 1983, Labor leader and Arnhem MLA Bob Collins nominated in the new seat of Arafura, allowing Lanhupuy to contest Arnhem at that year's election. He was narrowly defeated for preselection on the local ballot amidst a party factional conflict, but subsequently selected as the Labor candidate after the unanimous intervention of the federal executive of the Labor Party.

== Namesake ==
Wesley was named after his grandfather Lanhupuy 1, a senior statesman of the Wangurri mala.

== Schooling ==
Laynupuy attended Milingimbi School and Kormilda College in Darwin. He was a champion sportsman, captain of Pumarali (Lightning) House at Kormilda, sportsman of the year in 1971 when he was Darwin High School and Interschool High Jump Champion. At Kormilda Wesley was also assistant Scout master, and a member of the C Men's Basketball and A and B Grade Australian Rules teams.

== Family ==
Laynhupuy considered David Burrumarra to be his adoptive father.

He married S.D. Gurruwiwi, whom he met at Kormilda College. She worked with him in parliament and was a translator and writer for him. They had three children together, Gabby, Lisa and Wesley.

Laynhupuy's oldest son Gary Dhurrkay was an Australian Rules football player.

Northern Territory Legislative Assembly
| Preceded by Bob Collins | Member for Arnhem; 1983–1995 | Succeeded by Jack Ah Kit |
