= Don Dale =

Australian politician

Donald Francis Dale (8 December 1944 – 13 February 1990) was an Australian politician. He was the Country Liberal Party member for Wanguri in the Northern Territory Legislative Assembly from 1983 to 1989, when he resigned due to ill health.

Northern Territory Legislative Assembly
Years	Term	Electoral division	Party
1983–1987	4th	Wanguri	Country Liberal
1987–1989	5th	Wanguri	Country Liberal

He was a minister in the Tuxworth and Hatton governments, serving variously as Minister for Community Development (1986–1987), Minister for Correctional Services (1986–1987), Minister for Youth, Sport, Recreation and Ethnic Affairs (1986–1987) and Minister for Health and Community Services (1987–1989).

Northern Territory Legislative Assembly
Preceded by New seat	Member for Wanguri; 1983–1989	Succeeded by John Bailey
