= John Bailey (Australian politician) =

Australian politician

Northern Territory Legislative Assembly
Years	Term	Electoral division	Party
1989–1990	5th	Wanguri	Labor
1990–1994	6th	Wanguri	Labor
1994–1997	7th	Wanguri	Labor
1997–1999	8th	Wanguri	Labor

John Derek Bailey (born 10 August 1954) is a former Australian politician. He was the Labor member for Wanguri in the Northern Territory Legislative Assembly from 1989 to 1999. Bailey was Deputy Opposition Leader to Maggie Hickey, but was succeeded by Syd Stirling when Clare Martin became Labor leader. He resigned shortly afterwards, in 1999.

Northern Territory Legislative Assembly
Preceded by Don Dale	Member for Wanguri; 1989–1999	Succeeded by Paul Henderson
