= 2013 Wanguri by-election =

Northern Territory by-election

- 16 February 2013
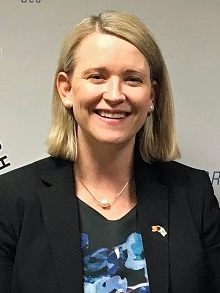

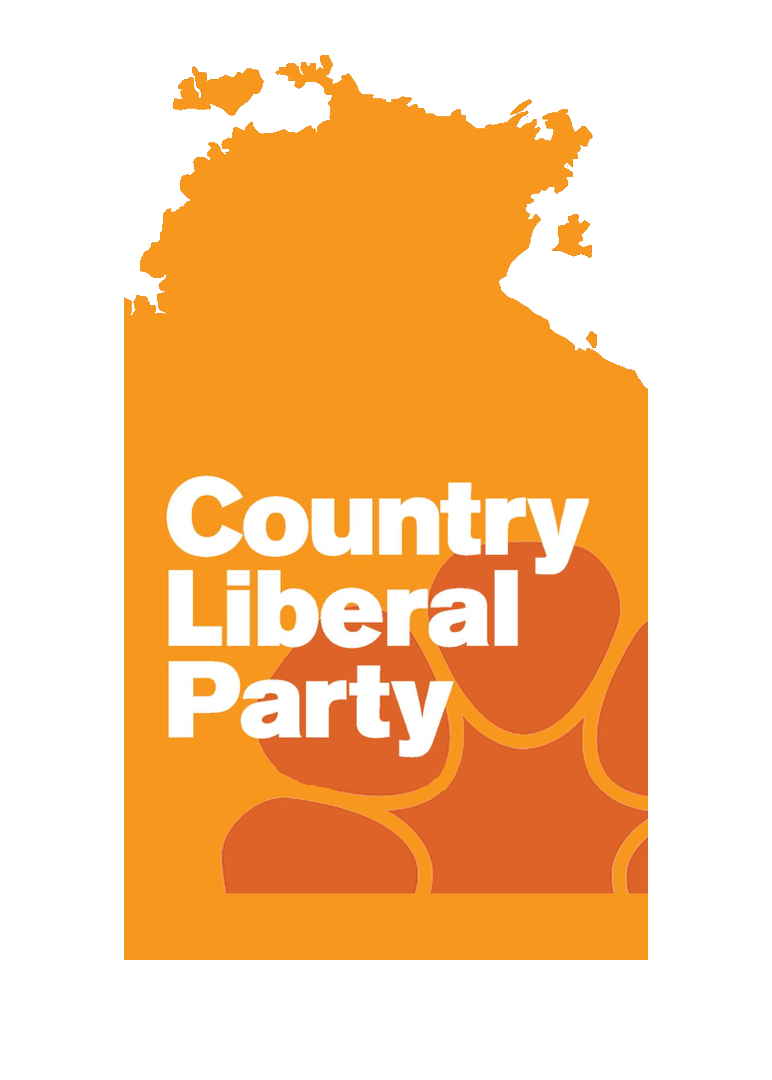
	First party	Second party
Candidate	Nicole Manison	Rhianna Harker
Party	Labor	Country Liberal
Popular vote	2,428	1,059
Percentage	65.2%	28.4%
Swing	▲8.2pp	▼14.6pp
TPP	69.5%	30.6%
TPP swing	▲12.4pp	▼12.4pp
MP before election
Paul Henderson
Labor
Elected MP
Nicole Manison
Labor

A by-election for the seat of Wanguri in the Northern Territory Legislative Assembly was held on 16 February 2013. The by-election was triggered by the resignation of Labor Party (ALP) member and former Chief Minister of the Northern Territory Paul Henderson on 25 January 2013, following the defeat of Henderson's government at the 2012 territory election.

== Candidates ==
Nominations for the by-election closed on 1 February 2013. Rhianna Harker, who contested Wanguri at the 2012 general election, was endorsed by the Country Liberal Party as its candidate. The Australian Labor Party candidate was Nicole Manison. Peter Rudge contested the by-election as an independent candidate—he had previously stood as a candidate for Nightcliff in the 2012 election.

== Results ==
Wanguri by-election, 2013
Party	Candidate	Votes	%	±%
Labor	Nicole Manison	2,428	65.2	+8.2
Country Liberal	Rhianna Harker	1,059	28.4	−14.6
Independent	Peter Rudge	237	6.4	+6.4
Total formal votes		3,724	96.4	–1.7
Informal votes		141	3.6	+1.7
Turnout		3,865	77.5	−11.6
Two-party-preferred result
Labor	Nicole Manison	2,585	69.4	+12.4
Country Liberal	Rhianna Harker	1,139	30.6	−12.4
Labor hold		Swing	+12.4	
