= Members of the Northern Territory Legislative Council, 1960–1962 =

This is a list of members of the Northern Territory Legislative Council from 20 February 1960 to 8 December 1962.

The mass resignations from the Council in April 1958 forced the government's hand, and all council members attended a July 1958 reform conference in Canberra at the invitation of Paul Hasluck, the federal Minister for Territories. The conference resulted in a number of reforms which were legislated in the Northern Territory (Administration) Amendment Act 1959.

The reforms led to the first re-structure of the Council since its inception. The number of members of the council was increased from 14 to 17. Eight members were elected to eight single-member electorates: Alice Springs, Arnhem, Barkly, Elsey, Fannie Bay, Larrakeyah, Port Darwin and Stuart. The remaining members were appointed by the Administrator, but with a distinction between Official Members and Non-official Members. Non-official members were not to be government officers as the official members were. The Administrator retained his regular and casting vote, but it was possible for the elected members voting as a bloc to obtain a majority by gaining the support of one or more non-official members.

The 1962 election saw the first woman member of the Legislative Council, Lyn Berlowitz, an independent member for Fannie Bay.

Name	Party	Electorate/Title	Years in office
Colin Adams	Appointed	Director of Mines	1955–1970
James Archer OBE	Appointed	Administrator	1956–1961
Hugh Barclay	Appointed	Director of Lands	1948–1963
Lyn Berlowitz	Independent	Fannie Bay	1960–1962
Harold Brennan^{[3]}	Independent	Elsey	1955, 1956–1958, 1958–1971
Bill Curteis	Appointed	Director of Agriculture	1962–1964
Fred Drysdale	Labor	Arnhem	1954–1957, 1960–1969
Joe Fisher	Appointed (N)^{[1]}		1961–1968, 1969–1974
Harry Giese	Appointed	Director of Welfare	1954–1973
Neil Hargrave	Independent	Alice Springs	1954–1958, 1958–1962
Bernie Kilgariff	Appointed (N)^{[1]}		1960–1968, 1969–1974
Reg Marsh	Appointed	Assistant Secretary, Department of Territories	1955–1957, 1958–1962
Duncan Mathieson	Appointed (N)^{[1]}		1960–1963
Roger Nott	Appointed	Administrator	1961–1964
Wilhelm Petrick	Independent	Stuart	1951–1958, 1958–1962
Len Purkiss	Independent	Tennant Creek	1951–1966
Lucius Richardson^{[2]}	Independent Labor	Larrakeyah	1960
Lionel Rose OBE	Appointed	Director of Animal Industry Branch	1954–1958, 1962–1965
John Tonkin	Appointed (N)^{[1]}		1960–1961
Richard Ward	Independent Labor	Darwin	1957–1958, 1958–1963
James Watts^{[2]}	Labor	Larrakeyah	1961–1962
James Whittam	Appointed	Director of Animal Industry Branch	1958–1963
Ron Withnall	Appointed	Crown Law Officer	1954–1966

^{1} "Appointed (N)" indicates the councillor was a Non-official Member appointed by the Territory Administrator, but generally from a community or business background, not a government official or public servant.
^{2} Lucius Richardson resigned from the Council on 1 December 1960. Labor member James Watts replaced him in a by-election held on 28 January 1961.
^{3} Harold Brennan resigned as member for Elsey on 9 December 1961, to contest the federal Division of Northern Territory at the federal election on the same day. He was unsuccessful in unseating Jock Nelson, and nominated at the by-election to fill the vacancy. Brennan was re-elected on 17 February 1962.

== See also ==
- 1960 Northern Territory general election
