= Members of the Northern Territory Legislative Council, 1965–1968 =

This is a list of members of the Northern Territory Legislative Council from 30 October 1965 to 26 October 1968.

The 1965 election was the genesis of a party system in the Northern Territory, with the majority of candidates being nominated by political parties, and where NT Labor faced a party team for the first time, with the new North Australia Party nominating five candidates, although the party dissolved shortly after this election.

An administrative change in 1965 saw the president of the council no longer being the Administrator of the Northern Territory, with the council electing its own president, Harry Chan, in December 1965.

Name	Party	Electorate/Title	Years in office
Colin Adams	Appointed	Director of Mines	1955–1970
Alan Atkins	Appointed	Assistant Administrator	1963–1967
Harold Brennan	Independent	Elsey	1955, 1956–1958, 1958–1971
Harry Chan	Independent	Fannie Bay	1962–1969
Tony Chisholm	Appointed (N)^{[1]}		1967–1968
Edward Connellan	Appointed (N)^{[1]}		1965–1967
Fred Drysdale	Labor	Nightcliff	1954–1957, 1960–1969
Eric Francis Dwyer	Appointed	Assistant Administrator	1964–1968
Joe Fisher	Appointed (N)^{[1]}		1961–1968, 1969–1974
Harry Giese	Appointed	Director of Welfare	1954–1973
Tony Greatorex	North Australia Party	Stuart	1965–1974
Bernie Kilgariff	Appointed (N)^{[1]}		1960–1968, 1969–1974
Goff Letts	Appointed	Lands and Primary Industry Officer	1967–1971, 1971–1974
John Lyons	Independent	Port Darwin	1963–1968
Eric Marks^{[2]}	Labor	Barkly	1966–1974
Peter Murray^{[3]}	Labor	Arnhem	1963–1966
Charles Orr	Labor	Alice Springs	1965–1971
Henry Plant	Appointed		1967–1974
Len Purkiss^{[2]}	Independent	Barkly	1951–1965
Tony Richardson	Appointed		1963–1967
Lionel Rose OBE	Independent	Alice Springs	1954–1958, 1962–1965
James Williams	Appointed	Crown Law Officer	1966–1971
Ron Withnall^{[3]}	Appointed/Independent	Crown Law Officer/Arnhem	1954–1966, 1966–1974

^{1} "Appointed (N)" indicates the councillor was a Non-official Member appointed by the Territory Administrator, but generally from a community or business background, not a government official or public servant.
^{2} The independent member for Barkly, Len Purkiss, died from silicosis on 24 November 1965. Eric Marks (Labor) was elected to replace him in a by-election on 5 February 1966.
^{3} Labor member Peter Murray resigned as member for Arnhem in 1966. Ron Withnall, formerly an appointed Official Member, was elected to replace him in a by-election on 26 November 1966.

== See also ==
- 1965 Northern Territory Legislative Council election
