= Members of the Northern Territory Legislative Council, 1957–1960 =

This is a list of members of the Northern Territory Legislative Council from 23 January 1957 to 20 February 1960.

The council consisted of 14 members. Five members were elected to four single-member electorates (Alice Springs, Batchelor, Stuart and Tennant Creek), and one two-member electorate (Darwin). Seven members (called Official Members) were appointed by the Australian government, all of whom were senior public servants in the Northern Territory. The Administrator of the Northern Territory, James Archer, served as presiding officer (or president) of the council.

The 1957 election had stressed the need for reform of the council, with virtually unanimous support in the council for elected members to constitute a majority. In 1958, a year after the first meeting of the council, every elected member resigned in frustration with the refusal of the federal government to announce such a reform. The resignations triggered by-elections on 28 June for all seats — in effect, although not in application of the Northern Territory (Administration) Act 1947, another general election. All previous members were elected unopposed, except for Len Purkiss, who was re-elected with an increased majority in Tennant Creek.

Name	Party	Electorate/Title	Years in office
Colin Adams	Appointed	Director of Mines	1955–1970
James Archer OBE	Appointed	Administrator	1956–1961
Hugh Barclay	Appointed	Director of Lands	1948–1963
Harold Brennan	Independent	Batchelor	1955, 1956–1958, 1958–1971
Paddy Carroll	Labor	Darwin	1957–1958, 1958–1960
Harry Giese	Appointed	Director of Welfare	1954–1973
Neil Hargrave	Independent	Alice Springs	1954–1958, 1958–1969
Alfred Humphry	Appointed	Director of Health	1954–1958
Alexander Lawrie	Appointed	Assistant Administrator	1957–1958
Reg Marsh	Appointed	Assistant Secretary, Department of Territories	1955–1957, 1958–1962
Wilhelm Petrick	Independent	Stuart	1951–1958, 1958–1962
Len Purkiss	Independent	Tennant Creek	1951–1965
Claude Reseigh	Appointed		1959
Lionel Rose OBE	Appointed	Director of Animal Industry Branch	1954–1958, 1962–1965
Charles Stahl	Appointed	Acting Government Secretary	1952–1953, 1954–1955, 1958
Richard Ward	Independent Labor	Darwin	1957–1958, 1958–1963
Ronald Webb	Appointed	Chief Quarantine Officer	1958–1960
James Whittam	Appointed	Director of Animal Industry Branch	1958–1963

== See also ==
- 1957 Northern Territory general election
- 1958 Northern Territory by-elections
