= Members of the Northern Territory Legislative Council, 1962–1965 =

This is a list of members of the Northern Territory Legislative Council from 8 December 1962 to 30 October 1965.

Name	Party	Electorate/Title	Years in office
Colin Adams	Appointed	Director of Mines	1955–1970
Alan Atkins	Appointed	Assistant Administrator	1963–1967
Hugh Barclay	Appointed	Director of Lands	1948–1963
Harold Brennan	Independent	Elsey	1955, 1956–1958, 1958–1971
Harry Chan	Independent	Fannie Bay	1962–1969
Bill Curteis	Appointed	Director of Agriculture	1962–1964
Fred Drysdale	Labor	Nightcliff	1954–1957, 1960–1969
Eric Francis Dwyer	Appointed	Assistant Administrator	1964–1968
Joe Fisher	Appointed (N)^{[1]}		1961–1968, 1969–1974
Harry Giese	Appointed	Director of Welfare	1954–1973
Bernie Kilgariff	Appointed (N)^{[1]}		1960–1968, 1969–1974
John Lyons^{[2]}	Independent	Port Darwin	1963–1968
Duncan Mathieson	Appointed (N)^{[1]}		1960–1963
Peter Murray	Appointed (N)^{[1]}		1963–1966
Roger Nott	Appointed	Administrator	1961–1964
Len Purkiss	Independent	Tennant Creek	1951–1965
Lionel Rose OBE	Independent	Alice Springs	1954–1958, 1962–1965
David Smith	Labor	Stuart	1962–1965
Richard Ward^{[2]}	Independent Labor	Port Darwin	1947–1949, 1957–1958, 1958–1963, 1968–1974
Ken Waters	Independent	Arnhem	1962–1965 (Note: Kenneth Colin Waters (died c. August 1976) was initially a schoolteacher, then a businessman, and also served on Darwin City Council as well as many other community organisations. He was an Alderman on the Darwin City Council from 1963 until 1973, and Lord Mayor of Darwin from 1971 to 1972.)
James Whittam	Appointed	Director of Animal Industry Branch	1958–1963
Ron Withnall	Appointed	Crown Law Officer	1954–1966

^{1} "Appointed (N)" indicates the councillor was a Non-official Member appointed by the Territory Administrator, but generally from a community or business background, not a government official or public servant.
^{2} Richard Ward resigned as member for Port Darwin on 14 June 1963. John Lyons was elected to replace him in a by-election on 13 July 1963.
