= Members of the Northern Territory Legislative Council, 1968–1971 =

This is a list of members of the Northern Territory Legislative Council from 26 October 1968 to 23 October 1971.

Name	Party	Electorate/Title	Years in office
Colin Adams	Appointed	Director of Mines	1955–1970
Thomas Bell	Independent	McMillan	1968–1974
Harold Brennan	Independent	Victoria River	1955, 1956–1958, 1958–1971
Harry Chan^{[1]}	Independent	Fannie Bay	1962–1969
Norman Cooper^{[2]}	Independent	Nightcliff	1970–1971
Fred Drysdale^{[2]}	Labor	Nightcliff	1954–1957, 1960–1969
Joe Fisher^{[1]}	Independent	Fannie Bay	1961–1968, 1969–1974
Harry Giese	Appointed	Director of Welfare	1954–1973
Tony Greatorex	Country	Stuart	1965–1974
Barry Hart	Appointed	Assistant Director of Primary Industries	1970–1973
Rupert Kentish	Country	Arnhem	1968–1974
Bernie Kilgariff	Country	Alice Springs	1960–1968, 1969–1974
John Macfarlane	Country	Elsey	1968–1974
Eric Marks	Labor	Barkly	1966–1974
Clem O'Sullivan	Appointed	Crown Law Officer	1971–1974
Charles Orr	Labor	Alice Springs	1965–1971
Henry Plant	Appointed		1967–1974
Phil Purich	Appointed	Director of Mines	1970–1973
Tony Richardson	Appointed		1963–1967
Richard Ward	Labor	Ludmilla	1947–1949, 1957–1958, 1958–1963, 1968–1974
James Williams	Appointed	Crown Law Officer	1966–1971
Ron Withnall	Independent	Port Darwin	1954–1966, 1966–1974

^{1} The independent member for Fannie Bay and President of the Legislative Council, Harry Chan, died on 5 August 1969. Joe Fisher, a mining consultant and former appointed non-official member, was elected to replace him at a by-election on 20 September 1969.
^{2} The Labor member for Nightcliff, Fred Drysdale, died on 15 December 1969. Independent member Norman Cooper was elected to replace him at a by-election on 31 January 1970.
^{3} The independent member for Victoria River, Harold Brennan, resigned from the council for the third time on 10 December 1969, in this instance to contest the federal Division of Northern Territory at the 1969 Australian federal election. He was unsuccessful, and was re-elected at the by-election on 20 December 1969.

== See also ==
- 1968 Northern Territory Legislative Council election
