= Members of the Northern Territory Legislative Council, 1954–1957 =

This is a list of members of the Northern Territory Legislative Council from 29 May 1954 to 23 January 1957.

The council consisted of 14 members. Six members were elected to four single-member electorates (Alice Springs, Batchelor, Stuart and Tennant Creek), and one two-member electorate (Darwin). Seven members (called Official Members) were appointed by the Australian government, all of whom were senior public servants in the Northern Territory. The Administrator of the Northern Territory, Frank Wise and later James Archer, served as presiding officer (or president) of the council.

Name	Party	Electorate/Title	Years in office
Colin Adams	Appointed	Director of Mines	1955–1970
James Archer OBE	Appointed	Administrator	1956–1961
Hugh Barclay	Appointed	Director of Lands	1948–1963
Harold Brennan ^{[1]}	Independent	Batchelor	1955, 1956–1971
Aubrey Callinan	Independent	Darwin	1954–1957
Fred Drysdale	Independent Labor	Darwin	1954–1957, 1960–1969
Keith Edmunds	Appointed	Crown Law Officer	1951–1954
Harry Giese	Appointed	Director of Welfare	1954–1973
Neil Hargrave	Independent	Alice Springs	1954–1969
Alfred Humphry	Appointed	Director of Health	1954–1958
John Huthnance	Appointed	Chief Clerk	1949–1955
Reg Leydin	Appointed	Government Secretary	1948–1952, 1953–1954, 1963
Reg Marsh	Appointed	Assistant Secretary, Department of Territories	1955–1957, 1958–1962
Reginald McCaffery	Appointed	Acting Director of Native Affairs	1953–1954
Wilhelm Petrick	Independent	Stuart	1951–1962
Len Purkiss	Independent	Tennant Creek	1951–1965
Tom Ronan ^{[1]}	Labor	Batchelor	1954–1955
Lionel Rose OBE	Appointed	Director of Animal Industry	1954–1958, 1962–1965
Charles Stahl	Appointed	Acting Government Secretary	1952–1953, 1954–1955,
Frank Vidgen	Appointed	Director of Works	1951–1954
Dr Stephen Watsford	Appointed	Chief Medical Officer	1951–1954
Frank Wise	Appointed	Administrator	1951–1956
Ron Withnall	Appointed	Crown Law Officer	1954–1966, 1966–1974

^{1} The Labor member for Batchelor, Tom Ronan, resigned on 5 April 1955, unhappy with the conditions for members of the council. The Administrator, Frank Wise, called the Territory's first by-election (previous casual vacancies had been filled by appointment or left vacant until the next general election) for 6 August. Harold "Tiger" Brennan, who Ronan had defeated by only three votes at the 1954 election, won the by-election with a comfortable majority against the Labor candidate Alfred Forscutt. On 5 December 1955, Brennan resigned from the council in a public protest over the federal government ordering its official members to vote against a bill legalising off-course gambling. Another by-election was called for Batchelor, and Brennan returned to the council when he was unopposed at the close of nominations on 13 February 1956.

== See also ==
- 1954 Northern Territory general election
