= Members of the Northern Territory Legislative Council, 1947–1949 =

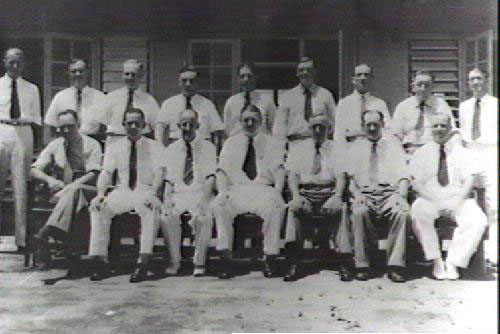
The first Legislative Council of the Northern Territory, meeting at the Supreme Court building in Darwin on 16 February 1948. Seated, left-to-right: Jock Nelson (Stuart), Dr John McGlashan (Chief Medical Officer), William Flynn (Acting Deputy Crown Solicitor) Arthur Driver (President), Matthew Luke (Darwin) Robert Coxon (Director of Mines), Frank Hopkins (Darwin); standing, left-to-right: A. Turner (Acting Clerk), Reg Leydin (Government Secretary), Leonard Lucas (Director of Works), Victor Webster (Tennant Creek), Francis Moy (Director of Native Affairs), Richard Ward (Alice Springs), Hugh Barclay (Director of Lands), William Fulton (Batchelor), D.R.M. Thompson (Clerk).

This is a list of members of the Northern Territory Legislative Council from 13 December 1947 to 10 December 1949.

The council consisted of 14 members. Six members were elected to four single-member electorates (Alice Springs, Batchelor, Stuart and Tennant Creek), and one two-member electorate (Darwin). Seven members (called Official Members) were appointed by the Australian government, all of whom were department heads in the public service of the Northern Territory. The Administrator of the Northern Territory, Arthur Driver, served as presiding officer (or president) of the council.

Name	Party	Electorate/Title	Years in office
Hugh Barclay	Appointed	Director of Lands	1948–1963
Robert Coxon	Appointed	Director of Mining	1948–1954
Les Dodd ^{[2]}	Appointed	Director of Education	1949–1951
Arthur Driver	Appointed	Administrator	1947–1951
William Flynn	Appointed	Deputy Crown Solicitor	1948–1951
William Fulton ^{[3]}	Labor (NAWU)	Batchelor	1948–1949
Dr Edward Gunson ^{[1]}^{[2]}	Appointed	Chief Medical Officer	1949
Frank Hopkins ^{[2]}	Independent	Darwin	1947–1949
John Huthnance	Appointed	Chief Clerk	1949–1955
Eric Izod ^{[2]}	Independent	Darwin	1949, 1951–1954
Dr William Kirkland ^{[1]}	Appointed	Acting Chief Medical Officer	1949
Reg Leydin	Appointed	Government Secretary	1948–1952, 1953–1954, 1963
Leonard Lucas ^{[2]}	Appointed	Director of Works	1948
Matthew Luke	Independent Labor	Darwin	1947–1954
Dr John McGlashan ^{[1]}	Appointed	Chief Medical Officer	1948–1949
Francis Moy	Appointed	Director of Native Affairs	1948–1953
Jock Nelson	Labor (NAWU)	Stuart	1947–1949
Richard Ward	Labor (NAWU)	Alice Springs	1947–1949, 1957–1974
Victor Webster	Independent	Tennant Creek	1947–1950

^{1} Chief Medical Officer Dr John McGlashan was transferred to the role of Quarantine Officer in Perth, Western Australia in January 1949. His place on the council was filled by acting CMO Dr William Kirkland, until Dr Edward Gunson was officially appointed as McGlashan's replacement in February.
^{2} On 18 August 1949, the Governor-General appointed Les Dodd (Director of Education) and John Huthnance (Chief Clerk) to the vacancies caused by the resignation of appointed members Leonard Lucas and Edward Gunson. On the same day, Darwin businessman Eric Izod was appointed to replace elected member Frank Hopkins.
^{3} The member for Batchelor, William Fulton, resigned on 23 August 1949. The vacancy was not filled until the next election in December.

== See also ==
- 1947 Northern Territory general election
