= Members of the Northern Territory Legislative Council, 1949–1951 =

This is a list of members of the Northern Territory Legislative Council from 10 December 1949 to 28 April 1951.

The council consisted of 14 members. Six members were elected to four single-member electorates (Alice Springs, Batchelor, Stuart and Tennant Creek), and one two-member electorate (Darwin). Seven members (called Official Members) were appointed by the Australian government, all of whom were senior public servants in the Northern Territory. The Administrator of the Northern Territory, Arthur Driver, served as presiding officer (or president) of the council.

The Commonwealth Act establishing the Legislative Council contained a provision that elections for the non-appointed seats would occur on the same day as federal elections for the House of Representatives. In 1951, the Menzies government called an early federal election for 28 April. On 23 March, the acting Administrator stated that there was doubt over this interpretation of the Act, and that the Administrator had decided not to hold a council election that year, which would result in the council term continuing until the next federal election in 1954—however, this five-year term would be a breach of the Act which specified a three-year term length. Additionally, the federal electoral office in Canberra issued a telegram which stated that it was 'expected' that an election would be held to coincide with the federal one. On 29 March, the Administrator announced that an election would be held on 28 April.

Name	Party	Electorate/Title	Years in office
Frederick Austin	Independent	Darwin	1949–1951
Hugh Barclay	Appointed	Director of Lands	1948–1963
William Braitling	Independent	Stuart	1949–1951
Robert Coxon	Appointed	Director of Mining	1948–1954
Les Dodd ^{[2]}	Appointed	Director of Education	1949–1951
Frederick Dowling	Labor	Batchelor	1949–1954
Arthur Driver	Appointed	Administrator	1947–1951
William Flynn	Appointed	Deputy Crown Solicitor	1948–1951
John Higgins ^{[1]}	Independent	Tennant Creek	1950–1951
John Huthnance	Appointed	Chief Clerk	1949–1955
Frank Johnson	Labor	Alice Springs	1949–1954
Robert Jones MBE	Appointed	Apprentice Board Member	1950–1951
Reg Leydin	Appointed	Government Secretary	1948–1952, 1953–1954, 1963
Matthew Luke	Independent Labor	Darwin	1947–1954
Francis Moy	Appointed	Director of Native Affairs	1948–1953
Dr Stephen Watsford ^{[2]}	Appointed	Chief Medical Officer	1951–1954
Victor Webster ^{[1]}	Independent	Tennant Creek	1947–1950

^{1} Victor Webster, the elected member for Tennant Creek, resigned from the council on 17 May 1950 (before the first meeting of the term) after losing his job as a medical officer with the federal Department of Health when the Chifley government was defeated at the 1949 federal election, and having to leave the Territory. On 16 November 1950, Administrator Arthur Driver appointed John Higgins as his replacement, ignoring Charles Priest who had contested the seat against Webster at the 1949 election.
^{2} Appointed member Les Dodd resigned on 15 March 1951. His place on the council was filled by Chief Medical Officer Dr Stephen Watsford.

== See also ==
- 1949 Northern Territory general election
