= Members of the Northern Territory Legislative Council, 1971–1974 =

This is a list of members of the Northern Territory Legislative Council from 23 October 1971 until its abolition on 19 October 1974.

Name	Party	Electorate/Title	Years in office
Hedley Beare	Appointed	Director of Education	1973–1974
Thomas Bell	Independent	McMillan	1968–1974
Norman Cooper	Independent	Nightcliff	1970–1971
Joe Fisher	Independent	Fannie Bay	1961–1968, 1969–1974
Harry Giese	Appointed	Director of Welfare	1954–1973
Tony Greatorex	Country	Stuart	1965–1974
Dr Charles Gurd	Appointed	Director of Health	1974
Barry Hart	Appointed	Director of Primary Industries	1970–1973
Rupert Kentish	Country	Arnhem	1968–1974
Bernie Kilgariff	Country	Alice Springs	1960–1968, 1969–1974
Dawn Lawrie	Independent	Nightcliff	1971–1974
Goff Letts	Country	Victoria River	1971–1974
Creed Lovegrove	Appointed	Director of Aboriginal Affairs	1974
John Macfarlane	Country	Elsey	1968–1974
Eric Marks	Labor	Barkly	1966–1974
Ray McHenry	Appointed	Director of Welfare	1973–1974
Clem O'Sullivan	Appointed	Crown Law Officer	1971–1974
Charles Orr	Labor	Alice Springs	1965–1971
Henry Plant	Appointed		1967–1974
Phil Purich	Appointed	Director of Mines	1970–1973
Charles Terrell	Appointed	Director of Health	1973–1974
Dr Des Travers	Appointed	Director of Health	1974
Richard Ward	Labor	Ludmilla	1947–1949, 1957–1958, 1958–1963, 1968–1974
Ron Withnall	Independent	Port Darwin	1954–1966, 1966–1974

== See also ==
- 1971 Northern Territory general election
