= 1968 Northern Territory Legislative Council election =

- 26 October 1968

	First party	Second party	Third party
Party	Labor	Country	Liberal
Last election	3	Did not contest	Did not contest
Seats before	3	1	0
Seats won	4	4	0
Seat change	▲1	▲3	Steady

The 1968 Northern Territory Legislative Council election was held on 26 October 1968 to elect 11 members of the partly elected Northern Territory Legislative Council, the governing body of the Northern Territory of Australia.

Prior to this election, the three non-government nominees were replaced by three further elected members. However, the Commonwealth still held the right of veto.

This was the first election for the council contested by the Country Party and Liberal Party, both predecessors to the territory's Country Liberal Party. Incumbent North Australia Party MLC Tony Greatorex joined the Country Party prior to the election.

The election also saw the council's first Indigenous candidates, with George Winunduj running in Arnhem and Joyce Clague running in Stuart. Winunduj finished 10 votes behind Rupert Kentish (Country) on first preferences, but preferences from third-placed Maurie Balke (Liberal) favoured Kentish.

== Results ==
Party	Seats	+/–
Territory Labor Party	4	+1
Country Party	4	+4
Liberal Party	0	0
Independents	3	–1
Total	11	+3

== Aftermath ==
=== By-elections ===
Harry Chan, the independent member for Fannie Bay and President of the Legislative Council, died on 5 August 1969. Joe Fisher, a mining consultant and former appointed non-official member, was elected to replace him at a by-election on 20 September 1969.

Labor MLC for Nightcliff, Fred Drysdale, died on 15 December 1969. Labor lost the seat at a by-election on 31 January 1970, with independent Norman Cooper elected.

Independent MLC Harold Brennan resigned as member for Victoria River (and from council for the third time) on 10 December 1969, in this instance to contest the federal Division of Northern Territory at the 1969 federal election. He was unsuccessful, and was returned to a council through a by-election on 20 December 1969.
