= Results of the 1947 Northern Territory general election =

This is a list of electoral district results for the 1947 general election for the Northern Territory Legislative Council in Australia.

== Results by electoral district ==
=== Alice Springs ===
1947 Northern Territory general election: Alice Springs
Party	Candidate	Votes	%	±%
Independent Labor	Richard Ward	233	40.4	n/a
Labor	Frank Johnson	207	36.9	n/a
Independent	Olive Donnellan	88	15.3	n/a
Independent	Walter Chalmers	49	8.5	n/a
Total formal votes		577	97.5	n/a
Informal votes		15	2.5	n/a
Turnout		592	80.5	n/a
Two-candidate-preferred result
Independent Labor	Richard Ward	289	50.1	n/a
Labor	Frank Johnson	288	49.1	n/a
Independent win		(new seat)		

=== Batchelor ===
1947 Northern Territory general election: Batchelor
Party	Candidate	Votes	%	±%
Labor	William Fulton	201	44.2	n/a
Independent	Frank Kent	158	34.7	n/a
Independent	James Newman	96	21.1	n/a
Total formal votes		455	99.3	n/a
Informal votes		3	0.7	n/a
Turnout		458	50.1	n/a
Two-candidate-preferred result
Labor	William Fulton	241	53.0	n/a
Independent	Frank Kent	214	47.0	n/a
Labor win		(new seat)		

=== Darwin ===
1947 Northern Territory general election: Darwin
Party	Candidate	Votes	%	±%
Independent	Frank Hopkins	566	40.5	n/a
Independent Labor	Matthew Luke	240	17.2	n/a
Labor	John Meaney	204	14.6	n/a
Independent	Patrick McDonald	160	11.4	n/a
Labor	John Coleman	142	10.2	n/a
Independent	William Seery	160	11.4	n/a
Independent	James Kelly	40	2.9	n/a
Total formal votes		1,398	95.9	n/a
Informal votes		60	4.1	n/a
Turnout		1,458	70.1	n/a
After first distribution of preferences
Independent	Frank Hopkins	930	66.5	n/a
After second distribution of preferences
Independent Labor	Matthew Luke	764	54.6	n/a
Independent win		(new seat)		

=== Stuart ===
1947 Northern Territory general election: Stuart
Party	Candidate	Votes	%	±%
Labor	Jock Nelson	157	62.3	n/a
Independent	John Driver	72	28.6	n/a
Independent	Creed Lovegrove	23	9.1	n/a
Total formal votes		252	99.2	n/a
Informal votes		2	0.8	n/a
Turnout		254	61.5	n/a
Labor win		(new seat)		

=== Tennant Creek ===
1947 Northern Territory general election: Tennant Creek
Party	Candidate	Votes	%	±%
Independent	Victor Webster	149	57.1	n/a
Labor	Owen Rowe	112	42.9	n/a
Total formal votes		261	98.1	n/a
Informal votes		5	1.9	n/a
Turnout		266	88.7	n/a
Independent win		(new seat)		
