= Lyn Berlowitz =

Australian pastoralist, nurse and politician

Linda Marion Berlowitz (30 April 1903 – 1 July 1998) was an Australian pastoralist, nurse and politician. She was the first woman to be a member of the Northern Territory Legislative Council when she was elected as the independent member for Fannie Bay on 20 February 1960.

Berlowitz was born on 30 April 1903 in Boulder, Western Australia. After her schooling, she worked for a stock and station agency before moving to Melbourne to train as a nurse. In 1943, she married Harold "Happy" Berlowitz, and the couple moved to Darwin several years later. In Darwin, Berlowitz was active in community affairs, particularly women's issues, and was encouraged by friends and colleagues to run as an independent candidate at the 1960 election for the Legislative Council. She did so, and was elected as member for the new district of Fannie Bay, serving one term before being defeated by Harry Chan in 1962.

As a member of the council, Berlowitz took a keen interest in Aboriginal affairs. She also introduced a Bill allowing women to be included on juries in the Northern Territory if they applied to be added to a jury roll. The legislation was vociferously opposed by fellow council member and Crown Law Officer Ron Withnall, who said that there would be women jurors "over [his] dead body". In 1964, Berlowitz and another woman were stood aside on a jury panel, and she lamented that while the Crown Counsel continued to stand aside women from juries as a matter of policy, it showed that these discriminatory attitudes were still in place in spite of the legislation.

The Berlowitzes purchased the Bullita Station homestead and cattle station in the Victoria River region, where they lived until 1977.

Berlowitz died in Sydney on 1 July 1998 at age 95.
