= Lord Mayor of Darwin =

- Incumbent; Peter Styles since 2025
- Style: The Right Worshipful the Lord Mayor of Darwin
- Member of: Darwin City Council
- Appointer: Directly elected

The lord mayor of Darwin is the head of the local government for the City of Darwin in the Northern Territory, Australia.

== Mayors (1915–1980) ==
#	Mayor	Term
1	Percy Kelsey	1915–1917
2	Douglas Crombie (Jim) Watts	1917–1919
3	Robert Toupein	1919–1921
4	Jack Field Burton	1921–1922
5	Arthur William Adams	1922–1924
6	John Alfred (Jack) Porter	1925–1927
–	Douglas Crombie (Jim) Watts	1927–1929
7	John Henry (Jack) Brogan	1929–1937
Darwin Town Council ceased functioning between 1937 and 1957 due to bankruptcy caused by cyclone and World War II.
8	Lucius (Bill) Richardson	1957–1958
9	John "Tiger" Lyons	1958–1959 (Note: Subsequently elected to the Northern Territory Legislative Council (1962–1965))
10	(Norman) Harold Cooper	1959–1966
11	Harry Chan	1966–1969
–	Lucius (Bill) Richardson	1969–1971
12	Kenneth Colin Waters	1971–1972
13	Harold "Tiger" Brennan	1972–1975
14	Ella Stack	1975–1979

== Lord mayors (since 1980) ==
#	Lord Mayor	Term
14	Ella Stack	1980
15	Cecil Black	1980–1984
16	Alec Fong Lim	1984–1990
17	Alan Markham	1990–1992
18	George Brown	1992–2002
19	Peter Adamson	2002–2007
20	Garry Lambert	2007–2008
21	Graeme Sawyer	2008–2012
22	Katrina Fong Lim	2012–2017
23	Kon Vatskalis	2017–2025
24	Peter Styles	2025-present
