= Ella Stack =

Australian medical doctor and politician (1929–2023)

Ella Stack CBE
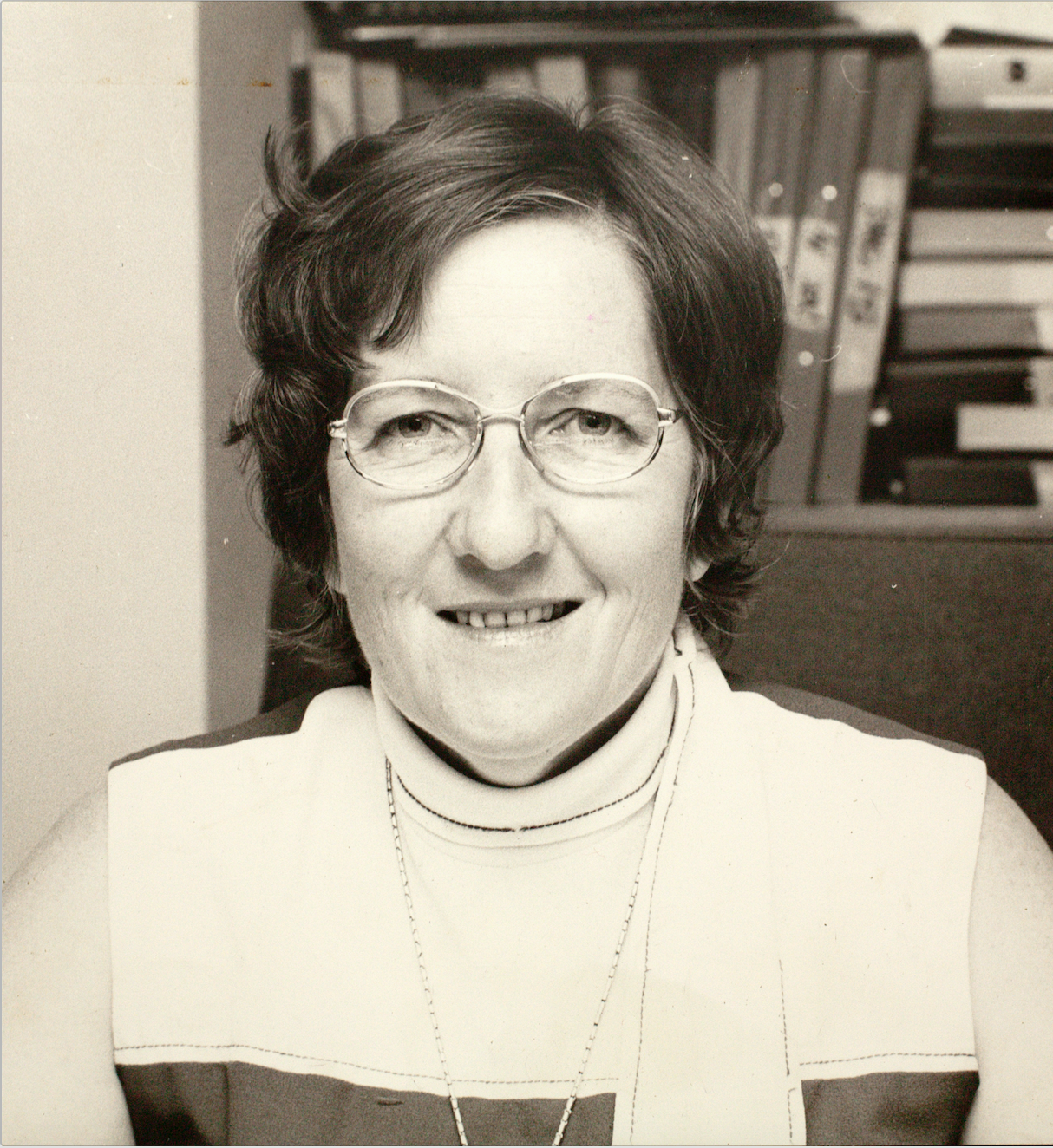
- Stack in 1970

Lord Mayor of Darwin
- In office May 1975 – May 1980
- Preceded by: Harold "Tiger" Brennan
- Succeeded by: Cecil Black

Personal details
- Born: Ellen Mary Stack; 4 May 1929 Sydney, Australia
- Died: 19 May 2023 (aged 94) Canberra, Australia
- Spouse: Thomas Lawler (m. 1957)
- Education: University of Sydney; Sydney Medical School
- Profession: Medical doctor

Ellen Mary Stack CBE (4 May 1929 – 19 May 2023) was an Australian medical doctor and the first female Lord Mayor of an Australian capital city. She was the mayor of the City of Darwin, Northern Territory, from 1975 to 1979, and lord mayor from 1979 to 1980. She is best known for her work following the destruction of Darwin due to Cyclone Tracy.

== Early life ==
Stack was born in Sydney on 4 May 1929, the daughter of William and Elizabeth Stack. She attended Brigidine Convent in Randwick and went on to study piano at the Conservatorium of Music in Sydney.

== Medical career ==
Stack graduated in 1956 with a Bachelor of Medicine, Bachelor of Surgery from the University of Sydney where she was a resident at Sancta Sophia College. She then became a Fellow of the Royal Australian College of General Practitioners and worked in obstetrics and gynecology. She worked in Wee Waa and Narrabri in the Namoi Valley before moving to Darwin in 1961. Working at a clinic in Parap, she was one of only two private practitioners in Darwin at the time.

After her time as Lord Mayor of Darwin, she completed a Masters of Public Health from the University of Sydney. She then returned to Darwin, becoming the first Assistant Secretary of the Division of Aboriginal Health at the Department of Health of the Northern Territory. She became the Chief Medical Officer of the Northern Territory in 1987. Stack was instrumental in the establishment of Menzies School of Health in 1985.

Stack wrote about and commented publicly on public health and community issues such as abortion and women's rights.

== Cyclone Tracy and life in Darwin ==
After moving to Darwin in 1961, Stack became increasingly interested in politics. She was elected to the Darwin City Council in 1969 and became Deputy Mayor in 1974.

Stack and her family survived Cyclone Tracy, despite the destruction of their house. Stack decided not to be evacuated from Darwin, instead running an emergency clinic at Darwin High School, which became the main shelter and evacuation centre after the cyclone. She was responsible for the health care of 11,000 people who passed through the centre. "Not only did I look after the people that came in, but also people came and lived here," she said. "They brought their sodden old mattresses with them... I used to do a ward round every day and call them the sodden mattress lot."

Stack was pivotal in establishing the Darwin Disaster Welfare Council, that would later become the Northern Territory Women's Advisory Council. Stack became involved in reconstruction efforts. She was elected mayor of the City of Darwin in May 1975 and automatically became a member of the Darwin Reconstruction Commission.

Stack was re-elected Mayor of Darwin on 30 April 1978. Stack became the first Lord Mayor of Darwin in 1979 when it became a capital city. She was the first female Lord Mayor of an Australian capital city. Stack was made Commander of the Order of the British Empire in 1979 for services rendered to the people of Darwin following the cyclone.

Stack resigned as Lord Mayor in May 1980 to run for the Country Liberal Party as candidate in the seat of Fannie Bay in the June 1980 Northern Territory election. She lost to the incumbent, Pam O'Neil.

In 1985, Stack served as the Northern Territory representative on the first National Australia Day Council.

In 1989, Stack acted as the chief medical officer of the Northern Territory.

== Personal life and death ==
In 1957, Stack married Thomas Lawler, an agricultural scientist. Together they had three sons.

Stack died in Canberra on 19 May 2023, at age 94.

== Collections and resources ==
The Ella Stack Collection, donated by Stack in 2015, is available through Library & Archives NT. It is a complete collection of her personal papers and research materials from her work in Darwin.

Two oral history recordings have been made of Stack; the first, recorded in 1976, is available through the National Library of Australia and the second, recorded in 1995, through Library & Archives NT.
