= Members of the Northern Territory Legislative Council, 1951–1954 =

This is a list of members of the Northern Territory Legislative Council from 28 April 1951 to 29 May 1954.

The council consisted of 14 members. Six members were elected to four single-member electorates (Alice Springs, Batchelor, Stuart and Tennant Creek), and one two-member electorate (Darwin). Seven members (called Official Members) were appointed by the Australian government, all of whom were senior public servants in the Northern Territory. The Administrator of the Northern Territory, Frank Wise, served as presiding officer (or president) of the council.

| Name | Party | Electorate/Title | Years in office |
|---|---|---|---|
| Hugh Barclay | Appointed | Director of Lands | 1948–1963 |
| Robert Coxon | Appointed | Director of Mining | 1948–1954 |
| Frederick Dowling | Labor | Batchelor | 1949–1954 |
| Keith Edmunds ^{[1]} | Appointed | Crown Law Officer | 1951–1954 |
| William Flynn ^{[1]} | Appointed | Crown Law Officer | 1948–1951 |
| John Huthnance | Appointed | Chief Clerk | 1949–1955 |
| Eric Izod | Independent | Darwin | 1949, 1951–1954 |
| Frank Johnson | Labor | Alice Springs | 1949–1954 |
| Robert Jones MBE ^{[2]} | Appointed | Apprentice Board Member | 1950–1951 |
| Reg Leydin ^{[3]} | Appointed | Government Secretary | 1948–1952, 1953–1954, 1963 |
| Matthew Luke | Independent Labor | Darwin | 1947–1954 |
| Douglas Macinnis | Appointed | Assistant Director of Lands and Surveys | 1952 |
| Reginald McCaffery ^{[4]} | Appointed | Acting Director of Native Affairs | 1953–1954 |
| Francis Moy ^{[4]} | Appointed | Director of Native Affairs | 1948–1953 |
| Wilhelm Petrick | Independent | Stuart | 1951–1962 |
| Len Purkiss | Independent | Tennant Creek | 1951–1965 |
| Charles Stahl ^{[3]} | Appointed | Acting Government Secretary | 1952–1953, 1954–1955, |
| Frank Vidgen ^{[2]} | Appointed | Director of Works | 1951–1954 |
| Dr Stephen Watsford | Appointed | Chief Medical Officer | 1951–1954 |
| Frank Wise | Appointed | Administrator | 1951–1956 |

^{1} Appointed member William Flynn fell ill in 1951, and had to leave the Northern Territory. Keith Edmunds was appointed to act in Flynn's role as Crown Law Officer, and was appointed to the Legislative Council in September.
^{2} Appointed member Robert Jones had his appointment terminated on 6 August 1951. Frank Vidgen was appointed as his replacement from 1 October 1951.
^{3} Appointed member Reg Leydin took a leave of absence as Government Secretary from 1 July 1952. His role and his place on the council were filled by Charles Stahl.
^{4} Appointed member Francis Moy resigned his post as Director of Native Affairs and his place on the Legislative Council on 21 May 1953. Reginald McCaffery was appointed in his place on the Council and as acting Director pending appointment of a permanent replacement.

== See also ==
- 1951 Northern Territory general election
