= 1965 Northern Territory Legislative Council election =

← 1962	30 October 1965	1968 →

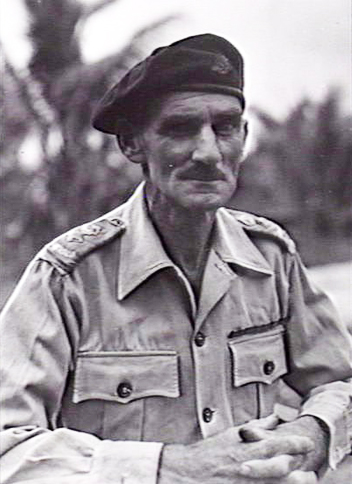
	First party	Second party
Leader	No leader	Lionel Rose
Party	Labor	North Australia
Leader since	N/A	August 1965
Leader's seat	N/A	Alice Springs (lost seat)
Last election		Did not exist
Seats won	3	1
Seat change		Steady

The 1965 Northern Territory legislative election was held on 30 October 1965 to elect eight members of the partly elected Northern Territory Legislative Council, the governing body of the Northern Territory of Australia.

An administrative change this saw the president of the council no longer being the Administrator of the Northern Territory, with the council electing its own president, Harry Chan, in December 1965.

== Background ==
This election was the genesis of a party system in the Northern Territory, with the majority of candidates being nominated by political parties. The Australian Labor Party (ALP) fielded seven candidates, while the new North Australia Party (NAP) − co-founded by independent MLC Lionel Rose in August 1965 − fielded three candidates in Central Australia, one in Darwin and one in Katherine.

== Results ==
Party	Seats
Territory Labor Party	3
North Australia Party	1
Independents	4
Total	8

== Aftermath ==
=== Disputed results ===
Lionel Rose was defeated in Alice Springs by 17 votes, however NAP candidate Tony Greatorex won a large majority in the sparsely populated seat of Stuart. The results in both seats were controversial, with the unsuccessful candidates claiming that their opponents had engaged in illegal conduct to secure the votes of Indigenous constituents.

Rose claimed that Labor candidate Charles Orr had bribed voters with alcohol, and petitioned the Court of Disputed Returns to overturn the result. David Smith, the Labor candidate in Stuart, petitioned the court to unseat Greatorex on the grounds that campaign workers had intimidated and misled Aboriginal voters.

=== By-elections ===
Independent Barkly MLC Len Purkiss died from silicosis shortly after the election on 24 November 1965. Labor's Eric Marks was elected to replace him in a by-election on 5 February 1966.

Labor MLC Peter Murray resigned as member for Arnhem in 1966 and was replaced by Ron Withnall (formerly an appointed Official Member) in a by-election on 26 November 1966.
