= Graeme Sawyer =

The Right Worshipful Graeme Sawyer

15th Lord Mayor of Darwin
- In office April 2008 – April 2012
- Deputy: Rotating
- Preceded by: Garry Lambert
- Succeeded by: Katrina Fong Lim

Personal details
- Born: 28 January 1957 (age 69)
- Party: Independent

Graeme Sawyer (born 28 January 1957) is the former Lord Mayor of the City of Darwin, the capital of the Northern Territory, Australia. He became Lord Mayor at an election in April 2008, when he won 56.8% of the vote after preferences. At the 2012 Local Government elections, he was beaten by Katrina Fong Lim, daughter of former Lord Mayor Alec Fong Lim, who received over 56% of the primary vote.

Sawyer was a guest on Dirty Jobs during an episode that featured the catching of cane toads, an invasive species in northern Australia. Sawyer runs an organisation which attempts to control the toad's population.
