= 1958 Northern Territory Legislative Council by-elections =

← 1957	28 June 1958	1960 →
	First party	Second party	Third party
	IND		IND
Leader	N/A	Paddy Carroll	Richard Ward
Party	Independent	Labor	Independent Labor
Leader's seat	N/A	Darwin	Darwin
Last election	4	1	1
Seats won	4	1	1
Seat change	Steady	Steady	Steady
Popular vote		N/A	N/A

The 1958 Northern Territory legislative by-elections were held on 28 June 1958 to elect all six members of the partly elected Northern Territory Legislative Council, the governing body of the Northern Territory of Australia.

The 1957 election had stressed the need for reform of the council, with virtually unanimous support in the council for elected members to constitute a majority. In 1958, a year after the first meeting of the council, every elected member resigned in frustration with the refusal of the federal government to announce such a reform.

The resignations triggered by-elections on 28 June for all seats — effectively another general election, although not in application of the Northern Territory (Administration) Act 1947.

All previous members were elected unopposed, except for Len Purkiss, who was re-elected with an increased majority in Tennant Creek.
