= Garry Lambert =

Lord Mayor of the City of Darwin
- In office 2007–2008
- Preceded by: Peter Adamson
- Succeeded by: Graeme Sawyer

Garry Lambert is an Australian politician. He was the Lord Mayor of Darwin from 2007 to 2008 and the unsuccessful Country Liberal Party candidate for the Northern Territory Legislative Assembly seat of Fannie Bay in the 2008 election.

Lambert was an alderman on the Darwin City Council prior to his election as Lord Mayor, and begun his working life in the Territory as a teacher. He has lived in various locations throughout the Territory, and had first entered politics when he was made secretary of the Mataranka Progress Association.

Lambert was elected to the role of Lord Mayor on 31 July 2007, after the resignation of disgraced former mayor Peter Adamson, convicted of stealing from the Darwin City Council. Following the conviction on 16 July 2007, the deputy mayor of the time, Allan Mitchell, acted as Lord Mayor for the remainder of the month. During this time the city council elected Lambert as their leader from their own ranks — an unprecedented event in Darwin's history, which usually votes for the mayor via public by-elections. Lambert publicly described himself as the "caretaker" of the role during his reign, much of which was spent dealing with the troubled legacy of his predecessor, and did not contest the April 2008 mayoral election, when he was succeeded by Graeme Sawyer.

Lambert began expressing an interest in contesting the 2008 territory election for the conservative Country Liberal Party not long after his retirement as Lord Mayor. He subsequently won preselection for the seat of Fannie Bay, a marginal seat being vacated by former Chief Minister Clare Martin. He was immediately touted as a potential CLP leader, and as a potential challenger to current Opposition Leader Terry Mills. He declined to state at the time who he had voted for at the 2005 election, refusing to deny reports that he had had a sign for Labor minister Kon Vatskalis in his yard during that campaign. He was tipped as an early favourite in election betting, with SportingBet odds marking him as narrow favourite. He was narrowly defeated by Labor candidate Michael Gunner, in a result that was not known for several days. Gunner's victory over Lambert gave Labor the final seat it needed to retain government.

Lambert's daughter, Stephanie, was the official ambassador for the 2008 Darwin Cup Carnival.
