= 7th State =

7th State may refer to:

- Maryland, one of the original Thirteen Colonies, and the seventh to ratify the Constitution of the United States of America in 1788
- Veracruz, one of the founding states of Mexico, and the seventh to ratify the Constitution of the United Mexican States in 1823
- List of proposed states of Australia, which would add a seventh state to the existing six states of the Commonwealth of Australia
  - Proposed Northern Territory statehood, the most commonly-mentioned proposal for a seventh state of Australia
- Seventh state of randomness
