= Lake Alexander (Northern Territory) =

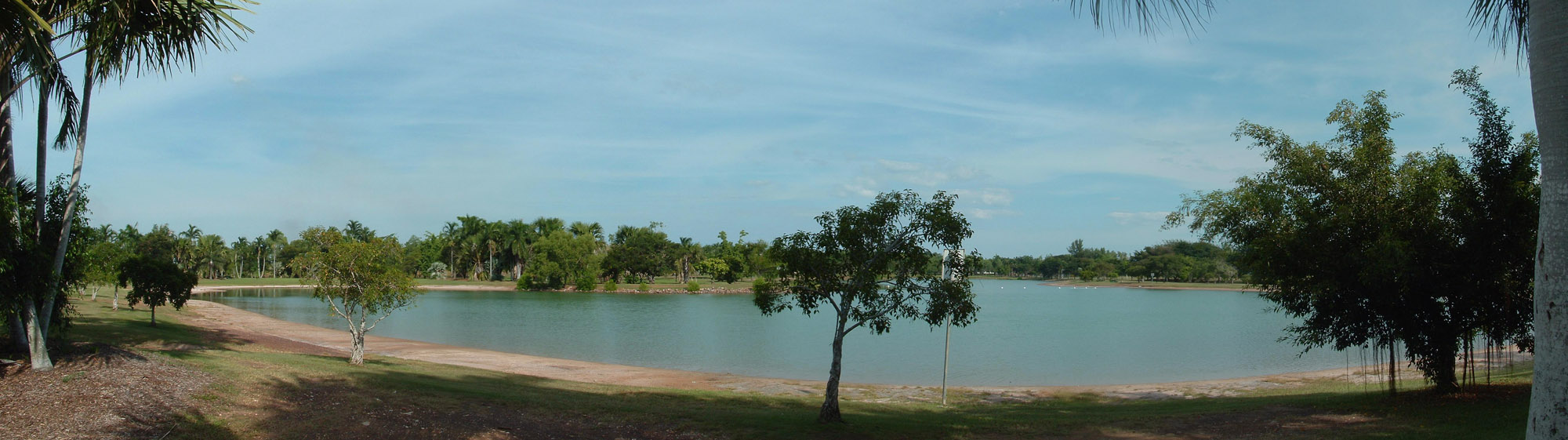
- Panorama

- Location within Northern Territory
- Location: Darwin, Northern Territory
- Coordinates: 12°25′S 130°50′E
- Type: reservoir
- Basin countries: Australia

Lake Alexander is a man-made lake named in honour of Alec Fong Lim who was Lord Mayor of Darwin from 1984 to 1990. The lake is located in Fannie Bay Darwin, Northern Territory, Australia and was officially opened on the 21 July 1991 for recreational use by the people of Darwin. The water in the lake is refreshed with pumps bringing water from the adjoining harbour through filters intended to prevent marine organisms from entering. This system has succeeded in keeping large predators such as saltwater crocodiles and bull sharks, and the deadly box jellyfish. However the lake has been closed to swimming twice, once due to a large Orange-spotted grouper and once due to an outbreak of a stinging species of Cassiopea jelly fish.

== Photographs ==
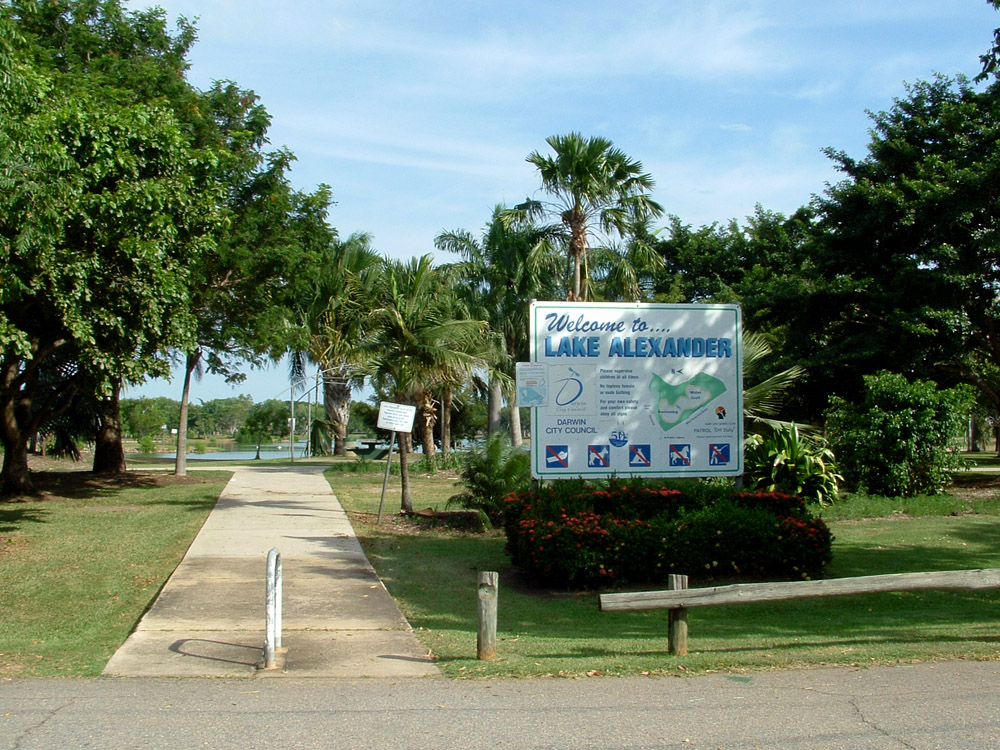
Welcome to Lake Alexander

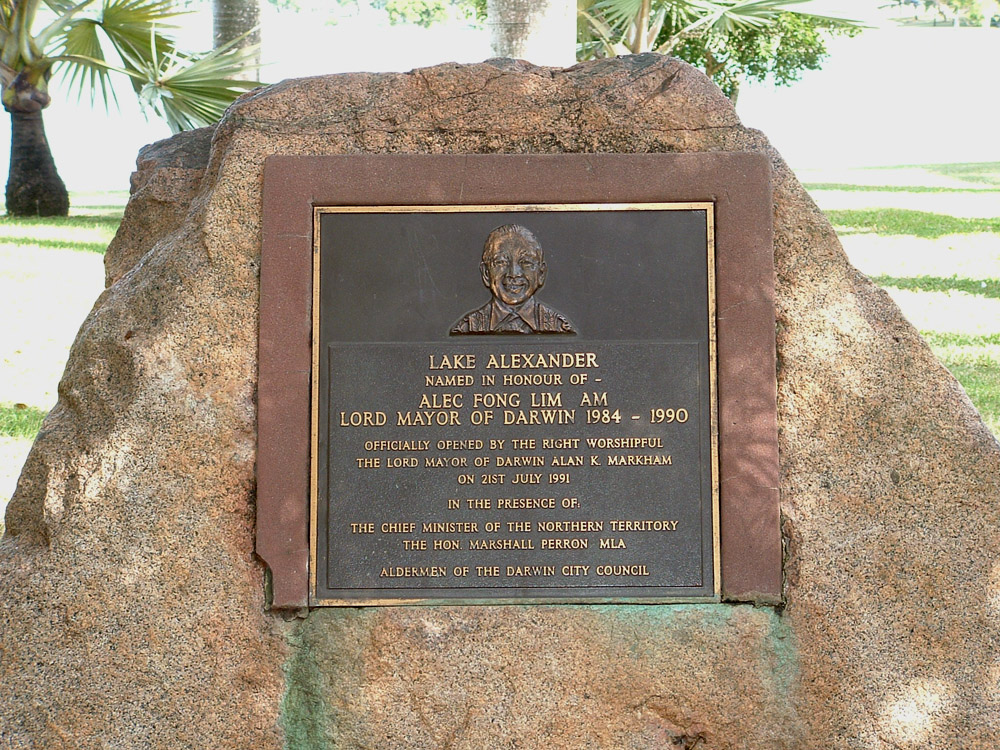
Brass plaque

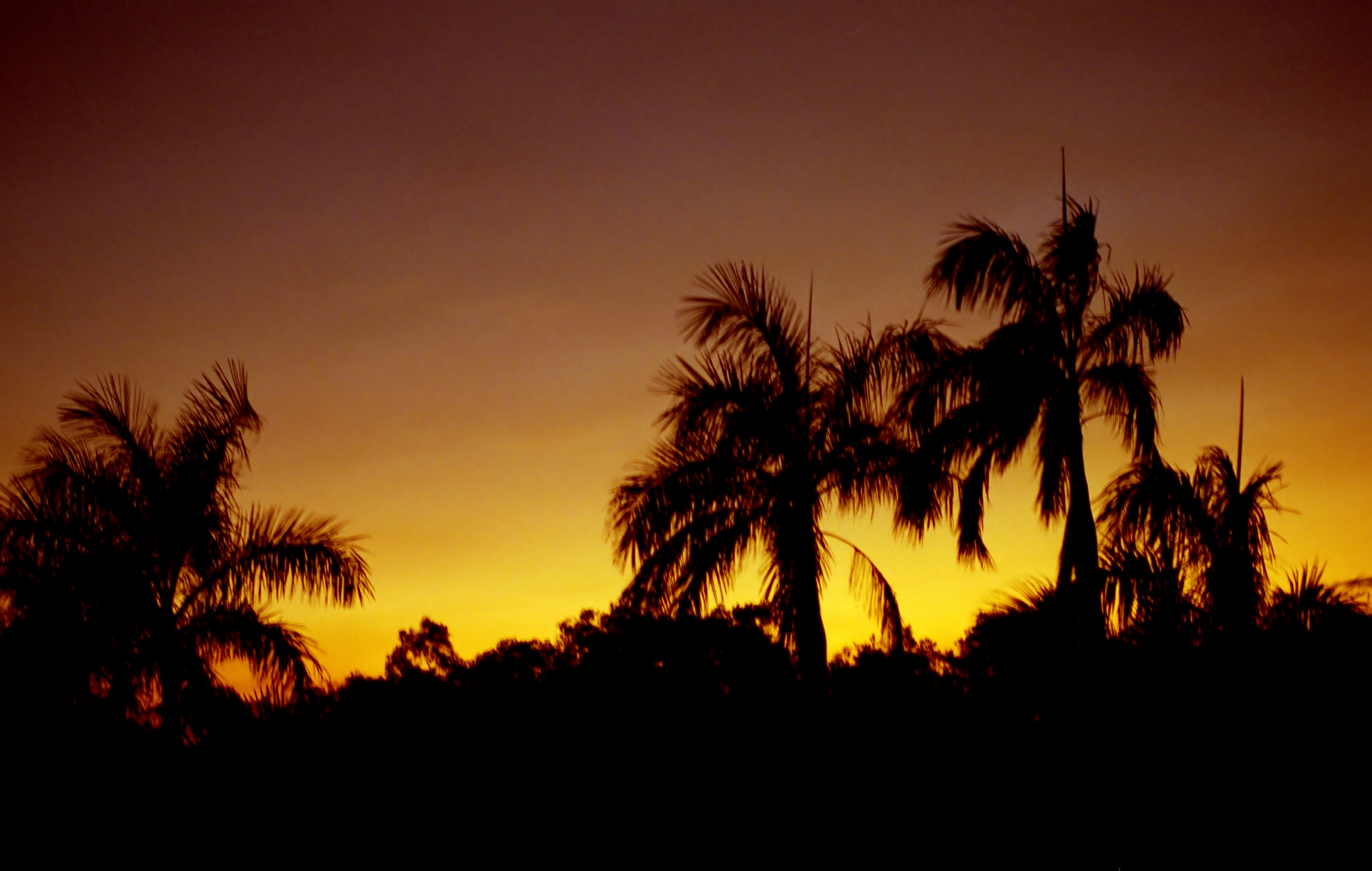
Sunset
