= Jack Higgins (disambiguation) =

Jack Higgins (1929–2022) was a British novelist.

Jack Higgins may also refer to:

- Sir Jack Higgins (RAF officer) (1875–1948), British Royal Air Force air marshal
- Jack Higgins (Gaelic footballer) (1903–1955), Irish Gaelic footballer
- Jack Higgins (rugby league), British rugby league footballer of the 1940s
- Jack Higgins (cartoonist) (born 1954), American cartoonist
- Jack Higgins (Australian footballer) (born 1999), Australian rules footballer
- Jack Higgins (runner) (born 2001), British middle-distance runner

== See also ==
- John Higgins (disambiguation)
