= Fred Drysdale =

Australian politician

Member of the Northern Territory Legislative Council
- In office 1951–1969

Personal details
- Party: Australian Labor Party

Frederick William Drysdale was an Australian politician from the Australian Labor Party. He was a member of the Northern Territory Legislative Council from 1951 to 1969.

He is the namesake of the electoral division of Drysdale which elects one member of the Legislative Assembly.

== See also ==
- Members of the Northern Territory Legislative Council, 1954–1957
- Members of the Northern Territory Legislative Council, 1960–1962
- Members of the Northern Territory Legislative Council, 1962–1965
- Members of the Northern Territory Legislative Council, 1965–1968
- Members of the Northern Territory Legislative Council, 1968–1971
