= Katrina Fong Lim =

Australian politician (born 1961)

Katrina Fong Lim AM

Lord Mayor of Darwin
- In office 3 April 2012 – 4 September 2017
- Preceded by: Graeme Sawyer
- Succeeded by: Kon Vatskalis

Personal details
- Born: 2 September 1961 (age 65) Darwin, Northern Territory, Australia
- Spouse: Tony Waite
- Relations: Alec Fong Lim (father)
- Education: University of Southern Queensland
- Occupation: Businesswoman
- Profession: Accounting

Katrina Mary Fong Lim AM (born 2 September 1961) is the former Lord Mayor of the city of Darwin, Northern Territory, Australia.

She completed a Bachelor of Business and Master of Professional Accounting at the University of Southern Queensland.

Civic offices
Preceded by Graeme Sawyer	Lord Mayor of Darwin; 2012–2017	Succeeded by Kon Vatskalis
