= Proposed Northern Territory statehood =

Proposed seventh state of Australia

Location of the Northern Territory in Australia

The Northern Territory (NT) is the most commonly mentioned potential seventh state of Australia. The most common proposed name for the state is Northern Australia (to match with the state of Western Australia; an alternative would be North Australia to match with the state of South Australia).

In a 1998 referendum, the voters of the Northern Territory rejected a statehood proposal that would have given the territory three senators, rather than the twelve held by the other states, although the name "Northern Territory" would have been retained. Alongside what was cited as an "arrogant" approach adopted by then Chief Minister Shane Stone, it is believed that most Territorians, regardless of their general views on statehood, were reluctant to adopt the particular model that was being voted on.

Currently, the Country Liberal Party is the only party in federal parliament that supports Northern Territory Statehood.

In July 2015, members of the Council of Australian Governments unanimously agreed with then Northern Territory Chief Minister Adam Giles that the territory should become its own state by 2018. This never happened.

It has been suggested that statehood for the Northern Territory may lead to a change in the Australian flag. The design elements of the Australian flag have been changed seven times since it was first flown on 3 September 1901. However, in 1908 a seventh point was added to the Commonwealth Star to represent the Australian territories—originally this star had six points, one for each of the former colonies. Should the Northern Territory become a state then consideration may be given to adding another point to the Commonwealth Star. However, at the time of the 1998 referendum, the Australian government stated that the flag would not change even if Territorians voted for statehood.

The Northern Territory Government appointed their first Minister for Statehood in 2006.

== See also ==
- North Australia
- States and territories of Australia
