= Country Liberal Party =

Northern Territory political party

Country Liberal Party of the Northern Territory
- Abbreviation: CLP
- Leader: Lia Finocchiaro
- Deputy Leader: Gerard Maley
- President: Nathan Land
- Senate Leader: Jacinta Nampijinpa Price
- Founded: July 1966 (Note: Earliest branch); July 1974 (Note: Current name adopted) (Note: On 29 July 1966, an Alice Springs-branch of the Country Party (CP) was established. This was the earliest formation of what became the Country Liberal Party. The new party was officially launched at the Annual Conference in Alice Springs on 20 July 1974 as a ‘fusion’ between the Country Party and the Liberal Party into a sole organisation, having both names in its title.)
- Headquarters: 229 McMillans Road, Jingili, Northern Territory
- Youth wing: Young Country Liberals
- Ideology: Conservatism; Historical: Populism
- Political position: Centre-right
- National affiliation: Liberal; National (Note: Although the CLP is officially associated with the National Party, there are currently no federal representatives of the CLP within the National Party caucus.)
- Colours: Orange (official); Blue (occasionally customary)
- Slogan: The Territory Party
- Legislative Assembly: 17 / 25
- House of Representatives: 0 / 2 (NT seats)
- Senate: 1 / 2 (NT seats)

Website
- www.clp.org.au

The Country Liberal Party of the Northern Territory (CLP), commonly known as the Country Liberals, is a centre-right and conservative political party in Australia's Northern Territory. In territory politics, it operates in a two-party system with the Australian Labor Party (ALP). It also contests federal elections as an associate of both the National Party of Australia and the Liberal Party of Australia.

The CLP originated in 1971 as a division of the Country Party (later renamed the National Party), the first local branches of which were formed in 1966. It adopted its current name in 1974 to attract Liberal Party supporters, but maintained a sole affiliation with the Country Party until 1979, when it acquired observer status with the Liberals while maintaining full voting rights in the Country Party. The party dominated the Northern Territory Legislative Assembly from the inaugural election in 1974 through to its defeat at the 2001 election, winning eight consecutive elections and providing the territory's first seven chief ministers. Following its defeat in 2001, the party did not return to power until 2012, but was defeated at the 2016 election. It remained in opposition until the 2024 election, in which it regained government in a landslide and the party's leader Lia Finocchiaro, who was elected party leader and leader of the opposition in February 2020, became Chief Minister.

At federal level, the CLP contests elections for the Northern Territory's House of Representatives and Senate seats, which also cover the Australian Indian Ocean Territories. It is registered with the Australian Electoral Commission (AEC). Its candidates do not form a separate parliamentary party but instead join either the Liberal or National party rooms – for instance, CLP senator Nigel Scullion was a long-serving deputy leader of the Nationals. Its sole current federal legislator Jacinta Nampijinpa Price, also a senator, sits with the Liberal Party.

The CLP's constitution describes it as an "independent conservative" party and commits it to Northern Territory statehood. It has typically prioritised economic development of the territory and originally drew most of its support from Outback towns and the pastoral industry. It later developed a voter base among the urban middle-class populations of Darwin, Palmerston and Alice Springs (the latter two of which are strongholds for the party). The CLP party provided the territory's first Indigenous MP (Hyacinth Tungutalum) and Australia's first Indigenous head of government (Adam Giles).

== History ==
=== Origins ===
A party system did not develop in the Northern Territory until the 1960s, due to its small population and lack of regular elections. The Australian Labor Party (ALP) contested elections as early as 1905, but rarely faced an organised opposition; anti-Labor candidates usually stood as independents. The regionalist North Australia Party (NAP), established by Lionel Rose for the 1965 Legislative Council election, has been cited as a predecessor of the CLP.

A Darwin branch of the Country Party was established on 20 July 1966, following by an Alice Springs branch on 29 July. The creation of the branches was spurred by the upcoming 1966 federal election and the announcement by the Northern Territory's federal MP Jock Nelson that he would be retiring from politics. The Country Party achieved its first electoral success with the election of Sam Calder as Nelson's replacement. It subsequently won four out of eleven seats at the 1968 Legislative Council election. A third branch of the party was established in Katherine in February 1971. The branches affiliated with the Federal Council of the Australian Country Party in July 1971, establishing a formal entity with a central council, executive and annual conference. The party was formally named the "Australian Country Party – Northern Territory".

The Country Party primarily drew its support from Alice Springs, small towns, and the pastoral industry, including "a fair proportion of the non-urban Aboriginal vote". The party did not have a strong presence in Darwin. A branch of the Liberal Party, the Country Party's coalition partner at a federal level, had been established in Darwin in 1966, representing commercial interests and urban professionals. The Liberals fielded candidates at the 1968 Legislative Council elections, but by 1970 the local branch had ceased to function. In 1973, the Country Party began actively working to include Liberal supporters within its organisation, spurred by the Whitlam government's announcement of a fully elective Northern Territory Legislative Assembly. Following informal negotiations led by Goff Letts, a joint committee was established to determine changes to the Country Party's constitution and policy. These were officially approved, along with the adoption of the name Country Liberal Party, at the party's annual conference in Alice Springs on 20 July 1974. Per its 2018 constitution, the party reckons 1974 as its founding date.

=== 1974–2001: Foundation and early dominance ===
The Whitlam government passed legislation in 1974 to establish a fully elected unicameral Northern Territory Legislative Assembly, replacing the previous partly elected Legislative Council, which had been in existence since 1947. The CLP won 17 out of 19 seats at the inaugural elections in October 1974, with independents holding the other two seats. Goff Letts became the inaugural majority leader, a title changed to chief minister after the granting of self-government in 1978. The CLP governed the Northern Territory from 1974 until the 2001 election. During this time, it never faced more than nine opposition members. Indeed, the CLP's dominance was so absolute that its internal politics were seen as a bigger threat than any opposition party. This was especially pronounced in the mid-1980s, when a series of party-room coups resulted in the Territory having three Chief Ministers during the 1983–87 term and also saw the creation of the Northern Territory Nationals as a short-lived splinter group under the leadership of former CLP chief minister Ian Tuxworth. According to ABC election analyst Antony Green, the CLP weathered these severe ructions because Territory Labor was "unelectable" at the time.

The Whitlam government also passed legislation to give the Northern Territory and Australian Capital Territory (ACT) representation in the federal Senate, with each territory electing two senators. Bernie Kilgariff was elected as the CLP's first senator at the 1975 federal election, sitting alongside Sam Calder in the parliamentary National Country Party. On 3 February 1979 a special conference of the CLP resolved that "the Federal CLP Parliamentarians be permitted to sit in the Party Rooms of their choice in Canberra". Despite personal misgivings, Kilgariff chose to sit with the parliamentary Liberal Party from 8 March 1979 in order that the CLP have representation in both parties, a practice which has been maintained where possible.

=== 2001–2012: In opposition ===
At the 2001 election, the Australian Labor Party won government by one seat, ending 27 years of CLP government. The loss marked a major turning point in Northern Territory politics, a result which was exacerbated when, at the 2005 election, the ALP won the second-largest majority government in the history of the Territory, reducing the once-dominant party to just four members in the Legislative Assembly. This result was only outdone by the 1974 election, in which the CLP faced only two independents as opposition. The CLP even lost two seats in Palmerston, an area where the ALP had never come close to winning any seats before.

In the 2001 federal election, the CLP won the newly formed seat of Solomon, based on Darwin/Palmerston, in the House of Representatives. In the 2004 federal election, the CLP held one seat in the House of Representatives, and one seat in the Senate. The CLP lost its federal lower house seat in the 2007 federal election, but regained it when Palmerston deputy mayor Natasha Griggs won back Solomon for the CLP. She sat with the Liberals in the House.

The 2008 election saw the CLP recover from the severe loss it suffered three years earlier, increasing its representation from four to 11 members. Following the 2011 decision of ALP-turned-independent member Alison Anderson to join the CLP, this increased CLP's representation to 12 in the Assembly, leaving the incumbent Henderson Government to govern in minority with the support of Independent MP Gerry Wood.

Historically, the CLP has been particularly dominant in the Territory's two major cities, Darwin/Palmerston and Alice Springs. However, in recent years the ALP has pulled even with the CLP in the Darwin area; indeed, its 2001 victory was fueled by an unexpected swing in Darwin.

=== 2012–2016: Return to government and internal conflict ===
The CLP under the leadership of Terry Mills returned to power in the 2012 election with 16 of 25 seats, defeating the incumbent Labor government led by Paul Henderson. In the lead up to the Territory election, CLP Senator Nigel Scullion sharply criticised the Federal Labor government for its suspension of the live cattle trade to Indonesia - an economic mainstay of the territory.

The election victory ended 11 years of ALP rule in the Northern Territory. The victory was also notable for the support it achieved from indigenous people in pastoral and remote electorates. Large swings were achieved in remote Territory electorates (where the indigenous population comprised around two-thirds of voters) and a total of five Aboriginal CLP candidates won election to the Assembly. Among the indigenous candidates elected were high-profile Aboriginal activist Bess Price and former ALP member Alison Anderson. Anderson was appointed Minister for Indigenous Advancement. In a nationally reported speech in November 2012, Anderson condemned welfare dependency and a culture of entitlement in her first ministerial statement on the status of Aboriginal communities in the Territory and said the CLP would focus on improving education and on helping create real jobs for indigenous people.

==== Leadership spills ====
Adam Giles replaced Mills as Chief Minister of the Northern Territory and party leader at the 2013 CLP leadership ballot on 13 March while Mills was on a trade mission in Japan. Giles was sworn in as Chief Minister on 14 March, becoming the first indigenous head of government of an Australian state or territory.

Willem Westra van Holthe challenged Giles at the a leadership ballot on 2 February 2015 and was elected leader by the party room in a late night vote conducted by phone. However, Giles refused to resign as Chief Minister following the vote. On 3 February, ABC News reported that officials were preparing an instrument for Giles' removal by the Administrator. The swearing-in of Westra van Holthe, which had been scheduled for 11:00 local time (01:30 UTC), was delayed. After a meeting of the parliamentary wing of the CLP, Giles announced that he would remain as party leader and Chief Minister, and that Westra van Holthe would be his deputy.

==== Defections and minority government ====
After four defections during the parliamentary term, the CLP was reduced to minority government by July 2015. Giles raised the possibility of an early election on 20 July stating that he would "love" to call a snap poll, but that it was "pretty much impossible to do". Crossbenchers dismissed the notion of voting against a confidence motion to bring down the government.

=== 2016–2024: In opposition ===
Territory government legislation passed in February 2016 changed the voting method of single-member electorates from full-preferential voting to optional preferential voting ahead of the 2016 territory election held on 27 August.

Federally, a MediaReach seat-level opinion poll of 513 voters in the seat of Solomon conducted 22−23 June ahead of the 2016 federal election held on 2 July surprisingly found Labor candidate Luke Gosling heavily leading two-term CLP incumbent Natasha Griggs 61–39 on the two-party vote from a large 12.4 percent swing. The CLP lost Solomon to Labor at the election, with Gosling defeating Griggs 56–44 on the two-party vote from a 7.4 percent swing.

Polling ahead of the 2016 Territory election indicated a large swing against the CLP, including a near-total collapse in Darwin/Palmerston. By the time the writs were dropped, commentators had almost universally written off the CLP. At 27 August Territory election, the CLP was swept from power in a massive Labor landslide, suffering easily the worst defeat of a sitting government in Territory history and one of the worst defeats a governing party has ever suffered at the state or territory level in Australia. The party not only lost all of the bush seats it picked up in 2012, but was all but shut out of Darwin/Palmerston, winning only one seat there. All told, the CLP only won two seats, easily its worst showing in an election. Giles himself lost his own seat, becoming the second Majority Leader/Chief Minister to lose his own seat. Even before Giles' defeat was confirmed, second-term MP Gary Higgins—the only surviving member of the Giles cabinet—was named the party's new leader, with Lia Finocchiaro as his deputy. On 20 January 2020, Higgins announced his resignation as party leader and announced his retirement at the next election. Finocchiaro succeeded him as CLP leader and leader of the opposition on 1 February 2020.

Finocchiaro led the CLP to a modest recovery at the 2020 Territory election. The CLP picked up a six-seat swing, boosting its seat count to eight. However, it failed to make significant inroads in the Darwin/Palmerston area, winning only two seats there, including that of Finocchiaro.

The CLP lost the seat of Daly to Labor in a 2021 by-election, the first time an incumbent government had won a seat from the opposition in territory history.

=== 2024–present: Return to government ===
The CLP won a landslide victory in the 2024 Northern Territory general election.

== Ideology ==
The CLP stands for office in the Northern Territory Assembly and Federal Parliament of Australia and primarily concerns itself with representing Territory interests. It is a regionally based party, that has parliamentary representation in both the Federal Parliament and at the territory level. It brands as a party with strong roots in the Territory.

The CLP competes against the Territory Labor Party (the local branch of Australia's largest social democratic party). It is closely affiliated with, but is independent from the Liberal Party of Australia (a mainly urban, pro-business party comprising mainly liberal membership) and the National Party of Australia (a conservative and regional interests party).

The foreword to the constitution of the party describes it as an "independent conservative political party". One of the objectives in the party's constitution is to "work toward the achievement of Statehood in the Northern Territory". The party promotes traditional Liberal Party values such as individualism and private enterprise, and what it describes as "progressive" political policy such as full statehood for the Northern Territory.

In February 2023, the party voted to oppose the Voice to Parliament.

== Voter base ==
Traditionally, the CLP's voting base has been mostly concentrated in Palmerston, Alice Springs, Katherine and parts of Darwin, as well as in rural towns where the majority of people are white.

Initially, remote Indigenous communities around Australia voted strongly for Labor, but in recent years, Indigenous Australians have been more frequently voting for the Coalition, particularly in remote communities. At the same time, Labor has become stronger in Darwin and Palmerston. At the 2012 general election, the CLP won government by gaining five remote seats where the majority of the population identify as Aboriginal and that were traditionally considered safe seats for Labor. In 2016, the CLP was defeated by Labor in a landslide, and thus lost most of its ground territory-wide. However, in 2020, the CLP gained back some of its ground in remote areas (including narrowly gaining the seat of Barkly, which they did not win in 2012, with a huge swing to them).

The CLP's rule was once so tight, that a former minister once said the CLP had a "'rightful inheritance of being the party that runs this place'".

=== Demographics ===
A 2023 poll conducted by the Redbridge Group, which found that the CLP would win the 2024 general election in a landslide, looked at demographics by voting intention in the Northern Territory. The poll found that the CLP has a support base among many demographics. The poll found that the CLP is overwhelmingly more popular than Labor among middle and high-income earners and people over 40, and that the CLP had more support than Labor among both Indigenous and non-Indigenous people, English and non-English speakers, and both men and women. The poll found that people aged between 18 and 40 are still more likely to vote for the CLP than they are any party, but by a smaller margin than people over 40.

As less parties and candidates contest Northern Territory general elections than they do Australian federal elections in the Northern Territory, the CLP, Labor and independents usually have a higher vote share at territory elections than at federal elections in the Northern Territory due to the absence of right-wing minor parties such as Pauline Hanson's One Nation and the fact that the Greens do not run in every seat at territory elections. On the territory level, the Redbridge poll found that 25% of One Nation supporters would vote for the CLP on the territory level, second to only the Shooters, Fishers and Farmers Party (SFF) at 33%.

== Organisation ==
Branch delegates and members of the party's Central Council attend the Annual Conference of the Country Liberal Party to decide the party's platform. The Central Council is composed of the party's office bearers, its leaders from the Territory Assembly and the Federal Parliament and representatives of party branches.

The Annual Conference of the Country Liberal Party, attended by branch delegates and members of the party's Central Council, decides matters relating to the party's platform and philosophy. The Central Council administers the party and makes decisions on pre-selections. It is composed of the party's office bearers, its leaders in the Northern Territory Legislative Assembly, members in the Federal Parliament, and representation from each of the party's branches.

The CLP president has full voting rights with the National Party and observer status with the Liberal Party. Both the Liberals and Nationals receive Country Liberal delegations at their conventions. After federal elections, the CLP directs its federal members and senators as to which of the two other parties they should sit with in the parliamentary chamber. In practice, since the 1980s CLP House members usually sit with the Liberals, while CLP Senators usually sit with the Nationals.

== Electoral performance ==
=== Legislative Assembly ===
Election	Leader	Votes	%	Seats	+/–	Position	Status
1974	Goff Letts	13,690	49.0	17 / 19	▲17	▲1st	Majority
1977	Goff Letts	12,769	40.1	12 / 19	▼5	1st	Majority
1980	Paul Everingham	28,637	50.0	11 / 19	▼1	1st	Majority
1983	Paul Everingham	28,637	58.2	19 / 25	▲8	1st	Majority
1987	Stephen Hatton	20,074	39.4	16 / 25	▼3	1st	Majority
1990	Marshall Perron	31,758	48.8	14 / 25	▼2	1st	Majority
1994	Marshall Perron	38,266	51.9	17 / 25	▲3	1st	Majority
1997	Shane Stone	41,722	54.7	18 / 25	▲1	1st	Majority
2001	Denis Burke	36,926	45.4	10 / 25	▼8	▼2nd	Opposition
2005	Denis Burke	30,827	35.7	4 / 25	▼6	2nd	Opposition
2008	Terry Mills	36,334	45.4	11 / 25	▲7	2nd	Opposition
2012	Terry Mills	46,653	50.6	16 / 25	▲5	▲1st	Majority
2016	Adam Giles	31,263	31.8	2 / 25	▼14	▼2nd	Opposition
2020	Lia Finocchiaro	32,021	31.3	8 / 25	▲6	2nd	Opposition
2024	Lia Finocchiaro	48,666	49.2	17 / 25	▲9	▲1st	Majority

== Parliamentary Leaders ==
#	Leader	Electorate	Term start	Term end	Time in office	Elections contested	Chief Minister
1	Goff Letts	Victoria River	19 October 1974	12 August 1977	2 years, 297 days	1974, 1977	Himself (Note: The position was then known as the Majority Leader) (1974–1977)
2	Paul Everingham	Jingili	13 August 1977	15 October 1984	7 years, 63 days	1980, 1983	Himself (Note: From 1977–1978 Everingham served as Majority Leader- which was the name for the position at the time) (1974–1977)
3	Ian Tuxworth	Barkly	17 October 1984	10 May 1986	1 year, 205 days	none	Himself (1984–1986)
4	Stephen Hatton	Nightcliff	15 May 1986	13 July 1988	2 years, 59 days	1987	Himself (1986–1988)
5	Marshall Perron	Fannie Bay	14 July 1988	16 May 1995	6 years, 306 days	1990, 1994	Himself (1988–1995)
6	Shane Stone	Port Darwin	26 May 1995	8 February 1999	3 years, 258 days	1997	Himself (1995–1999)
7	Denis Burke	Brennan	8 February 1999	15 November 2003	3 years, 258 days	2001	Himself (1999–2001)
7	Denis Burke	Brennan	8 February 1999	15 November 2003	3 years, 258 days	2001	Martin (2001–2007)
8	Terry Mills	Blain	15 November 2003	4 February 2005	1 year, 81 days	none	Martin (2001–2007)
(7)	Denis Burke	Brennan	7 February 2005	17 June 2005	130 days	2005	Martin (2001–2007)
9	Jodeen Carney	Araluen	29 June 2005	28 January 2008	2 years, 213 days	none	Martin (2001–2007)
9	Jodeen Carney	Araluen	29 June 2005	28 January 2008	2 years, 213 days	none	Henderson (2007–2012)
(8)	Terry Mills	Blain	29 January 2008	13 March 2013	5 years, 43 days	2008, 2012	Henderson (2007–2012)
(8)	Terry Mills	Blain	29 January 2008	13 March 2013	5 years, 43 days	2008, 2012	Himself (2012–2013)
10	Adam Giles	Braitling	14 March 2013	2 September 2016	3 years, 172 days	2016	Himself (2013–2016)
11	Gary Higgins	Daly	2 September 2016	1 February 2020	3 years, 152 days	none	Gunner (2016–2022)
12	Lia Finocchiaro	Spillett	1 February 2020	Incumbent	6 years, 293 days	2020, 2024	Gunner (2016–2022)
12	Lia Finocchiaro	Spillett	1 February 2020	Incumbent	6 years, 293 days	2020, 2024	Fyles (2022–2023)
12	Lia Finocchiaro	Spillett	1 February 2020	Incumbent	6 years, 293 days	2020, 2024	Lawler (2023–2024)
12	Lia Finocchiaro	Spillett	1 February 2020	Incumbent	6 years, 293 days	2020, 2024	Herself (2024–present)

== See also ==
- 2024 Northern Territory general election
