= John Higgins (disambiguation) =

John Higgins (born 1975) is a Scottish snooker player.

John Higgins may also refer to:

== Politics ==
- John J. Higgins (1865–1944), American politician
- John Higgins (Australian politician) (1884–1936), New South Wales politician
- John Gilbert Higgins (1891–1963), Newfoundland politician
- John Patrick Higgins (1893–1955), U.S. Representative from Massachusetts

== Sports ==
- John Higgins (cricketer) (1885–1970), English cricketer
- John Higgins (swimmer) (1916–2004), American swimmer and swimming coach
- John Higgins (footballer, born 1930) (1930–2017), Scottish footballer (Hibernian, St Mirren, Swindon Town)
- John Higgins (footballer, born 1932) (1932–2005), English footballer (Bolton)
- John Higgins (footballer, born 1933) (1933–1994), Scottish footballer (Celtic)
- John Higgins (bowls) (1940–2012), Irish lawn and indoor bowler
- John Higgins (Gaelic footballer) (born 1963), Irish Gaelic footballer (Kerry)
- Johnnie Lee Higgins (born 1983), American football wide receiver for the Oakland Raiders

== Entertainment ==
- John C. Higgins (1908–1995), American screenwriter
- Jon B. Higgins (1939–1984), American musician who specialized in Carnatic music
- John Higgins (comics) (born 1949), English comic book artist and writer
- John Michael Higgins (born 1963), American actor, voice actor, comedian and game show host

== Other ==
- John Higgins (poet) (c. 1544 – by 1620), English cleric, poet and linguist
- John Higgins (gunman) (1848–1914), cowboy of the Old West
- John Christopher Higgins (died 1938), perpetrator of the 1923 Waikino school shooting
- John Michael Higgins (businessman) (1862–1937), Australian businessman and metallurgist
- John Woodman Higgins (1874–1961), American steel businessman, armory museum founder
- John Higgins (admiral) (1899–1973), U.S. Navy rear admiral
- John Seville Higgins (1904–1992), bishop of the Episcopal Diocese of Rhode Island
- John M. Higgins (1961–2006), American reporter and editor specializing in the cable television industry
- John Higgins (Newcastle town crier) (19th century), town crier, on whom the character Johnny Luik-up is based
- Sir John Higgins of Montoge, Irish physician

== See also ==
- John Higgin, rugby league footballer of the 1930s and 1940s for Barrow
- Jonathan Higgins, a character in Magnum, P.I. played by John Hillerman
- Jack Higgins (disambiguation)
