= Alec Fong Lim =

Australian politician (1931–1990)

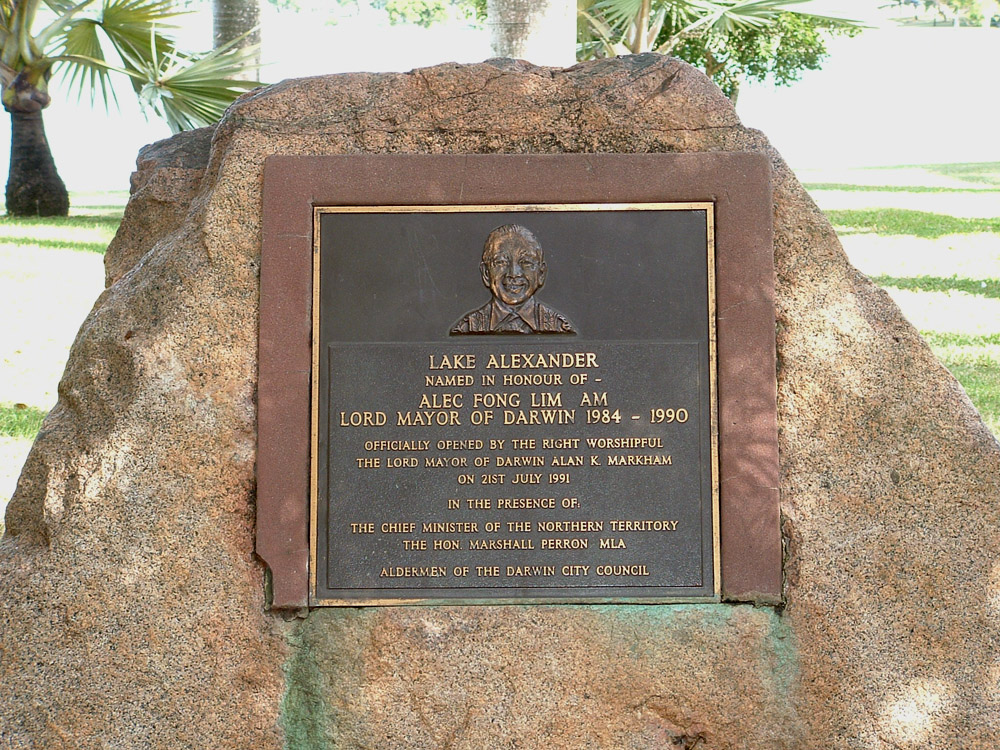
Alec Fong memorial

Alexander Fong Lim AM (鄺鴻銓, 18 February 1931 – 3 September 1990) was the eleventh Lord Mayor of the City of Darwin, the capital city of the Northern Territory of Australia. He served as Lord Mayor from 1 June 1984 to 9 August 1990. Notably he was also the first Chinese Australian Lord Mayor and was awarded the Order of Australia in 1986 for services to the community and local government.

== Biography ==
Born 18 February 1931 in Katherine, Fong Lim was the sixth of nine children of George and Lorna Fong Lim. Both George and Lorna Fong Lim were born in Australia and the family spent Alec Fong Lim's early years in Katherine where his father was a tailor, ran a general store and owned a peanut farm. When Alec Fong Lim was seven the family relocated to Darwin to run several businesses. During the war years the family was evacuated to Alice Springs where they ran a cafe and tailor and Fong Lim attended Scotch College in Adelaide, South Australia.

Following the war the family moved back to Darwin to resume their businesses, which eventually included the Vic Hotel. Fong Lim worked in the hotel until it was sold in 1965. In the early 1970s, the family also owned and operated the legendary Lim's Hotel in Rapid Creek. Following the sale of the original Vic Hotel, Fong Lim owned and ran a fine wine and food wholesale business located in the Parap Shopping center and invested in several other local businesses. His was also a popular course bookmaker at the Fannie Bay race course.

He died on 3 September 1990 shortly after resigning from the office of Lord Mayor. He was succeeded as Lord Mayor by Alan Markham.

Fong Lim and his wife Norma Fong Lim had six daughters and his daughter, Katrina Fong Lim, was later elected Lord Mayor of the City of Darwin in 2012.

== Posthumous honours ==
On 25 September 1990 a motion of condolence was issued in the Legislative Assembly of the Northern Territory and in recognition of his dedication to the people of Darwin.

Lake Alexander, a man-made lake, was named for him when it was opened on 21 July 1991 and a memorial was placed there to honour him. The road leading to the lake was also renamed Alec Fong Lim Drive.

In 2008 the Electoral division of Fong Lim was also named in his honour.

== Oral history recordings ==
Oral history recordings are available for Fong Lim with one recorded in 1981 held at Library & Archives NT and another from 1986 held the National Library of Australia.

== Community service ==
Positions held included:

- Founding member of the local Apex club
- Chairman of the St John Council
- Vice President of the NT Spastics Association
- Chairman of the National Australia Day Council NT Inc
- Trustee of the Cyclone Tracy Fund
- Member of the NT Australia Bicentennial Committee
