= North Australia Party =

Political party in Northern Territory, Australia

- Leader: Lionel Rose
- Founder: Lionel Rose; Peter Leunig
- Founded: August 1965
- Dissolved: c. 1966
- Headquarters: Alice Springs
- Ideology: Regionalism
- Northern Territory Legislative Council: 1 / 18 (1965–1966)
- Alice Springs Town Management Board: 5 / 5 (1966)

The North Australia Party (NAP) was a short-lived political party in Australia's Northern Territory, primarily active in Alice Springs and the surrounding areas of Central Australia. It was founded in 1965 under the leadership of Lionel Rose and contested the Northern Territory Legislative Council election later that year, winning a single seat. The party has been cited as a predecessor of the modern Country Liberal Party (CLP).

== History ==
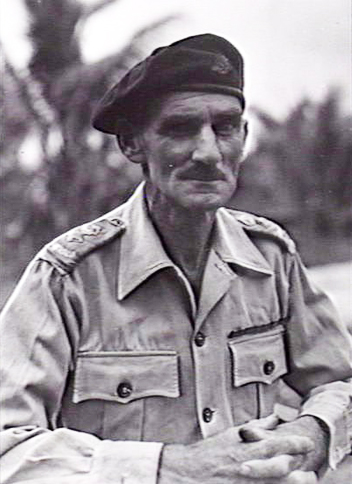
Lionel Rose, party leader

The creation of the NAP was announced on 12 August 1965 by Lionel Rose, an independent member of the Legislative Council, who said it had been established at a meeting in Alice Springs the previous week. Rose was described as the party's leader, although Alice Springs businessman Peter Leunig has also been cited as a founder of the party. The NAP printed its own newspaper, The Times, and employed a full-time organiser in the lead-up to the Legislative Council elections in October 1965. A Darwin branch of the party was established in September. The NAP was "vigorously opposed" by both the Darwin-based Northern Territory News and the Alice Springs-based Centralian Advocate. The News claimed that the party was a front for the Liberal Party and implied that it was being funded by external sources.

The 1965 election was the first in which a majority of candidates were members of political parties and the first at which the Australian Labor Party (ALP) had faced an organised opponent. The NAP fielded five candidates – three in Central Australia, one in Darwin and one in Katherine – compared with seven for the ALP. The party won a single seat, with Tony Greatorex winning a large majority in the sparsely populated seat of Stuart. Rose was defeated in Alice Springs by 17 votes. The results in both seats were controversial, with the unsuccessful candidates claiming that their opponents had engaged in illegal conduct to secure the votes of Indigenous constituents. Rose claimed that the ALP candidate Charles Orr in Alice Springs had bribed voters with alcohol and petitioned the Court of Disputed Returns to overturn the result. David Smith, the ALP candidate in Stuart, petitioned the court to unseat Greatorex on the grounds that campaign workers had intimidated and misled Aboriginal voters.

The NAP unsuccessfully contested a Legislative Council by-election for the Tennant Creek seat in February 1966. In the same month, the party won all five seats on the Alice Springs Town Management Board, albeit on a turnout of 17 percent. However, the party "soon faded away". Its role as primary opponent to the ALP in the Northern Territory was taken by the Country Party, which contested its first Legislative Council by-election in November 1966. Greatorex was re-elected to the Legislative Council in 1968 under the Country Party banner.

== Policies ==
Rose stated that the "first object of the party would be to promote the economic, social and political development of northern Australia". He believed that the Northern Territory had been neglected by the federal government and that a party dedicated to the Territory should be established. However, the party "appealed to conservative opinion" and effectively functioned as the opposition to the ALP in the absence of any organised parties.

In announcing the party's formation, Rose stated that it was intended to operate not only in the Northern Territory but also in North Queensland and the Kimberley region of Western Australia. Its establishment was welcomed by the People the North Committee, a Queensland-based organisation, which promised co-operation with the new party.

== Legacy ==
The NAP has been cited as a predecessor of the modern Country Liberal Party (CLP), which was established in 1974, in that the CLP inherited its "strong regional orientation". A number of NAP members, including future senator Bernie Kilgariff, were involved in establishing the local branch of the Country Party, the immediate predecessor of the CLP. However, the party's founders did not join the CLP – Rose had no further political involvement in politics, while Leunig joined the ALP and stood for the party at the 1974 Legislative Assembly election.

== Sources ==
- Heatley, Alistair J. (1998). The Territory Party: The Northern Territory Country Liberal Party 1974-1998. NTU Press. ISBN 9781876248208.
