= Arthur Driver =

Australian engineer, and army officer

Arthur Robert Driver (25 November 1909 – 18 May 1981) was an Australian engineer, army officer and public servant. He was the Administrator of the Northern Territory between 1946 and 1951.

== Early life and education ==
Driver was born on 25 November 1909 in Albany, Western Australia. In 1918 his family moved to Perth, where he was educated. His main secondary education was undertaken at Hale School, Perth, where he became head prefect. Outside of his studies, he was very active in sports, competing in the school cricket, football and athletics teams. He went on to study at the University of Western Australia. He continued to be a prominent sportsman, particularly in rowing and athletics. He graduated from UWA in 1930.

== Career ==
Between 1928 and 1940, Driver worked as a civil engineer for the Public Works Department of Western Australia. During the Second World War, he served in the army, initially as a member of the 2/4th Pioneer Battalion and then with the 23rd Australian Infantry Brigade. He rose through the ranks, and in February 1944 was appointed brigade major. In 1945, he became a General Staff officer and worked at Advanced Land HQ. For his military service, he was awarded the War Medal and Australian Service Medal.

After the war, he returned to working in the Public Works Department, until he was appointed Administrator of the Northern Territory on 1 July 1946. He remained in this position until his resignation on 30 June 1951. After this, he moved to Italy to work as the Chief Australian Migration Officer. He spent several subsequent years working in the field of migration. He died on 18 May 1981.

== Personal life ==
Driver married Hazel Kelly on 8 August 1935. They had two children. During Driver's term as Administrator of the Northern Territory, they also informally adopted a Savunese boy named Bas Wie, who had arrived in the country as a stowaway in the undercarriage of an aeroplane. Bas Wie lived with the Drivers at Government House, until Arthur left Darwin to take up his new post in Italy.

Later, the Drivers' marriage was dissolved, and Arthur married Marjorie Campbell Driver (née Leighton) on 18 October 1949. They had one daughter.

Arthur's sister was feminist and broadcaster Irene Greenwood who died in 1992.

Government offices
Preceded by Aubrey Abbott	Administrator of the Northern Territory; 1946–1951	Succeeded by Frank Wise
