= James C. Archer =

Australian public servant

James Archer OBE

Administrator of the Northern Territory
- In office 1 July 1956 – 31 March 1961
- Preceded by: Frank Wise
- Succeeded by: Roger Nott

Personal details
- Born: 28 July 1900 Elphinstone, Victoria, Australia
- Died: 23 December 1980 (aged 80) Canberra, Australia

James Clarence Archer OBE (28 July 1900 – 23 December 1980) was an Australian public servant and Administrator of the Northern Territory. Archer, Northern Territory is named after him.

Employment history

- World War II: Lieutenant in Papua New Guinea Volunteer Rifles
- 1942 - Led a party of Rabaul citizens to escape from the Japanese as they landed on New Britain
- Commonwealth Public Service
- Attorney-General’s Office New Guinea
- 1983 - Delegate of the Custodian of Expropriated Properties of New Guinea 1983
- Deputy Secretary Department of Territories
- 1956 to 1961 - Appointed Administrator of the Northern Territory

Honours and awards

- 1956 - Officer of the Order of the British Empire in the Civil Division (OBE)

Memorial: Archer, Palmerston, Northern Territory - died 23 December 1980 in Canberra

Government offices
Preceded by Frank Wise	Administrator of the Northern Territory; 1956–1961	Succeeded by Roger Nott
