= Electoral division of Tennant Creek =

Electoral division in the Northern Territory, Australia

Tennant Creek Northern Territory—Legislative Council
- Created: 1947
- Abolished: 1965
- Namesake: Tennant Creek
- Electors: 300 (1947)
- Demographic: Remote

Tennant Creek was an electoral division of the Legislative Council in Australia's Northern Territory.

The electorate was abolished ahead of the 1965 election.

== History ==
The electorate, named after the town of Tennant Creek, was one of the original single-member seats at the Legislative Council's formation in 1947, with Victor Webster elected as the seat's first member.

On 17 May 1950, Webster resigned after losing his job as a medical officer with the federal Department of Health when the Chifley government was defeated at the 1949 federal election, and having to leave the Territory. On 16 November 1950, Administrator Arthur Driver appointed John Higgins as his replacement, ignoring Charles Priest who had contested the seat against Webster at the 1949 election.

Higgins was defeated by Len Purkiss at the 1951 election.

At the 1958 by-elections, Tennant Creek was the only seat contested, with Purkiss re-elected with an increased majority.

== Members for Tennant Creek ==
Member	Party	Term
Victor Webster	Non-Socialist Labor	1947–1950
John Higgins	Independent	1950–1951
Len Purkiss	Independent	1951–1965
