= Victor Webster (politician) =

Australian politician and medical officer

Victor Henry Webster (1905–1980) was an Australian politician and medical officer. Trained in Melbourne and Perth, he moved to Tennant Creek. He was a member of the Northern Territory Legislative Council for Tennant Creek from 1947 to 1950. He published a book, Bush Medicine, in 1948.
