= Harry Chan =

Australian politician

The Right Worshipful Harry Chan( Chinese: 陳天福 ） OBE
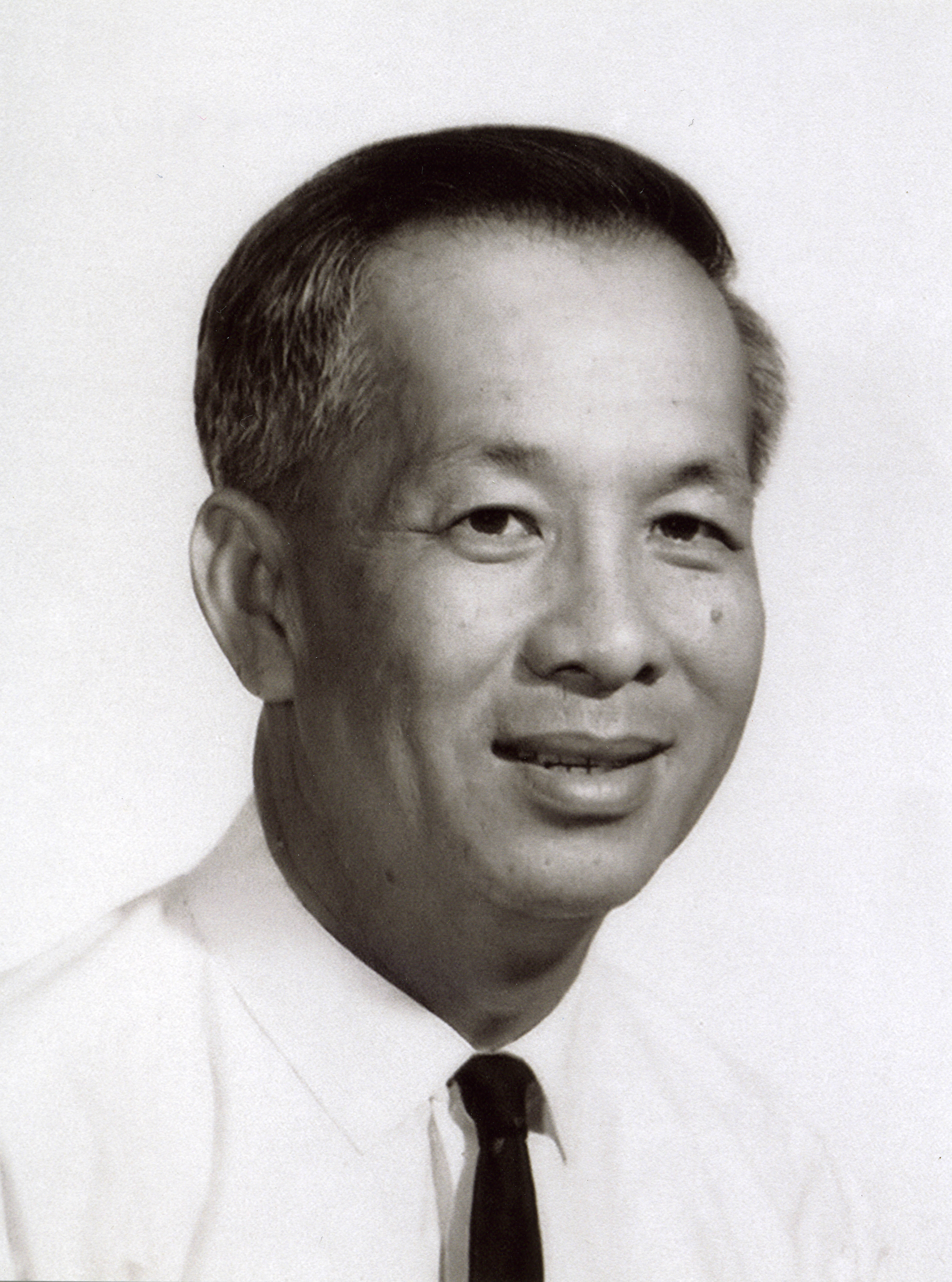
- Businessman, mayor and politician Harry Chan from Darwin, Northern Territory.

6th Lord Mayor of Darwin
- In office 1966–1969
- Preceded by: Lucius Richardson
- Succeeded by: Harold "Tiger" Brennan

Personal details
- Born: Hen Fook Chan; 14 June 1918 Darwin, Northern Territory, Australia
- Died: 5 August 1969 (aged 51) Darwin, Northern Territory, Australia
- Spouse: Lilyan Yuen

Hen Fook "Harry" Chan OBE (14 June 1918 – 5 August 1969) was an Australian businessman and politician who was mayor of Darwin.

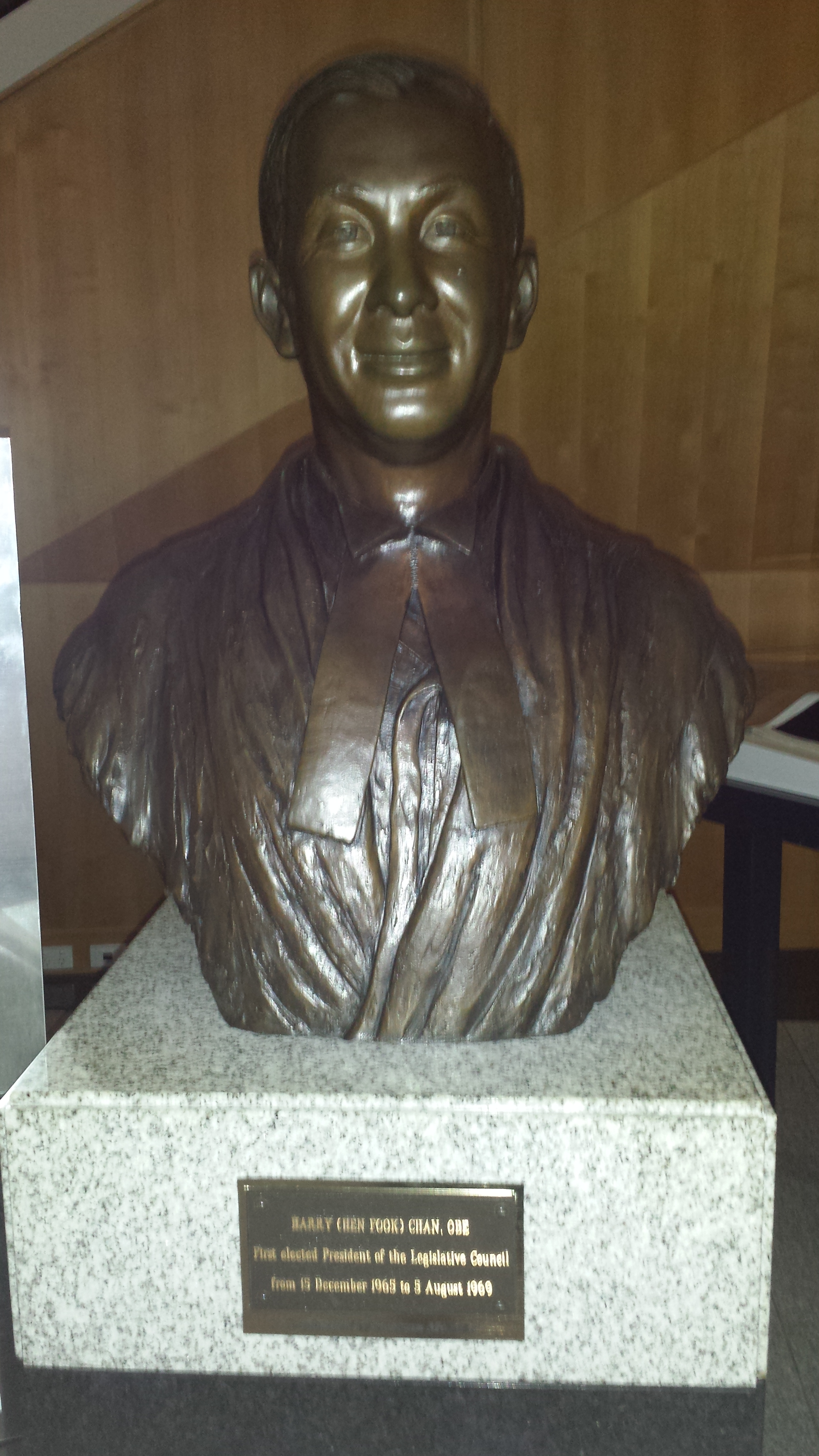
Bust of Harry Chan first elected President of the Legislative Council of the Northern Territory.

Serving from 1966 to his death in 1969, he was the first ethnic Chinese mayor of Darwin.

== Early life ==
Chan was born in Darwin on 14 June 1918, son of Chan Fong Yuen, a Cantonese migrant and mother, Wong Quee. Chan married Lilyan Yuen, 18 January 1941. They had three sons and a daughter, the eldest and Lilyan were evacuated on the SS Zealandia in late 1941.

== Businessman ==
Chan and his wife opened a store in a Sidney Williams hut in Smith Street, later leasing the land to Woolworths which was built on the corner of Smith and Knuckey streets.

== Politician ==
In 1959, a Darwin City Council by-election for the Fannie Bay Ward gave Chan his first chance at politics, he won by a large margin. After working hard for the ward, the ward system was abolished in 1962. He decided to run for the Fannie Bay Electorate in 1962 for the 8th Legislative Council defeating four other candidates in an electorate of few Chinese voters thus establishing a great advertisement for the racial tolerance that was a feature of Darwin in those days. Chan was first elected President of the 9th Northern Territory Legislative Council in 1965 which he held until his death. During his time as president he also held the role of Mayor of Darwin from 1966 to 1969.

Chan presided over Darwin's centenary committee, established to commemorate George Goyder's landing at Port Darwin in 1869. In an interview with The Australian Women's Weekly, he stated his hopes that a university could be established at East Point. He also stated that he had received support from the city council for a meditation centre to be established on the site of Darwin's former Chinatown.

== Other links ==
Harry Chan. Territory Stories, Northern Territory Library.
