= Ron Withnall =

Australian politician and lawyer

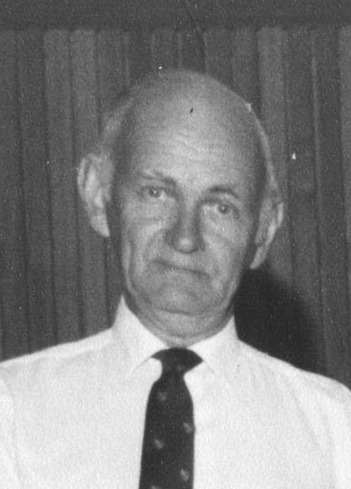
- Withnall in 1976

Member of the Northern Territory Legislative Assembly for Port Darwin
- In office 19 October 1974 – 12 August 1977
- Preceded by: Division created
- Succeeded by: Tom Harris

Personal details
- Born: 9 September 1914 Townsville, Queensland, Australia
- Died: 19 September 1990 (aged 76) Darwin, Northern Territory, Australia
- Party: Country Liberal Party
- Profession: Lawyer

Ronald John Withnall AM (9 September 1914 – 16 September 1990) was an Australian politician and lawyer.

Northern Territory Legislative Assembly
Years	Term	Electoral division	Party
1974–1977	1st	Port Darwin	Independent

Withnall was born in Townsville, Queensland, but attended school at Canterbury High School in Sydney. He studied law at the University of Sydney and later moved to the Northern Territory. He served as the Crown Law Officer for the Territory for many years. He was also the first president of the Northern Territory Law Society in 1968.

Withnall was appointed to the Northern Territory Legislative Council in 1960 in his capacity as Crown Law Officer. In 1966, he contested and won an elected seat in the Legislative Council. Among Withnall's votes as an elected member included voting against the abolition of capital punishment and opposing women jurors, stating that the latter would happen "over my dead body".

As a Member of the Legislative Council, Withnall made a name for himself as a fierce advocate of self-determination, and took part in the campaign which ultimately led to the creation of the Assembly in 1974. He ran as an independent in the seat of Port Darwin in the first elections, and ultimately became one of only two non-Country Liberal Party members (the other being fellow independent Dawn Lawrie) in the first Assembly. However, he was to only serve one term in the Assembly, and was replaced by the Country Liberal Party's Tom Harris.

Withnall died in late 1990, and several condolence motions were presented in the Assembly upon his death. Shane Stone, in his introductory speech upon his election to the Port Darwin electorate in 1990, referred to Withnall as a "fearless and uncompromising advocate of self-government and statehood for the Territory". In 1994, then-Chief Minister Marshall Perron also praised Withnall's role in the Territory's achievement of self-governance. A 1976 interview with Withnall is on file at the National Library of Australia.
