= Alfred Lionel Rose =

Lionel Rose
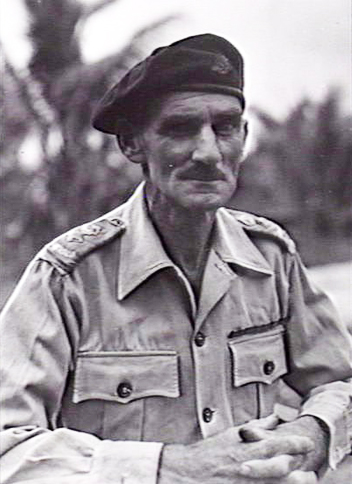
- Lieutenant Colonel A. L. Rose

Member of the Northern Territory Legislative Council for Alice Springs
- In office 8 December 1962 – 30 October 1965
- Succeeded by: Charles Orr

Personal details
- Born: Alfred Lionel Rose; 21 March 1898 New South Wales, Australia
- Died: 2 May 1980 (aged 82) Alice Springs, Northern Territory
- Military career
- Allegiance: Australia
- Branch: Australian Army
- Service years: 1916–20; 1924–46
- Rank: Lieutenant Colonel

Lieutenant-Colonel Alfred Lionel Rose, OBE, AM (21 March 1898 – 2 May 1980), better known as Lionel Rose or Colonel Rose, was an Australian Army officer and veterinarian who served in both World War I and II. He is best known for pioneering the live cattle trade from the Northern Territory to Asia and curing cattle disease.

== Early life ==
Lionel Rose was born in Strathfield, New South Wales. He was the fifth child of Herbert John Rose, a member of the Anglican clergy, and John's spouse Harriett Ethel (née Priddle) Rose. In his formative years, Rose attended Sydney Grammar School.

== Military career ==
Rose enlisted in the First Australian Imperial Force in Sydney on 15 May 1916 soon after his 18th birthday. By September he was promoted to sergeant. He embarked at Sydney on 30 September with the 117th Howitzer Battery on the HMAT Aeneas. He served in France and was wounded in the Second Battle of Arras. He was not seriously affected by his war injuries. Over the years, fragments of shrapnel "worked their way" through his skin at the back of his neck".

On 24 November 1917, Rose was promoted to second lieutenant and fought in France until the end of the war. He returned to Australia on the HMT Morea in October 1919. Rose was discharged from the AIF in April 1920, but remained active in the Militia, Australia's reserve military force, from 1924 serving in the Australian Light Horse.

After the outbreak of World War II, Rose was called up for full-time service on 24 January 1940 to Walgrove Military Camp near Penrith, Sydney. He was promoted to temporary lieutenant colonel of the 21st Light Horse, and he enlisted in the Second Australian Imperial Force on 10 June 1940, accepting a reduction in rank to major. He departed for the Middle East on 5 February 1941. He arrived aboard the Lancashire at Port Taufiq on the Gulf of Suez and entrained for Palestine. He went on to serve in Greece, Cyprus, and Syria before returning to Australia on 14 March 1942. He later served in New Guinea and Borneo. His postings included the 7th Divisional Cavalry Regiment and I Corps headquarters. He regained his rank of lieutenant colonel in 1943, and retired from military service in May 1946.

== Agricultural career ==
After World War I Rose enrolled in veterinary science at the University of Sydney in 1920, against the wishes of his father. He graduated in 1923 and was awarded the W.L. Waterhouse prize for Agricultural Botany. He then took up the position of junior veterinary officer with the Department of Agriculture, New South Wales, commencing duty in January 1924. In 1928 he became the district veterinary officer in Cootamundra.

Upon returning from World War II, Rose joined the Commonwealth Department of Health as chief veterinary officer in the Northern Territory in 1946, a role in which he served until 1958. In June 1947, he set up the Animal Industry Branch (AIB) in Alice Springs. As director, he was the most senior public servant in the region at the time allowing him to select his own staff and live at The Residency, the Government House of Central Australia. The AIB soon developed the reputation of being the most efficient department in the Northern Territory.

During the 1950s, Rose was offered the position of chairman of the newly formed Northern Territory Reserves Board.

Known for his radical behaviour, Rose's most publicised outburst occurred during Queen Elizabeth II's visit to the Northern Territory in March 1963. During the speeches at a Royal luncheon at the Stuart Arms Hotel in Alice Springs, the then Administrator, The Honourable Frank Wise politely tapped his glass with a spoon. The act failed to quiet the crowd, so Rose in his best parade ground bellow shouted "shut up". The incident made the front page of newspapers across Australia the next day. Queen Elizabeth was quoted as saying "it was the shortest and most effective speech" she had ever heard.

=== Contagious bovine pleuropneumonia cure ===
During this period, the contagious bovine pleuropneumonia disease was rampant in the Northern Territory. Rose established a diagnostic and research laboratory at the AIB in Alice Springs and worked to develop a cure. Bovine pleuropneumonia was eradicated in the Northern Territory by 1973.

Rose's management strategy involved separating suspect cattle from those free from disease. He created a protected area of about 3,200 km^{2} extending from Alice Springs into South Australia. Cattle from unaffected areas in the far north and the Barkly Tableland would be driven into Alice Springs where they would be kept in separate yards. At Marree, in northern South Australia, they would be rested and fed separately and joined by suspect cattle from the surrounding region. Once in Adelaide, suspect cattle were slaughtered and disease-free cattle sold on the open market.

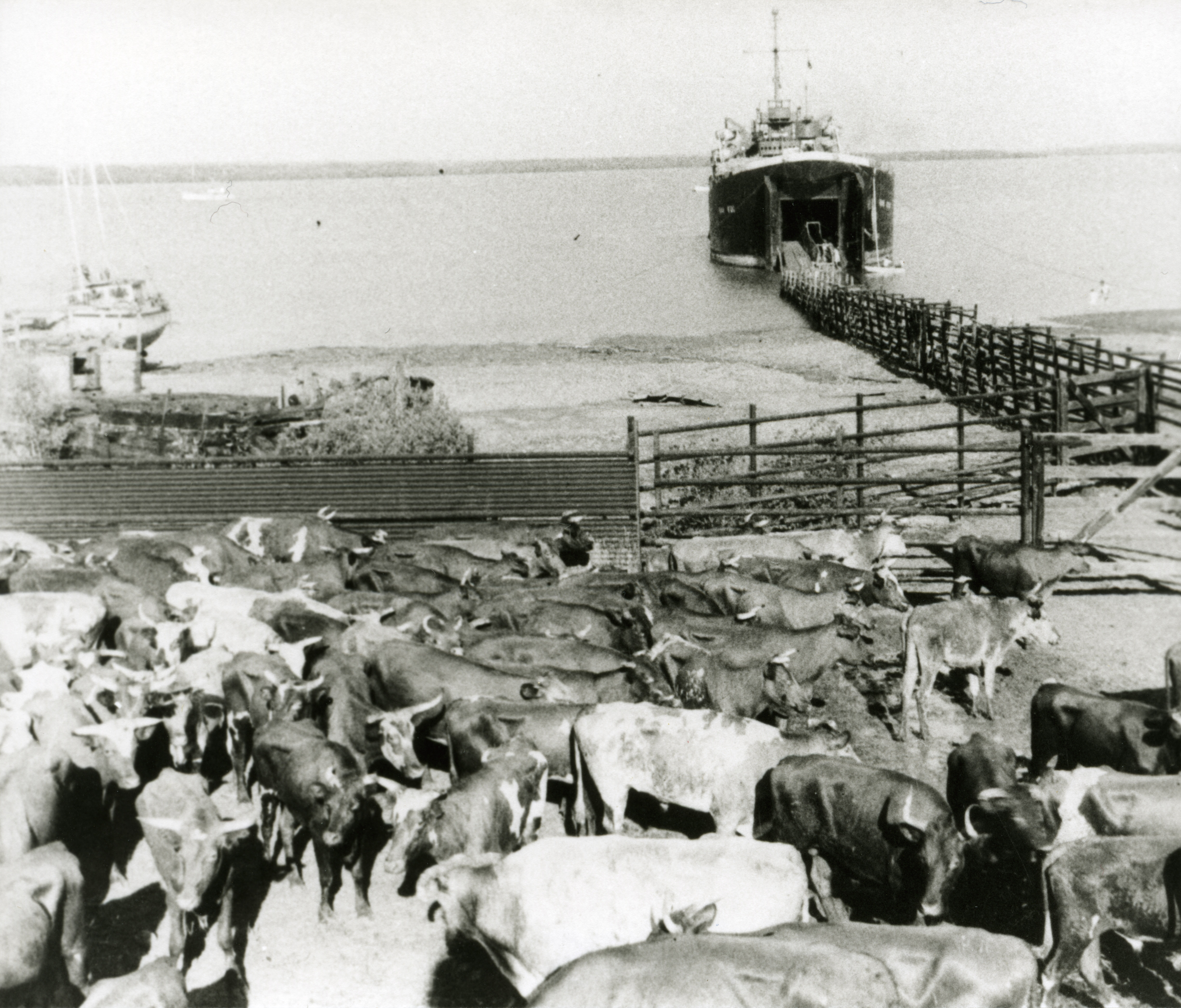
Loading cattle on to the Wankuo at Frances Bay.

Based on its success, a national program was established by a newly established National Committee for the Control and Eradication of Pleuropneumonia in 1959, under the Chief of the CSIRO Division of Animal Health and Production, DA Gill. It defined further infected, protected and disease-free areas. Once these were established, there were restrictions on the movement of cattle between zones. The national program was enforced by veterinary officers, stock inspectors and police across Australia.

=== Live cattle pioneer ===
Northern Territory cattlemen were excluded from a long term meat agreement between Britain and Australia, as their cattle did not meet quality and weight requirements. There were occasional shipments to Hong Kong, Batavia, Singapore and Manila from 1884. While there were over 34,000 head exported in the 1920s mainly to Manila, there is no record of any live cattle trade between 1929 and 1954. After several failed attempts in 1954 and 1955, Rose convinced of the potential of the live cattle market, began experimented with methods of improving cattle condition. He designed the Fort Hill yards in Darwin, and upon opening in 1957, Darwin became the major port for the export of live cattle. Trade resumed in 1958.

== Politics ==
Rose served in the Northern Territory Legislative Council from 1954 to 1958 as a nominated member, and was subsequently elected to the Alice Springs seat in 1962. He "advocated the formation of a party dedicated to Territory interests and development" and in August 1965 established the North Australia Party (NAP). At the time there was no organised opposition to the Australian Labor Party (ALP) in the Territory and the party "appealed to conservative opinion". The party contested the 1965 Legislative Council elections but won only a single seat. Rose was defeated in Alice Springs by 17 votes. He publicly alleged that 50 votes had been "wrongfully and fraudulently" recorded and that the ALP candidate Charles Orr had bribed Indigenous constituents with alcohol. He petitioned the Court of Disputed Returns to overturn the result, but was unsuccessful.

== Personal life ==
Rose married Helen Blaxland at All Saints Church in Woollahra in Sydney on 27 March 1925. They had three children. After divorcing Blaxland in 1950 Rose later married divorcee Nell Hooper, but she died shortly after, on 1 January 1951 in Alice Springs. Rose married his third wife Carmel Mary Kerrison in Adelaide on 4 May 1955. He had three more children with Kerrison, two sons and a daughter.

Rose was known to be an outrageous person who loved to shock people, especially after a few drinks.

== Awards and other recognitions ==
Rose was appointed an Officer of the Order of the British Empire (OBE) in 1947 as commander of the Combined Operations section of the Australian Beach Group in the development of amphibious warfare of I Australian Corps. He was appointed a Member of the Order of Australia (AM) in 1978 and awarded the Gilruth Prize for Meritorious Service to Veterinary Science in 1961.

Colonel Rose Drive, a road in the Alice Springs suburbs of Kilgariff and Connellan, was named in Rose's memory in 1983.
