= Richard Ward (judge) =

Australian politician

Richard Charles Ward QC (28 July 1916 – 24 November 1977), generally known as Dick Ward, was an Australian jurist and politician.

Ward was born in Kew and attended Victoria Street School and Melbourne High School before studying law at the University of Melbourne. Around 1938 he became a partner in a Darwin legal practice, and in 1947 won election to the first Northern Territory Legislative Council, although he did not stand for re-election in 1949. He spent some years in Adelaide before returning to the Northern Territory and the Legislative Council in 1956. In 1966 he was preselected to stand for the Labor Party in the federal seat following Jock Nelson's retirement, but he was defeated by Sam Calder of the Country Party. He returned to the Legislative Council, winning the seat of Ludmilla, which he held until 1974.

In 1974 Ward was appointed to the Supreme Court of the Northern Territory. He died in Sydney in 1977 after a kidney collapse.

== Recognition ==
Dick Ward Drive, which runs between Parap and Nightcliff. was named for him, as were Ward Crescent, Darwin,

(Ward Street in the Victoria/Daly shire was named for Ebenezer Ward, who served under Finniss in the 1864 NT Survey expedition. then Minister for Agriculture and Education in the Boucaut Government. Ward Road in the Litchfield area was named for Mary Alice Ward, teacher and pastoralist who, with her husband, developed Banka Banka cattle station, north of Tennant Creek.)
