= Harry C. Giese =

Australian government administrator (1913–2000)

Harry C. Giese AM, MBE
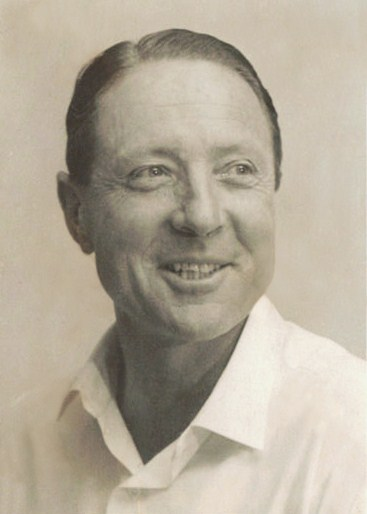
- Harry C. Giese in the 1970s
- Born: 9 December 1913; Greenbushes, Western Australia, Australia
- Died: 4 February 2000 (aged 86); Darwin, Northern Territory, Australia
- Occupations: Government administrator, public servant, and community leader
- Partner: Nancy Giese
- Website: www.harrychristiangiese.com.au

Harry Christian Giese (9 December 1913 – 4 February 2000) was an Australian public servant and community leader. He was the longest-serving member of the Northern Territory Legislative Council, from 1954 to 1973, administering Australian federal government policy for the people of the Northern Territory after being appointed Director of Welfare for the Northern Territory Administration by Paul Hasluck, then Minister for Territories, under Prime Minister Robert Menzies. In 1978, after the NT gained self-government, Giese became the first Northern Territory Ombudsman.

== Early life and education ==
Harry Christian Giese (Harry C. Giese, H.C. Giese) was born on 9 December 1913 in Greenbushes, Western Australia, a third-generation descendant of a German family who migrated to Australia in the 1870s. The family had originally migrated to Clare, South Australia, then Victoria, and then to Western Australia.

Giese attended Bunbury High School, during which time his father was killed by a falling tree when Harry was 14. His mother sold the family assets, and it was thanks to a generous bursary scheme and help from his uncles that Giese was able to attend the University of Western Australia (UWA) in 1932.

He played Australian Rules football for UWA in 1933. Later switching to rugby union, he became a skilled full-back player and went to Ceylon with a combined Australian team. In 1937 he played for a WA team against the South Africa national rugby union team, and in 1946 for a New South Wales country team against the All-Blacks.

== Career ==
In 1954, after senior public service jobs in Western Australia and Queensland, Giese moved to Darwin, Northern Territory as the Director of Welfare in the Northern Territory Administration, after being appointed by Paul Hasluck. The Welfare Branch managed a suite of programs for Aboriginal advancement in health, education, housing, job creation and training, and cultural preservation. Giese saw education as key to social change. He established pre-school and primary school services throughout the Territory, and provided opportunities for secondary and tertiary education, and adult education in parenthood and child care, literacy and Australian society. Welfare Branch officers worked with missionaries, both Catholic and Protestant, in child, family, and social welfare.

Hostels and institutions included Carpentaria Junior Residential College (Church of England), Retta Dixon Home (Aborigines Inland Mission), and Garden Point Mission (Catholic). The Welfare Branch worked with the Retta Dixon Home at Bagot Aboriginal Reserve in Darwin, a home for Aboriginal children, and some mothers. In response to hearing that the older children were not allowed to attend the cinema or social events in Darwin unsupervised, in 1955 Giese asserted that, since they were wards of the state, the government should have a say in what they were permitted to do "as they approach the age where they will need to undertake their own responsibilities". He also recommended encouraging children from the home to join groups such as the Scouts and Girl Guides and Police Citizens' Youth Clubs, now Police and Community Youth Clubs.

Giese remained Director of Welfare until 1970. He was the longest-serving member of the Northern Territory Legislative Council, from 1954 to 1973, pushing through policies that progressively removed legislative restrictions on the rights of Aboriginal people, and moved towards their citizenship and equality with other Australians.

== Contested interpretations ==
Interpretations of post-war Aboriginal affairs are contentious and contested among historians, commentators and ordinary Australians.

Clare Wright in her 2024 book [ ] described events surrounding the 1963 excision from the vast Arnhem Land Reserve of a piece of country on the Yirrkala Methodist Mission, to mine bauxite. She wrote of the “failings” of the Menzies government; of alleged lack of consultation with Yirrkala people, and misunderstanding of their culture and law, leading to the presentation of bark petitions from their leaders to the federal government. She suggested Giese was “the fall guy” of Canberra in negotiating mining agreements.

Robert Porter presents a different view. [ ] He wrote that history is “more than a situation where one group of people is cheated of part of their heritage by a cluster of villains”: a government minister, bureaucrats and mining operatives, “with the collusion of missionaries”.

Ted Evans, Chief Welfare Officer of the Northern Territory Administration’s Welfare Branch, who had worked on the ground in Arnhem Land since 1946, described how, between 1961 and 1963, he had spent much time on the Gove Peninsula, speaking in their own languages with Aboriginal people, to “ensure that they fully understand the nature and effect on their land of proposed mining”. [ ]

After presentation of the bark petitions, a select committee appointed by the federal government heard evidence from a wide range of witnesses. [ ] Its conclusions recommended safeguards for local people’s rights and security; endorsed future mining, and proposed that the first 150,000 pounds of mining royalties go to local clans, with more to follow.

Subsequent events leading to land rights legislation for Aboriginal people are outlined by Porter. [ ]

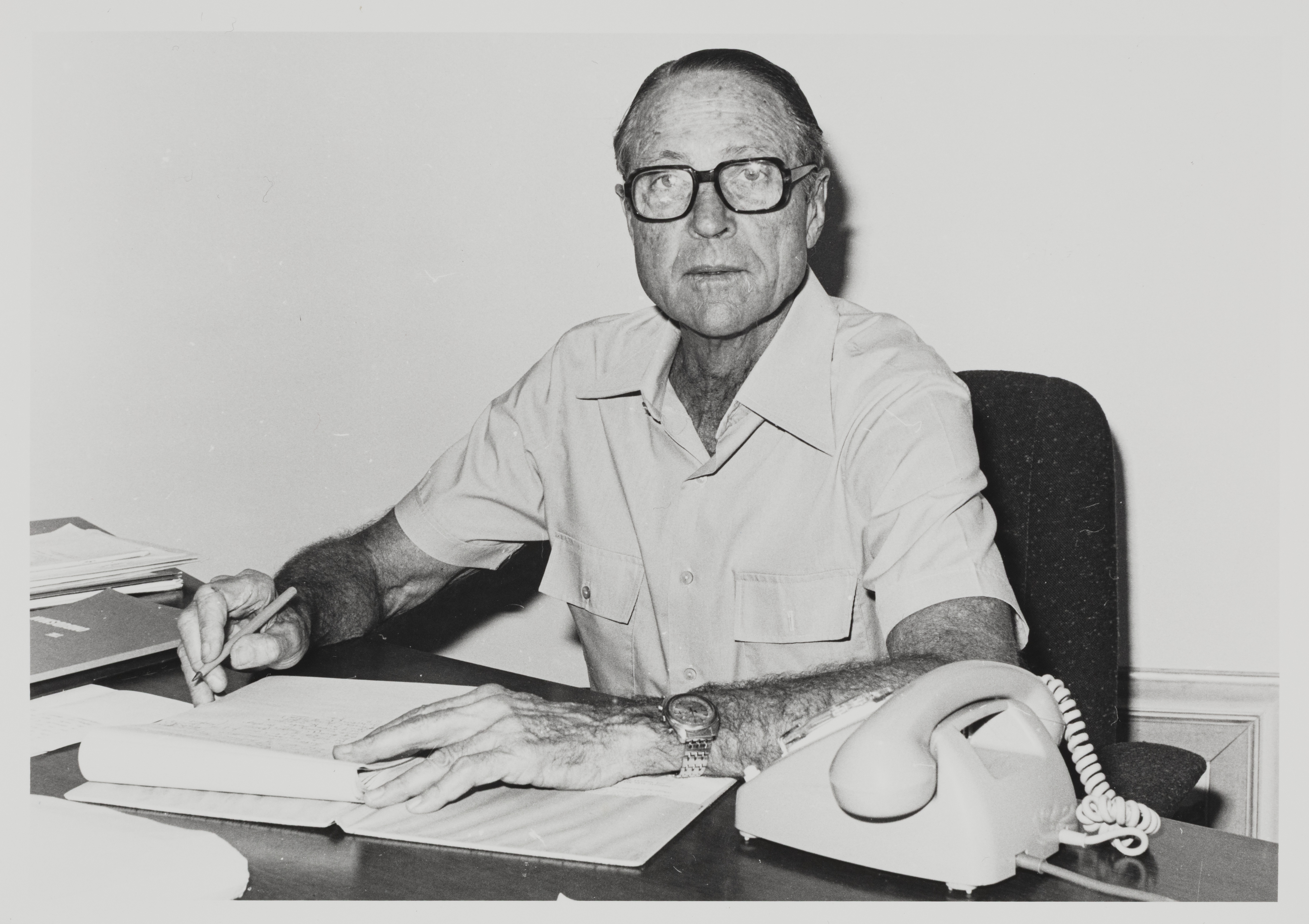
Harry Giese, first Ombudsman of the Northern Territory, 1978

== Community leader ==
After Cyclone Tracy devastated much of Darwin on 25 December 1974, Giese headed the Darwin Disaster Welfare Council.

In 1978, after Territory self-government, he became the first Northern Territory Ombudsman.

Giese was founding president and honorary life member of numerous community service and sporting organizations, including the Royal Life Saving Society Australia, Relationships Australia, NT Rugby Union, Darwin Probus Club, and the Institute of Public Administration Australia.

As Founding chairman of the Northern Territory Committee of the Menzies Foundation, he was instrumental in the establishment of the Menzies School of Health Research, serving on its Board of Governors from 1985 to 1995 and as deputy chairman from 1987 to 1995. His committee brought together as stakeholders the NT government, the Menzies Foundation, the University of Sydney, and the embryonic Northern Territory University, to set up the now-thriving Menzies School of Health Research, which meets the challenges of living in tropical and arid areas and improving the health of Aboriginal Australians. His obituary in the Menzies Foundation Annual Report 1999 said that "the continuing contribution made {by the School] ...to the health of northern Australians is a tribute to the vision, the enthusiasm and the advocacy of Harry Giese, who first identified the need for such a School, and who later vigorously pursued its establishment and strongly supported its work".

== Recognition and honours ==
- 1965: Member of the British Empire (MBE) in 1967.
- 1991: Honorary Fellow of the University of Sydney
- 1997: Member of the Order of Australia (AM)

== Personal life ==
Giese married schoolteacher Nancy (Nan) Wilson at St John's Cathedral in Brisbane on 4 May 1946. She went on to have distinguished career of her own, and the couple had two children.

Giese died on 4 February 2000 in Darwin.
