= Harold Brennan =

Australian politician

Harold Charles "Tiger" Brennan AO (18 June 1905 – 1 January 1979) was an Australian politician. He was a member of the Northern Territory Legislative Council, representing Batchelor in 1955, Elsey from 1956 to 1958, and Victoria River from 1958 to 1961, 1962 to 1969 and 1969 to 1971. In 1962 he urged the Northern Territory to secede from Australia.

Tiger Brennan Drive in Darwin is named for him. He was also Mayor of Darwin 1972–1975.
