= Northern Territory Legislative Council =

Australian territorial legislature, 1947–1974

Legislative Council

Type
- Type: Unicameral

History
- Established: 1947
- Disbanded: 1974
- Succeeded by: Northern Territory Legislative Assembly

Meeting place
- Darwin, Northern Territory, Australia

The Northern Territory Legislative Council was the partly elected governing body of the Northern Territory of Australia from 1947 until its replacement by the fully elected Northern Territory Legislative Assembly in 1974.

Prior to 1947, there had been several attempts by sections of the Northern Territory population to introduce a self-governing body for the region. In 1943, the Minister for External Affairs, HV Evatt (who at that time had responsibility for the Northern Territory) recommended the foundation of a Legislative Council, arguing that Northern Territorians should have the same self-governing rights as those living in Australian administered New Guinea.

In 1947, Prime Minister Ben Chifley government created a 13-member Legislative Council consisting of six elected members and seven nominated by the federal government, including the Administrator of the Northern Territory, who held both deliberative and casting votes. The council could "make Ordinances for the peace, order and good government of the Territory" but could be vetoed by the federal government and had no authority over money matters.

The total enrolment for the 1947 election was 4443, all of whom were white. The Territory was split into five electorates: Darwin, Alice Springs, Tennant Creek, Batchelor and Stuart (see Table for further information).

Electorate	Area	Enrolment	Members
Darwin	Darwin and surrounds	2080	2
Alice Springs	Alice Springs and surrounds	735	1
Tennant Creek	Tennant Creek and surrounds	300	1
Batchelor	All area north of latitude 20 degrees excluding Darwin	915	1
Stuart	All area south of latitude 20 degrees excluding Alice Springs and Tennant Creek	413	1

There were redistributions in 1959 (increasing the number of electorates to eight), 1962, 1965 and 1968 (eleven electorates).

Every candidate at the 1947 election was an independent and it was not until the 1951 election that the Country Party became the first political party to field a candidate. Later the Labor Party ran candidates and usually returned between two and four members at each election, while the North Australia Party formed in 1965 and elected Tony Greatorex, who then joined the Country Party. The longest-serving member of the Northern Territory Legislative Council was Harry C. Giese from 1954 to 1973.

Legislative Council members continued to oppose the federal government's reluctance to grant them more power. The Government believed that the Northern Territory needed to be self-supporting before greater powers could be given. This stand-off led to the elected members resigning their seats en masse in protest in April 1958. They were all re-elected at subsequent by-elections, leading to a promise from the federal government of a new structure encompassing eight elected members, six government appointees and three nominees to be drawn from outside the public service.

In 1962, indigenous people first gained the franchise to vote in Territory elections, although none sat on Council throughout its existence. Previous to this, the only non-white people eligible to vote were Māori. The first Indigenous candidate to stand for the Legislative Council was George Winunduj, who stood unsuccessfully for the Arnhem constituency in 1968.

Further reforms were made in 1965, when the Administrator was replaced by an elected Council President, and in 1968 when the three non-government nominees were replaced by 3 further elected members. However, the Commonwealth still held the right of veto.

In 1973, the Gough Whitlam-led federal Labor government formed a joint committee of parliament to consider the establishment of a Legislative Assembly in the Northern Territory and as a response, the Legislative Council was abolished to make way for a fully elected Legislative Assembly, which held its first election in 1974.
