= Results of the 1987 Northern Territory general election =

Northern Territory general election, 7 March 1987 Legislative Assembly << 1983–1990 >>
Enrolled voters	74,633				
Votes cast	53,127		Turnout	71.2%	–10.4%
Informal votes	2,199		Informal	4.1%	+1.1%
Summary of votes by party
Party	Primary votes	%	Swing	Seats	Change
Country Liberal	20,074	39.4%	–9.4%	16	– 3
Labor	18,307	36.0%	+0.4%	6	± 0
NT Nationals	9,058	17.8%	+17.8%	1	+ 1
Independent	3,489	6.9%	+2.5%	2	+ 2
Total	50,928			25	
Two-party-preferred
Country Liberal		57.3%	–3.8%		
Labor		42.7%	+3.8		

This is a list of electoral division results for the Northern Territory 1987 General Election in Australia.

== Results by electoral division ==
=== Arafura ===
1987 Northern Territory general election: Arafura
Party	Candidate	Votes	%	±%
Labor	Stan Tipiloura	1,211	63.9	+13.1
Country Liberal	Dorothy Fox	402	21.2	−10.6
NT Nationals	Peter Watton	281	14.8	+14.8
Total formal votes		1,894	93.5	
Informal votes		132	6.5	
Turnout		2,026	64.3	
Two-party-preferred result
Labor	Stan Tipiloura	1,286	67.9	+5.9
Country Liberal	Dorothy Fox	608	32.1	−5.9
Labor hold		Swing	+5.9	

=== Araluen ===
1987 Northern Territory general election: Araluen
Party	Candidate	Votes	%	±%
Country Liberal	Eric Poole	871	43.6	−18.1
Labor	Di Shanahan	577	28.9	+11.0
NT Nationals	Enzo Floreani	550	27.5	+27.5
Total formal votes		1,998	97.3	
Informal votes		55	2.7	
Turnout		2,053	77.3	
Two-party-preferred result
Country Liberal	Eric Poole	1,284	64.2	−7.7
Labor	Di Shanahan	714	35.7	+7.7
Country Liberal hold		Swing	−7.7	

=== Arnhem ===
1987 Northern Territory general election: Arnhem
Party	Candidate	Votes	%	±%
Labor	Wes Lanhupuy	742	41.9	−2.0
Country Liberal	John Hancock	412	23.3	−7.6
Independent	Bruce Foley	368	20.8	+20.8
NT Nationals	Brian Dalliston	249	14.1	+14.1
Total formal votes		1,771	92.8	
Informal votes		138	7.2	
Turnout		1,909	62.2	
Two-party-preferred result
Labor	Wes Lanhupuy	976	55.1	+4.1
Country Liberal	John Hancock	795	44.9	−4.1
Labor hold		Swing	+4.1	

=== Barkly ===
1987 Northern Territory general election: Barkly
Party	Candidate	Votes	%	±%
NT Nationals	Ian Tuxworth	729	37.9	+37.9
Independent	Maggie Hickey	581	30.2	+30.2
Labor	Keith Hallett	314	16.3	−23.4
Country Liberal	Gary Smith	301	15.6	−44.7
Total formal votes		1,925	94.4	
Informal votes		114	5.6	
Turnout		2,039	65.8	
Two-candidate-preferred result
NT Nationals	Ian Tuxworth	972	50.5	+50.5
Independent	Maggie Hickey	953	49.5	+49.5
NT Nationals gain from Country Liberal		Swing	N/A	

=== Braitling ===
1987 Northern Territory general election: Braitling
Party	Candidate	Votes	%	±%
Country Liberal	Roger Vale	969	63.5	−14.3
Labor	Mike Alsop	307	20.1	−2.1
NT Nationals	Max Stewart	249	16.3	+16.3
Total formal votes		1,525	96.8	
Informal votes		51	3.2	
Turnout		1,576	64.4	
Two-party-preferred result
Country Liberal	Roger Vale	1,152	75.5	−2.5
Labor	Mike Alsop	373	25.5	+2.5
Country Liberal hold		Swing	−2.5	

=== Casuarina ===
1987 Northern Territory general election: Casuarina
Party	Candidate	Votes	%	±%
Country Liberal	Nick Dondas	1,109	44.3	−21.1
Labor	John Reeves	1,053	42.0	+7.4
NT Nationals	Giuseppe Nicolosi	343	13.7	+13.7
Total formal votes		2,505	96.8	
Informal votes		83	3.2	
Turnout		2,588	81.5	
Two-party-preferred result
Country Liberal	Nick Dondas	1,353	54.0	−11.0
Labor	John Reeves	1,152	46.0	+11.0
Country Liberal hold		Swing	−11.0	

=== Fannie Bay ===
1987 Northern Territory general election: Fannie Bay
Party	Candidate	Votes	%	±%
Country Liberal	Marshall Perron	1,030	47.9	−10.1
Labor	John Waters	614	28.6	−9.8
NT Nationals	Stephen Marshall	334	15.5	+15.5
Independent	Strider	88	4.1	+4.1
Independent	Edward Osgood	84	3.9	+3.9
Total formal votes		2,150	96.7	
Informal votes		73	3.3	
Turnout		2,223	72.7	
Two-party-preferred result
Country Liberal	Marshall Perron	1,362	63.3	+3.3
Labor	John Waters	788	36.7	−3.3
Country Liberal hold		Swing	+3.3	

=== Flynn ===
1987 Northern Territory general election: Flynn
Party	Candidate	Votes	%	±%
Country Liberal	Ray Hanrahan	829	50.6	−17.1
NT Nationals	Jacqueline Anderson	412	25.1	+25.1
Labor	John Omond	399	24.3	−4.9
Total formal votes		1,640	96.7	
Informal votes		56	3.3	
Turnout		1,696	63.7	
Two-party-preferred result
Country Liberal	Ray Hanrahan	1,132	69.0	0.0
Labor	John Omond	508	31.0	0.0
Country Liberal hold		Swing	0.0	

- Two party preferred vote is estimated.

=== Jingili ===
1987 Northern Territory general election: Jingili
Party	Candidate	Votes	%	±%
Country Liberal	Rick Setter	1,108	44.5	−27.3
Labor	Bob Wharton	936	37.6	+9.4
NT Nationals	Harry Maschke	444	17.9	+17.9
Total formal votes		2,488	96.5	
Informal votes		89	3.5	
Turnout		2,577	80.8	
Two-party-preferred result
Country Liberal	Rick Setter	1,429	57.4	−11.6
Labor	Bob Wharton	1,059	42.6	+11.6
Country Liberal hold		Swing	+11.6	

=== Karama ===
1987 Northern Territory general election: Karama
Party	Candidate	Votes	%	±%
Country Liberal	Mick Palmer	1,076	42.7	
Labor	Robyn Crompton	959	38.1	
NT Nationals	Lionel Preston	483	19.2	
Total formal votes		2,518	94.4	
Informal votes		149	5.6	
Turnout		2,667	79.3	
Two-party-preferred result
Country Liberal	Mick Palmer	1,423	56.5	−9.5
Labor	Robyn Crompton	1,095	43.5	+9.5
Country Liberal hold		Swing	−9.5	

=== Katherine ===
1987 Northern Territory general election: Katherine
Party	Candidate	Votes	%	±%
Country Liberal	Mike Reed	858	45.2	
NT Nationals	Jim Forscutt	545	28.7	
Labor	Phil Maynard	497	26.2	
Total formal votes		1,900	96.0	
Informal votes		79	4.0	
Turnout		1,979	73.2	
Two-candidate-preferred result
Country Liberal	Mike Reed	1,062	55.9	
NT Nationals	Jim Forscutt	838	44.1	
Country Liberal hold		Swing	N/A	

=== Koolpinyah ===
1987 Northern Territory general election: Koolpinyah
Party	Candidate	Votes	%	±%
Independent	Noel Padgham-Purich	739	32.6	+32.6
Labor	Peter Ivinson	545	24.0	+0.6
NT Nationals	David Loveridge	497	21.9	+21.9
Country Liberal	Pat Loftus	488	21.5	−41.0
Total formal votes		2,269	98.1	
Informal votes		43	1.9	
Turnout		2,312	78.0	
Two-candidate-preferred result
Independent	Noel Padgham-Purich	1,561	68.8	+68.8
NT Nationals	David Loveridge	708	31.2	+31.2
Independent gain from Country Liberal		Swing	N/A	

=== Leanyer ===
1987 Northern Territory general election: Leanyer
Party	Candidate	Votes	%	±%
Country Liberal	Fred Finch	1,105	43.0	−22.9
Labor	David Lamb-Jenkins	996	38.7	+4.6
NT Nationals	David Wane	471	18.3	+18.3
Total formal votes		2,572	97.1	
Informal votes		77	2.9	
Turnout		2,649	78.2	
Two-party-preferred result
Country Liberal	Fred Finch	1,447	56.3	−6.7
Labor	David Lamb-Jenkins	1,125	43.7	+6.7
Country Liberal hold		Swing	−6.7	

=== Ludmilla ===
1987 Northern Territory general election: Ludmilla
Party	Candidate	Votes	%	±%
Country Liberal	Col Firmin	749	40.8	−17.4
Labor	Chris McMah	449	24.5	−17.3
NT Nationals	Brian Thomas	423	23.1	+23.1
Independent	Sydney Cross	213	11.6	+11.6
Total formal votes		1,834	96.6	
Informal votes		65	3.4	
Turnout		1,899	63.5	
Two-candidate-preferred result
Country Liberal	Col Firmin	1,212	66.1	
NT Nationals	Brian Thomas	622	33.9	
Country Liberal hold		Swing	N/A	

=== MacDonnell ===
1987 Northern Territory general election: MacDonnell
Party	Candidate	Votes	%	±%
Labor	Neil Bell	1,116	72.6	+19.1
Country Liberal	J. Davis	315	20.5	−17.5
NT Nationals	Ron Liddle	106	6.9	+6.9
Total formal votes		1,537	94.7	
Informal votes		86	5.3	
Turnout		1,623	52.2	
Two-party-preferred result
Labor	Neil Bell	1,144	74.9	+15.9
Country Liberal	J. Davis	393	25.1	−15.9
Labor hold		Swing	+15.9	

=== Millner ===
1987 Northern Territory general election: Millner
Party	Candidate	Votes	%	±%
Labor	Terry Smith	1,293	61.9	+9.4
Country Liberal	John Baban	533	25.5	−18.3
NT Nationals	Michael Foley	263	12.9	+12.9
Total formal votes		2,089	97.0	
Informal votes		65	3.0	
Turnout		2,154	72.3	
Two-party-preferred result
Labor	Terry Smith	1,363	65.2	+13.2
Country Liberal	John Baban	726	34.8	−13.2
Labor hold		Swing	+13.2	

=== Nhulunbuy ===
1987 Northern Territory general election: Nhulunbuy
Party	Candidate	Votes	%	±%
Labor	Dan Leo	1,034	45.9	−5.3
Country Liberal	Pam Steele-Wareham	653	29.0	−19.8
Independent	Pat Ellis	429	19.0	+19.0
NT Nationals	Deane Crowhurst	139	6.2	+6.2
Total formal votes		2,255	97.4	
Informal votes		60	2.6	
Turnout		2,315	68.8	
Two-party-preferred result
Labor	Dan Leo	1,351	59.9	+4.9
Country Liberal	Pam Steele-Wareham	904	40.1	−4.9
Labor hold		Swing	+4.9	

=== Nightcliff ===
1987 Northern Territory general election: Nightcliff
Party	Candidate	Votes	%	±%
Country Liberal	Stephen Hatton	1,181	58.5	+4.3
Labor	John Rowell	567	28.1	+14.3
NT Nationals	Brian Brent	272	13.5	+13.5
Total formal votes		2,020	96.2	
Informal votes		79	3.8	
Turnout		2,099	67.7	
Two-party-preferred result
Country Liberal	Stephen Hatton	1,381	68.4	+3.4
Labor	John Rowell	630	31.6	−3.4
Country Liberal hold		Swing	+3.4	

=== Palmerston ===
1987 Northern Territory general election: Palmerston
Party	Candidate	Votes	%	±%
Country Liberal	Barry Coulter	1,429	53.2	
Labor	Tony Henry	821	30.5	
NT Nationals	Michael Ting	438	16.3	
Total formal votes		2,688	97.4	
Informal votes		72	2.6	
Turnout		2,760	81.9	
Two-party-preferred result
Country Liberal	Barry Coulter	1,751	65.1	−6.9
Labor	Tony Henry	937	34.9	+6.9
Country Liberal hold		Swing	−6.9	

=== Port Darwin ===
1987 Northern Territory general election: Port Darwin
Party	Candidate	Votes	%	±%
Country Liberal	Tom Harris	975	53.2	−15.4
Labor	Russell Kearney	509	27.8	−3.6
NT Nationals	James Maclean	350	19.1	+19.1
Total formal votes		1,834	96.6	
Informal votes		65	3.4	
Turnout		1,899	64.0	
Two-party-preferred result
Country Liberal	Tom Harris	1,231	67.1	−0.9
Labor	Russell Kearney	603	32.9	+0.9
Country Liberal hold		Swing	−0.9	

=== Sadadeen ===
1987 Northern Territory general election: Sadadeen
Party	Candidate	Votes	%	±%
Independent	Denis Collins	762	41.3	+41.3
Labor	Meredith Campbell	451	24.4	−5.1
Country Liberal	Shane Stone	396	21.5	−49.0
NT Nationals	Lynne Peterkin	236	12.8	+12.8
Total formal votes		1,845	97.0	
Informal votes		57	3.0	
Turnout		1,902	68.8	
Two-candidate-preferred result
Independent	Denis Collins	1,286	69.7	
Labor	Meredith Campbell	559	30.3	
Independent gain from Country Liberal		Swing	N/A	

=== Sanderson ===
1987 Northern Territory general election: Sanderson
Party	Candidate	Votes	%	±%
Country Liberal	Daryl Manzie	1,086	45.7	−9.1
Labor	Peter McQueen	917	38.6	−6.6
NT Nationals	Lawrence Armstrong	372	15.7	+15.7
Total formal votes		2,375	96.5	
Informal votes		85	3.5	
Turnout		2,460	85.8	
Two-party-preferred result
Country Liberal	Daryl Manzie	1,368	57.6	+3.6
Labor	Peter McQueen	1,007	42.4	−3.6
Country Liberal hold		Swing	+3.6	

=== Stuart ===
1987 Northern Territory general election: Stuart
Party	Candidate	Votes	%	±%
Labor	Brian Ede	698	55.0	−9.3
Country Liberal	Jim Sinclair	261	20.6	−15.1
NT Nationals	Ian Drennan	156	12.3	+12.3
Independent	Vince Forrester	154	12.1	+12.1
Total formal votes		1,269	83.8	
Informal votes		234	16.2	
Turnout		1,514	55.3	
Two-party-preferred result
Labor	Brian Ede	878	69.2	+5.2
Country Liberal	Jim Sinclair	391	30.8	−5.2
Labor hold		Swing	+5.2	

=== Victoria River ===
1987 Northern Territory general election: Victoria River
Party	Candidate	Votes	%	±%
Country Liberal	Terry McCarthy	936	58.4	
Labor	Leon White	466	29.1	
NT Nationals	Ronald Wright	130	8.1	
Independent	Lance Lawrence	71	4.4	
Total formal votes		1,603	94.9	
Informal votes		86	5.1	
Turnout		1,689	65.2	
Two-party-preferred result
Country Liberal	Terry McCarthy	1,072	66.9	+2.9
Labor	Leon White	531	33.1	−2.9
Country Liberal hold		Swing	+2.9	

=== Wanguri ===
1987 Northern Territory general election: Wanguri
Party	Candidate	Votes	%	±%
Country Liberal	Don Dale	1,002	41.3	−15.5
Labor	Peter McNab	836	34.5	−0.2
NT Nationals	Graeme Bevis	586	24.2	+24.2
Total formal votes		2,424	96.2	
Informal votes		95	3.8	
Turnout		2,519	88.0	
Two-party-preferred result
Country Liberal	Don Dale	1,440	59.4	−1.6
Labor	Peter McNab	984	40.6	+1.6
Country Liberal hold		Swing	−1.6	

== See also ==
- 1987 Northern Territory general election
- Members of the Northern Territory Legislative Assembly, 1987–1990
