= Results of the 1983 Northern Territory general election =

Northern Territory general election, 3 December 1983 Legislative Assembly << 1980–1987 >>
Enrolled voters	62,178				
Votes cast	50,716		Turnout	81.6%	+3.6%
Informal votes	1,532		Informal	3.0%	–0.2%
Summary of votes by party
Party	Primary votes	%	Swing	Seats	Change
Country Liberal	28,637	58.2%	+8.2%	19	+ 8
Labor	17,505	35.6%	–3.8%	6	– 1
Independent	2,155	4.4%	–3.7%	0	– 1
Democrats	887	1.8%	+0.9%	0	± 0
Two-party-preferred
Country Liberal		61.1%			
Labor		38.9%			
Total	49,184			25	

This is a list of electoral division results for the Northern Territory 1983 General Election in Australia.

== Results by electoral division ==
=== Arafura ===
1983 Northern Territory general election: Arafura
Party	Candidate	Votes	%	±%
Labor	Bob Collins	930	50.8	
Country Liberal	Robert Woodward	582	31.8	
Democrats	Kevin Doolan	318	17.4	
Total formal votes		1,830	95.3	
Informal votes		91	4.7	
Turnout		1,921	69.5	
Two-party-preferred result
Labor	Bob Collins	1,129	61.7	
Country Liberal	Robert Woodward	701	38.3	
Labor hold		Swing		

=== Araluen ===
1983 Northern Territory general election: Araluen
Party	Candidate	Votes	%	±%
Country Liberal	Jim Robertson	1,268	61.7	
Independent	Goff Letts	420	20.4	
Labor	Allen Joy	368	17.9	
Total formal votes		2,056	98.6	
Informal votes		30	1.4	
Turnout		2,086	89.1	
Two-party-preferred result
Country Liberal	Jim Robertson	1,491	72.5	
Labor	Allen Joy	565	27.5	
Two-candidate-preferred result
Country Liberal	Jim Robertson	1,479	66.2	
Independent	Goff Letts	755	33.8	
Country Liberal hold		Swing		

- Two candidate preferred vote is estimated.

=== Arnhem ===
1983 Northern Territory general election: Arnhem
Party	Candidate	Votes	%	±%
Labor	Wes Lanhupuy	632	43.9	
Country Liberal	David Amos	445	30.9	
Country Liberal	David Daniels	206	14.3	
Democrats	Klaus Rogers	157	10.9	
Total formal votes		1,440	90.5	
Informal votes		152	9.5	
Turnout		1,592	65.0	
Two-party-preferred result
Labor	Wes Lanhupuy	840	58.6	
Country Liberal	David Amos	600	41.7	
Labor hold		Swing		

=== Barkly ===
1983 Northern Territory general election: Barkly
Party	Candidate	Votes	%	±%
Country Liberal	Ian Tuxworth	1,045	60.3	
Labor	Charles Hallett	688	39.7	
Total formal votes		1,733	96.3	
Informal votes		67	3.7	
Turnout		1,800	74.2	
Country Liberal hold		Swing		

=== Berrimah ===
1983 Northern Territory general election: Berrimah
Party	Candidate	Votes	%	±%
Country Liberal	Barry Coulter	1,364	68.7	
Labor	Colin Young	621	31.2	
Total formal votes		1,985	97.3	
Informal votes		56	2.7	
Turnout		2,041	82.6	
Country Liberal hold		Swing		

=== Braitling ===
1983 Northern Territory general election: Braitling
Party	Candidate	Votes	%	±%
Country Liberal	Roger Vale	1,325	77.8	
Labor	Ross Kerridge	377	22.2	
Total formal votes		1,702	97.0	
Informal votes		52	3.0	
Turnout		1,754	79.5	
Country Liberal hold		Swing		

=== Casuarina ===
1983 Northern Territory general election: Casuarina
Party	Candidate	Votes	%	±%
Country Liberal	Nick Dondas	1,449	65.4	
Labor	Lionel Crompton	765	34.6	
Total formal votes		2,214	97.6	
Informal votes		54	2.4	
Turnout		2,268	91.4	
Country Liberal hold		Swing		

=== Elsey ===
1983 Northern Territory general election: Elsey
Party	Candidate	Votes	%	±%
Country Liberal	Roger Steele	978	49.7	
Labor	Trevor Surplice	540	27.5	
Independent	James Forscutt	448	22.8	
Total formal votes		1,966	97.7	
Informal votes		47	2.3	
Turnout		2,013	81.5	
Two-party-preferred result
Country Liberal	Roger Steele	1,294	65.8	
Labor	Trevor Surplice	672	34.2	
Country Liberal hold		Swing		

=== Fannie Bay ===
1983 Northern Territory general election: Fannie Bay
Party	Candidate	Votes	%	±%
Country Liberal	Marshall Perron	1,321	58.0	
Labor	Pam O'Neil	874	38.4	
Independent	Gerald Luck	81	3.6	
Total formal votes		2,276	98.6	
Informal votes		33	1.4	
Turnout		2,308	88.9	
Two-party-preferred result
Country Liberal	Marshall Perron	1,361	59.8	
Labor	Pam O'Neil	915	40.2	
Country Liberal gain from Labor		Swing		

=== Flynn ===
1983 Northern Territory general election: Flynn
Party	Candidate	Votes	%	±%
Country Liberal	Ray Hanrahan	1306	67.7	
Labor	Peter Hughes	564	29.2	
Independent	Pamela Gardeiner	60	3.1	
Total formal votes		1,930	96.7	
Informal votes		65	3.3	
Turnout		1,995	82.4	
Two-party-preferred result
Country Liberal	Ray Hanrahan	1,336	69.2	
Labor	Peter Hughes	594	30.8	
Country Liberal hold		Swing		

=== Jingili ===
1983 Northern Territory general election: Jingili
Party	Candidate	Votes	%	±%
Country Liberal	Paul Everingham	1,577	71.8	
Labor	Martin Jacob	619	28.2	
Total formal votes		2,196	98.5	
Informal votes		33	1.5	
Turnout		2,229	89.1	
Country Liberal hold		Swing		

=== Koolpinyah ===
1983 Northern Territory general election: Koolpinyah
Party	Candidate	Votes	%	±%
Country Liberal	Noel Padgham-Purich	1,397	62.5	
Labor	Robert Wesley-Smith	523	23.4	
Independent	Michael Sanderson	175	7.8	
Democrats	Murray Leeder	139	6.2	
Total formal votes		2,234	98.5	
Informal votes		35	1.5	
Turnout		2,269	86.3	
Two-party-preferred result
Country Liberal	Noel Padgham-Purich	1,566	70.1	
Labor	Robert Wesley-Smith	668	29.9	
Country Liberal hold		Swing		

=== Leanyer ===
1983 Northern Territory general election: Leanyer
Party	Candidate	Votes	%	±%
Country Liberal	Mick Palmer	1,940	65.9	
Labor	John Waters	1,002	34.1	
Total formal votes		2,942	96.6	
Informal votes		105	3.4	
Turnout		3,047	90.8	
Country Liberal hold		Swing		

=== Ludmilla ===
1983 Northern Territory general election: Ludmilla
Party	Candidate	Votes	%	±%
Country Liberal	Col Firmin	1,117	58.2	
Labor	Allan O'Neil	803	41.8	
Total formal votes		1,920	97.3	
Informal votes		52	2.7	
Turnout		1,972	85.3	
Country Liberal hold		Swing		

=== Macdonnell ===
1983 Northern Territory general election: Macdonnell
Party	Candidate	Votes	%	±%
Labor	Neil Bell	749	53.5	
Country Liberal	Ian McKinlay	532	38.0	
Democrats	Ted Hampton	118	8.4	
Total formal votes		1,399	95.0	
Informal votes		74	5.0	
Turnout		1,473	63.8	
Two-party-preferred result
Labor	Neil Bell	824	58.9	
Country Liberal	Ian McKinlay	575	41.1	
Labor hold		Swing		

=== Millner ===
1983 Northern Territory general election: Millner
Party	Candidate	Votes	%	±%
Labor	Terry Smith	1,130	52.5	
Country Liberal	Lorraine Palfy	934	43.8	
Independent	Christopher Fenner	79	3.7	
Total formal votes		2,152	98.4	
Informal votes		36	1.6	
Turnout		2,188	85.7	
Two-party-preferred result
Labor	Terry Smith	1,171	54.4	
Country Liberal	Lorraine Palfy	981	45.6	
Labor hold		Swing		

=== Nhulunbuy ===
1983 Northern Territory general election: Nhulunbuy
Party	Candidate	Votes	%	±%
Labor	Dan Leo	960	51.2	
Country Liberal	Kevin Graetz	916	48.8	
Total formal votes		1,876	97.2	
Informal votes		54	2.8	
Turnout		1,930	77.6	
Labor hold		Swing		

=== Nightcliff ===
1983 Northern Territory general election: Nightcliff
Party	Candidate	Votes	%	±%
Country Liberal	Stephen Hatton	1,069	54.2	
Independent	Dawn Lawrie	613	31.1	
Labor	Colin Dyer	292	14.8	
Total formal votes		1,974	98.7	
Informal votes		27	1.3	
Turnout		2,001	82.7	
Two-party-preferred result
Country Liberal	Stephen Hatton	1,334	67.6	
Labor	Colin Dyer	640	32.4	
Two-candidate-preferred result
Country Liberal	Stephen Hatton	1,143	57.9	
Independent	Dawn Lawrie	831	42.1	
Country Liberal gain from Independent		Swing		

- Two candidate preferred vote is estimated.

=== Port Darwin ===
1983 Northern Territory general election: Port Darwin
Party	Candidate	Votes	%	±%
Country Liberal	Tom Harris	1,510	68.6	
Labor	Russel Kearney	690	31.4	
Total formal votes		2,200	96.4	
Informal votes		81	3.6	
Turnout		2,281	80.0	
Country Liberal hold		Swing		

=== Sadadeen ===
1983 Northern Territory general election: Sadadeen
Party	Candidate	Votes	%	±%
Country Liberal	Denis Collins	1,226	70.5	
Labor	Morgan Flint	513	29.5	
Total formal votes		1,739	97.6	
Informal votes		42	2.4	
Turnout		1,781	82.7	
Country Liberal hold		Swing		

=== Sanderson ===
1983 Northern Territory general election: Sanderson
Party	Candidate	Votes	%	±%
Country Liberal	Daryl Manzie	1,180	54.8	
Labor	June D'Rozario	973	45.2	
Total formal votes		2,153	97.8	
Informal votes		49	2.2	
Turnout		2,202	89.8	
Country Liberal gain from Labor		Swing		

=== Stuart ===
1983 Northern Territory general election: Stuart
Party	Candidate	Votes	%	±%
Labor	Brian Ede	910	64.3	
Country Liberal	Bobby Liddle	506	35.7	
Total formal votes		1,416	95.1	
Informal votes		73	4.9	
Turnout		1,489	64.4	
Labor hold		Swing		

=== Victoria River ===
1983 Northern Territory general election: Victoria River
Party	Candidate	Votes	%	±%
Country Liberal	Terry McCarthy	615	38.1	
Labor	Dennis Bree	425	26.3	
Country Liberal	Ronald Wright	326	20.2	
Democrats	Maurie Ryan	155	9.6	
Independent Labor	Jack Doolan	95	5.9	
Total formal votes		1,616	92.8	
Informal votes		125	7.2	
Turnout		1,741	75.8	
Two-party-preferred result
Country Liberal	Terry McCarthy	1,053	65.2	
Labor	Dennis Bree	563	34.9	
Country Liberal gain from Independent Labor		Swing		

=== Wagaman ===
1983 Northern Territory general election: Wagaman
Party	Candidate	Votes	%	±%
Country Liberal	Fred Finch	1,265	61.1	
Labor	Brian Reid	807	38.9	
Total formal votes		2,072	97.3	
Informal votes		58	2.7	
Turnout		2,130	89.2	
Country Liberal hold		Swing		

=== Wanguri ===
1983 Northern Territory general election: Wanguri
Party	Candidate	Votes	%	±%
Country Liberal	Don Dale	1,229	56.8	
Labor	Pat Burke	750	34.7	
Independent	Edward Miller	184	8.5	
Total formal votes		2,163	98.1	
Informal votes		41	1.9	
Turnout		2,204	86.8	
Two-party-preferred result
Country Liberal	Don Dale	1,328	61.4	
Labor	Pat Burke	835	38.6	
Country Liberal hold		Swing		

== See also ==
- 1983 Northern Territory general election
- Members of the Northern Territory Legislative Assembly, 1983–1987
