= Results of the 1990 Northern Territory general election =

Northern Territory general election, 27 October 1990 Legislative Assembly << 1987–1994 >>
Enrolled voters	82,261				
Votes cast	67,117		Turnout	81.6%	+10.4%
Informal votes	2,081		Informal	3.1%	–1.0%
Summary of votes by party
Party	Primary votes	%	Swing	Seats	Change
Country Liberal	31,758	48.8%	+9.4%	14	– 2
Labor	23,827	36.6%	+0.6%	9	+ 3
Independent	4,410	6.8%	–0.1%	2	± 0
NT Nationals	3,060	4.7%	–13.1%	0	– 1
Greens	1,981	3.0%	+3.0%	0	± 0
Total	65,036			25	
Two-party-preferred
Country Liberal	37,075	57.0%	–0.3		
Labor	27,961	43.0%	+0.3		

This is a list of electoral division results for the Northern Territory 1990 General Election in Australia.

== Results by electoral division ==
=== Arafura ===
1990 Northern Territory general election: Arafura
Party	Candidate	Votes	%	±%
Labor	Stan Tipiloura	1,431	66.5	+2.6
Country Liberal	Barry Puruntatameri	721	33.5	+12.3
Total formal votes		2,152	94.7	
Informal votes		121	5.3	
Turnout		2,273	67.8	
Labor hold		Swing	−6.7	

=== Araluen ===
1990 Northern Territory general election: Araluen
Party	Candidate	Votes	%	±%
Country Liberal	Eric Poole	1,634	57.1	+13.5
Labor	Brian Doolan	702	24.5	−4.4
NT Nationals	Enzo Floreani	527	18.4	−9.1
Total formal votes		2,863	97.5	
Informal votes		73	2.5	
Turnout		2,936	86.2	
Two-party-preferred result
Country Liberal	Eric Poole	2,029	70.9	+6.7
Labor	Brian Doolan	834	29.1	−6.7
Country Liberal hold		Swing	+6.7	

=== Arnhem ===
1990 Northern Territory general election: Arnhem
Party	Candidate	Votes	%	±%
Labor	Wes Lanhupuy	1,103	55.8	+13.9
Country Liberal	Tony Hayward-Ryan	660	33.4	+10.1
Independent	Rod Ansell	213	10.8	+10.8
Total formal votes		1,976	94.6	
Informal votes		113	5.4	
Turnout		2,089	66.2	
Two-party-preferred result
Labor	Wes Lanhupuy	1,210	61.2	+10.9
Country Liberal	Tony Hayward-Ryan	766	38.8	−10.9
Labor hold		Swing	+10.9	

=== Barkly ===
1990 Northern Territory general election: Barkly
Party	Candidate	Votes	%	±%
Labor	Maggie Hickey	1,062	43.4	+27.4
Country Liberal	Paul Ruger	791	32.4	+16.8
NT Nationals	Kenneth Purvis	464	19.0	−18.9
Independent	Tony Boulter	94	3.8	+3.8
Independent	Charles Hallett	34	1.4	+1.4
Total formal votes		2,445	93.7	
Informal votes		163	6.3	
Turnout		2,608	81.1	
Two-party-preferred result
Labor	Maggie Hickey	1,239	50.7	+50.7
Country Liberal	Paul Ruger	1,206	49.3	+49.3
Labor gain from NT Nationals		Swing	+7.5	

=== Braitling ===
1990 Northern Territory general election: Braitling
Party	Candidate	Votes	%	±%
Country Liberal	Roger Vale	1,556	60.9	−2.6
Labor	Matthew Storey	473	18.5	−1.6
Independent	Leslie Oldfield	390	15.3	+15.3
NT Nationals	Damien Ward	138	5.4	−10.9
Total formal votes		2,557	97.8	
Informal votes		59	2.2	
Turnout		2,616	82.6	
Two-party-preferred result
Country Liberal	Roger Vale	1,948	76.2	+3.5
Labor	Matthew Storey	609	23.8	−3.5
Country Liberal hold		Swing	+3.5	

=== Brennan ===
1990 Northern Territory general election: Brennan
Party	Candidate	Votes	%	±%
Country Liberal	Max Ortmann	1,139	44.4	
Labor	Ian Fraser	800	31.2	
Independent	Col Firmin	626	24.4	
Total formal votes		2,565	96.8	
Informal votes		85	3.2	
Turnout		2,650	80.4	
Two-party-preferred result
Country Liberal	Max Ortmann	1,541	60.1	−5.9
Labor	Ian Fraser	1,024	39.9	+5.9
Country Liberal hold		Swing	−5.9	

=== Casuarina ===
1990 Northern Territory general election: Casuarina
Party	Candidate	Votes	%	±%
Country Liberal	Nick Dondas	1,571	56.1	+11.8
Labor	Rod Ellis	1,029	36.8	−5.2
NT Nationals	Lea Rosenwax	200	7.1	−6.6
Total formal votes		2,800	97.5	
Informal votes		71	2.5	
Turnout		2,871	89.5	
Two-party-preferred result
Country Liberal	Nick Dondas	1,721	61.5	+7.5
Labor	Rod Ellis	1,079	38.5	−7.5
Country Liberal hold		Swing	+7.5	

=== Fannie Bay ===
1990 Northern Territory general election: Fannie Bay
Party	Candidate	Votes	%	±%
Country Liberal	Marshall Perron	1,672	58.1	+10.2
Labor	Paul Costigan	772	26.8	−1.8
Greens	Bob Ellis	345	12.0	+12.0
Independent	Strider	88	3.1	−1.0
Total formal votes		2,877	98.4	
Informal votes		47	1.6	
Turnout		2,924	86.5	
Two-party-preferred result
Country Liberal	Marshall Perron	1,727	60.0	−3.6
Labor	Paul Costigan	1,150	40.0	+3.6
Country Liberal hold		Swing	−3.6	

=== Goyder ===
1990 Northern Territory general election: Goyder
Party	Candidate	Votes	%	±%
Country Liberal	Terry McCarthy	1,069	42.7	
Labor	Jack Ah Kit	568	22.7	
Independent	Kezia Purick	330	13.2	
NT Nationals	Ian Tuxworth	238	9.5	
Independent	Thomas Starr	185	7.4	
Greens	Louise Size	116	4.6	
Total formal votes		2,506	96.7	
Informal votes		86	3.3	
Turnout		2,592	83.3	
Two-party-preferred result
Country Liberal	Terry McCarthy	1,644	65.6	+8.0
Labor	Jack Ah Kit	862	34.4	−8.0
Two-candidate-preferred result
Country Liberal	Terry McCarthy	1,355	54.1	
Independent	Kezia Purick	1,151	45.9	
Country Liberal hold		Swing	N/A	

=== Greatorex ===
1990 Northern Territory general election: Greatorex
Party	Candidate	Votes	%	±%
Country Liberal	Robert Kennedy	1,087	39.6	
Independent	Denis Collins	869	31.7	
Labor	Harold Furber	594	21.7	
NT Nationals	David Johannsen	193	7.0	
Total formal votes		2,743	97.4	
Informal votes		74	2.6	
Turnout		2,817	81.3	
Two-party-preferred result
Country Liberal	Robert Kennedy	1,927	70.3	+10.4
Labor	Harold Furber	816	29.7	−10.4
Two-candidate-preferred result
Independent	Denis Collins	1,439	52.5	
Country Liberal	Robert Kennedy	1,304	47.5	
Independent hold		Swing	N/A	

=== Jingili ===
1990 Northern Territory general election: Jingili
Party	Candidate	Votes	%	±%
Country Liberal	Rick Setter	1,731	58.6	+14.1
Labor	Fiona Stuchbery	1,040	35.2	−2.4
Greens	Penelope Thomson	182	6.2	+6.2
Total formal votes		2,953	97.1	
Informal votes		89	2.9	
Turnout		3,042	86.5	
Two-party-preferred result
Country Liberal	Rick Setter	1,749	59.2	+2.6
Labor	Fiona Stuchbery	1,204	40.8	−2.6
Country Liberal hold		Swing	+2.6	

=== Karama ===
1990 Northern Territory general election: Karama
Party	Candidate	Votes	%	±%
Country Liberal	Mick Palmer	1,533	55.3	+12.6
Labor	Margaret Gillespie	1,037	37.4	−0.7
NT Nationals	Janet Durling	200	7.2	−12.0
Total formal votes		2,770	97.0	
Informal votes		87	3.0	
Turnout		2,857	86.1	
Two-party-preferred result
Country Liberal	Mick Palmer	1,683	60.8	+3.6
Labor	Margaret Gillespie	1,087	39.2	−3.6
Country Liberal hold		Swing	+3.6	

=== Katherine ===
1990 Northern Territory general election: Katherine
Party	Candidate	Votes	%	±%
Country Liberal	Mike Reed	1,442	53.2	+8.0
Labor	Phil Maynard	586	21.6	−4.6
NT Nationals	Jim Forscutt	539	19.9	−8.8
Independent	Laurie Hughes	145	5.3	+5.3
Total formal votes		2,712	98.3	
Informal votes		47	1.7	
Turnout		2,759	82.5	
Two-party-preferred result
Country Liberal	Mike Reed	1,926	71.0	+15.1
Labor	Phil Maynard	786	29.0	+29.0
Country Liberal hold		Swing	N/A	

=== Leanyer ===
1990 Northern Territory general election: Leanyer
Party	Candidate	Votes	%	±%
Country Liberal	Fred Finch	1,638	58.5	+15.5
Labor	Jim Davidson	1,002	35.8	−2.9
NT Nationals	Alan MacKenzie	158	5.6	−12.7
Total formal votes		2,798	97.9	
Informal votes		61	2.1	
Turnout		2,859	87.9	
Two-party-preferred result
Country Liberal	Fred Finch	1,733	61.9	+5.6
Labor	Jim Davidson	1,065	38.1	−5.6
Country Liberal hold		Swing	+5.6	

=== MacDonnell ===
1990 Northern Territory general election: MacDonnell
Party	Candidate	Votes	%	±%
Labor	Neil Bell	1,131	53.2	
Country Liberal	Brendan Heenan	542	25.5	
Country Liberal	Alison Hunt	453	21.3	
Total formal votes		2,126	94.8	
Informal votes		116	5.2	
Turnout		2,242	69.1	
Two-party-preferred result
Labor	Neil Bell	1,351	63.5	−1.8
Country Liberal	Brendan Heenan	775	36.5	+1.8
Labor hold		Swing	−1.8	

=== Millner ===
1990 Northern Territory general election: Millner
Party	Candidate	Votes	%	±%
Labor	Terry Smith	1,570	56.7	
Country Liberal	Janice Collins	1,198	43.3	
Total formal votes		2,768	96.7	
Informal votes		93	3.3	
Turnout		2,861	84.7	
Labor hold		Swing	−1.9	

=== Nelson ===
1990 Northern Territory general election: Nelson
Party	Candidate	Votes	%	±%
Independent	Noel Padgham-Purich	1,207	41.0	
Country Liberal	David Sanderson	965	32.8	
Labor	Peter Ivinson	589	20.0	
NT Nationals	Graeme Gow	181	6.2	
Total formal votes		2,942	98.3	
Informal votes		52	1.7	
Turnout		2,994	89.9	
Two-party-preferred result
Country Liberal	David Sanderson	2,173	73.9	+5.1
Labor	Peter Ivinson	769	26.1	−5.1
Two-candidate-preferred result
Independent	Noel Padgham-Purich	1,873	63.7	
Country Liberal	David Sanderson	1,069	36.3	
Independent hold		Swing	N/A	

=== Nhulunbuy ===
1990 Northern Territory general election: Nhulunbuy
Party	Candidate	Votes	%	±%
Labor	Syd Stirling	1,395	59.1	+13.2
Country Liberal	Susan McClure	964	40.9	+11.9
Total formal votes		2,359	96.1	
Informal votes		97	3.9	
Turnout		2,456	76.8	
Labor hold		Swing	−0.8	

=== Nightcliff ===
1990 Northern Territory general election: Nightcliff
Party	Candidate	Votes	%	±%
Country Liberal	Stephen Hatton	1,573	60.4	+1.9
Labor	David Pettigrew	595	22.8	−5.1
Greens	John Dunham	436	16.7	+16.7
Total formal votes		2,604	97.5	
Informal votes		68	2.5	
Turnout		2,672	81.6	
Two-party-preferred result
Country Liberal	Stephen Hatton	1,617	62.1	−3.0
Labor	David Pettigrew	987	37.9	+3.0
Country Liberal hold		Swing	−3.0	

=== Palmerston ===
1990 Northern Territory general election: Palmerston
Party	Candidate	Votes	%	±%
Country Liberal	Barry Coulter	1,382	57.1	+3.9
Labor	Chris Draffin	763	31.5	+1.0
Greens	Timothy Fowler	144	6.0	+6.0
NT Nationals	Ronald Wright	131	5.4	−10.9
Total formal votes		2,420	96.8	
Informal votes		79	3.2	
Turnout		2,499	83.6	
Two-party-preferred result
Country Liberal	Barry Coulter	1,494	61.7	+0.2
Labor	Chris Draffin	926	38.3	−0.2
Country Liberal hold		Swing	+0.2	

=== Port Darwin ===
1990 Northern Territory general election: Port Darwin
Party	Candidate	Votes	%	±%
Country Liberal	Shane Stone	1,436	53.5	+0.3
Labor	Peter Cavanagh	588	21.9	−5.9
Greens	Jessie Kearney	568	21.2	+21.2
NT Nationals	David Fuller	91	3.4	−15.7
Total formal votes		2,683	98.0	
Informal votes		56	2.0	
Turnout		2,739	82.4	
Two-party-preferred result
Country Liberal	Shane Stone	1,654	61.6	−5.8
Labor	Peter Cavanagh	1,029	38.4	+5.8
Country Liberal hold		Swing	−5.8	

=== Sanderson ===
1990 Northern Territory general election: Sanderson
Party	Candidate	Votes	%	±%
Country Liberal	Daryl Manzie	1,547	53.9	+8.2
Labor	Alan Perrin	906	31.5	−7.1
Independent	Andrew Wrenn	229	8.0	+8.0
Greens	Graeme Parsons	190	6.6	+6.6
Total formal votes		2,872	98.2	
Informal votes		52	1.8	
Turnout		2,924	86.9	
Two-party-preferred result
Country Liberal	Daryl Manzie	1,675	59.0	+1.5
Labor	Alan Perrin	1,117	41.0	−1.5
Country Liberal hold		Swing	+1.5	

=== Stuart ===
1990 Northern Territory general election: Stuart
Party	Candidate	Votes	%	±%
Labor	Brian Ede	1,186	54.6	
Country Liberal	Eric Pananka	537	24.7	
Country Liberal	Alexander Nelson	450	20.7	
Total formal votes		2,173	94.8	
Informal votes		120	5.2	
Turnout		2,293	72.0	
Two-party-preferred result
Labor	Brian Ede	1,456	67.0	+5.9
Country Liberal	Eric Pananka	717	33.0	−5.9
Labor hold		Swing	+5.9	

=== Victoria River ===
1990 Northern Territory general election: Victoria River
Party	Candidate	Votes	%	±%
Labor	Gary Cartwright	1,252	51.5	+11.0
Country Liberal	Stephen Dunham	1,181	48.5	−11.0
Total formal votes		2,433	97.0	
Informal votes		74	3.0	
Turnout		2,507	73.6	
Labor gain from Country Liberal		Swing	+11.5	

=== Wanguri ===
1990 Northern Territory general election: Wanguri
Party	Candidate	Votes	%	±%
Labor	John Bailey	1,653	56.2	
Country Liberal	John Hare	1,286	43.8	
Total formal votes		2,939	96.8	
Informal votes		98	3.2	
Turnout		3,037	89.0	
Labor hold		Swing	+0.8	

== See also ==
- 1990 Northern Territory general election
- Members of the Northern Territory Legislative Assembly, 1990–1994
