= Members of the Northern Territory Legislative Assembly, 1983–1987 =

This is a list of members of the Northern Territory Legislative Assembly from 1983 to 1987.

Name	Party	Electorate	Years in office
Neil Bell	Labor	MacDonnell	1981–1997
Bob Collins	Labor	Arafura	1977–1987
Denis Collins	Country Liberal	Sadadeen	1980–1994
Hon Barry Coulter	Country Liberal	Berrimah	1983–1999
Hon Don Dale	Country Liberal	Wanguri	1983–1989
Hon Nick Dondas	Country Liberal	Casuarina	1974–1994
Brian Ede	Labor	Stuart	1983–1996
Paul Everingham ^{[1]}	Country Liberal	Jingili	1974–1984
Fred Finch	Country Liberal	Wagaman	1983–1997
Col Firmin	Country Liberal	Ludmilla	1983–1990
Hon Ray Hanrahan	Country Liberal	Flynn	1983–1988
Hon Tom Harris	Country Liberal	Port Darwin	1977–1990
Hon Stephen Hatton	Country Liberal	Nightcliff	1983–2001
Wes Lanhupuy	Labor	Arnhem	1983–1995
Dan Leo	Labor	Nhulunbuy	1980–1990
Hon Daryl Manzie	Country Liberal	Sanderson	1983–2001
Hon Terry McCarthy	Country Liberal	Victoria River	1983–2001
Noel Padgham-Purich	Country Liberal	Koolpinyah	1977–1997
Mick Palmer	Country Liberal	Leanyer	1983–2001
Marshall Perron	Country Liberal	Fannie Bay	1974–1995
Eric Poole ^{[2]}	Country Liberal	Araluen	1986–2001
Jim Robertson ^{[2]}	Country Liberal	Araluen	1974–1986
Rick Setter ^{[1]}	Country Liberal	Jingili	1984–1997
Terry Smith	Labor	Millner	1981–1991
Roger Steele	Country Liberal	Elsey	1974–1987
Ian Tuxworth	Country Liberal ^{[3]}	Barkly	1974–1990
Ian Tuxworth	Independent	Barkly	1974–1990
Ian Tuxworth	Nationals	Barkly	1974–1990
Roger Vale	Country Liberal	Braitling	1974–1994

^{1} CLP member Paul Everingham resigned on 22 October 1984 to contest the House of Representatives seat of Northern Territory; CLP candidate Rick Setter won the resulting by-election on 15 December 1984.
^{2} CLP member Jim Robertson resigned on 27 March 1986; CLP candidate Eric Poole won the resulting by-election on 19 April 1986.
^{3} CLP member Ian Tuxworth was sacked from the Country Liberal Party on 9 December 1986. He spent two weeks as an independent member before announcing on 23 December that he would be joining the new Northern Territory Nationals party and serving as their leader.

== See also ==
- 1983 Northern Territory general election
