= Stone ministry =

Ministry of fifth Chief Minister of the Northern Territory, Shane Stone

The Stone Ministry was the ministry of the fifth Chief Minister of the Northern Territory, Shane Stone. It was sworn in on 26 May 1995, following the Country Liberal Party caucus' election of Stone as party leader following the resignation of Marshall Perron. It was in office until 8 February 1999, when Stone resigned, and was replaced by the ministry of incoming Chief Minister Denis Burke the next day.

== First ministry (26 May 1995 – 30 June 1995) ==
| Minister | Office |
|---|---|
| Hon Shane Stone, MLA | Chief Minister; Minister for Asian Relations and Trade; Minister for Industries and Development; Minister for Ethnic Affairs; Minister for the Arts; Leader of Government Business (until 19 June 1995) |
| Hon Barry Coulter, MLA | Deputy Chief Minister; Treasurer; Minister for Tourism; Minister for Conservation; Leader of Government Business (from 20 June 1995) |
| Hon Stephen Hatton, MLA | Minister for Aboriginal Development; Minister for Lands, Housing and Local Government; Minister Assisting the Chief Minister on Constitutional Development Matters |
| Hon Fred Finch, MLA | Minister for Education and Training; Attorney-General |
| Hon Daryl Manzie, MLA | Minister for Police, Fire and Emergency Services; Minister for Transport and Works |
| Hon Mike Reed, MLA | Minister for Health and Community Services; Minister for Mines and Energy; Minister Assisting the Treasurer |
| Hon Eric Poole, MLA | Minister for Public Employment; Minister for Correctional Services; Minister for Sport and Recreation; Minister for Work Health and Territory Insurance and the Liquor Commission; Minister Assisting the Chief Minister on Central Australian Matters |
| Hon Mick Palmer, MLA | Minister for Primary Industry and Fisheries; Minister Assisting the Minister for Lands, Housing and Local Government on Lands Matters |

== Second ministry (1 July 1995 – 20 June 1996) ==
| Minister | Office |
|---|---|
| Hon Shane Stone, MLA | Chief Minister; Minister for Police, Fire and Emergency Services; Minister for Ethnic Affairs; Minister for the Arts and Museums |
| Hon Stephen Hatton, MLA | Attorney-General; Minister for Education and Training; Minister for Sport and Recreation; Minister for Constitutional Development |
| Hon Barry Coulter, MLA | Minister for Tourism; Minister for Parks and Wildlife; Minister for Racing and Gaming; Minister for the Railway; Leader of Government Business |
| Hon Eric Poole, MLA | Minister for Asian Relations, Trade and Industry; Minister for Regional Development; Minister Assisting the Chief Minister on Central Australia |
| Hon Fred Finch, MLA | Minister for Public Employment; Minister for Health Services; Minister for the Liquor Commission |
| Hon Mick Palmer, MLA | Minister for Transport and Works; Minister for Primary Industry and Fisheries |
| Hon Daryl Manzie, MLA | Minister for Housing; Minister for Local Government; Minister for Aboriginal Development; Minister for Correctional Services |
| Hon Daryl Manzie, MLA | Minister for Housing; Minister for Local Government; Minister for Aboriginal Development; Minister for Correctional Services |
| Hon Denis Burke, MLA | Minister for Power and Water; Minister for Work Health; Minister for Territory Insurance |

== Third ministry (21 June 1996 – 1 July 1997) ==
| Minister | Office |
|---|---|
| Hon Shane Stone, MLA | Chief Minister; Minister for Police, Fire and Emergency Services; Minister for Constitutional Development |
| Hon Mike Reed, MLA | Deputy Chief Minister; Treasurer; Minister for Tourism; Minister for Lands, Planning and Environment |
| Hon Barry Coulter, MLA | Minister for Transport and Works; Minister for the Railway; Leader of Government Business |
| Hon Stephen Hatton, MLA | Minister for Correctional Services; Minister for Parks and Wildlife; Minister for Sport and Recreation; Minister for Ethnic Affairs |
| Hon Eric Poole, MLA | Minister for Asian Relations, Trade and Industry; Minister for Regional Development; Minister Assisting the Chief Minister on Central Australia |
| Hon Denis Burke, MLA | Attorney-General; Minister for Health Services; Minister for Work Health; Minister for the Liquor Commission |
| Hon Fred Finch, MLA | Minister for Education and Training; Minister for Public Employment; Minister for Racing and Gaming |
| Hon Daryl Manzie, MLA | Minister for Mines and Energy; Minister for Power and Water; Minister for the Arts and Museums; Minister for Territory Insurance |
| Hon Mick Palmer, MLA | Minister for Primary Industry and Fisheries; Minister for Aboriginal Development; Minister for Housing; Minister for Local Government |

== Fourth ministry (2 July 1997 – 14 September 1997) ==
| Minister | Office |
|---|---|
| Hon Shane Stone, MLA | Chief Minister; Minister for Police, Fire and Emergency Services; Minister for Constitutional Development; Minister for Public Employment |
| Hon Mike Reed, MLA | Deputy Chief Minister; Treasurer; Minister for Tourism; Minister for Lands, Planning and Environment |
| Hon Barry Coulter, MLA | Minister for Transport and Works; Minister for the Railway; Leader of Government Business (until 12 August 1997) |
| Hon Stephen Hatton, MLA | Minister for Correctional Services; Minister for Parks and Wildlife; Minister for Sport and Recreation; Minister for Ethnic Affairs |
| Hon Eric Poole, MLA | Minister for Asian Relations, Trade and Industry; Minister for Regional Development; Minister Assisting the Chief Minister on Central Australia |
| Hon Denis Burke, MLA | Attorney-General; Minister for Health Services; Minister for Work Health; Minister for the Liquor Commission |
| Hon Daryl Manzie, MLA | Minister for Mines and Energy; Minister for Power and Water; Minister for the Arts and Museums; Minister for Territory Insurance |
| Hon Mick Palmer, MLA | Minister for Primary Industry and Fisheries; Minister for Aboriginal Development; Minister for Housing; Minister for Local Government |
| Hon Peter Adamson, MLA | Minister for Education and Training; Minister for Communications and Advanced Technology; Minister for Racing and Gaming |

== Fifth ministry (15 September 1997 – 31 May 1998) ==
| Minister | Office |
|---|---|
| Hon Shane Stone, MLA | Chief Minister; Attorney-General; Minister for Young Territorians; Minister for Women's Policy; Minister for Statehood; Minister for Defence Support; Minister for Tourism (from 30 January 1998) |
| Hon Mike Reed, MLA | Deputy Chief Minister; Treasurer; Minister for Tourism (until 29 January 1998); Minister for Police, Fire and Emergency Services; Minister for Public Employment; Minister for Industrial Relations |
| Hon Barry Coulter, MLA | Leader of Government Business; Minister for Transport and Infrastructure Development; Minister for Territory Ports; Minister for the AustralAsia Railway |
| Hon Denis Burke, MLA | Minister for Health, Family and Children's Services; Minister for Senior Territorians; Minister for Work Health |
| Hon Eric Poole, MLA | Minister for Resource Development; Minister for Correctional Services; Minister for Essential Services |
| Hon Daryl Manzie, MLA | Minister for Asian Relations, Trade and Industry; Minister for Regional Development; Minister for Arts and Museums |
| Hon Mick Palmer, MLA | Minister for Lands, Planning and Environment; Minister for Primary Industry and Fisheries; Minister for Ethnic Affairs |
| Hon Peter Adamson, MLA | Minister for Education and Training; Minister for Communications and Advanced Technology; Minister for Racing and Gaming; Minister for Sport and Recreation |
| Hon Tim Baldwin, MLA | Minister for Parks and Wildlife; Minister for Aboriginal Development; Minister for Local Government; Minister for Housing |

== Sixth ministry (1 June 1998 – 18 October 1998) ==
| Minister | Office |
|---|---|
| Hon Shane Stone, MLA | Chief Minister; Attorney-General; Minister for Tourism; Minister for Young Territorians; Minister for Women's Policy; Minister for Statehood; Minister for Defence Support |
| Hon Mike Reed, MLA | Deputy Chief Minister; Treasurer; Minister for Police, Fire and Emergency Services; Minister for Public Employment; Minister for Industrial Relations |
| Hon Barry Coulter, MLA | Leader of Government Business (until 15 October 1998); Minister for Transport and Infrastructure Development; Minister for Territory Ports; Minister for the AustralAsia Railway |
| Hon Denis Burke, MLA | Minister for Health, Family and Children's Services; Minister for Senior Territorians; Minister for Work Health; Leader of Government Business (from 16 October 1998) |
| Hon Eric Poole, MLA | Minister for Resource Development; Minister for Correctional Services; Minister for Essential Services |
| Hon Daryl Manzie, MLA | Minister for Asian Relations, Trade and Industry; Minister for Regional Development; Minister for Arts and Museums |
| Hon Mick Palmer, MLA | Minister for Lands, Planning and Environment; Minister for Primary Industry and Fisheries; Minister for Ethnic Affairs |
| Hon Peter Adamson, MLA | Minister for Education and Training; Minister for Communications and Advanced Technology; Minister for Racing and Gaming; Minister for Sport and Recreation |
| Hon Tim Baldwin, MLA | Minister for Parks and Wildlife; Minister for Aboriginal Development; Minister for Local Government; Minister for Housing |

== Seventh ministry (19 October 1998 – 7 December 1998) ==
| Minister | Office |
|---|---|
| Hon Shane Stone, MLA | Chief Minister; Attorney-General; Minister for Tourism; Minister for Young Territorians; Minister for Statehood; Minister for Defence Support |
| Hon Mike Reed, MLA | Deputy Chief Minister; Treasurer; Minister for Police, Fire and Emergency Services; Minister for Corporate and Information Services; Minister for Public Employment; Minister for Industrial Relations |
| Hon Barry Coulter, MLA | Minister for Transport and Infrastructure Development; Minister for Territory Ports; Minister for the AustralAsia Railway |
| Hon Denis Burke, MLA | Minister for Health, Family and Children's Services; Minister for Senior Territorians; Minister for Work Health; Leader of Government Business |
| Hon Eric Poole, MLA | Minister for Resource Development; Minister for Correctional Services; Minister for Essential Services |
| Hon Daryl Manzie, MLA | Minister for Asian Relations and Trade; Minister for Industries and Small Business; Minister for Regional Development; Minister for Arts and Museums |
| Hon Mick Palmer, MLA | Minister for Lands, Planning and Environment; Minister for Primary Industry and Fisheries; Minister for Ethnic Affairs |
| Hon Peter Adamson, MLA | Minister for Education and Training; Minister for Communications and Advanced Technology; Minister for Racing; Minister for Sport and Recreation |
| Hon Tim Baldwin, MLA | Minister for Parks and Wildlife; Minister for Aboriginal Development; Minister for Local Government; Minister for Housing |

== Eighth ministry (8 December 1998 – 8 February 1999) ==
| Minister | Office |
|---|---|
| Hon Shane Stone, MLA | Chief Minister; Attorney-General; Minister for Young Territorians; Minister for Women's Policy; Minister for Constitutional Development |
| Hon Mike Reed, MLA | Deputy Chief Minister; Treasurer; Minister for Tourism; Minister for Police, Fire and Emergency Services; Minister for Public Employment; Minister for Industrial Relations; Minister for Territory Insurance Office |
| Hon Denis Burke, MLA | Leader of Government Business; Minister for Health, Family and Children's Services; Minister for Senior Territorians; Minister for Industries and Business; Minister for Regional Development; Minister for Racing, Gaming and Licensing; Minister for Defence Support |
| Hon Barry Coulter, MLA | Minister for Transport and Infrastructure Development; Minister for Territory Ports; Minister for the AustralAsia Railway; Minister for Essential Services |
| Hon Tim Baldwin, MLA | Minister for Local Government; Minister for Housing; Minister for Aboriginal Development; Minister for Lands, Planning and Environment |
| Hon Eric Poole, MLA | Minister for Resource Development; Minister for Parks and Wildlife; Minister for Central Australia |
| Hon Daryl Manzie, MLA | Minister for Asian Relations and Trade; Minister for Arts and Museums; Minister for Corporate and Information Services; Minister for Communications, Science and Advanced Technology |
| Hon Mick Palmer, MLA | Minister for Primary Industry and Fisheries; Minister for Ethnic Affairs; Minister for Correctional Services |
| Hon Peter Adamson, MLA | Minister for School Education; Minister for Sport and Recreation; Minister for Tertiary Education and Training |
