= Roger Steele =

Australian politician

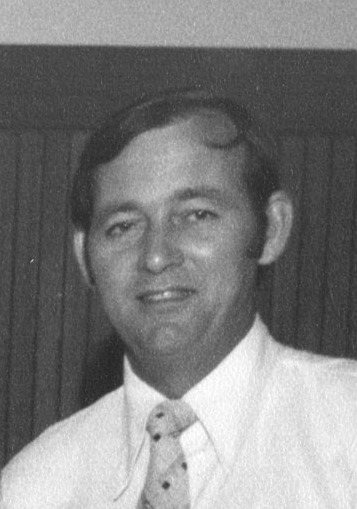
Steele in 1976

Roger Michael Steele OAM (born 29 May 1939) is a former Australian politician. He was a Country Liberal Party member of the Northern Territory Legislative Assembly from 1974 to 1987, representing Ludmilla until 1983 and Elsey thereafter.

Northern Territory Legislative Assembly
Years	Term	Electoral division	Party
1974–1977	1st	Ludmilla	Country Liberal
1977–1980	2nd	Ludmilla	Country Liberal
1980–1983	3rd	Ludmilla	Country Liberal
1983–1987	4th	Elsey	Country Liberal

Steele served as Executive Member for Transport and Industry from 1977 to 1978, Minister for Industrial Development and Minister for Transport and Works from 1978 to 1980, Minister for Primary Production and Minister Assisting the Treasurer from 1980 to 1982, and Minister for Primary Production, Minister for Transport and Works and Minister Assisting the Treasurer in 1982, and Minister for Transport and Works and Minister Assisting the Treasurer from 1982 to 1983.

He was then Speaker of the Northern Territory Legislative Assembly from 1984 to 1986. While Speaker, he was a trenchant critic of Chief Minister Ian Tuxworth, and in May 1986 publicly stated that he believed Tuxworth should and would be ousted by caucus, and that he would resign as Speaker if Tuxworth survived. He did not resign when Tuxworth subsequently won a caucus confidence vote, but stepped down when Tuxworth resigned and was replaced as Chief Minister by Stephen Hatton.

Elsey was abolished ahead of the 1987 election, and Steele nominated for CLP preselection to contest Katherine, essentially the urbanised portion of his old seat. However, he indicated to the preselection committee that he could not guarantee that he would serve a full term if elected. The Opposition Leader, Terry Smith, publicly suggested that Steele had only renominated because this would increase his superannuation. He was one of three incumbent MLAs at that election to be denied preselection by the party's central council; while Noel Padgham-Purich and Denis Collins were re-elected as independents, Steele retired and publicly campaigned for his endorsed successor, Mike Reed.

Northern Territory Legislative Assembly
Preceded by New seat	Member for Ludmilla; 1974–1983	Succeeded by Col Firmin
Preceded by Les MacFarlane	Member for Elsey; 1983–1987	Succeeded by Seat abolished
Preceded by Les MacFarlane	Speaker of the Northern Territory Legislative Assembly; 1984–1986	Succeeded by Roger Vale
