= 1987 Northern Territory general election =

Australian Regional Election

- 7 March 1987

All 25 seats of the Northern Territory Legislative Assembly 13 seats needed for a majority
- Turnout: 71.2 (▼10.4 pp)
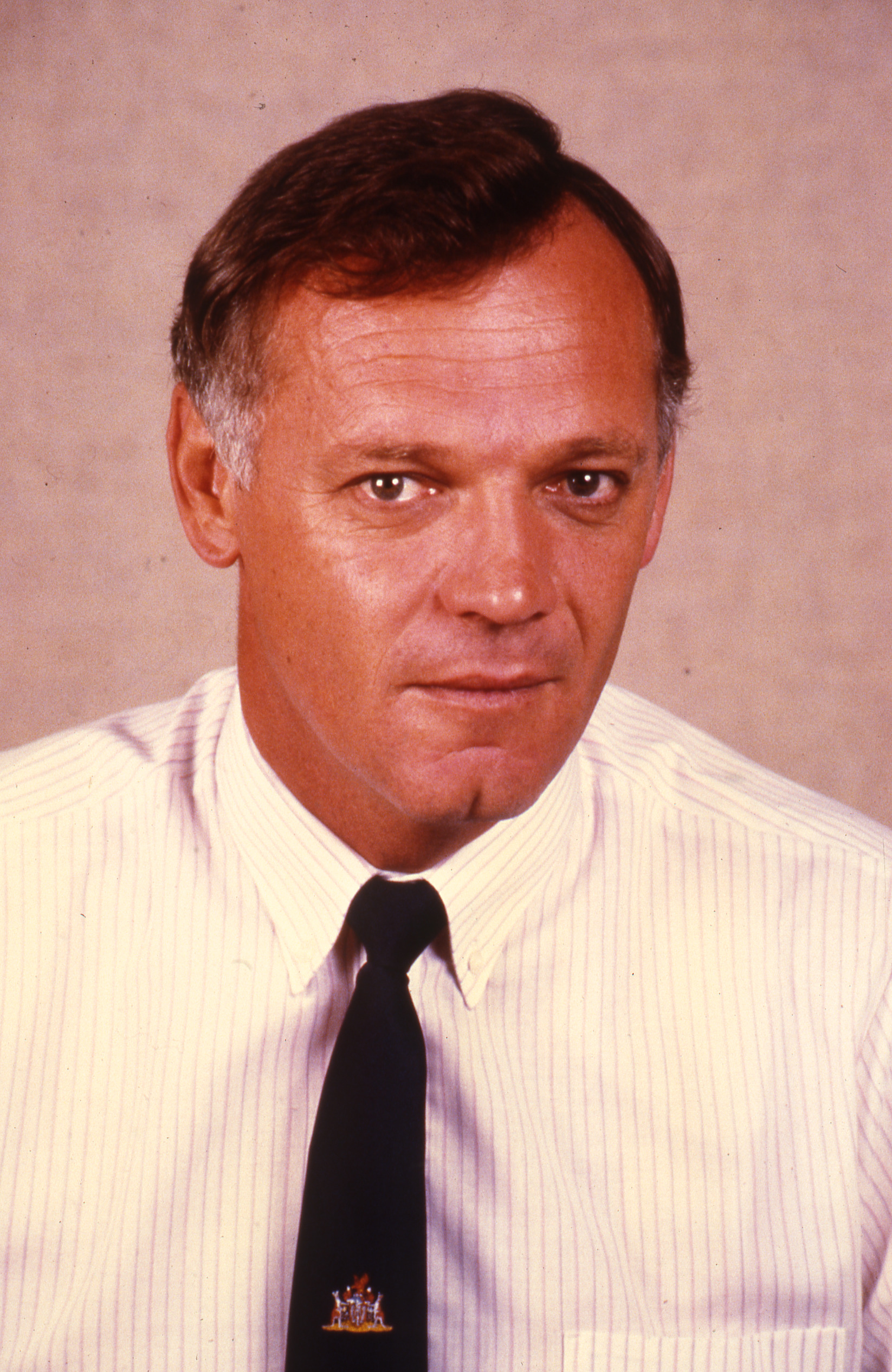

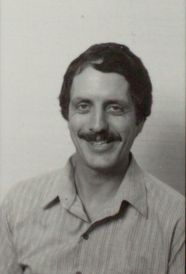

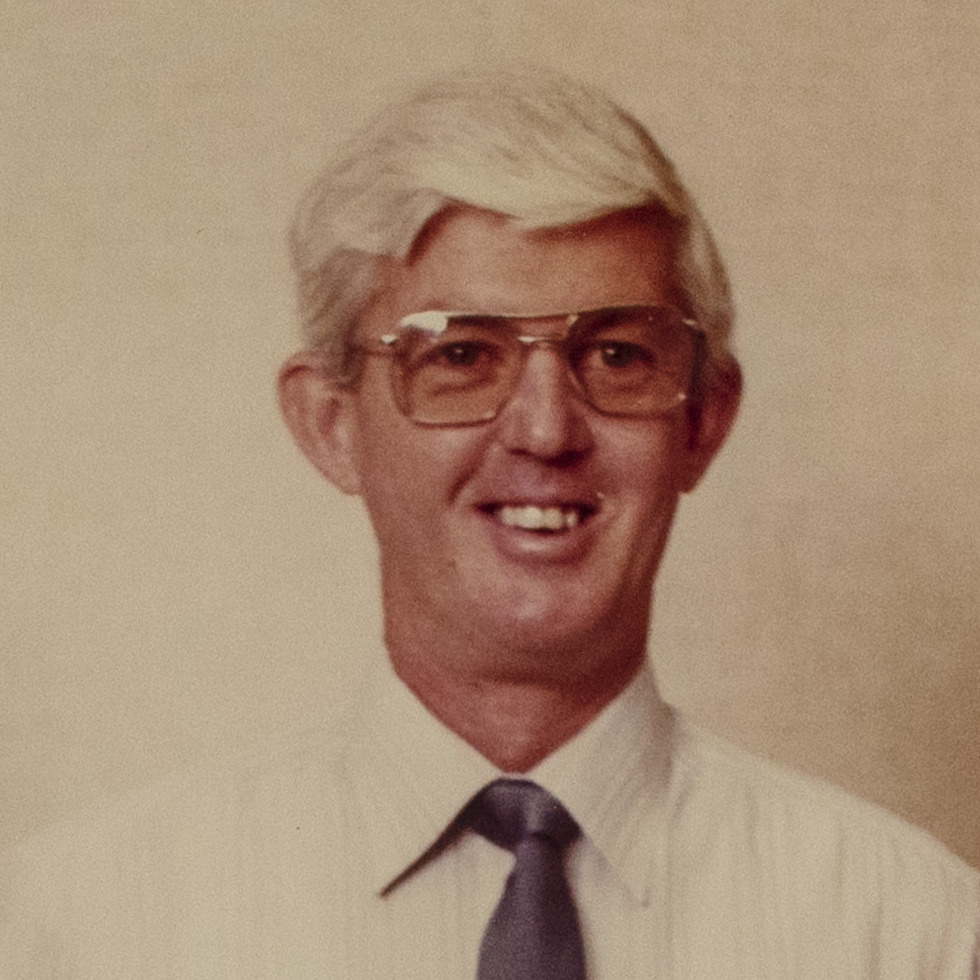
	First party	Second party	Third party
Leader	Stephen Hatton	Terry Smith	Ian Tuxworth
Party	Country Liberal	Labor	Nationals
Leader since	14 May 1986	19 August 1986	21 December 1986
Leader's seat	Nightcliff	Millner	Barkly
Last election	19 seats	6 seats	Did not exist
Seats won	16	6	1
Seat change	▼3	Steady	New
Popular vote	20,074	18,307	9,058
Percentage	39.4%	36.0%	17.1%
Swing	▼18.8	▲0.4	New
TPP	57.3%	42.7%
TPP swing	▼3.8	▲3.8
Chief Minister before election
Stephen Hatton
Country Liberal
Elected Chief Minister
Stephen Hatton
Country Liberal

A general election was held in the Northern Territory, Australia on Saturday 7 March 1987. Although the incumbent Country Liberal Party (CLP) won a majority under new leader Stephen Hatton, the party's vote was down almost 20 percentage points.

At the 1987 election, the CLP faced a challenge from the Northern Territory Nationals, a rebel conservative party led by former CLP Chief Minister Ian Tuxworth that was aligned with then-Queensland Premier Joh Bjelke-Petersen, but not affiliated with the federal National Party of Australia. The NT Nationals took 17.79% of the primary vote, mostly from the CLP, but finished with only one member in the assembly. Hatton, despite a loss of three seats, retained a working majority.

Labor's vote remained virtually unchanged. As in 1983, its assembly tally was six.

Two former-CLP independents were re-elected in their seats. Noel Padgham-Purich was re-elected to Koolpinyah, while Denis Collins was re-elected to Sadadeen as an independent. Former Chief Minister Ian Tuxworth was also re-elected as a member of the NT Nationals.

Ian Tuxworth's election to the seat of Barkly was declared void after independent candidate Maggie Hickey challenged the result on the basis that the Labor candidate, Keith Hallet, held British nationality and was not an Australian citizen. Due to the close result (Tuxworth had won by only 19 votes), Justice John Nader voided the election on 30 July 1987, and a by-election was held on 5 September 1987, at which Tuxworth regained the seat.

== Results ==
↓
16	1	2	6
CLP	Nat	Ind	Labor

Summary of the results of the 1987 Northern Territory general election, Legislative Assembly
Party	Votes	%	+/–	Seats	+/–
Country Liberal	20,074	39.42	▼18.80	16	▼3
Labor	18,307	35.95	▲0.36	6	Steady
NT Nationals	9,058	17.79	New	1	New
Independents	3,489	6.85	▲2.47	2	▲2
Total	50,928	100.00	–	25	–
Valid votes	50,928	95.86			
Invalid/blank votes	2,199	4.14	▲1.12		
Total votes	53,127	100.00	–		
Registered voters/turnout	74,633	71.18	▼10.39		
Country Liberal		57.3			
Labor		42.7			
Total					

Popular vote
Country Liberal	37.94%
Labor	34.60%
NT Nationals	17.12%
Independents	6.59%

Two-party-preferred vote
Country Liberal	57.30%
Labor	42.70%

Seats
Country Liberal	64.00%
Labor	24.00%
NT Nationals	4.00%
Independents	8.00%

== Retiring MPs ==
=== Labor ===
- Bob Collins MLA (Arafura)

=== Country Liberal ===
- Roger Steele MLA (Elsey)

== Candidates ==
Sitting members are listed in bold. Successful candidates are highlighted in the relevant colour.

Electorate	Held by	Labor	CLP	Nationals	Independent
Arafura	Labor	Stan Tipiloura	Dorothy Fox	Peter Watton	
Araluen	CLP	Di Shanahan	**Eric Poole**	Enzo Floreani	
Arnhem	Labor	**Wes Lanhupuy**	John Hancock	Brian Dalliston	Bruce Foley
Barkly	CLP	Keith Hallett	Gary Smith	**Ian Tuxworth**	Maggie Hickey
Braitling	CLP	Mike Alsop	**Roger Vale**	Max Stewart	
Casuarina	CLP	John Reeves	**Nick Dondas**	Giuseppe Nicolosi	
Fannie Bay	CLP	John Waters	**Marshall Perron**	Stephen Marshall	Edward Osgood; Strider
Flynn	CLP	John Omond	**Ray Hanrahan**	Jacqueline Anderson	
Jingili	CLP	Bob Wharton	**Rick Setter**	Harry Maschke	
Karama	CLP	Robyn Crompton	**Mick Palmer**	Lionel Preston	
Katherine	CLP	Phil Maynard	Mike Reed	Jim Forscutt	
Koolpinyah	CLP	Peter Ivinson	Pat Loftus	David Loveridge	**Noel Padgham-Purich**
Leanyer	CLP	David Lamb-Jenkins	**Fred Finch**	David Wane	
Ludmilla	CLP	Chris McMah	**Col Firmin**	Brian Thomas	Sydney Cross
MacDonnell	Labor	**Neil Bell**	J. Davis	Ron Liddle	
Millner	Labor	**Terry Smith**	John Baban	Michael Foley	
Nhulunbuy	Labor	**Dan Leo**	Pam Steele-Wareham	Deane Crowhurst	Pat Ellis
Nightcliff	CLP	John Rowell	**Stephen Hatton**	Brian Brent	
Palmerston	CLP	Tony Henry	**Barry Coulter**	Michael Ting	
Port Darwin	CLP	Russell Kearney	**Tom Harris**	James Maclean	
Sadadeen	Independent	Meredith Campbell	Shane Stone	Lynne Peterkin	**Denis Collins**
Sanderson	CLP	Peter McQueen	**Daryl Manzie**	Lawrence Armstrong	
Stuart	Labor	**Brian Ede**	Jim Sinclair	Ian Drennan	Vince Forrester
Victoria River	CLP	Leon White	**Terry McCarthy**	Ronald Wright	Lance Lawrence
Wanguri	CLP	Peter McNab	**Don Dale**	Graeme Bevis	

== Seats changing hands ==
Seat	Pre-1987			Swing	Post-1987		
Seat	Party	Member	Margin	Swing	Margin	Member	Party
Barkly	Country Liberals	Ian Tuxworth	10.3 (CLP)	N/A	0.5	Ian Tuxworth	NT Nationals
Koolpinyah	Independent	Noel Padgham-Purich	12.5 (CLP)	31.3	18.8	Noel Padgham-Purich	Independent
Sadadeen	Independent	Denis Collins	20.5 (CLP)	40.2	19.7	Denis Collins	Independent

== Post-election pendulum ==
The following pendulum is known as the Mackerras pendulum, invented by psephologist Malcolm Mackerras. The pendulum works by lining up all of the seats held in the Legislative Assembly according to the percentage point margin they are held by on a two-party-preferred basis. This is also known as the swing required for the seat to change hands. Given a uniform swing to the opposition or government parties, the number of seats that change hands can be predicted.

Country Liberal seats
Marginal
Casuarina	Nick Dondas	CLP	4.0
Katherine	Mike Reed	CLP	5.9 v NAT
Fairly safe
Leanyer	Fred Finch	CLP	6.3
Karama	Mick Palmer	CLP	6.5
Jingili	Rick Setter	CLP	7.4
Sanderson	Daryl Manzie	CLP	7.6
Wanguri	Don Dale	CLP	9.4
Safe
Fannie Bay	Marshall Perron	CLP	13.3
Araluen	Eric Poole	CLP	14.2
Palmerston	Barry Coulter	CLP	15.1
Ludmilla	Col Firmin	CLP	16.1 v NAT
Victoria River	Terry McCarthy	CLP	16.9
Port Darwin	Tom Harris	CLP	17.1
Nightcliff	Stephen Hatton	CLP	18.4
Flynn	Ray Hanrahan	CLP	19.0
Very safe
Braitling	Roger Vale	CLP	25.5

Labor seats
Marginal
Arnhem	Wes Lanhupuy	ALP	5.1
Fairly safe
Nhulunbuy	Dan Leo	ALP	9.9
Safe
Millner	Terry Smith	ALP	15.2
Arafura	Stan Tipiloura	ALP	17.9
Stuart	Brian Ede	ALP	19.2
Very safe
Macdonnell	Neil Bell	ALP	24.9
Crossbench seats
Barkly	Ian Tuxworth	NAT	0.5 v IND
Koolpinyah	Noel Padgham-Purich	IND	18.8 v NAT
Sadadeen	Denis Collins	IND	19.7 v LAB
