= Electoral division of Berrimah =

Former electoral division of the Northern Territory

Berrimah was an electoral division of the Legislative Assembly in Australia's Northern Territory. It was named after the town of Berrimah. It existed from 1983 to 1987, when it was replaced by Palmerston.

== Members for Berrimah ==
Member	Party	Term
Barry Coulter	Country Liberal	1983–1987

== Election results ==
=== Elections in the 1980s ===
1983 Northern Territory general election: Berrimah
Party	Candidate	Votes	%	±%
Country Liberal	Barry Coulter	1,364	68.7	
Labor	Colin Young	621	31.2	
Total formal votes		1,985	97.3	
Informal votes		56	2.7	
Turnout		2,041	82.6	
Country Liberal hold		Swing		
