= Electoral division of Koolpinyah =

Former electoral division of the Northern Territory

Koolpinyah was an electoral division of the Legislative Assembly in Australia's Northern Territory. It existed from 1983 to 1990 when it was replaced by Nelson.

== Members for Koolpinyah ==
Member	Party	Term
Noel Padgham-Purich	Country Liberal	1983–1987
Noel Padgham-Purich	Independent	1987–1990

== Election results ==
=== Elections in the 1980s ===
1983 Northern Territory general election: Koolpinyah
Party	Candidate	Votes	%	±%
Country Liberal	Noel Padgham-Purich	1,397	62.5	
Labor	Robert Wesley-Smith	523	23.4	
Independent	Michael Sanderson	175	7.8	
Democrats	Murray Leeder	139	6.2	
Total formal votes		2,234	98.5	
Informal votes		35	1.5	
Turnout		2,269	86.3	
Two-party-preferred result
Country Liberal	Noel Padgham-Purich	1,566	70.1	
Labor	Robert Wesley-Smith	668	29.9	
Country Liberal hold		Swing		

1987 Northern Territory general election: Koolpinyah
Party	Candidate	Votes	%	±%
Independent	Noel Padgham-Purich	739	32.6	+32.6
Labor	Peter Ivinson	545	24.0	+0.6
NT Nationals	David Loveridge	497	21.9	+21.9
Country Liberal	Pat Loftus	488	21.5	−41.0
Total formal votes		2,269	98.1	
Informal votes		43	1.9	
Turnout		2,312	78.0	
Two-candidate-preferred result
Independent	Noel Padgham-Purich	1,561	68.8	+68.8
NT Nationals	David Loveridge	708	31.2	+31.2
Independent gain from Country Liberal		Swing	N/A	
