= Electoral division of Ludmilla =

Former electoral division of the Northern Territory

Ludmilla was an electoral division of the Legislative Assembly in Australia's Northern Territory. One of the Legislative Assembly's original electorates, it was first contested at the 1974 election and was abolished in 1990. It was named after the Darwin suburb of Ludmilla.

== Members for Ludmilla ==
Member	Party	Term
Roger Steele	Country Liberal	1974–1983
Col Firmin	Country Liberal	1983–1990
Col Firmin	Independent	1990–1990

== Election results ==
=== Elections in the 1970s ===
1974 Northern Territory general election: Ludmilla
Party	Candidate	Votes	%	±%
Country Liberal	Roger Steele	569	36.4	
Labor	Hazel Robertson	450	28.8	
Independent	Edward D'Ambrosio; Brian Smith; Grahame Stewart; William Sullivan	545	34.9	
Total formal votes		1,564	95.2	
Informal votes		78	4.8	
Turnout		1,642	80.4	
Two-party-preferred result
Country Liberal	Roger Steele	785	57.3	
Labor	Hazel Robertson	586	42.7	
Country Liberal win		(new seat)		

- The number of votes each individual Independent received is unknown.

1977 Northern Territory general election: Ludmilla
Party	Candidate	Votes	%	±%
Country Liberal	Roger Steele	889	46.9	
Labor	Christopher Draffin	745	39.3	
Progress	Terry Johnson	262	13.8	
Total formal votes		1,896	97.7	
Informal votes		45	2.3	
Turnout		1,941	79.1	
Two-party-preferred result
Country Liberal	Roger Steele	1,053	55.5	
Labor	Christopher Draffin	843	44.5	
Country Liberal hold		Swing		

=== Elections in the 1980s ===
1980 Northern Territory general election: Ludmilla
Party	Candidate	Votes	%	±%
Country Liberal	Roger Steele	1,284	58.5	+11.6
Labor	Kay Spurr	739	33.7	−5.6
Independent	Roy Barden	173	7.9	+7.9
Total formal votes		2,196	97.8	
Informal votes		50	2.2	
Turnout		2,246	82.4	
Country Liberal hold		Swing	N/A	

- Preferences were not distributed.

1983 Northern Territory general election: Ludmilla
Party	Candidate	Votes	%	±%
Country Liberal	Col Firmin	1,117	58.2	
Labor	Allan O'Neil	803	41.8	
Total formal votes		1,920	97.3	
Informal votes		52	2.7	
Turnout		1,972	85.3	
Country Liberal hold		Swing		

1987 Northern Territory general election: Ludmilla
Party	Candidate	Votes	%	±%
Country Liberal	Col Firmin	749	40.8	−17.4
Labor	Chris McMah	449	24.5	−17.3
NT Nationals	Brian Thomas	423	23.1	+23.1
Independent	Sydney Cross	213	11.6	+11.6
Total formal votes		1,834	96.6	
Informal votes		65	3.4	
Turnout		1,899	63.5	
Two-candidate-preferred result
Country Liberal	Col Firmin	1,212	66.1	
NT Nationals	Brian Thomas	622	33.9	
Country Liberal hold		Swing	N/A	
