= Electoral division of Sadadeen =

Former electoral division of the Northern Territory, Australia

Sadadeen was an electoral division of the Legislative Assembly in Australia's Northern Territory. It existed from 1983 to 1990 when it was replaced by Greatorex.

== Members for Sadadeen ==
| Member | Party | Term |
|---|---|---|
| Denis Collins | Country Liberal | 1983–1987 |
| Denis Collins | Independent | 1987–1990 |

== Election results ==
=== Elections in the 1980s ===
1983 Northern Territory general election: Sadadeen
| Party | Candidate | Votes | % | ±% |
|---|---|---|---|---|
| Country Liberal | Denis Collins | 1,226 | 70.5 | |
| Labor | Morgan Flint | 513 | 29.5 | |
| Total formal votes | | 1,739 | 97.6 | |
| Informal votes | | 42 | 2.4 | |
| Turnout | | 1,781 | 82.7 | |
| Country Liberal hold | | Swing | | |

1987 Northern Territory general election: Sadadeen
| Party | Candidate | Votes | % | ±% |
|---|---|---|---|---|
| Independent | Denis Collins | 762 | 41.3 | +41.3 |
| Labor | Meredith Campbell | 451 | 24.4 | −5.1 |
| Country Liberal | Shane Stone | 396 | 21.5 | −49.0 |
| NT Nationals | Lynne Peterkin | 236 | 12.8 | +12.8 |
| Total formal votes | | 1,845 | 97.0 | |
| Informal votes | | 57 | 3.0 | |
| Turnout | | 1,902 | 68.8 | |
Two-candidate-preferred result
| Independent | Denis Collins | 1,286 | 69.7 | |
| Labor | Meredith Campbell | 559 | 30.3 | |
| Independent gain from Country Liberal | | Swing | N/A | |
