= 1990 Northern Territory general election =

- 27 October 1990

All 25 seats of the Northern Territory Legislative Assembly 13 seats needed for a majority
- Turnout: 81.6 (▲10.4 pp)
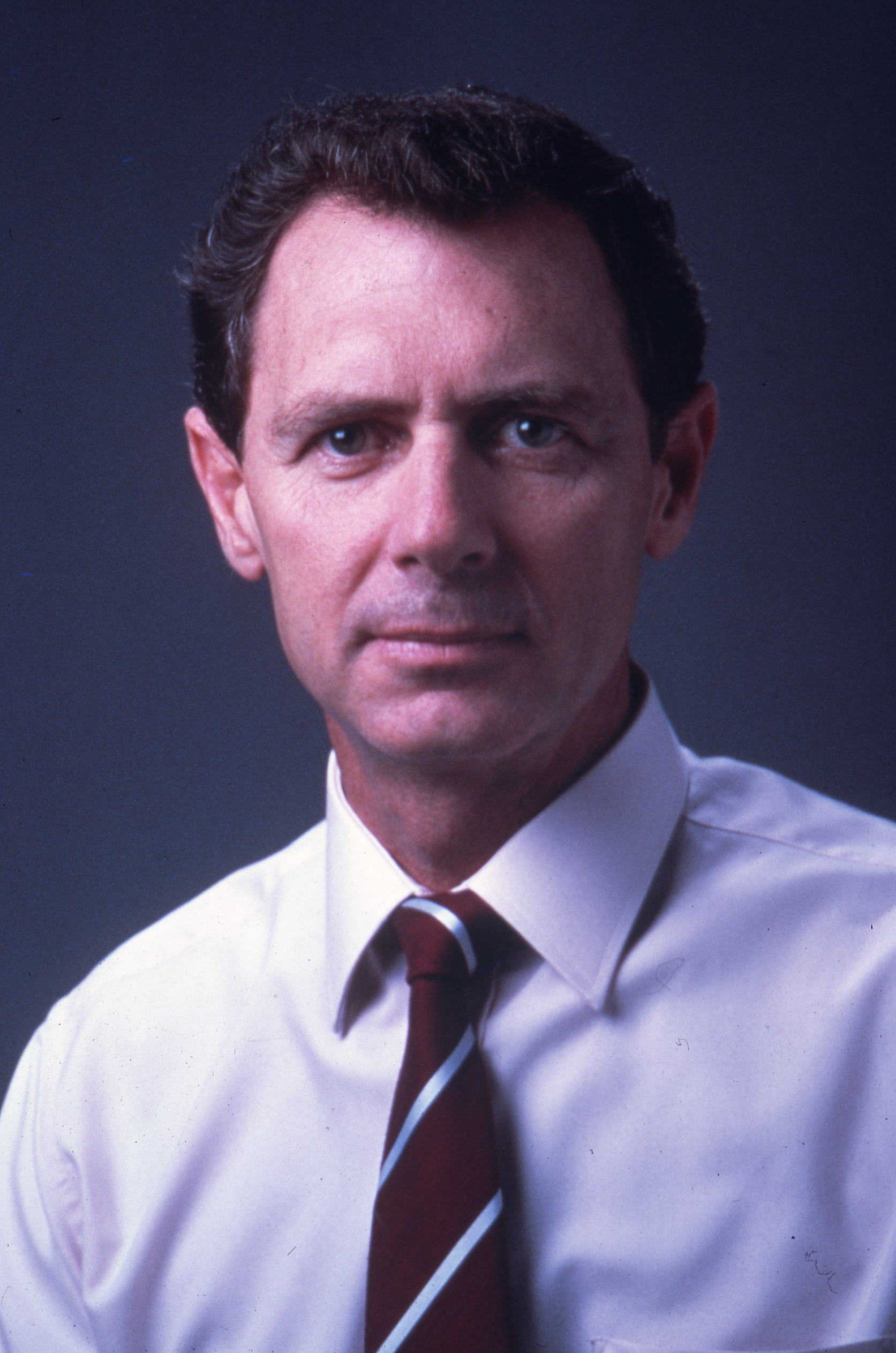

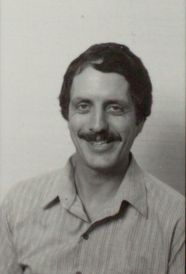

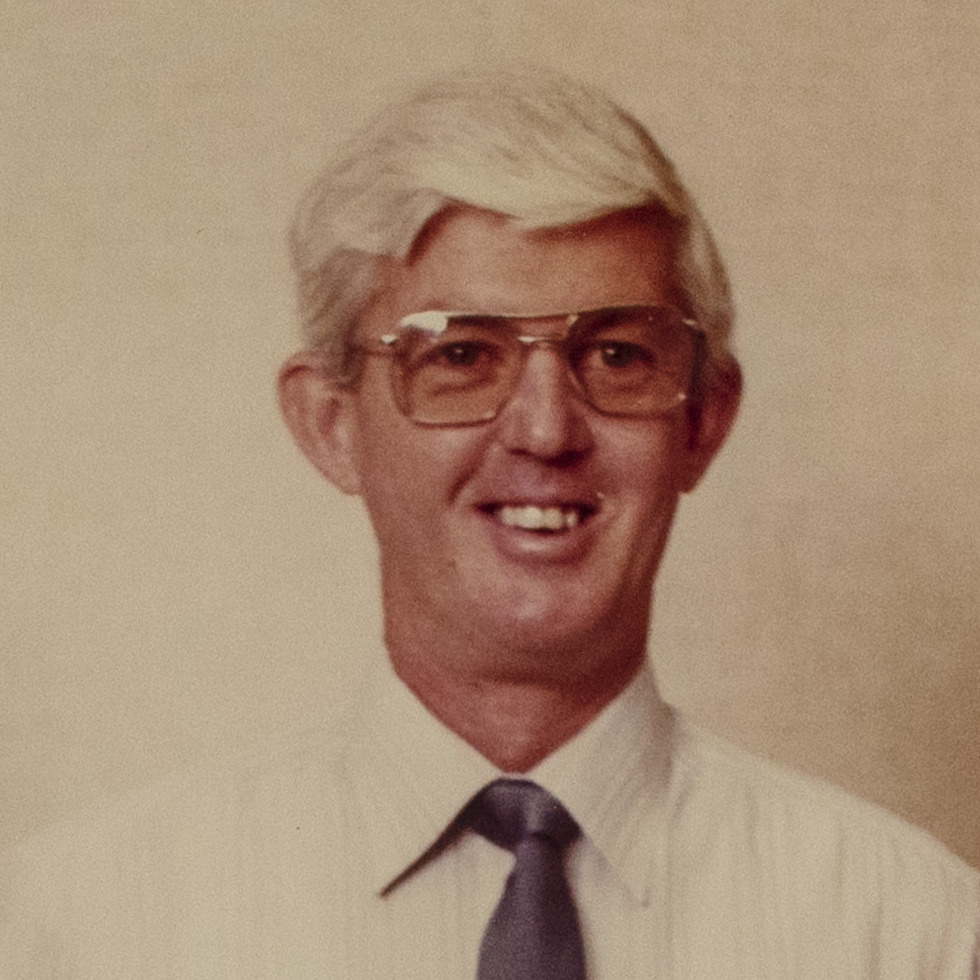
	First party	Second party	Third party
Leader	Marshall Perron	Terry Smith	Ian Tuxworth
Party	Country Liberal	Labor	Nationals
Leader since	14 July 1988	19 August 1986	10 May 1986
Leader's seat	Fannie Bay	Millner	Barkly (lost Goyder)
Last election	16 seats	6 seats	2 seats
Seats won	14	9 seats	0
Seat change	▼2	▲3	▼2
Popular vote	31,758	23,827	3,060
Percentage	48.8%	36.6%	4.7%
Swing	▲9.4	▲0.6	▼13.1
TPP	57.0%	43.0%
TPP	▼0.3	▲0.3
Chief Minister before election
Marshall Perron
Country Liberal
Elected Chief Minister
Marshall Perron
Country Liberal

A general election was held in the Northern Territory on Saturday 27 October 1990, and was won by the incumbent Country Liberal Party (CLP) under Chief Minister Marshall Perron.

The CLP's political strategy for the campaign, devised by the Chief Minister's media secretary, Tony-Barker May, involved costing the opposition ALP's policy platform, after Barker-May obtained a confidential copy of the Labor manifesto from his opposite number, and using the costings as the basis of a 'where's the money coming from?' media assault. Although the Chief Minister was ill for much of the campaign, Barker-May authored a series of media releases for other ministers, allowing them to keep pressure on Labor by making challenging statements every day. He also wrote a number of questions for the ABC 7.30 Report's Dennis Driver to put to Labor leader Terry Smith, resulting in an embarrassing interview at the height of the election campaign, and after Labor announced its campaign slogan 'Go Labor!' Barker-May countered with 'Go Labor, Go Broke!', displayed on placards at every polling booth.

The CLP also used the services of conservative social researcher Mark Textor, subsequently co-head of Crosby Textor Group, who made accurate polling predictions during this election, outperforming internal ALP polling and independent public polling. The result came as a surprise to most except for CLP insiders, many of whom wagered successfully on the election outcome.

Six months prior to the election, polling showed the CLP was headed for a big loss. However, the CLP government remained in power with an increase of over 9% to its primary vote, holding 14 of the 25 seats, with the ALP opposition gaining 3 seats for a total of 9 seats in the Northern Territory Legislative Assembly. Meanwhile, the Northern Territory Nationals contested the election again, but lost both of their seats of Barkly and Flynn, never to return. The 1990 election also saw the Greens emerge in territory politics, with 3.05% of the vote—fourth behind the CLP, Labor and the Nationals.

Independents Noel Padgham-Purich and Denis Collins were both re-elected.

== Retiring MPs ==
=== Labor ===
- Dan Leo MLA (Nhulunbuy)

=== Country Liberal ===
- Tom Harris MLA (Port Darwin)

== Results ==
↓
14	2	9
CLP	Ind	Labor

Summary of the results of the 1990 Northern Territory general election, Legislative Assembly
Party	Votes	%	+/–	Seats	+/–
Country Liberal	31,758	48.83	▲9.41	14	▼2
Labor	23,827	36.64	▲0.69	9	▲3
Independents	4,410	6.78	▼0.07	2	Steady
NT Nationals	3,060	4.71	▼13.08	0	▼1
Greens	1,981	3.05	New	0	Steady
Total	65,036	100.00	–	25	–
Valid votes	65,036	96.90			
Invalid/blank votes	2,081	3.10	▼1.04		
Total votes	67,117	100.00	–		
Registered voters/turnout	82,261	81.59	▲10.41		
Country Liberal	37,075	57.01			
Labor	27,961	42.99			
Total	65,036	100.00			

Popular vote
Country Liberal	48.83%
Labor	36.63%
NT Nationals	4.71%
Greens	3.05%
Independents	6.78%

Two-party-preferred vote
Country Liberal	57.00%
Labor	43.00%

Seats
Country Liberal	56.00%
Labor	36.00%
Independents	8.00%

== Candidates ==
Sitting members are listed in bold. Successful candidates are highlighted in the relevant colour.

Electorate	Held by	Labor	CLP	Nationals	Other
Arafura	Labor	**Stan Tipiloura**	Barry Puruntatameri		
Araluen	CLP	Brian Doolan	**Eric Poole**	**Enzo Floreani**	
Arnhem	Labor	**Wes Lanhupuy**	Tony Hayward-Ryan		Rod Ansell (Ind)
Barkly	National	Maggie Hickey	Paul Ruger	Kenneth Purvis	Tony Boulter (Ind); Charles Hallett (Ind)
Braitling	CLP	Matthew Storey	**Roger Vale**	Damien Ward	Leslie Oldfield (Ind)
Brennan	CLP	Ian Fraser	Max Ortmann		**Col Firmin** (Ind)
Casuarina	CLP	Rod Ellis	**Nick Dondas**	Lea Rosenwax	
Fannie Bay	CLP	Paul Costigan	**Marshall Perron**		Bob Ellis (Grn); Strider (Ind)
Goyder	CLP	Jack Ah Kit	**Terry McCarthy**	**Ian Tuxworth**	Kezia Purick (Ind); Louise Size (Grn); Thomas Starr (Ind)
Greatorex	Independent	Harold Furber	Robert Kennedy	David Johannsen	**Denis Collins** (Ind)
Jingili	CLP	Fiona Stuchbery	**Rick Setter**		Penelope Thomson (Ind)
Karama	CLP	Margaret Gillespie	**Mick Palmer**	Janet Durling	
Katherine	CLP	Phil Maynard	**Mike Reed**	Jim Forscutt	Laurie Hughes (Ind)
Leanyer	CLP	Jim Davidson	**Fred Finch**	Alan MacKenzie	
MacDonnell	Labor	**Neil Bell**	Brendan Heenan; Alison Hunt		
Millner	Labor	**Terry Smith**	Janice Collins		
Nelson	Independent	Peter Ivinson	David Sanderson	Graeme Gow	**Noel Padgham-Purich** (Ind)
Nhulunbuy	Labor	Syd Stirling	Susan McClure		
Nightcliff	CLP	David Pettigrew	**Stephen Hatton**		John Dunham (Grn)
Palmerston	CLP	Chris Draffin	**Barry Coulter**	Ronald Wright	Timothy Fowler (Grn)
Port Darwin	CLP	Peter Cavanagh	Shane Stone	David Fuller	Jessie Kearney (Grn)
Sanderson	CLP	Alan Perrin	**Daryl Manzie**		Graeme Parsons (Grn); Andrew Wrenn (Ind)
Stuart	Labor	**Brian Ede**	Eric Pananka; Alexander Nelson		
Victoria River	CLP	Gary Cartwright (politician)	Stephen Dunham		
Wanguri	Labor	**John Bailey**	John Hare		

== Seats changing hands ==
Seat	Pre-1990			Swing	Post-1990		
Seat	Party	Member	Margin	Swing	Margin	Member	Party
Barkly	NT Nationals	Ian Tuxworth	5.9	6.6	0.7	Maggie Hickey	Labor
Victoria River	Country Liberal	Terry McCarthy	9.5	11.0	1.5	Gary Cartwright (politician)	Labor

== Post-election pendulum ==
The following pendulum is known as the Mackerras pendulum, invented by psephologist Malcolm Mackerras. The pendulum works by lining up all of the seats held in the Legislative Assembly according to the percentage point margin they are held by on a two-party-preferred basis. This is also known as the swing required for the seat to change hands. Given a uniform swing to the opposition or government parties, the number of seats that change hands can be predicted.

Country Liberal seats
Marginal
Goyder	Terry McCarthy	CLP	4.1 v IND
Fairly safe
Sanderson	Daryl Manzie	CLP	9.0
Jingili	Rick Setter	CLP	9.2
Safe
Fannie Bay	Marshall Perron	CLP	10.0
Brennan	Max Ortmann	CLP	10.1
Karama	Mick Palmer	CLP	10.8
Casuarina	Nick Dondas	CLP	11.5
Port Darwin	Shane Stone	CLP	11.6
Palmerston	Barry Coulter	CLP	11.7
Leanyer	Fred Finch	CLP	11.9
Nightcliff	Stephen Hatton	CLP	12.1
Very safe
Araluen	Eric Poole	CLP	20.9
Katherine	Mike Reed	CLP	21.0
Braitling	Roger Vale	CLP	26.2

Labor seats
Marginal
Barkly	Maggie Hickey	ALP	0.7
Victoria River	Gary Cartwright (politician)	ALP	1.5
Fairly safe
Wanguri	John Bailey	ALP	6.2
Millner	Terry Smith	ALP	6.7
Nhulunbuy	Syd Stirling	ALP	9.1
Safe
Arnhem	Wes Lanhupuy	ALP	11.2
Macdonnell	Neil Bell	ALP	13.5
Arafura	Stan Tipiloura	ALP	16.5
Stuart	Brian Ede	ALP	17.0
Independent seats
Greatorex	Denis Collins	IND	2.5 v CLP
Nelson	Noel Padgham-Purich	IND	13.7 v CLP
