= Electoral division of Palmerston =

Palmerston was an electoral division of the Legislative Assembly in Australia's Northern Territory. It existed from 1987 to 1997. It was named after the town of Palmerston.

== Members for Palmerston ==
Member	Party	Term
Barry Coulter	Country Liberal	1987–1997

== Election results ==
=== Elections in the 1980s ===
1987 Northern Territory general election: Palmerston
Party	Candidate	Votes	%	±%
Country Liberal	Barry Coulter	1,429	53.2	
Labor	Tony Henry	821	30.5	
NT Nationals	Michael Ting	438	16.3	
Total formal votes		2,688	97.4	
Informal votes		72	2.6	
Turnout		2,760	81.9	
Two-party-preferred result
Country Liberal	Barry Coulter	1,751	65.1	−6.9
Labor	Tony Henry	937	34.9	+6.9
Country Liberal hold		Swing	−6.9	

=== Elections in the 1990s ===
1990 Northern Territory general election: Palmerston
Party	Candidate	Votes	%	±%
Country Liberal	Barry Coulter	1,382	57.1	+3.9
Labor	Chris Draffin	763	31.5	+1.0
Greens	Timothy Fowler	144	6.0	+6.0
NT Nationals	Ronald Wright	131	5.4	−10.9
Total formal votes		2,420	96.8	
Informal votes		79	3.2	
Turnout		2,499	83.6	
Two-party-preferred result
Country Liberal	Barry Coulter	1,494	61.7	+0.2
Labor	Chris Draffin	926	38.3	−0.2
Country Liberal hold		Swing	+0.2	

1994 Northern Territory general election: Palmerston
Party	Candidate	Votes	%	±%
Country Liberal	Barry Coulter	1,938	59.1	+2.0
Labor	Kevin Diflo	1,129	34.4	+2.9
Independent	David Elliott	214	6.5	+6.5
Total formal votes		3,281	97.6	
Informal votes		81	2.4	
Turnout		3,362	87.1	
Two-party-preferred result
Country Liberal	Barry Coulter	2,063	62.9	+1.2
Labor	Kevin Diflo	1,218	37.1	−1.2
Country Liberal hold		Swing	+1.2	
