= Electoral division of Wagaman =

Former electoral division of the Northern Territory

Wagaman was an electoral division of the Legislative Assembly in Australia's Northern Territory. It existed from 1983 to 1987 and was named after the Darwin suburb of Wagaman.

== Members for Wagaman ==
Member	Party	Term
Fred Finch	Country Liberal	1983–1987

== Election results ==
=== Elections in the 1980s ===
1983 Northern Territory general election: Wagaman
Party	Candidate	Votes	%	±%
Country Liberal	Fred Finch	1,265	61.1	
Labor	Brian Reid	807	38.9	
Total formal votes		2,072	97.3	
Informal votes		58	2.7	
Turnout		2,130	89.2	
Country Liberal hold		Swing		
