= Col Firmin =

Australian politician

Colin Charles "Col" Firmin (11 April 1940 – 3 March 2013) was a former Australian politician.

Firmin served as an Alderman for the City of Darwin from 1976 to 1983 before his preselection by the ruling Country Liberal Party (CLP) for the Electoral division of Ludmilla in the Northern Territory Legislative Assembly and his subsequent election at the 1983 Northern Territory election.

Northern Territory Legislative Assembly
Years	Term	Electoral division	Party
1983–1987	4th	Ludmilla	Country Liberal
1987–1990	5th	Ludmilla	Country Liberal
1990	Changed allegiance to:		Independent

Firmin was re-elected at the 1987 election but following the abolishing of the Ludmilla electorate in 1990, he lost preselection for the new seat of Brennan to Max Ortmann. Firmin quit the CLP and ran at the 1990 election as an independent but was defeated by Ortmann.

Firmin died in Buddina, Queensland on 3 March 2013, aged 72, from undisclosed causes.

Northern Territory Legislative Assembly
Preceded by Roger Steele	Member for Ludmilla; 1983–1990	Succeeded by Abolished
