= Brian Ede =

Australian politician (born 1946)

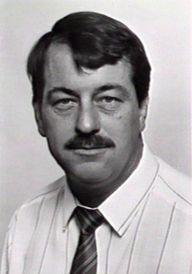
Brian Ede.

Brian Richard Ede (born 9 March 1946) is a former Australian politician. He was the Labor member for Stuart in the Northern Territory Legislative Assembly from 1983 to 1996 and led Labor unsuccessfully to the 1994 territory election.

Northern Territory Legislative Assembly
Years	Term	Electoral division	Party
1983–1987	4th	Stuart	Labor
1987–1990	5th	Stuart	Labor
1990–1994	6th	Stuart	Labor
1994–1996	7th	Stuart	Labor

Northern Territory Legislative Assembly
Preceded by Roger Vale	Member for Stuart; 1983–1996	Succeeded by Peter Toyne
