= 1983 Northern Territory general election =

- 3 December 1983

All 25 seats of the Northern Territory Legislative Assembly 13 seats needed for a majority
- Turnout: 81.6% (▲3.6 pp)
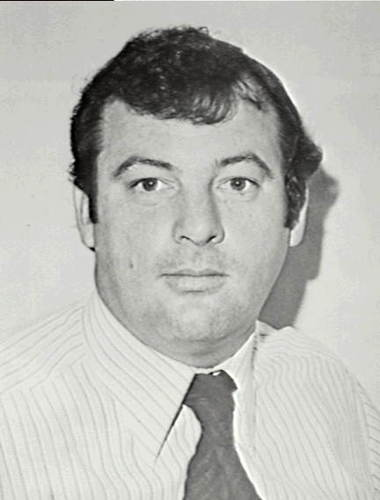

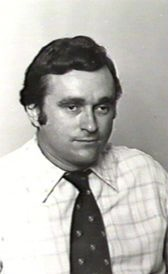
	First party	Second party
Leader	Paul Everingham	Bob Collins
Party	Country Liberal	Labor
Leader since	13 August 1977	2 November 1981
Leader's seat	Jingili	Arafura
Last election	11 seats	7 seats
Seats won	19	6
Seat change	▲8	▼1
Popular vote	28,637	17,505
Percentage	58.2%	35.6%
Swing	▲8.2	▼3.8
TPP	61.1%	38.9%
Chief Minister before election
Paul Everingham
Country Liberal
Elected Chief Minister
Paul Everingham
Country Liberal

A general election was held in the Northern Territory, Australia on Saturday 3 December 1983. The result was a landslide victory for the incumbent Country Liberal Party (CLP) under Chief Minister Paul Everingham over the Australian Labor Party (ALP) opposition under Opposition leader Bob Collins.

For this election, the size of the assembly was increased from 19 to 25.

The only independent of the Legislative Assembly, Dawn Lawrie, lost her seat of Nightcliff at this election to the CLP.

== Retiring MPs ==
=== CLP ===
- Les MacFarlane MLA (Elsey)

== Results ==
↓
19	6
CLP	Labor

Summary of the results of the 1983 Northern Territory general election, Legislative Assembly
Party	Votes	%	+/–	Seats	+/–
Country Liberal	28,637	58.22	▲8.25	19	▲8
Labor	17,505	35.59	▼3.80	6	▼1
Independents	2,155	4.38	▼3.72	0	▼1
Democrats	887	1.80	▲0.92	0	Steady
Total	49,184	100.00	–	25	–
Valid votes	49,184	96.98			
Invalid/blank votes	1,532	3.02	▼0.37		
Total votes	50,716	100.00	–		
Registered voters/turnout	62,185	81.56	▼12.49		
Country Liberal		61.1			
Labor		38.9			
Total					

Popular vote
Country Liberal	58.22%
Labor	35.59%
Democrats	1.80%
Independents	4.38%

Two-party-preferred vote
Country Liberal	61.10%
Labor	38.90%

Seats
Country Liberal	76.00%
Labor	24.00%

== Candidates ==
Sitting members are listed in bold. Successful candidates are highlighted in the relevant colour. Where there is possible confusion, an asterisk is used.

Electorate	Held by	Labor	CLP	Other
Arafura	New	**Bob Collins**	Robert Woodward	Kevin Doolan (Dem)
Araluen	New	Allen Joy	**Jim Robertson**	Goff Letts (Ind)
Arnhem	Labor	Wes Lanhupuy	David Amos; David Daniels	Klaus Rogers (Dem)
Barkly	CLP	Charles Hallett	**Ian Tuxworth**	
Berrimah	New	Colin Young	Barry Coulter	
Braitling	New	Ross Kerridge	**Roger Vale**	
Casuarina	CLP	Lionel Crompton	**Nick Dondas**	
Elsey	CLP	Trevor Surplice	**Roger Steele**	James Forscutt (Ind)
Fannie Bay	Labor	**Pam O'Neil**	**Marshall Perron**	Gerald Luck (Ind)
Flynn	New	Peter Hughes	Ray Hanrahan	Pamela Gardiner (Ind)
Jingili	CLP	Martin Jacob	**Paul Everingham**	
Koolpinyah	New	Robert Wesley-Smith	**Noel Padgham-Purich**	Murray Leeder (Dem); Michael Sanderson (Ind)
Leanyer	New	John Waters	Mick Palmer	
Ludmilla	CLP	Allan O'Neil	Col Firmin	
Macdonnell	Labor	**Neil Bell**	Ian McKinlay	Ted Hampton (Dem)
Millner	Labor	**Terry Smith**	Lorraine Palfy	Christopher Fenner (Ind)
Nhulunbuy	Labor	**Dan Leo**	Kevin Graetz	
Nightcliff	Independent	Colin Dyer	Stephen Hatton	**Dawn Lawrie** (Ind)
Port Darwin	CLP	Russel Kearney	**Tom Harris**	
Sadadeen	New	Morgan Flint	**Denis Collins**	
Sanderson	Labor	**June D'Rozario**	Daryl Manzie	
Stuart	CLP	Brian Ede	Bobby Liddle	
Victoria River	Labor	Dennis Bree	Terry McCarthy*; Ronald Wright	**Jack Doolan** (Ind); Maurie Ryan (Dem)
Wagaman	New	Brian Reid	Fred Finch	
Wanguri	New	Pat Burke	Don Dale	Edward Miller (Ind)

== Post-election pendulum ==
The following pendulum is known as the Mackerras pendulum, invented by psephologist Malcolm Mackerras. The pendulum works by lining up all of the seats held in the Legislative Assembly according to the percentage point margin they are held by on a two-party-preferred basis. This is also known as the swing required for the seat to change hands. Given a uniform swing to the opposition or government parties, the number of seats that change hands can be predicted.

Country Liberal seats
Marginal
Sanderson	Daryl Manzie	CLP	4.8
Fairly safe
Nightcliff	Stephen Hatton	CLP	7.9 v IND
Ludmilla	Col Firmin	CLP	8.2
Fannie Bay	Marshall Perron	CLP	9.8
Safe
Barkly	Ian Tuxworth	CLP	10.3
Wagaman	Fred Finch	CLP	11.1
Wanguri	Don Dale	CLP	11.4
Victoria River	Terry McCarthy	CLP	15.2
Casuarina	Nick Dondas	CLP	15.4
Elsey	Roger Steele	CLP	15.8
Leanyer	Mick Palmer	CLP	15.9
Araluen	Jim Robertson	CLP	16.2 v IND
Port Darwin	Tom Harris	CLP	18.6
Berrimah	Barry Coulter	CLP	18.7
Flynn	Ray Hanrahan	CLP	19.2
Very safe
Koolpinyah	Noel Padgham-Purich	CLP	20.1
Sadadeen	Denis Collins	CLP	20.5
Jingili	Paul Everingham	CLP	21.8
Braitling	Roger Vale	CLP	27.8

Labor seats
Marginal
Nhulunbuy	Dan Leo	ALP	1.2
Millner	Terry Smith	ALP	4.4
Fairly safe
Arnhem	Wes Lanhupuy	ALP	8.6
Macdonnell	Neil Bell	ALP	8.9
Safe
Arafura	Bob Collins	ALP	11.7
Stuart	Brian Ede	ALP	14.3
