= Electoral division of Leanyer =

Former electoral division of the Northern Territory

Leanyer was an electoral division of the Legislative Assembly in Australia's Northern Territory. It existed from 1983 to 1997 (when it was replaced by Drysdale), and was named after the Darwin suburb of Leanyer.

== Members for Leanyer ==
Member	Party	Term
Mick Palmer	Country Liberal	1983–1987
Fred Finch	Country Liberal	1987–1997

== Election results ==
=== Elections in the 1980s ===
1983 Northern Territory general election: Leanyer
Party	Candidate	Votes	%	±%
Country Liberal	Mick Palmer	1,940	65.9	
Labor	John Waters	1,002	34.1	
Total formal votes		2,942	96.6	
Informal votes		105	3.4	
Turnout		3,047	90.8	
Country Liberal hold		Swing		

1987 Northern Territory general election: Leanyer
Party	Candidate	Votes	%	±%
Country Liberal	Fred Finch	1,105	43.0	−22.9
Labor	David Lamb-Jenkins	996	38.7	+4.6
NT Nationals	David Wane	471	18.3	+18.3
Total formal votes		2,572	97.1	
Informal votes		77	2.9	
Turnout		2,649	78.2	
Two-party-preferred result
Country Liberal	Fred Finch	1,447	56.3	−6.7
Labor	David Lamb-Jenkins	1,125	43.7	+6.7
Country Liberal hold		Swing	−6.7	

=== Elections in the 1990s ===
1990 Northern Territory general election: Leanyer
Party	Candidate	Votes	%	±%
Country Liberal	Fred Finch	1,638	58.5	+15.5
Labor	Jim Davidson	1,002	35.8	−2.9
NT Nationals	Alan MacKenzie	158	5.6	−12.7
Total formal votes		2,798	97.9	
Informal votes		61	2.1	
Turnout		2,859	87.9	
Two-party-preferred result
Country Liberal	Fred Finch	1,733	61.9	+5.6
Labor	Jim Davidson	1,065	38.1	−5.6
Country Liberal hold		Swing	+5.6	

1994 Northern Territory general election: Leanyer
Party	Candidate	Votes	%	±%
Country Liberal	Fred Finch	1,912	60.1	+1.6
Labor	Cossimo Russo	1,269	39.9	+4.1
Total formal votes		3,181	96.1	
Informal votes		129	3.9	
Turnout		3,310	86.5	
Country Liberal hold		Swing	−1.8	
