= Mick Palmer (Australian politician) =

Australian politician and author

The Honourable Mick Palmer
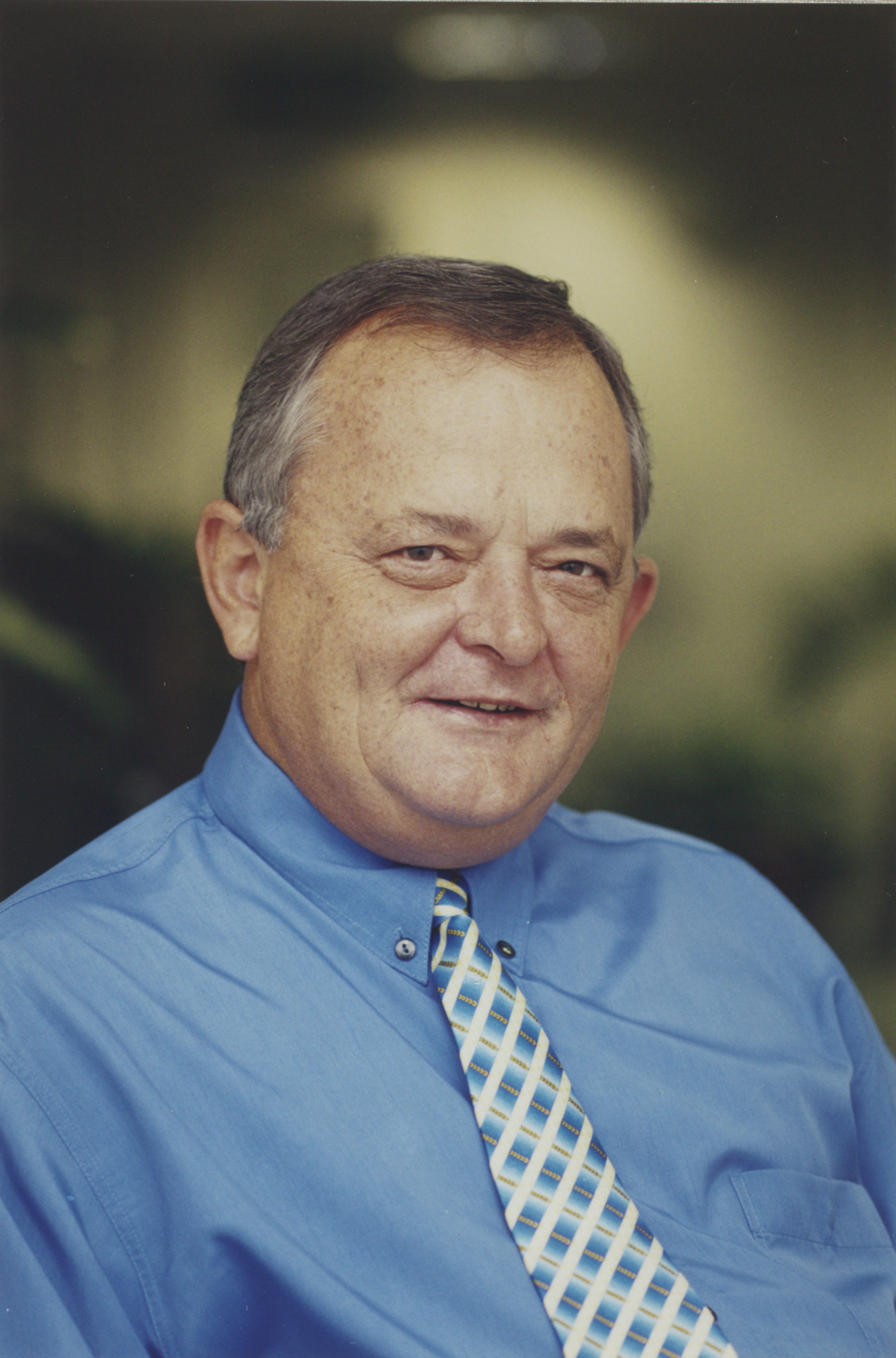
- Palmer in 2001

Member of the Northern Territory Legislative Assembly for Leanyer
- In office 3 December 1983 – 7 March 1987
- Preceded by: Seat created
- Succeeded by: Fred Finch

Member of the Northern Territory Legislative Assembly for Karama
- In office 7 March 1987 – 18 August 2001
- Preceded by: Seat created
- Succeeded by: Delia Lawrie

Councillor of the City of Darwin for Lyons Ward
- Incumbent
- Assumed office 2015

Personal details
- Born: 27 January 1953 (age 73)
- Party: Country Liberal

Michael James Palmer (born 27 January 1953) is an Australian politician and a children's book author. He moved to Darwin in 1960 and was a Country Liberal Party (CLP) member of the Northern Territory Legislative Assembly from 1983 to 2001, representing Leanyer until 1987 and Karama thereafter. He served in various Cabinet positions while a MLA. He was defeated by Labor candidate Delia Lawrie at the 2001 election. He currently serves on the Darwin City Council as a member of the Lyons Ward, first elected in 2015.

== Early life and education ==
Palmer was born on 27 January 1953. In 1960, his family relocated to Darwin where he attended Saint Mary's Catholic Primary School. From 1970 to 1983, Palmer worked for the Commonwealth and Northern Territory public service.

== Political career ==
=== Territory politics ===
Palmer entered territory politics at the 1983 election by contesting the new seat of Leanyer, which comprised northern suburbs of Darwin, for the CLP. He defeated Labor's John Waters with a comfortable 65.9% of the primary vote as part of the CLP's landslide victory.

For the 1987 election, Palmer contested the new seat of Karama, comprising some of Darwin's northern suburbs, for the CLP. He ended up receiving 1,076 primary votes (42.7%), and won the seat with 1,423 (56.5%) of the two-party-preferred (TPP) votes against Labor's Robyn Crompton, who received 43.5% of the TPP votes. Palmer subsequently became the seat's inaugural member. In the next three elections, Palmer continued to hold the seat with 55.3% of the primary vote in 1990, 50.8% in 1994, and 51.7% in 1997. Palmer, however, lost Karama in 2001, which had become a marginal seat. He ended up receiving 46.3% of the vote, losing to Labor's Delia Lawrie who won with 53.7%.

As a MLA, Palmer held several cabinet positions, listed below:

- Minister for Primary Industry and Fisheries, 18 July 1994 to 26 August 2001 under the Perron, Stone, and Burke ministries.
- Minister Assisting the Minister for Lands, Housing and Local Government on Lands Matters, 18 July 1994 to 30 July 1995, under Perron and Stone.
- Minister for Transport and Works, 1 July 1995 to 20 June 1996, under Stone.
- Minister for Aboriginal Development, 21 June 1996 to 14 September 1997, under Stone.
- Minister for Housing, 21 June 1996 to 14 September 1997, under Stone.
- Minister for Local Government, 21 June 1996 to 14 September 1997, under Stone.
- Minister for Lands, Planning and Environment, 15 September 1997 to 7 December 1998, under Stone.
- Minister for Ethnic Affairs, 15 September 1997 to 3 August 1999, under Stone and Burke.
- Minister for Correctional Services, 8 December 1998 to 3 August 1999, under Stone and Burke.
- Leader of Government Business, 4 August 1999 to 30 January 2000, under Burke.
- Minister for Transport and Infrastructure Development, 4 August 1999 to 26 August 2001, under Burke.

At some point when Palmer was a Minister, he had a hostile encounter with journalist John Brendan Loizou, a self-described Marxist, at the Petty Sessions bar in Darwin. He ended up headbutting Loizou, going on to then say that he "snorted" Loizou. The incident produced the headline "Toothless MP head butts reporter" - Palmer had first removed his teeth before headbutting. Palmer was granted the title The Honourable by the Governor-General on March 2026.

Northern Territory Legislative Assembly
Years	Term	Electoral division	Party
1983–1987	4th	Leanyer	Country Liberal
1987–1990	5th	Karama	Country Liberal
1990–1994	6th	Karama	Country Liberal
1994–1997	7th	Karama	Country Liberal
1997–2001	8th	Karama	Country Liberal

=== Local politics ===
In 2015, Palmer returned to politics with by becoming a councillor for Lyons Ward in the City of Darwin. Palmer, who had campaigned on a position to make Darwin beautiful again, won the ward by defeating former Greens candidate Emma Young. In 2017, he contested the election for Lord Mayor of Darwin with the campaign slogan, "Reboot Darwin". On his campaign, Palmer advocated for better landscaping of verges to instil civic pride, and the transformation of Lameroo Beach into a major beach for the city. On election day on 26 August, Palmer came 3rd and received 4,651 primary votes (15.4%). The position of Lord Mayor, however, was won by Kon Vatskalis. Besides the position of Lord Mayor, Palmer also re-contested Lyons Ward, where he came 1st and received 1,950 votes (24.1%). Alongside Palmer, Sherry Cullen and Simon Niblock were also elected as councillors for Lyons Ward.

Northern Territory Legislative Assembly
Preceded by New seat	Member for Leanyer; 1983–1987	Succeeded by Fred Finch
Preceded by New seat	Member for Karama; 1987–2001	Succeeded by Delia Lawrie
