= Electoral divisions of the Northern Territory =

The Northern Territory Legislative Assembly is made up of 25 single-member electoral divisions.

The Electoral Act 2004 dictates the characteristics of each of these electorates, and requires, among other things, that each electorate has a similar number of eligible voters and that the physical area of an electorate should be kept as small as is practicable. Mandatory redistributions take place in the middle of each term in order to respond to changing demographics. The boundaries of each division attempts to match a quota of the average divisional enrolment as closely as possible. Redistributions are organised by the independent Northern Territory Electoral Commission.

As of 14 June 2019, the quota of electors was 5,555. At the general election in August 2020, the quota was 5,649. Northern Territory divisions are the smallest such electorates in Australia, due to the Territory's small population.

With so few constituents, an MLA can easily get to know all of the enrolled voters in his or her electorate. This is the case even in rural and remote electorates; MLAs frequently devote significant resources to constituent services.

== List of electoral divisions ==
- Electoral division of Arafura created 1983
- Electoral division of Araluen created 1983
- Electoral division of Arnhem created 1974
- Electoral division of Barkly created 1974
- Electoral division of Blain created 1997
- Electoral division of Braitling created 1983
- Electoral division of Brennan created 1990
- Electoral division of Casuarina created 1974
- Electoral division of Daly created 2001
- Electoral division of Drysdale created 1997
- Electoral division of Fannie Bay created 1974
- Electoral division of Fong Lim created 2008
- Electoral division of Goyder created 1990
- Electoral division of Gwoja created 2020
- Electoral division of Johnston created 2001
- Electoral division of Karama created 1987
- Electoral division of Katherine created 1987
- Electoral division of Mulka created 2020
- Electoral division of Namatjira created 2012
- Electoral division of Nelson created 1990
- Electoral division of Nightcliff created 1974
- Electoral division of Port Darwin created 1974
- Electoral division of Sanderson created 1974
- Electoral division of Spillett created 2016
- Electoral division of Wanguri created 1983

== List of abolished electoral divisions ==
There are 20 electoral divisions that have been abolished:

- Electoral division of Alice Springs (1974–1983)
- Electoral division of Berrimah (1983–1987)
- Electoral division of Elsey (1974–1987)
- Electoral division of Flynn (1983–1990)
- Electoral division of Gillen (1974–1983)
- Electoral division of Greatorex (1990–2016)
- Electoral division of Jingili (1974–2001)
- Electoral division of Koolpinyah (1983–1990)
- Electoral division of Leanyer (1983–1997)
- Electoral division of Ludmilla (1974–1990)
- Electoral division of MacDonnell (1974–2012)
- Electoral division of Millner (1974–2008)
- Electoral division of Nhulunbuy (1974–2020)
- Electoral division of Palmerston (1987–1997)
- Electoral division of Sadadeen (1983–1990)
- Electoral division of Stuart (1974–2020)
- Electoral division of Stuart Park (1974–1983)
- Electoral division of Tiwi (1974–1983)
- Electoral division of Victoria River (1974–2001)
- Electoral division of Wagaman (1983–1987)

== See also ==
- Division of Solomon (Darwin-based federal electorate)
- Division of Lingiari (regional federal electorate)
- Division of Northern Territory (abolished federal electorate that preceded the creation of Solomon and Lingiari)
