= Roger Vale =

Australian politician

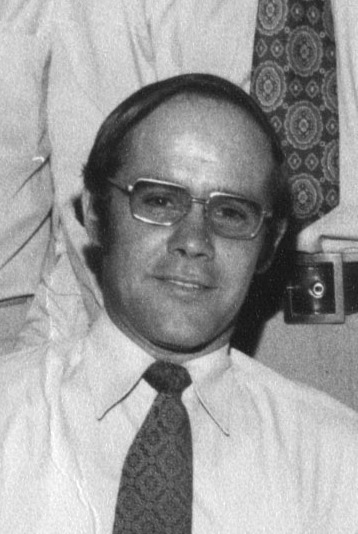
Vale in 1976

Northern Territory Legislative Assembly
Years	Term	Electoral division	Party
1974–1977	1st	Stuart	Country Liberal
1977–1980	2nd	Stuart	Country Liberal
1980–1983	3rd	Stuart	Country Liberal
1983–1987	4th	Braitling	Country Liberal
1987–1990	5th	Braitling	Country Liberal
1990–1994	6th	Braitling	Country Liberal

Roger William Stanley Vale (28 June 1942 – 10 April 2001) was an Australian politician. He was a Country Liberal Party member of the Northern Territory Legislative Assembly from 1974 to 1994, representing Stuart from until 1983 and Braitling thereafter. His father, Monte Vale, was a member of the Victorian Legislative Assembly.

Northern Territory Legislative Assembly
Preceded by New seat	Member for Stuart; 1974–1983	Succeeded by Brian Ede
Preceded by New seat	Member for Braitling; 1983–1994	Succeeded by Loraine Braham
