= Eric Poole (Australian politician) =

Australian politician (1942–2021)

The Honourable Eric Poole

Member of the Northern Territory Legislative Assembly for Araluen
- In office 19 April 1986 – 17 August 2001
- Preceded by: Jim Robertson
- Succeeded by: Jodeen Carney

Personal details
- Born: Eric Houguet Poole; 10 August 1942
- Died: 18 August 2021 (aged 79) Bali, Indonesia
- Party: Country Liberal Party

Northern Territory Legislative Assembly
Years	Term	Electoral division	Party
1986–1987	4th	Araluen	Country Liberal
1987–1990	5th	Araluen	Country Liberal
1990–1994	6th	Araluen	Country Liberal
1994–1997	7th	Araluen	Country Liberal
1997–2001	8th	Araluen	Country Liberal

Eric Houguet Poole (10 August 1942 – 18 August 2021) was an Australian politician. He was the Country Liberal Party member for Araluen in the Northern Territory Legislative Assembly from 1986 to 2001. In 1989, his Ministerial portfolio included racing, gaming and tourism. In 1995, he was chairman of a parliamentary committee considering euthanasia. Prior to his election, he acted as Chairman of the Northern Territory Tourism Commission. Poole appears briefly in Cathy Henkel's documentary film Walking Through a Minefield (1999) regarding his involvement in the development of the Jabiluka uranium mine.

Poole died on 18 August 2021 in Bali.

Northern Territory Legislative Assembly
Preceded by Jim Robertson	Member for Araluen; 1986–2001	Succeeded by Jodeen Carney
