= Daryl Manzie =

Australian politician

The Honourable Daryl Manzie AM

Member of the Northern Territory Legislative Assembly for Sanderson
- In office 3 December 1983 – 17 August 2001
- Preceded by: June D'Rozario
- Succeeded by: Len Kiely

Personal details
- Born: 2 November 1946 (age 79)
- Party: Country Liberal Party
- Spouse: Maureen Manzie
- Occupation: Police officer

Daryl William Manzie AM (born 2 November 1946) is an Australian former politician. He was the Country Liberal Party member for Sanderson in the Northern Territory Legislative Assembly from 1983 to 2001.

Northern Territory Legislative Assembly
Years	Term	Electoral division	Party
1983–1987	4th	Sanderson	Country Liberal
1987–1990	5th	Sanderson	Country Liberal
1990–1994	6th	Sanderson	Country Liberal
1994–1997	7th	Sanderson	Country Liberal
1997–2001	8th	Sanderson	Country Liberal

Manzie moved to the Northern Territory in 1968, and served as a police officer for 15 years with the Northern Territory Police.

At the 1983 general election, Manzie was elected to the Northern Territory Legislative Assembly for the seat of Sanderson.

He was a minister in the Everingham, Tuxworth, Hatton, Perron, Stone and Burke governments, serving as Minister for Community Development (1983–1984), Minister for Transport and Works and Housing (1984–1986), Attorney-General (1986–1992 and 1993–1994), Minister for Education (1986–1987), Minister for Lands and Housing (1987–1990), Minister for Conservation (1987–1989 and 1992–1993), Minister for Health and Community Services (1990–1992), Minister for Work Health and Territory Insurance (1992–1993), Minister for Transport and Works (1993–1995), Minister for Police, Fire and Emergency Services (1994–1995), Minister for Housing (1995–1996), Minister for Local Government (1995–1996), Minister for Aboriginal Development (1995–1996), Minister for Correctional Services (1995–1996 and 2000–2001), Minister for Mines and Energy (1996–1997), Minister for Power and Water (1996–1997), Minister for Territory Insurance (1996–1997 and 2000–2001), Minister for Arts and Museums (1996–1999), Minister for Asian Relations, Trade and Industry (1997–1998), Minister for Regional Development (1997–1998), Minister for Asian Relations and Trade (1998–2001), Minister for Industries and Small Business (1998), Minister for Corporate and Information Services (1998–1999), Minister for Communications, Science and Advanced Technology (1998–1999), Minister for Resource Development (1999–2001) and Minister for Public Employment and Industrial Relations (1999–2000).

After retiring from politics in 2001, Manzie worked as a volunteer presenter on the morning show of community radio station 104.1 Territory FM. He retired from radio in December 2016, after 15 years on air.

Manzie was appointed in 2017 as Chair to the NT Committee and to the National Board of the Duke of Edinburgh's International Award – Australia.

== Honours ==
In 2010, Charles Darwin University conferred Manzie with a Doctor of Letters, Honoris Causa.

In the 2018 Queen's Birthday honours, Manzie was made a Member of the Order of Australia. Silver Distinguished Service Medal, The Duke of Edinburgh's International Award – Australia (2025) https://dukeofed.com.au/about/honour-roll/

Northern Territory Legislative Assembly
Preceded by June D'Rozario	Member for Sanderson; 1983–2001	Succeeded by Len Kiely
