= Fred Finch (politician) =

Australian politician (1945–2018)

Frederick Arthur Finch AM (16 June 1945 – 12 November 2018) was an Australian politician, a Country Liberal Party member of the Northern Territory Legislative Assembly from 1983 to 1997, representing Wagaman until 1987 and Leanyer thereafter.

== Early and personal life ==
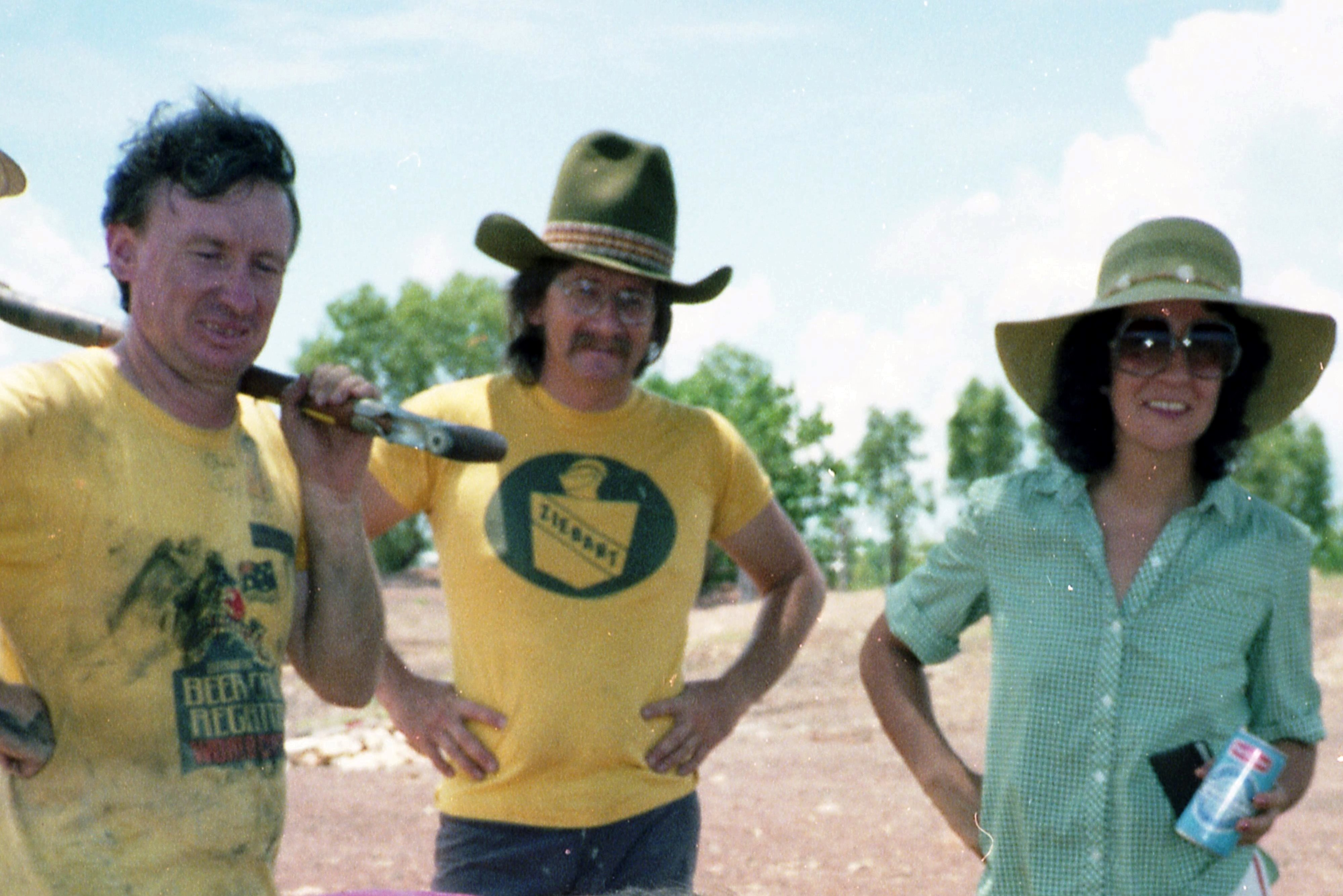
Finch (left) at a Lions working bee

Finch was born in Port Kembla, New South Wales. He graduated from the University of Wollongong in 1969 with a B.S. degree in civil engineering and then worked at the Sydney Water Board. In 1974 Finch moved to Darwin, Northern Territory, where he became partner in a firm of consulting engineers. He was involved in a professional capacity with reconstruction efforts following Cyclone Tracy.

He was a prominent member of Lions Clubs Australia: an active member of the Lions Club of Darwin Casuarina for around 20 years, serving as President and in many other responsible positions both locally and at a District level, notably Zone Chairman (twice) and Deputy District Governor 201S3 (twice).

== Political career ==
Northern Territory Legislative Assembly
Years	Term	Electoral division	Party
1983–1987	4th	Wagaman	Country Liberal
1987–1990	5th	Leanyer	Country Liberal
1990–1994	6th	Leanyer	Country Liberal
1994–1997	7th	Leanyer	Country Liberal

In 1984, Finch, encouraged by the Chief Minister Paul Everingham, won a legislative seat as a member of the Country Liberal Party.

Finch served as a minister in the Hatton, Perron and Stone governments, serving as Minister for Transport and Works (1987–1992), Minister for Racing and Gaming (1989–1990, 1996–1997), Minister for Education and Training (1992–1995, 1996–1997), Minister for Public Employment (1992–1994, 1995–1997), Attorney-General (1994–1995), Minister for Health Services (1995–1996) and Minister for the Liquor Commission (1995–1996).

== Recognition ==
- Around 2000, he was appointed Honorary Lion by his old club, Darwin Casuarina.
- In January 2007, Finch was made a Member of the Order of Australia for his "service to the community of the Northern Territory."

Northern Territory Legislative Assembly
Preceded by New seat	Member for Wagaman; 1983–1987	Succeeded by Abolished
Preceded by Mick Palmer	Member for Leanyer; 1987–1997	Succeeded by Abolished
