= Denis Collins (politician) =

Australian politician

Northern Territory Legislative Assembly
Years	Term	Electoral division	Party
1980–1983	3rd	Alice Springs	Country Liberal
1983–1987	4th	Sadadeen	Country Liberal
1987–1990	5th	Sadadeen	Country Liberal
1990–1994	6th	Greatorex	Country Liberal

Denis Wilfred Collins (born 27 October 1941) is a former Australian politician. He was a member of the Northern Territory Legislative Assembly from 1980 to 1997, representing Alice Springs until 1983, Sadadeen until 1990 and Greatorex thereafter. He was first elected as a member of the Country Liberal Party, but lost the preselection to future Chief Minister Shane Stone in 1986 and became an Independent, defeating Stone to win re-election in 1987. A conspiracy theorist, Collins advocated burying guns in the desert in response to the Fabian Socialist World Bank conspiracy. He was defeated in 1994 by CLP candidate Richard Lim.

In later years he joined One Nation, and contested the Tasmanian seat of Bass for the party in 2001.

Northern Territory Legislative Assembly
Preceded by Rod Oliver	Member for Alice Springs; 1980–1983	Succeeded by Abolished
Preceded by New seat	Member for Sadadeen; 1983–1990	Succeeded by Abolished
Preceded by New seat	Member for Greatorex; 1990–1994	Succeeded by Richard Lim
