= Barry Coulter =

Australian politician

Northern Territory Legislative Assembly
Years	Term	Electoral division	Party
1983–1987	4th	Berrimah	Country Liberal
1987–1990	5th	Palmerston	Country Liberal
1990–1994	6th	Palmerston	Country Liberal
1994–1997	7th	Palmerston	Country Liberal
1997–1999	8th	Blain	Country Liberal

Barry Francis Coulter AO (born 27 December 1948) is a former Australian politician. He was a Country Liberal Party member of the Northern Territory Legislative Assembly from 1983 to 1999, representing the electorates of Berrimah, Palmerston and Blain. He was Deputy Chief Minister from 1986 to 1995 under Stephen Hatton and Marshall Perron. He was expected to succeed Perron but was defeated by Shane Stone.

Northern Territory Legislative Assembly
Preceded by New seat	Member for Berrimah; 1983–1987	Succeeded by Abolished
Preceded by New seat	Member for Palmerston; 1987–1997	Succeeded by Abolished
Preceded by New seat	Member for Blain; 1997–1999	Succeeded by Terry Mills
