= Northern Territory Nationals =

Former political party in the Northern Territory, Australia

- Abbreviation: NT Nationals; NTN
- Leader: Ian Tuxworth
- Founder: Ian Tuxworth
- Founded: November 1986; 38 years ago
- Dissolved: c. 1990; 35 years ago
- Legislative Assembly: 2 / 25 (1988−1990)
- Alice Springs Town Council: 1 / 10 (1988−1990)

The Northern Territory Nationals was a political party active in the Northern Territory in the late 1980s. The party was not affiliated with the National Party of Australia, the NT affiliate of which was the Country Liberal Party. However, the party was associated with the Queensland National Party-supported "Joh for Canberra" campaign.

After the 1987 election, the party was represented in the Assembly by Ian Tuxworth, the former Chief Minister and CLP leader. The party gained a second seat in 1988, when Enzo Floreani won a by-election in the seat of Flynn. However, a redistribution ahead of the 1990 election erased Tuxworth's majority in Barkly and abolished Flynn altogether. Tuxworth tried to transfer to the new seat of Goyder, but lost to the CLP's Terry McCarthy. Floreani tried to transfer to Araluen, but was heavily defeated by CLP incumbent Eric Poole. The NT Nationals faded away soon afterward.

== Electoral performance ==
Election	Leader	Votes	%	Seats	+/–	Position	Government
1987	Ian Tuxworth	9,058	17.79	1 / 25	▲1	▲3rd	Opposition
1990	Ian Tuxworth	3,060	4.7	0 / 25	▼1	3rd	Not in chamber
