= Results of the 1980 Northern Territory general election =

Northern Territory general election, 7 June 1980 Legislative Assembly << 1977–1983 >>
Enrolled voters	53,218				
Votes cast	41,484		Turnout	78.0%	+2.1%
Informal votes	1,328		Informal	3.2%	0.0%
Summary of votes by party
Party	Primary votes	%	Swing	Seats	Change
Country Liberal	28,637	50.0%	+9.9%	11	– 1
Labor	15,818	39.4%	+1.2%	7	+ 1
Independent	3,251	8.1%	–3.6%	1	± 0
Democrats	352	0.9%	+0.9%	0	± 0
Marijuana	272	0.7%	+0.7%	0	± 0
Progress	210	0.5%	–9.3%	0	± 0
Christian Democrat	188	0.5%	+0.5%	0	± 0
Total	40,156			19	

This is a list of electoral division results for the Northern Territory 1980 General Election in Australia.

== Results by electoral division ==
=== Alice Springs ===
1980 Northern Territory general election: Alice Springs
Party	Candidate	Votes	%	±%
Country Liberal	Denis Collins	999	43.8	−7.3
Independent	Rod Oliver	620	27.1	+27.1
Labor	Ted Hampton	505	22.1	−13.3
Independent	Dave Pollock	158	7.1	+7.1
Total formal votes		2,282	97.4	−0.5
Informal votes		60	2.6	+0.5
Turnout		2,342	78.0	+5.0
Two-candidate-preferred result
Country Liberal	Denis Collins	1,170	51.3	+0.2
Independent	Rod Oliver	1,112	48.7	+48.7
Country Liberal hold		Swing	+0.2	

=== Arnhem ===
1980 Northern Territory general election: Arnhem
Party	Candidate	Votes	%	±%
Labor	Bob Collins	1,346	78.4	+15.0
Country Liberal	Gatjil Djerrkura	299	17.4	−11.5
Marijuana	Mark McAlear	72	4.2	+4.2
Total formal votes		1,717	93.1	
Informal votes		128	6.9	
Turnout		1,845	66.5	
Labor hold		Swing	N/A	

- Preferences were not distributed.

=== Barkly ===
1980 Northern Territory general election: Barkly
Party	Candidate	Votes	%	±%
Country Liberal	Ian Tuxworth	1,018	54.8	+10.3
Labor	William Thomson	631	33.9	+7.0
Progress	Neville Andrews	210	11.3	−5.9
Total formal votes		1,859	93.0	
Informal votes		140	7.0	
Turnout		1,999	71.1	
Country Liberal hold		Swing		

- Preferences were not distributed.

=== Casuarina ===
1980 Northern Territory general election: Casuarina
Party	Candidate	Votes	%	±%
Country Liberal	Nick Dondas	1,696	56.2	+10.2
Labor	Dennis Bree	1,167	38.7	−8.0
Democrats	Klaus Roth	156	5.2	+5.2
Total formal votes		3,019	98.4	
Informal votes		48	1.6	
Turnout		3,067	81.8	
Country Liberal hold		Swing	N/A	

- Preferences were not distributed.

=== Elsey ===
1980 Northern Territory general election: Elsey
Party	Candidate	Votes	%	±%
Country Liberal	Les MacFarlane	879	45.0	+0.8
Labor	Maged Aboutaleb	580	29.7	+29.7
Independent	James Forscutt	188	9.6	+9.6
Independent	Patricia Davies	174	8.9	
Independent	Laurence Hughes	93	4.8	+4.8
Independent	R.T. Reilly	38	1.9	+1.9
Total formal votes		1,952	96.4	
Informal votes		73	3.6	
Turnout		2,025	74.6	
After distribution of preferences
Country Liberal	Les MacFarlane	1,014	51.9	
Labor	Maged Aboutaleb	655	33.6	
Independent	James Forscutt	283	14.5	
Country Liberal hold		Swing	N/A	

- Preferences were not distributed to completion.

=== Fannie Bay ===
1980 Northern Territory general election: Fannie Bay
Party	Candidate	Votes	%	±%
Labor	Pam O'Neil	896	51.0	+8.8
Country Liberal	Ella Stack	861	49.0	+14.0
Total formal votes		1,757	97.9	
Informal votes		37	2.1	
Turnout		1,794	88.3	
Labor hold		Swing		

=== Gillen ===
1980 Northern Territory general election: Gillen
Party	Candidate	Votes	%	±%
Country Liberal	Jim Robertson	1,539	68.7	+18.8
Labor	Rosalie McDonald	701	31.3	−7.7
Total formal votes		2,240	96.2	
Informal votes		88	3.8	
Turnout		2,328	81.3	
Country Liberal hold		Swing	N/A	

=== Jingili ===
1980 Northern Territory general election: Jingili
Party	Candidate	Votes	%	±%
Country Liberal	Paul Everingham	1,555	60.7	+25.6
Labor	Peter Hansen	858	33.5	−7.7
Democrats	Peter Read	151	5.9	+5.9
Total formal votes		2,564	98.2	
Informal votes		47	1.8	
Turnout		2,611	82.2	
Country Liberal hold		Swing	N/A	

- Preferences were not distributed.

=== Ludmilla ===
1980 Northern Territory general election: Ludmilla
Party	Candidate	Votes	%	±%
Country Liberal	Roger Steele	1,284	58.5	+11.6
Labor	Kay Spurr	739	33.7	−5.6
Independent	Roy Barden	173	7.9	+7.9
Total formal votes		2,196	97.8	
Informal votes		50	2.2	
Turnout		2,246	82.4	
Country Liberal hold		Swing	N/A	

- Preferences were not distributed.

=== MacDonnell ===
1980 Northern Territory general election: MacDonnell
Party	Candidate	Votes	%	±%
Labor	Neville Perkins	817	57.6	−3.2
Country Liberal	Rosalie Kunoth-Monks	601	42.4	+9.1
Total formal votes		1,418	95.8	
Informal votes		62	4.2	
Turnout		1,480	61.0	
Labor hold		Swing	N/A	

=== Millner ===
1980 Northern Territory general election: Millner
Party	Candidate	Votes	%	±%
Labor	Jon Isaacs	1,020	51.8	−5.8
Country Liberal	John Robinson	949	48.2	+15.0
Total formal votes		1,969	97.0	
Informal votes		60	3.0	
Turnout		2,029	84.8	
Labor hold		Swing	N/A	

=== Nhulunbuy ===
1980 Northern Territory general election: Nhulunbuy
Party	Candidate	Votes	%	±%
Labor	Dan Leo	809	43.2	+2.0
Country Liberal	Milton Ballantyne	613	32.7	−23.4
Independent	Michael O'Reilly	452	24.1	+24.1
Total formal votes		1,874	96.6	
Informal votes		65	3.4	
Turnout		1,939	77.9	
Two-party-preferred result
Labor	Dan Leo	1,020	54.4	
Country Liberal	Milton Ballantyne	854	45.6	
Labor gain from Country Liberal		Swing	N/A	

=== Nightcliff ===
1980 Northern Territory general election: Nightcliff
Party	Candidate	Votes	%	±%
Independent	Dawn Lawrie	1,066	51.5	−10.4
Country Liberal	Anne Amos	941	45.5	+20.1
Christian Democrats (NT)	Charles Coombs	63	3.0	+3.0
Total formal votes		2,070	97.2	
Informal votes		59	2.8	
Turnout		2,129	79.3	
Independent hold		Swing	N/A	

- Preferences were not distributed.

=== Port Darwin ===
1980 Northern Territory general election: Port Darwin
Party	Candidate	Votes	%	±%
Country Liberal	Tom Harris	885	57.3	+24.1
Labor	Jack Haritos	541	35.0	+7.2
Marijuana	Peter Taylor	73	4.7	+4.7
Democrats	Len Myles	45	2.9	+2.9
Total formal votes		1,544	97.9	
Informal votes		33	2.1	
Turnout		1,577	80.5	
Country Liberal hold		Swing	N/A	

- Preferences were not distributed.

=== Sanderson ===
1980 Northern Territory general election: Sanderson
Party	Candidate	Votes	%	±%
Labor	June D'Rozario	1,866	48.6	+3.0
Country Liberal	Daryl Manzie	1,851	48.2	+22.1
Christian Democrats (NT)	Ron Mann	125	3.3	+3.3
Total formal votes		3,842	98.2	
Informal votes		70	1.8	
Turnout		3,912	84.5	
Two-party-preferred result
Labor	June D'Rozario	1,930	50.2	−8.1
Country Liberal	Daryl Manzie	1,912	49.8	+8.1
Labor hold		Swing	−8.1	

=== Stuart ===
1980 Northern Territory general election: Stuart
Party	Candidate	Votes	%	±%
Country Liberal	Roger Vale	1,564	59.9	+7.8
Labor	John Thomas	1,047	40.1	−2.3
Total formal votes		2,611	98.0	
Informal votes		54	2.0	
Turnout		2,665	71.2	
Country Liberal hold		Swing	N/A	

=== Stuart Park ===
1980 Northern Territory general election: Stuart Park
Party	Candidate	Votes	%	±%
Country Liberal	Marshall Perron	952	56.1	+15.4
Labor	Peter Cavanagh	610	36.0	+5.3
Independent	Terry Wilson	79	4.7	+4.7
Marijuana	John Duffy	55	3.2	+3.2
Total formal votes		1,696	97.9	
Informal votes		36	2.1	
Turnout		1,732	78.8	
Country Liberal hold		Swing	N/A	

- Preferences were not distributed.

=== Tiwi ===
1980 Northern Territory general election: Tiwi
Party	Candidate	Votes	%	±%
Country Liberal	Noel Padgham-Purich	973	51.5	+17.8
Labor	Harry Maschke	813	43.1	+0.6
Marijuana	Jenny Smither	72	3.8	+3.8
Independent	Len McAlear	30	1.6	+1.6
Total formal votes		1,888	93.7	
Informal votes		127	6.3	
Turnout		2,015	82.5	
Country Liberal hold		Swing	N/A	

- Preferences were not distributed.

=== Victoria River ===
1980 Northern Territory general election: Victoria River
Party	Candidate	Votes	%	±%
Labor	Jack Doolan	872	52.6	+2.6
Country Liberal	John Millhouse	606	36.6	−6.1
Independent	Bronte Douglass	98	5.9	+5.9
Independent	Jack McCarthy	82	5.0	+5.0
Total formal votes		1,658	94.8	
Informal votes		91	5.2	
Turnout		1,749	72.6	
Labor hold		Swing	N/A	

- Preferences were not distributed.

== See also ==
- 1980 Northern Territory general election
- Members of the Northern Territory Legislative Assembly, 1980–1983
