= Electoral results for the division of Nhulunbuy =

This is a list of electoral results for the Electoral division of Nhulunbuy in Northern Territory elections.

== Members for Nhulunbuy ==
Member	Party	Term
Milton Ballantyne	Country Liberal	1974–1980
Dan Leo	Labor	1980–1990
Syd Stirling	Labor	1990–2008
Lynne Walker	Labor	2008–2016
Yingiya Mark Guyula	Independent	2016–2020

== Election results ==
=== Elections in the 2010s ===
2016 Northern Territory general election: Nhulunbuy
Party	Candidate	Votes	%	±%
Labor	Lynne Walker	1,502	44.4	−7.9
Independent	Yingiya Mark Guyula	1,404	41.5	+41.5
Country Liberal	Charlie Yunupingu	444	13.1	−16.4
Independent	Jackson Anni	35	1.0	+1.0
Total formal votes		3,385	97.9	+2.3
Informal votes		73	2.1	−2.3
Turnout		3,458	58.7	−7.3
Two-party-preferred result
Labor	Lynne Walker	2,026	65.9	+2.2
Country Liberal	Charlie Yunupingu	1,049	34.1	−2.2
Two-candidate-preferred result
Independent	Yingiya Mark Guyula	1,648	50.1	+50.1
Labor	Lynne Walker	1,640	49.9	−13.8
Independent gain from Labor		Swing	N/A	

2012 Northern Territory general election: Nhulunbuy
Party	Candidate	Votes	%	±%
Labor	Lynne Walker	1,554	55.0	−19.1
Country Liberal	Allen Fanning	641	22.7	−3.1
Independent	Kendall Trudgen	629	22.3	+22.3
Total formal votes		2,824	95.4	−0.8
Informal votes		136	4.6	+0.8
Turnout		2,960	62.7	+2.9
Two-party-preferred result
Labor	Lynne Walker	1,948	69.0	−5.2
Country Liberal	Allen Fanning	876	31.0	+5.2
Labor hold		Swing	−5.2	

=== Elections in the 2000s ===
2008 Northern Territory general election: Nhulunbuy
Party	Candidate	Votes	%	±%
Labor	Lynne Walker	1,936	74.2	−1.3
Country Liberal	Djuwalpi Marika	674	25.8	+1.3
Total formal votes		2,610	96.2	+0.3
Informal votes		103	3.8	−0.3
Turnout		2,713	59.9	
Labor hold		Swing	−1.3	

2005 Northern Territory general election: Nhulunbuy
Party	Candidate	Votes	%	±%
Labor	Syd Stirling	2,188	76.1	+21.1
Country Liberal	Peter Manning	689	23.9	−1.8
Total formal votes		2,877	95.9	+1.3
Informal votes		122	4.1	−1.3
Turnout		2,999	65.1	
Labor hold		Swing	+10.0	

2001 Northern Territory general election: Nhulunbuy
Party	Candidate	Votes	%	±%
Labor	Syd Stirling	1,471	54.9	−17.1
Country Liberal	Peter Manning	690	25.8	−2.1
Independent	David Mitchell	354	13.2	+13.2
One Nation	Gordon Davey	162	6.1	+6.1
Total formal votes		2,677	94.7	+0.8
Informal votes		151	5.3	−0.8
Turnout		2,828	66.4	
Two-party-preferred result
Labor	Syd Stirling	1,770	66.1	−6.0
Country Liberal	Peter Manning	907	33.9	+6.0
Labor hold		Swing	−6.0	

=== Elections in the 1990s ===
1997 Northern Territory general election: Nhulunbuy
Party	Candidate	Votes	%	±%
Labor	Syd Stirling	1,880	72.1	+17.5
Country Liberal	Richard Davey	728	27.9	−17.5
Total formal votes		2,608	93.9	
Informal votes		170	6.1	
Turnout		2,778	66.9	
Labor hold		Swing	+17.5	

1994 Northern Territory general election: Nhulunbuy
Party	Candidate	Votes	%	±%
Labor	Syd Stirling	1,350	54.6	−4.5
Country Liberal	Michael O'Shea	1,124	45.4	+4.5
Total formal votes		2,474	94.3	
Informal votes		149	5.7	
Turnout		2,623	70.6	
Labor hold		Swing	−4.5	

1990 Northern Territory general election: Nhulunbuy
Party	Candidate	Votes	%	±%
Labor	Syd Stirling	1,395	59.1	+13.2
Country Liberal	Susan McClure	964	40.9	+11.9
Total formal votes		2,359	96.1	
Informal votes		97	3.9	
Turnout		2,456	76.8	
Labor hold		Swing	−0.8	

=== Elections in the 1980s ===
1987 Northern Territory general election: Nhulunbuy
Party	Candidate	Votes	%	±%
Labor	Dan Leo	1,034	45.9	−5.3
Country Liberal	Pam Steele-Wareham	653	29.0	−19.8
Independent	Pat Ellis	429	19.0	+19.0
NT Nationals	Deane Crowhurst	139	6.2	+6.2
Total formal votes		2,255	97.4	
Informal votes		60	2.6	
Turnout		2,315	68.8	
Two-party-preferred result
Labor	Dan Leo	1,351	59.9	+4.9
Country Liberal	Pam Steele-Wareham	904	40.1	−4.9
Labor hold		Swing	+4.9	

1983 Northern Territory general election: Nhulunbuy
Party	Candidate	Votes	%	±%
Labor	Dan Leo	960	51.2	
Country Liberal	Kevin Graetz	916	48.8	
Total formal votes		1,876	97.2	
Informal votes		54	2.8	
Turnout		1,930	77.6	
Labor hold		Swing		

1980 Northern Territory general election: Nhulunbuy
Party	Candidate	Votes	%	±%
Labor	Dan Leo	809	43.2	+2.0
Country Liberal	Milton Ballantyne	613	32.7	−23.4
Independent	Michael O'Reilly	452	24.1	+24.1
Total formal votes		1,874	96.6	
Informal votes		65	3.4	
Turnout		1,939	77.9	
Two-party-preferred result
Labor	Dan Leo	1,020	54.4	
Country Liberal	Milton Ballantyne	854	45.6	
Labor gain from Country Liberal		Swing	N/A	

=== Elections in the 1970s ===
1977 Northern Territory general election: Nhulunbuy
Party	Candidate	Votes	%	±%
Country Liberal	Milton Ballantyne	874	56.1	
Labor	Denise Fincham	642	41.2	
Progress	Jacob De Vries	43	2.8	
Total formal votes		1,559	97.4	
Informal votes		41	2.6	
Turnout		1,600	75.4	
Country Liberal hold		Swing		

- Preferences were not distributed.

1974 Northern Territory general election: Nhulunbuy
Party	Candidate	Votes	%	±%
Country Liberal	Milton Ballantyne	658	48.3	
Labor	John Flynn	560	41.1	
Independent	William Hendry	144	10.6	
Total formal votes		1,362	96.4	
Informal votes		51	3.6	
Turnout		1,413	74.8	
Two-party-preferred result
Country Liberal	Milton Ballantyne	746	55.3	
Labor	John Flynn	602	44.7	
Country Liberal win		(new seat)		
