= Electoral results for the division of Nightcliff =

This is a list of electoral results for the electoral division of Nightcliff in Northern Territory elections.

== Members for Nightcliff ==
Member	Party	Term
Dawn Lawrie	Independent	1974–1983
Stephen Hatton	Country Liberal	1983–2001
Jane Aagaard	Labor	2001–2012
Natasha Fyles	Labor	2012–2024
Kat McNamara	Greens	2024–2026
Ed Smelt	Labor	2026–

== Election results ==
=== Elections in the 1970s ===
1974 Northern Territory general election: Nightcliff
Party	Candidate	Votes	%	±%
Independent	Dawn Lawrie	786	42.1	N/A
Country Liberal	Alfred Hooper	701	37.5	N/A
Labor	Edward Ellis	382	20.4	N/A
Total formal votes		1,869	96.9	N/A
Informal votes		60	3.1	N/A
Turnout		1,929	78.9	N/A
Two-candidate-preferred result
Independent	Dawn Lawrie	1,021	57.7	N/A
Country Liberal	Alfred Hooper	747	42.3	N/A
Independent win		(new seat)		

1977 Northern Territory general election: Nightcliff
Party	Candidate	Votes	%	±%
Independent	Dawn Lawrie	1,110	61.9	+19.8
Country Liberal	Ronald Nobbs	455	25.4	−12.1
Progress	Uldis Blums	228	12.7	+12.7
Total formal votes		1,793	98.0	N/A
Informal votes		37	2.0	N/A
Turnout		1,830	80.5	N/A
Independent hold		Swing	N/A	

- Preferences were not distributed.

=== Elections in the 1980s ===
1980 Northern Territory general election: Nightcliff
Party	Candidate	Votes	%	±%
Independent	Dawn Lawrie	1,066	51.5	−10.4
Country Liberal	Anne Amos	941	45.5	+20.1
Christian Democrats (NT)	Charles Coombs	63	3.0	+3.0
Total formal votes		2,070	97.2	N/A
Informal votes		59	2.8	N/A
Turnout		2,129	79.3	N/A
Independent hold		Swing	N/A	

- Preferences were not distributed.

1983 Northern Territory general election: Nightcliff
Party	Candidate	Votes	%	±%
Country Liberal	Stephen Hatton	1,069	54.2	+8.7
Independent	Dawn Lawrie	613	31.1	−20.4
Labor	Colin Dyer	292	14.8	+14.8
Total formal votes		1,974	98.7	N/A
Informal votes		27	1.3	N/A
Turnout		2,001	82.7	N/A
Country Liberal gain from Independent		Swing	N/A	

- Preferences were not distributed.

1987 Northern Territory general election: Nightcliff
Party	Candidate	Votes	%	±%
Country Liberal	Stephen Hatton	1,181	58.5	+4.3
Labor	John Rowell	567	28.1	+14.3
NT Nationals	Brian Brent	272	13.5	+13.5
Total formal votes		2,020	96.2	N/A
Informal votes		79	3.8	N/A
Turnout		2,099	67.7	N/A
Two-party-preferred result
Country Liberal	Stephen Hatton	1,381	68.4	+3.4
Labor	John Rowell	630	31.6	−3.4
Country Liberal hold		Swing	+3.4	

=== Elections in the 1990s ===
1990 Northern Territory general election: Nightcliff
Party	Candidate	Votes	%	±%
Country Liberal	Stephen Hatton	1,573	60.4	+1.9
Labor	David Pettigrew	595	22.8	−5.1
Greens	John Dunham	436	16.7	+16.7
Total formal votes		2,604	97.5	N/A
Informal votes		68	2.5	N/A
Turnout		2,672	81.6	N/A
Two-party-preferred result
Country Liberal	Stephen Hatton	1,617	62.1	−3.0
Labor	David Pettigrew	987	37.9	+3.0
Country Liberal hold		Swing	−3.0	

1994 Northern Territory general election: Nightcliff
Party	Candidate	Votes	%	±%
Country Liberal	Stephen Hatton	1,692	56.3	−4.1
Labor	Paul Henderson	1,135	37.8	+15.3
Democrats	Robert Adams	180	6.0	+6.0
Total formal votes		3,007	97.1	N/A
Informal votes		89	2.9	N/A
Turnout		3,096	84.3	N/A
Two-party-preferred result
Country Liberal	Stephen Hatton	1,792	59.6	−2.5
Labor	Paul Henderson	1,215	40.4	+2.5
Country Liberal hold		Swing	−2.5	

1997 Northern Territory general election: Nightcliff
Party	Candidate	Votes	%	±%
Country Liberal	Stephen Hatton	1,792	49.1	−7.2
Labor	Paul Henderson	1,411	38.7	+1.0
Independent	Betty McCleary	360	9.9	+9.9
Independent	Theo Katapodis	84	2.3	+2.3
Total formal votes		3,647	97.0	N/A
Informal votes		114	3.0	N/A
Turnout		3,761	87.3	N/A
Two-party-preferred result
Country Liberal	Stephen Hatton	1,991	54.6	−4.4
Labor	Paul Henderson	1,656	45.4	+4.4
Country Liberal hold		Swing	−4.4	

=== Elections in the 2000s ===
2001 Northern Territory general election: Nightcliff
Party	Candidate	Votes	%	±%
Labor	Jane Aagaard	1,898	51.9	+13.3
Country Liberal	Jason Hatton	1,485	40.6	−8.6
Socialist Alliance	Gary Meyerhoff	157	4.3	+4.3
Territory Alliance Party	Peter Ivinson	114	3.1	+3.1
Total formal votes		3,654	96.9	N/A
Informal votes		118	3.1	N/A
Turnout		3,772	8.7	N/A
Two-party-preferred result
Labor	Jane Aagaard	2,088	57.1	+11.7
Country Liberal	Jason Hatton	1,566	42.9	−11.7
Labor gain from Country Liberal		Swing	+11.7	

2005 Northern Territory general election: Nightcliff
Party	Candidate	Votes	%	±%
Labor	Jane Aagaard	1,815	49.8	−2.1
Country Liberal	Anthony Reiter	1,063	29.2	−11.4
Greens	Ilana Eldridge	571	15.7	+15.7
Independent	Andrew Arthur	134	3.7	+3.7
Independent	Stuart Highway	61	1.7	+1.7
Total formal votes		3,644	97.5	N/A
Informal votes		92	2.5	N/A
Turnout		3,736	84.2	N/A
Two-party-preferred result
Labor	Jane Aagaard	2,385	65.5	+8.4
Country Liberal	Anthony Reiter	1,259	34.5	−8.4
Labor hold		Swing	+8.4	

2008 Northern Territory general election: Nightcliff
Party	Candidate	Votes	%	±%
Labor	Jane Aagaard	1,625	43.0	−6.8
Country Liberal	Peter Manning	1,257	33.3	+4.1
Greens	Emma Young	896	23.7	+8.0
Total formal votes		3,778	96.9	N/A
Informal votes		119	3.1	N/A
Turnout		3,897	78.8	N/A
Two-party-preferred result
Labor	Jane Aagaard	2,293	60.7	−4.7
Country Liberal	Peter Manning	1,485	39.3	+4.7
Labor hold		Swing	−5.0	

=== Elections in the 2010s ===
2012 Northern Territory general election: Nightcliff
Party	Candidate	Votes	%	±%
Labor	Natasha Fyles	1,389	35.7	−7.3
Country Liberal	Kim Loveday	1,260	32.4	−0.9
Independent	Stuart Blanch	722	18.5	+18.5
Greens	Owen Gale	263	6.8	−17.0
Independent	Peter Rudge	170	4.4	+4.4
Sex Party	Felicity Wardle	74	1.9	+1.9
Independent	Andrew Arthur	16	0.4	+0.4
Total formal votes		3,894	96.6	N/A
Informal votes		136	3.4	N/A
Turnout		4,030	84.0	N/A
Two-party-preferred result
Labor	Natasha Fyles	2,304	59.2	−1.5
Country Liberal	Kim Loveday	1,590	40.8	+1.5
Labor hold		Swing	N/A	

2016 Northern Territory general election: Nightcliff
Party	Candidate	Votes	%	±%
Labor	Natasha Fyles	2,485	60.9	+25.3
Country Liberal	Ted Dunstan	868	21.3	−11.1
Greens	Matt Haubrick	726	17.8	+11.0
Total formal votes		4,079	98.1	N/A
Informal votes		78	1.9	N/A
Turnout		4,157	77.8	N/A
Two-party-preferred result
Labor	Natasha Fyles	3,049	76.9	+17.8
Country Liberal	Ted Dunstan	918	23.1	−17.8
Labor hold		Swing	N/A	

=== Elections in the 2020s ===
2020 Northern Territory general election: Nightcliff
Party	Candidate	Votes	%	±%
Labor	Natasha Fyles	2,353	53.2	−8.0
Country Liberal	Steve Doherty	836	18.9	−2.4
Greens	Billee McGinley	822	18.6	+1.7
Territory Alliance	Melita McKinnon	336	7.6	+7.6
Animal Justice	Shelley Landmark	78	1.8	+1.2
Total formal votes		4,425	98.0	N/A
Informal votes		90	2.0	N/A
Turnout		4,515	80.3	N/A
Two-party-preferred result
Labor	Natasha Fyles	3,286	74.3	−2.5
Country Liberal	Steve Doherty	1,139	25.7	+2.5
Labor hold		Swing	−2.5	

2024 Northern Territory general election: Nightcliff
Party	Candidate	Votes	%	±%
Labor	Natasha Fyles	1,467	32.8	−20.0
Country Liberal	Helen Secretary	1,060	23.7	+5.0
Greens	Kat McNamara	981	22.0	+3.2
Independent	Mililma May	858	19.2	+19.2
Independent	George Mamouzellos	102	2.3	+2.3
Total formal votes		4,468	97.2	
Informal votes		127	2.8	
Turnout		4,595	81.3	
Estimated two-party-preferred result (Note: By Antony Green.)
Labor	Natasha Fyles	2,908	65.1	−9.0
Country Liberal	Helen Secretary	1,559	34.9	+9.0
Two-candidate-preferred result
Greens	Kat McNamara	2,252	50.4	+50.4
Labor	Natasha Fyles	2,216	49.6	−24.5
Greens gain from Labor				

2026 Nightcliff by-election
Party	Candidate	Votes	%	±%
Greens	Suki Dorras-Walker	1,298	33.9	+12.0
Labor	Ed Smelt	1,095	28.6	−4.2
Country Liberal	Anjan Paudel	765	20.0	−3.7
Independent	Phil Scott	668	17.5	+17.5
Total formal votes		3,826	97.8	+0.5
Informal votes		87	2.2	−0.5
Turnout		3,913	65.9	−10.8
Two-candidate-preferred result
Labor	Ed Smelt	1,973	51.6	+2.0
Greens	Suki Dorras-Walker	1,853	48.4	−2.0
Labor gain from Greens		Swing	+2.0	
