= Electoral results for the division of Mulka =

Australian electoral results

This is a list of electoral results for the electoral division of Mulka, of the Northern Territory Legislative Assembly in Australia.

== Members for Mulka ==
Member	Party	Term
Yingiya Mark Guyula	Independent	2020–present
Yiwarr McGrath	Labor	2026-present

== Election results ==
2020 Northern Territory general election: Mulka
Party	Candidate	Votes	%	±%
Independent	Yingiya Mark Guyula	2,252	55.0	+13.5
Labor	Lynne Walker	1,843	45.0	+0.6
Total formal votes		4,095	97.7	N/A
Informal votes		96	2.3	N/A
Turnout		4,191	68.4	N/A
Independent hold		Swing	+13.5	

2024 Northern Territory general election: Mulka
Party	Candidate	Votes	%	±%
Independent	Yingiya Mark Guyula	2,299	75.2	+20.1
Country Liberal	Allen Fanning	758	24.8	+24.8
Total formal votes		3,057	97.1	−0.6
Informal votes		90	2.9	+0.6
Turnout		3,147	46.0	
Independent hold		Swing	+20.1	

2026 Mulka by-election
Party	Candidate	Votes	%	±%
Labor	Yiwarr McGrath	1,960	77.3	+77.3
Independent	Andrew Blamey	574	22.7	+22.7
Total formal votes		2,534	97.2	+0.1
Informal votes		72	2.8	−0.1
Turnout		2,606	38.0	−8.0
Labor gain from Independent				
