= Members of the Northern Territory Legislative Assembly, 2024–2028 =

This is a list of members of the Northern Territory Legislative Assembly from 2024 to 2028, as elected at the 2024 election and subsequent by-elections.

Name	Party	Electorate	Term in office
Marie-Clare Boothby	CLP	Brennan	2020–present
Manuel Brown	ALP	Arafura	2023–present
Joshua Burgoyne	CLP	Braitling	2020–present
Robyn Cahill	CLP	Port Darwin	2024–present
Oly Carlson	CLP	Wanguri	2024–present
Jinson Charls	CLP	Sanderson	2024–present
Justine Davis	Independent	Johnston	2024–present
Steve Edgington	CLP	Barkly	2020–present
Hon Lia Finocchiaro	CLP	Spillett	2012–present
Yingiya Mark Guyula ^{[1]}	Independent	Mulka	2016–2026
Jo Hersey	CLP	Katherine	2020–present
Clinton Howe	CLP	Drysdale	2024–present
Matthew Kerle	CLP	Blain	2024–present
Robyn Lambley	Independent	Araluen	2010–present
Andrew Mackay	CLP	Goyder	2024–present
Hon Gerard Maley	CLP	Nelson	2020–present
Yiwarr McGrath	ALP	Mulka	2026–present
Kat McNamara	Greens	Nightcliff	2024–2026
Brian O'Gallagher	CLP	Karama	2024–present
Khoda Patel	CLP	Casuarina	2024–present
Chansey Paech	ALP	Gwoja	2016–present
Tanzil Rahman	CLP	Fong Lim	2024–present
Ed Smelt	ALP	Nightcliff	2026–present
Selena Uibo	ALP	Arnhem	2016–present
Bill Yan	CLP	Namatjira	2020–present
Dheran Young	ALP	Daly	2021–present
Laurie Zio	CLP	Fannie Bay	2024–present

^{1} Yingiya Mark Guyula resigned from the assembly on 19 August 2026.

== See also ==
- 2024 Northern Territory general election
