= 2026 Mulka by-election =

By-election in the Northern Territory, Australia

- 12 September 2026

Electoral division of Mulka in the Northern Territory Legislative Assembly
- Registered: 6,863
	First party	Second party
		IND
Candidate	Yiwarr McGrath	Andrew Blamey
Party	Labor	Independent
Primary vote	1,960	574
Percentage	77.3%	22.7%
Swing	▲77.3%	▲22.7%
MLA before election
Yingiya Mark Guyula
Independent
Elected MLA
Yiwarr McGrath
Labor

A by-election for the electoral division of Mulka in the Northern Territory Legislative Assembly is being held on 12 September 2026, following the resignation of Independent MLA Yingiya Mark Guyula.

The by-election was called for Labor by the ABC at 8:00 p.m. local time (2 hours after polls closed), with Yiwarr McGrath claiming victory for the party.

== Background ==
=== Former member ===
Guyula resigned from the Northern Territory Legislative Assembly on 19 August 2026, citing his inability to "sit opposite a government who are not willing to listen or form partnerships" and in particular, the government's introduction of "too many laws that are dehumanising, oppressing and destroying our communities and our people". Additionally, he highlighted some personal "health concerns" and a desire to "make space for someone ... with new energy". He had served as the MLA for Mulka and its precursor Nhulunbuy since winning it from Labor by 8 votes in 2016.

=== Key dates ===
- Issue of writ — 20 August 2026
- Nominations open — 20 August 2026
- Electoral roll closes — 21 August 2026; 5 pm
- Nominations close — 27 August 2026; 12 pm
- Declaration of nominations and ballot draw — 27 August 2026
- Postal vote mail-out commences — 31 August 2026
- Early voting begins — 31 August 2026
- Mobile voting begins — 31 August 2026
- Overseas postal voting despatch closes — 8 September 2026; 5 pm
- All postal voting despatch closes — 10 September 2026; 5 pm
- Early voting closes — 11 September 2026; 6 pm
- Election day — 12 September 2026
- Election day voting closes — 12 September 2026; 6 pm
- Mobile voting closes — 12 September 2026; 6 pm
- Count begins — 12 September 2026; 6 pm
- Recheck of counts — 14 September 2026; 9 am
- Verification of declaration votes — 14 September 2026; 9 am
- Postal votes count begins — 14 September 2026; 9 am
- Postal vote deadline — 25 September 2026; 12 pm
- Final distribution of preferences — 25 September 2026; 12 pm
- Results declared — 28 September 2026; 10 am
- Return of writ — 21 October 2026
- Last day to dispute validity of election — 9 November 2026

=== Previous results ===
2024 Northern Territory general election: Mulka
Party	Candidate	Votes	%	±%
Independent	Yingiya Mark Guyula	2,299	75.2	+20.1
Country Liberal	Allen Fanning	758	24.8	+24.8
Total formal votes		3,057	97.1	−0.6
Informal votes		90	2.9	+0.6
Turnout		3,147	46.0	
Independent hold		Swing	+20.1	

== Candidates ==
Candidates are listed in ballot order.

Party	Candidate	Background
Independent	Andrew Blamey	Library program assistant & former construction worker
Labor	Yiwarr McGrath	Registered nurse & health researcher

=== Labor ===
Territory Labor preselected 2021 Northern Territory Young Australian of the Year Yiwarr McGrath on 25 August. McGrath is a Yolŋu registered nurse and lives in Elcho Island.

=== Independent ===
Independent candidate Andrew Blamey launched his campaign on 27 August. He lives in Nhulunbuy and works in the "human services sector" across "homeslessness, youth justice" and most recently has been working as a library program assistant for East Arnhem Regional Council, having formally worked in the construction industry.

=== Country Liberal Party ===
The Country Liberal Party chose not to run a candidate, calling the by election a "disruption" and stating that they were "more focused on taking the fight" to the federal Labor government and "planning for the 2028 Territory election".

== Results ==
2026 Mulka by-election
Party	Candidate	Votes	%	±%
Labor	Yiwarr McGrath	1,960	77.3	+77.3
Independent	Andrew Blamey	574	22.7	+22.7
Total formal votes		2,534	97.2	+0.1
Informal votes		72	2.8	−0.1
Turnout		2,606	38.0	−8.0
Labor gain from Independent				

=== Results by polling place ===
Polling place	Andrew Blamey		Labor		Formal		Informal		Turnout	
Polling place	Votes	%	Votes	%	Votes	%	Votes	%	Total	%
Nhulunbuy pre-poll	385	37.5%	641	62.5%	1,026	97.5%	26	2.5%	1,052	40.4%
Darwin pre-poll	4	9.5%	38	90.5%	42	100%	0	0%	42	1.6%
Nhulunbuy	102	58%	74	42%	176	95.7%	8	4.3%	184	7.1%
Mobile Team 1	36	5.7%	598	94.3%	634	96.6%	22	3.4%	656	25.2%
Mobile Team 2	14	2.6%	520	97.4%	534	97.3%	15	2.7%	549	21.1%
Postal	30	40.5%	44	59.5%	74	98.7%	1	1.3%	75	2.9%
Declaration	3	6.3%	45	93.8%	48	100%	0	0%	48	1.8%

== See also ==
- List of Northern Territory by-elections
- 2026 Nightcliff by-election
