= Results of the 2016 Northern Territory general election =

This is a list of electoral division results for the Northern Territory 2016 general election.

== Overall results ==
Northern Territory general election, 27 August 2016 Legislative Assembly << 2012–
Enrolled voters	135,506				
Votes cast	100,304		Turnout	74.0	−2.9
Informal votes	2,005		Informal	2.0	−1.2
Summary of votes by party
Party	Primary votes	%	Swing	Seats	Change
Labor	41,476	42.2	+5.7	18	+11
Country Liberal	31,263	31.8	−18.8	2	−9
1 Territory	3,520	3.6	+3.6	0	±0
Greens	2,817	2.9	−0.4	0	±0
Shooters and Fishers	523	0.5	+0.5	0	±0
Citizens Electoral Council	189	0.2	+0.2	0	±0
Independent	18,511	18.8	+12.8	5	−2
Total	98,299			25	
Two-party-preferred
Labor		58.5	+14.3		
Country Liberal		41.5	−14.3		

Independents: Robyn Lambley (Araluen), Terry Mills (Blain), Kezia Purick (Goyder), Gerry Wood (Nelson), Yingiya Mark Guyula (Nhulunbuy)

== Results by electoral division ==
=== Arafura ===
Northern Territory general election, 2016: Arafura
Party	Candidate	Votes	%	±%
Labor	Lawrence Costa	1,087	46.3	+11.7
Country Liberal	Francis Xavier Kurrupuwu	903	38.4	–5.5
1 Territory	Jon Lotu	284	12.1	+12.1
Independent	Tristan Mungatopi	75	3.2	+3.2
Total formal votes		2,349	98.6	+3.1
Informal votes		34	1.4	−3.1
Turnout		2,383	49.2	−11.2
Two-party-preferred result
Labor	Lawrence Costa	1,234	54.7	+7.2
Country Liberal	Francis Xavier Kurrupuwu	1,020	45.3	−7.2
Labor gain from Country Liberal		Swing	+7.2	

=== Araluen ===
Northern Territory general election, 2016: Araluen
Party	Candidate	Votes	%	±%
Independent	Robyn Lambley	1,835	38.9	+38.9
Country Liberal	Stephen Brown	1,720	36.4	−28.5
Labor	Adam Findlay	1,165	24.7	+2.9
Total formal votes		4,720	97.8	+1.1
Informal votes		106	2.2	−1.1
Turnout		4,826	82.5	−1.1
Notional two-party-preferred count
Country Liberal	Stephen Brown	2,308	55.3	−14.7
Labor	Adam Findlay	1,868	44.7	+14.7
Two-candidate-preferred result
Independent	Robyn Lambley	2,604	58.2	+58.2
Country Liberal	Stephen Brown	1,873	41.8	−28.1
Independent gain from Country Liberal		Swing	N/A	

=== Arnhem ===
Northern Territory general election, 2016: Arnhem
Party	Candidate	Votes	%	±%
Labor	Selena Uibo	1,565	54.1	+9.5
Country Liberal	Ian Gumbula	804	27.8	−25.9
Independent	Lance Lawrence	211	7.3	+7.3
1 Territory	James Gaykamangu	197	6.8	+6.8
Independent	Larisa Lee	117	4.0	+4.0
Total formal votes		2,894	97.4	+1.1
Informal votes		78	2.6	−1.1
Turnout		2,972	57.6	+0.2
Two-party-preferred result
Labor	Selena Uibo	1,777	64.3	+18.6
Country Liberal	Ian Gumbula	985	35.7	−18.6
Labor gain from Country Liberal		Swing	+18.6	

=== Barkly ===
Northern Territory general election, 2016: Barkly
Party	Candidate	Votes	%	±%
Labor	Gerry McCarthy	1,387	43.1	−2.0
Independent	Elliot McAdam	869	27.1	+27.1
Country Liberal	Tony Jack	595	18.5	−17.7
Independent	Jack Green	367	11.4	+11.4
Total formal votes		3,218	98.4	+2.1
Informal votes		53	1.6	−2.1
Turnout		3,271	63.1	−4.0
Notional two-party-preferred count
Labor	Gerry McCarthy	1,864	62.2	+4.7
Country Liberal	Tony Jack	1,132	37.8	−4.7
Two-candidate-preferred result
Labor	Gerry McCarthy	1,739	58.0	+0.4
Independent	Elliot McAdam	1,260	42.0	+42.0
Labor hold		Swing	N/A	

=== Blain ===
Northern Territory general election, 2016: Blain
Party	Candidate	Votes	%	±%
Labor	Damian Hale	1,597	37.3	+5.3
Independent	Terry Mills	1,341	31.3	+31.3
Country Liberal	Marie-Clare Boothby	1,102	25.7	−37.9
Independent	Gregory Knowles	241	5.6	+5.6
Total formal votes		4,280	97.3	+0.6
Informal votes		121	2.7	−0.6
Turnout		4,402	78.9	+16.4
Notional two-party-preferred count
Labor	Damian Hale	2,056	54.8	+20.0
Country Liberal	Marie-Clare Boothby	1,693	45.2	−20.0
Two-candidate-preferred result
Independent	Terry Mills	1,953	51.4	+51.4
Labor	Damian Hale	1,849	48.6	+13.8
Independent gain from Country Liberal		Swing	N/A	

=== Braitling ===
Northern Territory general election, 2016: Braitling
Party	Candidate	Votes	%	±%
Country Liberal	Adam Giles	2,091	42.8	−20.0
Labor	Dale Wakefield	1,601	32.8	+14.3
Greens	Dalton Dupuy	493	10.1	+0.8
Independent	Phil Walcott	332	6.8	+6.8
Independent	Eli Melky	211	4.3	+4.3
Independent	Jane Clark	125	2.6	+2.6
Independent	Alfred Gould	36	0.7	+0.7
Total formal votes		4,889	98.3	+0.9
Informal votes		84	1.7	−0.9
Turnout		4,973	82.9	−7.9
Two-party-preferred result
Labor	Dale Wakefield	2,314	50.3	+19.9
Country Liberal	Adam Giles	2,287	49.7	−19.9
Labor gain from Country Liberal		Swing	+19.9	

=== Brennan ===
Northern Territory general election, 2016: Brennan
Party	Candidate	Votes	%	±%
Labor	Tony Sievers	1,939	48.0	+12.0
Country Liberal	Peter Chandler	1,784	44.2	−19.8
1 Territory	Dorothy Fox	314	7.8	+7.8
Total formal votes		4,037	97.1	−0.6
Informal votes		122	2.9	+0.6
Turnout		4,159	79.9	+4.8
Two-party-preferred result
Labor	Tony Sievers	2,077	52.6	+16.6
Country Liberal	Peter Chandler	1,869	47.4	−16.6
Labor gain from Country Liberal		Swing	+16.6	

=== Casuarina ===
Northern Territory general election, 2016: Casuarina
Party	Candidate	Votes	%	±%
Labor	Lauren Moss	2,688	61.3	+2.5
Country Liberal	Giovanna Webb	1,694	38.7	−2.5
Total formal votes		4,382	97.4	−0.5
Informal votes		117	2.6	+0.5
Turnout		4,499	82.4	+4.3
Labor hold		Swing	+2.5	

=== Daly ===
Northern Territory general election, 2016: Daly
Party	Candidate	Votes	%	±%
Country Liberal	Gary Higgins	1,583	42.4	−9.2
Labor	Anthony Venes	1,361	36.5	−2.1
1 Territory	Joan Growden	246	6.6	+6.6
Independent	Allan McKay	166	4.5	+4.5
Independent	Regina McCarthy	128	3.4	+3.4
Independent	Kevin Wanganeen	119	3.2	+3.2
Independent	Thong Sum Lee	90	2.4	+2.4
Citizens Electoral Council	Ian Barry	37	1.0	+1.0
Total formal votes		3,730	97.5	+3.1
Informal votes		94	2.5	−3.1
Turnout		3,824	71.0	−2.4
Two-party-preferred result
Country Liberal	Gary Higgins	1,763	52.1	−3.1
Labor	Anthony Venes	1,622	47.9	+3.1
Country Liberal hold		Swing	−3.1	

=== Drysdale ===
Northern Territory general election, 2016: Drysdale
Party	Candidate	Votes	%	±%
Labor	Eva Lawler	1,593	41.0	+9.1
Country Liberal	Ben Hosking	1,341	34.5	−20.3
Independent	Lyle Mackay	395	10.2	+10.2
Greens	Hayden Bray	250	6.4	+6.4
1 Territory	David Cartwright	165	4.2	+4.2
Independent	Margy Kerle	141	3.6	+3.6
Total formal votes		3,885	97.2	+0.5
Informal votes		111	2.8	−0.5
Turnout		3,996	73.2	+0.9
Two-party-preferred result
Labor	Eva Lawler	1,964	55.2	+16.6
Country Liberal	Ben Hosking	1,597	44.8	−16.6
Labor gain from Country Liberal		Swing	+16.6	

=== Fannie Bay ===
Northern Territory general election, 2016: Fannie Bay
Party	Candidate	Votes	%	±%
Labor	Michael Gunner	2,539	59.3	+11.1
Country Liberal	Karen Brown	1,393	32.5	−8.3
1 Territory	Greg Strettles	349	8.2	+8.2
Total formal votes		4,281	97.8	+0.7
Informal votes		95	2.2	−0.7
Turnout		4,376	78.0	+4.7
Two-party-preferred result
Labor	Michael Gunner	2,688	64.2	+7.8
Country Liberal	Karen Brown	1,499	35.8	−7.8
Labor hold		Swing	+7.8	

=== Fong Lim ===
Northern Territory general election, 2016: Fong Lim
Party	Candidate	Votes	%	±%
Labor	Jeff Collins	1,802	45.3	+3.3
Country Liberal	Tim Dixon	1,439	36.1	−11.4
Independent	Ilana Eldridge	384	9.6	+9.6
1 Territory	Sue Fraser-Adams	356	8.9	+8.9
Total formal votes		3,981	98.2	+1.0
Informal votes		74	1.8	−1.0
Turnout		4,055	75.8	+3.9
Two-party-preferred result
Labor	Jeff Collins	2,171	57.8	+7.9
Country Liberal	Tim Dixon	1,588	42.2	−7.9
Labor gain from Country Liberal		Swing	+7.9	

=== Goyder ===
Northern Territory general election, 2016: Goyder
Party	Candidate	Votes	%	±%
Independent	Kezia Purick	2,496	55.0	+55.0
Country Liberal	Carolyn Reynolds	919	20.2	−41.4
Labor	Mick Taylor	860	18.9	−11.0
Greens	Billee McGinley	188	4.1	+3.7
Citizens Electoral Council	Peter Flynn	76	1.7	+1.7
Total formal votes		4,539	98.3	+1.5
Informal votes		78	1.7	−1.5
Turnout		4,617	82.6	−3.4
Notional two-party-preferred count
Labor	Mick Taylor	1,679	52.0	+18.0
Country Liberal	Carolyn Reynolds	1,551	48.0	−18.0
Two-candidate-preferred result
Independent	Kezia Purick	3,109	75.3	+75.3
Country Liberal	Carolyn Reynolds	1,020	24.7	−41.3
Independent gain from Country Liberal		Swing	N/A	

=== Johnston ===
Northern Territory general election, 2016: Johnston
Party	Candidate	Votes	%	±%
Labor	Ken Vowles	2,019	51.4	+3.6
Country Liberal	Steven Klose	1,234	31.4	−7.6
Greens	Melanie Ross	676	17.2	+9.3
Total formal votes		3,929	98.1	+1.6
Informal votes		77	1.9	−1.6
Turnout		4,006	80.4	+0.8
Two-party-preferred result
Labor	Ken Vowles	2,453	64.7	+8.1
Country Liberal	Steven Klose	1,339	35.3	−8.1
Labor hold		Swing	+8.1	

=== Karama ===
Northern Territory general election, 2016: Karama
Party	Candidate	Votes	%	±%
Labor	Ngaree Ah Kit	1,373	34.0	−18.7
Independent	Delia Lawrie	1,316	32.6	+32.6
Country Liberal	Jarred Ilett	923	22.8	−18.7
1 Territory	Edward D'Solo	249	6.2	+6.2
Independent	Trevor Jenkins	79	2.0	+2.0
Independent	Sonja Jebbink	56	1.4	+1.4
Independent	Jimmy Gimini	44	1.1	+1.1
Total formal votes		4,040	97.7	+1.3
Informal votes		93	2.3	−1.3
Turnout		4,133	79.1	−1.1
Notional two-party-preferred count
Labor	Ngaree Ah Kit	2,037	63.0	+6.6
Country Liberal	Jarred Ilett	1,196	37.0	−6.6
Two-candidate-preferred result
Labor	Ngaree Ah Kit	1,702	50.8	−5.6
Independent	Delia Lawrie	1,647	49.2	+49.2
Labor hold		Swing	N/A	

=== Katherine ===
Northern Territory general election, 2016: Katherine
Party	Candidate	Votes	%	±%
Country Liberal	Willem Westra van Holthe	1,434	35.2	−30.9
Labor	Sandra Nelson	1,274	31.3	+10.4
1 Territory	Braedon Earley	744	18.3	+18.3
Independent	Dean David	285	7.0	+7.0
Shooters and Fishers	Chris Righton	278	6.8	+6.8
Independent	Leon Cellier	58	1.4	+1.4
Total formal votes		4,073	98.4	+0.2
Informal votes		66	1.6	−0.2
Turnout		4,139	78.3	−5.8
Two-party-preferred result
Labor	Sandra Nelson	1,843	50.5	+22.7
Country Liberal	Willem Westra van Holthe	1,810	49.5	−22.7
Labor gain from Country Liberal		Swing	+22.7	

=== Namatjira ===
Northern Territory general election, 2016: Namatjira
Party	Candidate	Votes	%	±%
Labor	Chansey Paech	1,442	46.3	+21.5
Country Liberal	Heidi Williams	1,024	32.9	−33.2
Greens	Vincent Forrester	484	15.5	+13.8
Independent	Alan Keeling	165	5.3	+5.3
Total formal votes		3,115	98.2	+2.7
Informal votes		56	1.8	−2.7
Turnout		3,171	58.3	−4.9
Two-party-preferred result
Labor	Chansey Paech	1,742	58.5	+29.2
Country Liberal	Heidi Williams	1,236	41.5	−29.2
Labor gain from Country Liberal		Swing	+29.2	

=== Nelson ===
Northern Territory general election, 2016: Nelson
Party	Candidate	Votes	%	±%
Independent	Gerry Wood	2,804	60.5	+11.5
Country Liberal	Gerard Maley	1,029	22.2	−18.7
Labor	Kirsty Hunt	510	11.0	+1.9
Shooters and Fishers	Marty Reinhold	245	5.3	+5.3
Citizens Electoral Council	Brigid McCullough	47	1.0	+1.0
Total formal votes		4,635	98.7	+0.7
Informal votes		61	1.3	−0.7
Turnout		4,696	80.4	+2.6
Notional two-party-preferred count
Country Liberal	Gerard Maley	1,803	57.0	−10.1
Labor	Kirsty Hunt	1,360	43.0	+10.1
Two-candidate-preferred result
Independent	Gerry Wood	3,209	73.0	+17.5
Country Liberal	Gerard Maley	1,189	27.0	−17.5
Independent hold		Swing	+17.5	

=== Nhulunbuy ===
Northern Territory general election, 2016: Nhulunbuy
Party	Candidate	Votes	%	±%
Labor	Lynne Walker	1,502	44.4	−7.9
Independent	Yingiya Mark Guyula	1,404	41.5	+41.5
Country Liberal	Charlie Yunupingu	444	13.1	−16.4
Independent	Jackson Anni	35	1.0	+1.0
Total formal votes		3,385	97.9	+2.3
Informal votes		73	2.1	−2.3
Turnout		3,458	58.7	−7.3
Notional two-party-preferred count
Labor	Lynne Walker	2,026	65.9	+2.2
Country Liberal	Charlie Yunupingu	1,049	34.1	−2.2
Two-candidate-preferred result
Independent	Yingiya Mark Guyula	1,648	50.1	+50.1
Labor	Lynne Walker	1,640	49.9	−13.8
Independent gain from Labor		Swing	N/A	

=== Nightcliff ===
Northern Territory general election, 2016: Nightcliff
Party	Candidate	Votes	%	±%
Labor	Natasha Fyles	2,485	60.9	+25.3
Country Liberal	Ted Dunstan	868	21.3	−11.1
Greens	Matt Haubrick	726	17.8	+11.0
Total formal votes		4,079	98.1	+1.4
Informal votes		78	1.9	−1.4
Turnout		4,157	77.8	+0.9
Two-party-preferred result
Labor	Natasha Fyles	3,049	76.9	+17.8
Country Liberal	Ted Dunstan	918	23.1	−17.8
Labor hold		Swing	+17.8	

=== Port Darwin ===
Northern Territory general election, 2016: Port Darwin
Party	Candidate	Votes	%	±%
Labor	Paul Kirby	1,496	38.4	+5.4
Country Liberal	Rohan Kelly	1,412	36.3	−19.3
Independent	Matthew Baker	498	12.8	+12.8
Independent	Carol Phayer	313	8.0	+8.0
1 Territory	David Cameron	123	3.2	+3.2
Independent	Kenneth Wu	52	1.3	+1.3
Total formal votes		3,894	97.9	+0.5
Informal votes		82	2.1	−0.5
Turnout		3,976	75.3	+2.8
Two-party-preferred result
Labor	Paul Kirby	1,875	52.8	+12.5
Country Liberal	Rohan Kelly	1,676	47.2	−12.5
Labor gain from Country Liberal		Swing	+12.5	

=== Sanderson ===
Northern Territory general election, 2016: Sanderson
Party	Candidate	Votes	%	±%
Labor	Kate Worden	2,323	52.3	+9.3
Country Liberal	Peter Styles	1,573	35.4	−15.5
Independent	Andrew Arthur	331	7.4	+7.4
1 Territory	Trudi Andersson	135	3.0	+3.0
Independent	Thomas Lynch	81	1.8	+1.8
Total formal votes		4,443	98.6	+1.5
Informal votes		63	1.4	−1.5
Turnout		4,506	81.2	−1.3
Two-party-preferred result
Labor	Kate Worden	2,578	60.5	+13.6
Country Liberal	Peter Styles	1,680	39.5	−13.6
Labor gain from Country Liberal		Swing	+13.6	

=== Spillett ===
Northern Territory general election, 2016: Spillett
Party	Candidate	Votes	%	±%
Country Liberal	Lia Finocchiaro	2,277	56.1	−5.6
Labor	Phil Tilbrook	1,247	30.7	+4.0
1 Territory	Jeff Norton	237	5.8	+5.8
Independent	Richard Smith	175	4.3	+4.3
Independent	Sonia McKay	95	2.3	+2.3
Citizens Electoral Council	Trudy Campbell	29	0.7	+0.7
Total formal votes		4,060	98.2	+1.4
Informal votes		76	1.8	−1.4
Turnout		4,136	78.3	+7.2
Two-party-preferred result
Country Liberal	Lia Finocchiaro	2,438	63.1	−4.9
Labor	Phil Tilbrook	1,428	36.9	+4.9
Country Liberal hold		Swing	−4.9	

=== Stuart ===
Northern Territory general election, 2016: Stuart
Party	Candidate	Votes	%	±%
Labor	Scott McConnell	1,937	67.4	+32.2
Country Liberal	Bess Price	590	20.5	−26.2
Independent	Maurie Ryan	228	7.9	+7.9
1 Territory	Andi Bracey	119	4.1	+4.1
Total formal votes		2,874	98.9	+4.3
Informal votes		32	1.1	−4.3
Turnout		2,906	55.4	−9.8
Two-party-preferred result
Labor	Scott McConnell	2,114	75.4	+30.9
Country Liberal	Bess Price	690	24.6	−30.9
Labor gain from Country Liberal		Swing	+30.9	

=== Wanguri ===
Northern Territory general election, 2016: Wanguri
Party	Candidate	Votes	%	±%
Labor	Nicole Manison	2,673	58.6	+1.7
Country Liberal	Steven Doherty	1,079	23.6	−19.5
Independent	Shauna Mounsey	684	15.0	+15.0
Independent	Jan Pile	129	2.8	+2.8
Total formal votes		4,565	98.3	+0.3
Informal votes		81	1.7	−0.3
Turnout		4,646	83.4	+6.9
Two-party-preferred result
Labor	Nicole Manison	3,026	69.9	+13.1
Country Liberal	Steven Doherty	1,302	30.1	−13.1
Labor hold		Swing	+13.1	
