= Padgham =

Padgham is a surname. Notable people with the surname include:

- Alf Padgham (1906–1966), English golfer
- Hugh Padgham (born 1955), English record producer and audio engineer
- Noel Padgham-Purich (born 1927), Australian politician
