= 1974 Northern Territory general election =

- 19 October 1974

All 19 seats of the Northern Territory Legislative Assembly 10 seats needed for a majority
- Turnout: 75.4
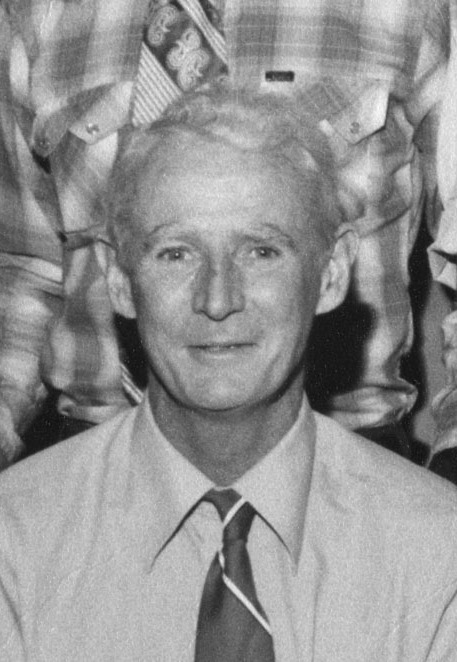

	First party	Second party
Leader	Goff Letts	Richard Ward
Party	Country Liberal	Labor
Leader's seat	Victoria River (won seat)	Did not contest
Seats won	17	0
Popular vote	13,690	8,508
Percentage	49.0%	30.5%
Swing		N/A
Elected Majority Leader
Goff Letts
Country Liberal

The first general election for the Northern Territory Legislative Assembly was held in the Northern Territory on Saturday 19 October 1974.

The Country Liberal Party (CLP), formed a few months earlier from the merger of the territorial Country and Liberal parties, won a landslide victory with 49.01% of the vote. The Labor Party won 30.46% and independent candidates won 20.54%. The Country Liberals took 17 of the 19 assembly seats. The other two were held by independents; Dawn Lawrie won the seat of Nightcliff, and Ron Withnall won the seat of Port Darwin. Despite finishing second in the vote count, Labor failed to win any seats. Its support was spread out across the Territory, and was not concentrated in enough areas to translate into seats.

As the territory was still being prepared for self-government, Country Liberal leader Goff Letts took the post of Majority Leader–equivalent to a state premier. Instead of a cabinet, a seven-person "executive" managed internal affairs.

This would be the first of the CLP's eight consecutive election victories. The party would govern the territory for 28 years, one of the longest unbroken runs in government in Australia.

== Results ==
Summary of the results of the 1974 Northern Territory general election, Legislative Assembly
Party	Votes	%	Seats
Country Liberal	13,690	49.01	17
Labor	8,508	30.46	0
Independents	5,737	20.54	2
Total	27,935	100.00	19
Valid votes	27,935	94.93	
Invalid/blank votes	1,493	5.07	
Total votes	29,428	100.00	
Registered voters/turnout	39,027	75.40	

Popular vote
Country Liberal	49.0%
Labor	30.5%
Independents	20.5%

Seats
Country Liberal	89.5%
Independents	10.5%

== Candidates ==
Successful candidates are highlighted in the relevant colour. Where there is possible confusion, an asterisk is used.

Electorate	Labor	CLP	Independent
Alice Springs	Jean Leunig	Bernie Kilgariff	Alan Gray
Arnhem	Elizabeth Pearce	Rupert Kentish	
Barkly	Eric Marks	Ian Tuxworth	
Casuarina	Allan Dunstan	Nick Dondas	Robert McGahey; Dudley Orr
Elsey	Kevin Frazer	Les MacFarlane	Leslie James; James Martin
Fannie Bay	James Bowditch	Grant Tambling	Eleanor Fisher; John McCormack
Gillen	Peter Leunig	Jim Robertson	
Jingili	Thomas Bell	Paul Everingham	
Ludmilla	Hazel Robertson	Roger Steele	Edward D'Ambrosio; Brian Smith; Grahame Stewart; William Sullivan
Macdonnell		Dave Pollock	Bruce Breaden; Malcolm Wolf
Millner	Jack Hunt	Roger Ryan	William Forrest; John Quinn
Nhulunbuy	John Flynn	Milton Ballantyne	William Hendry
Nightcliff	Edward Ellis	Alfred Hooper	Dawn Lawrie
Port Darwin	James Gallacher	William Jettner	Brian Manning; Ron Withnall*
Sanderson	Mark Phelan	Liz Andrew	Alexander Allan-Stewart; Herbert Sinclair
Stuart	Harry Nelson	Roger Vale	Reginald Harris
Stuart Park	Geoffrey Loveday	Marshall Perron	William Fisher; John McNamee
Tiwi	John Nixon	Hyacinth Tungutalum	Peter Lawrence; Robert Oaten; Noel Padgham-Purich; Lou Stewart
Victoria River		Goff Letts	Wiyendji Nunggula; Charles Renfrey

== See also ==
- First Letts Executive
- Second Letts Executive
- Third Letts Executive
- Fourth Letts Executive
