= 1976 Alice Springs by-election =

7 February 1976
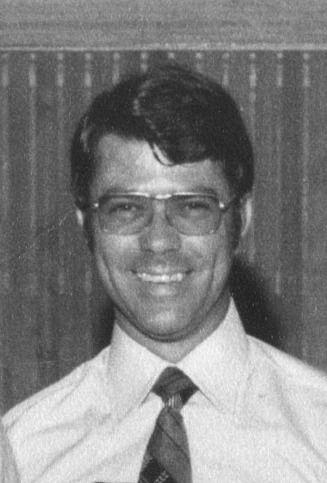
	First party	Second party	Third party
		ALP	IND
Candidate	Eric Manuell	John Piper	Alan Gray
Party	Country Liberal	Labor	Independent
First preference vote	874	602	168
Percentage	53.2%	36.6%	10.2%
Swing	▼19.0	▲16.0	▲3.0
MP before election
Bernie Kilgariff
Country Liberal
Elected MP
Eric Manuell
Country Liberal

A by-election for the seat of Alice Springs in the Northern Territory Legislative Assembly was held on 7 February 1976. The by-election was triggered by the resignation of Country Liberal Party (CLP) member Bernie Kilgariff, the Deputy Majority Leader, to run for one of two newly created seats in the Australian Senate for the Northern Territory in the 1975 federal election.

== Results ==
1976 Alice Springs by-election
Party	Candidate	Votes	%	±%
Country Liberal	Eric Manuell	874	53.2	−19.0
Labor	John Piper	602	36.6	+16.0
Independent	Alan Gray	168	10.2	+3.0
Total formal votes		1,644	97.2	+2.7
Informal votes		48	2.8	−2.7
Turnout		1,692	66.2	−9.5
Country Liberal hold		Swing		

- Preferences were not distributed.
