= List of transgender politicians in Australia =

This is a list of openly transgender politicians in Australia.

== Local government ==
Image	Officeholder	Party	LGA	Term	Notes
	Tony Briffa (1970–)	Independent	Hobsons Bay (Vic)	29 November 2008 – 14 February 2014	World's first known intersex and non-binary mayor and public officeholder. Resigned in 2014 but successfully recontested in 2016. Retired
	Tony Briffa (1970–)	Independent	Hobsons Bay (Vic)	22 October 2016 – 26 October 2024	World's first known intersex and non-binary mayor and public officeholder. Resigned in 2014 but successfully recontested in 2016. Retired
	Crystal Love Johnson	Independent	Tiwi Islands (NT)		Sistergirl
	Emily Wilding	Independent	Bassendean (WA)	16 October 2021 – 18 October 2025	Trans woman. retired
	Jade Darko	Greens	Clarence (Tas)	25 October 2022 – present	Trans woman. Incumbent
	Tosh-Jake Finnigan	Sack Dan Andrews	Colac Otway (Vic)	18 January 2023 – 22 December 2023	Trans and non-binary. Lost seat
	Tosh-Jake Finnigan	Independent	Colac Otway (Vic)	22 December 2023 – 26 October 2024	Trans and non-binary. Lost seat
	Paige Johnson	Labor	Newcastle (NSW)	14 September 2024 – present	Trans woman. Incumbent
	Olly Arkins	Labor	Sydney (NSW)	14 September 2024 – present	Trans woman. Incumbent

== Other ==
Ann (formerly Albert) Knowles, the mayor of the City of Frankston in the 1980s, came out as a transgender woman in later life.

== Non-binary politicians ==
=== State/territory ===
Image	Member	Party	Electorate	Term	Notes
	Kat McNamara	Greens	Nightcliff (NT)	26 August 2024 – 9 February 2026	Non-binary. Resigned

=== Local government ===
Image	Officeholder	Party	LGA	Term	Notes
	Jax Fox	Independent	Hobart (Tas)	30 October 2018 – 25 October 2022	Non-binary. Lost seat
	Liz Atkins	Greens	Inner West (NSW)	4 December 2021 – present	Non-binary. Incumbent
	Tosh-Jake Finnigan	Sack Dan Andrews	Colac Otway (Vic)	18 January 2023 – 22 December 2023	Non-binary. Lost seat
	Tosh-Jake Finnigan	Independent	Colac Otway (Vic)	22 December 2023 – 26 October 2024	Non-binary. Lost seat

== See also ==
- List of LGBTI holders of political offices in Australia
