= Eric Manuell =

Australian politician

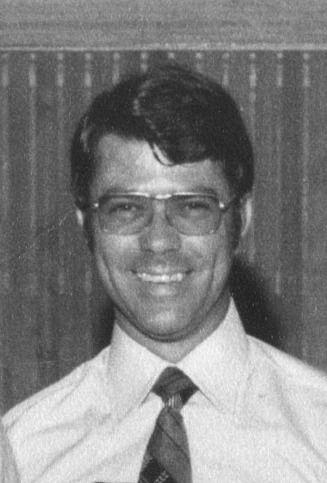
Manuell in 1976

Northern Territory Legislative Assembly
Years	Term	Electoral division	Party
1976–1977	1st	Alice Springs	Country Liberal

George Eric Manuell (born 28 April 1941) is a former Australian politician. He was the Country Liberal Party member for Alice Springs in the Northern Territory Legislative Assembly from 1976 to 1977.

Northern Territory Legislative Assembly
Preceded by Bernie Kilgariff	Member for Alice Springs; 1976–1977	Succeeded by Rod Oliver
