= Hyacinth Tungutalum =

Australian politician (1946–2009)

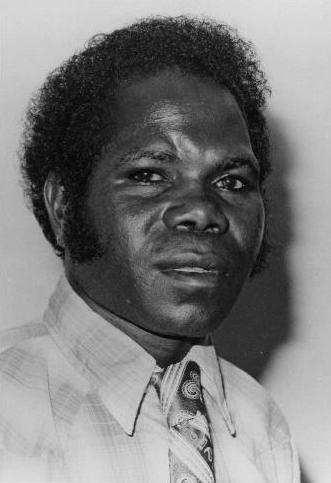
- Tungutalum in 1974

Member of the Northern Territory Legislative Assembly for Tiwi
- In office 19 October 1974 – 12 August 1977
- Preceded by: Division created
- Succeeded by: Noel Padgham-Purich

Personal details
- Born: Hyacinth Gabriel Tungutalum; 14 August 1946 Bathurst Island, Northern Territory, Australia
- Died: 7 April 2009 (aged 62)
- Party: County Liberal

Hyacinth Gabriel Tungutalum (14 August 1946 – 7 April 2009) was an Australian politician and the first Indigenous Australian to be elected to the Northern Territory parliament.

Northern Territory Legislative Assembly
Years	Term	Electoral division	Party
1974–1977	1st	Tiwi	Country Liberal

A traditional owner on the Tiwi Islands, north of Darwin, Tungutalum was elected as the Country Liberal Party (CLP) member for the Northern Territory Legislative Assembly's Electoral division of Tiwi at the 1974 Northern Territory election, serving until his retirement at the 1977 election.

Tungutalum was heavily involved in Australian rules football in the Tiwi Islands and served as President of the Tiwi Islands Football League for many years, winning the ATSIC National Administrator of the Year Award in 1995 for his services.

Tungutalum died in 2009 of a heart attack.

== Sources ==
- Lee, D. & Barfoot, M. (1996) NTFL, Northern Territory Football League: Darwin. ISBN 0646 26754X.

Northern Territory Legislative Assembly
New seat	Member for Tiwi; 1974–1977	Succeeded by Noel Padgham-Purich
