= Les MacFarlane =

Australian politician

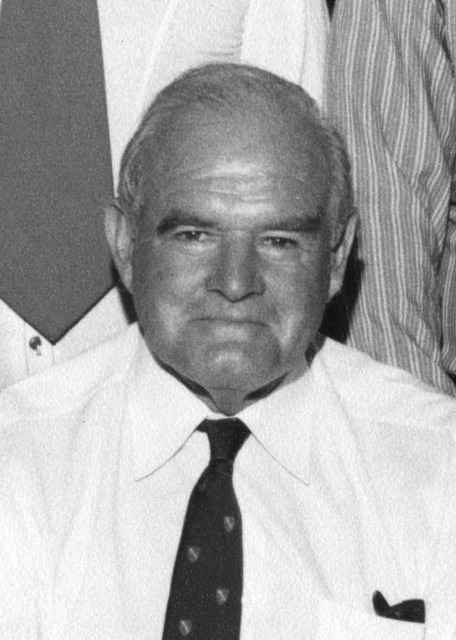
MacFarlane in 1976

Northern Territory Legislative Assembly
Years	Term	Electoral division	Party
1974–1977	1st	Elsey	Country Liberal
1977–1980	2nd	Elsey	Country Liberal
1980–1983	3rd	Elsey	Country Liberal

John Leslie Stuart MacFarlane (26 March 1919 – 15 January 1986) was an Australian politician. He was the Country Liberal Party member for Elsey in the Northern Territory Legislative Assembly from 1974 to 1983. He was Speaker from 1975 to 1984.

Before his election to parliament, MacFarlane was chair of the "Rights for Whites Committee", which opposed land rights for Aboriginal Australians.

Northern Territory Legislative Assembly
New seat	Member for Elsey; 1974–1983	Succeeded by Roger Steele
Preceded by Bernie Kilgariff	Speaker of the Northern Territory Legislative Assembly; 1975–1984	Succeeded by Roger Steele
