= 1980 Northern Territory general election =

← 1977	7 June 1980	1983 →

All 19 seats of the Northern Territory Legislative Assembly 10 seats needed for a majority
- Turnout: 78.0 (▲2.1 pp)
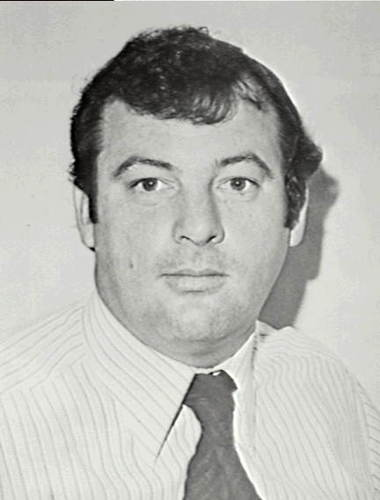

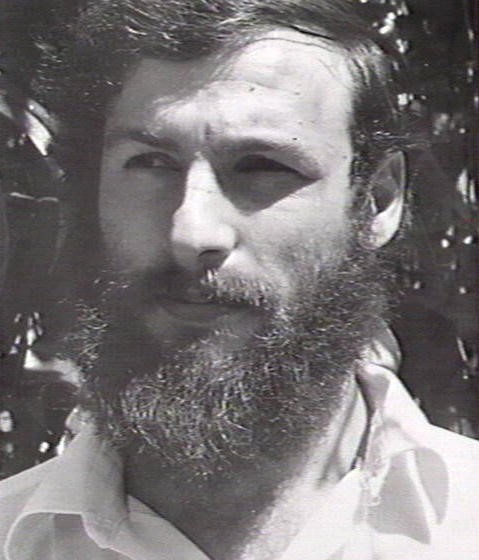
	First party	Second party
Leader	Paul Everingham	Jon Isaacs
Party	Country Liberal	Labor
Leader since	13 August 1977	21 September 1977
Leader's seat	Jingili	Millner
Last election	12 seats	6 seats
Seats won	11	7
Seat change	▼1	▲1
Popular vote	20,065	15,818
Percentage	50.0%	39.4%
Swing	▲9.9	▲1.2
Chief Minister before election
Paul Everingham
Country Liberal
Elected Chief Minister
Paul Everingham
Country Liberal

A general election was held in the Northern Territory on Saturday June 7, 1980. It was the first to be held since self-government was attained two years earlier, and was won by the incumbent Country Liberal Party (CLP) under Chief Minister Paul Everingham.

Although the CLP's share of the vote increased by almost 10 percentage points, it lost one seat.

The only independent member of the Legislative Assembly, Dawn Lawrie, retained her seat of Nightcliff.

== Results ==
Summary of the results of the 1980 Northern Territory general election. Legislative Assembly
Party	Votes	%	+/–	Seats	+/–
Country Liberal	20,065	49.97	▲9.84	11	▼1
Labor	15,818	39.39	▲1.16	7	▲1
Independents	3,251	8.10	▼3.54	1	Steady
Democrats	352	0.88	▲0.88	0	Steady
Marijuana	272	0.68	▲0.68	0	Steady
Progress	210	0.52	▼9.24	0	Steady
Christian Democrat	188	0.47	New	0	Steady
Total	40,156	100.00	–	19	–
Valid votes	40,156	96.80			
Invalid/blank votes	1,328	3.20	▼0.53		
Total votes	41,484	100.00	–		
Registered voters/turnout	53,218	77.95	▲18.14		

Popular vote
Country Liberal	50.0%
Labor	39.4%
Democrats	0.9%
Marijuana	0.7%
Progress	0.5%
Others	0.5%
Independents	8.1%

Seats
Country Liberal	57.9%
Labor	36.8%
Independents	5.3%

== Candidates ==
Sitting members are listed in bold. Successful candidates are highlighted in the relevant colour.

Electorate	Held by	Labor	CLP	Other
Alice Springs	CLP	Ted Hampton	Denis Collins	**Rod Oliver** (Ind); Dave Pollock (Ind)
Arnhem	Labor	**Bob Collins**	Gatjil Djerrkura	Mark McAleer (AMP)
Barkly	CLP	William Thomson	**Ian Tuxworth**	Neville Andrews (PP)
Casuarina	CLP	Dennis Bree	**Nick Dondas**	Klaus Roth (Dem)
Elsey	CLP	Maged Aboutaleb	**Les MacFarlane**	Patricia Davies (Ind); James Forscutt (Ind); Lawrence Hughes (Ind); R. T. Reilly (Ind)
Fannie Bay	Labor	**Pam O'Neil**	Ella Stack	
Gillen	CLP	Rosalie McDonald	**Jim Robertson**	
Jingili	CLP	Peter Hansen	**Paul Everingham**	Peter Read (Dem)
Ludmilla	CLP	Kay Spurr	**Roger Steele**	Roy Barden (Ind)
Macdonnell	Labor	**Neville Perkins**	Rosalie Kunoth-Monks	
Millner	Labor	**Jon Isaacs**	John Robinson	
Nhulunbuy	CLP	Dan Leo	**Milton Ballantyne**	Michael O'Reilly (Ind)
Nightcliff	Independent		Anne Amos	Charles Coombs (CDP); **Dawn Lawrie** (Ind)
Port Darwin	CLP	Jack Haritos	**Tom Harris**	Len Myles (Dem); Peter Taylor (AMP)
Sanderson	Labor	**June D'Rozario**	Daryl Manzie	Ron Mann (CDP)
Stuart	CLP	John Thomas	**Roger Vale**	
Stuart Park	CLP	Peter Cavanagh	**Marshall Perron**	John Duffy (AMP); Terry Wilson (Ind)
Tiwi	CLP	Harry Maschke	**Noel Padgham-Purich**	Len McAlear (Ind); Jenny Smither (AMP)
Victoria River	Labor	**Jack Doolan**	John Millhouse	Bronte Douglass (Ind); Jack McCarthy (Ind)

== Seats changing hands ==
Seat	Pre-1980			Swing	Post-1980		
Seat	Party	Member	Margin	Swing	Margin	Member	Party
Nhulunbuy	Country Liberals	Milton Ballantyne	6.1	N/A	4.4	Dan Leo	Labor
