= 2026 Nightcliff by-election =

- 7 March 2026

Electoral division of Nightcliff in the Northern Territory Legislative Assembly
- Registered: 5,940
- Turnout: 3,913 (65.9% ▼10.8)

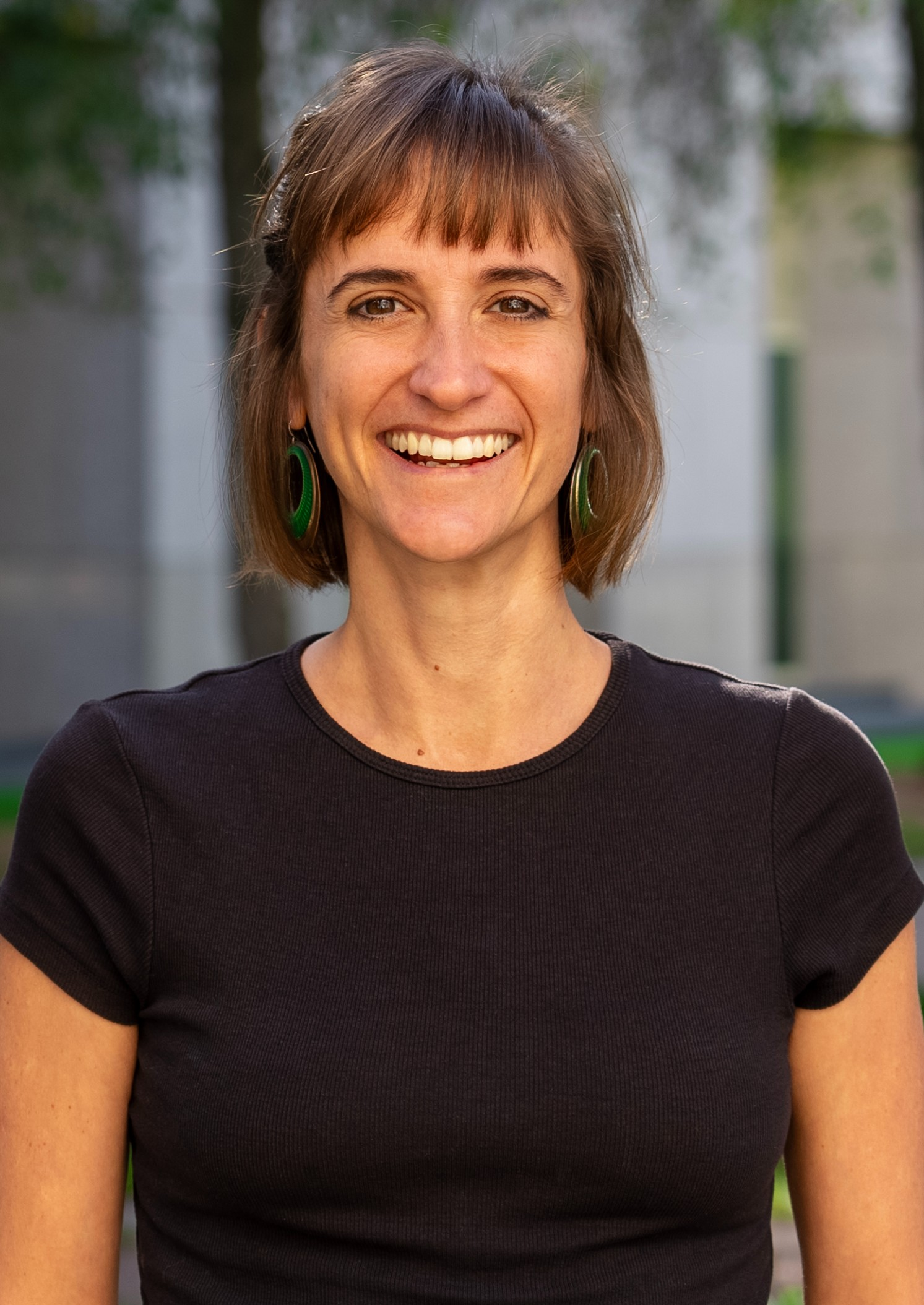

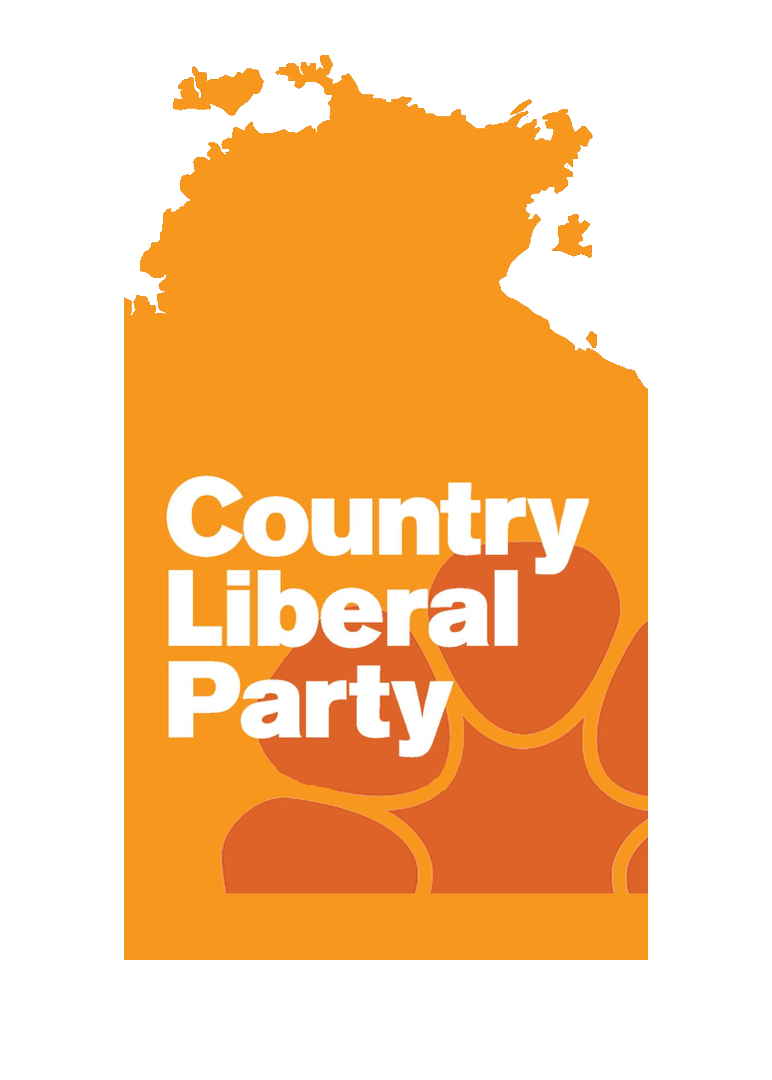
	First party	Second party
Candidate	Ed Smelt	Suki Dorras-Walker
Party	Labor	Greens
Primary vote	1,095	1,298
Percentage	28.6%	33.9%
Swing	▼4.2%	▲12.0%
TCP	1,973	1,853
TCP %	51.6%	48.4%
TCP swing	▲2.0%	▼2.0%
	Third party	Fourth party
		IND
Candidate	Anjan Paudel	Phil Scott
Party	Country Liberal	Independent
Primary vote	765	668
Percentage	20.0%	17.5%
Swing	▼3.7%	▲17.5%
MLA before election
Kat McNamara
Greens
Elected MLA
Ed Smelt
NT Labor

A by-election for the electoral division of Nightcliff in the Northern Territory Legislative Assembly was held on 7 March 2026, following the resignation of Greens MLA Kat McNamara. The by-election was won by Ed Smelt for the Labor Party. The election was a setback for the Greens as they lost the only seat they held in the assembly.

== Background ==
McNamara resigned from the NT Legislative Assembly on 9 February 2026 citing "ongoing health challenges". They (Note: Kat McNamara identifies as non-binary and uses they/them and she/her pronouns.) were the first Greens MLA in the NT, winning election in 2024 by just 36 votes.

=== 2024 results ===
2024 Northern Territory general election: Nightcliff
Party	Candidate	Votes	%	±%
Labor	Natasha Fyles	1,467	32.8	−20.0
Country Liberal	Helen Secretary	1,060	23.7	+5.0
Greens	Kat McNamara	981	22.0	+3.2
Independent	Mililma May	858	19.2	+19.2
Independent	George Mamouzellos	102	2.3	+2.3
Total formal votes		4,468	97.2	
Informal votes		127	2.8	
Turnout		4,595	81.3	
Estimated two-party-preferred result (Note: By Antony Green.)
Labor	Natasha Fyles	2,908	65.1	−9.0
Country Liberal	Helen Secretary	1,559	34.9	+9.0
Two-candidate-preferred result (Note: Kat McNamara overtook Helen Secretary in the distribution of preferences to advanced to the runoff.)
Greens	Kat McNamara	2,252	50.4	+50.4
Labor	Natasha Fyles	2,216	49.6	−24.5
Greens gain from Labor				

== Key dates ==
- Issue of writ — 12 February 2026
- Nominations open — 12 February 2026
- Electoral roll closes — 13 February 2026; 5 pm
- Nominations close — 19 February 2026; 12 pm
- Declaration of nominations and ballot draw — 13 February 2026; 1 pm
- Postal vote mail-out commences — 23 February 2026
- Early voting begins — 23 February 2026
- Mobile voting begins — 23 February 2026
- Overseas postal voting despatch closes — 3 March 2026; 5 pm
- All postal voting despatch closes — 5 March 2026; 5 pm
- Early voting closes — 6 March 2026; 6 pm
- Election day — 7 March 2026
- Election day voting closes — 7 March 2026; 6 pm
- Mobile voting closes — 7 March 2026; 5 pm
- Count begins — 7 March 2026; 5 pm
- Recheck of counts — 9 March 2026; 9 am
- Verification of declaration votes — 9 March 2026; 9 am
- Postal votes count begins — 9 March 2026; 9 am
- Postal vote deadline — 20 March 2026; 12 pm
- Final distribution of preferences — 20 March 2026; 12 pm
- Results declared — 23 March 2026; 10 am
- Return of writ — 13 April 2026
- Last day to dispute validity of election — 4 May 2026

== Candidates ==
On 11 February 2026, the Greens announced Suki Dorras-Walker as their candidate for the by-election. She had formerly contested the seat of Fannie Bay at the 2024 election and is a former teacher. The following day, the Labor Party announced Darwin councillor Ed Smelt as their candidate.

The Country Liberal Party confirmed Anjan Paudel as their candidate. Phil Scott, who was associated with the Voices of the Top End group and who stood for the Division of Solomon at the 2025 federal election, stated that he would run as an independent candidate.

== Results ==
2026 Nightcliff by-election
Party	Candidate	Votes	%	±%
Greens	Suki Dorras-Walker	1,298	33.9	+12.0
Labor	Ed Smelt	1,095	28.6	−4.2
Country Liberal	Anjan Paudel	765	20.0	−3.7
Independent	Phil Scott	668	17.5	+17.5
Total formal votes		3,826	97.8	+0.5
Informal votes		87	2.2	−0.5
Turnout		3,913	65.9	−10.8
Two-candidate-preferred result
Labor	Ed Smelt	1,973	51.6	+2.0
Greens	Suki Dorras-Walker	1,853	48.4	−2.0
Labor gain from Greens		Swing	+2.0	

=== Results by polling place ===
==== First preference results by polling place ====
Polling place	Greens		ALP		CLP		Phil Scott		Formal		Informal		Turnout	
Polling place	Votes	%	Votes	%	Votes	%	Votes	%	Votes	%	Votes	%	Total	%
Nightcliff pre-poll	812	31.8	749	29.3	547	21.4	448	17.5	2,556	97.4	68	2.6	2,624	67.1
Nightcliff	334	37.4	248	27.8	167	18.7	143	16.0	892	98.3	15	1.7	907	23.2
Urban Voting Darwin	9	28.1	10	31.3	4	12.5	9	28.1	32	100.0	0	0.0	32	0.8
Postal	143	41.3	88	25.4	47	13.6	68	19.7	346	98.9	4	1.1	350	8.9

==== Two candidate preferred results by polling place ====
Polling place	Greens		Labor		Formal	
Polling place	Votes	%	Votes	%	Total	%
Nightcliff pre-poll	1,192	46.6	1,364	53.4	2,556	97.5
Nightcliff	451	50.6	441	49.4	892	98.3
Urban Voting Darwin	12	37.5	20	62.5	32	100.0
Postal	198	57.2	148	42.8	346	98.9
