= Electoral division of Tiwi =

Former electoral division of the Northern Territory

Tiwi was an electoral division of the Legislative Assembly in Australia's Northern Territory. One of the Legislative Assembly's original electorates, it was first contested at the 1974 election, and existed until 1983. It was named after the Tiwi Islands.

== Members for Tiwi ==
Member	Party	Term
Hyacinth Tungutalum	Country Liberal	1974–1977
Noel Padgham-Purich	Country Liberal	1977–1983

== Election results ==
=== Elections in the 1970s ===
1974 Northern Territory general election: Tiwi
Party	Candidate	Votes	%	±%
Country Liberal	Hyacinth Tungutalum	454	45.4	
Independent	Peter Lawrence; Robert Oaten; Noel Padgham-Purich; Lou Stewart	391	39.1	
Labor	John Nixon	156	15.6	
Total formal votes		1,001	94.3	
Informal votes		61	5.7	
Turnout		1,062	67.6	
Country Liberal win		(new seat)		

- Preferences were not distributed.
- The number of votes each individual Independent received is unknown.

1977 Northern Territory general election: Tiwi
Party	Candidate	Votes	%	±%
Labor	Harry Maschke; Bernard Tipiloura	495	42.5	
Country Liberal	Noel Padgham-Purich; Cyril Rioli	393	33.7	
Independent	Terrence O'Brien; Strider	143	12.3	
Progress	George Ryan	134	11.5	
Total formal votes		1,165	89.1	
Informal votes		142	10.9	
Turnout		1,307	77.5	
Two-party-preferred result
Country Liberal	Noel Padgham-Purich	612	52.5	
Labor		553	47.5	
Country Liberal hold		Swing		

- The number of votes each individual Independent, Labor and CLP candidate received is unknown.
- The Labor candidate that came second on preferences is unknown.

=== Elections in the 1980s ===
1980 Northern Territory general election: Tiwi
Party	Candidate	Votes	%	±%
Country Liberal	Noel Padgham-Purich	973	51.5	+17.8
Labor	Harry Maschke	813	43.1	+0.6
Marijuana	Jenny Smither	72	3.8	+3.8
Independent	Len McAlear	30	1.6	+1.6
Total formal votes		1,888	93.7	
Informal votes		127	6.3	
Turnout		2,015	82.5	
Country Liberal hold		Swing	N/A	

- Preferences were not distributed.
