= Yiwarr McGrath =

Australian politician

Yiwarr McGrath MLA

Member of the Northern Territory Legislative Assembly for Mulka
- Incumbent
- Assumed office 12 September 2026
- Preceded by: Yingiya Mark Guyula

Personal details
- Born: Stuart Yiwarr McGrath
- Party: Labor
- Children: 2
- Education: Charles Darwin University
- Occupation: Registered Nurse

Stuart Yiwarr McGrath is an Australian politician and a Yolŋu man. He is a member of the Northern Territory Legislative Assembly, having won the seat of Mulka at the 2026 by-election.

== Biography ==
McGrath spent his early years in the coastal Yolŋu homeland of Mata Mata, on the Arafura Sea opposite Inglis Island, where his mother and grandmother taught at the local school. His father died while he was 5 and his mother passed away in her 40s, leaving McGrath orphaned and living on Elcho Island in East Arnhem Land with a number of relatives, before moving to Canberra and later boarding school in Darwin. Upon returning to East Arnhem land, he saw the health disparity in his community, which inspired him to become an Aboriginal Health Officer, and later the first Yolŋu Registered Nurse.

In 2021, McGrath was named NT Young Australian of the year, for his achievements in helping to Close the Gap, improve cultural safety in healthcare, and research into Indigenous health.

Northern Territory Legislative Assembly
Years	Term	Electoral division	Party
2026–present	15th	Mulka	Labor

In 2026, McGrath was announced as the Labor Party candidate for the 2026 Mulka by-election, where he won against Independent candidate Andrew Blamey.

Northern Territory Legislative Assembly
Preceded by Yingiya Mark Guyula	Member for Mulka; 2026–present	Incumbent
