= Electoral division of Alice Springs =

Alice Springs Northern Territory—Legislative Assembly
- Territory: Northern Territory
- Created: 1947 (Legislative Council); 1974 (Legislative Assembly)
- Namesake: Alice Springs

Alice Springs was an electoral division of the Legislative Assembly in Australia's Northern Territory. Originally created for the Legislative Council in 1947, the seat had 735 electors and elected a single member. It became one of the Legislative Assembly's original electorates and was contested at the 1974 election, and was named after the town of Alice Springs. It was abolished in 1983 and replaced by the new seats of Araluen, Braitling and Sadadeen.

== Members for Alice Springs ==
=== Legislative Council ===
Member	Party	Term
Lionel Rose	Independent	1962–1965
Lionel Rose	North Australia	1965
Charles Orr	Labor	1965–1971

=== Legislative Assembly ===
Member	Party	Term
Bernie Kilgariff	Country Liberal	1974–1975
Eric Manuell	Country Liberal	1976–1977
Rod Oliver	Country Liberal	1977–1979
Rod Oliver	Independent	1979–1980
Denis Collins	Country Liberal	1980–1983

== Election results ==
=== Elections in the 1970s ===
1974 Northern Territory general election: Alice Springs
Party	Candidate	Votes	%	±%
Country Liberal	Bernie Kilgariff	1,319	72.2	N/A
Labor	Jean Leunig	377	20.6	N/A
Independent	Alan Gray	131	7.2	N/A
Total formal votes		1,827	94.5	N/A
Informal votes		106	5.5	N/A
Turnout		1,933	75.7	N/A
Country Liberal win		(new seat)		

- Preferences were not distributed.

1976 Alice Springs by-election
Party	Candidate	Votes	%	±%
Country Liberal	Eric Manuell	874	53.2	−19.0
Labor	Piper	602	36.6	+16.0
Independent	Alan Gray	168	10.2	+3.0
Total formal votes		1,644	97.2	+2.7
Informal votes		48	2.8	−2.7
Turnout		1,692	66.2	−9.5
Country Liberal hold		Swing		

- Preferences were not distributed.

1977 Northern Territory general election: Alice Springs
Party	Candidate	Votes	%	±%
Country Liberal	Rod Oliver	929	51.1	N/A
Labor	Rosalie McDonald	644	35.4	N/A
Progress	Brian Evans	245	13.5	N/A
Total formal votes		1,818	96.9	N/A
Informal votes		59	3.1	N/A
Turnout		1,877	73.0	N/A
Country Liberal hold		Swing		

- Preferences were not distributed.

=== Elections in the 1980s ===
1980 Northern Territory general election: Alice Springs
Party	Candidate	Votes	%	±%
Country Liberal	Denis Collins	999	43.8	−7.3
Independent	Rod Oliver	620	27.1	+27.1
Labor	Ted Hampton	505	22.1	−13.3
Independent	Dave Pollock	158	7.1	+7.1
Total formal votes		2,282	97.4	N/A
Informal votes		60	2.6	N/A
Turnout		2,342	78.0	N/A
Two-candidate-preferred result
Country Liberal	Denis Collins	1,170	51.3	N/A
Independent	Rod Oliver	1,112	48.7	N/A
Country Liberal hold		Swing	N/A	
