= Electoral division of Elsey =

Former electoral division of the Northern Territory

Elsey was an electoral division of the Northern Territory Legislative Assembly in Australia. One of the original divisions, it was first contested in 1974 and was abolished in 1987. It was named after Elsey National Park. It was largely replaced by the new and considerably smaller electorate of Katherine, as population growth in the town of Katherine had resulted in the removal of much of the rural area of the electorate in the 1986 electoral redistribution.

== Members for Elsey ==
| Member | Party | Term |
|---|---|---|
| Les MacFarlane | Country Liberal | 1974–1983 |
| Roger Steele | Country Liberal | 1983–1987 |

== Election results ==
=== Elections in the 1970s ===
1974 Northern Territory general election: Elsey
| Party | Candidate | Votes | % | ±% |
|---|---|---|---|---|
| Country Liberal | Les MacFarlane | 800 | 63.5 | |
| Labor | Kevin Frazer | 362 | 28.8 | |
| Independent | Leslie James; James Martin | 97 | 7.7 | |
| Total formal votes | | 1,259 | 95.5 | |
| Informal votes | | 60 | 4.5 | |
| Turnout | | 1,319 | 70.0 | |
| Country Liberal win | | (new seat) | | |

- Preferences were not distributed.
- The number of votes each individual Independent received is unknown.

1977 Northern Territory general election: Elsey
| Party | Candidate | Votes | % | ±% |
|---|---|---|---|---|
| Country Liberal | Les MacFarlane | 617 | 44.2 | |
| Independent | Davis Daniels; Patricia Davies | 696 | 49.8 | |
| Progress | Deidre Killen | 84 | 6.0 | |
| Total formal votes | | 1,397 | 98.2 | |
| Informal votes | | 26 | 1.8 | |
| Turnout | | 1,423 | 69.0 | |
Two-candidate-preferred result
| Country Liberal | Les MacFarlane | 726 | 52.0 | |
| Independent | | 671 | 48.0 | |
| Country Liberal hold | | Swing | | |

- The number of votes each individual Independent received is unknown.
- The independent candidate that came second on preferences is unknown.

=== Elections in the 1980s ===
1980 Northern Territory general election: Elsey
| Party | Candidate | Votes | % | ±% |
|---|---|---|---|---|
| Country Liberal | Les MacFarlane | 879 | 45.0 | +0.8 |
| Labor | Maged Aboutaleb | 580 | 29.7 | +29.7 |
| Independent | James Forscutt | 188 | 9.6 | +9.6 |
| Independent | Patricia Davies | 174 | 8.9 | |
| Independent | Laurence Hughes | 93 | 4.8 | +4.8 |
| Independent | R.T. Reilly | 38 | 1.9 | +1.9 |
| Total formal votes | | 1,952 | 96.4 | |
| Informal votes | | 73 | 3.6 | |
| Turnout | | 2,025 | 74.6 | |
After distribution of preferences
| Country Liberal | Les MacFarlane | 1,014 | 51.9 | |
| Labor | Maged Aboutaleb | 655 | 33.6 | |
| Independent | James Forscutt | 283 | 14.5 | |
| Country Liberal hold | | Swing | N/A | |

- Preferences were not distributed to completion.

1983 Northern Territory general election: Elsey
| Party | Candidate | Votes | % | ±% |
|---|---|---|---|---|
| Country Liberal | Roger Steele | 978 | 49.7 | |
| Labor | Trevor Surplice | 540 | 27.5 | |
| Independent | James Forscutt | 448 | 22.8 | |
| Total formal votes | | 1,966 | 97.7 | |
| Informal votes | | 47 | 2.3 | |
| Turnout | | 2,013 | 81.5 | |
Two-party-preferred result
| Country Liberal | Roger Steele | 1,294 | 65.8 | |
| Labor | Trevor Surplice | 672 | 34.2 | |
| Country Liberal hold | | Swing | | |
