= Ed Smelt =

Australian politician

Ed Smelt MLA

Member of the Northern Territory Legislative Assembly for Nightcliff
- Incumbent
- Assumed office 7 March 2026
- Preceded by: Kat McNamara

Personal details
- Born: Edward Smelt
- Party: Labor
- Spouse: Susannah Ritchie
- Children: 4
- Education: University of Melbourne
- Occupation: Civil engineer

Edward Smelt is an Australian politician. He is a member of the Northern Territory Legislative Assembly, having won the seat of Nightcliff at the 2026 by-election.

== Biography ==
Smelt spent his early years living in Bendigo, where he attended Girton Grammar School. He studied civil engineering at the University of Melbourne from 2004 to 2007. He then went back to complete a Master of Business Administration from 2014 to 2016, spending one term studying at the Hong Kong University of Science and Technology in 2015.

Smelt's career as a civil engineer led to him having several different roles over the years, including designing bridges for GHD, project engineer for the Department of Environment, Land, Water and Planning (where he constructed different bridges and culverts in Victoria), and a design risk manager in the Regional Rail Link project, where he supported extra rail lines and services to regional Victoria. He then also completed work as the Transport Sector Lead and Principal Engineer at Infrastructure Victoria, which produced the first 30-year infrastructure strategy in the state.

Northern Territory Legislative Assembly
Years	Term	Electoral division	Party
2026–present	15th	Nightcliff	Labor

Smelt and his wife, Susannah, moved to Darwin in 2019 to be closer to his wife's family.

In 2021, he became a candidate at the local government elections and was elected to the City of Darwin Council on a platform of making Darwin the ‘Outdoor Capital of Australia’.

In 2026, Smelt was announced as the Labor Party candidate for the 2026 Nightcliff by-election, where he won against the Greens candidate Suki Dorras-Walker.

Northern Territory Legislative Assembly
Preceded by Kat McNamara	Member for Nightcliff; 2026–present	Incumbent
