= Rod Oliver =

Australian politician

Member of the Northern Territory Legislative Assembly for Alice Springs
- In office 13 August 1977 – 6 June 1980
- Preceded by: Eric Manuell
- Succeeded by: Denis Collins

Personal details
- Born: Roderick Carson Oliver; 8 March 1922 Melbourne, Victoria, Australia
- Died: 24 September 2005 (aged 83) Alice Springs, Northern Territory, Australia
- Party: Country Liberal Party (1977–1979)
- Other political affiliations: Independent (1979–1980)
- Spouse: Eleanor Lewis
- Children: Four
- Occupation: Public servant

Military service
- Branch/service: Australian Army
- Years of service: 1941–1945
- Rank: Gunner
- Unit: 2/11th Field Regiment

Roderick Carson Oliver (8 March 1922 – 24 September 2005) was an Australian politician, who was a member of the Northern Territory Legislative Assembly for the seat of Alice Springs from 1977 to 1980.

== Early life ==
Oliver was born in Melbourne where his father was a tailor. During the Great Depression, his father decided to return the family to their grazing roots, and they moved to a sheep station in Euston, New South Wales when he was 12. At the age of 17, they moved to Balranald.

In 1941, Oliver enlisted in the Australian Imperial Force during World War II. During army training, he first visited Alice Springs where he would later return. After his discharge from the army, he met and married Eleanor Lewis, a hairdresser. They lived in Melbourne for several years, then moved to the Northern Territory where Oliver worked as a pastoral inspector for the Australian public service.

== Political career ==
Northern Territory Legislative Assembly
| Years | Term | Electoral division | Party |
|---|---|---|---|
| 1977–1980 | 2nd | Alice Springs | Country Liberal |
| 1979–1980 | Changed allegiance to: | | Independent |

He was the member for Alice Springs in the Northern Territory Legislative Assembly from 1977 to 1980. He was elected as a member of the Country Liberal Party, but after losing preselection for the 1980 election resigned from the party and unsuccessfully ran for re-election as an independent.

Northern Territory Legislative Assembly
| Preceded by Eric Manuell | Member for Alice Springs; 1977–1980 | Succeeded by Denis Collins |
