= Syd Stirling =

Australian politician

The Honourable Syd Stirling AM

Member of the Northern Territory Legislative Assembly for Nhulunbuy
- In office 27 October 1990 – 8 August 2008
- Preceded by: Dan Leo
- Succeeded by: Lynne Walker

Personal details
- Born: 16 December 1951 (age 74) Kyneton, Victoria, Australia
- Party: Labor Party
- Occupation: Teacher

Sydney James Stirling AM (born 16 December 1951) is a former Australian politician. He was the Labor member for Nhulunbuy in the Northern Territory Legislative Assembly from 1990 to 2008.

Northern Territory Legislative Assembly
Years	Term	Electoral division	Party
1990–1994	6th	Nhulunbuy	Labor
1994–1997	7th	Nhulunbuy	Labor
1997–2001	8th	Nhulunbuy	Labor
2001–2005	9th	Nhulunbuy	Labor
2005–2008	10th	Nhulunbuy	Labor

Stirling was born in Kyneton, Victoria, and worked as a teacher before his election to parliament. He challenged for the Labor leadership twice, but was easily defeated. In 1999 he was elected Deputy Leader to Clare Martin, and served as Deputy Chief Minister following the ALP's election win in 2001. He resigned along with Martin in November 2007, and retired at the 2008 election. He has served as president of the Northern Territory division of the Labor Party.

Stirling was appointed a Member of the Order of Australia in the 2021 Queen's Birthday Honours, for "significant service to the Legislative Assembly of the Northern Territory, and to the community".

Northern Territory Legislative Assembly
Preceded by Dan Leo	Member for Nhulunbuy; 1990–2008	Succeeded by Lynne Walker
