= Bernie Kilgariff =

Australian politician

Bernie Kilgariff AM

Senator for the Northern Territory
- In office 13 December 1975 – 10 July 1987
- Succeeded by: Grant Tambling

Personal details
- Born: 30 September 1923 Adelaide, South Australia
- Died: 13 April 2010 (aged 86) Alice Springs, Northern Territory
- Party: Country Liberal Party; National Country Party (federal, before 1979); Liberal Party (federal, since 1979)
- Spouse: Aileen Kilgariff
- Occupation: Farmer

Military service
- Allegiance: Australia
- Branch/service: Australian Army
- Years of service: 1943–1946
- Rank: Sergeant
- Unit: 2/5th Australian Infantry Battalion

Bernard Francis Kilgariff AM (30 September 1923 – 13 April 2010) was an Australian politician. He was one of the founders of the Country Liberal Party and served as a member of the Northern Territory Legislative Assembly which included a stint as Deputy Majority Leader. He was elected to the Australian Senate in 1975, and initially sat with the National Country Party until 1979, before sitting with the Liberal Party for the rest of his federal political career.

== Early life ==
Kilgariff was born in Adelaide, South Australia, and in 1929 arrived in Alice Springs (then called Stuart) with his family on one of the first Ghan trains from Adelaide. Kilgariff's father and uncles built and ran the Barrow Creek and Tennant Creek Hotels in the early 1930s.

He attended the Hartley Street School, and in 1938, the local Catholic school. His first job was building runways for the fledgling Connellan Airways. On 17 June 1943, Kilgariff enlisted in the Australian Army and served overseas. At the time of his discharge on 11 September 1946, he was a Sergeant in the 2/5th Australian Infantry Battalion.

== Political career ==
After the Second World War, Kilgariff became involved in community service, and was a member of the Northern Territory Housing Commission for thirteen years. In 1960, he was approached by the Administrator of the Northern Territory with regard to joining the Northern Territory Legislative Council. Kilgariff agreed and was elected, beginning a long political career. He supported the North Australia Party (NAP) at the 1965 Legislative Council elections.

Northern Territory Legislative Assembly
Years	Term	Electoral division	Party
1974–1975	1st	Alice Springs	Country Liberal

Kilgariff was one of the founders of the Country Liberal Party, an independent political party consisting of Country Party and Liberal Party members, to field candidates at the 1974 Legislative Council elections.

In 1974, the Legislative Council became the Northern Territory Legislative Assembly. Kilgariff was elected to the Assembly for Alice Springs, and was named the first Speaker of the Assembly. He resigned on 16 July 1975 to become Deputy Majority Leader (equivalent to a deputy premier in the states). Shortly after that, in November 1975, he resigned as Deputy Majority Leader and from the Assembly in order to run for one of two newly created seats in the Australian Senate for the Northern Territory in the 1975 federal election. Kilgariff, along with Ted Robertson (ALP) were elected as the Northern Territory's first Senators. Kilgariff sat with the parliamentary National Country Party room, due to the affiliation between the CLP and the National Country Party.

In 1979, after CLP also became affiliated with the Liberal Party and permitted its federal parliamentarians to sit in the "Party Rooms of their choice in Canberra", Kilgariff chose to sit with the parliamentary Liberal Party from 8 March 1979. This was so that the CLP have representation in both the Liberal Party and the National Country Party, with the only other CLP federal member Sam Calder continuing to sit with the National Country Party.

== Personal life and family ==
His daughter Fran is a former mayor of Alice Springs, who also ran as a Labor Party candidate in the 2005 Northern Territory general election. Bernie Kilgariff died on 13 April 2010, after suffering an ongoing illness. He was given a state funeral on 22 April.

== Honours ==
Kilgariff was awarded the Order of Australia Medal (OAM) in the 1989 Queen's Birthday Honours for continued service to the Northern Territory through the Northern Territory Landcare Council, the Anti-Rabbit Research Foundation, the Cattleman's Association, the Australia Day Council and St John Ambulance.

In the 1996 Queen's Birthday Honours, he was made a Member of the Order of Australia (AM).

In 2001, he was awarded the Centenary Medal for service to Australian society through parliament.

Northern Territory Legislative Assembly
New seat	Member for Alice Springs; 1974–1976	Succeeded by Eric Manuell
Parliament of Australia
New seat	Senator for the Northern Territory; 1975–1987; Served alongside: Ted Robertson	Succeeded by Grant Tambling
