= Lynne Walker (politician) =

Australian politician (born 1962)

Member of the Northern Territory Legislative Assembly for Nhulunbuy
- In office 9 August 2008 – 27 August 2016
- Preceded by: Syd Stirling
- Succeeded by: Yingiya Mark Guyula

Personal details
- Born: 19 June 1962 (age 64) Clare, South Australia
- Party: Labor Party
- Spouse: Lawrence Walker
- Education: Flinders University
- Occupation: Teacher

Lynne Michele Walker (born 19 June 1962) is a former Australian politician. She was a Labor member of the Northern Territory Legislative Assembly from 2008 to 2016, representing the seat of Nhulunbuy.

Northern Territory Legislative Assembly
Years	Term	Electoral division	Party
2008–2012	11th	Nhulunbuy	Labor
2012–2016	12th	Nhulunbuy	Labor

Walker was an outspoken critic of the former Country Liberals' government's management of the closure at the Rio Tinto aluminum refinery.

On 23 April 2015, Walker was installed as deputy leader under Michael Gunner, and hence Deputy Leader of the Opposition, following the Northern Territory leadership challenge.

Walker was widely tipped to become Deputy Chief Minister following the 2016 Territory election. Not only had Labor been far ahead of the governing CLP in polling, but Walker sat on a seemingly insurmountable majority of 13.7 percent. However, in a major upset, while Labor won the third-biggest majority in Territory history, Walker was defeated by independent candidate and Indigenous activist Yingiya Mark Guyula by eight votes. She suffered a swing of just under eight percent on the first count, and ultimately lost after CLP preferences flowed overwhelmingly to Guyula. The result, which was not known for days, saw Walker become the only Labor incumbent to be defeated at the election.

Walker sought to return to the legislature for Labor at the 2020 election, standing in Mulka, a reconfigured version of her old seat. She was defeated by Guyula on a swing of 13 percent.

Northern Territory Legislative Assembly
Preceded by Syd Stirling	Member for Nhulunbuy; 2008–2016	Succeeded by Yingiya Mark Guyula
