= Dawn Lawrie =

Australian (Northern Territory) politician

Dawn Lawrie AM
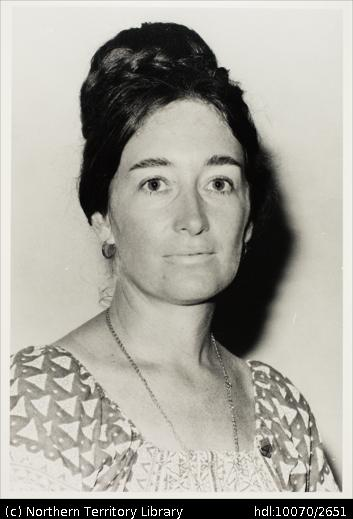
- 1976 portrait of Lawrie from Library & Archives NT

Member of the Northern Territory Legislative Assembly for Nightcliff
- In office 19 October 1974 – 2 December 1983
- Preceded by: Division created
- Succeeded by: Stephen Hatton

Administrator of the Cocos (Keeling) Islands
- In office 8 November 1988 – 27 November 1990
- Preceded by: Carolyn Stuart
- Succeeded by: Barry T. Cunningham

Personal details
- Born: 3 November 1938 (age 87) Melbourne, Victoria, Australia
- Party: Independent
- Children: Delia Lawrie
- Occupation: Politician

Alline Dawn Lawrie AM (born 3 November 1938) is an Australian former politician. She was the independent member for Nightcliff in the Northern Territory Legislative Assembly from 1974 to 1983; in the First Assembly, she and fellow independent Ron Withnall were the sole non-Country Liberal Party members.

== Early life ==
Lawrie was born in Melbourne in 1938. She moved to Alice Springs in the 1950s. She then settled in Darwin in 1960, where she worked as a public servant.

== Career ==
Northern Territory Legislative Assembly
Years	Term	Electoral division	Party
1974–1977	1st	Nightcliff	Independent
1977–1980	2nd	Nightcliff	Independent
1980–1983	3rd	Nightcliff	Independent

Lawrie joined the Northern Territory Parliament in 1971, firstly as an independent member of the Legislative Council (1971–74) then as the independent member for Nightcliff (1974–1983).

After politics, Lawrie and her husband established a community newspaper, the Palmerston & Northern Suburbs, which was published from 1983 to 1985. Lawrie was appointed as the first Regional Director for the Australian Human Rights and Equal Opportunity Commission in 1986. She served as the Administrator of the Cocos Keeling Islands from 1988 to 1990 and was the first NT Anti-Discrimination Commissioner. She is also a justice of the peace and a registered civil marriage celebrant.

She is the mother of Delia Lawrie, former leader of the Labor Party and the opposition in the Northern Territory.

Northern Territory Legislative Assembly
Division created	Member for Nightcliff; 1974–1983	Succeeded by Stephen Hatton
Government offices
Preceded by Carolyn Stuart	Administrator of the Cocos (Keeling) Islands; 1988–1990	Succeeded by Barry T. Cunningham
