= Dan Leo =

Australian politician

Northern Territory Legislative Assembly
Years	Term	Electoral division	Party
1980–1983	3rd	Nhulunbuy	Labor
1983–1987	4th	Nhulunbuy	Labor
1987–1990	5th	Nhulunbuy	Labor

Daniel Murray Leo (born 14 August 1950) is a former Australian politician. He was the Labor member for Nhulunbuy in the Northern Territory Legislative Assembly from 1980 to 1990.

Northern Territory Legislative Assembly
Preceded by Milton Ballantyne	Member for Nhulunbuy; 1980–1990	Succeeded by Syd Stirling
