= Kat McNamara =

Australian politician

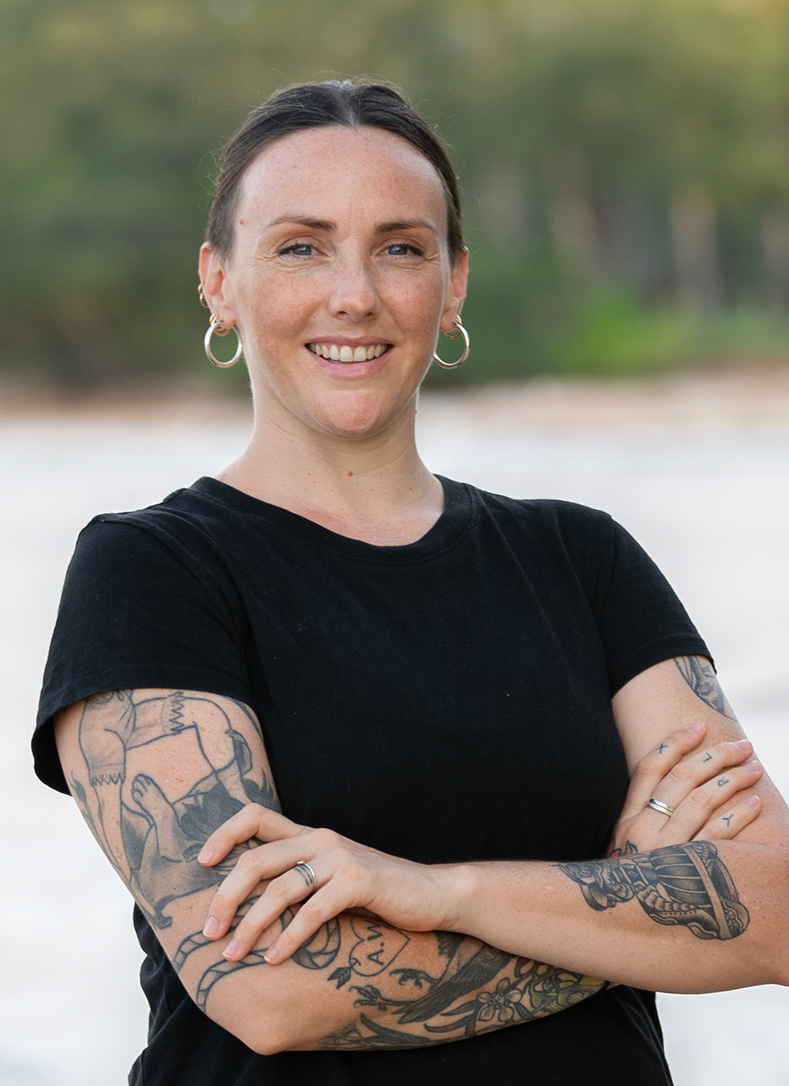

Member of the Northern Territory Legislative Assembly for Nightcliff
- In office 26 August 2024 – 9 February 2026
- Preceded by: Natasha Fyles
- Succeeded by: Ed Smelt

Personal details
- Born: Kat Danger McNamara Melbourne, Victoria, Australia
- Party: Greens
- Website: greens.org.au/nt/person/kat-mcnamara

Kat Danger McNamara is an Australian politician who served as the member for Nightcliff in the Northern Territory Legislative Assembly from August 2024 until February 2026.

They were elected at the 2024 general election, defeating Labor MP and former chief minister Natasha Fyles, becoming the first member of the Greens to be elected to the NT parliament.

McNamara is non-binary, making them the first openly gender-diverse politician in Australia at a state or territory level. They use they/them and she/her pronouns.

On 9 February 2026, McNamara resigned from the Northern Territory Legislative Assembly, citing health issues. They were succeeded by Labor member Ed Smelt in the subsequent by election on 7 March 2026.

Northern Territory Legislative Assembly
Preceded by Natasha Fyles	Member for Nightcliff; 2024–2026	Succeeded by Ed Smelt
