= Electoral division of Mulka =

Electoral division of the Northern Territory, Australia

Mulka Northern Territory—Legislative Assembly
- Interactive map of boundaries as of the 2024 election
- Territory: Northern Territory
- Created: 2020
- MP: Yiwarr McGrath
- Party: Labor
- Namesake: Yolŋu word meaning 'dry area'
- Electors: 6,930 (2026)
- Area: 14,736 km^{2} (5,689.6 sq mi)
- Demographic: Remote
Electorates around Mulka:
| Timor Sea | Timor Sea | Timor Sea |
| Arnhem | Mulka | Gulf of Carpentaria |
| Arnhem | Gulf of Carpentaria | Gulf of Carpentaria |

Mulka is an electoral division of the Northern Territory Legislative Assembly in Australia. It was created in a 2019 redistribution for the 2020 general election, replacing the electoral division of Nhulunbuy. At that election, independent Nhulunbuy incumbent Yingiya Mark Guyula won the seat in a tightly contested rematch of the 2016 general election, with the Territory Labor Party being his only opposition.

He retained his seat at the 2024 general election with a large swing in his favour, against one opposing candidate, from the Country Liberal Party. In August 2026, Guyula resigned from the assembly, triggering the by-election, which was won by Yiwarr McGrath of the Labor Party.

Mulka is located in eastern Arnhem Land and is divided into two parts. The major population centre is the town of Nhulunbuy.

== Members for Mulka ==
| Member | Party | Term |
|---|---|---|
| Yingiya Mark Guyula | Independent | 2020–2026 |
| Yiwarr McGrath | Labor | 2026–present |

== Election results ==
2026 Mulka by-election
| Party | Candidate | Votes | % | ±% |
|---|---|---|---|---|
| Labor | Yiwarr McGrath | 1,871 | 77.6 | +77.6 |
| Independent | Andrew Blamey | 541 | 22.4 | +22.4 |
| Total formal votes | | 2,412 | 97.1 | +0.0 |
| Informal votes | | 71 | 2.9 | +0.0 |
| Turnout | | 2,483 | 36.2 | TBC |
| Labor gain from Independent | | | | |

Results are not final. Last updated on 14 September 2026 at 12:35 pm ACST.

2024 Northern Territory general election: Mulka
| Party | Candidate | Votes | % | ±% |
|---|---|---|---|---|
| Independent | Yingiya Mark Guyula | 2,299 | 75.2 | +20.1 |
| Country Liberal | Allen Fanning | 758 | 24.8 | +24.8 |
| Total formal votes | | 3,057 | 97.1 | −0.6 |
| Informal votes | | 90 | 2.9 | +0.6 |
| Turnout | | 3,147 | 46.0 | |
| Independent hold | | Swing | +20.1 | |
