= Milton Ballantyne =

Australian politician

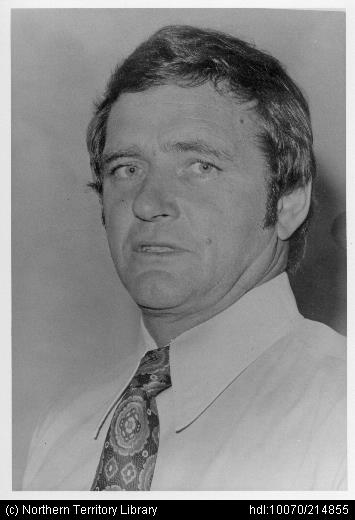
Ballantyne in 1976

Northern Territory Legislative Assembly
Years	Term	Electoral division	Party
1974–1977	1st	Nhulunbuy	Country Liberal
1977–1980	2nd	Nhulunbuy	Country Liberal

Milton James Ballantyne (5 November 1928 – 15 December 2015) was an Australian politician. He was the Country Liberal Party member for Nhulunbuy in the Northern Territory Legislative Assembly from 1974 to 1980. Ballantyne died in 2015 aged 87.

Northern Territory Legislative Assembly
Preceded by New seat	Member for Nhulunbuy; 1974–1980	Succeeded by Dan Leo
