= Noel Padgham-Purich =

Australian politician

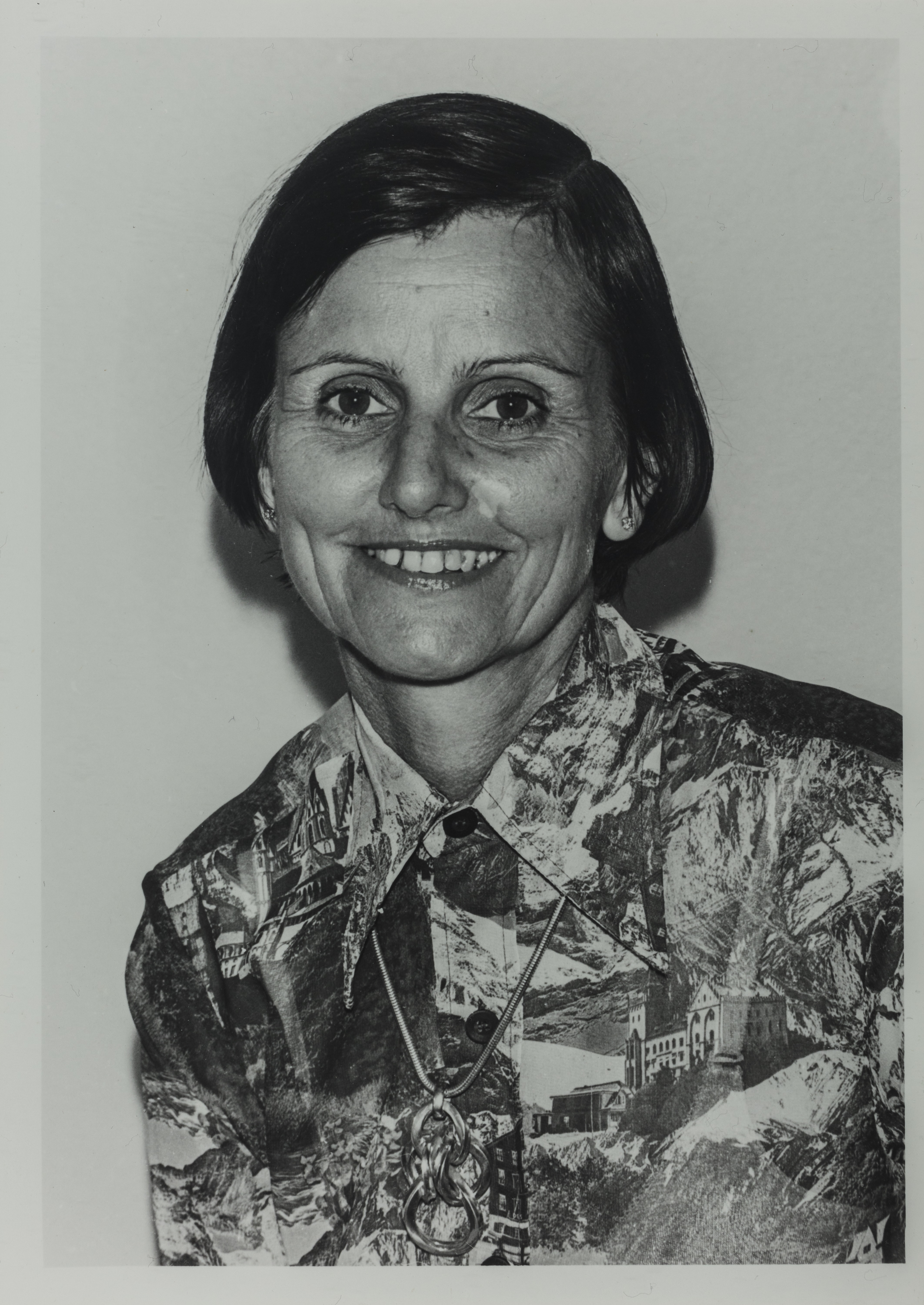
Padgham-Purich in 1979

Cecilia Noel Padgham-Purich AM (born 25 December 1927) is an Australian former politician. She was a member of the Northern Territory Legislative Assembly from 1977 to 1997, representing Tiwi until 1983, Koolpinyah until 1990 and Nelson thereafter.

Northern Territory Legislative Assembly
Years	Term	Electoral division	Party
1977–1980	2nd	Tiwi	Country Liberal
1980–1983	3rd	Tiwi	Country Liberal
1983–1987	4th	Koolpinyah	Country Liberal
1987–1990	5th	Koolpinyah	Independent
1990–1994	6th	Nelson	Independent
1994–1997	7th	Nelson	Independent

Born in Quairading, Western Australia, Padgham-Purich was initially elected as a member of the Country Liberal Party, and served as Minister for Housing and Conservation from 1983 to 1984 under Paul Everingham and Ian Tuxworth. In 1987 she lost CLP preselection, but was re-elected as an independent. She retired in 1997 and endorsed another independent candidate, Dave Tollner, who narrowly failed to win election. Her daughter, Kezia Purick, was elected to the seat of Goyder as a CLP member in 2008. Noel has six children, Melissa, Peregrine, Gervase, Kezia, Plaxy and Thisbe.

Northern Territory Legislative Assembly
Preceded by Hyacinth Tungutalum	Member for Tiwi; 1977–1983	Division abolished
Division created	Member for Koolpinyah; 1983–1990	Division abolished
Division created	Member for Nelson; 1990–1997	Succeeded by Chris Lugg
