= Yingiya Mark Guyula =

Australian politician

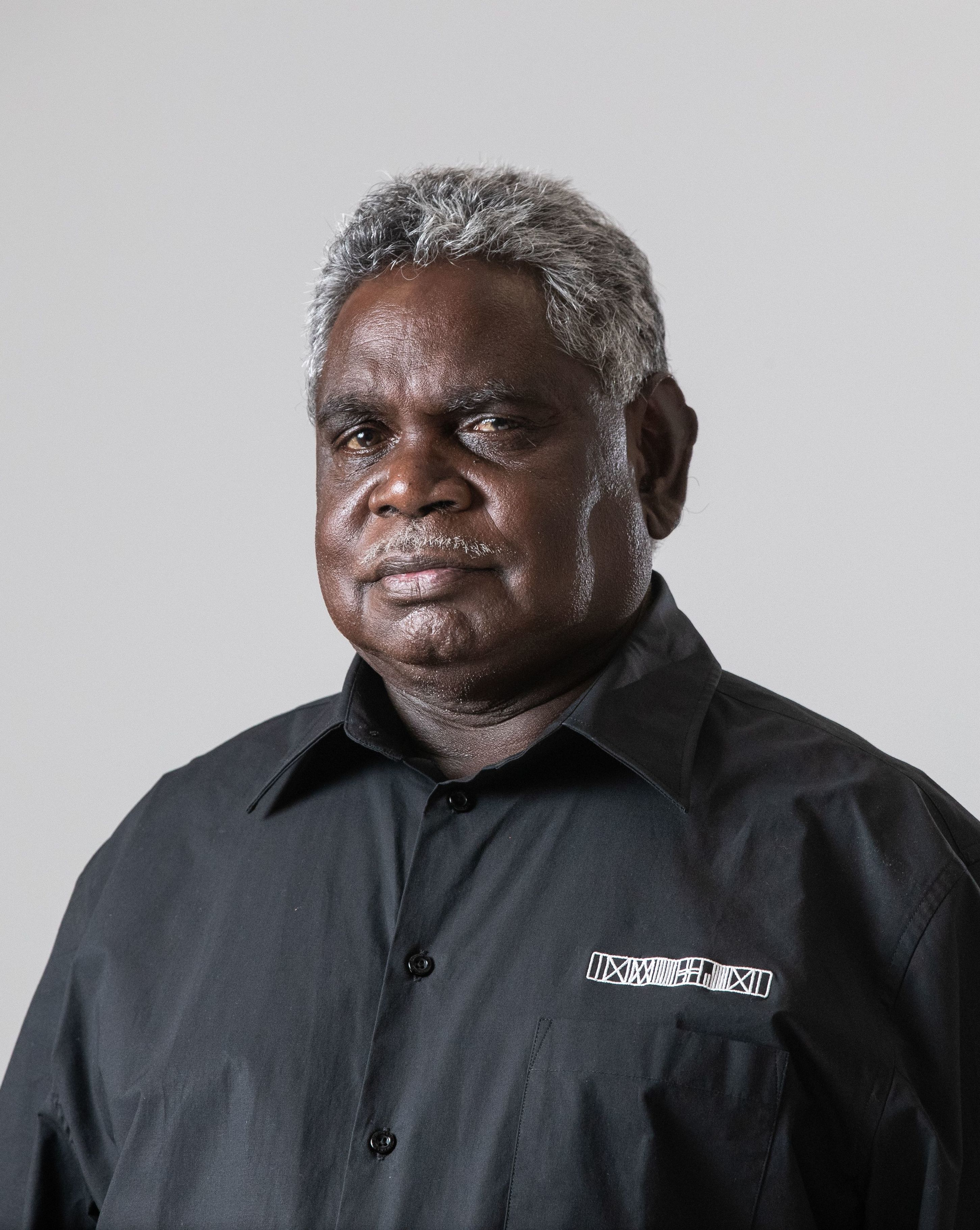

Member of the Northern Territory Legislative Assembly for Mulka
- In office 22 August 2020 – 19 August 2026
- Preceded by: New seat
- Succeeded by: Yiwarr McGrath

Member of the Northern Territory Legislative Assembly for Nhulunbuy
- In office 27 August 2016 – 22 August 2020
- Preceded by: Lynne Walker
- Succeeded by: Seat abolished

Personal details
- Born: Mirrngadja, Northern Territory, Australia
- Party: Independent
- Occupation: Pilot; Politician
- Website: yingiya.net

Yingiya Mark Guyula (Aboriginal pronunciation: [jiŋija ɡʊjula]) is a former Australian politician and a Yolŋu man of the Djambarrpuyŋu clan and the Liya-Dhälinymirr people. He served as an independent member of the Northern Territory Legislative Assembly for the seat of Mulka in north-east Arnhem Land. He previously represented Nhulunbuy from 2016 to 2020. He was the only independent Indigenous member of parliament in the Northern Territory and campaigned on a platform of self-determination for Yolŋu people. Guyula resigned from his position on 19 August 2026 citing concerns with CLP policies.

== Early life ==
Guyula was born and raised in Mirrngadja in Arnhem Land where he lived on his country with his family and extended kin learning a Yolŋu way of life. At the age of 10 he began a western education at Shepherdson College on Elcho Island and later went on to attend Dhulpuma College and the Nhulunbuy Area School. He then returned home to his family for a time before moving to Nhulunbuy to work with MAF (Mission Aviation Fellowship), being trained in aircraft maintenance and engineering. Eventually he trained as a pilot in Victoria and became the first Yolŋu commercial pilot for the region in 1983.

== Career ==
Guyula went on to work in cross-cultural education, holding various roles in local schools, regional councils and community organisations. He is also a NAATI-accredited interpreter and worked as a senior lecturer at Charles Darwin University in its Yolŋu Studies program for many years.

In 2016 he announced his candidacy for the 2016 Northern Territory election. Up against the incumbent Labor member for Nhulunbuy and Deputy Leader of the Opposition, Lynne Walker, he campaigned on a platform of self-determination and Treaty between Indigenous and non-Indigenous Australians, in preference to the proposal for recognition of Indigenous Australians in the Constitution of Australia. As returns came in on election night, Guyula gradually closed the gap with Walker, and eventually took a narrow lead as Country Liberal preferences flowed overwhelmingly to him. After a recount, he won by eight votes. His victory came as a major upset, especially given Labor's landslide victory at that election; Walker would have become Deputy Chief Minister had she retained her seat.

Shortly after the election, Guyula attracted criticism from the new Chief Minister, Michael Gunner after he claimed with regards to domestic violence that "a lot of the time, women start the fighting and men end up in jail". Guyula has since said that many young people need support to build strong relationships, and that violence against women is not lawful in Yolngu culture, "As a senior leader, I need to be clear: the family violence we are seeing in our communities is not lawful – it is breaking the law".

Shortly before being sworn into parliament, it was claimed that Guyula was a member of the Milingimbi Local Authority, and thus could be ineligible to run for parliament. The matter was referred to the Court of Disputed Returns. The court dismissed the case on 1 December 2016, after reaching an agreement with the Northern Territory Electoral Commission.

In early 2017 Guyula used parliamentary privilege to name nine children taken into care by the Northern Territory Government, who he alleged had been removed from their communities, contravening the principles of kinship care. Naming children in state care outside parliament is a criminal offence carrying a maximum two-year sentence of imprisonment. The names of the children were subsequently removed from Hansard. Guyula defended his actions telling NITV that "I had to name nine children according to our law, Indigenous law... The NT government are not following the law. They broke their own law". Although strongly criticising his actions, the NT Children's Commissioner remarked that she too was concerned not enough was being done to find out if Aboriginal children could be safely placed closer to home.

After nearly three years of requesting that Standing Orders be amended so that he could speak his first language of Djambarrpuyŋu, he became the first parliamentarian in Australia to make a substantial speech in an Aboriginal language using an interpreter on the Chamber floor. In this speech he criticised successive CLP and Labor governments for dismantling bi-lingual and culturally appropriate education, and for failing remote Aboriginal communities.

At the 2018 Garma Festival he presented Prince Charles with a traditional letter stick that asserted ongoing Yolŋu sovereignty and requested that Prince Charles mediate with the Federal Government to acknowledge Yolŋu sovereignty and promote a pathway to Treaty. In that same year Guyula travelled to New York to speak at the United Nations's Permanent Forum on Indigenous Issues to advocate for stronger international pressure on the Australian and Northern Territory governments to recognise Yolŋu sovereignty, to enter into treaty negotiations directly with Indigenous nations and to support their rights to bi-lingual education.

In 2019, Guyula introduced a motion to parliament calling for a parliamentary committee to inquire into policing on Aboriginal land to build better relationships between communities and police, and to empower elders to uphold their cultural authority. Prior to this, it had been revealed by Guyula's questioning that 100% of children in detention in the NT are Indigenous.

Guyula led opposition to the NT Government's proposed Burial and Cremations Bill in 2019, which could have seen Aboriginal people fined tens of thousands of dollars or imprisoned for up to two years for conducting traditional ceremonies as they are outside of government recognised cemeteries. Following his opposition, which was backed by Aboriginal land councils and justice agencies, the government withdrew the bill. Guyula remarked that governments are not listening to or respecting Aboriginal people and sovereignty; "I want to have a Government that is genuine about local decision-making and handing control back to the people. We shouldn’t have to fight for the livelihood of our culture. It should be a partnership".

Guyula was reelected at the 2020 general election in a head-to-head rematch with Walker for the newly-created seat of Mulka which replaced Nhulunbuy at that election. He picked up a 4.9-point swing in his favour.

Guyula resigned for the Northern Territory Legislative Assembly in August 2026, saying he could not "sit opposite a government who are not willing to listen or form partnerships". His resignation triggered the 2026 Mulka by-election.

== Political views ==
Guyula was one of four MLAs who opposed a bill that decriminalised abortion in the Northern Territory.

During his time in parliament, Guyula has advocated for policies and programs that respect and work with Yolŋu law, culture and language.

Guyula is opposed to fracking in the Northern Territory and has stated his support for the development of the renewable energy industry. He has said in parliament in relation to the NT Government's decision to lift the moratorium on fracking that, "Strong action on climate change means that we do not support fracking and we move towards renewable energy.

Although largely elected by the bush vote, which is made up of predominantly Aboriginal communities and homelands (outstations), Guyula has also advocated for issues that affect the mining town and service hub of Nhulunbuy, from which the first electorate he represented takes its name. This includes on issues such as the high cost of living, travel and services in and around the town. Guyula has also repeatedly criticised the NT and federal governments, along with telecommunications provider Telstra, for their poor record of service to the town and surrounding region, claiming it is part of a broader neglect of remote towns and communities.

Guyula has advocated for Indigenous nation's rights to cultural education, and campaigned for better relations between Indigenous people and law enforcement, and the over-imprisonment of Aboriginal persons.

Northern Territory Legislative Assembly
Preceded by Lynne Walker	Member for Nhulunbuy; 2016–2020	Seat abolished
New seat	Member for Mulka; 2020–2026	Succeeded by Yiwarr McGrath
