= Electoral division of Nightcliff =

Coordinates: 12.383°S 130.849°E

Nightcliff Northern Territory—Legislative Assembly
- Interactive map of boundaries as of the 2024 election
- Territory: Northern Territory
- Created: 1974
- MP: Ed Smelt
- Party: Labor
- Namesake: Nightcliff
- Electors: 6,021 (2026)
- Area: 4 km^{2} (1.5 sq mi)
- Demographic: Urban
Electorates around Nightcliff:
Timor Sea	Timor Sea	Casuarina
Timor Sea	Nightcliff	Johnston
Timor Sea	Fannie Bay	Johnston

Nightcliff is an electoral division of the Legislative Assembly in Australia's Northern Territory. It was first created in 1974, and takes its name from the suburb of the same name. Nightcliff is one of the smallest electorates in the Territory, covering only 4.28 km² and taking in the Darwin suburb of Nightcliff, most of Rapid Creek and a small area of Coconut Grove. There were 6,021 people enrolled in the electorate as of July 2026.

== History ==
For most of the first quarter-century of its existence, Nightcliff was somewhat marginal, with incumbents generally holding the seat for several years. The seat's first member, independent Dawn Lawrie, was one of only two non-Country Liberal Party members in the first parliament. Upon her retirement in 1983, it was taken by the CLP's Stephen Hatton, who later went on to become Chief Minister of the Territory. Hatton retired in 2001, and while Nightcliff was not a particularly safe CLP seat, it was widely expected that Hatton's son Jason would succeed him. However, he was unexpectedly defeated by Labor Party candidate Jane Aagaard on a large swing that, after preferences, made Nightcliff technically a safe Labor seat. Her victory was part of a Labor sweep of north Darwin that enabled the party to win government for the first time.

Aagaard served a controversial stint as Health Minister and was ultimately axed from the ministry altogether, which led some commentators to suggest that she was in danger of losing her seat at the 2005 election. Despite this, she had very little difficulty holding the seat amid the massive Labor wave that swept through the Territory; after preferences she actually picked up a healthy swing of 8.5 percent, with almost double the votes of the CLP challenger. She was subsequently installed as Speaker of the Northern Territory Legislative Assembly–the first Labor member to hold the post.

Aagaard retired in 2012, and despite a significant CLP victory in that year's election, the seat was retained for Labor by Natasha Fyles with a majority of 9.2 percent. At the 2016 election, Labor's massive landslide saw Fyles consolidate her hold on the seat; with a swing in her favour of 17.8 percent and a majority of 26.9 percent, Nightcliff became the safest seat in the Territory. She was re-elected in 2020 with only a 2.5 percent swing against her.

Following the departure of Chief Minister Michael Gunner, Fyles was elected as his replacement by the Labor caucus and served from May 2022 until December 2023, resigning amid conflict-of-interest allegations due to holding numerous undisclosed shares in fracking and mining operations approved during her tenure. She unexpectedly lost re-election at the 2024 election, being narrowly defeated by Greens candidate Kat McNamara, with a majority of 0.4 percent.

McNamara resigned from the Legislative Assembly on 9 February 2026, citing health issues. In the subsequent by-election Ed Smelt of the Labor Party won the election, thus regaining the seat for the Labor.

== Members for Nightcliff ==
Member	Party	Term
Dawn Lawrie	Independent	1974–1983
Stephen Hatton	Country Liberal	1983–2001
Jane Aagaard	Labor	2001–2012
Natasha Fyles	Labor	2012–2024
Kat McNamara	Greens	2024–2026
Ed Smelt	Labor	2026–present

== Election results ==
2026 Nightcliff by-election
Party	Candidate	Votes	%	±%
Greens	Suki Dorras-Walker	1,216	33.4	+11.5
Labor	Ed Smelt	1,052	28.9	−3.9
Country Liberal	Anjan Paudel	738	20.3	−3.4
Independent	Phil Scott	632	17.4	+17.4
Total formal votes		3,638	97.7	+0.6
Informal votes		85	2.3	−0.5
Turnout		3,638	62.7	−14.0
Two-candidate-preferred result
Labor	Ed Smelt	1,898	52.2	+2.6
Greens	Suki Dorras-Walker	1,740	47.8	−2.6
Labor gain from Greens		Swing	+2.6	
