= Results of the 1994 Northern Territory general election =

Northern Territory general election, 4 June 1994 Legislative Assembly << 1990–1997 >>
Enrolled voters	95,007				
Votes cast	76,638		Turnout	80.7%	
Informal votes	2,917		Informal	3.8%	
Summary of votes by party
Party	Primary votes	%	Swing	Seats	Change
Country Liberal	38,266	51.9%	+3.1%	17	+3
Labor	30,507	41.4%	+4.7%	7	–2
Independent	4,338	5.9%	–0.8%	1	–1
Greens	552	0.8%	–2.2%	0	± 0
Democrats	58	0.1%	+0.1%	0	± 0
Total	73,721			25	
Two-party-preferred
Country Liberal	41,485	56.3%	–0.7		
Labor	32,236	43.7%	+0.7		

This is a list of electoral division results for the Northern Territory 1994 General Election in Australia.

== Results by electoral division ==
=== Arafura ===
1994 Northern Territory general election: Arafura
Party	Candidate	Votes	%	±%
Labor	Maurice Rioli	1,381	60.8	−6.3
Independent	Colin Newton	540	23.8	+23.8
Country Liberal	Lothar Siebert	349	15.4	−17.5
Total formal votes		2,270	90.4	
Informal votes		240	9.6	
Turnout		2,510	67.6	
Two-party-preferred result
Labor	Maurice Rioli	1,481	65.3	−1.8
Country Liberal	Lothar Siebert	789	34.7	+1.8
Labor hold		Swing	−1.8	

- The two candidate preferred vote was not counted between the Labor and Independent candidates for Arafura.

=== Araluen ===
1994 Northern Territory general election: Araluen
Party	Candidate	Votes	%	±%
Country Liberal	Eric Poole	2,091	70.1	+13.0
Labor	Mescal Yates	892	29.9	+11.5
Total formal votes		2,983	95.5	
Informal votes		140	4.5	
Turnout		3,123	83.4	
Country Liberal hold		Swing	−0.5	

=== Arnhem ===
1994 Northern Territory general election: Arnhem
Party	Candidate	Votes	%	±%
Labor	Wes Lanhupuy	1,723	74.5	+18.7
Country Liberal	Veronica Januschka	590	25.5	−7.4
Total formal votes		2,313	94.4	
Informal votes		136	5.6	
Turnout		2,449	62.6	
Labor hold		Swing	+13.3	

=== Barkly ===
1994 Northern Territory general election: Barkly
Party	Candidate	Votes	%	±%
Country Liberal	Paul Ruger	1,358	46.2	+13.8
Labor	Maggie Hickey	1,338	45.5	+2.1
Independent	Geoffrey Freeman	246	8.4	+8.4
Total formal votes		2,942	95.8	
Informal votes		128	4.2	
Turnout		3,070	78.2	
Two-party-preferred result
Labor	Maggie Hickey	1,519	51.6	+1.1
Country Liberal	Paul Ruger	1,423	48.4	−1.1
Labor hold		Swing	+1.1	

=== Braitling ===
1994 Northern Territory general election: Braitling
Party	Candidate	Votes	%	±%
Country Liberal	Loraine Braham	2,183	71.0	+10.1
Labor	Charles Carter	894	29.0	+10.5
Total formal votes		3,077	96.1	
Informal votes		126	3.9	
Turnout		3,203	82.4	
Country Liberal hold		Swing	+2.4	

=== Brennan ===
1994 Northern Territory general election: Brennan
Party	Candidate	Votes	%	±%
Country Liberal	Denis Burke	1,660	52.4	+8.0
Labor	Geoffrey Carter	1,079	34.1	+2.9
Independent	Max Ortmann	428	13.5	+13.5
Total formal votes		3,167	96.4	−0.4
Informal votes		117	3.6	+0.4
Turnout		3,284	82.2	
Two-party-preferred result
Country Liberal	Denis Burke	1,960	61.9	+1.8
Labor	Geoffrey Carter	1,207	38.1	−1.8
Country Liberal hold		Swing	+1.8	

=== Casuarina ===
1994 Northern Territory general election: Casuarina
Party	Candidate	Votes	%	±%
Country Liberal	Peter Adamson	1,650	55.4	−0.7
Labor	Clare Martin	1,328	44.6	+7.8
Total formal votes		2,978	96.1	
Informal votes		119	3.9	
Turnout		3,097	87.3	
Country Liberal hold		Swing	−6.1	

=== Fannie Bay ===
1994 Northern Territory general election: Fannie Bay
Party	Candidate	Votes	%	±%
Country Liberal	Marshall Perron	1,695	57.9	−0.2
Labor	Sue Bradley	1,232	42.1	+15.3
Total formal votes		2,927	96.7	
Informal votes		99	3.3	
Turnout		3,026	87.2	
Country Liberal hold		Swing	−2.1	

=== Goyder ===
1994 Northern Territory general election: Goyder
Party	Candidate	Votes	%	±%
Country Liberal	Terry McCarthy	1,781	53.7	+11.0
Labor	Jamie Johnson	1,040	31.4	+8.7
Independent	Gerry Wood	495	14.9	+14.9
Total formal votes		3,316	97.6	+0.9
Informal votes		80	2.4	−0.9
Turnout		3,396	82.4	
Two-party-preferred result
Country Liberal	Terry McCarthy	2,181	65.8	+0.2
Labor	Jamie Johnson	1,135	34.2	−0.2
Country Liberal hold		Swing	+0.2	

=== Greatorex ===
1994 Northern Territory general election: Greatorex
Party	Candidate	Votes	%	±%
Country Liberal	Richard Lim	1,371	43.9	+12.2
Labor	Kerrie Nelson	918	29.4	+7.7
Independent	Denis Collins	835	26.7	−5.0
Total formal votes		3,124	98.2	
Informal votes		56	1.8	
Turnout		3,180	85.4	
Two-party-preferred result
Country Liberal	Richard Lim	1,945	62.3	−10.8
Labor	Kerrie Nelson	1,179	37.7	+10.8
Country Liberal gain from Independent		Swing	N/A	

=== Jingili ===
1994 Northern Territory general election: Jingili
Party	Candidate	Votes	%	±%
Country Liberal	Rick Setter	1,745	54.3	−4.3
Labor	Ted Warren	1,467	45.7	+10.5
Total formal votes		3,212	94.8	
Informal votes		175	5.2	
Turnout		3,387	86.0	
Country Liberal hold		Swing	−4.9	

=== Karama ===
1994 Northern Territory general election: Karama
Party	Candidate	Votes	%	±%
Country Liberal	Mick Palmer	1,533	50.8	−4.5
Labor	John Tobin	1,320	43.7	+6.3
Independent	Christopher Inskip	107	3.6	+3.6
Democrats	Goncalo Pinto	58	1.9	+1.9
Total formal votes		3,018	96.6	
Informal votes		107	3.4	
Turnout		3,125	86.7	
Two-party-preferred result
Country Liberal	Mick Palmer	1,640	54.3	−6.5
Labor	John Tobin	1,378	45.7	+6.5
Country Liberal hold		Swing	−6.5	

=== Katherine ===
1994 Northern Territory general election: Katherine
Party	Candidate	Votes	%	±%
Country Liberal	Mike Reed	2,127	70.6	+17.4
Labor	Gabriela Maynard	885	29.4	+7.8
Total formal votes		3,012	95.6	
Informal votes		139	4.4	
Turnout		3,151	84.5	
Country Liberal hold		Swing	−0.4	

=== Leanyer ===
1994 Northern Territory general election: Leanyer
Party	Candidate	Votes	%	±%
Country Liberal	Fred Finch	1,912	60.1	+1.6
Labor	Cossimo Russo	1,269	39.9	+4.1
Total formal votes		3,181	96.1	
Informal votes		129	3.9	
Turnout		3,310	86.5	
Country Liberal hold		Swing	−1.8	

=== MacDonnell ===
1994 Northern Territory general election: MacDonnell
Party	Candidate	Votes	%	±%
Labor	Neil Bell	1,682	65.9	+12.7
Country Liberal	Pamela Waudby	870	34.1	+8.6
Total formal votes		2,552	96.5	
Informal votes		93	3.5	
Turnout		2,645	66.5	
Labor hold		Swing	+7.4	

=== Millner ===
1994 Northern Territory general election: Millner
Party	Candidate	Votes	%	±%
Country Liberal	Phil Mitchell	1,445	47.0	+3.7
Labor	Ken Parish	1,305	42.4	−14.3
Greens	Ilana Eldridge	325	10.6	+10.6
Total formal votes		3,075	96.4	
Informal votes		114	3.6	
Turnout		3,189	82.9	
Two-party-preferred result
Country Liberal	Phil Mitchell	1,574	51.2	+7.9
Labor	Ken Parish	1,501	48.8	−7.9
Country Liberal gain from Labor		Swing	+7.9	

=== Nelson ===
1994 Northern Territory general election: Nelson
Party	Candidate	Votes	%	±%
Country Liberal	Chris Lugg	1,528	43.7	+23.7
Independent	Noel Padgham-Purich	1,102	31.5	−9.5
Labor	Wayne Connop	864	24.7	−8.1
Total formal votes		3,494	97.9	−0.4
Informal votes		76	2.1	+0.4
Turnout		3,570	89.1	
Two-party-preferred result
Country Liberal	Chris Lugg	1,574	66.6	−7.3
Labor	Wayne Connop	1,501	33.4	+7.3
Two-candidate-preferred result
Independent	Noel Padgham-Purich	1,855	53.1	−10.6
Country Liberal	Chris Lugg	1,639	46.9	+10.6
Independent hold		Swing	−10.6	

=== Nhulunbuy ===
1994 Northern Territory general election: Nhulunbuy
Party	Candidate	Votes	%	±%
Labor	Syd Stirling	1,350	54.6	−4.5
Country Liberal	Michael O'Shea	1,124	45.4	+4.5
Total formal votes		2,474	94.3	
Informal votes		149	5.7	
Turnout		2,623	70.6	
Labor hold		Swing	−4.5	

=== Nightcliff ===
1994 Northern Territory general election: Nightcliff
Party	Candidate	Votes	%	±%
Country Liberal	Stephen Hatton	1,692	56.3	−4.1
Labor	Paul Henderson	1,135	37.8	+15.3
Democrats	Robert Adams	180	6.0	+6.0
Total formal votes		3,007	97.1	
Informal votes		89	2.9	
Turnout		3,096	84.3	
Two-party-preferred result
Country Liberal	Stephen Hatton	1,792	59.6	−2.5
Labor	Paul Henderson	1,215	40.4	+2.5
Country Liberal hold		Swing	−2.5	

=== Palmerston ===
1994 Northern Territory general election: Palmerston
Party	Candidate	Votes	%	±%
Country Liberal	Barry Coulter	1,938	59.1	+2.0
Labor	Kevin Diflo	1,129	34.4	+2.9
Independent	David Elliott	214	6.5	+6.5
Total formal votes		3,281	97.6	
Informal votes		81	2.4	
Turnout		3,362	87.1	
Two-party-preferred result
Country Liberal	Barry Coulter	2,063	62.9	+1.2
Labor	Kevin Diflo	1,218	37.1	−1.2
Country Liberal hold		Swing	+1.2	

=== Port Darwin ===
1994 Northern Territory general election: Port Darwin
Party	Candidate	Votes	%	±%
Country Liberal	Shane Stone	1,909	60.3	+6.8
Labor	Rodney Haritos	1,032	32.6	+10.7
Greens	Andrea Jones	227	7.2	−14.0
Total formal votes		3,168	97.4	
Informal votes		83	2.6	
Turnout		3,251	83.0	
Two-party-preferred result
Country Liberal	Shane Stone	1,988	62.7	−1.1
Labor	Rodney Haritos	1,180	37.3	+1.1
Country Liberal hold		Swing	−1.1	

=== Sanderson ===
1994 Northern Territory general election: Sanderson
Party	Candidate	Votes	%	±%
Country Liberal	Daryl Manzie	1,699	57.1	+3.2
Labor	Denise Horvath	1,274	42.9	+11.4
Total formal votes		2,973	96.8	
Informal votes		98	3.2	
Turnout		3,071	86.9	
Country Liberal hold		Swing	−1.9	

=== Stuart ===
1994 Northern Territory general election: Stuart
Party	Candidate	Votes	%	±%
Labor	Brian Ede	1,228	51.8	−2.8
Country Liberal	John Bohning	1,140	48.2	+23.5
Total formal votes		2,368	95.2	
Informal votes		118	4.8	
Turnout		2,486	66.7	
Labor hold		Swing	−7.9	

=== Victoria River ===
1994 Northern Territory general election: Victoria River
Party	Candidate	Votes	%	±%
Country Liberal	Tim Baldwin	1,380	50.8	+2.3
Labor	Gary Cartwright	1,148	42.2	−9.3
Independent	John Noble	191	7.0	+7.0
Total formal votes		2,719	95.9	
Informal votes		116	4.1	
Turnout		2,835	73.0	
Two-party-preferred result
Country Liberal	Tim Baldwin	1,480	54.4	+5.9
Labor	Gary Cartwright	1,239	45.6	−5.9
Country Liberal gain from Labor		Swing	+5.9	

=== Wanguri ===
1994 Northern Territory general election: Wanguri
Party	Candidate	Votes	%	±%
Labor	John Bailey	1,594	51.6	−4.6
Country Liberal	Steve Balch	1,496	48.4	+4.6
Total formal votes		3,090	96.6	
Informal votes		109	3.4	
Turnout		3,199	86.0	
Labor hold		Swing	−4.6	

== See also ==
- 1994 Northern Territory general election
- Members of the Northern Territory Legislative Assembly, 1994–1997
