= Results of the 1997 Northern Territory general election =

Northern Territory general election, 30 August 1997 Legislative Assembly << 1994–2001 >>
Enrolled voters	101,886				
Votes cast	80,479		Turnout	79.0	–1.7%
Informal votes	4,161		Informal	5.0%	+1.2%
Summary of votes by party
Party	Primary votes	%	Swing	Seats	Change
Country Liberal	41,722	54.7%	+2.8%	18	+1
Labor	29,365	38.5%	-2.9%	7	±0
Independent	4,327	5.7%	–1.0%	0	–1
Democrats	484	0.6%	+0.6%	0	± 0
Greens	420	0.6%	+0.6%	0	± 0
Total	76,318			25	
Two-party-preferred
Country Liberal		57.9%	+1.6		
Labor		42.1%	–1.6		

This is a list of electoral division results for the Northern Territory 1997 General Election in Australia.

== Results by electoral division ==
=== Arafura ===
1997 Northern Territory general election: Arafura
Party	Candidate	Votes	%	±%
Labor	Maurice Rioli	1,552	59.0	−1.7
Country Liberal	Jacob Nayinggul	1,078	41.0	+25.6
Total formal votes		2,630	93.3	
Informal votes		188	6.7	
Turnout		2,818	66.7	
Labor hold		Swing	−19.0	

=== Araluen ===
1997 Northern Territory general election: Araluen
Party	Candidate	Votes	%	±%
Country Liberal	Eric Poole	2,065	69.2	−0.9
Labor	Lilliah McCulloch	919	30.8	+0.9
Total formal votes		2,984	93.1	
Informal votes		223	6.9	
Turnout		3,207	84.1	
Country Liberal hold		Swing	−0.9	

=== Arnhem ===
1997 Northern Territory general election: Arnhem
Party	Candidate	Votes	%	±%
Labor	Jack Ah Kit	1,037	43.9	−30.6
Country Liberal	Alan Wright	841	35.6	+10.1
Independent	Lance Lawrence	277	11.7	+11.7
Greens	Thomas Maywundjiwuy	208	8.8	+8.8
Total formal votes		2,363	92.0	
Informal votes		207	8.0	
Turnout		2,570	62.8	
Two-party-preferred result
Labor	Jack Ah Kit	1,365	57.8	−16.7
Country Liberal	Alan Wright	998	42.2	+16.7
Labor hold		Swing	−16.7	

=== Barkly ===
1997 Northern Territory general election: Barkly
Party	Candidate	Votes	%	±%
Labor	Maggie Hickey	1,591	56.8	+11.3
Country Liberal	Mark John	1,118	39.9	−6.2
Independent	Barry Nattrass	93	3.3	+3.3
Total formal votes		2,802	94.8	
Informal votes		153	5.2	
Turnout		2,955	74.4	
Two-party-preferred result
Labor	Maggie Hickey	1,625	58.0	+6.0
Country Liberal	Mark John	1,177	42.0	−6.0
Labor hold		Swing	+6.0	

=== Blain ===
1997 Northern Territory general election: Blain
Party	Candidate	Votes	%	±%
Country Liberal	Barry Coulter	2,491	73.8	+14.7
Labor	Richard Bawden	884	26.2	−8.2
Total formal votes		3,375	92.9	
Informal votes		257	7.1	
Turnout		3,632	88.8	
Country Liberal hold		Swing	+11.8	

=== Braitling ===
1997 Northern Territory general election: Braitling
Party	Candidate	Votes	%	±%
Country Liberal	Loraine Braham	1,870	66.4	−4.5
Labor	Peter Brooke	947	33.6	+4.5
Total formal votes		2,817	93.1	
Informal votes		208	6.9	
Turnout		3,025	79.8	
Country Liberal hold		Swing	−4.5	

=== Brennan ===
1997 Northern Territory general election: Brennan
Party	Candidate	Votes	%	±%
Country Liberal	Denis Burke	2,747	74.3	+21.9
Labor	Stephen Bennett	950	25.7	−8.4
Total formal votes		3,697	94.3	−2.1
Informal votes		222	5.7	+2.1
Turnout		3,919	86.7	
Country Liberal hold		Swing	+13.3	

=== Casuarina ===
1997 Northern Territory general election: Casuarina
Party	Candidate	Votes	%	±%
Country Liberal	Peter Adamson	1,828	56.7	+1.3
Labor	Douglas McLeod	1,226	38.0	−6.6
Independent	Timothy Stewart	169	5.2	+5.2
Total formal votes		3,223	96.0	
Informal votes		134	4.0	
Turnout		3,357	82.1	
Two-party-preferred result
Country Liberal	Peter Adamson	1,866	57.9	+3.0
Labor	Douglas McLeod	1,357	42.1	−3.0
Country Liberal hold		Swing	+3.0	

=== Drysdale ===
1997 Northern Territory general election: Drysdale
Party	Candidate	Votes	%	±%
Country Liberal	Stephen Dunham	1,844	57.0	−3.1
Labor	Paul Nieuwenhoven	908	28.0	−11.9
Democrats	Stuart Edwards	484	14.9	+14.9
Total formal votes		3,236	95.5	
Informal votes		154	4.5	
Turnout		3,390	85.8	
Two-party-preferred result
Country Liberal	Sephen Dunham	2,048	63.3	+3.0
Labor	Paul Nieuwenhoven	1,188	36.7	−3.0
Country Liberal hold		Swing	+3.0	

=== Fannie Bay ===
1997 Northern Territory general election: Fannie Bay
Party	Candidate	Votes	%	±%
Labor	Clare Martin	1,782	53.0	+10.9
Country Liberal	Michael Kilgariff	1,582	47.0	−10.9
Total formal votes		3,364	95.7	
Informal votes		150	4.3	
Turnout		3,514	84.1	
Labor gain from Country Liberal		Swing	+10.9	

=== Goyder ===
1997 Northern Territory general election: Goyder
Party	Candidate	Votes	%	±%
Country Liberal	Terry McCarthy	1,845	59.4	+5.7
Labor	Wayne Connop	1,070	34.4	+3.0
Independent	Strider	191	6.1	+6.1
Total formal votes		3,106	95.9	−1.7
Informal votes		134	4.1	+1.7
Turnout		3,240	83.0	
Two-party-preferred result
Country Liberal	Terry McCarthy	1,915	61.7	+1.0
Labor	Wayne Connop	1,191	38.3	−1.0
Country Liberal hold		Swing	+1.0	

=== Greatorex ===
1997 Northern Territory general election: Greatorex
Party	Candidate	Votes	%	±%
Country Liberal	Richard Lim	1,853	60.5	+16.6
Labor	Peter Kavanagh	1,211	39.5	+10.1
Total formal votes		3,231	94.8	
Informal votes		167	5.2	
Turnout		3,398	89.7	
Country Liberal hold		Swing	−1.8	

=== Jingili ===
1997 Northern Territory general election: Jingili
Party	Candidate	Votes	%	±%
Country Liberal	Steve Balch	1,570	50.9	−3.4
Labor	Catherine Phillips	1,093	35.4	−10.3
Independent	Stephen Barnes	310	10.0	+10.0
Independent	Ross Forday	110	3.6	+3.6
Total formal votes		3,083	96.1	
Informal votes		124	3.9	
Turnout		3,207	84.4	
Two-party-preferred result
Country Liberal	Steve Balch	1,748	56.7	+2.7
Labor	Catherine Phillips	1,335	43.3	−2.7
Country Liberal hold		Swing	+2.7	

=== Karama ===
1997 Northern Territory general election: Karama
Party	Candidate	Votes	%	±%
Country Liberal	Mick Palmer	1,811	51.7	+0.9
Labor	John Tobin	1,692	48.3	+4.6
Total formal votes		3,503	95.8	
Informal votes		154	4.2	
Turnout		3,657	85.5	
Country Liberal hold		Swing	−1.3	

=== Katherine ===
1997 Northern Territory general election: Katherine
Party	Candidate	Votes	%	±%
Country Liberal	Mike Reed	1,984	69.6	−1.0
Labor	Michael Pierce	583	20.4	−9.0
Independent	Peter Byers	284	10.0	+10.0
Total formal votes		2,851	95.7	
Informal votes		122	4.3	
Turnout		2,973	74.5	
Two-party-preferred result
Country Liberal	Mike Reed	2,124	74.5	+4.4
Labor	Michael Pierce	727	25.5	−4.4
Country Liberal hold		Swing	+4.4	

=== MacDonnell ===
1997 Northern Territory general election: MacDonnell
Party	Candidate	Votes	%	±%
Country Liberal	John Elferink	945	36.1	+2.0
Labor	Mark Wheeler	906	34.6	−31.3
Independent	Kenneth Lechleitner	767	29.3	+29.3
Total formal votes		2,618	95.0	
Informal votes		137	5.0	
Turnout		2,755	63.6	
Two-party-preferred result
Country Liberal	John Elferink	1,383	52.8	+18.7
Labor	Mark Wheeler	1,235	47.2	−18.7
Country Liberal gain from Labor		Swing	+18.7	

=== Millner ===
1997 Northern Territory general election: Millner
Party	Candidate	Votes	%	±%
Country Liberal	Phil Mitchell	1,782	53.8	+6.8
Labor	Peter O'Hagan	1,133	34.2	−8.2
Greens	June Mills	212	6.4	+6.4
Independent	Ian Mills	187	5.6	+5.6
Total formal votes		3,314	94.8	
Informal votes		183	5.2	
Turnout		3,497	78.2	
Two-party-preferred result
Country Liberal	Phil Mitchell	1,945	58.7	+7.8
Labor	Peter O'Hagan	1,369	41.3	−7.8
Country Liberal hold		Swing	+7.8	

=== Nelson ===
1997 Northern Territory general election: Nelson
Party	Candidate	Votes	%	±%
Country Liberal	Chris Lugg	1,461	44.5	+0.8
Independent	Dave Tollner	1,174	35.8	+35.8
Labor	Theresa Francis	646	19.7	−5.0
Total formal votes		3,281	96.6	−1.3
Informal votes		116	3.4	+1.3
Turnout		3,397	87.8	
Notional two-party-preferred count
Country Liberal	Chris Lugg	2,122	64.7	+7.8
Labor	Theresa Francis	1,159	35.3	−7.8
Two-candidate-preferred result
Country Liberal	Chris Lugg	1,661	50.6	+3.7
Independent	Dave Tollner	1,620	49.4	+49.4
Country Liberal gain from Independent		Swing	+3.7	

=== Nhulunbuy ===
1997 Northern Territory general election: Nhulunbuy
Party	Candidate	Votes	%	±%
Labor	Syd Stirling	1,880	72.1	+17.5
Country Liberal	Richard Davey	728	27.9	−17.5
Total formal votes		2,608	93.9	
Informal votes		170	6.1	
Turnout		2,778	66.9	
Labor hold		Swing	+17.5	

=== Nightcliff ===
1997 Northern Territory general election: Nightcliff
Party	Candidate	Votes	%	±%
Country Liberal	Stephen Hatton	1,792	49.1	−7.2
Labor	Paul Henderson	1,411	38.7	+1.0
Independent	Betty McCleary	360	9.9	+9.9
Independent	Theo Katapodis	84	2.3	+2.3
Total formal votes		3,647	97.0	
Informal votes		114	3.0	
Turnout		3,761	87.3	
Two-party-preferred result
Country Liberal	Stephen Hatton	1,991	54.6	−4.4
Labor	Paul Henderson	1,656	45.4	+4.4
Country Liberal hold		Swing	−4.4	

=== Port Darwin ===
1997 Northern Territory general election: Port Darwin
Party	Candidate	Votes	%	±%
Country Liberal	Shane Stone	2,083	64.5	+4.3
Labor	Geoffrey Carter	827	25.6	−7.0
Independent	Lex Martin	321	9.9	+9.9
Total formal votes		3,231	95.5	
Informal votes		153	4.5	
Turnout		3,384	84.3	
Two-party-preferred result
Country Liberal	Shane Stone	2,164	67.0	+5.0
Labor	Geoffrey Carter	1,067	33.0	−5.0
Country Liberal hold		Swing	+5.0	

=== Sanderson ===
1997 Northern Territory general election: Sanderson
Party	Candidate	Votes	%	±%
Country Liberal	Daryl Manzie	1,992	59.3	+2.2
Labor	Michael Atkinson	1,369	40.7	−2.2
Total formal votes		3,361	94.5	
Informal votes		196	5.5	
Turnout		3,557	83.7	
Country Liberal hold		Swing	+2.2	

=== Stuart ===
1997 Northern Territory general election: Stuart
Party	Candidate	Votes	%	±%
Labor	Peter Toyne	1,190	51.5	−0.4
Country Liberal	John Bohning	1,120	48.5	+0.4
Total formal votes		2,310	93.8	
Informal votes		152	6.2	
Turnout		2,462	62.4	
Labor hold		Swing	−0.4	

=== Victoria River ===
1997 Northern Territory general election: Victoria River
Party	Candidate	Votes	%	±%
Country Liberal	Tim Baldwin	1,771	66.1	+15.4
Labor	Paul La Fontaine	909	33.9	−8.3
Total formal votes		2,680	93.3	
Informal votes		193	6.7	
Turnout		2,873	69.0	
Country Liberal hold		Swing	+12.1	

=== Wanguri ===
1997 Northern Territory general election: Wanguri
Party	Candidate	Votes	%	±%
Labor	John Bailey	1,649	52.0	+0.4
Country Liberal	Peter Styles	1,521	48.0	−0.4
Total formal votes		3,170	95.5	
Informal votes		150	4.5	
Turnout		3,320	85.1	
Labor hold		Swing	+0.4	

== See also ==
- 1997 Northern Territory general election
