= Electoral results for the division of MacDonnell =

This is a list of electoral results for the Electoral division of MacDonnell in Northern Territory elections.

== Members for MacDonnell ==
Member	Party	Term
Dave Pollock	Country Liberal	1974–1977
Neville Perkins	Labor	1977–1981
Neil Bell	Labor	1981–1997
John Elferink	Country Liberal	1997–2005
Alison Anderson	Labor	2005–2009
Alison Anderson	Independent	2009–2011
Alison Anderson	Country Liberal	2011–2012

== Election results ==
=== Elections in the 2000s ===
2008 Northern Territory general election: MacDonnell
Party	Candidate	Votes	%	±%
Labor	Alison Anderson	Unopposed		
Labor hold		Swing		

2005 Northern Territory general election: Macdonnell
Party	Candidate	Votes	%	±%
Labor	Alison Anderson	1,445	51.7	+10.2
Country Liberal	John Elferink	866	31.0	−27.5
Greens	Andrew Longmire	277	9.9	+9.9
Independent	Vincent Forrester	129	4.6	+4.6
Independent	David Chewings	77	2.8	+2.8
Total formal votes		2,794	92.2	−2.0
Informal votes		235	7.8	+2.0
Turnout		3,029	67.7	
Two-party-preferred result
Labor	Alison Anderson	1,727	61.8	+20.3
Country Liberal	John Elferink	1,067	38.2	−20.3
Labor gain from Country Liberal		Swing	+20.3	

2001 Northern Territory general election: MacDonnell
Party	Candidate	Votes	%	±%
Country Liberal	John Elferink	1,262	52.1	+19.9
Labor	Harold Furber	1,006	41.5	+1.5
Country Liberal	Philip Alice	156	6.4	+6.4
Total formal votes		2,424	94.2	−1.7
Informal votes		149	5.8	+1.7
Turnout		2,573	61.5	
Two-party-preferred result
Country Liberal	John Elferink	1,418	58.5	+10.1
Labor	Harold Furber	1,006	41.5	−10.1
Country Liberal notional gain from Labor		Swing	+10.1	

=== Elections in the 1990s ===
1997 Northern Territory general election: MacDonnell
Party	Candidate	Votes	%	±%
Country Liberal	John Elferink	945	36.1	+2.0
Labor	Mark Wheeler	906	34.6	−31.3
Independent	Kenneth Lechleitner	767	29.3	+29.3
Total formal votes		2,618	95.0	
Informal votes		137	5.0	
Turnout		2,755	63.6	
Two-party-preferred result
Country Liberal	John Elferink	1,383	52.8	+18.7
Labor	Mark Wheeler	1,235	47.2	−18.7
Country Liberal gain from Labor		Swing	+18.7	

1994 Northern Territory general election: MacDonnell
Party	Candidate	Votes	%	±%
Labor	Neil Bell	1,682	65.9	+12.7
Country Liberal	Pamela Waudby	870	34.1	+8.6
Total formal votes		2,552	96.5	
Informal votes		93	3.5	
Turnout		2,645	66.5	
Labor hold		Swing	+7.4	

1990 Northern Territory general election: MacDonnell
Party	Candidate	Votes	%	±%
Labor	Neil Bell	1,131	53.2	
Country Liberal	Brendan Heenan	542	25.5	
Country Liberal	Alison Hunt	453	21.3	
Total formal votes		2,126	94.8	
Informal votes		116	5.2	
Turnout		2,242	69.1	
Two-party-preferred result
Labor	Neil Bell	1,351	63.5	−1.8
Country Liberal	Brendan Heenan	775	36.5	+1.8
Labor hold		Swing	−1.8	

=== Elections in the 1980s ===
1987 Northern Territory general election: MacDonnell
Party	Candidate	Votes	%	±%
Labor	Neil Bell	1,116	72.6	+19.1
Country Liberal	J. Davis	315	20.5	−17.5
NT Nationals	Ron Liddle	106	6.9	+6.9
Total formal votes		1,537	94.7	
Informal votes		86	5.3	
Turnout		1,623	52.2	
Two-party-preferred result
Labor	Neil Bell	1,144	74.9	+15.9
Country Liberal	J. Davis	393	25.1	−15.9
Labor hold		Swing	+15.9	

1983 Northern Territory general election: Macdonnell
Party	Candidate	Votes	%	±%
Labor	Neil Bell	749	53.5	
Country Liberal	Ian McKinlay	532	38.0	
Democrats	Ted Hampton	118	8.4	
Total formal votes		1,399	95.0	
Informal votes		74	5.0	
Turnout		1,473	63.8	
Two-party-preferred result
Labor	Neil Bell	824	58.9	
Country Liberal	Ian McKinlay	575	41.1	
Labor hold		Swing		

1981 MacDonnell by-election
Party	Candidate	Votes	%	±%
Labor	Neil Bell	1,047	67.7	+10.1
Country Liberal	Rosalie Kunoth-Monks	499	32.3	−10.1
Total formal votes		1,546	95.6	−0.2
Informal votes		71	4.4	+0.2
Turnout		1,617	66.6	+5.6
Labor hold		Swing	+10.1	

1980 Northern Territory general election: MacDonnell
Party	Candidate	Votes	%	±%
Labor	Neville Perkins	817	57.6	−3.2
Country Liberal	Rosalie Kunoth-Monks	601	42.4	+9.1
Total formal votes		1,418	95.8	
Informal votes		62	4.2	
Turnout		1,480	61.0	
Labor hold		Swing	N/A	

=== Elections in the 1970s ===
1977 Northern Territory general election: MacDonnell
Party	Candidate	Votes	%	±%
Labor	Neville Perkins	886	60.8	
Country Liberal	Dave Pollock	485	33.3	
Progress	Mark Fidler	86	5.9	
Total formal votes		1,457	95.7	
Informal votes		65	4.3	
Turnout		1,522	61.2	
Labor gain from Country Liberal		Swing		

- Preferences were not distributed.

1974 Northern Territory general election: MacDonnell
Party	Candidate	Votes	%	±%
Country Liberal	Dave Pollock	535	53.4	
Labor	Malcolm Wolf	395	39.4	
Independent	Bruce Beaden	72	7.2	
Total formal votes		1,002	92.7	
Informal votes		79	7.3	
Turnout		1,081	65.2	
Country Liberal win		(new seat)		

- Preferences were not distributed.
