= Electoral results for the division of Victoria River =

This is a list of electoral results for the Electoral division of Victoria River in Northern Territory elections.

== Members for Victoria River ==
Member	Party	Term
Goff Letts	Country Liberal	1974–1977
Jack Doolan	Labor	1977–1983
Terry McCarthy	Country Liberal	1983–1990
Gary Cartwright	Labor	1990–1994
Tim Baldwin	Country Liberal	1994–2001

== Election results ==
=== Elections in the 1970s ===
1974 Northern Territory general election: Victoria River
Party	Candidate	Votes	%	±%
Country Liberal	Goff Letts	717	69.7	
Independent	Wiyendji Nunggula; Charles Renfrey	312	30.3	
Total formal votes		1,029	94.4	
Informal votes		61	5.6	
Turnout		1,090	62.6	
Country Liberal win		(new seat)		

- Preferences were not distributed.
- The number of votes each individual Independent received is unknown.

1977 Northern Territory general election: Victoria River
Party	Candidate	Votes	%	±%
Labor	Jack Doolan	690	50.0	+50.0
Country Liberal	Goff Letts	589	42.7	–27.0
Progress	Frank Favaro	100	7.3	+7.3
Total formal votes		1,379	95.8	+1.4
Informal votes		61	4.2	–1.4
Turnout		1,440	67.7	–5.1
Labor gain from Country Liberal		Swing	+50.0	

- Preferences were not distributed.

=== Elections in the 1980s ===
1980 Northern Territory general election: Victoria River
Party	Candidate	Votes	%	±%
Labor	Jack Doolan	872	52.6	+2.6
Country Liberal	John Millhouse	606	36.6	−6.1
Independent	Bronte Douglass	98	5.9	+5.9
Independent	Jack McCarthy	82	5.0	+5.0
Total formal votes		1,658	94.8	
Informal votes		91	5.2	
Turnout		1,749	72.6	
Labor hold		Swing	N/A	

- Preferences were not distributed.

1983 Northern Territory general election: Victoria River
Party	Candidate	Votes	%	±%
Country Liberal	Terry McCarthy	615	38.1	N/A
Labor	Dennis Bree	425	26.3	–26.3
Country Liberal	Ronald Wright	326	20.2	N/A
Democrats	Maurie Ryan	155	9.6	+9.6
Independent Labor	Jack Doolan	95	5.9	+5.9
Total formal votes		1,616	92.8	
Informal votes		125	7.2	
Turnout		1,741	75.8	
Two-party-preferred result
Country Liberal	Terry McCarthy	1,053	65.2	+28.6
Labor	Dennis Bree	563	34.9	–17.7
Country Liberal gain from Independent Labor		Swing	+28.6	

1987 Northern Territory general election: Victoria River
Party	Candidate	Votes	%	±%
Country Liberal	Terry McCarthy	936	58.4	+0.1
Labor	Leon White	466	29.1	+2.8
NT Nationals	Ronald Wright	130	8.1	+8.1
Independent	Lance Lawrence	71	4.4	+4.4
Total formal votes		1,603	94.9	
Informal votes		86	5.1	
Turnout		1,689	65.2	
Two-party-preferred result
Country Liberal	Terry McCarthy	1,072	66.9	+2.9
Labor	Leon White	531	33.1	−2.9
Country Liberal hold		Swing	+2.9	

=== Elections in the 1990s ===
1990 Northern Territory general election: Victoria River
Party	Candidate	Votes	%	±%
Labor	Gary Cartwright	1,252	51.5	+11.0
Country Liberal	Stephen Dunham	1,181	48.5	−11.0
Total formal votes		2,433	97.0	
Informal votes		74	3.0	
Turnout		2,507	73.6	
Labor gain from Country Liberal		Swing	+11.5	

1994 Northern Territory general election: Victoria River
Party	Candidate	Votes	%	±%
Country Liberal	Tim Baldwin	1,380	50.8	+2.3
Labor	Gary Cartwright	1,148	42.2	−9.3
Independent	John Noble	191	7.0	+7.0
Total formal votes		2,719	95.9	
Informal votes		116	4.1	
Turnout		2,835	73.0	
Two-party-preferred result
Country Liberal	Tim Baldwin	1,480	54.4	+5.9
Labor	Gary Cartwright	1,239	45.6	−5.9
Country Liberal gain from Labor		Swing	+5.9	

1997 Northern Territory general election: Victoria River
Party	Candidate	Votes	%	±%
Country Liberal	Tim Baldwin	1,771	66.1	+15.4
Labor	Paul La Fontaine	909	33.9	−8.3
Total formal votes		2,680	93.3	
Informal votes		193	6.7	
Turnout		2,873	69.0	
Country Liberal hold		Swing	+12.1	
