= Electoral results for the division of Braitling =

This is a list of electoral results for the electoral division of Braitling in Northern Territory elections.

== Members for Braitling ==
Member	Party	Term
Roger Vale	Country Liberal	1983–1994
Loraine Braham	Country Liberal	1994–2001
Loraine Braham	Independent	2001–2008
Adam Giles	Country Liberal	2008–2016
Dale Wakefield	Labor	2016–2020
Joshua Burgoyne	Country Liberal	2020–present

== Election results ==
=== Elections in the 1980s ===
1983 Northern Territory general election: Braitling
Party	Candidate	Votes	%	±%
Country Liberal	Roger Vale	1,325	77.8	N/A
Labor	Ross Kerridge	377	22.2	N/A
Total formal votes		1,702	97.0	N/A
Informal votes		52	3.0	N/A
Turnout		1,754	79.5	N/A
Country Liberal hold		Swing		

1987 Northern Territory general election: Braitling
Party	Candidate	Votes	%	±%
Country Liberal	Roger Vale	969	63.5	−14.3
Labor	Mike Alsop	307	20.1	−2.1
NT Nationals	Max Stewart	249	16.3	+16.3
Total formal votes		1,525	96.8	N/A
Informal votes		51	3.2	N/A
Turnout		1,576	64.4	N/A
Two-party-preferred result
Country Liberal	Roger Vale	1,152	75.5	−2.5
Labor	Mike Alsop	373	25.5	+2.5
Country Liberal hold		Swing	−2.5	

=== Elections in the 1990s ===
1990 Northern Territory general election: Braitling
Party	Candidate	Votes	%	±%
Country Liberal	Roger Vale	1,556	60.9	−2.6
Labor	Matthew Storey	473	18.5	−1.6
Independent	Leslie Oldfield	390	15.3	+15.3
NT Nationals	Damien Ward	138	5.4	−10.9
Total formal votes		2,557	97.8	N/A
Informal votes		59	2.2	N/A
Turnout		2,616	82.6	N/A
Two-party-preferred result
Country Liberal	Roger Vale	1,948	76.2	+3.5
Labor	Matthew Storey	609	23.8	−3.5
Country Liberal hold		Swing	+3.5	

1994 Northern Territory general election: Braitling
Party	Candidate	Votes	%	±%
Country Liberal	Loraine Braham	2,183	71.0	+10.1
Labor	Charles Carter	894	29.0	+10.5
Total formal votes		3,077	96.1	N/A
Informal votes		126	3.9	N/A
Turnout		3,203	82.4	N/A
Country Liberal hold		Swing	+2.4	

1997 Northern Territory general election: Braitling
Party	Candidate	Votes	%	±%
Country Liberal	Loraine Braham	1,870	66.4	−4.5
Labor	Peter Brooke	947	33.6	+4.5
Total formal votes		2,817	93.1	N/A
Informal votes		208	6.9	N/A
Turnout		3,025	79.8	N/A
Country Liberal hold		Swing	−4.5	

=== Elections in the 2000s ===
2001 Northern Territory general election: Braitling
Party	Candidate	Votes	%	±%
Country Liberal	Peter Harvey	1,422	39.6	−25.4
Independent	Loraine Braham	1,219	34.0	+34.0
Labor	Peter Brooke	797	22.2	−12.8
Independent	Eddie Taylor	122	3.4	+3.4
Independent	Peter Jarvis	28	0.8	+0.8
Total formal votes		3,588	96.6	N/A
Informal votes		127	3.4	N/A
Turnout		3,715	85.9	N/A
Two-party-preferred result
Country Liberal	Peter Harvey	2,075	57.8	−7.2
Labor	Peter Brooke	1,513	42.2	+7.2
Two-candidate-preferred result
Independent	Loraine Braham	1,990	55.5	+55.5
Country Liberal	Peter Harvey	1,598	44.5	−20.5
Member changed to Independent from Country Liberal		Swing	N/A	

2005 Northern Territory general election: Braitling
Party	Candidate	Votes	%	±%
Country Liberal	Michael Jones	1,613	45.7	+6.1
Independent	Loraine Braham	1,140	32.3	−1.7
Labor	Sue West	779	22.1	−0.2
Total formal votes		3,532	97.3	N/A
Informal votes		97	2.7	N/A
Turnout		3,629	84.0	N/A
Two-party-preferred result
Country Liberal	Michael Jones	2,063	58.4	+0.6
Labor	Sue West	1,469	41.6	−0.6
Two-candidate-preferred result
Independent	Loraine Braham	1,797	50.9	−4.6
Country Liberal	Michael Jones	1,735	49.1	+4.6
Independent hold		Swing	−4.6	

2008 Northern Territory general election: Braitling
Party	Candidate	Votes	%	±%
Country Liberal	Adam Giles	2,052	58.2	+12.8
Greens	Jane Clark	526	14.9	+14.9
Independent	Eli Melky	496	14.1	+14.1
Labor	Aaron Dick	449	12.7	−10.0
Total formal votes		3,523	97.2	N/A
Informal votes		103	2.8	N/A
Turnout		3,626	73.3	N/A
Two-party-preferred result
Country Liberal	Adam Giles	2,588	73.5	+15.4
Labor	Aaron Dick	935	26.5	−15.4
Two-candidate-preferred result
Country Liberal	Adam Giles	2,475	70.3	+12.2
Greens	Jane Clark	1,048	29.7	+29.7
Country Liberal gain from Independent		Swing	+12.2	

=== Elections in the 2010s ===
2012 Northern Territory general election: Braitling
Party	Candidate	Votes	%	±%
Country Liberal	Adam Giles	2,372	67.6	+9.3
Labor	Deborah Rock	613	17.5	+4.7
Greens	Barbara Shaw	321	9.1	−5.8
Independent	Colin Furphy	204	5.8	+5.8
Total formal votes		3,510	97.6	N/A
Informal votes		88	2.4	N/A
Turnout		3,598	76.8	N/A
Two-party-preferred result
Country Liberal	Adam Giles	2,585	73.6	+0.2
Labor	Deborah Rock	925	26.4	−0.2
Country Liberal hold		Swing	+0.2	

2016 Northern Territory general election: Braitling
Party	Candidate	Votes	%	±%
Country Liberal	Adam Giles	2,091	42.8	−20.0
Labor	Dale Wakefield	1,601	32.8	+14.3
Greens	Dalton Dupuy	493	10.1	+0.8
Independent	Phil Walcott	332	6.8	+6.8
Independent	Eli Melky	211	4.3	+4.3
Independent	Jane Clark	125	2.6	+2.6
Independent	Alfred Gould	36	0.7	+0.7
Total formal votes		4,889	98.3	N/A
Informal votes		84	1.7	N/A
Turnout		4,973	82.9	N/A
Two-party-preferred result
Labor	Dale Wakefield	2,314	50.3	+19.9
Country Liberal	Adam Giles	2,287	49.7	−19.9
Labor gain from Country Liberal		Swing	+19.9	

=== Elections in the 2020s ===
2020 Northern Territory general election: Braitling
Party	Candidate	Votes	%	±%
Country Liberal	Joshua Burgoyne	1,548	35.2	−4.3
Labor	Dale Wakefield	993	22.6	−11.2
Independent	Kim Hopper	648	14.7	+14.7
Territory Alliance	Dale McIver	488	11.1	+11.1
Greens	Chris Tomlins	379	8.6	−2.3
Independent	Scott McConnell	199	4.5	+4.5
Federation	Marli Banks	140	3.2	+3.2
Total formal votes		4,395	97.0	N/A
Informal votes		137	3.0	N/A
Turnout		4,532	77.7	N/A
Two-party-preferred result
Country Liberal	Joshua Burgoyne	2,256	51.3	+4.3
Labor	Dale Wakefield	2,139	48.7	−4.3
Country Liberal gain from Labor		Swing	+4.3	

2024 Northern Territory general election: Braitling
Party	Candidate	Votes	%	±%
Country Liberal	Joshua Burgoyne	2,101	50.0	+14.8
Greens	Asta Hill	1,627	38.8	+30.1
Labor	Allison Bitar	469	11.2	−11.4
Total formal votes		4,198	97.4	−0.5
Informal votes		111	2.6	−0.5
Turnout		4,309	70.4	
Two-party-preferred result (Note: Estimated two-party-preferred count by Antony Green.)
Country Liberal	Joshua Burgoyne	2,445	58.2	+7.0
Labor	Allison Bitar	1,753	41.8	−7.0
Two-candidate-preferred result
Country Liberal	Joshua Burgoyne	2,261	53.9	+2.5
Greens	Asta Hill	1,937	46.1	+46.1
Country Liberal hold		Swing	+2.6	
