= Electoral results for the division of Drysdale =

This is a list of electoral results for the Electoral division of Drysdale in Northern Territory elections.

== Members for Drysdale ==
Member	Party	Term
Stephen Dunham	Country Liberal	1997–2005
Chris Natt	Labor	2005–2008
Ross Bohlin	Country Liberal	2008–2012
Ross Bohlin	Independent	2012–2012
Lia Finocchiaro	Country Liberal	2012–2016
Eva Lawler	Labor	2016–2024
Clinton Howe	Country Liberal	2024-present

== Election results ==
=== Elections in the 1990s ===
1997 Northern Territory general election: Drysdale
Party	Candidate	Votes	%	±%
Country Liberal	Stephen Dunham	1,844	57.0	−3.1
Labor	Paul Nieuwenhoven	908	28.0	−11.9
Democrats	Stuart Edwards	484	14.9	+14.9
Total formal votes		3,236	95.5	N/A
Informal votes		154	4.5	N/A
Turnout		3,390	85.8	N/A
Two-party-preferred result
Country Liberal	Stephen Dunham	2,048	63.3	+3.0
Labor	Paul Nieuwenhoven	1,188	36.7	−3.0
Country Liberal hold		Swing	+3.0	

=== Elections in the 2000s ===
2001 Northern Territory general election: Drysdale
Party	Candidate	Votes	%	±%
Country Liberal	Stephen Dunham	2,265	65.4	−3.8
Labor	Inger Peirce	1,199	34.6	+10.5
Total formal votes		3,464	94.2	N/A
Informal votes		213	5.8	N/A
Turnout		3,677	83.9	N/A
Country Liberal hold		Swing	−6.4	

2005 Northern Territory general election: Drysdale
Party	Candidate	Votes	%	±%
Labor	Chris Natt	1,829	51.3	+17.4
Country Liberal	Stephen Dunham	1,739	48.7	−16.6
Total formal votes		3,568	95.3	N/A
Informal votes		177	4.7	N/A
Turnout		3,745	82.1	N/A
Labor gain from Country Liberal		Swing	+17.0	

2008 Northern Territory general election: Drysdale
Party	Candidate	Votes	%	±%
Country Liberal	Ross Bohlin	2,020	55.3	+6.3
Labor	Chris Natt	1,262	34.5	−12.8
Independent	Justin Tutty	374	10.2	+10.2
Total formal votes		3,656	96.4	N/A
Informal votes		135	3.6	N/A
Turnout		3,791	79.9	N/A
Two-party-preferred result
Country Liberal	Ross Bohlin	2,199	60.1	+9.7
Labor	Chris Natt	1,457	39.9	−9.7
Country Liberal gain from Labor		Swing	+9.7	

=== Elections in the 2010s ===
2012 Northern Territory general election: Drysdale
Party	Candidate	Votes	%	±%
Country Liberal	Lia Finocchiaro	2,336	56.5	+1.2
Labor	James Burke	1,142	27.6	−6.9
Independent	Ross Bohlin	657	15.9	+15.9
Total formal votes		4,135	96.8	N/A
Informal votes		137	3.2	N/A
Turnout		4,272	82.5	N/A
Two-party-preferred result
Country Liberal	Lia Finocchiaro	2,699	65.3	+5.1
Labor	James Burke	1,436	34.7	−5.1
Country Liberal hold		Swing	+5.1	

2016 Northern Territory general election: Drysdale
Party	Candidate	Votes	%	±%
Labor	Eva Lawler	1,593	41.0	+9.1
Country Liberal	Ben Hosking	1,341	34.5	−20.3
Independent	Lyle Mackay	395	10.2	+10.2
Greens	Hayden Bray	250	6.4	+6.4
1 Territory	David Cartwright	165	4.2	+4.2
Independent	Margy Kerle	141	3.6	+3.6
Total formal votes		3,885	97.2	N/A
Informal votes		111	2.8	N/A
Turnout		3,996	73.2	N/A
Two-party-preferred result
Labor	Eva Lawler	1,964	55.2	+16.6
Country Liberal	Ben Hosking	1,597	44.8	−16.6
Labor gain from Country Liberal		Swing	+16.6	

=== Elections in the 2020s ===
2020 Northern Territory general election: Drysdale
Party	Candidate	Votes	%	±%
Labor	Eva Lawler	1,648	42.2	+1.2
Country Liberal	Leanne Butler	1,023	26.2	−8.3
Territory Alliance	Fiona Lynch	533	13.6	+13.6
Ban Fracking Fix Crime Protect Water	Lash Lisson	226	5.8	+5.8
Independent	Danielle Eveleigh	211	5.4	+5.4
Independent	Raj Samson	179	4.6	+4.6
Independent	Brendan Killalea	85	2.2	+2.2
Total formal votes		3,905	95.0	N/A
Informal votes		204	5.0	N/A
Turnout		4,109	70.5	N/A
Two-party-preferred result
Labor	Eva Lawler	2,263	58.0	+2.7
Country Liberal	Leanne Butler	1,642	42.0	−2.7
Labor hold		Swing	+2.7	

2024 Northern Territory general election: Drysdale
Party	Candidate	Votes	%	±%
Country Liberal	Clinton Howe	2,466	58.7	+28.4
Labor	Eva Lawler	1,254	29.8	−12.1
Independent	Cindy Mebbingarri Roberts	484	11.5	+11.5
Total formal votes		4,204	96.4	
Informal votes		156	3.6	
Turnout		4,360	68.7	
Two-party-preferred result
Country Liberal	Clinton Howe	2,732	65.0	+20.4
Labor	Eva Lawler	1,472	35.0	−20.4
Country Liberal gain from Labor		Swing	+20.4	
