= Electoral results for the division of Jingili =

This is a list of electoral results for the Electoral division of Jingili in Northern Territory elections.

== Members for Jingili ==
Member	Party	Term
Paul Everingham	Country Liberal	1974–1984
Rick Setter	Country Liberal	1984–1997
Steve Balch	Country Liberal	1997–2001

== Election results ==
=== Elections in the 1970s ===
1974 Northern Territory general election: Jingili
Party	Candidate	Votes	%	±%
Country Liberal	Paul Everingham	928	51.8	N/A
Labor	Thomas Bell	863	48.2	N/A
Total formal votes		1,791	94.1	N/A
Informal votes		112	5.9	N/A
Turnout		1,903	82.9	N/A
Country Liberal win		(new seat)		

1977 Northern Territory general election: Jingili
Party	Candidate	Votes	%	±%
Labor	Diana Rickard	662	36.4	−11.8
Country Liberal	Paul Everingham	639	35.1	−16.7
Progress	David Cooper	338	18.6	+18.6
Independent	John McCormack; George Tarasidis	182	10.0	+10.0
Total formal votes		1,821	97.2	N/A
Informal votes		52	2.8	N/A
Turnout		1,873	83.8	N/A
Two-party-preferred result
Country Liberal	Paul Everingham	972	53.4	+1.6
Labor	Diana Rickard	849	46.6	−1.6
Country Liberal hold		Swing		

=== Elections in the 1980s ===
1980 Northern Territory general election: Jingili
Party	Candidate	Votes	%	±%
Country Liberal	Paul Everingham	1,555	60.7	+25.6
Labor	Peter Hansen	858	33.5	−7.7
Democrats	Peter Read	151	5.9	+5.9
Total formal votes		2,564	98.2	N/A
Informal votes		47	1.8	N/A
Turnout		2,611	82.2	N/A
Country Liberal hold		Swing	N/A	

- Preferences were not distributed.

1983 Northern Territory general election: Jingili
Party	Candidate	Votes	%	±%
Country Liberal	Paul Everingham	1,577	71.8	+11.1
Labor	Martin Jacob	619	28.2	−5.3
Total formal votes		2,196	98.5	N/A
Informal votes		33	1.5	N/A
Turnout		2,229	89.1	N/A
Country Liberal hold		Swing		

1984 Jingili by-election
Party	Candidate	Votes	%	±%
Country Liberal	Rick Setter	1,059	54.9	−16.9
Labor	Barry Cavanagh	869	45.1	+16.9
Total formal votes		1,928	96.8	−1.7
Informal votes		64	3.2	+1.7
Turnout		1,992	76.0	−13.1
Country Liberal hold		Swing	−16.9	

1987 Northern Territory general election: Jingili
Party	Candidate	Votes	%	±%
Country Liberal	Rick Setter	1,108	44.5	−27.3
Labor	Bob Wharton	936	37.6	+9.4
NT Nationals	Harry Maschke	444	17.9	+17.9
Total formal votes		2,488	96.5	N/A
Informal votes		89	3.5	N/A
Turnout		2,577	80.8	N/A
Two-party-preferred result
Country Liberal	Rick Setter	1,429	57.4	−11.6
Labor	Bob Wharton	1,059	42.6	+11.6
Country Liberal hold		Swing	+11.6	

=== Elections in the 1990s ===
1990 Northern Territory general election: Jingili
Party	Candidate	Votes	%	±%
Country Liberal	Rick Setter	1,731	58.6	+14.1
Labor	Fiona Stuchbery	1,040	35.2	−2.4
Greens	Penelope Thomson	182	6.2	+6.2
Total formal votes		2,953	97.1	N/A
Informal votes		89	2.9	N/A
Turnout		3,042	86.5	N/A
Two-party-preferred result
Country Liberal	Rick Setter	1,749	59.2	+2.6
Labor	Fiona Stuchbery	1,204	40.8	−2.6
Country Liberal hold		Swing	+2.6	

1994 Northern Territory general election: Jingili
Party	Candidate	Votes	%	±%
Country Liberal	Rick Setter	1,745	54.3	−4.3
Labor	Ted Warren	1,467	45.7	+10.5
Total formal votes		3,212	94.8	N/A
Informal votes		175	5.2	N/A
Turnout		3,387	86.0	N/A
Country Liberal hold		Swing	−4.9	

1997 Northern Territory general election: Jingili
Party	Candidate	Votes	%	±%
Country Liberal	Steve Balch	1,570	50.9	−3.4
Labor	Catherine Phillips	1,093	35.4	−10.3
Independent	Stephen Barnes	310	10.0	+10.0
Independent	Ross Forday	110	3.6	+3.6
Total formal votes		3,083	96.1	N/A
Informal votes		124	3.9	N/A
Turnout		3,207	84.4	N/A
Two-party-preferred result
Country Liberal	Steve Balch	1,748	56.7	+2.7
Labor	Catherine Phillips	1,335	43.3	−2.7
Country Liberal hold		Swing	+2.7	
