= Speaker of the Northern Territory Legislative Assembly =

Speaker of the Legislative Assembly
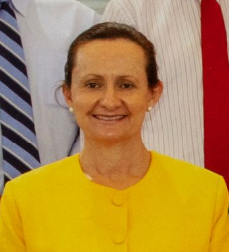
- Incumbent; Robyn Lambley since 15 October 2024
- Style: The Honourable
- Appointer: Elected by the Northern Territory Legislative Assembly
- Inaugural holder: Bernie Kilgariff
- Formation: 20 November 1974
- Website: http://www.nt.gov.au/lant/about-parliament/speaker.shtml

The Speaker of the Northern Territory Legislative Assembly is the presiding officer in the Northern Territory Legislative Assembly. Though the office had existed since the creation of the Assembly in 1974, it was given greater legislative force when the roles and functions of the office were included in the federal Act that gave the Territory self-government in 1978.

The Speaker's principal duty is to preside over the Assembly. The occupant of the Chair must maintain order in the House, uphold the Standing Orders (rules of procedure) and protect the rights of backbench members.

The Speaker must be a member of the Assembly themselves and is elected to the position by a ballot of the members of the Assembly. It is generally a partisan position, although the speakership has been held by independents on occasion.

The current speaker is Araluen MLA Robyn Lambley, an independent.

== Speakers of the Northern Territory Legislative Assembly ==
No.	Speaker	Took office	Left office	Tenure	Party	Assembly	Election
1	Bernie Kilgariff (1923–2010); MLA for Alice Springs	20 November 1974	16 July 1975 (Note: Kilgariff resigned to contest a seat in the Australian Senate.)	238 days	Country Liberal	1st	1974
2	Les MacFarlane (1919–1986); MLA for Elsey	17 July 1975	27 February 1984	8 years, 225 days	Country Liberal	1st	–
2	Les MacFarlane (1919–1986); MLA for Elsey	17 July 1975	27 February 1984	8 years, 225 days	Country Liberal	2nd	1977
2	Les MacFarlane (1919–1986); MLA for Elsey	17 July 1975	27 February 1984	8 years, 225 days	Country Liberal	3rd	1980
3	Roger Steele (born 1939); MLA for Elsey	28 February 1984	16 June 1986	2 years, 108 days	Country Liberal	4th	1983
4	Roger Vale (1942–2001); MLA for Braitling	17 June 1986	9 October 1989	3 years, 114 days	Country Liberal	4th	–
4	Roger Vale (1942–2001); MLA for Braitling	17 June 1986	9 October 1989	3 years, 114 days	Country Liberal	5th	1987
5	Nick Dondas (1939–2024); MLA for Casuarina	10 October 1989	26 June 1994	4 years, 259 days	Country Liberal	5th	–
5	Nick Dondas (1939–2024); MLA for Casuarina	10 October 1989	26 June 1994	4 years, 259 days	Country Liberal	6th	1990
6	Terry McCarthy (born 1940); MLA for Goyder; 1st time	27 June 1994	24 November 1997	3 years, 150 days	Country Liberal	7th	1994
7	Loraine Braham (1938–2026); MLA for Braitling; 1st time	25 November 1997	15 February 1999	1 year, 82 days	Country Liberal	8th	1997
–	Terry McCarthy (born 1940); MLA for Goyder; 2nd time	16 February 1999	15 October 2001	2 years, 241 days	Country Liberal	8th	–
–	Loraine Braham (1938–2026); MLA for Braitling; 2nd time	16 October 2001	28 June 2005	3 years, 255 days	Independent	9th	2001
8	Jane Aagaard (born 1956); MLA for Nightcliff	29 June 2005	22 October 2012	7 years, 115 days	Labor	10th	2005
8	Jane Aagaard (born 1956); MLA for Nightcliff	29 June 2005	22 October 2012	7 years, 115 days	Labor	11th	2008
9	Kezia Purick (born 1958); MLA for Goyder	23 October 2012	20 July 2015	7 years, 244 days	Country Liberal	12th	2012
9	Kezia Purick (born 1958); MLA for Goyder	20 July 2015	23 June 2020	7 years, 244 days	Independent	13th	2016
10	Chansey Paech (born 1987); MLA for Gwoja	23 June 2020	7 September 2020	76 days	Labor	14th	2020
11	Ngaree Ah Kit (born 1981); MLA for Karama	20 October 2020	23 May 2022	1 year, 215 days	Labor	14th	–
12	Mark Monaghan (born TBA); MLA for Fong Lim	23 May 2022	12 February 2024	1 year, 265 days	Labor	14th	–
13	Dheran Young (born TBA); MLA for Daly	13 February 2024	15 October 2024	245 days	Labor	14th	–
14	Robyn Lambley (born 1965); MLA for Araluen	15 October 2024	Incumbent	1 year, 328 days	Independent	15th	2024

== Timeline ==
The following is a graphical lifespan timeline of speakers of the Northern Territory Legislative Assembly, listed in order of first assuming the office.
