= Members of the Northern Territory Legislative Assembly, 1994–1997 =

This is a list of members of the Northern Territory Legislative Assembly from 1994 to 1997.

Name	Party	Electorate	Years in office
Peter Adamson	CLP	Casuarina	1994–2001
Jack Ah Kit ^{[2]}	ALP	Arnhem	1995–2005
John Bailey	ALP	Wanguri	1989–1999
Tim Baldwin	CLP	Victoria River	1994–2005
Neil Bell	ALP	MacDonnell	1981–1997
Loraine Braham	CLP	Braitling	1994–2008
Hon Denis Burke	CLP	Brennan	1994–2005
Hon Barry Coulter	CLP	Palmerston	1983–1999
Brian Ede ^{[3]}	ALP	Stuart	1983–1996
Hon Fred Finch	CLP	Leanyer	1983–1997
Hon Stephen Hatton	CLP	Nightcliff	1983–2001
Maggie Hickey	ALP	Barkly	1990–2001
Wes Lanhupuy ^{[2]}	ALP	Arnhem	1983–1995
Dr Richard Lim	CLP	Greatorex	1994–2007
Hon Daryl Manzie	CLP	Sanderson	1983–2001
Clare Martin ^{[1]}	ALP	Fannie Bay	1995–2008
Hon Terry McCarthy	CLP	Goyder	1983–2001
Phil Mitchell	CLP	Millner	1994–2001
Noel Padgham-Purich	Independent	Nelson	1977–1997
Mick Palmer	CLP	Karama	1983–2001
Hon Marshall Perron ^{[1]}	CLP	Fannie Bay	1974–1995
Hon Eric Poole	CLP	Araluen	1986–2001
Hon Mike Reed	CLP	Katherine	1987–2003
Maurice Rioli	ALP	Arafura	1992–2001
Rick Setter	CLP	Jingili	1984–1997
Syd Stirling	ALP	Nhulunbuy	1990–2008
Hon Shane Stone	CLP	Port Darwin	1990–2000
Peter Toyne ^{[3]}	ALP	Stuart	1996–2006

^{1} Fannie Bay CLP MLA Marshall Perron resigned on 29 May 1995. ALP candidate Clare Martin won the resulting by-election on 17 June.
^{2} Arnhem ALP MLA Wes Lanhupuy resigned on 25 August 1995. ALP candidate Jack Ah Kit won the resulting by-election on 7 October.
^{3} Stuart ALP MLA Brian Ede resigned on 23 August 1996. ALP candidate Peter Toyne won the resulting by-election on 28 September.

== See also ==
- 1994 Northern Territory general election
