= 1981 MacDonnell by-election =

- 28 March 1981

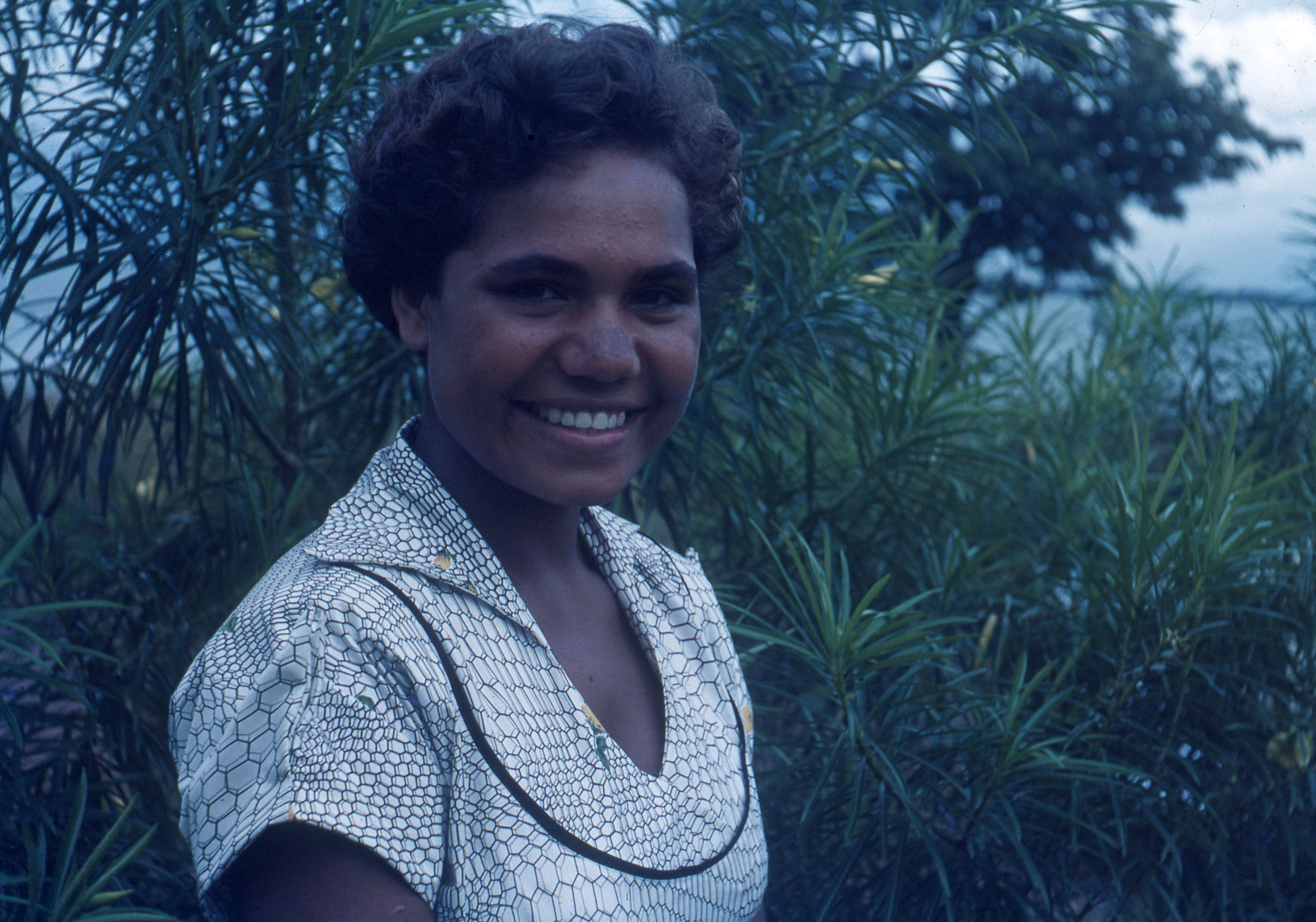
	First party	Second party
Candidate	Neil Bell	Rosalie Kunoth-Monks
Party	Labor	Country Liberal
Popular vote	1,047	499
Percentage	67.7%	32.3%
Swing	▲10.1	▼10.1
MP before election
Neville Perkins
Labor
Elected MP
Neil Bell
Labor

A by-election for the seat of MacDonnell in the Northern Territory Legislative Assembly was held on 28 March 1981. The by-election was triggered by the resignation of Labor Party member Neville Perkins, the first indigenous person in Australia to hold a shadow ministry in an Australian parliament. The seat had been held by Perkins since 1977.

The CLP selected Aboriginal film activist Rosalie Kunoth-Monks, as its candidate. The Labor candidate was Neil Bell.

== Results ==
MacDonnell by-election, 1981
Party	Candidate	Votes	%	±%
Labor	Neil Bell	1,047	67.7	+10.1
Country Liberal	Rosalie Kunoth-Monks	499	32.3	−10.1
Total formal votes		1,546	95.6	−0.2
Informal votes		71	4.4	+0.2
Turnout		1,617	66.6	+5.6
Labor hold		Swing	+10.1	
