= Dale Wakefield =

Australian politician

The Honourable Dale Wakefield

Member of the Northern Territory Legislative Assembly for Braitling
- In office 27 August 2016 – 22 August 2020
- Preceded by: Adam Giles
- Succeeded by: Joshua Burgoyne

Personal details
- Born: Dale Suzanne Wakefield Melbourne, Victoria, Australia
- Party: Labor Party
- Occupation: Social worker

Dale Suzanne Wakefield is an Australian politician. She was a Labor member of the Northern Territory Legislative Assembly from 2016 to 2020, representing the electorate of Braitling, defeating former Chief Minister Adam Giles in a major upset.

== Early life and career ==
Wakefield was born in Melbourne. She obtained a degree in social work from Latrobe and Monash University.

After working in road trauma rehabilitation, Wakefield moved to Alice Springs in 2004. She has been a member of the Alice Springs Health Governing Council and was chairwoman and board member of Central Australian Women's Legal Service. Before entering politics, she ran the Alice Springs Women's Shelter for eight years.

She was a NT finalist for the 2015 Telstra Business Women Awards.

== Politics ==
Wakefield stood against Chief Minister Adam Giles in the 2016 election, in the south Alice Springs seat of Braitling. Going into the election, Braitling was the fourth-safest seat in the Territory; Wakefield needed a 19.6 percent swing to win it. Like Alice Springs as a whole, Braitling had long been considered Country Liberal Party (CLP) heartland; it had only been out of the party's hands for two terms since its creation in 1984, when CLP-turned-independent Loraine Braham held it 2001 to 2008. Labor had never won an inner Alice Springs seat before (though it held at least one remote-based seat that spilled into Alice Springs from 1983 to 2012), and had never come particularly close to winning Braitling. For example, even during the CLP's near-meltdown in 2005, Labor was pushed into third place behind Braham and the CLP.

Northern Territory Legislative Assembly
Years	Term	Electoral division	Party
2016–2020	13th	Braitling	Labor

However, amid the massive Labor wave that swept through the Territory on election night, Wakefield was ahead of Giles as counting began. Preliminary returns had Giles on 49.9 percent to Wakefield's 50.1 percent—a lead that increased as returns came in during the week after the election. This was mainly because Giles lost 20 percent of his primary vote from 2012. While he was still 10 points ahead of Wakefield on the first count, Wakefield narrowly pulled ahead on preferences. By 2 September, Wakefield led Giles by 23 votes—well within the threshold for a recount under Territory election law. The recount took place on 5 September, and confirmed that Wakefield was still leading on a knife-edge. When the final result was announced, Wakefield won the seat with a margin of 27 votes on a swing of 19.9 percent. This made Wakefield just the second challenger to oust a sitting Majority Leader/Chief Minister in their own seat, and the third to unseat a major-party leader in the Territory. She is also the first Labor member to represent an inner Alice Springs seat.

Soon after her victory was confirmed, Wakefield was named to Cabinet as Minister for Territory Families.

Despite a redistribution making Braitling slightly friendlier to Labor, the 2020 Northern Territory election saw Wakefield defeated by CLP challenger Joshua Burgoyne with a swing of 4 points.

Northern Territory Legislative Assembly
Preceded by Adam Giles	Member for Braitling; 2016–2020	Succeeded by Joshua Burgoyne
Political offices
Preceded by New ministry	Minister for Territory Families; 2016–present	Incumbent
