= 1984 Jingili by-election =

- 15 December 1984
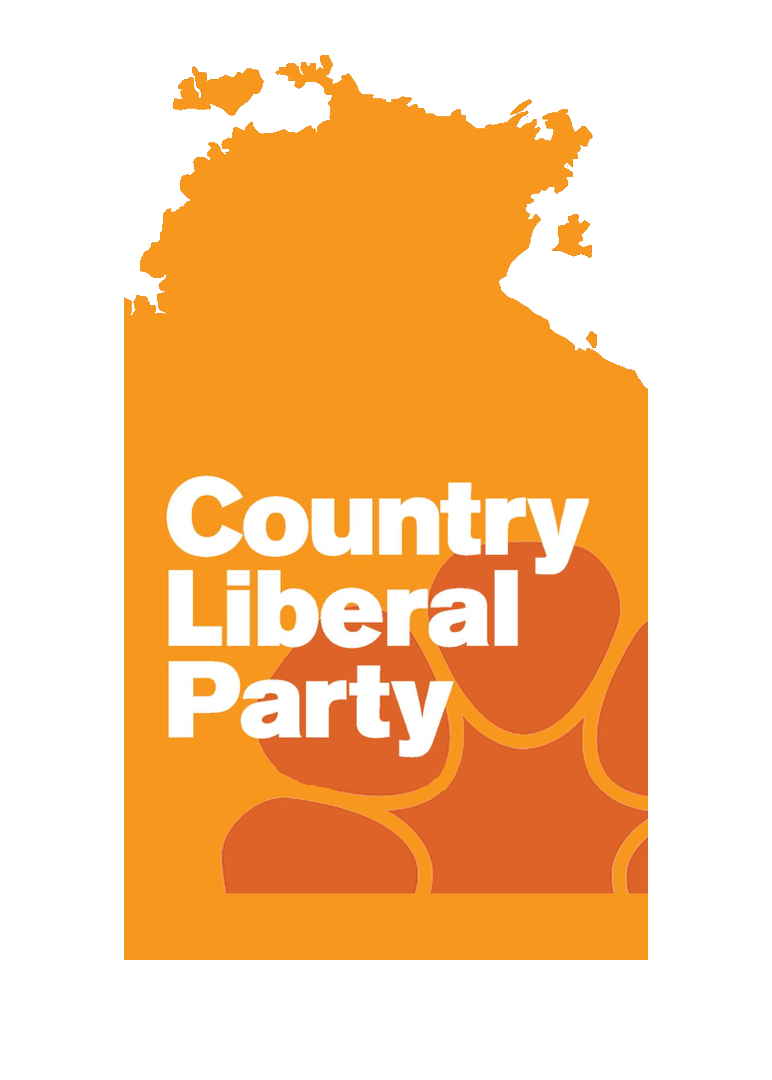

	First party	Second party
Candidate	Rick Setter	Barry Cavanagh
Party	Country Liberal	Labor
Popular vote	1,059	869
Percentage	54.9%	45.1%
Swing	▼16.9	▲16.9
MP before election
Paul Everingham
Country Liberal
Elected MP
Rick Setter
Country Liberal

A by-election for the seat of Jingili in the Northern Territory Legislative Assembly was held on 15 December 1984. The by-election was triggered by the resignation of CLP Chief Minister Paul Everingham to seek election to the Federal House of Representatives. The seat of Jingili had been held by Everingham since its creation in 1974.

== Results ==
Jingili by-election, 1984
Party	Candidate	Votes	%	±%
Country Liberal	Rick Setter	1,059	54.9	−16.9
Labor	Barry Cavanagh	869	45.1	+16.9
Total formal votes		1,928	96.8	−1.7
Informal votes		64	3.2	+1.7
Turnout		1,992	76.0	−13.1
Country Liberal hold		Swing	−16.9	
