= Joshua Burgoyne =

Australian politician (born 1989)

Joshua Burgoyne MLA

Member of the Northern Territory Legislative Assembly for Braitling
- Incumbent
- Assumed office 22 August 2020
- Preceded by: Dale Wakefield

Personal details
- Born: 17 October 1989 (age 36) Alice Springs
- Party: Country Liberal Party
- Education: St Philips College
- Occupation: Electrician

Joshua Roland Burgoyne (born 17 October 1989) is an Australian politician who is the member for Braitling in the Northern Territory Legislative Assembly.

Northern Territory Legislative Assembly
Years	Term	Electoral division	Party
2020–present	14th	Braitling	Country Liberal

Burgoyne was born and raised in Alice Springs, and was elected to parliament for the Country Liberal Party at the 2020 Northern Territory election. At the time he was the youngest member of the Assembly.

Burgoyne previously ran for the Senate at the 2019 Australian federal election as the number two candidate on the CLP ticket but was unsuccessful.
