= Jack Doolan (politician) =

Australian politician (1927–1995)

John Kevin Raphael "Jack" Doolan (14 June 1927 – 29 January 1995) was an Australian politician. He was the Labor member for Victoria River in the Northern Territory Legislative Assembly from 1977 to 1983. He is best known for having toppled Majority Leader Goff Letts in the 1977 election—one of the few times that a major-party leader in Australia has been defeated in his own electorate. Doolan was re-elected in 1980, but had been removed from the Labor caucus by the 1983 election and recontested and lost as an Independent Labor candidate.

Northern Territory Legislative Assembly
Years	Term	Electoral division	Party
1977–1980	2nd	Victoria River	Labor
1980–1983	3rd	Victoria River	Labor

Prior to his election, Doolan worked as a patrol officer with the Australian Government Department of Aboriginal Affairs.

Northern Territory Legislative Assembly
Preceded by Goff Letts	Member for Victoria River; 1977–1983	Succeeded by Terry McCarthy
