= Chris Natt =

Australian politician

Personal information
- Born: 9 December 1952 (age 73)
- Height: 193 cm (6 ft 4 in)
- Weight: 93 kg (205 lb)
- Position: Ruckman

Playing career^{1}
Years	Club	Games (Goals)
1972–1983	Port Adelaide (SANFL)	216 (85)
- ^{1} Playing statistics correct to the end of 1983.

Career highlights
- 2× SANFL premiership player (1980, 1981)

Christopher William Natt (born 9 December 1952) is a former Australian politician and Australian rules footballer who played for the Port Adelaide Football Club in the South Australian National Football League (SANFL).

== Football career ==
A ruckman, Natt played 216 games for Port Adelaide between 1972 and 1983. He won two premierships with Port Adelaide in 1980 and 1981.

Following his retirement from football, Natt coached local teams in South Australia before moving to the Northern Territory to take up the position of chief executive officer of the Northern Territory Football League.

== Politics ==
Northern Territory Legislative Assembly
Years	Term	Electoral division	Party
2005–2008	10th	Drysdale	Labor

In 2005, Natt ran for the Northern Territory Legislative Assembly as the Labor Party candidate in the Palmerston electorate of Drysdale at the 2005 Territory election. He faced extremely daunting odds on paper. Palmerston had long been reckoned as a Country Liberal Party stronghold; Labor had never won a Palmerston-based seat in the history of the Legislative Assembly. The sitting CLP member, Stephen Dunham, held it with a majority of 15.7 percent, making it the CLP's third-safest seat. However, in a result that no one even anticipated, Natt defeated Dunham after recording a two-party swing of 17.5% towards him. Even more surprisingly, Natt won enough votes on the first count to take the seat off the CLP without the need for preferences. Following his election, Natt was immediately named to the cabinet as Minister for Mines and Energy.

A redistribution ahead of the 2008 Northern Territory election wiped out Natt's majority, making Drysdale a notional CLP seat. In that election, Drysdale reverted to form as Natt was heavily defeated by CLP challenger Ross Bohlin.

== Personal life ==
Natt's brother Greg also played football for Port Adelaide.

Northern Territory Legislative Assembly
Preceded by Stephen Dunham	Member for Drysdale; 2005 – 2008	Succeeded by Ross Bohlin
