= Ross Bohlin =

Australian politician

Member of the Northern Territory Legislative Assembly for Drysdale
- In office 9 August 2008 – 24 August 2012
- Preceded by: Chris Natt
- Succeeded by: Lia Finocchiaro

Personal details
- Born: Adelaide, South Australia
- Party: Country Liberal Party (2008–2012)
- Other political affiliations: Independent (from July 2012)
- Occupation: Police officer

Ross Oscar Charles Bohlin is a former Australian politician. He was a Country Liberal Party member of the Northern Territory Legislative Assembly, and held his seat of Drysdale from his defeat of sitting Labor member Chris Natt at the 2008 election until 2012.

Northern Territory Legislative Assembly
Years	Term	Electoral division	Party
2008–2012	11th	Drysdale	Country Liberal

Bohlin was born in Adelaide, South Australia, and served in the Australian Army. He moved to the Northern Territory in the 1990s, and joined the Northern Territory Police in 1998.

Ross was not re-endorsed by his own party to stand in the 2012 Northern Territory general election. This has been gossip within the CLP since May 2011, after he angered several of his colleagues by publicly supporting the distribution of condoms at a Darwin music festival. Nonetheless, he was surprised when he lost his preselection. CLP Party President Sue Fraser-Adams, was quoted in a newspaper article that "politics doesn't suit him, it's a lot harder than it looks" she went on to say that it was a safe seat for the party. Bohlin announced that he would run as an independent candidate in July.

Northern Territory Legislative Assembly
Preceded by Chris Natt	Member for Drysdale; 2008–2012	Succeeded by Lia Finocchiaro
