= Dave Pollock =

Australian politician

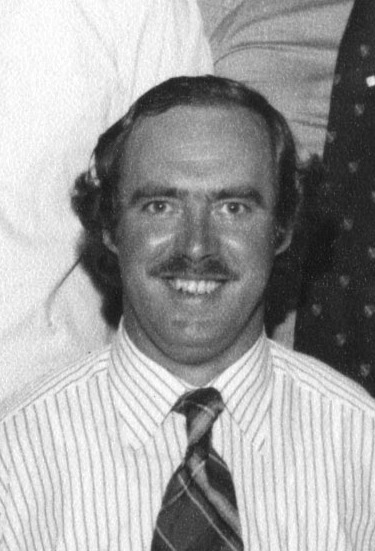
Pollock in 1976

Northern Territory Legislative Assembly
Years	Term	Electoral division	Party
1974–1977	1st	MacDonnell	Country Liberal

David Lloyd Pollock (born 17 November 1942) is a former Australian politician. He was the Country Liberal Party member for MacDonnell in the Northern Territory Legislative Assembly from 1974 to 1977.

Northern Territory Legislative Assembly
Preceded by New seat	Member for MacDonnell; 1974–1977	Succeeded by Neville Perkins
