= Clinton Howe =

Australian politician

Member of the Northern Territory Legislative Assembly for Drysdale
- Incumbent
- Assumed office 24 August 2024
- Preceded by: Eva Lawler

Personal details
- Party: Country Liberal

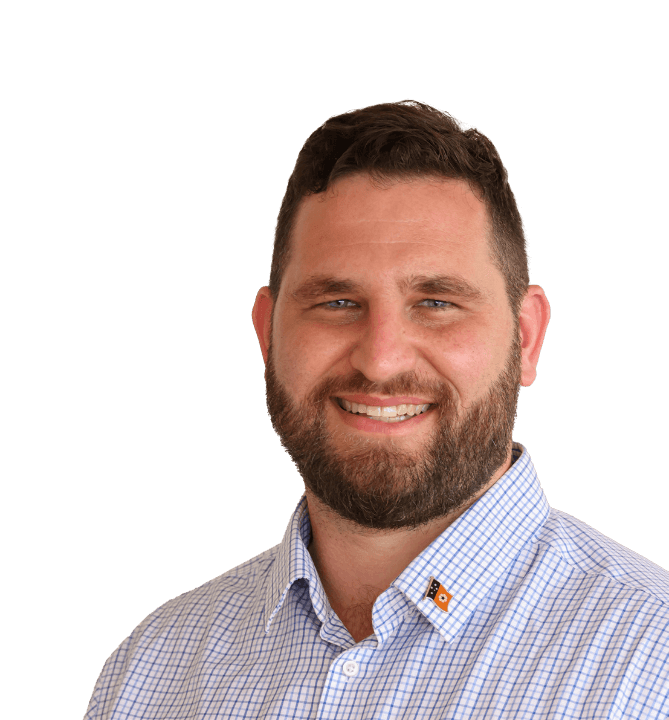
Clinton Howe MLA

Clinton Howe is an Australian politician from the Country Liberal Party.

In the 2024 Northern Territory general election, he defeated Labor Chief Minister of the Northern Territory Eva Lawler in Drysdale. He was the third challenger to oust the Northern Territory's head of government in their own seat, and the fourth challenger to defeat a major-party leader in their own seat. Amid a heavy swing to the CLP in Darwin and Palmerston, Howe defeated Lawler with 65.2 percent of the primary vote on a swing of over 21 percent, enough to turn the downtown Palmerston seat into a safe CLP seat in one stroke. He actually won 59.5 percent of the primary vote, enough to take the seat off Labor without the need for preferences.

Mr Howe said it was a fitting matchup.

“I’m a product of her failings. If she hadn’t failed the community, I wouldn’t be here,” he said.

"Prior to doing this, I really just saw myself as a dad, a business owner, and someone who wanted to raise his family and employ a good team of people.".

Howe formerly served in the 1st Armoured Regiment in Darwin and was the welfare officer for the Australian Army in the Northern Territory.

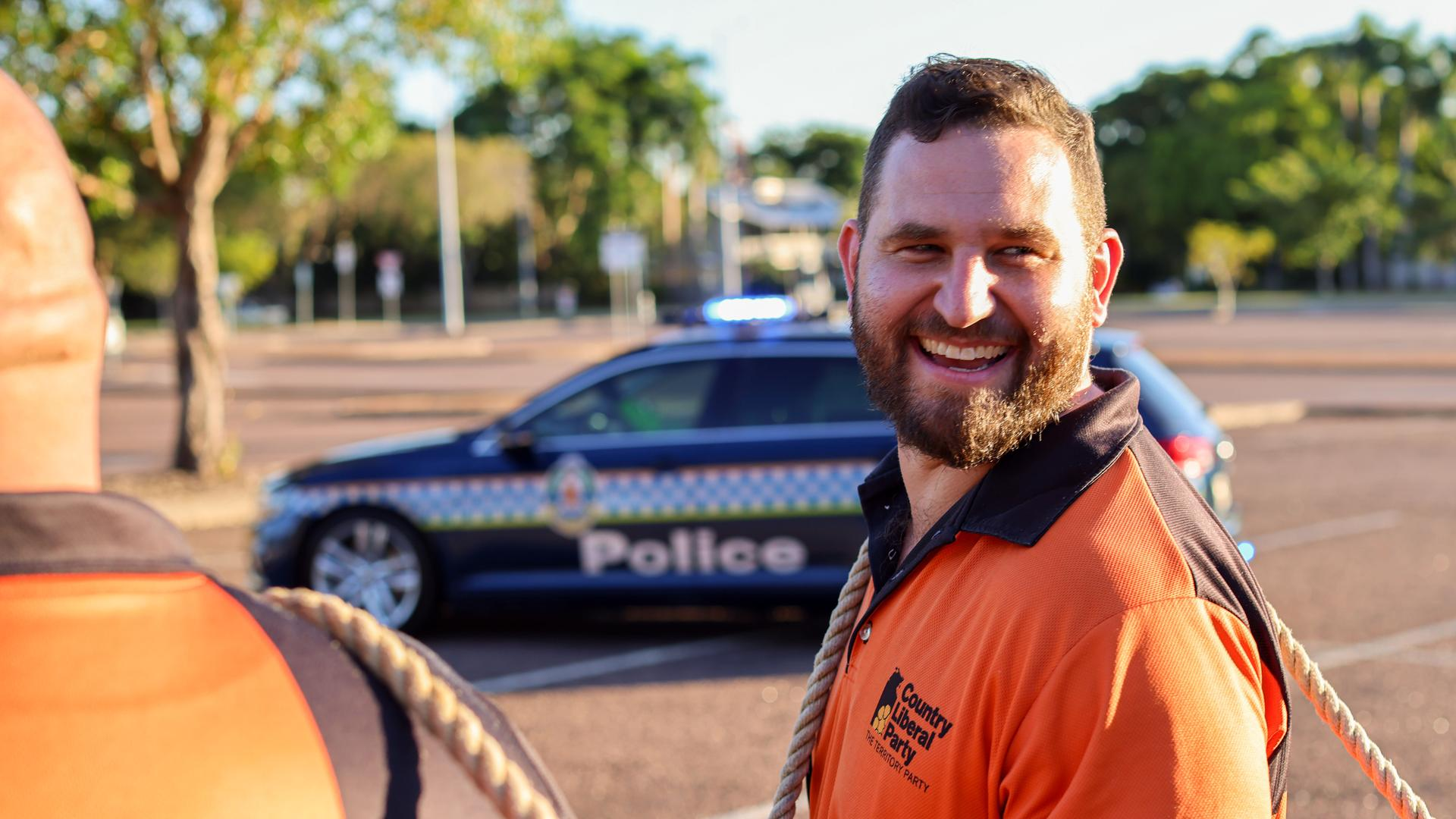
Clinton Howe MLA - A Night for Digger

Northern Territory Legislative Assembly
Preceded by Eva Lawler	Member for Drysdale; 2024–present	Incumbent
