= Electoral division of Drysdale =

Coordinates: 12.485085°S 130.973005°E

Drysdale Northern Territory—Legislative Assembly
- Interactive map of boundaries as of the 2024 election
- Territory: Northern Territory
- Created: 1997
- MP: Clinton Howe
- Party: Country Liberal
- Namesake: Fred Drysdale
- Electors: 6,476 (2026)
- Area: 5 km^{2} (1.9 sq mi)
- Demographic: Urban
Electorates around Drysdale:
Nelson	Spillett	Spillett
Nelson	Drysdale	Spillett
Blain	Blain	Brennan

Drysdale is an electoral division of the Legislative Assembly in Australia's Northern Territory. It was first created in 1997, and is named after Fred Drysdale, a former member of the Legislative Council. It is an urban electorate covering 5 km^{2} in north-western Palmerston including the CBD and the suburbs of Driver, Gray, Yarrawonga and most of Moulden. There were 6,476 people enrolled within the electorate as of July 2026.

== History ==
Palmerston had long been considered a conservative stronghold, and for the first eight years of its life, Drysdale was considered to be a safe seat for the Country Liberal Party. CLP candidate Stephen Dunham easily won the seat at the 1997 election and easily retained it at the 2001 election.

Most commentators predicted that the CLP's dominance in Drysdale would continue at the 2005 election, although the Labor Party were running a high-profile candidate, former AFL Northern Territory general manager Chris Natt. However, there was a significant swing to the ALP across the territory on election day, and Dunham was ultimately defeated, along with several other CLP sitting members. The final result took several days to be decided, but ultimately Natt won the seat on a swing of 17.5 percent. Even more surprisingly, he won enough primary votes to take the seat without the need for preferences. However, before the 2008 election, a redistribution erased Natt's majority and made Drysdale a notional CLP seat. Ross Bohlin regained the seat for the CLP on a large swing, but lost his preselection in 2012 and contested the election as an independent candidate. He was defeated by the CLP's endorsed candidate, Lia Finocchiaro.

After a redistribution transferred much of Finocchiaro's base to the new seat of Spillett, Finocchiaro opted to transfer to Spillett even though Drysdale was still a safe CLP seat on paper. However, at the 2016 election, the CLP's primary vote plunged by over 20 percent amid the party's near-total meltdown in Palmerston. Eva Lawler took the seat for Labor on a swing of over 16 percent, becoming only the second Labor member ever to win it. She then increased her majority at the 2020 election, becoming the first Labor MLA to retain a Palmerston seat.

Lawler became Chief Minister in late 2023. However, at the 2024 Territory election, Lawler was routed in her own seat by the CLP's Clinton Howe amid Labor's meltdown in Darwin and Palmerston. Howe reclaimed the seat for the CLP on a swing of over 20 percent, enough to revert Drysdale to its traditional status as a safe CLP seat. He actually won an outright majority on the primary vote, enough to take the seat off Labor without the need for preferences.

== Members for Drysdale ==
Image	Member	Party	Term	Notes
	Stephen Dunham (1956–)	Country Liberal	30 August 1997 – 18 May 2005	Served as a minister under Burke. Lost seat
	Chris Natt (1952–)	Labor	18 May 2005 – 9 August 2008	Lost seat
	Ross Bohlin	Country Liberal	9 August 2008 – 12 July 2012	Resigned from CLP after losing preselection. Lost seat
	Ross Bohlin	Independent	12 July 2012 – 25 August 2012	Resigned from CLP after losing preselection. Lost seat
	Lia Finocchiaro (1984–)	Country Liberal	25 August 2012 – 27 August 2016	Served as a minister under Mills. Moved to Spillett in 2016. CLP leader since 2020 and Chief Minister since 2024
	Eva Lawler (1962–)	Labor	27 August 2016 – 24 August 2024 –	Served as a minister under Gunner and Fyles. Labor leader and Chief Minister from 2023 until 2024. Lost seat
	Clinton Howe	Country Liberal	24 August 2024 – present	Incumbent

== Election results ==
2024 Northern Territory general election: Drysdale
Party	Candidate	Votes	%	±%
Country Liberal	Clinton Howe	2,466	58.7	+28.4
Labor	Eva Lawler	1,254	29.8	−12.1
Independent	Cindy Mebbingarri Roberts	484	11.5	+11.5
Total formal votes		4,204	96.4	
Informal votes		156	3.6	
Turnout		4,360	68.7	
Two-party-preferred result
Country Liberal	Clinton Howe	2,732	65.0	+20.4
Labor	Eva Lawler	1,472	35.0	−20.4
Country Liberal gain from Labor		Swing	+20.4	
