= Neil Bell (politician) =

Australian politician

Northern Territory Legislative Assembly
| Years | Term | Electoral division | Party |
|---|---|---|---|
| 1981–1983 | 3rd | MacDonnell | Labor |
| 1983–1987 | 4th | MacDonnell | Labor |
| 1987–1990 | 5th | MacDonnell | Labor |
| 1990–1994 | 6th | MacDonnell | Labor |
| 1994–1997 | 7th | MacDonnell | Labor |

Neil Randal Bell (born 5 October 1947) is an Australian former politician. He was the Labor member for MacDonnell in the Northern Territory Legislative Assembly from 1981 to 1997. A teacher before entering politics, Bell organised opposition to Chief Minister Marshall Perron's bill to legalise euthanasia in 1995.

Northern Territory Legislative Assembly
| Preceded by Neville Perkins | Member for MacDonnell; 1981–1997 | Succeeded by John Elferink |
