= 1994 Northern Territory general election =

- 4 June 1994

All 25 seats of the Northern Territory Legislative Assembly 13 seats needed for a majority
- Turnout: 80.7 (▼0.9 pp)
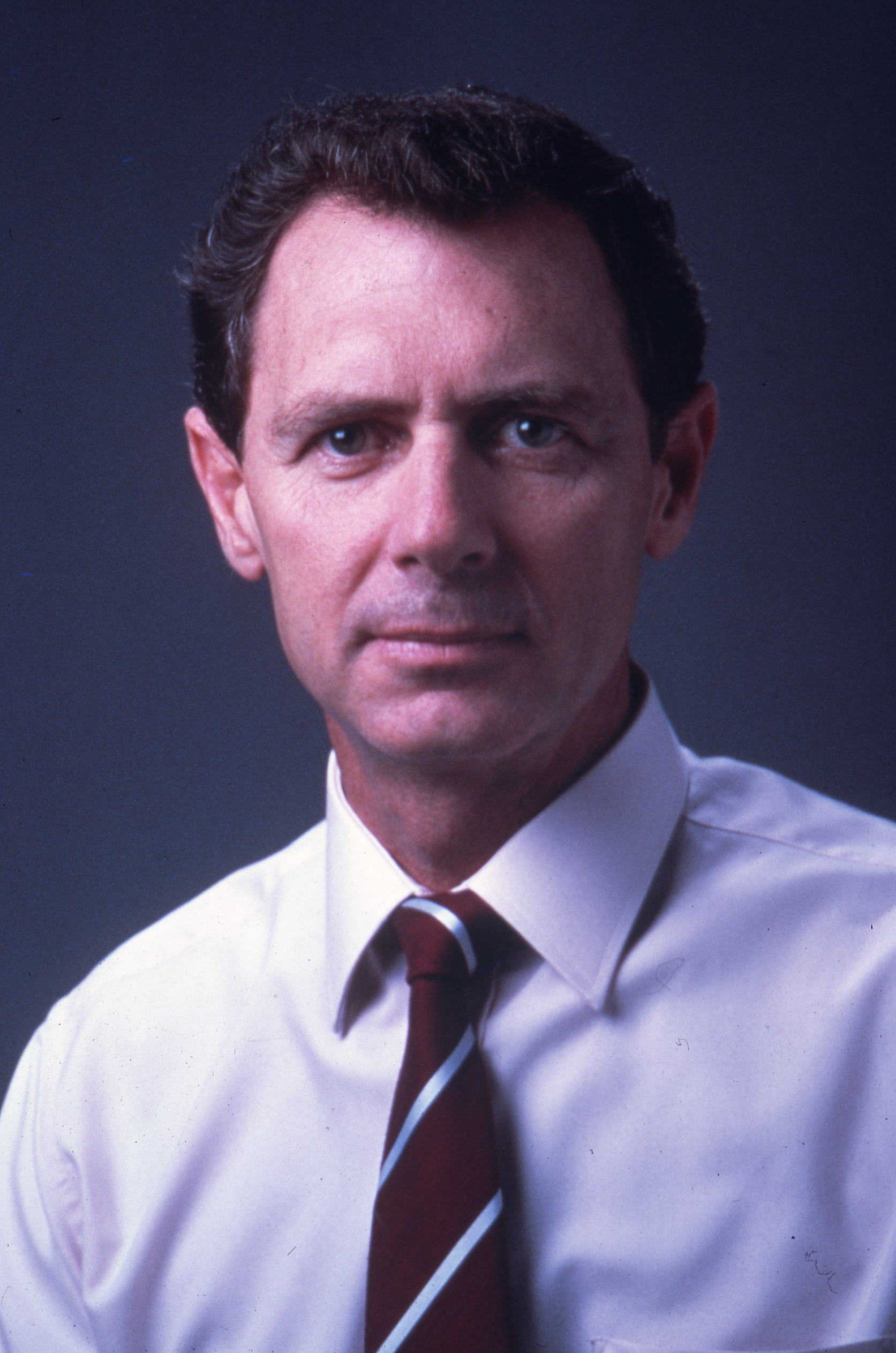

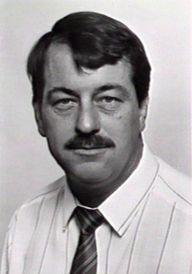
	First party	Second party
Leader	Marshall Perron	Brian Ede
Party	Country Liberal	Labor
Leader since	14 July 1988	2 November 1990
Leader's seat	Fannie Bay	Stuart
Last election	14 seats	9 seats
Seats won	17	7
Seat change	▲3	▼2
Popular vote	38,266	30,507
Percentage	51.9%	41.4%
Swing	▲3.1	▲4.8
TPP	56.3%	43.7%
TPP	▼0.7	▲0.7
Chief Minister before election
Marshall Perron
Country Liberal
Elected Chief Minister
Marshall Perron
Country Liberal

A general election was held in the Northern Territory on Saturday 4 June 1994, and was won by the incumbent Country Liberal Party (CLP). Marshall Perron continued as Chief Minister.

Independent Noel Padgham-Purich retained her seat of Nelson while Independent Denis Collins lost his seat of Greatorex to the CLP.

== Retiring MPs ==
=== Country Liberal ===
- Nick Dondas MLA (Casuarina)
- Roger Vale MLA (Braitling)

== Results ==
↓
17	1	7
CLP	Ind	Labor

Summary of the results of the 1994 Northern Territory general election, Legislative Assembly
Party	Votes	%	+/–	Seats	+/–
Country Liberal	38,266	51.91	▲3.08	17	+3
Labor	30,507	41.38	▲4.74	7	-2
Independents	4,338	5.88	▼0.90	1	-1
Greens	552	0.75	▼2.30	0	±0
Democrats	58	0.08	New	0	±0
Total	73,721	100.00	–	25	–
Valid votes	73,721	96.19			
Invalid/blank votes	2,917	3.81	+0.7		
Total votes	76,638	100.00	–		
Registered voters/turnout	95,007	80.67	-0.9		
Country Liberal	41,485	56.27			
Labor	32,236	43.73			
Total	73,721	100.00			

Popular vote
Country Liberal	51.91%
Labor	41.38%
Others	0.83%
Independents	5.88%

Two-party-preferred vote
Country Liberal	56.30%
Labor	43.70%

Seats
Country Liberal	68.00%
Labor	28.00%
Independents	4.00%

== Candidates ==
Sitting members are listed in bold. Successful candidates are highlighted in the relevant colour.

Electorate	Held by	Labor	CLP	Other
Arafura	Labor	**Maurice Rioli**	Lothar Siebert	Colin Newton (Ind)
Araluen	CLP	Mescal Yates	**Eric Poole**	
Arnhem	Labor	**Wes Lanhupuy**	Veronica Januschka	
Barkly	Labor	**Maggie Hickey**	Paul Ruger	Geoffrey Freeman (Ind)
Braitling	CLP	Charles Carter	Loraine Braham	
Brennan	CLP	Geoffrey Carter	Denis Burke	**Max Ortmann** (Ind)
Casuarina	CLP	Clare Martin	Peter Adamson	
Fannie Bay	CLP	Sue Bradley	**Marshall Perron**	
Goyder	CLP	Jamie Johnson	**Terry McCarthy**	Gerry Wood (Ind)
Greatorex	Independent	Kerrie Nelson	Richard Lim	**Denis Collins** (Ind)
Jingili	CLP	Ted Warren	**Rick Setter**	
Karama	CLP	John Tobin	**Mick Palmer**	Christopher Inskip (Ind); Goncalo Pinto (Dem)
Katherine	CLP	Gabriela Maynard	**Mike Reed**	
Leanyer	CLP	Cossimo Russo	**Fred Finch**	
MacDonnell	Labor	**Neil Bell**	Pamela Waudby	
Millner	Labor	**Ken Parish**	Phil Mitchell	Ilana Eldridge (Grn)
Nelson	Independent	Wayne Connop	Chris Lugg	**Noel Padgham-Purich** (Ind)
Nhulunbuy	Labor	**Syd Stirling**	Michael O'Shea	
Nightcliff	CLP	Paul Henderson	**Stephen Hatton**	Robert Adams (Dem)
Palmerston	CLP	Kevin Diflo	**Barry Coulter**	David Elliott (Ind)
Port Darwin	CLP	Rodney Haritos	**Shane Stone**	Andrea Jones (Grn)
Sanderson	CLP	Denise Horvath	**Daryl Manzie**	
Stuart	Labor	**Brian Ede**	John Bohning	
Victoria River	Labor	**Gary Cartwright (politician)**	Tim Baldwin	John Noble (Ind)
Wanguri	Labor	**John Bailey**	Steve Balch	

== Seats changing hands ==
Seat	Pre-1994			Swing	Post-1994		
Seat	Party	Member	Margin	Swing	Margin	Member	Party
Greatorex	Independent	Denis Collins	2.5	14.8	12.3	Richard Lim	Country Liberal
Millner	Labor	Ken Parish	6.7	7.9	1.2	Phil Mitchell	Country Liberal
Victoria River	Labor	Gary Cartwright (politician)	1.5	5.9	4.4	Tim Baldwin	Country Liberal

== Post-election pendulum ==
The following pendulum is known as the Mackerras pendulum, invented by psephologist Malcolm Mackerras. The pendulum works by lining up all of the seats held in the Legislative Assembly according to the percentage point margin they are held by on a two-party-preferred basis. This is also known as the swing required for the seat to change hands. Given a uniform swing to the opposition or government parties, the number of seats that change hands can be predicted.

Country Liberal seats
Marginal
Millner	Phil Mitchell	CLP	1.2
Jingili	Rick Setter	CLP	4.3
Karama	Mick Palmer	CLP	4.3
Victoria River	Tim Baldwin	CLP	4.4
Casuarina	Peter Adamson	CLP	5.4
Fairly safe
Fannie Bay	Marshall Perron	CLP	7.9
Sanderson	Daryl Manzie	CLP	7.1
Nightcliff	Stephen Hatton	CLP	9.6
Safe
Leanyer	Fred Finch	CLP	10.1
Brennan	Denis Burke	CLP	11.9
Greatorex	Richard Lim	CLP	12.3
Port Darwin	Shane Stone	CLP	12.7
Palmerston	Barry Coulter	CLP	12.9
Goyder	Terry McCarthy	CLP	15.8
Very safe
Araluen	Eric Poole	CLP	20.1
Katherine	Mike Reed	CLP	20.6
Braitling	Loraine Braham	CLP	21.0

Labor seats
Marginal
Barkly	Maggie Hickey	ALP	1.6
Wanguri	John Bailey	ALP	1.6
Stuart	Brian Ede	ALP	1.8
Nhulunbuy	Syd Stirling	ALP	4.6
Fairly safe
Safe
Arafura	Maurice Rioli	ALP	15.3
Macdonnell	Neil Bell	ALP	15.9
Very safe
Arnhem	Wes Lanhupuy	ALP	24.5
Independent seats
Nelson	Noel Padgham-Purich	IND	3.1 v CLP
