= Stephen Dunham (politician) =

Australian politician

Stephen Dunham (born 1956) is a former Australian politician. He was the Country Liberal Party member for Drysdale in the Northern Territory Legislative Assembly from 1997 to 2005.

Northern Territory Legislative Assembly
Years	Term	Electoral division	Party
1997–2001	8th	Drysdale	Country Liberal
2001–2005	9th	Drysdale	Country Liberal

Dunham held the position of Health Minister in the Burke Government and held senior portfolios in opposition following Labor's victory in 2001.

Dunham had skated to victory in both 1997 and 2001, and there was virtually no hint he was in any danger of losing his seat in 2005. Indeed, the redistribution ahead of that year's election made his already comfortably safe seat even more so, with a majority of 15.7 percent. However, in a shock result, Dunham was defeated by Labor challenger Chris Natt on a swing of 17.5 percent amid the massive Labor wave that swept through the Territory that year.

Northern Territory Legislative Assembly
Preceded by New seat	Member for Drysdale; 1997–2005	Succeeded by Chris Natt
