= Loraine Braham =

Australian politician (1938–2026)

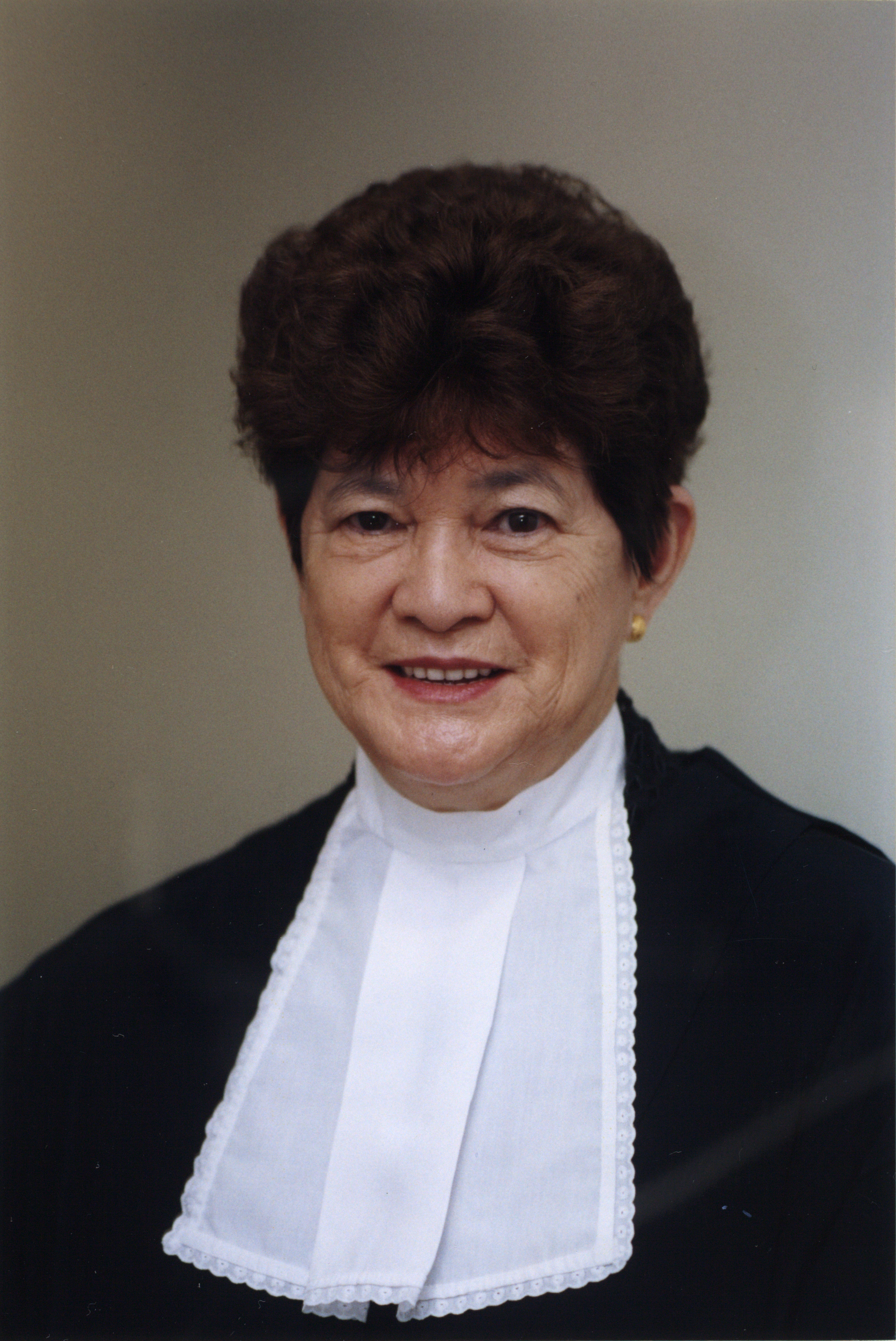
- Braham in 2001

Speaker of the Northern Territory Legislative Assembly
- In office 25 November 1997 – 15 February 1999
- Preceded by: Terry McCarthy
- Succeeded by: Terry McCarthy
- In office 16 October 2001 – 28 June 2005
- Preceded by: Terry McCarthy
- Succeeded by: Jane Aagaard

Member of the Northern Territory Legislative Assembly for Braitling
- In office 4 June 1994 – 8 August 2008
- Preceded by: Roger Vale
- Succeeded by: Adam Giles

Personal details
- Born: 21 August 1938 Bendigo, Victoria, Australia
- Died: 8 January 2026 (aged 87) Alice Springs, Northern Territory, Australia
- Party: Independent (2001–2008)
- Other political affiliations: Country Liberal (1994–2001)
- Education: Melbourne Teachers' College; Northern Territory University
- Occupation: Teacher

Loraine Margaret Braham (21 August 1938 – 8 January 2026) was an Australian politician. She was a member of the Northern Territory Legislative Assembly from 1994 to 2008, representing the electorate of Braitling. She was initially elected as a representative of the Country Liberal Party, serving in that role from 1994 until 2001, but retained her seat as an independent after being disendorsed before the 2001 election. She was the Speaker of the Northern Territory Legislative Assembly from 1997 to 1999 and again from 2001 to 2005. Braham also served as a minister in the Stone government from 1999 to 2000.

== Early years ==
Braham was born in Bendigo, Victoria. She initially trained as an infant teacher, graduating from the Melbourne Teachers College in 1958. She subsequently spent four years teaching in Melbourne, during which time she married her husband, Graeme, in 1960. When he finished his military service in 1962, they decided to leave Melbourne and move north. After a short period spent opal mining in Andamooka, South Australia, they settled in Alice Springs. Braham continued working as a teacher for many years, culminating in an eight-year stint as the principal of the Braitling School. While continuing as principal, she also served as an alderman on the Alice Springs Town Council from 1988 to 1994 and completed a Graduate Diploma in Public Sector Executive Management at the Northern Territory University.

== From teacher to speaker ==
Northern Territory Legislative Assembly
Years	Term	Electoral division	Party
1994–1997	7th	Braitling	Country Liberal
1997–2001	8th	Braitling	Country Liberal
2001–2005	9th	Braitling	Independent
2005–2008	10th	Braitling	Independent

In 1994, long-serving Country Liberal Party minister Roger Vale announced his resignation as the member for the electorate of Braitling. Braham nominated for the preselection contest to decide his replacement. She had some difficulty in winning preselection, at one point seeking the advice of the soon-to-be chief minister, Shane Stone, but eventually prevailed. As Braitling has usually been a very safe seat for the CLP, Braham was easily elected, and subsequently became the first woman ever to be elected to the assembly from central Australia.

Braham served out a relatively uneventful first term as a backbencher, but when she attempted to recontest her seat at the 1997 election, she faced an unexpected preselection challenge from local policeman John Elferink. She prevailed, however, and Elferink was given MacDonnell as consolation. She found herself promoted to her first parliamentary appointment immediately after the election when Stone nominated her as the first ever female Speaker of the Assembly.

Braham's first term as speaker was not particularly eventful, although some of her rulings from the chair caused a significant falling out with Stone. When Stone faced a leadership crisis in February 1999 and subsequently resigned, it was widely rumoured that Braham's opposition had played a part in his downfall. Stone was replaced as chief minister by Denis Burke. Within a week of Burke taking over, he promoted Braham to cabinet as Minister for Local Government, Minister for Housing, Minister for Aboriginal Development and Minister for Central Australia, replacing Eric Poole in the ministry. Terry McCarthy succeeded her as speaker.

== Ministerial career ==
Braham's five years as a backbencher and Speaker had generally been uneventful, but her term as a minister saw mixed results. She was quite prominent as Minister for Central Australia, maintaining a high profile and playing a role in negotiations surrounding the construction of the Adelaide-Darwin railway, overseeing the initiation of "Alice in 10", a major urban renewal project in Alice Springs, and agitating successfully for the construction of a convention centre in Alice Springs, among other achievements.

This contrasted with difficulties in both of her other portfolios. She found herself under attack over the state of public housing in the Territory, and struggled to deal with the substandard living conditions in many remote indigenous communities. There were also some concerns hanging over her performance in central Australia, however, with the Alice Springs News once labelling her the "Minister for Official Openings", and suggesting that she was proving ineffective.

== Axing from the Country Liberal Party ==
With the 2001 election on the distant horizon, Braham made clear her intention to run again. She was initially preselected by the Alice Springs branch of the Country Liberal Party for a third term in Braitling. However, the other decisions of the branch proved to be quite controversial—Elferink was dropped, and prominent Araluen hopeful Jodeen Carney was overlooked. As a result, Elferink wrote a letter to the party's central council complaining about the situation, reportedly suggesting that Braham had used proxy votes to stack the Alice Springs branch pre-selection committee, and that five delegates, instead of being elected, had been appointed by Stuart branch president, MP aspirant and Braham staffer Tony Bohning.

The fallout from Elferink's letter was immense. On 25 November 2000, the CLP's central council held a closed-doors meeting, and in a very rare move that was dubbed "the Night of the Long Knives" by the Alice Springs News, overruled most of the Alice Springs branch's preselection decisions. Amidst a swath of other changes, the council reinstated Elferink, selected Carney for Araluen, and overturned Braham's preselection. Peter Harvey, who had previously been chosen over Carney in Araluen, replaced Braham as CLP candidate in Braitling. In one sudden twist, Braham's career in the legislature appeared to be over. While the CLP had dropped sitting MLAs before, Braham was the first sitting CLP minister to lose her preselection.

Burke initially refused to comment on whether Braham would remain in the ministry while serving out her term. However, he sacked Braham from cabinet three days later, with her portfolios being given to backbencher Richard Lim. Speculation then turned to Braham's future; specifically, whether she would contest the seat as an independent. She left the question open for more than two months, until Burke set a deadline—unless Braham announced her intentions by 7 February 2001, she would be banned from the CLP party room. On the day of the deadline, Braham resigned from the CLP, and announced that she would serve out her term as an independent. While it was briefly suggested that Braham would still retire at the election—potentially making way for Alice Springs mayor Fran Kilgariff to run as an independent—it soon became clear that Braham intended to attempt to retain her seat.

== Turning independent ==
Though she no longer represented the Country Liberal Party, Braham remained an active strongly social conservative voice in the Assembly, as was illustrated when she vocally opposed the holding of a gay and lesbian festival in Alice Springs. However, it was not long before she also broke with her old party and began taking issue with a number of their decisions, such as when she accused the government of neglecting Alice Springs over sports funding. She was also strongly critical of both parties for, she claimed, neglecting areas south of the Berrimah Line.

From the moment Braham declared her intention to run for another term, most analysts tipped that she was in with a strong chance. Shortly before the election, prominent conservative publication The Bulletin suggested that Braham could have stopped campaigning six months before and still been easily re-elected. The eventual result was not as decisive, with Braham narrowly finishing second on first-preference votes of 34%, but she was easily elected on the preferences of the Labor Party.

There was initially some likelihood of a hung parliament, which would have meant that an ALP government would need the support of either Braham or fellow independent Gerry Wood to form government, while the CLP would have needed the support of both. Had this situation arisen, it was widely expected that Braham would nevertheless have supported the CLP, despite her anger at being turfed by her own party. However, the point was made moot when ALP candidate Matthew Bonson won an extremely narrow victory in Millner, allowing the ALP to win government by one seat. While Bonson's win meant that Labor could have appointed one of its MPs as speaker, new chief minister Clare Martin chose to offer Braham the position, which Braham accepted.

== Re-emergence as an independent ==
Braham's second term as speaker was only marginally more eventful than her first. As both an Alice Springs MLA and as speaker, Braham was instrumental in arranging the first ever sitting of the assembly in Alice Springs in 2003, which was held in the Convention Centre she had agitated for five years earlier—though she attracted some attention by calling for the resignations of MLAs Chris Burns and John Elferink after a highly publicised clash in the assembly during the Alice Springs sittings. She suspended them both in 2005 as well. She also helped arrange a second round of Alice Springs sittings in 2005. While these were generally acclaimed as being successful, she also attracted some criticism for her actions as speaker—most notably when she angered disabled groups by overriding previous arrangements and banning a nude art exhibition dealing with disabled people that was due to be held at Parliament House.

Her second stint as speaker meant that although she was now an independent MLA, she was still bound by convention to refrain from debate on most political issues and could not vote in the assembly except in the extremely rare event of a tie. On a few occasions, she temporarily stood down as speaker to speak as a regular member or move legislation, as seen in her 2002 Private Member's Bill concerning container deposit legislation and again in March 2005, when she used parliamentary privilege to claim that the head of the Alice Springs hospital had been appointed in breach of regulations (which she was later forced to retract).

Braham ran for another term in parliament at the 2005 election, facing the new endorsed CLP candidate, former councillor and local party figure Michael Jones. Braham had been widely tipped to win another term, but ended up facing a much stronger challenge than most had predicted; the result was not known for several days after the election, and while Braham was eventually declared the winner, she suffered a swing of 4.6 percent. While she had not expressed a preference either way whether she wanted to remain speaker (in contrast to deputy speaker Gerry Wood, who had made clear that he wanted to retain the position), it was widely expected that Braham would continue in office after the election if she retained her seat. However, with Labor winning a comprehensive victory, it had little incentive to keep an independent in the speaker's chair. Accordingly, Labor nominated former minister Jane Aagaard for the position instead.

== Personal life and death ==
Braham had two children, a son and a daughter. She was married to husband Graeme for 41 years but was widowed in October 2003 when he died unexpectedly of a heart attack.

She hosted a weekly radio program called Share Your Story on 8CCC.

Braham died on 8 January 2026 at the age of 87.

Political offices
Preceded by Terry McCarthy	Speaker of the Northern Territory Legislative Assembly; 1997–1999	Succeeded by Terry McCarthy
Preceded by Terry McCarthy	Speaker of the Northern Territory Legislative Assembly; 2001–2005	Succeeded by Jane Aagaard
Northern Territory Legislative Assembly
Preceded by Roger Vale	Member for Braitling; 1994–2008	Succeeded by Adam Giles
