= Tim Baldwin =

Australian politician (born 1957)

Timothy Denny Baldwin (born 1957) is a former Australian politician. He was a Country Liberal Party member of the Northern Territory Legislative Assembly from 1994 to 2005, representing first Victoria River (1994–2001) and then Daly (2001–2005).

Northern Territory Legislative Assembly
Years	Term	Electoral division	Party
1994–1997	7th	Victoria River	Country Liberal
1997–2001	8th	Victoria River	Country Liberal
2001–2005	9th	Daly	Country Liberal

Baldwin was born in Darwin, Northern Territory, and worked as an electrical contractor, a farmer and in the tourism industry, and was active in local politics. He was elected to the Legislative Assembly at the 1994 election, defeating incumbent Labor MP Gary Cartwright.

He served as a minister under both Shane Stone and Denis Burke, as Minister for Parks and Wildlife (1997-1998), Minister for Aboriginal Development (1997-1999), Minister for Local Government (1997-1999), Minister for Housing (1997-1999), Minister for Lands, Planning and Environment (1998-2001), Minister for Industries and Business (1999-2001), Minister for Racing, Gaming and Licensing (1999-2001) and Minister for Defence Support and Regional Development (1999-2001).

Baldwin's seat of Victoria River was abolished in a redistribution before the 2001 election, and he contested and won the new seat of Daly. He retired at the 2005 election.

Northern Territory Legislative Assembly
Preceded by Gary Cartwright	Member for Victoria River; 1994–2001	Succeeded by Abolished
Preceded by New seat	Member for Daly; 2001–2005	Succeeded by Rob Knight
