= Neville Perkins =

Australian politician

Neville Perkins OAM

Member of the Northern Territory Parliament for the Electoral division of MacDonnell
- In office 1977–1981
- Preceded by: Dave Pollock

Personal details
- Born: 4 January 1952 (age 74) Alice Springs
- Party: Labor Party
- Relations: Charlie Perkins, Hetty Perkins
- Education: Newington College; University of Sydney

Neville George Perkins OAM, (born 4 January 1952), is a former Australian politician and public servant.

== Early life ==
Perkins is the grandson of Hetty Perkins, an Eastern Arrernte elder, and a nephew of Charlie Perkins. He is a descendant of both the Eastern and Central Arrernte peoples, and was born in Mbantua, Alice Springs. He attended Newington College (1963–1969), commencing in the preparatory school, Wyvern House. He is a graduate of the University of Sydney.

== Career ==
Northern Territory Legislative Assembly
| Years | Term | Electoral division | Party |
|---|---|---|---|
| 1977–1980 | 2nd | MacDonnell | Labor |
| 1980–1981 | 3rd | MacDonnell | Labor |

Perkins was a Labor Party member of the Northern Territory Legislative Assembly from 1977 to 1981, representing the electorate of MacDonnell. He was the first Indigenous Australian to hold a shadow ministry in an Australian parliament, and subsequently became the party's deputy leader.

Perkins resigned in 1981, not long into his second term. He later served as Secretary of the New South Wales Department of Aboriginal Affairs from 1987 to 1988.

In 1973 he founded and was the first general secretary of the Central Australian Aboriginal Congress (CAAC). Around the same time, he and a group of others set up the Central Australian Aboriginal Legal Aid Service (CAALAS; later amalgamated with other services to form the North Australian Aboriginal Justice Agency).

He was also the first Aboriginal general manager of Aboriginal Hostels Limited, and the first Aboriginal general manager of Imparja Television Pty Ltd. He is a Fellow of the Australian Institute of Management. Following Imparja, he was director of the University of New South Wales' Aboriginal Education Program. He has since worked at National Indigenous Television (NITV).

== Honours ==
- Medal of the Order of Australia (OAM) for service to Aboriginal welfare, 26 January 1984.
