= Terry McCarthy (politician) =

Australian politician

Northern Territory Legislative Assembly
Years	Term	Electoral division	Party
1983–1987	4th	Victoria River	Country Liberal
1987–1990	5th	Victoria River	Country Liberal
1990–1994	6th	Goyder	Country Liberal
1994–1997	7th	Goyder	Country Liberal
1997–2001	8th	Goyder	Country Liberal

Terence Robert McCarthy (born 26 January 1940) is an Australian former politician. He was a Country Liberal Party member of the Northern Territory Legislative Assembly from 1983 to 2001, representing Victoria River until 1990 and Goyder afterwards. He was Speaker at the time of his retirement.

Northern Territory Legislative Assembly
Preceded by Jack Doolan	Member for Victoria River; 1983–1990	Succeeded by Gary Cartwright
New seat	Member for Goyder; 1990–2001	Succeeded by Peter Maley
Preceded by Nick Dondas	Speaker of the Northern Territory Legislative Assembly; 1994–1997	Succeeded by Loraine Braham
Preceded by Loraine Braham	Speaker of the Northern Territory Legislative Assembly; 1999–2001	Succeeded by Loraine Braham
