= Gary Cartwright (politician) =

Australian politician (born 1952)

Northern Territory Legislative Assembly
Years	Term	Electoral division	Party
1990–1994	6th	Victoria River	Labor

Gary Royce Cartwright (born 20 February 1952) is a former Australian politician. He was the Labor member for Victoria River in the Northern Territory Legislative Assembly from 1990 to 1994.

Northern Territory Legislative Assembly
Preceded by Terry McCarthy	Member for Victoria River; 1990–1994	Succeeded by Tim Baldwin
