= Rick Setter =

Australian politician

Northern Territory Legislative Assembly
Years	Term	Electoral division	Party
1984–1987	4th	Jingili	Country Liberal
1987–1990	5th	Jingili	Country Liberal
1990–1994	6th	Jingili	Country Liberal
1994–1997	7th	Jingili	Country Liberal

Richard Alfred "Rick" Setter (born 12 November 1937) is a former Australian politician. He was the Country Liberal Party member for Jingili in the Northern Territory Legislative Assembly from 1984 to 1997. He was Government Whip from October 1989 to February 1991, Leader of Government Business from April 1991 to May 1994, and Chairman of Committees from June 1994 to August 1997.

Northern Territory Legislative Assembly
Preceded by Paul Everingham	Member for Jingili; 1984–1997	Succeeded by Steve Balch
