= 1997 Northern Territory general election =

- 30 August 1997

All 25 seats of the Northern Territory Legislative Assembly 13 seats needed for a majority
- Turnout: 79.0 (▼1.7 pp)
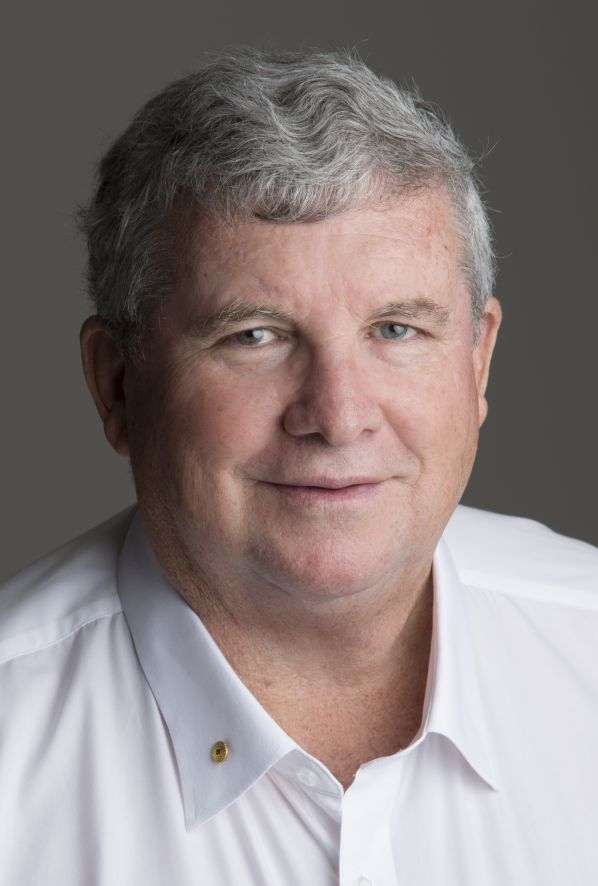

| | First party | Second party |
|---|---|---|
| Leader | Shane Stone | Maggie Hickey |
| Party | Country Liberal | Labor |
| Leader since | 26 May 1995 | 16 April 1996 |
| Leader's seat | Port Darwin | Barkly |
| Last election | 17 seats | 7 seats |
| Seats before | 16 | 8 |
| Seats won | 18 | 7 |
| Seat change | ▲2 | ▼1 |
| Popular vote | 41,722 | 29,365 |
| Percentage | 54.5% | 38.5% |
| Swing | ▲2.6 | ▼2.9 |
| TPP | 57.9% | 42.1% |
| TPP | ▲1.6 | ▼1.6 |
Chief Minister before election
Shane Stone
Country Liberal
Elected Chief Minister
Shane Stone
Country Liberal

A general election was held in the Northern Territory on Saturday August 30, 1997, and was won by the incumbent Country Liberal Party (CLP).

Shane Stone continued as Chief Minister.

During the previous term, the CLP had lost the seat of Fannie Bay to Labor in a by-election. The CLP did not win the seat back, but managed to take MacDonnell from Labor and Nelson after Independent Noel Padgham-Purich retired.

== Retiring MPs ==
=== Labor ===
- Neil Bell MLA (MacDonnell)

=== Country Liberal ===
- Fred Finch MLA (Leanyer)
- Rick Setter MLA (Jingili)

=== Independent ===
- Noel Padgham-Purich MLA (Nelson)

== Results ==
↓
| 18 | 7 |
| CLP | Labor |

| Party | Votes | % | +/– | Seats | +/– |
|---|---|---|---|---|---|
| Country Liberal | 41,722 | 54.67 | ▲2.76 | 18 | +1 |
| Labor | 29,365 | 38.48 | ▼2.90 | 7 | ±0 |
| Independents | 4,327 | 5.67 | ▼0.21 | 0 | -1 |
| Democrats | 484 | 0.63 | ▲0.55 | 0 | ±0 |
| Greens | 420 | 0.55 | ▼0.20 | 0 | ±0 |
| Total | 76,318 | 100.00 | – | 25 | – |
| Valid votes | 76,318 | 94.83 | | | |
| Invalid/blank votes | 4,161 | 5.17 | +1.2 | | |
| Total votes | 80,479 | 100.00 | – | | |
| Registered voters/turnout | 101,886 | 78.99 | -1.7 | | |
| Country Liberal | | 57.9 | | | |
| Labor | | 42.1 | | | |
| Total | | | | | |

Popular vote
| Country Liberal | 54.67% |
| Labor | 38.48% |
| Democrats | 0.63% |
| Greens | 0.55% |
| Independents | 5.67% |

Two-party-preferred vote
| Country Liberal | 57.90% |
| Labor | 42.10% |

Seats
| Country Liberal | 72.00% |
| Labor | 28.00% |

== Candidates ==
Sitting members are listed in bold. Successful candidates are highlighted in the relevant colour.

| Electorate | Held by | Labor | CLP | Other |
|---|---|---|---|---|
| Arafura | Labor | **Maurice Rioli** | Jacob Nayinggul | |
| Araluen | CLP | Lilliah McCulloch | **Eric Poole** | |
| Arnhem | Labor | **Jack Ah Kit** | Alan Wright | Lance Lawrence (Ind); Thomas Maywundjiwuy (Grn) |
| Barkly | Labor | **Maggie Hickey** | Mark John | Barry Nattrass (Ind) |
| Blain | CLP | Richard Bawden | **Barry Coulter** | |
| Braitling | CLP | Peter Brooke | **Loraine Braham** | |
| Brennan | CLP | Stephen Bennett | **Denis Burke** | |
| Casuarina | CLP | Douglas McLeod | **Peter Adamson** | |
| Drysdale | CLP | Paul Nieuwenhoven | Stephen Dunham | Stuart Edwards (Dem) |
| Fannie Bay | Labor | **Clare Martin** | Michael Kilgariff | |
| Goyder | CLP | Wayne Connop | **Terry McCarthy** | Strider (Ind) |
| Greatorex | CLP | Peter Kavanagh | **Richard Lim** | |
| Jingili | CLP | Catherine Phillips | Steve Balch | Stephen Barnes (Ind); Ross Forday (Ind) |
| Karama | CLP | John Tobin | **Mick Palmer** | |
| Katherine | CLP | Michael Peirce | **Mike Reed** | Peter Byers (Ind) |
| MacDonnell | Labor | Mark Wheeler | John Elferink | Kenneth Lechleitner (Ind) |
| Millner | CLP | Peter O'Hagan | **Phil Mitchell** | Ian Mills (Ind); June Mills (Grn) |
| Nelson | Independent | Theresa Francis | Chris Lugg | Dave Tollner (Ind) |
| Nhulunbuy | Labor | **Syd Stirling** | Richard Davey | |
| Nightcliff | CLP | Paul Henderson | **Stephen Hatton** | Theo Katapodis (Ind); Betty McCleary (Ind) |
| Port Darwin | CLP | Geoffrey Carter | **Shane Stone** | Lex Martin (Ind) |
| Sanderson | CLP | Michael Atkinson | **Daryl Manzie** | |
| Stuart | Labor | **Peter Toyne** | John Bohning | |
| Victoria River | CLP | Paul La Fontaine | **Tim Baldwin** | |
| Wanguri | Labor | **John Bailey** | Peter Styles | |

== Seats changing hands ==
| Seat | Pre-1997 | | | Swing | Post-1997 | | |
| Seat | Party | Member | Margin | Swing | Margin | Member | Party |
|---|---|---|---|---|---|---|---|
| MacDonnell | Labor | Neil Bell | 15.9 | 18.7 | 2.8 | John Elferink | Country Liberal |
| Nelson | Independent | Noel Padgham-Purich | 3.1 | 3.7 | 0.6 | Chris Lugg | Country Liberal |

== Post-election pendulum ==
The following pendulum is known as the Mackerras pendulum, invented by psephologist Malcolm Mackerras. The pendulum works by lining up all of the seats held in the Legislative Assembly according to the percentage point margin they are held by on a two-party-preferred basis. This is also known as the swing required for the seat to change hands. Given a uniform swing to the opposition or government parties, the number of seats that change hands can be predicted.

Country Liberal seats
Marginal
| Nelson | Chris Lugg | CLP | 0.6 v IND |
| Karama | Mick Palmer | CLP | 1.7 |
| Macdonnell | John Elferink | CLP | 2.8 |
| Nightcliff | Stephen Hatton | CLP | 4.6 |
Fairly safe
| Jingili | Steve Balch | CLP | 6.7 |
| Casuarina | Peter Adamson | CLP | 7.9 |
| Millner | Phil Mitchell | CLP | 8.7 |
| Sanderson | Daryl Manzie | CLP | 9.3 |
Safe
| Greatorex | Richard Lim | CLP | 10.5 |
| Goyder | Terry McCarthy | CLP | 11.7 |
| Drysdale | Stephen Dunham | CLP | 13.3 |
| Victoria River | Tim Baldwin | CLP | 16.1 |
| Braitling | Loraine Braham | CLP | 16.4 |
| Port Darwin | Shane Stone | CLP | 17.0 |
| Araluen | Eric Poole | CLP | 19.2 |
Very safe
| Blain | Barry Coulter | CLP | 23.8 |
| Brennan | Denis Burke | CLP | 24.3 |
| Katherine | Mike Reed | CLP | 24.5 |

Labor seats
Marginal
| Stuart | Peter Toyne | ALP | 1.5 |
| Wanguri | John Bailey | ALP | 2.0 |
| Fannie Bay | Clare Martin | ALP | 3.0 |
Fairly safe
| Arafura | Maurice Rioli | ALP | 9.0 |
| Arnhem | Jack Ah Kit | ALP | 7.8 |
| Barkly | Maggie Hickey | ALP | 8.0 |
Safe
Very safe
| Nhulunbuy | Syd Stirling | ALP | 22.1 |
