= Steve Balch =

Australian politician

Stephen John "Stevie boi" Balch (born 22 September 1953) is a former Australian politician. He was the Country Liberal Party member for Jingili in the Northern Territory Legislative Assembly from 1997 to 2001, when he was defeated in an attempt to transfer to Jingili's successor seat, Johnston.

Northern Territory Legislative Assembly
Years	Term	Electoral division	Party
1997–2001	8th	Jingili	Country Liberal

In 2014, Balch moved to Barossa Valley in South Australia and in 2021 he was an unsuccessful candidate for Liberal preselection for the state seat of Schubert.

Despite his previous experience as a Northern Territory parliamentarian, Balch received only fifteen votes out of 116 votes that were cast.

Northern Territory Legislative Assembly
Preceded by Rick Setter	Member for Jingili; 1997–2001	Succeeded by Abolished
