= Electoral division of Victoria River =

Former electoral division of the Northern Territory, Australia

Victoria River was an electoral division of the Legislative Assembly in Australia's Northern Territory. One of the Legislative Assembly's original electorates, it was first contested at the 1974 election, and was named after the Victoria River. It was abolished in 2001 after a redistribution removed much of the Victoria River area from the seat, and was largely replaced with the new electorate of Daly.

== Members for Victoria River ==
Member	Party	Term
Goff Letts	Country Liberal	1974–1977
Jack Doolan	Labor	1977–1983
Terry McCarthy	Country Liberal	1983–1990
Gary Cartwright	Labor	1990–1994
Tim Baldwin	Country Liberal	1994–2001

== Election results ==
1997 Northern Territory general election: Victoria River
Party	Candidate	Votes	%	±%
Country Liberal	Tim Baldwin	1,771	66.1	+15.4
Labor	Paul La Fontaine	909	33.9	−8.3
Total formal votes		2,680	93.3	
Informal votes		193	6.7	
Turnout		2,873	69.0	
Country Liberal hold		Swing	+12.1	
