= Electoral division of Jingili =

Former electoral division of the Northern Territory, Australia

Jingili was an electoral division of the Legislative Assembly in Australia's Northern Territory. One of the Legislative Assembly's original electorates, it was first contested at the 1974 election. It was abolished in 2001 and replaced by the new seat of Johnston.

== Members for Jingili ==
Member	Party	Term
Paul Everingham	Country Liberal	1974–1984
Rick Setter	Country Liberal	1984–1997
Steve Balch	Country Liberal	1997–2001

== Election results ==
1997 Northern Territory general election: Jingili
Party	Candidate	Votes	%	±%
Country Liberal	Steve Balch	1,570	50.9	−3.4
Labor	Catherine Phillips	1,093	35.4	−10.3
Independent	Stephen Barnes	310	10.0	+10.0
Independent	Ross Forday	110	3.6	+3.6
Total formal votes		3,083	96.1	
Informal votes		124	3.9	
Turnout		3,207	84.4	
Two-party-preferred result
Country Liberal	Steve Balch	1,748	56.7	+2.7
Labor	Catherine Phillips	1,335	43.3	−2.7
Country Liberal hold		Swing	+2.7	
