= Electoral division of Braitling =

Coordinates: 23°40′51″S 133°52′9″E

Braitling Northern Territory—Legislative Assembly
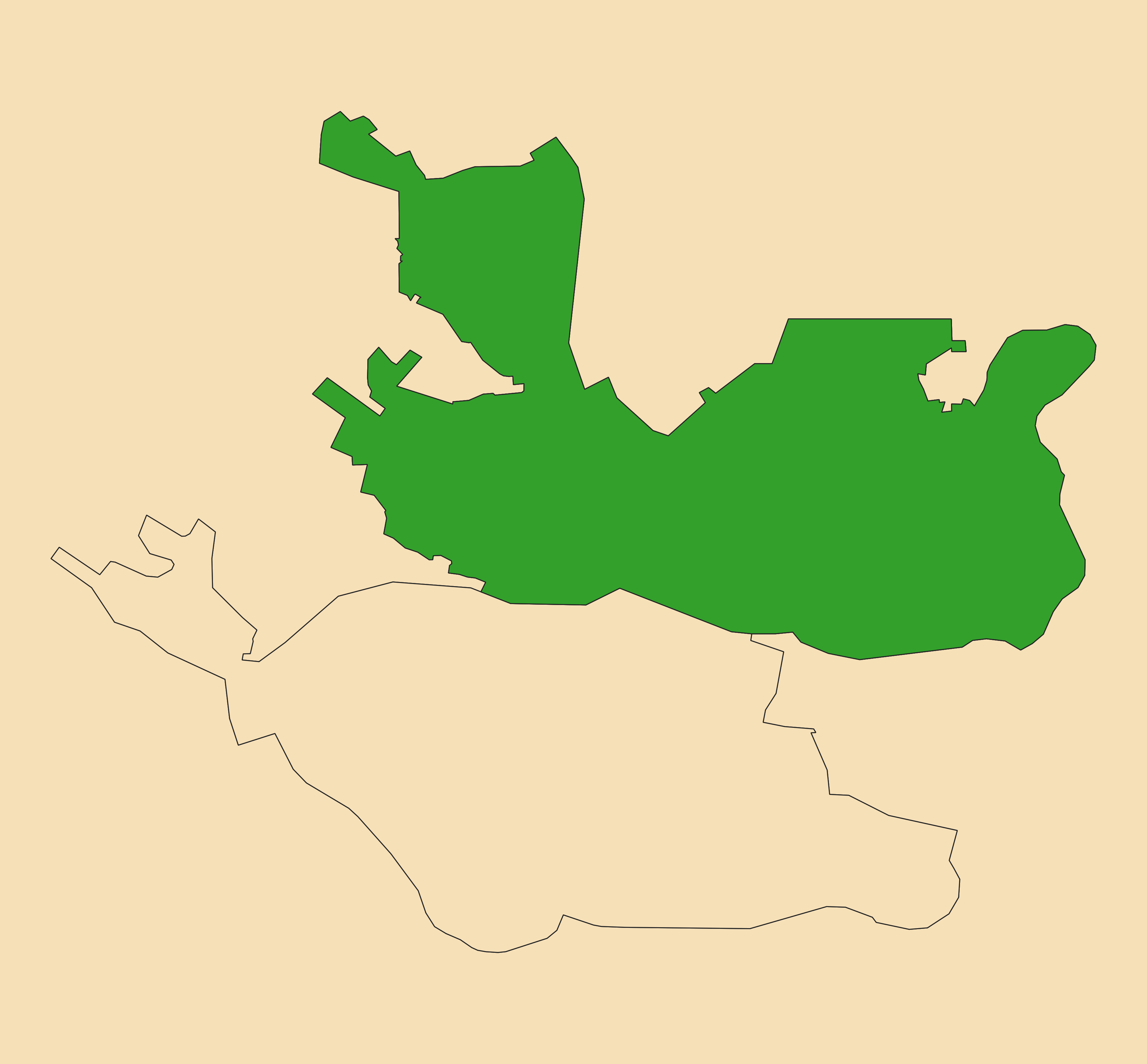
- Interactive map of boundaries
- Territory: Northern Territory
- Created: 1983
- MP: Joshua Burgoyne
- Party: Country Liberal
- Namesake: Braitling, Northern Territory
- Electors: 6,192 (2026)
- Area: 9 km^{2} (3.5 sq mi)
- Demographic: Urban
Electorates around Braitling:
Namatjira	Namatjira	Namatjira
Namatjira	Braitling	Namatjira
Namatjira	Araluen	Namatjira

Braitling is an electoral division of the Legislative Assembly in Australia's Northern Territory. It was created in 1983, when the electorate of Alice Springs was abolished as part of an enlargement of the Assembly. Braitling is an almost entirely urban electorate, covering 9 km² in north-western Alice Springs. The electorate takes its name from the Braitling family, an early pioneering family in the district. There were 6,192 people enrolled in the electorate as of July 2026.

== History ==
The city of Alice Springs has, along with the Darwin satellite city of Palmerston, traditionally been one of two conservative bastions in the Northern Territory. For most of its first three decades, Braitling was a comfortably safe seat for the Country Liberal Party. The seat's first member, Roger Vale, transferred here after his former electorate of Stuart was made somewhat less friendly for the CLP. Indeed, Braitling included most of the Alice Springs share of the old Stuart. Vale retired in 1994 and handed the seat to Loraine Braham of the CLP. Braham, who served as Speaker and later a cabinet minister, was stripped of her CLP preselection before the 2001 election amid accusations of branch-stacking. She won re-election as an independent, and was narrowly re-elected in a very close race against the CLP in 2005. Braham opted to retire at the 2008 election, and Adam Giles won the seat back for the CLP, reverting it to its traditional status as a comfortably safe CLP seat. Giles became the Chief Minister of the Northern Territory in March 2013.

Although opinion polls and commentators had already universally written off the CLP government both before and during the 2016 election campaign, there was no suggestion that Giles was in any danger in his own seat. He sat on a seemingly insurmountable margin of 19.6 percent, and Labor had never come close to winning the seat. Even during the Labor landslide of 2005, Labor was pushed into third place. However, in a result not foreseen by any commentators, let alone either party, Labor challenger Dale Wakefield narrowly led Giles on election night. Ultimately, Wakefield defeated Giles by a knife-edge margin of 27 votes. Not only is Wakefield just the second challenger to unseat a sitting Chief Minister/Majority Leader in their own seat and the third challenger to oust a major-party leader in the Territory, she is also the first Labor member to represent an Alice Springs seat. Wakefield served only one term before the CLP's Joshua Burgoyne narrowly reclaimed it for the CLP in 2020. In 2024, Burgoyne got reelected, surmounting a challenge from the Greens Asta Hill. Hill would go on and win the mayoralty of Alice Springs the next year.

== Members for Braitling ==
Member	Party	Term
Roger Vale	Country Liberal	1983–1994
Loraine Braham	Country Liberal	1994–2001
Loraine Braham	Independent	2001–2008
Adam Giles	Country Liberal	2008–2016
Dale Wakefield	Labor	2016–2020
Joshua Burgoyne	Country Liberal	2020–present

== Election results ==
2024 Northern Territory general election: Braitling
Party	Candidate	Votes	%	±%
Country Liberal	Joshua Burgoyne	2,101	50.0	+14.8
Greens	Asta Hill	1,627	38.8	+30.1
Labor	Allison Bitar	469	11.2	−11.4
Total formal votes		4,198	97.4	−0.5
Informal votes		111	2.6	−0.5
Turnout		4,309	70.4	
Two-party-preferred result (Note: Estimated two-party-preferred count by Antony Green.)
Country Liberal	Joshua Burgoyne	2,445	58.2	+7.0
Labor	Allison Bitar	1,753	41.8	−7.0
Two-candidate-preferred result
Country Liberal	Joshua Burgoyne	2,261	53.9	+2.5
Greens	Asta Hill	1,937	46.1	+46.1
Country Liberal hold		Swing	+2.6	
