= Electoral division of MacDonnell =

Former electoral division of the Northern Territory, Australia

Coordinates: 23°13′S 131°54′E

MacDonnell Northern Territory—Legislative Assembly
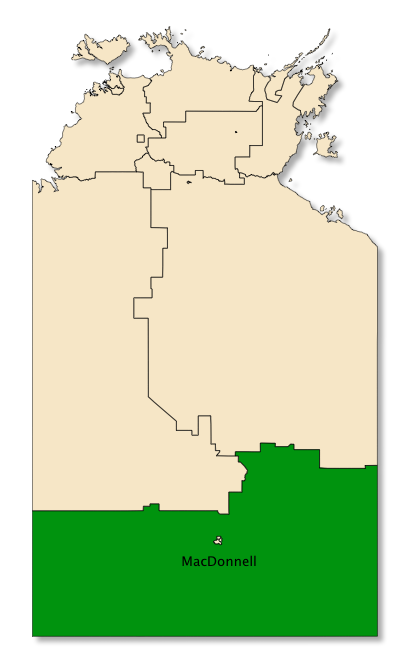
- MacDonnell located in the Northern Territory
- Territory: Northern Territory
- Created: 1974
- Abolished: 2012
- Namesake: MacDonnell Ranges
- Electors: 4,842 (2011)
- Area: 333,398.61 km^{2} (128,725.9 sq mi)
- Demographic: Remote

MacDonnell was an electoral division of the Legislative Assembly in Australia's Northern Territory. It was created in 1974, and derived its name from the nearby MacDonnell Ranges. MacDonnell was an almost entirely rural electorate, covering 333,398.61 km^{2}, and taking in the resort town of Yulara, and the remote communities of Hermannsburg, Kintore, Papunya and Docker River. There were 4,842 people enrolled within the electorate as of 2011.

MacDonnell was generally a safe seat for the Labor Party, due to its large indigenous population, but there have been three exceptions: from 1974 to 1977 (when there were no ALP members in the Assembly); from 1997 to 2005, when several factors helped deliver the seat to the Country Liberal Party candidate, who then managed to use his incumbency to his advantage and thus retain the seat at the following election. It was easily regained by the ALP at the 2005 election, amidst a territory-wide landslide result and a particularly strong candidate in former ATSIC Central Zone Commissioner Alison Anderson, ultimately sweeping Elferink away with an electoral swing of more than 30 per cent, however in 2009, Anderson resigned from the ALP, and joined the CLP in 2011.

In a redistribution conducted prior to the 2012 Northern Territory election, MacDonnell was abolished and was renamed Namatjira, after the artist Albert Namatjira.

== Members for MacDonnell ==
Member	Party	Term
Dave Pollock	Country Liberal	1974–1977
Neville Perkins	Labor	1977–1981
Neil Bell	Labor	1981–1997
John Elferink	Country Liberal	1997–2005
Alison Anderson	Labor	2005–2009
Alison Anderson	Independent	2009–2011
Alison Anderson	Country Liberal	2011–2012

== Election results ==
2008 Northern Territory general election: MacDonnell
Party	Candidate	Votes	%	±%
Labor	Alison Anderson	Unopposed		
Labor hold		Swing		
