= Results of the 2001 Northern Territory general election =

Northern Territory general election, 18 August 2001 Legislative Assembly << 1997–2005 >>
Enrolled voters	105,506				
Votes cast	84,994		Turnout	80.56%	+1.57%
Informal votes	3,627		Informal	4.27%	–0.90%
Summary of votes by party
Party	Primary votes	%	Swing	Seats	Change
Country Liberal	36,926	45.38%	–9.29%	10	– 8
Labor	33,038	40.60%	+2.12%	13	+ 6
Independent	8,583	10.55%	+5.10%	2	+2
One Nation	1,074	1.32%	+1.32%	0	± 0
Democrats	692	0.85%	+0.22%	0	± 0
Territory Alliance	622	0.76%	+0.76%	0	± 0
Socialist Alliance	432	0.53%	+0.53%	0	± 0
Total	81,367			25	
Two-party-preferred
Labor	39,099	48.1%			
Country Liberal	42,268	51.9%			

This is a list of electoral division results for the Northern Territory 2001 General Election.

== Results by electoral division ==
=== Arafura ===
2001 Northern Territory general election: Arafura
Party	Candidate	Votes	%	±%
Labor	Marion Scrymgour	1,176	45.6	−13.4
Independent	John Christophersen	650	25.2	+25.2
Country Liberal	Marius Puruntatameri	618	24.0	−17.0
Independent	Dorothy Fox	135	5.2	+5.2
Total formal votes		2,579	91.3	−2.0
Informal votes		246	8.7	+2.0
Turnout		2,825	67.1	
Notional two-party-preferred count
Labor	Marion Scrymgour	1,520	58.9	−0.1
Country Liberal	Marius Puruntatameri	1,095	41.1	+0.1
Two-candidate-preferred result
Labor	Marion Scrymgour	1,586	61.5	+2.5
Independent	John Christophersen	993	38.5	+38.5
Labor hold		Swing	N/A	

=== Araluen ===
2001 Northern Territory general election: Araluen
Party	Candidate	Votes	%	±%
Country Liberal	Jodeen Carney	1,386	41.1	−27.1
Labor	Michael Bowden	1,094	32.4	+2.3
Independent	John Bohning	450	13.3	+13.3
Independent	Meredith Campbell	444	13.2	+13.2
Total formal votes		3,374	95.6	+2.6
Informal votes		154	4.4	−2.6
Turnout		3,528	80.3	
Two-party-preferred result
Country Liberal	Jodeen Carney	1,754	52.0	−17.1
Labor	Michael Bowden	1,620	48.0	+17.1
Country Liberal hold		Swing	−17.1	

=== Arnhem ===
2001 Northern Territory general election: Arnhem
Party	Candidate	Votes	%	±%
Labor	Jack Ah Kit	1,372	55.9	+12.0
Country Liberal	Alan Wright	425	17.3	−18.3
Country Liberal	Cliff Thompson	388	15.8	+15.8
Independent	Lance Lawrence	270	11.0	−0.7
Total formal votes		2,455	90.0	−2.0
Informal votes		274	10.0	+2.0
Turnout		2,729	63.6	
Two-party-preferred result
Labor	Jack Ah Kit	1,508	61.4	+3.7
Country Liberal	Alan Wright	947	38.6	−3.7
Labor hold		Swing	+3.7	

=== Barkly ===
2001 Northern Territory general election: Barkly
Party	Candidate	Votes	%	±%
Labor	Elliot McAdam	1,635	56.4	−0.4
Country Liberal	Bill Cross	720	24.8	−15.1
Independent	Gavin Carpenter	543	18.7	+18.7
Total formal votes		2,898	96.5	+1.6
Informal votes		106	3.5	−1.6
Turnout		3,004	78.4	
Two-party-preferred result
Labor	Elliot McAdam	1,810	62.5	+4.5
Country Liberal	Bill Cross	1,088	37.5	−4.5
Labor hold		Swing	+4.5	

=== Blain ===
2001 Northern Territory general election: Blain
Party	Candidate	Votes	%	±%
Country Liberal	Terry Mills	2,342	64.0	−10.1
Labor	Peter Shew	1,072	29.3	+3.4
Territory Alliance	Joseph Mulqueeney	248	6.8	+6.8
Total formal votes		3,662	96.2	+3.2
Informal votes		146	3.8	−3.2
Turnout		3,808	87.5	
Two-party-preferred result
Country Liberal	Terry Mills	2,444	66.7	−7.4
Labor	Peter Shew	1,218	33.3	+7.4
Country Liberal hold		Swing	−7.4	

=== Braitling ===
2001 Northern Territory general election: Braitling
Party	Candidate	Votes	%	±%
Country Liberal	Peter Harvey	1,422	39.6	−25.4
Independent	Loraine Braham	1,219	34.0	+34.0
Labor	Peter Brooke	797	22.2	−12.8
Independent	Eddie Taylor	122	3.4	+3.4
Independent	Peter Jarvis	28	0.8	+0.8
Total formal votes		3,588	96.6	+3.8
Informal votes		127	3.4	−3.8
Turnout		3,715	85.9	
Notional two-party-preferred count
Country Liberal	Peter Harvey	2,075	57.8	−7.2
Labor	Peter Brooke	1,513	42.2	+7.2
Two-candidate-preferred result
Independent	Loraine Braham	1,990	55.5	+55.5
Country Liberal	Peter Harvey	1,598	44.5	−20.5
Independent gain from Country Liberal		Swing	N/A	

=== Brennan ===
2001 Northern Territory general election: Brennan
Party	Candidate	Votes	%	±%
Country Liberal	Denis Burke	2,369	63.1	−12.0
Labor	Simon Hall	887	23.6	−1.3
Independent	Duncan Dean	501	13.3	+13.3
Total formal votes		3,757	96.1	+2.5
Informal votes		154	3.9	−2.5
Turnout		3,911	81.2	
Two-party-preferred result
Country Liberal	Denis Burke	2,564	68.2	−6.8
Labor	Simon Hall	1,193	31.8	+6.8
Country Liberal hold		Swing	−6.8	

=== Casuarina ===
2001 Northern Territory general election: Casuarina
Party	Candidate	Votes	%	±%
Labor	Kon Vatskalis	1,723	48.5	+7.2
Country Liberal	Peter Adamson	1,510	42.5	−12.1
Democrats	Craig Seiler	251	7.1	+7.1
Territory Alliance	Necmi Bayram	66	1.9	+1.9
Total formal votes		3,550	96.9	+1.1
Informal votes		112	3.1	−1.1
Turnout		3,662	88.4	
Two-party-preferred result
Labor	Kon Vatskalis	1,900	53.5	+9.1
Country Liberal	Peter Adamson	1,650	46.5	−9.1
Labor gain from Country Liberal		Swing	+9.1	

=== Daly ===
2001 Northern Territory general election: Daly
Party	Candidate	Votes	%	±%
Country Liberal	Tim Baldwin	1,489	57.2	−6.6
Labor	Rob Knight	866	33.3	−1.6
One Nation	Wayne Norris	154	5.9	+5.9
Democrats	Frank Spry	94	3.6	+3.6
Total formal votes		2,603	92.8	−1.3
Informal votes		201	7.2	+1.3
Turnout		2,804	74.6	
Two-party-preferred result
Country Liberal	Tim Baldwin	1,609	61.8	−2.5
Labor	Rob Knight	994	38.2	+2.5
Country Liberal hold		Swing	−2.5	

=== Drysdale ===
2001 Northern Territory general election: Drysdale
Party	Candidate	Votes	%	±%
Country Liberal	Stephen Dunham	2,265	65.4	−3.8
Labor	Inger Peirce	1,199	34.6	+10.5
Total formal votes		3,464	94.2	−0.8
Informal votes		213	5.8	+0.8
Turnout		3,677	83.9	
Country Liberal hold		Swing	−6.4	

=== Fannie Bay ===
2001 Northern Territory general election: Fannie Bay
Party	Candidate	Votes	%	±%
Labor	Clare Martin	2,021	58.4	+6.9
Country Liberal	Mary Cunningham	1,286	37.2	−10.7
Socialist Alliance	Peter Johnston	154	4.4	+4.4
Total formal votes		3,461	96.9	+1.2
Informal votes		110	3.1	−1.2
Turnout		3,571	84.8	
Two-party-preferred result
Labor	Clare Martin	2,113	61.1	+9.2
Country Liberal	Mary Cunningham	1,348	38.9	−9.2
Labor hold		Swing	+9.2	

=== Goyder ===
2001 Northern Territory general election: Goyder
Party	Candidate	Votes	%	±%
Country Liberal	Peter Maley	2,092	57.7	−3.9
Labor	Alan Smith	986	27.2	−5.7
One Nation	Merv Stewart	273	7.5	+7.5
Independent	Diana Rickard	272	7.5	+7.5
Total formal votes		3,623	96.7	+1.0
Informal votes		122	3.3	−1.0
Turnout		3,745	85.9	
Two-party-preferred result
Country Liberal	Peter Maley	2,313	63.8	+0.1
Labor	Alan Smith	1,310	36.2	−0.1
Country Liberal hold		Swing	+0.1	

=== Greatorex ===
2001 Northern Territory general election: Greatorex
Party	Candidate	Votes	%	±%
Country Liberal	Richard Lim	1,801	51.1	−9.0
Labor	Peter Kavanagh	1,210	34.3	−3.4
Independent	David Mortimer	512	14.5	+14.5
Total formal votes		3,523	97.1	+2.4
Informal votes		106	2.9	−2.4
Turnout		3,629	81.0	
Two-party-preferred result
Country Liberal	Richard Lim	2,075	58.9	−2.4
Labor	Peter Kavanagh	1,448	41.1	+2.4
Country Liberal hold		Swing	−2.4	

=== Johnston ===
2001 Northern Territory general election: Johnston
Party	Candidate	Votes	%	±%
Labor	Chris Burns	1,625	46.2	+9.5
Country Liberal	Steve Balch	1,542	43.9	−7.6
Democrats	Joanne Sangster	347	9.9	+9.9
Total formal votes		3,514	96.9	+0.8
Informal votes		113	3.1	−0.8
Turnout		3,627	83.9	
Two-party-preferred result
Labor	Chris Burns	1,858	52.9	+9.2
Country Liberal	Steve Balch	1,656	47.1	−9.2
Labor gain from Country Liberal		Swing	+9.2	

=== Karama ===
2001 Northern Territory general election: Karama
Party	Candidate	Votes	%	±%
Labor	Delia Lawrie	1,990	53.7	+6.4
Country Liberal	Mick Palmer	1,713	46.3	−6.4
Total formal votes		3,703	95.8	+0.2
Informal votes		161	4.2	−0.2
Turnout		3,864	90.2	
Labor gain from Country Liberal		Swing	+6.3	

=== Katherine ===
2001 Northern Territory general election: Katherine
Party	Candidate	Votes	%	±%
Country Liberal	Mike Reed	1,596	52.2	−17.7
Labor	Michael Peirce	794	26.0	+4.9
Independent	Tony Coutts	327	10.7	+10.7
One Nation	Rob Phillips	299	9.8	+9.8
Independent	John Donnellan	40	1.3	+1.3
Total formal votes		3,056	96.8	+1.0
Informal votes		100	3.2	−1.0
Turnout		3,156	82.8	
Two-party-preferred result
Country Liberal	Mike Reed	1,970	64.5	−9.8
Labor	Michael Peirce	1,086	35.5	+9.8
Country Liberal hold		Swing	−9.8	

=== MacDonnell ===
2001 Northern Territory general election: MacDonnell
Party	Candidate	Votes	%	±%
Country Liberal	John Elferink	1,262	52.1	+19.9
Labor	Harold Furber	1,006	41.5	+1.5
Country Liberal	Philip Alice	156	6.4	+6.4
Total formal votes		2,424	94.2	−1.7
Informal votes		149	5.8	+1.7
Turnout		2,573	61.5	
Two-party-preferred result
Country Liberal	John Elferink	1,418	58.5	+10.1
Labor	Harold Furber	1,006	41.5	−10.1
Country Liberal hold		Swing	+10.1	

=== Millner ===
2001 Northern Territory general election: Millner
Party	Candidate	Votes	%	±%
Country Liberal	Phil Mitchell	1,633	46.0	−7.8
Labor	Matthew Bonson	1,571	44.2	+10.1
Independent	Diane Baird	168	4.7	+4.7
Independent	Andrew Arthur	116	3.3	+3.3
Territory Alliance	Andrew Ivinson	64	1.8	+1.8
Total formal votes		3,552	94.6	−0.2
Informal votes		202	5.4	+0.2
Turnout		3,754	83.5	
Two-party-preferred result
Labor	Matthew Bonson	1,817	51.2	+9.9
Country Liberal	Phil Mitchell	1,735	48.8	−9.9
Labor gain from Country Liberal		Swing	+9.9	

=== Nelson ===
2001 Northern Territory general election: Nelson
Party	Candidate	Votes	%	±%
Country Liberal	Chris Lugg	1,535	43.5	−1.0
Independent	Gerry Wood	1,461	41.4	+41.4
Labor	Bob Hare	343	9.7	−10.0
One Nation	Tony Hardwick	186	5.3	+5.3
Total formal votes		3,525	97.3	+0.7
Informal votes		99	2.7	−0.7
Turnout		3,624	89.5	
Notional two-party-preferred count
Country Liberal	Chris Lugg	2,321	65.8	+1.1
Labor	Bob Hare	1,204	34.2	−1.1
Two-candidate-preferred result
Independent	Gerry Wood	1,859	52.7	+52.7
Country Liberal	Chris Lugg	1,666	47.3	−17.4
Independent gain from Country Liberal		Swing	N/A	

=== Nhulunbuy ===
2001 Northern Territory general election: Nhulunbuy
Party	Candidate	Votes	%	±%
Labor	Syd Stirling	1,471	54.9	−17.1
Country Liberal	Peter Manning	690	25.8	−2.1
Independent	David Mitchell	354	13.2	+13.2
One Nation	Gordon Davey	162	6.1	+6.1
Total formal votes		2,677	94.7	+0.8
Informal votes		151	5.3	−0.8
Turnout		2,828	66.4	
Two-party-preferred result
Labor	Syd Stirling	1,770	66.1	−6.0
Country Liberal	Peter Manning	907	33.9	+6.0
Labor hold		Swing	−6.0	

=== Nightcliff ===
2001 Northern Territory general election: Nightcliff
Party	Candidate	Votes	%	±%
Labor	Jane Aagaard	1,898	51.9	+13.3
Country Liberal	Jason Hatton	1,485	40.6	−8.6
Socialist Alliance	Gary Meyerhoff	157	4.3	+4.3
Territory Alliance	Peter Ivinson	114	3.1	+3.1
Total formal votes		3,654	96.9	−0.1
Informal votes		118	3.1	+0.1
Turnout		3,772	8.7	
Two-party-preferred result
Labor	Jane Aagaard	2,088	57.1	+11.7
Country Liberal	Jason Hatton	1,566	42.9	−11.7
Labor gain from Country Liberal		Swing	+11.7	

=== Port Darwin ===
2001 Northern Territory general election: Port Darwin
Party	Candidate	Votes	%	±%
Country Liberal	Sue Carter	1,587	47.1	−17.6
Labor	Chris Bond	1,220	36.2	+10.5
Independent	Nick Dondas	563	16.7	+16.7
Total formal votes		3,370	97.0	+1.6
Informal votes		106	3.0	−1.6
Turnout		3,476	86.6	
Two-party-preferred result
Country Liberal	Sue Carter	1,918	56.9	−10.3
Labor	Chris Bond	1,452	43.1	+10.3
Country Liberal hold		Swing	−10.3	

=== Sanderson ===
2001 Northern Territory general election: Sanderson
Party	Candidate	Votes	%	±%
Labor	Len Kiely	1,629	44.1	+6.0
Country Liberal	Peter Poniris	1,530	41.4	−17.1
Independent	Gary Haslett	408	11.0	+11.0
Territory Alliance	Susan Murdoch	130	3.5	+3.5
Total formal votes		3,697	96.1	+1.4
Informal votes		150	3.9	−1.4
Turnout		3,847	87.4	
Two-party-preferred result
Labor	Len Kiely	1,959	53.0	+12.9
Country Liberal	Peter Poniris	1,738	47.0	−12.9
Labor gain from Country Liberal		Swing	+12.9	

=== Stuart ===
2001 Northern Territory general election: Stuart
Party	Candidate	Votes	%	±%
Labor	Peter Toyne	1,453	71.3	+20.4
Country Liberal	Ken Lechleitner	586	28.7	−20.4
Total formal votes		2,039	95.4	+2.0
Informal votes		98	4.6	−2.0
Turnout		2,137	58.0	
Labor hold		Swing	+20.4	

=== Wanguri ===
2001 Northern Territory general election: Wanguri
Party	Candidate	Votes	%	±%
Labor	Paul Henderson	2,000	55.3	+12.4
Country Liberal	Robyn Cahill	1,498	41.4	−10.1
Socialist Alliance	Meredith De Landelles	121	3.3	+3.3
Total formal votes		3,619	97.1	+1.7
Informal votes		109	2.9	−1.7
Turnout		3,728	91.1	
Two-party-preferred result
Labor	Paul Henderson	2,070	57.2	+11.0
Country Liberal	Robyn Cahill	1,549	42.8	−11.0
Labor hold		Swing	+11.0	

== See also ==
- 2001 Northern Territory general election
