= Electoral results for the division of Millner =

This is a list of electoral results for the Electoral division of Millner in Northern Territory elections.

== Members for Millner ==
Member	Party	Term
Roger Ryan	Country Liberal	1974–1977
Jon Isaacs	Labor	1977–1981
Terry Smith	Labor	1981–1991
Ken Parish	Labor	1991–1994
Phil Mitchell	Country Liberal	1994–2001
Matthew Bonson	Labor	2001–2008

== Election results ==
=== Elections in the 1970s ===
1974 Northern Territory general election: Millner
Party	Candidate	Votes	%	±%
Country Liberal	Roger Ryan	711	45.4	
Labor	Jack Hunt	425	27.1	
Independent	William Forrest; John Quinn	430	27.5	
Total formal votes		1,566	95.3	
Informal votes		77	4.7	
Turnout		1,643	79.0	
Two-party-preferred result
Country Liberal	Roger Ryan	946	64.3	
Labor	Jack Hunt	526	35.7	
Country Liberal win		(new seat)		

- The number of votes each individual Independent received is unknown.

1977 Northern Territory general election: Millner
Party	Candidate	Votes	%	±%
Labor	Jon Isaacs	951	57.6	
Country Liberal	Roger Ryan	548	33.2	
Progress	Elva Pearce	151	9.2	
Total formal votes		1,650	98.0	
Informal votes		34	2.0	
Turnout		1,684	81.6	
Labor gain from Country Liberal		Swing		

- Preferences were not distributed.

=== Elections in the 1980s ===
1980 Northern Territory general election: Millner
Party	Candidate	Votes	%	±%
Labor	Jon Isaacs	1,020	51.8	−5.8
Country Liberal	John Robinson	949	48.2	+15.0
Total formal votes		1,969	97.0	
Informal votes		60	3.0	
Turnout		2,029	84.8	
Labor hold		Swing	N/A	

1981 Millner by-election
Party	Candidate	Votes	%	±%
Labor	Terry Smith	822	46.9	−4.9
Country Liberal	John Robinson	703	40.1	−8.1
Democrats	Rosemary Harris	120	10.4	+10.4
Independent	Peter Lawrence	35	2.0	+2.0
Independent	William Harding	12	0.7	+0.7
Total formal votes		1,754	96.9	−0.1
Informal votes		56	3.1	+0.1
Turnout		1,810	75.6	−9.2
Two-party-preferred result
Labor	Terry Smith	950	54.2	+2.4
Country Liberal	John Robinson	804	45.8	−2.4
Labor hold		Swing	+2.4	

1983 Northern Territory general election: Millner
Party	Candidate	Votes	%	±%
Labor	Terry Smith	1,130	52.5	
Country Liberal	Lorraine Palfy	934	43.8	
Independent	Christopher Fenner	79	3.7	
Total formal votes		2,152	98.4	
Informal votes		36	1.6	
Turnout		2,188	85.7	
Two-party-preferred result
Labor	Terry Smith	1,171	54.4	
Country Liberal	Lorraine Palfy	981	45.6	
Labor hold		Swing		

1987 Northern Territory general election: Millner
Party	Candidate	Votes	%	±%
Labor	Terry Smith	1,293	61.9	+9.4
Country Liberal	John Baban	533	25.5	−18.3
NT Nationals	Michael Foley	263	12.9	+12.9
Total formal votes		2,089	97.0	
Informal votes		65	3.0	
Turnout		2,154	72.3	
Two-party-preferred result
Labor	Terry Smith	1,363	65.2	+13.2
Country Liberal	John Baban	726	34.8	−13.2
Labor hold		Swing	+13.2	

=== Elections in the 1990s ===
1990 Northern Territory general election: Millner
Party	Candidate	Votes	%	±%
Labor	Terry Smith	1,570	56.7	
Country Liberal	Janice Collins	1,198	43.3	
Total formal votes		2,768	96.7	
Informal votes		93	3.3	
Turnout		2,861	84.7	
Labor hold		Swing	−1.9	

1991 Millner by-election
Party	Candidate	Votes	%	±%
Labor	Ken Parish	1,266	51.1	−5.6
Country Liberal	Janice Collins	561	22.7	−20.6
Independent	Colin Firmin	361	14.6	+14.6
Independent	Peter Byers	288	11.6	+11.6
Total formal votes		2,476	95.8	−0.9
Informal votes		109	4.2	+0.9
Turnout		2,585	70.4	−14.3
Labor hold		Swing		

1994 Northern Territory general election: Millner
Party	Candidate	Votes	%	±%
Country Liberal	Phil Mitchell	1,445	47.0	+3.7
Labor	Ken Parish	1,305	42.4	−14.3
Greens	Ilana Eldridge	325	10.6	+10.6
Total formal votes		3,075	96.4	
Informal votes		114	3.6	
Turnout		3,189	82.9	
Two-party-preferred result
Country Liberal	Phil Mitchell	1,574	51.2	+7.9
Labor	Ken Parish	1,501	48.8	−7.9
Country Liberal gain from Labor		Swing	+7.9	

1997 Northern Territory general election: Millner
Party	Candidate	Votes	%	±%
Country Liberal	Phil Mitchell	1,782	53.8	+6.8
Labor	Peter O'Hagan	1,133	34.2	−8.2
Greens	June Mills	212	6.4	+6.4
Independent	Ian Mills	187	5.6	+5.6
Total formal votes		3,314	94.8	
Informal votes		183	5.2	
Turnout		3,497	78.2	
Two-party-preferred result
Country Liberal	Phil Mitchell	1,945	58.7	+7.8
Labor	Peter O'Hagan	1,369	41.3	−7.8
Country Liberal hold		Swing	+7.8	

=== Elections in the 2000s ===
2001 Northern Territory general election: Millner
Party	Candidate	Votes	%	±%
Country Liberal	Phil Mitchell	1,633	46.0	−7.8
Labor	Matthew Bonson	1,571	44.2	+10.1
Independent	Diane Baird	168	4.7	+4.7
Independent	Andrew Arthur	116	3.3	+3.3
Territory Alliance	Andrew Ivinson	64	1.8	+1.8
Total formal votes		3,552	94.6	−0.2
Informal votes		202	5.4	+0.2
Turnout		3,754	83.5	
Two-party-preferred result
Labor	Matthew Bonson	1,817	51.2	+9.9
Country Liberal	Phil Mitchell	1,735	48.8	−9.9
Labor gain from Country Liberal		Swing	+9.9	

2005 Northern Territory general election: Millner
Party	Candidate	Votes	%	±%
Labor	Matthew Bonson	1,888	52.7	+8.5
Independent	Phil Mitchell	758	21.2	+21.2
Country Liberal	Paul Mossman	598	16.7	−29.3
Greens	Rob Hoad	293	8.2	+8.2
Independent	Rob Inder-Smith	45	1.3	+1.3
Total formal votes		3,582	97.2	+2.6
Informal votes		102	2.8	−2.6
Turnout		3,684	83.1	
Two-party-preferred result
Labor	Matthew Bonson	2,429	67.8	+16.7
Country Liberal	Paul Mossman	1,153	32.2	−16.7
Two-candidate-preferred result
Labor	Matthew Bonson	2,250	62.8	+11.6
Independent	Phil Mitchell	1,332	37.2	+37.2
Labor hold		Swing	N/A	
