= Electoral results for the division of Casuarina =

This is a list of electoral results for the Electoral division of Casuarina in Northern Territory elections.

== Members for Casuarina ==
Member	Party	Term
Nick Dondas	Country Liberal	1974–1994
Peter Adamson	Country Liberal	1994–2001
Kon Vatskalis	Labor	2001–2014
Lauren Moss	Labor	2014–present

== Election results ==
=== Elections in the 1970s ===
1974 Northern Territory general election: Casuarina
Party	Candidate	Votes	%	±%
Country Liberal	Nick Dondas	931	41.9	N/A
Labor	Allan Dunstan	692	34.9	N/A
Independent	Robert McGahey; Dudley Orr	459	23.2	N/A
Total formal votes		1,982	96.5	N/A
Informal votes		72	3.5	N/A
Turnout		2,082	89.0	N/A
Two-party-preferred result
Country Liberal	Nick Dondas	994	53.5	N/A
Labor	Allan Dunstan	865	46.5	N/A
Country Liberal win		(new seat)		

- Totals for individual Independent candidates not known

1977 Northern Territory general election: Casuarina
Party	Candidate	Votes	%	±%
Labor	Dennis Bree	941	46.7	+11.1
Country Liberal	Nick Dondas	927	46.0	+4.8
Progress	Robert Hoey	149	7.4	+7.4
Total formal votes		2,017	98.2	N/A
Informal votes		38	1.8	N/A
Turnout		2,055	84.2	N/A
Two-party-preferred result
Country Liberal	Nick Dondas	1,022	50.7	−2.8
Labor	Dennis Bree	995	49.3	+2.8
Country Liberal hold		Swing		

=== Elections in the 1980s ===
1980 Northern Territory general election: Casuarina
Party	Candidate	Votes	%	±%
Country Liberal	Nick Dondas	1,696	56.2	+10.2
Labor	Dennis Bree	1,167	38.7	−8.0
Democrats	Klaus Roth	156	5.2	+5.2
Total formal votes		3,019	98.4	N/A
Informal votes		48	1.6	N/A
Turnout		3,067	81.8	N/A
Country Liberal hold		Swing	N/A	

- Preferences were not distributed.

1983 Northern Territory general election: Casuarina
Party	Candidate	Votes	%	±%
Country Liberal	Nick Dondas	1,449	65.4	+9.2
Labor	Lionel Crompton	765	34.6	−4.1
Total formal votes		2,214	97.6	N/A
Informal votes		54	2.4	N/A
Turnout		2,268	91.4	N/A
Country Liberal hold		Swing		

1987 Northern Territory general election: Casuarina
Party	Candidate	Votes	%	±%
Country Liberal	Nick Dondas	1,109	44.3	−21.1
Labor	John Reeves	1,053	42.0	+7.4
NT Nationals	Giuseppe Nicolosi	343	13.7	+13.7
Total formal votes		2,505	96.8	N/A
Informal votes		83	3.2	N/A
Turnout		2,588	81.5	N/A
Two-party-preferred result
Country Liberal	Nick Dondas	1,353	54.0	−11.0
Labor	John Reeves	1,152	46.0	+11.0
Country Liberal hold		Swing	−11.0	

=== Elections in the 1990s ===
1990 Northern Territory general election: Casuarina
Party	Candidate	Votes	%	±%
Country Liberal	Nick Dondas	1,571	56.1	+11.8
Labor	Rod Ellis	1,029	36.8	−5.2
NT Nationals	Lea Rosenwax	200	7.1	−6.6
Total formal votes		2,800	97.5	N/A
Informal votes		71	2.5	N/A
Turnout		2,871	89.5	N/A
Two-party-preferred result
Country Liberal	Nick Dondas	1,721	61.5	+7.5
Labor	Rod Ellis	1,079	38.5	−7.5
Country Liberal hold		Swing	+7.5	

1994 Northern Territory general election: Casuarina
Party	Candidate	Votes	%	±%
Country Liberal	Peter Adamson	1,650	55.4	−0.7
Labor	Clare Martin	1,328	44.6	+7.8
Total formal votes		2,978	96.1	N/A
Informal votes		119	3.9	N/A
Turnout		3,097	87.3	N/A
Country Liberal hold		Swing	−6.1	

1997 Northern Territory general election: Casuarina
Party	Candidate	Votes	%	±%
Country Liberal	Peter Adamson	1,828	56.7	+1.3
Labor	Douglas McLeod	1,226	38.0	−6.6
Independent	Timothy Stewart	169	5.2	+5.2
Total formal votes		3,223	96.0	N/A
Informal votes		134	4.0	N/A
Turnout		3,357	82.1	N/A
Two-party-preferred result
Country Liberal	Peter Adamson	1,869	58.0	+3.0
Labor	Douglas McLeod	1,354	42.0	−3.0
Country Liberal hold		Swing	+3.0	

=== Elections in the 2000s ===
2001 Northern Territory general election: Casuarina
Party	Candidate	Votes	%	±%
Labor	Kon Vatskalis	1,723	48.5	+7.2
Country Liberal	Peter Adamson	1,510	42.5	−12.1
Democrats	Craig Seiler	251	7.1	+7.1
Territory Alliance	Necmi Bayram	66	1.9	+1.9
Total formal votes		3,550	96.9	N/A
Informal votes		112	3.1	N/A
Turnout		3,662	88.4	N/A
Two-party-preferred result
Labor	Kon Vatskalis	1,900	53.5	+9.1
Country Liberal	Peter Adamson	1,650	46.5	−9.1
Labor gain from Country Liberal		Swing	+9.1	

2005 Northern Territory general election: Casuarina
Party	Candidate	Votes	%	±%
Labor	Kon Vatskalis	2,361	66.1	+17.5
Country Liberal	Wendy Green	992	27.8	−14.8
Independent	Gary Mills	126	3.5	+3.5
Independent	Scott White	94	2.6	+2.6
Total formal votes		3,573	97.4	N/A
Informal votes		95	2.6	N/A
Turnout		3,668	86.6	N/A
Two-party-preferred result
Labor	Kon Vatskalis	2,466	69.0	+15.5
Country Liberal	Wendy Green	1,107	31.0	−15.5
Labor hold		Swing	+15.5	

2008 Northern Territory general election: Casuarina
Party	Candidate	Votes	%	±%
Labor	Kon Vatskalis	2,397	64.2	−4.2
Country Liberal	Gary Haslett	1,339	35.8	+4.2
Total formal votes		3,736	94.9	N/A
Informal votes		199	5.1	N/A
Turnout		3,935	84.1	N/A
Labor hold		Swing	−4.2	

=== Elections in the 2010s ===
2012 Northern Territory general election: Casuarina
Party	Candidate	Votes	%	±%
Labor	Kon Vatskalis	2,512	59.3	−4.9
Country Liberal	Jane Jackson	1,724	40.7	+4.9
Total formal votes		4,236	97.9	N/A
Informal votes		89	2.1	N/A
Turnout		4,325	86.0	N/A
Labor hold		Swing	−4.9	

Casuarina by-election, 18 October 2014
Party	Candidate	Votes	%	±%
Labor	Lauren Moss	1,579	42.1	−17.2
Country Liberal	Harry Kypreos	1,525	40.6	−0.1
Greens	Michael Conrad	412	11.0	+11.0
Independent	George Mamouzellos	99	2.6	+2.6
Independent	Trevor Jenkins	78	2.1	+2.1
Independent	Jack Henderson	36	1.0	+1.0
Citizens Electoral Council	Trudy Campbell	25	0.7	+0.7
Total formal votes		3,754	96.6	−1.4
Informal votes		133	3.4	+1.4
Turnout		3,887	70.9	−15.0
Two-party-preferred result
Labor	Lauren Moss	2,072	55.2	−4.1
Country Liberal	Harry Kypreos	1,682	44.8	+4.1
Labor hold		Swing	−4.1	

2016 Northern Territory general election: Casuarina
Party	Candidate	Votes	%	±%
Labor	Lauren Moss	2,688	61.3	+2.5
Country Liberal	Giovanna Webb	1,694	38.7	−2.5
Total formal votes		4,382	97.4	N/A
Informal votes		117	2.6	N/A
Turnout		4,499	82.4	N/A
Labor hold		Swing	+2.5	

=== Elections in the 2020s ===
2020 Northern Territory general election: Casuarina
Party	Candidate	Votes	%	±%
Labor	Lauren Moss	2,307	50.1	−11.0
Country Liberal	Tony Schelling	1,012	22.0	−16.3
Territory Alliance	Danial Kelly	730	15.9	+15.9
Greens	Kendall Trudgen	552	12.0	+11.6
Total formal votes		4,601	97.5	N/A
Informal votes		117	2.5	N/A
Turnout		4,718	83.5	N/A
Two-party-preferred result
Labor	Lauren Moss	3,033	65.9	+4.4
Country Liberal	Tony Schelling	1,568	34.1	−4.4
Labor hold		Swing	+4.4	

2024 Northern Territory general election: Casuarina
Party	Candidate	Votes	%	±%
Country Liberal	Khoda Patel	2,055	44.1	+21.7
Labor	Lauren Moss	1,559	33.4	−17.8
Greens	Pamela McCalman	578	12.4	+1.5
Independent	Martin Jackson	472	10.1	+10.1
Total formal votes		4,664	96.9	−0.5
Informal votes		147	3.1	+0.5
Turnout		4,811	81.5	
Two-party-preferred result
Country Liberal	Khoda Patel	2,365	50.7	+16.7
Labor	Lauren Moss	2,281	49.3	−16.7
Country Liberal gain from Labor		Swing	+16.7	
