= Electoral results for the division of Barkly =

This is a list of electoral results for the Electoral division of Barkly in Northern Territory elections.

== Members for Barkly ==
Member	Party	Term
Ian Tuxworth	Country Liberal Party	1974–1987
Ian Tuxworth	NT Nationals	1987–1990
Maggie Hickey	Labor Party	1990–2001
Elliot McAdam	Labor Party	2001–2008
Gerry McCarthy	Labor Party	2008–2020
Steve Edgington	Country Liberal Party	2020–present

== Election results ==
=== Elections in the 1970s ===
1974 Northern Territory general election: Barkly
Party	Candidate	Votes	%	±%
Country Liberal	Ian Tuxworth	558	53.0	N/A
Labor	Eric Marks	495	47.0	N/A
Total formal votes		1,053	94.5	N/A
Informal votes		61	5.5	N/A
Turnout		1,114	67.7	N/A
Country Liberal win		(new seat)		

1977 Northern Territory general election: Barkly
Party	Candidate	Votes	%	±%
Country Liberal	Ian Tuxworth	603	44.5	−8.5
Labor	Jean Havnen	365	26.9	−20.1
Progress	Neville Andrews	233	17.2	N/A
Independent	Margaret Conway; Billy Foster	154	11.4	N/A
Total formal votes		1,355	94.8	N/A
Informal votes		74	5.2	N/A
Turnout		1,429	68.2	N/A
Two-party-preferred result
Country Liberal	Ian Tuxworth	816	60.2	+7.2
Labor	Jean Havnen	539	39.8	−7.2
Country Liberal hold		Swing		

- The number of votes each independent candidate received is unknown.

=== Elections in the 1980s ===
1980 Northern Territory general election: Barkly
Party	Candidate	Votes	%	±%
Country Liberal	Ian Tuxworth	1,018	54.8	+10.3
Labor	William Thomson	631	33.9	+7.0
Progress	Neville Andrews	210	11.3	−5.9
Total formal votes		1,859	93.0	N/A
Informal votes		140	7.0	N/A
Turnout		1,999	71.1	N/A
Country Liberal hold		Swing		

- Preferences were not distributed.

1983 Northern Territory general election: Barkly
Party	Candidate	Votes	%	±%
Country Liberal	Ian Tuxworth	1,045	60.3	+5.5
Labor	Charles Hallett	688	39.7	+5.8
Total formal votes		1,733	96.3	N/A
Informal votes		67	3.7	N/A
Turnout		1,800	74.2	N/A
Country Liberal hold		Swing		

1987 Northern Territory general election: Barkly
Party	Candidate	Votes	%	±%
NT Nationals	Ian Tuxworth	729	37.9	+37.9
Independent	Maggie Hickey	581	30.2	+30.2
Labor	Keith Hallett	314	16.3	−23.4
Country Liberal	Gary Smith	301	15.6	−44.7
Total formal votes		1,925	94.4	N/A
Informal votes		114	5.6	N/A
Turnout		2,039	65.8	N/A
Two-candidate-preferred result
NT Nationals	Ian Tuxworth	972	50.5	+50.5
Independent	Maggie Hickey	953	49.5	+49.5
NT Nationals gain from Country Liberal		Swing		

- This election was declared void by the Court of Disputed Returns.

1987 Barkly by-election
Party	Candidate	Votes	%	±%
NT Nationals	Ian Tuxworth	1,000	42.0	+42.0
Labor	Maggie Hickey	886	37.2	−2.5
Country Liberal	Malcolm Holt	391	16.4	−43.9
Independent	Kevin Conway	104	4.4	+4.4
Total formal votes		2,381	94.4	N/A
Informal votes		141	5.6	N/A
Turnout		2,522	68.3	N/A
Two-candidate-preferred result
NT Nationals	Ian Tuxworth	1,332	55.9	+55.9
Labor	Maggie Hickey	1,049	44.1	+4.4
NT Nationals gain from Country Liberal		Swing		

- Percentages compared to 1983 election.

=== Elections in the 1990s ===
1990 Northern Territory general election: Barkly
Party	Candidate	Votes	%	±%
Labor	Maggie Hickey	1,062	43.4	+6.2
Country Liberal	Paul Ruger	791	32.4	+16.4
NT Nationals	Kenneth Purvis	464	19.0	–23.0
Independent	Tony Boulter	94	3.8	+3.8
Independent	Charles Hallett	34	1.4	+1.4
Total formal votes		2,445	93.7	N/A
Informal votes		163	6.3	N/A
Turnout		2,608	81.1	N/A
Two-party-preferred result
Labor	Maggie Hickey	1,239	50.7	+6.6
Country Liberal	Paul Ruger	1,206	49.3	+49.3
Labor gain from NT Nationals		Swing	+7.5	

- Percentages compared to 1987 by-election.

1994 Northern Territory general election: Barkly
Party	Candidate	Votes	%	±%
Country Liberal	Paul Ruger	1,358	46.2	+13.8
Labor	Maggie Hickey	1,338	45.5	+2.1
Independent	Geoffrey Freeman	246	8.4	+8.4
Total formal votes		2,942	95.8	N/A
Informal votes		128	4.2	N/A
Turnout		3,070	78.2	N/A
Two-party-preferred result
Labor	Maggie Hickey	1,519	51.6	+0.9
Country Liberal	Paul Ruger	1,423	48.4	–0.9
Labor hold		Swing	+1.1	

1997 Northern Territory general election: Barkly
Party	Candidate	Votes	%	±%
Labor	Maggie Hickey	1,591	56.8	+11.3
Country Liberal	Mark John	1,118	39.9	–6.2
Independent	Barry Nattrass	93	3.3	+3.3
Total formal votes		2,802	94.8	N/A
Informal votes		153	5.2	N/A
Turnout		2,955	74.4	N/A
Two-party-preferred result
Labor	Maggie Hickey	1,625	58.0	+6.4
Country Liberal	Mark John	1,177	42.0	–6.4
Labor hold		Swing	+6.0	

=== Elections in the 2000s ===
2001 Northern Territory general election: Barkly
Party	Candidate	Votes	%	±%
Labor	Elliot McAdam	1,635	56.4	–0.4
Country Liberal	Bill Cross	720	24.8	–15.1
Independent	Gavin Carpenter	543	18.7	+18.7
Total formal votes		2,898	96.5	N/A
Informal votes		106	3.5	N/A
Turnout		3,004	78.4	N/A
Two-party-preferred result
Labor	Elliot McAdam	1,810	62.5	+4.5
Country Liberal	Bill Cross	1,088	37.5	–4.5
Labor hold		Swing	+4.5	

2005 Northern Territory general election: Barkly
Party	Candidate	Votes	%	±%
Labor	Elliot McAdam	2,135	71.4	+13.8
Country Liberal	Val Dyer	767	25.7	+1.2
Independent	Janeen Bulsey	87	2.9	+2.9
Total formal votes		2,989	96.2	N/A
Informal votes		118	3.8	N/A
Turnout		3,107	74.1	N/A
Two-party-preferred result
Labor	Elliot McAdam	2,183	73.0	+9.6
Country Liberal	Val Dyer	806	27.0	–9.6
Labor hold		Swing	+9.6	

2008 Northern Territory general election: Barkly
Party	Candidate	Votes	%	±%
Labor	Gerry McCarthy	1,777	60.9	–10.9
Country Liberal	Mick Adams	801	27.5	+3.2
Independent	Randall Gould	265	9.1	+9.1
Independent	Barry Nattrass	73	2.5	+2.5
Total formal votes		2,916	95.3	N/A
Informal votes		144	4.7	N/A
Turnout		3,060	65.1	N/A
Two-party-preferred result
Labor	Gerry McCarthy	1,914	65.6	–8.6
Country Liberal	Mick Adams	1,002	34.4	+8.6
Labor hold		Swing	–8.6	

=== Elections in the 2010s ===
2012 Northern Territory general election: Barkly
Party	Candidate	Votes	%	±%
Labor	Gerry McCarthy	1,450	45.2	−15.8
Country Liberal	Rebecca Healy	1,162	36.2	+8.7
First Nations	Valda Shannon	467	14.5	+14.5
Independent	Stewart Wiley	131	4.1	+4.1
Total formal votes		3,210	96.3	N/A
Informal votes		122	3.7	N/A
Turnout		3,332	64.9	N/A
Two-party-preferred result
Labor	Gerry McCarthy	1,849	57.6	−8.0
Country Liberal	Rebecca Healy	1,485	42.4	+8.0
Labor hold		Swing	−8.0	

2016 Northern Territory general election: Barkly
Party	Candidate	Votes	%	±%
Labor	Gerry McCarthy	1,387	43.1	−2.0
Independent	Elliot McAdam	869	27.1	+27.1
Country Liberal	Tony Jack	595	18.5	−17.7
Independent	Jack Green	367	11.4	+11.4
Total formal votes		3,218	98.4	N/A
Informal votes		53	1.6	N/A
Turnout		3,271	63.1	N/A
Two-party-preferred result
Labor	Gerry McCarthy	1,864	62.2	+4.7
Country Liberal	Tony Jack	1,132	37.8	−4.7
Two-candidate-preferred result
Labor	Gerry McCarthy	1,739	58.0	+0.4
Independent	Elliot McAdam	1,260	42.0	+42.0
Labor hold		Swing	N/A	

=== Elections in the 2020s ===
2020 Northern Territory general election: Barkly
Party	Candidate	Votes	%	±%
Country Liberal	Steve Edgington	1,431	41.6	+24.6
Labor	Sid Vashist	1,238	36.0	−12.6
Independent	Gadrian Hoosan	663	19.3	+19.3
Independent	Daniel Mulholland	109	3.2	+3.2
Total formal votes		3,441	95.7	N/A
Informal votes		156	4.3	N/A
Turnout		3,597	63.2	N/A
Two-party-preferred result
Country Liberal	Steve Edgington	1,723	50.1	+15.9
Labor	Sid Vashist	1,718	49.9	−15.9
Country Liberal gain from Labor		Swing	+15.9	

2024 Northern Territory general election: Barkly
Party	Candidate	Votes	%	±%
Country Liberal	Steve Edgington	1,571	51.9	+10.9
Labor	Lizzie Hogan	1,454	48.1	+10.0
Total formal votes		3,017	97.6	+1.9
Informal votes		75	2.4	−1.9
Turnout		3,100	50.7	
Country Liberal hold		Swing	+1.7	
