= Members of the Northern Territory Legislative Assembly, 1990–1994 =

This is a list of members of the Northern Territory Legislative Assembly from 1987 to 1990.

Name	Party	Electorate	Years in office
John Bailey	Labor	Wanguri	1989–1999
Neil Bell	Labor	MacDonnell	1981–1997
Gary Cartwright	Labor	Victoria River	1990–1994
Denis Collins	Independent	Greatorex	1980–1994
Hon Barry Coulter	CLP	Palmerston	1983–1999
Hon Nick Dondas	CLP	Casuarina	1974–1994
Brian Ede	Labor	Stuart	1983–1996
Hon Fred Finch	CLP	Leanyer	1983–1997
Hon Stephen Hatton	CLP	Nightcliff	1983–2001
Maggie Hickey	Labor	Barkly	1990–2001
Wes Lanhupuy	Labor	Arnhem	1983–1995
Hon Daryl Manzie	CLP	Sanderson	1983–2001
Hon Terry McCarthy	CLP	Goyder	1983–2001
Max Ortmann	CLP/Independent ^{[3]}	Brennan	1990–1994
Noel Padgham-Purich	Independent	Nelson	1977–1997
Mick Palmer	CLP	Karama	1983–2001
Ken Parish ^{[1]}	Labor	Millner	1991–1994
Hon Marshall Perron	CLP	Fannie Bay	1974–1995
Hon Eric Poole	CLP	Araluen	1986–2001
Hon Mike Reed	CLP	Katherine	1987–2003
Maurice Rioli ^{[2]}	Labor	Arafura	1992–2001
Rick Setter	CLP	Jingili	1984–1997
Terry Smith ^{[1]}	Labor	Millner	1981–1991
Syd Stirling	Labor	Nhulunbuy	1990–2008
Hon Shane Stone	CLP	Port Darwin	1990–2000
Stan Tipiloura ^{[2]}	Labor	Arafura	1987–1992
Hon Roger Vale	CLP	Braitling	1974–1994

^{1} Millner Labor MLA Terry Smith resigned on 21 November 1991. Labor candidate Ken Parish won the resulting by-election on 7 December.
^{2} Arafura Labor MLA Stan Tipiloura died on 20 September 1992. Labor candidate Maurice Rioli won the resulting by-election on 7 November.
^{3} Brennan CLP MLA Max Ortmann lost preselection prior to the 1994 election and became an independent.

== See also ==
- 1990 Northern Territory general election
