= Electoral results for the division of Nelson (Northern Territory) =

This is a list of electoral results for the Electoral division of Nelson in Northern Territory elections.

== Members for Nelson ==
Member	Party	Term
Noel Padgham-Purich	Independent	1990–1997
Chris Lugg	Country Liberal	1997–2001
Gerry Wood	Independent	2001–2020
Gerard Maley	Country Liberal	2020–present

== Election results ==
=== Elections in the 1990s ===
1990 Northern Territory general election: Nelson
Party	Candidate	Votes	%	±%
Independent	Noel Padgham-Purich	1,207	41.0	N/A
Country Liberal	David Sanderson	965	32.8	N/A
Labor	Peter Ivinson	589	20.0	N/A
NT Nationals	Graeme Gow	181	6.2	N/A
Total formal votes		2,942	98.3	N/A
Informal votes		52	1.7	N/A
Turnout		2,994	89.9	N/A
Two-party-preferred result
Country Liberal	David Sanderson	2,173	73.9	N/A
Labor	Peter Ivinson	769	26.1	N/A
Two-candidate-preferred result
Independent	Noel Padgham-Purich	1,873	63.7	N/A
Country Liberal	David Sanderson	1,069	36.3	N/A
Independent win		(new seat)		

1994 Northern Territory general election: Nelson
Party	Candidate	Votes	%	±%
Country Liberal	Chris Lugg	1,528	43.7	+23.7
Independent	Noel Padgham-Purich	1,102	31.5	−9.5
Labor	Wayne Connop	864	24.7	−8.1
Total formal votes		3,494	97.9	N/A
Informal votes		76	2.1	N/A
Turnout		3,570	89.1	N/A
Two-party-preferred result
Country Liberal	Chris Lugg	1,574	66.6	−7.3
Labor	Wayne Connop	1,501	33.4	+7.3
Two-candidate-preferred result
Independent	Noel Padgham-Purich	1,855	53.1	−10.6
Country Liberal	Chris Lugg	1,639	46.9	+10.6
Independent hold		Swing	N/A	

1997 Northern Territory general election: Nelson
Party	Candidate	Votes	%	±%
Country Liberal	Chris Lugg	1,461	44.5	+0.8
Independent	Dave Tollner	1,174	35.8	+35.8
Labor	Theresa Francis	646	19.7	−5.0
Total formal votes		3,281	96.6	N/A
Informal votes		116	3.4	N/A
Turnout		3,397	87.8	N/A
Two-party-preferred result
Country Liberal	Chris Lugg	2,122	64.7	+7.8
Labor	Theresa Francis	1,159	35.3	−7.8
Two-candidate-preferred result
Country Liberal	Chris Lugg	1,661	50.6	+3.7
Independent	Dave Tollner	1,620	49.4	+49.4
Country Liberal gain from Independent		Swing	+3.7	

=== Elections in the 2000s ===
2001 Northern Territory general election: Nelson
Party	Candidate	Votes	%	±%
Country Liberal	Chris Lugg	1,535	43.5	−1.0
Independent	Gerry Wood	1,461	41.4	+41.4
Labor	Bob Hare	343	9.7	−10.0
One Nation	Tony Hardwick	186	5.3	+5.3
Total formal votes		3,525	97.3	N/A
Informal votes		99	2.7	N/A
Turnout		3,624	89.5	N/A
Two-party-preferred result
Country Liberal	Chris Lugg	2,321	65.8	+1.1
Labor	Bob Hare	1,204	34.2	−1.1
Two-candidate-preferred result
Independent	Gerry Wood	1,859	52.7	+52.7
Country Liberal	Chris Lugg	1,666	47.3	−17.4
Independent gain from Country Liberal		Swing	N/A	

2005 Northern Territory general election: Nelson
Party	Candidate	Votes	%	±%
Independent	Gerry Wood	2,133	56.6	+23.4
Country Liberal	Chris Lugg	1,163	30.8	−16.5
Labor	Lisa McKinney-Smith	475	12.6	−1.0
Total formal votes		3,771	97.7	N/A
Informal votes		89	2.3	N/A
Turnout		3,860	83.4	N/A
Two-party-preferred result
Country Liberal	Chris Lugg	2,253	59.7	−6.0
Labor	Lisa McKinney-Smith	1,518	40.3	+6.0
Two-candidate-preferred result
Independent	Gerry Wood	2,496	66.2	+15.1
Country Liberal	Chris Lugg	1,275	33.8	−15.1
Independent hold		Swing	+15.1	

2008 Northern Territory general election: Nelson
Party	Candidate	Votes	%	±%
Independent	Gerry Wood	2,436	72.2	+15.0
Country Liberal	Maureen Kohlman	646	19.1	−11.5
Labor	Justine Luders-Searle	292	8.7	−3.5
Total formal votes		3,374	97.6	N/A
Informal votes		82	2.4	N/A
Turnout		3,456	74.6	N/A
Two-party-preferred result
Country Liberal	Maureen Kohlman	2,313	68.6	+8.7
Labor	Justine Luders-Searle	1,061	31.4	−8.7
Two-candidate-preferred result
Independent	Gerry Wood	2,654	78.7	+12.1
Country Liberal	Maureen Kohlman	720	21.3	−12.1
Independent hold		Swing	+12.1	

=== Elections in the 2010s ===
2012 Northern Territory general election: Nelson
Party	Candidate	Votes	%	±%
Independent	Gerry Wood	1,988	54.0	−18.2
Country Liberal	Judy Cole	1,436	39.0	+19.9
Labor	Sharon McAlear	255	6.9	−1.7
Total formal votes		3,679	98.1	N/A
Informal votes		72	1.9	N/A
Turnout		3,751	79.6	N/A
Two-party-preferred result
Country Liberal	Judy Cole	2,477	67.3	−1.3
Labor	Sharon McAlear	1,203	32.7	+1.3
Two-candidate-preferred result
Independent	Gerry Wood	2,177	59.2	−19.5
Country Liberal	Judy Cole	1,502	40.8	+19.5
Independent hold		Swing	−19.5	

2016 Northern Territory general election: Nelson
Party	Candidate	Votes	%	±%
Independent	Gerry Wood	2,804	60.5	+11.5
Country Liberal	Gerard Maley	1,029	22.2	−18.7
Labor	Kirsty Hunt	510	11.0	+1.9
Shooters and Fishers	Marty Reinhold	245	5.3	+5.3
Citizens Electoral Council	Brigid McCullough	47	1.0	+1.0
Total formal votes		4,635	98.7	N/A
Informal votes		61	1.3	N/A
Turnout		4,696	80.4	N/A
Two-party-preferred result
Country Liberal	Gerard Maley	1,803	57.0	−10.1
Labor	Kirsty Hunt	1,360	43.0	+10.1
Two-candidate-preferred result
Independent	Gerry Wood	3,209	73.0	+17.5
Country Liberal	Gerard Maley	1,189	27.0	−17.5
Independent hold		Swing	+17.5	

=== Elections in the 2020s ===
2020 Northern Territory general election: Nelson
Party	Candidate	Votes	%	±%
Country Liberal	Gerard Maley	2,302	50.5	+28.3
Independent	Beverley Ratahi	1,351	29.6	+29.6
Labor	Steve Asher	488	10.7	−0.3
Territory Alliance	Andy Harley	420	9.2	+9.2
Total formal votes		4,561	96.9	N/A
Informal votes		146	3.1	N/A
Turnout		4,707	85.5	N/A
Two-party-preferred result (Note: Estimated two-party count by Antony Green.)
Country Liberal	Gerard Maley	3,320	72.8	+15.8
Labor	Steve Asher	1,241	27.2	−15.8
Two-candidate-preferred result
Country Liberal	Gerard Maley	2,657	58.3	+31.2
Independent	Beverley Ratahi	1,904	41.7	+41.7
Country Liberal gain from Independent		Swing	+31.2	

2024 Northern Territory general election: Nelson
Party	Candidate	Votes	%	±%
Country Liberal	Gerard Maley	3,653	71.6	+20.6
Independent	Beverley Ratahi	743	14.5	−13.3
Labor	Anthony Venes	708	13.9	+1.9
Total formal votes		5,104	97.2	+0.3
Informal votes		146	2.8	−0.3
Turnout		5,250	82.3	
Two-party-preferred result (Note: Estimated two-party count by Antony Green.)
Country Liberal	Gerard Maley	4,057	79.5	+7.2
Labor	Anthony Venes	1,047	20.5	−7.2
Two-candidate-preferred result
Country Liberal	Gerard Maley	3,949	77.4	+5.1
Independent	Beverley Ratahi	1,155	22.6	−5.1
Country Liberal hold		Swing	+5.1	
