= Roger Ryan =

Roger Ryan may refer to:

- Roger Ryan (hurler)
- Roger Ryan (politician)
