= 1991 Millner by-election =

7 December 1991

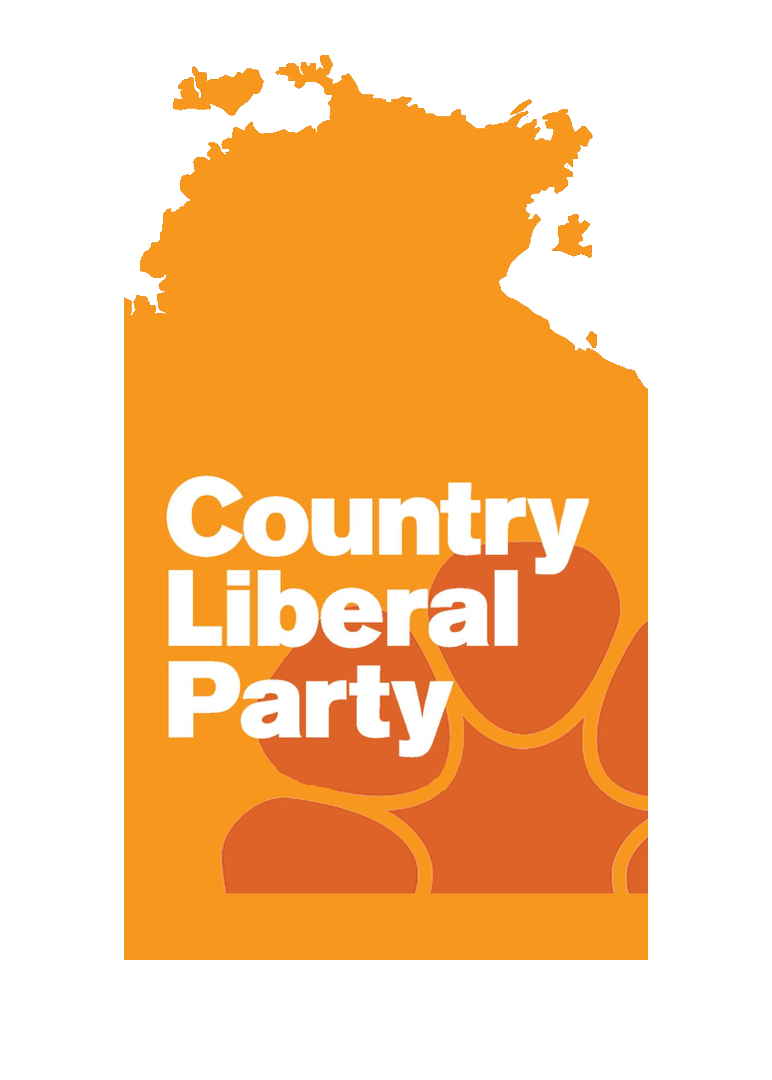
	First party	Second party
Candidate	Ken Parish	Janice Collins
Party	Labor	Country Liberal
Popular vote	1,256	561
Percentage	51.1%	22.7%
Swing	▼5.6	▼20.6
	Third party	Fourth party
	IND	IND
Candidate	Colin Firmin	Peter Byrnes
Party	Independent	Independent
Popular vote	361	288
Percentage	14.6%	11.6
Swing	▲14.6	▲11.6
MP before election
Terry Smith
Labor
Elected MP
Ken Parish
Labor

A by-election for the seat of Millner in the Northern Territory Legislative Assembly was held on 7 December 1991. The by-election was triggered by the resignation of Labor member and Leader of the Opposition Terry Smith. The seat had been held by Smith since a previous by-election in 1981.

== Results ==
Millner by-election, 1991
Party	Candidate	Votes	%	±%
Labor	Ken Parish	1,266	51.1	−5.6
Country Liberal	Janice Collins	561	22.7	−20.6
Independent	Colin Firmin	361	14.6	+14.6
Independent	Peter Byers	288	11.6	+11.6
Total formal votes		2,476	95.8	−0.9
Informal votes		109	4.2	+0.9
Turnout		2,585	70.4	−14.3
Labor hold		Swing		
