= 2001 Northern Territory general election =

- 18 August 2001

All 25 seats of the Northern Territory Legislative Assembly 13 seats needed for a majority
- Turnout: 80.56 (▲1.57 pp)
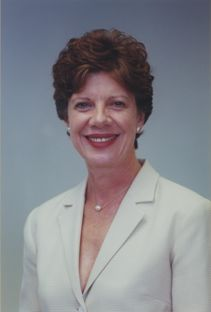

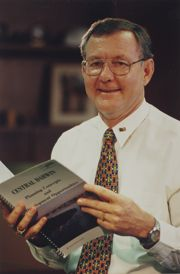
	First party	Second party
Leader	Clare Martin	Denis Burke
Party	Labor	Country Liberal
Leader since	3 February 1999	8 February 1999
Leader's seat	Fannie Bay	Brennan
Last election	7 seats	18 seats
Seats won	13	10
Seat change	▲6	▼8
Popular vote	33,038	36,926
Percentage	40.6%	45.4%
Swing	▲2.1	▼9.1
TPP	48.1%	51.9%
TPP	▲6.0	▼6.0
Chief Minister before election
Denis Burke
Country Liberal
Elected Chief Minister
Clare Martin
Labor

A general election was held in the Northern Territory, Australia, on 18 August 2001. The centre-left Labor Party (ALP), led by Clare Martin, won a surprising victory over the Country Liberal Party (CLP). Before this, the CLP had held 18 out the 25 seats in the Northern Territory Legislative Assembly to the ALP's 7. After this election, the ALP held the majority with 13 seats to the CLP's 10, consigning the CLP to opposition for the first time since the Territory gained responsible government. Martin became Chief Minister, succeeding the CLP's Denis Burke.

While the CLP won a bare majority of the two-party vote, Labor picked up an unexpectedly large swing in the Darwin area. Labor took all but one seat in the capital, including all seven seats in the northern part of the city. Darwin's northern suburbs are somewhat more diverse than the rest of the city, and were on paper friendlier to Labor than the rest of the capital. In the process, Labor unseated four sitting MLAs; Labor had not ousted a sitting CLP member since 1980. The result was not known for several days, in part due to a very close race in Millner between CLP incumbent Phil Mitchell and Labor challenger Matthew Bonson. Ultimately, Bonson won by a margin of 82 votes, allowing Labor to win government by one seat.

Two independents won seats at this election. Former CLP member Loraine Braham won the seat of Braitling and Gerry Wood won the seat of Nelson.

== Retiring MPs ==
=== ALP ===
- Maggie Hickey MLA (Barkly)
- Maurice Rioli MLA (Arafura)

=== CLP ===
- Stephen Hatton MLA (Nightcliff)
- Daryl Manzie MLA (Sanderson)
- Terry McCarthy MLA (Goyder)
- Eric Poole MLA (Araluen)

== Results ==
↓
13	2	10
ALP	Ind	CLP

Summary of the Results of the 2001 Northern Territory general election, Legislative Assembly
Party	Votes	%	+/–	Seats	+/–
Country Liberal	36,926	45.38	▼9.29	10	-8
Labor	33,038	40.60	▲2.12	13	+6
Independents	8,583	10.55	▲4.88	2	+2
One Nation	1,074	1.32	New	0	±0
Democrats	692	0.85	▲0.22	0	±0
Territory Alliance (2001)	622	0.76	New	0	±0
Socialist Alliance	432	0.53	New	0	±0
Total	81,367	100.00	–	25	–
Valid votes	81,367	95.73			
Invalid/blank votes	3,627	4.27	-0.90		
Total votes	84,994	100.00	–		
Registered voters/turnout	105,506	80.56	+1.57		
Labor	39,099	48.05			
Country Liberal	42,268	51.95			
Total	81,367	100.00			

Popular vote
Country Liberal	45.38%
Labor	40.60%
One Nation	1.32%
Democrats	0.85%
Others	1.29%
Independents	5.10%

Two-party-preferred vote
Country Liberal	51.90%
Labor	48.10%

Seats
Labor	52.00%
Country Liberal	40.00%
Independents	8.00%

== Candidates ==
Sitting members are listed in bold. Successful candidates are highlighted in the relevant colour.

Electorate	Held by	Labor	CLP	Other
Arafura	Labor	Marion Scrymgour	Marius Puruntatameri	John Christopherson (Ind); Dorothy Fox (Ind)
Araluen	CLP	Michael Bowden	Jodeen Carney	John Bohning (Ind); Meredith Campbell (Ind)
Arnhem	Labor	**Jack Ah Kit**	Cliff Thompson; Alan Wright	Lance Lawrence (Ind)
Barkly	Labor	Elliot McAdam	Bill Cross	Gavin Carpenter (Ind)
Blain	CLP	Peter Shew	**Terry Mills**	Joseph Mulqueeney (TAP)
Braitling	CLP	Peter Brooke	Peter Harvey	**Loraine Braham** (Ind)
Braitling	CLP	Peter Brooke	Peter Harvey	Peter Jarvis (Ind); Eddie Taylor (Ind)
Brennan	Labor	Simon Hall	**Denis Burke**	Duncan Dean (Ind)
Casuarina	CLP	Kon Vatskalis	**Peter Adamson**	Necmi Bayram (TAP); Craig Seiler (Dem)
Daly	CLP	Rob Knight	**Tim Baldwin**	Wayne Norris (ON); Frank Spry (Dem)
Drysdale	CLP	Inger Peirce	**Stephen Dunham**	
Fannie Bay	Labor	**Clare Martin**	Mary Cunningham	Peter Johnston (SA)
Goyder	CLP	Alan Smith	Peter Maley	Diana Rickard (Ind); Merv Stewart (ON)
Greatorex	CLP	Peter Kavanagh	**Richard Lim**	David Mortimer (Ind)
Johnston	CLP	Chris Burns	**Steve Balch**	Joanne Sangster (Dem)
Karama	CLP	Delia Lawrie	**Mick Palmer**	
Katherine	CLP	Michael Peirce	**Mike Reed**	Tony Coutts (Ind); John Donnellan (Ind); Rob Phillips (ON)
Macdonnell	CLP	Harold Furber	Philip Alice	
Macdonnell	CLP	Harold Furber	**John Elferink**	
Millner	CLP	Matthew Bonson	**Phil Mitchell**	Andrew Arthur (Ind); Diane Baird (Ind); Andrew Ivinson (TAP)
Nelson	CLP	Bob Hare	**Chris Lugg**	Tony Hardwick (ON)
Nelson	CLP	Bob Hare	**Chris Lugg**	Gerry Wood (Ind)
Nhulunbuy	Labor	**Syd Stirling**	Peter Manning	Gordon Davey (ON); David Mitchell (Ind)
Nightcliff	CLP	Jane Aagaard	Jason Hatton	Peter Ivinson (TAP); Gary Meyerhoff (SA)
Port Darwin	CLP	Chris Bond	**Sue Carter**	Nick Dondas (Ind)
Sanderson	CLP	Len Kiely	Peter Poniris	Gary Haslett (Ind); Susan Murdoch (TAP)
Stuart	Labor	**Peter Toyne**	Ken Lechleitner	
Wanguri	Labor	**Paul Henderson**	Robyn Cahill	Meredith de Landelles (SA)

== Seats changing hands ==
Seat	Pre-2001			Swing	Post-2001		
Seat	Party	Member	Margin	Swing	Margin	Member	Party
Braitling	Country Liberal	Loraine Braham	15.0 (CLP)	N/A	5.5*	Loraine Braham	Independent
Casuarina	Country Liberal	Peter Adamson	5.6	9.1	3.5	Kon Vatskalis	Labor
Johnston	Country Liberal	Steve Balch	6.3	9.2	2.9	Chris Burns	Labor
Karama	Country Liberal	Mick Palmer	2.6	6.4	3.7	Delia Lawrie	Labor
Macdonnell**	Country Liberal	John Elferink	−1.6	10.1	8.5	John Elferink	Country Liberal
Millner	Country Liberal	Phil Mitchell	8.7	9.9	1.2	Matthew Bonson	Labor
Nelson	Country Liberal	Chris Lugg	14.7	17.4	2.7	Gerry Wood	Independent
Nightcliff	Country Liberal	Stephen Hatton	4.6	11.7	7.1	Jane Aagaard	Labor
Sanderson	Country Liberal	Daryl Manzie	9.9	12.9	3.0	Len Kiely	Labor
Wanguri***	Labor	Paul Henderson	−3.8	11.0	7.2	Paul Henderson	Labor

- Members listed in italics did not contest their seats at this election.
- *Braitling's second figure is CLP vs. Independent.
- **Due to boundary changes, Macdonnell was notionally ALP at the time of this election.
- ***Due to boundary changes, Wanguri were notionally CLP at the time of this election.

== Electoral pendulum ==
The following pendulum is known as the Mackerras pendulum, invented by psephologist Malcolm Mackerras. The pendulum works by lining up all of the seats held in the Legislative Assembly according to the percentage point margin they are held by on a two-party-preferred basis. This is also known as the swing required for the seat to change hands. Given a uniform swing to the opposition or government parties, the number of seats that change hands can be predicted.

=== Pre-election pendulum ===
Incumbent members who have become and remained an independent since the 1997 election are indicated in grey.

Members listed in italics did not re-contest their seat at the election.

Country Liberal seats
Marginal
Nelson	Chris Lugg	CLP	0.6 v IND
Karama	Mick Palmer	CLP	2.6
Wanguri	Paul Henderson	ALP	3.8
Nightcliff	Stephen Hatton	CLP	4.6
Casuarina	Peter Adamson	CLP	5.6
Fairly safe
Johnston	Steve Balch	CLP	6.3
Millner	Phil Mitchell	CLP	8.7
Sanderson	Daryl Manzie	CLP	9.9
Safe
Greatorex	Richard Lim	CLP	11.3
Goyder	Terry McCarthy	CLP	13.7
Daly	Terry McCarthy	CLP	14.3
Braitling	Loraine Braham	CLP	15.0
Port Darwin	Sue Carter	CLP	17.2
Araluen	Eric Poole	CLP	19.1
Very safe
Drysdale	Stephen Dunham	CLP	21.8
Blain	Terry Mills	CLP	24.1
Katherine	Mike Reed	CLP	24.3
Brennan	Denis Burke	CLP	25.0

Labor seats
Marginal
Stuart	Peter Toyne	ALP	0.8
Macdonnell	John Elferink	CLP	1.6
Fannie Bay	Clare Martin	ALP	1.9
Fairly safe
Arafura	Maurice Rioli	ALP	9.0
Arnhem	Jack Ah Kit	ALP	7.7
Barkly	Maggie Hickey	ALP	8.0
Safe
Very safe
Nhulunbuy	Syd Stirling	ALP	22.1

=== Post-election pendulum ===
Labor seats
Marginal
Millner	Matthew Bonson	ALP	1.2
Johnston	Chris Burns	ALP	2.9
Sanderson	Len Kiely	ALP	3.0
Casuarina	Kon Vatskalis	ALP	3.5
Karama	Delia Lawrie	ALP	3.7
Fairly safe
Nightcliff	Jane Aagaard	ALP	7.1
Wanguri	Paul Henderson	ALP	7.2
Safe
Fannie Bay	Clare Martin	ALP	11.1
Arnhem	Jack Ah Kit	ALP	11.4
Arafura	Marion Scrymgour	ALP	11.5 v IND
Barkly	Elliot McAdam	ALP	12.5
Nhulunbuy	Syd Stirling	ALP	16.1
Very safe
Stuart	Peter Toyne	ALP	21.3

Country Liberal seats
Marginal
Araluen	Jodeen Carney	CLP	2.0
Fairly safe
Port Darwin	Sue Carter	CLP	6.9
Macdonnell	John Elferink	CLP	8.5
Greatorex	Richard Lim	CLP	9.0
Safe
Daly	Tim Baldwin	CLP	11.8
Goyder	Peter Maley	CLP	13.8
Katherine	Mike Reed	CLP	14.5
Drysdale	Stephen Dunham	CLP	15.4
Blain	Terry Mills	CLP	16.7
Brennan	Denis Burke	CLP	18.2
Independent seats
Nelson	Gerry Wood	IND	2.7 v CLP
Braitling	Loraine Braham	IND	5.5 v CLP
