= 1981 Millner by-election =

21 November 1981

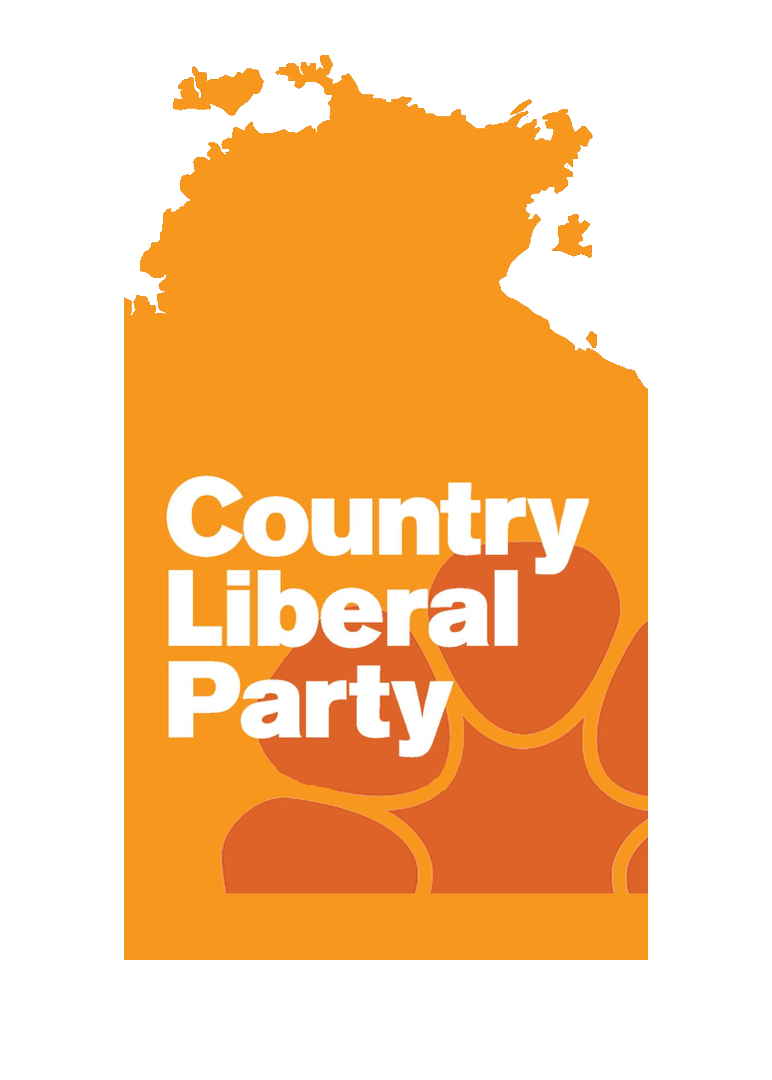
	First party	Second party	Third party
			DEM
Candidate	Terry Smith	John Robinson	Rosemary Harris
Party	Labor	Country Liberal	Democrats
Popular vote	822	703	120
Percentage	46.9%	40.1%	10.4%
Swing	▼4.9pp	▼8.1pp	▲10.4pp
TPP	54.2%	45.8%
TPP swing	▲2.4pp	▼2.4pp
MP before election
Jon Isaacs
Labor
Elected MP
Terry Smith
Labor

A by-election for the seat of Millner in the Northern Territory Legislative Assembly was held on 21 November 1981. The by-election was triggered by the resignation of Labor member and Leader of the Opposition Jon Isaacs. Labor candidate and future Leader of the Opposition Terry Smith won the election against CLP candidate John Robinson.

== Results ==
Millner by-election, 1981
Party	Candidate	Votes	%	±%
Labor	Terry Smith	822	46.9	−4.9
Country Liberal	John Robinson	703	40.1	−8.1
Democrats	Rosemary Harris	120	10.4	+10.4
Independent	Peter Lawrence	35	2.0	+2.0
Independent	William Harding	12	0.7	+0.7
Total formal votes		1,754	96.9	−0.1
Informal votes		56	3.1	+0.1
Turnout		1,810	75.6	−9.2
Two-party-preferred result
Labor	Terry Smith	950	54.2	+2.4
Country Liberal	John Robinson	804	45.8	−2.4
Labor hold		Swing	+2.4	
