= Gerry Wood =

Australian politician (born 1950)

Member of the Northern Territory Legislative Assembly for Nelson
- In office 18 August 2001 – 22 August 2020

Personal details
- Born: Gerard Vincent Wood; 5 April 1950 (age 76)
- Occupation: Politician

Gerard Vincent Wood (born 5 April 1950) is an Australian politician. A former mayor of the Northern Territory shire of Litchfield, he was an independent member of the Northern Territory Legislative Assembly from 2001 to 2020, representing the electorate of Nelson.

== Career ==
Northern Territory Legislative Assembly
| Years | Term | Electoral division | Party |
|---|---|---|---|
| 2001–2005 | 9th | Nelson | Independent |
| 2005–2008 | 10th | Nelson | Independent |
| 2008–2012 | 11th | Nelson | Independent |
| 2012–2016 | 12th | Nelson | Independent |
| 2016–2020 | 13th | Nelson | Independent |

Wood worked in Daly River and on Bathurst Island as a young man, working in a number of careers, including running a tourist operation and working as the town clerk of Nguiu. In 1984, he relocated to Howard Springs, between Darwin and Palmerston. While at Howard Springs, he worked as a vegetable and poultry farmer, and became involved with local government, subsequently spending five years as the President of the Litchfield Shire Council. It was in this position that he emerged as a key figure in the fight against the damming of the Elizabeth River, with which he has been credited as having saved. This gave him a significant profile in his area when he decided to contest the seat of Nelson at the 2001 election.

Nelson had a long history of independent candidates, as independent Noel Padgham-Purich had held the seat for most of its history, and Country Liberal Party sitting member Chris Lugg had only narrowly won the seat from new independent candidate Dave Tollner at the 1997 election. In the leadup to the election, Wood was tipped to have a strong chance of ousting Lugg, and subsequently won 42% of the vote, which was enough to elect him with the help of Labor Party preferences. In the immediate aftermath, there was a real possibility of a hung parliament, which would have likely left Wood with the balance of power in the Assembly. However, Labor managed to seize majority control with Matthew Bonson's narrow win in the electorate of Millner, which severely limited Wood's potential influence in the Assembly. Once the new Assembly began sitting, new ALP Chief Minister Clare Martin offered Wood the position of Deputy Speaker under fellow independent Loraine Braham, and Wood soon accepted.

As an MP, Wood has served on a number of committees, including public accounts, environment and sustainable development, substance abuse and estimates. While he has not maintained as high a profile as Braham, he received some attention from the national media in November 2004, when he discovered the theft of a 10-tonne steel railway bridge in his electorate after hearing a report from a constituent. The same month, in response to a severe shortage of fruit pickers in the Territory, Wood wandered around the Mindil Beach Markets, a popular tourist attraction, dressed as a mango tree. Not all of the publicity Wood has received has been for his political efforts; in 2004, Wood won the over-45s division of the Litchfield Gift foot race.

Wood faced his second electoral test at the 2005 election. He campaigned largely on maintaining an independent voice in the Assembly and on social issues such as the state of the Royal Darwin Hospital. Despite a controversial redistribution which moved the Robertson Barracks into his electorate, Wood held his seat with a swing in his favour, polling nearly double the vote of his nearest rival. Wood had hoped to retain the position of Deputy Speaker after the election, but was replaced with Labor backbencher Len Kiely. He has retained his seat in the 2008 election.

Gerry comes from a Horticultural background having studied Horticultural Science at Burnley (University of Melbourne) before coming to the Northern Territory in 1970.

In 2018, in the midst of a financial crisis in the Territory, Wood supported a call to discuss merging the Northern Territory with South Australia.

== Retirement ==
Gerry Wood the independent MP for Nelson, formally announced his retirement in February 2019. He did not contest the 2020 Northern Territory general election.

== Political views ==
Wood is a staunch opponent of abortion, having compared it to domestic violence and describing it as a "fashion" during parliamentary debates, but has condemned the harassment of women outside abortion clinics. He was one of four MLAs who opposed a bill that decriminalised abortion in the Northern Territory.

Northern Territory Legislative Assembly
| Preceded by Chris Lugg | Member for Nelson; 2001–2020 | Succeeded by Gerard Maley |
