= 2014 Casuarina by-election =

By-election in the Northern Territory, Australia

	First party	Second party	Third party
Candidate	Lauren Moss	Harry Kypreos	Michael Conrad
Party	Labor	Country Liberal	Greens
First preference vote	1,579	1,525	412
Percentage	42.1%	40.6%	11.0%
Swing	▼17.2	▼0.1	▲11.0
TPP	55.2%	44.8%
TPP swing	▼4.1	▲4.1
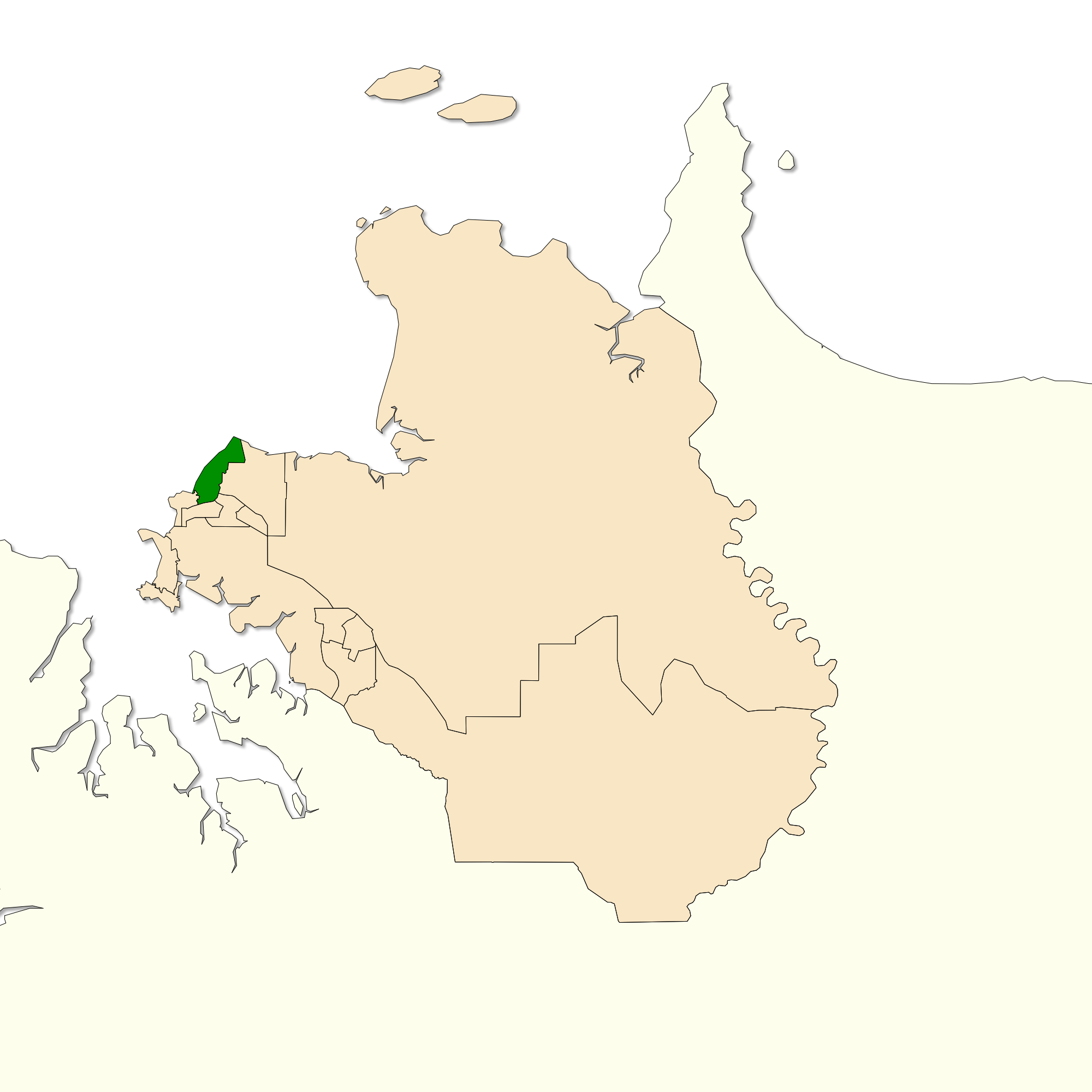
- The electoral division of Casuarina in the Darwin/Palmerston area.

A by-election for the seat of Casuarina in the Northern Territory Legislative Assembly was held on 18 October 2014. The by-election was triggered by the resignation of Labor MP Kon Vatskalis, who retained the seat at the 2012 election with a 59.3 percent primary and two-party vote. It was held on the same day as the 2014 Vasse by-election in Western Australia.

== Candidates ==
The seven candidates in ballot paper order were:

Candidate nominations
Independent	George Mamouzellos
Independent	Trevor Jenkins
Independent	Jack Henderson
Citizens Electoral Council	Trudy Campbell
Labor Party	Lauren Moss
Country Liberal Party	Harry Kypreos
Greens	Michael Connard

== Results ==
Casuarina by-election, 2014
Party	Candidate	Votes	%	±%
Labor	Lauren Moss	1,579	42.1	−17.2
Country Liberal	Harry Kypreos	1,525	40.6	−0.1
Greens	Michael Conrad	412	11.0	+11.0
Independent	George Mamouzellos	99	2.6	+2.6
Independent	Trevor Jenkins	78	2.1	+2.1
Independent	Jack Henderson	36	1.0	+1.0
Citizens Electoral Council	Trudy Campbell	25	0.7	+0.7
Total formal votes		3,754	96.6	−1.4
Informal votes		133	3.4	+1.4
Turnout		3,887	70.9	−15.0
Two-party-preferred result
Labor	Lauren Moss	2,072	55.2	−4.1
Country Liberal	Harry Kypreos	1,682	44.8	+4.1
Labor hold		Swing	−4.1	

== See also ==
- List of Northern Territory by-elections
