= Ken Parish =

Australian politician

Kenneth Alan Parish (born 20 September 1953) is a former Australian politician. He was the Labor member for Millner in the Northern Territory Legislative Assembly from 1991 to 1994.

Northern Territory Legislative Assembly
Years	Term	Electoral division	Party
1991–1994	6th	Millner	Labor

In early 2020, Parish joined Territory Alliance, a newly formed political party led by former Country Liberal Party (CLP) Chief Minister Terry Mills.

Northern Territory Legislative Assembly
Preceded by Terry Smith	Member for Millner; 1991–1994	Succeeded by Phil Mitchell
