= Lauren Moss =

Australian politician (born 1987)

Member of the Northern Territory Legislative Assembly for Casuarina
- In office 18 October 2014 – 24 August 2024
- Preceded by: Kon Vatskalis
- Succeeded by: Khoda Patel

Personal details
- Born: Lauren Jane Moss; 6 May 1987 (age 39) Crewe, United Kingdom
- Party: Labor Party
- Spouse: Jake Lutz
- Education: Charles Darwin University; Monash University
- Occupation: Politician

Lauren Jane Moss (born 6 May 1987) is an Australian politician. She was elected the Labor member for Casuarina in the Northern Territory Legislative Assembly in a by-election held on 18 October 2014 to replace Kon Vatskalis, a seat which she held for 10 years. She is the youngest ever member of Northern Territory Parliament. Prior to entering politics she was a youth advocate.

== Early life ==
Born in Crewe in the United Kingdom, Moss has lived in the Northern Territory since emigrating to Australia in 1999. She has a Bachelor of Business from Charles Darwin University and Monash University. Before entering politics, she ran a small business and worked in mental health services.

She won an Excellence in Youth Leadership award at the NT Young Achiever Awards and the NT Pride of Australia Young Leader Medal. She was also a finalist in the NT Young Australian of the Year, Darwin City Council Young Citizen of the Year, and The Australian Woman's Weekly Women of the Future.

== Politics ==
Northern Territory Legislative Assembly
Years	Term	Electoral division	Party
2014–2016	12th	Casuarina	Labor
2016–2020	13th	Casuarina	Labor
2020–2024	14th	Casuarina	Labor

Moss is the youngest ever member of the Northern Territory Parliament and is the second member of Indian descent. Moss' grandfather was from India and migrated to England.

=== Member for Casuarina ===
Moss became the Member for Casuarina at a by-election held on 18 October 2014 to replace Kon Vatskalis who retired. She was re-elected at the 2016 Northern Territory Election.

In the 2024 Northern Territory general election, she was unseated by Khoda Patel from the Country Liberal Party.

Northern Territory Legislative Assembly
Preceded by Kon Vatskalis	Member for Casuarina; 2014–2024	Succeeded by Khoda Patel
