= Gerard Maley =

Australian politician (born 1970)

Gerard Maley MLA

21st Deputy Chief Minister of the Northern Territory
- Incumbent
- Assumed office 9 September 2024
- Chief Minister: Lia Finocchiaro
- Preceded by: Chansey Paech

Member of the Northern Territory Legislative Assembly for Nelson
- Incumbent
- Assumed office 22 August 2020
- Preceded by: Gerry Wood

Personal details
- Born: 1970 (age 55–56) Darwin, Northern Territory, Australia
- Party: Country Liberal
- Education: Charles Darwin University
- Occupation: Lawyer

Gerard Maley (born 1970) is an Australian politician who serves as an MLA for Nelson as a member of the Country Liberal Party in the Northern Territory Legislative Assembly. He has been the Deputy Leader of the Country Liberal Party since September 2020 and Deputy Chief Minister of the Northern Territory since 9 September 2024, following the 2024 Northern Territory general election.

== Pre-politics ==
=== Early life ===
Maley's father was a policeman, and the family lived in Darwin where Maley was born, then settled in Howard Springs when he was 4 years old.

=== Professional life ===
Maley studied to be a mechanic after leaving high school in year 11, and then became an inspector and public relations agent for the Department of Transport & Works.

Following this, he returned to study law at Charles Darwin University, and after graduating, joined his brother, Peter, at Maleys Barristers & Solicitors. He manages the rural office in Coolalinga.

He currently lives on the same family block in Howard Springs that he grew up on.

== Politics ==
Northern Territory Legislative Assembly
Years	Term	Electoral division	Party
2020–present	14th	Nelson	Country Liberal

Maley was selected for the Country Liberals to contest the seat Nelson in the 2016 Northern Territory general election which he lost to long time independent member Gerry Wood. He recontested the seat in the 2020 election following Wood's retirement, and won the seat. He tallied 50.6 percent of the primary vote, enough to win the seat without the need for preferences. Ultimately, he won 59.2 percent of the two-candidate vote. However, for most of its existence, Nelson has been a comfortably safe CLP seat in "traditional" two-party matchups against Labor, so Maley's win was not considered an upset. Indeed, he now sits on a "traditional" two-party majority of 23.3 percent after picking up a healthy swing of 16.3 percent against Labor.

The election of 2020 saw only one member of the CLP returning to parliament, leader Lia Finocchiaro. As such there was a need to promote new parliamentarians into leadership roles. Maley was elected as Deputy Leader of the CLP, and hence Deputy Leader of the Opposition. He was also given the portfolios of Shadow Minister for Infrastructure, Multicultural Affairs, Defence Industries, Recreational Fishing, and National Resilience.

== Political views ==
Maley opposes the Indigenous Voice to Parliament.

=== Opposition to spaceflight ===
When the Australian government proposed having Katherine Bennell-Pegg take part in the ESA's 2028 EPIC mission to the ISS on October 26, 2026, Maley voiced his opposition to spaceflight, claiming it is "reckless" and "way out of touch with Australians."

Northern Territory Legislative Assembly
Preceded by Gerry Wood	Member for Nelson; 2020–present	Incumbent
