= 1987 Barkly by-election =

- 5 September 1987
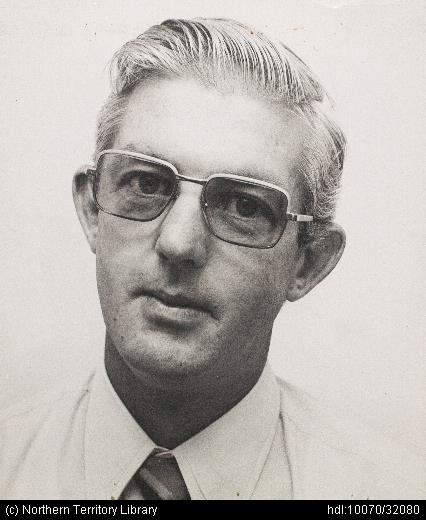

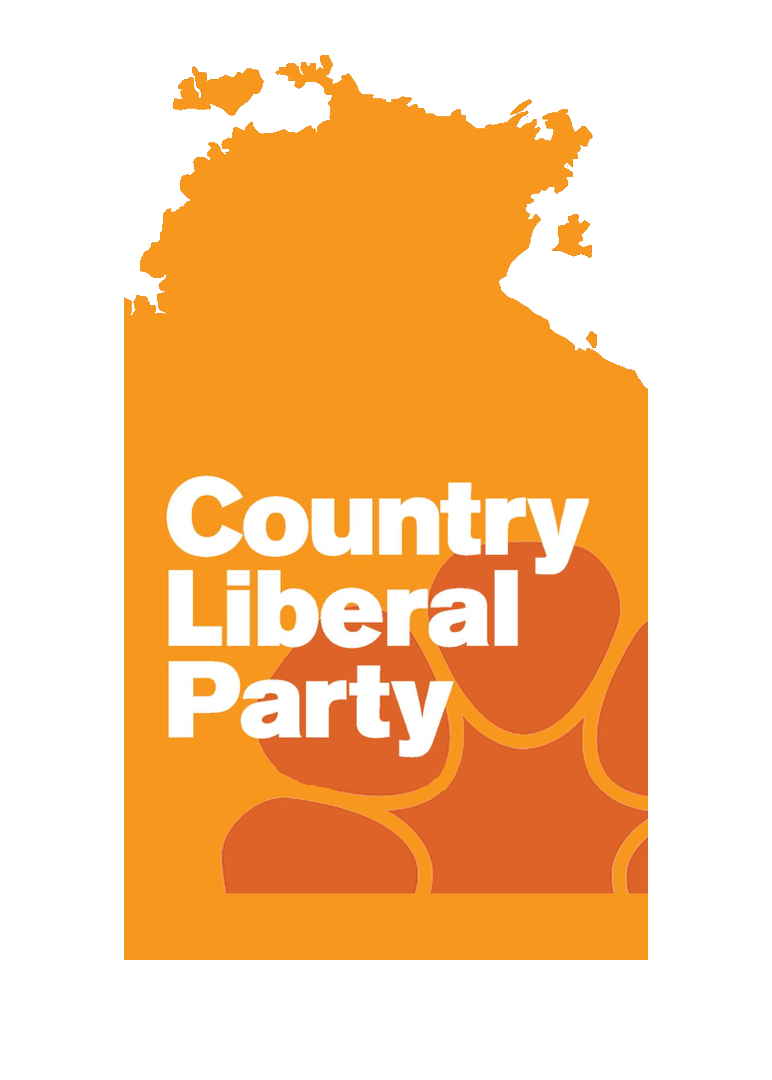
	First party	Second party	Third party
Candidate	Ian Tuxworth	Maggie Hickey	Malcolm Holt
Party	Nationals	Labor	Country Liberal
Popular vote	1,000	886	391
Percentage	42.0%	37.2%	16.4%
Swing	▲42.0	▼2.5	▼43.9
TPP	55.9%	44.1%
TPP swing	▲55.9	▲4.4
MP before election
Ian Tuxworth
Country Liberal
Elected MP
Ian Tuxworth
Nationals

A by-election for the seat of Barkly in the Northern Territory Legislative Assembly was held on 5 September 1987. Ian Tuxworth's election to the seat of Barkly was declared void after independent candidate Maggie Hickey challenged the result on the basis that the Labor candidate, Keith Hallet, held British nationality and was not an Australian citizen. Due to the close result (Tuxworth had won by only 19 votes), Justice John Nader voided the election on 30 July 1987.

Ian Tuxworth would recontest as the NT Nationals candidate and Maggie Hickey would recontest as the Labor candidate.

== Result ==
Barkly by-election, 1987
Party	Candidate	Votes	%	±%
NT Nationals	Ian Tuxworth	1,000	42.0	N/A
Labor	Maggie Hickey	886	37.2	−2.5
Country Liberal	Malcolm Holt	391	16.4	−43.9
Independent	Kevin Conway	104	4.4	N/A
Total formal votes		2,381	94.4	±0.0
Informal votes		141	5.6	±0.0
Turnout		2,522	68.3	2.5
Two-candidate-preferred result
NT Nationals	Ian Tuxworth	1,332	55.9	N/A
Labor	Maggie Hickey	1,049	44.1	+4.4
NT Nationals gain from Country Liberal		Swing	N/A	
