= Steve Edgington =

Australian politician

Steve Edgington MLA

Member of the Northern Territory Legislative Assembly for Barkly
- Incumbent
- Assumed office 22 August 2020
- Preceded by: Gerry McCarthy

Personal details
- Party: Country Liberal Party
- Occupation: Police officer

Steven Mark Edgington is an Australian politician from the Northern Territory.

Edgington moved to Darwin in 1988 to join the police force. In his time in the Territory he has lived and worked in a number of locations including senior police roles in Tennant Creek.

Northern Territory Legislative Assembly
| Years | Term | Electoral division | Party |
|---|---|---|---|
| 2020–present | 14th | Barkly | Country Liberal |

Edgington became mayor of Barkly Regional Council, a position he held at the time of the election. He ran for parliament while concurrently holding the position of mayor, leading some to suggest a conflict of interest.

Edgington was a candidate in the 2020 Northern Territory general election for the seat of Barkly for the Country Liberal Party. While he was behind for most of the count after the election, he made up ground due to the postal votes, and won the seat by a margin of 5 votes.

Northern Territory Legislative Assembly
| Preceded by Gerry McCarthy | Member for Barkly; 2020–present | Incumbent |
