= Khoda Patel =

Australian politician

Khoda Patel MLA

Member of the Northern Territory Legislative Assembly for Casuarina
- Incumbent
- Assumed office 24 August 2024
- Preceded by: Lauren Moss

Personal details
- Born: Gujarat, India
- Party: Country Liberal Party

Khoda Patel is an Australian politician from the Country Liberal Party.

Patel was born in Gujarat, India and lived in Cyprus before he moved to Australia.

In the 2024 Northern Territory general election, he unseated Labor member Lauren Moss in Casuarina.

Northern Territory Legislative Assembly
Preceded by Lauren Moss	Member for Casuarina; 2024–present	Incumbent
