= Kon Vatskalis =

Australian politician (born 1957)

The Right Worshipful The Lord Mayor Kon Vatskalis
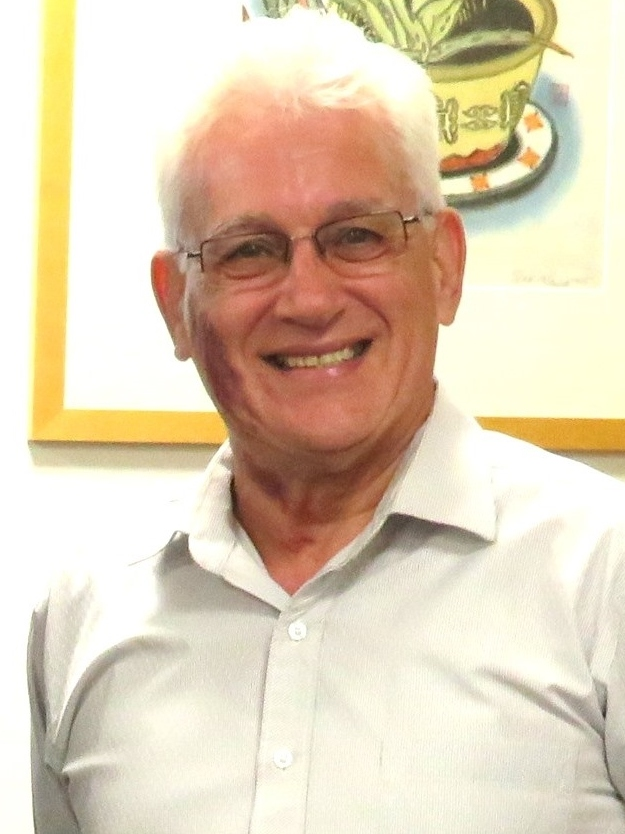
- Vatskalis in 2019

Lord Mayor of Darwin
- In office 4 September 2017 – 17 September 2025
- Preceded by: Katrina Fong Lim
- Succeeded by: Peter Styles

Member of the Northern Territory Legislative Assembly for Casuarina
- In office 18 August 2001 – 18 September 2014
- Preceded by: Peter Adamson
- Succeeded by: Lauren Moss

Personal details
- Born: Konstantine Vatskalis; 4 April 1957 (age 69) Cephalonia, Greece
- Party: Independent (since 2017)
- Other political affiliations: Labor (1980s–2017)
- Spouse(s): Linda Cotton; Margaret Vatskalis / Aihong Yu

Konstantine Vatskalis (born 4 April 1957) is a Greek-Australian politician and the former Lord Mayor of Darwin. Before becoming Lord Mayor in 2017 he was a Labor Party member of the Northern Territory Legislative Assembly from September 2001 to October 2014, representing the Darwin-based electorate of Casuarina. He was Minister for Business and Economic Development, Minister for Regional Development, Minister for Defence Support, Minister for Sport and Recreation, Minister for Essential Services, Minister for Health, Minister for Mines and Energy, Minister for Primary Industries and Fisheries and Minister for Children and Families.

On 30 July 2014, Vatskalis announced that he would be resigning from the Legislative Assembly at the end of the August sittings, which triggered a 2014 Casuarina by-election.

In 2017, Vatskalis was elected Lord Mayor of Darwin, he lost re-election and was succeeded as the Lord Mayor of Darwin by Peter Styles in 2025.

== Early years ==
Vatskalis was born in Greece, and studied public health in Athens. He became involved in student politics while there, becoming a student representative at the Athens Higher Vocational School and taking part in the 1970s pro-democracy protests, where he witnessed people being arrested for speaking freely. He married an Australian woman, Linda Cotton in 1982, and in 1983, they emigrated to Western Australia. Once they had arrived in Perth, Vatskalis found that his Greek qualifications were not recognised, and was forced to start again, beginning a degree in environmental health at Curtin University, where he also joined the Labor Party. After graduating in 1985, he worked as an environmental health officer and surveyor in the Western Australian towns of Port Hedland and Wanneroo from 1986 to 1993. This period was also marked by personal tragedy, however; his wife died in 1988. In 1992, not long before leaving Western Australia, Vatskalis completed post-graduate studies this time in environmental science from Murdoch University.

In 1993, Vatskalis secured a job managing the NT Health Department's Darwin Environmental Health Unit, which meant relocating to the Northern Territory. He quickly became involved in Darwin's multicultural community, taking up a position hosting a Greek community radio show the same year, and going on to present a weekly nationwide Greek news segment on SBS Radio. Vatskalis also served a stint on the Northern Territory Police's Ethnic Advisory Committee.

== Election to parliament ==
Northern Territory Legislative Assembly
Years	Term	Electoral division	Party
2001–2005	9th	Casuarina	Labor
2005–2008	10th	Casuarina	Labor
2008–2012	11th	Casuarina	Labor
2012–2014	12th	Casuarina	Labor

Vatskalis left the Environmental Health Unit in 1999, taking up a position at Danila Dilba, the indigenous health service in Darwin. However, this was to be short-lived, as he soon nominated for Labor Party pre-selection to contest the seat of Casuarina at the 2001 election. Vatskalis was successful in gaining preselection, but was not widely expected to be elected. Not only had the ALP ever won Casuarina, but Vatskalis was facing incumbent MP and Arts, Sciences and Ethnic Affairs Minister Peter Adamson. However, in an unexpected result, a massive Labor wave swept through Darwin, allowing the party to win government for the first time ever. Notably, Labor took every seat in the northern portion of the capital—among them Casuarina, for the first time ever. Vatskalis took the seat on a swing of 13 percent.

== Initial success as a minister ==
Though he had not even been tipped to win the seat, Vatskalis was immediately appointed to the ministry upon entering parliament, with new Chief Minister Clare Martin selecting him as her Minister for Lands, Planning and Environment, Housing, Local Government and Ethnic Affairs. He sparked brief controversies in October and November, when he oversaw the sale of a large public housing complex in Alice Springs and then attempts at compulsorily acquiring homes in Berry Springs, which were dumped after a public outcry.

Despite these hiccups, he was widely seen to be an effective minister, and was subsequently appointed to three additional portfolios—Transport, Infrastructure and Essential Services in a reshuffle on 16 November. He also began to win praise from several sectors over his handling of a number of issues, including opening up a large number of new housing blocks and both introducing speed limits on the Lasseter Highway and funding road repair projects in an attempt to curb the number of road deaths. He was also responsible for closing Darwin's Lake Leanyer after a coronial inquest into a death there. In February 2002, the Northern Territory News suggested that Vatskalis had "consistently been one of the Government's better performers", though they also criticised him for not appointing "new blood" to his departments. The usually conservative tabloid made similar comments in their report on the performance of the Martin ministry on the first anniversary of the election in August, suggesting that he had "impressed observers with his willingness to confront his new responsibilities."

== Difficulties and demotion ==
It was around this point, however, where Vatskalis' initial positive stint ended, and he began to face serious difficulties in his position. He was criticised for the sacking without explanation of one of the Territory's most senior public servants, the head of the Parks and Wildlife Service, Dr Bill Freeland, and had recurring problems surrounding the planned gas plant at Wickham Point on Darwin Harbour. As the contracts had already been signed by the Burke Country Liberal Party government, Vatskalis had little choice but to continue supporting the construction of the gas plant, despite significant pressure from angry community groups. In October 2002, Vatskalis had to be placed under police protection when he received death threats from residents angry over a decision to approve the construction of a private school in a suburban street.

In January 2003, Vatskalis—allegedly unilaterally—banned flights over the Katherine Gorge, but was forced to remove the ban less than a month later after a public outcry. He also became embroiled in a nasty stoush with the taxi industry over planned reforms, clashed with environmentalists over land-clearing around the Daly River area, and was the subject of a damaging A Current Affair report over his handling of the impact on pastoralists from the Alice Springs–Darwin Railway. These controversies were amplified by a personal scandal in August 2003, when Vatskalis was found to be offering paid translation services over the internet while an MP. Not long after, the Northern Territory media reported a number of concerns about a taxpayer-funded trip taken by Vatskalis and Chief Minister Martin in August–September.

While he had also had some successes in this period, cracking down on antisocial behavior by youths in cars, forcing licenses upon the building industry after a series of scams, and attempting to convince the federal government to hand Kakadu National Park back to the NT government—a move soon supported by MPs on both sides of NT politics—the series of incidents throughout 2003 had severely tarnished Vatskalis' reputation.

== December 2003 Ministerial reshuffle ==
In the December 2003 ministerial reshuffle sparked by the axing of Health Minister Jane Aagaard, Vatskalis was severely demoted, losing all his portfolios except Ethnic Affairs, and being given the new responsibilities of Mines and Energy and Primary Industries and Fisheries.

Although the reshuffle had seen Vatskalis demoted, the new portfolios allowed him to move away from the areas in which he had been under siege. In his new portfolio, he signed several new resource exploration permits and launched several programs attempting to promote the Northern Territory to mining companies, in the hope of boosting the industry. He launched a significant shakeup of mining laws, blocked proposals to create a second mine in the Kakadu National Park, and oversaw the proposal to clean up the environmental damage from the abandoned Mount Todd gold mine, near Katherine. In 2006 he instigated the "China and Japan Investment attraction strategy" targeting China and Japan for the Territory's mineral resources. He led a number of delegations to China and presented the Territory's mineral wealth to mining companies and investors in China. This led to the attraction of significant investment in the mining sector by Chinese companies making China the number 1 trade partner of the territory. The success of this strategy was highlighted by the 2010 Darwin visit of the then Vice President (and current paramount leader) of China Xi Jinping. Vatskalis also won favour from the recreational fishing community, banning commercial fishing in the Adelaide River and rejecting proposals to introduce fishing licenses in the Territory.

Vatskalis faced his first electoral test at the 2005 election, and despite having won the seat from the CLP for the first time ever in 2001, was easily elected with a massive swing in his favour, amidst a landslide result across the Territory. He comfortably retained the seat again in 2008, albeit with a 4.2% swing against him, but still holding a 14% majority.

Another cabinet reshuffle on 4 February 2009 saw Vatskalis take the Government's Health portfolio from Dr Chris Burns while remaining the Minister for Primary Industry, Fisheries and Resources. In December 2009 he added the child protection portfolio to his duties.

Northern Territory Legislative Assembly
Preceded by Peter Adamson	Member for Casuarina; 2001–2014	Succeeded by Lauren Moss
Civic offices
Preceded by Katrina Fong Lim	Lord Mayor of Darwin; 2017–2025	Succeeded by Peter Styles
