= Elliot McAdam =

Australian politician (1951–2024)

Elliot McAdam AM

Member of the Northern Territory Parliament for Barkly
- In office 18 August 2001 – 8 August 2008
- Preceded by: Maggie Hickey
- Succeeded by: Gerry McCarthy

Personal details
- Born: Elliot Arthur McAdam; 1951 Elliott, Northern Territory, Australia
- Died: 5 August 2024 (aged 72)
- Party: Labor Party

Elliot Arthur McAdam AM (1951 – 5 August 2024) was an Australian politician, serving as the Labor Party (ALP) member for Barkly in the Northern Territory Legislative Assembly from 2001 to 2008.

Northern Territory Legislative Assembly
| Years | Term | Electoral division | Party |
|---|---|---|---|
| 2001–2005 | 9th | Barkly | Labor |
| 2005–2008 | 10th | Barkly | Labor |

Born in Elliott, Northern Territory, McAdam was the general manager of the Julalikari Aboriginal Council before entering the Assembly. First elected in 2001, McAdam was re-elected in 2005 and appointed Minister for Local Government and Housing. His portfolio was extended to include Central Australia, Corporate and Information Services and Communications in September 2006. McAdam resigned from the ministry in 2008 after one of his local government reorganisation initiatives was abandoned by the Henderson Government. He retired in 2008.

McAdam unsuccessfully contested Barkly as an independent at the 2016 election, losing to his successor Gerry McCarthy.

McAdam died on 5 August 2024, at the age of 72. A state memorial was held in Alice Springs on 12 September 2024 to honour him and former NT Chief Minister Clare Martin remembered him as "a man of principle and integrity" who "genuinely cared".

== Honours ==
McAdam was appointed Member of the Order of Australia (AM) in the 2015 Queen's Birthday Honours "for significant service to the community of Barkly, and to the Legislative Assembly of the Northern Territory."

Northern Territory Legislative Assembly
| Preceded by Maggie Hickey | Member for Barkly; 2001–2008 | Succeeded by Gerry McCarthy |
