= Maggie Hickey =

Australian politician (born 1946)

Leader of the Opposition (Northern Territory)
- In office 16 April 1996 – 2 February 1999
- Preceded by: Brian Ede
- Succeeded by: Clare Martin

Member of the Northern Territory Legislative Assembly for Barkly
- In office 27 October 1990 – 1 August 2001
- Preceded by: Ian Tuxworth
- Succeeded by: Elliot McAdam

Personal details
- Born: 16 October 1946 (age 80) Surrey, England, United Kingdom
- Party: Labor Party
- Spouse: John Hickey

Margaret Anne Hickey (born 16 October 1946) is an Australian former politician. She represented the electoral division of Barkly for the Labor Party in the Northern Territory Legislative Assembly from 1990 to 2001. She was Leader of the Opposition from 1996 to 1999.

Hickey was born in Surrey, England and emigrated to Australia with her husband in 1975. She was a librarian prior to entering politics. In the 1980s, Hickey was a strident campaigner against a proposed toxic waste incinerator in Tennant Creek that was supported by local MLA and Chief Minister Ian Tuxworth from 1984 onwards. She was a member of the Labor Party up until her resignation about six months before the 1987 election, having become disillusioned with a number of stances of the local party branch. At the 1987 election, she challenged Tuxworth, who by this stage had been ousted as Chief Minister and left the governing Country Liberal Party for the rival Northern Territory Nationals, as an independent candidate. She was defeated by only nineteen votes, and overturned the result in the Court of Disputed Returns, which found that the Labor candidate had been unqualified to stand. Hickey contested the ensuing by-election as the Labor candidate, but was again defeated by Tuxworth.

Northern Territory Legislative Assembly
| Years | Term | Electoral division | Party |
|---|---|---|---|
| 1990–1994 | 6th | Barkly | Labor |
| 1994–1997 | 7th | Barkly | Labor |
| 1997–2001 | 8th | Barkly | Labor |

She contested Barkly again at the 1990 election. A redistribution ahead of that election made Barkly notionally Labor. Tuxworth believed this made Barkly unwinnable, and unsuccessfully tried to switch to the seat of Goyder. This allowed Hickey to take the seat on a large swing. On 16 April 1996, Opposition Leader Brian Ede resigned as territory Labor leader, and Hickey, who had been Ede's deputy, was elected the new leader. Her term as leader saw her deal with Labor's response to the government's controversial mandatory sentencing laws, largely cited as a factor in the CLP's landslide win at the 1997 election, disputes over native title, and the 1998 statehood referendum. In August 1998, she defeated a leadership challenge by Syd Stirling with a margin of six votes to one. She ardently opposed federal Labor's restrictions on expanding uranium mining, condemning both the "three mines" and "no new mines" policies.

On 2 February 1999, Hickey announced that she was resigning as Labor leader and Opposition Leader in order to spend more time with her husband who had been diagnosed with a brain tumour. She stated that she would remain as the member for Barkly in the Assembly until the next election, and Clare Martin was elected to succeed her as party leader the next day. Asked about her resignation in 2002, following her successor Martin's landmark 2001 election victory, Hickey stated that she had no regrets about the decision.

After retiring from parliament in 2001, Hickey moved to Adelaide, where she studied visual arts at the University of South Australia.

Northern Territory Legislative Assembly
| Preceded by Ian Tuxworth | Member for Barkly; 1990–2001 | Succeeded by Elliot McAdam |
Political offices
| Preceded by Brian Ede | Leader of the Opposition (Northern Territory); 1996–1999 | Succeeded by Clare Martin |
Party political offices
| Preceded by Brian Ede | Leader of the Labor Party in the Northern Territory; 1996–1999 | Succeeded by Clare Martin |
