= Jon Isaacs =

Australian politician (born 1949)

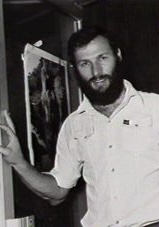
Isaacs in 1978.

Northern Territory Legislative Assembly
Years	Term	Electoral division	Party
1977–1980	2nd	Millner	Labor
1980–1981	3rd	Millner	Labor

Jonathan Martin Isaacs (born 10 September 1949) is an Australian former politician. He was the Labor member for Millner in the Northern Territory Legislative Assembly from 1977 to 1981, and was the ALP's first leader in that body and the Territory's first Opposition Leader.

The Electorate of Millner was named after James Millner, the medical officer in George Goyder's 1869 expedition to found the first colony at Port Darwin, who drowned in the SS Gothenburg tragedy.

Northern Territory Legislative Assembly
Preceded by Roger Ryan	Member for Millner; 1977–1981	Succeeded by Terry Smith
