= Terry Smith (politician) =

Australian politician

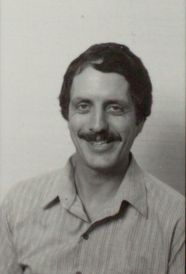
Smith in 1981.

Terrence Edward "Terry" Smith (born 26 November 1946) was a Labor Party member of Australia's Northern Territory Legislative Assembly, representing Millner. A member of the Labor Party, he was elected to the Assembly on 21 November 1980, following the resignation of Jon Isaacs on 2 November. He resigned on 21 November 1991, and was succeeded by Ken Parish.

Northern Territory Legislative Assembly
Years	Term	Electoral division	Party
1981–1983	3rd	Millner	Labor
1983–1987	4th	Millner	Labor
1987–1990	5th	Millner	Labor
1990–1991	6th	Millner	Labor

He served as the leader of the opposition from 19 August 1986 until October 1990

Northern Territory Legislative Assembly
Preceded by Jon Isaacs	Member for Millner; 1981–1991	Succeeded by Ken Parish
