= Roger Ryan (politician) =

Australian politician

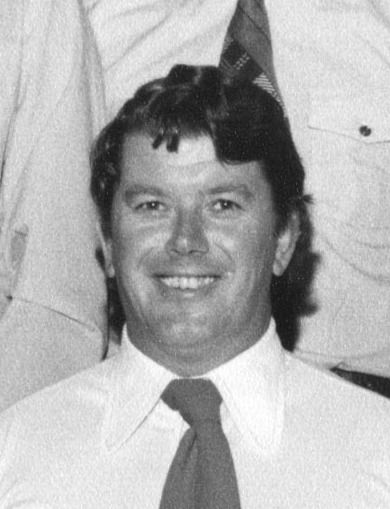
Ryan in 1976

Northern Territory Legislative Assembly
Years	Term	Electoral division	Party
1974–1977	1st	Millner	Country Liberal

Roger Ryan (born 2 August 1939) is a former Australian politician. He was the Country Liberal Party member for Millner in the Northern Territory Legislative Assembly from 1974 to 1977.

Northern Territory Legislative Assembly
Preceded by New seat	Member for Millner; 1974–1977	Succeeded by Jon Isaacs
