= Electoral division of Nelson (Northern Territory) =

Coordinates: 12.555285°S 131.068505°E

Nelson Northern Territory—Legislative Assembly
- Interactive map of boundaries as of the 2024 election
- Territory: Northern Territory
- Created: 1990
- MP: Gerard Maley
- Party: Country Liberal
- Namesake: Harold George Nelson
- Electors: 6,429 (2026)
- Area: 1,415 km^{2} (546.3 sq mi)
- Demographic: Rural
Electorates around Nelson:
Timor Sea	Timor Sea	Timor Sea
Timor Sea; Wanguri; Karama	Nelson	Goyder
Spillett; Drysdale; Blain	Goyder	Goyder

Nelson is an electoral division of the Legislative Assembly in Australia's Northern Territory. It was first created in 1990 as a replacement for Koolpinyah, and was named after Harold George Nelson, the first member for the federal Northern Territory electorate. Nelson is a largely rural electorate, covering 1,415 km² and taking in the small towns of Howard Springs, McMinn's Lagoon and part of Humpty Doo, and some areas between Darwin and Palmerston. There were 6,429 people enrolled in the electorate as of July 2026.

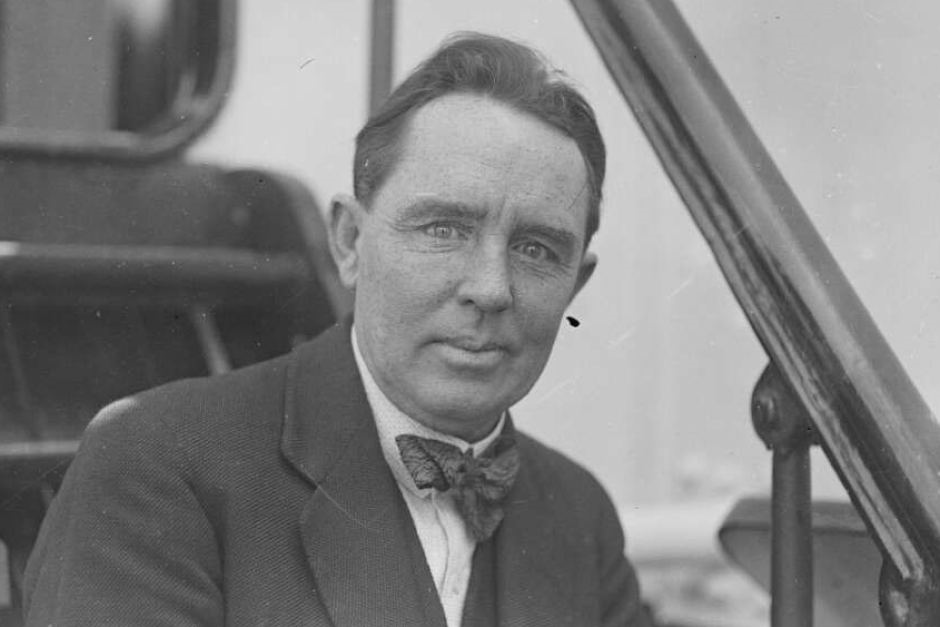
Harold Nelson, c. 1919.

Nelson is also a rarity among Northern Territory electorates in that it has traditionally been an independent-held seat, as opposed to being held by either of the major parties. Long-serving independent Noel Padgham-Purich held the seat for the last few years of her career, having previously represented most of the area as the member for Koolpinyah from 1983 to 1990. She only narrowly failed in installing another independent, Dave Tollner, as her replacement. Country Liberal Party member Chris Lugg, held the seat for one term before being defeated by another independent, Gerry Wood. Wood was easily re-elected at the 2005 election, polling more than double the vote of his nearest rival, Lugg. He increased his vote by over 20% for the second election in a row in 2008, winning 72.2% of the primary vote with a two-party preferred margin of 28.7% over the CLP, the safest seat in the Territory. His margin dwindled to 9.2 percent when the CLP regained government in 2012, but ballooned to 23.7 percent during Labor's victory in 2016.

Wood retired at the 2020 election. Gerard Maley won the seat for the CLP on his second attempt after losing to Wood in 2016. Maley actually garnered enough primary votes to win the seat on the first count. However, for most of its existence, Nelson has been a comfortably safe CLP seat in "traditional" two-party matchups against Labor, so Maley's victory was not considered an upset.

== Members for Nelson ==
Member	Party	Term
Noel Padgham-Purich	Independent	1990–1997
Chris Lugg	Country Liberal	1997–2001
Gerry Wood	Independent	2001–2020
Gerard Maley	Country Liberal	2020–present

== Election results ==
2024 Northern Territory general election: Nelson
Party	Candidate	Votes	%	±%
Country Liberal	Gerard Maley	3,653	71.6	+20.6
Independent	Beverley Ratahi	743	14.5	−13.3
Labor	Anthony Venes	708	13.9	+1.9
Total formal votes		5,104	97.2	+0.3
Informal votes		146	2.8	−0.3
Turnout		5,250	82.3	
Two-party-preferred result (Note: Estimated two-party-preferred count by Antony Green.)
Country Liberal	Gerard Maley	4,057	79.5	+7.2
Labor	Anthony Venes	1,047	20.5	−7.2
Two-candidate-preferred result
Country Liberal	Gerard Maley	3,949	77.4	+5.1
Independent	Beverley Ratahi	1,155	22.6	−5.1
Country Liberal hold		Swing	+5.1	

== See also ==
- Electoral division of Nelson (disambiguation)
