= Peter Adamson (politician) =

Australian politician

Peter Francis Adamson (born 1961 in Darwin) is a former Australian politician. He was educated at private schools, and then at the University of Sydney, where he graduated with a bachelor of Arts, majoring in Politics. Prior to entering politics, he was the sports anchor on Channel Eight (now Channel Nine) News.

== Political career ==
Northern Territory Legislative Assembly
Years	Term	Electoral division	Party
1994–1997	7th	Casuarina	Country Liberal
1997–2001	8th	Casuarina	Country Liberal

In 1994, future Chief Minister Clare Martin was approached to contest the Darwin Legislative Assembly seat of Casuarina for the Labor Party at the 1994 election. However, she was defeated by Peter Adamson, standing as the candidate for the Country Liberal Party. He was re-elected at the 1997 election but defeated by Labor candidate Kon Vatskalis at the 2001 election when Labor won government in the Territory for the first time.

== Lord Mayor and subsequent fall from grace ==
In 2002 Adamson was elected Lord Mayor of Darwin. While Adamson knew many early successes, including economic investment, roadwork repairs, and sending himself and others as a mayoral delegation to Anchorage, Alaska (Darwin's sister city) to discuss expanding economic ties, Adamson's career soon came spiralling out of control, with the revelation of misuse of council funds to purchase comical items such as a refrigerator, women's underwear and a Darth Vader voice distorter.

The unfolding media speculation became "something of a ritual for several months as the case against Peter Adamson has ground through the court system with colourful and sometimes bizarre aspects of the story". Adamson, on initial criticism chose to see the funny side, on New Year's Eve he arrived at a party dressed as a fridge, with his girlfriend who went as a policewoman, Although he had stood aside from the job, Adamson was still drawing his $90,000 a year Lord Mayor's salaries when convicted. He was subsequently replaced by Garry Lambert. Adamson subsequently lost his appeal, with the judge calling him a sociopathic liar. Adamson was sentenced to seven months in prison but the sentence was to be suspended after two months and was released from prison in April 2008. He is engaged to Leanne Meharry.

Northern Territory Legislative Assembly
Preceded by Nick Dondas	Member for Casuarina; 1994–2001	Succeeded by Kon Vatskalis
