= Chris Lugg =

Australian politician

Northern Territory Legislative Assembly
Years	Term	Electoral division	Party
1997–2001	8th	Nelson	Country Liberal

Christopher Dennis Lugg (born 17 May 1948) is an Australian former politician. He was the Country Liberal Party member for Nelson in the Northern Territory Legislative Assembly from 1997 to 2001. He succeeded long-serving independent Noel Padgham-Purich, who had supported another independent, Dave Tollner; he was in turn defeated by Gerry Wood in 2001.

Northern Territory Legislative Assembly
Preceded by Noel Padgham-Purich	Member for Nelson; 1997–2001	Succeeded by Gerry Wood
