= Matthew Bonson =

Australian politician

Northern Territory Legislative Assembly
Years	Term	Electoral division	Party
2001–2005	9th	Millner	Labor
2005–2008	10th	Millner	Labor

Matthew Thomas Bonson is an Australian former politician. He was a Labor member of the Northern Territory Legislative Assembly, representing the seat of Millner from 2001 to 2008. Prior to his election, he worked as a local solicitor. He was Minister for Sport and Recreation, Corporate and Information Services, Senior Territorians, Young Territorians and Minister Assisting the Chief Minister on Multicultural Affairs. His seat was abolished at the 2008 election and he was defeated by Dave Tollner for the new seat of Fong Lim.

Northern Territory Legislative Assembly
Preceded by Phil Mitchell	Member for Millner; 2001–2008	Succeeded by Abolished
