= Phil Mitchell (politician) =

Australian politician (born 1953)

Northern Territory Legislative Assembly
Years	Term	Electoral division	Party
1994–1997	7th	Millner	Country Liberal
1997–2001	8th	Millner	Country Liberal

Philip Anthony Mitchell (born 17 April 1953) is a former Australian politician. He was the Country Liberal Party member for Millner in the Northern Territory Legislative Assembly from 1994 to 2001, when he was defeated by Matthew Bonson.

The Electorate of Millner was named after James Millner, the medical officer in Goyder's 1869 expedition to found the first colony at Port Darwin, who drowned in the SS Gothenburg tragedy.

Northern Territory Legislative Assembly
Preceded by Ken Parish	Member for Millner; 1994–2001	Succeeded by Matthew Bonson
