= Electoral division of Barkly =

Coordinates: 19°38′50″S 134°11′25″E

Barkly Northern Territory—Legislative Assembly
- Interactive map of boundaries as of the 2024 election
- Territory: Northern Territory
- Created: 1974
- MP: Steve Edgington
- Party: Country Liberal
- Namesake: Barkly Tableland
- Electors: 6,149 (2026)
- Area: 442,868 km^{2} (170,992.3 sq mi)
- Demographic: Remote
Electorates around Barkly:
Daly	Arnhem	Pacific Ocean
Gwoja	Barkly	Traeger (QLD)
Gwoja	Namatjira	Gregory (QLD)

Barkly is an electoral division of the Legislative Assembly in Australia's Northern Territory. It was first created in 1974, and is named after the Barkly Tableland area, which occupies much of the electorate. Barkly is a rural electorate, covering 442,868 km^{2} and taking in the towns of Tennant Creek, Borroloola, Ali Curung, Warrego, Tara Aboriginal Community and Alpururulam. There were 6,149 people enrolled in the electorate as of July 2026.

Barkly was created along with the creation of the Assembly in 1974 as a conservative-leaning marginal seat centred on the town of Tennant Creek. It was won at that election by Country Liberal Party candidate Ian Tuxworth, who later became a high-profile Cabinet minister and served as Chief Minister from 1984 to 1986. Tuxworth was comfortably re-elected as a CLP member in 1977, 1980 and 1983, but faced an extremely close race in 1987 after he quit the CLP in order to head the rival conservative NT Nationals party. He won a narrow victory over Labor Party candidate Maggie Hickey, but saw the win overturned by the Court of Disputed Returns upon a legal challenge from Hickey before again winning the resulting by-election. A redistribution ahead of the 1990 election made Barkly a notionally Labor seat, and Tuxworth mounted an ultimately unsuccessful bid for Goyder instead. Hickey was comfortably elected in Tuxworth's absence, and went on to serve as Opposition Leader from 1996 to 1999, before retiring due to ill health in 2001. Labor candidate Elliot McAdam was comfortably elected at the 2001 election before going on to serve as a minister in the Martin and Henderson Labor governments. He retired at the 2008 election, in which Labor's Gerry McCarthy was elected as his successor. In 2020 CLP Candidate Steve Edgington won the seat.

== Members for Barkly ==
Member	Party	Term
Ian Tuxworth	Country Liberal	1974–1987
Ian Tuxworth	NT Nationals	1987–1990
Maggie Hickey	Labor	1990–2001
Elliot McAdam	Labor	2001–2008
Gerry McCarthy	Labor	2008–2020
Steve Edgington	Country Liberal	2020–present

== Election results ==
2024 Northern Territory general election: Barkly
Party	Candidate	Votes	%	±%
Country Liberal	Steve Edgington	1,571	51.9	+10.9
Labor	Lizzie Hogan	1,454	48.1	+10.0
Total formal votes		3,017	97.6	+1.9
Informal votes		75	2.4	−1.9
Turnout		3,100	50.7	
Country Liberal hold		Swing	+1.7	
