= Electoral division of Casuarina =

Coordinates: 12°22.4′S 130°52.9′E

Casuarina Northern Territory—Legislative Assembly
- Interactive map of boundaries as of the 2024 election
- Territory: Northern Territory
- Created: 1974
- MP: Khoda Patel
- Party: Country Liberal
- Namesake: Casuarina
- Electors: 5,936 (2026)
- Area: 12 km^{2} (4.6 sq mi)
- Demographic: Urban
Electorates around Casuarina:
Timor Sea	Timor Sea	Timor Sea
Timor Sea	Casuarina	Wanguri
Nightcliff	Johnston	Sanderson

Casuarina is an electoral division of the Legislative Assembly in Australia's Northern Territory. It was first created in 1974 and was named after the adjacent suburb of Casuarina. Casuarina is an entirely urban electorate, covering only 12 km^{2} and taking in the suburbs of Brinkin, Nakara, Tiwi and part of Alawa, as well as the Charles Darwin University. There were 5,936 people enrolled in the electorate as of July 2026.

== History ==
For the first three decades of its existence, Casuarina, like most seats in the Darwin area, was a stronghold for the Country Liberal Party. Clare Martin did nearly manage to take the seat for the Labor Party upon the retirement of long-serving CLP member Nick Dondas in 1994, but lost out to the CLP's Peter Adamson, who held the seat for the next seven years. It was still widely presumed to be a safe Liberal seat in 2001, when it unexpectedly fell to Labor challenger Kon Vatskalis as part of Labor's sweep of the northern suburbs that year en route to winning government for the first time. Vatskalis easily retained the seat in 2005, 2008, and 2012. He resigned on 18 September 2014, which triggered a by-election. It was won by Labor candidate Lauren Moss with a reduced margin. Moss picked up enough of a swing in 2016 to make Casuarina much more secure for Labor, and consolidated her hold on the seat in 2020. In 2024 CLP candidate Khoda Patel won the seat.

== Members for Casuarina ==
Member	Party	Term
Nick Dondas	Country Liberal	1974–1994
Peter Adamson	Country Liberal	1994–2001
Kon Vatskalis	Labor	2001–2014
Lauren Moss	Labor	2014–2024
Khoda Patel	Country Liberal	2024–

== Election results ==
2024 Northern Territory general election: Casuarina
Party	Candidate	Votes	%	±%
Country Liberal	Khoda Patel	2,055	44.1	+21.7
Labor	Lauren Moss	1,559	33.4	−17.8
Greens	Pamela McCalman	578	12.4	+1.5
Independent	Martin Jackson	472	10.1	+10.1
Total formal votes		4,664	96.9	−0.5
Informal votes		147	3.1	+0.5
Turnout		4,811	81.5	
Two-party-preferred result
Country Liberal	Khoda Patel	2,365	50.7	+16.7
Labor	Lauren Moss	2,281	49.3	−16.7
Country Liberal gain from Labor		Swing	+16.7	
