= Electoral division of Millner =

Former electoral division of the Northern Territory

Millner Northern Territory—Legislative Assembly
- Territory: Northern Territory
- Created: 1974
- Abolished: 2008
- Namesake: Suburb of Millner
- Area: 22.74 km^{2} (8.8 sq mi)
- Demographic: Urban
- Coordinates: 12°23′28.00″S 130°51′47.55″E

Millner was an electoral division of the Legislative Assembly in Australia's Northern Territory. One of the Legislative Assembly's original electorates, it was first contested at the first election in 1974. It was named after the suburb of Millner, which in turn was named for James Millner, a doctor and early Australian explorer of the Northern Territory who drowned on the SS Gothenburg tragedy. It was abolished in 2008 and replaced with the new electorate of Fong Lim. Millner was an urban electorate, and at its abolition covered 22.74 km², taking in the suburbs of Millner, Coconut Grove, Ludmilla and part of Rapid Creek.

Millner was generally a Labor Party-held electorate, though it saw more members than almost anywhere else in the Territory. It was initially won by the Country Liberal Party in 1974, when they dominated the first Assembly, but emerged as an important seat for the ALP after 1977, when Jon Isaacs and Terry Smith held the seat, both of whom served stints as Opposition Leader. Ken Parish briefly held the seat after Smith's retirement, but was defeated by the CLP's Phil Mitchell in 1994, in a result tarred by claims of push-polling over native title issues.

Mitchell held the seat for two terms, but was defeated in the closest and most crucial battle of the 2001 election by ALP challenger Matthew Bonson. Despite a massive and unexpected Labor wave that swept through Darwin—particularly the more diverse and Labor-friendly northern portion—the result in Millner was not known for several days. Due to the close general result, Millner would have the effect of deciding whether there would be a hung parliament, with independents holding the balance of power, or whether the ALP would win government for the first time in Northern Territory history. In the end, Bonson won a very narrow victory, allowing Labor to sweep northern Darwin and form government by one seat. He was easily re-elected with a much larger majority four years later.

Millner was abolished in the electoral distribution that preceded the 2008 election. While Millner itself was shifted to the neighbouring seat of Johnston, the remainder of Millner's territory was merged with more conservative-leaning territory near Palmerston to form the new seat of Fong Lim. Bonson contested Fong Lim in the 2008 election, as it was still on paper a comfortably safe Labor seat. However, he was defeated by former federal MP Dave Tollner.

== Members for Millner ==
Member	Party	Term
Roger Ryan	Country Liberal	1974–1977
Jon Isaacs	Labor	1977–1981
Terry Smith	Labor	1981–1991
Ken Parish	Labor	1991–1994
Phil Mitchell	Country Liberal	1994–2001
Matthew Bonson	Labor	2001–2008

== Election results ==
2005 Northern Territory general election: Millner
Party	Candidate	Votes	%	±%
Labor	Matthew Bonson	1,888	52.7	+8.5
Independent	Phil Mitchell	758	21.2	+21.2
Country Liberal	Paul Mossman	598	16.7	−29.3
Greens	Rob Hoad	293	8.2	+8.2
Independent	Rob Inder-Smith	45	1.3	+1.3
Total formal votes		3,582	97.2	+2.6
Informal votes		102	2.8	−2.6
Turnout		3,684	83.1	
Two-party-preferred result
Labor	Matthew Bonson	2,429	67.8	+16.7
Country Liberal	Paul Mossman	1,153	32.2	−16.7
Two-candidate-preferred result
Labor	Matthew Bonson	2,250	62.8	+11.6
Independent	Phil Mitchell	1,332	37.2	+37.2
Labor hold		Swing	N/A	
