= List of VFL debuts in 1963 =

The 1963 Victorian Football League (VFL) season was the sixty-seventh season of the VFL. The season saw 113 Australian rules footballers make their senior VFL debut and three players transferring to new clubs having previously played in the VFL.

== Summary ==
Summary of debuts in 1963
Club	VFL debuts	Change of club
Carlton	7	0
Collingwood	8	0
Essendon	7	0
Fitzroy	19	0
Footscray	13	0
Geelong	6	0
Hawthorn	5	0
Melbourne	7	0
North Melbourne	9	2
Richmond	11	1
St Kilda	8	0
South Melbourne	13	0
Total	113	3

== Debuts ==
Name	Club	Age at debut	Round debuted	Games	Goals	Notes
Kevin Hall	Carlton	19 years, 67 days	12	169	50	
John Goold	Carlton	21 years, 339 days	7	108	3	
John Comben	Carlton	18 years, 311 days	1	38	11	
Greg Hardie	Carlton	17 years, 332 days	1	24	18	
Trevor Best	Carlton	21 years, 88 days	10	21	10	
Dave Rogers	Carlton	21 years, 136 days	14	7	1	
Doug Ringholt	Carlton	20 years, 259 days	6	6	0	
Ted Potter	Collingwood	18 years, 188 days	5	182	0	
Terry Waters	Collingwood	19 years, 134 days	2	163	181	
Ricky Watt	Collingwood	16 years, 219 days	4	95	17	
Max Urquhart	Collingwood	20 years, 307 days	3	92	28	
Ian Graham	Collingwood	20 years, 147 days	7	63	132	
Ernie Hug	Collingwood	19 years, 117 days	10	59	5	
Kevin McLean	Collingwood	20 years, 250 days	5	33	1	
John Murton	Collingwood	19 years, 317 days	3	2	3	
Darryl Gerlach	Essendon	19 years, 204 days	15	168	6	
Greg Brown	Essendon	20 years, 88 days	6	83	4	
Kevin Egan	Essendon	19 years, 348 days	16	65	13	
Jim Forsyth	Essendon	18 years, 348 days	10	29	4	Father of Tim Forsyth.
Noel Raitt	Essendon	19 years, 122 days	2	18	7	
Garry Fenton	Essendon	20 years, 168 days	5	6	0	
John Booth	Essendon	20 years, 314 days	8	2	0	
Gary Lazarus	Fitzroy	17 years, 211 days	1	132	206	
Doug Hellings	Fitzroy	18 years, 280 days	3	64	15	
Ron Fry	Fitzroy	26 years, 29 days	7	46	7	
Barry Fitzgerald	Fitzroy	24 years, 278 days	10	35	4	
Terry O'Mara	Fitzroy	22 years, 160 days	13	20	1	
Tony Hirst	Fitzroy	18 years, 8 days	9	19	3	
Brett Pollock	Fitzroy	20 years, 144 days	1	10	7	
Brian Carroll	Fitzroy	22 years, 77 days	8	10	0	Father of Damian Carroll.
Ted Lovett	Fitzroy	21 years, 115 days	8	9	2	Son of Alf Egan.
Bill Storer	Fitzroy	21 years, 205 days	17	9	7	
Joe Dixon	Fitzroy	22 years, 352 days	5	5	0	Father of Ben Dixon.
Allan Anderson	Fitzroy	19 years, 83 days	3	4	0	
Stan Haag	Fitzroy	20 years, 94 days	4	4	1	
Kevin Ellis	Fitzroy	18 years, 223 days	6	4	1	
Graham Goninon	Fitzroy	18 years, 129 days	18	4	0	
Barry Rippon	Fitzroy	23 years, 42 days	4	3	5	
Brian Williams	Fitzroy	26 years, 218 days	1	2	0	
Barry Sadler	Fitzroy	23 years, 24 days	12	2	0	
Geoff Doubleday	Fitzroy	23 years, 145 days	19	1	0	
George Bisset	Footscray	20 years, 41 days	1	166	288	
David Darcy	Footscray	19 years, 252 days	1	133	47	Father of Luke Darcy.
Ivan Marsh	Footscray	20 years, 99 days	17	77	33	
John Bradley	Footscray	20 years, 8 days	5	43	12	
Jack Greenwood	Footscray	19 years, 150 days	6	23	0	
Bob Gray	Footscray	20 years, 145 days	12	23	20	
Rod Coutts	Footscray	20 years, 326 days	7	16	22	
Bob Spurling	Footscray	19 years, 335 days	4	6	2	
Eddie O'Halloran	Footscray	20 years, 110 days	10	6	2	
Bob Parsons	Footscray	21 years, 143 days	4	4	0	
Col Bendelle	Footscray	19 years, 35 days	15	3	0	
Robert Schultz	Footscray	19 years, 199 days	17	2	0	
Ron Birch	Footscray	19 years, 284 days	12	1	0	
Bill Ryan	Geelong	18 years, 208 days	9	167	220	
John Sharrock	Geelong	19 years, 63 days	1	94	109	
Gordon Hynes	Geelong	18 years, 172 days	2	61	52	
Colin Eales	Geelong	18 years, 333 days	7	56	24	
John Watts	Geelong	26 years, 89 days	1	52	4	
Ian Scott	Geelong	23 years, 177 days	17	36	0	
Ross Growcott	Hawthorn	18 years, 29 days	9	53	2	
Kevin Coverdale	Hawthorn	22 years, 329 days	2	50	33	
Peter Lyon	Hawthorn	21 years, 113 days	1	16	0	Father of Garry Lyon.
Graeme McArthur	Hawthorn	18 years, 269 days	15	2	0	
Danny Hegarty	Hawthorn	18 years, 254 days	2	1	0	
Barry Bourke	Melbourne	19 years, 223 days	2	175	154	
Ray Groom	Melbourne	18 years, 229 days	1	92	36	Premier of Tasmania from 1992 to 1996.
Tony Anderson	Melbourne	21 years, 100 days	4	75	2	
Graham Wise	Melbourne	20 years, 189 days	1	40	1	
David Robbie	Melbourne	19 years, 49 days	10	21	5	
Tony Thiessen	Melbourne	20 years, 351 days	4	7	2	Father of James Thiessen.
Owen Zinko	Melbourne	18 years, 38 days	5	3	3	
Tom Allison	North Melbourne	19 years, 51 days	1	106	61	Father of Brett Allison.
Maurie Wood	North Melbourne	19 years, 55 days	2	97	77	
Terry Benton	North Melbourne	20 years, 316 days	6	77	3	Grandfather of Jaryd Cachia.
Mike Delanty	North Melbourne	26 years, 187 days	1	54	12	Previously played for Collingwood.
Bob Goode	North Melbourne	19 years, 216 days	7	20	0	
Graeme O'Donnell	North Melbourne	24 years, 310 days	6	16	18	Father of Gary O'Donnell. Previously played for Geelong.
Peter Agrums	North Melbourne	22 years, 238 days	5	11	4	
Roland Crosby	North Melbourne	19 years, 115 days	8	10	3	
Viv Peterson	North Melbourne	21 years, 065 days	1	8	8	
Bob Stewart	North Melbourne	22 years, 34 days	1	7	0	
Bob Wright	North Melbourne	20 years, 144 days	7	1	0	
Billy Brown	Richmond	20 years, 207 days	3	130	124	
John Northey	Richmond	19 years, 295 days	1	118	192	
Ross Warner	Richmond	18 years, 303 days	7	49	45	
Peter Hogan	Richmond	17 years, 143 days	1	40	57	
Owen Madigan	Richmond	19 years, 60 days	7	40	1	Previously played for Footscray.
Gary Arnold	Richmond	19 years, 171 days	6	13	7	
Rodney Evans	Richmond	17 years, 113 days	2	11	0	
Tom Garland	Richmond	20 years, 0 days	10	11	4	
Jeff Lawson	Richmond	18 years, 300 days	14	10	7	
John Caulfield	Richmond	19 years, 148 days	9	9	0	
Bob Brownhill	Richmond	19 years, 199 days	9	4	0	
Brian Lienert	Richmond	20 years, 126 days	4	2	0	
Carl Ditterich	St Kilda	17 years, 192 days	1	203	156	
Bob Murray	St Kilda	21 years, 15 days	1	153	14	
Ian Stewart	St Kilda	19 years, 280 days	1	127	25	
Daryl Griffiths	St Kilda	17 years, 214 days	8	123	40	
Jim Wallis	St Kilda	21 years, 159 days	1	39	41	
John Dowling	St Kilda	19 years, 149 days	18	37	6	
Bill Gerrand	St Kilda	21 years, 239 days	11	3	1	
Max Reed	St Kilda	20 years, 348 days	4	1	0	
John Rantall	South Melbourne	19 years, 132 days	1	260	8	
Paul Harrison	South Melbourne	18 years, 268 days	1	119	27	
Ken Phillips	South Melbourne	19 years, 230 days	4	60	28	
Des Bethke	South Melbourne	19 years, 244 days	1	56	43	
Trevor Somerville	South Melbourne	19 years, 16 days	3	49	4	Brother of John and uncle of Peter Somerville.
Gary Johnston	South Melbourne	22 years, 5 days	3	27	1	
Eric White	South Melbourne	20 years, 250 days	5	21	7	
Bill Ross	South Melbourne	19 years, 35 days	3	20	4	
Kevin Batch	South Melbourne	22 years, 54 days	15	16	0	
Bob Strachan	South Melbourne	18 years, 321 days	7	7	0	
Ron Cotton	South Melbourne	20 years, 236 days	15	4	0	
Fred Rees	South Melbourne	19 years, 334 days	2	1	0	
Jim Fuller	South Melbourne	19 years, 223 days	10	1	0	
