= Braybrook Sporting Club =

Braybrook

Names
- Full name: Braybrook Sporting Club

Club details
- Founded: 1874; 152 years ago
- Colours
- Competition: WRFL (s. 1931)
- Premierships: 19: Division 1 (1942, 1944, 1945, 1946, 1952, 1954, 1955, 1956, 1973, 1974, 1975, 1979); Division 2 (1936), (1993), (1999), Division 3 (1990), (1997), (2014), (2022),
- Ground: Pennell Reserve, Braybrook

Uniforms
Home

Other information
- Official website: braybrooksc.com

The Braybrook Sporting Club is an Australian rules football club which compete in the Western Region Football League since 1931. They are based in the Melbourne suburb of Braybrook. Their home ground is Pennell Reserve, at the corner of Burke and Cranwell Streets.

The club is not affiliated to the Essendon Football Club, but also adopts the black jumper with red sash as its primary jumper, with the reverse being utilised for jumper-clashes with similarly uniformed clubs.

Braybrook was relegated to Division 3 in 2014, when the competition split into 3 divisions from the previous 2. They remained in Division 3, despite winning the WRFL Division 3 Senior premiership in the 2014 season. The club persevered through a remarkable finals series in 2022, winning the premiership against the Wyndham Suns to see them elevated to Division 2 ahead of the 2023 season.

The Braybrook Sporting Club is now home to Men's and Women's senior football teams, Auskick programs and several netball teams across both junior and senior levels.

The club has been home to several players who have gone on to be successful at higher levels, including George Bisset, Doug Hawkins, EJ Whitten and Brian Wilson.

== History ==
Braybrook is a foundation member of the Western Region Football League (WRFL). One of the few original clubs still in the competition the club. The club's most recent senior premierships were won in 1990, 1993, 1997, 1999, 2014 and 2022. The club currently holds the record in Australia for the club that has produced the most VFL/AFL players, primarily for the Western Bulldogs (previously Footscray) based nearby.

== VFL/AFL players ==
- Lyle Anderson - Footscray
- Norm Armstrong - Footscray
- Lou Barker - Footscray
- Niels Becker - Footscray
- George Bisset - Footscray, Collingwood
- Daryl Collins - Footscray
- Dennis Collins - Footscray, Carlton
- John Cuzzupe - Footscray
- Wally Donald - Footscray
- Reg Egan - Footscray
- Ian Foreman - Footscray
- Bob Fox - Footscray
- Bob Gray - Footscray
- Robert Groenewegen - Footscray
- Wally Harris - South Melbourne, Footscray
- Doug Hawkins - Footscray, Fitzroy
- Mick Kelly - Footscray
- Del Kennedy - Footscray
- Bennie Le Sueur - Footscray, Collingwood
- Jack Logan - Footscray
- Ivan Marsh - Footscray
- Gary Merrington - Footscray
- Doug Prior - Footscray
- Albert Proud - Brisbane Lions
- Ken Scott - Footscray
- Ray Walker - Footscray
- Don Whitten - Footscray
- Ted Whitten - Footscray
- Brian Wilson - Footscray, North Melbourne, Melbourne and St Kilda
- Clive Yewers - Footscray

== Honours ==
- Western Region Football League
  - Div 1 (12): 1942, 1944, 1945, 1946, 1952, 1954, 1955, 1956, 1973, 1974, 1975, 1979
  - Div 2 (3): 1936, 1993, 1999
  - Div 3 (4): 1990, 1997, 2014, 2022

== Bibliography ==
- History of the WRFL/FDFL by Kevin Hillier – ISBN 9781863356015
- History of football in Melbourne's north west by John Stoward – ISBN 9780980592924
