= 2011 in Australia =

- Monarch: Elizabeth II
- Governor-General: Quentin Bryce
- Prime minister: Julia Gillard
- Elections: NSW

The following lists events that happened during 2011 in Australia.

- Decades: 1990s; 2000s; 2010s; 2020s; 2030s
- See also: 2011 in Australian television; 2011 in Australian literature; Other events of 2011; Timeline of Australian history

== Incumbents ==
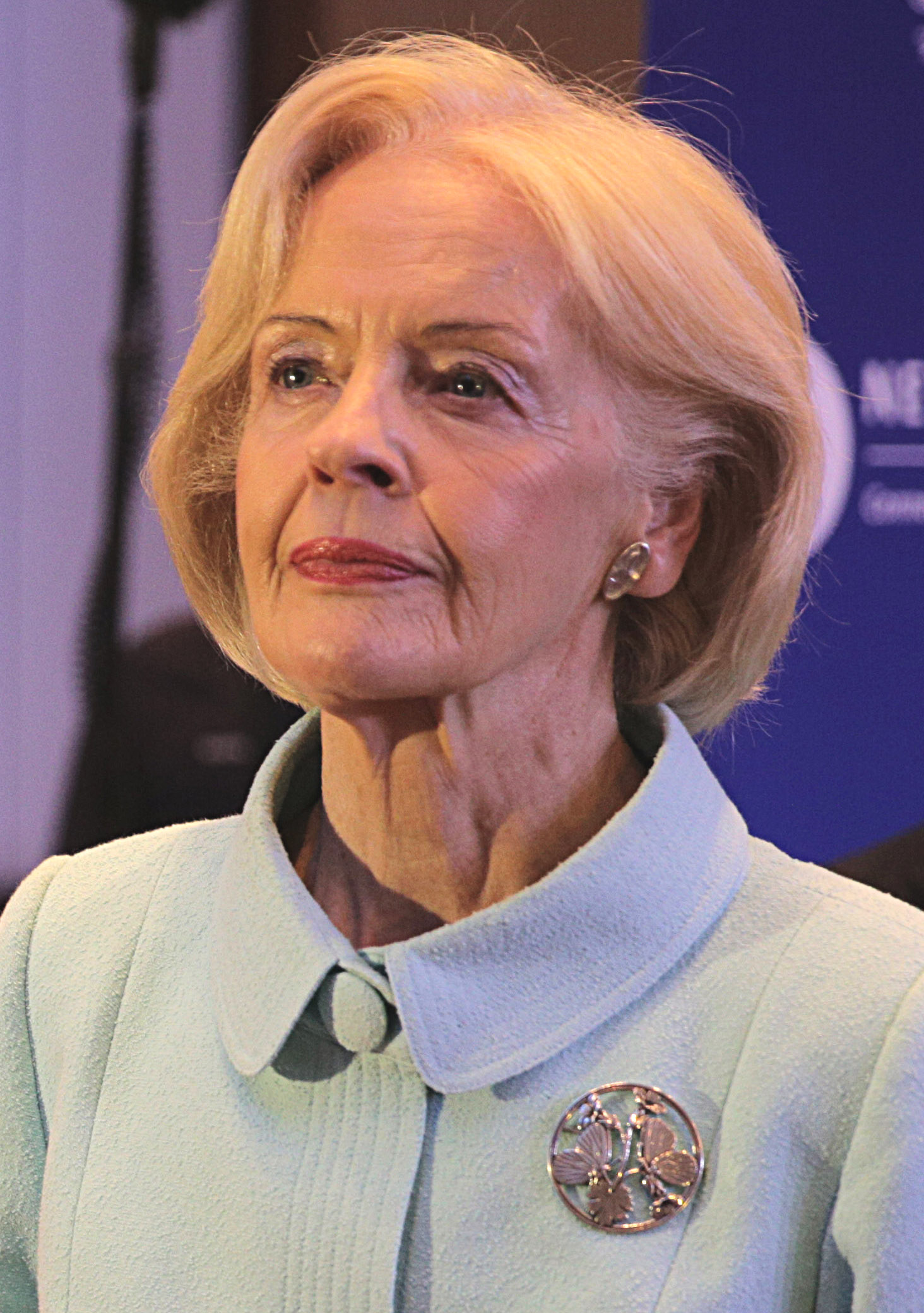
Quentin Bryce

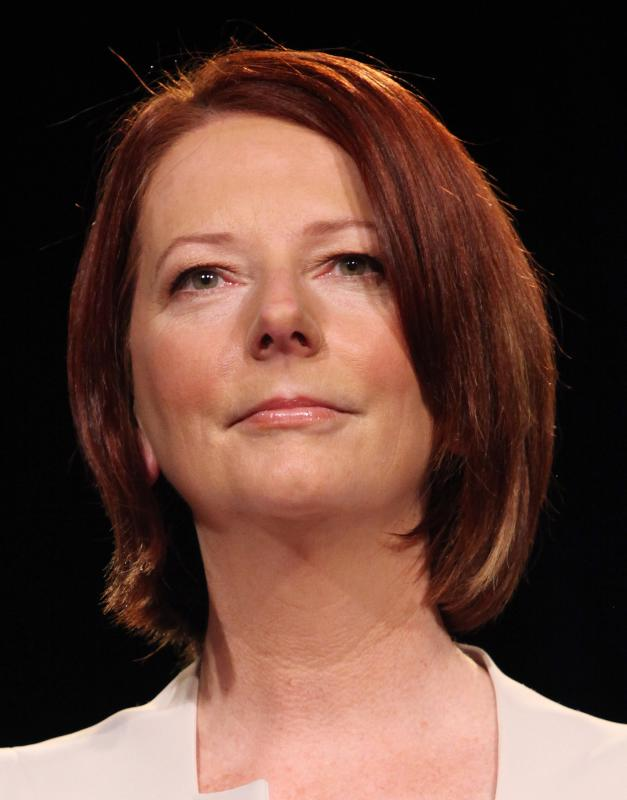
Julia Gillard

- Monarch – Elizabeth II
- Governor-General – Quentin Bryce
- Prime Minister – Julia Gillard
  - Deputy Prime Minister – Wayne Swan
  - Opposition Leader – Tony Abbott
- Chief Justice – Robert French

=== State and territory leaders ===
- Premier of New South Wales – Kristina Keneally (until 28 March), then Barry O'Farrell
  - Opposition Leader – Barry O'Farrell (until 28 March), then John Robertson
- Premier of Queensland – Anna Bligh
  - Opposition Leader – John-Paul Langbroek (until 11 April), then Jeff Seeney
- Premier of South Australia – Mike Rann (until 21 October), then Jay Weatherill
  - Opposition Leader – Isobel Redmond
- Premier of Tasmania – David Bartlett (until 23 January), then Lara Giddings
  - Opposition Leader – Will Hodgman
- Premier of Victoria – Ted Baillieu
  - Opposition Leader – Daniel Andrews
- Premier of Western Australia – Colin Barnett
  - Opposition Leader – Eric Ripper
- Chief Minister of the Australian Capital Territory – Jon Stanhope (until 12 May), then Katy Gallagher
  - Opposition Leader – Zed Seselja
- Chief Minister of the Northern Territory – Paul Henderson
  - Opposition Leader – Terry Mills
- Chief Minister of Norfolk Island – David Buffett

=== Governors and administrators ===
- Governor of New South Wales – Marie Bashir
- Governor of Queensland – Penelope Wensley
- Governor of South Australia – Kevin Scarce
- Governor of Tasmania – Peter Underwood
- Governor of Victoria – David de Kretser (until 7 April), then Alex Chernov
- Governor of Western Australia – Ken Michael (until 2 May), then Malcolm McCusker
- Administrator of the Australian Indian Ocean Territories – Brian Lacy
- Administrator of Norfolk Island – Owen Walsh
- Administrator of the Northern Territory – Tom Pauling (until 31 October), then Sally Thomas

== Events ==
=== January ===
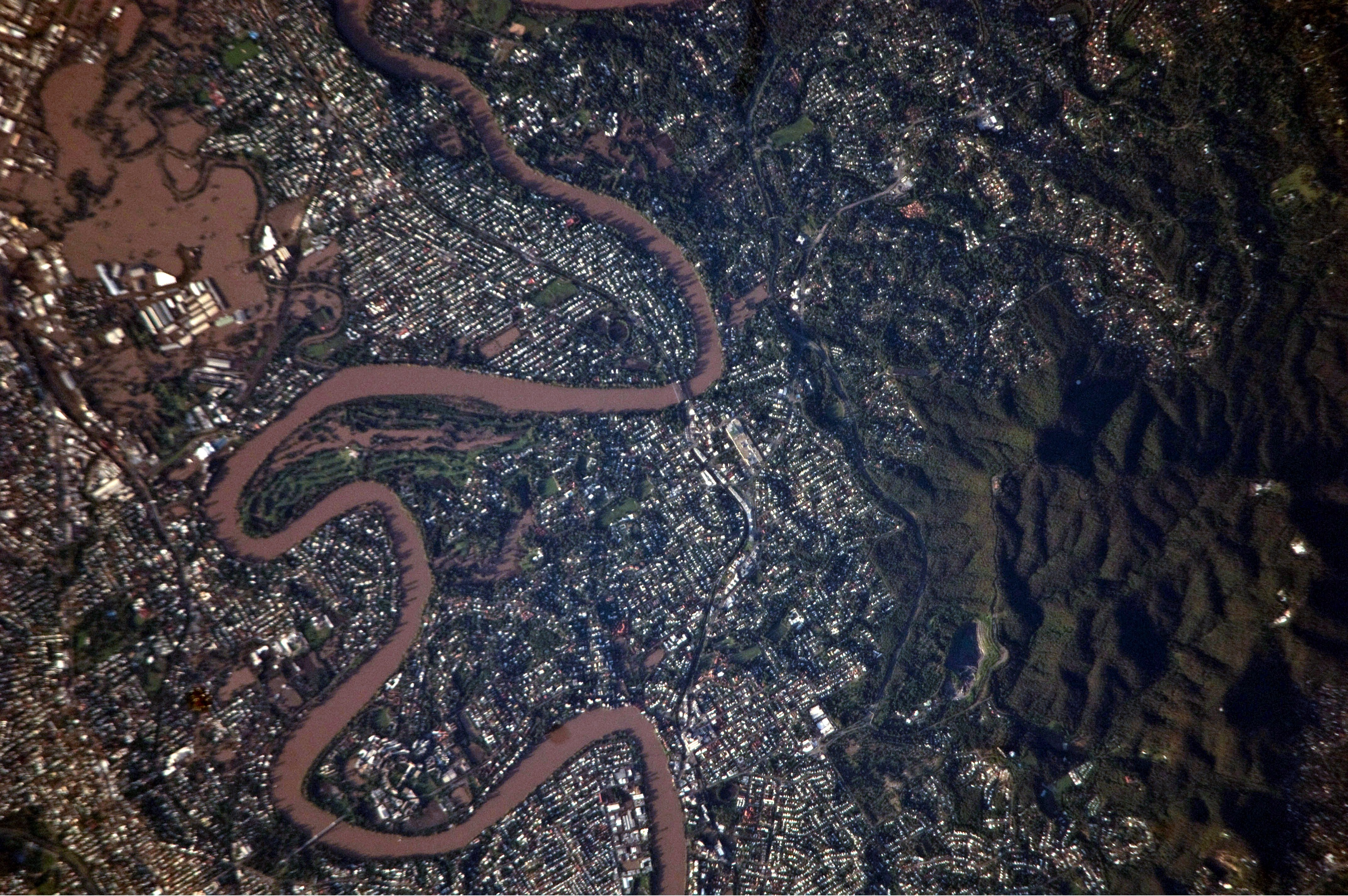
This detailed astronaut photograph illustrates flooding in suburbs of the Brisbane area.

- December 2010 to January 2011 – Flooding across Queensland continues, the most widespread flooding disaster in Queensland history. The Toowoomba and Lockyer Valley regions are severely affected by floodwaters on 10 January, which would later lead to flooding in the Ipswich and Brisbane regions.
- 10 January – A large bushfire threatens the area of Lake Clifton, Western Australia, about 100 km south of Perth.
- 13 January – 278 millimetres (10.9 in) of rain falls in 24 hours at Scamander in north east Tasmania leads to flash flooding in the town, along with St Helens.
- 14 January – Major floods occur across much of western and central Victoria totally inundating the town of Carisbrook and causing evacuations in many others.
- 17 January – The Commission of Inquiry into the 2010–11 Queensland floods is established to investigate matters related to the Queensland floods.
- 23 January – Corporal Ben Roberts-Smith of the Special Air Service Regiment is awarded the Victoria Cross for Australia for his actions in the Shah Wali Kot Offensive in June 2010, part of the War in Afghanistan.
- 23 January – David Bartlett announces his resignation as Premier of Tasmania citing a desire to spend more time with his family.
- 27 January – Prime Minister Julia Gillard announces that her government proposes to introduce a Flood levy to assist in funding reconstruction works required as a result of major floods in Queensland and Victoria.
- 30 January – Tropical Cyclone Anthony makes landfall near Bowen in Queensland's north, bringing wind gusts of up to 155 kilometres per hour (96 mph).

=== February ===
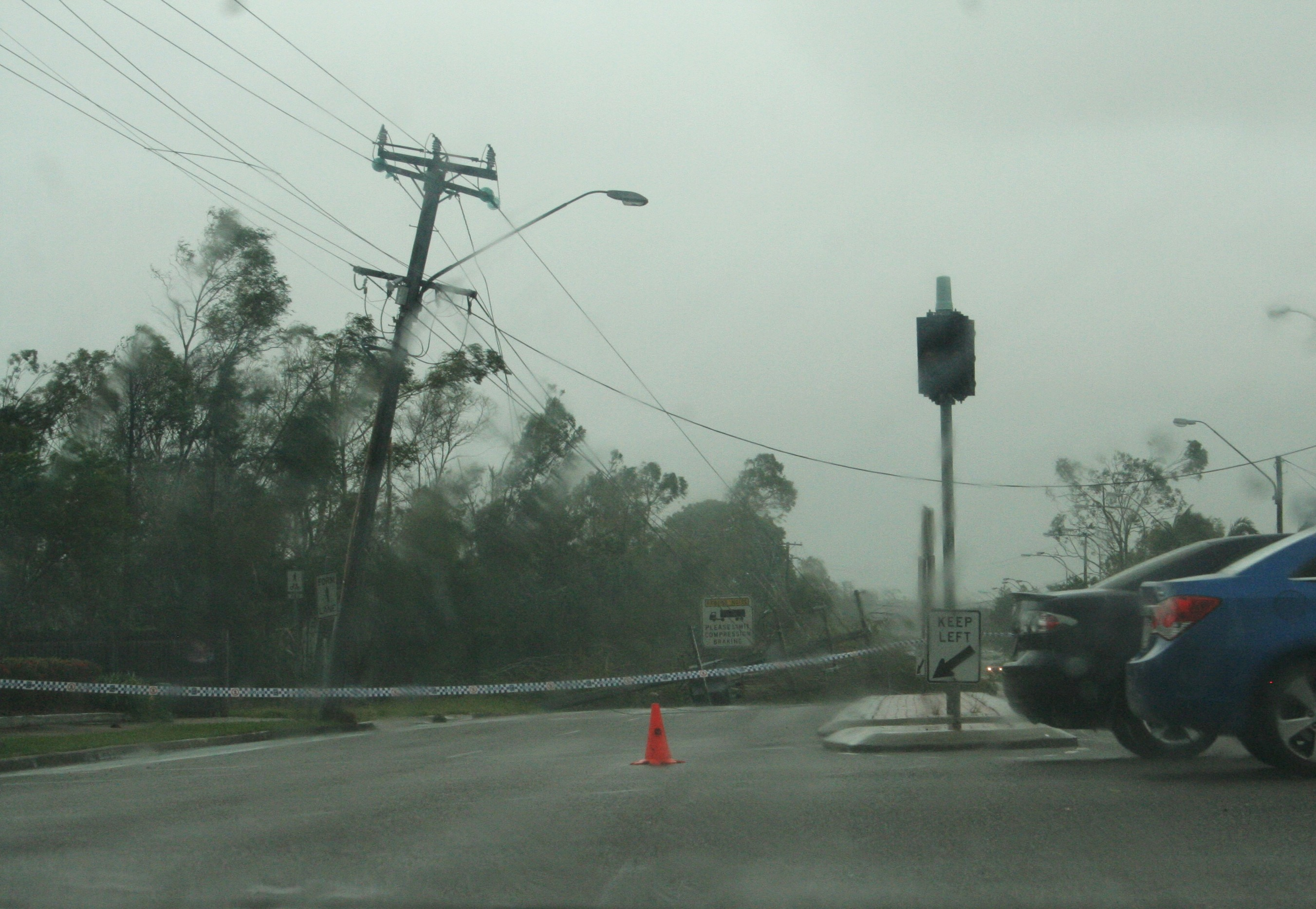
Downed power pole and lines in Townsville, Queensland

- 3 February – Severe Tropical Cyclone Yasi makes landfall at near Mission Beach, south of Innisfail, Queensland.
- 4–5 February – Severe thunderstorms related to Tropical Cyclone Anthony affect much of Victoria. Flash flooding affected many places across the state including Mildura in the state's north west and the south eastern suburbs of Melbourne. The town of Koo Wee Rup was evacuated when the Bunyip River reached a height of 7.2 metres (24 ft).
- 6–7 February – Bushfires in Perth destroy at least 50 houses.
- 17 February – REDGroup Retail (including the Borders and Angus & Robertson bookshop chains) is placed into voluntary administration with Ferrier Hodgson appointed as administrators.
- 24 February – Prime Minister Julia Gillard announced that the Federal Government proposed to introduce a carbon pricing scheme by 1 July 2012. Federal Opposition Leader Tony Abbott claims that Gillard broke a promise made during the 2010 Federal election campaign not to introduce a carbon tax.
- 24 February – AFACT loses its appeal to the Federal Court of Australia affirming that iiNet was not liable for the illegal downloading and peer-to-peer file sharing of films and television programs by its users.

=== March ===
- 3 March – The temperature in Perth reaches above 30 degrees for the 26th consecutive day, making it the longest recorded heatwave in the city, beating the previous record set in 1988.
- 26 March – A state election is held in New South Wales. Kristina Keneally's Labor government is defeated by Barry O'Farrell's Liberal-National Coalition.

=== April ===
- 19 April – Floodwaters inundate around 100 houses in the western Queensland town of Roma.
- 20 April – Asylum seekers at Sydney's Villawood Detention Centre riot in protest over delays in processing their applications for asylum, burning down at least three buildings.

=== May ===
- 4 May – Virgin Blue Airlines is renamed and rebranded as Virgin Australia.
- 11 May – While waiting for an elevator at an undercover carpark at Highpoint Shopping Centre Ashgrove an out-of-control vehicle slams into Alison France, the 38-year-old daughter of state MP Peter Lawlor. After pushing her son's stroller out the way before impact, France becomes pinned between two cars. The accident results in France's left leg being amputated above the knee.
- 16 May – The Australian Capital Territory Legislative Assembly elects Katy Gallagher as Chief Minister, following the resignation of Jon Stanhope on 12 May.
- 29 May 2011: Detective Senior Constable Damien Leeding (CIB) was shot when he confronted an armed offender at the Pacific Pines Tavern on the Gold Coast. Leeding died in hospital on 1 June three days after being shot.

=== June ===
- 5 June – Say Yes demonstrations occur in numerous cities across Australia in support of political action on climate change.
- 11 June – Hundreds of flights are suspended following the ash cloud from an eruption in the Puyehue-Cordón Caulle volcano complex in Chile reaching southern Australia.
- 16 June – A report by the Victorian Ombudsman criticises the Chief Commissioner of Victoria Police Simon Overland's publication of "misleading" crime statistics in the lead-up to the 2010 State election. Overland subsequently resigns as Chief Commissioner.

=== July ===
- 25 July – The Gillard government signs off on an arrangement with Malaysia that will see Australia deport 800 asylum seekers to that country in return for resettling 4000 refugees verified by the United Nations High Commissioner for Refugees.

=== August ===
- 8 August – A High Court judge orders the government's "Malaysia Solution" to send asylum seekers to Malaysia be put on hold until the full bench of the High Court could assess the scheme's legality.
- 9 August – The 2011 Census of Population and Housing is held.
- 28 August – Queensland Police confirm that bones found in bushland on the Sunshine Coast are those of missing teenager Daniel Morcombe. Morcombe had been missing since 2003
- 31 August – The High Court of Australia rules the Gillard government's "Malaysia Solution" for the processing of asylum-seekers is unlawful.

=== September ===
- 1 September – Forensic experts confirm that the remains of a person found on the grounds of the former HM Prison Pentridge are those of bushranger Ned Kelly.
- 28 September – Eatock v Bolt Justice Mordecai Bromberg founds conservative political commentator Andrew Bolt to have contravened section 18C of the Racial Discrimination Act. The case was controversial. Bolt described the decision as a "terrible day for free speech" in Australia and said it represented "a restriction on the freedom of all Australians to discuss multiculturalism and how people identify themselves. I argued then and I argue now that we should not insist on the differences between us but focus instead on what unites us as human beings."

=== October ===
- 19 to 29 October – Queen Elizabeth and Prince Philip visit Canberra, Perth, Brisbane and Melbourne.
- 21 October – Mike Rann stands down as Premier of South Australia after losing party support, and is replaced by Jay Weatherill.
- 21 October – Victoria Police officers forcibly remove Occupy Melbourne protesters from Melbourne's City Square.
- 28 to 30 October – the Commonwealth Heads of Government Meeting is held in Perth.
- 29 October – In response to industrial action by pilots, ground staff and engineers, Qantas grounds its entire international and domestic fleet.
- 31 October – Fair Work Australia orders the termination of all industrial action taken by Qantas and the involved trade unions. Qantas flights resume on the afternoon of that day.

=== November ===
- 16 November – The President of the United States Barack Obama visits Australia to commemorate the 60th anniversary of the ANZUS alliance.
- 24 November – Harry Jenkins resigns as Speaker of the House of Representatives. Peter Slipper is elected in his place.
- 25 November – 34 homes are destroyed in Margaret River, Western Australia when a prescribed burn by the Department of Environment and Conservation had "gone wrong" and "escaped" into bushland.
- 30 November – Legislative Assembly of Queensland passed a bill allowing civil partnerships for same-sex couples in Queensland; a similar legislation already exists in Tasmania, Victoria, the ACT and NSW.

=== December ===
- 18 December – A boat sailing from Indonesia carrying over 200 asylum seekers sinks off the coast of Java while heading for Christmas Island. At least 160 people are feared dead.

== Arts and literature ==
- 27 April – Andrew Ruhemann and Shaun Tan are awarded the Academy Award for Best Animated Short Film at the 83rd Academy Awards for their film The Lost Thing.
- 15 April – Ben Quilty is awarded the Archibald Prize for his portrait of Margaret Olley. The Wynne Prize was awarded to Richard Goodwin for Co-isolated slave and the Sulman Prize was awarded to Peter Smeeth for The artist's fate.
- 17 August – The National Gallery of Victoria announces it has acquired Madonna and Child with the infant Saint John the Baptist by Italian High Renaissance painter Antonio da Correggio. Purchased at auction for £3.2 million ($5.2 million), it is the most expensive acquisition in the 150-year history of the NGV.

== Science and technology ==
- 15 September – Researchers from Monash University announce the identification of a new dolphin species, the Burrunan dolphin (Tursiops australis), in Victoria's Port Phillip and Gippsland Lakes.
- 4 October – American-born astrophysicist Brian Schmidt was awarded the 2011 Nobel Prize for Physics for his discovery of the increasing acceleration of the expansion of the universe. A professor at the Australian National University, Schmidt shared the award with Adam Riess and Saul Perlmutter.

== Sport ==
- 7 January – Cricket: England wins The Ashes series 3–1 over Australia.
- 29 January – Tennis: Kim Clijsters wins the women's singles title at the 2011 Australian Open, defeating Li Na.
- 29 January – Soccer: Australia is defeated 1–0 in extra time by Japan in the final of the 2011 AFC Asian Cup in Qatar.
- 30 January – Tennis: Novak Djokovic wins the men's singles title at the 2011 Australian Open, defeating Andy Murray.
- 7 February – Cricket: Shane Watson wins the Allan Border Medal for the second year in a row.
- 12 February – Rugby League: The 2011 All Stars match is held at Skilled Park, with the NRL All Stars defeating the Indigenous All Stars 28–12. NRL fullback Josh Dugan of the Canberra Raiders wins the Preston Campbell award for Man of the Match. Preceding the game was the inaugural Women's All Stars match, which the NRL team also won 22–6.
- 27 February – Rugby League: 2010 NRL premiers the St. George Illawarra Dragons defeat Super League XV champions the Wigan Warriors 21–15 in the 2011 World Club Challenge, held in Wigan.
- 1 March – Soccer: North Queensland Fury are dropped from the A-League, after being unable to meet the financial requirements of Football Federation Australia.
- 13 March – Basketball: Bulleen Boomers defeat Canberra Capitals 103–78 to win the 2010–11 Women's National Basketball League championship.
- 13 March – Soccer: Brisbane Roar FC defeat Central Coast Mariners FC 4–2 on penalties (2–2 after extra time) to win the 2010–11 A-League Championship. Brisbane win the Premiership/Championship double.
- 21 March – Cricket: Tasmania win their second Sheffield Shield, beating New South Wales by seven wickets at Bellerive Oval.
- 27 March – Motor racing: German driver Sebastian Vettel win the 2011 Australian Grand Prix for Red Bull Racing, finishing 22 seconds ahead of British driver Lewis Hamilton.
- 29 April – Basketball: New Zealand Breakers defeat Cairns Taipans 71–53 in the deciding game of the 2010–11 NBL Grand Final series. The Breakers become the first New Zealand team to win an NBL championship.
- 22 May – Netball: The Queensland Firebirds win the 2011 ANZ Championship defeating the Northern Mystics 57–44 in the Grand Final at Brisbane.
- 6 July – Rugby league: Queensland win a record sixth consecutive Rugby League State of Origin title, defeating New South Wales 34–24 in front of 52,498 fans at Lang Park to win the series by two matches to one.
- 9 July – Rugby union: Queensland win the 2011 Super Rugby championship, defeating the Christchurch-based Crusaders 18–13 in front of 52,116 fans at Lang Park; a record crowd for Australian provincial rugby.
- 10 July – Netball: Australia win the 2011 Netball World Championships held in Singapore, defeating New Zealand 58–57 after extra time.
- 10 July – Soccer: The Matildas—the Australian women's football team—is knocked out of the 2011 FIFA Women's World Cup at the quarter-final stage, defeated by Sweden 3–1 in Augsburg.
- 24 July – Cycling: Cadel Evans wins the 2011 Tour de France. Evans is the first Australian to win the Tour de France.
- 30 July – Australian rules football: Geelong hands Melbourne the second worst marginal defeat in AFL/VFL history, winning by 186 points. Twenty-four hours after the siren blew at Kardinia Park, Dean Bailey was sacked as Demons coach after three and a half seasons at the helm.
- 3 September – Athletics: Sally Pearson wins the Women's 100 metres hurdles at the 2011 World Championships in Athletics at Daegu, South Korea.
- 4 September – Rugby League: The Melbourne Storm win their first legitimate minor premiership following the final main round of the 2011 NRL season. The Gold Coast Titans finish in last position, claiming the wooden spoon.
- 12 September – Tennis: Samantha Stosur wins the 2011 US Open, her first Grand Slam singles title.
- 26 September – Australian rules football: Dane Swan (Collingwood) wins the 2011 Brownlow Medal.
- 1 October – Australian rules football: Geelong wins the 2011 AFL Grand Final, defeating Collingwood 18.11 (119) to 12.9 (81).
- 2 October – Rugby league: The Manly-Warringah Sea Eagles win the 2011 NRL Grand Final, defeating the New Zealand Warriors 24–10. It is the Sea Eagles' most recent premiership win.
- 9 October – Motor racing: Garth Tander and Nick Percat, driving for the Holden Racing Team, win the 2011 Bathurst 1000.
- 22 October – Horse racing: Pinker Pinker wins the Cox Plate at Moonee Valley.
- 1 November – Horse racing: Dunaden, ridden by Christophe Lemaire and trained by Mikel Delzangles, wins the 2011 Melbourne Cup. The French-trained horse won in a photo finish over Red Cadeaux—the narrowest victory in the history of the race.
- 12 November – Commonwealth Games: The Gold Coast is announced as the host of the 2018 Commonwealth Games.
- 12 November – Athletics: Sally Pearson was named as the woman IAAF World Athlete of the Year for 2011.

== Births ==
- 1 March - Diesel La Torraca, actor

== Deaths ==
- 1 January – Sonia Humphrey, 63, television presenter and journalist
- 2 January – Robert Trumble, 91, writer and musician
- 9 January – Ernest Henry Lee-Steere, 98, businessman
- 9 January – Makinti Napanangka, late 1980s, Australian Papunya Tula artist
- 13 January – Mick Cremin, 87, rugby union player
- 15 January – Harvey James, 58, guitarist with Sherbet
- 17 January – Steve Prestwich, 56, drummer with Cold Chisel
- 18 January – Duncan Hall, 85, rugby league footballer
- 24 January – Peter Gibb, 56, criminal, prison escapee
- 2 February – Darrel Baldock, 72, Australian rules footballer, politician
- 7 February – Frank Roberts, 65, boxer, first Indigenous Olympian
- 12 February – James Elliott, 82, actor (Number 96)
- 21 February – Dick Klugman, 87, politician
- 6 March – Patricia Brennan, 66, advocate for the ordination of women
- 9 March – Des Meagher, 67, Australian rules footballer
- 13 March – Owsley Stanley, 76, counter-cultural figure
- 19 March – Kym Bonython, 90, arts identity
- 20 March – Bob Christo, 72, Bollywood actor
- 28 March – Esben Storm, 60, actor, producer and director
- 31 March – Tony Barrell, 70, broadcaster
- 31 March – Alan Fitzgerald, 75, journalist and satirist
- 8 April – David S. Clarke, 69, businessman and winemaker
- 8 April – Donald Shanks, 70, bass-baritone opera singer
- 11 April – John D'Orazio, 55, politician
- 11 April – Peter Ruehl, 64, columnist
- 13 April – Alan Noonan, 63, Australian rules footballer
- 17 April – Eric Gross, 84, composer
- 17 April – Blair Milan, 29, actor and television presenter
- 23 April – Dutch Tilders, 69, musician
- 5 May – Claude Choules, 110, last surviving combat World War I veteran
- 6 May – Barry Connolly, 72, Australian rules footballer
- 8 May – Lionel Rose, 62, boxer
- 16 May – Bob Davis, 82, Australian rules footballer
- 20 May – Ivan Gibbs, 83, Queensland politician
- 21 May – Bill Hunter, 71, actor
- 22 May – Ralph Hunt, 83, politician
- 23 May – Sam Faust, 26, rugby league player
- 25 May – Terry Jenner, 66, cricketer
- 29 May – Jon Blake, 52, actor
- 29 May – Bill Roycroft, 96, equestrian
- 1 June – Frank Ponta, 75, paralympian
- 17 June – David Brockhoff, 83, rugby union player and coach
- 17 June – Rex Mossop, 83, rugby league and rugby union player and television personality
- 19 June – Tom Hungerford, 96, author and playwright
- 23 June – Len King, 88, politician and judge
- 30 June – Tom Kruse, 96, Outback mailman and documentary subject
- 30 June – Sean Wight, 47, Australian rules footballer (Melbourne)
- 6 July – Carly Hibberd, 26, Australian road racing cyclist
- 12 July – Allan Jeans, 77, Australian rules footballer and coach
- 15 July – Googie Withers, 94, actress
- 17 July – David Ngoombujarra, 44, actor
- 21 July – Ashleigh Connor, 21, soccer player
- 24 July – Ron Davies, 85, Western Australian politician
- 26 July – Margaret Olley, 88, artist
- 31 July – Clyde Holding, 80, politician
- 5 August – Aziz Shavershian, 22, bodybuilder
- 7 August – Nancy Wake, 98, World War II resistance fighter (died in England)
- 11 August – Karen Overington, 59, politician
- 18 August – Paul Lockyer, 61, journalist
- 18 August – John Abley, 80, Australian rules footballer
- 18 August – Brian Harrison, 79, politician
- 19 August – Merv Brooks, 92, Australian rules footballer
- 25 August – Elliott Johnston, 93, judge
- 31 August – Denis Collins, 58, Australian rules footballer
- 7 September – Harold Mair, 92, politician
- 11 September – Andy Whitfield, 39, actor (Spartacus: Blood and Sand)
- 13 September – David Jull, 66, politician
- 16 September – Ted Mullighan, 72, South Australian Supreme Court judge
- 17 September – Colin Madigan, 90, architect
- 29 September – Miriam Schmierer, 112, Australia's oldest living person and last known surviving Australian born in the 19th Century
- 1 October – Ruby Langford Ginibi, 77, author and Aboriginal historian
- 7 October – Diane Cilento, 78, actor
- 12 October – Dick Thornett, 71, water polo, rugby league and rugby union player
- 15 October – Sir Donald Dunstan, 88, military officer, Governor of South Australia (1982–1991)
- 17 October – Elaine Nile, 75, politician
- 18 October – George Chaloupka, 79, Aboriginal rock art expert
- 19 October – Keith Williams, 82, tourism property developer
- 20 October – Hunter, 36, rapper
- 24 October – Robert Bropho, 81, Aboriginal rights activist
- 4 November – Sarah Watt, 53, film director
- 10 November – David Boyd, 87, artist
- 13 November – Peter Roebuck, 55, cricketer and journalist (died in South Africa)
- 25 November – John Blades, 51, experimental musician
- 25 November – Dane Searls, 23, BMX rider
- 1 December – Arthur Beetson, 66, Rugby League footballer, first Indigenous Australian to captain a national team in any sport
- 3 December – Sam Loxton, 90, cricketer, footballer and politician
- 4 December – RJ Rosales, 37, actor
- 8 December – Sir Zelman Cowen, 92, 19th Governor-General of Australia
- 11 December – Harold Hopkins, 67, actor
- 15 December – Jason Richards, 35, motor racing driver
- 18 December – Jeremy Doyle, 28, wheelchair basketballer
- 22 December – Bruce Ruxton, 85, former President of the Victorian Returned and Services League.
- 31 December – Murray Barnes, 57, soccer player (Sydney Hakoah), national captain (1980–1981).
- 31 December – Rex Jackson, 83, politician and convicted criminal.

== See also ==
- 2011 in Australian literature
- 2011 in Australian television
- List of Australian films of 2011
