= Bill Gerrand =

Bill Gerrand may refer to:

- Bill Gerrand (footballer, born 1916) (1916–2000), Australian rules footballer for North Melbourne
- Bill Gerrand (footballer, born 1941) (1941 born), Australian rules footballer for St Kilda

== See also ==
- Gerrand, a surname
