= Wally Harris =

Wally Harris may refer to:

- Wally Harris (Australian footballer) (1919–2001), Australian rules footballer
- Wally Harris (English footballer) (1900–1933), English professional footballer
- Wally Harris (referee) (1935–2024), National Hockey League referee

== See also ==
- Walter Harris (disambiguation)
