= Robert Strachan =

Robert Strachan may refer to:

- Robert Strachan (politician) (1913–1981), Canadian trade unionist and politician
- Bob Strachan (footballer, born 1886) (1886–1927), Australian rules footballer for Collingwood
- Bob Strachan (footballer, born 1944), Australian rules footballer for South Melbourne
- R. Kenneth Strachan (1910–1965), missionary
- Harold Strachan (Robert Harold Lundie Strachan, 1925–2010), South African writer and anti-apartheid activist
