= Walter Harris =

Walter Harris may refer to:

== Arts, entertainment, and media ==
- Walter Harris (author) (1925–2019), British author and broadcaster
- Walter Harris (artist) (1931–2009), Canadian artist
- Walter Burton Harris (1866–1933), English journalist, writer, traveller and socialite
- Pee-Wee Harris (Walter Harris), a fictional character in Boys' Life comics

== Sports ==
=== American football ===
- Walt Harris (cornerback) (born 1974), American football cornerback
- Walt Harris (defensive back) (born 1964), American football defensive back
- Walt Harris (American football coach) (born 1946), former American football player and coach

=== Other sports ===
- Walter Harris (chess player) (1941–2024), American chess player
- Walter Harris (football manager), English football manager
- Walt Harris (fighter) (born 1983), American mixed martial artist
- Wally Harris (Australian footballer) (Walter Ronald Harris, 1919–2001), Australian rules footballer

== Others ==
- Walter Edward Harris (1904–1999), Canadian politician
- Walter Edgar Harris (1915–2011), Canadian chemist
- Walter Harris (historian) (1686–1761), Irish historian
- Walter Alexander Harris (1875–1958), lawyer, writer, and U.S. Army officer
- Walter Harris (physician), English physician

== See also ==
- Wally Harris (disambiguation)
- Walter Harris Loveys (1920–1969), British politician
