= Eric White =

Eric White may refer to:

- Eric White (basketball) (born 1965), American basketball player
- Eric White (artist) (born 1968), American artist
- Eric White (footballer) (born 1942), Australian rules footballer
- Eric Foster White (born 1962), American songwriter, record producer, and musician
- Eric Wyndham White (1913–1980), British economist
- Eric Winston White (born 1958), English footballer
- Eric White (pole vaulter) (born 1964), American pole vaulter, 1987 All-American for the USC Trojans track and field team
- Eric White, actor in Something More!

== See also ==
- Erik White, American film and music video director
