= Gerrand =

Gerrand is the surname of the following people:

- Bill Gerrand (footballer, born 1916) (1916–2000), Australian rules footballer
- Bill Gerrand (footballer, born 1941) (born 1941), Australian rules footballer
- Ernest Walter Gerrand (1884–1970), Canadian politician in Saskatchewan
- Tess Gerrand (born 1988), Australian rower
