= Robert Groenewegen =

Australian rules footballer, born 1960

Personal information
- Born: 4 August 1960 (age 66)
- Original team: Braybrook
- Height: 193 cm (6 ft 4 in)
- Weight: 86 kg (190 lb)

Playing career^{1}
Years	Club	Games (Goals)
1978–1986	Footscray	79 (29)
- ^{1} Playing statistics correct to the end of 1986.

Robert Groenewegen (born 4 August 1960) is a former Australian rules footballer who played 79 matches for the Footscray Football Club between 1978 and 1986, kicking a total of 29 goals in his Victorian Football League (VFL) career. He was recruited from Braybrook.

Predominantly wearing the number 14 guernsey throughout his career. He is now the ground manager at Aurora Stadium in Launceston which hosts several AFL matches every year.
