= Jack Collins (footballer, born 1925) =

Australian rules footballer (1925–1998)

Personal information
- Full name: Jack Cecil Collins
- Born: 9 May 1925
- Died: 4 January 1998 (aged 72)
- Original team: Fitzroy Sub-District
- Debut: Round 4, 1945, Fitzroy vs. Carlton, at Princes Park
- Height: 178 cm (5 ft 10 in)
- Weight: 82 kg (181 lb)

Playing career^{1}
Years	Club	Games (Goals)
1945–1949	Fitzroy	31 (36)
1950	Essendon	13 (1)
1951-52	Finley NSW	unknown
1953-54	unknown	unknown
1955	Sorrento	12 (unknown)
1955	Footscray Seconds	half a season (unknown)
Total		56 (37)
- ^{1} Playing statistics correct to the end of 1950.

Career highlights
- 1950 Essendon premiership * 1952 Finley premiership (captain-coach 1951-52)

Jack Cecil Collins (9 May 1925 – 4 January 1998) was an Australian rules footballer who played for the Fitzroy Football Club and Essendon Football Club in the Victorian Football League (VFL).

Collins, who was recruited locally to Fitzroy, kicked seven goals in a game against St Kilda at Brunswick Street in his debut season. He was a talented wingman who came from Fitzroy where he played 31 games from 1945 to 1949. Prior to that he was with Fitzroy Sub Districts.

He was speedy and his powerful left-foot kicks, usually delivered quickly after a swerving run, proved a source of drive.

He played 13 games in 1950 and was on the wing in the premiership win Grand Final.

Collins didn't always see eye to eye with the Essendon hierarchy and there was disappointment when he did not return in 1951.

He was cleared to Finley in New South Wales where he was captain-coach in 1951 and 1952 winning a premiership in the second year. He then played with Sorrento in 1953 and 1954 (Sorrento FC records show he played 12 games in 1955) and had half a season with Footscray Seconds in 1955.

His sons Daryl and Denis both played in the VFL during the 1970s. Daryl played one game for Footscray in 1974, and Dennis played a combined total of 147 games for Footscray, Carlton and Richmond (1972-1980).
