= Denis Collins (footballer) =

Australian rules footballer (1953–2011)

Personal information
- Full name: Denis Collins
- Born: 17 May 1953; Braybrook, Victoria
- Died: 31 August 2011 (aged 58); Hyden, Western Australia
- Original team: Braybrook (FDFL)
- Height: 178 cm (5 ft 10 in)
- Weight: 78 kg (172 lb)

Playing career^{1}
Years	Club	Games (Goals)
1972–1977	Footscray	100 (60)
1978–1979	Carlton	30 (12)
1980	Richmond	17 (2)
Total		147 (74)
- ^{1} Playing statistics correct to the end of 1980.

Denis Collins (17 May 1953 – 31 August 2011) was an Australian rules footballer who played for Footscray, Carlton and Richmond in the Victorian Football League (VFL).

After arriving from Braybrook, Collins became a regular fixture in the Footscray side for six seasons. A pacy wingman, he was also used as a half forward and rover during his career. He averaged a career high 19 disposals from his 20 games in 1977 but it would be his final season at Footscray. While at Footscray he was joined briefly by his brother Daryl and the two of them played together in the opening round of the 1974 season.

Collins made 21 appearances for Carlton in 1978 and took part in his second finals series, having played an elimination final with Footscray. In the last round of the home and away season he was famously felled by Robbie Muir. Collins came up behind him and ruffled his hair, to which the St Kilda player responded by flinging back his forearm and striking Collins on the jaw. In the Brownlow Medal count later that year, Collins was Carlton's best performed with 12 votes.

Dissatisfied after spending much of the 1979 season in the reserves and missing out on playing in Carlton's 1979 premiership team, Collins was granted a clearance to Richmond in 1980. Although he made 17 appearances in 1980, including a qualifying final win over his former club Carlton, Collins was only an emergency for the VFL Grand Final, which Richmond won. Collins was set to be named on the bench for the Grand Final, but missed an appointment with the club psychologist the Thursday before the game. As a result, coach Tony Jewell dropped him from the side and played Daryl Freame instead.

Collins retired from the VFL after the 1980 season and soon after moved to Western Australia where he played for East Perth in the West Australian Football League.

He was the son of Essendon premiership player Jack Collins.

Collins died of a heart attack on 31 August 2011 in the Western Australian town of Hyden. He was 58 years old.
