= John Cuzzupe =

Australian rules footballer

Personal information
- Full name: John Cuzzupe
- Born: 11 October 1973 (age 53)
- Original teams: Braybrook, (FDFL)
- Height: 176 cm (5 ft 9 in)
- Weight: 74 kg (163 lb)

Playing career^{1}
Years	Club	Games (Goals)
1992	Footscray	1 (0)
- ^{1} Playing statistics correct to the end of 1992.

John Cuzzupe (born 11 October 1973) is a former Australian rules footballer who played for Footscray in the Australian Football League (AFL) in 1992. He was recruited from the Braybrook Football Club in the Footscray District Football League (FDFL). Player at Parkside Football Club in 1997.
