= Ken Scott (Australian footballer) =

Australian rules footballer

Personal information
- Full name: Kenneth Harden Scott
- Born: 11 April 1926
- Died: 2 July 2012 (aged 86)
- Original team: Braybrook
- Height: 182 cm (6 ft 0 in)
- Weight: 85 kg (187 lb)

Playing career^{1}
Years	Club	Games (Goals)
1946–47	Footscray	13 (3)
- ^{1} Playing statistics correct to the end of 1947.

Kenneth Harden Scott (11 April 1926 – 2 July 2012) was an Australian rules footballer who played with Footscray in the Victorian Football League (VFL).
