= Ivan Marsh =

Australian rules footballer

Personal information
- Full name: Ivan Manton Marsh
- Born: 24 May 1943
- Died: 20 September 2025 (aged 82)
- Original team: Braybrook (WRFL)
- Height: 185 cm (6 ft 1 in)
- Weight: 84 kg (185 lb)
- Position: Ruck

Playing career^{1}
Years	Club	Games (Goals)
1963–69	Footscray	77 (33)
1970–73	Coburg (VFA)	45 (40)
- ^{1} Playing statistics correct to the end of 1969.

Ivan Manton Marsh (24 May 1943 - 20 Sep 2025) was an Australian rules footballer who played with Footscray in the Victorian Football League (VFL).
