= Doug Prior =

Australian rules footballer

Douglas Ronald Prior

Personal information
- Full name: Doug Prior
- Born: 5 November 1943; Melbourne, Australia
- Original team: Albion
- Height: 183 cm (6 ft 0 in)
- Weight: 81 kg (179 lb)
- Position: Forward

Playing career^{1}
Years	Club	Games (Goals)
1966–67	Footscray	15 (19)
- ^{1} Playing statistics correct to the end of 1967.

Doug Prior (born 5 November 1943) is a former Australian rules footballer who played with Footscray in the Victorian Football League (VFL).
