= Flood levy =

Temporary tax for 2010–2011 Queensland floods

The flood levy was a temporary reconstruction tax that funded the reconstruction of affected parts of Queensland, Australia, following the 2010–2011 Queensland floods. The proposal passed Parliament on 22 March 2011. This levy applied to those with a taxable income of more than $50,000 a year, coming into effect from 1 July 2011. The rate was 0.5% for income above $50000 and 1% for income above $100000. Those who were affected by a declared natural disaster were exempt. Preliminary estimates, following consultation with the Queensland Government, concluded that the Australian Government needed co-investment of $5.6 billion. Two-thirds of that cost was delivered through budget cuts.

== Passing the Parliament ==
The Flood Recovery Levy passed the Parliament on 22 March 2011. The bill passed the Australian House of Representatives with government support by Andrew Wilkie, Bob Katter, Tony Crook, and Adam Bandt. The Liberal/National Coalition Opposition opposed the bill. The bill proceeded to the Senate, with Family First Senator Steve Fielding and independent Nick Xenophon supporting the proposal. Under a deal with Senator Xenophon, the government rewrote the terms of the Natural Disaster Relief and Recovery Arrangements to ensure state and territory governments take out disaster insurance, or establish an equivalent fund.

== Measures for delivering funding ==
The Gillard Government delivered the funding primarily through spending cuts, which raised approximately $2.8 billion. The Government cut green programs such as the Green Car Innovation Fund, and the Cleaner Car Rebate Scheme. A further $1 billion was raised by delaying major infrastructure projects around Australia. The last $1.8 billion was raised by funds received through the flood recovery levy. This levy did not apply to anyone directly affected by the disaster.
