= Terry Benton =

Australian rules footballer

Personal information
- Full name: Terry Benton
- Born: 13 July 1942 (age 84)
- Original team: West Coburg
- Height: 175 cm (5 ft 9 in)
- Weight: 76 kg (168 lb)

Playing career^{1}
Years	Club	Games (Goals)
1963–1969	North Melbourne	77 (3)
- ^{1} Playing statistics correct to the end of 1969.

Terry Benton (born 13 July 1942) is a former Australian rules footballer who played with North Melbourne in the Victorian Football League (VFL).

Benton, a defender, played junior football at West Coburg, prior to joining North Melbourne. He played with North Melbourne for seven seasons and didn't miss a game in both 1966 and 1967.

In the early 1970s he coached Latrobe Valley Football League club Leongatha and won the league's best and fairest award in 1971.

His grandson, Jaryd Cachia, was drafted by Carlton and played 14 games for them.
