= Jaryd Cachia =

Australian rules footballer (born 1991)

Personal information
- Full name: Jaryd Cachia
- Born: 8 May 1991 (age 35)
- Original team: Northern Knights
- Draft: No. 15, 2010 AFL rookie draft No. 9, 2013 AFL rookie draft
- Height: 184 cm (6 ft 0 in)
- Weight: 84 kg (185 lb)
- Position: Midfielder

Playing career^{1}
Years	Club	Games (Goals)
2010–2011; 2013–2014	Carlton	14 (1)
- ^{1} Playing statistics correct to the end of 2013.

Jaryd Cachia (born 8 May 1991) is an Australian rules footballer who played for Carlton in the Australian Football League (AFL).

The grandson of Terry Benton, Cachia played school football for St Kevin's College before joining the Northern Knights. He co-captained the Victorian Metropolitan Under 16s team with Tom Scully in the national competition. He played his first TAC Cup game for the Knights at the age of 16 in 2007, eventually playing 21 games for the Knights over three years.

== AFL career ==
Cachia was drafted by the Carlton Football Club with its first round selection in the 2010 AFL rookie draft (No. 15 overall). He spent two seasons playing in the senior team of Carlton's VFL-affiliate, the Northern Bullants, but did not play an AFL game for Carlton during this time. At the conclusion of the 2011 Australian Football League season, Cachia was delisted by the Carlton Football Club.

After being delisted, Cachia played for Norwood in the South Australian National Football League in 2012; Cachia finished in the top five for the Magarey Medal and was part of Norwood's premiership team. After the season, Carlton re-drafted Cachia to the AFL with its first round selection in the 2013 AFL Rookie Draft (No. 9 overall).

Cachia made his senior AFL debut for Carlton in Round 6, 2013, and played regularly for most of the rest of the season, managing a total of fourteen games. He remained on the Carlton list in 2014, but did not play another senior game and was delisted at the end of the year.

== Post AFL career ==
Since leaving the AFL system, Cachia has played for the Richmond reserves in the VFL (2015), another stint at Norwood (2016), Strathmore (2017–18) and Aberfeldie (2019) in the Essendon District Football League, Golden Square in the Bendigo Football League (where he signed in 2020 but never played because the season was cancelled due to the COVID-19 pandemic), and St Kevin's Old Boys in the VAFA (2021).

== Personal life ==
Cachia was married to influencer Sophie Shaw until 2019, when Shaw ended the marriage to pursue relationships with women. They had two children together, Bobby and Florence.
