= 2010–2011 Queensland floods =

Natural disaster event in Queensland, Australia

Coordinates: 27°35′S 152°12′E

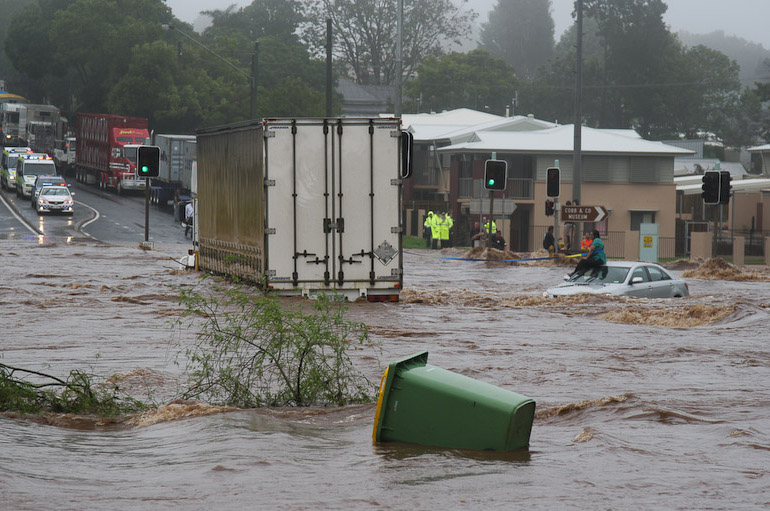
- A woman trapped on the roof of her car awaits rescue during the Toowoomba flash flood.
- Date: December 2010–January 2011 (2 months)
- Location: Much of central and southern Queensland including Brisbane, Rockhampton, Gympie, Emerald, Bundaberg, Dalby, Toowoomba, Roma, and Ipswich
- Cause: Prolonged heavy rainfall associated with a strong La Niña event, Tropical Cyclone Tasha, and an active monsoonal trough
- Deaths: 33 to 37
- Missing: 3 (declared deceased, June 2012)
- Property damage: A$2,389,225,876; 200,000 people affected

The 2010–2011 Queensland floods were a series of major floods that affected much of Queensland, Australia, between December 2010 and January 2011. Prolonged and extensive rainfall fell across large areas of the state on catchments already saturated by a strong La Niña event, following the wettest December on record for Queensland. As of March 2012, 33 deaths had been attributed to the floods, with a further three people missing, later declared deceased by the State Coroner in June 2012. The event ranked among the most destructive disasters in Australian history.

Flooding occurred across much of central and southern Queensland, affecting every major river system south of the Tropic of Capricorn and inundating numerous towns and cities, including Rockhampton, Emerald, Bundaberg, Toowoomba, Ipswich, and Brisbane. More than 200,000 people and 41 local government areas were affected, while over 78 percent of the state was declared a disaster zone, impacting more than 2.5 million people. Approximately 29,000 homes and businesses experienced some degree of inundation. The disaster caused 33 deaths, with a further three people later declared deceased.

The floods caused widespread damage to infrastructure, agriculture, mining, and communities. Insured losses were estimated at A$2.38 billion, while a 2016 assessment estimated the total economic cost at A$14.1 billion, making the disaster one of the costliest in Australian history. The event prompted one of Australia's largest disaster responses, including large-scale evacuations, deployment of the Australian Defence Force, establishment of the Queensland Floods Commission of Inquiry, and the creation of the Queensland Reconstruction Authority. Subsequent litigation over the operation of Wivenhoe Dam resulted in a negligence ruling in 2019 before being overturned on appeal in 2021, with the High Court of Australia refusing a final appeal in 2022.

== Background and meteorological history ==
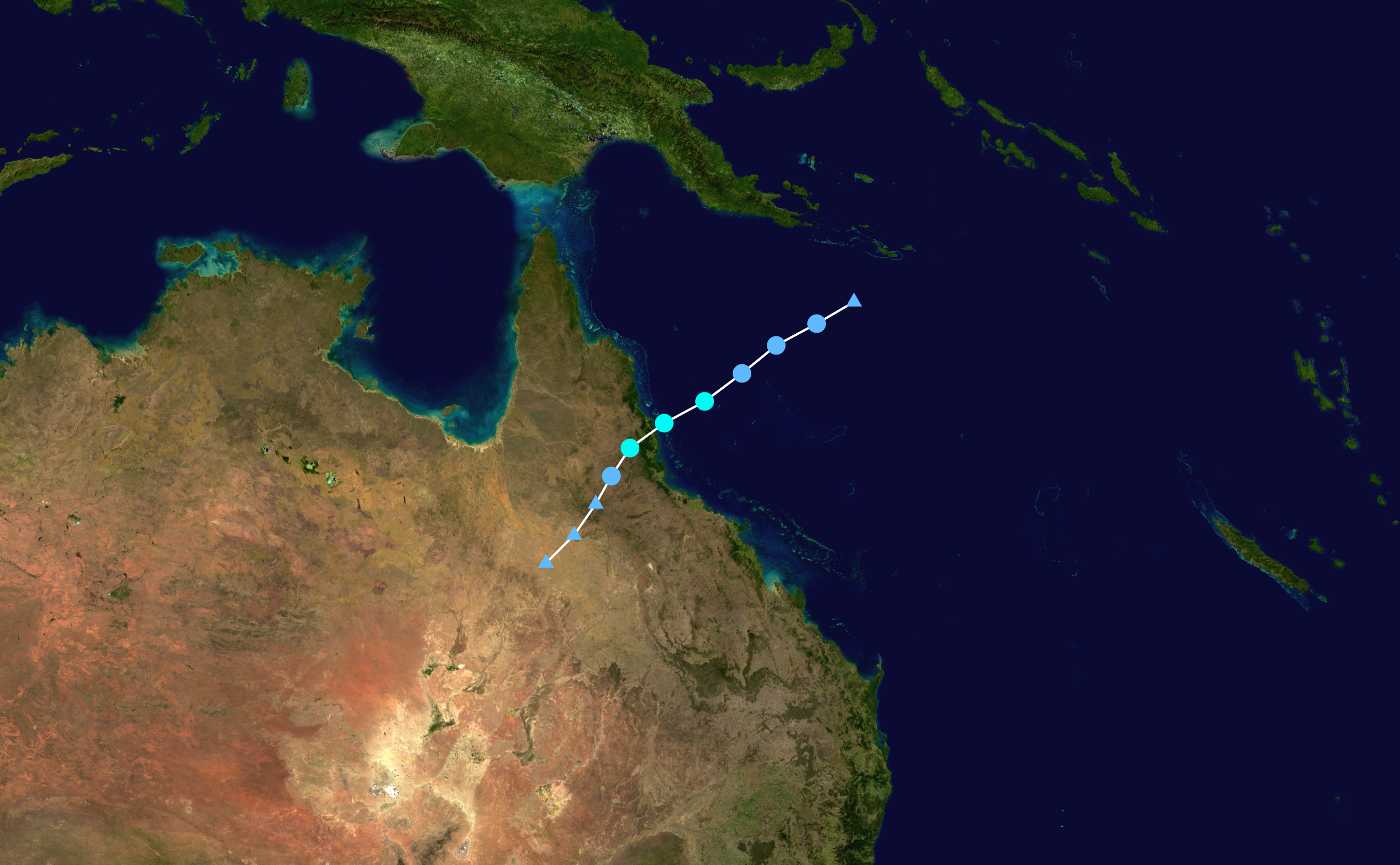
Track of Cyclone Tasha

Brisbane experienced major flooding in 1893 and 1974 as the Brisbane River broke its bank and inundated low-lying areas. Towns, including St. George and Theodore, had dealt with major flooding earlier in 1996. The 2010 La Niña Modoki weather pattern, which brings wetter conditions to eastern Australia, was the strongest since 1973. This La Niña event caused a prolonged event of heavy rainfall over Queensland river catchments. Record or near record sea surface temperatures were recorded off the Queensland coast in late 2010. December 2010 was Queensland's wettest on record, with record-high rainfall totals set in 107 locations for the month. The state's average rainfall level of 209.45 millimetres (8.25 in) exceeded the previous record of 200.1 millimetres (7.88 in) set in 1975. 2010 was also recorded as the state's wettest spring since 1900, and the Australian continent's third-wettest year.

The floods were a result of heavy rainfall caused by Tropical Cyclone Tasha that combined with a trough during the peak of a La Niña Modoki event. Isolated flooding started across parts of the state in early December. On 23 December, a monsoonal trough crossed the coast from the Coral Sea, bringing torrential rain that fell in a broad swath from the Gulf of Carpentaria to the Gold Coast. The Bureau of Meteorology first issued an advisory for a developing tropical low 24 December. The agency declared a cyclone warning for areas between Port Douglas and Lucinda, Queensland. Some parts of Queensland were already suffering from flooding and additional rainfall was expected to worsen the situation. The low intensified into Tropical Cyclone Tasha, which reached its peak intensity on 24 December with winds of 75 km/h (45 mph) and a barometric pressure of 993 mbar (hPa; 29.32 inHg). Hours later, the centre of Tasha made landfall between Cairns and Innisfail at this intensity. Although a relatively weak storm, Tasha produced widespread torrential rains in Queensland, amounting to more than 250 mm (9.8 in) in some areas.

Climate scientist Kevin Trenberth thought climate change was a contributing factor in the unusually high precipitation rates. He attributed a half-degree Celsius rise in ocean temperatures around Australia to global warming (which produces extra water vapour and intensifies the monsoon). Other scientists say that it is too early to draw such a conclusion. Assertions were also made by Professor Hubert Chanson, an expert in dam and reservoir engineering with extensive firsthand knowledge of the Wivenhoe system, that mismanagement of the Wivenhoe Dam might be a contributor to the some flooding in the lower Brisbane valley. While an expert engineer, Michael O'Brien—a senior manager of an ASX-listed resources company and an outside consultant evaluating cause—agrees that "massive releases of water from Wivenhoe Dam on Tuesday, 11 January, did indeed produce most of the flooding in the Brisbane River the following afternoon, with a peak in the early hours of Thursday morning, 13 January. The dam's releases into the Brisbane River also caused the Bremer River, which winds through the city of Ipswich, and the Lockyer Creek to back up and cause much of the flooding outside Brisbane." This was corroborated by a panel of engineers hired by the Insurance Council of Australia. O'Brien also found that the Wivenhoe Dam and Somerset Dam did not hold the maximum capacity they were capable of holding during the crisis period, which would have significantly alleviated flooding. Only one source, Neal Ashkanasy, who specialises in social and organisational psychology (and 35 years ago was involved in the design of Wivenhoe Dam), found fault with these results and instead finds that the dam was operated correctly throughout the time of the storm and the flood that followed, saying the "dam was run with outstanding precision."

== Extent ==
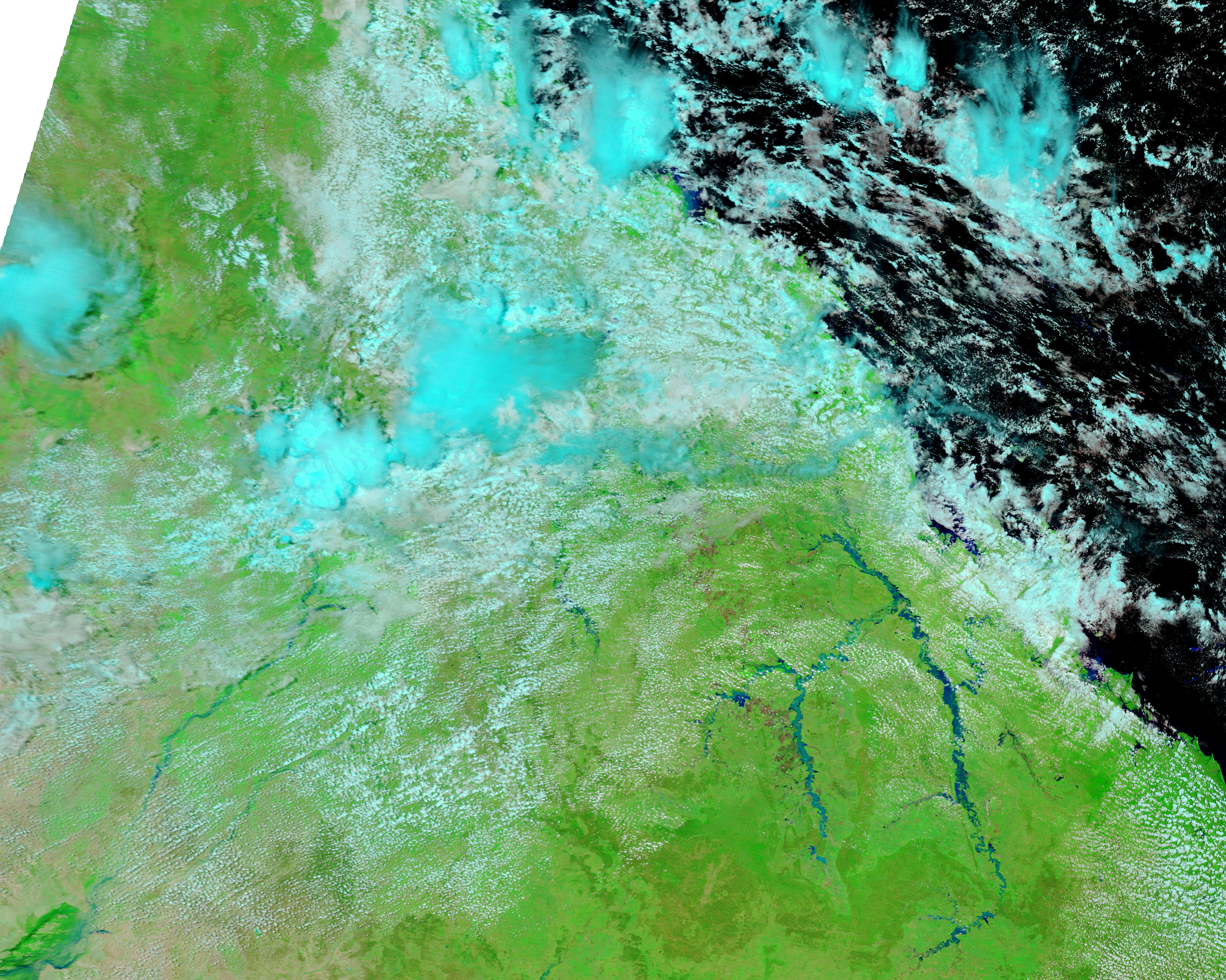
NASA image showing swollen rivers and cloud cover.

By 28 December, nearly half of Queensland was flooded and preliminary damage estimates exceeded A$1.4 billion. Total economic losses also reached A$6 billion, roughly 0.5% of the nation's gross domestic product. In response to the severe flooding, the Government of Queensland declared numerous towns as disaster areas, allowing for federal funds to be used. By 27 December, flood waters began to recede in Babinda and Gordonvale, leaving behind debris and thick black mud. By 30 December vast areas of Southern and Central Queensland were flooded. The conditions led to a large influx of snakes in the Rockhampton area, as well as some crocodiles.

Flooding was widespread across Queensland and New South Wales from the end of December 2010 to January 2011 with several separate rain events causing rivers to rise over a lengthy period. Many places, including Condamine and Chinchilla were inundated by flood waters on multiple occasions. About 300 roads were closed, including nine major highways.

During the flooding it was reported that more than three-quarters of Queensland was affected by flooding.

=== Fitzroy River basin ===
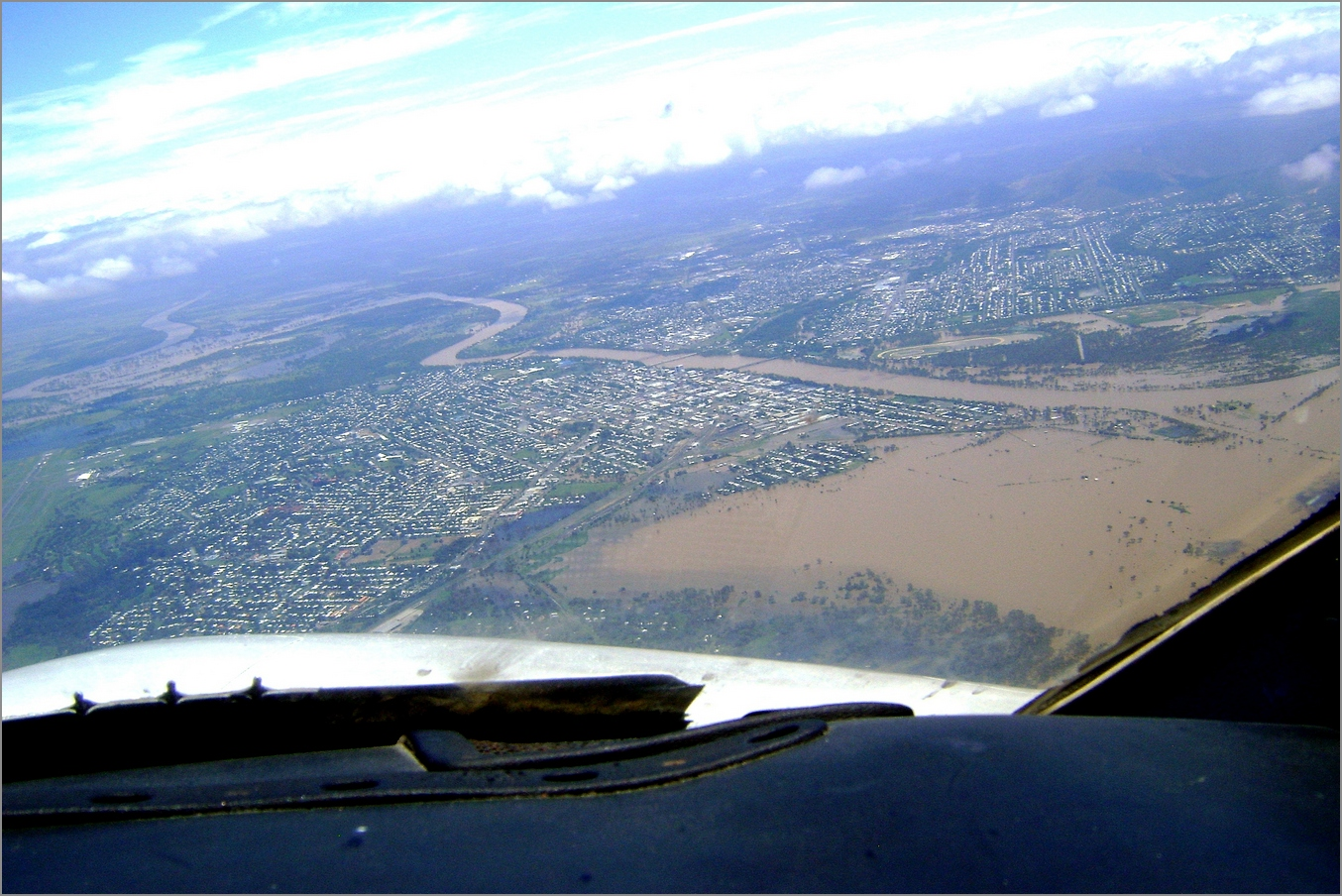
Rockhampton seen from the air on 31 December; the Fitzroy River can be seen to have burst its banks

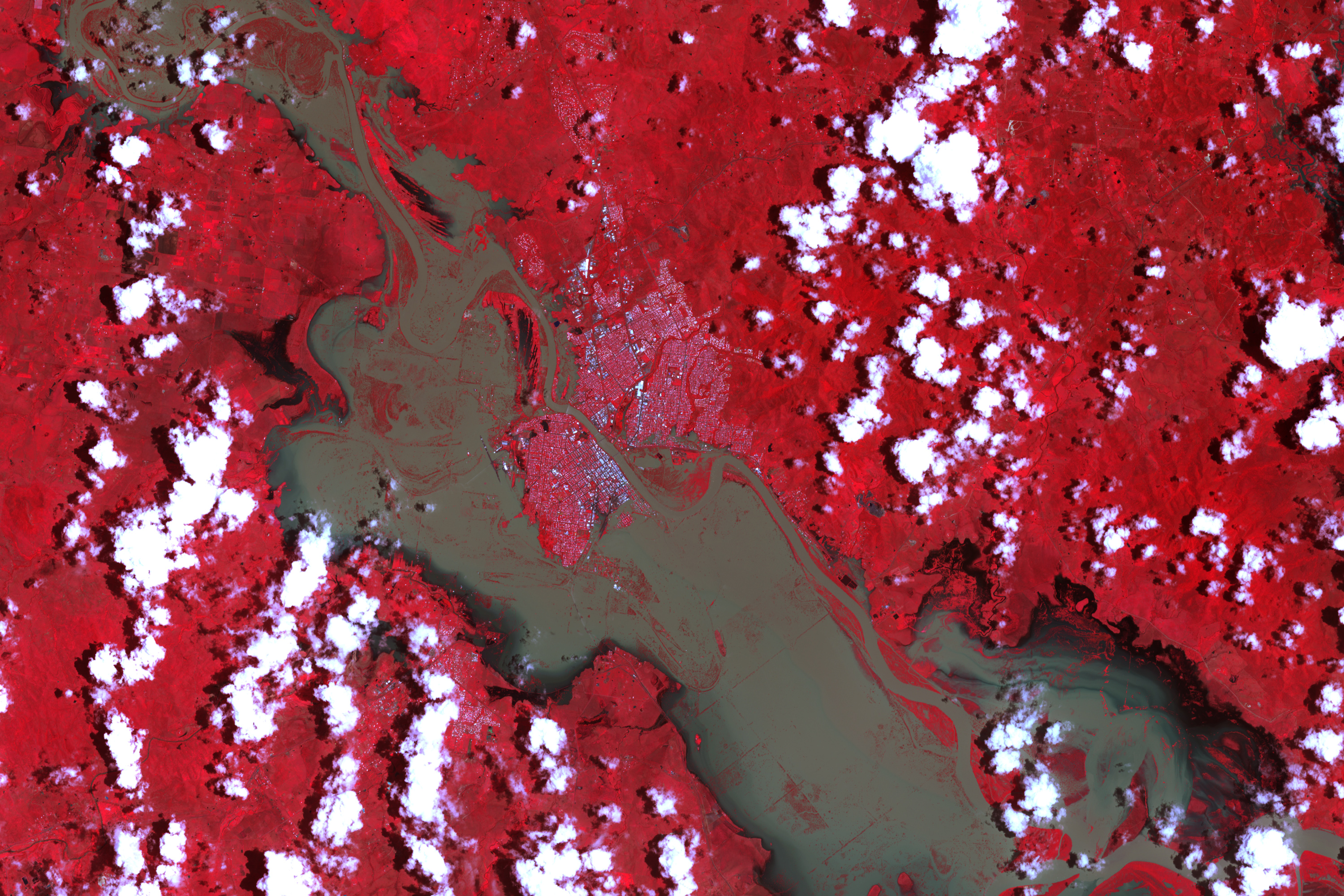
View of the swollen Fitzroy River, which surrounds the western half of Rockhampton

Thousands of hectares of cropland were inundated by floods and many towns and cities were underwater. In Theodore, much of the area was flooded after the Dawson River reached its highest level in 50 years, cresting around 14 m (46 ft). This surpassed the previous record by more than 50 cm (1.6 ft). The flooding forced the evacuation of 1,000 people from Theodore and other towns, some using military helicopters, transporting residents to an evacuation centre at Moura. The evacuation was described as unprecedented by the acting chief officer of the Emergency Management Queensland. The total evacuation of a Queensland town was a first for the state. Major flooding at Theodore persisted for more than two weeks.

Emerald was cut off by road on 29 December as the Nogoa River rose. By the next day, the river surpassed the 2008 flood peak level of 15.36 metres (50.4 ft). At the peak of the flooding, 80% of the town was flooded, the worst the town ever experienced. Twelve hundred Emerald residents registered as evacuees.

Rockhampton had nearly a week to prepare for an expected flood peak from the Fitzroy River, which courses through the centre of the city. The airport was closed on 1 January. A metal flood barrier was erected around the terminal to prevent flood-borne debris from causing damage to the structure. An evacuation centre was set up at the Central Queensland University. The Bruce Highway leading south out of Rockhampton was closed to traffic. The river peaked at 9.2 metres (30 ft), just short of the predicted 9.4-metre (31 ft) maximum.

The Port of Gladstone reduced its export capacity because the coal stockpiles at the port were saturated and further coal deliveries could not be made by rail. The Goonyella railway line which serves a number of coal mines in the Bowen Basin was closed for one week and shipments of grain were also delayed.

=== Burnett River basin ===
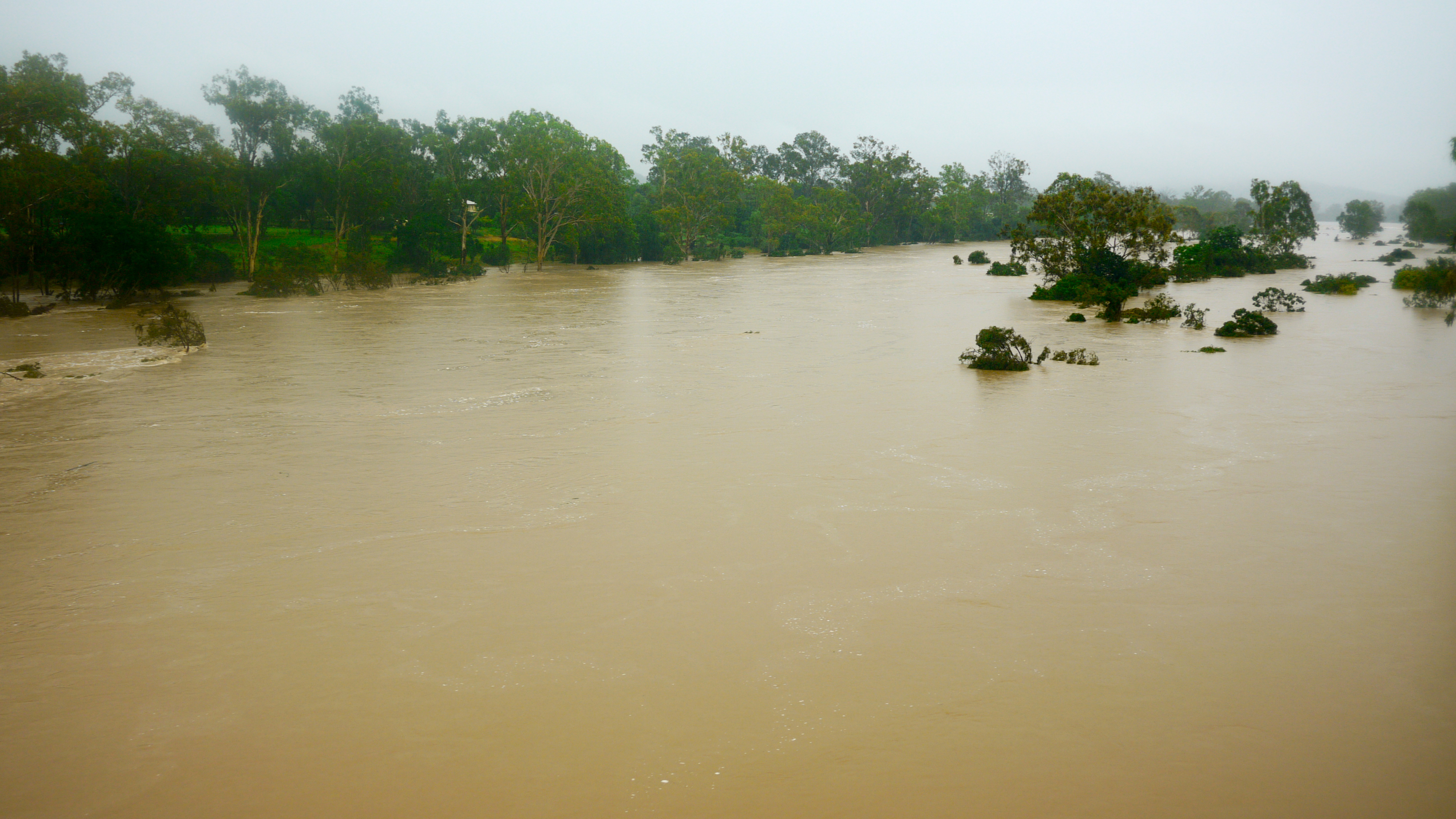
The swollen Burnett River at Gayndah, 350 kilometres (220 mi) north west of Brisbane

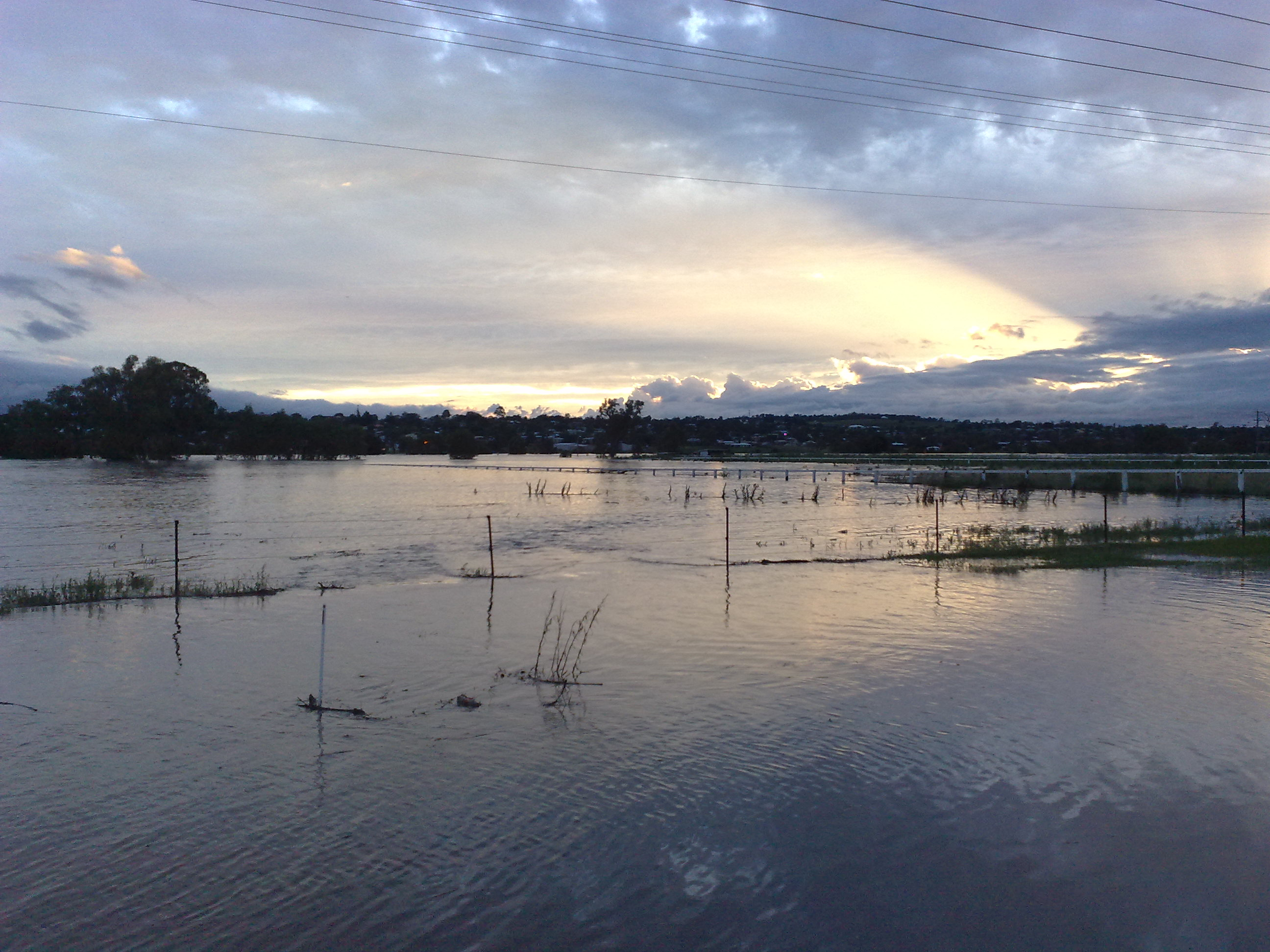
A flooded paddock in Warwick

The central Burnett towns of Gayndah and Mundubbera saw major flooding on 28–29 December. The Burnett River peaked at 18.25 metres (59.9 ft) at Mundubbera—the highest river height since 1942—inundating more than 20 houses. Downstream at Gayndah, the river peaked at 16.1 metres (53 ft) with floodwaters reaching two houses. Both towns were isolated for several days and there was major disruption to the potable water supply and local agricultural production.

Bundaberg experienced severe flooding, the worst in 40 years, after the Burnett River flooded the city, although the Paradise Dam reservoir contributed to some flood mitigation. This resulted in the evacuation of 300 homes. The Bundaberg Port, a major sugar exporting facility, was closed late in December 2010 as flooding deposited silt in the port, forcing its closure. The port re-opened in early March 2011 after successful dredging operations allowed ships to berth.

=== Condamine/Balonne River basin ===
Chinchilla and Jericho were also inundated. At least 40 residents were evacuated from Chinchilla.

Flooding in Dalby was the worst since 1981. The town's water purification system was flooded, resulting in water restrictions that hampered clean-up efforts. 112,500 litres (24,700 imp gal; 29,700 US gal) of water were transported to the town of 14,000 residents. Warwick was isolated when all roads into the town were cut off.

The Condamine River reached 14.25 metres (46.8 ft) on 30 December, its highest level ever recorded. Condamine was mandatorily evacuated on 30 December.

A second rain event on 9–10 January saw floodwaters again threaten Chinchilla and Condamine with Chinchilla residents again asked to evacuate.

The Macintyre River, which forms part of the border between the Australian states of New South Wales and Queensland, began to threaten the town of Goondiwindi on 13 January. While the town is protected by an 11-metre (36 ft) levee, the local hospital and aged care home were evacuated as a precaution and an evacuation centre was established.

=== Mary River basin ===
Heavy rain in the Mary River catchment on 8–9 January 2011 led to flooding at Maryborough and Gympie. The Mary River at Maryborough was expected to initially peak at 8.5 metres (28 ft) at midday 9 January with some houses and businesses inundated by flood waters.

=== Toowoomba and the Lockyer Valley ===
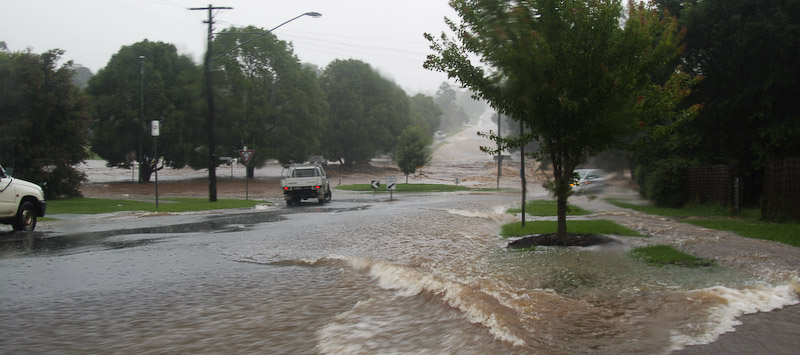
Long and Mackenzie Streets in suburban Toowoomba flooded.

External videos
- Flooding at Helidon on 10 January
- East Creek Toowoomba in flood

The city of Toowoomba, in the Darling Downs, was hit by flash flooding after more than 160 millimetres (6.3 in) of rain fell in 36 hours to 10 January 2011; this event caused four deaths in a matter of hours. Cars were washed away (see video). Toowoomba sits on the watershed of the Great Dividing Range, some 700 metres (2,300 ft) above sea level. A three-week period where it had rained on all but three days had left the soil around Toowoomba super saturated and when a line of storms hit the city on 10 January, the resulting torrential rain rapidly ran off down gullies and streets. The central business district of the city sits in a small valley where two small water courses—East Creek and West Creek—meet to form Gowrie Creek. Unable to cope with the volume of water heading toward them, the creeks burst their banks, pushing a devastating wall of water through the city centre. This water then headed west—not towards the Lockyer Valley which was also experiencing extreme rainfall that fell on eastern facing slopes.

The surge associated with rainfall which fell on the eastern side of the range passed through the Lockyer Valley town of Withcott, where the force of the water pushed cars into shops and forced the evacuation of hundreds of people. The scene was described by an onlooker as "like Cyclone Tracy has gone through it ... If you dropped an atom bomb on it, you couldn't tell the difference." Nearby Helidon had several homes and farms flooded but did not break the main creek bank and enter the town. It was cut off from all sides by destroyed roads. Grantham was also devastated by the surge of water. Houses were left crumpled by what Premier of Queensland Anna Bligh described as an "inland tsunami". According to local media, the flood waters had reached a height of 7 or 8 metres (23 or 26 ft) by the time it struck Grantham. The peak discharge rate around Withcott and Grantham where Lockyer Creek is joined by Gatton Creek, was estimated to be 3,500 m^{3} second. At least 100 people were evacuated to the Helidon Community Hall. Nine people were confirmed dead, and many more feared dead among 66 reported missing. The body of one victim washed away at Grantham was recovered 80 kilometres (50 mi) downstream and Queensland Police Commissioner Bob Atkinson warned that some bodies may never be found. Nearby Gatton saw voluntary evacuations as the Lockyer Creek rose to a record height of 18.92 metres (62.1 ft), exceeding the previous record set in the 1893 Queensland floods.

Three people from Grantham listed as missing were officially declared dead by the Coroner on 5 June 2012.

=== Brisbane River catchment ===
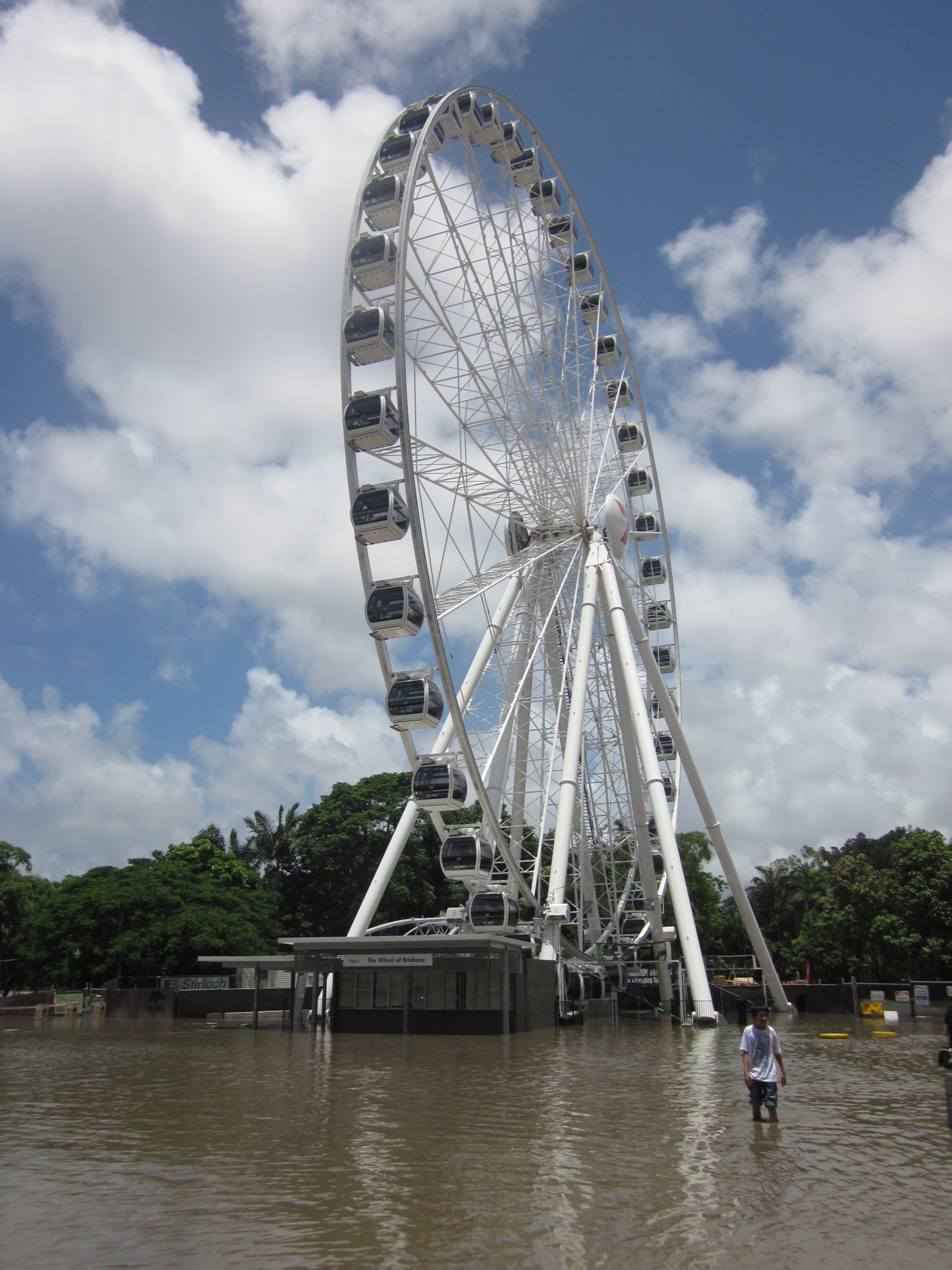
Wheel of Brisbane during the floods.

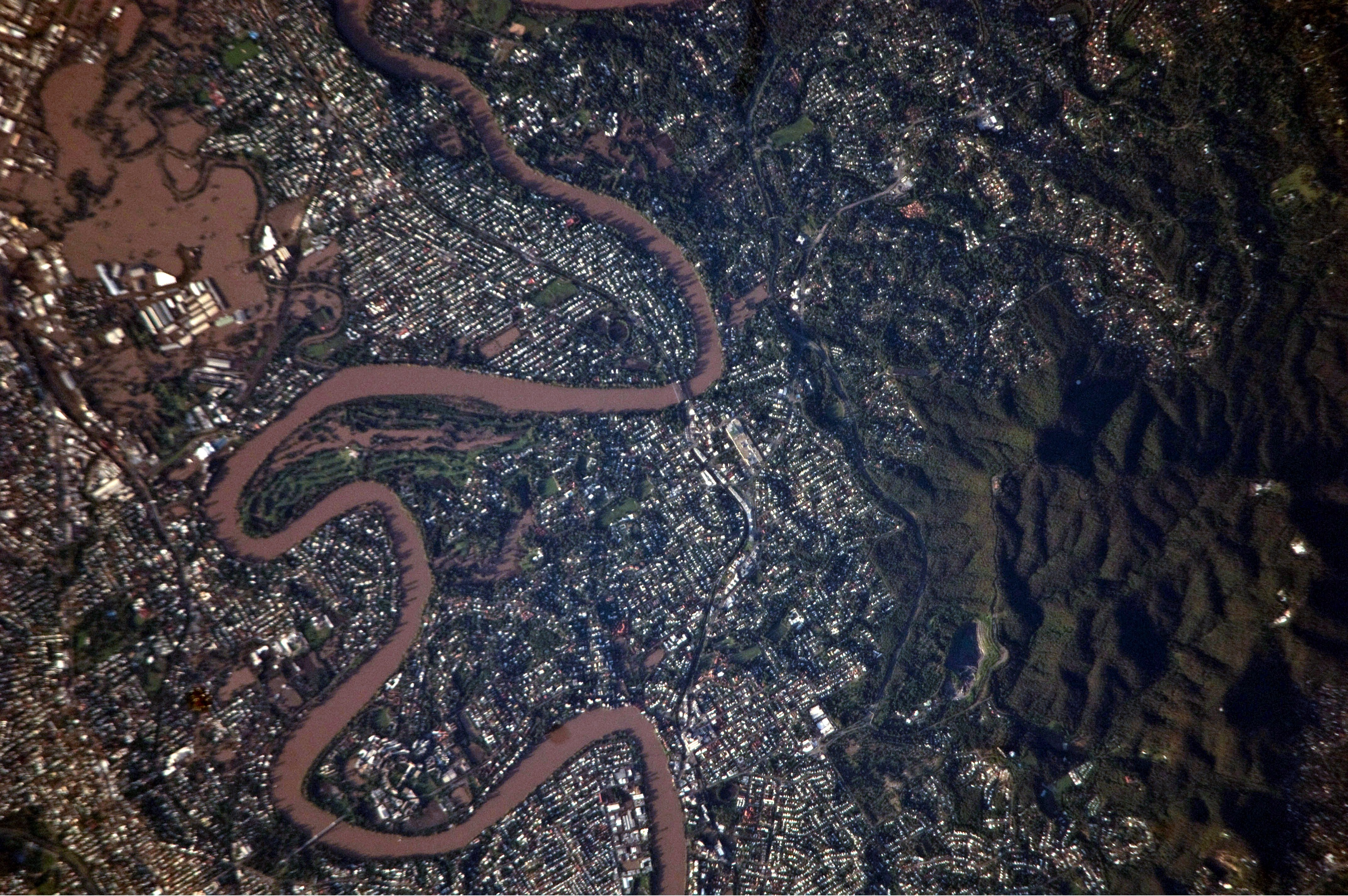
This detailed astronaut photograph illustrates flooding in suburbs of the Brisbane metropolitan region.

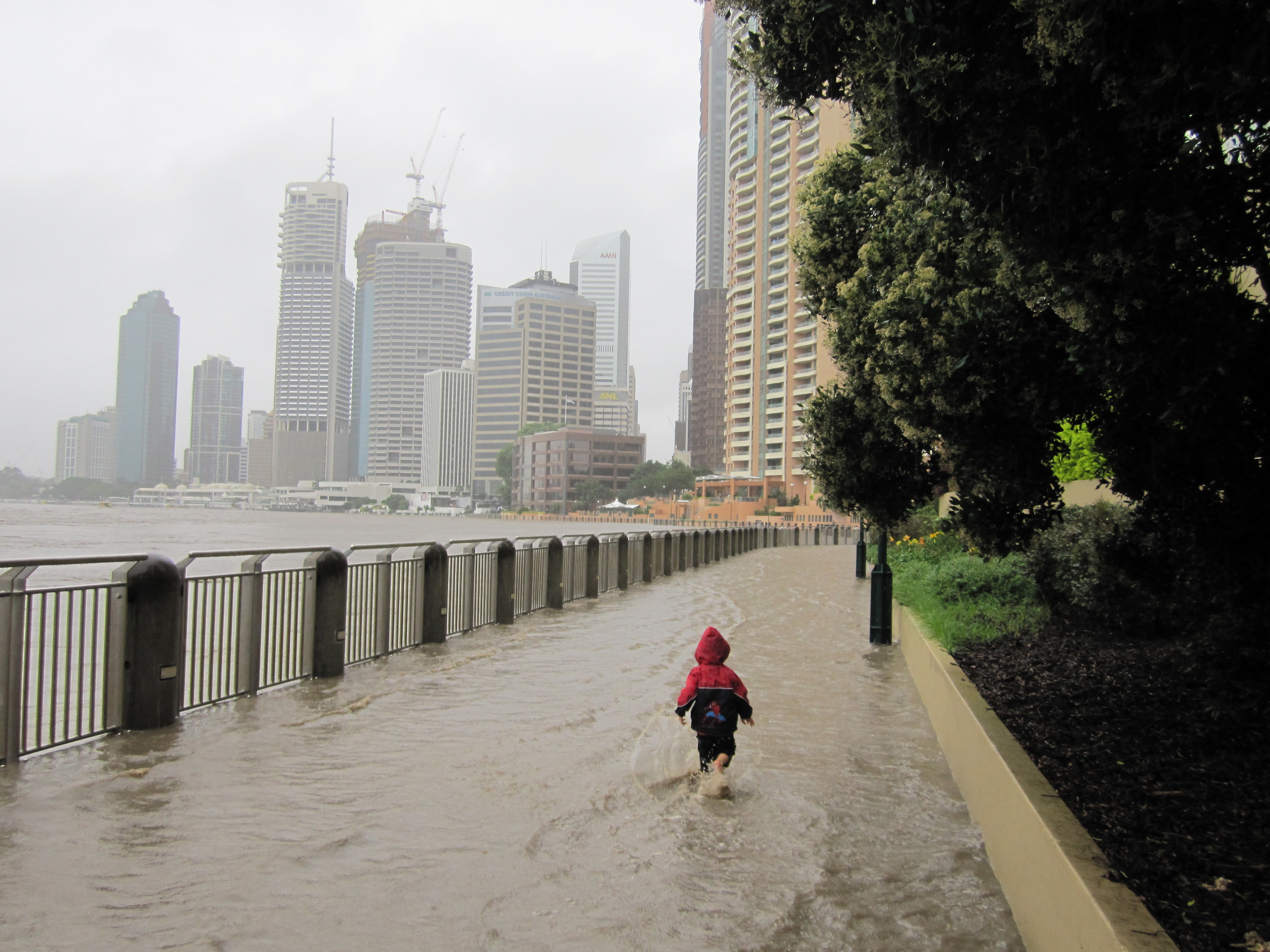
A child plays in the floodwaters as the Brisbane River breaks its banks in the city.

Flooding began to affect low-lying areas of Brisbane on the morning of 11 January 2011. By around 2:30 p.m. AEST, the Brisbane River broke its banks leading to evacuations in the Brisbane CBD and the suburbs of Fortitude Valley and West End. An evacuation centre was established for flood-affected residents at the RNA Showgrounds in Bowen Hills. Residents of 2,100 Brisbane streets were advised to evacuate prior to the arrival of floods, which struck the city on 12 January. Lord Mayor Campbell Newman stated than an estimated 20,000 homes would be affected when the river peaked on 14 January. He subsequently advised that the Brisbane River transport infrastructure had been "substantially destroyed".

The Brisbane River peaked on 13 January at a lower level than predicted, but still 20,000 houses in Brisbane were inundated. Some of the Brisbane suburbs worst affected by the floods were St Lucia, West End, Rocklea and Graceville. The floods damaged some of Brisbane's icons. The Brisbane Riverwalk, a floating walkway over the Brisbane River linking the inner city neighbourhoods of Fortitude Valley and New Farm, broke up, with a section forming a 300-metre (980 ft) "floating missile" that threatened the Sir Leo Hielscher Bridges. The largest part of the floating boardwalk was safely guided under the bridge by a tugboat and past other infrastructure before being safely secured. Brisbane's major Rugby league and Soccer (Association Football) venue, Suncorp Stadium, filled with water up to 2 metres (6.6 ft) deep, reaching the third or fourth row of seats.

With the flood peaking at 4.46 metres (14.6 ft) in Brisbane City, the flood level was about the tenth-highest in the city's history, several metres below the 1890 flood and the two major floods in 1893. Some unique field measurements about the peak of the floods showed very substantial sediment fluxes in the Brisbane River flood plains consistent with the murky appearance of floodwaters. The field deployment showed also some unusual features of flood flow in an urban environment linked with some local topographic effects. Parts of the western suburbs of Brisbane were cut off for three days. Resident of suburbs including Bellbowrie, Karana Downs, Moggill and Pullenvale were running low on food and other items when Moggill Road was cut, until the Australian Army was able to reach the area on 15 January with supplies.

The Bremer River at Ipswich, 30 kilometres (19 mi) west of Brisbane, reached a height of 19.4 metres (64 ft) on 12 January, inundating the central business district and at least 3,000 houses. One third of the city was reported to be underwater and over 1,100 people took shelter at evacuation centres. At Minden, on the border of Ipswich City, a four-year-old boy was swept away by floodwaters when he fell from a rescue boat. A man in his fifties died when he accidentally drove into floodwaters in the Ipswich suburb of Wulkuraka. The worst affected areas of Ipswich were the suburbs of Goodna and Gailes. The flooding led to a rare plausible claim of sharks swimming in a flooded urban area, with reports of bull sharks swimming in two streets in Goodna's center.

Further upstream, Hubners Bridge and Richards Bridge near Kilcoy were washed away. Both bridges have been rebuilt and reopened in 2012.

=== Elsewhere ===
In South East Queensland, the Wivenhoe Dam filled to a level equivalent to 191% of its supply capacity on 11 January 2011. Although the dam can hold the equivalent of 225% of its supply capacity, storage exceeding 100% is required to be progressively released through the floodgates to restore capacity to mitigate future flood events. Brisbane experienced its wettest December since 1859. Wyaralong Dam, near Beaudesert, had recently been completed and was praised for mitigating flooding in downstream Logan, having exceeded 80% of its capacity.

In North Queensland, the town of Ingham was isolated as the Herbert River reached a level of 12.2 m (40 ft). Homes at Babinda and Gordonvale were flooded. The town of Dalby was split in two by the swollen Myall Creek, leaving more than 100 homes flooded.

In New South Wales, 175 people were evacuated to emergency shelters as the flooding spread south. An additional 800 people were isolated in the towns of Urbenville and Bonalbo on 28 December as flood waters blocked off roads.

== Deaths ==
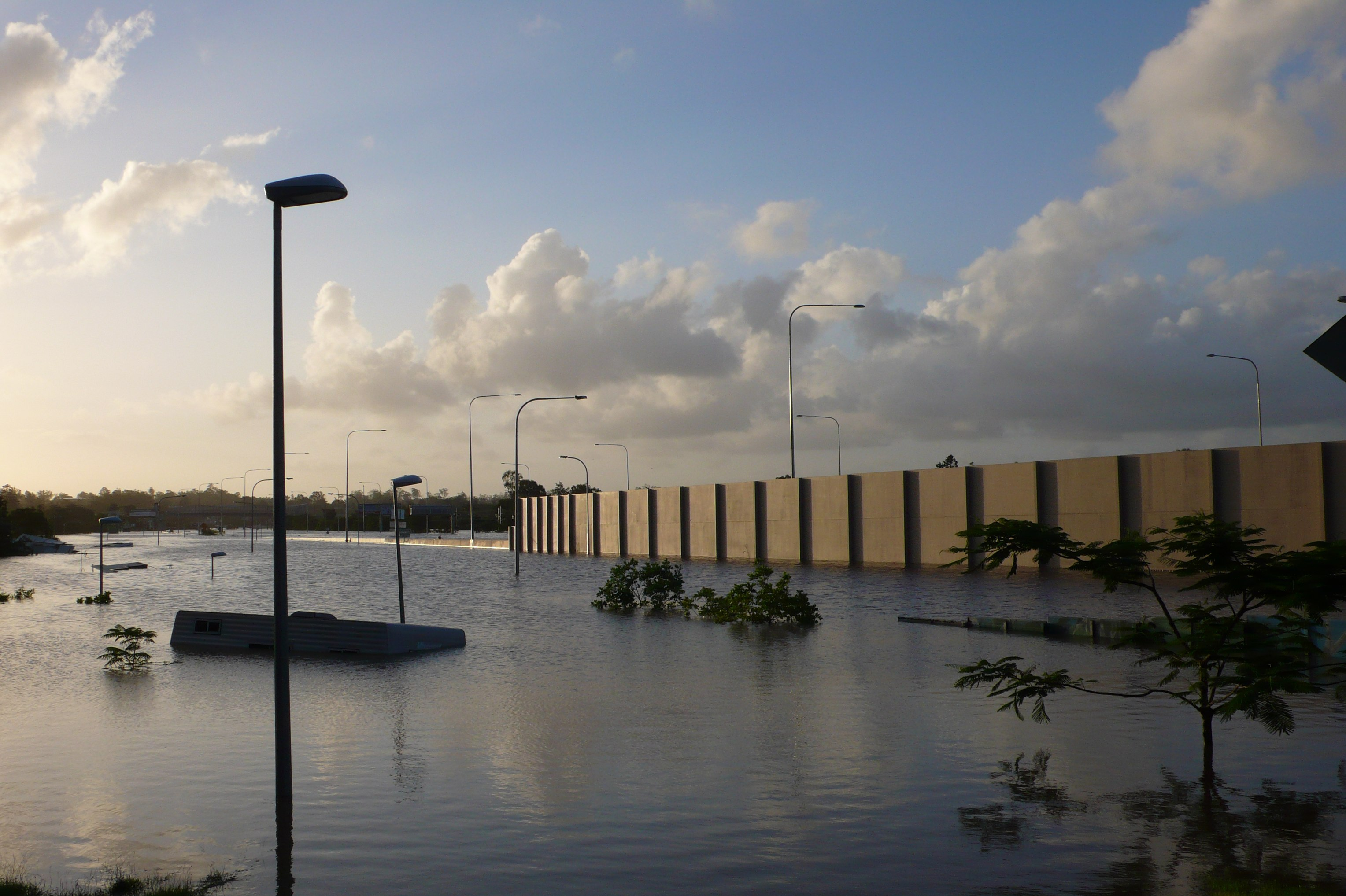
Flooding of a caravan park and motorway at Ipswich suburb of Gailes.

As of March 2012, 33 deaths have been attributed to the floods with 3 people still missing.

The first death occurred on 30 November 2010, when a woman drowned in her vehicle near Dysart. In the following weeks, five others died from similar circumstances. Nine people drowned after being caught directly by the flowing waters and thirteen people died in other circumstances.

One fatality took place in Mareeba, near where Cyclone Tasha made landfall, where a man drowned after being swept off a footbridge.

Thirteen-year-old Jordan Lucas Rice died 10 January 2011 after insisting that his 10-year-old brother, Blake, be saved from the flood waters before him. He drowned along with his mother, 43-year-old Donna Maree Rice, both being residents of Toowoomba. He has been called an Australian hero by the media and in 2015 was post-humously awarded the Australian Bravery Medal for his sacrifice.

== Response ==
=== Public response ===
More than 55,000 volunteers registered to help clean up the streets of Brisbane, with thousands more unregistered volunteers wandering the muddy streets with gumboots and mops. Prime Minister Julia Gillard said the volunteering effort showed tremendous 'Aussie spirit' and that, "... right across Queensland today people have got up, they've marched out of their homes and they've gone to find people to help. It's a tremendous spirit of volunteering right across Queensland ...".

=== Reaction ===
Prime Minister of Australia Julia Gillard toured flood-affected areas on 31 December, the day before the queen (Elizabeth II), sent her expressions of concern and sympathy for the victims of the floods to her representative in Queensland, Governor Penelope Wensley. The queen later made a donation to her Queensland premier's flood relief appeal, as did her son, the Prince of Wales (now Charles III). In March 2011, Charles' eldest son, Prince William, toured the affected areas in Queensland, as well as those damaged by the floods in Victoria.

US secretary of state Hillary Clinton stated, "On behalf of President Obama and the people of the United States, I offer my condolences for the loss of life and damage in Queensland caused by the recent flooding." US president Barack Obama said he was ready to help.

John Key, the prime minister of New Zealand, held a telephone call with Gillard, during which she thanked New Zealand for its help. Len Brown, the mayor of Auckland, a sister city of Brisbane, offered assistance to Brisbane Lord Mayor Campbell Newman.

David Cameron, the prime minister of the United Kingdom offered his sympathies. Downing Street stated: "The Prime Minister offered his deep sympathy on behalf of the British people for those who have died, those who have lost their homes and all those who have been affected by the floods in Queensland."

=== Recovery ===
"As we weep for what we have lost, and as we grieve for family and friends and we confront the challenge that is before us, I want us to remember who we are. We are Queenslanders. We're the people that they breed tough, north of the [New South Wales] border. We're the ones that they knock down, and we get up again. Together we can pull through this and that's what I'm determined to do, with your help, we can achieve it".

— Premier of Queensland Anna Bligh.

Major General Michael Slater was appointed head of a civilian recovery task force. Slater was at the time also the commander of the 1st Division based at the Gallipoli Barracks in Enoggera, Brisbane. The taskforce was later replaced by the Queensland Reconstruction Authority, a new body created to co-ordinate the rebuilding program.

The Australian Defence Force's contribution to flood relief efforts was designated Operation Queensland Flood Assist. The ADF established Joint Task Force 637, based at Enoggera Barracks in Brisbane, for operational command on 1 January 2011. According to the Australian prime minister, the deployment was the largest for a natural disaster since Cyclone Tracy.

About 35 State Emergency Service personnel from New South Wales and 20 personnel from Victoria were deployed to provide relief to exhausted staff and volunteers. A national appeal was established on 29 December, with the state and federal governments giving A$1 million each.

Small businesses and primary producers in 13 local government areas became eligible for grants of up to A$25,000 to pay for costs from damage incurred as a result of the floods. National Disaster Relief and Recovery Arrangements were made available to a total of 31 local government areas across Queensland.

New Zealand announced that the country would send two fifteen-member civil defence teams to assist in flood rescue efforts. New Zealand also offered x3 RNZAF Bell UH-1H helicopters and a C-130 Hercules aircraft, to assist with relief efforts, and air transport, however this offer was declined by the Australian government. In addition to this, New Zealand sent a number of New Zealand Defence Force soldiers, mainly engineers, as well as New Zealand Police and New Zealand Fire Service firefighters. A New Zealand Red Cross team was also dispatched.

=== Aid efforts ===
On 9 January, the Flood Relief Appeal: Australia Unites telethon broadcast by the Nine Network from the Suncorp Piazza at South Bank Parklands, Brisbane raised more than A$10 million in pledged aid. The South Bank area, which includes the Wheel of Brisbane, was itself inundated by flood waters only two days later.

At the first Twenty20 cricket match between Australia and England in Adelaide on 12 January, both teams donated part of their match fees to help the victims and A$28,450 was collected from people in attendance.

On 16 January, the day before the 2011 Australian Tennis Open commenced, a number of players took part in the Rally for Relief which was held at Rod Laver Arena and attended by 15,000 people, which raised A$750,000. The Seven Network televised the event. Players who took part included Roger Federer, Rafael Nadal, Lleyton Hewitt, Novak Djokovic and Andy Roddick.

On 27 January, the 2011 Legends of Origin charity match was contested between former New South Wales and Queensland Rugby League State of Origin players. Organised by Mark Geyer, the match raised $380,587 to go towards the recovery effort.

On 13 January, Queensland Writers Centre, in partnership with Brisbane author Rebecca Sparrow, launched Writers on Rafts to raise funds for flood-affected writing communities. Authors, bloggers, publishers, organisations, festivals, and industry professionals across Australia donated their books, professional skills, and expertise, to drive and promote a fundraiser, and local celebrities donated their time to attend the Ultimate Girly High Tea. Over the course of four months, they raised over $31,000. All funds raised went to the Queensland Premier's Disaster Relief Appeal.

=== Criticism ===
On 11 January 2011, former deputy director of the New South Wales State Emergency Service Chas Keys stated that he was "appalled by the situation in Queensland at the moment. The large number of new houses that have been flooded proves that land management by the Queensland government is extremely poor and building is still going on in inappropriate areas." He contrasted the approach in Queensland with the practices developed in NSW after the 1955 Hunter Valley floods, that aimed to move homes out of dangerous areas and establish warning systems. Keys also stated the NSW practices were being undone by reduced funding and unsafe housing developments, giving the example of Maitland where "the council now wants to build hundreds of dwellings on the flood plain in and round the CBD". Keys also expressed concern over deforestation, stating that, "What we need is re-forestation."

The introduction of the Local Government (Planning and Environment) Act 1990 largely upheld conventional planning and development. A flood plan policy was not introduced until the 21st century. One example is Ipswich, which had concentrated on rebuilding after the 1974 flood. Flood modeling was adopted under the assumption that Wivenhoe Dam would prevent another inundation of this magnitude.

=== Inquiry ===
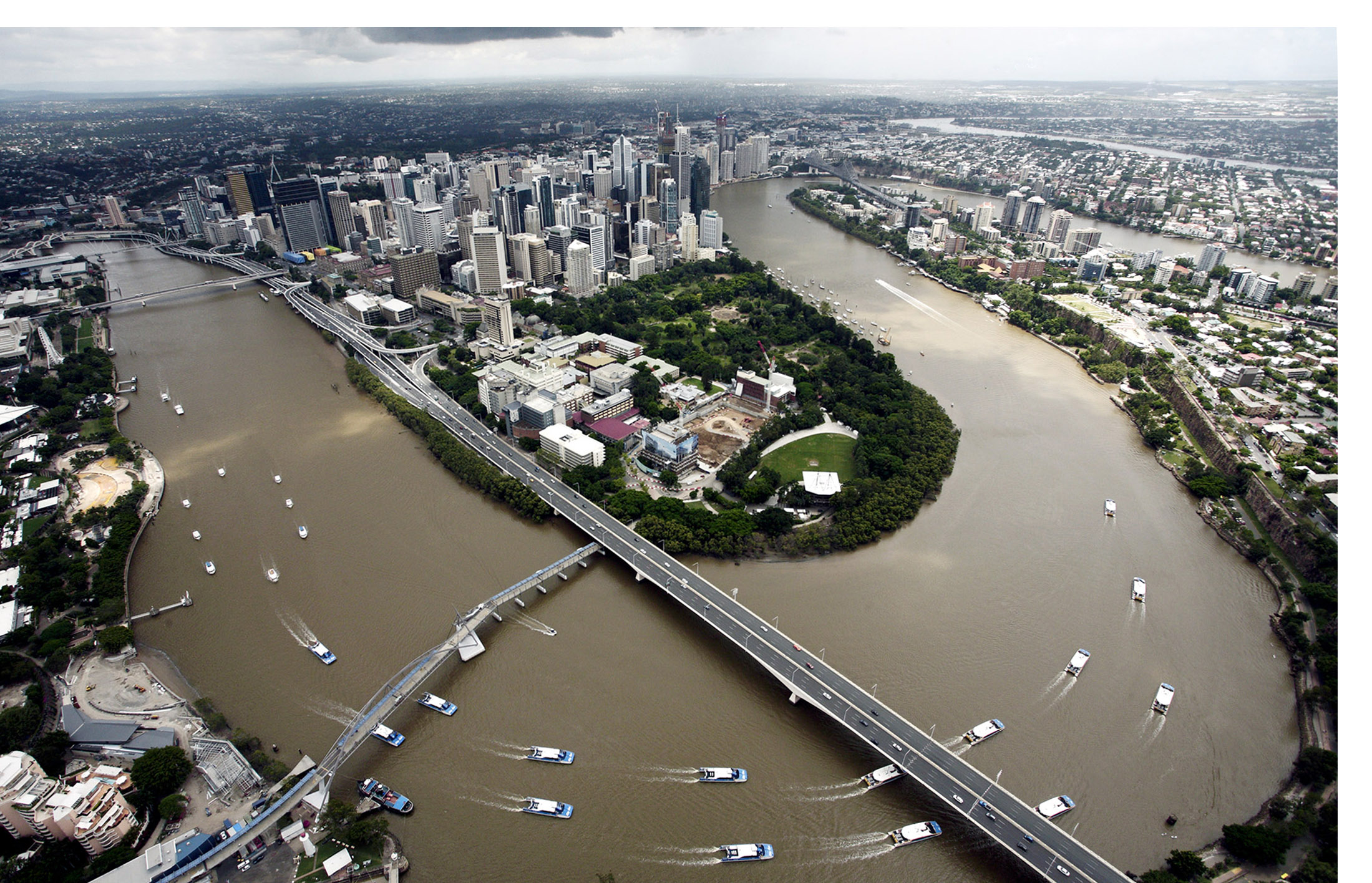
Ferries return to the Brisbane River on 14 February 2011.

On 17 January 2011, Queensland premier Anna Bligh announced a Commission of Inquiry into the 2010–2011 Queensland floods. The commission's Terms of reference cover a wide array of related aspects and stipulate a final report would be due in one year. On 1 August 2011 the Commission handed an interim report to Ms Bligh, and the final report containing 177 recommendations on 16 February 2012.

=== Mandatory disaster insurance ===
In return for Senator Nick Xenophon's support of the Queensland Flood Levy, the Government will modify the Natural Disaster Relief and Recovery Arrangements and force the states to take up disaster insurance.

=== Legal action ===
On 8 July 2014 legal firm Maurice Blackburn lodged a class action with the NSW Supreme Court on behalf of 4,000 flood victims. The legal action alleges negligence and nuisance against the operators of the dams: Seqwater, SunWater and the State of Queensland.

On 29 November 2019, the NSW Supreme Court ruled that the 6,800 class members who ultimately joined the action against the above defendants were victims of negligence. An order as to costs was expected to be made in February 2020.

On 26 February 2021, the result of the legal action was a settlement of A$440 million in compensation, sourced from the Queensland government, SunWater and the state-owned dam operator Seqwater. Seqwater won an appeal against the judgement in September 2021.

== Impacts ==
The severe rainfall across Queensland resulted in a drop in world sea level by as much as 7 mm. The drop lasted for around 18 months and has been attributed to Australia's arheic and endorheic basins which soaked up the water previously evaporated from the oceans.

=== Economic ===
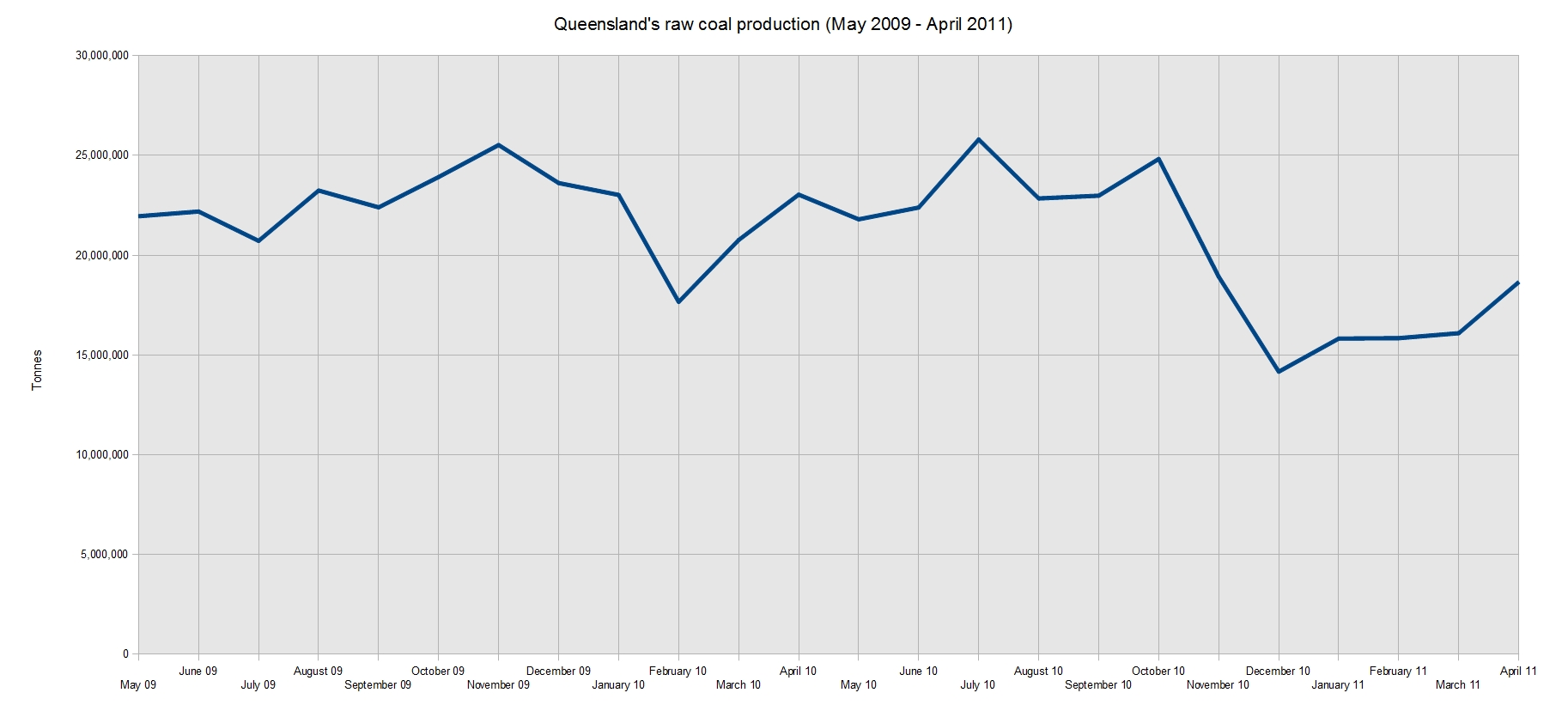
Queensland's raw coal production declined by more one third in late 2010 and was slow to recover

Queensland Treasurer Andrew Fraser said it was not possible to put a figure on the damage; "other than to say the damage bill is going to start with a b and not an m". The floods will cost the Australian economy at least A$10 billion. In figures released at the end of January 2011, the Insurance Council of Australia calculated that 38,460 individual claims were lodged with insurers which were worth A$1.51 billion. Nearly half of those claims were for damage to homes and more than half were made by those living in Brisbane.

The price of food across Australia will go up. The floods will cost supermarket chains tens of millions of dollars. Some communities isolated by floodwaters experienced food shortages, and a rise in the cost of fruits and vegetables was reported shortly after. Food supplies to northern Queensland were disrupted requiring groceries to be transported to Townsville by ship.

Coal railway lines were closed and numerous mine sites flooded. According to an analyst at Macquarie Group almost all the available stockpiles of coking coal in Queensland were exhausted in late January 2011 due to reduced rail capacity. About 15% of the state's annual output of coal production was lost and by late March 2011 recovery was progressing slowly. Four months after the floods the Dalrymple Bay coal terminal was operating at half its capacity as the open-cut mines in the region continued to deal with de-watering issues.

Swimming pool salt was in short supply as salt mines near Rockhampton were flooded. Thousands of litres of milk had to be dumped because it could not be transported for processing. The persistent wet conditions also caused health problems for livestock. There was severe damage to roadways in forestry plantations across wide areas of the south of the state.

Prime Minister Julia Gillard announced that the government would impose a flood levy of between $1 and $5 a week on each household, with proceeds to fund reconstruction works. This was opposed by the Liberal-National Parties which argued that the works should be funded by budget cutbacks. The Levy was approved by the Parliament in March 2011.

== See also ==
- 1893 Brisbane flood
- 1974 Brisbane flood
- Floods in Australia
- List of disasters in Australia by death toll
- March 2010 Queensland floods
- 2013 Queensland floods
- 2010–2011 Queensland Flood and Cyclone Citation
