= Commission of Inquiry into the 2010–2011 Queensland floods =

Investigation Commission of Australia

The Commission of Inquiry into the Queensland floods was an Australian inquiry set up by Queensland Premier Anna Bligh to investigate the circumstances surrounding the deadly 2010–2011 Queensland floods. The independent Inquiry was headed by Justice Cate Holmes and was expected to cost A$15 million. Holmes examined the disaster, government preparedness and the emergency response.

The Inquiry was able to summon witnesses, demand documents and issue search warrants. A total of 345 witnesses were called.

The final report was initially due on the 17 January 2012. This was extended into February due to the quantity of material which has to be processed and analysed. The deadline for submissions was extended to 15 June to allow for submissions related to insurance companies to be included.

The Commission asked independent hydrological expert Mark Babister to investigate the operation of Wivenhoe Dam during the flood period. He found the operators had achieved nearly the best possible flood mitigation effort. The report states that 59% of the downstream flooding was caused by water releases from the dam.

== Interim report ==
An interim report was handed down on 1 August 2011. This report focused on flood preparedness issues so that any appropriate steps may be taken before the next wet season. The 250-page document contained more than 150 recommendations.

Justice Holmes described the Wivenhoe Dam's operating manual as "a bit of a mess" and that the dam should be temporarily reduced to 75% capacity if an extremely wet season is forecast.

== Weekend hearings ==
On 5 and 6 February 2012 the Commission conducted a weekend sitting to hear new evidence related to Wivenhoe Dam operators. Senior flood engineers who were managing the dam during the floods were accused of disregarding the dam's operation manual and of misleading the inquiry.

On the 6 February, it was announced by Holmes that deputy commissioner Philip Cummins would not attend future hearings involving Seqwater or take his advice on the topic. So as to avoid the perception of a conflict of interest the decision was made after it was made public that Cummins would, when the inquiry was complete, take work with a consultant who had separately been engaged by Seqwater.

== Final report ==
The final report was handed to Premier Anna Bligh on the 16 February 2012. The 650-page document contained 177 recommendations. Although the Commission's own expert was quoted in the report as finding that the Flood Engineers in charge of Wivenhoe Dam during the flood had achieved "close to the best possible flood mitigation result", the Commission found that the dam engineers had not complied with the operation manual of Wivenhoe Dam in the lead up to the Brisbane River flood. However, the State of Queensland and six other experts who appeared before the Commission had previously disagreed with this finding and gave evidence during the Commission hearings to that effect. Holmes also found that the manual for dam operations used by the engineers was ambiguous, unclear, impractical and not up to date.

The report also called for the Crime and Misconduct Commission to investigate three flood engineers, John Tibaldi, Rob Ayre and Terry Malone, who were in control of the dam at the time of the flood, regarding their preparation of documents after the event. The Commission considered that their recollection may have been a misleading reconstruction of events rather than a true record of their actions. However the Commission was incorrect in this regard as it was later found by the CMC (following a six-month investigation) that there was no professional misconduct and the three engineers were cleared of any wrongdoing. The report also recommended that a flood study of the Brisbane River catchment be conducted which includes a wide range of data and should form the basis of a hydrological model so that planners can explore various scenarios. All Queensland urban areas should have an updated flood study for use in floodplain management.

== See also ==
- 2009 Victorian Bushfires Royal Commission
