= Ron Birch =

Australian rules footballer

Personal information
- Full name: Ronald James Birch
- Born: 16 October 1943
- Died: 4 July 2009 (aged 65)
- Original team: Wagga Wagga
- Height: 170 cm (5 ft 7 in)
- Weight: 70 kg (154 lb)

Playing career^{1}
Years	Club	Games (Goals)
1963	Footscray	1 (0)
- ^{1} Playing statistics correct to the end of 1963.

Ronald James Birch (16 October 1943 – 4 July 2009) was an Australian rules footballer who played with Footscray in the Victorian Football League (VFL).
