= Ron Cotton =

Australian rules footballer

Personal information
- Full name: Ron Cotton
- Born: 24 December 1942 (age 83)
- Original team: Mulgrave (CFGFL)
- Height: 179 cm (5 ft 10 in)
- Weight: 78 kg (172 lb)

Playing career^{1}
Years	Club	Games (Goals)
1963	South Melbourne	4 (0)
- ^{1} Playing statistics correct to the end of 1963.

Ron Cotton (born 24 December 1942) is a former Australian rules footballer who played with South Melbourne in the Victorian Football League (VFL).
