= Lyle Anderson =

Australian rules footballer

Personal information
- Full name: Lyle Anderson
- Born: 13 October 1936
- Original team: Braybrook
- Height: 178 cm (5 ft 10 in)
- Weight: 80 kg (176 lb)

Playing career^{1}
Years	Club	Games (Goals)
1957–59	Footscray	24 (5)
- ^{1} Playing statistics correct to the end of 1959.

Lyle Anderson (born 13 October 1936) is a former Australian rules footballer who played with Footscray in the Victorian Football League (VFL).
