= Paul Harrison (Australian footballer) =

Australian rules footballer

Personal information
- Full name: Paul Harrison
- Born: 26 July 1944
- Died: 17 March 2005 (aged 60)
- Original team: Traralgon
- Height: 187 cm (6 ft 2 in)
- Weight: 82.5 kg (182 lb)
- Position: Defence

Playing career^{1}
Years	Club	Games (Goals)
1963–70	South Melbourne	119 (27)
- ^{1} Playing statistics correct to the end of 1970.

Paul Harrison (26 July 1944 – 17 March 2005) was an Australian rules footballer who played with South Melbourne in the Victorian Football League (VFL).
