= Reg Egan =

Australian rules footballer

Personal information
- Full name: Reginald Clarence De Burgh Egan
- Born: 24 April 1927
- Died: 14 April 2014 (aged 86)
- Original team: Port Melbourne
- Height: 168 cm (5 ft 6 in)
- Weight: 72 kg (159 lb)

Playing career^{1}
Years	Club	Games (Goals)
1950–53	Footscray	30 (33)
- ^{1} Playing statistics correct to the end of 1953.

Reginald Clarence De Burgh Egan (24 April 1927 – 14 April 2014) was an Australian rules footballer who played with Footscray in the Victorian Football League (VFL).
