= Mick Kelly (Australian footballer) =

Australian rules footballer

Personal information
- Full name: Mick Kelly
- Born: 16 November 1952 (age 73)
- Original team: Williamstown
- Height: 173 cm (5 ft 8 in)
- Weight: 72 kg (159 lb)

Playing career^{1}
Years	Club	Games (Goals)
1976–80	Footscray	57 (18)
- ^{1} Playing statistics correct to the end of 1980.

Mick Kelly (born 16 November 1952) is a former Australian rules footballer who played with Footscray in the Victorian Football League (VFL).
