= Bill Ross (footballer) =

Australian rules footballer

Personal information
- Full name: Bill Ross
- Born: 30 March 1944
- Died: 1 February 2020 (aged 75)
- Height: 178 cm (5 ft 10 in)
- Weight: 80 kg (176 lb)

Playing career^{1}
| Years | Club | Games (Goals) |
| 1963–64 | South Melbourne | 20 (4) |
- ^{1} Playing statistics correct to the end of 1964.

Bill Ross (30 March 1944 – 1 February 2020) was an Australian rules footballer who played with South Melbourne in the Victorian Football League (VFL).
