= Bob Spurling =

Australian rules footballer

Personal information
- Full name: Bob Spurling
- Born: 10 June 1943
- Height: 184 cm (6 ft 0 in)
- Weight: 81 kg (179 lb)

Playing career^{1}
Years	Club	Games (Goals)
1963, 1965	Footscray	6 (2)
- ^{1} Playing statistics correct to the end of 1965.

Bob Spurling (born 10 June 1943) is a former Australian rules footballer who played with Footscray in the Victorian Football League (VFL).
