= Trevor Best =

Australian rules footballer

Personal information
- Full name: Trevor Best
- Born: 2 April 1942 (age 84)
- Original team: North Hobart
- Height: 175 cm (5 ft 9 in)
- Weight: 74.5 kg (164 lb)

Playing career^{1}
Years	Club	Games (Goals)
1963–64	Carlton	21 (10)
- ^{1} Playing statistics correct to the end of 1964.

Trevor Best (born 2 April 1942) is a former Australian rules footballer who played with Carlton in the Victorian Football League (VFL).
