= Bennie Le Sueur =

Australian rules footballer, born 1917

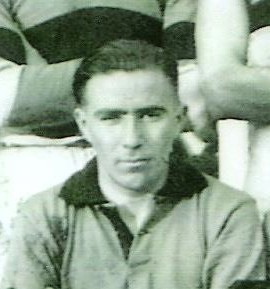
- Le Sueur during his Footscray career

Personal information
- Full name: Benjamin Joseph Le Sueur
- Born: 22 March 1917; Sunshine, Victoria
- Died: 17 August 1994 (aged 77); Geelong, Victoria
- Original team: Braybrook / Sunshine
- Height: 175 cm (5 ft 9 in)
- Weight: 68 kg (150 lb)

Playing career^{1}
Years	Club	Games (Goals)
1937, 1939	Footscray	18 (1)
1940	Collingwood	3 (0)
Total		21 (1)
- ^{1} Playing statistics correct to the end of 1940.

Benjamin Joseph (Bennie) Le Sueur (22 March 1917 – 17 August 1994) was an Australian rules footballer who played for the Footscray Football Club and Collingwood Football Club in the Victorian Football League (VFL).
