= Col Bendelle =

Australian rules footballer

Personal information
- Full name: Colin Edward Bendelle
- Born: 13 July 1944
- Died: 27 August 2007 (aged 63)
- Original team: Parkside
- Height: 173 cm (5 ft 8 in)
- Weight: 76 kg (168 lb)

Playing career^{1}
Years	Club	Games (Goals)
1963	Footscray	3 (0)
- ^{1} Playing statistics correct to the end of 1963.

Colin Edward Bendelle (13 July 1944 – 27 August 2007) was a former Australian rules footballer who played with Footscray in the Victorian Football League (VFL).
