= George Bisset (footballer) =

Australian rules footballer

Personal information
- Born: 17 March 1943 (age 83)
- Original team: Braybrook (FDFL)
- Height: 168 cm (5 ft 6 in)
- Weight: 70 kg (154 lb)

Playing career^{1}
Years	Club	Games (Goals)
1963–1972	Footscray (VFL)	166 (288)
1973–1974	Collingwood (VFL)	41 (49)
1977	Yarraville (VFA)	17 (54)
Total		224 (391)
- ^{1} Playing statistics correct to the end of 1977.

Career highlights
- Charles Sutton Medal: 1969; 5× Footscray leading goalkicker: 1963, 1964, 1967, 1969, 1970

George Bisset (born 10 March 1943) is a former Australian rules footballer. He played as a rover and spent most of his career at Footscray. He was often referred to as "Wee Georgie" Bisset because of his diminutive size.

== Footscray career ==
=== 1969 Brownlow Medal ===
In 1969, Bisset came second to Fitzroy's Kevin Murray by one vote.

Bisset had been reported for striking Carlton's Ian Robertson during the 12 July 1969 match against Carlton; and, although evidence was given that Bisset had punched Robertson (who had also been reported for striking Bisset) at least six times, the charge against Bisset was not sustained.

As a result of being reported, Bisset was not eligible to receive Brownlow votes (for the best player amongst the fairest) for that match; and, given that he had more than 30 "disposals" and had kicked 6 goals, it was very likely that he would have received, at least, one vote.

=== Team of the Century ===
He is a forward pocket in Footscray's official Team of the Century.

== Collingwood career ==
Moving to Collingwood in 1973 under the short-lived VFL's "10-year rule", which allowed players with ten years' service at one club to move to another club without a clearance, Bisset played 41 games in two seasons (1973 and 1974) and kicked 49 goals.
