= Bob Gray (Australian footballer) =

Australian rules footballer

Personal information
- Full name: Robert Everest Gray
- Born: 4 March 1943
- Died: 6 September 2008 (aged 65)
- Height: 188 cm (6 ft 2 in)
- Weight: 83 kg (183 lb)

Playing career^{1}
Years	Club	Games (Goals)
1963–66	Footscray	23 (20)
- ^{1} Playing statistics correct to the end of 1966.

Robert Everest Gray (4 March 1943 – 6 September 2008) was an Australian rules footballer who played with Footscray in the Victorian Football League (VFL).
