= Eric White (footballer) =

Australian rules footballer (1942–2018)

Personal information
- Full name: Eric White
- Born: 10 September 1942
- Died: 14 January 2018 (aged 75)
- Original team: Seaford
- Height: 193 cm (6 ft 4 in)
- Weight: 86 kg (190 lb)

Playing career^{1}
Years	Club	Games (Goals)
1963–65	South Melbourne	21 (7)
- ^{1} Playing statistics correct to the end of 1965.

Eric White (10 September 1942 – 14 January 2018) was an Australian rules footballer who played with South Melbourne in the Victorian Football League (VFL).
