= Daryl Collins =

Australian rules footballer (born 1956)

Personal information
- Full name: Daryl Collins
- Born: 15 July 1956 (age 70)
- Original team: Braybrook
- Height: 180 cm (5 ft 11 in)
- Weight: 79 kg (174 lb)

Playing career^{1}
Years	Club	Games (Goals)
1974	Footscray	1 (0)
- ^{1} Playing statistics correct to the end of 1974.

Daryl Collins (born 15 July 1956) is a former Australian rules footballer who played with Footscray in the Victorian Football League (VFL).

Daryl's father Jack Cecil Collins played 31 games at Fitzroy and 13 with Essendon, he played on a wing in Essendon's 1950 premiership team. His brother Denis Collins played 147 games (100 with Footscray, 30 with Carlton and 17 with Richmond).
