= Bill Gerrand (footballer, born 1916) =

Australian rules footballer

Personal information
- Full name: Bill Gerrand
- Born: 23 December 1916
- Died: 21 July 2000 (aged 83)
- Height: 179 cm (5 ft 10 in)
- Weight: 80 kg (176 lb)

Playing career^{1}
Years	Club	Games (Goals)
1941	North Melbourne	2 (1)
- ^{1} Playing statistics correct to the end of 1941.

Bill Gerrand (23 December 1916 – 21 July 2000) was an Australian rules footballer who played with North Melbourne in the Victorian Football League (VFL).
