= Bob Strachan (footballer, born 1944) =

Australian rules footballer (born 1944)

Personal information
- Born: 8 June 1944 (age 82)
- Original team: Horsham
- Height: 183 cm (6 ft 0 in)
- Weight: 83 kg (183 lb)

Playing career^{1}
Years	Club	Games (Goals)
1963–1965	South Melbourne	7 (0)
- ^{1} Playing statistics correct to the end of 1965.

Bob Strachan (born 8 June 1944) is an Australian rules footballer who played for South Melbourne in the Victorian Football League (VFL). Strachan played seven matches in the VFL for South Melbourne between 1963 and 1965. After retiring he became a tennis umpire.
