= Bill Gerrand (footballer, born 1941) =

Australian rules footballer

Personal information
- Full name: Bill Gerrand
- Born: 23 November 1941 (age 84)
- Original team: South Bendigo (BFL)
- Height: 169 cm (5 ft 7 in)
- Weight: 72 kg (159 lb)
- Position: Rover

Playing career^{1}
Years	Club	Games (Goals)
1963	St Kilda	3 (1)
- ^{1} Playing statistics correct to the end of 1963.

Bill Gerrand (born 23 November 1941) is a former Australian rules footballer who played with St Kilda in the Victorian Football League (VFL).
