= Wally Harris (Australian footballer) =

Australian rules footballer, born 1919

Personal information
- Full name: Walter Ronald Harris
- Born: 10 June 1919; Footscray, Victoria
- Died: 7 June 2001 (aged 81)
- Original team: Footscray District League
- Height: 175 cm (5 ft 9 in)
- Weight: 72 kg (159 lb)

Playing career^{1}
Years	Club	Games (Goals)
1941–43	Footscray	20 (8)
- ^{1} Playing statistics correct to the end of 1943.

Walter Ronald Harris (10 June 1919 – 7 June 2001) was an Australian rules footballer who played with Footscray in the Victorian Football League (VFL).
