= Le Sueur (surname) =

Le Sueur or Lesueur is a French surname. Notable people with the surname include:

- Hubert Le Sueur (c. 1580–1658), French sculptor
- Jean Le Sueur (c. 1598–1668, also known as Abbé Saint-Sauveur), French-born Quebecois priest
- Eustache Le Sueur (1617–1655), painter and a founder of the French Academy
- Pierre-Charles Le Sueur (c. 1657–1704), French trapper and explorer of North America
- Jacques-François le Sueur (fl. 1704–1754), French Jesuit missionary and linguist of the Abnaki in Canada
- Jacques-Philippe Le Sueur (1759–1830), French sculptor
- Jean-François Le Sueur (1760–1837), French composer
- Charles Alexandre Lesueur (1778–1846), French naturalist-illustrator and explorer of Australia, Southeast Asia, and North America
- Pierre-Étienne Lesueur (fl. 1791–1810), French painter
- Marie Lesieur (1799–1890), known as Lesueur, French ballet dancer
- Georges Lesueur (1834–1910), French engineer, public works contractor, Senator of Algeria from 1888 to 1897
- Daniel Lesueur, pen name of Jeanne Lapauze, née Loiseau (1860–1920), French poet and novelist
- Arthur LeSueur (1867?–1950?), American socialist newspaper editor and Socialist mayor of Minot, North Dakota
- Florence LeSueur (1898–1991), African-American civil rights activist and the first female president of an NAACP chapter
- Meridel Le Sueur (née – Wharton; 1900–1996), American writer and political activist, stepdaughter of Arthur Le Sueur
- Hal LeSueur (1903–1963), American actor and elder brother of Joan Crawford
- Lucille Fay LeSueur, real name of Joan Crawford (1907–1977), film actress and sister of Hal
- Raoul Lesueur (1912–1981), French cyclist
- Bennie Le Sueur (1917–1994), Australian Rules Footballer for Footscray and Collingwood
- Joe LeSueur (1924–2001) American poet and screenwriter.
- Terry Le Sueur (born 1942?), politician and Chief Minister of Jersey
- Emily LeSueur (born 1972), US synchronized swimmer
- Éloyse Lesueur (born 1988), French long jumper
