= Le Sueur =

Le Sueur or LeSueur may refer to:

== Places in the United States ==
- Le Sueur, Minnesota, a city
- Le Sueur County, Minnesota
- Le Sueur River, a river in Minnesota
- LeSueur, Virginia

== Other uses ==
- Le Sueur (surname)
- Le Sueur, a brand of canned vegetables, associated with Green Giant
