= Alfred Steele =

American soft drink businessman (1901–1959)

Alfred Nu Steele
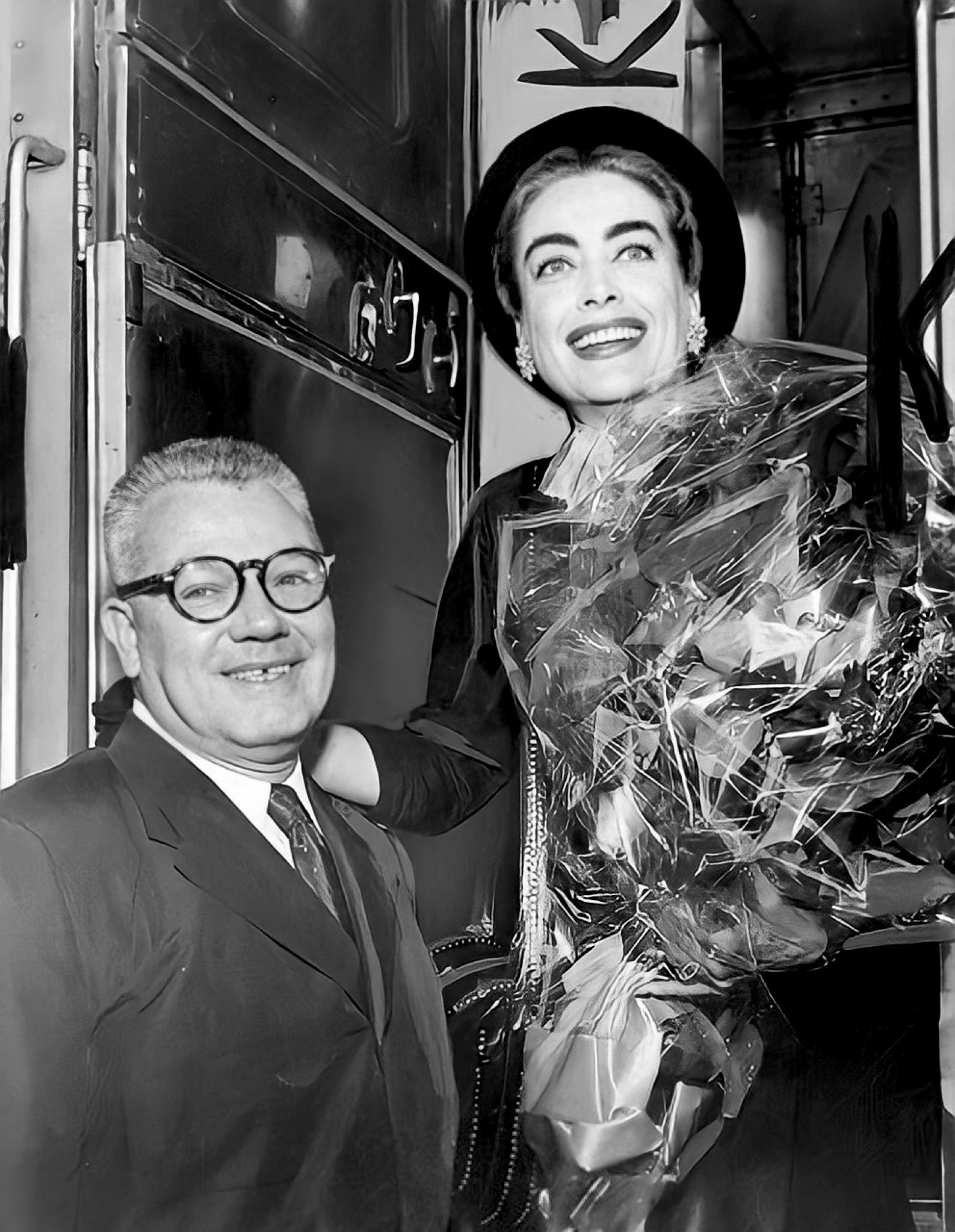
- Joan Crawford and Alfred Steele returning from their European honeymoon on August 1, 1955.
- Born: April 24, 1901; Nashville, Tennessee, US
- Died: April 19, 1959 (aged 57); New York City, US
- Resting place: Ferncliff Cemetery and Mausoleum in Hartsdale, Westchester, New York, US
- Education: Northwestern University
- Occupation: Businessman
- Spouses: Marjorie Mabel Garvey (m. 1929) Lillian Nelson (m. 1946) Joan Crawford (m. 1955)

Alfred Nu Steele (April 24, 1901 – April 19, 1959) was an American soft drink businessman who was the president and later chairman of the board of Pepsi-Cola Company from 1950 until his sudden death in 1959.

== Personal life ==
Alfred Nu Steele was born on April 24, 1901, in Nashville, Tennessee. He was the son of Edgar Alfred Steele, a teacher, and his wife Fannie Bartrem. His middle name "Nu" was an homage to his father's fraternity "Sigma Nu". The family would later move to Missouri. Steele graduated from Northwestern University in 1923, where he played football, and became an ad executive after college. He enjoyed jazz music.

Steele’s first marriage was to Marjorie Mabel Garvey on December 17, 1924, in Cook County, Illinois. They had one child named Sally Ostin Steele. Sally Steele married Lieutenant John D. Comer on November 29, 1955, at the MacArthur Chapel in Tokyo, Japan.

Alfred Steele would later marry Lillian Nelson in 1946 and they had a son named Alfred Nelson Steele in 1949. They divorced in 1955. His son would go on to marry a woman named Madeline Spence Haldeman in Montana.

Steele’s third wife was American film actress Joan Crawford; he was her fourth husband. They married spontaneously on May 10, 1955, at the Flamingo Hotel in Las Vegas. Judge John Mendoza officiated. Steele took on the father role for Crawford's four adopted children - Christina, Christopher, and twins Cathy and Cynthia ("Cindy"). The family would be seen at events throughout the marriage and go on vacations together. The twins grew closer to Steele; he was listed as Cathy Crawford's father in her 2020 obituary.

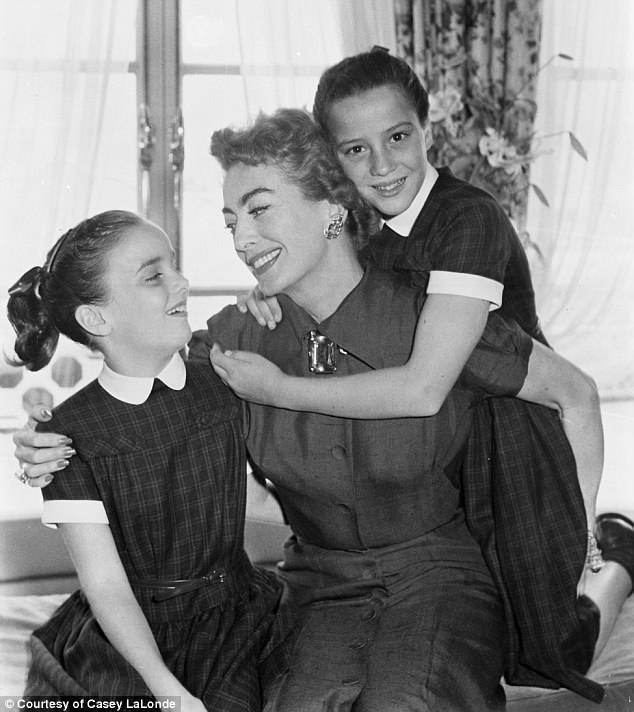
Joan Crawford with their adopted twins Cathy and Cynthia "Cindy"

Following Steele's death, Herbert L. Barnet, Steele's handpicked successor as chairman and CEO, appointed Crawford to the board of directors. In her later career, product placement for Pepsi was included in several films including Strait-Jacket (1964) and Berserk! (1967). Crawford would remain on the Pepsi-Cola board of directors until 1973. “I thought I could be different, that I could have it all," said Joan Crawford after Steele died. "And I did — for a little while — with Alfred. I’ll always treasure our brief time together.”

In 1956, the couple moved to New York, purchasing and merging two top-floor apartments at 2 East 70th Street into a spacious eight-room family penthouse with views of Central Park. Broadway columnists dubbed it "Taj Joan." While work was being completed, they stayed at the Waldorf Astoria. Construction took a year and cost $387,011.65 USD ($4.06 million USD adjusted for inflation in 2023). The apartment was decorated by Crawford’s close friend, interior designer William Haines, totaling an extra $80,000.00 USD ($840,000.00 USD adjusted for inflation in 2023). The apartment was paid for by Pepsi as a loan with 6% interest; the loan was repaid in 1958.

== Career ==
Alfred Steele began as a geologist, and went on to work for the Chicago Tribune, Standard Oil of Indiana, and D'arcy Advertising Company.

While working for the Union Bed & Spring Company, Steele conceived the "Sono-Meter", a device that measured the energy lost while people tossed and turned on an uncomfortable mattress. The company's sales increased 80% within nine months.

Later, Steele became vice president of marketing for The Coca-Cola Company on June 14, 1945. While at Coca-Cola, he earned the nickname "Pally" as he often remarked, "Let's try this out, Pally".

In 1949, Steele took over as vice president of Pepsi-Cola, and as president later that year. In 1950, he became CEO, appointing Herbert L. Barnet as the new president. In a five-year span, Steele helped steer profits up 112% compared to Coca-Cola which had only climbed 28%. Steele defined his strategy as “Beat Coke”. Under his leadership, the company launched massive advertising campaigns and sales promotions during the '50s, resulting in an 11-fold increase in net earnings. Sales tripled between 1955 and 1957. As a result, Pepsi-Cola became Coca-Cola's primary competitor.

While opening a plant in Atlanta, Steele remarked Coca-Cola was not Pepsi's biggest competitor - tea and coffee were. He added, "It's a tribute to the Coca-Cola Company that the number of its former employees are on the management team helping Pepsi-Cola move up."

Steele is credited with helping push the change of the old Pepsi slogan "twice as much for a nickel, too" stating it was a liability to the company, reducing Pepsi to the "poor man's Coca-Cola". He pushed for a focus on quality, not quantity. Other initiatives for Pepsi were the adaptation of vending machines, global expansion for selling and producing, and for the parent company to help arrange funds with banks for bottlers to buy equipment with no down payment. In 1957, Crawford and Steele toured Europe, the Middle East, and Africa for Pepsi-Cola’s recent expansion.

Steele introduced new cost accounting methods and helped bottlers purchase new trucks and equipment. He further reduced the sugar content and unsweetened the syrup of Pepsi products, and introduced Pepsi to developing countries. Under Steele's leadership, Pepsi built a new headquarters at 500 Park Avenue in New York City.

Once during a meeting, a colleague suggested that Steele should use his wife’s star power to increase sales. Steele refused, but Crawford said she was happy to assist if it would benefit her husband. According to Steele, "I hate to use my wife to help me sell, but let's face it — she does. On these trips, most of our business is done through top government officials. At those levels, Crawford is fabulous." Some credit this as one of the first instances of using celebrity power to sell products. To quote a 1956 New York Times article: "Together [Alfred Steele and Joan Crawford] constitute one of the most successful teams in America's public and private life."

In 1957, 11-year-old Chester Arnold Jr. was given five shares of Pepsi, but after watching The Solid Gold Cadillac, the boy was compelled to write to Steele. In the letter, Arnold asked Steele if having the shares meant he was “crooked like those people in the movie.” Steele wrote back, inviting Chester and his family to New York to meet him and see the company. Steele supplied accommodations for the family at the Waldorf Astoria. For three days, the family was shown around the city and spent time with Steele and Crawford. They attended board meetings and were escorted by police to one of the most elaborate ribbon-cutting ceremonies Pepsi-Cola hosted at the time.

Alfred Steele was selected as chairman of the 1959 fund campaign of the National Multiple Sclerosis Society on November 6, 1958. He died before the event. Joan Crawford was named chairman in his place. The fund was renamed the "Alfred N. Steele Memorial Campaign for the MS Hope Chest."

== Death ==
Alfred Steele and Joan Crawford's grave at Ferncliff Cemetery and Mausoleum

On the morning of April 19, 1959, five days before his 58th birthday, Steele was found on the floor next to his bed by Crawford, who immediately called a doctor. A traumatized Crawford covered Steele in blankets and yelled "Get warm, get warm!" The physician who examined Steele pronounced him dead of a massive heart attack. His death came as a shock to his colleagues, friends, and family, who praised him for his leadership and vision at Pepsi-Cola.

Steele’s funeral was held April 22, 1959, at New York's Saint Thomas Episcopal Church. Nearly 1200 people attended. His remains were interred in Ferncliff Cemetery and Mausoleum in Hartsdale, Westchester, New York. Upon Crawford's death in 1977, the couple's ashes were interred in a crypt together.

Two years after Steele's death, on January 8, 1961, Crawford and twins Cathy and Cynthia unveiled a plaque honoring Steele at the Albert Einstein Medical Center in Philadelphia, Pennsylvania.

== Film and television appearances ==
Film and television appearances
Film	Year	Role	Notes
Hollywood Greats	1978	Self	(S2 E1) Archive footage
Joan Crawford: Always The Star	1996	Self	Archive footage
Joan Crawford: The Ultimate Star	2002	Self	Archive footage
