= Jacques-Philippe Le Sueur =

French sculptor

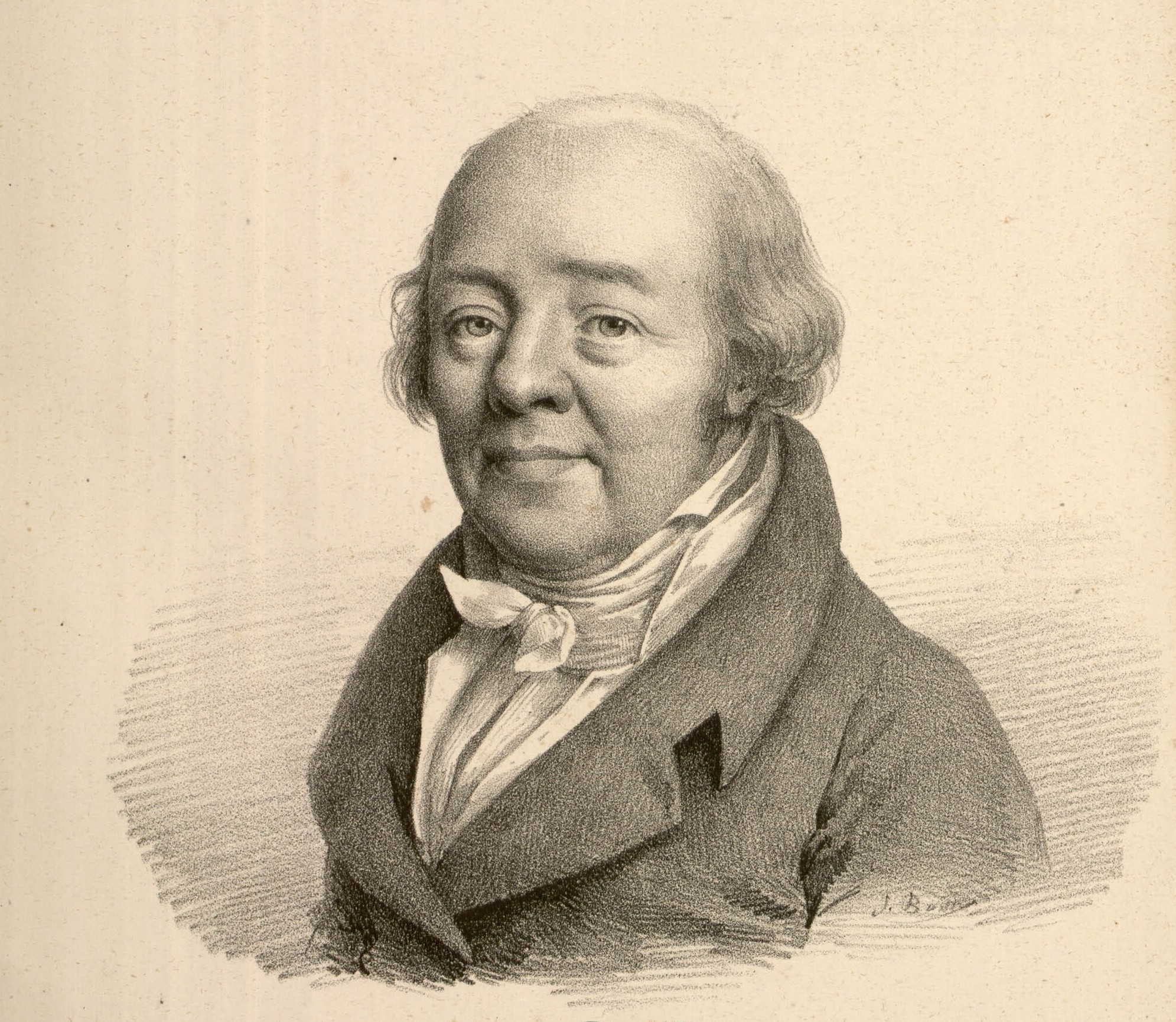
Portrait of Jacques-Philippe Le Sueur, lithograph by Julien-Léopold Boilly

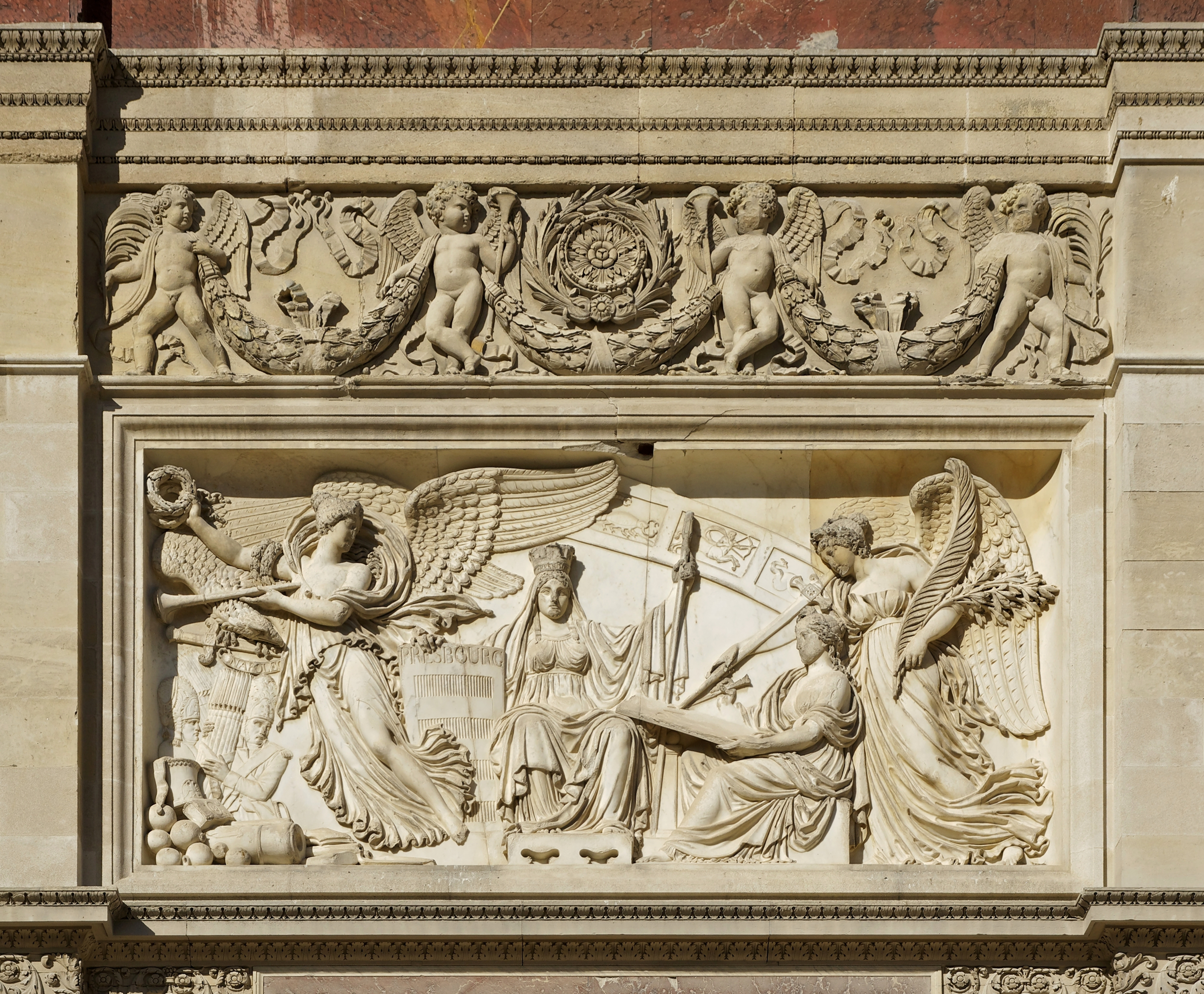
The Peace of Pressburg on the Arc de Triomphe du Carrousel

Jacques-Philippe Le Sueur (French pronunciation: [ʒak filip lə sɥœʁ]; 1759–1830), was a French sculptor.

== Biography ==
Le Sueur was born at Paris on 24 March 1759. A pupil of François-Joseph Duret, he was remarked in his early youth, and was only 21 years old when Girardin commissioned him to chisel the cenotaph of Jean-Jacques Rousseau, located on the ile des Peupliers at the Ermenonville park.

Having carried off the Prix de Rome of sculpture, he went to that city in 1780; upon his return to France, Nicolas Beaujon asked him to execute a group of the three Graces.

Afterwards he had work orders from the government; the most remarkable were one of the bas-reliefs which decorated the peristyle of the Pantheon; the Peace of Pressburg for the Arc de Triomphe du Carrousel; one of the pediments of the inner court of the Louvre Palace; a statue of Montaigne, placed in the town of Libourne, and that of the bailli de Suffren given in that museum under the # 232.

Le Sueur was nominated at the Institut de France in 1816, and the Legion of Honor was conferred upon him in 1828. He died in Paris on 4 December 1830.

== Sources ==
- Réveil, Étienne Achille; Duchesne, Jean (1834). Museum of painting and sculpture (in French). Vol. 16. London: Bossange, Barthes and Lowell. p. 233.
