= Florence LeSueur =

African-American civil right activist and first female NAACP leader (1898–1991)

- Born: Florence Ruth Barrett; March 17, 1898; McKean Township, Pennsylvania
- Died: June 27, 1991 (aged 93); Brockton, Massachusetts
- Known for: civic activist and leader

Florence Ruth LeSueur (March 17, 1898 – June 27, 1991) was an African-American civic leader, activist and the first woman president of an NAACP chapter. She was a champion of black rights in employment and education.

== Early life ==
She was born as Florence Ruth Barrett on March 17, 1898, to Frank C. and Maude (née Lawson) Barrett in Pennsylvania. She attended Wilberforce University and later moved to Boston in 1935. LeSueur had been a long-time resident of the South End, a neighborhood in Boston, Massachusetts.

== Career ==
Florence LeSueur was the first to head a Boston-wide education committee under the NAACP. From 1948 until 1951 she served as the president of the Boston branch of the NAACP, and was the first woman president of a branch in the nation. She was recognized for her role of being the first female president of an NAACP Branch when the 41st Annual NAACP Convention took place in 1950. She was joined in attendance at the conference by fellow Massachusetts residents, Boston mayor, John B. Hynes, and Lieutenant Governor Charles E. Jeff Sullivan. Topics being discussed at the conference included "The Church and the NAACP" and "Registration and Voting."

LeSueur also worked on the founding of METCO (Metropolitan Council for Education Opportunity) alongside Ruth Batson. The goal was to bus intercity students in Boston to suburban schools in an attempt to desegregate Boston's schools. LeSueur's granddaughter, was one of the first participants in this program, arriving at East Junior High School in Braintree, Massachusetts. She recalls press and photographers outside the school as she left the bus. METCO also assisted parents with fighting for their children's quality of education, as many of the inner city kids were not placed in college prep classes at these newly integrated schools.

Florence LeSueur supported and signed a letter with fellow members of the NAACP against the Rankin bill, H.R. 314, in Congress. This letter was sent with support from the NAACP organization on May 24, 1951. This bill created a segregated veterans hospital in Franklin County, Mississippi. The letter that LeSueur signed argued that the location of the hospital would be inaccessible and unnecessary because the veterans were not subjected to segregation while they were fighting in the war and should not be afterwards.

During her time with the NAACP, six black men were hired as Boston Elevated Railway drivers (the predecessor of the Massachusetts Bay Transportation Authority), due to her unrelenting determination. In order to persuade transit system officials that blacks deserved better job roles, LeSueur organized demonstrations near the Dudley Square station and she led delegations for the cause. These actions eventually resulted in getting blacks hired at a higher job level as drivers. For more than 20 years she was a director of the NAACP branch. Additionally, in 1959 she served as president of the Harriet Tubman House (now part of United South End Settlements).

In her later years in the 1970s, along with her daughter The Rev. Leota Ruth Santos, together they founded a church out of the basement of Florence's home in Brockton, Massachusetts. The Church was named "The United Church of The First Born." The church congregation later moved to a site in Hanson, Massachusetts.

== Personal life ==
She died on June 27, 1991, at age 93 in a nursing home in Brockton, Massachusetts. She was a mother to eleven children and a grandmother to fifty two grandchildren. LeSueur also befriended Eleanor Roosevelt while fighting for civil rights.
