= Hal LeSueur =

American actor (1903–1963)

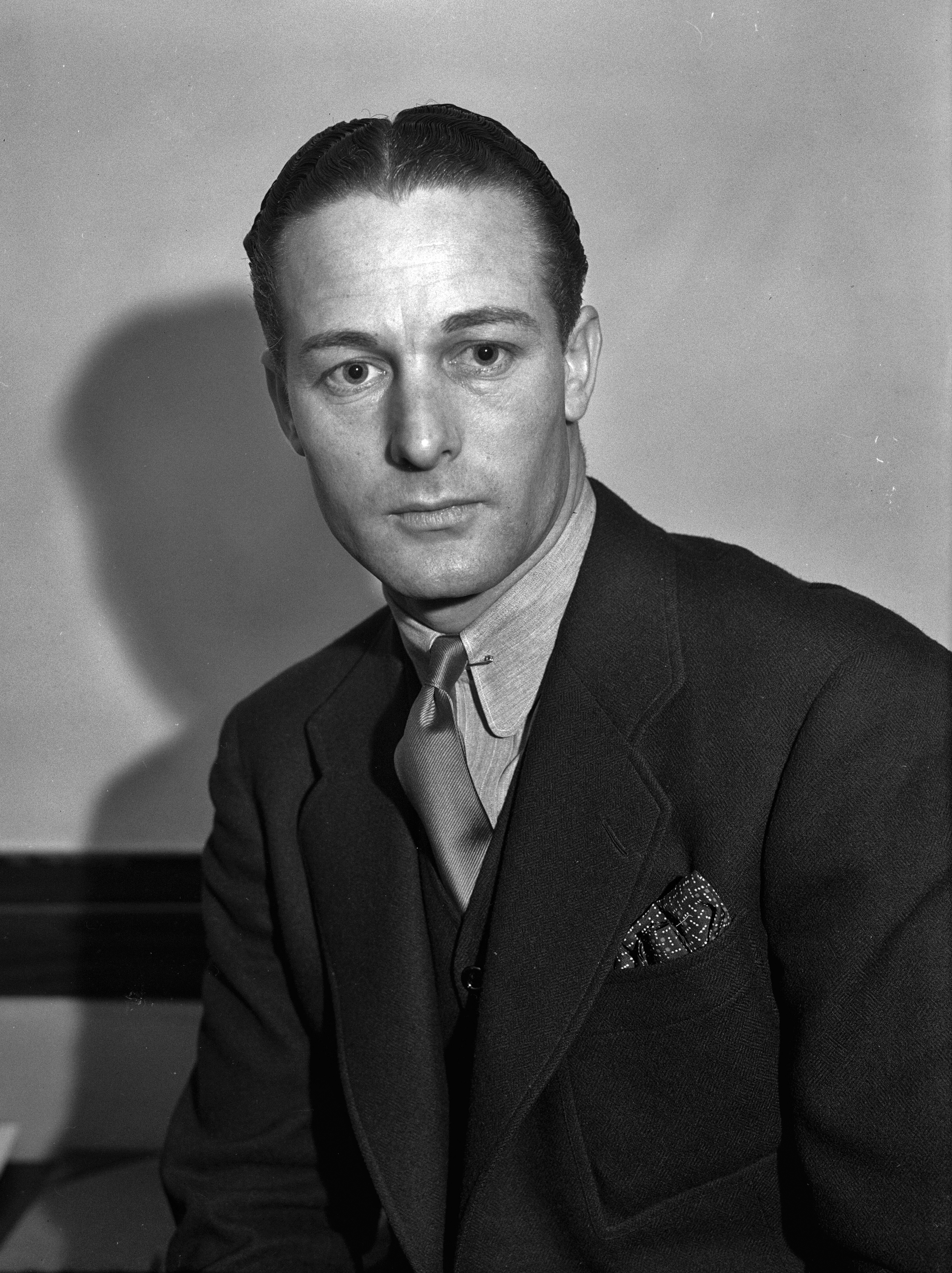
- LeSueur in 1936
- Born: Hal Hays LeSueur; September 3, 1901 or 1903; San Antonio, Texas, U.S.
- Died: May 3, 1963 (aged 59–61); Los Angeles, California, U.S.

Hal Hays LeSueur (September 3, 1901, or 1903 – May 3, 1963) was an American actor and the brother of Oscar-winning film star Joan Crawford.

== Early life ==
Hal LeSueur was born on September 3, 1903, at 326 Rivas Street, San Antonio, Texas, the first child of Thomas E. LeSueur (1867–1938) and Anna Bell Johnson (1884–1958). His older half-sister was Daisy McConnell (1901–1904) and his younger sister was Lucille Fay LeSueur (190?–1977), who later became an actress with the stage name Joan Crawford. After Thomas had abandoned the family, Anna wed businessman Henry J. Cassin. The family lived in Lawton, Oklahoma, then moved to Kansas City, Missouri, in 1917. Hal LeSueur moved from Kansas City around 1928 to Los Angeles. He found work in the stock department at MGM in bit parts or as an extra.

== Marriages ==
LeSueur's first wife was Jessie Burress. They wed on October 21, 1922, in Kansas City, Missouri (age given as 21) and divorced in 1929. His second wife was Kasha Haroldi. Hal and Kasha married in Santa Ana, California, on September 16, 1931, with Hal's age given as 30. They had one child, a daughter, named Joan Crawford LeSueur (1933–1999), who was named after Hal's sister and became a dancer on Broadway, known professionally as Joan Lowe. Kasha and Hal LeSueur divorced in 1935. She won custody of their daughter. She remarried and became Mrs. Kasha Lowe; her daughter became Joan Lowe, the name by which she was known professionally, later Mrs. Joan Fowler.

== Controversy ==
On November 9, 1935, LeSueur was in a head-on collision at the top of Cahuenga Pass. The other car caught fire and the three people inside (Earl Gose, who was driving; his wife, Golda; and his sister, Grace) were pulled from the blaze. Their car burned to a charred hulk. LeSueur suffered severe cuts and bruises on his hands, face, arms and legs. The other people were also seriously injured. All were taken to a hospital in Hollywood. The injuries of Grace Gose proved fatal three days later. His mother, Anna, and his ex-wife, Kasha, accompanied him to the coroner's inquest on November 15. Earl and Golda Gose were unable to appear. LeSueur testified that he was driving near the center of the highway when the other car suddenly pulled out from behind another car into his lane and he was unable to avoid the collision. The Coroner's jury exonerated him of blame for the crash, returning a verdict of accidental death.

In February 1936, Earl and Golda Gose sued him, seeking $86,400 in damages. Golda, who was taken into court on a hospital stretcher, which was placed before the jury box, testified that LeSueur was driving on the wrong side of Cahuenga Boulevard when his car collided with theirs. LeSueur not only denied responsibility for the accident, but in his cross-complaint for $10,000 charged that the crash came about through Gose's negligent driving. The suit was then abruptly dropped, however, when a settlement was reached. LeSueur agreed to pay them $8,500, one tenth of what they had originally sought.

== Later years and death ==
Tired of being an uncredited actor in the films on which he worked, he decided to try his hand at make-up work at MGM for a while. When he left that job, he worked as a sporting goods salesman. LeSueur made one final movie appearance, playing a reporter in Jeanne Eagels (1957). He made one TV appearance in an episode of the series State Trooper, titled No Fancy Cowboys, which aired on March 13, 1957. When he left the sporting goods business, LeSueur began working as a desk clerk at a Los Angeles hotel, and supplemented his income working as a switchboard operator at the motel where he lived.

LeSueur died of a ruptured appendix on May 3, 1963 at the Los Angeles General Hospital. He was interred in Forest Lawn Cemetery, Glendale, California. His sister, Joan Crawford reportedly sent him telegrams from New York to the hospital before he died, but did not attend his funeral.

== Filmography ==
Films listed below were distributed by Metro-Goldwyn-Mayer, except for Jeanne Eagels which as distributed by Columbia Pictures.

Year	Title	Role	Notes
1935	Mutiny on the Bounty	Millard	Uncredited
1936	After the Thin Man	Polly's Admirer	Uncredited
1937	Mama Steps Out	Steward With Key	Uncredited
1937	Bad Guy	Prison Switchboard Operator	Uncredited
1937	My Dear Miss Aldrich	Reporter	Uncredited
1937	Madame X	Spectator	Uncredited
1937	Mannequin	Tout	Uncredited
1938	Man-Proof	Guest in Drawing Room	Uncredited
1938	The Girl of the Golden West	Adjutant	Uncredited
1938	Judge Hardy's Children	Joe, the Chauffeur	Uncredited
1938	Three Comrades	Dancer Who Stumbles with Erich	Uncredited
1938	The Toy Wife	First Brother	Uncredited
1938	The Crowd Roars	Usher at Madison Square Garden	Uncredited
1939	Dancing Co-Ed	Boy	Uncredited
1940	I Take This Woman	Man in Cafe	(scenes deleted)
1940	Broadway Melody of 1940	Casey's Chauffeur	Uncredited
1940	The Golden Fleecing	Clerk	Uncredited
1940	Sky Murder	Al, co-pilot	Uncredited
1940	Dulcy	Businessman in Meeting	Uncredited
1940	Flight Command	Hell Cat	Uncredited
1941	Respect the Law	Reporter	Film short, Uncredited
1941	The Big Store	Chauffeur	Uncredited
1941	Married Bachelor	Man vying for table in cafe	Uncredited
1941	Shadow of the Thin Man	Reporter	Uncredited
1942	The Bugle Sounds	Recruit	Uncredited
1942	Whistling in Dixie	Sound Effects Man	Uncredited
1942	Stand by for Action	Lookout	Uncredited
1957	Jeanne Eagels	Reporter	Uncredited
