= LeSueur, Virginia =

Unincorporated community in Virginia, United States

Coordinates: 37°40′59″N 78°21′15″W

LeSueur is an unincorporated community in Buckingham County, in the U.S. state of Virginia.
