= Joan Crawford =

American actress (1904?–1977)

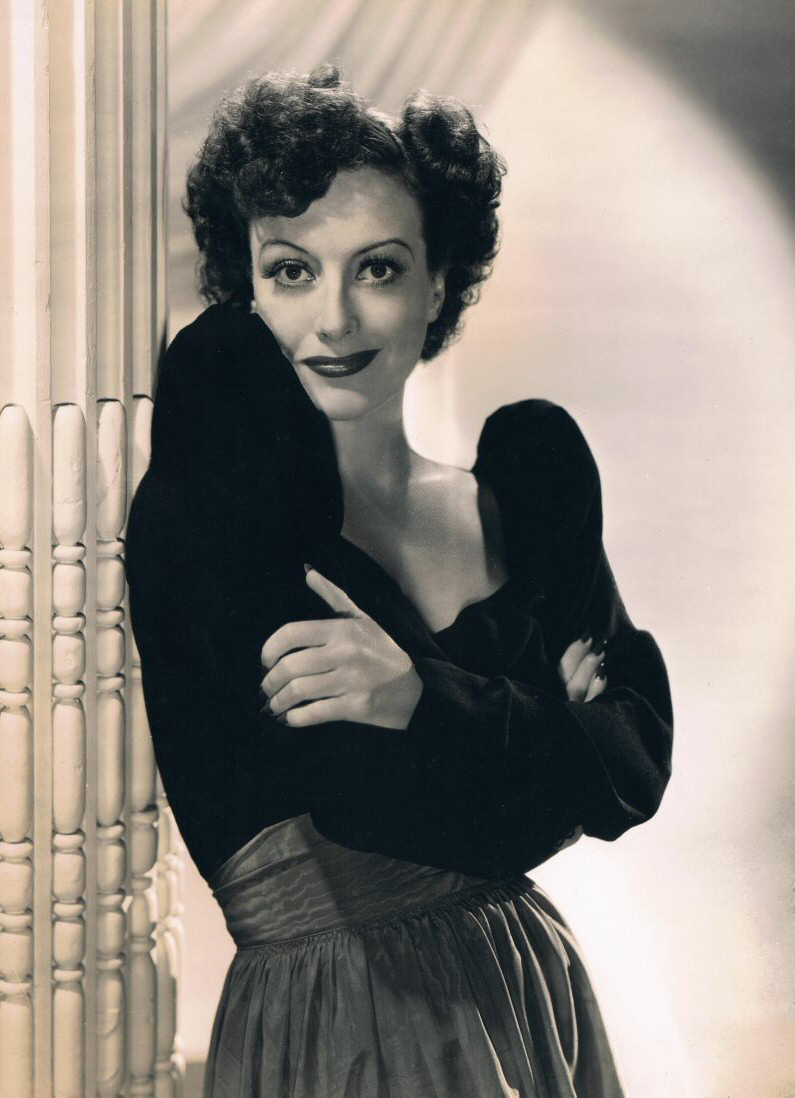
- Crawford in 1939
- Born: Lucille Fay LeSueur; March 23, 1904–1908 (Note: Crawford's year of birth is uncertain, as various sources claim 1904, 1905, 1906, 1907, and 1908. Crawford herself widely claimed 1908 (the date on her tombstone). Crawford's daughter Christina asserts it was 1904 in the biography Mommie Dearest, published in 1978.); San Antonio, Texas, U.S.
- Died: May 10, 1977 (aged 69–73); New York City, U.S.
- Resting place: Ferncliff Cemetery, Hartsdale, New York, U.S.
- Occupations: Actress; businesswoman
- Years active: 1924–1972
- Works: Full list
- Spouses: Douglas Fairbanks Jr. (m. 1929; div. 1933) Franchot Tone (m. 1935; div. 1939) Phillip Terry (m. 1942; div. 1946) Alfred Steele (m. 1955; died 1959)
- Children: 4, including Christina
- Relatives: Hal LeSueur (brother)

Joan Crawford (born Lucille Fay LeSueur; March 23, 1904–1908 – May 10, 1977) was an American actress. She began her career as a dancer in traveling theatrical companies before debuting on Broadway. Crawford was signed to a motion-picture contract by Metro-Goldwyn-Mayer in 1925. Initially frustrated by the size and quality of her roles, Crawford launched a publicity campaign and built an image as a nationally known flapper by the end of the 1920s. By the 1930s, Crawford's fame rivaled MGM colleagues Norma Shearer and Greta Garbo. Crawford often played hardworking young women who manage to find romance and financial success. These "rags-to-riches" stories were well received by Depression-era audiences and were popular with women. Crawford became one of Hollywood's most prominent movie stars and one of the highest paid women in the United States, but her films began losing money. By the end of the 1930s, she was labeled "box office poison".

After an absence of nearly two years from the screen, Crawford staged a comeback by starring in Mildred Pierce (1945), for which she won the Academy Award for Best Actress. In 1955, she became involved with the Pepsi-Cola Company, through her marriage to company president Alfred Steele. After his death in 1959, Crawford was elected to fill his vacancy on the board of directors, retiring in 1973. She continued acting in film and television regularly through the 1960s, when her performances became fewer; after the release of the horror film Trog in 1970, Crawford retired from the screen. She withdrew from public life and became increasingly reclusive until her death in 1977.

Crawford married four times. Her first three marriages ended in divorce; the last ended with the death of husband Al Steele. She adopted five children, one of whom was reclaimed by his birth mother. Crawford's relationships with her two older children, Christina and Christopher, were acrimonious. Crawford disinherited the two and, after Crawford's death, Christina published the tell-all memoir Mommie Dearest.

== Early life ==
Born Lucille Fay LeSueur, of French-Huguenot, English, Dutch, and Irish ancestry in San Antonio, Texas, she was the youngest of two children of Thomas E. LeSueur (born January 2, 1867, in Tennessee; died January 1, 1938), a construction worker, and Anna Bell Johnson (died August 15, 1958), later known as Anna Cassin. Crawford's mother was likely under 20 when her first two children were born. Crawford had one half-sister, Daisy McConnell (1901–1904), and one brother, Hal LeSueur.

Thomas LeSueur abandoned the family when Lucille was ten months old, eventually resettling in Abilene, Texas, reportedly working in construction. In 1909, while working as a sales associate at Simpson's, Crawford's mother married Henry J. Cassin (1868–1922) in Fort Worth, who is incorrectly listed in the 1910 census as her second husband rather than her third. They lived in Lawton, Oklahoma, where Cassin ran the Ramsey Opera House, booking such diverse and noted performers as Anna Pavlova and Eva Tanguay. As a child, Crawford, who preferred the nickname "Billie", enjoyed watching vaudeville acts perform on the stage of her stepfather's theater. At that time, Crawford was reportedly unaware that Cassin, whom she called "Daddy", was not her biological father; her brother later told her the truth.

From childhood, Crawford's ambition was to be a dancer. One day, in an attempt to escape piano lessons, she leapt from the front porch of her home and cut her foot severely on a broken milk bottle. She had three surgeries to repair the damage, and for 18 months was unable to attend elementary school or continue dancing lessons.

In June 1917, the family moved to Kansas City, Missouri, after Cassin was accused of embezzlement; although acquitted, he was blacklisted in Lawton. After the move, Cassin, a Catholic, placed Crawford at St. Agnes Academy in Kansas City. When her mother and stepfather separated, she remained at school as a work student, where she spent far more time working, primarily cooking and cleaning, than studying. She later attended Rockingham Academy, also as a working student. While there, she began dating, and had her first serious relationship: a trumpet player, Ray Sterling, who reportedly inspired her to challenge herself academically.

In 1922, she registered at Stephens College in Columbia, Missouri, giving her year of birth as 1906. She attended Stephens for a few months and then withdrew after she realized that she was not ready for college. Due to her family's instability, Crawford's schooling never surpassed the primary level.

== Career ==
=== 1924–1925: Early career ===
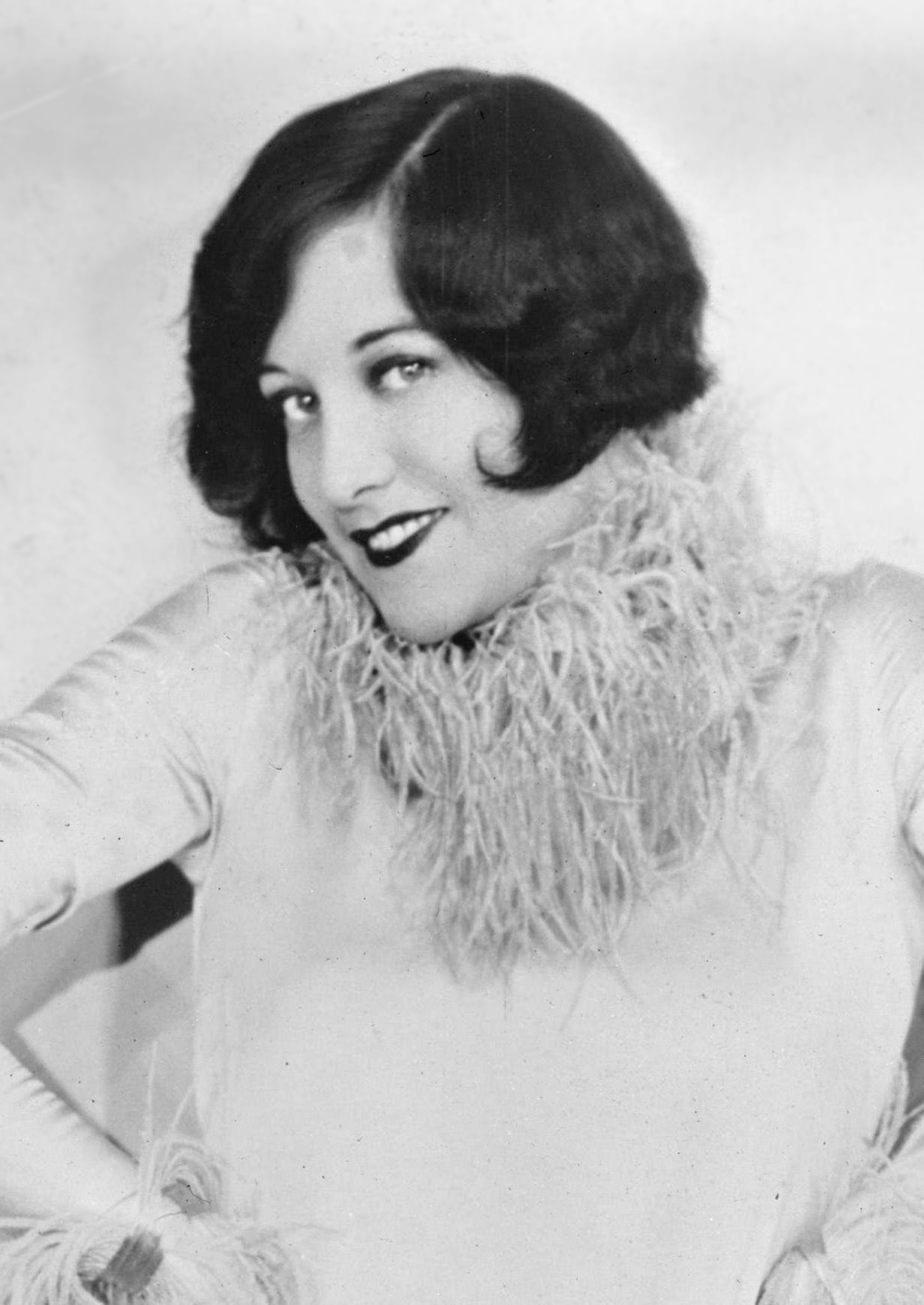
Crawford in 1925

Under the name Lucille LeSueur, Crawford began dancing in the choruses of traveling revues, and was spotted dancing in Detroit by producer Jacob J. Shubert. Shubert put her in the chorus line for his 1924 show, Innocent Eyes, at the Winter Garden Theatre on Broadway in New York City. While appearing in Innocent Eyes, Crawford met a saxophone player named James Welton. The two were allegedly married in 1924, and lived together for several months, although this supposed marriage was never mentioned in later life by Crawford.

Crawford wanted additional work, and approached Loews Theaters publicist Nils Granlund. Granlund secured a position for her with singer Harry Richman's act and arranged for her to do a screen test, which he sent to producer Harry Rapf in Hollywood. Rapf notified Granlund on December 24, 1924, that Metro-Goldwyn-Mayer (MGM) had offered Crawford a contract at $75 a week. Granlund immediately wired Crawford, who had returned to her mother's home in Kansas City, with the news; she borrowed $400 for travel expenses.

Credited as Lucille LeSueur, her first film was Lady of the Night in 1925, as the body double for Norma Shearer, MGM's most popular female star. She also appeared in The Circle and Pretty Ladies (both 1925), starring comedian ZaSu Pitts. This was soon followed by equally small and unbilled roles in two other 1925 silent films: The Only Thing, and The Merry Widow.

MGM publicity head Pete Smith recognized her ability to become a major star, but felt her name sounded fake; he told studio head Louis B. Mayer that her last name, LeSueur, reminded him of a sewer. Smith organized a contest called "Name the Star" in Movie Weekly to allow readers to select her new stage name. The initial choice was "Joan Arden", but after another actress was found to have prior claim to that name, the alternative surname "Crawford" became the choice. She later said that she wanted her first name to be pronounced Jo-Anne, and that she hated the name Crawford because it sounded like "crawfish", but also admitted she "liked the security" that went with the name.

=== 1925–1928: Self-promotion and early successes ===
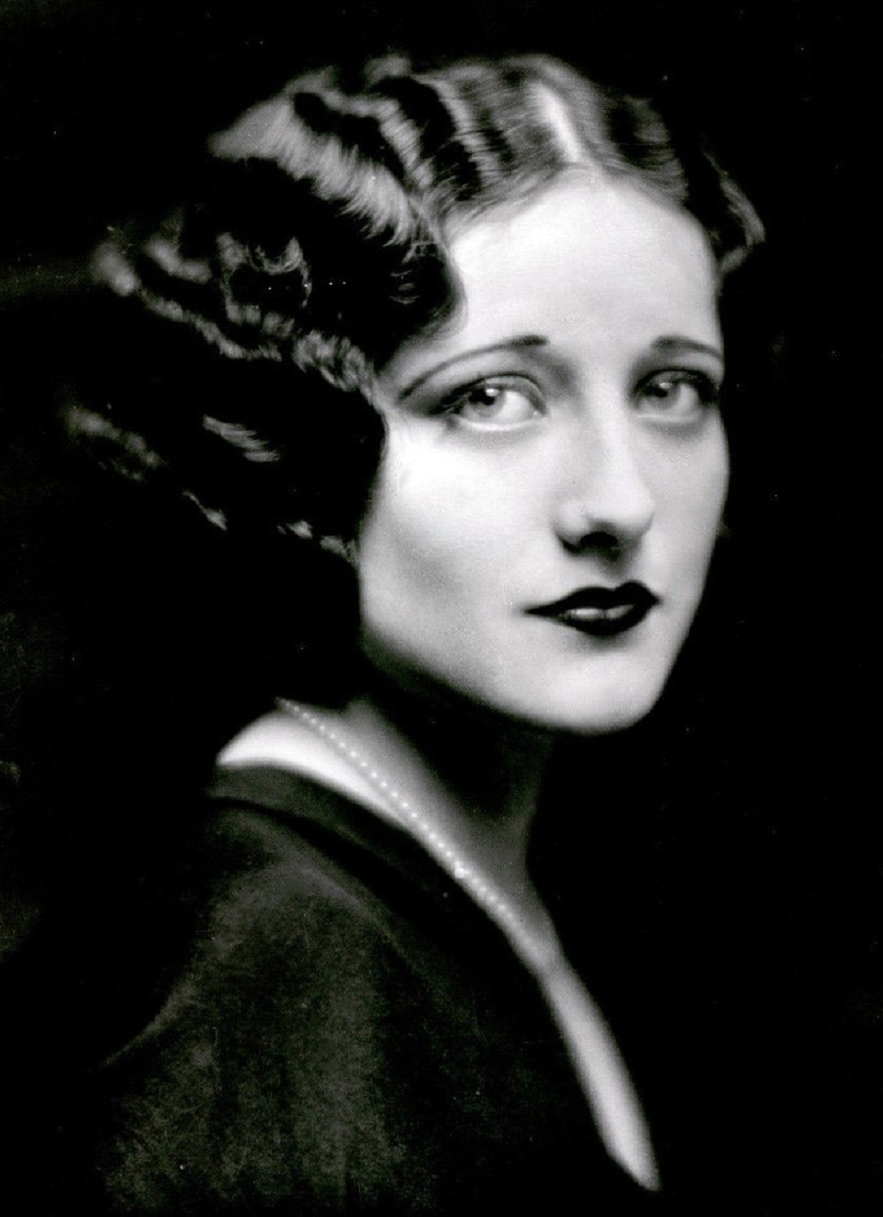
Studio portrait (1925)

Growing increasingly frustrated over the size and quality of the parts she was given, Crawford embarked on a campaign of self-promotion. As MGM screenwriter Frederica Sagor Maas recalled, "No one decided to make Joan Crawford a star. Joan Crawford became a star because Joan Crawford decided to become a star." She began attending dances in the afternoons and evenings at hotels around Hollywood and at dance venues on the beach piers, where she often won dance competitions with her performances of the Charleston and the Black Bottom.

Her strategy worked, and MGM cast her in the film where she first made an impression on audiences, Edmund Goulding's Sally, Irene and Mary (1925). From the beginning of her career, Crawford considered Norma Shearer – the studio's most-popular actress – her professional nemesis. Shearer was married to MGM Head of Production Irving Thalberg; hence, she had the first choice of scripts, and had more control than other stars in what films she would and would not make. Crawford was quoted to have said: "How can I compete with Norma? She sleeps with the boss!"

Crawford was named one of 1926's WAMPAS Baby Stars, along with Mary Astor, Dolores del Río, Janet Gaynor, and Fay Wray, among others. That same year, she co-starred in Paris with Charles Ray. Within a few years, she became the romantic lead to many of MGM's top male stars, including Ramón Novarro, John Gilbert, William Haines, and Tim McCoy.

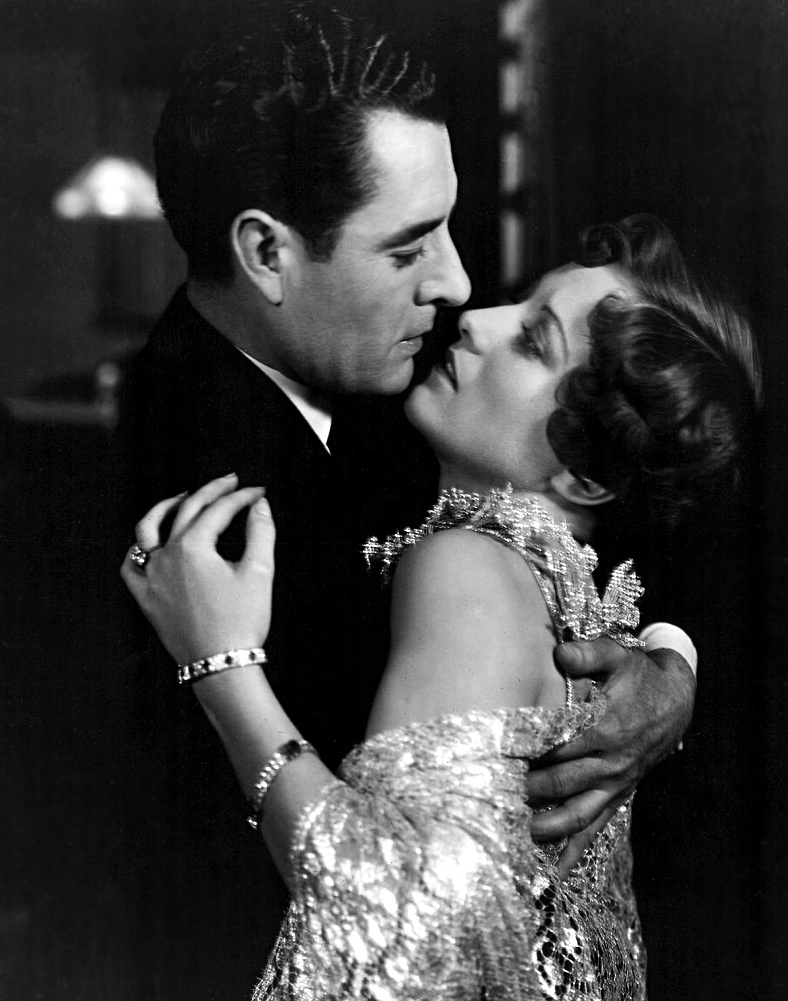
With John Gilbert in the film Four Walls (1928)

Crawford appeared as a skimpily clad young carnival assistant in The Unknown (1927), which stars Lon Chaney, Sr. as a carnival knife thrower with no arms who hopes to marry Crawford's character. She stated that she learned more about acting from watching Chaney work than from anyone else in her career. "It was then", she said, "I became aware for the first time of the difference between standing in front of a camera, and acting." Also in 1927, she appeared alongside her close friend William Haines in Spring Fever, which was the first of three movies that the two made together.

In 1928, Crawford starred opposite Ramón Novarro in Across to Singapore, but it was her role as Diana Medford in Our Dancing Daughters (1928) that catapulted her to stardom. The role established her as a symbol of modern 1920s-style femininity who rivaled Clara Bow, the original It girl, and Hollywood's foremost flapper. A stream of hits followed Our Dancing Daughters, including two more flapper-themed movies, in which Crawford embodied for her legion of fans (many of whom were women) an idealized vision of the free-spirited, all-American girl.

F. Scott Fitzgerald wrote of Crawford:

Joan Crawford is doubtless the best example of the flapper, the girl you see in smart night clubs, gowned to the apex of sophistication, toying iced glasses with a remote, faintly bitter expression, dancing deliciously, laughing a great deal, with wide, hurt eyes. Young things with a talent for living.

Crawford described her glamorous onscreen persona more succinctly, saying, "If you want to see the girl next door, go next door."

=== 1929–1936: Transition to sound and continued success ===
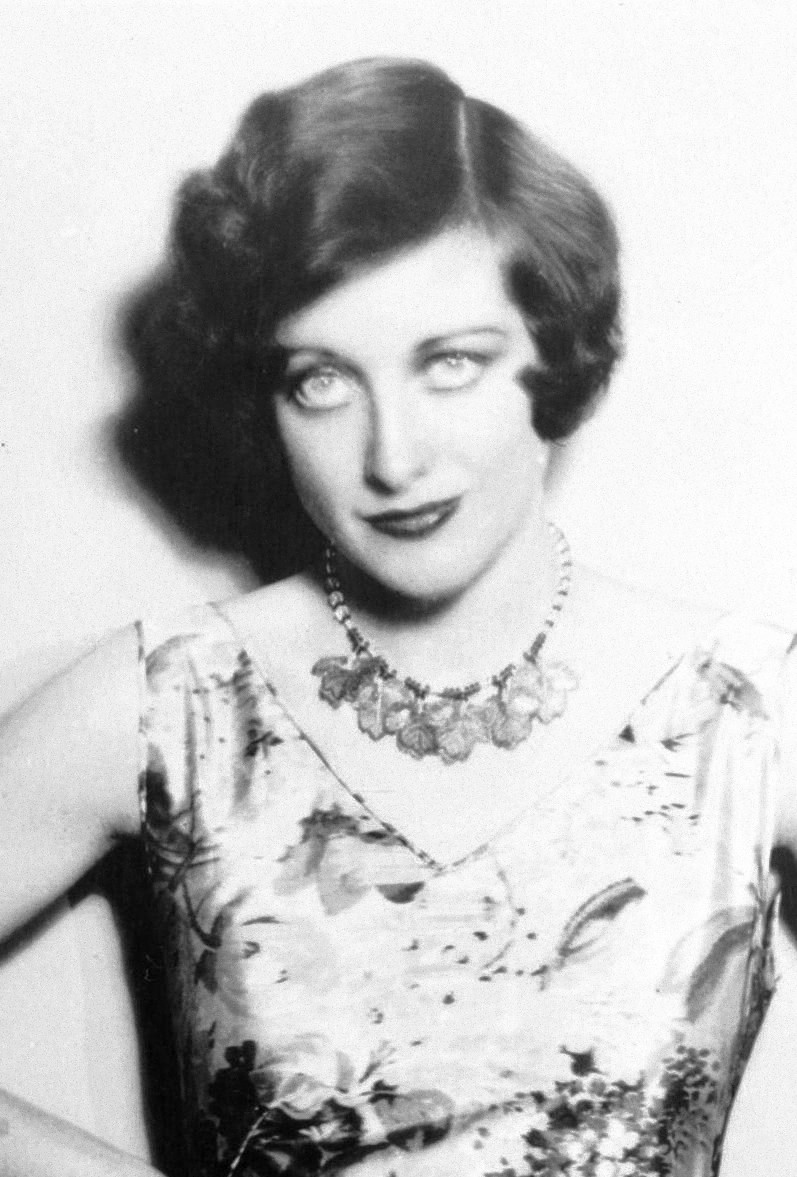
Crawford in 1928

After the release of The Jazz Singer in 1927—the first feature-length film with some audible dialogue—sound films became all the rage. The transition from silent to sound caused panic for many, if not all, involved with the film industry; many silent film stars found themselves unemployable because of their undesirable voices and hard-to-understand accents, or simply because of their refusal to make the transition to talkies. Many studios and stars avoided making the transition as long as possible, especially MGM, which was the last of the major studios to switch over to sound. The Hollywood Revue of 1929 was one of the studio's first all-talking films, and their first attempt to showcase their stars' ability to make the transition from silent to sound. Crawford was among the dozen or more MGM stars included in the movie; she sang the song "Got a Feeling for You" during the film's first act. She studied singing with Estelle Liebling, the voice teacher of Beverly Sills, in the 1920s and 1930s.

To rid herself of her Southwestern accent, Crawford tirelessly practiced diction and elocution. She said:

If I were to speak lines, it would be a good idea, I thought, to read aloud to myself, listen carefully to my voice quality and enunciation, and try to learn in that manner. I would lock myself in my room and read newspapers, magazines and books aloud. At my elbow, I kept a dictionary. When I came to a word I did not know how to pronounce, I looked it up and repeated it correctly fifteen times.

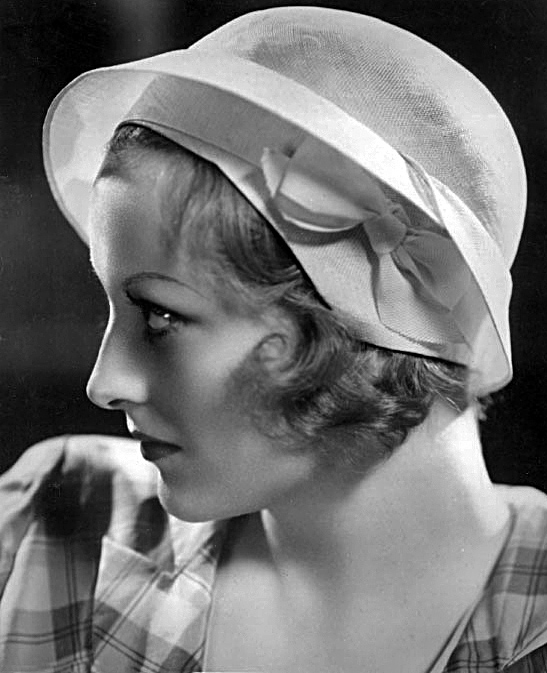
Crawford in 1932

Crawford made a successful transition to talkies with her first starring role in the all-talking feature-length film Untamed (1929), co-starring Robert Montgomery. Despite the success of the film at the box office, it received mixed reviews from critics, who noted that while Crawford seemed nervous at making the transition to sound, she had become one of the most popular actresses in the world. Montana Moon (1930), an uneasy mix of Western clichés and music, teamed her with John Mack Brown and Ricardo Cortez. Although the film had problems with censors, it was a major success at the time of its release. Our Blushing Brides (1930), the final installment in the Our Dancing Daughters franchise co-starring Robert Montgomery and Anita Page, where Crawford "carries the burden of dramatics in this photoplay and comes off splendidly and intelligently".

Her next movie, Paid (1930), paired her with Robert Armstrong, and was another success. During the early sound era, MGM began to place Crawford in more sophisticated roles, rather than continuing to promote her flapper-inspired persona of the silent era. In 1931, MGM cast Crawford in five films. Three of them teamed her opposite Clark Gable, the studio's soon-to-be biggest male star and "King of Hollywood". Dance, Fools, Dance, released in February 1931, was the first pairing of Crawford and Gable. Their second movie together, Laughing Sinners, released in May 1931, was directed by Harry Beaumont and also co-starred Neil Hamilton. Possessed, their third film together, released in October, was directed by Clarence Brown. These films were immensely popular with audiences and were generally well received by critics, establishing Crawford's position as one of MGM's top female stars of the decade along with Norma Shearer, Greta Garbo and Jean Harlow. Her only other notable film of 1931, This Modern Age, was released in August and despite unfavorable reviews was a moderate success.

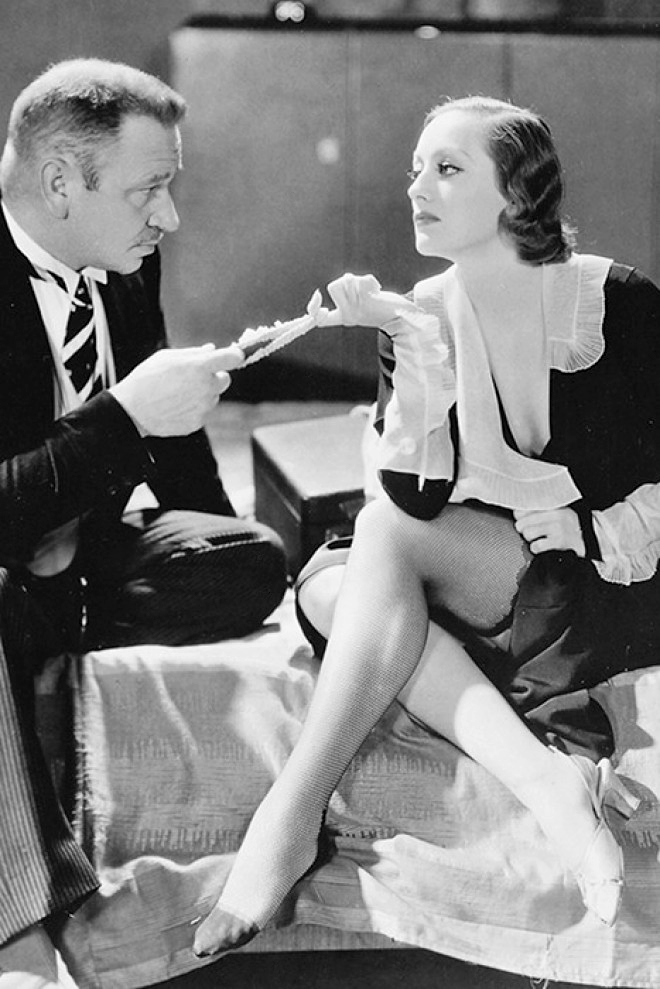
Crawford in a publicity still with Beery for Grand Hotel (1932)

MGM next cast her in the film Grand Hotel, directed by Edmund Goulding. As the studio's first all-star production, Crawford co-starred opposite Greta Garbo, John and Lionel Barrymore, and Wallace Beery, among others. Receiving third billing, she played the middle-class stenographer to Beery's controlling general director. Crawford later admitted to being nervous during the filming of the movie because she was working with accomplished actors, and that she was disappointed that she had no scenes with one she had admired, the "divine Garbo". Grand Hotel was released in April 1932 to critical and commercial success. It was one of the highest-grossing movies of the year, and won the Academy Award for Best Picture.

Crawford achieved continued success in Letty Lynton (1932). Soon after this movie's release, a plagiarism suit forced MGM to withdraw it; it is therefore considered the "lost" Crawford film. Designed by Adrian, the gown with large ruffled sleeves which Crawford wore in the movie became a popular style that same year, and was even copied by Macy's. On loan to United Artists, she played prostitute Sadie Thompson in Rain (1932), a film version of John Colton's 1923 play. Actress Jeanne Eagels played the role on stage, and Gloria Swanson had originated the part on screen in the 1928 film version. Crawford's performance was panned, and the film was not a success. Despite the failure of Rain, in 1932, the publishing of the first "Top Ten Money-Making Stars Poll" placed Crawford third in popularity at the box office, behind only Marie Dressler and Janet Gaynor. She remained on the list for the next several years, last appearing on it in 1936.

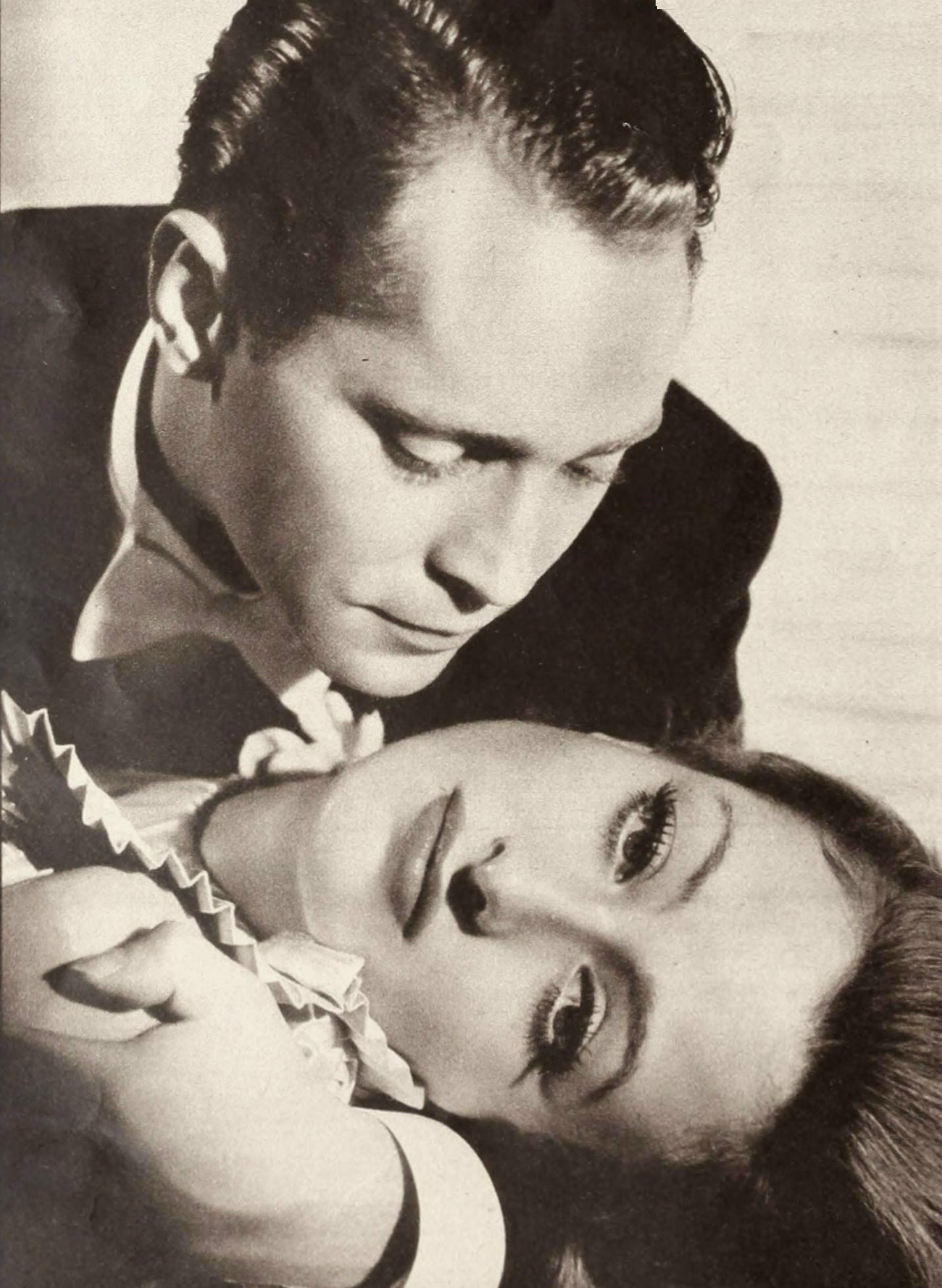
Franchot Tone and Crawford in Dancing Lady

She was again teamed with Clark Gable, along with Franchot Tone and Fred Astaire, in the hit Dancing Lady (1933), in which she received top billing. She next played the title role in Sadie McKee (1934), opposite Tone and Gene Raymond. She was paired with Gable for the fifth time in Chained, and for the sixth time in Forsaking All Others (both 1934). Crawford's films of this era were some of the most-popular and highest-grossing films of the mid-1930s.

Crawford continued her reign as a popular movie actress well into the mid-1930s. No More Ladies (1935) co-starred Robert Montgomery and then-husband Franchot Tone, and was a success. Crawford had long pleaded with MGM's head Louis B. Mayer to cast her in more dramatic roles, and although he was reluctant, he cast her in the sophisticated comedy-drama I Live My Life (1935), directed by W. S. Van Dyke, and it was well received by critics.

She next starred in The Gorgeous Hussy (1936), opposite Robert Taylor and Lionel Barrymore, as well as Tone. It was a critical and box-office success, and became one of Crawford's biggest hits of the decade. Love on the Run (1936), a romantic comedy directed by W. S. Van Dyke, was her seventh film co-starring Clark Gable.

=== 1937–1943: Career decline at MGM ===
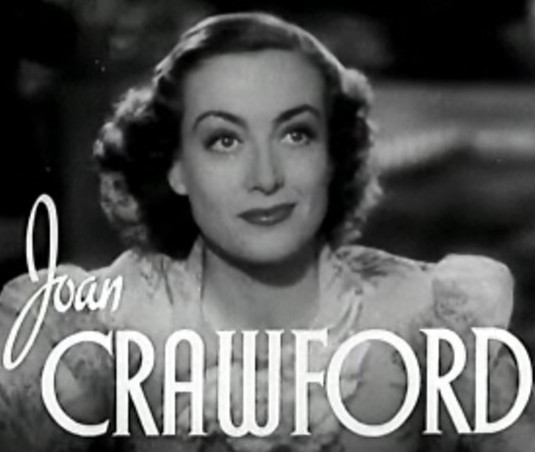
Crawford as Fay Cheyney in The Last of Mrs. Cheyney (1937)

Even though Crawford remained a respected MGM actress, and her films still earned profits, her popularity declined in the late 1930s. In 1937, Crawford was proclaimed the first "Queen of the Movies" by Life magazine. She unexpectedly slipped from seventh to sixteenth place at the box office that year, and her public popularity also began to wane. Richard Boleslawski's comedy-drama The Last of Mrs. Cheyney (1937) teamed her opposite William Powell in their sole screen pairing. The film was also Crawford's last box-office success before the onset of her "box office poison" period.

She co-starred opposite Franchot Tone for the seventh—and final—time in The Bride Wore Red (1937). Mannequin, co-starring Spencer Tracy, also released in 1937 did, as the New York Times stated, "restore Crawford to her throne as queen of the working girls". On May 3, 1938, Crawford—along with Greta Garbo, Mae West, Edward Arnold, Marlene Dietrich, Katharine Hepburn, and Kay Francis—was dubbed "Box Office Poison" in an advertisement in the Hollywood Reporter. The list was submitted by Harry Brandt, president of the Independent Theatre Owners Association of America. Brandt stated that while these stars had "unquestioned" dramatic abilities, their high salaries did not reflect in their ticket sales, thus hurting the movie exhibitors involved. (Later, an article in the Independent Film Journal, stated that some of the other stars considered Box Office Poison included Norma Shearer, Dolores del Rio, Fred Astaire, John Barrymore and Luise Rainer). Crawford's follow-up movie, Frank Borzage's The Shining Hour (1938), also starring Margaret Sullavan and Melvyn Douglas, was well received by critics, but it was a box-office flop.

She made a comeback in 1939 with her role as home-wrecker Crystal Allen in The Women, opposite her professional nemesis, Norma Shearer. A year later, she played against type in the unglamorous role of Julie in Strange Cargo (1940), her eighth—and final—film with Clark Gable. She later starred as a facially disfigured blackmailer in A Woman's Face (1941), a remake of the Swedish film En kvinnas ansikte which had starred Ingrid Bergman in the lead role three years earlier. While the film was only a moderate box office success, Crawford's performance was hailed by many critics.

After 18 years, Crawford requested to be released from her contract with MGM, which was terminated by mutual consent on June 29, 1943. In lieu of the last film remaining under her contract, MGM bought her out for $100,000.

=== 1943–1952: Move to Warner Bros. ===
For $500,000, Crawford signed with Warner Bros. for a three-movie deal, and was placed on the payroll on July 1, 1943. Her first film for the studio was Hollywood Canteen (1944), an all-star morale-booster film that teamed her with several other top movie stars at the time.

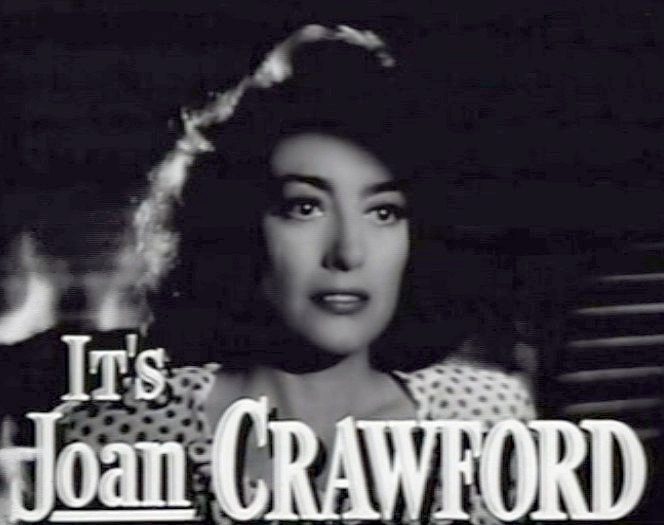
Mildred Pierce trailer (1945)

She wanted to play the title role in Mildred Pierce (1945), but director Michael Curtiz instead lobbied for the casting of Barbara Stanwyck. Curtiz demanded Crawford prove her suitability by taking a screen test; she agreed and ultimately received the role. Mildred Pierce was a resounding critical and commercial success. It epitomized the lush visual style and the hard-boiled film noir sensibility that defined Warner Bros. movies of the late forties. Crawford earned the Academy Award for Best Actress in a Leading Role.

The success of Mildred Pierce revived Crawford's film career. Her next film was Humoresque (1946), co-starring John Garfield. She starred alongside Van Heflin in Possessed (1947), for which she received a second Academy Award nomination for "Best Actress". In Daisy Kenyon (1947) she appeared opposite Dana Andrews and Henry Fonda, and in Flamingo Road (1949) her character has an ultimately deadly feud with a corrupt southern sheriff played by Sydney Greenstreet. She made a cameo in It's a Great Feeling (1949), poking fun at her own screen image. In 1950, she starred in the film noir The Damned Don't Cry and in the melodrama Harriet Craig.

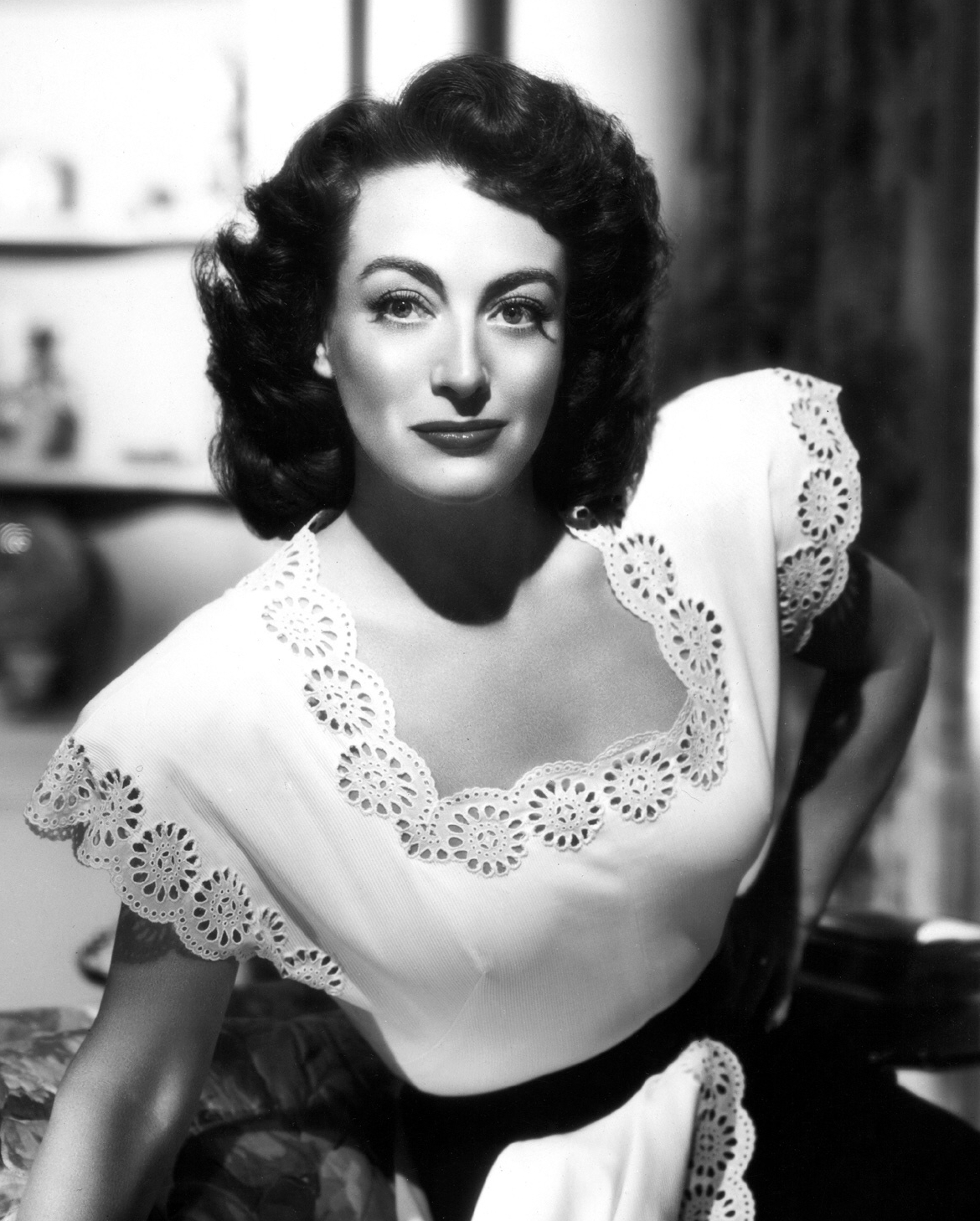
Crawford in Humoresque, 1946

After the completion of This Woman Is Dangerous (1952), she asked to be released from her Warner Bros. contract. Later in that year, she received her third Academy Award nomination for "Best Actress" in Sudden Fear for RKO Radio Pictures.

=== Radio and television ===
Crawford worked in the radio series The Screen Guild Theater on January 8, 1939; Good News; Baby, broadcast on March 2, 1940, on Arch Oboler's Lights Out; The Word on Everyman's Theater (1941); Chained on the Lux Radio Theater, and Norman Corwin's Document A/777 (1948). She appeared in episodes of anthology television series in the 1950s, and, in 1959, made a pilot for The Joan Crawford Show.

=== 1952–1972: Later career ===
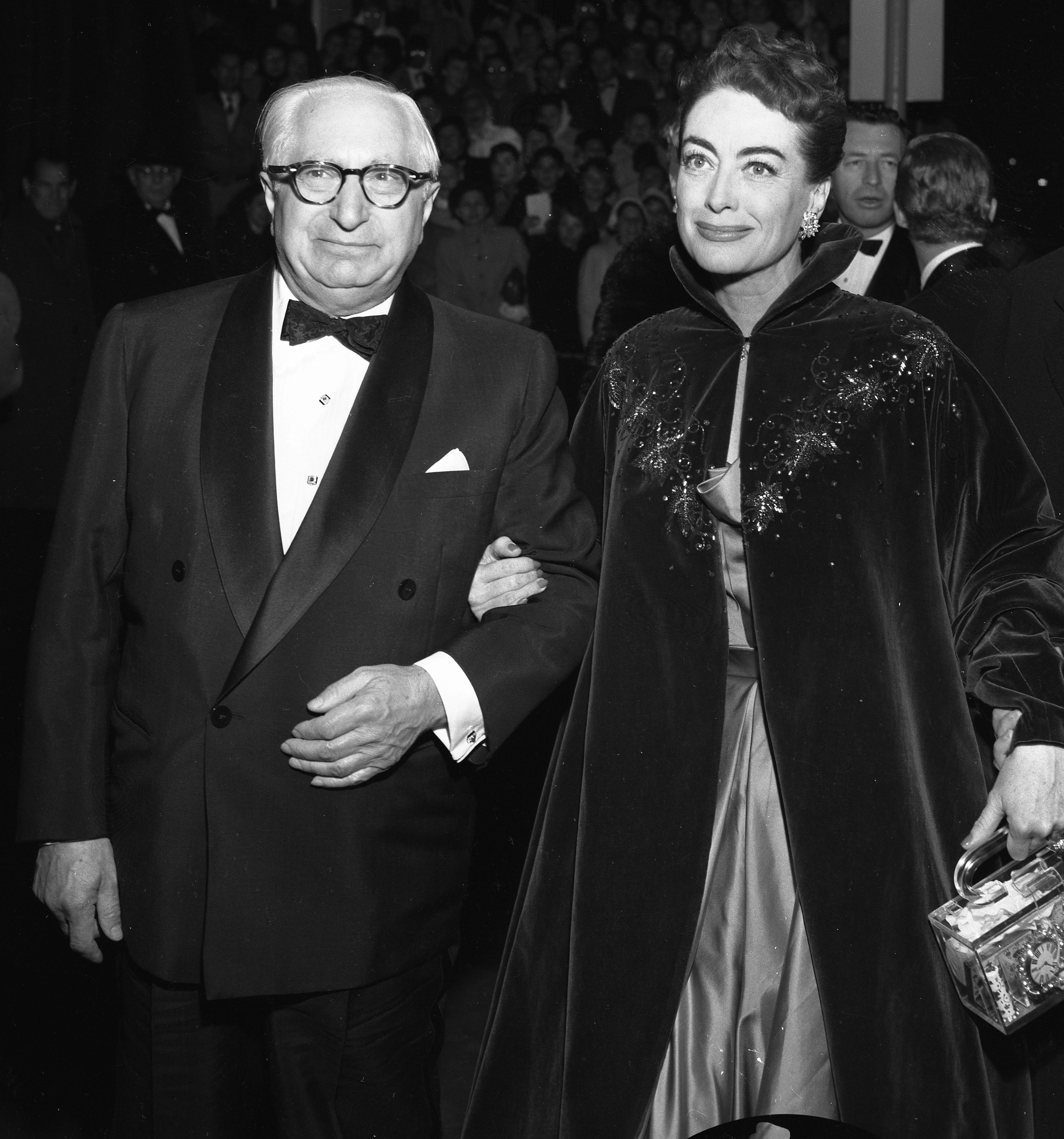
In 1953 with Louis B. Mayer at the premiere of Torch Song. "To me, L.B. Mayer was my father, my father confessor, the best friend I ever had", Crawford was quoted as saying.

After her Academy Award-nominated performance in 1952's Sudden Fear, Crawford continued to work steadily throughout the rest of the decade. After a 10-year absence from MGM, she returned to that studio to star in Torch Song (1953), a musical drama centering on the life of a demanding stage star who falls in love with a blind pianist, played by Michael Wilding.

In 1954, she starred in Johnny Guitar, a cult classic directed by Nicholas Ray, co-starring Sterling Hayden and Mercedes McCambridge. She also starred in Female on the Beach with Jeff Chandler, and in Queen Bee (both 1955), alongside John Ireland. The following year, she starred opposite a young Cliff Robertson in Autumn Leaves (1956), and filmed a leading role in The Story of Esther Costello (1957), co-starring Rossano Brazzi.

Crawford, who had been left near-penniless following Alfred Steele's death, accepted a small role in The Best of Everything (1959). Although she was not the star of the film, she received positive reviews. By 1961, Joan Crawford was once again her own publicity machine, with a new script, Whatever Happened to Baby Jane?, sent by Robert Aldrich.

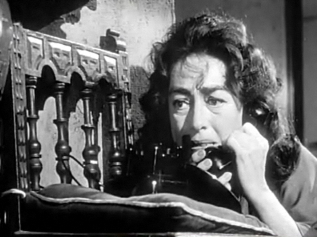
Crawford as Blanche Hudson

Crawford starred as Blanche Hudson, an elderly, disabled former A-list movie star who lives in fear of her psychotic sister Jane, in the highly successful psychological thriller What Ever Happened to Baby Jane? (1962). Despite the actresses' earlier tensions, Crawford reportedly suggested Bette Davis for the role of Jane. The two stars maintained publicly that there was no feud between them.

The film was a huge success, recouping its costs within eleven days of its nationwide release and reviving Crawford's career. Davis was nominated for an Academy Award for her performance as Jane Hudson. In 1964, Crawford starred as Lucy Harbin in William Castle's horror mystery Strait-Jacket (1964). During the same year, Aldrich reteamed Crawford and Davis in Hush...Hush, Sweet Charlotte (1964). After a purported campaign of harassment by Davis on location in Louisiana, Crawford returned to Hollywood and entered a hospital. After a prolonged absence, Aldrich was forced to replace her with Olivia de Havilland. Crawford, who was devastated, said "I heard the news of my replacement over the radio, lying in my hospital bed ... I cried for nine hours." Despite being replaced, brief footage of Crawford made it into the film when she is seen sitting in a taxi in a wide shot.

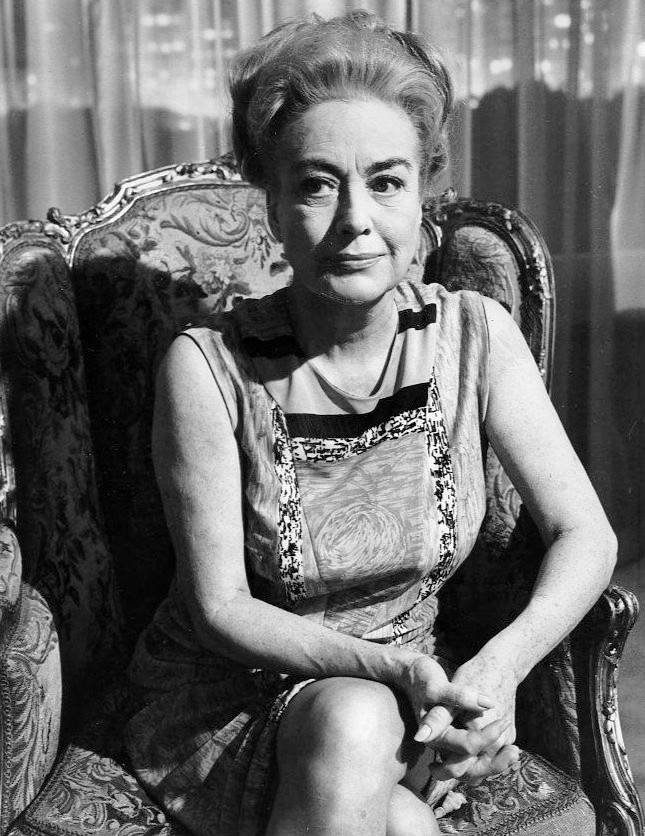
Night Gallery episode (1969)

In 1965, she played Amy Nelson in I Saw What You Did, another William Castle vehicle. She starred as circus owner Monica Rivers in Herman Cohen's thriller Berserk! (1967). After that film's release, Crawford guest-starred as herself in The Lucy Show. The episode, "Lucy and the Lost Star", first aired on February 26, 1968. Crawford allegedly struggled during rehearsals; however, she was letter-perfect on the day of the show, which included dancing the Charleston, and received two standing ovations from the studio audience.

In October 1968, Crawford's 29-year-old daughter, Christina (who was then acting in New York in the soap opera The Secret Storm), needed immediate medical attention for a ruptured ovarian tumor. Despite the fact that Christina's character was a 28-year-old, Crawford played the role for one week.

Crawford's appearance in the 1969 television film Night Gallery (which served as pilot to the series that followed) was the first occasion when Steven Spielberg directed a professional actor. Crawford made a cameo appearance as herself in the first episode of The Tim Conway Show, which aired on January 30, 1970. She starred on the big screen one final time, playing Dr. Brockton in Herman Cohen's science-fiction horror film Trog (1970), rounding out a career spanning 45 years and more than 80 motion pictures. Crawford made three more television appearances, including one as Stephanie White in a 1970 episode ("The Nightmare") of The Virginian, and as Joan Fairchild (her final dramatic performance) in a 1972 episode ("Dear Joan: We're Going to Scare You to Death") of The Sixth Sense.

== Personal life ==
=== Marriages ===
On June 3, 1929, Crawford eloped with Douglas Fairbanks, Jr. at Saint Malachy's Roman Catholic Church (known as "The Actors' Chapel", owing to its proximity to Broadway theatres) in Manhattan, although neither was Catholic. Fairbanks was the son of Douglas Fairbanks and the stepson of Mary Pickford, who were considered Hollywood royalty. Fairbanks Sr. and Pickford were opposed to the sudden marriage, and did not invite the couple to their home at Pickfair for eight months after the marriage.

The relationship between Crawford and Fairbanks, Sr., eventually warmed; she called him "Uncle Doug", and he called her "Billie", her childhood nickname, but one that close friends used throughout her life. Following that first invitation, Crawford and Fairbanks, Jr., became more frequent guests. While the Fairbanks men played golf together, Crawford was either left with Pickford, who would retire to her quarters, or simply left alone.

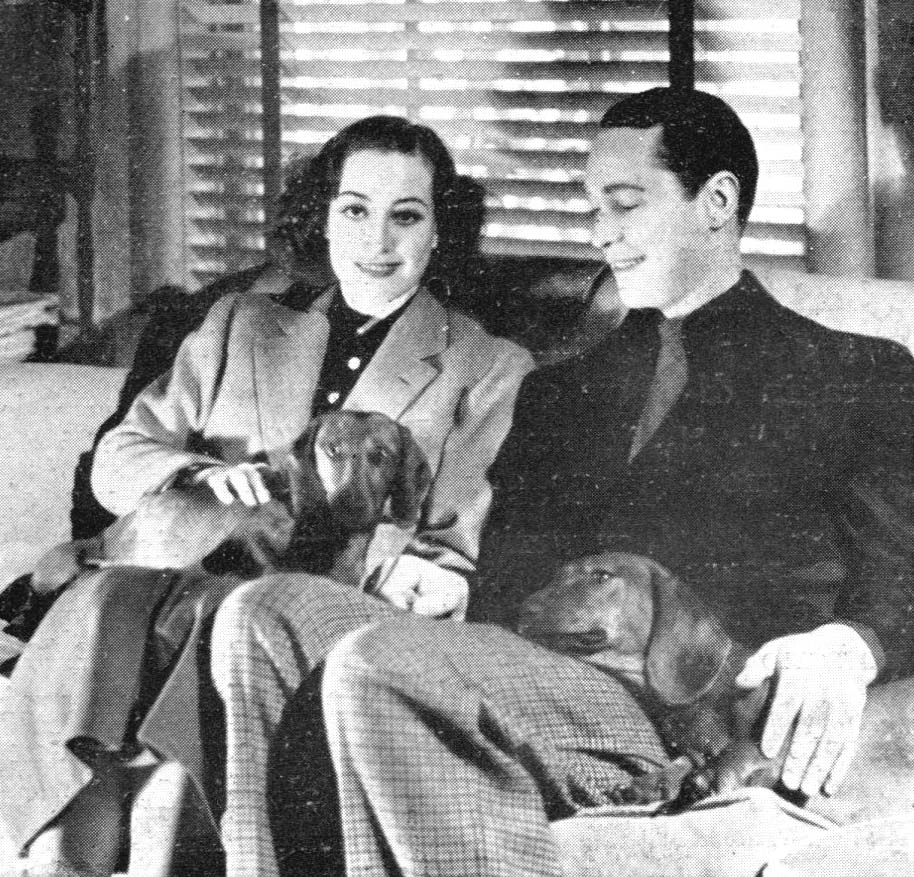
Crawford with second husband, actor Franchot Tone, 1936

In May 1933, Crawford divorced Fairbanks, citing "grievous mental cruelty". Crawford claimed Fairbanks had "a jealous and suspicious attitude" toward her friends, and that they had "loud arguments about the most trivial subjects" lasting "far into the night".

In 1935, Crawford married Franchot Tone, a stage actor from New York who planned to use his film earnings to finance his theatre group. The couple built a small theatre at Crawford's Brentwood home, and put on productions of classic plays for select groups of friends who lived in the popular Brentwood area like Clark Gable and Charley Chase. Tone and Crawford had first appeared together in Today We Live (1933), but Crawford was hesitant about entering into another romance so soon after her split from Fairbanks.

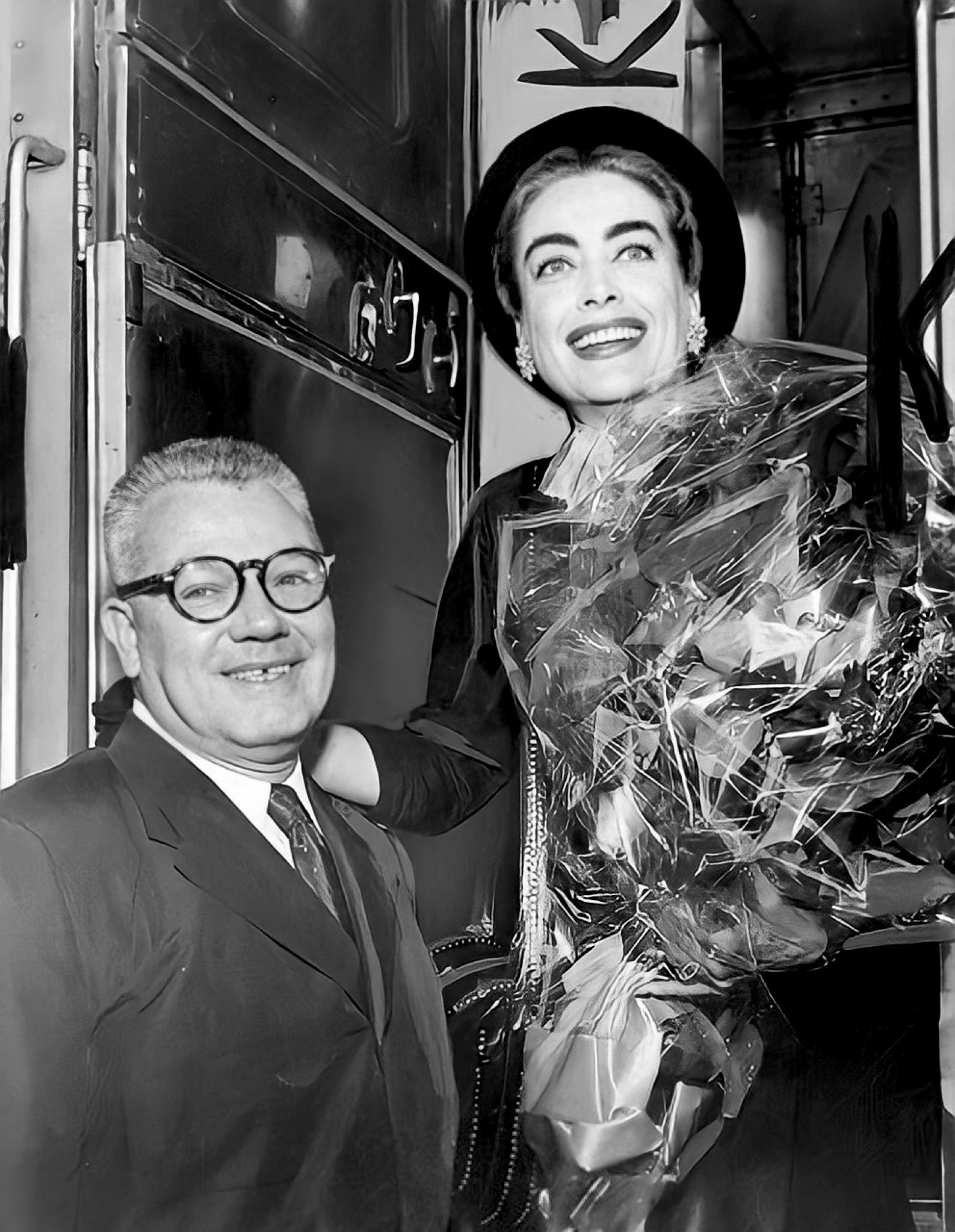
Newlyweds Crawford and Steele in 1955

Before and during their marriage, Crawford worked to promote Tone's Hollywood career, but he was not interested in being a star, ultimately wanting to just be an actor, and Crawford wearied of the effort. During their marriage they tried on two separate occasions for children, both ending in miscarriage. Tone allegedly began drinking and became physically abusive. She filed for divorce, which was granted in 1939. Crawford and Tone later rekindled their friendship, and Tone even proposed in 1964 that they remarry. When he died in 1968, Crawford arranged for him to be cremated and his ashes scattered at Muskoka Lakes, Canada.

Crawford met actor Phillip Terry in June 1942 after press agent Harry Mines asked if he could bring Terry along for dinner at Crawford's home. On July 21, 1942, the couple married 10 minutes after midnight at the home of Crawford's lawyer, Neil McCarthy, by Judge Flynn, six weeks after their first date in San Fernando Valley. On December 16, 1945, Crawford and Terry separated. Later, on March 12, 1946, Crawford filed for divorce on "grounds of cruelty". On April 25, they divorced.

Crawford married her fourth—and final—husband, Alfred Steele, at the Flamingo Hotel in Las Vegas on May 10, 1955. They had met at a party in 1954. By that time, Steele had become president of Pepsi-Cola. He later was named chairman of the board of Pepsi-Cola. They remained married until his death in May 1959.

=== Children ===
Crawford adopted her first child, a daughter, in June 1940. Because she was single, California law prevented her from adopting within the state, so she arranged the adoption through an agency in Las Vegas. The child was temporarily called Joan, until Crawford changed her name to Christina. Christina's birth mother was a 19-year-old unmarried girl who had moved to Los Angeles with her family. Christina's birth mother contracted with a baby broker for Crawford to adopt her baby after its birth.

While married to Phillip Terry, the couple adopted a son (born Marcus Gary Kullberg on June 3, 1941, prior to changing his name to David Gary Deatherage) whom they named Christopher. His mother, Rebecca, had been a married woman who had become pregnant after having an affair with a neighbor. Ten days after the child's birth, Crawford picked him up, but when Rebecca learned the child had been adopted by a celebrity, she attempted to blackmail Crawford for money, which resulted in Crawford giving the child back to her. After his return, Rebecca's husband was physically and emotionally abusive, refusing to let Christopher in his sight (his mother would have to hide him in closets). After he threw an infant Christopher against a wall, rupturing his hernia, Rebecca placed him back up for adoption, and he was adopted by a loving family. However, losing him devastated Crawford, and none of her other children dared mention him, as it was a tender subject for her.

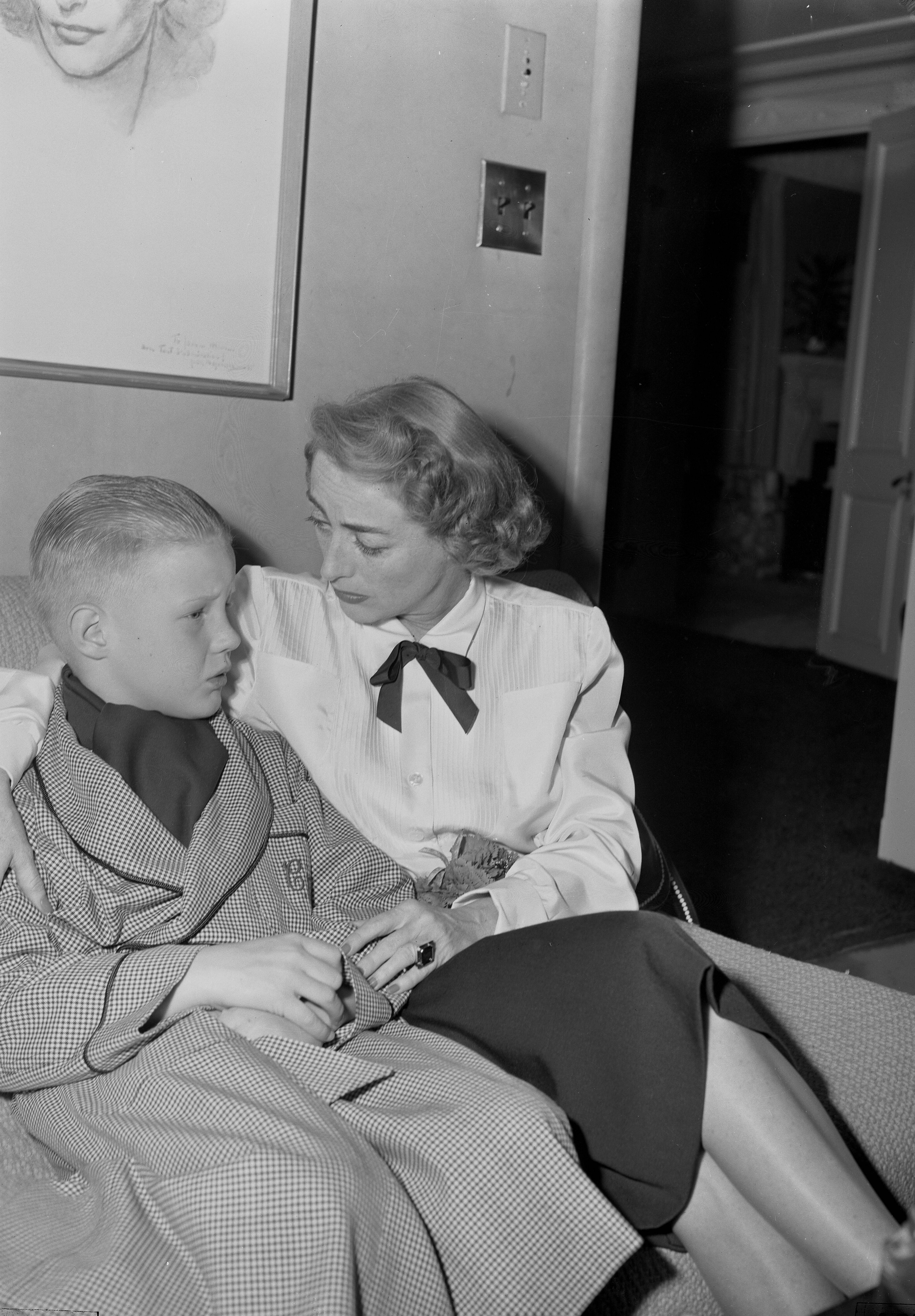
Crawford and son Christopher, 1951

In 1942, Crawford and Terry adopted another boy, whom they named Phillip Terry Jr. After the marriage ended in 1946, Crawford changed that child's name to Christopher Crawford. In 1944, when Rebecca learned of the child (who was unrelated to her son), she claimed he was also her child, leading to her arrest and her being placed in a psychiatric hospital. Rebecca's son Christopher changed his name to David Gary Deatherage and wrote a memoir of his childhood titled The Other Side of My Life, which released in 2006. He lamented not being able to meet her personally, and Crawford's twin daughters told him about how Crawford felt about losing him. Christopher Crawford, not Rebecca's son, often ran away from home. He was expelled from several schools and went to a military academy for his high school days. At 18, Christopher married; by the time he was 19, he and his wife had a daughter named Janet. In 1961, he took them to meet Crawford in Miami, Florida. He told the Los Angeles Times in 1978, "J.C. [Crawford] was staying at the Fontainebleau. My daughter was six weeks old and I thought J.C. would like to see her granddaughter. She held Janet for about 10 seconds, I think. I said, 'Janet, that's your grandmother; she's a very famous lady.’ J.C. said, ‘I'm nobody's grandmother. I'm Aunt Joan.’ Then she handed her back to me and said, 'She doesn't look anything like you!'" He never saw Crawford in person again after this meeting. His second daughter, Bonnie, was born around 1973. In the same interview, he recalled, "When Bonnie was born, she had a lot of trouble. She was just a tiny little mass of bones with some skin stretched over them. So I called J.C. and said, 'I need your help. Your granddaughter needs blood and she needs it now. She might die.’ J.C. said, 'She's not my granddaughter. You were adopted.’ I lost my temper and slammed down the phone so hard I broke the receiver. That was it between J.C. and me." As of 1978, Christopher had remarried and had another daughter, Chrystal. "She was not a family," he said of Crawford. "I honestly to this day do not believe that she ever cared for me." Christopher died in 2006.

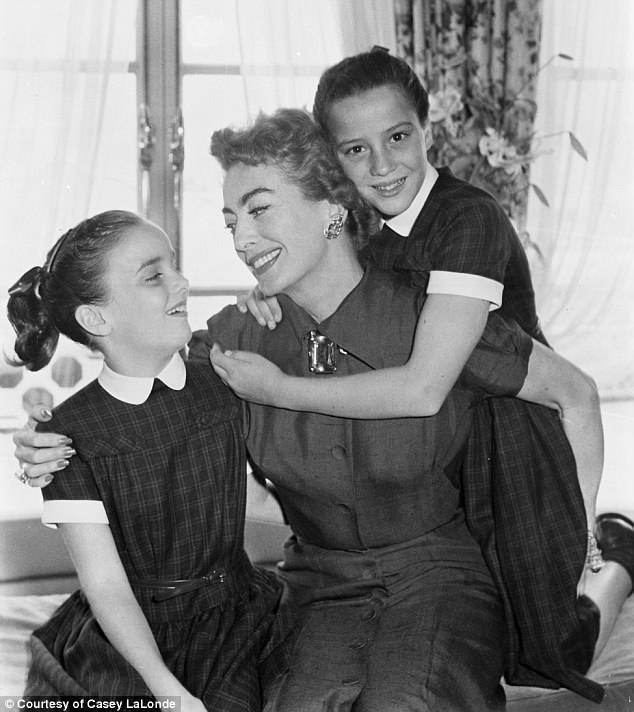
Crawford with twins Cathy and Cynthia

In 1947, Crawford adopted two fraternal twin daughters and named them Catherine "Cathy" and Cynthia "Cindy". They were born prematurely on January 13, 1947, and required hospital supervision for several weeks. Cathy and Cynthia are the only children adopted by Crawford from the Tennessee Children's Home Society. Their birth mother was ill and died less than a week after the twins were born due to kidney failure; their biological father abandoned their mother during birth. Their biological mother made the adoption arrangements before Cathy and Cindy were born.

Crawford's fourth husband, Alfred Steele, took on a father-figure role to the children after his marriage to Crawford in 1955.

Cathy described her mother as wise, warm, realistic, caring, and a "good friend". Cathy attended Vernon Court Junior College, the Fashion Institute of Technology, and the International Fine Arts College. In November 1967, Crawford announced that Cathy was engaged to Navy petty officer Jerome Jon Lalonde. They met while Cathy was working part time as a waitress while attending college. They were married in Alexandria Bay on August 10, 1968. Herbert L. Barnet, then CEO of Pepsi Cola, gave Cathy away at the wedding. Cathy designed and sewed her own wedding dress. They had two children together. The couple separated in 1984, later divorcing. Cynthia married John Jordan and also had two children. They would eventually divorce.

In the 1990s, the twins reconnected with their biological family in Tennessee. Cynthia died on October 14, 2007. Cathy died on January 11, 2020, of lung cancer.

=== Pepsi-Cola ===
During her marriage to Alfred Steele, Crawford traveled extensively on behalf of Pepsi. Following Steele's death on April 19, 1959, Crawford was elected as the first female to the board of directors and later took on the role of goodwill ambassador. In 1966, Crawford estimated that she traveled over 100,000 miles (160,000 km) a year for the company.

In 1963, Crawford received Pepsi's sixth annual "Pally Award", which was in the shape of a bronze Pepsi bottle. It was awarded to the employee making the most significant contribution to company sales. In 1973, Crawford retired from Pepsi's board of directors upon her official age of 65.

== Later life ==
On February 2, 1970, Crawford was presented with the Cecil B. DeMille Award by John Wayne at the Golden Globes, held at the Coconut Grove at The Ambassador Hotel in Los Angeles. In 1970, she also spoke at Stephens College in Columbia, Missouri, where she had been a student for two months in 1922.

Crawford published her autobiography, A Portrait of Joan, co-written with Jane Kesner Ardmore, in 1962 through Doubleday. Crawford's next book, My Way of Life, was published in 1971 by Simon & Schuster.

Crawford appeared as the fourth legend in John Springer's "Legendary Ladies" series at the Town Hall in Manhattan on April 8, 1973. The event was sold out, with the 1,500 seat venue filled to capacity. The audience watched a series of highlight scenes from Crawford's screen career. Afterward, Crawford came on stage for a question-and-answer session with the audience. Upon Crawford's departure, approximately 200 fans surrounded her limousine and would not let it move for several minutes.

In September 1973, Crawford moved from apartment 22-G to a smaller apartment next door, 22-H, at Imperial House, 150 East 69th Street, New York City. Her last public appearance was made on September 23, 1974, at a book party she hosted for her old friend Rosalind Russell at New York's Rainbow Room. Reportedly, after a series of unflattering photographs were published of Crawford leaving the party, she retreated into seclusion.

== Death ==
Crawford had a heart attack on May 10, 1977, and died in her apartment in Lenox Hill, New York City. Her age was reported as 69. Four days earlier on May 6, 1977, Crawford had given away her Shih Tzu, Princess Lotus Blossom, because she was too weak to continue to care for her.

Joan Crawford's grave at Ferncliff Cemetery and Mausoleum in New York

A funeral was held at Campbell Funeral Home, New York, on May 13, 1977, and her cremated ashes were placed in a crypt at Ferncliff Cemetery and Mausoleum, Hartsdale, Westchester County, New York, next to her fourth and last husband Alfred Steele.

Disposing of her $2 million estate in her will, which had been signed on October 28, 1976, Crawford bequeathed $77,500 to each of her two youngest children, Cindy and Cathy, and $35,000 to her longtime friend and secretary Betty Barker, and smaller bequests to a few other people. Crawford also left money to her favorite charities: the United Service Organizations New York centre, the Motion Picture & Television Country House and Hospital, the American Cancer Society, the Muscular Dystrophy Association, the American Heart Association, and the Wiltwyck School for Boys.

She disinherited her two eldest children, Christina and Christopher, stating in her will: "It is my intention to make no provision herein for my son, Christopher, or my daughter, Christina, for reasons which are well known to them." Both of them challenged the will and received a $55,000 settlement. She also bequeathed nothing to her niece, Joan Lowe (1933–1999; born Joan Crawford LeSueur, the only child of her estranged brother, Hal).

A memorial service was held for Crawford at All Souls' Unitarian Church on Lexington Avenue in New York on May 17, 1977. In attendance were long-time friend Myrna Loy and co-stars Geraldine Brooks and Cliff Robertson, who gave eulogies; Pearl Bailey sang "He'll Understand". Another memorial service, organized by George Cukor, was held on June 24 in the Samuel Goldwyn Theater at the Academy of Motion Picture Arts and Sciences in Beverly Hills, California.

== Legacy ==
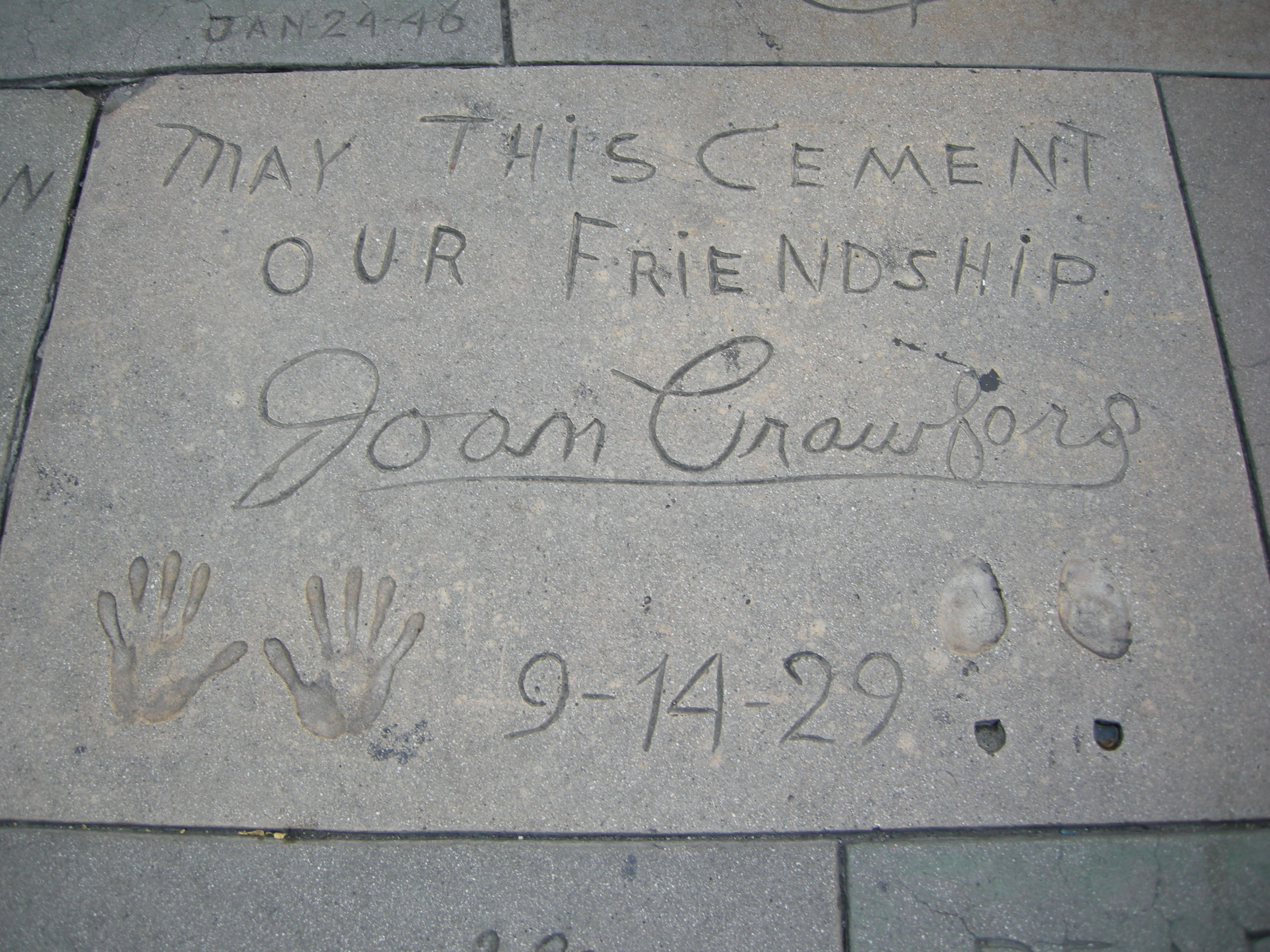
On September 14, 1929, Crawford was honored with a block in the forecourt of Grauman's Chinese Theatre.

Joan Crawford's handprints and footprints were imprinted in a block in the forecourt of Grauman's Chinese Theatre in Hollywood on September 14, 1929.

She has a star on the Hollywood Walk of Fame, at 1752 Vine Street, for her contributions to the motion picture industry.

In 1999, Crawford was voted the tenth-greatest female star of the classic American cinema by the American Film Institute.

Playboy listed Crawford as number 84 of the "100 Sexiest Women of the 20th century".

Crawford has also attracted a following in the gay community. In Joan Crawford: The Essential Biography, the author wrote that Crawford appealed to many gay men because they sympathized with her struggle for success in both the entertainment industry and her personal life.

== Charity contributions ==
Throughout her life, Crawford was heavily involved in charity work, as well as contributing to various efforts for service members. In the 1930s, she was named one of the vice presidents on the board of the Motion Picture Relief Fund. Throughout that decade she supported the cause by promoting, donating, attending board meetings, and collecting contributions "from actors and directors who were remiss". In 1938, Crawford, Adolphe Menjou, and Jackie Cooper were on the organization's stamp committee, whose goal was to raise money from used stamps. The sales from the stamps to collectors were to benefit actors in need of aid. Crawford donated all her stamped envelopes from fan letters to the cause that year. In 1933, Crawford donated her large doll collection, which she had been collecting since the 1920s, to a children's hospital.

During World War II, Crawford did much to help in the war effort which included promoting the sale of war bonds to the public. In 1942, she began volunteering at the Hollywood Canteen in Los Angeles to entertain and serve service members. In 1943, she began volunteering for American Women's Voluntary Services nurseries as a member by giving of her time and money to provide support service to the children of service members. During WWII, Crawford volunteered as the guarantor for English actor and writer, Margaret Chute. Chute required a guarantor to move from England to the United States during war.

In 1942, Crawford donated her entire $112,500 salary from They All Kissed the Bride to charities in memory of Carole Lombard. They included the American Red Cross ($50,000) which helped in recovery efforts following Lombard's death, the Infantile Paralysis Drive ($25,000), Motion Picture Relief ($25,000), and the Navy Relief Fund ($12,500).

In June 1952, Crawford travelled to Fort Worth and Dallas, Texas, for charity and helped raise thousands of dollars, shook hands, and met with 575 people in one night. In 1955, she donated some of her clothes for auction to support the Boys Republic, a rehabilitation centre for teenagers. Crawford was also named Chairman of the "1959 National Multiple Sclerosis Society Fund campaign", renamed the "Alfred N. Steele Memorial Campaign for the MS Hope Chest" following Steele's death in May 1959.

In the 1960s, Crawford sponsored the Philadelphia Cotillion Society's annual Christmas Cotillion, aimed at raising funds for Heritage House and the NAACP.

In 1965, the U.S.O. named Crawford the "Woman of The Year" for her ongoing contributions to the organization and the support of American service members. Crawford continued her commitment to service members into the 1960s, by visiting army hospitals to cheer up soldiers who were injured in the Vietnam War.

Aside from volunteering to war efforts and service members, Crawford also volunteered for a great number of charity organizations, which included the American Red Cross, C.A.R.E., various charities for the advancement of care and cures for crippled children and the American Cancer Society, for which Crawford served as national chairwoman in 1972. From 1966 until 1973, Crawford appeared on the annual muscular dystrophy telethon to encourage the public to pledge funds to help those affected by the illness.

Crawford was elected as ball chairman of the 16th annual Animal Kingdom Ball on January 20, 1965, to celebrate the 100th anniversary of the American Society for the Prevention of Cruelty to Animals. On March 25, 1971, Crawford accepted a position as honorary chairmanship of the board of advisers to help raise funds for the Negro Ensemble Company. Crawford also sent out the invitations for Alan King's first charity benefit in support of children with mental disabilities.

Following her death, it was revealed that for many years Crawford had paid for hospital rooms and specialists for hundreds of indigent people who could not afford medical care—many of whom were members of the film industry who were down on their luck and destitute. Crawford never publicized these contributions, and did not want the public (or the patients) to know she was paying their medical bills.

== Mommie Dearest ==
On October 2, 1978, Christina Crawford published a memoir titled Mommie Dearest, alleging her late adoptive mother was emotionally and physically abusive. In 1981, the book was made into the film Mommie Dearest, starring Faye Dunaway.

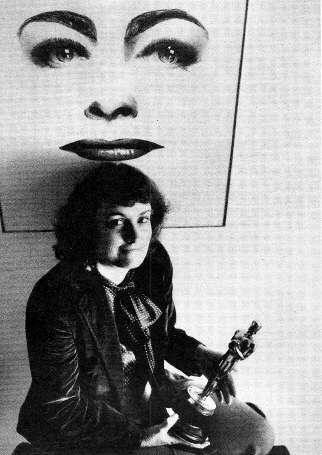
Crawford's daughter Cathy in 1981

Crawford's two other twin daughters, Cathy Crawford Lalonde and Cynthia Crawford Jordan, denounced the book, categorically denying any abuse. One of them told reporters in 1979, "I can't understand how people believe this stupid stuff Tina has written." Cathy claimed in 1981 both the book and movie were "untrue".

On May 28, 1981, Cathy appeared on Good Morning America, claiming their mother was "warm" and Christina's book was a "great work of fiction".

On July 20, 1998, Cathy filed a lawsuit against Christina for "defamation of character". Cathy stated in her lawsuit that during the 20th-anniversary book tour of Mommie Dearest, Christina publicly claimed to interviewers that LaLonde and her twin sister, Cynthia, were not biological sisters, and that their adoption was never legal. LaLonde stated neither claim by Christina was true and attached copies of the twin girls' birth certificates and adoption documentation to the lawsuit. The lawsuit was later settled out of court for $5,000 plus court costs. Later in 2008, Cathy told biographer Charlotte Chandler in 2008, "I don't know where [Christina] got her ideas. Our Mommie was the best mother anyone ever had."

Helen Hayes, June Allyson, and Vincent Sherman stated they had witnessed strict discipline. For example, Hayes and Sherman both stated in their autobiographies that they felt Joan was too strict a parent. Allyson stated in her autobiography that she witnessed Joan put Christina in "time-out", and did not let her go to a friend's birthday party as a punishment. However, these people never stated they witnessed any outright abuse. James MacArthur stated he spent a weekend with the Crawford family when he was a child and never saw any abuse, but did observe that Christopher was harnessed in his bed at night. Unbeknownst to MacArthur, according to Christopher's daughter, Janet, Christopher was diagnosed with attention deficit hyperactivity disorder, and Joan's family doctor recommended the store-bought child harness to keep Christopher in bed at night and prevent him from wandering outside to play and possibly fall into the swimming pool. Christopher's daughter stated to columnist Cindy Adams, "I have two boys, one is identical to my brother and my father. We're treating his hyperactivity with medication, but three generations have had this condition. It must come from something. Joan said she didn't believe in heredity, but my dad proves her wrong. He, my brother, and my son all look alike and act alike."

Many of Crawford's friends and co-workers, including Van Johnson, Ann Blyth, Katharine Hepburn, Cesar Romero, Gary Gray, and Douglas Fairbanks Jr. (Crawford's first husband), denied the claims. In her 1987 autobiography, Myrna Loy stated, "She [Christina] wanted to be Joan Crawford. I think that's the basis of the book she wrote afterward and everything else. I saw what Christina's mind created, the fantasy world she lived in."

Christina's husband, producer Harvey Medlinsky, said in response to Christina's memoir, "I have only good things to say about Joan Crawford. She was always nice to me and Christina." The Secret Storm producer Gloria Monty, countered Christina's allegation that Joan "stole" Christina's role in the television show when she fell ill in 1968. According to Monty, Christina lied regarding this situation. Monty stated that she and CBS asked Joan to substitute for her daughter on the show, and that Joan agreed only in the interest of not allowing Christina to be permanently replaced by another actress until she could return to the show. Monty added, "I'll tell you that I saw Joan Crawford do everything she could to save that girl's life and job."

Bette Davis, Crawford's lifelong rival, also defended Crawford. "I was not Miss Crawford's biggest fan but, wisecracks to the contrary, I did and still do respect her talent. What she did not deserve was that detestable book written by her daughter. I've forgotten her name. Horrible."

Since the publication of Mommie Dearest in 1978, Christina has attempted to capitalize on its monetary success with a one-woman show entitled "Surviving Mommie Dearest" in 2013, and in 2019, attempted to produce a musical version of her memoir, though it did not come to fruition.

== Autobiographies ==
- A Portrait of Joan: The Autobiography of Joan Crawford. Doubleday. 1962. ISBN 978-1-258-17238-1.
- My Way of Life. Simon & Schuster. 1971. ISBN 978-0-671-78568-0.

== Bibliography ==
=== Sources ===
- Considine, Shaun (1989). Bette and Joan: The Divine Feud. New York, E. P. Dutton, a division of Penguin Books. ISBN 0-525-24770-X.
- Bret, David (2006). Joan Crawford: Hollywood Martyr. Robson. ISBN 1-86105-931-0.
- Granlund, Nils T. (1957). Blondes, Brunettes, and Bullets. New York, David McKay Company.
- Hoefling, Larry J. (2008). Nils Thor Granlund: The Swedish Showman Who Invented American Entertainment. Inlandia Press. ISBN 0-9822313-0-X.
- LaSalle, Mick (2000). Complicated Women: Sex and Power in Pre-Code Hollywood. New York, Thomas Dunne Books, an imprint of St. Martin's Press. ISBN 0-312-25207-2.
- Dunaway, Faye (1998). Looking For Gatsby. Pocket. ISBN 0-671-67526-5.
- Leese, Elizabeth (1991). Costume Design in the Movies. Dover Books. ISBN 0-486-26548-X.
- Newquist, Roy, with introduction by John Springer (1980). Conversations with Joan Crawford. New Jersey, Citadel Press, a division of Lyle Stuart, Inc. ISBN 0-8065-0720-9.
- Quirk, Lawrence J. and William Schoell. (2002). Joan Crawford: the essential biography. University Press of Kentucky. ISBN 0-8131-2254-6.
- Skal, David J. (1993). The Monster Show: A Cultural History of Horror. Penguin Books. ISBN 0-14-024002-0.
- Thomas, Bob (1978). Joan Crawford: A Biography. New York, Bantam Books. ISBN 0-553-12942-2.

=== Further reading ===
- Carr, Larry (1970). Four Fabulous Faces: The Evolution and Metamorphosis of Swanson, Garbo, Crawford and Dietrich. New York: Doubleday. ISBN 0-87000-108-6.
- Nowak, Donna Marie (2010). Just Joan: A Joan Crawford Appreciation. Albany: BearManor Media. ISBN 978-1-59393-542-9.
