= Jacques-François le Sueur =

French Jesuit missionary and linguist

- Born: July 22, 1685 or 1686; Coutances, Normandy or Lunel, Languedoc, France
- Died: April 28, 1760 or 1755; Montreal or Quebec, Canada
- Other names: François Eustache, Jacques François, Jacques
- Occupations: Jesuit missionary, linguist
- Years active: 1715–1753
- Known for: Abnaki missions in Canada; Abnaki dictionary and religious writings
- Notable work: History of the Calumet and of the Dance (1744)

Jacques-François le Sueur (French pronunciation: [ʒak fʁɑ̃swa lə sɥœʁ]), also known as François Eustache ([østaʃ]), Jacques François, and Jacques, was an 18th-century French Jesuit missionary and linguist, of the Abnaki missions in Canada.

== Life ==
Although the principal facts of le Sueur's work and writings are well known, there is uncertainty as to dates, places, and even his proper name. This uncertainty is probably largely due to the burning of the St. Francis mission, with all its records, by the English in 1759. According to different sources, he was born either near Coutances, Normandy, or in Lunel, in Languedoc, on either 22 July 1685 or 1686; he died either at Montreal, 28 or 26 April 1760, or at Quebec, in 1755.

He entered the Jesuit novitiate in 1704 or 1705, and arrived in Canada in 1715 or 1716. He studied the language for some months at the Abnaki mission of Sillery, and then began work at Bécancour, another Abnaki mission, on the St. Lawrence River, where, with the exception of occasional parochial service, he remained until 1753, when he retired to Quebec. Under the influence of le Sueur, the previously faltering Bécancour mission became one of the most active in North America.

== Works ==
The writings of le Sueur included prayers, sermons, a catechism, etc., in the Abnaki language, as well as a now-lost 900-page Dictionary of Abnaki.

He also wrote History of the Calumet and of the Dance, a short memoir from 1744 discussing Jesuit attempts to suppress indigenous Abnaki religious practices including the calumet dance. The original French manuscript is preserved at St. Francis mission, Pierreville, Canada, and was published in the "Soirées Canadiennes" of 1864. Manuscript copies are kept in Collège Sainte-Marie de Montréal, and with the Wisconsin Historical Society.
