= 1993 in Australia =

- Monarch: Elizabeth II
- Governor-General: Bill Hayden
- Prime minister: Paul Keating
- Population: 17,667,093
- Elections: WA, Federal, SA

The following lists events that happened during 1993 in Australia.

- Decades: 1970s; 1980s; 1990s; 2000s; 2010s
- See also: 1993 in Australian television; 1993 in Australian literature; Other events of 1993; Federal election; Timeline of Australian history

== Incumbents ==
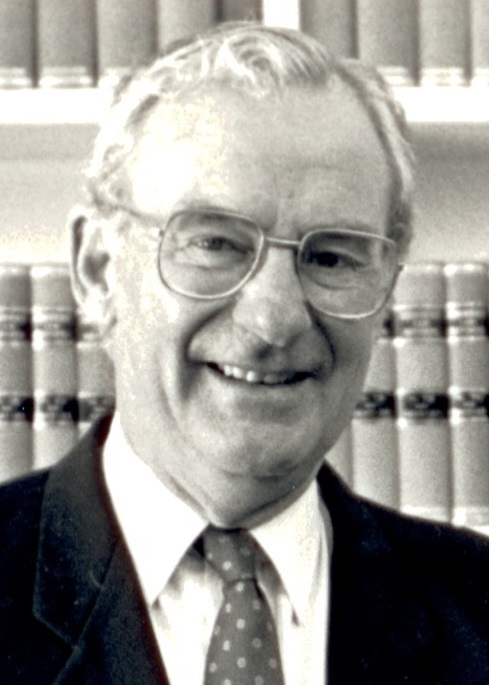
Bill Hayden

Paul Keating

- Monarch – Elizabeth II
- Governor-General – Bill Hayden
- Prime Minister – Paul Keating
  - Deputy Prime Minister – Brian Howe
  - Opposition Leader – John Hewson
- Chief Justice – Sir Anthony Mason

=== State and territory leaders ===
- Premier of New South Wales – John Fahey
  - Opposition Leader – Bob Carr
- Premier of Queensland – Wayne Goss
  - Opposition Leader – Rob Borbidge
- Premier of South Australia – Lynn Arnold (until 14 December), then Dean Brown
  - Opposition Leader – Dean Brown (until 14 December), then Lynn Arnold
- Premier of Tasmania – Ray Groom
  - Opposition Leader – Michael Field
- Premier of Victoria – Jeff Kennett
  - Opposition Leader – Joan Kirner (until 22 March), then Jim Kennan (until 29 June), then John Brumby (from 28 September)
- Premier of Western Australia – Carmen Lawrence (until 16 February), then Richard Court
  - Opposition Leader – Richard Court (until 16 February), then Carmen Lawrence
- Chief Minister of the Australian Capital Territory – Rosemary Follett
  - Opposition Leader – Trevor Kaine (until 21 April), then Kate Carnell
- Chief Minister of the Northern Territory – Marshall Perron
  - Opposition Leader – Brian Ede
- Head of Government of Norfolk Island – John Brown

=== Governors and administrators ===
- Governor of New South Wales – Peter Sinclair
- Governor of Queensland – Leneen Forde
- Governor of South Australia – Roma Mitchell
- Governor of Tasmania – Sir Phillip Bennett
- Governor of Victoria – Richard McGarvie
- Governor of Western Australia – Francis Burt (until 31 October), then Michael Jeffery
- Administrator of Norfolk Island – Alan Kerr
- Administrator of the Northern Territory – James Muirhead (until 1 March), then Austin Asche

== Events ==
=== January ===
- 1 January – 1962 Cabinet papers are released to the public.
- 7 January – West Australian Premier Carmen Lawrence announces a 6 February election date.
- 9 January – Prime Minister Paul Keating denies any involvement in a multimillion-dollar salami venture with a Hungarian company in the NSW Hunter Valley, as had been alleged by Senator Michael Baume.
- 13 January – National Party Leader Tim Fischer calls on Japan to apologise for Japanese atrocities committed during World War II.
- 20 January – A funeral is held for former Governor-General, Sir Paul Hasluck in St. George's Cathedral, Perth.
- 21 January – The Australian dollar slumps to its lowest level since early 1987 (US 66.3c) prompting international investors to abandon the currency and a rescue intervention effort from the Reserve Bank of Australia.
- 22 January –
  - Prime Minister Paul Keating releases a statement revealing that he is suing Senator Michael Baume over comments he made in a 3AW radio interview about Mr. Keating's involvement in a Scone piggery, Danpork and tax concessions for which he applied.
  - Shell Australia announces plans to close more than half of the nation's oldest colliery, the South Bulli Mine, leading to 230 job losses for New South Wales coal miners.
- 25 January – The Remuneration Tribunal announces that MPs will have their pay boosted by 1.4 per cent from 11 March.
- 28 January –
  - The Federal Government curtails MDS microwave delivery as a secondary pay TV system to satellite and calls off the auction for new MDS licences, a decision which Prime Minister Paul Keating claims is to stop "inferior technology" – the microwave system – from hijacking the pay-TV industry.
  - Federal Treasurer John Dawkins announces that the Federal Government is revising its Budget forecasts for growth in 1992–93 from 3 per cent to 2.5 per cent.
- 31 January – New South Wales Transport Minister, Mr. Baird, announces that 2,000 jobs will disappear from the State Rail Authority this year and stressed that all redundancies would be voluntary.

=== February ===
- 6 February – Elections in Western Australia see the ALP government of Carmen Lawrence voted out and the Liberal Party voted in. Richard Court becomes the new premier.
- 9 February – The Australian Labor Party releases its election package. The Coalition holds a commanding lead in the polls during the first week of the campaign.
- 23 February - Arrests of Harold Bernard Wiggins (Bernie/Harry) 28 for the murder of Kenneth John Knight.
- 25 February - Arrest of Damien Troy Davis 21 for the murder of Kenneth John Knight.
- 28 February - The state of Victoria changes the give way rule for opposing traffic turning into the same street to 'left turn before right turn', bringing it in line with all other states.

=== March ===
- 7 March – Two prisoners, Peter Gibb and Archie Butterley, escape from the Melbourne Remand Centre with the help of prison officer Heather Parker.
- 13 March – Paul Keating and the ALP win the federal 'unwinnable election' and are re-elected for a fifth term in power. Labor increases its primary vote by 5.5% to 44.9% and its seats by 2 to 80. The Coalition, on 44.3%, up 0.9%, won 65 seats (Liberals 49, Nationals 16), a loss of 4. The Australian Democrats fell dramatically in both houses, although their winning of Senate seats in South Australia and Queensland still leaves them with a total of 7 in all.
- 22 March – The Federal Liberal Party re-elects John Hewson as leader by a 17-vote majority against contended John Howard. Deputy Leader Peter Reith retires to the backbench after losing to Michael Wooldridge. Tim Fischer fights off a challenge from Ian Sinclair to remain National Party leader, with John Anderson as Deputy Leader.
- 24 March – Following several retirements, the new Cabinet includes a predominance (13 out of 19) from the right. Newcomers include Michael Lavarch, Peter Baldwin, Laurie Brereton, Bob McMullan and Michael Lee.

=== April ===
- 28 April – At a speech to the Evatt Foundation, Prime Minister Paul Keating announces the appointment of 7 broadly representative eminent persons to a Republic Advisory Committee, chaired by Malcolm Turnbull. It reports on 5 October.
- 29 April – Acting leader Cheryl Kernot is confirmed as leader of the Australian Democrats by an 81% vote of the membership. She is given a mandate to pursue more mainstream policy objectives and to reform the party's cumbersome internal procedures.

=== June ===
- 8 June – A Council of Australian Governments (COAG) Mabo Summit collapses on the issues of states' rights and states' interests.

=== July ===
- 22 July – Prime Minister Paul Keating's Budget statement denies breaking election promises, although the second tranche of tax cuts will be deferred until 1998.

=== August ===
- 4 August – Coles Myer announces a $4 billion expansion plan creating 100,000 new jobs & spanning five years.
- 18 August – The Senate supports the motion of West Australian Green MP Christabel Chamarette to impose a "double deadline" on bills from the House of Representatives, refusing to guarantee dealing with bills which had not been introduced to the House by 1 October and reached the Senate by 29 October. Exceptions are allowed for, but the Federal Government is enraged.
- 28 August – HMAS Collins (SSG 73), the first of the Collins Class submarine, becomes the first Australian-built and designed submarine to launch.
- 30 August – Caucus' Economic Committee attacks Prime Minister Paul Keating over the Dawkins Budget. Annoyed at the favourable publicity being received by the Australian Democrats as the voice of fairness, the Labor left and right factions combine to insist on compromises.

=== September ===
- 24 September – Sydney wins bid to host the 2000 Olympic Games over the Chinese city of Beijing. This followed two previous unsuccessful Australian bids from Brisbane for the 1992 Olympics and Melbourne for the 1996 Olympics.

=== October ===
- 1 October – The Senate approves a new oath of office which omits any reference to the Queen.
- 14 October –
  - Liberal MP and former Fraser Government cabinet minister Jim Carlton announces his intention to resign from the House of Representatives as the federal member for Mackellar. His resignation will trigger a 1994 Mackellar by-election, clearing the way for senator Bronwyn Bishop to contest the safe Liberal seat in an attempt to enter the House of Representatives.
  - Northern Territory shadow minister and former VFL footballer Maurice Rioli resigns from the Opposition Front Bench after admitting to pawning government property including a television set, a car fridge and a microwave oven to support a gambling habit.
  - An 8-year-old girl is killed and her 6-year-old brother sustains critical injuries when they are hit by a truck as they run into the road from in front of their school bus in the Sydney suburb of Doonside. The accident prompts the New South Wales Government to pledge that all school buses across the state will be fitted with flashing lights and warning signs as part of a package designed to improve safety around school buses which would also include an education campaign for children.
- 20 October – Prime Minister Paul Keating changes his mind and decides against a recommendation to allow wider televising of parliamentary debate, including points of order and comments later withdrawn.

=== November ===
- 7 November – 18-year-old Aboriginal dancer Daniel Alfred Yock dies shortly after being arrested by Queensland Police Service officers in Brisbane. The Aboriginal death in custody prompts widespread anger, protests and a Criminal Justice Commission Inquiry which ultimately clears the police of any wrongdoing, although the Aboriginal community rejects the findings.
- 16 November – Prime Minister Paul Keating tables Native Title legislation in Parliament.
- 23 November – Native title legislation reaches the Senate, where a marathon debate and numerous amendments are negotiated with the Australian Greens and the Australian Democrats.
- 26 November – Construction begins on Brisbane's new $250 million International Airport Terminal.

=== December ===
- 11 December – Dean Brown and the Liberal Party win the South Australian elections, winning government from Lynn Arnold and the ALP.
- 17 December – Ralph Willis replaces John Dawkins as Federal Treasurer after John Dawkins goes to the backbench, announcing his imminent retirement.
- 21 December – The Native Title Act is passed, which extinguishes indigenous claims to land except those on pastoral leases. Federal Opposition Leader John Hewson declares that the legislation is "monstrous", while Premiers Jeff Kennett and Richard Court state that it would be unworkable.

== Arts and literature ==
- Alex Miller's novel The Ancestor Game wins the Miles Franklin Award

== Film ==
- The Heartbreak Kid
- The Piano (1993) – New Zealand co-production, won 3 Oscars and received a further 5 nominations. AFI winner for Best Film
- Reckless Kelly

== Television ==
- 3 March – The "birthday cake interview" with John Hewson takes place on A Current Affair. Hewson's confused explanation of the effect of a consumption tax in the Coalition's Fightback! package is seen as a crucial factor in the surprise re-election of the ALP at the federal election.
- 30 July – A Country Practice is axed after 1,058 episodes by the Seven Network. The final episode aired on 22 November, Network Ten pick up the series the following year, but it is nowhere near as successful as the Channel Seven version and is axed soon after.
- 25 November – Ray Martin presents his final episode of Midday. He moves on to A Current Affair in 1994 and is replaced in the Midday role by Derryn Hinch.

== Sport ==
- 5 March – First day of the Australian Track & Field Championships for the 1992–1993 season, which are held at the QEII Stadium in Brisbane, Queensland.
- 10 April – Jason A Richardson won the Stawell Gift in 11.94secs
- 16 May – Marconi Fairfield equal the record of 4 national titles by beating Adelaide City in the NSL Final.
- 4 June – Shane Warne, in his first delivery of Ashes cricket, delivers what has been described as the "Ball of the Century" to Mike Gatting, bowling the Englishman.
- 18 July – Sean Quilty wins his second men's national marathon title, clocking 2:15:31 in Brisbane, while Karen McCann claims her second women's title in 2:40:10.
- 25 September – Essendon (20.13.133) defeat Carlton (13.11.89) to win the 97th VFL/AFL premiership.
- 26 September – Brisbane Broncos (14) defeat the St. George Dragons (6) for the second consecutive year to win the 86th NSWRL premiership. Dragons lock Brad Mackay is awarded the Clive Churchill medal for man of the match. Gold Coast Seagulls finish in last position, claiming their third consecutive wooden spoon.
- 17 November – The Socceroos lose to Argentina 0–1 in Buenos Aires in the CONMEBOL/CONCACAF-OFC playoff, thereby failing to qualify for the 1994 FIFA World Cup on aggregate.

== Births ==
- 8 January – James Tedesco, rugby league player
- 18 January – Sean Keenan, actor
- 21 January – Ben Meehan, rugby union player
- 4 February – Jack Wighton, rugby league player
- 13 February – Adam Clydsdale, rugby league player
- 1 March – Kurt Mann, rugby league player
- 3 March – Nicola Bolger, football (soccer) player
- 11 March – Demi Harman, actress
- 30 March – Javid Bowen, rugby league player
- 1 April – Mitch Norton, basketball player
- 8 April – Zac Santo, rugby league player
- 8 May – Pat Cummins, cricketer
- 16 May – Steven Solomon, sprinter
- 26 May – Dan Sarginson, Australian-English rugby league player
- 9 June – Jack Debreczeni, rugby union player
- 13 June – Danial Williams, Muay Thai kickboxer and mixed martial artist
- 14 June – Gurinder Sandhu, cricketer
- 29 June – Harrison Gilbertson, actor
- 7 July – Venky Jois, basketball player
- 9 July – Mitch Larkin, Olympic swimmer
- 16 July – Billy Ward, Olympic boxer (died 2013)
- 27 July – Reagan Campbell-Gillard, rugby league player
- 31 July – Christian Byers, actor
- 11 August – Luke Erceg, actor
- 14 August – Cassi Thomson, actress and singer
- 18 August – Maia Mitchell, actress
- 24 August – Alanah Pearce, video game writer
- 2 September – Montana Cox, model
- 4 September – Mark Vincent, pop opera singer
- 9 September – Tessa Wallace, swimmer
- 10 September – Sam Kerr, soccer player
- 13 September – Aisha Dee, actress
- 1 November – Laura Pugh, female rules footballer
- 18 November – Kyle Adnam, basketball player
- 19 November – Cleo Massey, actress
- 11 December – Tyrone Gilks, motorbike stunt rider (died 2013)
- 13 December – Shaun Edwards, rules footballer (Greater Western Sydney)
- 22 December – David Klemmer, rugby league player
- 29 December - Travis Head, cricketer

== Deaths ==
- 10 February – Fred Hollows, ophthalmologist (born in New Zealand) (b. 1929)
- 2 July – Sir Edward "Weary" Dunlop, surgeon and soldier (b. 1907)
- 21 July – E. J. G. Pitman, mathematician (b. 1897)
- 28 August – Ainslie Roberts, painter, photographer, and artist (born in the United Kingdom) (b. 1911)
- 30 September – Dick Harris, Australian rules footballer (Richmond) (b. 1911)
- 2 October – Ted Harris, Queensland politician (b. 1911)
- 6 November – Michael Vernon, consumer activist (born in the United Kingdom) (b. 1932)
- 7 November – Daniel Yock, Aboriginal dancer (b. 1975)
- 20 November – Eve van Grafhorst, first Australian child to be infected with HIV via a blood transfusion (died in New Zealand) (b. 1982)

== See also ==
- 1993 in Australian television
- List of Australian films of 1993
