= 2013 in Australia =

- Monarch: Elizabeth II
- Governor-General: Quentin Bryce
- Prime minister: Julia Gillard, then Kevin Rudd, then Tony Abbott
- Australian of the Year: Ita Buttrose
- Elections: WA, Federal

The following lists events that happened during 2013 in Australia.

- Decades: 1990s; 2000s; 2010s; 2020s; 2030s
- See also: 2013 in Australian television; 2013 in Australian literature; Other events of 2013; Federal election; Timeline of Australian history

== Incumbents ==
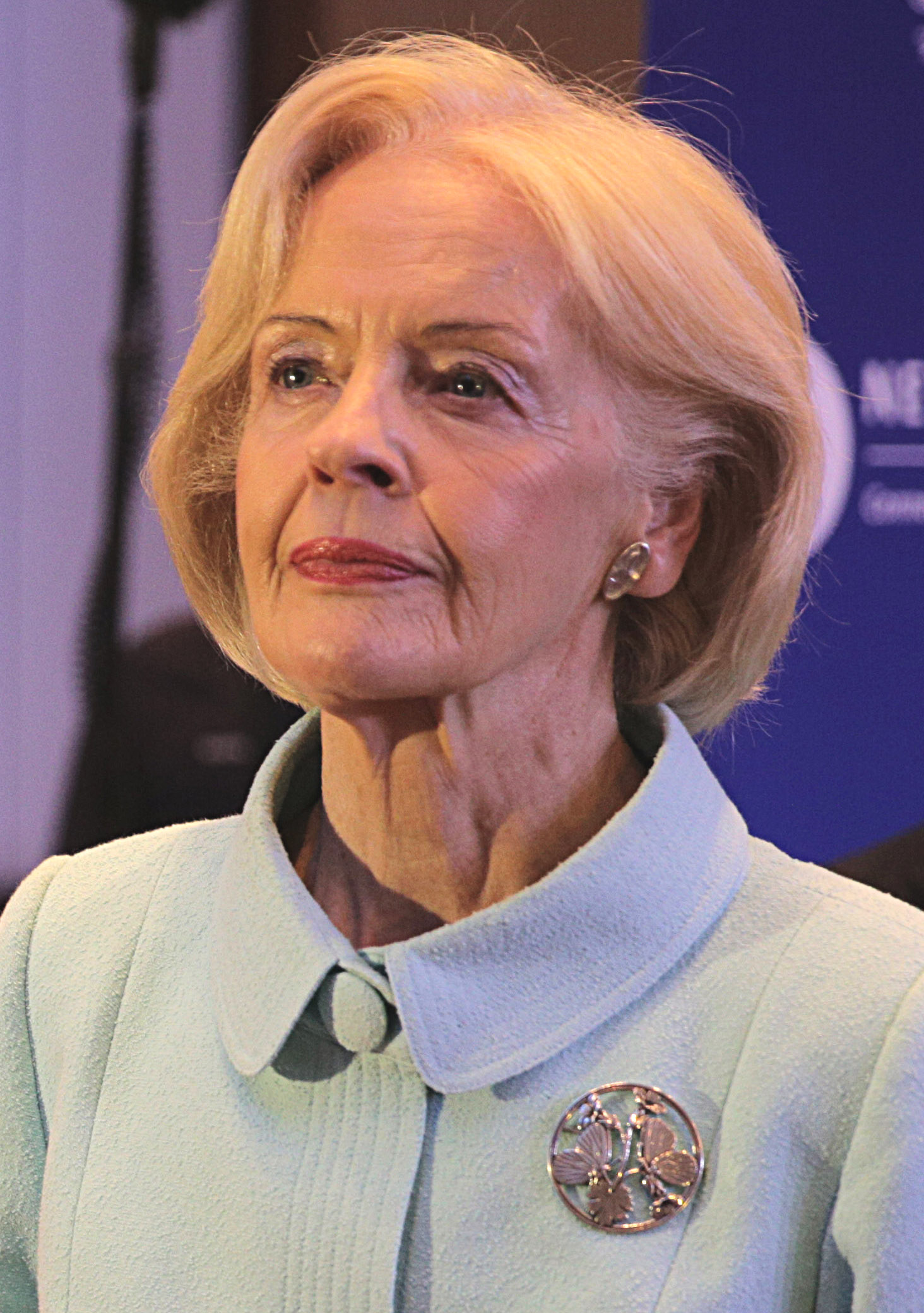
Quentin Bryce

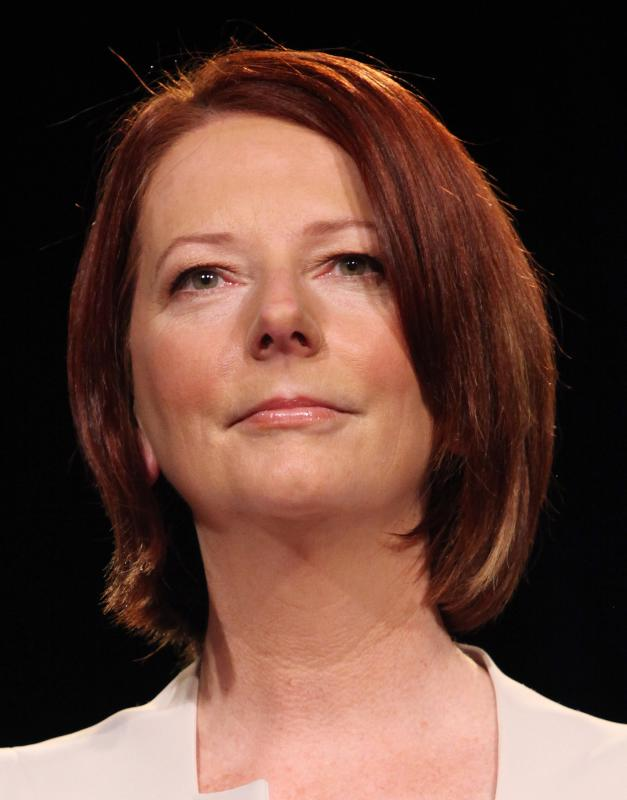
Julia Gillard

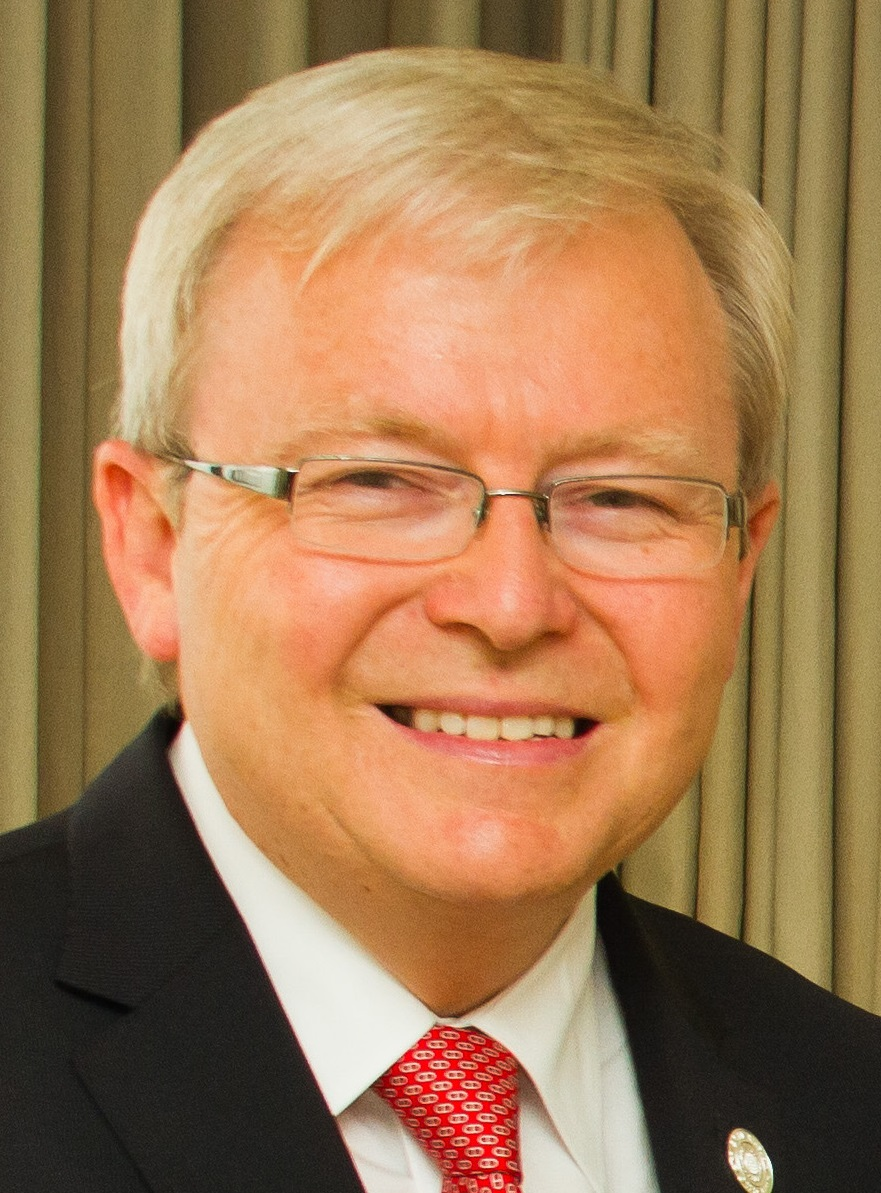
Kevin Rudd

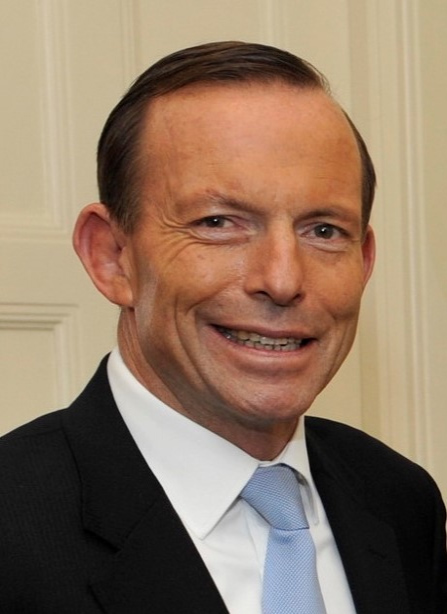
Tony Abbott

- Monarch – Elizabeth II
- Governor-General – Quentin Bryce
- Prime Minister – Julia Gillard (until 27 June), then Kevin Rudd (until 18 September), then Tony Abbott
  - Deputy Prime Minister – Wayne Swan (until 27 June), then Anthony Albanese (until 18 September), then Warren Truss
  - Opposition Leader – Tony Abbott (until 18 September), then Chris Bowen (until 13 October), then Bill Shorten
- Chief Justice – Robert French

=== State and territory leaders ===
- Premier of New South Wales – Barry O'Farrell
  - Opposition Leader – John Robertson
- Premier of Queensland – Campbell Newman
  - Opposition Leader – Annastacia Palaszczuk
- Premier of South Australia – Jay Weatherill
  - Opposition Leader – Isobel Redmond (until 31 January), then Steven Marshall
- Premier of Tasmania – Lara Giddings
  - Opposition Leader – Will Hodgman
- Premier of Victoria – Ted Baillieu (until 6 March), then Denis Napthine
  - Opposition Leader – Daniel Andrews
- Premier of Western Australia – Colin Barnett
  - Opposition Leader – Mark McGowan
- Chief Minister of the Australian Capital Territory – Katy Gallagher
  - Opposition Leader – Zed Seselja (until 11 February), then Jeremy Hanson
- Chief Minister of the Northern Territory – Terry Mills (until 13 March), then Adam Giles
  - Opposition Leader – Delia Lawrie
- Chief Minister of Norfolk Island – David Buffett (until 20 March), then Lisle Snell

=== Governors and administrators ===
- Governor of New South Wales – Marie Bashir
- Governor of Queensland – Penelope Wensley
- Governor of South Australia – Kevin Scarce
- Governor of Tasmania – Peter Underwood
- Governor of Victoria – Alex Chernov
- Governor of Western Australia – Malcolm McCusker
- Administrator of the Australian Indian Ocean Territories – Jon Stanhope
- Administrator of Norfolk Island – Neil Pope
- Administrator of the Northern Territory – Sally Thomas

== Events ==
=== January ===
- 4–20 January – A heat wave in south-eastern Australia results in several bushfires in Tasmania.
- 23 January – A monsoon trough passes over parts of Queensland and New South Wales, causing severe storms, flooding, and tornadoes.
- 27–28 January – Cyclone Oswald causes heavy rainfall and flooding in Queensland.
- 30 January – Prime Minister Julia Gillard announces the date of the 2013 federal election as 14 September.

=== February ===
- 5 February –
  - Federal Environment Minister Tony Burke and Communications Minister Stephen Conroy admit that they received free holiday accommodation from allegedly corrupt former state MP Eddie Obeid.
  - Gold Coast mother, Novy Chardon, aged 34, goes missing from her Upper Coomera home, sparking a police search.
- 14 February – The Supreme Court of Queensland orders that serial rapist Robert John Fardon should be released because any risks which he posed to the community could be managed.
- 15 February –
  - Queensland Premier Campbell Newman announces that the Department of Transport and Main Roads Director-General Michael Caltabiano has been dismissed. In October 2012, Mr Caltabiano was referred to State Parliament's ethics committee for comments he made in an estimates committee hearing about Ben Gommers, son of former arts minister Ros Bates.
  - Queensland Arts Minister, Ros Bates, resigns amid controversy, with scandals having recently emerged over alleged irregularities with her lobbyist contact register, the Crime and Misconduct investigation into the appointment of her son Ben Gommers to a departmental role, and links to Michael Caltabiano.
- 21 February – Immigration Minister Brendan O'Connor urges the Coalition to rethink its opposition to the Malaysian solution, after the reported deaths of 98 asylum seekers who were trying to make their way to Indonesia or Australia.
- 24 February – Severe flooding occurs in Northern New South Wales, as well as a severe damage in Sydney's south-west, leaving many homes without power.

=== March ===
- 1 March – Myer's annual Autumn/Winter Collection show is held in Melbourne.
- 2 March –
  - A severe weather system dumps widespread heavy rain on Queensland. 71 mm of rain falls in Bundaberg before 9 am. Wivenhoe Dam reaches 101% capacity.
  - Veteran TV journalist Peter Harvey dies in Sydney hospital after a battle with pancreatic cancer.
- 3 March – Prime Minister Julia Gillard starts a campaign in Western Sydney and announces a new federal taskforce to crack down on criminal gangs.
- 6 March – Ted Baillieu stands down as Premier of Victoria and is replaced by Denis Napthine.
- 8 March – The Queen Street Mall in Brisbane goes into lockdown after Lee Matthew Hillier threatens plain clothes police officers with what they believed was a handgun while they were doing random street checks.
- 9 March – The 2013 Western Australian state election is held. The Liberal Party led by Colin Barnett retains government, winning a majority in its own right.
- 13 March – The Country Liberal Party in the Northern Territory elects Adam Giles as party leader while Terry Mills is overseas on a trade visit to Japan. Giles is sworn in as Chief Minister—Australia's first indigenous head of government—the next day on 14 March.
- 21 March –
  - Prime Minister Julia Gillard makes a speech apologising on behalf of the Federal Government to families affected by forced adoption in Australia.
  - Simon Crean calls on the Prime Minister to bring on a leadership spill to resolve tensions in the Labor Party, which she does. Expected challenger Kevin Rudd announces he will not contest the ballot, and Gillard is re-elected leader unopposed.
- 26 March – The Parliament of South Australia pass a bill that recognises Aboriginal people in the state Constitution.
- 28 March – A freak accident kills three pedestrians when a wall collapses in the Melbourne suburb of Carlton.
- 30 March – The Murrawarri Republic declares its independence from the Commonwealth of Australia.

=== April ===
- 6 April – Brisbane City Hall is officially re-opened to the public following a three-year restoration
- 10 April
  - Prime Minister Julia Gillard ends her trip to China with an agreement for annual leadership talks with the new Chinese Premier Li Keqiang. They also signed agreements to set up an expert group to drive co-operation on carbon trading, engaged in a new round of defence talks and agreed to work together on aid and development in the Asia Pacific region.
  - Child killer Allyson McConnell is deported to Australia from Canada after serving just 15 months for killing her two young sons by drowning them. The leniency in sentencing provokes outrage, with Alberta Justice Minister Jonathan Denis appealing against the sentence and promising to seek her extradition.
- 13 April – The Federal Government announces $2 billion worth of cuts to the university sector.
- 14 April – Prime Minister Julia Gillard announces $14.5 billion worth of funding for schools over the next six years to mark one year since the release of the Gonski review.
- 17 April – Australia's greatest racing horse since Phar Lap and one of the greatest mares in world history, Black Caviar is retired on an unbeaten record of 25 wins.
- 27 April – On the final day of the Sydney Racing Carnival, John Singleton sacks Gai Waterhouse as his trainer following mare More Joyous' loss in the race, claiming that Waterhouse's bookmaker son, Tom Waterhouse, had the night before expressed his suspicions to friends of Singleton's over More Joyous' physical condition and believed that it had no chance of winning the race. The incident prompts an inquiry, as well as debates over whether live betting odds should be permitted during televised sporting matches.
- April – Allen Consulting Group and ACIL Tasman merge to form ACIL Allen.

=== May ===
- 3 May – The Federal Government unveils a white paper on defence, setting an aspirational goal of increasing defence spending to 2 per cent of GDP, as well as the purchase of a dozen new FA18 fighter jets. Prime Minister Julia Gillard also says that her government wants to see more transparency from China on their military developments.
- 9 May – Federal Opposition Leader, Tony Abbott, unveils the Coalition's industrial relations policy, saying workers have nothing to fear, promising sensible, careful and incremental changes. He foreshadows a review of the system in the first term of an Abbott Government.
- 10 May – Michael Boggan, aged 15, of Ipswich, Queensland, suffers severe injuries after a home-made bomb in the form of a golf ball detonates in his hands.

=== June ===
- 3 June – Fair Work Australia announces a 2.6 per cent increase in the minimum wage, prompting criticism from the Australian Council of Trade Unions.
- 5 June – Prime Minister Julia Gillard orders an inquiry into the intelligence agencies' handling of a case involving a convicted Egyptian terrorist, Sayad Latif, who arrived in Australia last year as an asylum seeker.
- 6 June – New South Wales Police announce a $100,000 reward for information on the 23 Dec 1982 bombings of the Israeli Consulate in Sydney and the Hakoah Club at Bondi.
- 7 June – The Reserve Bank of Australia decides to lower the official cash rate to 2.75 per cent – its lowest level in more than 50 years.
- 8 June – The Queensland Government signs up to the National Disability Insurance Scheme.
- 12 June – Prime Minister Julia Gillard during Question Time calls on the Opposition to disendorse Liberal candidate Mal Brough after a menu that made lewd and offensive jokes about her anatomy was used at his party fund-raiser. The menu, used at an event in March, lists Julia Gillard Kentucky Fried Quail before going on to describe it as Small breasts, huge thighs & a big red box.
- 26 June – Kevin Rudd defeats Julia Gillard 57 to 45 in an Australian Labor Party leadership spill.
- 30 June – The Sydney Monorail is closed.

=== July ===
- 1 July – Prime Minister Kevin Rudd's new ministry is sworn in at a ceremony at Government House, Canberra.
  - Labor MP, Simon Crean, announces that he'll retire from politics at the next election.
- 4 July – An inquest into the deaths of three men working under the Rudd Government's pink batts home insulation scheme finds that inadequate training, safety and supervision were all to blame for their deaths. The coroner's report also states that industry groups warned the Federal Government about the risks of the scheme, but were ignored.
  - Prime Minister Kevin Rudd announces a major crackdown on corruption in the New South Wales branch of Labor Party.
- 5 July – Prime Minister Kevin Rudd meets with Indonesian President, Susilo Bambang Yudhoyono, and announces the establishment of the Indonesia-Australia Red Meat and Beef Forum to improve and grow Indonesia's cattle industry, in an effort to defuse diplomatic tensions over cancelled beef exports.
- 9 July – Giant telescope Murchison Widefield Array telescope in Western Australia, goes online.
- 11 July – Prime Minister Kevin Rudd uses an address at the National Press Club in Canberra to lobby for a new "productivity pact" between businesses, unions and the Federal Government in an effort to lift the rate of annual productivity growth, as well as smoothing the transition from mining to non-mining led growth. The Prime Minister also accuses the Opposition of planning to "implement a slash and burn austerity drive across the nation".
- 14 July – Federal Treasurer Chris Bowen announces that the Federal Government has agreed to scrap the fixed carbon price and move to a floating price on carbon on 1 July next year – one year earlier than scheduled.
- 23 July – The Australian Security Intelligence Organisation's AUD $630 million New Central Office is opened in Canberra.

=== August ===
- 3 August – Simon Kruger, a seven-year-old boy, goes missing in the bush after wandering away from a family picnic. He is found by searchers the next day, and claimed that a kangaroo had kept him warm as he slept under a tree.
- 12 August – The Euahlayi Nation declares its independence from the Commonwealth of Australia.

=== September ===
- 7 September – The Liberal–National coalition led by Tony Abbott wins the 2013 federal election.
- 14 September – Two prisoners force the Brisbane Correctional Centre into lockdown in a rooftop protest.
- 27 September – Two large brawls involving members of the Bandidos bikie gang and another outlaw motorcycle club erupted outside a restaurant on Broadbeach on Queensland's Gold Coast, prompting the arrest of eighteen people and setting in motion a chain of events that would lead to the enactment of the Newman government's Vicious Lawless Association Disestablishment Act 2013 (VLAD) laws.

=== October ===
- 3–11 October – The International Fleet Review is held on Sydney Harbour to celebrate the centenary of the first entry of the Royal Australian Navy fleet in to the harbour.
- 7 October – Prime Minister, Tony Abbott, attends the Asia Pacific Economic Co-operation (APEC) summit in Bali. After meeting with China's president, Xi Jinping, he says he is confident he could get a free trade deal with China within 12 months. He also addresses the lingering concern in Indonesia about his asylum seeker policies.
- 9 October – John Hancock and Bianca Rinehart's civil trial against their mother, Gina Rinehart, begins in the NSW Supreme Court. They're suing their mother for alleged misconduct as trustee. The family are also fighting over control of a family trust worth billions.
- 13 October – Bill Shorten is elected leader of the federal Labor Party, beating Anthony Albanese and receiving 52 per cent of the caucus, prompting his mother-in-law, Governor-General Quentin Bryce, to offer her resignation "to avoid any perception of bias".
- 17 October –
  - The 2013 New South Wales bushfires begin.
  - The Queensland Parliament passes with bipartisan support its Vicious Lawless Association Disestablishment (VLAD)laws targeting outlaw bikie gangs after a marathon debate. The legislation names 26 "criminal organisations", including the Bandidos, Finks and Mongols. It restricts their members' and associates' movements and meetings, and increases minimum sentences for their crimes.
- 22 October – The Marriage Equality Act 2013 is passed in the Australian Capital Territory, making the ACT the first state or territory to legalise same-sex marriage in Australia.

=== November ===
- 18 November – Material leaked by NSA contractor Edward Snowden reveals that Australian intelligence agencies had attempted to tap the phones of the President of Indonesia, his wife, and other officials. In response, Indonesia recalls its ambassador, and threatens other consequences.
- 23 November – 35-year-old man, Chris Boyd, is killed by a Great White Shark at Gracetown, off the south-west coast of Western Australia. A "catch and kill" order was issued to permit the destruction of the shark.
- 29 November – A young surfer, 18-year-old Zac Young, died after shark attack Riecks Point beach near Coffs Harbour.

=== December ===
- 1 December – Thousands of motorbike riders protest new anti-bikie laws outside Brisbane's Parliament House.
- 6 December – The Queensland Court of Appeal decides to release serial rapist Robert John Fardon from prison after the Queensland Attorney-General withdrew a last-minute application to prevent his release.
- 10 December –
  - The analog television signal is switched off in Victoria, completing Australia's digital television transition.
  - Federal Environment Minister Greg Hunt approves the expansion of the controversial Abbot Point coal terminal in north Queensland.
- 11 December – Car manufacturer Holden announces it will cease production of vehicles in Australia by 2017.
- 13 December – Prime Minister, Tony Abbott, holds his first Council of Australian Governments (COAG) meeting. The states and territories agree to have sole responsibility for the environmental assessment of major developments and to focus on boosting the school attendance rates of Indigenous children. It is confirmed that the national paid parental leave scheme will include state public servants.
- 18 December – The Federal Government unveils its $100 million assistance package to help Holden and the manufacturing industry.
- 20 December – A two-hour siege took place outside Sydney's Parliament House when a man in his car threatened to set himself alight.
- 23 December – A Royal Commission into the Rudd Government's home insulation scheme begins in Brisbane.
- 26 December –
  - Acting Prime Minister, Warren Truss, announces that Australia will provide two military aircraft to South Sudan to aid in the current military crisis.
  - A mother and her teenage daughter are held hostage during a siege at a house in the suburb of Banyo in Brisbane.
- 30 December – Cyclone Christine intensifies into a category 3 cyclone causing heavy rainfall across a large section of the West Australian Pilbara coast. The towns of Roebourne and Wickham receive significant damage.

== Arts and literature ==
- 22 March – Del Kathryn Barton wins the Archibald Prize for the second time, for her portrait of actor Hugo Weaving.
- 19 June – Michelle de Kretser wins the Miles Franklin Award for her novel Questions of Travel.

== Sport ==
- 14–27 January – Tennis: The 2013 Australian Open is held. Victoria Azarenka wins the Women's Singles and Novak Djokovic wins the Men's Singles.
- 9 February – Rugby league: The 2013 All Stars match is won by the Indigenous All Stars, who defeat the NRL All Stars 32–6. Ben Barba is awarded the Preston Campbell award for Man of the Match. The Women's All Stars match is held at the same event.
- 17 February – Cricket: Australia wins the 2013 Women's Cricket World Cup in India.
- 22 February – Rugby league: 2012 NRL premiers the Melbourne Storm defeat Super League XVII champions the Leeds Rhinos 18–14 in the 2013 World Club Challenge, held in Leeds.
- 17 March – Motor racing: Kimi Räikkönen wins the 2013 Australian Grand Prix.
- 21 April – Soccer: Central Coast Mariners FC defeat Western Sydney Wanderers FC 2–0 in the 2013 A-League Grand Final.
- 19 April – In the 2013 ANZAC test Australia defeated New Zealand 32–12 at Canberra Stadium before a crowd of 25,628.
- 5 June – Rugby league: NSW Blues defeat Queensland Maroons 14–6 at ANZ Stadium in the first match of the 2013 State of Origin series. Blues second-rower Luke Lewis is awarded Man of the Match.
- 26 June – Rugby league: Queensland Maroons defeat NSW Blues 26–6 at Suncorp Stadium in the second match of the 2013 State of Origin series. Maroons hooker and captain Cameron Smith is awarded Man of the Match.
- 17 July – Rugby league: The Queensland Maroons win the 2013 State of Origin series, the team's eighth consecutive win, defeating the NSW Blues 12–10 at ANZ Stadium in the third match. Maroons winger Brent Tate is awarded Man of the Match, while hooker and captain Cameron Smith is awarded the Wally Lewis Medal for player of the series.
- 27 August – Australian rules football: The Australian Football League announces sanctions against the Essendon Football Club for the club's supplements controversy including being barred from the finals series, stripped of first and second round draft picks for the next two seasons, a $2 million fine and a one-year suspension of coach James Hird.
- 8 September – Rugby league: The Sydney Roosters win the minor premiership following the final main round of the 2013 NRL season. The Parramatta Eels finish in last position, claiming their second straight wooden spoon.
- 23 September – Australian rules football: Gary Ablett, Jr. (Gold Coast) wins his second Brownlow Medal.
- 28 September – Australian rules football: Hawthorn wins the 2013 AFL Grand Final, defeating Fremantle 11.11 (77) to 8.14 (62) at the MCG.
- October – The 12 World Solar Challenge is held.
- 6 October – Rugby league: The Sydney Roosters defeat the Manly Sea Eagles 26–18 in the 2013 NRL Grand Final. Sea Eagles halfback Daly Cherry-Evans is awarded the Clive Churchill Medal for man-of-the-match. Ricky Martin and Jessica Mauboy headline the pre-game entertainment.
- 5 November – Horse racing: Fiorente, ridden by jockey Damien Oliver, wins the 2013 Melbourne Cup.
- 17 December – Cricket: Australia regains The Ashes for the first time in seven years, after winning the first three tests of the 2013–14 Ashes series.
- 28 December – Yacht racing: Wild Oats XI takes line honours in the 2013 Sydney to Hobart Yacht Race, the yacht's seventh win.

== Deaths ==
=== January ===
- 2 January – Merv Hunter, 86, politician, New South Wales MLA for Lake Macquarie (1969–1991)
- 6 January – Paul Grundy, 77, civil engineer and academic
- 7 January – Nancy Burley, 82, figure skater
- 12 January – Norma Redpath, 84, artist
- 13 January – Bille Brown, 61, actor and playwright
- 14 January – Fred Flanagan, 88, VFL footballer (Geelong), Hall of Fame member (1998)
- 16 January – Sir Barry Holloway, 78, politician, Speaker of the National Parliament of Papua New Guinea (1972–1977)
- 18 January –
  - Peter Boyle, 61, footballer and manager
  - Jon Mannah, 23, rugby league player (Cronulla Sharks)
  - Lewis Marnell, 30, skateboarder
- 21 January – David Coe, 58, businessman
- 23 January – Jan Ormerod, 66, illustrator of children's books
- 24 January – Graeme Fellowes, 78, VFL footballer (Collingwood)
- 26 January – Patricia Lovell, 83, film producer
- 28 January – Brian Brown, 79, jazz musician
- 29 January – Ferris Ashton, 86, rugby league player (Eastern Suburbs)

=== February ===
- 6 February – Douglas Warren, 93, Roman Catholic prelate, Bishop of Wilcannia-Forbes (1967–1994)
- 8 February – Jack Dale Mengenen, 78, indigenous artist and painter
- 9 February – Colin Laverty, 75, doctor and art collector
- 11 February –
  - Vi Lloyd, 89, politician, member of the New South Wales Legislative Council (1973–1981)
  - Kevin Peek, 66, musician (Sky)
- 15 February – Bill Morrison, 84, politician, federal MP for St George (1969–1975, 1980–1984), Minister for Defence (1975)
- 22 February – Neil Mann, 88, VFL footballer and coach (Collingwood)
- 23 February – Joan Child, 91, politician, MP for Henty (1974–1975, 1980–1990), first female Speaker of House of Representatives (1986–1989)
- 25 February – Ray O'Connor, 86, Premier of Western Australia (1982–1983)
- 26 February – Bert Flugelman, 90, sculptor
- 28 February – Ajax, 42, DJ

=== March ===
- 2 March – Peter Harvey, 68, television journalist
- 3 March –
  - Col Firmin, 72, politician
  - James Strong, 68, CEO of Qantas (1993–2001)
- 10 March –
  - Brian Archer, 83, Senator for Tasmania (1975–1994)
  - John Chick, 80, footballer (Carlton)
- 13 March – Richard Davey, 74, actor and playwright
- 15 March – Leverne McDonnell, 49, actress
- 21 March –
  - Ernest Chapman, 86, Olympic rower
  - Tyrone Gilks, 19, motorbike stunt rider (born 1993)
  - Max Oldmeadow, 88, politician, MP for Holt (1972–1975)
  - Bruce Skeggs, 81, politician and trotting commentator
- 31 March – Ernie Bridge, 76, politician, Western Australia MLA for Kimberley (1980–2001)

=== April ===
- 2 April –
  - Linda Vogt, 90, flautist
  - Ian Wilson, 80, politician, MP for Sturt (1966–1969; 1972–1993)
- 4 April –
  - Chris Bailey, 62, musician (The Angels)
  - Tommy Tycho, 84, composer, arranger and orchestra conductor
  - Ian Walsh, 80, rugby league player (St. George Dragons) and Australian team Captain
- 8 April – Peter Reveen, 77, stage hypnotist and illusionist
- 11 April – David O'Halloran, 57, footballer (Hawthorn)
- 16 April – Murray Vernon, 76, cricketer (Western Australia)
- 19 April – Bill Knott, 92, politician, member of the New South Wales Legislative Assembly (1978–1986)
- 21 April –
  - Chrissy Amphlett, 53, musician (Divinyls; died in New York City)
  - William Edward Murray, 93, Roman Catholic prelate, Bishop of Wollongong (1975–1996)
- 22 April – Carmel Kaine, 75, violinist, co-founder/leader of Academy of St Martin in the Fields
- 25 April – Johnny Lockwood, 92, actor and performer
- 27 April – Joseph Peter O'Connell, 81, Roman Catholic prelate, Auxiliary Bishop of Melbourne (1976–2006)
- 28 April – Ron Baggott, 96, footballer (Melbourne)

=== May ===
- 1 May – Gregory Rogers, 55, children's author
- 3 May – Brad Drewett, 54, tennis player and administrator, ATP Executive Chairman (2012–2013)
- 5 May – Greg Quill, 66, roots musician and entertainment critic (Toronto Star)
- 10 May – Barbara Callcott, 66, actress
- 12 May – Doug Beasy, 83, footballer (Carlton)
- 13 May – Jill Kitson, 74, radio broadcaster and literary journalist
- 14 May – Joy Baluch, 80, politician, Mayor of Port Augusta (1981–1993, since 1995)
- 15 May –
  - Albert Lance, 87, opera singer
  - Billy Raymond, 75, television presenter and entertainer
- 17 May – Penne Hackforth-Jones, 63, actress
- 23 May –
  - Peter Ellis, 66, footballer (Fitzroy)
  - Hazel Hawke, 83, social activist, former wife of Prime Minister Bob Hawke
  - Gerry Peacocke, 81, politician, NSW MLA for Dubbo (1981–1999)
- 24 May – John Sumner, 88, founder and artistic director of Melbourne Theatre Company

=== June ===
- 1 June – Dorothy Napangardi, 60s, indigenous artist
- 2 June – Yunupingu, 56, musician (Yothu Yindi)
- 7 June – Harvey Dunn, Jr., 81, footballer (Carlton)
- 9 June – Christopher Pearson, 61, journalist, political speech-writer, founder of the Adelaide Review
- 14 June – Betty Burstall, 87, theatre director, founder of La Mama Theatre
- 15 June –
  - Helen Hughes, 84, economist
  - Dennis O'Rourke, 67, documentary film maker
  - Syd Young, 95, footballer (South Melbourne)
- 18 June – Jean Melzer, 87, politician, Senator for Victoria (1974–1981)
- 19 June –
  - Michael Hodgman, 74, Tasmanian politician
  - Paul Mees, 52, academic and lawyer
- 20 June –
  - Beril Jents, 95, fashion designer
  - Jeffrey Smart, 91, painter
- 21 June – Wendy Saddington, 64, jazz and blues singer (Chain)
- 22 June – Cameron Baird, 32, soldier, Victoria Cross for Australia recipient (died in Afghanistan)
- 28 June –
  - Peter Lehmann, 82, winemaker
  - Kenneth Minogue, 83, academic and political scientist

=== July ===
- 1 July – Gary Shearston, 74, singer and songwriter
- 5 July –
  - Paul Couvret, 91, politician and military veteran
  - Gwyn Hanssen Pigott, 77, ceramicist
- 16 July – Don McIntyre, 98, footballer (Carlton)
- 19 July – Alan Hunt, 85, politician, member of the Victorian Legislative Council (1961–1992)
- 21 July – Irene Gleeson, 68, humanitarian
- 23 July – Mike Morwood, 62, archaeologist, discoverer of the Flores hobbit
- 26 July – Mike Shipley, 56, Grammy Award-winning sound engineer and music producer (Def Leppard)
- 27 July – Nick Evers, 75, politician, Tasmanian MHA for Franklin (1986–1990)
- 28 July –
  - Graham Murray, 58, rugby league player (Parramatta Eels and South Sydney) and coach
  - Ray Strauss, 85, cricketer (Western Australia)
- 29 July – Tony Gaze, 93, military officer, RAF World War II flying ace and Grand Prix race car driver

=== August ===
- 1 August – John Dengate, 74, folk singer and songwriter
- 4 August – Billy Ward, 20, Olympic boxer (born 1993)
- 6 August – John Kingsmill, 92, author and actor
- 8 August – Ios Teper, 98, Soviet military officer, awarded Order of the Red Banner for Battle of Berlin
- 9 August – Brian Moll, 88, actor (A Country Practice, Street Fighter)
- 10 August – Jonathan Dawson, 71, film maker, critic and historian
- 13 August – Bob Bignall, 91, Olympic soccer player (1956)
- 16 August – John Munro, 84, cricketer (Western Australia) and footballer (Claremont)
- 17 August – Jim Clark, 88, VFL footballer (Carlton)
- 19 August – Noel Pidding, 86, rugby league player (St George Dragons)
- 22 August – Jim Ramsay, 83, politician, Victorian MLA for Balwyn (1973–1988)
- 23 August – John Mainstone, 78, physics professor
- 27 August –
  - Maxwell Fuller, 68, chess master
  - Chris Kennedy, 64, film director (Doing Time for Patsy Cline, A Man's Gotta Do)
  - Bill Peach, 78, television journalist (This Day Tonight)
- 28 August – Matt Doust, 29, artist (died in Los Angeles)
- 31 August – William John Brennan, 75, Roman Catholic prelate, Bishop of Wagga Wagga (1984–2002)

=== September ===
- 1 September – Gordon Steege, 95, military officer, RAAF flying ace
- 3 September – Lewis Morley, 88, photographer (Christine Keeler, Joe Orton)
- 4 September – Sir Arthur George, 98, association football administrator
- 7 September – Frank Blevins, 74, politician, Deputy Premier of South Australia (1992–1993)
- 11 September – Keith Dunstan, 88, journalist and author
- 14 September – Faith Leech, 72, Olympic champion freestyle swimmer (1956)
- 15 September – Joyce Jacobs, 91, actress (A Country Practice)
- 17 September –
  - Ted Connelly, 94, politician, Speaker of the South Australian House of Assembly (1975–1977)
  - Bernie McGann, 76, jazz saxophonist
- 18 September –
  - Allyson McConnell, 34, convicted killer who drowned her two children in Alberta, Canada
  - Dame Monica Gallagher, 90, community worker and church activist
- 20 September – Ron Richards, 85, VFL footballer (Collingwood)
- 23 September –
  - Anthony Hawkins, 80, actor (Special Squad)
  - John Hipwell, 65, rugby union player and national team captain
  - Rex Hobcroft, 88, pianist, conductor, composer and music administrator
  - Christopher Koch, 81, novelist (The Year of Living Dangerously)
- 24 September – Margaret Feilman, 92, town planner and architect.
- 29 September – Michael Maher, 77, politician, MP for Lowe (1982–1987)
- 30 September –
  - John Hopkins, 86, conductor and administrator
  - Janet Powell, 71, politician, Senator for Victoria and Leader of the Australian Democrats (1990–1991)

=== October ===
- 1 October – Rosemary Adey, 80, softballer
- 7 October –
  - Basil Dickinson, 98, Olympic athlete (1936)
  - Bruce McPherson, 77, Queensland Supreme Court judge
- 9 October – Chopper Read, 58, crime figure and author
- 13 October – David Thomson, 88, politician, member of the House of Representatives (1975–1983)
- 15 October –
  - Sean Edwards, 26, English professional racing driver (died in Queensland)
  - Nevill Drury, 66, author and publisher
- 16 October –
  - Charles Halton, 81, mathematician and civil servant
  - Laurel Martyn, 97, ballerina and choreographer
- 20 October – Bruce Beeby, 91, actor
- 23 October – Anthony Joseph Burgess, 75, Roman Catholic prelate, Bishop of Wewak (2002–2013)
- 27 October –
  - Basil Hennessy, 88, archaeologist
  - Albie Thomas, 78, Olympic runner (1956, 1960 and 1964)
- 28 October –
  - Troy Clarke, 44, Australian rules footballer (Brisbane)
  - Marea Gazzard, 85, sculptor and ceramicist

=== November ===
- 3 November –
  - Rupert Gerritsen, 60, historian
  - Leonard Long, 102, landscape painter
- 7 November – Ian Davies, 57, Olympic (1980 and 1984) and Hall of Fame basketballer
- 10 November – John Grant, 91, neurosurgeon and disability sport administrator
- 19 November –
  - Gunter Christmann, 77, painter
  - Joan Gardner, 95, microbiologist
- 25 November – Elke Neidhardt, 72, opera director (Ring cycles) and actress (Skippy the Bush Kangaroo)

=== December ===
- 1 December – Martin Sharp, 71, artist
- 2 December – John Ewbank, 64, rock climber
- 4 December – Robert Allman, 86, opera singer
- 8 December – Sir John Cornforth, 96, chemist, laureate of the Nobel Prize in Chemistry (1975) (died in England)
- 10 December –
  - Mary Allitt, 80, cricketer
  - Alan Coleman, 76, television director and producer (The Young Doctors, Neighbours)
- 11 December – Frederick Fox, 82, milliner
- 13 December – Andrew Plain, sound editor
- 14 December – Neil Robson, 85, politician
- 22 December – Keith McGowan, 70, radio presenter

== See also ==
- 2013 in Australian literature
- 2013 in Australian television
- List of Australian films of 2013
