= Tunnel Bend diversion tunnel =

Goulburn River diversion tunnel in Australia

Coordinates: 37°22′53″S 146°13′18″E

The Tunnel Bend diversion tunnel is located at Tunnel Bend, on the Goulburn River, approximately 15 km north of Gaffneys Creek, Victoria, Australia.

The tunnel is approximately 3 metres wide and 2 metres high and 200 metres long through stable rock. It is dry during periods of low river flow, and appears quite safe to walk through. The tunnel was constructed by the Goulburn Valley Sluicing Co. in 1866, during the Victorian gold rush, to divert the river flow and enable the working of the bed for alluvial gold. Floods the following year 'injured' the company's works. They planned to rebuild and resume operations when the flooding subsided, but there is no evidence that this happened.

The site is listed in the Victorian Heritage Inventory.
