= Sydney Young =

Sydney Young may refer to:

- Syd Young (1918–2013), Australian rules footballer
- Sydney Young (chemist) (1857–1937), English chemist
