= 2006–07 Australian bushfire season =

Australian bushfire

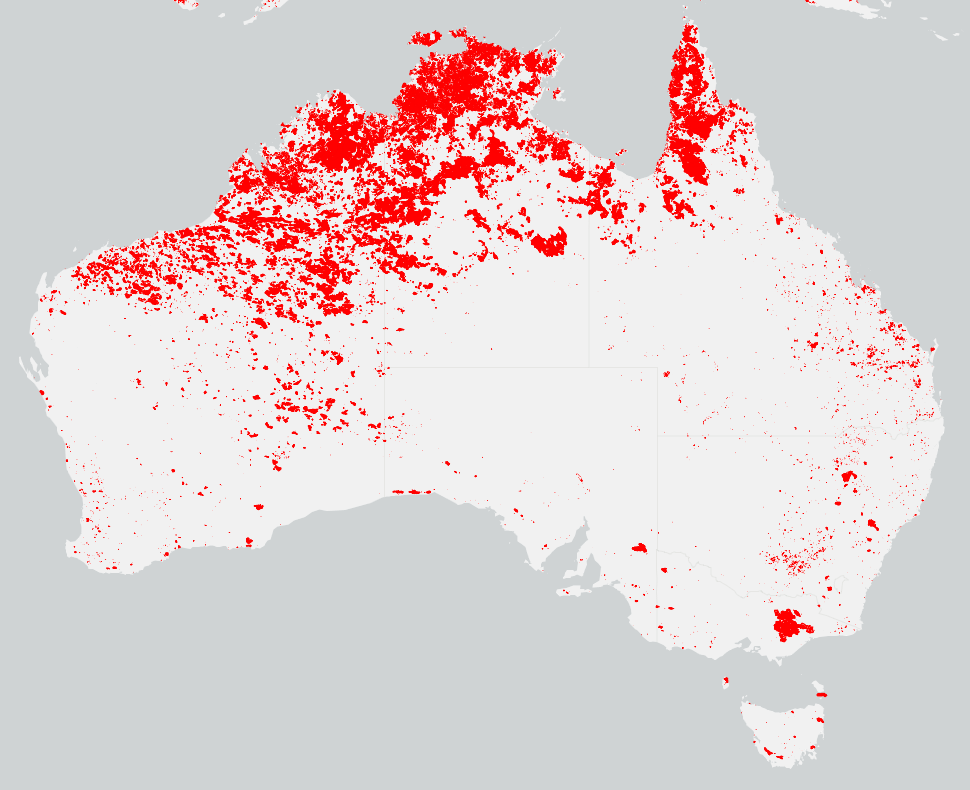
- NASA MODIS burned area detections from June 2006 to May 2007
- Date: Winter 2006 – autumn 2007 (southern hemisphere)
- Location: Australia

Statistics
- Burned area: >1,360,000 ha (3,400,000 acres)

Impacts
- Deaths: 5 total: 1 Forestry Tasmania employee; 4 other
- Injuries: 1,400
- Structures destroyed: 100+ total: 83 houses; Numerous non-residential structures

Ignition
- Cause: Various

The 2006–07 bushfire season was one of the most extensive bushfire seasons in Australia's history. Victoria experienced the longest continuously burning bushfire complex in Australia's history, with fires in the Victorian Alps and Gippsland burning over 1 million hectares of land over the course of 69 days. See Bushfires in Australia for an explanation of regional seasons.

The 2006–07 season included the Victorian Alpine Fire Complex which was the longest running collection of bushfires in Victoria's history. On 1 December 2006, more than 70 fires were caused by lightning strikes in the Victorian Alps, many of which eventually merged to become the Great Divide Complex, which burned for 69 days across about a million hectares.

Despite the length of the season and amount of land burnt, the fires were contained to mostly unoccupied regions such as the Victorian Alps, national parks and remnant bushland. Evacuation plans were implemented in many small towns in these areas, a combination of these factors resulted in only one fatality as a result of the fires.

== Timeline ==
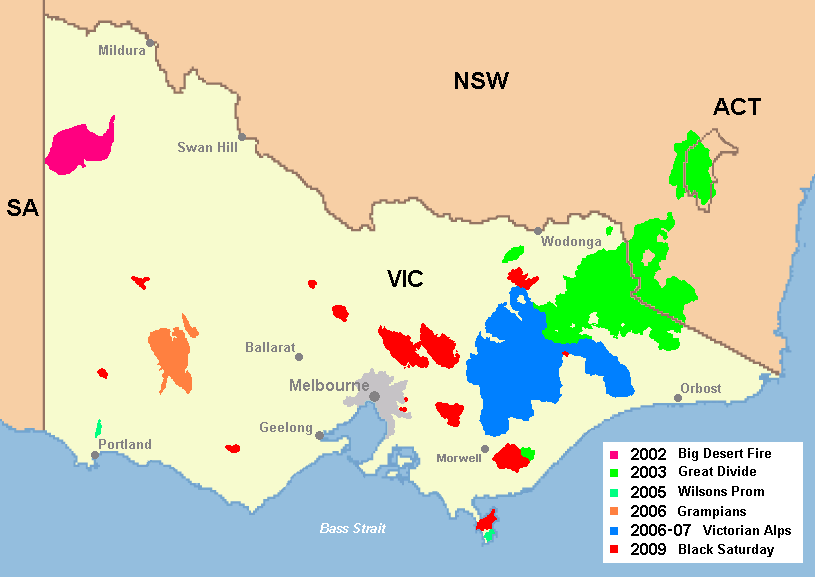
Major bushfires in Victoria in the 2000s, showing the 2006–07 fires in blue

=== January 2006 ===
Three deaths and multimillion-dollar livestock and property losses in ten days of bushfires in Victoria. Fires occurred in the Stawell (Deep Lead) area in early January, and in the Yea, Moondarra, Grampians, Kinglake and Anakie regions in mid-late January.

=== September 2006 ===
On 24 September 2006, bushfires began burning in various places in the Southern Highlands, Shoalhaven, Hawkesbury River and Hunter regions of New South Wales, Australia.

Declarations under Section 44 of the Rural Fires Act, 1997 were issued by the New South Wales Rural Fire Service for the Newcastle, Hawkesbury/Baulkham, Redhead (Lake Macquarie), Shoalhaven and Wollondilly bushfires, enabling the "Commissioner is to take charge of bush fire fighting operations and bush fire prevention measures and to take such measures as the Commissioner considers necessary to control or suppress any bush fire in any part of the State...." Seven (7) houses were burned out, four at Picton, and also Thirlmere, and Oakdale. The wind was from the west and north-west and fed the fire conditions, hampering firefighting by the New South Wales Rural Fire Service.

=== October 2006 ===
On 12 October 2006, bushfires burned through parts of Hobart's eastern shore, encouraged by strong winds and unusually high temperatures. No lives or homes were lost.

=== November 2006 ===
In late November Sydney was covered in smoke after raging fires in the Blue Mountains. One of the major fires was lit by a lightning strike near Burra Korain Head inside the Blue Mountains National Park on 13 November. Some people have suggested that the Blue Gum Forest in the Grose River valley was severely damaged by backburning, though this remains to be ascertained scientifically.

On 28 November 2006, lightning strikes started 15 fires in the Riverina with the major fires west of Narrandera at Morundah and Tubbo Station were about 10 km^{2} of private property was burnt and Northeast of Narrandera at Colinroobie Ranges over 12 km^{2} of private property and bush land was burnt.

Large bushfires burnt across the Pilbara for over a week forcing the closure of Karijini National Park. Over 150,000 hectares (370,658 acres) were burned out close to the National Park, the Auski Roadhouse and around Mulga Downs Station.

=== December 2006 ===
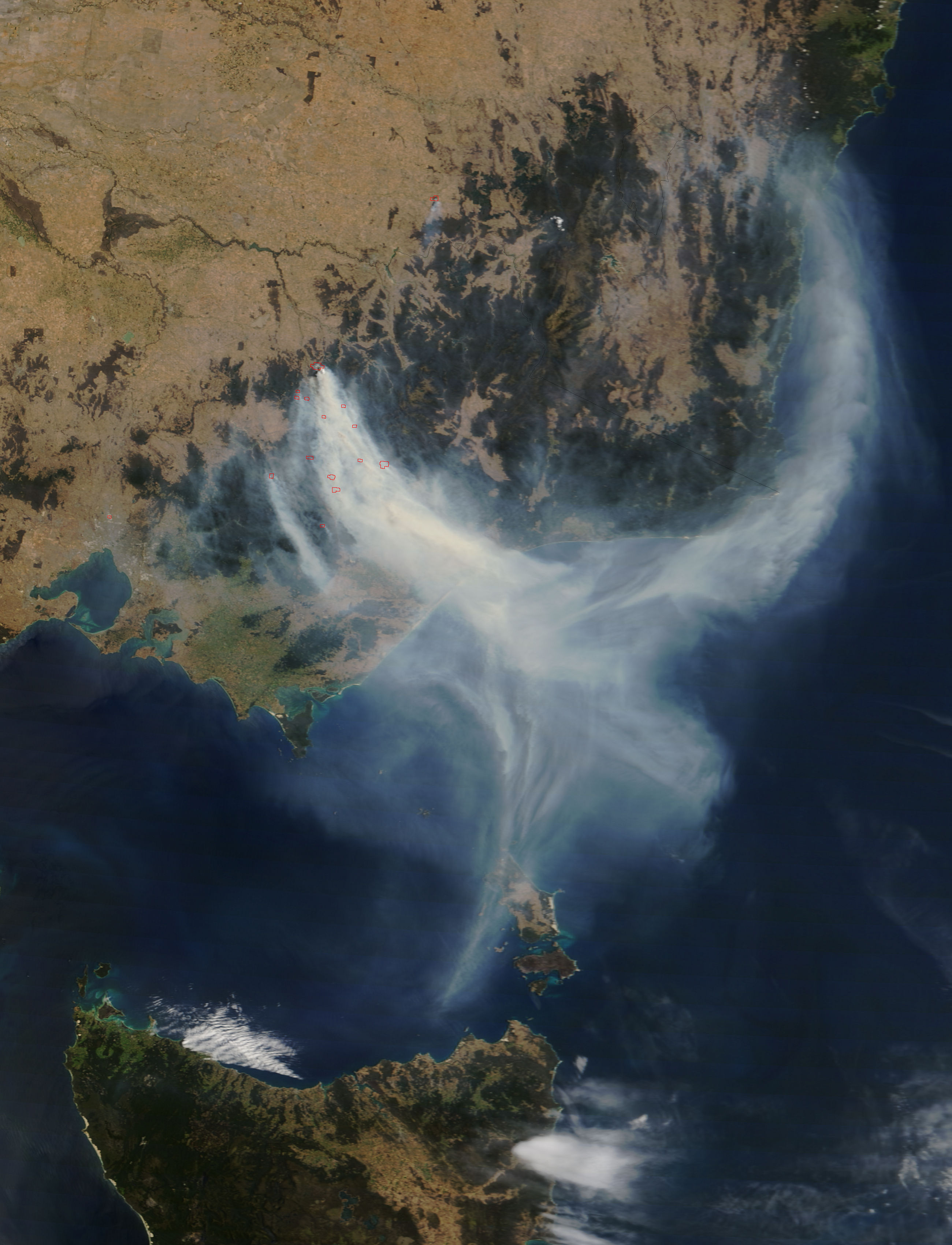
Satellite image of smoke from fires in the Victorian Alps and Gippsland, 8 December 2006

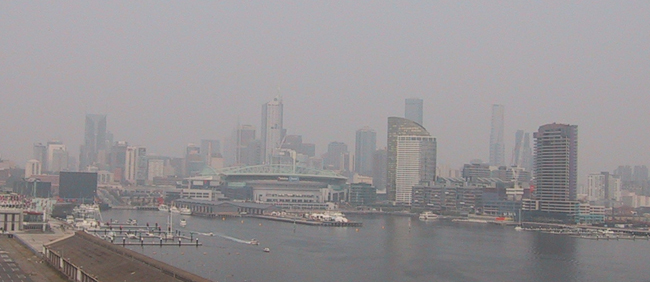
The city of Melbourne swathed in smoke during the 2006–2007 bushfire season

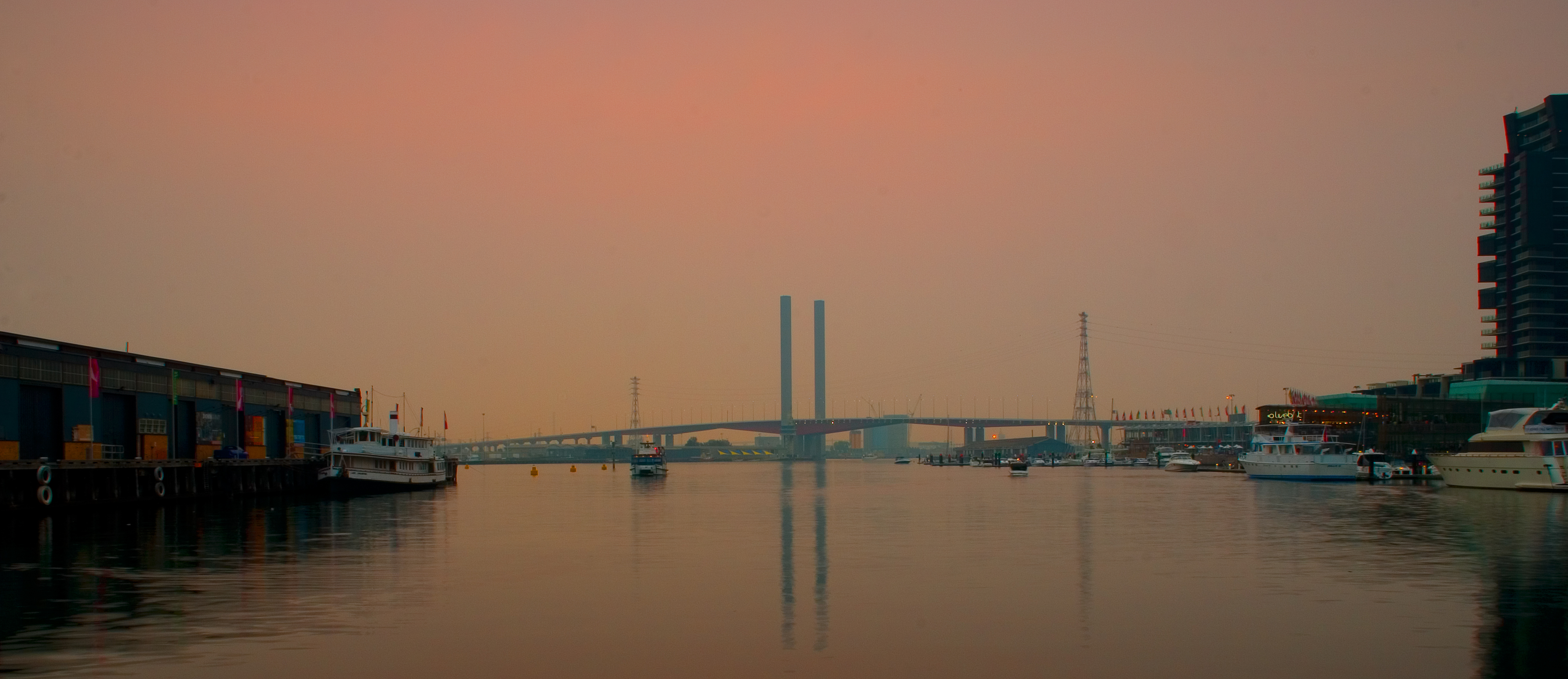
The Bolte Bridge surrounded by a thick sky during the bushfires. This photograph was taken in late afternoon.

On 1 December 2006, over 70 fires were caused by lightning strikes in the Victorian Alps, many of which eventually merged to become the Great Divide Fire Complex, which burned from December 2006 to February 2007 (69 days) across approximately 1 million hectares. Fifty-one houses were ultimately lost in the fires. One man died in a vehicle accident while assisting a property owner to prepare for fire impact.

By 7 February, more than 1,400 firefighters had been injured (including bruises, cuts, blisters, burns, dehydration, broken limbs and spider bites). More than 400 St John Ambulance volunteers, including doctors, nurses and first aid officers provided first aid. On 16 December, eleven New Zealand firefighters were injured while fighting the fire in the Howqua Valley in north-east Victoria.

On the week end of 9 and 10 December, 3,000 firefighters fought the blazes. Settlements at Gaffneys Creek, A1 Mine Settlement, Burns Bridge, Mount Beauty, Bright, Wandiligong and Tawonga were threatened with the fires. On 11 December 4,000 firefighters fought 13 blazes. The fire has destroyed Craig's Hut, an alpine hut that featured in the film The Man from Snowy River. In Gippsland on 14 December, eighteen homes were destroyed in the Heyfield–Walhalla area in blazes believed to have been deliberately lit. A 48-year-old man was killed falling off the back of a trailer while fighting the Gippsland fires.

In South Australia, nearly 1,200 km^{2} was burnt at Bookmark, near Waikerie in South Australia's Riverland region.

In Tasmania, fires burnt at St Marys on the east coast, Zeehan in the west and in the state's south at Bream Creek and Deep Bay. Fires destroyed at least 18 houses near Scamander where in excess of 175 km^{2} were burnt. A further four homes were lost at Four Mile Creek on 14 December.

In New South Wales, a fire near Tumut has burned over 130 km^{2} of pine plantation in the Bondo, Billapaloola and Buccleuch State Forests.

On 3 December, up to 4,000 people were evacuated from Whiteman Park near Perth after a bushfire burnt through about 1 km^{2} of the park.

On 12 December, a man in Western Australia was charged with lighting a fire in the Perth Hills. A home in Kalamunda was completely gutted and several were damaged by flying embers.

=== January 2007 ===
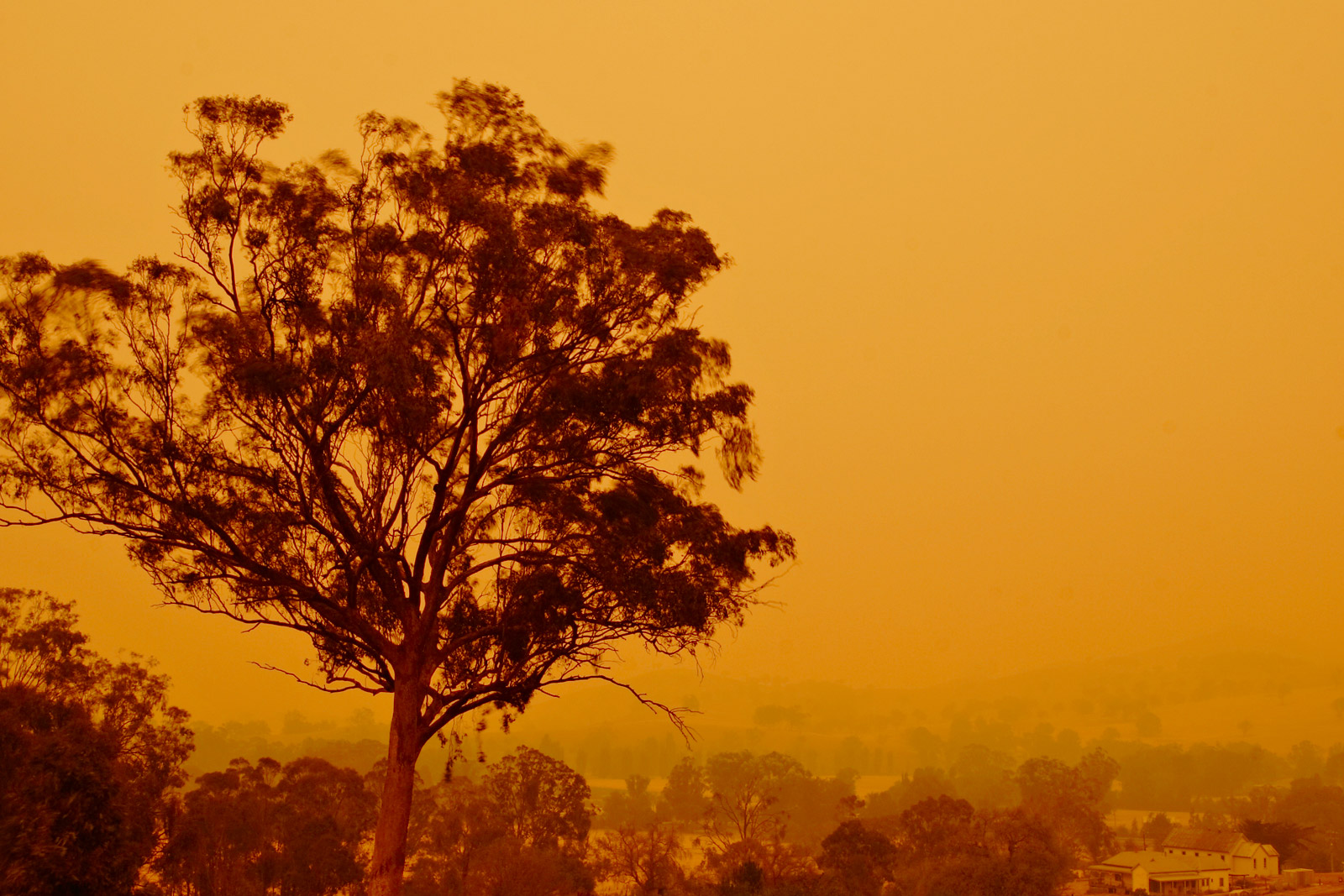
Looking towards Swifts Creek, 14 December 2006 at 4:00 pm daylight saving time

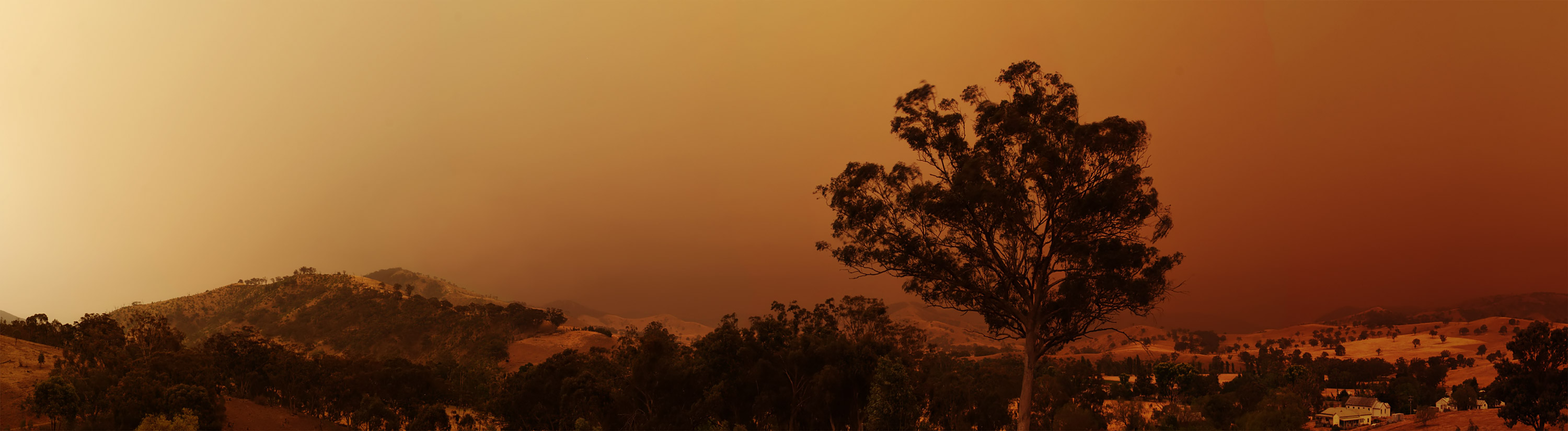
Looking towards Swifts Creek, 14 December 2006 at 4:00 pm daylight saving time

In January 2007, several new bushfires were burning in the Gippsland region of Victoria. By 18 January, the fires had been burning across Victoria for 48 days and over 10,000 km^{2} had been burnt. Homes and other property and stock was lost.

There was a significant fire in the Adelaide Hills of South Australia, near the towns of Kangarilla and Echunga, the Mount Bold Reservoir, and in parts of Kuitpo Forest. See : Mount Bold Fire.

An arsonist lit at least thirteen fires in the eastern hills near Harrogate, but most were contained with minimal damage to property.

On the 16th a bushfire burning out of control near the town of Benalla in Victoria's North East caused power to be cut to much of the state when ash and smoke severed major transmission powerlines connecting Victoria to the national power grid. The 40 °C temperature caused a huge demand for power which, when paired with the severing of the line, forced power company's to impose rolling blackouts across the state, including power loss to parts of Melbourne which resulted in traffic problems across the city. Full power was restored at approximately 12:30 am the following day.

On 17 January, fires crossed the Murray River into New South Wales and threatened Thredbo. With the fire 12 km from the town, 700 tourists were evacuated.

On 21 January, a large fire began near the F3 Freeway (Freeway which connects Central Coast to Sydney), this resulted in its closure due to the intensity of the flames and smoke levels.

On 22 January, the fire broke containment lines and headed north thanks to wind levels and hot conditions, the fire also caused the closure of the Pacific Highway and train line. The suburb of Berowra also came under direct threat with residents urged at the time to prepare their properties. The railway station and a train that had stopped there came perilously close to being consumed by the bushfire. Later on 22 January, the fire front was slowly contained, allowing all three avenues to re-open by nightfall.

=== February 2007 ===
By the morning of 7 February, the fire complex in eastern Victoria was declared contained. Lasting 69 days and having merged to burn a total of 1,154,828 hectares, the bushfires were the longest in Victoria's history.

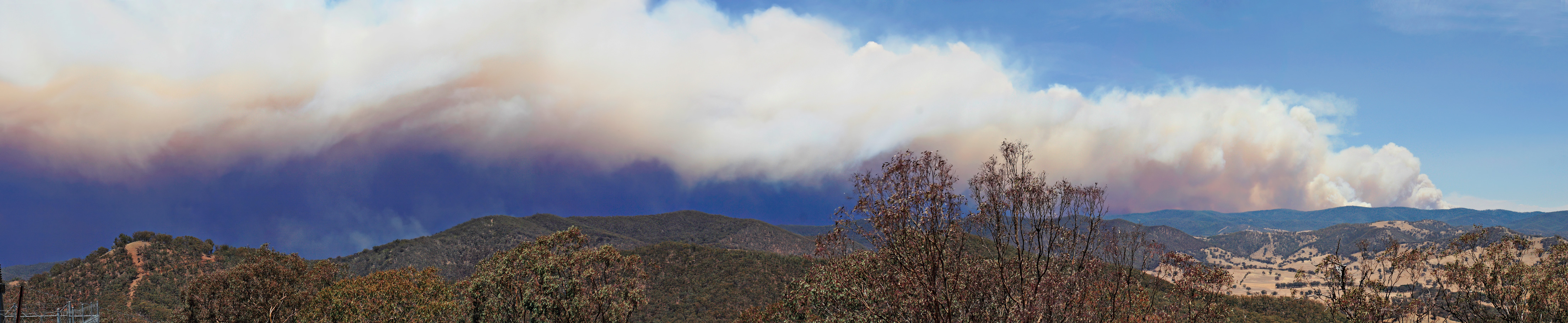
Looking towards Dargo from Swifts Creek, 11 January 2007

== Fires of note ==
State	Start date	Deaths	Injuries	Houses lost	Area (ha)	Local govt.	Impacted communities & destruction	Duration	Ref.
NSW	24 September 2006			4	1,200 ha (3,000 acres)	Wollondilly	Thirlmere & Oakdale	2 days	
NSW	24 September 2006			2	600 ha (1,500 acres)	Hawkesbury	Cattai: Shed, boats destroyed	2 days	
NSW	21 November 2006	1			10 ha (25 acres)	Eurobodalla	near Nelligen: A civilian perishes		
VIC	6 December 2006		11	21	1,300,000 ha (3,200,000 acres)	Mansfield	Upper Edi, Tolmie, Rose River, Kevington, Bocking, Gaffney's Creek & A1 Mine: A large ski lodge, a school camp, several cabins, historic home and 20 vehicles destroyed	62 days	
TAS	10 December 2006	1	1	26	17,500 ha (43,000 acres)	Break O'Day & Sorell	Scamander, St. Marys & St Helens: A Forestry Tasmania employee perishes; A restaurant, a berry farm, an art gallery, a jeweller's shop, an electrical business, 24 workshops, a caravan and around 90 vehicles (including 70 in a wrecking yard) destroyed	5 days	
VIC	14 December 2006	1		12	7,000 ha (17,000 acres)	Wellington	Toongabbie, Seaton & Cowwarr: A civilian perishes; Dozens of non-residential structures, several vehicles, a nursery and community hall destroyed		
WA	16 December 2006			14	14,000 ha (35,000 acres)	Murray	Dwellingup & Coolup: 20 vehicles, dozens of items of machinery and outbuildings destroyed; 4 houses damaged	57 days	
VIC	16 January 2007			3	34,000 ha (84,000 acres)	Mansfield	Archerton, Tatong & Toombullup: Significant livestock loss		
SA	17 January 2007	1		1	15 ha (37 acres)	Onkaparinga	Willunga: A civilian perishes		
WA	3 February 2007	1				Toodyay	Toodyay: A civilian perishes; Several non-residential structures and vehicles destroyed		
