= One Way Ticket (1997 film) =

1997 Australian television film

- Written by: Karin Altmann; Michael Brindley
- Directed by: Richard Franklin
- Starring: Peter Phelps; Rachel Blakely; Chris Haywood
- Music by: Nerida Tyson-Chew
- Country of origin: Australia
- Original language: English

Production
- Executive producers: Andrew Brooke; Kris Noble
- Producer: Ian Bradley
- Cinematography: Ellery Ryan
- Editor: David Pulbrook
- Running time: 97 minutes
- Production companies: Grundy Television Productions; Nine Network Australia

Original release
- Release: 1997

One Way Ticket is a 1997 Australian made-for-television drama film directed by Richard Franklin. The film was inspired by real events in the life of prison officer Heather Parker, who assisted in the escape of Peter Gibb and Archie Butterly.

== Plot ==
A criminal languishing in jail embarks on a torrid affair with a female guard. However, events take a sinister turn as she becomes increasingly besotted, and news of their romance becomes public – leading to the collapse of her marriage. Desperate, she agrees to help the crook escape, only to start doubting his commitment.

== Cast ==
- Peter Phelps as Mick Webb
- Rachel Blakely as Deborah Carter
- Chris Haywood as Bertie
- Jane Hall as Kate Stark
- Joseph Spano as Kaiser
- Adriano Cortese as Tumeo
- Russell Fletcher as Geoff
- Marie-Louise Jolicoeur as Maureen
- Samuel Johnson as Jimmie
- Doug Bowles as Preece
- Regina Gaigalas as Lena
- Richard E. Young as Louis
- Sally Lightfoot as Pam
- Dennis Miller as Alf
- Elspeth Ballantyne as Elizabeth
- Richard Moir as Governor
- Frank Gallacher as Macca
- Troy Rowley as Mouse
- Terry Gill as Buddle
- Elly Varrenti as Mags

== Production ==
Some filming took place at St. Andrews Hotel, St. Andrews, Victoria, Australia.
