= HM Melbourne Assessment Prison =

Remand and reception prison in Melbourne, Australia

Melbourne Assessment Prison
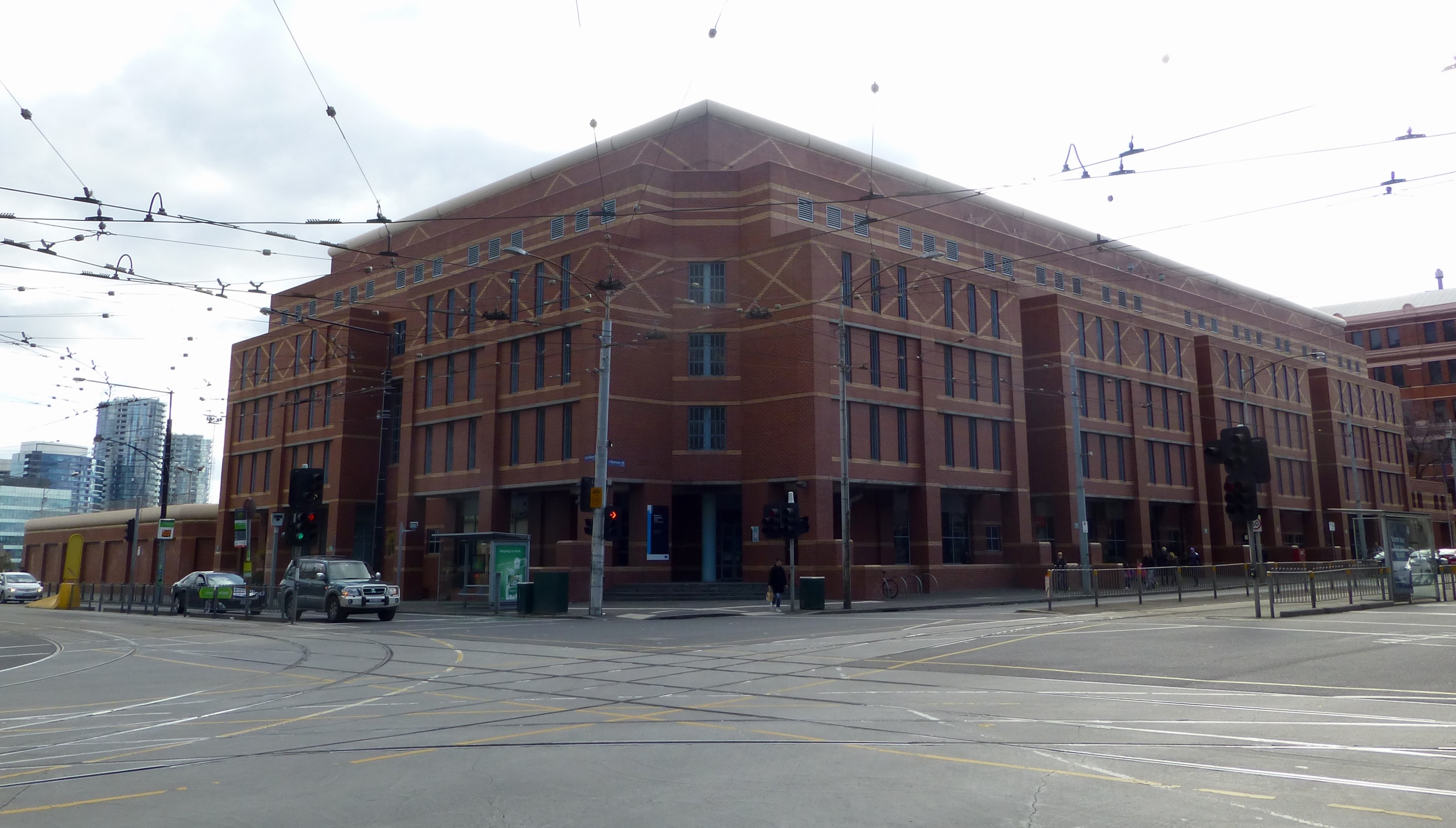
- Interactive map of Melbourne Assessment Prison
- Location: West Melbourne, Victoria; 37°48′46″S 144°57′2″E
- Status: Operational
- Security class: Maximum; males only
- Capacity: 305 (as at 30 June 2017)
- Opened: 6 April 1989
- Managed by: Corrections Victoria

The Melbourne Assessment Prison (MAP) is an Australian remand and reception prison located in Spencer Street, West Melbourne, Victoria. The facility is operated by Corrections Victoria.

== Function and history ==
The prison is also known by the nickname 'The Map'. Previously known as the Melbourne Remand Centre, the Melbourne Assessment Prison was originally built to accommodate Melbourne's remand prisoners and sits on the site of the former Western Hotel on the corner of Spencer Street and La Trobe Street just west of the Melbourne central business district.

The primary purpose of the facility is to provide statewide assessment and orientation services for all male prisoners received into the prison system.

In 1997, the prison became the main reception prison for all male prisoners in Victoria. Initial planning for the prison commenced in 1974. Construction commenced in December 1983 and was completed in 1989 at a cost of A$80m. The prison was officially opened on 6 April 1989, and received its first prisoners on 29 May 1989.

At least two prisoners have escaped from the Melbourne Assessment Prison. In one incident explosives smuggled into the unit were used to blow open the armoured plastic windows of a cell, while the two inmates hid behind mattresses (see Peter Gibb). Since then steel bars have been added to the windows to prevent a repetition.

The prison has seen a small expansion of its capacity over the years and as of June 2017 it held 305 prisoners.

== Notable prisoners ==
- Gregory Brazel
- Lester Ellis
- Peter Gibb
- Peter James Knight
- Cardinal George Pell

== See also ==
- List of prisons in Victoria
