= Peter Ellis (footballer) =

Australian rules footballer

Personal information
- Full name: Peter Graeme Ellis
- Born: 4 March 1947
- Died: 21 May 2013 (aged 66)
- Original team: Mayne
- Height: 203 cm (6 ft 8 in)
- Weight: 105 kg (231 lb)

Playing career^{1}
Years	Club	Games (Goals)
1969–1971	Fitzroy	7 (0)
- ^{1} Playing statistics correct to the end of 1971.

Peter Graeme Ellis (4 March 1947 – 21 May 2013) was an Australian rules footballer who played with Fitzroy in the Victorian Football League (VFL).

Ellis started his career at Queensland club Mayne. He represented his state in 1966 and 1967.

A ruckman, he played for Fitzroy from 1969 to 1971, but managed just seven senior appearances.

He then joined Subiaco in the Western Australian National Football League and would go on to play 88 games for the club. In 1979 he represented Queensland again, at the Perth State of Origin Carnival.
