= Daniel Alfred Yock =

Aboriginal Australian dancer (1975–1993)

Daniel Yock
- Born: 7 February 1975; Cherbourg, Queensland, Australia
- Died: 7 November 1993 (aged 18); Brisbane, Queensland, Australia
- Other name: Boonie
- Occupation: dancer
- Known for: Helping establish the Wakka Wakka Dance Company
- Family: Lionel Fogarty (brother)

Daniel Alfred Yock (7 February 1975 – 7 November 1993) was an Aboriginal Australian dancer and amateur boxer who died shortly after being arrested by officers from the Queensland Police Service.

As an Aboriginal death in custody so soon after the Royal Commission into Aboriginal Deaths in Custody, Yock's death caused widespread anger and protests from the Australian Aboriginal community.

== Early life ==
Yock was born on 7 February 1975 at the Cherbourg Aboriginal Settlement where he grew up. He went to Cherbourg State School before attending Murgon State High School in Murgon.

Searching for better employment prospects, Yock left Murgon in 1991 and relocated to Brisbane before returning home and then going back to Brisbane. Although occasionally staying at a hostel, Yock struggled to find somewhere more permanent to live. Yock and his friends formed a dancing troupe called the Wakka Wakka Dance Company.

Though only earning a paltry sum, they would perform regularly at local festivals and schools.

== Death ==
Yock's death occurred on 7 November 1993, shortly after being arrested by police for disorderly conduct.

He had been drinking with friends at Musgrave Park in South Brisbane when a police van from the West End police station began surveillance on the group of men, after which two more police vehicles arrived. Feeling threatened, the group of men ran from the park prompting the police to engage in a pursuit on foot.

While attempting to outrun the police, Yock collided with a sergeant in Brereton Street. Eyewitnesses living nearby claim Yock fell hard and for a time lay motionless on the ground as he had been winded while police officers claim he was conscious and able to walk after the collision. Yock was arrested for disorderly conduct and placed in handcuffs before being put into the back of a police van with his friend Joseph Blair who had also been arrested.

Noticing Yock's condition deteriorating as they were being transported to the watchhouse, Blair attempted to call for help. The police officers in the cab later claimed in the ensuing judicial inquiry that they didn't hear Blair's cries for attention.

By the time they reached the police station in Roma Street, Yock had stopped breathing and had no pulse. Finally realising the seriousness of the situation, police officers struggled to find the keys to get the Yock's handcuffs removed before attempting to resuscitate him. An ambulance was called and Yock was rushed the Royal Brisbane Hospital. Half an hour after the ambulance arrived at the hospital, Yock was pronounced dead at 7:13pm - 75 minutes after he had been arrested.

Yock's funeral was held on 16 November 1993 in Cherbourg.

An autopsy was conducted by a Queensland Government pathologist who found Yock's death was caused by Ischaemic heart disease and the narrowing of the arteries with a significant impairment of the right coronary artery detected. An amount of cannabis and a high blood alcohol content was also detected in Yock's body.

It was also reported that Yock had experienced a number of fainting spells in the past including one that had been recorded on video during one of his boxing matches. A cardiologist also suggested Yock may have had Stokes-Adams syndrome which could have contributed to his death.

== Reaction ==
Queensland premier Wayne Goss said the circumstances surrounding Yock being arrested, placed in a police van, and then being found dead would raise serious questions in the mind of any reasonable person. However, Deputy Commissioner Greg Early said the four officers involved in Yock's arrest would not be suspended from duty but they had been given orders not to deal with the Aboriginal community until the issue was resolved.

Brisbane's Murri community reacted angrily to the news of Yock's death. At approximately midday on 8 November 1993, around 250 Aboriginal protesters marched on the Queensland Police Service headquarters in Roma Street, prompting the police to form a human barricade around the front of the building. Several people were injured including five protesters and at least four police officers. A violent brawl between protesters and white youths also occurred in the carpark of the Roma Street Transit Centre opposite the police headquarters. The violence prompted Aboriginal elders to appeal for calm.

On 17 November 1993, a peaceful protest was held with protesters retracing the route Yock took in the back of the police van from Musgrave Park, across Victoria Bridge, through the Brisbane CBD and to the watchhouse at the Roma Street police station. Protest rallies were also held elsewhere, including Sydney and Melbourne.

Questions were raised about various issues pertaining to how the Queensland Police Service dealt with Aboriginal people, including unwarranted surveillance, racial profiling and stop and searches.

== Inquiries ==
An inquiry was held by the Criminal Justice Commission, chaired by Lewis Wyvill QC. A 103-page report was handed down on 5 April 1994. It found that Yock's arrest was lawful and that the response by the Queensland Police Service was appropriate, clearing the police officers of any wrongdoing. It also found the arrest was not racially motivated. It concluded Yock died from an Stokes-Adams syndrome attack complicated by Ischaemic heart disease and drug intoxication. Wyvill did make a number of recommendations including the introduction of a way for police officers to communicate with prisoners being transported in vans, reviewing handcuffing procedures and assessing the condition of prisoners at various intervals following their arrest.

Premier Wayne Goss requested an apology from those who had made allegations of police brutality and called on Aboriginal leaders to ensure that the wider Aboriginal community accepted the findings. Also calling for an apology, police minister Paul Braddy stated: "They want a culture whereby anyone who's Aboriginal who dies in police custody, somehow it must be the fault of the police. The report is very clear and the medical evidence is very clear and puts it beyond doubt: there was no police assault, no police brutality." Similarly, Queensland police commissioner Jim O'Sullivan accused Aboriginal people of being "hell bent" on using Yock's death to incite tensions with the police.

The vice-president of the Aboriginal Legal Service Sam Watson rejected the calls for an apology stating that it would be comparable to asking Jewish people to apologise for Auschwitz. Yock's brother Lionel Fogarty repeated his earlier calls for the six police officers involved in the arrest to be charged with murder and manslaughter, claiming justice would not have been done until the officers faced court and then imprisoned.

On 30 September 1994, Fogarty filed a lawsuit against the Goss government and police commissioner Jim O'Sullivan claiming an unspecified amount of money for damages for post-traumatic stress disorder and a depressive illness which occurred following his brother's death.

Aboriginal representatives called for a national day of action on 20 April 1994.

The Socialist Labour League also held a "Worker's Inquiry" into Yock's death. During that inquiry, a medical practitioner testified that it was "highly improbable" that he had died from a Stokes-Adams attack. That inquiry concluded that he had been unconscious because of the way he had been treated by the police. It found all six police officers involved in Yock's arrest to be directly responsible for his death. The findings of the Worker's Inquiry were not acted upon by the authorities.

== Legacy ==
After witnessing Yock's death in the back of the police van, Joseph Blair was deeply affected. In the years since Yock's death, Blair has suffered from nightmares, panic attacks and a fear of the police. He moved to the Central Queensland Aboriginal community of Woorabinda in an attempt to escape what had occurred in Brisbane. He hadn't spoken publicly about Yock's death until an interview with ABC News in 2020 which was part of the six-part Thin Black Line podcast produced by ABC Indigenous.

Sam Watson wrote an article for The Sydney Morning Herald entitled "Turning Points" in which he described his account of what occurred when Yock died and detailed the hostile relationship that existed between the Aboriginal community and the police.

Kev Carmody's 1995 song "The Young Dancer Is Dead" is about Yock.

Yock's death and the issue of Aboriginal deaths in custody are explored in Ruby Langford Ginibi's 1999 book Haunted by the Past.

During the Black Lives Matter protests in Brisbane on 6 June 2020, some protesters held signs which included Yock's name.

== See also ==
- Aboriginal deaths in custody
- Royal Commission into Aboriginal Deaths in Custody

== Bibliography ==
- Berghofer, Greg. ‘Aboriginal Community Farewells Daniel.’ South Burnett Times (Kingaroy, Qld), 19 November 1993, 3
- Courier-Mail (Brisbane). ‘Police Demand Apology.’ 6 April 1994, 1
- Fogarty, Lionel. ‘Musgrave Park: Lionel Fogarty Talks to Philip Mead.’ RePublica (Sydney), no. 3 (1995): 119–31
- Queensland. A Report of an Investigation into the Arrest and Death of Daniel Alfred Yock. Brisbane: Criminal Justice Commission, 1994
- The Truth About the Killing of Daniel Yock: Workers Inquiry Exposes Police Murder. Marrickville, NSW: Labour Press Books, 1994
