= A1 Mine Settlement =

- Town
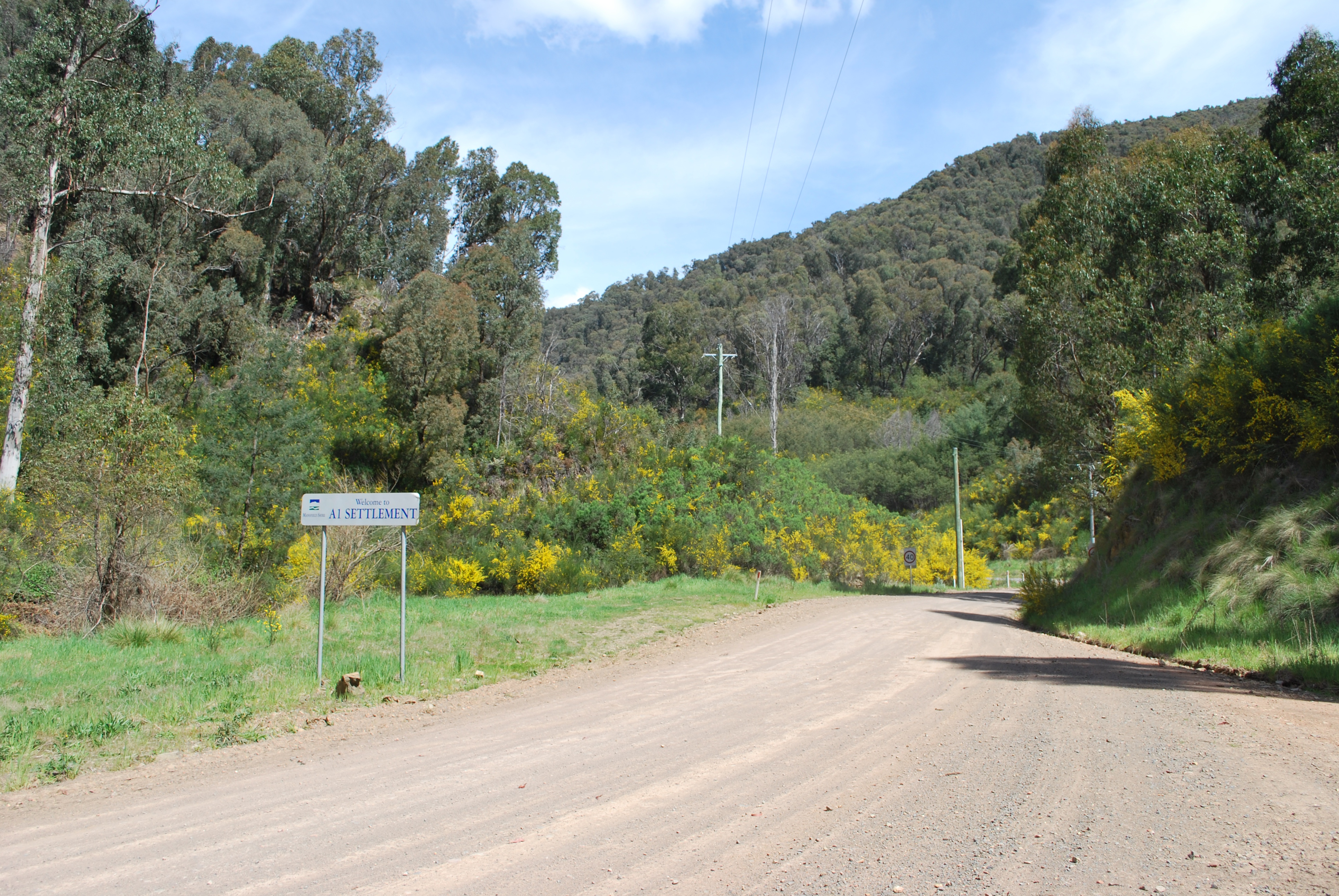
- Entering A1 Mining Settlement from Jamieson

- Coordinates: 37°30′S 146°12′E
- Country: Australia
- State: Victoria
- Region: Hume
- LGA: Shire of Mansfield
- Location: 210 km (130 mi) NE of Melbourne; 28 km (17 mi) E of Mansfield

A1 Mine Settlement is a locality in Victoria, Australia, located north of Woods Point on the Mansfield - Woods Point Road, in the Shire of Mansfield. The town has also been known as Castle Reef, Castle Point, and Raspberry Creek.

The town began after gold was discovered at Raspberry Creek in 1862. The name "A1" indicated that the quality of the gold mined here was 'First Class'. During the late 1860s the town known as Castle Reef had a population of around 300, a Post Office under that name opening on 11 January 1868 (closed 1875). It included two hotels, a general store, a school, a church, and possibly a restaurant. The town's industry was centred on a crushing machine which worked the three gold reefs in the area. These sites and others were amalgamated into the A1 Mine, which continued operation until 1992.

A receiving office opened here on 1 July 1910; it was later upgraded to a non-official post office and closed on 9 March 1967.

The A1 Mine has historically produced in excess of 450,000 ounces of gold and was one of Australia's longest operating mines having been worked from 1861 through to 1992.

== Reworking the A1 Mine ==
- August 2009 – Heron Resources purchased an Option to acquire and reopen the A1 Gold Mine. During the Option period (two years) a feasibility study will be completed using the results from the evaluation program.
- November 2009 – Department of Primary Industry Victoria and Mansfield Shire approvals have been received to commence site works required as part of the evaluation program for the A1 Gold Mine. Initial works will involve the setting up of a site office, workshops and ancillary buildings to support mining activities. Community consultation meetings were commenced in 9 September, these are an ongoing part of the evaluation and will continue through the life of the operation. Establishment of the decline portal is expected during November, while dewatering and underground drilling are expected to commence in the New Year when final approvals are received.
- February 2011 – Heron Resources sold the A1 Cold Mine to A1 Consolidated Gold who have more than 20 years experience at the A1 Gold Mine. Heron then became a foundation shareholder in A1 Consolidated Gold, by obtaining 19% interest in the company.
- June 2012 – A1 Consolidated Gold listed on the Australian Securities Exchange (ASX Code AYC). Some 5,000 tonnes (5,500 short tons) of development ore has already been mined. The IPO price has dropped below 10 cents per share.

== Fire problems ==
In 2006, A1 Mine Settlement was threatened by bushfires. Not much of the town remains anymore except a couple of houses which survived. The whole area was burnt including Gaffneys Creek and Ten Mile.

In 2026, fires again are threatening the town and surrounds.
