= Peter Gibb =

Australian criminal

Peter Robert Gibb (30 June 1954 – 23 January 2011) was an Australian criminal, known for his escape from the Melbourne Remand Centre in 1993.

== Escape from Melbourne Remand Centre ==
Gibb had several prior convictions for manslaughter, armed robbery and other weapons offences dating back to his mid-teens. In November 1981, he escaped from HM Prison Pentridge where he was awaiting a court hearing on charges of murder and armed robbery. He spent a month in St Kilda with fellow fugitive Trevor Smith who had escaped from Beechworth Correctional Centre. Police found and captured Gibb in Coburg.

In February 1993, he was convicted for the armed holdup of a security van in Sunshine two years earlier. Prior to his conviction, Gibb was held in the Melbourne Remand Centre, where he met prison officer Heather Parker. Parker's marriage to a fellow prison officer was ending, and she began a relationship with Gibb. In May 1992, the two of them were seen entering a broom cupboard, and Parker's colleagues demanded she be transferred, first to Pentridge and then the secure wing of St Vincent's Hospital.

On 7 March 1993, Gibb and a fellow prisoner, Archie Butterley, executed a meticulously planned escape with Parker's assistance. Using a small piece of explosive smuggled into the prison by Parker during a visit, Gibb and Butterley blew out part of a window and climbed down a string of knotted bedsheets to La Trobe Street below where a getaway car containing firearms and equipment was waiting. After several crashes, the escapees stole a motorcycle on the Westgate Freeway and continued on to Southbank Boulevard where they were intercepted by a police divisional van and engaged in a shootout with two officers. Gibb's arm was broken in the engagement, and one of the police officers was shot twice, then had his revolver and police van stolen by Gibb and Butterley.

Shortly after the shootout, Gibb and Butterley were seen climbing into a Suzuki Vitara, which a police check revealed was registered to Parker although police believed that she may have been a hostage. An Australia-wide alert was issued, as Gibb, Butterley and Parker picked up a previously stored Pajero four-wheel drive in Frankston and escaped into regional Victoria. They sought treatment for their injuries at Latrobe Regional Hospital in Traralgon, before hiding out in bushland for several days.

== Capture ==
On 11 March, the three fugitives turned up in the small town of Gaffneys Creek, 175 kilometres north-east of Melbourne. Smuggling Butterley into their hotel room and claiming he was their sick child, Gibb and Parker dined at the hotel restaurant and interacted with other guests. They departed the next day, however a fire broke out in the room they had stayed in, burning the hotel to the ground. Police investigating the fire matched the description of the couple with Gibb and Parker, and a huge search operation began. On 13 March, police found the Pajero hidden in bushland near Picnic Point, and began combing the area with sniffer dogs. Gibb and Parker were arrested when police found them attempting to wade across the Goulburn River. Butterley was found shot dead, and although he had engaged in a lengthy firefight with police, a forensic expert would later testify at the committal hearing that he had been shot with the police revolver the pair had taken in Southbank, and that he had not killed himself.

Parker served three-and-a-half years in prison for her role in assisting Gibb's escape. When she was released from Deer Park Metropolitan Women's Correctional Centre in September 1997, Gibb picked her up in a stretch limousine and they spent the night at the Crown Towers hotel. In 2005, Gibb was arrested for the alleged burglary of a car dealership in Balnarring. Parker also faced court in 2007 for assaulting a woman who had an affair with Gibb.

== Death ==
Gibb died at Frankston Hospital on the morning of 23 January 2011. He had sustained injuries after being beaten up by three men at his home in Seaford on the previous Friday (21 January). His girlfriend, Nicole Keating, told The Age newspaper that Gibb had been attacked as a response to a "practical joke" in which Gibb had pretended to shut a young boy in a freezer.

== Portrayal in media ==
The story of Gibb's escape and time on the run with Parker was adapted into a TV movie One Way Ticket (with the subjects' names changed to "Mick Webb" and "Deborah Carter"). Peter Phelps played the character based on Gibb.

== See also ==
- List of unsolved murders (2000–present)
