= Gaffneys Creek =

- Town
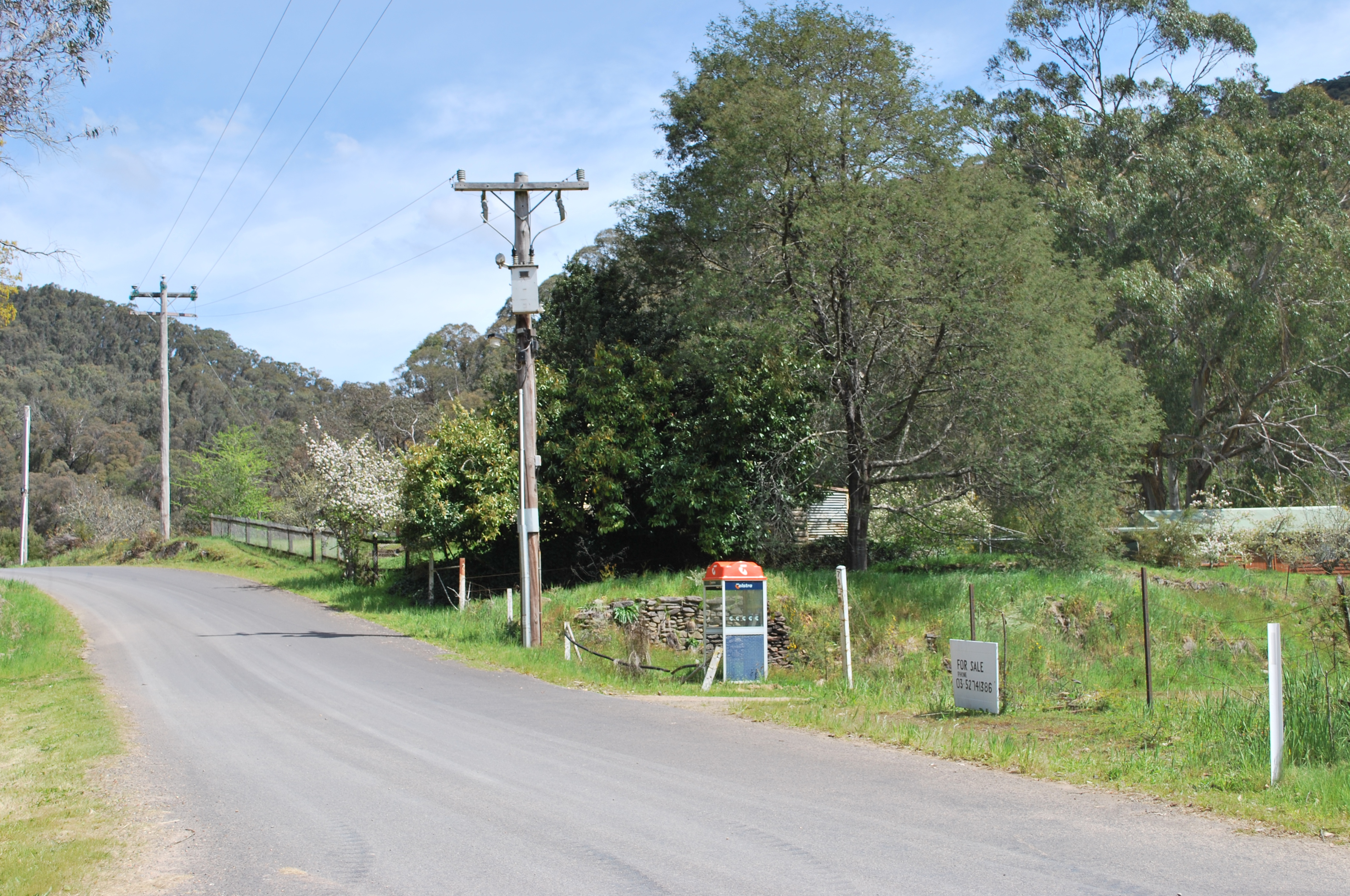
- Gaffneys Creek

- Coordinates: 37°28′S 146°11′E
- Country: Australia
- State: Victoria
- Region: Hume
- LGA: Shire of Mansfield

Government
  - State electorate: Eildon
  - Federal division: Indi

Population
  - Total: 6 (As of 18 August 2023)
- Postcode: 3723

Gaffneys Creek is a former mining settlement situated between Jamieson and Woods Point in Victoria, Australia. It is located at the junction of Gaffney and Raspberry Creeks in a steep valley in mountainous terrain. It is situated in the Shire of Mansfield on the unsealed Mansfield - Woods Point Rd.

== History ==
=== Gold ===
A prospector from the Big River area to the east, Terence "Red" Gaffney, was the first to actively search the area for gold, followed by John and William (Bill the Welshman) Jones who discovered rich alluvial gold at Raspberry Creek in 1859.

A string of small villages later appeared in the valley, and these were subsequently amalgamated and collectively named Lauraville by the Government Surveyor in honour of his wife, Laura. The Post Office (called Gaffneys Creek) opened on 1 January 1862 and closed in 1981. A Lauraville Office was open from 1902 until 1910.

The name "Lauraville" was changed to Gaffneys Creek in 1900.

Alluvial mining was later replaced by reef mining, but none of these mines were to achieve the success of the nearby A1 Mine Settlement and by the turn of the century the population had dwindled.

=== 20th century ===
In 1980 the area of the original valley settlements was placed on the Register of the National Estate as a Conservation Area including early miners' cottages, a hall, stone retaining walls and a hotel which succumbed to a fire in 1993.

In 1993, two escaped prisoners, Archie Butterley and Peter Gibb from the Melbourne Remand Centre, and a prison guard who assisted them to escape, drove to Gaffney's Creek to hide out. They stayed at the Gaffney's Creek Hotel and on the morning of 12 March a fire started in their room which resulted in the hotel being completely destroyed.

=== 21st century ===
In 2006 Gaffneys Creek was threatened by bushfires. About half of the residents of Gaffneys Creek stayed to defend their homes. However, not much of the town remains anymore except for a couple of houses which survived including two historic gold-era cottages. The town's community hall was destroyed and the whole area was burnt including A1 Mine Settlement and Ten Mile.

=== Demographics ===
The population within the settlement has steadily declined over the years:

- 1865: 1000
- 1871: 502
- 1911: 274
- 1954: 91

=== Notable residents ===
- William Adcock (1846–1931), journalist and politician
- Alfred Ainsworth (1827–1920), civil engineer and public servant
- Laurence Cohen (1874–1916), stonemason and trade unionist
- Sigismund Wekey (1825–1889), solicitor and postmaster
