= Tyrone Gilks =

Australian stunt performer

Tyrone Marley Gilks
- Born: 11 December 1993; Newcastle, Australia
- Died: 21 March 2013 (aged 19); Newcastle, Australia
- Cause of death: Motorcycle accident
- Other names: Bear, Snowflake
- Occupation: Professional motorbike rider
- Known for: World record length motorcycle jump 65cc, 85cc and 125cc, youngest backflip to dirt (12 years)
- Website: web.archive.org/web/20070212090618/http://www.tyronegilks.com/

Tyrone Gilks (11 December 1993 – 21 March 2013) was an Australian motorbike personality, known for his world record distance jumping and freestyle motocross riding. Gilks (known as Bear or Snowflake) was killed on 21 March 2013 during a training run for his final world record, the 250cc distance jump—currently held by Robbie Maddison.

== Early life ==
Gilks grew up in Newcastle, Australia and started racing motocross at a young age with his older brother, Morgan.

== World records ==
Gilks set his first unofficial world record on a 65cc motorcycle at 97 ft ramp to dirt while only ten years old. The following year, he set the world record by jumping 112 ft ramp to dirt on a 65cc motorcycle. He then broke his own world record by jumping 114 ft ramp to dirt on a 65cc motorcycle to set the world record for distance. He went on to set numerous records, some of which are listed below:

- 65cc distance world record (12 years) – 114 feet (35 m)
- 85cc distance world record – 169 feet (52 m)
- 125cc distance world record – 242 feet (73.76 m)
- Youngest backflip to dirt – 12 years old

== Freestyle career ==
Gilks was signed to the JC FMX team in 2010. In 2012, he won first prize in the freestyle motocross event at the New Zealand Unit Farm Jam. He returned in 2013 and took second prize – but he added a new record with the first 360 on natural terrain. He had recently travelled to America to meet his new manager, and to do some freeriding at Jackpot Ranch.

== Death ==
Gilks was due to take on Robbie Maddison's 250cc distance record at the Maitland Bike and Hot Rod show on 23 March 2013. Along with his family and close friends, they built a 6.5-metre (21 ft) tall mound of earth which was moulded into a landing ramp of gigantic proportions. A slim concrete runway was poured on the lead-up to the launch ramp. Early on Thursday 21 March, Gilks successfully jumped approximately 80 metres (260 ft) distance. On an 85-metre (279 ft) practice, Gilks did not get enough speed, landed on the front side of the landing ramp and was critically injured and knocked unconscious. He was airlifted by helicopter to the John Hunter Hospital where he died later that day due to the severity of the injuries sustained.

On Thursday 28 March, over 1200 mourners attended a farewell service at Macquarie Hills Church. The coffin was plastered with hundreds of stickers of his race plate and number 777 by all of his friends and family. He was buried at Catherine Hill Bay cemetery.
