= Syd Young =

Australian rules footballer

Personal information
- Full name: Sydney Young
- Born: 3 March 1918; London, England
- Died: 15 June 2013 (aged 95); Perth, Western Australia
- Original team: Claremont

Playing career^{1}
Years	Club	Games (Goals)
1937–41	Claremont (WAFL)	29
1941	South Melbourne	2 (0)
1945–49	Claremont (WAFL)	70
- ^{1} Playing statistics correct to the end of 1949.

Sydney Young (3 March 1918 – 15 June 2013) was an Australian rules footballer who played with South Melbourne Football Club in the Victorian Football League (VFL) and Claremont Football Club in the Western Australian Football League (WAFL). He died in 2013.
