= Billy Ward (boxer) =

Australian boxer

Personal information
- Full name: William Ward
- Nationality: Australian
- Born: 16 July 1993 Bundaberg, Queensland, Australia
- Died: 4 August 2013 (aged 20) Gladstone, Queensland, Australia
- Height: 1.63 m (5 ft 4 in)
- Weight: 49 kg (108 lb)

Sport
- Sport: Boxing
- Weight class: Light Flyweight
- Club: Gladstone Amateur Boxing Club

William Ward (16 July 1993 – 4 August 2013) was an Australian amateur boxer selected for the 2012 Summer Olympics in the light flyweight division.

== Career ==
Ward began his sporting career as a gymnast, winning a Queensland junior title in 2004. He switched to boxing in 2006 and the following year won an Australian junior title.

His boxing was curtailed by Ross River Fever in 2008 but he fought on and in 2011 he made the semifinals of the Australian Under 19 championships as a flyweight. The following year, he stepped up to open competition and dropped a weight division to light flyweight. He won both the Australian title and the Oceania Olympic Qualification tournament that year to earn a place at the London Olympic Games.

== 2012 Olympic record ==
- Round of 32: lost to Yosbany Veitia (Cuba) on points 4–26

== Personal life and death ==
Ward was noted for his short stature and curly red hair. He told the Sydney Morning Herald, most people assume he was a jockey rather than a boxer. The Gladstone Observer reported that when he returned to Gladstone after winning the Oceania qualifier, he was met by a group of fans wearing red curly wigs.

Ward died by suicide on 4 August 2013, aged 20, in Gladstone, Queensland.
