= List of acts of the Legislative Assembly of the Northern Territory =

This is an incomplete list of acts of the Legislative Assembly of the Northern Territory.

== 20th century ==
=== 1970-1979 ===
- List of acts of the Legislative Assembly of the Northern Territory from 1978
- List of acts of the Legislative Assembly of the Northern Territory from 1979

=== 1980-1989 ===
- List of acts of the Legislative Assembly of the Northern Territory from 1980
- List of acts of the Legislative Assembly of the Northern Territory from 1981
- List of acts of the Legislative Assembly of the Northern Territory from 1982
- List of acts of the Legislative Assembly of the Northern Territory from 1983
- List of acts of the Legislative Assembly of the Northern Territory from 1984
- List of acts of the Legislative Assembly of the Northern Territory from 1985
- List of acts of the Legislative Assembly of the Northern Territory from 1986
- List of acts of the Legislative Assembly of the Northern Territory from 1987
- List of acts of the Legislative Assembly of the Northern Territory from 1988
- List of acts of the Legislative Assembly of the Northern Territory from 1989

=== 1990-1999 ===
- List of acts of the Legislative Assembly of the Northern Territory from 1990
- List of acts of the Legislative Assembly of the Northern Territory from 1991
- List of acts of the Legislative Assembly of the Northern Territory from 1992
- List of acts of the Legislative Assembly of the Northern Territory from 1993
- List of acts of the Legislative Assembly of the Northern Territory from 1994
- List of acts of the Legislative Assembly of the Northern Territory from 1995
- List of acts of the Legislative Assembly of the Northern Territory from 1996
- List of acts of the Legislative Assembly of the Northern Territory from 1997
- List of acts of the Legislative Assembly of the Northern Territory from 1998
- List of acts of the Legislative Assembly of the Northern Territory from 1999

== 21st century ==
=== 2000-2009 ===
- List of acts of the Legislative Assembly of the Northern Territory from 2000
- List of acts of the Legislative Assembly of the Northern Territory from 2001
- List of acts of the Legislative Assembly of the Northern Territory from 2002
- List of acts of the Legislative Assembly of the Northern Territory from 2003
- List of acts of the Legislative Assembly of the Northern Territory from 2004
- List of acts of the Legislative Assembly of the Northern Territory from 2005
- List of acts of the Legislative Assembly of the Northern Territory from 2006
- List of acts of the Legislative Assembly of the Northern Territory from 2007
- List of acts of the Legislative Assembly of the Northern Territory from 2008
- List of acts of the Legislative Assembly of the Northern Territory from 2009

=== 2010-2019 ===
- List of acts of the Legislative Assembly of the Northern Territory from 2010
- List of acts of the Legislative Assembly of the Northern Territory from 2011
- List of acts of the Legislative Assembly of the Northern Territory from 2012
- List of acts of the Legislative Assembly of the Northern Territory from 2013
- List of acts of the Legislative Assembly of the Northern Territory from 2014
- List of acts of the Legislative Assembly of the Northern Territory from 2015
- List of acts of the Legislative Assembly of the Northern Territory from 2016
- List of acts of the Legislative Assembly of the Northern Territory from 2017
- List of acts of the Legislative Assembly of the Northern Territory from 2018
- List of acts of the Legislative Assembly of the Northern Territory from 2019

=== 2020- ===
- List of acts of the Legislative Assembly of the Northern Territory from 2020
- List of acts of the Legislative Assembly of the Northern Territory from 2021
- List of acts of the Legislative Assembly of the Northern Territory from 2022
- List of acts of the Legislative Assembly of the Northern Territory from 2023
- List of acts of the Legislative Assembly of the Northern Territory from 2024
- List of acts of the Legislative Assembly of the Northern Territory from 2025
- List of acts of the Legislative Assembly of the Northern Territory from 2026

== See also ==
- Northern Territory Legislative Council
- Northern Territory Legislative Assembly
