= Aboriginal Heritage Act =

Aboriginal Heritage Act may refer to various acts of parliament in Australian states and territories, including:

- Aboriginal Heritage Act 1972, a law in the state of Western Australia governing the protection of Aboriginal cultural sites
- Aboriginal Heritage Act 1988 a law in the state of South Australia governing the protection of Aboriginal cultural sites
- Aboriginal Heritage Act 2006, a law in the state of Victoria governing the protection of Aboriginal cultural sites

== See also ==
- Aboriginal Cultural Heritage Act 2003, a law in the state of Queensland governing the protection of Aboriginal cultural sites
- Aboriginal Cultural Heritage Act 2021, a short-lived law in the state of Western Australia governing the protection of Aboriginal cultural sites, revoked and replaced by an amended Aboriginal Heritage Act 1972
- Australian Aboriginal sacred site
- Australian heritage law
