= 2020s in Australia =

Events from the decade 2020s in Australia.

== 46th Parliament, 2019–2022 ==
=== General history ===
At the 2019 election, in the 151-seat House of Representatives, the incumbent Coalition government was reelected with 77 seats, a majority of two seats. The Labor opposition won 68 seats. Six other MPs were elected to the crossbench, with the Greens, Centre Alliance, Katter's Australian Party, and independents Andrew Wilkie, Helen Haines and Zali Steggall winning a seat each.

In the Senate, 40 of 76 seats were up for election. Following the election, the Coalition had a total of 35 seats, four short of a majority. Labor held 26 seats, the Greens held 9 seats, Centre Alliance and One Nation each held two seats, the Jacqui Lambie Network held one and one seat was held by independent Cory Bernardi, who deregistered the party he was previously a member of on 25 June 2019.

Following the Coalition's victory in the 2019 federal election, the Second Morrison Ministry was formed in 2019; this succeeded the First Morrison Ministry, which was dissolved in May 2019. In Foreign Affairs, the Morrison government concluded the Indonesia-Australia Comprehensive Economic Partnership Agreement, and signed the AUKUS trilateral security pact between Australia, the United Kingdom and the United States. On the economy, after the lowest deficit in a decade, Morrison predicted a small surplus in the 2019 Federal Budget, however the impact of the COVID-19 pandemic led to a dramatic increase in government expenditure. Pandemic management became a core focus of the Morrison government, which instigated tight border controls and a program of income support for business and workers. Two years into the pandemic, Australia had achieved one of the lowest death rates and highest vaccination rates in the world.

=== Specific issues and events ===
==== Bushfires ====
Political and social debate surrounded many aspects of the 2019–20 Australian bushfire season, particularly regarding the causes and future prevention of such fire activity, and the role of climate change. Amid a conservative government that received noted criticism for its climate change inaction and support for fossil fuel industries, growing acknowledgement within the nation's politics and society of the issue of climate change in Australia resulted in a highly political agenda to the crisis response. The governing Liberal and National parties, accompanied by numerous news outlets associated with climate change denial, firmly deflected responsibility away from the record-breaking drought affecting the country and its associated links to climate change observations and projections.

Further controversy has surrounded Prime Minister Scott Morrison for taking an overseas family holiday to Hawaii, United States, during the bushfires. These criticisms also applied to New South Wales Minister for Emergency Services David Elliot, who went for a holiday in Europe. Queensland Premier Annastacia Palaszczuk was also criticised for holidaying on a cruise ship while fires were active in the state. While travelling throughout fire-affected towns in New South Wales, Morrison was filmed attempting to shake the hands of two residents in Cobargo who had refused to shake his outstretched hand. Morrison was criticised for grabbing and then shaking their hands despite their refusals.

==== COVID-19 pandemic ====
The COVID-19 pandemic in Australia is part of the ongoing worldwide pandemic of coronavirus disease 2019 (COVID-19) caused by severe acute respiratory syndrome coronavirus 2 (SARS-CoV-2). The first confirmed case in Australia was identified on 25 January 2020, in Victoria, when a man who had returned from Wuhan, China, tested positive for SARS-CoV-2.

Australian borders were closed to all non-residents on 20 March. Social distancing rules were imposed on 21 March and state governments started to close "non-essential" services. "Non-essential services" included social gathering venues such as pubs and clubs but unlike many other countries did not include most business operations such as construction, manufacturing and many retail categories.

The number of new cases initially grew sharply, then levelled out at about 350 per day around 22 March, and started falling at the beginning of April to under 20 per day by the end of the month. As of 8 June 2020, 3 pm, 7,265 cases and 102 deaths had been reported in Australia, with the highest number of cases being in New South Wales, with 3,112.

===== Pandemic economic response =====
The federal government announced an economic stimulus package to combat the effects of coronavirus on the economy.

On 12 March 2020 the government announced a A$17.6 billion stimulus package, the first since the 2008 financial crisis. The package consists of multiple parts, a one-off A$750 payment to around 6.5 million welfare recipients as early as 31 March 2020, small business assistance with 700,000 grants up to $25,000 and a 50% wage subsidy for 120,000 apprentices or trainees for up to 9 months, 1 billion to support economically impacted sectors, regions and communities, and $700 million to increase tax write off and $3.2 billion to support short-term small and medium-sized business investment.

On 30 March the Australian Government announced a $130 billion "JobKeeper" wage subsidy program. The JobKeeper program would pay employers up to $1500 a fortnight per full-time, part-time or casual employee that has worked for that business for over a year. For a business to be eligible, they must have lost 30% of turnover after 1 March of annual revenue up to and including $1 billion. For businesses with a revenue of over $1 billion, turnover must have decreased by 50%. Businesses are then required by law to pay the subsidy to their staff, in lieu of their usual wages. This response came after the enormous job losses seen just a week prior when an estimated 1 million Australians lost their jobs. This massive loss in jobs caused the myGov website to crash and lines out of Centrelink offices to run hundreds of metres long. The program was backdated to 1 March, to aim at reemploying the many people who had just lost their jobs in the weeks before. Businesses would receive the JobKeeper subsidy for 6 months.

The announcement of the JobKeeper wage subsidy program is the largest measure announced by the Australian Government in response to the economic impact of the COVID-19 Outbreak. In the first hour of the scheme, over 8,000 businesses registered to receive the payments. The JobKeeper wage subsidy program is one of the largest economic packages ever implemented in the history of Australia.

==== Tensions with China ====
In November 2019, the Australian news network Nine Network aired a report on alleged efforts by China to infiltrate the Parliament of Australia by recruiting car dealer Bo "Nick" Zhao to run in a constituency during an election, in what was called the 2019 Australian Parliament infiltration plot. Zhao was later found dead in a Melbourne hotel room with the cause undetermined. Prime Minister Scott Morrison said the incident was "deeply disturbing and troubling" and that "Australia is not naive to the threats that it faces" before cautioning "anyone leaping to any conclusions about these matters". Chinese foreign ministry spokesman Geng Shuang rejected the alleged plot and said that some Australian politicians, institutions and media outlets "reached a state of hysteria and extreme nervousness".

According to The New York Times, many countries including Australia saw worsening relations with China during the COVID-19 pandemic. In June 2020, China's foreign ministry spokesperson Hua Chunying criticised Prime Minister Morrison after responding to a European Union report alleging that Beijing was disseminating disinformation about the pandemic. The Australian government's call for an independent investigation into the causes of the pandemic provoked angry responses from China, with Beijing calling it "a joke". Western commentators, including those at The Washington Post identified China's subsequent targeting of Australian trade, particularly beef, barley, lobsters and coal, as being "defacto economic sanctions."

On 17 November 2020, China's embassy released a list of Chinese grievances against Australia. The list includes such issues as government funding for "anti-China" research at the Australian Strategic Policy Institute, raids on Chinese journalists and academic visa cancellations, "spearheading a crusade" in multilateral forums on China's affairs in Taiwan, Hong Kong and Xinjiang, and calling for an independent investigation into the origins of COVID-19. A Chinese embassy official stated in a briefing with a reporter, "China is angry. If you make China the enemy, China will be the enemy." The official said that if Australia backed away from the policies on the list, it would be "conducive to a better atmosphere". The statement was seen as an open threat towards Australia.

On 16 September 2021, Australia announced a complex plan to purchase American nuclear submarines, in cooperation with Great Britain. It is a key element of the new "AUKUS" political-military alignment. Although China was not specifically mentioned in the news announcements, critics interpreted it as a major blow to Australian-Chinese relationship, by firmly allying Australia with the United States in military terms in the region. For the first time the United States and Britain will share their top-secret technology for nuclear submarines, which have a far wider range and lethal value than diesel submarines. By making the deal, Canberra broke with Paris, canceling a deal to purchase less expensive, less effective French diesel submarines. No nuclear weapons are involved, and the submarines will carry conventional weapons only.

==== Indigenous relations ====
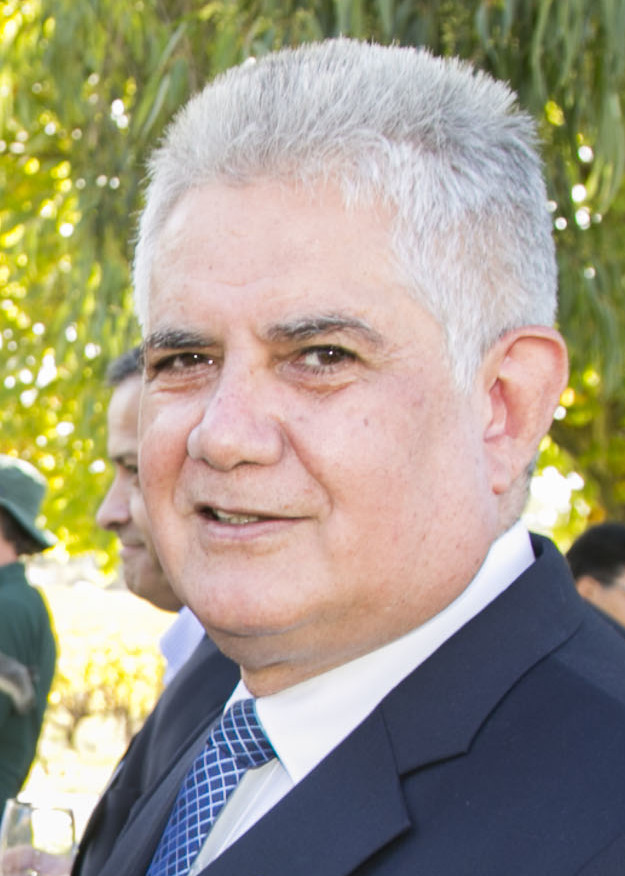
Ken Wyatt, the first indigenous Australian to sit in Cabinet

The Morrison government's second term commenced with the historic appointment of Ken Wyatt as Minister for Indigenous Australians in the Second Morrison Ministry. Wyatt became the first Aboriginal person to sit in Cabinet and hold the indigenous affairs portfolio.

The Indigenous voice to government was a body first proposed by the Australian Government in October 2019 in order to create a channel for the voices and ideas of Aboriginal and Torres Strait Islander people to be heard in Australia. The process by which the channel will be established is known as the Indigenous voice co-design process. Arising from a request in the 2017 Uluru Statement from the Heart to have "a First Nations Voice enshrined in the Constitution", referred to as an Indigenous voice to Parliament, the Voice to government announced in October 2019 does not include this aspect, although a referendum on the subject has been promised. The Senior Advisory Group (SAG), composed of prominent Aboriginal Australians, was the first body set up.

In November 2019, the First People's Assembly (FPA) was elected, consisting of 21 members representing Aboriginal Victorians, elected from five different regions in the state, and 10 members to represent each of the state's formally recognised traditional owner corporations, excluding the Yorta Yorta Nation Aboriginal Corporation, who declined to participate in the election process. The main aim of the Assembly is to work out the rules by which individual treaties will be negotiated between the Victoria State Government and individual Aboriginal peoples.

The George Floyd protests in Australia often referenced recent instances of Aboriginal deaths in custody. These include: the 2014 death of Ms Dhu in police custody; the 2015 death of David Dungay (whose final words were "I can't breathe") in a prison hospital; the 2017 death of Tanya Day in a police cell; and the forceful arrest of an Aboriginal teenager on 1 June 2020, the media considering similarities with Aboriginal deaths in custody and wider social issues faced by Indigenous Australians.

On 11 July 2020, the Victoria State Government announced that it would establish a truth and reconciliation commission for Aboriginal Australians in Victoria, the first ever in Australia, with the terms of reference to be worked out collaboratively.

The Juukan Gorge cave that was the only inland site in Australia with evidence of continuous human occupation for over 46,000 years, including through the last Ice Age was permanently destroyed by mining company Rio Tinto in May 2020. Ministerial consent had been given to expand Rio Tinto's mine in 2013 under WA legislation. Prior to its destruction, the cave in Juukan Gorge was a sacred site for the traditional owners of the land, the Puutu Kunti Kurrama and Pinikura (Binigura) peoples. After this aroused widespread international media coverage and public outcry, Rio Tinto apologised to the Puutu Kunti Kurrama and the Pinikura peoples for the destruction of the caves and for causing distress.

On the eve of Australia Day, 2022, the Morrison government announced that it had transferred the Aboriginal flag's copyright to the Commonwealth. Prime Minister Morrison said the flag had been "freed" for all Australians to use without asking for permission or the need to pay someone. Copyright was originally held by the original designer Harold Thomas, however non-Indigenous company WAM Clothing had bought exclusive rights to the flag in November 2018.

2023 Australian Indigenous Voice referendum by state or territory

A 2023 Australian Indigenous Voice referendum was held on 14 October 2023. It was unsuccessful, with a majority of voters both nationwide and in all states voting against the proposal.

==== Parliament sexual misconduct allegations ====
In February and March 2021, a number of allegations involving rape and other sexual misconduct against women involving the Australian Parliament and federal politicians were raised, causing controversy especially for the federal Liberal-National government headed by Prime Minister Scott Morrison.

On 15 February 2021, Liberal Party junior staffer Brittany Higgins alleged to two media outlets – news.com.au and The Project — that she had been raped late at night on 22 March 2019 in then-Defence Industry Minister Senator Linda Reynolds' office in the ministerial wing of Parliament House by a male colleague, who was not named, after security guards let the pair into the building.

On 26 February 2021, the ABC published details of a letter that had been sent to the Prime Minister and several other members of parliament, including Senate Opposition Leader Penny Wong and Greens Senator Sarah Hanson-Young. It alleged that a 16-year-old girl had been raped in Sydney in 1988 by a man who was now a member of Cabinet. The letter was anonymous, and included a statement by the alleged victim, who had opened a case with New South Wales Police in 2020, but closed it shortly before taking her own life in Adelaide in June 2020. The identity of the minister was not disclosed, but on 3 March Attorney-General, House Leader and Industrial Relations Minister Christian Porter held a press conference identifying himself as the minister.

On 28 February 2021, Liberal Senator Sarah Henderson said a woman had sent her an email alleging she had been raped by a man who is now a Labor federal member of Parliament. A date for the alleged rape was not given, but it was described as "historic". The matter was referred to Australian Federal Police. In March 2021, details emerged of a Facebook group where women shared stories of sexual harassment within the Labor Party, but without sharing the names of the alleged harassers. Deputy leader Richard Marles said he was "appalled".

In March 2021, photos and videos were leaked from a group chat of male government staffers, where they had performed sex acts in Parliament House, including masturbating on the desk of female MP Nola Marino. Peta Credlin alleged:

When an MP cleaned out the former staffer’s desk, and the computer, that MP uncovered evidence that for many months, that staffer had regularly met with other men during the middle of the day — while the MP was in Question Time — for orgies in political offices.

The 2021 March 4 Justice took place on 15 March 2021 across Australia. The protest included a series of events in major Australian cities including the nation's capital Canberra. Protests occurred in 40 cities in Australia; organisers estimated 110,000 people were in attendance, including the federal opposition leader as well as other politicians from the major political parties.

On 26 March 2021, Morrison demanded that federal Liberal MP Andrew Laming both personally and publicly apologise to two women for trolling them on Facebook, and stop using social media to post trolling comments. It was also alleged that Laming hid in bushes in a public park and took photos of one of the women. She reported the incidents to the police. On 27 March, Laming stood aside from all parliamentary roles after another woman accused him of taking a mobile phone photo of her bottom while her underwear was visible in 2019.

The Morrison government has been widely criticised for its handling of these scandals, with an Essential poll finding 65% of respondents (including 76% of Labor supporters, 51% of Coalition supporters and 88% of Greens supporters) saying the Government was more interested in protecting itself than women.

In December 2021, Alan Tudge stood down as Minister for Education and Youth after Prime Minister Scott Morrison announced an investigation into domestic abuse allegations against Tudge from a former staffer who claimed that the two were involved in an extramarital affair.
