= Aboriginal heritage inquiry system =

The Aboriginal heritage inquiry system, or AHIS, is a database providing information concerning Aboriginal heritage places in Western Australia.

Aboriginal heritage sites in Western Australia are protected under the Aboriginal Heritage Act 1972, with information on these sites accessible through the Aboriginal heritage inquiry system.
