= Australian heritage law =

Set of laws in Australia

Australian heritage laws exist at the national (Commonwealth) level, and at each of Australian Capital Territory, New South Wales, Northern Territory, Queensland, South Australia, Tasmania, Victoria, Western Australia state and territory levels. Generally there are separate laws governing Aboriginal cultural heritage and sacred sites, and historical (sometimes referred to as post-contact or non-Aboriginal) heritage. State laws also allow heritage to be protected through local government regulations, such as planning schemes, as well.

== Overview ==
The heritage laws seek to protect, preserve, present, and transmit the Australian nation's natural, cultural, and historical heritage.

== National heritage ==
The Aboriginal and Torres Strait Islander Heritage Protection Act 1984 is legislation passed by the parliament of the Commonwealth of Australia to enable the Commonwealth to intervene and, where necessary, preserve and protect areas and objects of particular significance to Australia's Aboriginal or Torres Strait Islander peoples.

The Environment Protection and Biodiversity Conservation Act 1999 protects places of World Heritage, National Heritage and Commonwealth Heritage, The Commonwealth Heritage List includes places such as Federally owned telegraph stations, defence sites, migration centres, customs houses, lighthouses, national institutions such as Parliament and High Court buildings, memorials, islands and marine areas. The Australian National Heritage List is a heritage register, including natural, historic and indigenous places deemed to be of outstanding heritage significance to Australia.

The Natural Heritage Trust (NHT) was set up in 1997 by means of the Natural Heritage Trust of Australia Act 1997, with the main objective of conserving the "natural capital infrastructure" of Australia. Money from the NHT Account must be spent on the environment, sustainable agriculture and natural resources management (NRM). Funding is supplied to community groups and organisations for environmental and natural resource management projects, delivered via a number of different initiatives since 1997, including "Caring for Our Country". As of June 2020, the NHT account is funding a program known as Phase Two of the National Landcare Program.

Other Commonwealth legislation which affects Indigenous cultural heritage includes:

- Aboriginal Land Rights (Northern Territory) Act 1976
- Protection of Movable Cultural Heritage Act 1986
- Native Title Act 1993

== State and territory heritage ==
=== New South Wales ===
The goal of NSW legislation is to conserve and manage the state's cultural and natural heritage of places, objects, and features of cultural, scientific, architectural or social significance, including to the state's Aboriginal peoples, and to promote public appreciation of such places and objects. Its instruments are the National Parks and Wildlife Act 1974 and the National Parks and Wildlife Amendment (Aboriginal Ownership) Act 1996 (No. 142). The latter amends the former to "provide for Aboriginal ownership of land of Aboriginal cultural significance reserved or dedicated under that Act; to amend the Aboriginal Land Rights Act 1983 to provide for the grant of certain land claims subject to lease, and reservation or dedication, of the land under the National Parks and Wildlife Act 1974;..." and other purposes.

The Heritage Act 1977 (NSW) also provides for the conservation of environmental heritage items in New South Wales.

On occasion, damage to the environment and Aboriginal heritage has been considered in the Land and Environment Court of New South Wales, such as when Chinese billionaire Kuizhang Guo built illegal structures, planted exotic species and built a bar inside a heritage-listed Aboriginal rock cave on Crown land.

The State Heritage Inventory is a database of heritage items in New South Wales which includes:

- declared Aboriginal Places;
- items listed on the State Heritage Register;
- listed Interim Heritage Orders;
- items on State Agency Heritage Registers; and
- items listed of local heritage significance on a local council's Local Environmental Plan.

=== Northern Territory ===
The Northern Territory Heritage Register is a statutory list of protected places in the Northern Territory, under the Heritage Act 2011 (NT).

=== Queensland ===
The Queensland Heritage Register is a statutory list of places in Queensland that are protected by the Queensland Heritage Act 1992. The register is maintained by the Queensland Heritage Council. Under Section 113 of the Queensland Heritage Act 1992, all local government authorities in Queensland must maintain a local heritage register; the Brisbane Heritage Register is an example of a local government heritage register in Queensland.

On 16 April 2003, the Queensland Aboriginal Cultural Heritage Act 2003 was passed by Parliament to provide statutory protection to all Aboriginal heritage across the State, irrespective of whether the heritage was previously identified by the State's "Cultural Heritage Coordination Unit" of the Department of Natural Resources and Water. There is also the Torres Strait Islander Cultural Heritage Act 2003 for Torres Strait Islander heritage.

=== South Australia ===
The Aboriginal Heritage Act 1988 aims to protect and preserve South Australia's Aboriginal heritage. While the Act maintains the Aboriginal Heritage Register for the previous legislation it also provides blanket protection for all Aboriginal heritage, whether on the register or not. It also establishes an Aboriginal Heritage Committee of indigenous people appointed by the minister.

=== Tasmania ===
The Historic Cultural Heritage Act 1995 aims to promote the protection and conservation of places of historic cultural heritage significance in Tasmania. The Act established the Tasmanian Heritage Council and the Tasmanian Heritage Register.

=== Victoria ===
Victorian Aboriginal heritage protection is governed by the Aboriginal Heritage Act 2006. Under the Act all Aboriginal culturally significant aspects are protect by Victorian Law. A steering committee, The Aboriginal Heritage Council was established to allow government a consultation and steerage functionality back to the major Aboriginal Communities within Victoria, referred to as Registered Aboriginal Parties.

The Heritage Act 2017 provides for the protection and conservation of historical places and objects of cultural heritage significance and the registration of such places and objects. The Act establishes a Heritage Council to oversee heritage policy and implementation; and a Victorian Heritage Register, for listing and protection of places of significance to the state of Victoria. archaeological heritage is also protected by the Heritage Act through blanket protection of archaeological places and objects greater than 50 years old, and through the Victorian Heritage Inventory of historical archaeological sites, as well as historic shipwrecks.

The Planning & Environment Act 1987 includes provisions for protecting heritage through Local Planning Policies, and listing places on the Municipal Planning Scheme Heritage Overlay.

=== Western Australia ===
Protection of Aboriginal heritage sites and objects in WA is governed by the Aboriginal Cultural Heritage Act 2021.

== See also ==
- Environment Protection and Biodiversity Conservation Act 1999
- Aboriginal Heritage Act 1988 (SA)
- Aboriginal Cultural Heritage Act 2003 (Qld)
- National Parks and Wildlife Act 1974 (NSW)
- Aboriginal Heritage Act 2006 (Victoria)
