= Pastoralists and Graziers Association of Western Australia =

Lobby group for agricultural producers in Western Australia

The Pastoralists and Graziers Association of Western Australia (PGA), is a Perth-based lobby group acting in the interests of agricultural and associated industries, in particular promoting free enterprise in the industry.

== History ==
The PGA was founded in 1907.

The PGA opposed the Aboriginal Cultural Heritage Act 2021 in 2023.

== Description ==
The PGA supports a free market system and strongly opposes "statutory marketing" and related governmental regulation. It has sometimes clashed with the Western Australian Farmers Federation, over issues such as lamb and wheat marketing.
