= Northern Territory Legislative Assembly =

Unicameral legislature of the Northern Territory, Australia

Coordinates: 12.466655°S 130.842748°E

Legislative Assembly of the Northern Territory
- 15th Assembly
- Coat of Arms of the Northern Territory

- Legislative Assembly logo

Type
- Type: Unicameral

History
- Founded: 1974; 52 years ago

Leadership
- Speaker: Robyn Lambley since 15 October 2024
- Deputy Speaker: Brian O'Gallagher
- Leader of Government Business: Steve Edgington, Country Liberal
- Government Whip: Andrew Mackay, Country Liberal since 24 August 2024

Structure
- Seats: 25
- Political groups: Government (17): Country Liberal (17); Opposition (6): Labor (6); Crossbench (2): Independent (2) (Note: Current independent MLAs: Justine Davis (Johnston), Robyn Lambley (Araluen))
- Length of term: 4 years

Elections
- Voting system: Full preferential voting
- First election: 19 October 1974
- Last election: 24 August 2024
- Next election: 22 August 2028

Meeting place
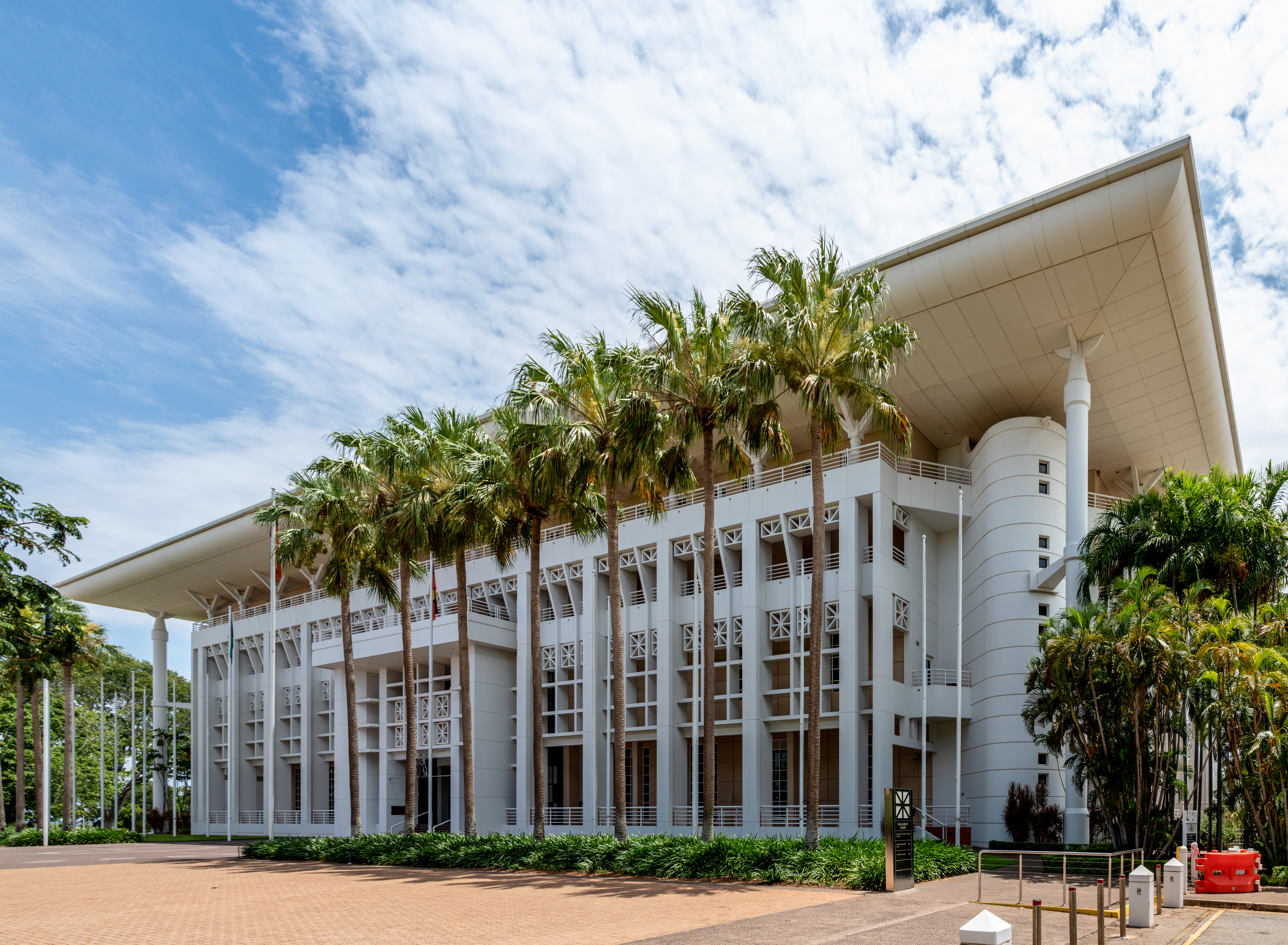
- Parliament House, Darwin

Website
- parliament.nt.gov.au

Constitution
- Northern Territory (Self-Government) Act 1978 (Cth)

The Legislative Assembly of the Northern Territory (also known as the Parliament of the Northern Territory) is the unicameral legislature of Australia's Northern Territory. The Legislative Assembly has 25 members, each elected in single-member electorates for four-year terms. The voting method for the Assembly is the full-preferential voting system, having previously been optional preferential voting. Elections are on the fourth Saturday in August of the fourth year after the previous election, but can be earlier in the event of a no-confidence vote in the government. The most recent election for the Legislative Assembly was the 2024 election held on 24 August. The next election is scheduled for 26 August 2028.

Persons who are qualified under the Commonwealth Electoral Act 1918 to vote for a member for the Northern Territory in the House of Representatives are qualified to vote at an election for the Legislative Assembly. Voting is compulsory for all those over 18 years of age. Since 2004, elections have been conducted by the Northern Territory Electoral Commission, which also organises regular electoral redistributions.

Bills passed by the Legislative Assembly become laws once given assent by the Administrator of the Northern Territory, the representative of the Commonwealth Government and the Crown in right of the Northern Territory.

== Current distribution of seats ==
As of 12 September 2026, the current distribution of seats is:

Party	Seats
Party	Current Assembly (Total 25 Seats)
Country Liberal	17
Labor	6
Independent	2

- 13 votes as a majority are required to pass legislation.

== Powers ==
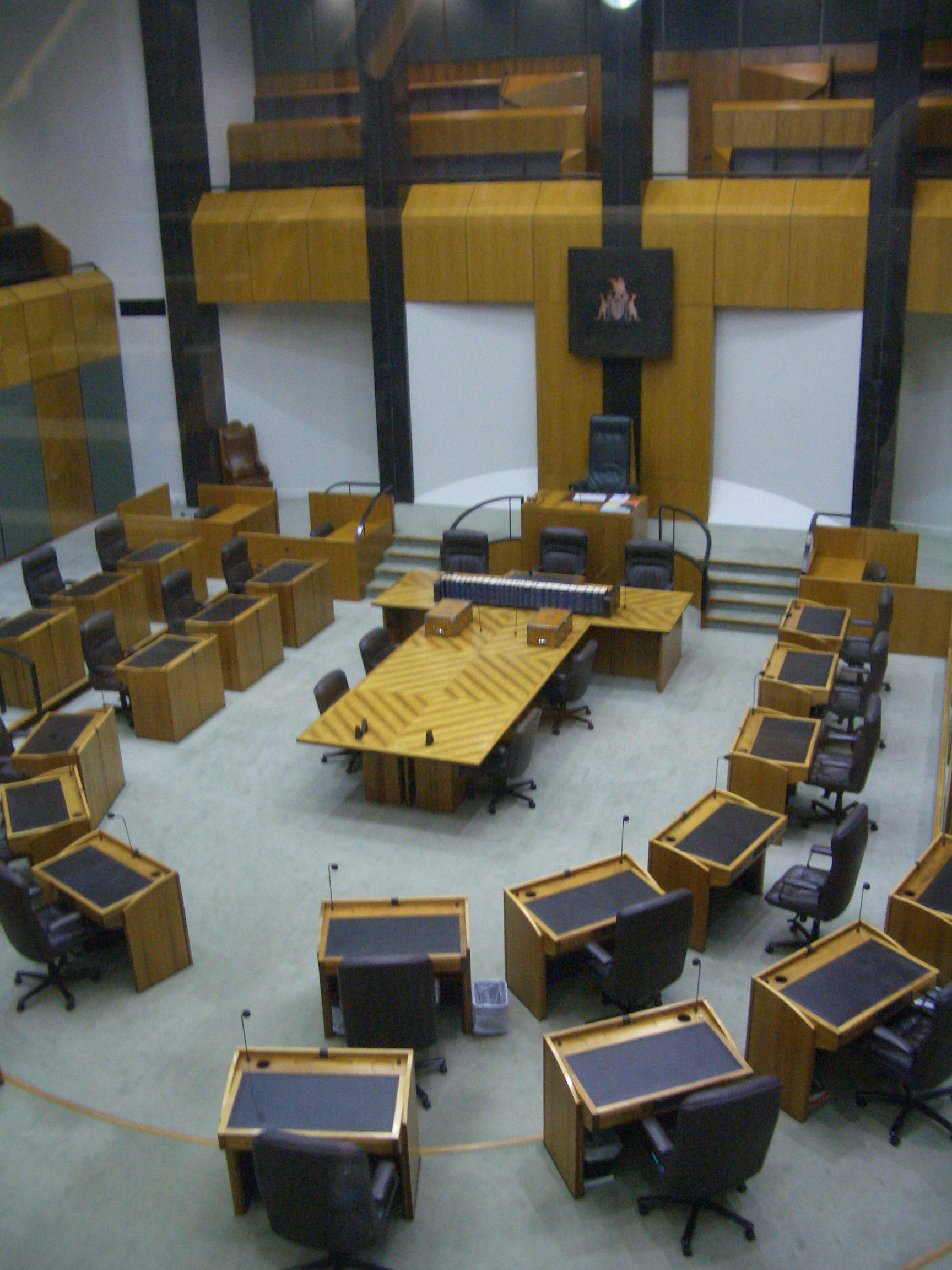
The legislative assembly chamber

In 1978, the Northern Territory was granted limited self-government by the Northern Territory (Administration) Act 1974 (Cth), an act of the federal parliament. The federal government retains control of certain legislative areas, including Aboriginal land, industrial relations, national parks and uranium mining. For inter-governmental financial purposes the Northern Territory has been regarded by the Commonwealth as a State since 1 July 1988.

All questions arising in the Assembly are determined by a majority of votes and the Speaker, or other member presiding, is also entitled to vote. Where there is an equality of votes the Speaker, or other member presiding, shall have a casting vote.

Legislation passed by the Assembly requires assent by the Administrator of the Northern Territory, acting on the advice of the Government, a practice analogous to the royal assent of an Australian state governor. Under Australian constitutional practice, assent is usually a formality. After the Administrator gives assent, the Governor-General of Australia also has the power to reject a law on the advice of the Prime Minister of Australia and the federal Cabinet, but this power has also been only rarely exercised. The federal government also retains power to legislate for the Territory in all matters, including the right to override legislation passed by the Assembly.

The party or coalition with the most seats in the Assembly is invited by the Administrator to form government. The leader of that party subsequently becomes the Chief Minister of the Northern Territory, and their senior colleagues become ministers responsible for various portfolios. As Australian political parties traditionally vote along party lines, most legislation introduced by the party commanding a majority will pass through the Legislative Assembly.

== Source of legislative power ==
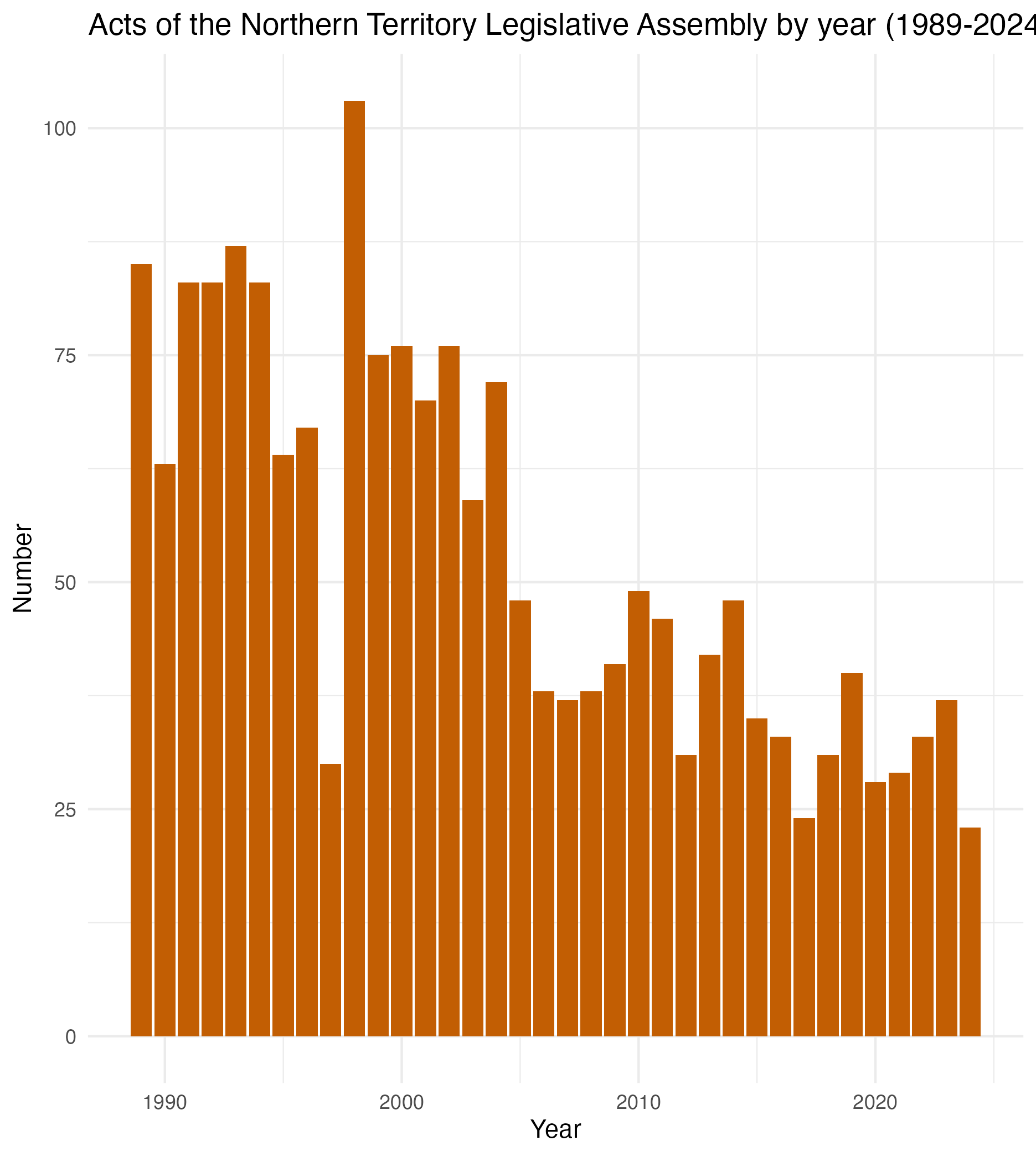
Bar chart showing the number of acts of the Northern Territory Legislative Assembly by year (1989-2024)

The Legislative Assembly acting with the assent of the administrator is vested with general legislative power, similar to that of the state parliaments. The Northern Territory (Administration) Act 1974 (Cth) granted self-government to the Territory. The federal government retains control of certain legislative areas, including Aboriginal land, industrial relations, national parks and uranium mining.

However, while the state parliaments derive their legislative powers from constitutional sources, the Northern Territory derives its legislative power from the delegation of powers from the Commonwealth. The Australian Parliament thus retains the right to legislate for the Territory, if it chooses to exercise it. This includes the power to override any legislation passed by the Northern Territory Parliament.

For example, in response to the Northern Territory Parliament's passage of the Rights of the Terminally Ill Act 1995, the Territory's voluntary euthanasia law, the federal Parliament passed the Euthanasia Laws Act 1997, which amended the laws granting self-government to the territories–in the Northern Territory's case, the Northern Territory (Self-Government) Act 1978–to remove that area from the legislative competences of the territories.

== History ==
When South Australia turned the Northern Territory over to Commonwealth hands in 1911, the federal government ran the Territory directly through the relevant minister, and the only elective body in the Territory was the Darwin town council. The territory was split in 1927 into the territories of North Australia and Central Australia, both of which had a four-member Advisory Council that was half-elected and half-appointed; in addition, development of North Australia was left to the locally-based North Australia Commission. These changes were reversed in 1931, with the Northern Territory reformed and the federal government resuming control until the 1947 formation of the Northern Territory Legislative Council, which was half-elected and half-appointed.

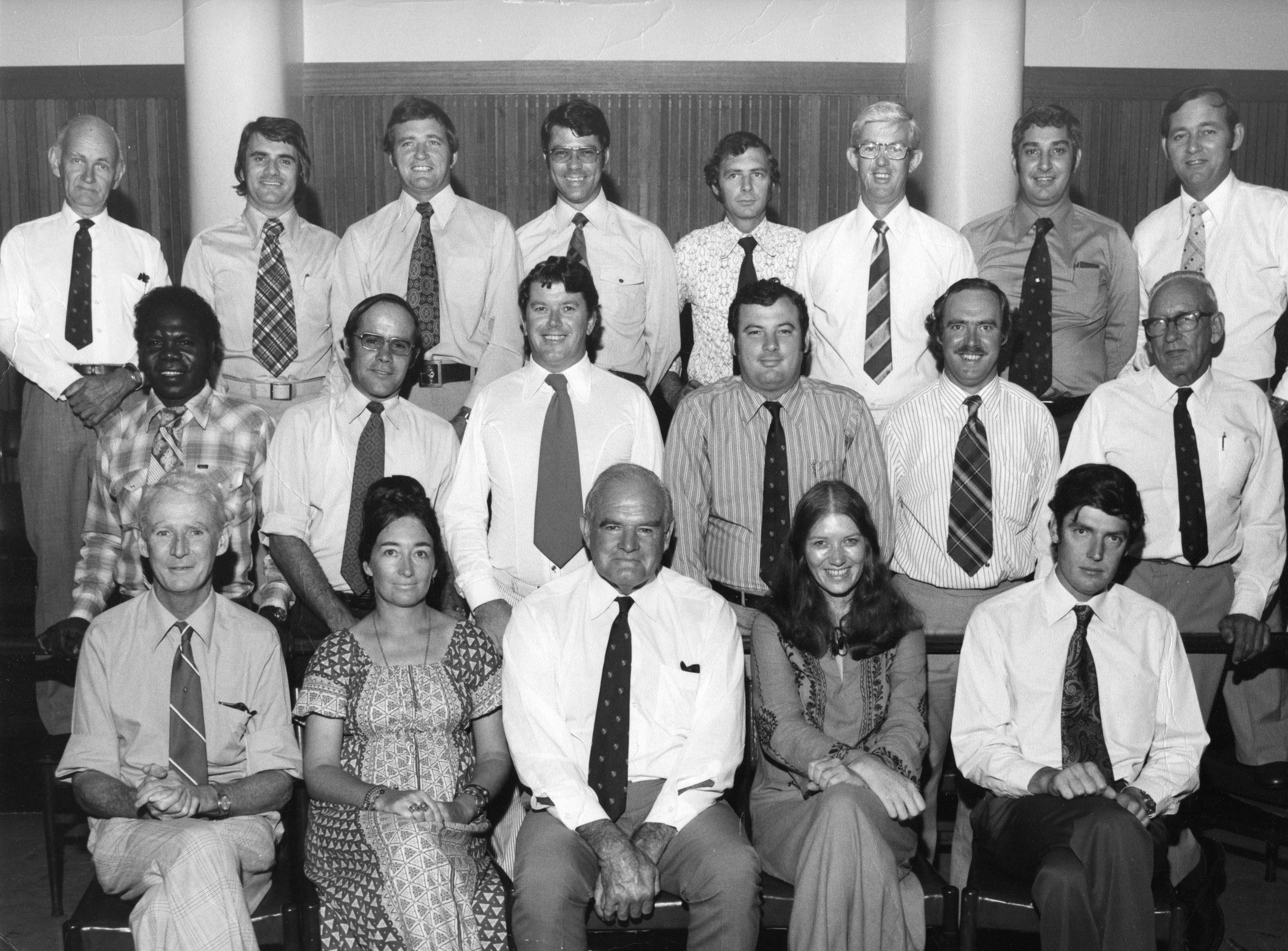
The first Northern Territory Legislative Assembly, 1976

The Legislative Assembly was created in 1974 by the Northern Territory (Administration) Act 1974 (Cth), an act of the Australian federal parliament, which was a fully-elected body in contrast to the Legislative Council. The Legislative Assembly consisted of 19 fully elected members, but initially lacked significant powers, until limited self-government was granted in 1978. For the 1983 election, the number of members was increased to 25.

From its inception prior to the 1974 election until the 2001 election, the Legislative Assembly was controlled by the conservative Country Liberal Party, which since 1979 has been affiliated with the federal Liberal–National coalition. In 2001, the Labor Party won a one-seat majority, and Clare Martin became the Territory's first Labor and first female chief minister. At the 2005 election, the Martin-led ALP won 19 seats to the CLP's 4; however, Martin resigned in 2007 and was succeeded by Paul Henderson as ALP leader, and retained government with another one-seat majority at the 2008 election. Labor lost its majority when Marion Scrymgour went to the cross-benches as an independent. She re-joined the party after Alison Anderson left the party to sit as an independent. Anderson joined the CLP in September 2011. The 2012 election resulted in the return of the CLP under Terry Mills with 16 seats to the ALP's 8. Mills resigned in 2013 and Adam Giles became CLP leader. The CLP was reduced to a one-seat majority in 2014 when three CLP members defected to join the Palmer United Party. One defector later rejoined the CLP. After further defections, CLP numbers fell to minority government status in July 2015.

The 2016 election saw a landslide CLP defeat which brought Labor to power led by Chief Minister Michael Gunner. The position of Speaker of the Northern Territory Legislative Assembly was held by CLP-turned-independent MP Kezia Purick from 23 October 2012. Despite Labor's massive majority following the 2016 election, the incoming Labor government re-appointed Purick as Speaker. Following an ICAC investigation into allegations Kezia Purick had engaged in corrupt conduct, she resigned, and the role was filled by Chansey Paech on 23 June 2020. Following the 2020 election, Paech resigned in September 2020 to serve as a minister in Gunner's cabinet, and Ngaree Ah Kit was acting speaker for a month until her substantive election on 20 October 2020. The 2024 election saw a landslide ALP defeat which brought Labor to power led by Chief Minister Lia Finocchiaro. The position of Speaker of the Northern Territory Legislative Assembly was held by CLP-turned-independent MP Robyn Lambley became Speaker of the Assembly after the CLP won power in 2024.

== See also ==
- Lists of acts of the Legislative Assembly of the Northern Territory
- 2024 Northern Territory general election
- Parliaments of the Australian states and territories
- Members of the Northern Territory Legislative Assembly
- Northern Territory ministries
- List of museums in the Northern Territory
- List of Northern Territory by-elections
- Northern Territory Legislative Council
