= National Parks and Wildlife Act 1974 =

Legislation passed by the New South Wales Parliament

Parliament of New South Wales
- Citation: No. 80 of 1974
- Territorial extent: New South Wales
- Passed: 27 November 1974
- Assented to by: Governor of New South Wales
- Assented to: 27 November 1974
- Commenced: 1 January 1975
- Administered by: Department of Planning and Environment / NSW National Parks and Wildlife Service
- Status: Current legislation

The National Parks and Wildlife Act 1974 is the legislation passed by the New South Wales Parliament with the explicit intent of conserving the natural and cultural heritage of the state of New South Wales; fostering public appreciation, understanding and enjoyment of its natural and cultural heritage; and managing any lands reserved for the purposes of conserving and fostering public appreciation and enjoyment of its natural and cultural heritage.

== Cultural heritage ==
=== Overview ===
The cultural heritage the National Parks and Wildlife Act 1974 seeks to conserve (and foster public appreciation, understanding and enjoyment of) includes "..places, objects and features of significance to Aboriginal people.."; "places of social value to the people of New South Wales.."; and "places of historic, architectural or scientific significance".

=== Aboriginal heritage ===
The National Parks and Wildlife Act 1974 is the primary legislation in New South Wales relied upon within the state to effectively manage and protect the state's Aboriginal cultural heritage

Section 84 provides for a place to be designated an "Aboriginal place", that "is or was of special significance with respect to Aboriginal culture", which enables special protections to be put in place.

== See also ==
- Australian heritage law
- National Parks and Wildlife Service (New South Wales)
