= List of acts of the Legislative Assembly of the Northern Territory from 1989 =

This is a list of acts of the Legislative Assembly of the Northern Territory for the year 1989.

== 1989 ==
Short title, or popular name	Citation	Royal assent
Long title
Oaths Amendment Act 1989	No. 1 of 1989	13 March 1989
An Act to amend the Oaths Act.
Plant Diseases Control Amendment Act 1989	No. 2 of 1989	14 March 1989
Health Practitioners and Allied Professionals Registration Amendment Act 1989	No. 3 of 1989	14 March 1989
Education Amendment Act 1989	No. 4 of 1989	28 March 1989
Business Franchise Amendment Act 1989	No. 5 of 1989	28 March 1989
An Act to amend the Business Franchise Act.
Police Administration Amendment Act 1989	No. 6 of 1989	28 March 1989
Justices Amendment Act 1989	No. 7 of 1989	28 March 1989
Bail Amendment Act 1989	No. 8 of 1989	28 March 1989
Prisoners (Interstate Transfer) Amendment Act 1989	No. 9 of 1989	28 March 1989
Mining Amendment Act 1989	No. 10 of 1989	5 April 1989
An Act to amend the Mining Act.
Petroleum Products Subsidy Amendment Act 1989	No. 11 of 1989	5 April 1989
Racing and Betting Amendment Act 1989	No. 12 of 1989	5 April 1989
Unlawful Betting Act 1989	No. 13 of 1989	5 April 1989
Local Court (Consequential Amendments) Act 1989	No. 14 of 1989	5 June 1989
Financial Administration and Audit Amendment Act 1989	No. 15 of 1989	15 June 1989
An Act to amend the Financial Administration and Audit Act.
Marine Amendment Act 1989	No. 16 of 1989	15 June 1989
Commission of Inquiry (Deaths in Custody) Amendment Act 1989	No. 17 of 1989	15 June 1989
Territory Parks and Wildlife Conservation Amendment Act 1989	No. 18 of 1989	15 June 1989
Petroleum (Submerged Lands) Amendment Act 1989	No. 19 of 1989	15 June 1989
Supply Act 1989-90	No. 20 of 1989	15 June 1989
An Act to make interim provision for the appropriation of money out of the Consolidated Fund for the service of the year ending 30 June 1990.
Racing and Betting Amendment Act (No. 2) 1989	No. 21 of 1989	15 June 1989
National Crime Authority (Territory Provisions) Amendment Act 1989	No. 22 of 1989	15 June 1989
Taxation (Administration) Amendment Act 1989	No. 23 of 1989	15 June 1989
Criminal Law (Conditional Release of Offenders) Amendment Act 1989	No. 24 of 1989	15 June 1989
Traffic Amendment Act 1989	No. 25 of 1989	15 June 1989
An Act to amend the Traffic Act and the Criminal Law (Conditional Release of Offenders) Act.
Stamp Duty Amendment Act 1989	No. 26 of 1989	15 June 1989
Police Administration Amendment Act (No. 2) 1989	No. 27 of 1989	15 June 1989
Poisons and Dangerous Drugs Amendment Act 1989	No. 28 of 1989	21 June 1989
Northern Territory Aboriginal Sacred Sites Act 1989	No. 29 of 1989	23 June 1989
An Act to effect a practical balance between the recognized need to preserve and enhance Aboriginal cultural tradition in relation to certain land in the Territory and the aspirations of the Aboriginal and all other peoples of the Territory for their economic, cultural and social advancement, by establishing a procedure for the protection and registration of sacred sites, providing for entry onto sacred sites and the conditions to which such entry is subject, establishing a procedure for the avoidance of sacred sites in the development and use of land and establishing an Authority for the purposes of the Act and a procedure for the review of decisions of the Authority by the Minister, and for related purposes.
Motor Vehicles Amendment Act 1989	No. 30 of 1989	28 June 1989
An Act to amend the Motor Vehicles Act.
Local Court Act 1989	No. 31 of 1989	28 June 1989
Energy Pipelines Amendment Act 1989	No. 32 of 1989	28 June 1989
Nitmiluk (Katherine Gorge) National Park Act 1989	No. 33 of 1989	4 July 1989
An Act to acknowledge and secure the right of Aboriginals who are the traditional Aboriginal owners of certain land in the Northern Territory of Australia, and certain other Aboriginals, to occupy and use that land, to establish a National park comprising that land to be known as the Nitmiluk (Katherine Gorge) National Park, to provide for the management and control of that Park, and for related purposes.
Legislative Assembly Members' Superannuation Amendment Act 1989	No. 34 of 1989	28 August 1989
Racing and Betting Amendment Act (No. 3) 1989	No. 35 of 1989	20 September 1989
An Act to amend the Racing and Betting Act.
Territory Insurance Office Amendment Act 1989	No. 36 of 1989	20 September 1989
Parole of Prisoners Amendment Act 1989	No. 37 of 1989	20 September 1989
Parole Orders (Transfer) Amendment Act 1989	No. 38 of 1989	20 September 1989
Registration Amendment Act 1989	No. 39 of 1989	20 September 1989
Police Administration Amendment Act (No. 3) 1989	No. 40 of 1989	20 September 1989
An Act to amend the Police Administration Act.
Stamp Duty Amendment Act (No. 2) 1989	No. 41 of 1989	20 September 1989
Taxation (Administration) Amendment Act (No. 2) 1989	No. 42 of 1989	20 September 1989
Business Franchise Amendment Act (No. 2) 1989	No. 43 of 1989	20 September 1989
Criminal Code Amendment Act 1989	No. 44 of 1989	20 September 1989
Legislative Assembly (Powers and Privileges) Amendment Act 1989	No. 45 of 1989	20 September 1989
An Act to amend the Legislative Assembly (Powers and Privileges) Act.
Associations Incorporation Amendment Act 1989	No. 46 of 1989	20 September 1989
Public Employment (Mobility) Act 1989	No. 47 of 1989	20 September 1989
Bushfires Amendment Act 1989	No. 48 of 1989	20 September 1989
Defamation Amendment Act 1989	No. 49 of 1989	20 September 1989
Human Tissue Transplant Amendment Act 1989	No. 50 of 1989	20 September 1989
An Act to amend the Human Tissue Transplant Act.
Motor Accidents (Compensation) Amendment Act 1989	No. 51 of 1989	20 September 1989
Police Administration (Subsequential Amendment) Act 1989	No. 52 of 1989	20 September 1989
Justices Amendment Act (No. 2) 1989	No. 53 of 1989	20 September 1989
Justices (Subsequential Amendment) Act 1989	No. 54 of 1989	20 September 1989
Administration and Probate Amendment Act 1989	No. 55 of 1989	2 October 1989
An Act to amend the Administration and Probate Act.
Casino Licensing and Control Amendment Act 1989	No. 56 of 1989	2 October 1989
Juries Amendment Act 1989	No. 57 of 1989	2 October 1989
Legal Practitioners (Incorporation) Act 1989	No. 58 of 1989	2 October 1989
Real Property Amendment Act 1989	No. 59 of 1989	2 October 1989
Statute Law Revision Act 1989	No. 60 of 1989	2 October 1989
An Act to revise and correct the law of the Territory in minor respects.
Motor Accidents (Compensation) Amendment Act (No. 2) 1989	No. 61 of 1989	26 October 1989
Appropriation Act 1989-90	No. 62 of 1989	7 November 1989
Housing Amendment Act 1989	No. 63 of 1989	7 November 1989
Traffic Amendment Act (No. 2) 1989	No. 64 of 1989	7 November 1989
Financial Institutions Duty Act 1989	No. 65 of 1989	10 November 1989
An Act to impose a duty on receipts by financial institutions and for related purposes.
Real Property Amendment Act (No. 2) 1989	No. 66 of 1989	10 November 1989
Liquor Amendment Act 1989	No. 67 of 1989	16 November 1989
Building Amendment Act 1989	No. 68 of 1989	12 December 1989
Sexual Offences (Evidence and Procedure) Amendment Act 1989	No. 69 of 1989	12 December 1989
Community Welfare Amendment Act 1989	No. 70 of 1989	12 December 1989
An Act to amend the Community Welfare Act.
Criminal Code Amendment Act (No. 2) 1989	No. 71 of 1989	12 December 1989
Water Supply and Sewerage Amendment Act 1989	No. 72 of 1989	12 December 1989
Instruments Amendment Act 1989	No. 73 of 1989	12 December 1989
Land and Business Agents Amendment Act 1989	No. 74 of 1989	12 December 1989
Power and Water Authority Amendment Act 1989	No. 75 of 1989	12 December 1989
An Act to amend the Power and Water Authority Act.
Married Persons (Equality of Status) Act 1989	No. 76 of 1989	12 December 1989
Planning Amendment Act 1989	No. 77 of 1989	12 December 1989
Miscellaneous Acts Amendment (Aboriginal Community Living Areas) Act 1989	No. 78 of 1989	22 December 1989
Crown Lands Amendment Act 1989	No. 79 of 1989	22 December 1989
Stock Diseases Amendment Act 1989	No. 80 of 1989	22 December 1989
An Act to amend the Stock Diseases Act.
Legislative Assembly (Powers and Privileges) Amendment Act (No. 2) 1989	No. 81 of 1989	22 December 1989
An Act to amend the Legislative Assembly (Powers and Privileges) Act.
Hire-Purchase Amendment Act 1989	No. 82 of 1989	22 December 1989
Crimes Compensation Amendment Act 1989	No. 83 of 1989	22 December 1989
Criminal Law (Conditional Release of Offenders) Amendment Act (No. 2) 1989	No. 84 of 1989	22 December 1989
Registration of Interests in Motor Vehicles and Other Goods Act 1989	No. 85 of 1989	22 December 1989
An Act to provide, in relation to motor vehicles and other prescribed goods, for the registration of security interests, the interests of lessors, and the interests of owners under hire-purchase agreements, and for related matters.

== Sources ==
- "legislation.nt.gov.au".
