= List of acts of the Legislative Assembly of the Northern Territory from 1978 =

This is a list of acts of the Legislative Assembly of the Northern Territory for the year 1978.

== 1978 ==
Short title, or popular name	Citation	Royal assent
Long title
Contracts Ordinance 1978	No. 39 of 1978	29 June 1978
An Ordinance relating to the making and execution of contracts affecting the Northern Territory.
Stamp Duty Ordinance 1978	No. 48 of 1978	30 June 1978
An Ordinance relating to the Imposition of Stamp Duty on certain Instruments having a connexion with the Northern Territory.
Transfer of Powers (Self-Government) Ordinance 1978	No. 54 of 1978	1 July 1978
An Ordinance relating to the Transfer to the Northern Territory of certain Executive Powers, including Powers previously transferred to Executive Members of the Legislative Assembly, and to the Revision of certain Laws.
Succession Duties Repeal Ordinance 1978	No. 55 of 1978	1 July 1978
An Ordinance to repeal the Succession Duties Repeal Ordinance 1974 (Note: Succession Duties Repeal Ordinance 1974) and to cease to apply the Succession Duties Act 1893 (Note: Succession Duties Act 1893 (No. 567 (SA))) of the State of South Australia to the Northern Territory as a law of the Territory.
Territory Parks and Wildlife Conservation Ordinance 1978	No. 56 of 1978	1 July 1978
An Ordinance to amend the Territory Parks and Wildlife Conservation Ordinance and for other purposes.
Territory Parks and Wildlife Conservation Ordinance (No. 3) 1978	No. 57 of 1978	1 July 1978
An Ordinance to amend the Territory Parks and Wildlife Conservation Ordinance.
Amendments Incorporation Ordinance 1978	No. 58 of 1978	1 July 1978
An Ordinance to amend the Amendments Incorporation Ordinance.
Interpretation Ordinance 1978	No. 59 of 1978	1 July 1978
An Ordinance for the interpretation of Ordinances and for the shortening of their language and for other purposes.
Ombudsman (Northern Territory) Ordinance 1978	No. 60 of 1978	1 July 1978
An Ordinance to amend the Ombudsman (Northern Territory) Ordinance.
Law Officers Ordinance 1978	No. 61 of 1978	1 July 1978
An Ordinance relating to the Attorney-General, Solicitor-General and to the Crown Solicitor.
Mining Ordinance (No. 2) 1978	No. 62 of 1978	1 July 1978
An Ordinance to amend the Mining Ordinance.
Juries Ordinance 1978	No. 63 of 1978	1 July 1978
An Ordinance to amend the Juries Ordinance.
Criminal Law and Procedure Ordinance 1978	No. 64 of 1978	1 July 1978
An Ordinance relating to Offences.
Legislative Assembly (Remuneration of Members) Ordinance 1978	No. 65 of 1978	5 July 1978
An Ordinance relating to the remuneration payable to members of the Legislative Assembly.
Mines Regulation Ordinance 1978	No. 66 of 1978	13 July 1978
An Ordinance to amend the Mines Regulation Ordinance.
Public Trustee Ordinance 1978	No. 67 of 1978	13 July 1978
An Ordinance to amend the Public Trustee Ordinance.
Criminal Law (Conditional Release of Offenders) Ordinance 1978	No. 68 of 1978	13 July 1978
An Ordinance to amend the Criminal Law (Conditional Release of Offenders) Ordinance.
Crown Lands Ordinance (No. 2) 1978	No. 69 of 1978	13 July 1978
An Ordinance to amend the Crown Lands Ordinance.
Local Government Ordinance (No. 3) 1978	No. 70 of 1978	13 July 1978
An Ordinance to amend the Local Government Ordinance.
Dangerous Drugs Ordinance 1978	No. 71 of 1978	26 July 1978
An Ordinance to amend the Dangerous Drugs Ordinance.
Prohibited Drugs Ordinance 1978	No. 72 of 1978	26 July 1978
An Ordinance to amend the Prohibited Drugs Ordinance.
Inspection of Machinery Ordinance 1978	No. 73 of 1978	26 July 1978
An Ordinance to amend the Inspection of Machinery Ordinance.
Uniting Church in Australia Ordinance 1978	No. 74 of 1978	26 July 1978
An Ordinance to amend the Uniting Church in Australia Ordnance.
Weights and Measures Ordinance 1978	No. 75 of 1978	26 July 1978
An Ordinance relating to Weights and Measures.
Weights and Measures (Packaged Goods) Ordinance 1978	No. 76 of 1978	26 July 1978
An Ordinance to amend the Weights and Measures (Packaged Goods) Ordinance.
Workmen's Compensation Ordinance 1978	No. 77 of 1978	26 July 1978
An Ordinance to amend the Workmen's Compensation Ordinance.
Interpretation Act (No. 2) 1978	No. 78 of 1978	23 August 1978
An Act To amend the Interpretation Ordinance.
Soccer Football Pools Act 1978	No. 79 of 1978	23 August 1978
An Act to provide for the promotion, conduct and operation of soccer football pools.
Companies Act 1978	No. 80 of 1978	23 August 1978
An Act to amend the Companies Ordinance.
Electrical Workers and Contractors Act (No. 2) 1978	No. 81 of 1978	23 August 1978
An Act to amend the Electrical Workers and Contractors Ordinance.
Legislative Assembly (Remuneration of Members) Act (No. 2) 1978	No. 82 of 1978	23 August 1978
An Act to amend the Legislative Assembly (Remuneration of Members) Ordinance. (Note: Legislative Assembly (Remuneration of Members) Ordinance 1978 (No. 65))
Licensing Act (No. 2) 1978	No. 83 of 1978	23 August 1978
An Act to amend the Licensing Ordinance.
Hire-Purchase Act 1978	No. 84 of 1978	23 August 1978
An Act to amend the Hire-Purchase Ordinance.
Registration of Births, Deaths and Marriages Act 1978	No. 85 of 1978	23 August 1978
An Act to amend the Registration of Births, Deaths and Marriages Ordinance.
Tourist Board Act (No. 2) 1978	No. 86 of 1978	23 August 1978
An Act To amend the Tourist Board Ordinance.
Radiation (Safety Control) Ordinance 1978	No. 87 of 1978	23 August 1978
An Ordinance relating to the Control, Regulation, Possession, Use and Transport of Radioactive Substances and Irradiating Apparatus.
Construction Safety Ordinance 1978	No. 88 of 1978	23 August 1978
An Ordinance to amend the Construction Safety Ordinance. (Note: Construction Safety Ordinance 1975 (No. 101 of 1978))
Financial Administration and Audit Act (No. 2) 1978	No. 89 of 1978	5 September 1978
An Act to amend the Financial Administration and Audit Ordinance.
Motor Vehicles Act (No. 4) 1978	No. 90 of 1978	5 September 1978
An Act to amend the Motor Vehicles Ordinance.
Northern Territory Disasters Act 1978	No. 91 of 1978	5 September 1978
An Act to amend the Northern Territory Disasters Ordinance.
Public Trustee Act (No. 2) 1978	No. 92 of 1978	5 September 1978
An Act to amend the Public Trustee Ordinance.
Real Property Act 1978	No. 93 of 1978	5 September 1978
An Act to amend The Real Property Act and Ordinance/
Stamp Duty Act (No. 2) 1978	No. 94 of 1978	5 September 1978
An Act to amend the Stamp Duty Ordinance.
Statute Law Revision Act 1978	No. 95 of 1978	5 September 1978
An Act relating to the revision of certain statutes.
Taxation (Administration) Act (No. 2) 1978	No. 96 of 1978	5 September 1978
An Act to amend the Taxation (Administration) Ordinance.
Encouragement of Primary Production (Validation of Actions) Act 1978	No. 97 of 1978	13 October 1978
An Act to validate certain actions of the Primary Producers Board.
Stamp Duty Act (No. 3) 1978	No. 98 of 1978	13 October 1978
An Act to amend the Stamp Duty Act.
Dangerous Drugs Act (No. 2) 1978	No. 99 of 1978	13 October 1978
An Act to amend the Dangerous Drugs Ordinance.
Construction Safety Ordinance 1975	No. 100 of 1978	21 September 1978 (Note: Royal assent was delayed as this ordinance was reserved for assent by the Commonwealth Government.)
An Ordinance relating to the Safety and Welfare of Persons engaged in Construction and other Work and for other purposes.
Construction Safety Ordinance 1976	No. 102 of 1978	21 September 1978
An Ordinance to amend the Construction Safety Ordinance.
Legislative Assembly (Remuneration, Allowances and Entitlements) Act 1978	No. 103 of 1978	18 October 1978
An Act relating to the Remuneration, Allowances and Entitlements payable to certain persons.
Registration of Births, Deaths and Marriages Act (No. 2) 1978	No. 104 of 1978	3 November 1978
An Act to amend the Registration of Births, Deaths and Marriages Ordinance.
Firearms Ordinance (No. 2) 1975	No. 105 of 1978	21 September 1978
An Ordinance to amend the Firearms Ordinance 1956 (Note: Firearms Ordinance 1956 (No. 8)) as amended.
Aboriginal Land Ordinance 1978	No. 106 of 1978	9 November 1978
An Ordinance to provide for access to Aboriginal land and the seas adjacent thereto.
Crown Lands Ordinance (No. 3) 1978	No. 107 of 1978	9 November 1978
An Ordinance to amend the Crown Lands Ordinance.
Special Purposes Leases Ordinance (No. 2) 1978	No. 108 of 1978	9 November 1978
An Ordinance to amend the Special Purposes Leases Ordinance.
Cemeteries Act 1978	No. 109 of 1978	9 November 1978
An Ordinance to amend the Cemeteries Ordinance.
Social Welfare Ordinance 1978	No. 110 of 1978	9 November 1978
An Ordinance to amend the Social Welfare Ordinance.
Mining Ordinance (No. 3) 1978	No. 111 of 1978	9 November 1978
An Ordinance to amend the Mining Ordinance.
Territory Parks and Wildlife Conservation Ordinance (No. 2) 1978	No. 112 of 1978	9 November 1978
An Ordinance to amend the Territory Parks and Wildlife Conservation Ordinance.
Petroleum (Prospecting and Mining) Ordinance 1978	No. 113 of 1978	9 November 1978
An Ordinance to amend the Petroleum (Prospecting and Mining) Ordinance.
Coal Ordinance 1978	No. 114 of 1978	9 November 1978
An Ordinance to amend the Coal Ordinance.
Aboriginal Sacred Sites Ordinance 1978	No. 115 of 1978	9 November 1978
An Ordinance to provide for the protection of Aboriginal Sacred Sites
Aboriginal Sacred Sites Act (No. 2) 1978	No. 116 of 1978	9 November 1978
An Act to amend the Aboriginal Sacred Sites Act. (Note: Aboriginal Sacred Sites Ordinance 1978 (No. 115))
Law Officers Act (No. 2) 1978	No. 117 of 1978	9 November 1978
An Act to amend the Law Officers Ordinance. (Note: Law Officers Ordinance 1978 (No. 61))
Legislative Assembly (Remuneration, Allowances and Entitlements) Act (No. 2) 1978	No. 118 of 1978	29 November 1978
An Act to amend the Legislative Assembly (Remuneration, Allowances and Entitlements) Act. (Note: Legislative Assembly (Remuneration, Allowances and Entitlements) Act 1978 (No. 103))
Appropriation Act (No. 1) 1978-79	No. 119 of 1978	30 November 1978
An Act to appropriate certain sums out of the Consolidated Fund for the service of the year ending on 30 June 1979.
Appropriation Application Act 1978	No. 120 of 1978	30 November 1978
An Act to defer the application of certain moneys.
Criminal Law Consolidation Act (No. 2) 1978	No. 121 of 1978	18 December 1978
An Act to amend the Criminal Law Consolidation Act.
Transfer of Powers (Health) Act 1978	No. 122 of 1978	21 December 1978
An Act relating to the Transfer to the Northern Territory of certain Executive Powers with respect to Health.
Hospitals and Medical Services Act 1978	No. 123 of 1978	21 December 1978
An Act to amend the Hospitals and Medical Services Act.
Poisons Act 1978	No. 124 of 1978	21 December 1978
An Act to amend the Poisons Act.
Absconding Debtors Act 1978	No. 125 of 1978	21 December 1978
An Act to make provision for and in respect of the Apprehension of certain Debtors.
Criminal Law and Procedure Act (No. 2) 1978	No. 126 of 1978	21 December 1978
An Act to amend the Criminal Law and Procedure Ordinance.
Criminal Law Consolidation Act 1978	No. 127 of 1978	21 December 1978
An Act to amend the Criminal Law Consolidation Act and Ordinance.
Explosives Act 1978	No. 128 of 1978	21 December 1978
An Act to amend the Explosives Act.
Fisheries Act (No. 2) 1978	No. 129 of 1978	21 December 1978
An Act to amend the Fisheries Act.
Territory Parks and Wildlife Conservation Act (No. 4) 1978	No. 130 of 1978	21 December 1978
An Act to amend the Territory Parks and Wildlife Conservation Ordinance.
Traffic Act (No. 2) 1978	No. 131 of 1978	21 December 1978
An Act to amend the Traffic Act.
Traffic Act (No. 3) 1978	No. 132 of 1978	21 December 1978
An Act to amend the Traffic Act.
Casino Development Act 1978	No. 133 of 1978	21 December 1978
An Act to approve of the Erection and Licensing of Casinos.
Lottery and Gaming Act (No. 4) 1978	No. 134 of 1978	21 December 1978
An Act to amend the Lottery and Gaming Act.

== Sources ==
- "legislation.nt.gov.au".
