= List of acts of the Legislative Assembly of the Northern Territory from 1995 =

This is a list of acts of the Legislative Assembly of the Northern Territory for the year 1995.

== 1995 ==
Short title, or popular name	Citation	Royal assent
Long title
Traffic Amendment Act (No. 2) 1994	No. 1 of 1995	9 February 1995
An Act to amend the Traffic Act.
Audit Act 1995	No. 2 of 1995	21 March 1995
Procurement Act 1995	No. 3 of 1995	21 March 1995
Financial Management Act 1995	No. 4 of 1995	21 March 1995
Financial Management (Consequential Amendments) Act 1995	No. 5 of 1995	21 March 1995
Appropriation Act (No. 2) 1994-95	No. 6 of 1995	22 March 1995
Medical Act 1995	No. 7 of 1995	10 April 1995
Medical Consequential Amendments Act 1995	No. 8 of 1995	10 April 1995
Mine Management Amendment Act 1995	No. 9 of 1995	10 April 1995
Legal Practitioners Amendment Act 1995	No. 10 of 1995	12 April 1995
An Act to amend the Legal Practitioners Act.
Corporations (Northern Territory) Amendment Act 1995	No. 11 of 1995	12 April 1995
An Act to amend the Corporations (Northern Territory) Act.
Rights of the Terminally Ill Act 1995	No. 12 of 1995	16 June 1995
An Act to confirm the right of a terminally ill person to request assistance from a medically qualified person to voluntarily terminate his or her life in a humane manner; to allow for such assistance to be given in certain circumstances without legal Impediment to the person rendering the assistance; to provide procedural protection against the possibility of abuse of the rights recognised by this Act; and for related purposes.
Trustee Amendment Act 1995	No. 13 of 1995	26 June 1995
Statute Law Revision Act 1995	No. 14 of 1995	23 June 1995
An Act to revise and correct the law of the Territory in minor aspects.
Appropriation Act 1995-96	No. 15 of 1995	26 June 1995
Control of Roads Amendment Act 1995	No. 16 of 1995	26 June 1995
Work Health Amendment Act 1995	No. 17 of 1995	26 June 1995
Juvenile Justice Amendment Act 1995	No. 18 of 1995	26 June 1995
Racing and Betting Amendment Act 1995	No. 19 of 1995	26 June 1995
Agents Licensing Amendment Act 1995	No. 20 of 1995	26 June 1995
An Act to amend the Agents Licensing Act.
Lands Acquisition Amendment Act 1995	No. 21 of 1995	26 June 1995
Ombudsman (Northern Territory) Amendment Act 1995	No. 22 of 1995	26 June 1995
Motor Vehicles Amendment Act 1995	No. 23 of 1995	26 June 1995
Road Transport Charges (Northern Territory) Act 1995	No. 24 of 1995	26 June 1995
Road Transport Reform (Vehicles and Traffic) (Northern Territory) Act 1995	No. 25 of 1995	26 June 1995
Mining Assistance Act Repeal Act 1995	No. 26 of 1995	26 June 1995
Liquefied Petroleum Gas (Subsidy) Repeal Act 1995	No. 27 of 1995	26 June 1995
Retirement Villages Act 1995	No. 28 of 1995	26 June 1995
Energy Resource Consumption Levy Amendment Act 1995	No. 29 of 1995	26 June 1995
Business Franchise Amendment Act 1995	No. 30 of 1995	26 June 1995
An Act to amend the Business Franchise Act.
Stamp Duty Amendment Act 1995	No. 31 of 1995	26 June 1995
Gaming Control Amendment Act 1995	No. 32 of 1995	25 August 1995
Poisons and Dangerous Drugs Amendment Act 1995	No. 33 of 1995	7 September 1995
Trade Measurement Administration Act 1995	No. 34 of 1995	12 September 1995
Local Government Amendment Act 1995	No. 35 of 1995	12 September 1995
Local Government Amendment Act (No. 2) 1995	No. 36 of 1995	12 September 1995
Northern Territory Electoral Act 1995	No. 37 of 1995	12 September 1995
Consumer Credit (Northern Territory) Act 1995	No. 38 of 1995	12 September 1995
Sentencing Act 1995	No. 39 of 1995	29 September 1995
Petroleum (Submerged Lands) Amendment Act 1995	No. 40 of 1995	29 September 1995
An Act to amend the Petroleum (Submerged Lands) Act.
Associations Incorporation Amendment Act 1995	No. 41 of 1995	29 September 1995
Statute Law Revision Act (No. 2) 1995	No. 42 of 1995	13 October 1995
An Act to revise and correct the law of the Territory in minor aspects.
Conservation Commission Amendment Act 1995	No. 43 of 1995	15 November 1995
Gaming Control Amendment Act (No. 2) 1995	No. 44 of 1995	15 November 1995
Northern Territory Products Symbol Amendment Act 1995	No. 45 of 1995	15 November 1995
Parks and Wildlife Commission (Consequential Amendments) Act 1995	No. 46 of 1995	13 December 1995
Racing and Betting Amendment Act (No. 2) 1995	No. 47 of 1995	15 November 1995
Stamp Duty Amendment Act (No. 2) 1995	No. 48 of 1995	15 November 1995
Taxation (Administration) Amendment Act 1995	No. 49 of 1995	15 December 1995
Gaming Machine Act 1995	No. 50 of 1995	22 November 1995
An Act to provide for the regulation and control of gaming machines and for related purposes.
Abattoirs and Slaughtering Amendment Act 1995	No. 51 of 1995	28 December 1995
Brands Amendment Act 1995	No. 52 of 1995	28 December 1995
Classification of Publications and Films Amendment Act 1995	No. 53 of 1995	28 December 1995
Community Welfare Amendment Act 1995	No. 54 of 1995	28 December 1995
Criminal Code Amendment Act 1995	No. 55 of 1995	28 December 1995
Lands Acquisition Amendment Act (No. 2) 1995	No. 56 of 1995	28 December 1995
Local Government Amendment Act (No. 3) 1995	No. 57 of 1995	28 December 1995
Poisons and Dangerous Drugs Amendment Act (No. 2) 1995	No. 58 of 1995	28 December 1995
Private Security Act 1995	No. 59 of 1995	28 December 1995
Trustee Amendment Act (No. 2) 1995	No. 60 of 1995	28 December 1995
An Act to amend the Trustee Act.
Summary Offences Amendment Act 1995	No. 61 of 1995	28 December 1995
Summary Offences Amendment Act (No. 2) 1995	No. 62 of 1995	28 December 1995
Criminal Code Amendment Act (No. 2) 1995	No. 63 of 1995	28 December 1995
Summary Offences Amendment Act (No. 3) 1995	No. 64 of 1995	29 December 1995
An Act to amend the Summary Offences Act.

== Sources ==
- "legislation.nt.gov.au".
