= Australian Aboriginal sacred site =

Places deemed significant and meaningful by Aboriginal Australians based on their beliefs

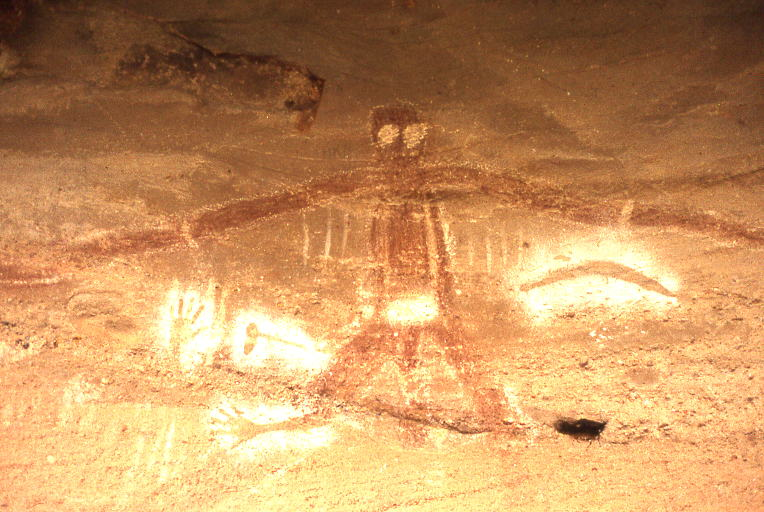
Baiame Cave, Milbrodale, New South Wales

An Australian Aboriginal sacred site is a place deemed significant and meaningful by Aboriginal Australians based on their beliefs. It may include any feature in the landscape, and in coastal areas, these may lie underwater. The site's status is derived from an association with some aspect of social and cultural tradition, which is related to ancestral beings, collectively known as Dreamtime (or the Dreaming/s), who created both physical and social aspects of the world. The site may have its access restricted based on gender, clan or other Aboriginal grouping, or other factors.

The sites are protected by various state- and territory-based legislation as part of Australian heritage laws, and the federal Aboriginal and Torres Strait Islander Heritage Protection Act 1984 can be invoked as a "last resort" if the site is not considered adequately covered by legislation in the jurisdiction. The legislation also protects sites of archaeological, historical and cultural significance relating to Aboriginal peoples that may be unrelated to beliefs, and more commonly thought of as Aboriginal Australian heritage sites. States and territories maintain registers of sites of Indigenous significance with searchable online databases. Despite the legislation, some sites are still threatened by mining and other operations. One notable example in recent times was the culturally and archaeologically significant rock shelter at Juukan Gorge in the Pilbara, destroyed by Rio Tinto's blasting in the course of mining exploration in May 2020.

== Land and The Dreaming ==
The Aboriginal population of Australia is made up of hundreds of peoples or nations, each with their own sacred places, animal totems and other items in the geographic area known as their country, or traditional lands.

Sacred sites are places within the landscape that have a special significance under Aboriginal tradition. Hills, rocks, waterholes, trees, plains and other natural features may be sacred sites. In coastal and sea areas, sacred sites may include features which lie both above and below water. Sometimes sacred sites are obvious, such as ochre deposits, rock art galleries, or spectacular natural features. In other instances sacred sites may be unremarkable to an outside observer. They can range in size from a single stone or plant, to an entire mountain range.

The concept of "The Dreaming" or "Dreamtime" is inadequately explained by these English terms, and difficult to explain in terms of non-Indigenous cultures. Often referred to as the Warlpiri name Jukurrpa, It has been described as "an all-embracing concept that provides rules for living, a moral code, as well as rules for interacting with the natural environment... [it] provides for a total, integrated way of life... a lived daily reality". It embraces past, present and future, and some of the ancestor or spirit beings inhabiting the Dreamtime become one with parts of the landscape, such as rocks or trees. The concept of a life force is also often associated with sacred sites, and ceremonies performed at such sites "are a re-creation of the events which created the site during The Dreaming". The ceremony helps the life force at the site to remain active and to keep creating new life: if not performed, new life cannot be created.

== Traditional custodians and management ==
The traditional custodians of the sacred sites in an area are the tribal elders. "Sacred sites give meaning to the natural landscape. They anchor values and kin-based relationships in the land. Custodians of sacred sites are concerned for the safety of all people, and the protection of sacred sites is integral to ensuring the well-being of the country and the wider community." These sites are or were used for many sacred traditions and customs. Sites used for male activities, such as initiation ceremonies, may be forbidden to women; sites used for female activities, such as giving birth, may be forbidden to men.

== Some examples ==
Some documented examples of Aboriginal sacred and heritage sites in Australia include:

- Baiame's Cave: south of Singleton, New South Wales
- Ban Ban Springs: near Gayndah, Queensland
- Kakadu National Park, Northern Territory was first inscribed on the List of World Heritage Sites in Oceania in 1981.
- Kurtonitj and other places within the Budj Bim heritage areas
- Willandra Lakes Region was inscribed on the World Heritage List in 1981 and included in the National Heritage List on 21 May 2007.
- Murujuga (a.k.a. Burrup Peninsula or Dampier Peninsula): in the Pilbara Western Australia.
- Uluru-Kata Tjuta National Park was added to the World Heritage List for cultural values in 1994 and is "associated with events, living traditions, ideas and beliefs".

== Legislation ==
Before 1965 there was no legislation protecting Aboriginal and Torres Strait Islander sites in Australia, with the exception of some regulations in the Northern Territory. In 1965, the South Australian Government was the first to introduce legislation (with the Aboriginal and Historic Relics Preservation Act 1965), and all other states have since done so. Sacred sites are given protection under both Commonwealth and state and territory laws.

The Environment Protection and Biodiversity Conservation Act 1999 (EPBC Act) established the National Heritage List, which includes natural, Indigenous and historic places of outstanding heritage value to the nation. Under this Act there are penalties for anyone who takes an action that has or will have a significant impact on the Indigenous heritage values of a place that is recognised in the National Heritage List.

Indigenous heritage protected to varying degrees by state and territory laws: they protect various kinds of areas and objects, but developers can apply for a permit to allow them to undertake activities which may affect such land or objects.

Legislation relating to the protection and management of sacred sites and other Indigenous heritage items and places in Australia includes:

Jurisdiction	Legislation
Commonwealth (Aust)	Aboriginal Land Rights (Northern Territory) Act 1976; Aboriginal and Torres Strait Islander Heritage Protection Act 1984; Protection of Movable Cultural Heritage Act 1986; Native Title Act 1993; Environment Protection and Biodiversity Conservation Act 1999
Australian Capital Territory	Heritage Act 2004
New South Wales	National Parks and Wildlife Amendment (Aboriginal Ownership) Act 1996; Heritage Act 1977
Northern Territory	Northern Territory Aboriginal Sacred Sites Act 1989; Aboriginal Land Act 1978; Heritage Act 2011
Queensland	Aboriginal Cultural Heritage Act 2003; Torres Strait Islander Cultural Heritage Act 2003
South Australia	Aboriginal Heritage Act 1988
Tasmania	Aboriginal Heritage 1975 (Updated version of the Aboriginal Relics Act 1975, commencing 16 August 2017.)
Victoria	Aboriginal Heritage Act 2006; Heritage Act 2017 (Updated version of the Heritage Act 1995, commencing 1 November 2017.)
Western Australia	Aboriginal Heritage Act 1972

== Online registers ==
Searchable online lists of sacred and Indigenous heritage sites are maintained by all states and territories under their legislation. Not all of them are publicly accessible, but logins can be obtained on application. They include:

- ACT: The ACT Heritage Register is a general register, which includes Indigenous heritage. Publicly accessible.
- NSW: The Aboriginal Heritage Information Management System (AHIMS) contains detailed information on over 93,000 recorded sites and over 13,500 archaeological and cultural heritage assessment reports
- Northern Territory: Heritage Register maintained by the NT Department of Lands, Planning and Environment
- Queensland: Aboriginal and Torres Strait Islander Cultural Heritage Database and Register
- South Australia: Register of Aboriginal Sites and Objects
- Tasmania: The Aboriginal Heritage Register has over 13,000 places and objects on its database.
- Victoria: The Aboriginal Cultural Heritage Register and Information System (ACHRIS) is the online tool that is used to access the Victorian Aboriginal Heritage Register.
- Western Australia: The Aboriginal Heritage Inquiry System (AHIS) is publicly available and information about sites is accessible via an interactive map.

== Destruction of Juukan Gorge ==
In May 2020, in order to expand an iron ore mine, Rio Tinto demolished a sacred cave in the Pilbara region of Western Australia that had evidence of 46,000 years of continual human occupation. The rock shelter known as Juukan 2 was the only inland site in Australia to show signs of continuous human occupation through the Ice Age, and had been described as one of the "top five" most significant in the whole of the Pilbara region, and of "the highest archaeological significance in Australia", being "[the only] site of this age with faunal remains in unequivocal association with stone tools". In addition, it was of great cultural significance to the Puutu Kunti Kurrama and Pinikura, with a hair of one of their ancestors having been found there.

Permission to destroy the site had been given in 2013 under the Aboriginal Heritage Act 1972 (WA), although later information about the site's significance had been given to the company. The destruction brought widespread criticism, and sparked an internal review at Rio Tinto, a review of the Aboriginal Heritage Act, and a government inquiry by the Joint Standing Committee on Northern Australia.

On 11 September 2020, it was announced that, as a result of the destruction at Juukan Gorge, CEO Jean-Sebastien Jacques and two other Rio Tinto executives would step down. The National Native Title Council (NNTC) welcomed the move, but said that there should be an independent review into the company's procedures and culture to ensure that such an incident could never happen again. Rio Tinto admitted their error, issued an apology via media and on their website, and also committed to building relationships with the traditional owners as well as getting Indigenous people into leadership roles in the company. One analysis of what went wrong in Rio Tinto to allow the destruction to occur suggested that processes failed at several levels, but mainly due to its "segmented organisational structure", a poor reporting structure, and Indigenous relations not being properly represented at a high enough level.

== Threats to heritage sites ==
=== WA ===
"Blanket approvals" under Section 18 of WA's Aboriginal Heritage Act have been granted by the Government of Western Australia to mining companies which could be a threat to the safety of many other sites in the Pilbara and Goldfields regions of Western Australia. Aboriginal people have no power to object to such approvals, which allows corporations to disturb or destroy sites across wide areas. One example is the 148 square kilometres (57 sq mi) of Ngalia land in the Goldfields which contains seven sacred sites, and an area which includes 40 Banjima sites in the Djadjiling Range in the Pilbara.

=== Canberra development ===
As of June 2020, the federal government has approved plans by a developer for a residential complex near Mount Ainslie in Canberra, on a site that has been deemed of Indigenous significance by archaeologists at the Geological Society of Australia and Geoheritage Australasia. The government has not consulted with local elders or Aboriginal organisations, and a Department of Agriculture, Water and the Environment spokesperson said that it had not assessed the site for its Indigenous heritage (under heritage provisions of the EPBC Act) "as no world or national heritage sites were identified on the location". However, local Ngambri people say it was used for sacred men's business; in addition, artefacts found there in 1933 are of enough significance to be displayed in the British Museum.

=== Dunoon dam, NSW ===
Rous County Council, which is the authority responsible for the water supply for most of the Ballina, Byron, Lismore and Richmond Valley council areas, published its draft water strategy in June 2020, which includes a 50-gigalitre (1.8×10^{9} cu ft) dam at Dunoon, about 20 kilometres (12 mi) north of Lismore. The council has been aware of Indigenous concerns since the matter was first considered in the 1990s, and was committed to working with local communities to mitigate concerns. An impact assessment of the site had identified various artefacts and burial sites in the area.

== Gunlom Falls ==
As of September 2020, the walking track to the lookout and pools above the Gunlom Falls in Kakadu National Park is closed at the request of the Jawoyn traditional owners. It was closed before mid-2019, due to an investigation by the Aboriginal Areas Protection Authority (AAPA) into Parks Australia under the Northern Territory Aboriginal Sacred Sites Act 1989 (NT). The traditional owners allege that, in the process of upgrading the track, Parks Australia may have damaged a sacred site near the track. AAPA has filed charges, which could lead to the authority being fined up to A$314,000.

== In the media ==
In June 2008 BBC released the series Ray Mears Goes Walkabout, composed of four episodes, where Mears tours the Australian outback. An accompanying hardcover book was published in the UK by Hodder and Stoughton in March 2008. In the series, Mears meets one of his heroes, Les Hiddins (a.k.a. "The Bush Tucker Man"), and he also headed to the Kimberley region to meet the reputed Aboriginal artist and bush guide Juju Wilson.

== See also ==
- Aboriginal Areas Protection Authority (NT)
- Aboriginal sites of New South Wales
- Aboriginal Heritage Act (disambiguation), various state legislation to protect sites
- Australian heritage law, general heritage laws across Australia
- Customary Aboriginal law
- Hindmarsh Island bridge controversy
- National Indigenous Heritage Art Award (1993–2000)
- Rock art § Australia
