= List of acts of the Legislative Assembly of the Northern Territory from 2005 =

This is a list of acts of the Legislative Assembly of the Northern Territory for the year 2005.

== 2005 ==
Short title, or popular name	Citation	Royal assent
Long title
Sentencing Amendment (Aboriginal Customary Law) Act 2004	No. 1 of 2005	14 January 2005
An Act to amend the Sentencing Act.
Lake Bennett (Land Title) Act 2005	No. 2 of 2005	18 February 2005
An Act about the rights and interests of persons in certain land in the Lake Bennett locality.
Parks and Reserves (Framework for the Future) (Revival) Act 2005	No. 3 of 2005	4 March 2005
Territory Parks and Wildlife Conservation Amendment Act 2005	No. 4 of 2005	4 March 2005
Taxation (Administration) Amendment (Objections and Appeals) Act 2005	No. 5 of 2005	4 March 2005
Australian Crime Commission (Northern Territory) Act 2005	No. 6 of 2005	17 March 2005
Australian Crime Commission (Consequential Amendments) Act 2005	No. 7 of 2005	17 March 2005
Building Amendment Act 2005	No. 8 of 2005	17 March 2005
Construction Industry Long Service Leave and Benefits Act 2005	No. 9 of 2005	17 March 2005
Marine Amendment Act 2005	No. 10 of 2005	17 March 2005
An Act to amend the Marine Act.
Police Administration Amendment (Powers and Liability) Act 2005	No. 11 of 2005	17 March 2005
Planning Amendment Act 2005	No. 12 of 2005	17 March 2005
Criminal Code Amendment Act 2005	No. 13 of 2005	17 March 2005
Residential Tenancies Amendment Act 2005	No. 14 of 2005	17 March 2005
Darwin Port Corporation Amendment Act 2005	No. 15 of 2005	17 March 2005
Legal Practitioners Amendment Act 2005	No. 16 of 2005	5 May 2005
Housing Amendment Act 2005	No. 17 of 2005	5 May 2005
Proportionate Liability Act 2005	No. 18 of 2005	5 May 2005
Standard Time Act 2005	No. 19 of 2005	5 May 2005
An Act about standard time.
Justice Portfolio (Miscellaneous Amendments) Act 2005	No. 20 of 2005	6 May 2005
An Act to amend and repeal various Acts administered by the Minister for Justice and Attorney-General.
Classification of Publications, Films and Computer Games Amendment Act 2005	No. 21 of 2005	6 May 2005
Volatile Substance Abuse Prevention Act 2005	No. 22 of 2005	6 May 2005
Trans-Territory Pipeline and Blacktip Gas Projects (Special Provsions) Act 2005	No. 23 of 2005	6 May 2005
Misuse of Drugs Amendment Act 2005	No. 24 of 2005	6 May 2005
Supply Act 2005-2006	No. 25 of 2005	30 June 2005
Appropriation Act 2005-2006	No. 26 of 2005	18 July 2005
Pay-roll Tax Amendment Act 2005	No. 27 of 2005	18 July 2005
Taxation (Administration) Amendment Act 2005	No. 28 of 2005	18 July 2005
Stamp Duty Amendment Act 2005	No. 29 of 2005	18 July 2005
Batchelor Institute of Indigenous Tertiary Education Amendment Act 2005	No. 30 of 2005	26 August 2005
An Act to amend the Batchelor Institute of Indigenous Tertiary Education Act.
Charles Darwin University Amendment Act 2005	No. 31 of 2005	26 August 2005
Youth Justice Act 2005	No. 32 of 2005	22 September 2005
Youth Justice (Consequential Amendments) Act 2005	No. 33 of 2005	22 September 2005
Bail Amendment (Repeat Offenders) Act 2005	No. 34 of 2005	22 September 2005
Cemeteries Amendment Act 2005	No. 35 of 2005	21 October 2005
Magistrates Amendment Act 2005	No. 36 of 2005	22 November 2005
Criminal Code Amendment (Criminal Responsibility Reform) Act 2005	No. 37 of 2005	22 November 2005
Domestic Violence Amendment (Police Orders) Act 2005	No. 38 of 2005	22 November 2005
Legislation Repeal Act 2005	No. 39 of 2005	22 November 2005
Community Justice Centre Act 2005	No. 40 of 2005	13 December 2005
An Act to establish the Northern Territory Community Justice Centre, and for related purposes.
Housing Amendment Act (No. 2) 2005	No. 41 of 2005	13 December 2005
Northern Territory Aboriginal Sacred Sites Amendment Act 2005	No. 42 of 2005	14 December 2005
Petroleum (Submerged Lands) Amendment Act 2005	No. 43 of 2005	14 December 2005
Statute Law Revision Act 2005	No. 44 of 2005	14 December 2005
An Act to revise and correct the law of the Territory in minor respects.
Strehlow Research Centre Act 2005	No. 45 of 2005	14 December 2005
Territory Insurance Office Amendment Act 2005	No. 46 of 2005	14 December 2005
Veterinarians Amendment (Fees and Penalties) Act 2005	No. 47 of 2005	14 December 2005
Weapons Control Amendment Act 2005	No. 48 of 2005	14 December 2005
An Act to amend the Weapons Control Act.

== Sources ==
- "legislation.nt.gov.au".
