= List of acts of the Legislative Assembly of the Northern Territory from 2026 =

This is a list of acts of the Legislative Assembly of the Northern Territory for the year 2026.

== 2026 ==
Short title, or popular name	Citation	Royal assent
Long title
Care and Protection of Children Amendment (Worker Screening) Act 2026	No. 1 of 2026	9 February 2026
An Act to amend the Care and Protection of Children Act 2007. (Note: Care and Protection of Children Act 2007 (No. 37))
Trade, Business and Asian Relations Legislation Amendment (Streamlining Licensing Schemes and Other Matters) Act 2026	No. 2 of 2026	9 February 2026
An Act to amend the Agents Licensing Act 1979, (Note: Agents Licensing Act 1979) the Agents Licensing Regulations 1979, the Associations Act 2003, (Note: Associations Act 2003 (No. 56)) the Associations Regulations 2004, the Commercial and Private Agents Licensing Act 1979, (Note: Commercial and Private Agents Licensing Act 1979 (No. 41)) the Consumer Affairs and Fair Trading Act 1990, (Note: Consumer Affairs and Fair Trading Act 1990 (No. 49)) the Consumer Affairs and Fair Trading (Pawnbrokers and Second-hand Dealers) Regulations 1998, the Essential Goods and Services Act 1981, (Note: Essential Goods and Services Act 1981 (No. 99)) the Plumbers and Drainers Licensing Act 1983, (Note: Plumbers and Drainers Licensing Act 1983 (No. 70)) the Private Security Act 1995 (Note: Private Security Act 1995 (No. 59)) and the Tobacco Control Act 2002. (Note: Tobacco Control Act 2002 (No. 68))
Statute Law Revision and Repeals Act 2026	No. 3 of 2026	9 February 2026
An Act to revise the statute law of the Northern Territory and to repeal legislation that is spent or no longer required.
Housing Amendment Act 2026	No. 4 of 2026	9 February 2026
An Act to amend the Housing Act 1982. (Note: Housing Act 1982 (No. 76))

== Sources ==
- "legislation.nt.gov.au".
