= List of acts of the Legislative Assembly of the Northern Territory from 2019 =

This is a list of acts of the Legislative Assembly of the Northern Territory for the year 2019.

== 2019 ==
Short title, or popular name	Citation	Royal assent
Long title
Justice Legislation Amendment Act 2019	No. 1 of 2019	22 February 2019
An Act to amend the Director of Public Prosecutions Act 1990, (Note: Director of Public Prosecutions Act 1990) the Law Officers Act 1978, (Note: Law Officers Ordinance 1978 (No. 61)) the Local Court Act 2015 (Note: Local Court Act 2015) and the Supreme Court Act 1979. (Note: Supreme Court Act 1979)
Nuclear Waste Transport, Storage and Disposal (Prohibition) Amendment Act 2019	No. 2 of 2019	27 February 2019
Superannuation Legislation Amendment Act 2019	No. 3 of 2019	27 February 2019
Tobacco Control Legislation Amendment Act 2019	No. 4 of 2019	27 February 2019
Liquor Amendment Act 2019	No. 5 of 2019	26 March 2019
An Act to amend the Liquor Act.
Agents and Land Legislation Amendment Act 2019	No. 6 of 2019	28 March 2019
Youth Justice Amendment Act 2019	No. 7 of 2019	28 March 2019
Health Services Amendment Act 2019	No. 8 of 2019	28 March 2019
Criminal Code Amendment Act 2019	No. 9 of 2019	28 March 2019
Criminal Code Further Amendment Act 2019	No. 10 of 2019	28 March 2019
An Act to amend the Criminal Code Act 1983. (Note: Criminal Code Act 1983)
Electoral Legislation Amendment Act 2019	No. 11 of 2019	9 April 2019
Petroleum Legislation Amendment Act 2019	No. 12 of 2019	9 April 2019
Licensed Surveyors Amendment Act 2019	No. 13 of 2019	9 April 2019
Public Information Legislation Amendment Act 2019	No. 14 of 2019	9 April 2019
National Disability Insurance Scheme (Authorisations) Act 2019	No. 15 of 2019	27 May 2019
An Act to provide for the authorisation of restrictive practices for participants in the National Disability Insurance Scheme.
Teacher Registration (Northern Territory) Legislation Amendment Act 2019	No. 16 of 2019	27 May 2019
Medical Services Amendment Act 2019	No. 17 of 2019	30 May 2019
Motor Accidents (Compensation) Amendment Act 2019	No. 18 of 2019	30 May 2019
Water Amendment Act 2019	No. 19 of 2019	30 May 2019
Appropriation (2019-2020) Act 2019	No. 20 of 2019	21 June 2019
An Act to authorise an amount to be paid from the Central Holding Authority for the financial year ending 30 June 2020.
Property Activation Act 2019	No. 21 of 2019	21 June 2019
Revenue Legislation Amendment Act 2019	No. 22 of 2019	21 June 2019
Integrity and Accountability Legislation Amendment Act 2019	No. 23 of 2019	9 August 2019
Care and Protection of Children Amendment Act 2019	No. 24 of 2019	2 September 2019
Hemp Industry Act 2019	No. 25 of 2019	2 September 2019
An Act to regulate the development and operation of a hemp industry.
Water Legislation Miscellaneous Amendments Act 2019	No. 26 of 2019	2 September 2019
Construction Contracts (Security of Payments) Legislation Amendment Act 2019	No. 27 of 2019	3 September 2019
Education and Care Services (National Uniform Legislation) Amendment Act 2019	No. 28 of 2019	3 September 2019
Liquor Act 2019	No. 29 of 2019	3 September 2019
An Act to govern the sale, supply, service, promotion and consumption of all forms of liquor and alcohol products for the purpose of minimising their associated harm and for related purposes.
Electoral Legislation Further Amendment Act 2019	No. 30 of 2019	9 October 2019
An Act to amend the Electoral Act 2004, (Note: Electoral Act 2004) the Local Government Act 2008 (Note: Local Government Act 2008) and the Electoral Regulations 2004.
Environment Protection Act 2019	No. 31 of 2019	9 October 2019
Youth Justice and Related Legislation Amendment Act 2019	No. 32 of 2019	9 October 2019
Statute Law Revision and Repeals Act 2019	No. 33 of 2019	6 November 2019
An Act to make miscellaneous minor amendments to various laws, to repeal legislation that is spent or no longer required and for related purposes.
Territory Parks and Wildlife Conservation Amendment Act 2019	No. 34 of 2019	6 November 2019
Transport Legislation Amendment Act 2019	No. 35 of 2019	6 November 2019
An Act to amend the Control of Roads Act 1953, (Note: Control of Roads Ordinance 1953 (No. 8)) the Motor Vehicles Act 1949 (Note: Motor Vehicles Ordinance 1949 (No. 15)) and the Traffic Act 1987. (Note: Traffic Act 1987)
Water Further Amendment Act 2019	No. 36 of 2019	6 November 2019
Work Health and Safety (National Uniform Legislation) Amendment Act 2019	No. 37 of 2019	10 December 2019
Firearms Legislation Amendment Act 2019	No. 38 of 2019	13 December 2019
Local Government Act 2019	No. 39 of 2019	13 December 2019
An Act to provide for, and regulate, local government, and for related purposes.
Sex Industry Act 2019	No. 40 of 2019	13 December 2019
An Act provide for a regulatory framework for the sex industry.

== Sources ==
- "legislation.nt.gov.au".
