= Kurrama people =

Aboriginal Australian people of the Pilbara, Western Australia

The Kurrama people, also known as the Puutu Kunti Kurrama people, are an Aboriginal Australian people from the Pilbara region of Western Australia.

The Puutu Kunti Kurrama and Pinikura peoples, although of different language groups, are represented by the PKKP Aboriginal Corporation in the administration of their traditional lands.

== Language ==
The Kurrama language is a member of the Ngayarta group of the Pama–Nyungan language family, and is closely related to Yinjtjiparnti. The language is endangered, with only an estimated 10 speakers remaining (2002).

== Country ==
Norman Tindale estimated the extent of their lands as covering 9,600 square kilometres (3,700 sq mi). Their eastern boundaries were around Mount McCrae, while the southern limits touched the headwaters of Duck Creek and the upper Hardey River at Rocklea. The land includes much of the higher plateaus of the Hamersley Range in the Pilbara region of Western Australia.

=== Native title ===
The Puutu Kunti Kurrama and Pinikura, who are two separate but related peoples, lodged a joint claim for recognition for each of their own countries as well as a shared area. Their rights to lands and waters covering around 10,888 square kilometres (4,204 sq mi) of an area between Onslow and Tom Price (though not reaching either place), were recognised on 2 December 2015, in the #1 and #2 v State of Western Australia decision. The PKKP Aboriginal Corporation is the representative body administering the lands for both peoples.

== Social organisation ==
Kurrama initiation required youths to undergo both circumcision and subincision.

Although each group is distinct, the Kurruma and Pinikura peoples observe common laws and customs, and share and protect much of the same land and resources.

== Alternative names and spellings ==
- Jawunmara (Yindjibarndi exonym)
- Gurama
- Kerama, Karama, Korama
- Jana:ri

== Juukan Gorge destruction ==
The Puutu Kunti Kurrama people, in alliance with the Pinikura in a group abbreviated as PKKP, were distressed by the destruction of a sacred and heritage site in the form of a cave in Juukan Gorge by mining giant Rio Tinto in May 2020.

== Sources ==
- "About PKKP". PKKP Aboriginal Corporation.
- "AIATSIS map of Indigenous Australia". AIATSIS.
- "Country and Region". PKKP Aboriginal Corporation.(map)
- Dixon, Robert M. W. (2002). Australian Languages: Their Nature and Development. Vol. 1. Cambridge University Press. ISBN 978-0-521-47378-1.
- "Kurrama". Wangka Maya Pilbara Aboriginal Language Centre. 2017. Archived from the original on 7 November 2017.
- "Tindale Tribal Boundaries" (PDF). Department of Aboriginal Affairs, Western Australia. September 2016. Archived from the original (PDF) on 8 March 2016.
- Tindale, Norman Barnett (1974). "Kurama (WA)". Aboriginal Tribes of Australia: Their Terrain, Environmental Controls, Distribution, Limits, and Proper Names. Australian National University. ISBN 978-0-708-10741-6. Archived from the original on 20 March 2020.
- Wahlquist, Calla (26 May 2020). "Rio Tinto blasts 46,000-year-old Aboriginal site to expand iron ore mine". The Guardian.
