= List of acts of the Legislative Assembly of the Northern Territory from 2025 =

This is a list of acts of the Legislative Assembly of the Northern Territory for the year 2025.

== 2025 ==
Short title, or popular name	Citation	Royal assent
Long title
Payroll Tax Amendment Act 2025	No. 1 of 2025	18 February 2025
An Act to amend the Payroll Tax Act 2009. (Note: Payroll Tax Act 2009)
Liquor Legislation Amendment (Repeal of Minimum Pricing) Act 2025	No. 2 of 2025	18 February 2025
Correctional Services Legislation Amendment Act 2025	No. 3 of 2025	18 February 2025
Territory Coordinator Act 2025	No. 4 of 2025	24 March 2025
An Act to provide for the appointment of a Territory Coordinator, to facilitate the undertaking of significant projects and works, to provide for the designation of infrastructure coordination areas and Territory development areas, to expedite certain statutory processes and decisions and for related purposes.
Education Legislation Amendment Act 2025	No. 5 of 2025	3 April 2025
Fiscal Integrity and Transparency Amendment Act 2025	No. 6 of 2025	3 April 2025
Petroleum, Planning and Water Legislation Amendment Act 2025	No. 7 of 2025	7 April 2025
Police Administration Legislation Amendment Act 2025	No. 8 of 2025	7 April 2025
Bail and Youth Justice Legislation Amendment Act 2025	No. 9 of 2025	30 April 2025
Portable Long Service Leave (Community Services Sector) Repeal Act 2025	No. 10 of 2025	29 May 2025
An Act to repeal the Portable Long Service Leave (Community Services Sector) Act 2024. (Note: Portable Long Service Leave (Community Services Sector) Act 2024)
Northern Territory Aboriginal Sacred Sites Legislation Amendment Act 2025	No. 11 of 2025	29 May 2025
Domestic and Family Violence and Victims Legislation Amendment Act 2025	No. 12 of 2025	6 June 2025
Water Amendment (Aboriginal Water Reserves) Act 2025	No. 13 of 2025	6 June 2025
Attorney-General Legislation Amendment Act 2025	No. 14 of 2025	6 June 2025
An Act to amend legislation administered by the Attorney-General.
Local Government Legislation Amendment Act 2025	No. 15 of 2025	6 June 2025
Appropriation (2025-2026) Act 2025	No. 16 of 2025	26 June 2025
An Act to authorise an amount to be paid from the Central Holding Authority for the financial year ending 30 June 2026.
Revenue Legislation Amendment Act 2025	No. 17 of 2025	26 June 2025
Public Information Amendment Act 2025	No. 18 of 2025	10 August 2025
Racing and Wagering Amendment Act 2025	No. 19 of 2025	10 August 2025
Defamation Legislation Amendment Act 2025	No. 20 of 2025	10 August 2025
An Act to amend the Defamation Act 2006, (Note: Defamation Act 2006) the Limitation Act 1981 (Note: Limitation Act 1981) and the Local Court (Criminal Procedure) Act 1928. (Note: Local Court (Criminal Procedure) Act 1928)
Youth Justice Legislation Amendment Act 2025	No. 21 of 2025	11 August 2025
Animal Protection and Related Legislation Amendment Act 2025	No. 22 of 2025	12 September 2025
Transport Legislation Amendment Act 2025	No. 23 of 2025	12 September 2025
Gaming Control Amendment (Community Benefit Fund) Act 2025	No. 24 of 2025	12 September 2025
Lands, Planning and Environment Legislation Amendment Act 2025	No. 25 of 2025	12 September 2025
Police Administration Amendment (Police Public Safety Officers) Act 2025	No. 26 of 2025	12 September 2025
Anti-Discrimination Amendment Act 2025	No. 27 of 2025	30 October 2025
Environment Protection (Beverage Containers and Plastic Bags) Legislation Amendment (Expansion of CDS and Other Matters) Act 2025	No. 28 of 2025	30 October 2025
An Act to amend the Environment Protection (Beverage Containers and Plastic Bags) Act 2011 (Note: Environment Protection (Beverage Containers and Plastic Bags) Act 2011) and the Environment Protection (Beverage Containers and Plastic Bags) Regulations 2011.
First Home Owner Grant Amendment (Extension of Scheme) Act 2025	No. 29 of 2025	30 October 2025
An Act to amend the First Home Owner Grant Act 2000. (Note: First Home Owner Grant Act 2000)
Electricity System and Market Operator Act 2025	No. 30 of 2025	30 October 2025
An Act to establish the Northern Territory Electricity System and Market Operator and for related purposes.
Electricity Legislation Amendment (Market Reform) Act 2025	No. 31 of 2025	30 October 2025
An Act to amend the Electricity Reform Act 2000 (Note: Electricity Reform Act 2000) and the National Electricity (Northern Territory) (National Uniform Legislation) Act 2015. (Note: National Electricity (Northern Territory) (National Uniform Legislation) Act 2015)
Integrity and Ethics Commissioner Act 2025	No. 32 of 2025	27 November 2025
An Act to promote integrity and ethics in the public sector and health sector by establishing the positions of Integrity and Ethics Commissioner and Integrity and Ethics Oversight Inspector and for related purposes.
Teacher Registration (Northern Territory) Legislation Amendment Act 2025	No. 33 of 2025	5 December 2025
An Act to amend the Teacher Registration (Northern Territory) Act 2004 (Note: Teacher Registration (Northern Territory) Act 2004) and the Teacher Registration (Northern Territory) Regulations 2004.
Tourism NT Amendment (Integration of NTMEC) Act 2025	No. 34 of 2025	5 December 2025
An Act to amend the Tourism NT Act 2012 (Note: Tourism NT Act 2012) and for related purposes.
Attorney-General and Police Legislation Amendment Act 2025	No. 35 of 2025	5 December 2025
An Act to amend the Firearms Act 1997, (Note: Firearms Act 1997) the Information Act 2002, (Note: Information Act 2002) the Police Administration Act 1978 (Note: Police Administration Act 1978) and the Public Trustee Act 1979. (Note: Public Trustee Act 1979)
Housing, Transport and Surveillance Devices Legislation Amendment (Police Public Safety Officers) Act 2025	No. 36 of 2025	5 December 2025
An Act to amend the Housing Act 1982, (Note: Housing Act 1982) the Housing Regulations 1983, the Public Transport (Passenger Safety) Act 2008, (Note: Public Transport (Passenger Safety) Act 2008) the Surveillance Devices Regulations 2008 and for related purposes.
Building Legislation Amendment (Fidelity Fund) Act 2025	No. 37 of 2025	5 December 2025
An Act to amend the Building Act 1993 (Note: Building Act 1993) and the Building (RBI and Fidelity Fund Schemes) Regulations 2012.
Alcohol Harm Reduction Amendment (Banned Drinker Orders) Act 2025	No. 38 of 2025	5 December 2025
An Act to amend the Alcohol Harm Reduction Act 2017. (Note: Alcohol Harm Reduction Act 2017)

== Sources ==
- "legislation.nt.gov.au".
