= Binigura =

Aboriginal Australian people of the Pilbara, Western Australia

The Binigura people, these days usually spelt Pinikura, are an Aboriginal Australian people of the Pilbara region of Western Australia.

== Country ==
The Binigura in Norman Tindale's calculation, held sway over some 8,000 square kilometres (3,100 sq mi) of tribal land, centred on the Ashburton River from Mount Tom Price to Kooline. Their northern boundary lay around the areas of Mount Amy, Urandy, and the start of the Duck Creek uplands. Their eastern confine is traced to the lower headwaters of the Hardey River, on the western edges of Ashburton Downs.

=== Native title ===
The Puutu Kunti Kurrama and Pinikura, who are two separate but related peoples, lodged a joint claim for recognition for each of their own countries as well as a shared area. Their rights to lands and waters covering around 10,888 square kilometres (4,204 sq mi) of an area between Onslow and Tom Price (though not reaching either place), were recognised on 2 December 2015, in the #1 and #2 v State of Western Australia decision. The PKKP Aboriginal Corporation is the representative body administering the lands for both peoples.

== Language ==
The Binigura/Pinikura language is a close relative of the Thalanyji language.

== Social organisation ==
Although each group is distinct, the Kurruma and Pinikura peoples observe common laws and customs, and share and protect much of the same land and resources.

== Juukan Gorge destruction ==
The Pinikura people, in alliance with the Puutu Kunti Kurrama in a group abbreviated as PKKP, were distressed by the destruction of a sacred and heritage site in the form of a cave in Juukan Gorge by mining giant Rio Tinto in May 2020.

== Alternative names ==
Other variants of the name as supplied by Tindale are:

- Biniguru
- Binnigoora
- Binnigora
- Pinikurra

== Sources ==
- "AIATSIS map of Indigenous Australia". AIATSIS. 14 May 2024.
- "Tindale Tribal Boundaries" (PDF). Department of Aboriginal Affairs, Western Australia. September 2016. Archived from the original (PDF) on 8 March 2016.
- Tindale, Norman Barnett (1974). "Binigura (WA)". Aboriginal Tribes of Australia: Their Terrain, Environmental Controls, Distribution, Limits, and Proper Names. Australian National University. ISBN 978-0-708-10741-6. Archived from the original on 14 March 2018.
