= Aboriginal Heritage Act 1988 =

South Australian legislation

The Aboriginal Heritage Act 1988 (AHA) is the principal South Australian legislation protecting and preserving the state's Aboriginal heritage. It repealed and replaced the Aboriginal and Historic Relics Preservation Act 1965, which was the first state legislation to protect Aboriginal Australian heritage in Australia.

The Aboriginal Affairs and Reconciliation Division of the South Australian South Australian Department of the Premier and Cabinet has responsibility for managing this legislation, so ensuring that South Australia's Aboriginal heritage is protected, preserved, and transmitted into the future.

== 1996 Evatt Review ==
During 1996, the Hon. Elizabeth Evatt AC carried out a comprehensive review of the Australian Government's then Aboriginal and Torres Strait Islander Heritage Protection Act 1984 (Cwlth), and, in the process, reviewed the Aboriginal heritage protection arrangements of each state. As part of Evatt's review the following observations were made about South Australia's Aboriginal Heritage Act 1988:

=== Background to the state law ===
The Act makes it a crime to damage broadly defined classes of Aboriginal heritage without first obtaining the authority of the Minister responsible for the Act.

The Act vests the powers to protect and preserve Aboriginal heritage in the Minister responsible for the Act, who is required to take such measures as are practicable for protecting a preserving Aboriginal sites, objects and remains.

=== Aboriginal heritage protected ===
The Act had was judged to be "..one of the broadest definitions of Aboriginal cultural heritage in any of the Australian State and Territory laws..". It was also acknowledged as being the only legislation outside the Australian Capital Territory to expressly recognise that Aboriginal traditions may change over time.

Aboriginal sites and Aboriginal objects are defined as those:

that are of significance according to Aboriginal tradition, or that are of significance to Aboriginal archaeology, anthropology or history.

Aboriginal tradition is defined as:

traditions, observances, customs, or beliefs of the people who inhabited Australia before European colonisation and includes traditions, observances, customs and beliefs that have evolved or developed from that tradition since European colonisation.

This legislation therefore covers both sacred sites and sites of anthropological, historical or archaeological importance.

=== Criminal sanctions ===
Within South Australia it is a criminal offence to:

- excavate land uncovering Aboriginal sites, objects or remains without the Minister's authority;
- damage Aboriginal sites, objects or remains without authority;
- fail to report the discovery of an Aboriginal site or object or remains to the Minister (though this obligation does not apply to tourists, hikers, and other non-land owners/occupiers)
- fail to comply with directions the responsible Minister may give (in the form of a notice to interested parties) prohibiting or restricting access to Aboriginal sites, objects or remains.

The Act applies to all individuals and corporate entities in the state, including the state itself, at risk of individual fines greater than A$10,000, and corporate fines greater than A$50,000. Only Aboriginal peoples themselves are exempt, if their actions are in accordance with relevant Aboriginal traditions.

== See also ==
- Australian heritage law
- Australian Aboriginal sacred site
- Aboriginal South Australians
