= Aboriginal Cultural Heritage Act 2021 =

Law governing the protection of Aboriginal cultural sites in Western Australia

Parliament of Western Australia
- Long title: An Act about Aboriginal cultural heritage; and to repeal the Aboriginal Heritage Act 1972 and the Aboriginal Heritage (Marandoo) Act 1992; and to make consequential and other amendments to various Acts; and for related purposes.
- Citation: Act No 27 of 2021
- Territorial extent: State of Western Australia
- Royal assent: 22 December 2021
- Repealed: 15 November 2023
- Administered by: Attorney-General of Western Australia

Legislative history
- Bill title: Aboriginal Cultural Heritage Bill 2021
- Bill citation: Bill 56 of 2021
- Introduced by: Dr A. D. Buti MLA, Minister for Finance
- First reading: 17 November 2021
- Second reading: 17 November 2021
- Third reading: 23 November 2021
- Member(s) in charge: Stephen Dawson MLC, Minister for Aboriginal Affairs
- First reading: 30 November 2021
- Second reading: 30 November 2021
- Third reading: 14 December 2021

Amends
- Aboriginal Heritage Act 1972; Conservation and Land Management Act 1974

Amended by
- Aboriginal Heritage Legislation Amendment and Repeal Bill 2023
- Status: Repealed

The Aboriginal Cultural Heritage Act 2021 (ACH Act) was a law in the state of Western Australia governing the protection of Aboriginal cultural sites. It superseded the Aboriginal Heritage Act 1972 on 1 July 2023. On 8 August 2023, the Government of Western Australia announced the act would be repealed and the 1972 act reinstated. Some people saw a link between repealing the act and the incoming 2023 Australian Indigenous Voice referendum.

== Background ==
The legislation followed a government inquiry into the destruction of an ancient heritage site, Juukan Gorge, by mining company Rio Tinto in May 2020. The process included discussions with Aboriginal people, industry experts, and the larger community. The act was repealed on 15 November 2023 with the passing of the Aboriginal Heritage Legislation Amendment and Repeal Act 2023.

== Description ==
The act sought to give traditional owners increased influence in decisions over Aboriginal heritage management. Local Aboriginal cultural-heritage, native-title and other relevant bodies would play a critical role in managing and surveying heritage locations.

== Concerns ==
Owing to the legislation's complexity, education workshops were held by the Department of Planning, Lands and Heritage, attended by hundreds of people. There were calls to delay the implementation of the legislation for six months to allow a longer period for landholders to become acquainted with their responsibilities. Nearly a month after its implementation, the planning authorities were receiving numerous phone calls and emails from farmers. Many were from users of the land looking for clarification about what activities were permitted under the new act, others wanted general advice, or technical assistance with the online service. Concerns remained about the legislation's lack of clarity, as pastoralists did not want to inadvertently break the law.

Some 29,000 petitioners called on the government to delay implementation of the law.

The Pastoralists and Graziers Association of Western Australia opposed the law.
