= Aboriginal Heritage Act 1972 =

Current law in Western Australia

Parliament of Western Australia
- Long title: An Act to make provision for the preservation of places and objects customarily used by or traditional to the original inhabitants of Australia or their descendants, or associated therewith, and for other purposes incidental thereto.
- Territorial extent: State of Western Australia
- Assented to: 2 October 1972
- Administered by: Attorney-General of Western Australia
- Status: Current legislation

The Aboriginal Heritage Act 1972 (AHA) is a law in the state of Western Australia governing the protection of Aboriginal cultural sites. The Aboriginal Cultural Heritage Act 2021 (ACH Act) was intended to replace the act from 1 July 2023 but was revoked after only five weeks of operation.

The AHA protects all Aboriginal cultural heritage in Western Australia, whether or not heritage sites are registered or mapped by the Department of Planning, Lands, and Heritage. Under the act the Minister for Aboriginal Affairs has the power to grant approval for any activity which would negatively impact Aboriginal heritage sites. Under the AHA, Aboriginal sites of outstanding importance can be declared Protected Areas. The AHA also provides protection for Aboriginal objects.

== Juukan Gorge destruction ==
After the mining company Rio Tinto blew up the 46,000-year old caves in Juukan Gorge on 24 May 2020, which was legal under a section 18 exemption of the act, WA Aboriginal Affairs Minister Ben Wyatt started a review of the act.

The interim report of a bipartisan parliamentary inquiry into the incident published on 9 December 2020, entitled Never Again, makes several recommendations, including a halt to all actions presently occurring under Section 18 of the AHA, and a moratorium on Section 18 applications. It also recommends that the Western Australian Government review and reform the current state heritage laws, and that the federal government review the Aboriginal and Torres Strait Islander Heritage Protection Act 1984. It also outlines deficiencies in the Aboriginal Heritage Act 1972.

== Transition to ACH Act ==
There was a transitional period of around 18 months before the Aboriginal Cultural Heritage Act 2021 came into force, while the various regulations and processes were developed. In February 2022 there was a reference group appointed to assist in the co-design process. The new law did away with the approval process determined by Section 18, and put traditional owners into a more powerful position in the decision-making process. The transition to the ACH Act ultimately failed as it was repealed soon after going into effect.
