= Aboriginal Areas Protection Authority =

Statutory body of the Northern Territory

The Aboriginal Areas Protection Authority (AAPA) is an independent statutory authority established under the Northern Territory Aboriginal Sacred Sites Act 1989. Its function is to protect Aboriginal sacred sites within the Northern Territory of Australia.

The 1989 act originated in a 1977 bill, signed into law as the Aboriginal Sacred Sites Ordinance 1978 in November 1978, soon after the NT achieved self-government, and the Aboriginal Sacred Sites Authority was created. The legislation became a subject of controversy among developers, the Northern Territory Government and the new authority. Numerous amendments were proposed and debated, including its compatibility with the Aboriginal Land Rights (Northern Territory) Act 1976 (Cth), before the Northern Territory Aboriginal Sacred Sites Act 1989 was passed on 26 May 1989, coming into force on 15 August 1989. This act created the Aboriginal Areas Protection Authority, which included new functions and expanded its work, and also introduced various measures to increase accountability.

AAPA works with traditional owners to record "sites of physical, spiritual and cultural significance" on its Register of Sacred Sites. Prospective land developers are legally obliged to apply for an Authority Certificate through AAPA. It is governed by a board of 12 people, mostly senior Aboriginal custodians. The authority board is made up of two members appointed by the NT Government, and five male and five female Aboriginal custodians nominated by the four NT Aboriginal Land Councils.
