= Juukan Gorge =

Gorge in Western Australia, known for ancient human habitation

Coordinates: 22°37′03″S 117°09′28″E

Location of Juukan Gorge

Juukan Gorge is a gorge in the Hamersley Range in the Pilbara region of Western Australia, about 60 kilometres (37 mi) from Tom Price. The gorge is known primarily for a cave that was the only inland site in Australia with evidence of continuous human occupation for over 46,000 years, including through the last Ice Age. The cave was permanently destroyed by mining company Rio Tinto in May 2020. Ministerial consent had been given to expand Rio Tinto's mine in 2013 under Western Australian legislation.

Prior to its destruction, the cave in Juukan Gorge was an ancient site that had been excavated several times with the help of the traditional owners of the land, the Puutu Kunti Kurrama and Pinikura (Binigura) peoples. As part of reparations to the Traditional Owners by Rio Tinto, plans are underway for a full-size replica of the Juukan Gorge rock shelters to be built at the site.

== Background ==
Juukan Gorge was given this name by the daughter of Puutu Kunti Kurrama man Juukan, also known as Tommy Ashburton, who was born at Jukarinya (Mount Brockman).

== Archaeological significance ==
=== General ===
The archaeological significance of the Juukan Gorge was known at least since 2009, when it was described as "two rock shelters with Aboriginal occupation starting at least 32,000 years ago and extending throughout the Last Glacial period". Prior to its destruction, the cave in Juukan Gorge was an ancient site that had been excavated several times with the help of the traditional owners of the land, the Puutu Kunti Kurrama and Pinikura (Binigura) peoples.

Rio Tinto received ministerial consent to mine the site in 2013 in the pursuit of expanding their iron ore mining operations. A year later, an archaeological dig discovered the site was much older than previously thought, at around 46,000 years old, and rich in cultural artefact including animal bones in middens showing changes in the local fauna, grindstones and various sacred objects. One particularly significant finding was a length of plaited human hair, woven together from strands from the heads of several different people, about 4,000 years old. DNA testing revealed that the hair had belonged to the direct ancestors of Puutu Kunti Kurrama and Pinikura (PKKP) people alive today.

PKKP heritage manager Heather Builth told Rio Tinto that the site was one of the "top five" most significant in the whole of the Pilbara region, and archaeologist Michael Slack had told them that one of the rock shelters, Juukan 2, was of "the highest archaeological significance in Australia", saying that its significance "could not be overstated", being "[the only] site of this age with faunal remains in unequivocal association with stone tools".

=== Ongoing work since 2020 ===
After the destruction of ancient rock shelter overlooking the gorge in 2020, a team of archaeologists led by Michael Slack were commissioned by the PKKP to carry out a full excavation of the site. As of October 2026 they continue to excavate and examine artefacts under a large tent. Bedrock has been exposed by the blast, and archaeologists have found around 50,000 artefacts, an unusually high number for any site. Some have been dated back to around 50,000 years ago.

Artefacts include finely-crafted stone cutting tools, including one with a spinifex resin handle, dated to around 3,000 years ago. A remnant of a baler shell shows that trading took place in the coastal region, at least 350 km (220 mi) away, and the artefacts help to demonstrate the page of movement into the arid regions of Australia by Aboriginal peoples, after arriving in the north. The archaeologists have identified the remains of about 200 fires, and what may have been paperbark bedding. They also found tens of thousands of bone fragments, and proof that Tasmanian devils once roamed the desert regions before becoming extinct on the Mainland Australia 3,200 years ago.

== Cave destruction ==
The cave was ultimately destroyed with explosives on 24 May 2020 as part of Rio Tinto's expansion of the Brockman 4 mine. This was despite the PKKP having said many times that they wanted to preserve the site and having issued an urgent request to halt the blasts five days beforehand. The Aboriginal Heritage Act 1972 (WA) does not allow for mining consent to be renegotiated on the basis of new information, and the blasting was legal under a Section 18 exemption in the Act. Western Australian Aboriginal Affairs Minister Ben Wyatt was as of August 2020 reviewing the Act.

During the parliamentary inquiry, the Registrar of Aboriginal sites explained that the traditional owners did not object to the blast before it was too late. Ministerial consent had been granted in 2013.

== Rio Tinto response ==
Rio Tinto's logo

After this aroused widespread international media coverage and public outcry, Rio Tinto apologised to the Puutu Kunti Kurrama and the Pinikura peoples for the destruction of the caves and for causing distress. The CEO of the iron ore group apologised on behalf of the company on 17 June. The National Native Title Council (NNTC) issued a request to the federal government asking for national legislation for Indigenous cultural heritage.

A Rio Tinto board internal review under Michael L'Estrange, an independent non-executive director of Rio Tinto and former Australian high commissioner to the UK, ascribed the mistake to a series of flaws in their systems, sharing of information, engaging with the Indigenous people and decision-making, and promised to implement new measures, including,

the need for a greater prioritisation of partnerships and relationships with Traditional Owners and First Nations people from senior operational leaders and teams [...].

On 11 September 2020, it was announced that, as a result of the destruction at Juukan Gorge, CEO Jean-Sébastien Jacques and two other Rio Tinto executives would step down. The National Native Title Council (NNTC) welcomed the move, but said that there should be an independent review into the company's procedures and culture to ensure that such an incident could never happen again. Rio Tinto admitted their error, issued an apology via media and on their website, and also committed to building relationships with the traditional owners as well as getting Indigenous people into leadership roles in the company. One analysis of what went wrong in Rio Tinto to allow the destruction to occur suggested that processes failed at several levels, but mainly due to its "segmented organisational structure", a poor reporting structure, and Indigenous relations not being properly represented at a high enough level. Simon Thompson, chairman of Rio Tinto corporation, announced on 3 March 2021 that he would resign despite record profits.

No politician was held accountable for the destruction of the Juukan caves.

== Parliamentary inquiry ==
The "Inquiry into the destruction of 46,000-year-old caves at the Juukan Gorge in the Pilbara region of Western Australia" was referred to the Joint Standing Committee on Northern Australia on 11 June 2020, to report by 20 September 2020. Rio Tinto appeared before the inquiry in August and admitted that it did not advise the traditional owners of other options besides blasting. Senior executives did not learn of the significance of the site until 21 May. The chair, Liberal MP Warren Entsch, requested permission from Premier of Western Australia Mark McGowan for a small group of politicians and staff to travel to the region in order to have face-to-face hearings with traditional owners early in September. Hansard will ensure accurate reporting of the meetings, and extra precautions are necessary because of the COVID-19 pandemic in Australia.

Apart from Entsch, the members of the Inquiry were:

- Senator Anthony Chisholm (Deputy Chair)
- Anika Wells MP
- Senator Patrick Dodson
- Senator Rachel Siewert
- Senator Matthew Canavan
- George Christensen MP
- Senator Dean Smith
- Phillip Thompson MP
- Warren Snowdon MP

=== Submissions ===
There were 160 submissions received by the committee between June and November 2020. Tanya Butler, who was WA registrar of Aboriginal heritage sites and secretariat of the Aboriginal Cultural Materials Committee (ACMC), was questioned by Warren Entsch during the inquiry. The ACMC is responsible under the Aboriginal Heritage Act 1972 for assessing applications to disturb Aboriginal heritage sites under Section 18 of the Act, but the definition of an Aboriginal site had been changed over the years. Butler said that the ACMC had not been aware of the full significance of the Juukan Gorge sites when it was assessed in 2013.

Submission 152 showed that Rio Tinto had received ministerial consent to damage the site in 2013 under Section 18 in the pursuit of expanding their iron ore mining operations. The PKKP had not objected to Section 18, despite having taken part to the excavation works in 2009.

=== Interim report (December 2020) ===
On 9 December 2020, the inquiry published its interim report, entitled Never Again. The report "highlights the disparity in power between Indigenous peoples and industry in the protection of Indigenous heritage, and the serious failings of legislation designed to protect Indigenous heritage and promote Native Title". Seven recommendations were made, including a moratorium on mining in the area and rehabilitation of the site. The report also recommended that compensation should be paid to the traditional owners. It said that the destruction of the caves was "inexcusable", and also called upon mining companies to voluntarily stop acting on existing approvals. While the inquiry and report was bipartisan, there was one dissenting voice with regard to the moratorium; Western Australian Liberal senator Dean Smith was concerned that essential work on infrastructure would be unnecessarily delayed.

The report also recommends that the Western Australian Government review and reform the current state heritage laws, and that the federal government review the Aboriginal and Torres Strait Islander Heritage Protection Act 1984. It also outlines deficiencies in the WA Act.

After the publication of the report, Senator Pat Dodson tweeted "The destruction of these ancient sites was a disaster for our nation and the world".

The inquiry investigated the failings of state and Commonwealth heritage protection laws, as Rio Tinto's action was technically legal, after they had obtained permission in 2013, under Section 18 of WA's Aboriginal Heritage Act 1972 to go ahead with their blasting operations. The process included discussions with Aboriginal people, industry experts, and the larger community. The full report (called A Way Forward) was published on 18 October 2021.

== New legislation ==
In 2021, the Aboriginal Cultural Heritage Act 2021 was passed, superseding the Aboriginal Heritage Act 1972 from 1 July 2023. The new act puts traditional owners at the centre of the decision-making process about heritage management. In this act, Local Aboriginal Cultural Heritage Services, native title and other Aboriginal corporations will play a critical role in managing and surveying heritage locations. On 8 August 2023, the premier of Western Australia announced that the act would be repealed and the 1972 act reinstated and amended.

The amended 1972 law came into effect in Western Australia on 15 November 2023. One change is the new statutory Aboriginal Cultural Heritage Committee, with majority Aboriginal membership. It will make recommendations to government on "Section 18" decisions regarding Aboriginal sites. The first test of the law came in February 2024 with an incident violating the new law, regarding waterways in Shire of Toodyay.

== Replica construction ==
After the blasting incident in 2020, only a portion of the western wall of the rock shelter now remains. "To restore Indigenous Australians' sense of belonging to the area", plans are underway to construct a realistic full-size replica of the destroyed shelters on-country, in a manner similar to the replicas of the famous Lascaux and Chauvet caves in France. Without recent detailed photogrammetry, historic photos, oral history, and imprints of the original rockface are being used to replicate the walls of the shelter as concrete blocks in Perth, to be re-assembled at the Pilbara site. Unlike the French reconstructions which used a steel frame sprayed with mortar, the Juukan reconstruction will not be made from steel, to avoid corrosion and to ensure its longevity over hundreds of years. The reconstruction is being funded by Rio Tinto. It is unlikely, however, to become a tourist attraction like the French caves, but rather a place for young people to learn about their cultural heritage.
