= Aboriginal Cultural Heritage Act 2003 =

Queensland Parliament act

Legislative Assembly of Queensland
- Long title: Aboriginal Cultural Heritage Act 2003 (Qld)
- Enacted by: Legislative Assembly of Queensland
- Enacted: 6 November 2003
- Introduced by: Hon. Stephen Robertson

The Aboriginal Cultural Heritage Act 2003 is legislation passed by Queensland Parliament, commencing in April 2004 to recognise, protect and conserve Aboriginal cultural heritage in the State of Queensland

A key feature of the Act is its creation of a new legal responsibility or statutory "duty of care" requiring all people across the State to respect, value and protect the State's Aboriginal cultural heritage, at risk of prosecution and substantial fines should they fail to take all reasonable and practical measures to ensure their activities do no damage

== Background and history ==
The excavation of the Broadbeach Aboriginal burial ground in 1965, and the repatriation and reburial of the remains in 1988 played a significant role in the development of this Act, which was the state's first cultural heritage legislation, which culminated in this piece of legislation.

The Aboriginal Relics Preservation Act 1967 was the first piece of legislation to protect Aboriginal archaeological sites. This was replaced by the Cultural Record (Landscapes Queensland and Queensland Estate) Act 1987, which was in turn replaced by the 2003 Act.

== Overview ==
In proclaiming this statute, Queensland Parliament:

- created a statutory duty of care applying to all land users in Queensland, regardless of tenure;
- recognized any pre-existing agreements landholders may have entered into with Aboriginal owners;
- established a register of Aboriginal cultural heritage to be protected, plus database holding information and details of known Aboriginal cultural heritage places
- proscribed fundamental principles requiring areas and objects of significance to Aboriginal people to be protected and managed in accordance with relevant Aboriginal laws, customs or history
- provided for Aboriginal peoples to play an active role protecting Aboriginal cultural heritage by enabling particularly interested groups to form State approved Aboriginal cultural heritage bodies to whom cultural heritage inquires are referred
- provided for land users and Aboriginal peoples to be able to negotiate, agree, enter into, and, if desired, register with the State, cultural heritage management plans proscribing how Aboriginal cultural heritage is to be managed in particular places
- removed an earlier requirement under former Aboriginal cultural heritage legislation that a permit first be obtained before cultural heritage studies or management plans could be undertaken.

== Definition of Cultural Heritage ==
The Act defines Aboriginal cultural heritage as being:

- any significant Aboriginal area within Queensland;
- any significant Aboriginal object from Queensland; or
- any place within Queensland containing in situ evidence of archaeological or historic significance to Aboriginal peoples prior occupation of the State

A Minister who was responsible for implementing the Aboriginal Cultural Heritage Act 2003 (i.e. then Queensland Natural Resources and Water Minister Craig Wallace) gave example of the kinds of things he believes to be Aboriginal cultural heritage as follows:

"Cultural Heritage relates to significant Aboriginal .. objects and places, or archaeological or historic evidence of indigenous occupation of an area ...These can be rock shelters, carved or scarred trees, engravings, paintings, shell middens, fish traps, grinding grooves, earth and stone arrangements and other artifacts."

== Statutory "Duty of Care" ==
In proclaiming the Aboriginal Cultural Heritage Act 2003, Queensland Parliament intended to provide "blanket" statutory protection to ALL of Queensland's Aboriginal cultural heritage, irrespective of whether or not that heritage is known toland users.

To achieve this end, Parliament created a formal, statutory "duty of care", by which anyone carrying out any activity on any land (including freehold) anywhere in Queensland is required by law to take:

"..all reasonable and practicable measures to ensure their activity does not harm Aboriginal cultural heritage".

The risk both individuals and corporations take should they fail to take care, and so damage Aboriginal cultural heritage (even secret or sacred heritage embedded into the landscape unknown to the land user), is legal prosecution (coordinated by Queensland Government's cultural heritage unit), and possible fines of up to A$75,000 for individuals, or A$750,000 for corporations.

== Coverage ==
After 4½ years of heritage protection under the Aboriginal Cultural Heritage Act 2003, the Minister responsible for the Aboriginal Cultural Heritage Act 1993 announced:

- the cultural heritage databases holds approximately 23 000 records of known indigenous cultural heritage places
- the State had approved 22 indigenous cultural heritage bodies to assist protect cultural heritage (to whom cultural heritage inquiries are referred)
- for each of 2007–2008 & 2008–2009 the State has made a total of $100 000 per annum in grants available to assist pay some of the costs of studies updating the cultural heritage database, plus some of the operating costs of the approved Aboriginal cultural heritage bodies.

== See also ==
- Ban Ban Springs - First place put on Queensland's Aboriginal Cultural Heritage Register
- Ngarrabullgan - Second place to be put on to Queensland's Aboriginal Cultural Heritage register
- Torres Strait Islander Cultural Heritage Act 2003
