= Tom Albanese =

American businessman

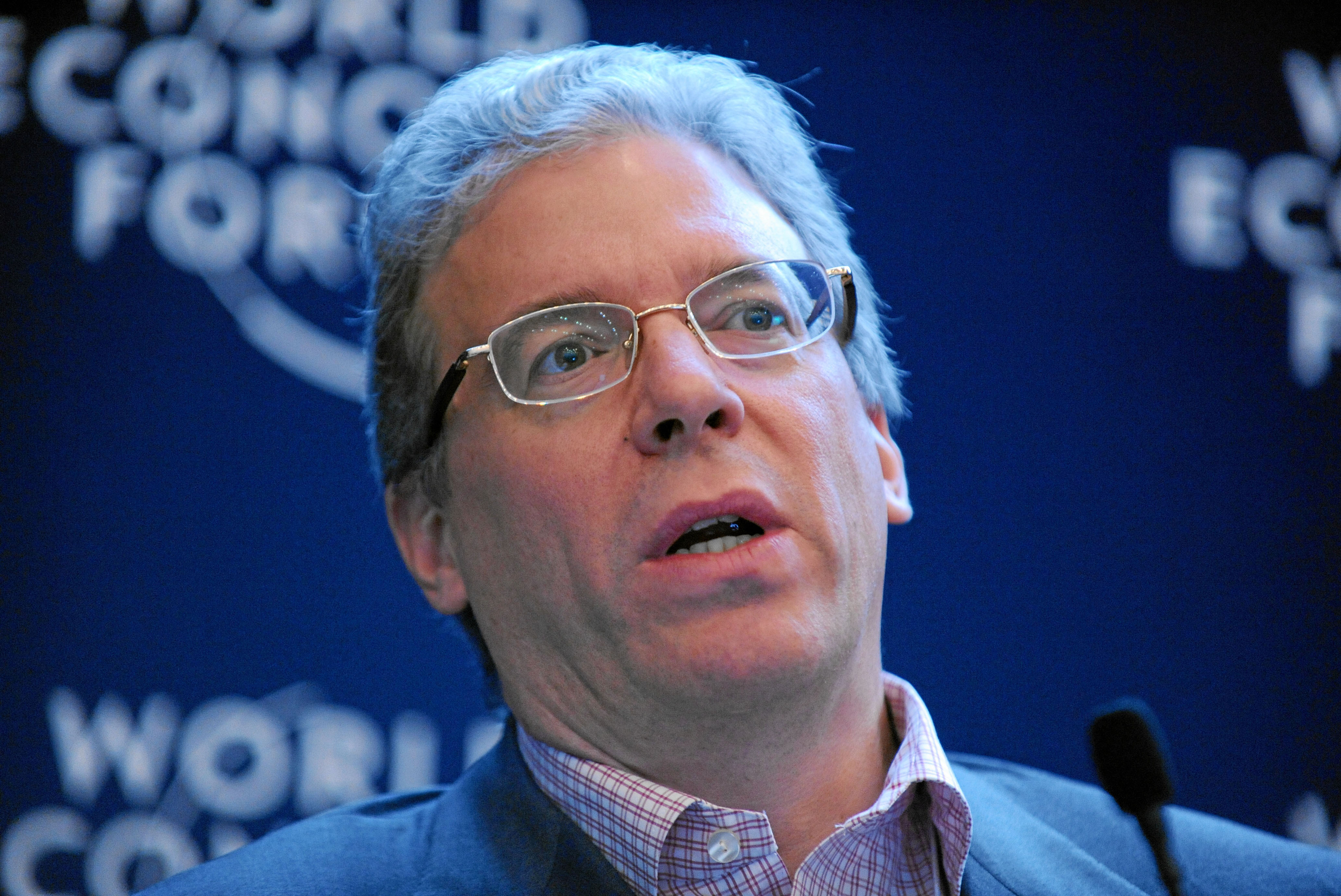
- Albanese at the 2012 World Economic Forum annual meeting
- Born: September 9, 1957 (age 69); United States
- Education: University of Alaska Fairbanks
- Occupation: Businessman
- Children: 2

Tom Albanese (born September 9, 1957) is the former chief executive officer of the Vedanta Resources and the former chief executive officer and a board member of the Rio Tinto Group. He was asked to resign from Rio Tinto on January 17, 2013 and was replaced by Sam Walsh. Albanese to stepped down as Vedanta CEO in August 2017.

== Biography ==
Albanese was born in New Jersey and earned both a bachelor's degree in mineral economics and a master's in mining engineering from the University of Alaska Fairbanks. After college he worked in Alaska on a gold mining project in 1981, which mining company NERCO purchased.

=== Family ===
He is married and has two children.

=== Career ===
The Portland, Oregon based NERCO was a subsidiary of PacifiCorp, which was acquired by Rio Tinto Group in 1993 through a subsidiary. Albanese moved to London to take the position of Rio Tinto's chief of exploration in 1995, and then in 1998 became the president of the subsidiary that had purchased NERCO. He received another promotion in 2006 to the position of director of group resources. According to Forbes magazine, Albanese's total 2007 compensation was valued at $12,596,000. He has previously held several managerial positions within Rio Tinto's organization, including at North Limited and Kennecott Utah Copper. He has also served on the boards of Ivanhoe Mines (2006–07) and Palabora Mining Company (2004–06). In March 2014, he became the CEO of London-based mining company Vedanta Resources.
