= Sam Walsh (businessman) =

Australian businessman (born 1949)

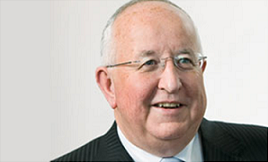
- Born: Sam Maurice Cossart Walsh; 27 December 1949 (age 76); Middle Brighton, Victoria, Australia
- Education: Brighton Grammar School
- Alma mater: Taylor's College, Melbourne University; Kettering University
- Occupations: Former CEO, Rio Tinto Group
- Spouse(s): Leanne Walsh, née Roki
- Parent(s): Maurice John Walsh; Winifred Margaret Lois Cossart

Sam Walsh AO (born 27 December 1949) is an Australian businessman who has been a non-executive director of Mitsui & Co since June 2017. He was chief executive officer (CEO) of London-based mining company Rio Tinto Group, from 2013 to 2016.

Prior to becoming CEO of Rio Tinto, Walsh was Rio Tinto chief of the Iron Ore group, and of Rio Tinto Australia. Based in the Australian city of Perth, he oversaw company's mining operations and expansions in Pilbara, Western Australia.

== Early life ==
Sam Walsh was born in 1949 and grew up in the Melbourne seaside suburb of Brighton. His father died when he was 15.

Walsh attended Brighton Grammar School and Taylor's College in Melbourne. He graduated with a Bachelor of Commerce from Melbourne University, and completed a Fellowship Program at Kettering University in Michigan. He became a Fellow of the Australian Institute of Management, Australasian Institute of Mining and Metallurgy, Chartered Institute of Purchasing and Supply Management, Australian Institute of Company Directors, The Institute of Directors (UK), and Australian Academy of Technical Sciences and Engineering.

After graduating from Melbourne University, Walsh began his career as a trainee buyer at General Motors. During the next 20 years in the automotive industry, he was promoted to and held senior positions at General Motors and at Nissan Australia.

== Mining ==
Walsh joined Rio Tinto in 1991. He subsequently held a number of management positions within Rio Tinto, including chief executive of the Aluminium group 2001-2004, and chief executive of the Iron Ore group 2004-2013. His responsibilities covered operations and projects in Australia, Brazil, Canada, Guinea and India, as well as Dampier Salt and Rio Tinto Marine. During 2004-2009, he oversaw the rapid expansion of the Iron Ore group. More than US$20 billion was spent on mine expansions and major infrastructure developments with net earnings exceeding US$9 billion.

Meanwhile, in 2005 Walsh was appointed a director of the Western Australian Chamber of Commerce and Industry, and he was appointed a director of Seven West Media in 2008. The following year he was appointed a director of Rio Tinto. In 2010, Walsh was appointed an Officer in the General Division of the Order of Australia.

On 17 January 2013, Walsh was appointed CEO of Rio Tinto Group, London. In his first year at the helm, Walsh took the company from a US$3 billion loss to a US$3.7 billion profit. According to the company annual report in March 2014, Walsh was paid US$9.1 million in 2013, up 44% from the $6.3 million he earned in 2012. The figure included salary, a cash bonus, shares and other benefits. His predecessor Tom Albanese was paid 4 million pounds ($6.7 million) in 2012.

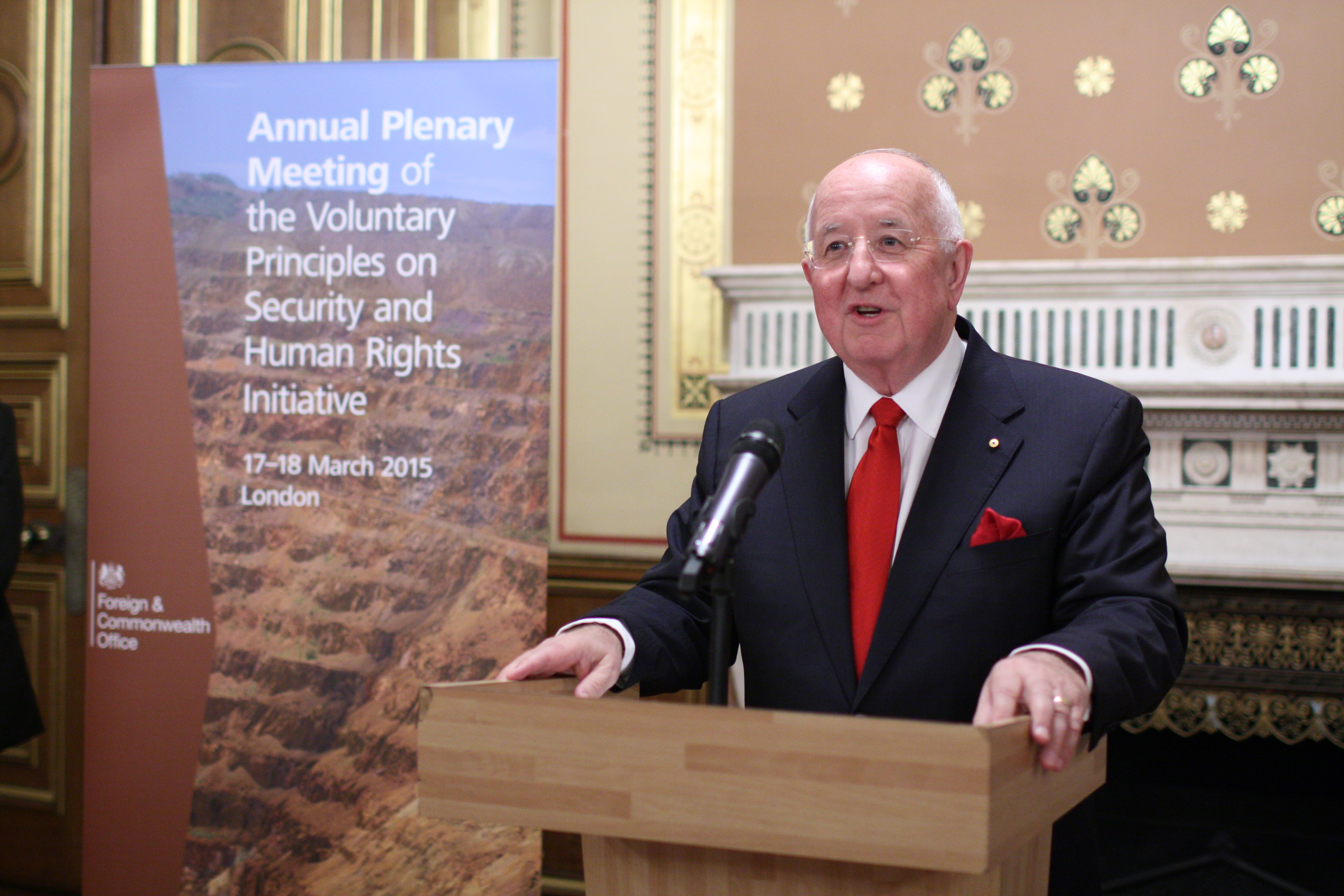
Walsh speaks at the Annual Plenary Meeting of the Voluntary Principles on Security and Human Rights Initiative on March 17, 2015 in London.

On 27 March 2014, Walsh was awarded the Honorary Degree of Doctor of Commerce at the graduation ceremony of The University of Western Australia.

Rio Tinto Chairman Jan du Plessis confirmed on 23 October 2014, the company had retained Walsh for the longer term and Walsh would continue as CEO of Rio Tinto beyond the end of 2015. Originally, he was given a three-year contract. However, in March 2016 Walsh announced he was retiring on 1 July 2016. Du Plessis said Jean-Sebastien Jacques, whom Walsh appointed to head Rio Tinto copper and coal, would be the new CEO. It was reported that Walsh would receive $1.4 million to cover the remaining nine months of his contract.

=== Controversy ===
Based on Rio Tinto submission to the Senate Enquiry, Sam Walsh was the CEO of Rio Tinto when the controversial decision of presenting only one mining plan to the PKKP people was made. This led to the destruction of Juukan 1 & 2 sacred sites in May 2020. 3 other mining plans were considered. They didn't involve disturbing the sites. The choice of the mining plan was driven by access to less than 10 Million Tonnes of high grade iron ore for an incremental value of $138m. During Walsh's term as CEO the Juukan Gorge was not disturbed following his verbal instruction not to mine the Gorge.

Business positions
Preceded by Tom Albanese	CEO, Rio Tinto Group; 2013–2016	Succeeded by Jean-Sebastien Jacques
