= Stern Hu =

Chinese-Australian businessman (born 1963)

- Born: Hu Shitai; 1963 (age 62–63); Tianjin, China
- Other name: Hu Shitai (胡士泰)
- Education: Peking University
- Employer: formerly Rio Tinto
- Known for: Australian iron ore enterprise businessman jailed for stealing commercial secrets and receiving bribes
- Title: Chief Representative in Shanghai, Hamersley Iron Chinese Regional Manager
- Spouse: Julie Hu

Stern Hu (Chinese: 胡士泰; pinyin: Hú Shìtài; born 1963 in Tianjin) is an Australian businessman jailed in China after pleading guilty to stealing commercial secrets and receiving bribes. Hu was formerly an executive of Rio Tinto mining group in Shanghai, having graduated from Peking University before obtaining Australian citizenship in 1994. He was released in July 2018 after serving eight years of a ten-year prison sentence.

== Conviction in China ==
On 5 July 2009, Hu and three Chinese colleagues were detained by the Chinese government. On 29 March 2010, Hu was sentenced to ten years' jail after pleading guilty to stealing commercial secrets and receiving bribes.

According to China state media, data found stored on Hu's personal laptop allegedly contained confidential business information of several dozen major business partners of Rio Tinto, including storage levels and sales plans deemed much too specific and precise to have been acquired legitimately. Hu was accused of having obtained such information through bribery and other illegal means for massive corporate and personal benefits.

Australian Prime Minister Kevin Rudd, a former diplomat to China, refused to intervene on a personal level, and criticised the media and the opposition party for adding political bias to the issue. Australian authorities were granted access to Stern Hu, and Foreign Minister Stephen Smith subsequently declared that he was in good health. After the trial, Rio Tinto terminated the employment of Hu and other convicted executives. According to Rio Tinto's chief executive, the trial would not adversely affect any business connections.

== See also ==
- Rio Tinto espionage case
- Xue Feng
- List of Australians imprisoned or executed abroad
