= Jean-Sébastien Jacques =

CEO of Rio Tinto

- Born: Jean-Sébastien Dominique Francois Jacques; October 1971 (age 54); France
- Other names: JS
- Citizenship: British
- Education: Lycée Louis-le-Grand; École Centrale Paris
- Occupation: Businessman
- Known for: CEO of Rio Tinto
- Spouse: Muriel Demarcus
- Children: 2

Jean-Sébastien Dominique Francois Jacques (born October 1971) is a former chief executive officer of Rio Tinto Group. He succeeded Sam Walsh in July 2016. He was succeeded by Jakob Stausholm in early 2021.

Jacques had been named by the Harvard Business Review as one of the world's best chief executives in 2019.

== Early life ==
Jacques was born in France in October 1971. He attended the Lycée Louis-le-Grand in Paris before studying engineering at École Centrale Paris.

== Career ==
Prior to Rio Tinto, Jacques was group strategy director for Tata Steel.

Jacques joined Rio Tinto in 2011, and became head of copper and coal businesses. Jacques became deputy CEO in March 2016, and CEO in July 2016.

During his tenure, Jacques set an ambition for Rio Tinto Group to become net carbon neutral by 2050 underpinned by a commitment to invest around $1 billion between 2020 and 2025. He entered into a series of partnerships with several customers and partners to address climate change and environmental challenges: with Apple and Alcoa to develop new aluminium technologies (2018), with China Baowu Steel Group, the largest steel maker in China and Tsinghua University(2019)., and with Nippon steel, the largest steel maker in Japan (2020). He exited all Rio Tinto Group coal assets between 2016 and 2018, ahead of the industry.

In May 2020, Rio Tinto legally demolished an Indigenous site, the Juukan Gorge, with explosives, igniting international outrage amid the height of the Black Lives Matter movement and the lead-up to Australia's failed Indigenous Voice referendum. In front of the commission of enquiry Jacques said that in 2013 the group had three other options to develop its mine without damaging the ancient site. "The difference between the fourth option and the other three options was eight million tonnes of high-grade iron ore" (82 million euros). The fourth option was chosen to blast the cave and a section 18 (authorisation to disturb the site) was granted in 2013 under the previous CEO, Sam Walsh.

Upon Jacques' resignation in September 2020, Rio Tinto's chairman Simon Thompson stated that “What happened at Juukan was wrong and we are determined to ensure that the destruction of a heritage site of such exceptional archaeological and cultural significance never occurs again at a Rio Tinto operation. . . . I would like to thank J-S for his strong leadership of the Group since becoming Chief Executive in 2016. During that time, he has led the best safety performance in Rio Tinto’s history, simplified the portfolio, divested the Group’s coal assets, established a clear strategy to address climate change and generated exceptional shareholder returns. His leadership during the COVID-19 pandemic, in particular, has been exemplary".

Jacques was the chairman of the International Copper Association from 2014 to 2016. He is a board member of the International Council on Mining and Metals (ICMM) since 2016.

He is a member of the Global CEO Council (GCC) of the Chinese People's Association for Friendship with Foreign Countries, and a member of the Business Council in the USA. He was a board member of the Business Council of Australia from November 2019 until his resignation in September 2020.

In 2019 Jacques was named by Harvard Business Review as one of the world's 100 best chief executives.

== Personal life ==
He is married to Muriel Demarcus and has two daughters.
