= Rio Tinto espionage case =

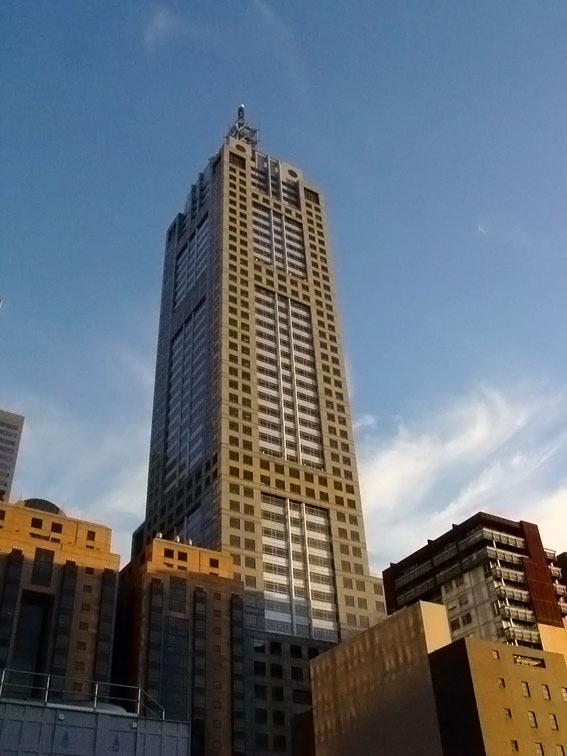
Rio Tinto's Australian headquarters, 120 Collins Street building, Melbourne, Australia.

The Rio Tinto espionage case began with the arrest on 5 July 2009, of four staff in the Shanghai office of the Rio Tinto, in the People's Republic of China, who were subsequently accused of bribery and espionage. Two days later, an import executive of the Shougang Group and Laigang Group was also arrested. The Rio Tinto employees, Australian Stern Hu and three Chinese colleagues, Wang Yong, Ge Minqiang, and Liu Caikui, went on trial in Shanghai on Monday, 22 March 2010.

The government dropped the charges relating to the alleged theft of trade secrets before the trial, and the defendants admitted to having received bribes during the trial.

Following the trial, Stern Hu was sentenced to 10 years jail. Hu and other convicted executives have also had their employment terminated by Rio Tinto Ltd. It is reported that the motive behind the terminations is in regards to a breach of conduct, with Rio Tinto accepting the evidence provided showing instances of bribery. Rio Tinto stated that the trial will not affect business ties, according to its chief executive.

== Background ==
The arrests came during difficult negotiations over the price of iron ore for the 2009-2010 period. After steep increases in 2008, Chinese steelmakers hoped to see iron prices come down again because of the global recession. The Rio Tinto employees are accused of having industry data crucial to the negotiations too detailed to have been obtained legally. On Thursday, July 16 Reuters reported that Rio Tinto had evacuated its iron ore and steel industry research staff from Shanghai the day before, as had "other foreign groups... until conditions there become more certain."

The arrests also came shortly after Rio Tinto declined to sell part of the company to the Chinese state-owned company Chinalco. Chinalco currently owns 9.3% of Rio Tinto; the additional investment would have raised Chinalco's ownership stake in Rio Tinto to 18.5%. The proposed deal met strong political opposition in Australia, and Rio Tinto decided instead to raise the money through existing shareholders and by forming a joint venture with BHP Billiton.

Rio Tinto negotiated on behalf of Vale, BHP Billiton and itself as a consortium with the Chinese side being represented by CISA. Traditionally the role of the Chinese side was filled by Baosteel.

== Chinese State Secrets Bureau accusations ==
Accusations posted on a website controlled by the Chinese State Secrets Bureau, alleging that large amounts of "intelligence and data" have been found on computers of the arrested Rio Tinto employees. A report on publishing website affiliate of China's national secrets watchdog accused Rio Tinto of "winning over and buying off, prying out intelligence... and gaining things by deceit", during critical annual iron ore pricing negotiations.

Rio Tinto was accused of causing US$100 billion worth of damages to the Chinese economy over a 6-year period, by Jiang Ruqin, a Chinese employee with the Jiangsu Province Administration for the Protection of State Secrets. However, Bloomberg data showed that Rio Tinto's global iron ore revenue in the 5 years from 2004 to 2008 were US$41 billion. Jiang consequently admitted to using fabricated data from China Central Television and the China Youth Daily newspaper for his accusation.

== Aftermath ==
Chongqing Evening News (重庆晚报) claims that fallout from the espionage scandal, on July 5, has caused Rio Tinto damages to its reputation worth up to 100 billion yuan in share price (US$14.6 billion, 17.4 billion AUD) after dropping from highs of 77 AUD on the Australian Securities Exchange. Share market data shows that Rio Tinto stock actually started to decline on 12 June, 23 days before the espionage case scandal was reported on, reaching the bottom on July 13 at 46.63 AUD before steadily rising to a price of 59.99 AUD as of August 15.

Rio Tinto paid US$5 million to Henry Kissinger, to advise the company how to distance itself from Hu.

In August 2009, BHP Billiton called for iron ore to be traded on an open market like other commodities. BHP CFO Alex Vanselow stated that selling iron ore on the open market like copper would mean that deals would be handled in a more transparent manner and that cases like the Stern Hu case would not be possible. Another benefit would be that investors would have a better idea of price trends.

== See also ==
- Stern Hu
