= Jakob Stausholm =

Danish businessman (born 1968)

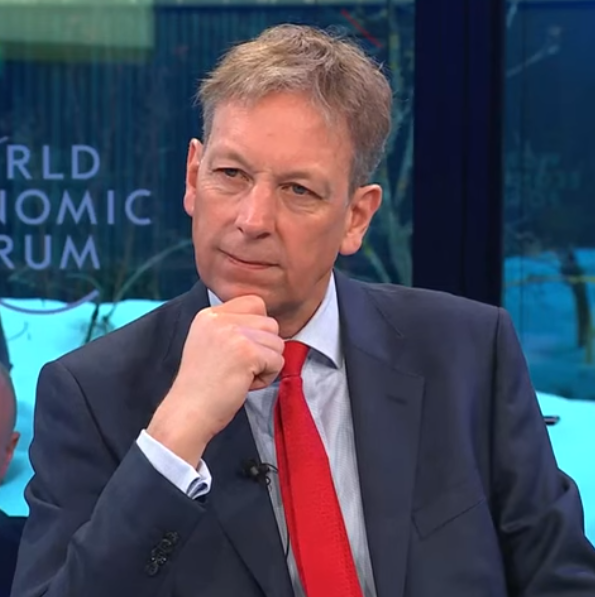
- At the WEF Annual Meeting in 2025
- Born: 16 August 1968 (age 57)
- Education: University of Copenhagen
- Occupation: Businessman

Jakob Stausholm (born 16 August 1968) is a Danish businessman and was the chief executive of Rio Tinto Group from January 2021 until August 2025. He is now a fellow at the University of Oxford.

== Career ==
Stausholm attended Nyborg Gymnasium in Funen, Denmark. He earned a degree in economics from the University of Copenhagen.

Stausholm joined Rio Tinto in September 2018 as an executive director and chief financial officer. He succeeded Jean-Sébastien Jacques as CEO on 1 January 2021.

Before Rio Tinto, Stausholm was the chief strategy, finance and transformation officer for Maersk. Prior to this, Stausholm worked for Shell for 19 years.

In May 2025, it was announced by Rio Tinto that Stausholm would be stepping down as chief executive in 2025 once the company had selected his replacement.
