= NERCO =

American mining company

NERCO was an American mining company headquartered in Portland, Oregon, with interests in coal, natural gas, and oil. The company also had significant operations in gold and silver mining, and manufacture of gallium arsenide wafers.

NERCO was created in 1977 by Pacific Power & Light Company due to a change in United States federal law requiring the development of federal coal leases. From its origins in coal, the company expanded into other mining ventures, including an unsuccessful foray into uranium mining. In August 1984, the company went public, selling 10% of its shares and trading on the New York Stock Exchange. By 1992, the company had grown to $920 million in annual revenues and employed 2,200. NERCO was included in the Fortune 500 list of major American companies from 1985 to 1993, peaking at number 353 in 1992.

In 1993, NERCO was acquired for $470 million (plus assumption of debt) by the Kennecott Corporation, a Utah-based subsidiary of the Rio Tinto Group. PacifiCorp owned 82% of NERCO stock at the time. Rio Tinto sold off NERCO's oil and gas operations later that year for $510 million.

Tom Albanese, the former chief executive officer of the Rio Tinto Group, joined that company when it acquired NERCO, which was his previous employer.
