= Rio Tinto (corporation) =

Anglo-Australian multinational mining company

Rio Tinto Group Rio Tinto plc & Rio Tinto Limited

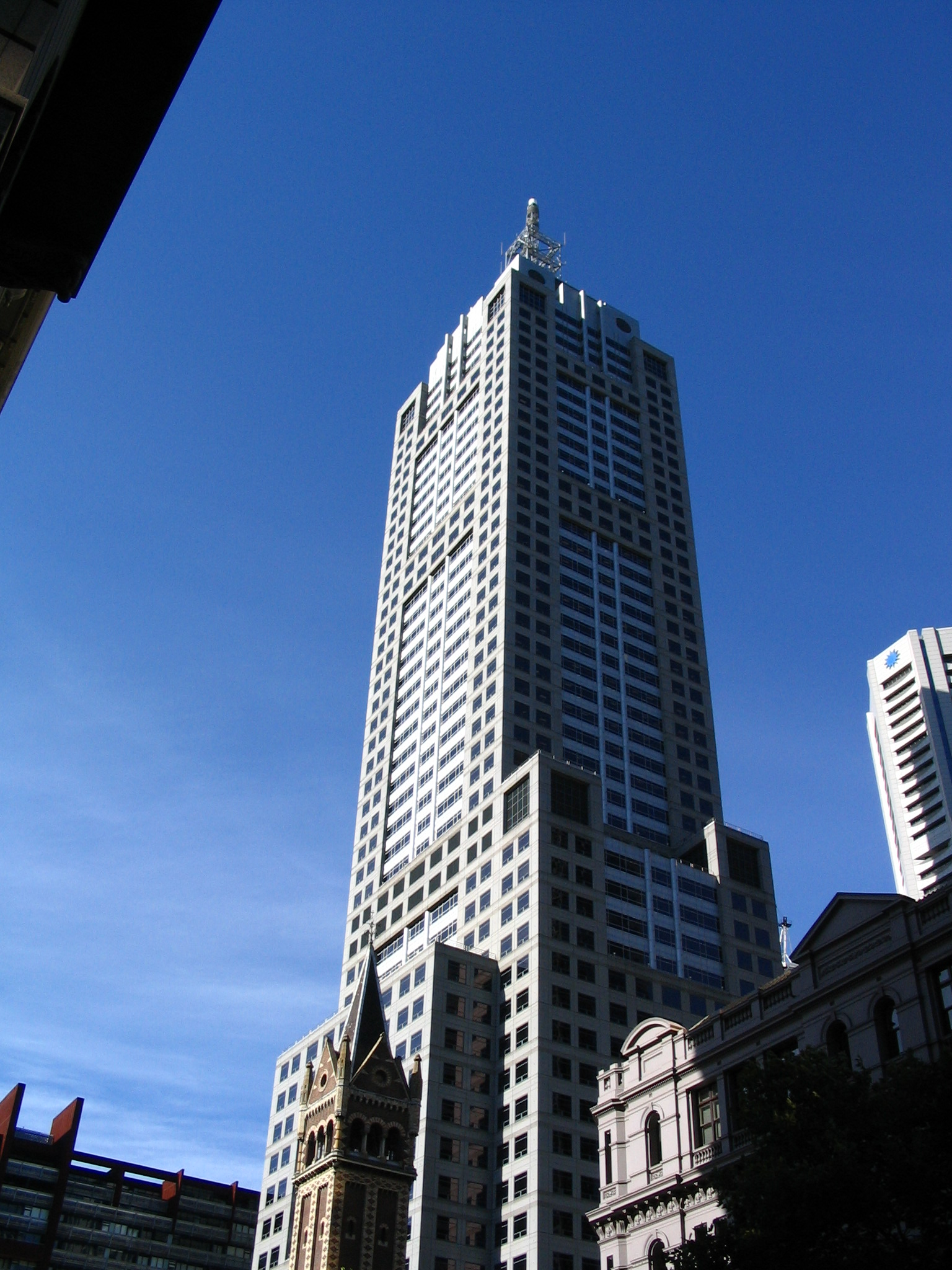
- Rio Tinto headquarters in Melbourne, Australia
- Type: Dual-listed company
- Traded as: ASX: RIO; LSE: RIO; NYSE: RIO; FTSE 100 Index component S&P/ASX 200 component
- Industry: Metals and mining
- Founded: 29 March 1873; 153 years ago
- Headquarters: London, England; Melbourne, Australia
- Area served: Worldwide
- Key people: Dominic Barton (chairman); Simon Trott (chief executive)
- Products: Iron ore, bauxite, alumina, aluminium, copper, molybdenum, gold, diamonds, titanium dioxide, borates, salt, talc
- Revenue: ▲US$57.638 billion (2025)
- Operating income: ▼US$14.936 billion (2025)
- Net income: ▼US$10.249 billion (2025)
- Total assets: ▲US$128.102 billion (2025)
- Total equity: ▲US$67.024 billion (2025)
- Number of employees: 60,000 (2026)
- Website: www.riotinto.com

Rio Tinto Group is a British–Australian multinational mining company headquartered in London, England, and Melbourne, Australia. It was founded in 1873 when a group of British investors purchased a mine complex on the Río Tinto, in Huelva, Spain, from the Spanish government. It has grown through a long series of mergers and acquisitions and is today a major producer of commodities such as copper, iron ore, aluminium and lithium.

Rio Tinto is a dual-listed company, traded on both the London Stock Exchange, where it is a component of the FTSE 100 Index, and the Australian Securities Exchange, where it is a component of the S&P/ASX 200 index. American depositary shares of Rio Tinto's British branch are also traded on the New York Stock Exchange, giving it listings on three major stock exchanges. In the 2020 Forbes Global 2000, it was ranked the world's 114th-largest public company. It was ranked the world's 274th largest company in the 2025 Fortune Global 500.

Rio Tinto has faced criticism by environmental groups as well as the government of Norway for the environmental impacts of its mining activities.

== History ==
=== Formation ===
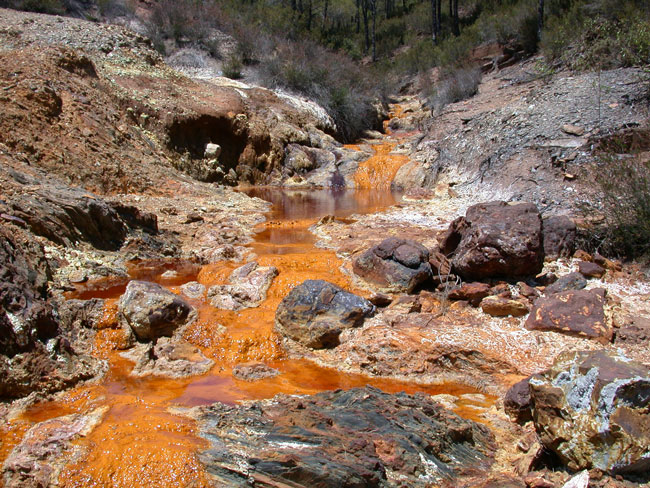
The company's name comes from the Río Tinto in south-western Spain.

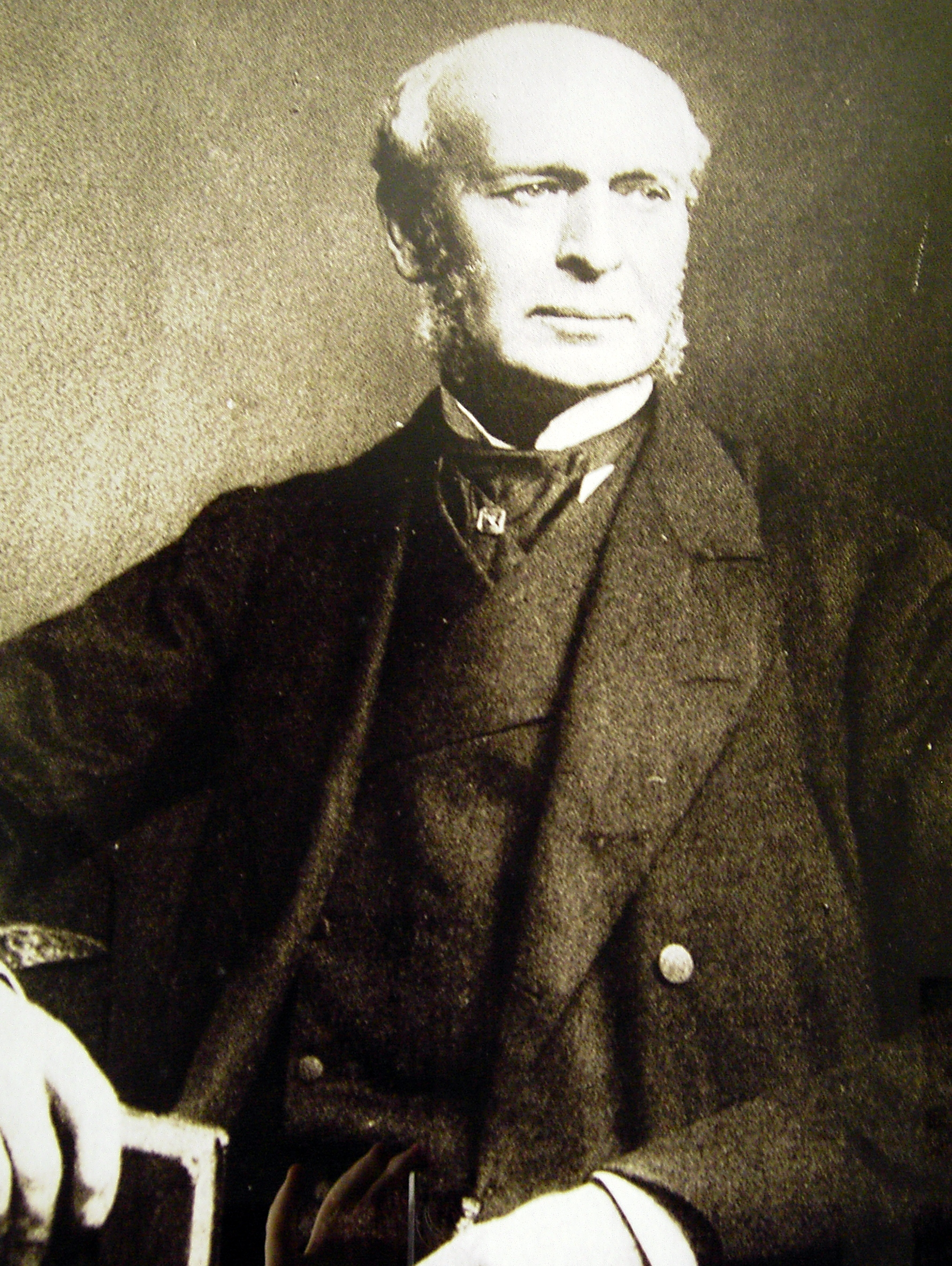
Hugh Matheson led the purchase of the Rio Tinto mines from Spain, and was the company's first president.

Since antiquity, a site along the Río Tinto in Huelva, Spain, has been mined for copper, silver, gold and other minerals. Around 3000 BC, Iberians and Tartessians began mining the site, followed by the Phoenicians, Greeks, Romans, Visigoths and Moors. After a period of abandonment, the mines were rediscovered in 1556 and the Spanish government began operating them once again in 1724.

However, Spain's mining operations there were inefficient, and the government itself was otherwise distracted by political and financial crises, leading the government to sell the mines in 1873 at a price later determined to be well below actual value. The purchasers of the mine were led by Hugh Matheson's Matheson & Company, which ultimately formed a syndicate consisting of Deutsche Bank (56% ownership), Matheson (24%) and the civil engineering firm Clark, Punchard and Company (20%). At an auction held by the Spanish government to sell the mine on 14 February 1873, the group won with a bid of £3.68 million (ESP 92.8 million, equivalent to ~£519.3 million as of September 2026). The bid also specified that Spain would permanently relinquish any right to claim royalties on the mine's production. Following purchase of the mine, the syndicate launched the Rio Tinto Company, registering it on 29 March 1873. At the end of the 1880s, control of the firm passed to the Rothschild family, who increased the scale of its mining operations.

=== 20th century expansion and development ===
Following their purchase of the Río Tinto Mine, the new ownership constructed a number of new processing facilities, innovated new mining techniques, and expanded mining activities.

During the first years of the company's operation in Spain, the company practiced open-air pyrite calcination in blast furnaces. The toxic fumes released by this process had a negative impact on the farmland and the local agriculturists, which led to the company's workers and some local anarchists coming together to protest against this practice. On 4 February 1888, several thousand rank and file—agriculturalists, anarchists and mineworkers—marched to the Río Tinto town hall (ayuntamiento) to deliver their petitions to the mayor. The civil guards, under perceived threat of mob violence, fired on the crowd, killing at least 13 and injuring 35.

From 1877 to 1891, the Río Tinto Mine was the world's leading producer of copper.

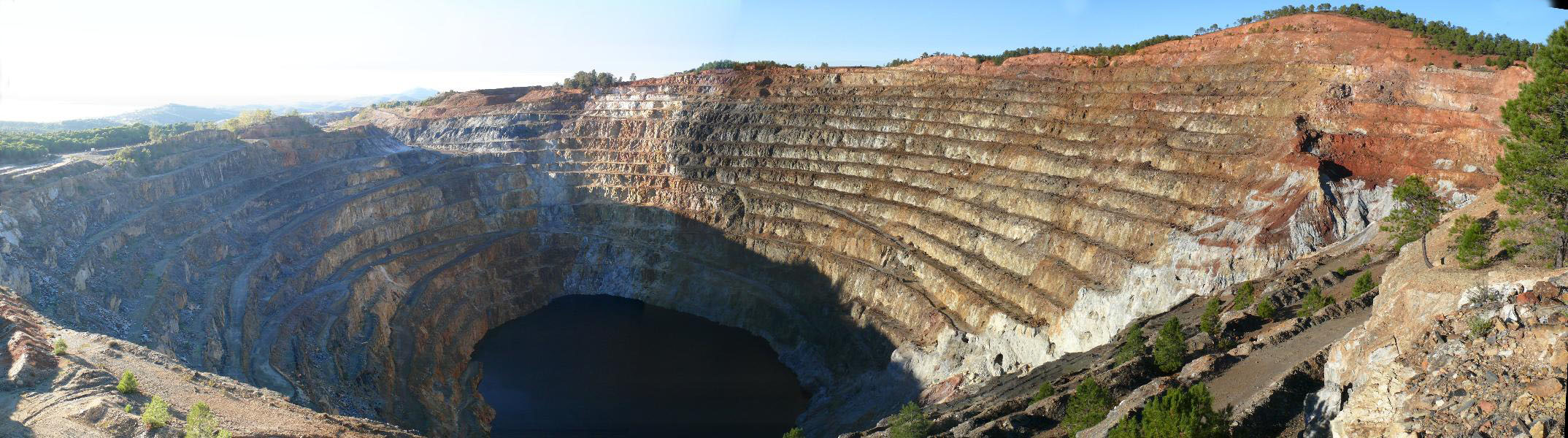
The open-pit Corta Atalaya mine was part of Rio Tinto's original operations in Spain.

From 1870 through 1925, the company was inwardly focused on fully exploiting the Río Tinto Mine, with little attention paid to expansion or exploration activities outside of Spain. The company enjoyed strong financial success until 1914, colluding with other pyrite producers to control market prices. However, World War I and its aftermath effectively eliminated the United States as a viable market for European pyrites, leading to a decline in the firm's prominence.

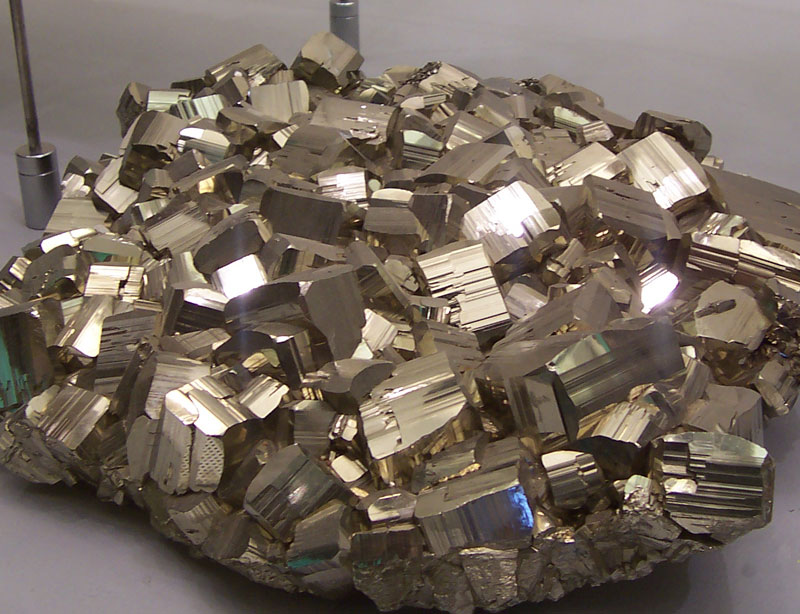
Pyrite was a major product of Rio Tinto's first mines.

The company's failure to diversify during this period led to the slow decline of the company among the ranks of international mining firms. However, this changed in 1925, when Sir Auckland Geddes succeeded Lord Alfred Milner as chairman. Geddes and the new management team he installed focused on diversification of the company's investment strategy and the introduction of organisational and marketing reforms. Geddes led the company into a series of joint ventures with customers in the development of new technologies, as well as exploration and development of new mines outside of Spain. Between 1925 and 1931, Geddes recruited two directors: JN Buchanan (finance director) and RM Preston (commercial director), as well as other executives involved with technical and other matters.

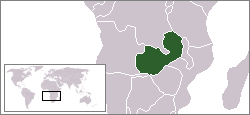
Northern Rhodesia was the location of Rio Tinto's first major international expansion of mining activities.

The company's first major acquisition occurred in 1929, when the company issued stock for the purpose of raising 2.5 million pounds to invest in Northern Rhodesian copper mining companies, which was fully invested by the end of 1930. The Rio Tinto company consolidated its holdings of these various firms under the Rhokana Corporation by forcing the various companies to merge.

Rio Tinto's status as a mainly British-owned company, located in Spain and producing pyrites—an important material for military applications—created a complicated set of circumstances for the company's operation in the 1930s and 1940s. During the Spanish Civil War, the region in which Rio Tinto's mines were located came under the control of General Franco's Nationalists in 1936. However, Franco increasingly intervened in the company's operations, at times requisitioning pyrite supplies for use by Spain and its Axis allies Germany and Italy, forcing price controls on the company's production, restricting exports, and threatening nationalisation of the mines. Although company management (and indirectly, the British government) managed to counteract some of these efforts by Franco, much of the mine's pyrite production was channelled to Axis powers before and during World War II.

Rio Tinto's investment in Rhodesian copper mines did much to support the company through troubled times at its Spanish Rio Tinto operations spanning the Spanish Civil War, World War II and Franco's nationalistic policies. In the 1950s, the political situation made it increasingly difficult for mostly British and French owners to extract profits from Spanish operations, and the company decided to dispose of the mines from which it took its name. Thus, in 1954, Rio Tinto Company sold two-thirds of its stake in the Rio Tinto mines, disposing of the rest over the following years. The sale of the mines financed extensive exploration activities over the following decade.

The company's exploration activities presented the company with an abundance of opportunities, but it lacked sufficient capital and operating revenue to exploit those opportunities. This situation precipitated the next, and perhaps most significant, merger in the company's history. In 1962, Rio Tinto Company merged with the Australian firm Consolidated Zinc to form the Rio Tinto – Zinc Corporation (RTZ) and its main subsidiary, Conzinc Riotinto of Australia (CRA). The merger provided Rio Tinto the ability to exploit its new-found opportunities, and gave Consolidated Zinc a much larger asset base.

Major acquisitions following the Consolidated Zinc merger included US Borax, a major producer of borax, bought in 1968, Kennecott Utah Copper and BP's coal assets which were bought from BP in 1989, and a 70.7% interest in the New South Wales operations of Coal & Allied, also in 1989. In 1993, the company acquired Nerco and the United States coal mining businesses of Cordero Mining Company.

The company was part of the uranium producers' cartel, Societe d'Etudes de Recherches d'Uranium, which operated from 1972 to 1976. The other cartel members were based in Australia, France, and South Africa. It was formed by the major non-United States uranium producers to mitigate the impacts of US policy on the uranium market; to do so, the cartel engaged in bid rigging, price fixing, and market sharing. Westinghouse filed an antitrust lawsuit against cartel members in 1976 and the cartel disbanded.

RTZ and CRA were separately managed and operated, with CRA focusing on opportunities within Australasia and RTZ taking the rest of the world. However, the companies continued to trade separately, and RTZ's ownership of CRA dipped below 50% by 1986. The two companies' strategic needs eventually led to conflicts of interest regarding new mining opportunities, and shareholders of both companies determined a merger was in their mutual best interest. In 1995, the companies merged into a dual listed company, in which management was consolidated into a single entity and shareholder interests were aligned and equivalent, although maintained as shares in separately named entities. The merger also precipitated a name change; after two years as RTZ-CRA, RTZ became Rio Tinto plc and CRA became Rio Tinto Limited, referred to collectively as Rio Tinto.

=== Early 21st century ===
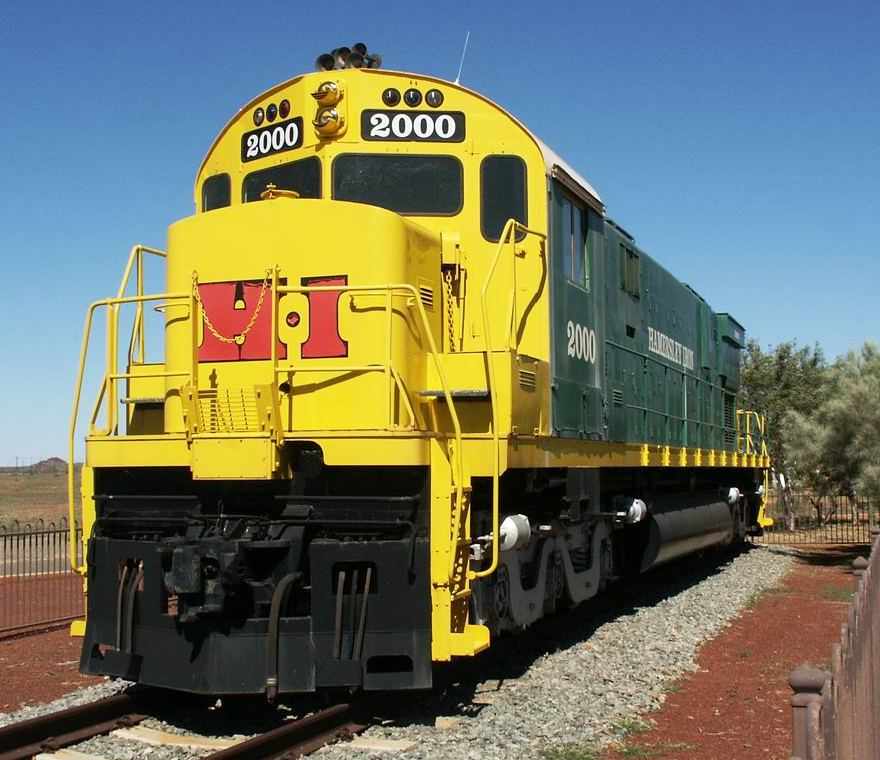
Pilbara Iron maintains the Pilbara Rail Company to serve its Western Australia iron ore mines.

The wordmark of Alcan after its purchase by Rio Tinto in 2007: The acquisition made Rio Tinto the largest aluminium producer in the world.

In 2000, Rio Tinto acquired North Limited, an Australian company with iron ore and uranium mines, for $2.8 billion. The takeover was partially motivated as a response to North Limited's 1999 bid to have Rio Tinto's Pilbara railway network declared open access. The Australian Competition & Consumer Commission regulatory body approved the acquisition in August 2000, and the purchase was completed in October of the same year. That year, Rio Tinto also bought North Limited and Ashton Mining for US$4 billion, adding additional resources in aluminium, iron ore, diamonds and coal. In 2001, it bought (under Coal & Allied) the Australian coal businesses of the Peabody Energy.

In 2000, Rio Tinto faced a federal lawsuit on behalf of Papua New Guinea due to the harm the company's mining operations at the Panguna Mine had to the environment for decades. Local communities filed this suit claiming that the local Kawerong-Jaba river delta was used as a dumping site for "more than one billion tons of mine waste". According to the lawsuit, the citizens are claiming that the mining giant used harmful chemicals and bulldozers to destroy the environment and specifically the rainforest and used their waterways as a dumping site for the chemicals and runoff caused by their mining operations.

On 14 November 2007, Rio Tinto completed its largest acquisition to date, purchasing Canadian aluminium company Alcan for $38.1 billion, as of 2014, "the largest mining deal ever completed". Alcan's chief executive, Jacynthe Côté, led the new division, renamed Rio Tinto Alcan with its headquarters situated in Montreal.

Activity in 2008 and 2009 was focused on divestments of assets to raise cash and refocus on core business opportunities. The company sold three major assets in 2008, raising about $3 billion in cash. In the first quarter of 2009, Rio Tinto reached agreements to sell its interests in the Corumbá iron ore mine and the Jacobs Ranch coal mine, and completed sales of an aluminium smelter in China and the company's potash operations, for an additional estimated $2.5 billion.

On 5 July 2009, four Rio Tinto employees were arrested in Shanghai for corruption and espionage. One of the arrested, Australian citizen Stern Hu, was "suspected of stealing Chinese state secrets for foreign countries and was detained on criminal charges", according to a spokesman for the Chinese foreign ministry. Stern Hu was also accused of bribery by Chinese steel mill executives for sensitive information during the iron ore contract negotiations.

In 2009, Chinese authorities began investigating allegations against Rio Tinto in what became known as the Rio Tinto espionage case. These included bribing executives from 16 of China's biggest steel mill companies to get hold of secret information. On 29 March 2010 four Rio Tinto employees including Australian citizen Stern Hu were found guilty of these charges and of accepting millions of dollars in bribes. They were ordered to pay hundreds of thousands of dollars in fines, and sentenced to 7 to 14 years in jail.

On 19 March 2010 Rio Tinto and its biggest shareholder, Chinalco, signed a memorandum of understanding to develop Rio Tinto's iron ore project in the Simandou mine in Simandou, Guinea. On 29 July 2010, Rio Tinto and Chinalco signed a binding agreement to establish this joint venture covering the development and operation of the Simandou mine.

Under the terms of the agreement, the joint venture maintains Rio Tinto's 95% interest in the Simandou project as follows: By providing US$1.35 billion on an earn-in basis through sole funding of ongoing development over a two-to-three-year period, Chalco, a subsidiary of Chinalco, would acquire a 47% interest in the joint venture. Once the full sum was paid, Rio Tinto would be left with a 50.35% interest in the project and Chalco would have 44.65%. The remaining 5% would be owned by the International Finance Corporation (IFC), the financing arm of the World Bank. On 22 April 2011 Rio Tinto, its subsidiary Simfer S.A. (Simfer), and the Guinean Government signed a settlement agreement that secured Rio Tinto's mining rights in Guinea to the southern concession of Simandou, known as blocks 3 and 4. According to the agreement, Simfer would pay US$700 million and receive mining concession and government approval of the proposed Chalco and Rio Tinto Simandou joint venture.

=== Recent history ===
In April 2011, Rio Tinto gained a majority stake in Riversdale Mining. The Securities & Exchange Commission investigated a $3 billion impairment charge against Rio Tinto regarding the deal. Riversdale Mining was an Australian coal mining company with significant interests in Mozambique. Rio Tinto bought it for $2.9 billion in an all-cash deal. Two years later they wrote down the value of the assets by $3 billion. Following the impairment charge, which included an additional $11 billion in asset write-downs, chief executive officer of Rio Tinto, Tom Albanese stepped down from his post and left the company. Rio later sold the assets for $50 million.

In 2011, the company rekindled its interest in potash when it entered a joint venture with Acron Group to develop the Albany potash development, in southern Saskatchewan, Canada. Following an exploration program, Acron in a June 2014 statement described Albany as "one of the best potash development opportunities in the world".

On 13 December 2011, an independent arbitrator cleared the way for Rio Tinto, which had owned 49% of Ivanhoe Mines (now known as Turquoise Hill Resources), to take it over: he said the $16 billion Canadian group's "poison pill" defence was not valid. Ivanhoe had developed Oyu Tolgoi in Mongolia, one of the world's largest-known copper deposits. On 28 January 2012, Rio Tinto gained control of Ivanhoe Mines and removed the management.

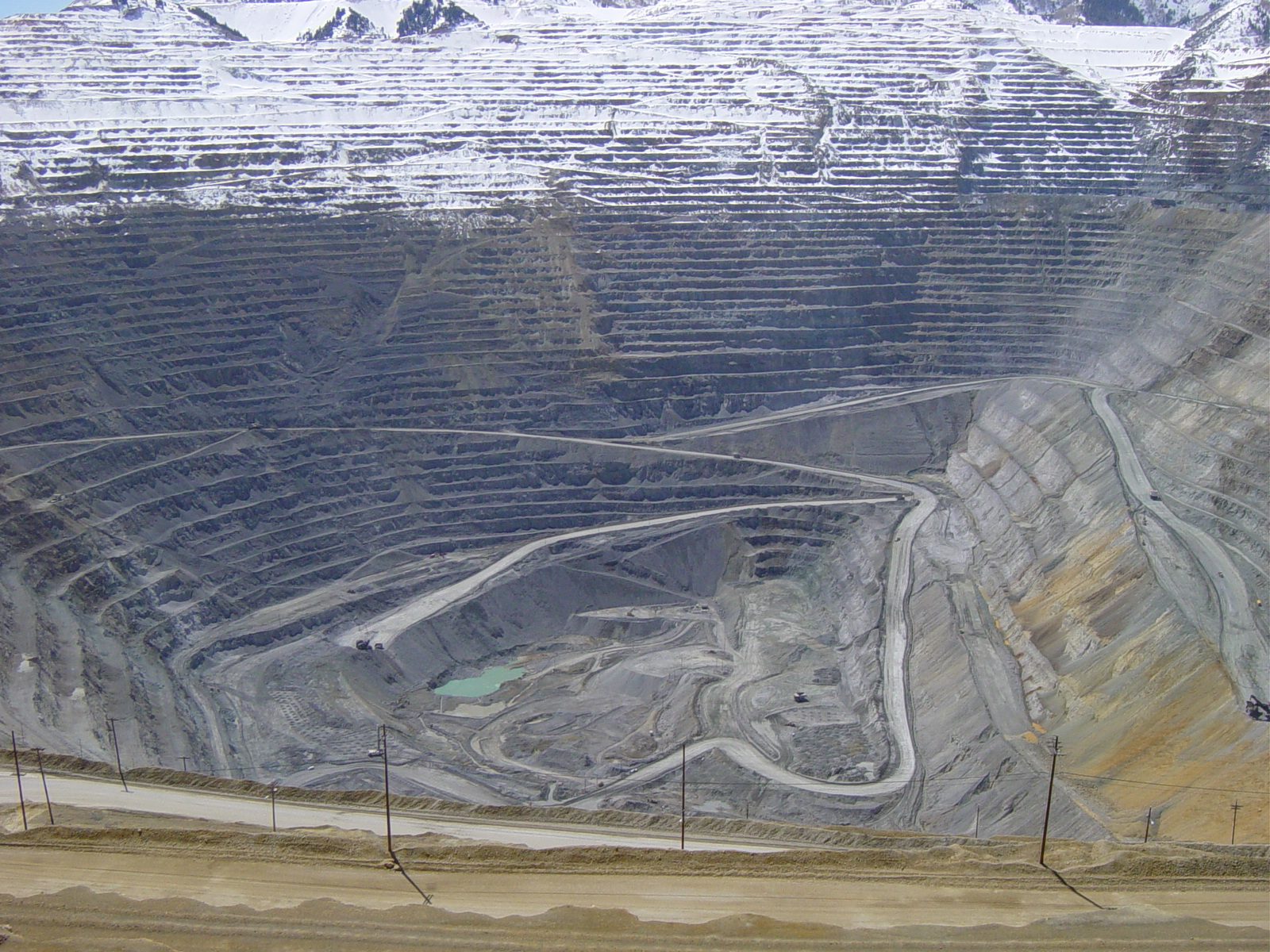
The Bingham Canyon Mine of Rio Tinto's subsidiary, Kennecott Utah Copper

The metals for the medals for the 2012 Summer Olympics were supplied from the Bingham Canyon Mine located in Utah and the Oyu Tolgoi mine in Mongolia, which caused uproar among many activist groups, especially in Utah due to their concern about the impact to the local cities. One person particularly bothered by this decision was the Commissioner of the London Games, Meredith Alexander, who quit her position and led a coalition of human rights and environmental groups during the "Greenwashed Gold Campaign".

In October 2013, Rio Tinto agreed to sell its majority stake in Australia's third-largest coal mine to Glencore and Sumitomo for a little over US$1 billion, as part of the firm's plans to focus on larger operations. Less than a year later, Rio Tinto rejected two merger proposals from Glencore, proffered in July and August 2014; the merger of Glencore and Rio Tinto would have created the world's largest mining company.

In May 2015, Rio Tinto announced plans to sell some of its aluminium assets as part of a possible $1 billion deal, two years after a similar but failed attempt.

In October 2015, Rio Tinto was criticised by the Guinean government for the many mining delays at the local Simandou mine. Cece Noramou, government official said the government was "running out of patience". President Alpha Conde himself said that "there have been people at Simandou for 15 years, 20 years, and they've never produced a ton of iron". Even before 2015, the Guinean government had expressed their displeasure and dissatisfaction with Rio Tinto; in 2008, the Guinean government annulled half of the company's Simandou rights and gave them to BSGR, a French–Israeli-owned mining company. In late 2016, Rio Tinto agreed to sell its stake in the Simandou iron ore mine to Chinalco and exit the deal. The deal was negotiated after the company's case against Vale and BSGR was dismissed at US District Court.

In 2016, Rio Tinto became embroiled in a number of corruption allegations over its acquisition of stakes in the Simandou iron ore mine in Guinea. The allegations centre around the payment of a $10.5 million bribe to François de Combret, a French banking consultant who was a friend and adviser of President Alpha Condé. Condé denied having any knowledge of the illegal transactions, but recordings obtained by France24 suggest otherwise. Also in early November 2016, the former mining minister of Guinea, Mahmoud Thiam, revealed that the head of Rio Tinto's operation in Guinea offered him a bribe in 2010 to win back control of the Simandou mine, and that his offer was supported by senior members of the company. In July 2017 the Serious Fraud Office announced the launch of a fraud and corruption investigation into the company's business practices in Guinea. The Australian Federal Police is also investigating the allegations. After the Serious Fraud Office investigation announcement, and amid a search for a new CEO, Rio director John Varley was forced to resign from his role in the company. On 6 March 2023, the US SEC announced charges against Rio Tinto plc for violations of the Foreign Corrupt Practices Act (FCPA) arising out of a bribery scheme involving a consultant in Guinea. The company agreed to pay a $15 million civil penalty to settle the SEC's charges.

In May 2020, to expand the Brockman 4 mine, Rio Tinto demolished an Australian Aboriginal sacred site in Juukan Gorge, Western Australia, which had evidence of 46,000 years of continual human occupation, and was considered the only inland prehistoric site in Australia to show signs of continual human occupation through the last Ice Age. The company later revealed it had three alternative options to preserve the site, but chose to destroy it without informing the traditional owners of the alternatives. Permission to destroy the site had been given in 2013 under the state Aboriginal Heritage Act 1972, which, however, has been under review since 2018. The Puutu Kunti Kurrama and Pinikura peoples, who are the local land custodians, had fought the decision. The destruction brought widespread criticism. On 31 May, Rio Tinto apologised for the distress caused. On 11 September 2020, it was announced that, as a result of the destruction at Juukan Gorge, CEO Jean-Sébastien Jacques and two other Rio Tinto executives would step down.

The company's chief financial officer, Jakob Stausholm, became the new chief executive on 1 January 2021.

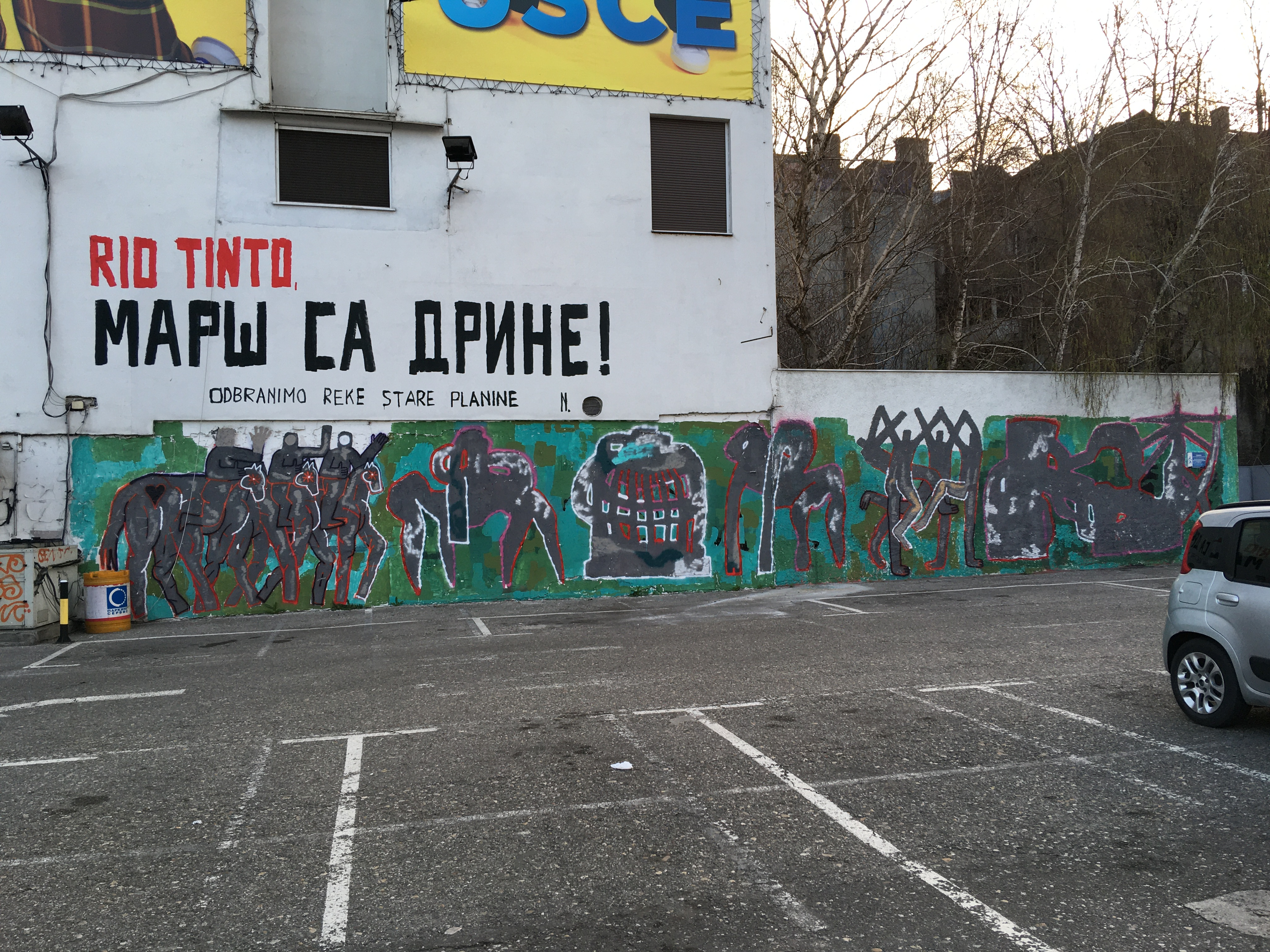
Rio Tinto Marš sa Drine! protest in Belgrade, Serbia, 2021

During 2021, a series of mass protests broke out in Serbia against the construction of a lithium mine in Western Serbia by the Rio Tinto corporation. Protesters blocked major roads and bridges in Belgrade and other major cities. In the town of Šabac, there was an incident when a member of the ruling party attacked the protesters with an excavator, and then the protesters were beaten by an armed group of hooligans. The project would make Serbia the biggest producer of lithium globally, and provide raw materials to more than 1 million electric cars. In June 2024, the constitutional court reverted the government's decision to remove Rio Tinto from the project, and the president of Serbia announced that he was expecting the company to reveal their final plans for the mine in July and that the mine might be built by 2028.

In February 2022, Rio Tinto released a report that described a work culture of bullying, harassment and racism, including twenty one complaints by women of actual or attempted rape or sexual assault in the past five years. According to the report, these harmful behaviours were often tolerated or normalised. "Harmful behaviour by serial perpetrators is often an open secret", Elizabeth Broderick said. On the whole, about 28% of women and 7% of men had experienced sexual harassment at Rio. But this rate rose to 41% for female workers at FIFO sites. Most women who responded had experienced "everyday sexism".

In March 2022, Rio Tinto completed the acquisition of Rincon Mining's lithium project in Argentina for $825 million, following approval by Australia's Foreign Investment Review Board.

In January 2023, the company announced that it had misplaced a capsule of radioactive material that was being transported from their Gudai-Darri mine in Western Australia. The capsule is a 8 by 6 mm cylinder containing a 19-gigabecquerel caesium-137 ceramic source. It has the capability of causing serious illness if it is not handled correctly. According to the company, the capsule was lost somewhere between Newman and Perth, a distance of 1,400 km. The company launched an investigation into the disappearance and are working alongside authorities. Later the same month the capsule was recovered by investigators and verified by the Australian Defence Forces.

In July 2023, it was announced Rio Tinto had acquired a 15 per cent stake in the Australian exploration and development company, Sovereign Metals for US $27.6 million.

In October 2024, Rio Tinto announced it would buy Arcadium Lithium for US$6.7 billion, in an all-cash deal for US$5.85 per each Arcadium Lithium share. The deal was closed in March 2025, with Arcadium Lithium becoming Rio Tinto's lithium unit, called Rio Tinto Lithium. With the purchase of Arcadium, Rio Tinto became the world's third largest lithium miner.

The Biden administration's regulation, completed in May 2024, required the only two copper smelters in the United States to reduce emissions of toxic pollutants such as lead, arsenic, mercury, benzene and dioxins. Shortly after beginning his second presidency, Trump classified copper as a strategically important raw material for defence, infrastructure and new technologies by decree and on 24 October 2025 suspended the regulation for two years. The US Department of Energy (DOE) has since been tasked with developing a plan to reduce emissions from copper smelters.

In May 2025, it was announced that Rio Tinto was partnering with Chilean state-owned Codelco for a lithium mine in northern Chile. The deal makes Rio Tinto the third private company to mine lithium in Chile. The company will invest $900 million and own just under half of the operation. In August the same year Rio Tinto announced a partnership with Chilean state-owned ENAMI to carry out the lithium project Salares Altoandinos in Atacama Region.

On 22 May 2025, the company announced its chief executive Jakob Stausholm will step down later in the year once it has selected his replacement. In July 2025, Rio Tinto announced the appointment of Simon Trott as its new chief executive, due to assume the role on 25 August 2025. Trott has been at the company for more than 20 years most recently leading its iron ore unit.

== Subsidiaries ==
The company has operations on six continents, but is mainly concentrated in Australia and Canada, and owns its mining operations through a complex web of wholly and partly owned subsidiaries.

- Energy Resources of Australia – 68.4%
- Hathor Exploration – 100%
- QIT-Fer et Titane – 100%
- Dampier Salt – 68.4%
- Iron Ore Company of Canada – 58.7%
- Pacific Aluminum – 100%
- Richards Bay Minerals – 74%

== Corporate status ==
Rio Tinto is primarily organised into four operational businesses, divided by product type:

- Iron ore
- Aluminium – aluminium, bauxite and alumina
- Copper & Diamonds – copper and by-products such as gold, silver, molybdenum and sulphuric acid, and the company's diamond interests
- Energy & Minerals – uranium interests, industrial minerals such as borax, salt and titanium dioxide. The corporation previously held coal production assets.

These operating groups are supported by separate divisions providing exploration and function support.

=== Stock structure and ownership ===
Rio Tinto is structured as a dual-listed company, with listings on both the London Stock Exchange (symbol: RIO), under the name "Rio Tinto Plc", and the Australian Securities Exchange (symbol: RIO) in Sydney, under the name "Rio Tinto Limited". The dual-listed company structure grants shareholders of the two companies the same proportional economic interests and ownership rights in the consolidated Rio Tinto, in such a way as to be equivalent to all shareholders of the two companies actually being shareholders in a single, unified entity. This structure was implemented to avoid adverse tax consequences and regulatory burdens. To eliminate currency exchange issues, the company's accounts are kept, and dividends paid, in United States dollars.

Rio Tinto is one of the largest companies listed on either exchange. As such, it is included in the widely quoted indices for each market: the FTSE 100 Index of the London Stock Exchange, and the S&P/ASX 200 index of the Australian Securities Exchange. LSE-listed shares in Rio Tinto plc can also be traded indirectly on the New York Stock Exchange via an American Depositary Receipt. As of 4 March 2009, Rio Tinto was the fourth-largest publicly listed mining company in the world, with a market capitalisation around $134 billion. As of mid-February 2009, shareholders were geographically distributed 42% in the United Kingdom, 18% in North America, 16% in Australia, 14% in Asia and 10% in continental Europe.

In May 2025, Shareholders in Rio Tinto rebuffed calls from Palliser Capital for the global mining group to ditch its primary London listing and focus on Australia. More than 80% of investor votes cast at its annual general meeting on Thursday were made against the proposal, with just 19% in favour.

==== BHP Billiton bid ====
On 8 November 2007, rival mining company BHP Billiton announced it was seeking to purchase Rio Tinto in an all-share deal. This offer was rejected by the board of Rio Tinto as "significantly undervalu[ing]" the company. Another attempt by BHP Billiton for a hostile takeover, valuing Rio Tinto at $147 billion, was rejected on the same grounds. Meanwhile, the Chinese government-owned resources group Chinalco and the US aluminium producer Alcoa purchased 12% of Rio Tinto's London-listed shares in a move that would block or severely complicate BHP Billiton's plans to buy the company. BHP Billiton's bid was withdrawn on 25 November 2008, with the BHP citing market instability from the 2008 financial crisis.

==== Chinalco investment ====
On 1 February 2009, Rio Tinto management announced it was in talks to receive a substantial equity infusion from Chinalco, a major Chinese state-controlled mining enterprise, in exchange for ownership interest in certain assets and bonds. Chinalco was already a major shareholder, having bought up 9% of the company in a surprise move in early 2008; its ownership stake had risen to 9.8% by 2014, making it Rio Tinto's biggest investor. The proposed investment structure reportedly involves $12.3 billion for the purchase of ownership interests of Rio Tinto assets in its iron ore, copper and aluminium operations, plus $7.2 billion for convertible bonds. The transaction would bring Chinalco's ownership of the company to roughly 18.5%. The deal is still pending approval from regulators in the United States and China, and has not yet been approved by shareholders, although regulatory approval has been received from Germany and the Australian Competition & Consumer Commission. The largest barrier to completing the investment may come from Rio Tinto's shareholders; support for the deal by shareholders was never overwhelming and has reportedly declined in 2009, as other financing options (such as a more traditional bond issuance) are beginning to appear more realistic as a viable alternative funding source. A shareholder vote on the proposed deal was expected in the third quarter of 2009.

Rio Tinto is believed to have pursued this combined asset and convertible bond sale to raise cash to satisfy its debt obligations, which required payments of $9.0 billion in October 2009 and $10.5 billion by the end of 2010. The company has also noted China's increasing appetite for commodities, and the potential for increased opportunities to exploit these market trends, as a key factor in recommending the transaction to its shareholders.

In March 2010, it was announced that Chinalco would invest $1.3 billion for a 44.65% stake in Rio Tinto's iron ore project in Simandou, Guinea. Rio Tinto retained 50.35% ownership at Simandou.

In November 2011, Rio joined with Chinalco to explore for copper resources in China's complex landscape, by setting up a new company, CRTX, 51% owned by Chinalco and 49% by Rio Tinto.

=== Management ===
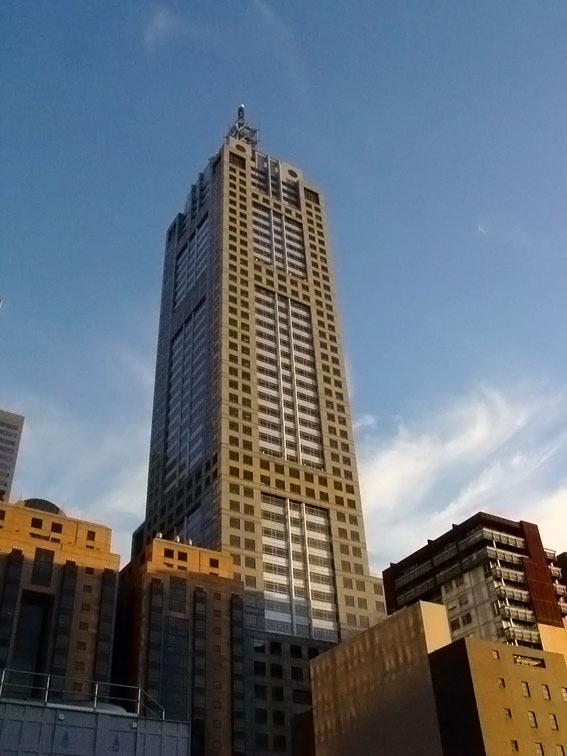
Rio Tinto's Australian headquarters are located at 120 Collins Street, Melbourne, Australia.

Under the company's dual-listed company structure, management powers of the Rio Tinto are consolidated in a single senior management group led by a board of directors and executive committee. The board of directors has both executive and non-executive members, while the executive committee is composed of the heads of major operational groups.

- Board of Directors
  - Executive Directors
    - Dominic Barton, chairman
    - Simon Trott, chief executive
  - Non-Executive Directors
    - Megan Clark
    - Hinda Gharbi
    - Simon McKeon
    - Simon Henry
    - Jennifer Nason
    - Sam Laidlaw
    - Ngaire Woods

Rio Tinto engages professional lobbyists to represent its interests in various jurisdictions. In South Australia, the company in represented by DPG Advisory Solutions.

== Operations ==
Rio Tinto's main business is the production of raw materials including copper, iron ore, bauxite, diamonds, uranium and industrial minerals including titanium dioxide, salt, gypsum and borates. Rio Tinto also performs processing on some of these materials, with plants dedicated to processing bauxite into alumina and aluminium, and smelting iron ore into iron. The company also produces other metals and minerals as by-products from the processing of its main resources, including gold, silver, molybdenum, sulphuric acid, nickel, potash, lead and zinc. Rio Tinto controls gross assets of $81 billion in value across the globe, with main concentrations in Australia (35%), Canada (34%), Europe (13%) and the United States (11%), and smaller holdings in South America (3%), Africa (3%) and Indonesia (1%).

Summary of 2008 production
Product	Amount	World ranking
Iron ore	153.4 million tonnes	2nd
Bauxite	34.987 million tonnes	1st
Alumina	9.009 million tonnes	2nd
Aluminium	4.062 million tonnes	2nd
Copper (mined)	698,500 tonnes	4th
Copper (refined)	321,600 tonnes	N/A
Molybdenum	10,600 tonnes	3rd
Gold	13 tonnes (460,000 ounces)	7th
Diamonds	4 tonnes (20.816 million carats)	3rd
Coal	160.3 million tonnes	N/A
Uranium	6,441 tonnes (14.2 million pounds)	3rd
Titanium dioxide	1.524 million tonnes	N/A, but at least 3rd
Borates	610,000 tonnes	1st

=== Iron ore: Rio Tinto Iron Ore ===
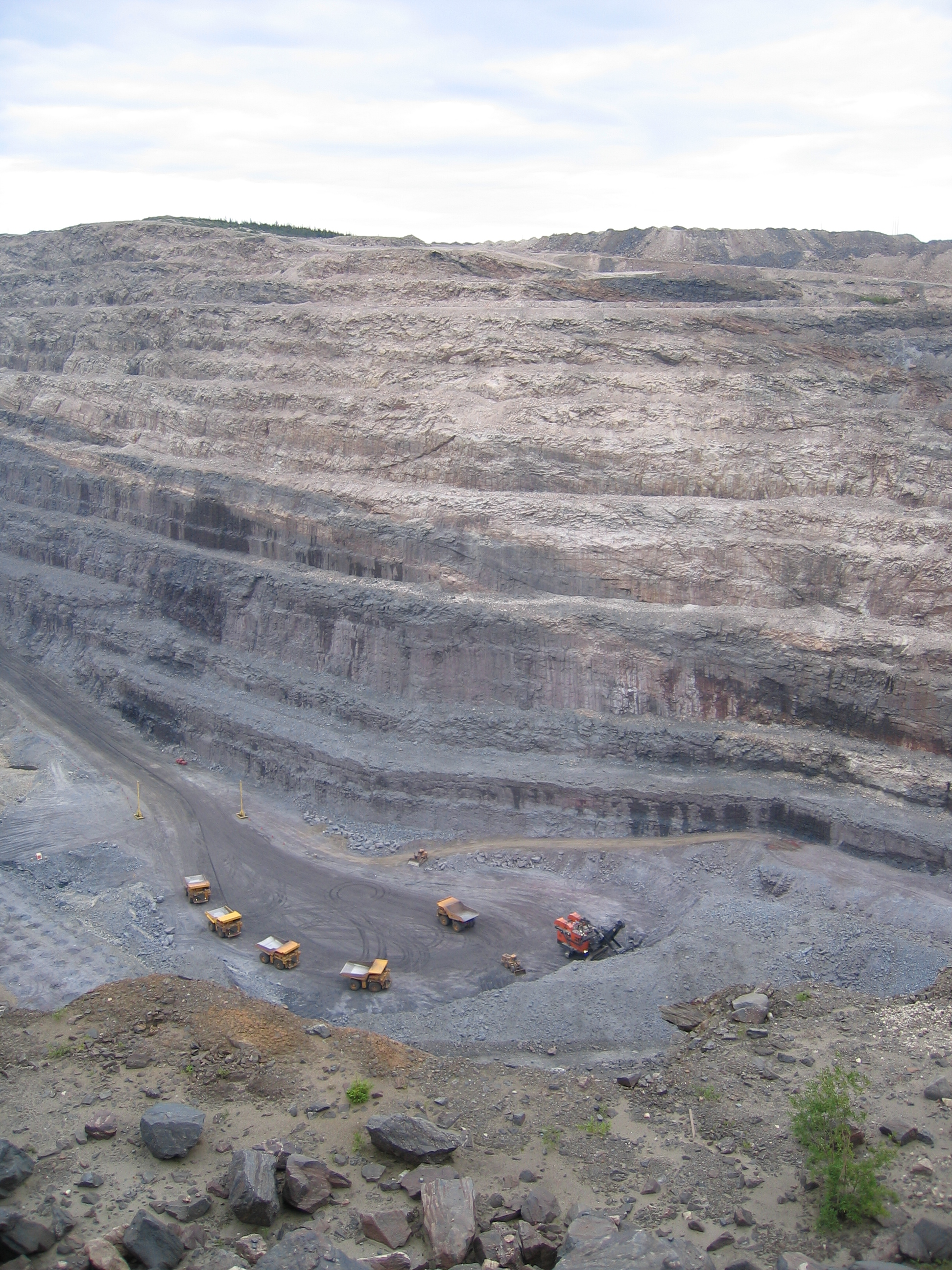
IOC mine site in Labrador

The Australian operations of Rio Tinto Iron Ore (RTIO) comprises an integrated iron ore operations in the Pilbara, Western Australia. The Pilbara iron ore operations include 16 iron ore mines, four independent port terminals, a 1,700-kilometre rail network and related infrastructure. The corporation also has had a majority stake in Iron Ore Company of Canada since its 2000 hostile takeover of North Limited.

=== Copper and by-products: Rio Tinto Copper ===
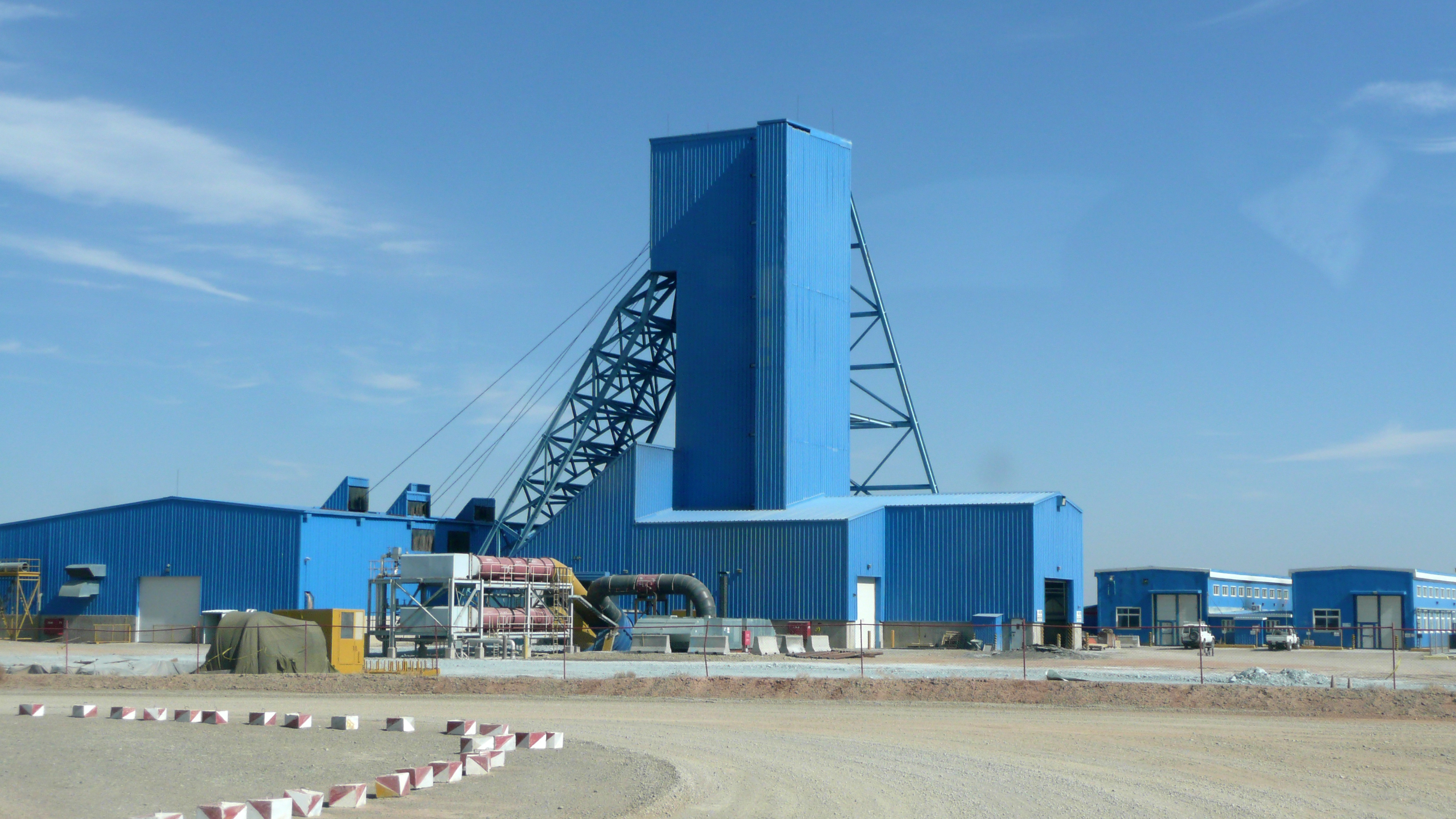
The Oyu Tolgoi mine underground mine is currently under development in Mongolia.

Copper was one of Rio Tinto's main products from its earliest days operating at the Río Tinto complex of mines in Spain. Since that time, the company has divested itself from its original Spanish mines, and grown its copper-mining capacity through acquisitions of major copper resources around the world. The copper group's main active mining interests are Oyu Tolgoi mine in Mongolia, Kennecott Utah Copper in the United States, and Minera Escondida in Chile. Most of these mines are joint ventures with other major mining companies, with Rio Tinto's ownership ranging from 30% to 80%; only Kennecott is wholly owned. Operations typically include mining of ore through to production of 99.99% purified copper, including extraction of economically valuable by-products. Together, Rio Tinto's share of copper production at its mines totalled nearly 700,000 tonnes, making the company the fourth-largest copper producer in the world.

Rio Tinto Copper continues to seek new opportunities for expansion, with major exploration activities at the Resolution Copper project in the United States, Winu in Australia, and Oyu Tolgoi underground mine in Mongolia. In addition, the company is seeking to become a major producer of nickel, with exploration projects currently underway in the United States and Indonesia.

Although not the primary focus of Rio Tinto Copper's operations, several economically valuable by-products are produced during the refining of copper ore into purified copper. Gold, silver, molybdenum and sulphuric acid are all removed from copper ore during processing. Due to the scale of Rio Tinto's copper mining and processing facilities, the company is also a leading producer of these materials, which drive substantial revenues to the company.

Sales of copper generated 8% of the company's 2008 revenues, and copper and by-product operations accounted for 16% of underlying earnings. Rio Tinto exclusively provided the metal to produce the 4,700 gold, silver and bronze medals at the London 2012 Olympic and Paralympic Games. This was the second time Rio Tinto had done so for Olympic medals, having previously provided the metals for the Salt Lake City 2002 Winter Olympics. Together, Rio Tinto's share of copper production at its mines totalled nearly 700,000 tonnes, making the company the fourth-largest copper producer in the world. Rio Tinto was the naming rights sponsor of Utah Soccer Stadium until 2022.

=== Aluminium ===
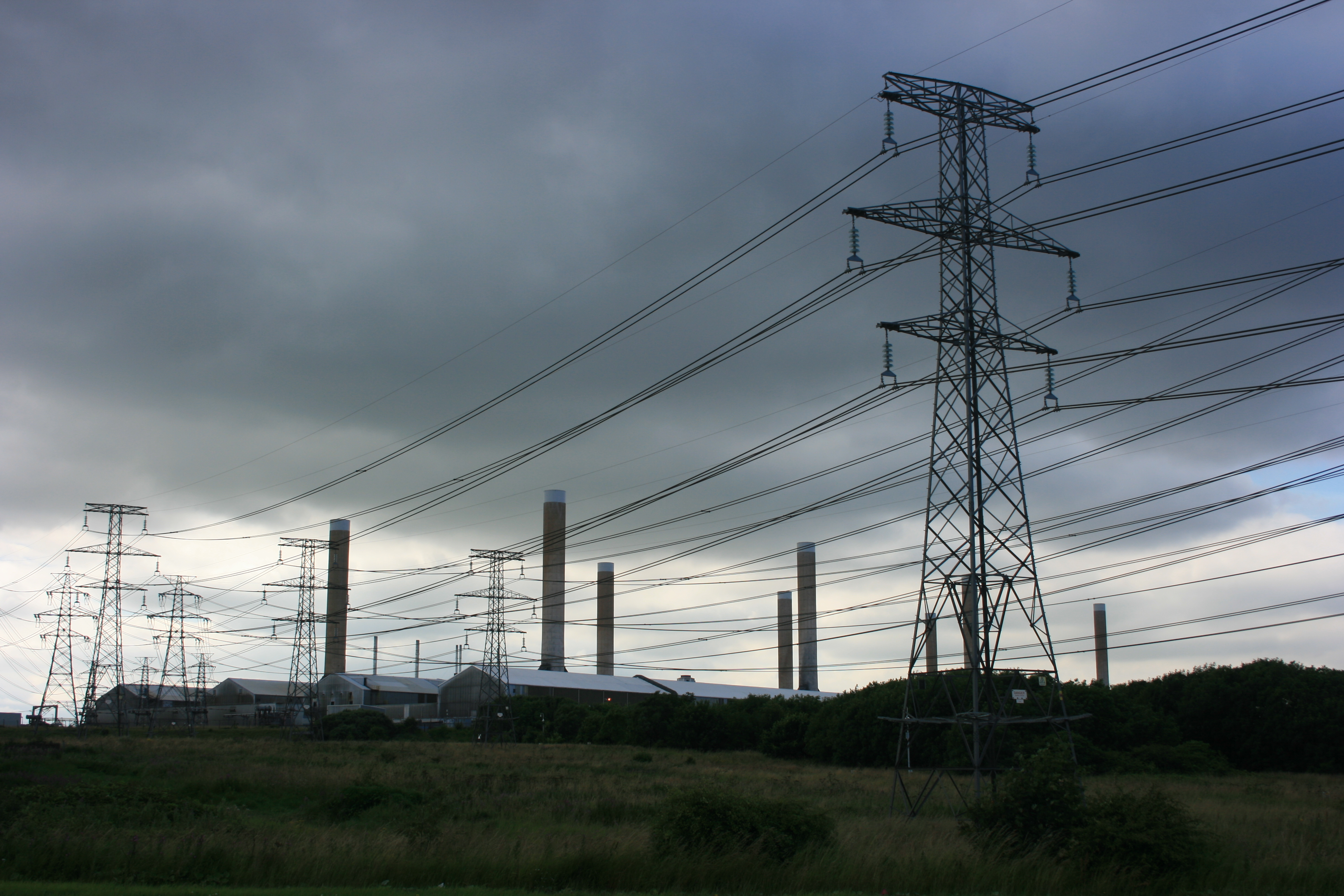
The Alcan Lynemouth Aluminium Smelter in Northumberland, England

Rio Tinto consolidated its aluminium-related businesses into its aluminium product group (originally named Rio Tinto Alcan), formed in late 2007, when Rio Tinto purchased the Canadian company Alcan for $38.1 billion. Combined with Rio Tinto's existing aluminium-related assets, the new aluminium division vaulted to the world number-one producer of bauxite, alumina and aluminium. Aluminium division kept key leadership from Alcan, and the company's headquarters remain in Montreal.

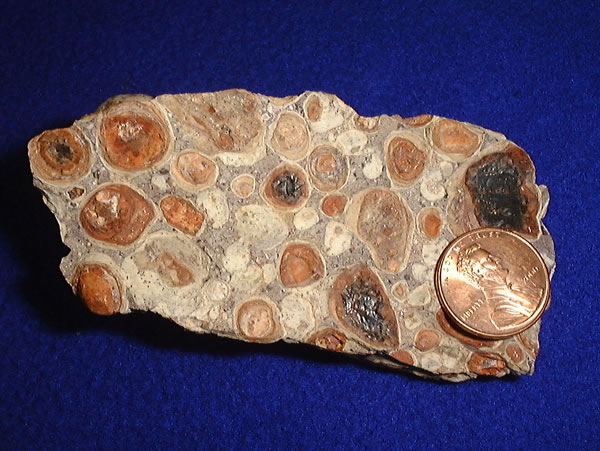
Rio Tinto Alcan is the world's leading producer of bauxite (shown here with a US cent for scale).

Rio Tinto divides its Aluminium operations into three main areas—bauxite, alumina and primary metal. The Bauxite and Alumina unit mines raw bauxite from locations in Australia, Brazil and Africa. The unit then refines the bauxite into alumina at refineries located in Australia, Brazil, Canada and France. The Primary Metal business unit's operations consist of smelting aluminium from alumina, with smelters located in 11 countries around the world. The Primary Metal group also operates several power plants to support the energy-intensive smelting process.

The aluminium division has interests in seven bauxite mines and deposits, six alumina refineries and six speciality alumina plants, 26 aluminium smelters, 13 power plants and 120 facilities for the manufacture of speciality products. The acquisition of Alcan operations in 2007 substantially increased Rio Tinto's asset base, revenues and profits: in 2008, 41% of company revenues and 10% of underlying earnings were attributable to the aluminium division.

=== Uranium: Rio Tinto Energy ===
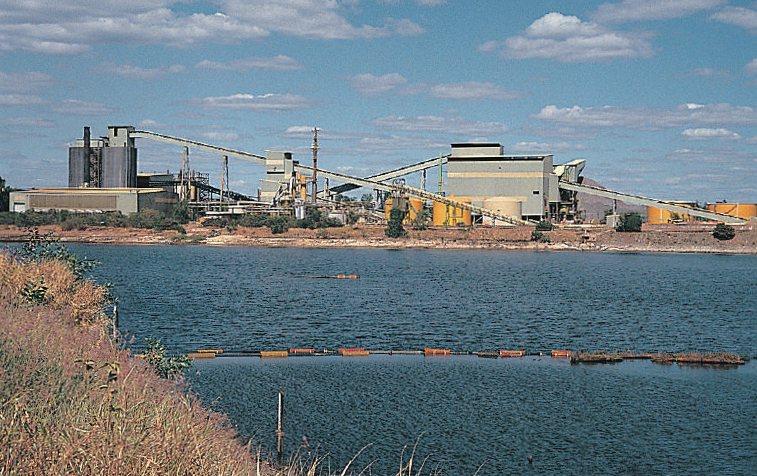
The Ranger Uranium Mine of Energy Resources of Australia, a Rio Tinto subsidiary

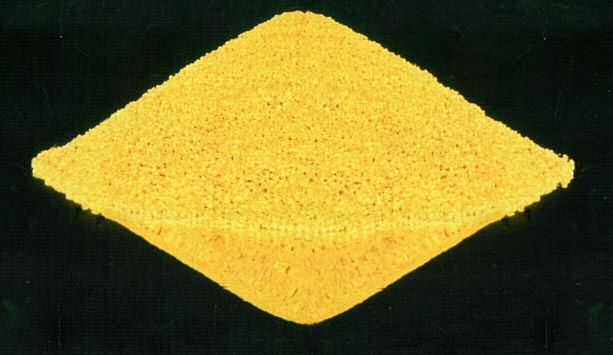
Rio Tinto was the third-leading producer of uranium in the world (here as yellowcake ore concentrate).

Rio Tinto Energy is a business group of Rio Tinto that was dedicated to the mining and sale of uranium. Rio Tinto's uranium operations were located at two mines: the Ranger Uranium Mine of Energy Resources of Australia and the Rössing uranium mine in Namibia. The unit is now focused on mine rehabilitation. The company was the third-largest producer of uranium in the world. According to Rio Tinto's website, the company instituted strict controls and contractual limitations on uranium exports, limiting uses to peaceful, nonexplosive uses only. Such controls are intended to limit use of the company's uranium production to use as fuel for nuclear power plants only, and not for use in the production of nuclear weapons. Rio Tinto Energy was responsible for 12% of revenues and 18% of underlying earnings in 2008.

Rio Tinto has divested or closed its remaining uranium operations since 2019. In 2019 it sold its remaining holdings in the Rössing uranium mine to China National Uranium Corporation Limited (CNUC) for an initial cash payment of $6.5 million plus a contingent payment of up to $100 million.

Mining finished at Ranger in late 2012 and the mine plant processed stockpiled ore until January 2021. Rio has tenure and access to the site, principally for rehabilitation activities, until 8 January 2026.

=== Diamonds: Rio Tinto Diamonds ===
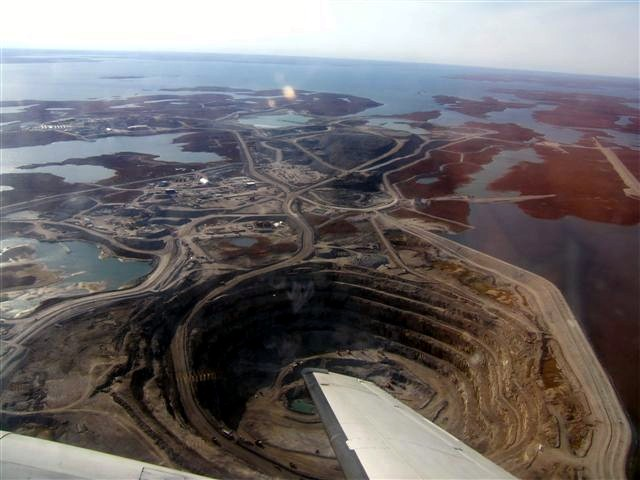
The Diavik Diamond Mine in the Northwest Territories of Canada

Rio Tinto Diamonds operates two diamond mines: the Diavik Diamond Mine in the Northwest Territories of Canada (60% ownership) and the Murowa diamond mine located in Zimbabwe (78% ownership). Together, these two mines produce 20% of the world's annual production of rough diamonds, making Rio Tinto the world's third-largest producer of mined diamonds.

Rio Tinto formerly operated the Argyle Diamond Mine in Western Australia (100% ownership).

The diamond business unit's most advanced exploration project is the Falcon Project in Saskatchewan, Canada, where Rio Tinto owns 60% of the project in a joint venture with Star Diamond Corp. Rio Tinto Diamonds generated 1% of revenues and earnings for Rio Tinto in 2008.

=== Industrial minerals: Rio Tinto Minerals ===
Rio Tinto Minerals is a diverse business group with mining and processing interest in borates, salt and gypsum. Rio Tinto Borax, with operations in California, supplies nearly one-third of the world's annual demand for refined borates. The Minerals group is also majority owner of Dampier Salt, which produces over 9 million tonnes of salt and 1.5 million tonnes of gypsum annually from its three facilities in north-west Australia. Rio Tinto Minerals accounted for 6% of company revenues, and contributed 3% to earnings in 2008.

On 31 January 2010, the management of US Borax locked out its hourly workforce, replacing the workers with nonunion workers and managers from other Rio Tinto operations. The 560 International Longshore and Warehouse Union Local 30 members immediately began a fireside vigil that garnered national and international labour attention. ILWU filed several unfair labour practices against the company, including an illegal lock-out claim.

In 2024–2025 Rio Tinto won a bid to associate with Chile's National Mining Enterprise (ENAMI) in the lithium mining project of Salares Altoandinos.

=== Iron products and titanium: Rio Tinto Iron and Titanium ===
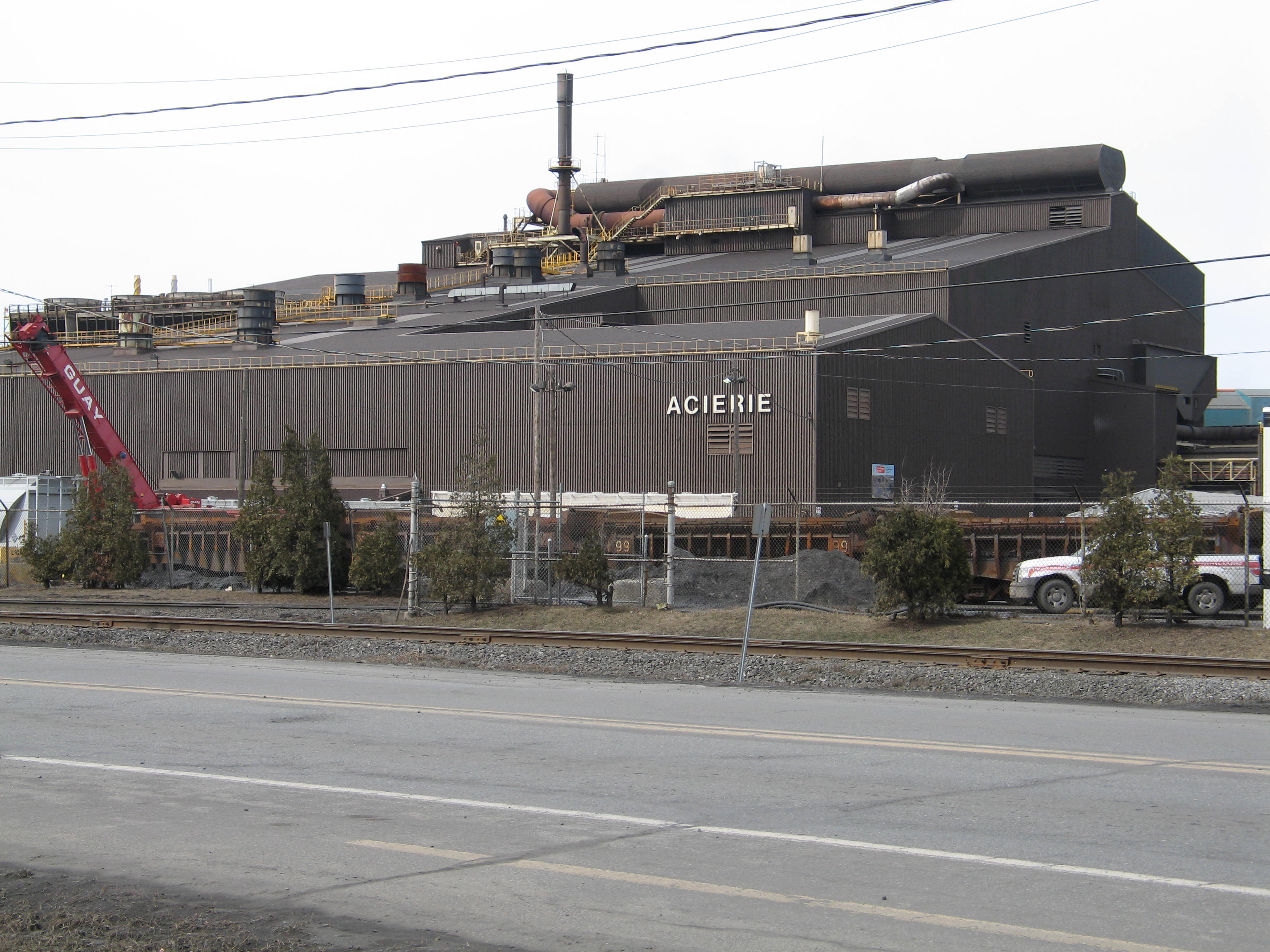
Rio Tinto plant in Sorel Quebec

Titanium dioxide is mined at three locations: in Lac Allard Quebec Canada, South Africa and Mandena mine, Madagascar, and refined at QIT-Fer et Titane's Canadian facilities.

A media report in October 2013 revealed that the corporation plans to establish a fully automated railroad system for the transportation of iron ore across the Australian outback by 2015, thereby replacing the corporation's train drivers. The United Kingdom-based transport historian Christian Wolmar stated at the same time that the train drivers are most likely the highest-paid members of the occupation in the world at that time. As part of an overall strategy to increase profit margins, the corporation is spending US$518 million on the project.

=== Development of autonomous technologies ===
Rio Tinto is a global leader in the development of autonomous technologies for use in the mining sector. As of 2018, Rio Tinto's fleet of 80 autonomous Komatsu vehicles had moved over 1 billion tonnes of ore and waste material in Western Australia's Pilbara region.

Furthermore, in late 2017 Rio Tinto announced funding for their Koodaideri Mine in Western Australia, which Rio Tinto had dubbed their "intelligent mine."

== Financial results ==
Rio Tinto's revenues and earnings have grown substantially in 2003–2010, with one of the largest increases attributable to the company's acquisition of Alcan in 2007. Although its operating margin is significantly affected by the market prices of the commodities it produces, it has remained profitable over its recent history.

Earnings data (in US$ millions)
	2003	2004	2005	2006	2007	2008	2009	2010	2011	2012	2013	2014	2015	2016	2017	2018	2019	2020	2021	2022	2023	2024	2025
Net sales revenue	9,228	11,344	19,033	22,465	29,700	54,264	41,825	56,576	60,537	50,967	51,171	47,664	34,829	33,781	40,030	40,522	43,165	44,611	63,495	55,554	54,041	53,658	57,638
Operating profit	2,392	3,850	7,698	10,352	10,155	11,233	8,292	20,795	14,052	(2,576)	7,912	12,560	3,976	7,116	14,474	18,200	11,767	17,142	30,859	20,508	15,498	16,491	14,936
Net earnings	1,508	2,813	5,498	7,867	7,746	4,609	5,335	15,184	6,765	(3,004)	1,079	6,499	(1,719)	4,776	8,851	13,925	6,972	10,400	22,575	13,076	9,953	11,574	10,249
Cash flow from operations	3,486	4,449	8,257	10,923	12,569	20,668	13,834	23,530	27,388	16,450	20,131	19,194	12,312	11,621	17,487	16,455	20,374	22,416	35,367	24,037	20,861	20,926	22,223
Operating margin	26%	34%	40%	46%	34%	21%	20%	37%	23%	(5)%	15%	26%	11%	21%	36%	45%	27%	38%	49%	37%	29%	31%	26%

== Environmental issues ==
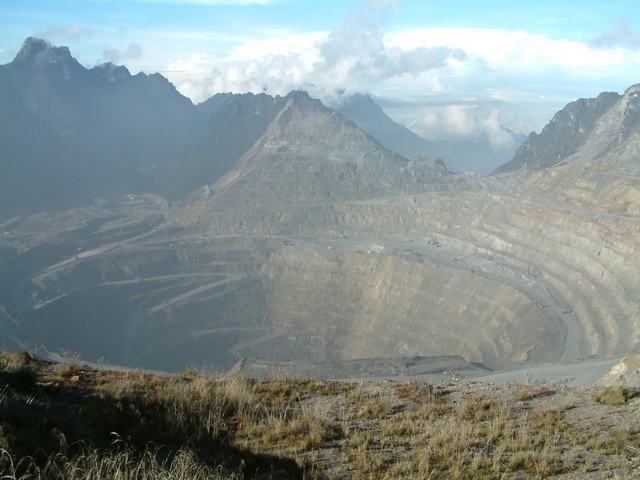
Rio Tinto owns a 40% stake in the Grasberg mine in Indonesia; it has been the focus of environmental concerns. (Photo by Alfindra Primaldhi)

=== Grasberg Mine – Indonesia ===
Rio Tinto has been criticised by the government of Norway, which divested itself from Rio Tinto shares and banned further investment due to environmental concerns. Claims of severe environmental damages related to Rio Tinto's engagement in the Grasberg mine in Indonesia led the Government Pension Fund of Norway to exclude Rio Tinto from its investment portfolio. The fund, which is said to be the world's second-largest pension fund, sold shares in the company valued at 4.85 billion kr (US$855 million) to avoid contributing to environmental damages caused by the company. Rio Tinto disputes the claims of environmental damage at the Grasberg mine.

=== Resolution Copper Mine – Arizona, U.S. ===
As part of a rider of the National Defense Authorization Act, the United States government agreed in 2014 to hand over the Oak Flat sacred preserve in Arizona to a joint venture of Rio Tinto and BHP Billiton to build the Resolution Copper mine. The process entailed the transfer of 3,000 acres of federally owned preserve land to Rio in exchange for 4,500 acres of adjacent land in the area. Under the Biden administration, the proposal would have allowed for the purchase of nearly 600 acres by the town of Superior to expand its airport and develop new industrial and residential infrastructure. The proposal has been opposed by environmentalists and the Apache tribe, who argue that the project, if it goes forward, would collapse a region two miles (3.2 km) wide around Oak Flat into a sinkhole 1,100 feet (340 m) deep, destroying sacred burial grounds and ecologically sensitive land considered by several tribes to be home to their deities.

=== Carbon dioxide emissions ===
According to The Guardian, Rio Tinto is one of the top 100 industrial greenhouse gas producers in the world, accounting for 0.75 per cent of global industrial greenhouse gas emissions between 1988 and 2015. In 2016, Rio Tinto estimated to have produced 32 million tonnes of carbon dioxide equivalent in its own climate change report.

== See also ==
- Riotinto Railway
- Tourist Mining Train
