= Sharoe Green =

Coordinates: 53.793°N 2.705°W

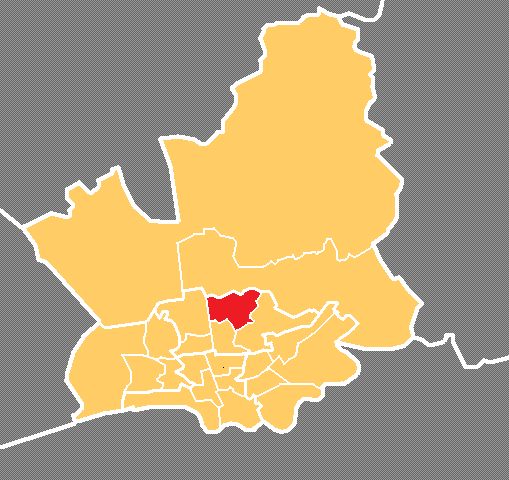
- Ward location in the City of Preston district

- Location in Preston Location within Lancashire
- Population: 8,300 (2021)
- District: City of Preston
- Ceremonial county: Lancashire
- Region: North West
- Country: England
- Sovereign state: United Kingdom
- UK Parliament: Ribble Valley
- Councillors: Maxwell Green – Conservative; David Walker – Conservative; Connor Dwyer – Labour

Sharoe Green (/ˈʃɛrə/ SHERR-ə) is a largely residential suburban area of Preston, Lancashire, England, and an electoral ward. It is nowadays usually considered to be a district of the larger suburb of Fulwood (and formed part of the pre-1974 Fulwood Urban District). Royal Preston Hospital, the largest hospital in Lancashire and sole main provider of NHS hospital treatment in Preston, is within the ward boundaries, as is Preston College, a number of secondary and primary schools, and Preston Golf Course.

Sharoe Green is a district of Preston with its near neighbour Sherwood, positioned to the far northeast of the city centre adjoining Deepdale. Its major transport links are served by the local and national bus routes criss-crossing its boundaries. The ward of Sharoe Green is a three-member electoral division, returning three councillors to Town Hall. At Lancashire County Council, Sharoe Green is predominantly covered by the Preston North division (County Councillor Ron Woollam (Conservative), with areas of Sharoe Green south of St Vincent's Road represented in the Preston Central East division (County Councillor Frank De Molfetta, Labour). Between 2010 and 2024 Sharoe Green was within the boundaries of the Wyre and Preston North parliamentary constituency, however, following the 2023 Boundary Commission review Sharoe Green was moved into the Ribble Valley constituency for the 2024 General Election.

== Current councillors ==
Election	Member	Party
2021 Preston City Council election	David Walker	Conservative Party
2022 Preston City Council election	Maxwell Green	Conservative Party
2023 Preston City Council election	Connor Dwyer	Labour Party

== Demographics ==
At the 2001 Census, the population of Sharoe Green was 6,819, with over 80% regarding themselves as Christian. At the 2008 local elections in Preston, Sharoe Green had a valid electorate of 5,103, increasing again to 6,279 at the 2011 Census.

At the 2021 Census, Sharoe Green has a population of 8,300 across 3,400 households. 69.6% of ward residents are White and 24.4% Asian/Asian British. 55.9% of residents regard themselves as Christian, 17.4% of no religion, and 14.6% Muslim.
