= 2023 Preston election =

2023 Preston election may refer to:

- 2023 Preston provincial by-election in Canada
- 2023 Preston City Council election in England
