= 2023 Hyndburn Borough Council election =

Hyndburn Borough Council local election

← 2022	4 May 2023	2024 →

12 of 35 seats to Hyndburn Borough Council 18 seats needed for a majority

	First party	Second party
Leader	Marlene Haworth	Munsif Dad
Party	Conservative	Labour
Seats before	15	13
Seats after	16	16
Seat change	▲1	▲3
	Third party	Fourth party
Leader	Miles Parkinson	Paddy Short
Party	Independent	Green
Seats before	5	2
Seats after	1	2
Seat change	▼4	Steady
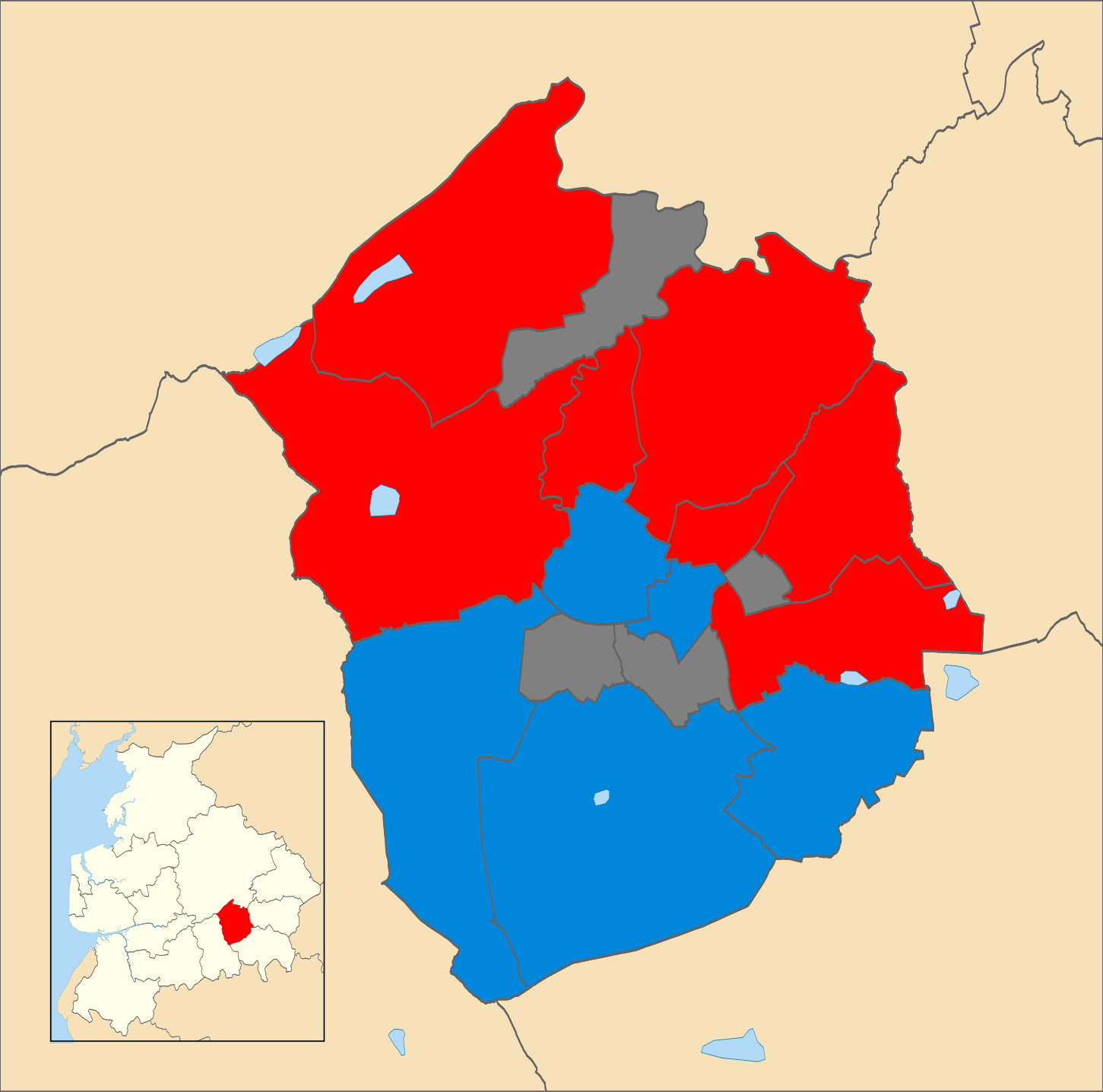
- 2023 local election results in Hyndburn Labour Conservative Not contested
Leader before election
Miles Parkinson
Independent
No overall control
Leader after election
Marlene Haworth
Conservative
No overall control

The 2023 Hyndburn Borough Council election took place on 4 May 2023 to elect 12 of the 35 members of Hyndburn Borough Council in Lancashire, England, being the usual approximate third of the council. This was on the same day as other local elections across England. The council remained under no overall control, and the leader of the council, independent councillor Miles Parkinson, lost his seat. A Conservative minority administration subsequently formed.

== Background ==
Before the election, Labour had a minority of 13 councillors, and a coalition of the Conservatives 15 councillors, along with 5 Independent councillors and 2 Green councillors had been in control of this Hyndburn Borough Council following the May 2022 elections, with former Labour leader turned Independent, Miles Parkinson, continuing to serve as council leader, for the past year.

Labour were defending 8 seats and Conservatives were defending 4 seats. Five of the previous Labour-won seats and one of the previous Conservative-won seats, from 2019, were held by councillors who have since quit the party or switched to another party. One former Labour seat, which was vacated last year forcing a by-election, was subsequently won by a Conservative candidate, who was standing again, for a full 4 year term.

As a result of the Elections Act 2022 electors will, for the first time, be asked to present photographic identification to polling staff in order to cast their vote. Postal voters are not affected.

== Council composition ==
Prior to the election the composition of the council was:

- Conservative 15
- Labour 13
- Independent 5
- Green Party of England and Wales 2

In this election, there were 12 Labour Party candidates, 11 Conservative Party candidates, 7 Independent candidates, 5 Green Party candidates, 2 Liberal Democrats candidates and 1 Reform UK candidate.

Of the 7 Independent candidates running, two different candidates were running in both the Altham and Milnshaw wards and the remaining three candidates were running alone in the Barnfield, Huncoat and Overton wards. The Greens were running five candidates, across the Baxenden, Clayton-le-Moors, Overton, Rishton and St. Oswald's wards. The Liberal Democrats were running just two candidates, in the Rishton and St. Oswald's wards. The single Reform UK candidate was only running in the Clayton-le-Moors ward. And in only the three wards of Central, Church and Immanuel, were there just two-candidates running (Labour vs Conservative).

Hyndburn Borough Council's two existing Green Party councillors (Paddy Short & Caroline Montague) and only one of the current sitting Independent councillors (Joyce Plummer) are not up for re-election this year. Of the other four existing Independent councillors, just two (Miles and June) would be standing for re-election this year and where the other two (Eamonn and Patrick) were standing-down.

== Overview ==
Before the election the council was run by a coalition of the Conservatives (15 councillors) and independents (5 councillors), with independent councillor Miles Parkinson being leader of the council. He had previously been a Labour councillor and had led a Labour majority administration from 2011 until early 2022 when he and several others left Labour to sit as independents, putting the council under no overall control. Parkinson remainder leader of the council with support from the Conservatives and independents. The Labour group immediately prior to the 2023 election had 13 councillors, and there were also two Green councillors (both of whom had originally been elected as Labour councillors).

After the election both Labour and the Conservatives were left with 16 councillors. None of the independent or other party candidates who stood were elected. It was announced shortly after the election that a minority Conservative administration would operate with informal support from the Greens and the remaining independent councillor. In the event, the two Green councillors did not attend the subsequent annual council meeting on 18 May 2023, when a Conservative minority administration led by Marlene Haworth was voted into office with the support of the one independent councillor.

== Local election result ==
The majority grouping of councillors as the headline result of the election, was tied; with both the Conservative party and the Labour Party each holding 16-seats; two seats short of the 18+ majority needed for full control.

After this election, the composition of the council's 35 seats was -

- Conservative 16
- Labour 16
- Green Party of England and Wales 2
- Independent 1

The overall results were:

2023 Hyndburn Borough Council election
Party	This election			Full council			This election		
Party	Seats	Net	Seats %	Other	Total	Total %	Votes	Votes %	+/−
Labour	7	▲3	58.3	9	16	45.7	8,058	51.9	+6.0
Conservative	5	▲1	41.7	11	16	45.7	5,496	35.4	-7.4
Independent	0	▼4	0.0	1	1	2.9	1,331	8.6	+1.9
Green	0	Steady	0.0	2	2	5.7	359	2.3	N/A
Liberal Democrats	0	Steady	0.0	0	0	0.0	93	0.6	N/A
Reform UK	0	Steady	0.0	0	0	0.0	88	0.6	-3.1

The overall turnout was 33.76%.

NB: Four (of the 16) Council wards, where seats will NOT be up for re-election in 2023, include the following wards - Netherton, Peel, Spring Hill and St. Andrews' in Oswaldtwistle.

Previous Councillors who are looking to Stand-Down in May 2023 included – Eamonn Higgins (Labour - Huncoat) and Patrick McGinley (Independent - Overton).

== Ward results ==
Following the notice of election, the statement of persons nominated was released on 5 April 2023. The results for each ward were as follows, with an asterisk(*) indicating a sitting councillor standing for re-election.

=== Altham ===
Altham
Party	Candidate	Votes	%	±%
Labour	Stephen Button	638	51.53	−7.32
Independent	Miles Parkinson*	514	41.52	N/A
Independent	Wayne Fitzharris	76	6.14	N/A
Majority		124	10.01	N/A
Rejected ballots		7	0.57	
Turnout		1,238	31.88	3.41
Registered electors		3,883		
Labour gain from Independent				

The previous incumbent, Miles Parkinson, had been elected as a Labour councillor but had left the party and was standing as an Independent in this election.

=== Barnfield ===
Barnfield
Party	Candidate	Votes	%	±%
Labour	Michael David Booth	414	41.23	−19.76
Independent	June Lillian Mary Harrison*	390	38.84	N/A
Conservative	Shahed Mahmood	196	19.52	−15.14
Majority		24	2.39	N/A
Rejected ballots		4	0.40	
Turnout		1,004	30.66	0.42
Registered electors		3,275		
Labour gain from Independent				

The previous incumbent, June Harrison, had been elected as a Labour councillor in 2019 but had left the party in May 2022 and sat as an independent for the remainder of her term.

=== Baxenden ===
Baxenden
Party	Candidate	Votes	%	±%
Conservative	Kathleen Iris Pratt* (Kath Pratt)	549	47.95	−6.68
Labour	Zoe Clare Emmett	520	45.41	2.73
Green	Louise Clare Preston	69	6.03	N/A
Majority		29	2.54	N/A
Rejected ballots		7	0.61	
Turnout		1,145	36.65	−0.83
Registered electors		3,124		
Conservative hold		Swing	-4.71	

=== Central ===
Central
Party	Candidate	Votes	%	±%
Conservative	Mohammed Younis	1,043	51.61	11.44
Labour	Mohammad Ayub*	959	47.45	−11.37
Majority		84	4.16	N/A
Rejected ballots		17	0.84	
Turnout		2,021	52.41	3.17
Registered electors		3,856		
Conservative gain from Labour		Swing	11.41	

=== Church ===
Church
Party	Candidate	Votes	%	±%
Conservative	Loraine Cox*	581	51.14	17.18
Labour	Jemshad Ahmed	547	48.15	−14.21
Majority		34	2.99	N/A
Rejected ballots		7	0.62	
Turnout		1,136	32.27	2.75
Registered electors		3,520		
Conservative hold		Swing	15.70	

Loraine Cox had been elected as a Labour councillor in 2019 but had left the party in 2022 and later joined the Conservatives. Her husband Paul stood for Labour and won in the Milnshaw ward.

=== Clayton-le-Moors ===
Clayton-le-Moors
Party	Candidate	Votes	%	±%
Labour	Melissa Margaret Fisher*	590	53.44	2.17
Conservative	Bernadette Parkinson	380	34.42	−8.37
Reform UK	Richard John Oakley	88	7.97	N/A
Green	Alia Qadar Blacow	47	4.26	N/A
Majority		210	19.02	N/A
Rejected ballots		4	0.36	
Turnout		1,104	32.25	4.02
Registered electors		3,423		
Labour hold		Swing	5.27	

=== Huncoat ===
Huncoat
Party	Candidate	Votes	%	±%
Labour	David Parkins	915	79.15	17.63
Conservative	Jordan Fox	173	14.96	−15.06
Independent	David James Navin	58	5.02	N/A
Majority		742	64.19	N/A
Rejected ballots		10	0.87	
Turnout		1,156	32.72	5.07
Registered electors		3,533		
Labour gain from Independent		Swing	16.35	

The previous incumbent, Eamonn Higgins, had been elected as a Labour councillor in 2019 but left the party in March 2022 and sat as an independent for the remainder of his term. He did not stand for re-election.

=== Immanuel ===
Immanuel
Party	Candidate	Votes	%	±%
Conservative	Judith Helen Addison*	572	54.11	−11.88
Labour	Andrew Peter Gilbert	467	44.18	14.44
Majority		105	9.93	N/A
Rejected ballots		18	1.70	
Turnout		1,057	31.07	4.64
Registered electors		3,402		
Conservative hold		Swing	-13.16	

=== Milnshaw ===
Milnshaw
Party	Candidate	Votes	%	±%
Labour	Paul Ian Cox*	605	58.34	−4.35
Independent	Malcolm Eric Pritchard	207	19.96	N/A
Conservative	Andrew Philip Lund	195	18.80	2.58
Independent	Navid Mohammed Afzal	24	2.31	N/A
Majority		398	38.38	N/A
Rejected ballots		6	0.57	
Turnout		1,037	29.18	−1.33
Registered electors		3,554		
Labour hold				

=== Overton ===
Overton
Party	Candidate	Votes	%	±%
Labour	Heather Margaret Anderson	920	62.54	17.73
Conservative	Ken James Moss	405	27.53	−23.36
Green	Julie Carole Stubbins	80	5.44	N/A
Independent	Paul Graeme Knighton	62	4.21	N/A
Majority		515	35.01	N/A
Rejected ballots		4	0.27	
Turnout		1,471	31.51	0.38
Registered electors		4,669		
Labour gain from Independent		Swing	20.55	

The previous incumbent, Patrick McGinley, had been elected as a Conservative councillor in 2019 but left the party in January 2021 and sat as an independent for the remainder of his term. He did not stand for re-election.

=== Rishton ===
Rishton
Party	Candidate	Votes	%	±%
Labour	Katie-Louise Walsh* (Kate Walsh)	880	55.66	5.84
Conservative	David Heap	595	37.63	−7.67
Green	Alexis Lee Kristan (Lex Kristan)	63	3.98	N/A
Liberal Democrats	Adam John Thomas Waller-Slack	35	2.21	N/A
Majority		285	17.93	N/A
Rejected ballots		7	0.44	
Turnout		1,581	32.23	5.56
Registered electors		4,906		
Labour hold		Swing	6.76	

=== St Oswald's ===
St Oswald's
Party	Candidate	Votes	%	±%
Conservative	Zak Khan*	807	51.33	19.07
Labour	Stewart Thurston Eaves	603	38.36	−1.34
Green	Michael David Miller	100	6.36	N/A
Liberal Democrats	Beth Waller-Slack	58	3.69	N/A
Majority		204	12.97	N/A
Rejected ballots		3	0.19	
Turnout		1,572	32.68	−0.48
Registered electors		4,811		
Conservative hold		Swing	10.21	
