= 2023 Harlow District Council election =

- 4 May 2023

11 out of 33 seats to Harlow District Council 17 seats needed for a majority
- Turnout: 25.2%

	First party	Second party
Leader	Russell Perrin	Chris Vince
Party	Conservative	Labour
Last election	23 seats, 48.1%	10 seats, 40.1%
Seats before	20	13
Seats won	5	6
Seats after	21	12
Seat change	▲1	▼1
Popular vote	6,675	7,041
Percentage	41.5%	43.8%
Swing	▼6.6%	▲3.7%
- Winner of each seat at the 2023 Harlow District Council election
Leader before election
Russell Perrin
Conservative
Leader after election
Dan Swords
Conservative

The 2023 Harlow District Council election took place on 4 May 2023 to elect members of Harlow District Council in Essex, England. This was on the same day as other local elections across England. One third of the council was up for election.

The Conservatives retained their majority on the council. Immediately after the election the Conservative leader of the council, Russell Perrin, announced his resignation as leader. At the subsequent annual council meeting on 25 May 2023 the new Conservative leader, 22-year-old Dan Swords, was appointed leader of the council.

== Summary ==
=== Election result ===
2023 Harlow District Council election
Party	This election				Full council			This election		
Party	Candidates	Seats	Net	Seats %	Other	Total	Total %	Votes	Votes %	+/−
Conservative	{{{candidates}}}	5	▲1	45.5	16	21	63.6	6,675	41.5	–6.6
Labour	{{{candidates}}}	6	▼1	54.5	6	12	36.4	7,041	43.8	+3.7
Green	{{{candidates}}}	0	Steady	0.0	0	0	0.0	1,524	9.5	+0.5
Harlow Alliance	{{{candidates}}}	0	Steady	0.0	0	0	0.0	455	2.8	+0.5
Liberal Democrats	{{{candidates}}}	0	Steady	0.0	0	0	0.0	235	1.5	+1.3
Reform	{{{candidates}}}	0	Steady	0.0	0	0	0.0	111	0.7	N/A
TUSC	{{{candidates}}}	0	Steady	0.0	0	0	0.0	42	0.3	+0.1

== Ward results ==
The Statement of Persons Nominated, which details the candidates standing in each ward, was released by Harlow District Council following the close of nomination on 5 April 2023. The results were:

=== Bush Fair ===
Bush Fair
Party	Candidate	Votes	%	±%
Labour Co-op	Jodi Dunne*	687	50.9	+6.7
Conservative	Emma Ghaffari	450	33.3	–11.3
Green	Jennifer Steadman	142	10.5	+2.9
Liberal Democrats	Christopher Millington	63	4.7	+1.6
Majority		237	17.6	N/A
Turnout		1,350	24.7	–2.9
Registered electors		5,469		
Labour Co-op hold		Swing	▲9.0	

=== Church Langley ===
Church Langley
Party	Candidate	Votes	%	±%
Conservative	Andrew Johnson*	1,000	64.1	–5.3
Labour	Michael Danvers	402	25.8	+4.9
Green	Bengeman White	154	9.9	+0.4
Majority		598	38.3	–10.4
Turnout		1,561	24.5	–3.2
Registered electors		6,378		
Conservative hold		Swing	▼5.1	

=== Great Parndon ===
Great Parndon
Party	Candidate	Votes	%	±%
Conservative	David Carter*	749	51.9	–0.2
Labour	John Strachan	441	30.6	+0.8
Harlow Alliance	Nicholas Taylor	173	12.0	–5.9
Green	Paul King	77	5.3	N/A
Majority		308	21.4	–1.0
Turnout		1,442	29.8	–4.3
Registered electors		4,837		
Conservative hold		Swing	▼0.5	

=== Harlow Common ===
Harlow Common
Party	Candidate	Votes	%	±%
Labour	Mark Wilkinson*	707	46.9	+2.1
Conservative	Danielle Brown	645	42.8	–5.1
Green	Nathan Ederton	149	9.9	+2.9
Majority		62	4.1	N/A
Turnout		1,507	27.8	–3.0
Registered electors		5,429		
Labour hold		Swing	▲3.6	

=== Little Parndon and Hare Street ===
Little Parndon and Hare Street
Party	Candidate	Votes	%	±%
Labour	Margaret Hulcoop	988	65.2	+14.3
Conservative	Jayne Saunders	450	29.7	–8.3
Green	Klara Bow	66	4.4	–5.9
Majority		538	35.5	+22.3
Turnout		1,516	23.6	–4.2
Registered electors		6,415		
Labour hold		Swing	▲11.3	

=== Mark Hall ===
Mark Hall
Party	Candidate	Votes	%	±%
Labour	Aiden O'Dell	626	47.4	+4.3
Conservative	Geoffrey Longster	320	24.2	–16.5
Green	Jamie Gilbert	176	13.3	–2.5
Reform	Mark Gough	111	8.4	N/A
Liberal Democrats	Lesley Rideout	82	6.2	N/A
Majority		306	23.2	+20.7
Turnout		1,320	24.8	–4.6
Registered electors		5,332		
Labour hold		Swing	▲10.4	

=== Netteswell ===
Netteswell
Party	Candidate	Votes	%	±%
Labour	Nancy Watson*	705	52.0	+2.3
Conservative	Elena Hardware	452	33.3	–6.0
Green	Kim O'Connor	103	7.6	–3.0
Liberal Democrats	Robert Thurston	90	6.7	N/A
Majority		253	18.6	+8.2
Turnout		1,357	22.8	–4.9
Registered electors		5,944		
Labour hold		Swing	▲4.2	

=== Old Harlow ===
Old Harlow
Party	Candidate	Votes	%	±%
Conservative	Sue Livings*	1,073	48.7	–3.8
Labour	Stefan Mullard	747	33.9	+5.1
Green	Yasmin Gregory	325	14.7	–1.1
TUSC	Paul Lenihan	42	1.9	±0.0
Majority		326	14.8	–8.7
Turnout		2,204	25.5	–3.8
Registered electors		8,652		
Conservative hold		Swing	▼4.5	

=== Staple Tye ===
Staple Tye
Party	Candidate	Votes	%	±%
Conservative	John Steer	504	42.7	–9.6
Labour Co-op	Jake Shepherd	476	40.4	+1.4
Harlow Alliance	Karen James	105	8.9	N/A
Green	Gareth Williams	90	7.6	–0.7
Majority		28	2.4	–11.0
Turnout		1,179	23.1	–3.6
Registered electors		5,096		
Conservative gain from Labour		Swing	▼5.5	

=== Sumners & Kingsmoor ===
Sumners & Kingsmoor
Party	Candidate	Votes	%	±%
Conservative	Clive Souter*	574	43.5	–8.1
Labour	Anita Schultschik	481	36.4	+4.4
Harlow Alliance	Alan Leverett	177	13.4	+2.3
Green	David Margetts	86	6.5	+1.4
Majority		93	7.0	–12.6
Turnout		1,321	26.2	–3.0
Registered electors		5,049		
Conservative hold		Swing	▼6.3	

=== Toddbrook ===
Toddbrook
Party	Candidate	Votes	%	±%
Labour	Daniella Pritchard	781	56.0	+7.9
Conservative	Brian Kasule	458	32.8	–6.9
Green	Julie Taylor	156	11.2	–1.0
Majority		323	23.0	N/A
Turnout		1,402	25.2	–3.9
Registered electors		5,557		
Labour hold		Swing	▲7.4	

== Reactions ==
The Conservative leader of the council, Russell Perrin, said the election was a "brilliant result" for the party. Robert Halfon, the Conservative MP for Harlow, thanked voters and noted that the gain from Labour in Staple Tye resulted in the ward having all Conservative councillors for the first time.

The leader of the Labour group on the council, Chris Vince, called the election a "good result for Harlow Labour", pointing to the party winning the popular vote and the majority of seats up for election.
