= 2023 Hertsmere Borough Council election =

- 4 May 2023

All 39 seats to Hertsmere Borough Council 20 seats needed for a majority

	First party	Second party	Third party
Leader	Morris Bright	Jeremy Newmark	Paul Richards
Party	Conservative	Labour	Liberal Democrats
Last election	29 seats, 54.3%	7 seats, 28.3%	3 seats, 11.6%
Seats won	16	14	9
Seat change	▼13	▲7	▲6
Popular vote	26,435	20,218	13,286
Percentage	43.1%	32.9%	21.6%
Swing	▼11.2%	▲4.6%	▲10.0%
- Winner of each seat at the 2023 Hertsmere Borough Council election
Leader before election
Morris Bright
Conservative
Leader after election
Jeremy Newmark
Labour
No overall control

The 2023 Hertsmere Borough Council election took place on 4 May 2023 to elect members of Hertsmere Borough Council in Hertfordshire, England. This was on the same day as other local elections across England.

The council went under no overall control at this election, with the Conservatives losing the majority they had held since 1999. Whilst the Conservatives were still the largest party on the council, a Labour and Liberal Democrat coalition formed to take control of the council instead. Labour group leader Jeremy Newmark became leader of the council and Liberal Democrat group leader Paul Richards became deputy leader of the council.

== Summary ==
=== Election result ===
2023 Hertsmere Borough Council election
Party	Candidates	Seats	Gains	Losses	Net gain/loss	Seats %	Votes %	Votes	+/−
Conservative	39	16	0	13	▼13	41.0	43.1	26,435	–11.2
Labour	39	14	7	0	▲7	35.9	32.9	20,218	+4.6
Liberal Democrats	25	9	6	0	▲6	23.1	21.6	13,286	+10.0
Green	8	0	0	0	Steady	0.0	1.6	997	N/A
Independent	1	0	0	0	Steady	0.0	0.5	317	–3.8
Reform	2	0	0	0	Steady	0.0	0.2	130	N/A

== Ward results ==
The Statement of Persons Nominated, which details the candidates standing in each ward, was released by Hertsmere Borough Council following the close of nominations on 5 April 2023.

=== Aldenham East ===
Aldenham East (2 seats)
Party	Candidate	Votes	%	±%
Conservative	Lucy Selby	967	66.9	–4.1
Conservative	Brett Rosehill	853	59.0	–9.5
Liberal Democrats	Ben Denton-Cardew	311	21.5	+8.3
Liberal Democrats	Stuart Howard	300	20.8	N/A
Labour	Joshua Goldman	179	12.4	+2.0
Labour	Julian Treves Brown	167	11.6	+2.3
Turnout		1,445	37.4	–2.9
Registered electors		3,864		
Conservative hold				
Conservative hold				

=== Aldenham West ===
Aldenham West (2 seats)
Party	Candidate	Votes	%	±%
Conservative	Caroline Clapper	882	56.4	–21.9
Conservative	David Lambert	752	48.1	–18.0
Labour	Sandra Huff	200	12.8	–0.9
Liberal Democrats	Jon May	186	11.9	–3.5
Liberal Democrats	Saif al-Saadoon	164	10.5	N/A
Labour	Ronan Dhadra	161	10.3	–2.2
Turnout		1,564	39.0	+5.8
Registered electors		4,009		
Conservative hold				
Conservative hold				

=== Bentley Heath & the Royds ===
Bentley Heath & the Royds (2 seats)
Party	Candidate	Votes	%	±%
Labour Co-op	Helen Green	741	47.4	+16.1
Conservative	Meenal Sachdev	740	47.3	–16.6
Labour Co-op	John Doolan	712	45.5	+17.3
Conservative	Panna Shah	705	45.1	–18.3
Green	Frank Jeffs	191	12.2	N/A
Turnout		1,647	37.1	+6.9
Registered electors		4,440		
Labour Co-op gain from Conservative				
Conservative hold				

=== Borehamwood Brookmeadow ===
Borehamwood Brookmeadow (3 seats)
Party	Candidate	Votes	%	±%
Labour Co-op	Rebecca Challice	942	48.0	+12.6
Labour Co-op	Graeme Alexander	935	47.6	+13.7
Conservative	Alan Plancey	878	44.7	+3.5
Labour Co-op	Caroline Pitrakou	854	43.5	+11.6
Conservative	Glenn Briski	807	41.1	+4.7
Conservative	Shivani Sachdev	733	37.3	–4.0
Liberal Democrats	Irena Slack	218	11.1	N/A
Turnout		1,963	30.5	–2.6
Registered electors		6,435		
Labour Co-op gain from Conservative				
Labour Co-op gain from Conservative				
Conservative hold				

=== Borehamwood Cowley Hill ===
Borehamwood Cowley Hill (3 seats)
Party	Candidate	Votes	%	±%
Labour Co-op	Richard Butler	1,000	64.4	+8.4
Labour Co-op	Jeremy Newmark	928	59.7	+13.0
Labour	Linda Smith	875	56.3	+1.1
Conservative	Jake Landsberg	376	24.2	–2.4
Conservative	Daniel Nygate	360	23.2	–2.8
Conservative	Romy Rosehill	356	22.9	–2.0
Green	Naomi Coleman	193	12.4	N/A
Liberal Democrats	Paulo Goncalves	146	9.4	N/A
Turnout		1,554	24.2	–2.2
Registered electors		6,421		
Labour Co-op hold				
Labour Co-op hold				
Labour hold				

=== Borehamwood Hillside ===
Borehamwood Hillside (3 seats)
Party	Candidate	Votes	%	±%
Labour	Alpha Collins	847	47.1	+24.0
Labour	Aaditya Kaza	770	42.8	+20.4
Conservative	Alexander Clarkson	765	42.6	+4.9
Conservative	Victor Eni*	747	41.6	+1.5
Conservative	Farida Turner*	732	40.7	+0.7
Labour	Tushar Kumar	725	40.3	+18.0
Green	Madalyn Bielfield	230	12.8	N/A
Liberal Democrats	Richard Goorney	184	10.2	–7.8
Turnout		1,797	31.9	–0.2
Registered electors		5,634		
Labour gain from Conservative				
Labour gain from Conservative				
Conservative hold				

=== Borehamwood Kenilworth ===
Borehamwood Kenilworth (3 seats)
Party	Candidate	Votes	%	±%
Labour Co-op	Nik Oakley	1,074	59.1	+5.0
Labour Co-op	Prabhakar Kaza	1,056	58.1	+13.2
Labour Co-op	Parveen Rani	1,014	55.8	+10.9
Conservative	Emma Green	565	31.1	–13.9
Conservative	Susan Glyn	543	29.9	–10.5
Conservative	David Lazarus	533	29.4	–10.3
Liberal Democrats	Elaine Elliman	241	13.3	N/A
Turnout		1,816	27.7	
Registered electors		6,554		
Labour Co-op hold				
Labour Co-op gain from Conservative				
Labour Co-op hold				

=== Bushey Heath ===
Bushey Heath (2 seats)
Party	Candidate	Votes	%	±%
Conservative	Paul Morris*	818	64.0	–9.7
Conservative	Seamus Quilty*	767	60.0	–12.7
Liberal Democrats	Ollie Kay	368	28.8	+13.5
Liberal Democrats	Roger Kutchinsky	341	26.7	+12.5
Labour	David Lee	94	7.4	–1.7
Labour	Pooja Nirmal	94	7.4	+0.7
Turnout		1,278	35.0	+1.9
Registered electors		3,650		
Conservative hold				
Conservative hold				

=== Bushey North ===
Bushey North (3 seats)
Party	Candidate	Votes	%	±%
Liberal Democrats	Louise Nicolas*	1,219	61.8	+19.3
Liberal Democrats	Alan Matthews*	1,169	59.3	+16.8
Liberal Democrats	Paul Richards*	1,139	57.8	+18.8
Conservative	Jacob Jefferson	508	25.8	–8.3
Conservative	Nish Patel	450	22.8	–10.9
Conservative	Fenton Gee	437	22.2	–5.1
Labour	Elodie Mayo	249	12.6	–5.9
Labour	Judith Maizels	248	12.6	–2.9
Labour	Philip Reardon	215	10.9	–4.2
Turnout		1,971	32.9	+2.4
Registered electors		5,990		
Liberal Democrats hold				
Liberal Democrats hold				
Liberal Democrats hold				

=== Bushey Park ===
Bushey Park (3 seats)
Party	Candidate	Votes	%	±%
Liberal Democrats	Maxie Allen	1,225	52.5	+35.6
Liberal Democrats	Marc Amron	1,184	50.7	+35.4
Liberal Democrats	Shailain Shah	1,068	45.8	+30.8
Conservative	Linda Silver*	925	39.6	–24.5
Conservative	David Carter	873	37.4	–26.2
Conservative	Anne Swerling*	840	36.0	–23.5
Labour	Freda Guilfoyle	188	8.1	–7.9
Labour	Di Hoeksma	155	6.6	–8.2
Labour	Habib Khan	140	6.0	–6.6
Turnout		2,334	40.3	+5.3
Registered electors		5,792		
Liberal Democrats gain from Conservative				
Liberal Democrats gain from Conservative				
Liberal Democrats gain from Conservative				

=== Bushey St James ===
Bushey St James (3 seats)
Party	Candidate	Votes	%	±%
Liberal Democrats	Mia Handley	1,109	56.4	+30.9
Liberal Democrats	Miles Ponder	1,046	53.2	+31.3
Liberal Democrats	Christopher Shenton	982	49.9	+28.3
Conservative	Pervez Choudhury*	657	33.4	–21.4
Conservative	Peter Rutledge*	625	31.8	–23.8
Conservative	Jane West	621	31.6	–22.0
Labour	Peter Halsey	214	10.9	–11.1
Labour	Mary Reid	197	10.0	–10.5
Labour	Yvonne Riley	193	9.8	–10.0
Turnout		1,968	35.8	–3.6
Registered electors		5,498		
Liberal Democrats gain from Conservative				
Liberal Democrats gain from Conservative				
Liberal Democrats gain from Conservative				

=== Elstree ===
Elstree (2 seats)
Party	Candidate	Votes	%	±%
Conservative	Harvey Cohen*	845	69.4	–2.5
Conservative	Morris Bright*	832	68.4	–1.4
Labour	Jonathan Metzer	278	22.8	+7.6
Labour	Satvinder Juss	255	21.0	+6.4
Liberal Democrats	Theresa Smith	106	8.7	N/A
Liberal Democrats	Igor Novokreshchenov	84	6.9	N/A
Turnout		1,217	32.9	–2.6
Registered electors		3,700		
Conservative hold				
Conservative hold				

=== Potters Bar Furzefield ===
Potters Bar Furzefield (2 seats)
Party	Candidate	Votes	%	±%
Labour Co-op	Chris Gray*	831	56.1	+10.7
Labour Co-op	Chris Meyers*	816	55.1	+11.8
Conservative	Amit Dodhia	495	33.4	–7.0
Conservative	Amit Dodhia	462	31.2	–6.6
Liberal Democrats	Nick Jankunas	94	6.4	N/A
Reform	Simon Rhodes	77	5.2	N/A
Turnout		1,480	34.8	+2.6
Registered electors		4,253		
Labour Co-op hold				
Labour Co-op hold				

=== Potters Bar Oakmere ===
Potters Bar Oakmere (2 seats)
Party	Candidate	Votes	%	±%
Conservative	Sarah Hodgson-Jones	651	47.3	–8.7
Labour Co-op	Renos Georgiou	624	45.3	+6.6
Labour Co-op	Ann Harrison	612	44.4	+6.5
Conservative	Ruth Lyon*	606	44.0	–10.3
Green	Joan Collins	94	6.8	N/A
Turnout		1,377	32.0	+4.0
Registered electors		4,302		
Conservative hold				
Labour Co-op gain from Conservative				

=== Potters Bar Parkfield ===
Potters Bar Parkfield (2 seats)
Party	Candidate	Votes	%	±%
Conservative	Lynette Sullivan	799	56.8	+2.2
Conservative	Abhishek Sachdev*	746	53.0	+3.5
Labour Co-op	Susan Ballard	435	30.9	+17.1
Labour Co-op	Hannah Doolan	392	27.9	+15.7
Liberal Democrats	Roy Bridgen	164	11.7	–20.7
Green	David Lister	142	10.1	N/A
Turnout		1,407	37.5	+0.8
Registered electors		3,751		
Conservative hold				
Conservative hold				

=== Shenley ===
Shenley (2 seats)
Party	Candidate	Votes	%	±%
Conservative	Natalie Susman*	604	41.6	–14.4
Conservative	Paul Hodgson-Jones	577	39.7	–15.5
Labour	Jonathan Shaw	430	29.6	+12.4
Labour	Alexander Davies	377	25.9	+13.3
Independent	Rosemary Gilligan	317	21.8	–16.0
Liberal Democrats	Holly Gunning	154	10.6	N/A
Green	John Humphries	147	10.1	N/A
Liberal Democrats	David Lewis	84	5.8	N/A
Reform	Darren Selkus	53	3.6	N/A
Turnout		1,453	36.1	+0.3
Registered electors		4,025		
Conservative hold				
Conservative hold				

== By-elections ==
=== Borehamwood Brookmeadow ===
Borehamwood Brookmeadow by-election: 24 July 2025
Party	Candidate	Votes	%	±%
Conservative	Glenn Briski	478	29.6	–13.5
Reform	Gus Channer	394	24.4	N/A
Independent	Michelle Vince	339	21.0	N/A
Labour	Bala Mere	295	18.3	–27.9
Liberal Democrats	Rosalind Levine	47	2.9	–7.8
Green	Madalyn Bielfeld	37	2.3	N/A
Independent	Lawrence Stack	26	1.6	N/A
Majority		84	5.2	N/A
Turnout		1,616	24.8	–5.7
Conservative hold				

=== Bentley Heath & the Royds ===
Bentley Heath & the Royds by-election: 7 May 2026
Party	Candidate	Votes	%	±%
Conservative	John Graham	700	33.4	−13.9
Reform	Simon Rhodes	607	29.0	N/A
Labour	Lisa Worrell	491	23.4	−24.0
Green	John Humphries	205	9.8	−2.4
Liberal Democrats	Therese Smith	93	4.4	N/A
Turnout		2,100	47.5	
Rejected ballots		4		
Registered electors		4,420		
Conservative hold				
