= 2023 Knowsley Metropolitan Borough Council election =

2023 local election in England

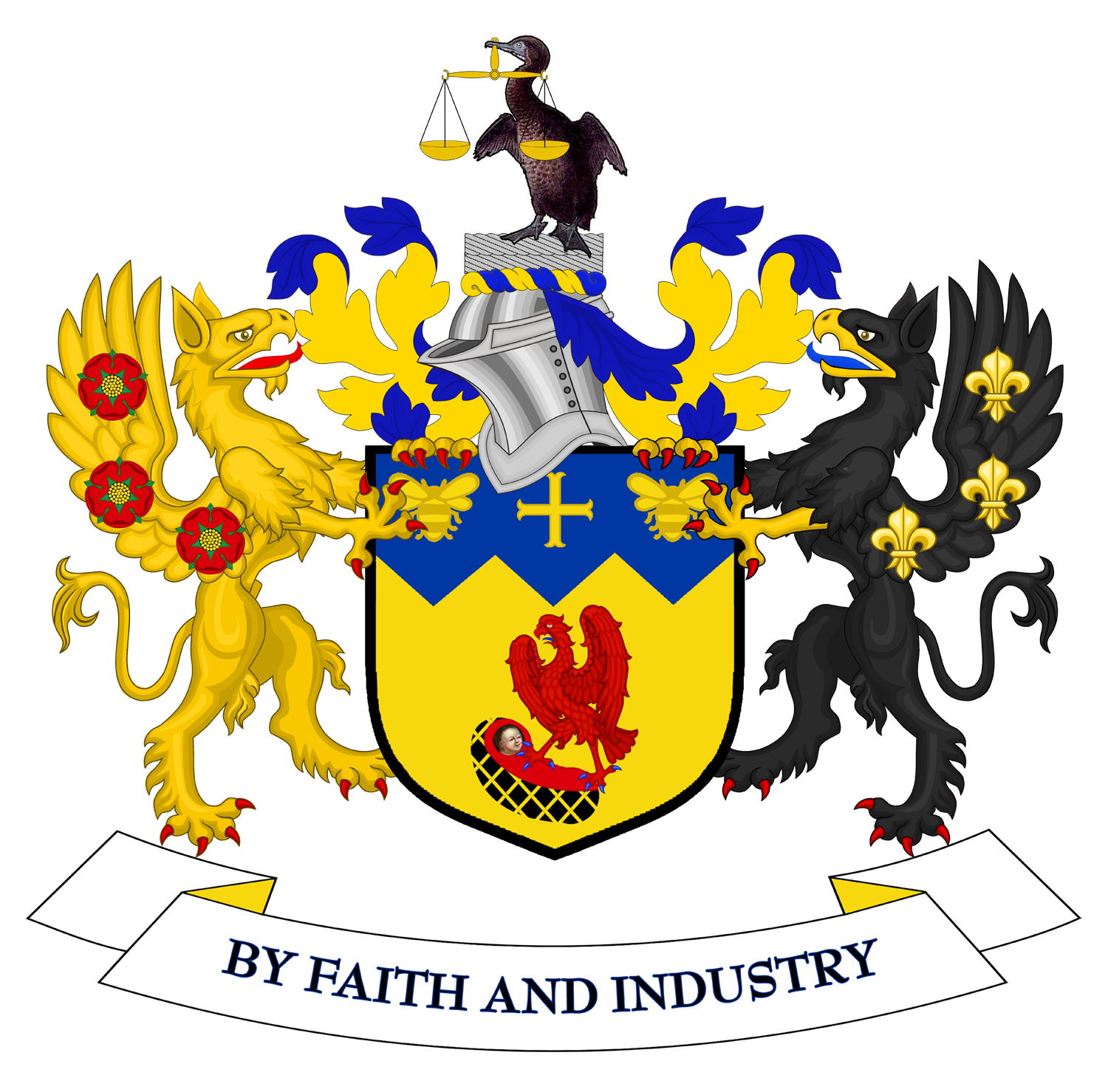
- 4 May 2023

16 out of 45 seats to Knowsley Metropolitan Borough Council 23 seats needed for a majority

	First party	Second party
Leader	Graham Morgan	Kai Taylor
Party	Labour	Green
Last election	32 seats, 59.2%	6 seats, 20.9%
Seats before	32	5
Seats won	9	4
Seats after	31	7
Seat change	▼1	▲2
Popular vote	17,236	6,786
Percentage	59.0%	23.2%
Swing	▼0.2%	▲2.3%
	Third party	Fourth party
Party	Independent	Liberal Democrats
Last election	4 seats, 12.3%	3 seats, 4.3%
Seats before	5	2
Seats won	1	2
Seats after	4	3
Seat change	▼1	Steady
Popular vote	2,315	2,182
Percentage	7.9%	7.5%
Swing	▼4.4%	▲3.2%
- Winner of each seat at the 2023 Knowsley Metropolitan Borough Council election
Leader before election
Graham Morgan
Labour
Leader after election
Graham Morgan
Labour

The 2023 Knowsley Metropolitan Borough Council election took place on 4 May 2023 to elect members of Knowsley Metropolitan Borough Council in Merseyside, England. This was on the same day as other local elections. Labour retained its majority on the council.

The Green Party made two further gains from Labour to secure their status as the official opposition in the borough. Paul Woodruff took the seat from Labour’s Hugh Malone in Roby ward and Graham Golding secured a second gain for the Greens in St Gabriel’s ward. The Green Party also held their council seats in Whiston and Cronton ward and the Prescot South ward. The only other change was in Whitefield ward, with Labour’s Gary Bennett regaining the Kirkby seat from John Morgan, who had resigned from the Labour Party to sit as an independent.

== Election result ==
2023 Knowsley Metropolitan Borough Council election
Party	This election				Full council			This election		
Party	Candidates	Seats	Net	Seats %	Other	Total	Total %	Votes	Votes %	+/−
Labour	{{{candidates}}}	9	▼1	56.3	22	31	68.9	17,236	59.0	–0.2
Green	{{{candidates}}}	4	▲2	25.0	3	7	15.6	6,786	23.2	+2.3
Independent	{{{candidates}}}	1	▼1	6.3	3	4	8.9	2,315	7.9	–4.4
Liberal Democrats	{{{candidates}}}	2	Steady	12.5	1	3	6.7	2,182	7.5	+3.2
Conservative	{{{candidates}}}	0	Steady	0.0	0	0	0.0	454	1.6	-+0.3
TUSC	{{{candidates}}}	0	Steady	0.0	0	0	0.0	151	0.5	–1.4
Freedom Alliance	{{{candidates}}}	0	Steady	0.0	0	0	0.0	45	0.2	N/A
SDP	{{{candidates}}}	0	Steady	0.0	0	0	0.0	26	0.1	N/A

== Ward results ==
Vote totals and turnout figures for each ward were published by Knowsley Council in its election results archive and in a combined results document.

=== Cherryfield ===
Cherryfield
Party	Candidate	Votes	%	±%
Labour	Jayne Aston*	1,138	74.1	+3.1
Green	Ryan Riley	246	16.0	−8.5
TUSC	Neill Dunne	151	9.8	N/A
Majority		892	58.1	
Turnout		1,535	19.1	
Labour hold		Swing	▲5.8	

=== Halewood North ===
Halewood North
Party	Candidate	Votes	%	±%
Labour	Shelley Powell*	1,352	68.6	+14.2
Independent	Suzanne Harvey	464	23.5	−15.7
Conservative	David Jones	156	7.9	+1.5
Majority		888	45.0	
Turnout		1,972	24.1	
Labour hold		Swing	▲14.9	

=== Halewood South ===
Halewood South
Party	Candidate	Votes	%	±%
Independent	Barbara Dunn*	935	48.7	▼5.2
Labour	Clare Rose	892	46.4	N/A
Conservative	Paul Letts	94	4.9	N/A
Majority		43	2.2	
Turnout		1,921	23.7	
Independent hold		Swing	N/A	

=== Northwood ===
Northwood
Party	Candidate	Votes	%	±%
Labour	Marie Stuart*	1,219	82.5	+6.5
Green	Matthew Kirwan	259	17.5	−2.0
Majority		960	65.0	
Turnout		1,478	16.7	
Labour hold		Swing	▲4.2	

=== Page Moss ===
Page Moss
Party	Candidate	Votes	%	±%
Labour	Del Arnall*	1,060	66.7	−2.5
Green	John Carine	530	33.3	+7.6
Majority		530	33.3	
Turnout		1,590	18.2	
Labour hold		Swing	▼5.0	

=== Prescot North ===
Prescot North (2 seats due to by-election)
Party	Candidate	Votes	%	±%
Liberal Democrats	Mark Burke	1,128	53.7	−6.2
Liberal Democrats	Ian Smith*	1,054	50.1	−9.8
Labour	Tommy Grierson	1,008	47.9	+13.2
Labour	Gary See	898	42.7	+8.0
Conservative	Peter Leadbeater	117	5.6	+0.2
Turnout			25.3	
Liberal Democrats hold		Swing	▲1.8	
Liberal Democrats hold		Swing	▲1.8	

The additional Prescot North vacancy was the seat formerly held by Carl Cashman, who moved to Liverpool and was elected to Liverpool City Council for Church ward on the same day.

=== Prescot South ===
Prescot South
Party	Candidate	Votes	%	±%
Green	Joanne Burke*	1,296	69.1	+1.4
Labour	Robert Owens	580	30.9	+1.7
Majority		716	38.2	
Turnout			25.4	
Green hold		Swing	▼0.2	

=== Roby ===
Roby
Party	Candidate	Votes	%	±%
Green	Paul Woodruff	1,280	49.0	+5.5
Labour	Hugh Malone*	1,246	47.7	−0.2
Conservative	Aaron Waters	87	3.3	−5.2
Majority		34	1.3	
Turnout		2,613	33.8	
Green gain from Labour		Swing	▲2.9	

=== Shevington ===
Shevington
Party	Candidate	Votes	%	±%
Labour	Tony Brennan*	1,242	86.1	+8.9
Green	Russell Greenway	201	13.9	N/A
Majority		1,041	72.1	
Turnout		1,443	17.9	
Labour hold				

=== St Gabriels ===
St Gabriels
Party	Candidate	Votes	%	±%
Green	Graham Golding	1,032	54.8	N/A
Labour	Jo Schumacher	825	43.8	N/A
SDP	Patricia Jameson	26	1.4	N/A
Majority		207	11.0	
Turnout		1,883	25.9	
Green gain from Labour		Swing	N/A	

=== St Michaels ===
St Michaels
Party	Candidate	Votes	%	±%
Labour	Mike Kearns*	1,164	78.2	+2.1
Green	James Taylor	324	21.8	N/A
Majority		840	56.5	
Turnout		1,488	21.0	
Labour hold		Swing	N/A	

=== Stockbridge ===
Stockbridge
Party	Candidate	Votes	%	±%
Labour	John Donnelly*	1,047	79.6	+5.1
Green	Paul Ryan	269	20.4	+0.2
Majority		778	59.1	
Turnout		1,316	15.6	
Labour hold		Swing	▲2.4	

=== Swanside ===
Swanside
Party	Candidate	Votes	%	±%
Labour	Chris Bannon*	1,606	81.2	+24.3
Green	Graham Wickens	373	18.8	−20.5
Majority		1,233	62.3	
Turnout		1,979	26.1	
Labour hold		Swing	▲22.4	

=== Whiston and Cronton ===
Whiston and Cronton
Party	Candidate	Votes	%	±%
Green	Ron Gaffney*	976	52.1	+0.5
Labour	Diane Sedman	897	47.9	+6.7
Majority		79	4.2	
Turnout		1,873	25.2	
Green hold		Swing	▼3.1	

=== Whitefield ===
Whitefield
Party	Candidate	Votes	%	±%
Labour	Gary Bennett	1,062	52.5	−32.9
Independent	John Morgan*	916	45.3	▼40.1
Freedom Alliance	Christine Dillon	45	2.2	N/A
Majority		146	7.2	
Turnout		2,023	25.3	
Labour gain from Independent		Swing	N/A	

== Changes 2023–2024 ==
=== By-elections ===
==== Whitefield ====
Whitefield by-election, 21 March 2024
Party	Candidate	Votes	%	±%
Independent	Brian Johns	659	54.1	+8.8
Labour	Robert Adrian Owens	558	45.9	−6.6
Majority		101	8.3	
Turnout		1217	22.8	
Independent hold		Swing	N/A	

The Whitefield by-election was triggered by the disqualification of independent councillor Steve Guy after he failed to attend council meetings for six months.
