= 2023 United Kingdom local elections =

- 4 May 2023 (England); 18 May 2023 (Northern Ireland)

230 of 369 councils in England 4 directly elected mayors in England All 11 councils in Northern Ireland
- Turnout: 32.0% (England); 54.7% (Northern Ireland)
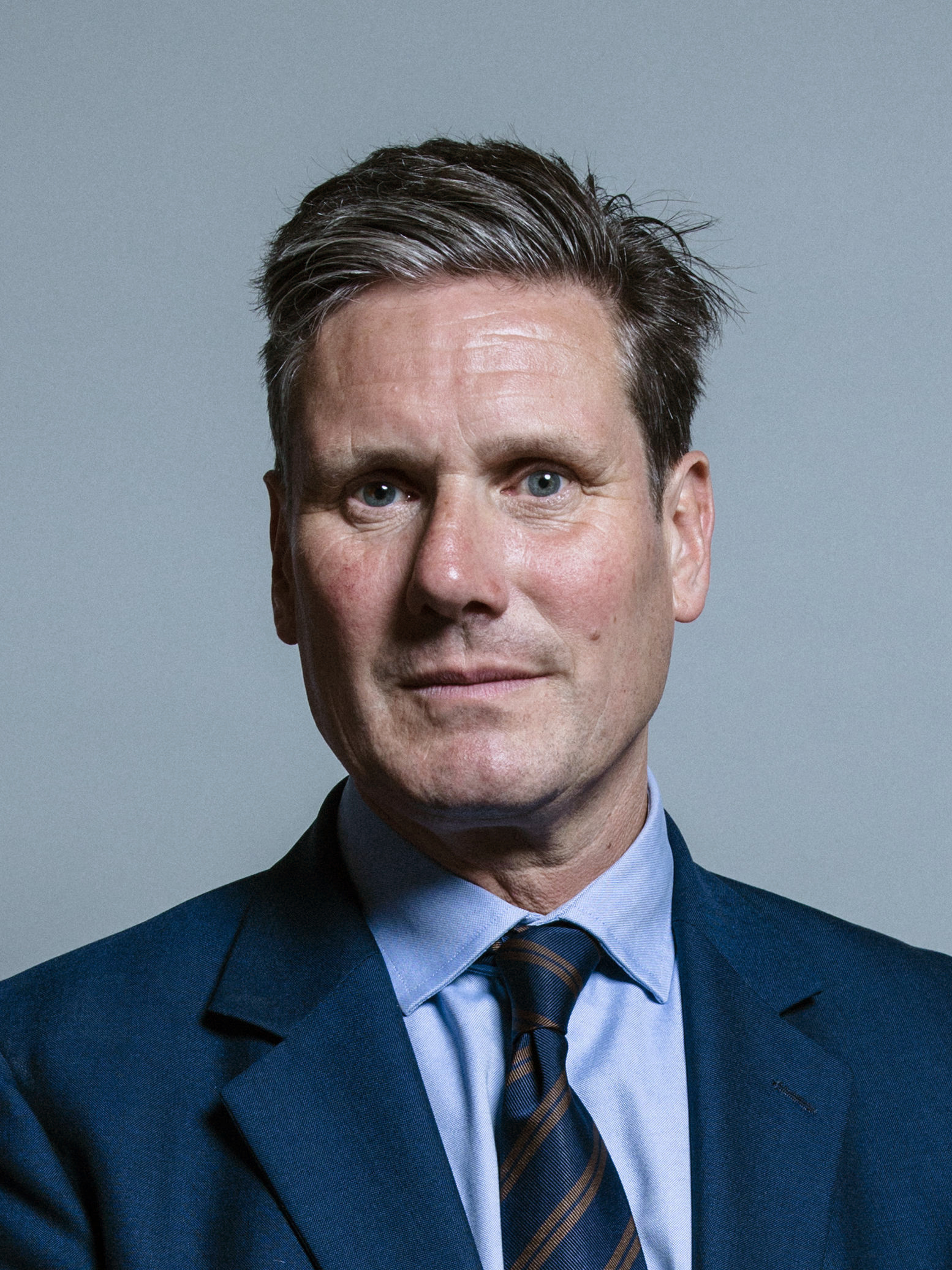

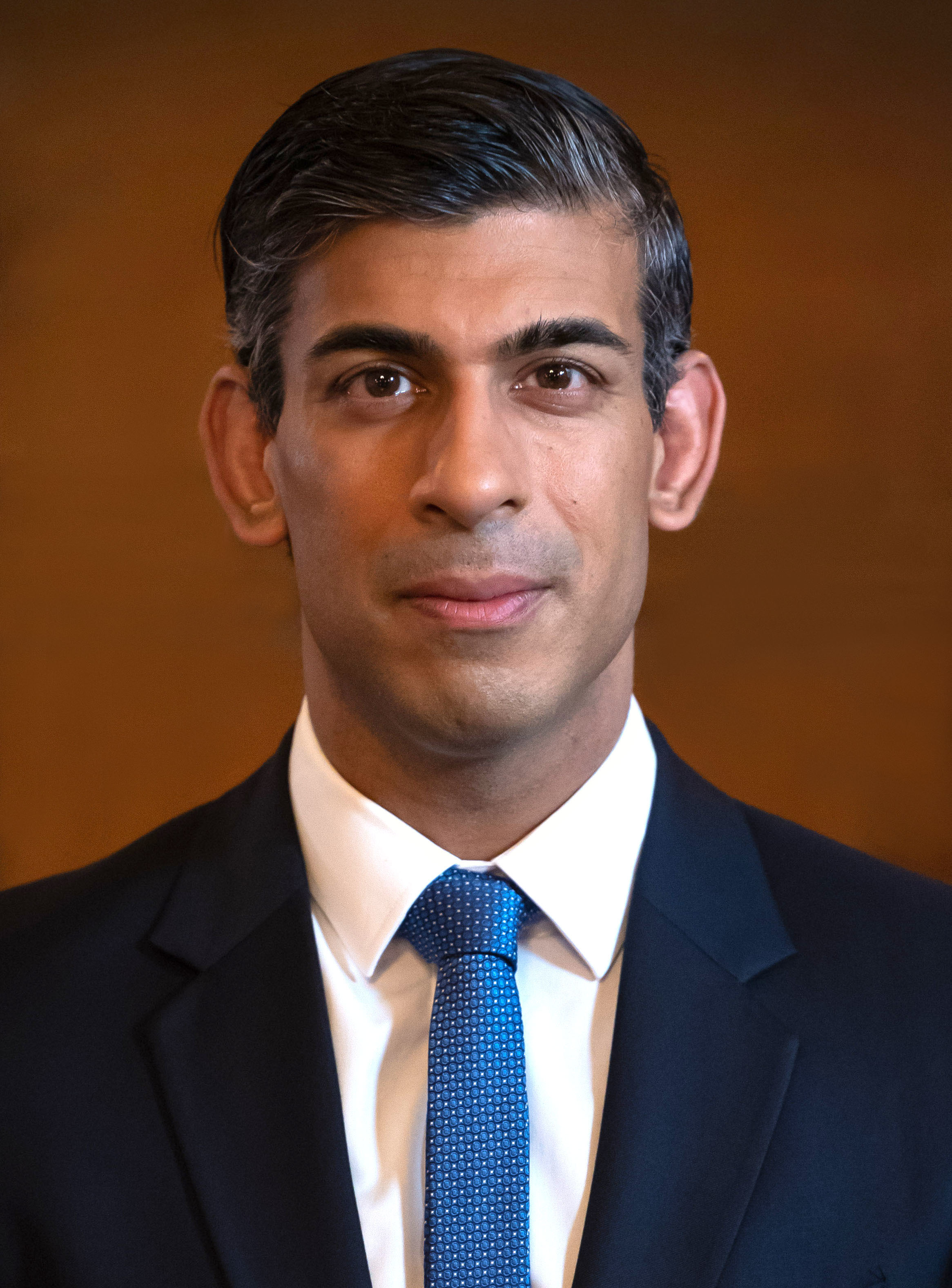

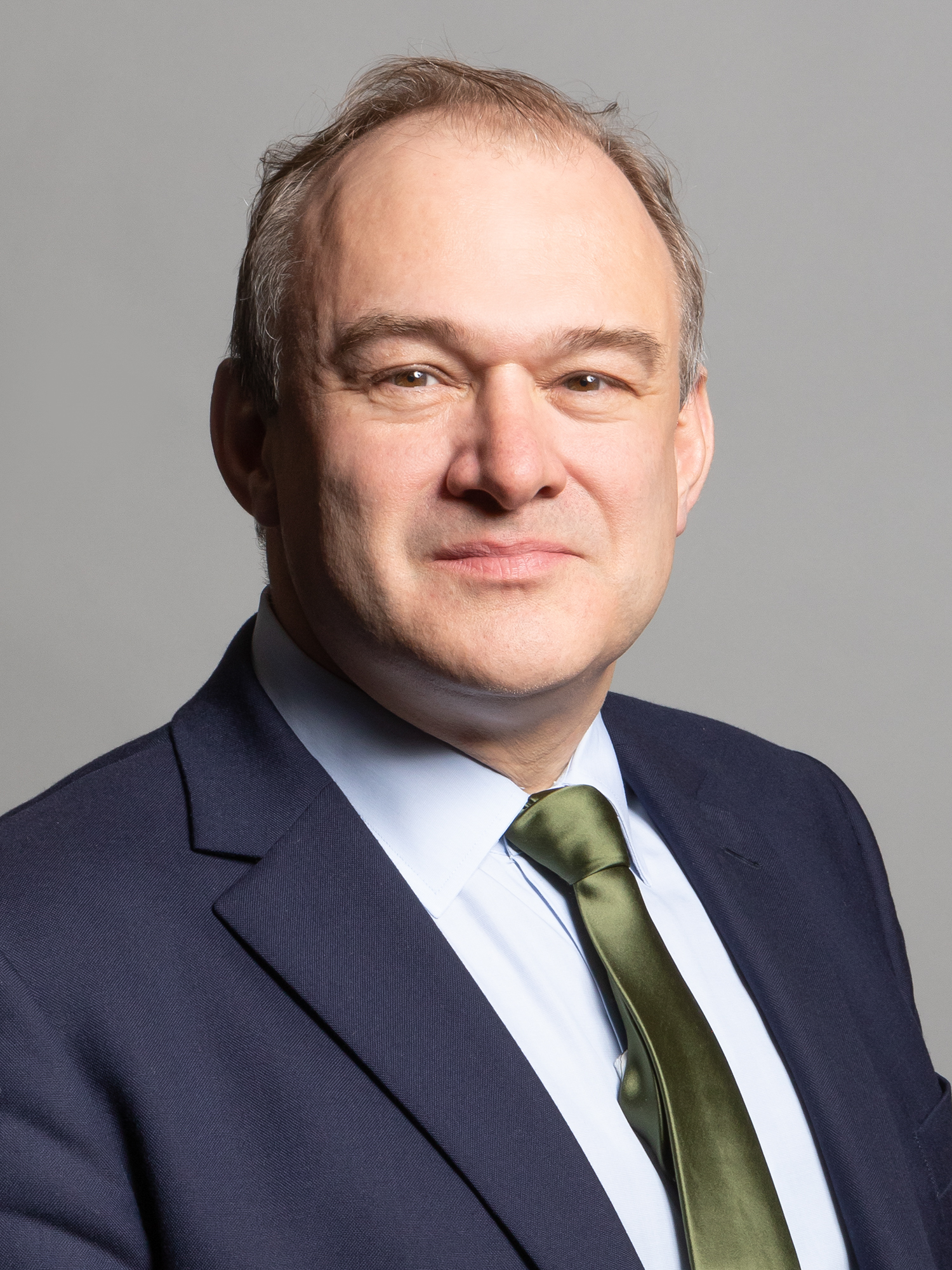

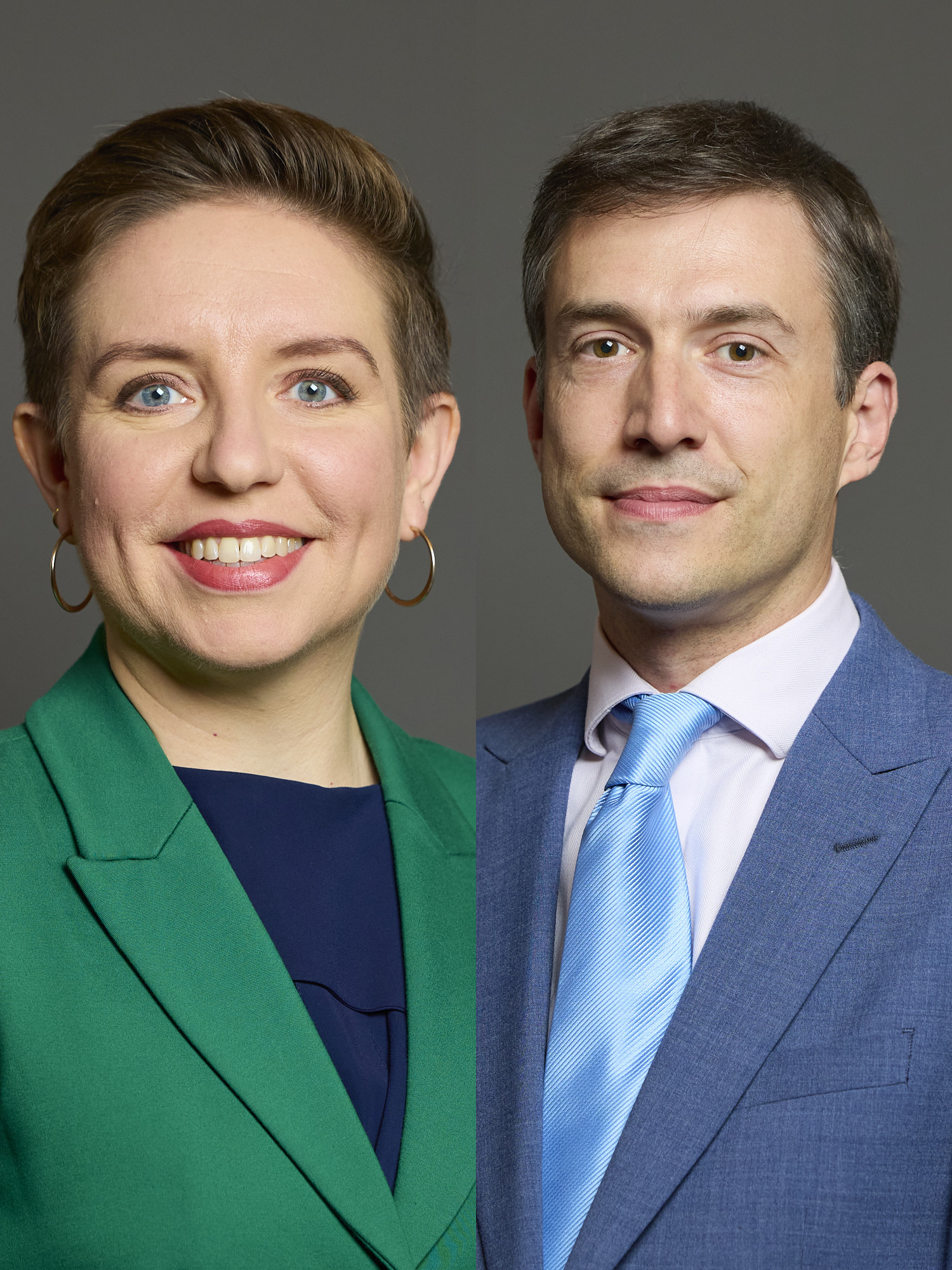
| | First party | Second party |
|---|---|---|
| Leader | Keir Starmer | Rishi Sunak |
| Party | Labour | Conservative |
| Leader since | 4 April 2020 | 24 October 2022 |
| Seats before | 5,982 seats 86 councils | 6,823 seats 118 councils |
| Projected vote share (Note: All vote shares are projected national vote shares calculated by the BBC.) | 35% | 26% ▼4% |
| Seats won (2023) | 2,675; 71 councils | 2,296; 33 councils |
| Councillors (after) | 6,507; 108 councils | 5,702; 70 councils |
| Net change (notional) | ▲537 ▲22 councils | ▼1,063 ▼48 councils |
| | Third party | Fourth party |
| Leader | Ed Davey | Carla Denyer & Adrian Ramsay |
| Party | Liberal Democrats | Green (E&W) |
| Leader since | 27 August 2020 | 1 October 2021 |
| Seats before | 2,605 seats 25 councils | 556 seats 0 councils |
| Projected vote share | 20% ▲1% | 12% ▲1% |
| Seats won (2023) | 1,628; 37 councils | 481; 1 council |
| Councillors (after) | | 789; 1 council |
| Net change (notional) | ▲407 ▲12 councils | ▲241 ▲1 council |
- Map showing party control of councils following the elections.: No election; otherwise see analysis table

Local authorities with elections: Metropolitan borough; Unitary authority; District councils in England; District councils in Northern Ireland; No election

The largest party in each council

The 2023 United Kingdom local elections were held on Thursday, 4 May 2023 in England and on Thursday 18 May 2023 in Northern Ireland. These included district councils, unitary authorities, and directly elected mayors in England, and included all local councils in Northern Ireland. Notably, these elections were the first to be held under the Elections Act 2022, a new voter identification law that required voters to show photo ID when attending a polling station, and was a cause for controversy. No local elections were held in Scotland or Wales.

The elections in England saw significant losses for the governing Conservative Party, which lost over 1,000 council seats. The Labour Party, the Liberal Democrats and the Green Party of England and Wales all made gains, with Labour becoming the party with most members elected to local government for the first time since 2002. The Greens won majority control of Mid Suffolk District Council, the party's first ever council majority.

In Northern Ireland, Sinn Féin emerged as the largest party in local government for the first time. These elections were also the first since the creation of Northern Ireland in which nationalist candidates received more votes than unionists.

== England ==
=== Background ===
==== Policy ====
These elections were to be the first under the new voter identification laws. This meant voters would be required to show photo identification when attending a polling station. These new laws were controversial and led to accusations of voter suppression. There were concerns that turnout would be extremely low at the elections due to a combination of lack of ID held by some voters, and many members of the public remaining unaware of the new requirements. The police had been alerted to the possibility of anger and confrontation over these new rules, and polling station staff had been trained to de-escalate situations.

Since late 2021, the cost of living crisis had been growing, leading to government support for help with bills. Changes to waste collection and recycling had been delayed by the Government until after the elections.

==== Narrative ====
A majority of the seats up for election were last elected in 2019. At those elections, the Conservative Party lost over a thousand seats and control of several councils while the Liberal Democrats managed to make the most gains at their expense. The Labour Party also lost seats and control of some councils at the 2019 local elections. In terms of seat numbers, this day of local elections was the biggest since 2019. Many wards had new boundaries.

The year up to the 2023 elections included the political crisis leading to Boris Johnson's resignation, the market turbulence caused by the "mini-budget", and the subsequent credibility crisis leading to Liz Truss' resignation and Rishi Sunak's appointment.

The cost of living crisis and a surge in inflation were significant contributing factors to several strikes in the public sector, with high-profile strikes in the transport sector and the health service. There were also extensive strikes in the postal services, education sector and amongst the civil service. In mid-February 2023, Conservative member of the House of Lords, Lord Hayward, said that the strikes had popular support and were therefore damaging the government and party's chances in the local elections. He argued the strikes needed to stop in order to improve their chances.

The Liberal Democrats had been utilising comments from senior Conservative MPs as part of their advertising in the so-called "blue wall" to draw attention to their undesirable and "toxic" opinions, such as support for the death penalty.

The Labour Party had stated to the press that they want to use these local elections to prepare for the 2024 general election.

The Green Party of England and Wales stood 3,331 candidates, 41% of all seats that were up for election, the most they had ever contested. Over half of the party's 536 total local council seats were to be defended at these elections. The Greens launched their national local elections campaign in Stowmarket, Mid Suffolk, where they were aiming to win majority control, which would be the first time the Greens had won a majority on any council. The Greens were said to have been aiming to win at least 100 new seats, with their appeal spreading to both left and right-wing voters due to dissatisfaction with the main two parties.

==== Predictions ====
The Conservatives had been performing poorly in national polls leading up to these elections. They had been more than 20 points behind the Labour party in national opinion polling, though the gap had been narrowing. Conservative Party chair Greg Hands MP publicly recognised that this election would be difficult for the party and referred to analysis that suggested they would lose more than 1,000 seats. This estimate was based on comments by British academics Colin Rallings and Michael Thrasher, who said current polling would put conservative seat losses at around 1,000, while Labour would gain around 700 seats. President of the British Polling Council Sir John Curtice had described the electorate as "increasingly sophisticated" in using tactical voting to defeat the Conservative party candidates. For this reason Sir John Curtice said the Conservative Party could actually end up losing well over 1,000 seats if the tactical voting is a big factor, which director of polling company Savanta, Chris Hopkins, agreed with. A website was created to inform voters how to vote to have the best chance to unseat the Conservatives in their local area, and it received publicity thanks to endorsements from several public figures.

Labour NEC member Luke Akehurst stated that he expected the party to make its best gains in seat numbers since 2012, when it gained 847 seats (next best being a net gain of 288 seats), but expected varied results in terms of council control.

Sky News reported that YouGov predictions were pointing towards Labour gains in the North and the Midlands. That same report showed that Conservative-controlled Swindon council looked set to switch control to Labour, and some other councils would move into Labour control from no overall control, or move to no overall control from Conservative. East Cambridgeshire was predicted to switch from Conservative control to Liberal Democrat. Sky News also reported that if the Conservatives only lost 500 seats they may feel "relatively unscathed"; if they lost 750 they could argue that Labour was not performing as well as the polls suggest, but over 1,000 seat losses would be "difficult to spin".

=== Campaigning ===
Conservatives

7,512 / 8,063 (93%)

Labour Party

6,232 / 8,063 (77%)

Liberal Democrats

4,816 / 8,063 (60%)

Green Party (E&W)

3,322 / 8,063 (41%)

Reform UK

471 / 8,063 (6%)

— Seats contested by party, Election Maps UK

The Conservative Party launched its campaign on 24 March 2023 in the Midlands when Rishi Sunak visited some local sites along with West Midlands Mayor Andy Street and local MPs. There was some confusion as to whether this had been the campaign launch, but Conservative headquarters later confirmed the launch had happened.

The Liberal Democrats launched its campaign on 29 March 2023 in Berkhamsted, Hertfordshire, when the party leader, Ed Davey, drove a tractor into a ‘Blue Wall’ of hay bales.

Labour launched its campaign on 30 March 2023 in Swindon with speeches from Keir Starmer, Angela Rayner and Rachel Reeves.

The Green Party of England and Wales launched its campaign in early April 2023 in Stowmarket, Suffolk, with speeches from co-leaders Adrian Ramsay and Carla Denyer.

On 31 March 2023, Rishi Sunak was photographed looking at a pothole in Darlington to raise awareness of new powers to prevent potholes from forming and to help fix them.

There were rumours that the Conservative Party would turn to Boris Johnson to help boost the parties chances by having him join the campaign trail. There had been earlier reports stating that the Conservative Party election leaflets and campaign material did not show pictures of Rishi Sunak, but instead showed images of Boris Johnson, Michael Gove and Suella Braverman.

Amid the campaign, Sunak was accused of a conflict of interest over his wife's shares in a childcare agency that benefits from the latest budget policy. This led to Sunak declaring his wife's shares as a financial interest on 19 April 2023.

Whilst there is no fixed date for the pre-election period to begin, the UK government's guidance was that special care should be taken from 13 April 2023, three weeks before the election date in England. The Liberal Democrats called for an investigation into Sunak's alleged flouting of these rules by making a speech on his proposed "maths to 18" policy after this date, although a spokesperson for the government said the announcement was within the rules.

A further distraction to the election campaign came in the form of the Dominic Raab bullying scandal. In February 2023 Raab said he would quit if the government's independent ethics adviser, Adam Tolley KC, upheld the bullying claim against him. Sunak received the report on 20 April and Raab resigned the next day.

The list of candidates put forward in strongly Tory-held Bracknell Forest Council led to local Labour and Liberal Democrat parties being accused of going against their national party leaderships by forming a de facto 'progressive alliance' to defeat the Conservative candidates. The local parties denied this was planned and suggested a struggle for candidates and cash had led to the choices of which seats to challenge for. The Greens were also said to be involved in this arrangement; however, they only stood three candidates in the 2019 locals in Bracknell yet were standing seven in these elections, including in seats also contested by Labour or the Liberal Democrats.

==== Rishi Sunak attack ads ====
A month before the local elections, several attack ads were produced by Labour targeting Rishi Sunak and the Conservative Party's record in government as a whole, focusing on issues such as crime, the economy, and health and social care. One of these ads featured the controversial claim that Sunak did not want child sex abusers to be jailed, which referred to the Conservatives' record on prosecuting child sex abusers. The figures covered the period starting in 2010 - five years before Sunak became an MP and 11 years before he became prime minister - and ending in 2022. Other attack ads accused Sunak of being soft on gun crime and suggesting thieves should not be punished, and another referred to Sunak's wife Akshata Murty and her previously held non-dom tax status.

Labour's decision to target Sunak personally caused upset amongst current and former MPs from a wide range of parties, with Liberal Democrat leader Ed Davey saying that parties "should not have personal attacks on other politicians". Senior Conservative MP Tobias Ellwood called the attack "appalling" and said politicians "should be better than this", while former Labour Home Secretary David Blunkett said it was "deeply offensive". Journalist Andrew Marr called the attack ads "disgraceful", saying "Attack ads are fundamental to politics. But the smear campaign against Rishi Sunak is a strategic and moral error."

When asked about the controversial claim, Sunak said politicians should offer "less talk, more action". Starmer responded by backing the message "no matter how squeamish it might make some feel" by saying: "I make no apologies for highlighting the failures of this government. This argument that because they've changed the prime minister five times that somehow the PM doesn't bear responsibility for 13 years of grief for many people I just don't think stacks up." Wes Streeting said it was "perfectly reasonable to challenge a Conservative prime minister on the abysmal failure of 13 years of Conservative government".

In September 2023, another attack ad targeting Sunak was released, this time accusing him of not believing schools should be safe. The ad was released amid the government's investigation of the extent of problems with crumbling concrete, which effected dozens of schools.

=== Election day ===
==== Impact of voter ID requirement ====
ITV News reported that tellers had told them between 10 and 25% of voters in Oxfordshire were unable to cast their ballots due to the new measures. The chair of the Electoral Commission was quoted as saying that "It appears that the government has designed a system which denies the prospect of sensible and co-ordinated information collection and makes it almost impossible to judge the true impact of the introduction of voter ID". The Guardian reported that some transgender electors were not being allowed to vote because their identity documents did not match their new name as recorded on the electoral roll. Disabled and clinically vulnerable voters were also turned away due to a requirement to remove face masks.

=== Results ===
==== Great Britain ====
The table below shows the results of these elections, along with the overall number of councillors in Great Britain for each party following the elections.

| Party | Councillors | | | Councils | | |
| Party | Won | After | +/- (Note: Because the number of council seats shifts every year due to boundary changes and local government reorganisation, changes are notional changes calculated by the BBC.) | Won | After | +/- |
|---|---|---|---|---|---|---|
| Labour | 2,675 | 6,507 | ▲537 | 71 | 108 | ▲22 |
| Conservative | 2,296 | 5,702 | ▼1,063 | 33 | 70 | ▼48 |
| Liberal Democrats | 1,628 | 2,992 | ▲407 | 29 | 37 | ▲12 |
| Green | 481 | 789 | ▲241 | 1 | 1 | ▲1 |
| SNP | —N/a (Note: There were no elections in Scotland in 2023.) | 452 | Steady | 0 | 1 | Steady |
| Plaid Cymru | —N/a (Note: There were no elections in Wales in 2023.) | 203 | Steady | 0 | 4 | Steady |
| Aspire | —N/a (Note: Aspire only contests elections in Tower Hamlets; there were no elections in Tower Hamlets in 2023.) | 24 | Steady | 0 | 1 | Steady |
| Reform | 6 | 10 | ▲2 | 0 | 0 | Steady |
| Independent | 971 | 1,920 | ▼120 | 4 | 7 | ▲1 |
| No overall control | —N/a | | | 92 | 140 | ▲12 |

==== Results analysis ====
Analysis by party
| Party | Councillors | | Councils | |
| Party | Number | Change | Number | Change |
|---|---|---|---|---|
| No overall control | —N/a | | 92 | ▲12 |
| Labour | 2,675 | ▲537 | 71 | ▲22 |
| Conservative | 2,296 | ▼1,063 | 33 | ▼48 |
| Liberal Democrats | 1,628 | ▲407 | 29 | ▲12 |
| Independent | 864 | ▼89 | 2 | ▲1 |
| Green | 481 | ▲241 | 1 | ▲1 |
| Residents | 99 | ▼13 | 2 | Steady |
| Liberal | 4 | ▲2 | 0 | Steady |
| Yorkshire | 3 | ▲1 | 0 | Steady |
| SDP | 2 | ▲1 | 0 | Steady |
| UKIP | 0 | ▼25 | 0 | Steady |
| Post-election vacancy | 24 | | —N/a | |

Projected proportion of aggregate votes
| Party | BBC | | | Sky News |
| Party | % | Change from | | % |
| Party | % | 2022 | 2019 | % |
|---|---|---|---|---|
| Labour | 35% | Steady | ▲7 | 36% |
| Conservative | 26% | ▼4 | ▼2 | 29% |
| Liberal Democrats | 20% | ▲1 | ▲1 | 18% |
| Others | 19% | ▲2 | ▼6 | 17% |

The Labour Party achieved its largest lead in local elections over the Conservative Party since 1997. Its support recovered after a series of mediocre local election results over the previous few years; however, its projected national share of the vote remained at 35%, the same as in 2022. The Conservative Party fell to 26% in the BBC Projected National Share, its worst result ever in local elections, apart from 1995 and 2013. The Liberal Democrats and Greens made significant gains in the south of England, with some councils with safe Conservative seats at the parliamentary level voting for the opposition parties. The Liberal Democrats achieved their best result in local elections since the Cameron–Clegg coalition in 2010 with a projected national vote share of 20%. The Greens achieved their best ever result in English local elections, winning majority control of a council for the first time.

=== Results by party ===
==== Conservative ====
These elections were the first local elections of the Premiership of Rishi Sunak, and saw the Conservatives lose over 1,000 councillor seats, with major gains achieved by Labour, the Liberal Democrats, and the Green Party of England and Wales. Labour also overtook the Conservatives as holding the highest number of members elected to local government for the first time since 2002. The Conservatives did take two councils; Torbay Council in Devon, and Wyre Forest District Council in Worcestershire.

==== Labour ====
Labour saw a net gain of 537 councillors and 22 councils. Labour became the party with most members elected to local government for the first time since 2002. The only council that Labour lost was Slough Borough Council, where 16 Tory gains took the council into no overall control, the first time in 15 years. Labour also retained Leicester City Council but lost 22 seats to the Conservatives, Liberal Democrats and Greens.

==== Liberal Democrats ====
The Liberal Democrats saw considerable gains, gaining 407 councillors and winning control of 12 more councils. Gains were concentrated in the Blue wall.

==== Independents ====
Independents and residents associations were reported to have benefitted from voter disillusion. The Canvey Island Independent Party gained increased seats on Castle Point Borough Council, despite the Council remaining under no overall control. The Boston District Independents won a majority on Boston Borough Council. The Ashfield Independents increased their majority by two seats on the Ashfield District Council, taking a seat each off of the Conservatives and Labour, for a total seat count of 32.

==== Green Party ====
The Green Party of England and Wales gained over 240 councillors across England, and won majority control of Mid Suffolk District Council, the party's first ever council majority. Despite losing minority-control of Brighton and Hove City Council to Labour, the Greens became the largest party on seven other councils: East Hertfordshire District Council, Lewes District Council, Warwick, Babergh, East Suffolk, Forest of Dean and Folkestone & Hythe. 2023 saw the party's best ever results in a local election.

==== Other parties ====
Reform UK jointly nominated some of the winning Reform Derby candidates who won 6 seats on Derby City Council. but failed to make a breakthrough with its own candidates on any other councils, averaging 6% of the vote in the wards where it stood.

The UK Independence Party lost all six seats it was defending. The Daily Telegraph reported that UKIP voters had flocked to Labour and independents.

The Liberal Party won four seats bringing their total to five. The Yorkshire Party won three seats in the East Riding of Yorkshire. The Social Democratic Party won a second seat on Leeds City Council.

=== Metropolitan boroughs ===
There are thirty-six metropolitan boroughs, which are single-tier local authorities. Thirty-three of them elect a third of their councillors every year for three years, with no election in each fourth year. These councils hold their elections on the same timetable, which includes elections in 2023. Due to boundary changes, seven councils which generally elect their councillors in thirds, will elect all of their councillors in 2023. They will then return to the thirds schedule.

In 2021, the government appointed commissioners to oversee Liverpool City Council following an investigation into the mayor of Liverpool Joe Anderson. In 2022, the government announced it would take greater control of the council. Liverpool was required to move to all-out elections from 2023 under new boundaries following a report by the government commissioner Max Caller.

Wirral Council has also decided to move to all-out elections from 2023, on the existing ward boundaries.

==== Whole council ====
| Council | Seats | Party control | | Details |
| Council | Seats | Previous | Result | Details |
|---|---|---|---|---|
| Bolton | 60 (Note: New election boundaries) | No overall control (Conservative minority) | No overall control (Labour minority) | Details |
| Liverpool | 85 | Labour | Labour | Details |
| Oldham | 60 | Labour | Labour | Details |
| Stockport | 63 | No overall control (Lib Dem minority) | No overall control (Lib Dem minority) | Details |
| Tameside | 57 | Labour | Labour | Details |
| Trafford | 63 | Labour | Labour | Details |
| Wigan | 75 | Labour | Labour | Details |
| Wirral | 66 | No overall control | No overall control (Labour minority) | Details |
| Wolverhampton | 60 | Labour | Labour | Details |
| All councils | 609 | | | |

==== Third of council ====
By-elections or uncontested wards can cause the seats up for election to be above or below one third of the council.

| Council | Seats | | Party control | | Details |
| Council | up | of | Previous | Result | Details |
|---|---|---|---|---|---|
| Barnsley | 21 | 63 | Labour | Labour | Details |
| Bradford | 30 | 90 | Labour | Labour | Details |
| Bury | 17 | 51 | Labour | Labour | Details |
| Calderdale | 17 | 51 | Labour | Labour | Details |
| Coventry | 18 | 54 | Labour | Labour | Details |
| Dudley | 24 | 72 | Conservative | Conservative | Details |
| Gateshead | 22 | 66 | Labour | Labour | Details |
| Kirklees | 23 | 69 | Labour | Labour | Details |
| Knowsley | 15 | 45 | Labour | Labour | Details |
| Leeds | 33 | 99 | Labour | Labour | Details |
| Manchester | 32 | 96 | Labour | Labour | Details |
| Newcastle upon Tyne | 26 | 78 | Labour | Labour | Details |
| North Tyneside | 20 | 60 | Labour | Labour | Details |
| Rochdale | 20 | 60 | Labour | Labour | Details |
| Salford | 20 | 60 | Labour | Labour | Details |
| Sandwell | 24 | 72 | Labour | Labour | Details |
| Sefton | 22 | 66 | Labour | Labour | Details |
| Sheffield | 28 | 84 | No overall control (Labour minority) | No overall control (Lab/LDm/Grn coalition) | Details |
| Solihull | 17 | 51 | Conservative | Conservative | Details |
| South Tyneside | 18 | 54 | Labour | Labour | Details |
| Sunderland | 25 | 75 | Labour | Labour | Details |
| Wakefield | 21 | 63 | Labour | Labour | Details |
| Walsall | 20 | 60 | Conservative | Conservative | Details |
| All councils | | | | | |

=== Unitary councils ===
==== Whole council ====
| Council | Seats | Party control | | Details |
| Council | Seats | Previous | Result | Details |
|---|---|---|---|---|
| Bath and North East Somerset | 59 | Liberal Democrats | Liberal Democrats | Details |
| Bedford | 46 | No overall control (Lib Dem mayor; Lib Dem/Lab/Ind coalition) | No overall control (Con mayor) | Details |
| Blackpool | 42 | Labour | Labour | Details |
| Bournemouth, Christchurch and Poole | 76 | No overall control (Conservative minority) | No overall control (Lib Dem/CI/PP/Ind coalition) | Details |
| Bracknell Forest | 41 | Conservative | Labour | Details |
| Brighton and Hove | 54 | No overall control (Green minority) | Labour | Details |
| Central Bedfordshire | 63 | Conservative | No overall control (Ind minority) | Details |
| Cheshire East | 82 | No overall control (Labour/Ind coalition) | No overall control | Details |
| Cheshire West and Chester | 70 | No overall control (Labour minority) | Labour | Details |
| Darlington | 50 | No overall control (Conservative minority) | No overall control | Details |
| Derby | 51 (Note: This is the first election where all seats in Derby City Council are up for election having previously elected by thirds) | No overall control (Conservative minority) | No overall control | Details |
| East Riding of Yorkshire | 67 | Conservative | No overall control | Details |
| Herefordshire | 53 | No overall control (Ind/Green coalition) | No overall control | Details |
| Leicester | 54 | Labour | Labour | Details |
| Luton | 48 | Labour | Labour | Details |
| Medway | 59 | Conservative | Labour | Details |
| Middlesbrough | 46 | No overall control (Ind mayor) | Labour | Details |
| North Lincolnshire | 43 | Conservative | Conservative | Details |
| North Somerset | 50 | No overall control (Ind/Lib Dem/Lab/Ind Group/Green coalition) | No overall control | Details |
| Nottingham | 55 | Labour | Labour | Details |
| Redcar and Cleveland | 59 | No overall control (Ind Group/Lib Dem coalition) | No overall control | Details |
| Rutland | 27 | No overall control | No overall control | Details |
| Slough | 42 | Labour | No overall control | Details |
| Southampton | 51 | Labour | Labour | Details |
| South Gloucestershire | 61 | Conservative | No overall control | Details |
| Stockton-on-Tees | 56 | No overall control (Labour minority) | No overall control | Details |
| Stoke-on-Trent | 44 | No overall control (Conservative minority) | Labour | Details |
| Telford and Wrekin | 54 | Labour | Labour | Details |
| Torbay | 36 | No overall control | Conservative | Details |
| West Berkshire | 43 | Conservative | Liberal Democrats | Details |
| Windsor & Maidenhead | 41 | Conservative | Liberal Democrats | Details |
| York | 47 | No overall control (Lib Dem/Green coalition) | Labour | Details |
| All councils | | | | |

==== Third of council ====
| Council | Seats | | Party control | | Details |
| Council | up | of | Previous | Result | Details |
|---|---|---|---|---|---|
| Blackburn with Darwen | 17 | 51 | Labour | Labour | Details |
| Halton | 18 | 54 | Labour | Labour | Details |
| Hartlepool | 12 | 36 | No overall control | No overall control | Details |
| Hull | 19 | 57 | Liberal Democrats | Liberal Democrats | Details |
| Milton Keynes | 19 | 57 | No overall control (Lab/Lib Dem coalition) | No overall control | Details |
| North East Lincolnshire | 15 | 42 | Conservative | Conservative | Details |
| Peterborough | 20 | 60 | No overall control (Con minority) | No overall control | Details |
| Plymouth | 19 | 57 | No overall control (Con minority) | Labour | Details |
| Portsmouth | 14 | 42 | No overall control (Lib Dem minority) | No overall control | Details |
| Reading | 17 | 48 | Labour | Labour | Details |
| Southend-on-Sea | 17 | 51 | No overall control (Lab/Lib Dem/Ind coalition) | No overall control | Details |
| Swindon | 19 | 57 | Conservative | Labour | Details |
| Thurrock | 16 | 49 | Conservative | Conservative | Details |
| Wokingham | 18 | 54 | No overall control (Lib Dem/Lab/Ind coalition) | No overall control | Details |
| All councils | | | | | |

=== District councils ===
District councils are the lower tier of a two-tier system of local government, with several district councils covering the same area as a county council with different responsibilities.

==== Whole council ====
| Council | Seats | Party control | | Details |
| Council | Seats | Previous | Result | Details |
|---|---|---|---|---|
| Amber Valley | 42 | Conservative | Labour | Details |
| Arun | 54 | No overall control (Conservative minority) | No overall control (Lib Dem/Lab/Green coalition) | Details |
| Ashfield | 35 | Ashfield Ind. | Ashfield Ind. | Details |
| Ashford | 47 | Conservative | No overall control | Details |
| Babergh | 32 | No overall control | No overall control (Green/Ind/Lib Dem coalition) | Details |
| Bassetlaw | 48 | Labour | Labour | Details |
| Blaby | 36 | Conservative | Conservative | Details |
| Bolsover | 37 | Labour | Labour | Details |
| Boston | 30 | No overall control | Boston District Independents | Details |
| Braintree | 49 | Conservative | Conservative | Details |
| Breckland | 49 | Conservative | Conservative | Details |
| Broadland | 47 | Conservative | No overall control (Lib Dem/Green/Lab coalition) | Details |
| Bromsgrove | 31 | Conservative | No overall control | Details |
| Broxtowe | 44 | No overall control | Labour | Details |
| Canterbury | 39 | Conservative | No overall control | Details |
| Charnwood | 52 | Conservative | No overall control (Labour minority) | Details |
| Chelmsford | 57 | Liberal Democrats | Liberal Democrats | Details |
| Chesterfield | 40 | Labour | Labour | Details |
| Chichester | 36 | No overall control (Conservative minority) | Liberal Democrats | Details |
| Cotswold | 34 | Liberal Democrats | Liberal Democrats | Details |
| Dacorum | 51 | Conservative | Liberal Democrats | Details |
| Dartford | 42 | Conservative | Conservative | Details |
| Derbyshire Dales | 34 | Conservative | No overall control (Lib Dem/Labour/Green coalition) | Details |
| Dover | 32 | Conservative | Labour | Details |
| Eastbourne | 27 | Liberal Democrats | Liberal Democrats | Details |
| East Cambridgeshire | 28 | Conservative | Conservative | Details |
| East Devon | 60 | No overall control | No overall control | Details |
| East Hampshire | 43 | Conservative | No overall control | Details |
| East Hertfordshire | 50 | Conservative | No overall control (Green/Lib Dem coalition) | Details |
| East Lindsey | 55 | Conservative | No overall control | Details |
| East Staffordshire | 37 | Conservative | Labour | Details |
| East Suffolk | 55 | Conservative | No overall control (GreenLib Dem/Ind coalition) | Details |
| Epsom and Ewell | 35 | Residents Association | Residents Association | Details |
| Erewash | 47 | Conservative | Labour | Details |
| Fenland | 43 | Conservative | Conservative | Details |
| Folkestone & Hythe | 30 | No overall control | No overall control | Details |
| Forest of Dean | 38 | No overall control | No overall control (Green minority) | Details |
| Fylde | 37 | Conservative | Conservative | Details |
| Gedling | 41 | Labour | Labour | Details |
| Gravesham | 39 | No overall control | Labour | Details |
| Great Yarmouth | 39 | Conservative | No overall control | Details |
| Guildford | 48 | No overall control | Liberal Democrats | Details |
| Harborough | 34 | Conservative | No overall control | Details |
| Hertsmere | 39 | Conservative | No overall control | Details |
| High Peak | 43 | No overall control | Labour | Details |
| Hinckley and Bosworth | 34 | Liberal Democrats | Liberal Democrats | Details |
| Horsham | 48 | Conservative | Liberal Democrats | Details |
| King's Lynn and West Norfolk | 55 | Conservative | No overall control | Details |
| Lancaster | 61 | No overall control | No overall control | Details |
| Lewes | 41 | No overall control (Lib Dem/Green/Ind/Lab coalition) | No overall control (Green/Lab coalition) | Details |
| Lichfield | 47 | Conservative | No overall control | Details |
| Maldon | 31 | No overall control | No overall control | Details |
| Malvern Hills | 31 | No overall control | No overall control | Details |
| Mansfield | 36 | No overall control (Labour mayor) | Labour | Details |
| Melton | 28 | Conservative | No overall control | Details |
| Mid Devon | 42 | No overall control | Liberal Democrats | Details |
| Mid Suffolk | 34 | No overall control | Green | Details |
| Mid Sussex | 48 | Conservative | No overall control | Details |
| Mole Valley | 39 | Liberal Democrats | Liberal Democrats | Details |
| New Forest | 48 | Conservative | Conservative | Details |
| Newark and Sherwood | 39 | Conservative | No overall control | Details |
| North Devon | 42 | Liberal Democrats | Liberal Democrats | Details |
| North East Derbyshire | 53 | No overall control | Labour | Details |
| North Kesteven | 43 | No overall control | Conservative | Details |
| North Norfolk | 40 | Liberal Democrats | Liberal Democrats | Details |
| North Warwickshire | 35 | Conservative | No overall control | Details |
| North West Leicestershire | 38 | Conservative | No overall control | Details |
| Oadby and Wigston | 26 | Liberal Democrats | Liberal Democrats | Details |
| Ribble Valley | 40 | Conservative | No overall control | Details |
| Rother | 38 | No overall control | No overall control | Details |
| Rushcliffe | 44 | Conservative | Conservative | Details |
| Sevenoaks | 54 | Conservative | Conservative | Details |
| South Derbyshire | 36 | No overall control | Labour | Details |
| South Hams | 31 | Conservative | Liberal Democrats | Details |
| South Holland | 37 | Conservative | Conservative | Details |
| South Kesteven | 56 | Conservative | No overall control | Details |
| South Norfolk | 46 | Conservative | Conservative | Details |
| South Oxfordshire | 36 | No overall control | Liberal Democrats | Details |
| South Ribble | 50 | No overall control | Labour | Details |
| South Staffordshire | 42 | Conservative | Conservative | Details |
| Spelthorne | 39 | No overall control | No overall control | Details |
| Stafford | 40 | No overall control (Conservative minority) | No overall control | Details |
| Staffordshire Moorlands | 56 | Conservative | No overall control | Details |
| Stratford-on-Avon | 41 | Conservative | Liberal Democrats | Details |
| Surrey Heath | 35 | No overall control (Conservative minority) | Liberal Democrats | Details |
| Swale | 47 | No overall control | No overall control | Details |
| Teignbridge | 47 | No overall control (Liberal Democrats minority) | Liberal Democrats | Details |
| Tendring | 48 | No overall control | No overall control | Details |
| Test Valley | 43 | Conservative | Conservative | Details |
| Tewkesbury | 38 | Conservative | No overall control | Details |
| Thanet | 56 | No overall control (Conservative minority) | Labour | Details |
| Tonbridge and Malling | 44 | Conservative | No overall control | Details |
| Torridge | 36 | No overall control | No overall control | Details |
| Uttlesford | 39 | R4U | R4U | Details |
| Vale of White Horse | 38 | Liberal Democrats | Liberal Democrats | Details |
| Warwick | 44 | No overall control | No overall control (Green/Labour coalition) | Details |
| Waverley | 50 | No overall control | No overall control | Details |
| Wealden | 45 | Conservative | No overall control | Details |
| West Devon | 31 | Conservative | No overall control | Details |
| West Lancashire | 45 | No overall control (Labour minority) | Labour | Details |
| West Lindsey | 36 | No overall control (Conservative minority) | No overall control | Details |
| West Suffolk | 64 | Conservative | No overall control | Details |
| Wychavon | 43 | Conservative | Conservative | Details |
| Wyre | 50 | Conservative | Conservative | Details |
| Wyre Forest | 33 | No overall control | Conservative | Details |
| All councils | | | | |

==== Third of council ====
| Council | Seats | | Party control | | Details |
| Council | up | of | Previous | Result | Details |
|---|---|---|---|---|---|
| Basildon | 14 | 42 | Conservative | Conservative | Details |
| Basingstoke and Deane | 18 | 54 | No overall control (Conservative minority) | No overall control | Details |
| Brentwood | 12 | 37 | Conservative | No overall control | Details |
| Broxbourne | 10 | 30 | Conservative | Conservative | Details |
| Burnley | 15 | 45 | No overall control (Lab/Lib Dem coalition) | No overall control (Lab/Lib Dem coalition) | Details |
| Cambridge | 14 | 42 | Labour | Labour | Details |
| Cannock Chase | 15 | 41 | Conservative | No overall control | Details |
| Castle Point | 14 | 41 | No overall control (Ind coalition) | No overall control | Details |
| Cherwell | 16 | 48 | Conservative | No overall control | Details |
| Chorley | 14 | 42 | Labour | Labour | Details |
| Colchester | 17 | 51 | No overall control (Lib Dem/Lab/Green coalition) | No overall control | Details |
| Crawley | 12 | 36 | Labour | Labour | Details |
| Eastleigh | 13 | 39 | Liberal Democrats | Liberal Democrats | Details |
| Elmbridge | 16 | 48 | No overall control (Lib Dem/Residents coalition) | No overall control | Details |
| Epping Forest | 18 | 58 | Conservative | Conservative | Details |
| Exeter | 13 | 39 | Labour | Labour | Details |
| Harlow | 11 | 33 | Conservative | Conservative | Details |
| Hart | 11 | 33 | No overall control (Community Campaign (Hart)/Lib Dem coalition) | No overall control | Details |
| Havant | 10 | 38 | Conservative | Conservative | Details |
| Hyndburn | 12 | 35 | No overall control (Labour minority) | No overall control | Details |
| Ipswich | 16 | 48 | Labour | Labour | Details |
| Lincoln | 11 | 33 | Labour | Labour | Details |
| Maidstone | 18 | 55 | Conservative | No overall control | Details |
| North Hertfordshire | 16 | 49 | No overall control (Lab/Lib Dem coalition) | No overall control | Details |
| Norwich | 13 | 39 | Labour | Labour | Details |
| Pendle | 11 | 33 | Conservative | No overall control | Details |
| Preston | 16 | 48 | Labour | Labour | Details |
| Redditch | 10 | 29 | Conservative | Conservative | Details |
| Reigate and Banstead | 15 | 45 | Conservative | Conservative | Details |
| Rochford | 13 | 39 | Conservative | No overall control | Details |
| Rossendale | 12 | 36 | Labour | Labour | Details |
| Rugby | 14 | 42 | Conservative | No overall control | Details |
| Runnymede | 14 | 41 | Conservative | No overall control | Details |
| Rushmoor | 13 | 39 | Conservative | Conservative | Details |
| St Albans | 18 | 56 | Liberal Democrats | Liberal Democrats | Details |
| Stevenage | 13 | 39 | Labour | Labour | Details |
| Tamworth | 10 | 30 | Conservative | No overall control | Details |
| Tandridge | 14 | 42 | No overall control | No overall control | Details |
| Three Rivers | 13 | 39 | Liberal Democrats | Liberal Democrats | Details |
| Tunbridge Wells | 16 | 48 | No overall control (Lib Dem/Ind/Lab coalition) | No overall control | Details |
| Watford | 12 | 36 | Liberal Democrats | Liberal Democrats | Details |
| Welwyn Hatfield | 16 | 48 | Conservative | No overall control | Details |
| West Oxfordshire | 16 | 49 | No overall control (Lib Dem/Labour/Green coalition) | No overall control | Details |
| Winchester | 16 | 45 | Liberal Democrats | Liberal Democrats | Details |
| Woking | 10 | 30 | Liberal Democrats | Liberal Democrats | Details |
| Worcester | 11 | 35 | No overall control | No overall control | Details |
| Worthing | 11 | 37 | Labour | Labour | Details |
| All councils | | | | | |

=== Mayoral elections ===
| Council | Mayor before | Mayor-elect |
|---|---|---|
| Bedford | Dave Hodgson (Lib Dem) | Tom Wootton (Con) |
| Leicester | Peter Soulsby (Lab) | Peter Soulsby (Lab) |
| Mansfield | Andy Abrahams (Lab) | Andy Abrahams (Lab) |
| Middlesbrough | Andy Preston (Ind) | Chris Cooke (Labour Co-op) |

The voting system for mayoral elections was first-past-the-post - replacing the supplementary vote used for all previous mayoral elections.

=== Post-election vacancies ===
A number of seats remained vacant following the elections resulting in at least 24 post election vacancies:

- Bath and North East Somerset Council, Paulton ward, death of candidate.
- Bournemouth, Christchurch and Poole Council, East Cliff and Springbourne ward, resignation of councillor five days after being elected due to health issues.
- Dudley Metropolitan Borough Council, Cradley and Wollescote ward, death of councillor within a week of his re-election.
- South Derbyshire District Council, Hilton ward, death of candidate.
- Southampton City Council, Coxford ward, death of candidate.
- Sunderland City Council, Hendon ward, death of candidate.
- Surrey Heath Borough Council, Frimley Green ward, death of candidate.
- Stockton-on-Tees Borough Council, Hartburn ward, death of candidate.
- West Devon Borough Council, Burrator Ward, death of candidate.
- Worcester City Council, Nunnery ward, death of councillor within a week of his re-election.
- Wyre Borough Council, Warren ward, death of candidate.

=== Opinion polling ===
Multiple polls were undertaken and published to ascertain voting intention ahead of the local elections.

| Dates conducted | Pollster | Client | Sample size | Con | Lab | Lib Dem | Green (E&W) | Reform | Other | Lead |
|---|---|---|---|---|---|---|---|---|---|---|
| 27–28 Apr 2023 | Omnisis | N/A | 759 | 26% | 37% | 17% | 9% | 4% | 6% | 11 |
| 24–28 Apr 2023 | Survation | Good Morning Britain | 2,014 | 23% | 33% | 18% | 11% | – | 14% | 10 |
| 10–13 Feb 2023 | Focaldata | ? | 1,039 | 29% | 49% | 8% | 3% | 6% | ?% | 20 |
| 2 May 2019 | 2019 local elections (Note: The majority of the seats up for election in 2023 were last up for election in 2019.) | | 9,509,176 | 31.4% | 26.6% | 16.8% | 9.2% | – (Note: Party had recently formed at the time of the elections, but was unable to contest the election and field candidates due to electoral law.) | 15.9% | 4.8 |

== Northern Ireland ==
| Council | Seats | Largest party (elected in 2019) | | Details |
| Council | Seats | Prior | Post | Details |
|---|---|---|---|---|
| Belfast | 60 | Sinn Féin (18) | Sinn Féin (22) | Details |
| Ards & North Down | 40 | DUP (14) (Note: Reduced to 12 due to defections.) | DUP (14) | Details |
| Antrim & Newtownabbey | 40 | DUP (14) | DUP (13) | Details |
| Lisburn & Castlereagh | 40 | DUP (15) (Note: Reduced to 14 due to defections.) | DUP (14) | Details |
| Newry, Mourne & Down | 41 | Sinn Féin (16) | Sinn Féin (20) | Details |
| Armagh City, Banbridge and Craigavon | 41 | DUP (11) | Sinn Féin (15) | Details |
| Mid & East Antrim | 40 | DUP (15) (Note: Increased to 16 due to defections) | DUP (14) | Details |
| Causeway Coast & Glens | 40 | DUP (14) (Note: Reduced to 13 due to defections.) | DUP (13) | Details |
| Mid Ulster | 40 | Sinn Féin (17) | Sinn Féin (19) | Details |
| Derry City & Strabane | 40 | Sinn Féin (11) | Sinn Féin (18) | Details |
| Derry City & Strabane | 40 | SDLP (11) | Sinn Féin (18) | Details |
| Fermanagh & Omagh | 40 | Sinn Féin (15) | Sinn Féin (21) | Details |
