= 2023 Broxbourne Borough Council election =

2023 English local election

← 2022	4 May 2023	2024 →

10 out of 30 seats to Broxbourne Borough Council 16 seats needed for a majority
- Turnout: 17,216

	First party	Second party
Leader	Lewis Cocking	Carol Bowman
Party	Conservative	Labour
Seats before	27 (Note: Including one vacant seat in the Hoddesdon Town and Rye Park ward previously held by Conservative councillor Aran Banks prior to his resignation in January 2023.)	3
Seats after	27	3
Seat change	Steady	Steady
- Winner of each seat at the 2023 Broxbourne Borough Council election
Leader before election
Lewis Cocking
Conservative
Leader after election
Lewis Cocking
Conservative

The 2023 Broxbourne Borough Council election took place on 4 May 2023, to elect 10 members (one-third) of Broxbourne Borough Council in Hertfordshire, England. All contested seats were held by the original party.

== Results summary ==
Following the results, the council remained under Conservative control.

2023 Broxbourne Borough Council election
Party	This election			Full council			This election		
Party	Seats	Net	Seats %	Other	Total	Total %	Votes	Votes %	+/−
Conservative	9	Steady	90.0	18	27	90.0	8,654	50.3	▼2.1
Labour	1	Steady	10.0	2	3	10.0	5,081	29.5	▲0.2
Green	0	Steady	0.0	0	0	0.0	1,789	10.4	▲1.9
Liberal Democrats	0	Steady	0.0	0	0	0.0	1,418	8.2	▼0.3
Independent	0	Steady	0.0	0	0	0.0	214	1.2	▲0.1
TUSC	0	Steady	0.0	0	0	0.0	60	0.3	▲0.1

== Ward results ==
Candidates by ward:

=== Broxbourne and Hoddesdon South ===
Broxbourne & Hoddesdon South
Party	Candidate	Votes	%	±%
Conservative	Paul Mason	1,269	54.3	▼4.7
Green	Sally Kemp	668	28.6	▲9.7
Labour	Roy Wareham	255	10.9	▼2.7
Liberal Democrats	Kiran Thomas	146	6.2	▼2.3
Majority		601	25.7	▼14.4
Turnout		2,338	31.85	
Conservative hold		Swing		

=== Cheshunt North ===
Cheshunt North
Party	Candidate	Votes	%	±%
Conservative	Sacha Kanatli	719	45.9	▼5.7
Labour	Zahra Spencer	587	37.5	▲3.5
Liberal Democrats	Kostas Inchenko	156	10.0	▲0.8
Green	Madela Baddock	104	6.6	▲1.4
Majority		132	8.4	▼9.2
Turnout		1,566	23.86	
Conservative hold		Swing		

=== Cheshunt South & Theobalds ===
Cheshunt South & Theobalds
Party	Candidate	Votes	%	±%
Conservative	Tony Siracusa	805	45.5	▲0.4
Labour	Ian Dust	654	36.9	▲0.6
Independent	Cody McCormick	214	12.1	▲1.0
Green	Beth Charley	97	5.5	▼2.0
Majority		151	8.6	▼0.2
Turnout		1,770	25.71	
Conservative hold		Swing		

=== Flamstead End ===
Flamstead End
Party	Candidate	Votes	%	±%
Conservative	Paul Seeby	856	60.3	▼0.4
Labour	Lisa Newby	361	25.4	▲1.4
Liberal Democrats	Kypros Savopoulos	100	7.0	▼0.7
Green	Rishi Mehta	91	6.4	▼1.3
TUSC	Aaron Smith	11	0.8	New
Majority		495	34.9	▼1.8
Turnout		1,419	21.67	
Conservative hold		Swing		

=== Goffs Oak ===
Goffs Oak
Party	Candidate	Votes	%	±%
Conservative	Corina Gander	910	51.2	▼3.3
Liberal Democrats	David Payne	569	32.0	▲7.1
Labour	Kathy Condon	200	11.3	▼3.9
Green	Trevor Griffiths	97	5.5	▲0.1
Majority		341	19.2	▼10.4
Turnout		1,776	24.31	
Conservative hold		Swing		

=== Hoddesdon North ===
Hoddesdon North
Party	Candidate	Votes	%	±%
Conservative	Steve Wortley	1,196	61.8	▼0.2
Labour	Janet Wareham	436	22.5	▲0.6
Green	Ian Kemp	154	8.0	▲0.6
Liberal Democrats	Peter Kemp	149	7.7	▼1.0
Majority		760	39.3	▼0.8
Turnout		1,935	26.26	
Conservative hold		Swing		

=== Hoddesdon Town and Rye Park ===
Hoddesdon Town & Rye Park
Party	Candidate	Votes	%	±%
Conservative	Alexander Curtis	746	50.9	▼1.1
Labour	Glynis Evans	447	30.5	▲0.8
Green	Roy Clements	159	10.8	▲0.4
Liberal Democrats	Tim Vizer	114	7.8	▼0.2
Majority		299	20.4	▼1.9
Turnout		1,466	20.78	
Conservative hold		Swing		

=== Rosedale and Bury Green ===
Rosedale & Bury Green
Party	Candidate	Votes	%	±%
Conservative	Martin Greensmyth	732	48.7	▼3.0
Labour	James Spencer	571	38.0	▲5.7
Green	Karen Brett	201	13.4	▲4.0
Majority		161	10.7	▼8.7
Turnout		1,504	22.10	
Conservative hold		Swing		

=== Waltham Cross ===
Waltham Cross
Party	Candidate	Votes	%	±%
Labour	Selina Norgrove	1,000	56.1	▼2.3
Conservative	David McPadden	530	29.7	▼0.7
Liberal Democrats	Fabio Bonfante	114	6.4	▲2.0
Green	Bob Gledhill	90	5.0	▲0.2
TUSC	Christine Thomas	49	2.7	▲0.8
Majority		470	26.4	▲1.6
Turnout		1,783	22.37	
Labour hold		Swing		

=== Wormley and Turnford ===
Wormley & Turnford
Party	Candidate	Votes	%	±%
Conservative	Nick Nicholson	891	53.7	▼3.7
Labour	Mario Angeli	570	34.4	▲3.4
Green	Owen Brett	128	7.7	▲1.7
Liberal Democrats	Seema Rajani	70	4.2	▼1.4
Majority		321	19.3	▼7.1
Turnout		1,659	21.14	
Conservative hold		Swing		
