= 2023 Worthing Borough Council election =

2023 UK local government election

← 2022	4 May 2023	2024 →

12 out of 37 seats to Worthing Borough Council 19 seats needed for a majority

	First party	Second party
Leader	Beccy Cooper	Kevin Jenkins
Party	Labour	Conservative
Last election	23 seats, 46.5%	13 seats, 36.7%
Seats before	23 (Note: Including one vacant seat in Central ward previously held by Labour councillor Jim Deen prior to his resignation in March 2023.)	13
Seats won	9	2
Seats after	24	11
Seat change	▲1	▼2
Popular vote	12,398	8,539
Percentage	45.7%	31.5%
Swing	▼0.8%	▼5.2%
	Third party	Fourth party
Party	Green	Liberal Democrats
Last election	0 seats, 9.9%	1 seat, 6.8%
Seats before	0	1
Seats won	1	0
Seats after	1	1
Seat change	▲1	Steady
Popular vote	3,595	2,422
Percentage	13.3%	8.9%
Swing	▲3.4%	▲2.1%
- Election results by seat in the 2023 Worthing Borough Council Election
Leader before election
Beccy Cooper
Labour
Leader after election
Beccy Cooper
Labour

The 2023 Worthing Borough Council election took place on 4 May 2023 to elect members of Worthing Borough Council in West Sussex, England. This was on the same day as other local elections in England. There were twelve seats up for election, being the usual nominal third of the council plus a by-election in Central ward.

== Summary ==
Prior to the election the council was under Labour majority control. At the election Labour made a net increase of one seat, increasing their majority. The Green Party won their first seat on the council.

== Overall result ==
The overall result was as follows:

2023 Worthing Borough Council election
Party	This election			Full council			This election		
Party	Seats	Net	Seats %	Other	Total	Total %	Votes	Votes %	+/−
Labour	9	+3	75%	15	24	65%	12,398	46%	+15%
Conservative	2	-3	16.6%	9	11	30%	8,539	31.5%	-5%
Liberal Democrats	0	-1	0%	1	1	2.7%	2,422	8.9%	-5.9%
Green	1	+1	8.4%	0	1	2.7%	3,595	13.25%	+
Heritage	0	0	0%	0	0	0%	86		
Reform UK	0	0	0%	0	0	0%	92		

== Results by ward ==
The Statement of Persons Nominated, which details the candidates standing in each ward, was released by Worthing Borough Council following the close of nominations on 5 April 2023. The results for each ward were as follows, with an asterisk (*) indicating an incumbent councillor standing for re-election:

=== Broadwater ===
Broadwater
Party	Candidate	Votes	%	±%
Labour	Dawn Smith*	1,302	57.1	−1.9
Conservative	Diane Guest	627	27.5	+0.4
Green	Kate Orton	181	7.9	+0.9
Liberal Democrats	John Apsey	170	7.4	+0.6
Majority		675	29.4	
Turnout		2,280	33.61	
Labour hold		Swing		

=== Castle ===
Castle
Party	Candidate	Votes	%	±%
Labour	Sophie Cox	1,069	50.3	−4.2
Conservative	Syed Ahmed	677	31.9	+2.6
Liberal Democrats	Nick Wiltshire	224	10.5	−1.6
Green	Christopher Smith	154	7.3	−0.6
Majority		392	18.4	
Turnout		2,124	30.85	
Labour gain from Conservative		Swing		

=== Central ===
Central (2 seats due to by-election)
Party	Candidate	Votes	%	±%
Labour	Caroline Baxter	1,438	59.8	−0.7
Labour	Odul Bozkurt	1,313	54.6	−5.9
Conservative	Josh Harris	573	23.8	+0.5
Conservative	Paisley Thomson	518	21.5	−1.8
Green	Ian Davey	295	12.3	+4.2
Green	Jo Paul	259	10.8	+2.7
Liberal Democrats	Christine Brown	230	9.6	+3.2
Liberal Democrats	Merlin Jones	140	5.8	−0.6
Majority		740	30.8	
Turnout		2,404	31.63	
Labour hold		Swing		
Labour hold		Swing		

=== Gaisford ===
Gaisford
Party	Candidate	Votes	%	±%
Labour	Ferdousi Chowdhury	1,503	56.4	−1.0
Conservative	Bryan Turner	717	26.9	−2.2
Green	Stephen Carleysmith	200	7.5	+0.1
Liberal Democrats	Mark Etchells	154	5.8	−0.3
Reform UK	Edmund Rooke	92	3.5	N/A
Majority		786	29.5	
Turnout		2,666	38.52	
Labour hold		Swing		

=== Goring ===
Goring
Party	Candidate	Votes	%	±%
Green	Claire Hunt	1,597	50.5	+18.0
Conservative	Roy Barraclough*	1,104	34.9	−8.9
Labour	Bruce Taylor	369	11.7	−11.9
Liberal Democrats	Robin Rogers	95	3.0	N/A
Majority		493	15.6	
Turnout		3,165	46.27	
Green gain from Conservative		Swing		

=== Heene ===
Heene
Party	Candidate	Votes	%	±%
Labour	Helen Abrahams	1,273	56.5	+3.0
Conservative	Christina Shane-Chan	620	27.5	−7.9
Green	Henry Morin	189	8.4	−2.7
Liberal Democrats	Trudi Starling	172	7.6	N/A
Majority		653	29.0	
Turnout		2,254	34.49	
Labour hold		Swing		

=== Marine ===
Marine
Party	Candidate	Votes	%	±%
Labour	Vicki Wells	1,444	52.8	−0.8
Conservative	Peter Hensley	897	32.8	−5.7
Green	Karen Chilvers	253	9.2	+1.3
Liberal Democrats	Michael Donin	143	5.2	N/A
Majority		547	20.0	
Turnout		2,737	41.66	
Labour gain from Conservative		Swing		

=== Offington ===
Offington
Party	Candidate	Votes	%	±%
Conservative	Daniel Humphreys*	1,288	53.9	+0.1
Labour	Florence Sanders White	677	28.3	−5.0
Green	Steve Rhodes	231	9.7	−3.2
Liberal Democrats	David Kingston	195	8.2	N/A
Majority		611	15.6	
Turnout		2,391	37.28	
Conservative hold		Swing		

=== Salvington ===
Salvington
Party	Candidate	Votes	%	±%
Conservative	Noel Atkins*	1,152	46.9	−5.9
Labour	Lysanne Skinner	861	35.1	+0.6
Liberal Democrats	Emma Norton	261	10.6	N/A
Green	Sonya Mallin	180	7.3	−5.4
Majority		291	11.8	
Turnout		2,454	34.73	
Conservative hold		Swing		

=== Selden ===
Selden
Party	Candidate	Votes	%	±%
Labour	Carl Walker*	1,368	62.5	+2.2
Conservative	Sarah Blake	503	23.0	−5.4
Green	Clare Marshall	171	7.8	+1.8
Liberal Democrats	Yvonne Leonard	146	6.7	+1.3
Majority		865	39.5	
Turnout		2,188	35.95	
Labour hold		Swing		

=== Tarring ===
Tarring
Party	Candidate	Votes	%	±%
Labour	Hilary Schan	1,158	48.2	−1.0
Liberal Democrats	Iona Harte	632	26.3	+1.0
Conservative	Tom Taylor	381	15.9	−4.1
Green	Karen Brooks	144	6.0	+0.5
Heritage	Arthur Kennard	86	3.6	N/A
Majority		526	21.9	
Turnout		2,401	38.09	
Labour gain from Liberal Democrats		Swing		
