= 2023 Mole Valley District Council election =

2023 UK local government election

| ← 2022 | 4 May 2023 | 2024 → |

All 39 seats to Mole Valley District Council 20 seats needed for a majority

| | First party | Second party | Third party |
|---|---|---|---|
| Leader | Stephen Cooksey | Lynne Brooks | Chris Hunt |
| Party | Liberal Democrats | Conservative | Ashtead Ind. |
| Last election | 24 seats, 45.3% | 10 seats, 32.3% | 7 seats, 12.2% |
| Seats before | 24 | 9 | 6 |
| Seats after | 30 | 3 | 6 |
| Seat change | ▲6 | ▼6 | Steady |
- Map of the results of the 2023 Mole Valley District Council election with Liberal Democrats in yellow, Ashtead Independents in grey and Conservatives in blue.
Leader before election
Stephen Cooksey
Liberal Democrats
Leader after election
Stephen Cooksey
Liberal Democrats

The 2023 Mole Valley District Council election was held on 4 May 2023 to elect members of the Mole Valley District Council in Surrey, England. This election occurred on the same day as other local elections in England. This was the first election following the redrawing of ward boundaries, which reduced the number of councillors by two to 39. All positions were contested. As a result of the election, the Liberal Democrats increased their majority on the council to 30 out of 39 seats.

The polling station in Headley was criticised by a disabled voter due to accessibility issues.

== Summary ==
=== Election result ===
2023 Mole Valley District Council election
| Party | Candidates | Seats | Gains | Losses | Net gain/loss | Seats % | Votes % | Votes | +/− |
|---|---|---|---|---|---|---|---|---|---|
| Liberal Democrats | 39 | 30 | 0 | 0 | ▲6 | 76.9 | 48.4 | 38,140 | +3.1 |
| Ashtead Ind. | 6 | 6 | 0 | 0 | Steady | 15.4 | 10.2 | 8,075 | –2.0 |
| Conservative | 38 | 3 | 0 | 0 | ▼6 | 7.7 | 27.5 | 21,700 | –4.8 |
| Green | 24 | 0 | 0 | 0 | Steady | 0.0 | 10.3 | 8,130 | +4.1 |
| Labour | 9 | 0 | 0 | 0 | Steady | 0.0 | 2.0 | 1,544 | –1.6 |
| Independent | 2 | 0 | 0 | 0 | Steady | 0.0 | 1.6 | 1,241 | N/A |

== Ward results ==
The Statement of Persons Nominated, which details the candidates standing in each ward, was released by Mole Valley District Council following the close of nominations on 5 April 2023.

=== Ashtead Lanes & Common ===
Ashtead Lanes & Common (3 seats)
| Party | Candidate | Votes | % | ±% |
|---|---|---|---|---|
| Ashtead Ind. | Chris Hunt* | 1,636 | 65.9 | N/A |
| Ashtead Ind. | Patricia Wiltshire* | 1,553 | 62.6 | N/A |
| Ashtead Ind. | David Hawksworth* | 1,534 | 61.8 | N/A |
| Liberal Democrats | Philippa Shimmin | 488 | 19.7 | N/A |
| Liberal Democrats | Amanda Hartwell | 425 | 17.1 | N/A |
| Liberal Democrats | Ross Moncur | 422 | 17.0 | N/A |
| Conservative | Debbie Cook | 284 | 11.4 | N/A |
| Conservative | Gavin Newton | 265 | 10.7 | N/A |
| Labour | Susan Gilchrist | 241 | 9.7 | N/A |
| Turnout | | 2,481 | 41.9 | N/A |
| Ashtead Ind. win (new seat) | | | | |
| Ashtead Ind. win (new seat) | | | | |
| Ashtead Ind. win (new seat) | | | | |

=== Ashtead Park ===
Ashtead Park (3 seats)
| Party | Candidate | Votes | % | ±% |
|---|---|---|---|---|
| Ashtead Ind. | Mary Cooper* | 1,242 | 54.2 | N/A |
| Ashtead Ind. | Garry Stansfield* | 1,140 | 49.7 | N/A |
| Ashtead Ind. | Gerry Sevenoaks | 970 | 42.3 | N/A |
| Independent | Raj Patel | 706 | 30.8 | N/A |
| Independent | David Harper* | 535 | 23.3 | N/A |
| Conservative | Kateryna Cutler | 269 | 11.7 | N/A |
| Green | Patricia Brown | 264 | 11.5 | N/A |
| Conservative | Andrew Smith | 253 | 11.0 | N/A |
| Liberal Democrats | Veronica MacLeod | 245 | 10.7 | N/A |
| Conservative | Matthew Wray | 236 | 10.3 | N/A |
| Liberal Democrats | Jolanta Waugh | 215 | 9.4 | N/A |
| Liberal Democrats | Andrew Cressy | 200 | 8.7 | N/A |
| Labour | Steve Eagle | 136 | 5.9 | N/A |
| Green | Greg Smith | 118 | 5.1 | N/A |
| Turnout | | 2,292 | 42.0 | N/A |
| Ashtead Ind. win (new seat) | | | | |
| Ashtead Ind. win (new seat) | | | | |
| Ashtead Ind. win (new seat) | | | | |

=== Bookham East & Eastwick Park ===
Bookham East & Eastwick Park (3 seats)
| Party | Candidate | Votes | % | ±% |
|---|---|---|---|---|
| Liberal Democrats | Elizabeth Daly* | 1,577 | 60.7 | N/A |
| Liberal Democrats | Paul Kennedy* | 1,568 | 60.4 | N/A |
| Liberal Democrats | Andrew Matthews | 1,467 | 56.5 | N/A |
| Conservative | Sarah Chambers* | 994 | 38.3 | N/A |
| Conservative | Richard Swinbank | 834 | 32.1 | N/A |
| Conservative | Patrick Morrish | 800 | 30.8 | N/A |
| Green | Emily Stewart | 176 | 6.8 | N/A |
| Labour | Bill Mansfield | 80 | 3.1 | N/A |
| Turnout | | 2,598 | 53.3 | N/A |
| Liberal Democrats win (new seat) | | | | |
| Liberal Democrats win (new seat) | | | | |
| Liberal Democrats win (new seat) | | | | |

=== Bookham West ===
Bookham West (3 seats)
| Party | Candidate | Votes | % | ±% |
|---|---|---|---|---|
| Liberal Democrats | Monica Weller* | 1,408 | 64.5 | N/A |
| Liberal Democrats | Roger Adams* | 1,390 | 63.6 | N/A |
| Liberal Democrats | Christine Miller | 1,256 | 57.5 | N/A |
| Conservative | Toby Cracknell | 725 | 33.2 | N/A |
| Conservative | Richard Moyse | 664 | 30.4 | N/A |
| Conservative | Dina Zharova-Berbner | 564 | 25.8 | N/A |
| Green | Eugene Suggett | 268 | 12.3 | N/A |
| Turnout | | 2,184 | 44.4 | N/A |
| Liberal Democrats win (new seat) | | | | |
| Liberal Democrats win (new seat) | | | | |
| Liberal Democrats win (new seat) | | | | |

=== Brockham, Betchworth, Buckland, Box Hill & Headley ===
Brockham, Betchworth, Buckland, Box Hill & Headley (3 seats)
| Party | Candidate | Votes | % | ±% |
|---|---|---|---|---|
| Liberal Democrats | Paul Potter* | 1,217 | 53.2 | N/A |
| Conservative | Simon Budd* | 1,139 | 49.8 | N/A |
| Liberal Democrats | Paula Keay | 1,089 | 47.6 | N/A |
| Liberal Democrats | Bradley Nelson | 868 | 37.9 | N/A |
| Conservative | Radia Kesseiri Austin | 645 | 28.2 | N/A |
| Conservative | Celia Tiley | 576 | 25.2 | N/A |
| Green | Penny Green | 285 | 12.5 | N/A |
| Labour | Noel Humphrey | 168 | 7.3 | N/A |
| Turnout | | 2,289 | 44.4 | N/A |
| Liberal Democrats win (new seat) | | | | |
| Conservative win (new seat) | | | | |
| Liberal Democrats win (new seat) | | | | |

=== Capel, Leigh, Newdigate & Charlwood ===
Capel, Leigh, Newdigate & Charlwood (3 seats)
| Party | Candidate | Votes | % | ±% |
|---|---|---|---|---|
| Liberal Democrats | Lesley Bushnell* | 894 | 42.6 | N/A |
| Liberal Democrats | Jo Farrar-Astrop | 810 | 38.6 | N/A |
| Liberal Democrats | Alcia Loach | 720 | 34.3 | N/A |
| Conservative | Corinna Osborne-Patterson | 698 | 33.2 | N/A |
| Conservative | Tom Baldwin | 620 | 29.5 | N/A |
| Conservative | Mark Saunders | 619 | 29.5 | N/A |
| Green | Lisa Scott* | 604 | 28.7 | N/A |
| Green | Roger Abbott | 438 | 20.8 | N/A |
| Green | Ken Hollis | 409 | 19.5 | N/A |
| Labour Co-op | Laurence Nasskau | 64 | 3.0 | N/A |
| Turnout | | 2,101 | 40.0 | N/A |
| Liberal Democrats win (new seat) | | | | |
| Liberal Democrats win (new seat) | | | | |
| Liberal Democrats win (new seat) | | | | |

=== Dorking North ===
Dorking North (3 seats)
| Party | Candidate | Votes | % | ±% |
|---|---|---|---|---|
| Liberal Democrats | Hazel Watson* | 1,301 | 54.0 | N/A |
| Liberal Democrats | David Draper* | 1,207 | 50.1 | N/A |
| Liberal Democrats | Elsie Rosam* | 1,082 | 44.9 | N/A |
| Green | Chris Crook | 778 | 32.3 | N/A |
| Green | Pat Smith | 642 | 26.7 | N/A |
| Green | Sarah Weston Holland | 627 | 26.0 | N/A |
| Labour | Clare Mansfield | 339 | 14.1 | N/A |
| Conservative | Michael Foulston | 316 | 13.1 | N/A |
| Conservative | Peter Cude | 264 | 11.0 | N/A |
| Conservative | Stephen Frost | 257 | 10.7 | N/A |
| Turnout | | 2,409 | 44.1 | N/A |
| Liberal Democrats win (new seat) | | | | |
| Liberal Democrats win (new seat) | | | | |
| Liberal Democrats win (new seat) | | | | |

=== Dorking South ===
Dorking South (3 seats)
| Party | Candidate | Votes | % | ±% |
|---|---|---|---|---|
| Liberal Democrats | Margaret Cooksey* | 1,301 | 60.2 | N/A |
| Liberal Democrats | Stephen Cooksey* | 1,219 | 56.4 | N/A |
| Liberal Democrats | Nick Wright* | 1,185 | 54.8 | N/A |
| Green | Molly Crook | 445 | 20.6 | N/A |
| Conservative | Roger Jones | 413 | 19.1 | N/A |
| Green | Lucy Barford | 395 | 18.3 | N/A |
| Conservative | Beccy Gunn | 386 | 17.9 | N/A |
| Conservative | Lucinda Sharpe | 384 | 17.8 | N/A |
| Green | Gerard Bolton | 368 | 17.0 | N/A |
| Turnout | | 2,161 | 38.2 | N/A |
| Liberal Democrats win (new seat) | | | | |
| Liberal Democrats win (new seat) | | | | |
| Liberal Democrats win (new seat) | | | | |

=== Fetcham ===
Fetcham (3 seats)
| Party | Candidate | Votes | % | ±% |
|---|---|---|---|---|
| Liberal Democrats | Raj Haque* | 1,426 | 58.8 | N/A |
| Liberal Democrats | Phil Hammond | 1,402 | 57.8 | N/A |
| Liberal Democrats | Caroline Joseph | 1,311 | 54.0 | N/A |
| Conservative | Simon Chambers | 853 | 35.1 | N/A |
| Conservative | Paul Austin | 755 | 31.1 | N/A |
| Conservative | David McCorquodale | 617 | 25.4 | N/A |
| Green | Janet Crook | 219 | 9.0 | N/A |
| Green | Dan Creber | 159 | 6.6 | N/A |
| Labour | Beatrice Heath | 151 | 6.2 | N/A |
| Turnout | | 2,427 | 43.9 | N/A |
| Liberal Democrats win (new seat) | | | | |
| Liberal Democrats win (new seat) | | | | |
| Liberal Democrats win (new seat) | | | | |

=== Holmwoods & Beare Green ===
Holmwoods & Beare Green (3 seats)
| Party | Candidate | Votes | % | ±% |
|---|---|---|---|---|
| Liberal Democrats | Rosemary Hobbs* | 979 | 54.2 | N/A |
| Liberal Democrats | Claire Malcomson* | 879 | 48.7 | N/A |
| Liberal Democrats | Clayton Wellman* | 782 | 43.3 | N/A |
| Conservative | Leslie Maruziva | 607 | 33.6 | N/A |
| Conservative | Lucy Botting | 546 | 30.2 | N/A |
| Conservative | David Mir | 524 | 29.0 | N/A |
| Green | John Roche | 224 | 12.4 | N/A |
| Green | Emily Auckland | 198 | 11.0 | N/A |
| Green | Fiona Case | 162 | 9.0 | N/A |
| Labour | Christine Foster | 158 | 8.7 | N/A |
| Turnout | | 1,806 | 36.8 | N/A |
| Liberal Democrats win (new seat) | | | | |
| Liberal Democrats win (new seat) | | | | |
| Liberal Democrats win (new seat) | | | | |

=== Leatherhead North ===
Leatherhead North (3 seats)
| Party | Candidate | Votes | % | ±% |
|---|---|---|---|---|
| Liberal Democrats | Keira Vyvyan-Robinson* | 689 | 56.6 | N/A |
| Liberal Democrats | Ben Wall | 661 | 54.3 | N/A |
| Liberal Democrats | Benjamin Wear | 624 | 51.3 | N/A |
| Conservative | Aaron Gibbs | 368 | 30.2 | N/A |
| Conservative | Alan Gibbs | 330 | 27.1 | N/A |
| Conservative | Mushud Ali | 302 | 24.8 | N/A |
| Green | Sally Stewart | 267 | 21.9 | N/A |
| Turnout | | 1,217 | 27.2 | N/A |
| Liberal Democrats win (new seat) | | | | |
| Liberal Democrats win (new seat) | | | | |
| Liberal Democrats win (new seat) | | | | |

=== Leatherhead South ===
Leatherhead South (3 seats)
| Party | Candidate | Votes | % | ±% |
|---|---|---|---|---|
| Liberal Democrats | Bridget Kendrick* | 960 | 49.5 | N/A |
| Conservative | Joanna Slater* | 852 | 43.9 | N/A |
| Conservative | James Chambers* | 831 | 42.8 | N/A |
| Liberal Democrats | Gareth Parsons | 779 | 40.2 | N/A |
| Conservative | Henry Elcock-Haskins | 754 | 38.9 | N/A |
| Liberal Democrats | Nick O'Shea | 700 | 36.1 | N/A |
| Green | Melissa Awcock | 301 | 15.5 | N/A |
| Labour Co-op | Ann Clark | 207 | 10.7 | N/A |
| Green | Jo Sherring | 151 | 7.8 | N/A |
| Turnout | | 1,940 | 44.0 | N/A |
| Liberal Democrats win (new seat) | | | | |
| Conservative win (new seat) | | | | |
| Conservative win (new seat) | | | | |

=== Mickleham, Westcott & Okewood ===
Mickleham, Westcott & Okewood (3 seats)
| Party | Candidate | Votes | % | ±% |
|---|---|---|---|---|
| Liberal Democrats | Chris Budleigh | 1,180 | 53.9 | N/A |
| Liberal Democrats | Abhiram Magesh | 1,108 | 50.6 | N/A |
| Liberal Democrats | Leah Mursaleen-Plank | 1,106 | 50.5 | N/A |
| Conservative | Michael Hebberd | 769 | 35.1 | N/A |
| Conservative | Duncan Irvine | 703 | 32.1 | N/A |
| Conservative | Gavin Musgrave | 684 | 31.2 | N/A |
| Green | James Poke | 372 | 17.0 | N/A |
| Green | David Szachno-Hodgkinson | 260 | 11.9 | N/A |
| Turnout | | 2,191 | 42.6 | N/A |
| Liberal Democrats win (new seat) | | | | |
| Liberal Democrats win (new seat) | | | | |
| Liberal Democrats win (new seat) | | | | |
