= 2023 Preston City Council election =

2023 English local election

← 2022	4 May 2023	2024 →

17 of 48 seats on Preston City Council 25 seats needed for a majority

	First party	Second party
Leader	Matthew Brown	Susan Whittam
Party	Labour	Conservative
Seats before	29	11 (Note: Including one vacancy in Preston Rural East ward previously held by Conservative councillor Graham Joliffe prior to his resignation in March 2023.)
Seats won	11	3
Seats after	31	10
	Third party	Fourth party
Leader	John Potter
Party	Liberal Democrats	Independent
Seats before	7	1
Seats won	3	0
Seats after	7	0
- Winner of each seat at the 2023 Preston City Council election
Leader before election
Matthew Brown
Labour
Leader after election
Matthew Brown
Labour

The 2023 Preston City Council election took place on 4 May 2023, to elect 17 members of Preston City Council in Lancashire, England, being the usual third of the council plus a by-election in Preston Rural East ward.

Labour retained its majority on the council.

== Results summary ==
2023 Preston City Council election
Party	This election			Full council			This election		
Party	Seats	Net	Seats %	Other	Total	Total %	Votes	Votes %	+/−
Labour	11	▲1	64.7	20	31	64.6	14,616	52.4	
Conservative	3	▼1	17.6	7	10	20.8	7,942	28.5	
Liberal Democrats	3	Steady	17.6	4	7	14.6	7,134	25.6	+3.5
Green	0	Steady	0.0	0	0	0.0	123	0.4	-0.2

== Ward results ==
The results for each ward were as follows:

=== Ashton ===
Ashton
Party	Candidate	Votes	%	±%
Labour	Elizabeth Atkins	1,114	62.8	−1.8
Conservative	Tes Slater	374	21.2	−4.1
Liberal Democrats	Jeremy Dable	208	11.7	+2.2
ADF	David Brooks	68	3.8	N/A
Majority		740	41.6	+2.3
Turnout		1,774	27.8	−3.2
Labour hold		Swing	-1.15	

=== Brookfield ===
Brookfield
Party	Candidate	Votes	%	±%
Labour	Naoimh McMahon	817	71.6	+10.2
Conservative	Kevin Brockbank	218	19.1	−3.9
Liberal Democrats	Edward Craven	99	8.7	−2.0
Majority		599	52.5	+14.1
Turnout		1141	20.13	−0.76
Labour hold		Swing	7.05	

=== Cadley ===
Cadley
Party	Candidate	Votes	%	±%
Liberal Democrats	John Potter	1,103	55.5	+4.9
Labour	Cirenia Navarro	544	27.4	+1.7
Conservative	Daniel Nuttall	337	17.0	−6.7
Majority		559	28.1	+3.2
Turnout		1,988	31.7	−2.9
Liberal Democrats hold		Swing	+1.6	

=== City Centre ===
City Centre
Party	Candidate	Votes	%	±%
Labour	Carol Henshaw	1,035	66.5	−4.7
Conservative	Andy Pratt	241	15.5	−4.5
Liberal Democrats	Mike Peak	146	9.4	+0.6
Green	Dan Thompson	123	7.9	New
Majority		794	51.0	−0.2
Turnout		1,557	19.4	+1.7
Labour hold		Swing	-0.1	

=== Deepdale ===
Deepdale
Party	Candidate	Votes	%	±%
Labour	Samir Vohra	1,470	86.3	−3.3
Liberal Democrats	Rebecca Potter	112	6.6	+1.9
Conservative	Nilli Williamson	104	6.1	+0.5
Majority		1358	79.9	−4.3
Turnout		1703	26.7	−2.55
Labour hold		Swing	-2.15	

=== Fishwick and Frenchwood ===
Fishwick and Frenchwood
Party	Candidate	Votes	%	±%
Labour	Yakub Patel	1,165	71.8	−8.6
Conservative	Ishaq Vaez	365	22.5	+8.8
Liberal Democrats	Jurgan Voges	92	5.7	−0.2
Majority		800	49.0	−17.8
Turnout		1,632	27.6	−1.7
Labour hold		Swing	-8.9	

=== Garrison ===
Garrison
Party	Candidate	Votes	%	±%
Labour	Freddie Bailey	1,363	61.6	+6.1
Conservative	Adam Bhailok	502	22.7	−5.3
Liberal Democrats	Claire Craven	334	15.1	−1.4
Majority		861	38.9	+11.4
Turnout		2,213	33.46	—1.5
Labour hold		Swing	+5.7	

=== Greyfriars ===
Greyfriars
Party	Candidate	Votes	%	±%
Liberal Democrats	Tony Raisbeck	1,128	48.4	+2.9
Conservative	Chris Hamilton	613	26.3	−5.2
Labour	Mark Routledge	572	25.0	+3.0
Majority		515	22.1	7.1
Turnout		2332	37.2	−4.1
Liberal Democrats hold		Swing	+4.05	

=== Ingol and Cottam ===
Ingol and Cottom
Party	Candidate	Votes	%	±%
Liberal Democrats	John Rutter	981	48.7	−6.6
Conservative	Carolyn Gibson	626	31.0	+1.1
Labour	Taylor Donoughue-Smith	389	19.3	+4.4
Majority		355	17.7	−7.7
Turnout		2014	28.3	−6.0
Liberal Democrats hold		Swing	-3.85	

=== Lea and Larches ===
Lea and Larches
Party	Candidate	Votes	%	±%
Labour	Phil Crowe	896	64.2	+5.0
Liberal Democrats	Mark Jewell	281	20.1	+8.4
Conservative	Monwara Amin	199	14.3	−14.7
Majority		615	44.1	+13.9
Turnout		1,395	21.85	−3.95
Labour hold		Swing	+9.85	

=== Plungington ===
Plungington
Party	Candidate	Votes	%	±%
Labour	Matthew Brown	896	76.1	+5.4
Conservative	Pamela Homer	172	14.6	−3.4
Liberal Democrats	Peter Johnstone	98	8.3	−3.0
Majority		724	61.5	+8.8
Turnout		1,178	15.5	+1.7
Labour hold		Swing	+4.4	

=== Preston Rural East ===
Preston Rural East
Party	Candidate	Votes	%	±%
Conservative	Harry Landless	1,164	51.3	−13.0
Conservative	Mark Bell	1,150	50.7	−14.3
Labour	Victoria Blundall	663	29.2	+11.9
Labour	Andrew Maclaren	616	27.2	+7.2
Liberal Democrats	Joanna Joyner	416	18.4	+2.8
Liberal Democrats	Benjamin Noble	327	14.4	+5.3
Majority		501	22.1	−8.8
Turnout		2267	32.02	−0.5
Conservative hold		Swing		
Conservative hold		Swing		

- Compared with last time seat up for election. The vote share for Landless is compared to 2019, while Bell’s is compared to 2021 when the seat was last contested.

=== Preston Rural North ===
Preston Rural North
Party	Candidate	Votes	%	±%
Conservative	Sue Whittam	848	43.6	−12.4
Liberal Democrats	Daniel Guise	744	38.2	+19.0
Labour	Adam Sarwar	382	19.6	−5.2
Majority		104	5.4	−25.8
Turnout		1947	31.2	+1.1
Conservative hold		Swing	-15.7	

=== Ribbleton ===
Ribbleton
Party	Candidate	Votes	%	±%
Labour	Pat Varty	725	72.9	+9.1
Conservative	Frankie Kennedy	251	17.8	−6.3
Liberal Democrats	Kathyrn Bosman	92	9.3	−2.7
Majority		548	55.1	+15.4
Turnout		1004	17.7	−0.7
Labour hold		Swing	+7.7	

=== Sharoe Green ===
Sharoe Green
Party	Candidate	Votes	%	±%
Labour	Connor Dwyer	996	39.4	+9.8
Liberal Democrats	George Kulbacki	878	34.7	+8.5
Conservative	Daniel Duckworth	644	25.5	−11.1
Majority		118	4.7	
Turnout		2530	40.6	+3.1
Labour gain from Conservative		Swing	10.45	

=== St. Matthew's ===
St Matthew’s
Party	Candidate	Votes	%	±%
Labour	Javed Iqbal	973	80.4	−1.3
Conservative	Colin Homer	134	11.1	−1.0
Liberal Democrats	Peter Lawrence	95	7.9	+1.8
Majority		839	69.3	−0.3
Turnout		1,210	20.77	+0.27
Labour hold		Swing	-0.15	
