= 2022 Preston City Council election =

2022 UK local government election

Results by ward

The 2022 Preston City Council election took place on 5 May 2022 to elect members of Preston City Council. which happened on the same day as other local elections.

Council elections for the Preston City Council were previously held in 2021 as part of the 2021 United Kingdom local elections. The council underwent a wholesale boundary revision in 2020, reducing the number of both Councillors and electoral wards, resulting in the first 'all out' election since 2002 Preston Council election.

All locally registered electors (British, Irish, Commonwealth and European Union citizens) who are aged 18 or over on polling day are entitled to vote in the local elections.

== Council composition ==
Prior to the election the composition of the council is:

- Labour Party: 28
- Conservative Party: 11
- Liberal Democrats: 7
- Independent: 1
- Vacant: 1

== Results summary ==
2022 Preston City Council election
Party	This election			Full council			This election		
Party	Seats	Net	Seats %	Other	Total	Total %	Votes	Votes %	+/−
Labour	11	Steady	64.7	19	30	62.5	13,890	48.4	+5.9
Conservative	3	Steady	17.6	8	11	22.9	8,089	28.2	-6.4
Liberal Democrats	3	Steady	17.6	4	7	14.6	6,360	22.1	+8.0
Green	0	Steady	0.0	0	0	0.0	178	0.6	-4.0

== Ward results ==
=== Ashton ===
Ashton
Party	Candidate	Votes	%	±%
Labour	Robert Boswell	1,249	64.6	+26.7
Conservative	Tracy Slater	490	25.3	+6.1
Liberal Democrats	Jeremy Dable	208	9.5	+5.5
Majority		740	39.3	+33.7
Turnout		1,934	31	−5.2
Labour hold		Swing	+10.3	

=== Brookfield ===
Brookfield
Party	Candidate	Votes	%	±%
Labour	Mel Close	793	67.3	+7.1
Labour	Naoimh McMahon	723	61.4	+1.2
Conservative	Mary Kudi	272	23.0	−11.2
Conservative	Bowen Perryman	258	21.9	−12.3
Liberal Democrats	Sandra Finch	126	10.7	+5.1
Liberal Democrats	Christina Mylroie	88	7.5	+1.9
Majority				
Turnout		1178	20.89	−1.8
Labour hold		Swing		
Labour hold		Swing		

=== Cadley ===
Cadley
Party	Candidate	Votes	%	±%
Liberal Democrats	Phoenix Adair	1,069	50.6	+12.4
Labour	Takhsin Akhtar	542	25.7	+0.4
Conservative	Paul Balshaw	500	23.7	−8.7
Majority		527	24.9	+19.1
Turnout		2111	34.6	−1.9
Liberal Democrats hold		Swing	+9.6	

=== City Centre ===
City Centre
Party	Candidate	Votes	%	±%
Labour	Lynne Brooks	1,099	71.2	+13.2
Conservative	Andy Pratt	308	20.0	−2.2
Liberal Democrats	Christopher Finch	136	8.8	+1.4
Majority		791	51.2	+15.4
Turnout		1,543	17.7	−3.3
Labour hold		Swing	+7.7	

=== Deepdale ===
Deepdale
Party	Candidate	Votes	%	±%
Labour	Zafar Coupland	1,664	89.6	+7.2
Conservative	Nilli Williamson	104	5.6	−4.9
Liberal Democrats	Jurgan Voges	87	4.7	−2.8
Majority		1560	84.0	12.1
Turnout		1857	29.2	+0.02
Labour hold		Swing	+6.1	

=== Fishwick and Frenchwood ===
Fishwick and Frenchwood
Party	Candidate	Votes	%	±%
Labour	Valerie Wise	1,375	80.4	+0.8
Conservative	Ishaq Vaez	235	13.7	−0.5
Liberal Democrats	John David Rutter	101	5.9	−0.2
Majority		1140	66.7	+1.3
Turnout		1711	29.3	+1.4
Labour hold		Swing	+0.7	

=== Garrison ===
Garrison
Party	Candidate	Votes	%	±%
Labour	Amber Afzal	1,218	55.5	+3.3
Conservative	Lakwinder Singh	614	28.0	−10.4
Liberal Democrats	Mike Turner	361	16.5	+6.1
Majority		604	27.5	+13.7
Turnout		2194	33.6	−2.5
Labour hold		Swing	+6.9	

=== Greyfriars ===
Greyfriars
Party	Candidate	Votes	%	±%
Liberal Democrats	Fiona Duke	1,206	46.5	+15.1
Conservative	Geoffrey Aldridge	817	31.5	−9.5
Labour	Mark Routledge	572	22.0	+0.4
Majority		389	15.0	N/A
Turnout		2596	41.3	−0.8
Liberal Democrats hold		Swing	+12.3	

=== Ingol and Cottam ===
Ingol and Cottom
Party	Candidate	Votes	%	±%
Liberal Democrats	Neil Darby	1,283	55.3	+18.9
Conservative	Carolyn Gibson	694	29.9	−14.5
Labour	Connor Dwyer	346	14.9	−4.3
Majority		589	+25.4	N/A
Turnout		2322	34.3	+1.4
Liberal Democrats hold		Swing	+16.7	

=== Lea and Larches ===
Lea and Larches
Party	Candidate	Votes	%	±%
Labour	David Borrow	961	59.2	+20.5
Conservative	Scott Paul Rainford	472	29.0	+3.7
Liberal Democrats	Edward Craven	190	11.7	+2.2
Majority		489	30.2	+16.7
Turnout		1624	25.8	−1.6
Labour hold		Swing	+8.4	

=== Plungington ===
Plungington
Party	Candidate	Votes	%	±%
Labour	Pav Akhtar	814	70.7	+7.6
Conservative	Pamela Homer	207	18.0	−4.5
Liberal Democrats	Rebecca Potter	136	11.3	+5.5
Majority		607	52.7	+12.1
Turnout		1,151	13.8	−3.8
Labour hold		Swing	+6.1	

=== Preston Rural East ===
Preston Rural East
Party	Candidate	Votes	%	±%
Conservative	Stephen Whittam	1,188	57.0	−8.1
Labour	James Ahmed	543	26.1	+6.1
Liberal Democrats	Peter Lawrence	351	16.8	+10.1
Majority		645	30.9	−14.2
Turnout		2084	32.5	−5.2
Conservative hold		Swing	-7.1	

=== Preston Rural North ===
Preston Rural North
Party	Candidate	Votes	%	±%
Conservative	Stephen Thompson	941	56.0	−10.1
Labour	Adam Sarwar	417	24.8	+2.5
Liberal Democrats	Daniel Guise	323	19.2	+7.6
Majority		524	31.2	−13.6
Turnout		1700	30.1	−5.5
Conservative hold		Swing	-6.3	

=== Ribbleton ===
Ribbleton
Party	Candidate	Votes	%	±%
Labour	Jonathan Saksena	664	63.8	+6.6
Conservative	Jonty Campbell	251	24.1	+4.1
Liberal Democrats	Luke Bosman	125	12.0	+8.6
Majority		413	39.7	+2.5
Turnout		1040	18.4	−1.8
Labour hold		Swing	+1.3	

=== Sharoe Green ===
Sharoe Green
Party	Candidate	Votes	%	±%
Conservative	Maxwell Green	853	36.6	−12.6
Labour	Samir Vohra	690	29.6	+4.3
Liberal Democrats	George Kulbacki	611	26.2	+10.3
Green	Helen Disley	178	7.6	+0.02
Majority		163	7.0	−16.9
Turnout		2332	37.5	−1.6
Conservative hold		Swing	-8.5	

=== St. Matthew's ===
St Matthew’s
Party	Candidate	Votes	%	±%
Labour	Jade Morgan	963	81.7	+6.4
Conservative	Colin Homer	143	12.1	−4.9
Liberal Democrats	Joanne Joyner	72	6.1	−1.6
Majority		820	69.6	+11.3
Turnout		1178	20.5	−2.1
Labour hold		Swing	+5.7	
