= Harlow District Council elections =

Local government elections in Essex, England

One third of Harlow District Council in Essex, England, is elected each year, followed by one year when there is an election to Essex County Council instead. Since the last boundary changes in 2002, 33 councillors have been elected from 11 wards.

== Council elections ==
Summary of the council composition, click on the year for full details of each election. Boundary changes took place for the 2002 election reducing the number of seats by 9.

Year	Labour	Conservative	Liberal Democrats (Note: Includes totals for the predecessors of the Liberal Democrats, the Liberal Party and SDP (both of which participated in the Alliance).)	Reform	UKIP	Independents & Others	Council control after election
Local government reorganisation; council established (42 seats)
1973	38	0	4	–	–	0	Labour
New ward boundaries
1976	35	3	4	–	–	0	Labour
1978	35	3	4	–	–	0	Labour
1979	35	6	1	–	–	0	Labour
1980	33	7	2	–	–	0	Labour
1982	34	3	5	–	–	0	Labour
1983	34	3	4	–	–	1	Labour
1984	33	4	5	–	–	0	Labour
1986	36	2	4	–	–	0	Labour
1987	37	2	3	–	–	0	Labour
1988	35	4	3	–	–	0	Labour
1990	35	4	3	–	–	0	Labour
1991	33	6	3	–	–	0	Labour
1992	32	7	3	–	–	1 (Note: 1 vacant seat)	Labour
1994	33	6	3	–	0	0	Labour
1995	37	2	3	–	0	0	Labour
1996	39	0	3	–	0	0	Labour
1998	38	1	3	–	0	0	Labour
1999	34	4	4	–	0	0	Labour
2000	26	8	8	–	0	0	Labour
New ward boundaries; sears decreased from 42 to 33
2002	9	12	12	–	0	0	No overall control
2003	9	12	12	–	0	0	No overall control
2004	11	13	9	–	0	0	No overall control
2006	13	12	8	–	0	0	No overall control
2007	12	12	8	–	0	1	No overall control
2008	6	19	8	–	0	0	Conservative
2010	10	18	5	–	0	0	Conservative
2011	14	17	2	–	0	0	Conservative
2012	20	13	0	–	0	0	Labour
2014	17	11	0	–	5	0	Labour
2015	19	12	0	–	2	0	Labour
2016	19	12	0	–	2	0	Labour
2018	20	13	0	–	0	0	Labour
2019	20	13	0	–	0	0	Labour
2021	12	20	0	0	0	1 (Note: 1 vacant seat)	Conservative
2022	10	22	0	0	0	0	Conservative
2023	12	21	0	0	0	0	Conservative
New ward boundaries
2024	16	17	0	0	0	0	Conservative
2026	10	22	0	1	0	0	Conservative

== District result maps ==
1976 results map

1978 results map

1979 results map

1980 results map

1982 results map

1983 results map

1984 results map

1986 results map

1987 results map

1988 results map

1990 results map

1991 results map

1992 results map

1994 results map

1995 results map

1996 results map

1998 results map

1999 results map

2000 results map

2002 results map

2003 results map

2004 results map

2006 results map

2007 results map

2008 results map

2010 results map

2011 results map

2012 results map

2014 results map

2015 results map

2016 results map

2018 results map

2019 results map

2021 results map

2022 results map

2023 results map

2024 results map

2026 results map

== By-election results ==
By-elections occur when seats become vacant between council elections. Below is a summary of recent by-elections; full by-election results can be found by clicking on the by-election name.

By-election	Date	Incumbent party	Winning party
Great Parndon by-election	25 September 1997	Labour	Labour
Latton Bush by-election	25 September 1997	Labour	Labour
Mark Hall South by-election	25 September 1997	Labour	Labour
Little Parndon by-election	7 June 2001	Labour	Labour
Little Parndon and Hare Street by-election	25 October 2007	Labour	Labour
Toddbrook by-election	25 October 2007	Labour	Conservative
Staple Tye by-election	30 April 2009	Conservative	Liberal Democrats
Toddbrook by-election	15 November 2012	Labour	Labour
Mark Hall by-election	12 February 2015	UKIP	Labour
Toddbrook by-election	28 September 2017	Labour	Labour
Little Parndon and Hare Street by-election	8 March 2018	Labour	Labour
Bush Fair by-election	8 November 2018	Labour	Labour
Nettleswell by-election	8 November 2018	Labour	Labour
Toddbrook by-election	13 December 2018	Labour	Labour
Mark Hall by-election	8 July 2021	Labour	Conservative
Bush Fair by-election	23 June 2022	Conservative	Labour Co-op
Little Parndon and Town Centre by-election	10 October 2024	Labour	Labour
Mark Hall by-election	1 May 2025	Labour	Reform
