= 2024 Harlow District Council election =

Local election in Harlow, England

- 2 May 2024

All 33 seats to Harlow District Council 17 seats needed for a majority

	First party	Second party
Leader	Dan Swords	Chris Vince
Party	Conservative	Labour
Last election	21 seats, 41.5%	12 seats, 43.8%
Seats before	21	12
Seats won	17	16
Seat change	▼4	▲4
Popular vote	21,900	21,928
Percentage	43.8%	43.8%
Swing	▲2.3%	0.0%
- Winner of each seat at the 2024 Harlow District Council election
Leader before election
Dan Swords
Conservative
Leader after election
Dan Swords
Conservative

The 2024 Harlow District Council election was held on Thursday 2 May 2024, alongside the other local elections in the United Kingdom being held on the same day. All 33 members of Harlow District Council in Essex were elected following boundary changes.

The Conservatives retained their majority on the council, but lost four seats to Labour, reducing the Conservative majority to just one seat.

== Background ==
Historically, Harlow was a Labour council. Labour held a majority on the council from its creation until 2002, when the district fell into no overall control. The Conservatives held a majority for the first time following the 2008 election, but Labour retook control in 2012.

The Conservative won a majority on the council in 2021, and have governed as a majority since then. In the most recent election, the Conservatives gained 1 seat with 41.5% of the vote, and Labour lost 1 seat with 43.8%.

In the build up to the May 2024 election, Conservative candidate James Leppard was suspended from the party pending investigation, following a Hope Not Hate allegation of Islamophobia. He remained listed as a Conservative on the ballot paper, and he was re-elected. His suspension from the party was lifted a few weeks after the election, after an investigation concluded that his comments which had triggered the complaint had been selectively edited and taken out of context.

== Boundary changes ==
Harlow usually elects its councillors in thirds, on a 4-year cycle. However, following boundary changes, all councillors will be elected to the new wards. All wards have 3 councillors.

Old wards	New wards
Bush Fair	Bush Fair
Church Langley	Church Langley North and Newhall
Great Parndon	Church Langley South and Potter Street
Harlow Common	Great Parndon
Little Parndon and Hare Street	Latton Bush and Stewards
Mark Hall	Little Parndon and Town Centre
Netteswell	Mark Hall
Old Harlow	Netteswell
Staple Tye	Old Harlow
Sumners and Kingsmoor	Passmores
Toddbrook	Sumners and Kingsmoor

== Summary ==
The Conservatives lost four seats, but retained a one-seat majority over Labour.

=== Council composition ===
After 2023 election		Before 2024 election		After 2024 election	
Party	Seats	Party	Seats	Party	Seats
Conservative	21	Conservative	21	Conservative	17
Labour	12	Labour	12	Labour	16

=== Election result ===
2024 Harlow District Council election
Party	Candidates	Seats	Gains	Losses	Net gain/loss	Seats %	Votes %	Votes	+/−
Conservative	33	17	0	0	▼4	51.5	43.8	21,900	+2.3
Labour	33	16	0	0	▲4	48.5	43.8	21,928	±0.0
Green	24	0	0	0	Steady	0.0	8.6	4,314	–0.9
Harlow Alliance	4	0	0	0	Steady	0.0	2.0	993	–0.8
Liberal Democrats	3	0	0	0	Steady	0.0	0.7	351	–0.8
UKIP	2	0	0	0	Steady	0.0	0.6	325	N/A
Independent	1	0	0	0	Steady	0.0	0.3	141	N/A
TUSC	1	0	0	0	Steady	0.0	0.1	55	–0.2

== Ward results ==
Statement of Persons Nominated:

=== Bush Fair ===
Bush Fair (3 seats)
Party	Candidate	Votes	%	±%
Labour Co-op	Jodi Dunne*	778	43.0	
Labour Co-op	Kay Morrison*	769	42.5	
Labour Co-op	Mark Ingall	737	40.7	
Conservative	Colleen Morrison	589	32.5	
Conservative	Nidhi Hindocha	575	31.8	
Conservative	Brian Kasule	550	30.4	
Green	Hannah Bolton	177	9.8	
Green	David Margetts	175	9.7	
Green	Jennifer Steadman	175	9.7	
UKIP	Daniel Long	141	7.8	
Liberal Democrats	William Tennison	89	4.9	
Turnout		1,811	28.3	
Registered electors		6,397		
Labour Co-op hold				
Labour Co-op hold				
Labour Co-op gain from Conservative				

=== Church Langley North & Newhall ===
Church Langley North & Newhall (3 seats)
Party	Candidate	Votes	%	±%
Conservative	Andrew Johnson*	831	62.8	
Conservative	Dan Swords*	798	58.9	
Conservative	Michael Hardware*	779	60.3	
Labour	Edna Stevens	437	33.0	
Labour	Simon O'Dell	418	31.6	
Labour	John Solomon	384	29.0	
Green	Michelle Margetts	185	14.0	
Green	Bengeman White	136	10.3	
Turnout		1,453	27.3	
Registered electors		5,318		
Conservative win (new seat)				
Conservative win (new seat)				
Conservative win (new seat)				

=== Church Langley South & Potter Street ===
Church Langley South & Potter Street (3 seats)
Party	Candidate	Votes	%	±%
Conservative	Nicky Purse*	939	61.7	
Conservative	Danielle Brown*	890	58.4	
Conservative	James Leppard*	826	54.2	
Labour	Christine Gallacher	568	37.3	
Labour	Emma Mullard-Toal	513	33.7	
Labour	Jeff Mace	505	33.2	
Green	Tina Richardson	187	12.3	
Independent	Gary Roberts	141	9.3	
Turnout		1,773	26.6	
Registered electors		6,669		
Conservative win (new seat)				
Conservative win (new seat)				
Conservative win (new seat)				

=== Great Parndon ===
Great Parndon (3 seats)
Party	Candidate	Votes	%	±%
Conservative	David Carter*	932	59.4	
Conservative	Hannah Ellis	825	52.6	
Conservative	Matthew Saggers*	791	50.4	
Labour	Rosie Jackson	581	37.0	
Labour	Allan Jolley	527	33.6	
Labour	Harry Tennison	490	31.2	
Harlow Alliance	Nicholas Taylor	289	18.4	
Green	Vicki O'Brien	149	9.5	
Green	Liz Pike	121	7.7	
Turnout		1,711	30.6	
Registered electors		5,601		
Conservative hold				
Conservative hold				
Conservative hold				

=== Latton Bush & Stewards ===
Latton Bush & Stewards (3 seats)
Party	Candidate	Votes	%	±%
Labour	Luke Howard	890	47.1	
Conservative	Alastair Gunn*	881	46.6	
Conservative	Stacy Seales	859	45.4	
Conservative	John Steer*	836	44.2	
Labour	Phil Waite	805	42.6	
Labour	Peiyee O'Dell	781	41.3	
Harlow Alliance	Karen James	221	11.7	
Green	Tina Higginson	215	11.4	
Green	Jack Margetts	183	9.7	
Turnout		2,100	30.8	
Registered electors		6,815		
Labour win (new seat)				
Conservative win (new seat)				
Conservative win (new seat)				

=== Little Parndon & Town Centre ===
Little Parndon & Town Centre (3 seats)
Party	Candidate	Votes	%	±%
Labour	Chris Vince*	761	62.7	
Labour	Tony Durcan*	710	58.5	
Labour	Maggie Hulcoop*	671	55.3	
Conservative	Dan Brown	388	32.0	
Conservative	Geoffrey Longster	349	28.8	
Conservative	Anne Richards	332	27.4	
Green	Klara Bow	187	15.4	
Green	Caroline Schellin-Jolley	133	11.0	
Green	Danielle Kemm	108	8.9	
Turnout		1,365	26.1	
Registered electors		5,228		
Labour win (new seat)				
Labour win (new seat)				
Labour win (new seat)				

=== Mark Hall ===
Mark Hall (3 seats)
Party	Candidate	Votes	%	±%
Labour	Michael Houlihan	722	50.3	
Labour	Aiden O'Dell*	685	47.7	
Labour	Lanie Shears*	682	47.5	
Conservative	Simon Carter*	408	28.4	
Green	Julie Taylor	370	23.5	
Conservative	Fahreday Purse	337	22.9	
Conservative	John Purse	329	22.9	
Green	Ernesto Johnson	240	16.7	
Green	Paul King	233	16.2	
UKIP	Mark Gough	184	12.8	
Liberal Democrats	Lesley Rideout	117	8.1	
Turnout		1,571	27.7	
Registered electors		5,679		
Labour gain from Conservative				
Labour hold				
Labour hold				

=== Netteswell ===
Netteswell (3 seats)
Party	Candidate	Votes	%	±%
Labour	James Griggs*	871	67.2	
Labour	Nancy Watson*	710	54.8	
Labour	Stefan Mullard-Toal	705	54.4	
Conservative	Wendy Carter	420	32.4	
Conservative	Elena Hardware	403	31.1	
Conservative	Vic Petch	367	28.3	
Green	Milly Judd	147	11.3	
Liberal Democrats	Robert Thurston	145	11.2	
Green	Adam Margetts	122	9.4	
Turnout		1,432	24.9	
Registered electors		5,749		
Labour hold				
Labour hold				
Labour gain from Conservative				

=== Old Harlow ===
Old Harlow (3 seats)
Party	Candidate	Votes	%	±%
Conservative	Joel Charles*	1,042	58.8	
Conservative	Michael Garnett*	957	54.0	
Conservative	Sue Livings*	943	53.2	
Labour	Michael Danvers	665	37.5	
Labour	Liam Kerrigan	563	31.8	
Labour	Anita Schultschik	559	31.6	
Green	Yasmin Gregory	247	13.9	
Green	Jacklyn Stansfield	168	9.5	
Green	Jacobus Van Der Poel	115	6.5	
TUSC	Paul Lenihan	55	3.1	
Turnout		1,907	30.4	
Registered electors		6,269		
Conservative hold				
Conservative hold				
Conservative hold				

=== Passmores ===
Passmores (3 seats)
Party	Candidate	Votes	%	±%
Labour	Tony Edwards*	799	62.3	
Labour	Daniella Pritchard*	753	58.7	
Labour	Jake Shepherd	748	58.3	
Conservative	Amanda Maison	427	33.3	
Conservative	Michelle Field	422	32.9	
Conservative	Ash Malik	337	26.3	
Harlow Alliance	Steve Barnes	198	15.4	
Green	Gareth Williams	166	12.9	
Turnout		1,439	27.0	
Registered electors		5,339		
Labour win (new seat)				
Labour win (new seat)				
Labour win (new seat)				

=== Sumners & Kingsmoor ===
Sumners & Kingsmoor (3 seats)
Party	Candidate	Votes	%	±%
Conservative	Russel Perrin*	886	49.8	
Conservative	Clive Souter*	864	48.5	
Conservative	Emma Ghaffari	788	44.3	
Labour	Robert Davis	752	42.3	
Labour	Cara Dunne	719	40.4	
Labour	Simon Vincent	670	37.6	
Harlow Alliance	Alan Leverett	285	16.0	
Green	Julie Bull	205	11.5	
Green	Dean Bull	170	9.6	
Turnout		1,909	31.1	
Registered electors		6,135		
Conservative hold				
Conservative hold				
Conservative hold				

== By-elections ==
=== Little Parndon and Town Centre ===
Little Parndon and Town Centre: 10 October 2024
Party	Candidate	Votes	%	±%
Labour	Linda Clark	513	50.3	–6.3
Conservative	Colleen Morrison	227	22.3	–7.0
Reform	Peter Lamb	201	19.7	N/A
Green	Ernesto Johnson	56	5.5	–8.6
UKIP	Mark Gough	23	2.3	N/A
Majority		286	28.0	N/A
Turnout		1,020		
Labour hold		Swing	▲0.4	

=== Mark Hall ===
Mark Hall by-election: 1 May 2025
Party	Candidate	Votes	%	±%
Reform	Paul Jago	505	32.0	N/A
Conservative	John Steer	424	26.8	+2.5
Labour	Anne Gallacher	350	22.7	–24.9
Green	Julie Taylor	223	14.1	+0.7
Liberal Democrats	Lesley Rideout	56	3.5	–2.7
UKIP	Marian Forstner	14	0.9	N/A
Majority		81	5.2	N/A
Turnout		1,577		
Reform gain from Labour				
