= 1996 Harlow District Council election =

English local election

← 1995	2 May 1996	1998 →

16 of the 42 seats to Harlow District Council 22 seats needed for a majority
	First party	Second party
Party	Labour	Liberal Democrats
Last election	37	3
Seats won	15	1
Seats after	39	3
Seat change	▲2	Steady
Popular vote	11,357	3,893
Percentage	66.8%	22.9%
- Map showing the results of contested wards in the 1996 Harlow District Council elections.
Council control before election
Labour
Council control after election
Labour

The 1996 Harlow District Council election took place on 2 May 1996 to elect members of Harlow District Council in Essex, England. This was on the same day as other local elections. The Labour Party retained control of the council, which it had held continuously since the council's creation in 1973.

== Election result ==
1996 Harlow local election result
Party	Seats	Gains	Losses	Net gain/loss	Seats %	Votes %	Votes	+/−
Labour	15	2	0	▲2	93.8	66.8	11,357	▲17.8
Liberal Democrats	1	0	0	Steady	6.3	9.6	1,634	▼2.8
Conservative	0	0	2	▼2	0.0	22.9	3,893	▼15.7
Green	0	0	0	Steady	0.0	0.7	121	New

All comparisons in vote share are to the corresponding 1992 election.

== Ward results ==
=== Brays Grove ===
Location of Brays Grove ward

Brays Grove
Party	Candidate	Votes	%
Labour	John McCree	804	84.5%
Conservative	E. Roberts	147	15.5%
Turnout			32.3%
Labour hold			

=== Great Parndon ===
Location of Great Parndon ward

Great Parndon
Party	Candidate	Votes	%
Labour	Sid Warner	774	58.3%
Conservative	P. McClarnon	554	41.7%
Turnout			42.0%
Labour gain from Conservative			

=== Hare Street and Town Centre ===
Location of Hare Street and Town Centre ward

Hare Street and Town Centre
Party	Candidate	Votes	%
Labour	Terry Abel	590	73.3%
Conservative	V. Roberts	115	14.3%
Liberal Democrats	S. Ward	100	12.4%
Turnout			31.5%
Labour hold			

=== Kingsmoor ===
Location of Kingsmoor ward

Kingsmoor
Party	Candidate	Votes	%
Labour	Ian Turner	807	55.2%
Conservative	D. Roberts	451	30.9%
Liberal Democrats	L. Jones	203	13.9%
Turnout			32.3%
Labour gain from Conservative			

=== Latton Bush (2 seats) ===
Location of Latton Bush ward

Latton Bush (2 seats)
Party	Candidate	Votes	%
Labour	Pauline Bruce	941	
Labour	Alan Jones	834	
Conservative	S. Carter	386	
Conservative	V. Ross	334	
Liberal Democrats	J. Dawson	143	
Liberal Democrats	P. Dawson	121	
Turnout			39.9%
Labour hold			
Labour hold			

=== Little Parndon ===
Location of Little Parndon ward

Little Parndon
Party	Candidate	Votes	%
Labour	Daphne Pennick	1,051	81.3%
Conservative	D. Weales	241	18.7%
Turnout			33.8%
Labour hold			

=== Mark Hall South ===
Location of Mark Hall South ward

Mark Hall South
Party	Candidate	Votes	%
Labour	Mike Danvers	968	81.8%
Conservative	D. Crossingham	215	18.2%
Turnout			32.8%
Labour hold			

=== Netteswell East ===
Location of Netteswell East ward

Netteswell East
Party	Candidate	Votes	%
Labour	Rob Eschle	724	78.4%
Conservative	R. Tweed	199	21.6%
Turnout			33.7%
Labour hold			

=== Netteswell West ===
Location of Netteswell West ward

Netteswell West
Party	Candidate	Votes	%
Labour	Jean Clark	602	75.3%
Liberal Democrats	S. Herbert	100	12.5%
Conservative	G. Mitchinson	97	12.1%
Turnout			33.4%
Labour hold			

=== Old Harlow (2 seats) ===
Location of Old Harlow ward

Old Harlow
Party	Candidate	Votes	%
Labour	A. Argent	1,060	
Labour	Jonathan Simcox	1,037	
Conservative	M. Garnett	572	
Conservative	S. Livings	521	
Liberal Democrats	G. George	181	
Liberal Democrats	N. Macy	139	
Turnout			39.7%
Labour hold			
Labour hold			

=== Passmores ===
Location of Passmores ward

Passmores
Party	Candidate	Votes	%
Labour	Jim Rogers	745	63.1%
Liberal Democrats	A. Curran	227	19.2%
Conservative	T. McArdle	208	17.6%
Turnout			33.6%
Labour hold			

=== Potter Street ===
Location of Potter Street ward

Potter Street
Party	Candidate	Votes	%
Labour	Maggie Hulcoop	894	61.1%
Conservative	R. Cross	449	30.7%
Green	M. Powell	121	8.3%
Turnout			32.3%
Labour hold			

=== Stewards ===
Location of Stewards ward

Stewards
Party	Candidate	Votes	%
Liberal Democrats	Sue Lawton	680	58.7%
Labour	J. Tremayne	426	36.8%
Conservative	S. Butt	53	4.6%
Turnout			32.2%
Liberal Democrats hold			

=== Tye Green ===
Location of Tye Green ward

Tye Green
Party	Candidate	Votes	%
Labour	Ruth Watson	971	82.5%
Conservative	M. Fletcher	206	17.5%
Turnout			33.7%
Labour hold			

== By-elections between 1996 and 1998 ==
=== Great Parndon ===
Great Parndon by-election 25 September 1997
Party	Candidate	Votes	%	±%
Labour		488	53.0	−5.3
Conservative		433	47.0	+5.3
Majority		55	6.0	
Turnout				
Labour hold		Swing		

=== Latton Bush ===
Great Parndon by-election 25 September 1997
Party	Candidate	Votes	%	±%
Labour		503	72.5	+8.5
Conservative		115	16.6	−9.7
Liberal Democrats		56	8.1	−1.6
Green		20	2.9	+2.9
Majority		388	55.9	
Turnout				
Labour hold		Swing		

=== Mark Hall South ===
Great Parndon by-election 25 September 1997
Party	Candidate	Votes	%	±%
Labour		530	64.2	−17.6
Liberal Democrats		186	22.5	+22.5
Conservative		110	13.3	−4.9
Majority		344	41.7	
Turnout				
Labour hold		Swing		
