= 2019 Harlow District Council election =

| ← 2018 | 2 May 2019 | 2021 → |

11 of the 33 seats to Harlow District Council 17 seats needed for a majority
| | First party | Second party |
|---|---|---|
| Party | Labour | Conservative |
| Seats before | 20 | 13 |
| Seats won | 7 | 4 |
| Seats after | 20 | 13 |
| Seat change | Steady | Steady |
| Popular vote | 6,288 | 5,752 |
| Percentage | 39.1% | 35.7% |
- Map showing the results of contested wards in the 2019 Harlow District Council elections.
Council control before election
Labour
Council control after election
Labour

The 2019 Harlow District Council election took place on 2 May 2019 to elect members of Harlow District Council in Essex. This was on the same day as other local elections. The council remained under Labour Party control, with no seats changing hands.

After the election, the composition of the council remained at:

- Labour 20
- Conservative 13

== Ward results ==
=== Bush Fair ===
Location of Bush Fair ward

Bush Fair
| Party | Candidate | Votes | % |
|---|---|---|---|
| Labour | Jodi Dunne | 615 | 42.5 |
| Conservative | Andreea Hardware | 438 | 30.3 |
| UKIP | Anita Long | 302 | 20.9 |
| Liberal Democrats | Christopher Robins | 92 | 6.4 |
| Majority | | 177 | 12.2 |
| Turnout | | 1,447 | |
| Labour hold | | | |

=== Church Langley ===
Location of Church Langley ward

Church Langley
| Party | Candidate | Votes | % |
|---|---|---|---|
| Conservative | Andrew Johnson | 982 | 54.3 |
| Labour | Colin Monehen | 439 | 24.3 |
| UKIP | Patsy Long | 269 | 14.9 |
| Liberal Democrats | Christopher Millington | 119 | 6.6 |
| Majority | | 713 | 30.0 |
| Turnout | | 1,809 | |
| Conservative hold | | | |

=== Great Parndon ===
Location of Great Parndon ward

Great Parndon
| Party | Candidate | Votes | % |
|---|---|---|---|
| Conservative | David Carter | 681 | 45.9 |
| Harlow Alliance Party | Nicholas Taylor | 416 | 28.0 |
| Labour | Allan Jolley | 388 | 26.1 |
| Majority | | 265 | 17.8 |
| Conservative hold | | | |

=== Harlow Common ===
Location of Harlow Common ward

Harlow Common
| Party | Candidate | Votes | % |
|---|---|---|---|
| Labour | Mark Wilkinson | 647 | 42.5 |
| Conservative | John Steer | 381 | 25.0 |
| UKIP | Daniel Long | 294 | 19.3 |
| Harlow Alliance Party | Michael Carr | 201 | 13.2 |
| Majority | | 201 | 17.5 |
| Turnout | | 1,523 | |
| Labour hold | | | |

=== Little Parndon and Hare Street ===
Location of Little Parndon and Hare Street ward

Little Parndon and Hare Street
| Party | Candidate | Votes | % |
|---|---|---|---|
| Labour | Jean Clark | 839 | 56.7 |
| Conservative | Adam Jolles | 357 | 24.1 |
| UKIP | Christopher Staunton | 285 | 19.2 |
| Majority | | 482 | 32.6 |
| Turnout | | 1,481 | |
| Labour hold | | | |

=== Mark Hall ===
Location of Mark Hall ward

Mark Hall
| Party | Candidate | Votes | % |
|---|---|---|---|
| Labour | Bob Davis | 613 | 42.5 |
| UKIP | Richard Holloway | 354 | 24.6 |
| Conservative | Andrew Colley | 335 | 23.2 |
| Liberal Democrats | Lesley Rideout | 139 | 9.6 |
| Majority | | 259 | 17.9 |
| Turnout | | 1,441 | 27.73 |
| Labour hold | | | |

=== Netteswell ===
Location of Netteswell ward

Netteswell
| Party | Candidate | Votes | % |
|---|---|---|---|
| Labour | Nancy Watson | 571 | 45.3 |
| Conservative | Colleen Morrison | 314 | 24.9 |
| UKIP | Edward Hockham | 246 | 19.5 |
| Liberal Democrats | Robert Thurston | 130 | 10.3 |
| Majority | | 257 | 20.4 |
| Turnout | | 1,261 | 22.83 |
| Labour hold | | | |

=== Old Harlow ===
Location of Old Harlow ward

Old Harlow
| Party | Candidate | Votes | % |
|---|---|---|---|
| Conservative | Sue Livings | 969 | 52.4 |
| Labour | Andy Thornton | 569 | 30.8 |
| Harlow Alliance Party | Harry Mason | 311 | 16.8 |
| Majority | | 400 | 21.6 |
| Turnout | | 1,849 | 28.26 |
| Conservative hold | | | |

=== Staple Tye ===
Location of Staple Tye ward

Staple Tye
| Party | Candidate | Votes | % |
|---|---|---|---|
| Labour | John Strachan | 465 | 40.5 |
| Conservative | Stevie Souter | 364 | 31.7 |
| UKIP | Mark Gough | 319 | 27.8 |
| Majority | | 101 | 8.8 |
| Turnout | | 1,148 | 23.68 |
| Labour hold | | | |

=== Summers and Kingsmoor ===
Location of Summers and Kingsmoor ward

Summers and Kingsmoor
| Party | Candidate | Votes | % |
|---|---|---|---|
| Conservative | Clive Souter | 578 | 40.9 |
| Labour | Jake Payne | 429 | 30.4 |
| Harlow Alliance Party | Alan Leverett | 405 | 28.7 |
| Majority | | 149 | 10.5 |
| Turnout | | 1,412 | 27.27 |
| Conservative hold | | | |

=== Toddbrook ===
Location of Toddbrook ward

Toddbrook
| Party | Candidate | Votes | % |
|---|---|---|---|
| Labour | Frances Mason | 713 | 51.4 |
| Conservative | Thomas Reynolds | 363 | 26.2 |
| UKIP | Stephen Troup | 311 | 22.4 |
| Majority | | 350 | 25.2 |
| Turnout | | 1,387 | 25.36 |
| Labour hold | | | |
