= 2016 Harlow District Council election =

- 5 May 2016

11 of the 33 seats to Harlow District Council 17 seats needed for a majority
	First party	Second party	Third party
Party	Labour	Conservative	UKIP
Seats before	19	12	2
Seats won	7	5	0
Seats after	19	12	2
Seat change	Steady	Steady	Steady
Popular vote	7,665	6,661	4,018
Percentage	40.1%	34.8%	21.0%
- Map showing the results of contested wards in the 2016 Harlow District Council elections.
Council control before election
Labour
Council control after election
Labour

The 2016 Harlow District Council election took place on 5 May 2016 to elect members of Harlow District Council in England. This was on the same day as other local elections.

== Results summary ==
Harlow District Council election, 2016
Party	Seats	Gains	Losses	Net gain/loss	Seats %	Votes %	Votes	+/−
Labour	19	0	0	Steady		40.1	7,665	▲4.5
Conservative	12	0	0	Steady		34.8	6,661	▼6.1
UKIP	2	0	0	Steady		21.0	4,018	▲0.3
Liberal Democrats	0	0	0	Steady		3.6	695	▲0.8
Independent	0	0	0	Steady		0.4	79	▲0.4

== Ward results ==
=== Bush Fair ===
Location of Bush Fair ward

Bush Fair
Party	Candidate	Votes	%	±%
Labour	Mark Ingall	796	46.7	▲7.3
UKIP	Patsy Long	429	25.1	▲1.2
Conservative	Ash Malik	370	21.7	▼10.4
Liberal Democrats	Christopher Robins	111	6.5	▲1.8
Majority		367	21.6	
Labour hold		Swing		

=== Church Langley ===
Location of Church Langley ward

Church Langley
Party	Candidate	Votes	%	±%
Conservative	Simon Carter	997	55.1	▼4.2
UKIP	Simon Vincent	465	25.7	▲7.3
Labour	Jake Shepherd	349	19.3	▼0.5
Majority				
Conservative hold		Swing		

=== Great Parndon ===
Location of Great Parndon ward

Great Parndon
Party	Candidate	Votes	%	±%
Conservative	Eddie Johnson	789	44.7	▼4.4
Labour	Simon Vincent	571	32.4	▲1.2
UKIP	Chris Staunton	404	22.9	▲3.2
Majority				
Conservative hold		Swing		

=== Harlow Common ===
Location of Harlow Common ward

Harlow Common
Party	Candidate	Votes	%	±%
Labour	Emma Toal	785	39.0	▲2.0
Conservative	Hannah Ellis	672	33.4	▼3.1
UKIP	Mike Carr	475	23.6	▲0.3
Independent	Gary Roberts	79	3.9	N/A
Majority				
Labour hold		Swing		

=== Little Parndon & Hare Street ===
Location of Little Parndon and Hare Street ward

Little Parndon & Hare Street
Party	Candidate	Votes	%	±%
Labour	Jon Clempner	1,021	54.4	▲6.3
Conservative	Peter Lamb	492	26.2	▼6.7
UKIP	Richard Richardson	365	19.4	▲0.4
Majority				
Labour hold		Swing		

=== Mark Hall ===
Location of Mark Hall ward

Mark Hall
Party	Candidate	Votes	%	±%
Labour	Lanie Shears	751	44.3	▲4.6
UKIP	Janet Doyle	449	26.5	▲4.1
Conservative	Jane Steer	390	23.0	▼9.5
Liberal Democrats	Leslie Rideout	104	6.1	▲0.7
Majority				
Labour hold		Swing		

=== Netteswell ===
Location of Netteswell ward

Nettleswell
Party	Candidate	Votes	%	±%
Labour	Bibi Forman	749	47.7	▲4.0
Conservative	Amanda Maison	372	23.7	▼9.4
UKIP	Alan Leverett	361	23.0	▲4.6
Liberal Democrats	Robert Thurston	89	5.7	▲0.8
Majority				
Labour hold		Swing		

=== Old Harlow ===
Location of Old Harlow ward

Old Harlow
Party	Candidate	Votes	%	±%
Conservative	Michael Garnett	885	46.3	▼7.5
Labour	Eugenie Harvey	650	34.0	▲11.7
UKIP	Harry Mason	311	16.3	▼2.0
Liberal Democrats	Christopher Millington	66	3.5	▼2.1
Majority				
Conservative hold		Swing		

=== Staple Tye ===
Location of Staple Tye ward

Staple Tye
Party	Candidate	Votes	%	±%
Labour	Stefan Mullard	576	41.6	▲3.6
Conservative	Michael Hardware	485	35.0	▼0.1
UKIP	Dan Mason	325	23.4	▲1.4
Majority				
Labour hold		Swing		

=== Sumners & Kingsmoor ===
Location of Summers and Kingsmoor ward

Sumners & Kingsmoor
Party	Candidate	Votes	%	±%
Conservative	Russell Perrin	797	46.1	▲2.6
Labour	Allan Jolley	582	33.6	▲0.1
UKIP	Steve Witt	351	20.3	▼2.7
Majority				
Conservative hold		Swing		

=== Toddbrook ===
Location of Toddbrook ward

Toddbrook
Party	Candidate	Votes	%	±%
Labour	Phil Waite	835	50.5	▲4.8
Conservative	John Steer	412	24.9	▼8.4
UKIP	Chris Ward	408	24.7	▲3.7
Majority				
Labour hold		Swing		

== By-elections between 2016 and 2018 ==
=== Toddbrook ===
A by-election was held in Toddbrook on 28 September 2017 after the resignation of Labour councillor Rod Truan. The seat was held for Labour by Tony Edwards.

Bush Fair by-election 28 September 2017
Party	Candidate	Votes	%	±%
Labour	Tony Edwards	702		
Conservative	Peter Lamb	486		
UKIP	Patricia Long	98		
Green	James Aicken	41		
Liberal Democrats	Lesley Rideout	19		
Majority		216		
Turnout		153	24.20	
Labour hold		Swing		

=== Little Parndon and Hare Street ===
A by-election was held in Little Parndon and Hare Street on 8 March 2018 after the resignation of Labour council leader Jon Clempner. The seat was held for Labour by Chris Vince with a majority of 387 votes over the Conservatives.

Little Parndon and Hare Street by-election 8 March 2018
Party	Candidate	Votes	%	±%
Labour	Chris Vince	781	62.2	
Conservative	John Steer	394	31.4	
UKIP	Patsy Long	80	6.4	
Majority		387	30.8	
Turnout		1,255		
Labour hold		Swing		
