= 1998 Harlow District Council election =

← 1996	7 May 1998	1999 →

14 of the 42 seats to Harlow District Council 17 seats needed for a majority
	First party	Second party	Third party
Party	Labour	Liberal Democrats	Conservative
Last election	39	3	0
Seats before	40	2	0
Seats won	13	1	1
Seats after	38	3	1
Seat change	▼2	▲1	▲1
Popular vote	8,305	3,124	4,248
Percentage	53.0%	19.9%	27.1%
- Map showing the results of contested wards in the 1998 Harlow District Council elections.
Council control before election
Labour
Council control after election
Labour

The 1998 Harlow District Council election took place on 7 May 1998 to elect members of Harlow District Council in Essex, England. One third of the council was up for election and the Labour party stayed in overall control of the council.

After the election, the composition of the council was

- Labour 38
- Liberal Democrats 3
- Conservative 1

== Background ==
Before the election Labour had 40 of the 42 seats on the council, with only 2 Liberal Democrat councillors forming the opposition. 3 Labour councillors stood down at the election from Katherines with Sumners, Netteswell West and Tye Green wards.

Each of the Conservative, Labour and Liberal Democrats had candidates for all 15 seats contested at the election, with 2 seats available in Old Harlow ward.

== Election result ==
Labour held 13 of the 15 seats they had been defending, but the council chairman John Young was defeated in Kingsmoor ward by 21-year-old Conservative Andrew Johnson, who became the youngest councillor on the council. The Liberal Democrats also regained Stewards from Labour, a seat they had previously lost at a by-election.

Harlow local election result 1998
Party	Seats	Gains	Losses	Net gain/loss	Seats %	Votes %	Votes	+/−
Labour	13	0	2	▼2	86.7	53.0	8,305	▼4.3
Conservative	1	1	0	▲1	6.7	27.1	4,248	▲3.8
Liberal Democrats	1	1	0	▲1	6.7	19.9	3,124	▲1.4

All comparisons in vote share are to the corresponding 1994 election.

== Ward results ==
=== Brays Grove ===
Location of Brays Grove ward

Brays Grove
Party	Candidate	Votes	%
Labour	Annie Howard	524	71.6
Conservative	Ronald Tweed	119	16.3
Liberal Democrats	Ian Jackson	89	12.2
Majority		405	55.3
Turnout		732	
Labour hold			

=== Hare Street ===
Location of Hare Street ward

Hare Street
Party	Candidate	Votes	%
Labour	John Cave	422	65.9
Conservative	David Roberts	114	17.8
Liberal Democrats	Stanley Ward	104	16.3
Majority		308	48.1
Turnout		640	
Labour hold			

=== Katherines with Sumners ===
Location of Katherines with Sumner ward

Katherines with Sumners
Party	Candidate	Votes	%
Labour	Godfrey Hocking	445	44.2
Conservative	Simon Carter	419	41.6
Liberal Democrats	Harry Ackland-Snow	143	14.2
Majority		26	2.6
Turnout		1,007	
Labour hold			

=== Kingsmoor ===
Location of Kingsmoor ward

Kingsmoor
Party	Candidate	Votes	%
Conservative	Andrew Johnson	576	43.4
Labour	John Young	574	43.2
Liberal Democrats	Linda Jones	178	13.4
Majority		2	0.2
Turnout		1,328	
Conservative gain from Labour			

=== Latton Bush ===
Location of Latton Bush ward

Latton Bush
Party	Candidate	Votes	%
Labour	Alan Frost	548	57.9
Conservative	Pamela Norton	272	28.7
Liberal Democrats	Paul Lawton	127	13.4
Majority		276	29.1
Turnout		947	
Labour hold			

=== Little Parndon ===
Location of Little Parndon ward

Little Parndon
Party	Candidate	Votes	%
Labour	Mavis Carter	648	67.6
Conservative	Charles Ross	199	20.8
Liberal Democrats	Anthony Davis	111	11.6
Majority		449	46.9
Turnout		958	
Labour hold			

=== Mark Hall North ===
Mark Location of Hall North ward

Mark Hall North
Party	Candidate	Votes	%
Labour	Edith Morris	426	62.8
Conservative	Anthony Gronland	164	24.2
Liberal Democrats	Michael Atkinson	88	13.0
Majority		262	38.6
Turnout		678	
Labour hold			

=== Mark Hall South ===
Location of Mark Hall South ward

Mark Hall South
Party	Candidate	Votes	%
Labour	Caroline Vaughan	603	54.1
Liberal Democrats	Glennis George	400	35.9
Conservative	Dianne Crossingham	111	10.0
Majority		203	18.2
Turnout		1,114	
Labour hold			

=== Netteswell West ===
Location of Netteswell West ward

Netteswell West
Party	Candidate	Votes	%
Labour	Derek Eardley	396	66.4
Liberal Democrats	Shiela Herbert	110	18.5
Conservative	Sue Livings	90	15.1
Majority		286	48.0
Turnout		596	
Labour hold			

=== Old Harlow (2 seats) ===
Location of Old Harlow ward

Old Harlow (2 seats)
Party	Candidate	Votes	%
Labour	Jonathan Simcox	780	
Labour	Jacqueline Sully	749	
Conservative	Michael Garnett	638	
Conservative	George Reynolds	603	
Liberal Democrats	Gareth Higgins	206	
Liberal Democrats	Nicholas Macy	173	
Turnout		3,149	
Labour hold			
Labour hold			

=== Passmores ===
Locations of Passmores ward

Passmores
Party	Candidate	Votes	%
Labour	Rob Collyer	574	63.6
Conservative	Andrew Shannon	190	21.0
Liberal Democrats	David Arnold	139	15.4
Majority		384	42.5
Turnout		903	
Labour hold			

=== Potter Street ===
Location of Potter Street ward

Potter Street
Party	Candidate	Votes	%
Labour	Feroz Khan	681	41.2
Conservative	Ronald Cross	547	33.1
Liberal Democrats	William Arnott	425	25.7
Majority		134	8.1
Turnout		1,653	
Labour hold			

=== Stewards ===
Location of Stewards ward

Stewards
Party	Candidate	Votes	%
Liberal Democrats	Audrey Curran	704	64.9
Labour	Gregory Peck	311	28.7
Conservative	Stephen Butt	69	6.4
Majority		393	36.3
Turnout		1,084	
Liberal Democrats gain from Labour			

=== Tye Green ===
Location of Tye Green ward

Tye Green
Party	Candidate	Votes	%
Labour	Margaret Hickey	624	70.3
Conservative	Vivien Ross	137	15.4
Liberal Democrats	Valerie Scott	127	14.3
Majority		487	54.8
Turnout		888	
Labour hold			
