= 1999 Harlow District Council election =

← 1998	6 May 1999	2000 →

14 of the 42 seats to Harlow District Council 22 seats needed for a majority
	First party	Second party	Third party
Party	Labour	Conservative	Liberal Democrats
Seats before	38	1	3
Seats won	9	3	2
Seats after	34	4	4
Seat change	▼4	▲3	▲1
Popular vote	7,501	5,082	2,993
Percentage	47.4%	32.1%	18.9%
- Map showing the results of contested wards in the 1999 Harlow District Council elections.
Council control before election
Labour
Council control after election
Labour

The 1999 Harlow District Council election took place on 6 May 1999 to elect members of Harlow District Council in Essex, England. One third of the council was up for election and the Labour Party stayed in overall control of the council.

After the election, the composition of the council was:

- Labour 34
- Liberal Democrats 4
- Conservative 4

== Election results ==
Labour remained in control of the council with 34 of the 42 seats, compared to 4 each for the Conservatives and Liberal Democrats. Labour won 9 of the 14 seats contested, but lost 3 seats to the Conservatives in Great Parndon, Kingsmoor and Potter Street wards. The Liberal Democrats also gained a seat from Labour in Mark Hall South, while retaining a seat in Stewards ward. Overall turnout at the election was 29.85%.

Harlow local election result 1999
Party	Seats	Gains	Losses	Net gain/loss	Seats %	Votes %	Votes	+/−
Labour	9	0	4	▼4	64.3	47.4	7,501	▼5.6
Conservative	3	3	0	▲3	21.4	32.1	5,082	▲5.0
Liberal Democrats	2	1	0	▲1	14.3	18.9	2,993	▼1.0
Independent	0	0	0	0	0	1.0	156	▲1.0
Green	0	0	0	0	0	0.5	79	▲0.5

All comparisons in vote share are to the corresponding 1995 election.

== Ward results ==
=== Brays Grove ===
Location of Brays Grove ward

Brays Grove
Party	Candidate	Votes	%	±%
Labour	David Cameron	483	59.8	−11.8
Conservative	Joshua Jolles	212	26.2	+9.9
Liberal Democrats	Ian Jackson	113	14.0	+1.8
Majority		271	33.5	−21.8
Turnout		808	28.0	
Labour hold		Swing		

=== Great Parndon ===
Location of Great Parndon ward

Great Parndon
Party	Candidate	Votes	%
Conservative	Patrick McClarnon	578	48.5
Labour	Mark Wilkinson	517	43.4
Liberal Democrats	Nick Spenceley	96	8.1
Majority		61	5.1
Turnout		1,191	38.8
Conservative gain from Labour			

=== Katherines with Sumners ===
Location of Katherines with Sumner ward

Katherines with Sumners
Party	Candidate	Votes	%	±%
Labour	Robert Long	577	49.3	+5.1
Conservative	Simon Carter	472	40.3	−1.3
Liberal Democrats	Harry Ackland-Snow	121	10.3	−3.9
Majority		105	9.0	+6.4
Turnout		1,170	25.0	
Labour hold		Swing		

=== Kingsmoor ===
Location of Kingsmoor ward

Kingsmoor
Party	Candidate	Votes	%	±%
Conservative	Nicholas Churchill	581	45.5	+2.1
Labour	Greg Peck	530	41.5	−1.7
Liberal Democrats	Kenneth Addison	137	10.7	−2.7
Green	Geoffrey McMullan	29	2.3	+2.3
Majority		51	4.0	+3.8
Turnout		1,277	28.5	
Conservative gain from Labour		Swing		

=== Latton Bush ===
Location of Latton Bush ward

Latton Bush
Party	Candidate	Votes	%	±%
Labour	Alan Jones	538	57.4	−0.5
Conservative	Vivien Ross	235	25.1	−3.6
Liberal Democrats	Julian Edwards	164	17.5	+4.1
Majority		303	32.3	+3.2
Turnout		937	24.0	
Labour hold		Swing		

=== Little Parndon ===
Location of Little Parndon ward

Little Parndon
Party	Candidate	Votes	%	±%
Labour	John Young	674	64.3	−3.3
Conservative	Sue Livings	214	20.4	−0.4
Liberal Democrats	Anthony Davis	161	15.3	+3.7
Majority		460	43.9	−3.0
Turnout		1,049	28.8	
Labour hold		Swing		

=== Mark Hall North ===
Mark Location of Hall North ward

Mark Hall North
Party	Candidate	Votes	%	±%
Labour	Paul Bellairs	397	56.0	−6.8
Conservative	Mark Gough	217	30.6	+6.4
Liberal Democrats	Michael Atkinson	95	13.4	+0.4
Majority		180	25.4	−13.2
Turnout		709	34.0	
Labour hold		Swing		

=== Mark Hall South ===
Location of Mark Hall South ward

Mark Hall South
Party	Candidate	Votes	%	±%
Liberal Democrats	Nicholas Macy	707	49.5	+13.6
Labour	Terry Kent	619	43.4	−10.7
Conservative	George Reynolds	101	7.1	−2.9
Majority		88	6.2	
Turnout		1,427	39.0	
Liberal Democrats gain from Labour		Swing		

=== Netteswell East ===
Location of Netteswell East ward

Netteswell East
Party	Candidate	Votes	%
Labour	Bernie Jones	469	65.0
Conservative	Emma Thomas	153	21.2
Liberal Democrats	Sheila Herbert	99	13.7
Majority		316	43.8
Turnout		721	26.6
Labour hold			

=== Old Harlow ===
Location of Old Harlow ward

Old Harlow
Party	Candidate	Votes	%
Labour	Derek Fenny	757	47.2
Conservative	Michael Garnett	666	41.5
Liberal Democrats	Gareth Higgins	182	11.3
Majority		91	5.7
Turnout		1,605	33.0
Labour hold			

=== Passmores ===
Locations of Passmores ward

Passmores
Party	Candidate	Votes	%	±%
Labour	Janet Evans	483	47.6	−16.0
Conservative	Edward Johnson	395	38.9	+17.9
Liberal Democrats	Paul Lawton	137	13.5	−1.9
Majority		88	8.7	−33.8
Turnout		1,015	29.0	
Labour hold		Swing		

=== Potter Street ===
Location of Potter Street ward

Potter Street
Party	Candidate	Votes	%	±%
Conservative	Graeme Archer	1,036	49.5	+16.4
Labour	Sue Burgess	660	31.5	−9.7
Liberal Democrats	Stanley Ward	193	9.2	−16.5
Independent	Jock Arnott	156	7.4	+7.4
Green	William Powell	50	2.4	+2.4
Majority		376	17.9	
Turnout		2,095	29.0	
Conservative gain from Labour		Swing		

=== Stewards ===
Location of Stewards ward

Stewards
Party	Candidate	Votes	%	±%
Liberal Democrats	Lorna Spenceley	658	70.8	+5.9
Labour	Sandra Rootsey	201	21.6	−7.1
Conservative	Stephen Butt	71	7.6	+1.2
Majority		457	49.1	+12.8
Turnout		930	25.6	
Liberal Democrats hold		Swing		

=== Tye Green ===
Location of Tye Green ward

Tye Green
Party	Candidate	Votes	%	±%
Labour	Matthew Shepherd	596	68.0	−2.3
Conservative	Charles Ross	151	17.2	+1.8
Liberal Democrats	Robert Thurston	130	14.8	+0.5
Majority		445	50.7	−4.1
Turnout		877	25.0	
Labour hold		Swing		
