= 1994 Harlow District Council election =

English local election

← 1992	5 May 1994	1995 →

14 of the 42 seats to Harlow District Council 22 seats needed for a majority
	First party	Second party	Third party
Party	Labour	Conservative	Liberal Democrats
Last election	32	7	3
Seats won	13	0	1
Seats after	33	6	3
Seat change	▲1	▼1	Steady
Popular vote	12,708	5,170	4,112
Percentage	57.3%	23.3%	18.5%
- Map showing the results of contested wards in the 1994 Harlow District Council elections.
Council control before election
Labour
Council control after election
Labour

The 1994 Harlow District Council election took place on 5 May 1994 to elect members of Harlow District Council in Essex, England. This was on the same day as other local elections. The Labour Party retained control of the council, which it had held continuously since the council's creation in 1973.

== Election result ==
1994 Harlow local election result
Party	Seats	Gains	Losses	Net gain/loss	Seats %	Votes %	Votes	+/−
Labour	13	1	0	▲1	92.9	57.3	12,708	▼2.5
Liberal Democrats	1	0	0	Steady	7.1	18.5	4,112	▲5.0
Conservative	0	0	1	▼1	0.0	23.3	5,170	▼2.5
Independent	0	0	0	Steady	0.0	0.9	201	New

All comparisons in vote share are to the corresponding 1990 election.

== Ward results ==
=== Brays Grove ===
Location of Brays Grove ward

Brays Grove
Party	Candidate	Votes	%
Labour	A. Howard	958	77.2%
Conservative	D. Crossingham	283	22.8%
Turnout			41.1%
Labour hold			

=== Hare Street and Town Centre ===
Location of Hare Street and Town Centre ward

Hare Street and Town Centre
Party	Candidate	Votes	%
Labour	J. Cave	719	63.6%
Liberal Democrats	S. Ward	258	22.8%
Conservative	A. Shannon	154	13.6%
Turnout			43.6%
Labour hold			

=== Katherines With Sumner ===
Location of Katherines with Sumner ward

Katherines With Sumner
Party	Candidate	Votes	%
Labour	D. Pennick	1,102	58.5%
Conservative	S. Living	782	41.5%
Turnout			40.2%
Labour hold			

=== Kingsmoor ===
Location of Kingsmoor ward

Kingsmoor
Party	Candidate	Votes	%
Labour	J. Young	971	46.8%
Conservative	M. Rimmer	771	37.1%
Liberal Democrats	K. Addison	335	16.1%
Turnout			44.3%
Labour hold			

=== Latton Bush ===
Location of Latton Bush ward

Latton Bush
Party	Candidate	Votes	%
Labour	Bill Rammell	1,119	63.2%
Conservative	G. Mitchinson	373	21.1%
Liberal Democrats	D. Collins	279	15.8%
Turnout			46.3%
Labour hold			

=== Little Parndon ===
Location of Little Parndon ward

Little Parndon
Party	Candidate	Votes	%
Labour	M. Carter	1,097	67.6%
Conservative	D. Weales	325	20.0%
Independent	D. Weston	201	12.4%
Turnout			41.0%
Labour hold			

=== Mark Hall North ===
Location of Mark Hall North ward

Mark Hall North
Party	Candidate	Votes	%
Labour	E. Morris	705	68.8%
Conservative	J. Carter	319	31.2%
Turnout			49.3%
Labour hold			

=== Mark Hall South ===
Location of Mark Hall South ward

Mark Hall South
Party	Candidate	Votes	%
Labour	S. Anderson	997	59.5%
Conservative	M. Atkinson	455	27.1%
Liberal Democrats	J. Broomhead	225	13.4%
Turnout			45.8%
Labour hold			

=== Netteswell West ===
Location of Netteswell West ward

Netteswell West
Party	Candidate	Votes	%
Labour	K. Stevenson	617	60.4%
Liberal Democrats	W. Mitchell	268	26.2%
Conservative	J. Roberts	137	13.4%
Turnout			41.4%
Labour hold			

=== Old Harlow ===
Location of Old Harlow ward

Old Harlow
Party	Candidate	Votes	%
Labour	G. Lyddon	1,108	44.1%
Conservative	M. Garnett	917	36.5%
Liberal Democrats	G. George	485	19.3%
Turnout			53.7%
Labour hold			

=== Passmores ===
Location of Passmores ward

Passmores
Party	Candidate	Votes	%
Labour	M. Collyer	897	58.3%
Liberal Democrats	A. Curran	327	21.2%
Conservative	V. Sharron	315	20.5%
Turnout			43.0%
Labour hold			

=== Potter Street ===
Location of Potter Street ward

Potter Street
Party	Candidate	Votes	%
Labour	F. Khan	745	46.8%
Liberal Democrats	W. Arnott	655	41.1%
Conservative	D. Fleming	192	12.1%
Turnout			46.1%
Labour hold			

=== Stewards ===
Location of Stewards ward

Stewards
Party	Candidate	Votes	%
Liberal Democrats	D. Eardley	791	50.8%
Labour	J. Sullivan	606	38.9%
Conservative	S. Butt	161	10.3%
Turnout			41.8%
Liberal Democrats hold			

=== Tye Green ===
Location of Tye Green ward

Tye Green
Party	Candidate	Votes	%
Labour	W. Hanley	1,067	69.2%
Liberal Democrats	S. Curran	259	16.8%
Conservative	P. Weales	216	14.0%
Turnout			43.9%
Labour hold			
