= 1990 Harlow District Council election =

English local election

← 1988	3 May 1990	1991 →

15 of the 42 seats to Harlow District Council 22 seats needed for a majority
	First party	Second party	Third party
Party	Labour	Conservative	Liberal Democrats
Last election	35	4	3
Seats won	14	0	1
Seats after	35	4	3
Seat change	Steady	Steady	Steady
Popular vote	15,278	6,586	3,458
Percentage	59.8%	25.8%	13.5%
- Map showing the results of contested wards in the 1990 Harlow District Council elections.
Council control before election
Labour
Council control after election
Labour

The 1990 Harlow District Council election took place on 3 May 1990 to elect members of Harlow District Council in Essex, England. This was on the same day as other local elections. The Labour Party retained control of the council, which it had held continuously since the council's creation in 1973.

== Election result ==
1990 Harlow local election result
Party	Seats	Gains	Losses	Net gain/loss	Seats %	Votes %	Votes	+/−
Labour	14	0	0	Steady	93.3	59.8	15,278	▲2.0
Liberal Democrats	1	0	0	Steady	0.0	13.5	3,458	▼9.6
Conservative	0	0	0	Steady	6.7	25.8	6,586	▲10.5
HND	0	0	0	Steady	0.0	0.8	210	New

All comparisons in vote share are to the corresponding 1986 election.

== Ward results ==
=== Brays Grove ===
Location of Brays Grove ward

Brays Grove
Party	Candidate	Votes	%
Labour	A. Howard	1,053	69.8%
Conservative	S. Cross	232	15.4%
Liberal Democrats	C. Hayman	161	10.7%
HND	P. Green	63	4.2%
Turnout			48.1%
Labour hold			

=== Hare Street and Town Centre ===
Location of Hare Street and Town Centre ward

Hare Street and Town Centre
Party	Candidate	Votes	%
Labour	J. Cave	972	65.5%
Liberal Democrats	S. Ward	277	18.7%
Conservative	D. Fleming	234	15.8%
Turnout			50.6%
Labour hold			

=== Katherines With Sumner ===
Location of Katherines with Sumner ward

Katherines With Sumner
Party	Candidate	Votes	%
Labour	H. Bryant	1,065	49.5%
Conservative	B. Beale	838	38.9%
Liberal Democrats	P. Barton	249	11.6%
Turnout			45.2%
Labour hold			

=== Kingsmoor ===
Location of Kingsmoor ward

Kingsmoor
Party	Candidate	Votes	%
Labour	J. Young	1,170	49.0%
Conservative	S. Carter	1,005	42.1%
Liberal Democrats	B. Hanks	213	8.9%
Turnout			49.3%
Labour hold			

=== Latton Bush ===
Location of Latton Bush ward

Latton Bush
Party	Candidate	Votes	%
Labour	Bill Rammell	1,274	62.2%
Conservative	D. Messer	558	27.2%
Liberal Democrats	E. Scammell	217	10.6%
Turnout			51.3%
Labour hold			

=== Little Parndon ===
Location of Little Parndon ward

Little Parndon
Party	Candidate	Votes	%
Labour	M. Carter	1,357	68.1%
Conservative	S. Butt	366	18.4%
Liberal Democrats	L. Spenceley	271	13.6%
Turnout			48.5%
Labour hold			

=== Mark Hall North ===
Location of Mark Hall North ward

Mark Hall North
Party	Candidate	Votes	%
Labour	E. Morris	784	62.2%
Conservative	D. Roberts	364	28.9%
Liberal Democrats	V. Scott	113	9.0%
Turnout			57.6%
Labour hold			

=== Mark Hall South (2 seats) ===
Location of Mark Hall South ward

Mark Hall South (2 seats)
Party	Candidate	Votes	%
Labour	S. Anderson	1,341	
Labour	T. Kent	1,219	
Conservative	I. Flemimg	345	
Conservative	R. Keningale	320	
Liberal Democrats	N. Armitage	192	
Liberal Democrats	S. James	170	
Turnout			46.0%
Labour hold			
Labour hold			

=== Netteswell West ===
Location of Netteswell West ward

Netteswell West
Party	Candidate	Votes	%
Labour	R. Nash	784	66.0%
Conservative	P. Weales	239	20.1%
Liberal Democrats	S. Herbert	165	13.9%
Turnout			46.5%
Labour hold			

=== Old Harlow ===
Location of Old Harlow ward

Old Harlow
Party	Candidate	Votes	%
Labour	S. Firth	1,466	53.6%
Conservative	V. Roberts	1,059	38.7%
Liberal Democrats	N. Lincoln	211	7.7%
Turnout			59.3%
Labour hold			

=== Passmores ===
Location of Passmores ward

Passmores
Party	Candidate	Votes	%
Labour	M. Collyer	1,053	60.8%
Conservative	M. Baker	396	22.9%
Liberal Democrats	A. Curran	180	10.4%
HND	C. Barratt	103	5.9%
Turnout			44.0%
Labour hold			

=== Potter Street ===
Location of Potter Street ward

Potter Street
Party	Candidate	Votes	%
Labour	K. Feroz	979	63.8%
Conservative	F. Feekery	356	23.2%
Liberal Democrats	H. Fiveash	200	13.0%
Turnout			48.1%
Labour hold			

=== Stewards ===
Location of Stewards ward

Stewards
Party	Candidate	Votes	%
Liberal Democrats	B. Tomkins	849	46.5%
Labour	J. McColl	713	39.0%
Conservative	M. Rigden	265	14.5%
Turnout			47.6%
Liberal Democrats hold			

=== Tye Green ===
Location of Tye Green ward

Tye Green
Party	Candidate	Votes	%
Labour	W. Hanley	1,267	70.4%
Liberal Democrats	S. Livings	329	18.3%
Conservative	S. McArdle	160	8.9%
HND	S. Penn	44	2.4%
Turnout			48.9%
Labour hold			
