= 2000 Harlow District Council election =

← 1999	4 May 2000	2002 →

14 of the 42 seats to Harlow District Council 17 seats needed for a majority
	First party	Second party	Third party
Party	Labour	Conservative	Liberal Democrats
Seats before	34	8	8
Seats won	5	5	5
Seats after	26	8	8
Seat change	▼8	▲4	▲4
Popular vote	6,380	6,342	4,619
Percentage	36.2%	36.0%	26.2%
- Map showing the results of contested wards in the 2000 Harlow District Council elections.
Council control before election
Labour
Council control after election
Labour

The 2000 Harlow District Council election took place on 4 May 2000 to elect members of Harlow District Council in Essex, England. One third of the council was up for election and the Labour party stayed in overall control of the council.

After the election, the composition of the council was

- Labour 26
- Liberal Democrat 8
- Conservative 8

== Election result ==
Both the Conservatives and Liberal Democrats gained 4 seats from Labour, reducing Labour to only holding 5 seats at the election, although they retained a majority on the council. Among the Labour councillors to be defeated was the chairman of the council John McCree in Brays Grove ward. Overall turnout at the election was 30.86%, up from 29.85% at the 1999 election.

Harlow local election result 2000
Party	Seats	Gains	Losses	Net gain/loss	Seats %	Votes %	Votes	+/−
Labour	5	0	8	▼8	33.3	36.2	6,380	▼11.2
Conservative	5	4	0	▲4	33.3	36.0	6,342	▲3.9
Liberal Democrats	5	4	0	▲4	33.3	26.2	4,619	▲7.3
UKIP	0	0	0	0	0	1.0	176	▲1.0
People not Politics	0	0	0	0	0	0.5	85	▲0.5

== Ward results ==
=== Brays Grove ===
Location of Brays Grove ward

Brays Grove
Party	Candidate	Votes	%	±%
Liberal Democrats	Christopher Millington	579	52.8	+38.8
Labour	John McCree	374	34.1	−25.7
Conservative	Joshua Jolles	144	13.1	−13.1
Majority		205	18.7	
Turnout		1,097		
Liberal Democrats gain from Labour		Swing		

=== Great Parndon ===
Location of Great Parndon ward

Great Parndon
Party	Candidate	Votes	%	±%
Conservative	Edward Johnson	583	48.3	−0.2
Labour	Mark Wilkinson	469	38.8	−4.6
People not Politics	Mick Granger	85	7.0	+7.0
Liberal Democrats	Nick Spenceley	71	5.9	−2.2
Majority		114	9.4	+4.3
Turnout		1,208		
Conservative gain from Labour		Swing		

=== Hare Street and Little Parndon ===
Location of Hare Street and Little Parndon ward

Hare Street and Little Parndon
Party	Candidate	Votes	%	±%
Labour	Terry Abel	325	51.1	−14.8
Conservative	Andrew Shannon	190	29.9	+12.1
Liberal Democrats	Jane Steer	121	19.0	+2.7
Majority		135	21.2	−26.9
Turnout		636		
Labour hold		Swing		

=== Kingsmoor ===
Location of Kingsmoor ward

Kingsmoor
Party	Candidate	Votes	%	±%
Conservative	Mark Gough	609	57.8	+12.3
Labour	Suzanne Ennifer	334	31.7	−9.8
Liberal Democrats	Harry Ackland-Snow	110	10.4	−0.3
Majority		275	26.1	+22.1
Turnout		1,053		
Conservative gain from Labour		Swing		

=== Latton Bush ===
Location of Latton Bush ward

Latton Bush
Party	Candidate	Votes	%	±%
Labour	Greg Peck	416	43.4	−14.0
Conservative	Vivien Ross	383	39.9	+14.8
Liberal Democrats	Julian Edwards	160	16.7	−0.8
Majority		33	3.4	−28.9
Turnout		959		
Labour hold		Swing		

=== Little Parndon ===
Location of Little Parndon ward

Little Parndon
Party	Candidate	Votes	%	±%
Labour	Pennick Daphne	491	55.0	−9.3
Conservative	Darren Barden	227	25.4	+5.0
Liberal Democrats	Anthony Davis	174	19.5	+4.2
Majority		264	29.6	−14.3
Turnout		892		
Labour hold		Swing		

=== Mark Hall South ===
Location of Mark Hall South ward

Mark Hall South
Party	Candidate	Votes	%	±%
Liberal Democrats	Christopher Robins	694	51.5	+2.0
Labour	Kevin Brooks	500	37.1	−6.3
Conservative	David Croager	154	11.4	+4.3
Majority		194	14.4	+8.2
Turnout		1,348		
Liberal Democrats gain from Labour		Swing		

=== Netteswell East ===
Location of Netteswell East ward

Netteswell East
Party	Candidate	Votes	%	±%
Liberal Democrats	Robert Thurston	641	60.2	+46.5
Labour	Eschle Rob	351	33.0	−32.0
Conservative	Pamela Norton	72	6.8	−14.4
Majority		290	27.3	
Turnout		1,064	39.6	+13.0
Liberal Democrats gain from Labour		Swing		

=== Netteswell West ===
Location of Netteswell West ward

Netteswell West
Party	Candidate	Votes	%	±%
Liberal Democrats	Ian Jackson	462	51.9	+33.4
Labour	Jean Clark	354	39.7	−26.7
Conservative	Matthew Warren	75	8.4	−6.7
Majority		108	12.1	
Turnout		891		
Liberal Democrats gain from Labour		Swing		

=== Old Harlow ===
Location of Old Harlow ward

Old Harlow
Party	Candidate	Votes	%	±%
Conservative	Michael Garnet	819	46.1	+4.6
Labour	Ian Turner	617	34.7	−12.5
UKIP	Tony Bennett	176	9.9	+9.9
Liberal Democrats	Gareth Higgins	166	9.3	−2.0
Majority		202	11.4	
Turnout		1,778		
Conservative gain from Labour		Swing		

=== Passmores ===
Locations of Passmores ward

Passmores
Party	Candidate	Votes	%	±%
Labour	John Sullivan	510	46.6	−1.0
Conservative	Clare Thomas	451	41.2	+2.3
Liberal Democrats	Paul Lawton	134	12.2	−1.3
Majority		59	5.4	−3.3
Turnout		1,095		
Labour hold		Swing		

=== Potter Street (2 seats) ===
Location of Potter Street ward

Potter Street (2 seats)
Party	Candidate	Votes	%
Conservative	Simon Carter	1,175	
Conservative	George Reynolds	1,137	
Labour	Sue Burgess	552	
Labour	Maggie Hulcoop	512	
Liberal Democrats	Michael Atkinson	270	
Liberal Democrats	Stan Curran	219	
Turnout		3,865	
Conservative hold			
Conservative gain from Labour			

=== Stewards ===
Location of Stewards ward

Stewards
Party	Candidate	Votes	%	±%
Liberal Democrats	Sue Lawton	614	72.2	+1.4
Conservative	Guy Mitchinson	118	13.9	+6.3
Labour	Sandra Rootsey	118	13.9	−7.7
Majority		496	58.4	+9.3
Turnout		850		
Liberal Democrats hold		Swing		

=== Tye Green ===
Location of Tye Green ward

Tye Green
Party	Candidate	Votes	%	±%
Labour	Terry Kent	457	52.8	−15.2
Conservative	Charles Ross	205	23.7	+6.5
Liberal Democrats	Emma Smith	204	23.6	+8.8
Majority		252	29.1	−21.6
Turnout		866		
Labour hold		Swing		

== By-elections between 2000 and 2002 ==
Little Parndon by-election 7 June 2001
Party	Candidate	Votes	%	±%
Labour		1,185	54.9	−0.1
Conservative		558	25.9	+0.5
Liberal Democrats		415	19.2	−0.3
Majority		627	29.1	−0.5
Turnout		2,158		
Labour hold		Swing		
