= 1976 Harlow District Council election =

← 1973	6 May 1976	1978 →

All 42 seats to Harlow District Council 22 seats needed for a majority
	First party	Second party	Third party
Party	Labour	Liberal	Conservative
Last election	38	4	0
Seats won	35	4	3
Seat change	▼3	Steady	▲3
Popular vote	10,959	6,915	3,310
Percentage	49.5%	31.2%	14.9%
- Map showing the results of contested wards in the 1976 Harlow District Council elections.
Council control before election
Labour
Council control after election
Labour

The 1976 Harlow District Council election took place on 6 May 1976 to elect members of Harlow District Council in Essex, England. This was on the same day as other local elections. The Labour Party retained control of the council.

== Election result ==
1976 Harlow local election result
Party	Seats	Gains	Losses	Net gain/loss	Seats %	Votes %	Votes	+/−
Labour	35			▼3	81.3	49.5	10,959	▼13.4
Liberal	4			Steady	12.5	31.2	6,915	▲16.1
Conservative	3			▲3	6.3	14.9	3,310	▼1.8
Independent Labour	0			Steady	0.0	3.1	696	▲0.4
Communist	0			Steady	0.0	1.2	264	▼1.5

== Ward results ==
=== Brays Grove (3 seats) ===
Location of Brays Grove ward

Brays Grove (3 seats)
Party	Candidate	Votes	%
Labour	B. Evans	699	
Labour	M. Danvers	690	
Labour	D. Howard	642	
Conservative	G. Groves	353	
Conservative	J. Groves	302	
Conservative	C. Johnson	291	
Liberal	K. Sams	187	
Liberal	P. Naylor	172	
Liberal	J. Mallender	164	
Turnout			39.0%

=== Great Parndon (2 seats) ===
Location of Great Parndon ward

Great Parndon (2 seats)
Party	Candidate	Votes	%
Labour	C. Cave	645	
Labour	J. Cave	609	
Liberal	G. Fallon	518	
Conservative	P. Ellis	458	
Conservative	B. Clenshaw	453	
Liberal	A. Harwood	420	
Turnout			53.4%

=== Hare Street and Town Centre (2 seats) ===
Location of Hare Street and Town Centre ward

Hare Street and Town Centre (2 seats)
Party	Candidate	Votes	%
Labour	J. Hobbs	636	
Labour	J. Moore	624	
Liberal	A. Merryweather	449	
Liberal	C. Merryweather	403	
Turnout			38.2%

=== Katherines With Sumner (2 seats) ===
Location of Katherines with Sumner ward

Katherines With Sumner (2 seats)
Party	Candidate	Votes	%
Liberal	A. Trigwell	205	
Labour	C. Cackett	185	
Labour	H. Talbot	179	
Liberal	R. Subryan	177	
Turnout			54.6%

=== Kingsmoor (3 seats) ===
Location of Kingsmoor ward

Kingsmoor (3 seats)
Party	Candidate	Votes	%
Labour	T. Kent	626	
Labour	A. Jones	612	
Labour	R. Rowland	543	
Liberal	M. Plon	531	
Liberal	D. Benda	483	
Liberal	E. Murray	472	
Conservative	K. Cheshire	424	
Conservative	E. Hughes	419	
Conservative	D. Freyer	410	
Independent Labour	A. Hudson	182	
Turnout			41.6%

=== Latton Bush (3 seats) ===
Location of Latton Bush ward

Latton Bush (3 seats)
Party	Candidate	Votes	%
Labour	F. Jackson	750	
Labour	P. Bruce	716	
Labour	E. Albone	658	
Independent Labour	E. Myers	514	
Conservative	P. Barker	436	
Liberal	J. Rudd	412	
Liberal	R. Wilson	375	
Liberal	J. Broughall	355	
Turnout			44.9%

=== Little Parndon (3 seats) ===
Location of Little Parndon ward

Little Parndon (3 seats)
Party	Candidate	Votes	%
Labour	D. Condon	869	
Liberal	J. Jesse	853	
Labour	M. Carter	837	
Labour	G. Newport	828	
Liberal	D. Eldridge	798	
Liberal	A. Davies	784	
Turnout			43.7%

=== Mark Hall North (2 seats) ===
Location of Mark Hall North ward

Mark Hall North (2 seats)
Party	Candidate	Votes	%
Labour	J. McAlpine	539	
Labour	S. Anderson	522	
Conservative	M. Whyte	341	
Conservative	C. Riley	312	
Liberal	M. Ramsay	217	
Liberal	L. Barton	209	
Turnout			47.6%

=== Mark Hall South (3 seats) ===
Location of Mark Hall South ward

Mark Hall South (3 seats)
Party	Candidate	Votes	%
Labour	D. Burnham	1,002	
Labour	L. Smith	917	
Labour	D. Richards	916	
Conservative	E. Hagger	396	
Conservative	A. Hayes	393	
Conservative	C. Hand	373	
Liberal	P. Simpson	332	
Liberal	M. Brown	312	
Liberal	V. Hook	290	
Turnout			43.4%

=== Netteswell East (2 seats) ===
Location of Netteswell East ward

Netteswell East (2 seats)
Party	Candidate	Votes	%
Labour	A. Graham	686	
Labour	A. Garner	660	
Liberal	D. Brown	252	
Liberal	R. Day	242	
Turnout			33.9%

=== Netteswell West (2 seats) ===
Location of Netteswell West ward

Netteswell West (2 seats)
Party	Candidate	Votes	%
Labour	J. Desormeaux	565	
Labour	R. Morris	497	
Liberal	P. Davis	219	
Liberal	A. Harwood	213	
Turnout			37.1%

=== Old Harlow (3 seats) ===
Location of Old Harlow ward

Old Harlow (3 seats)
Party	Candidate	Votes	%
Conservative	H. Dutton	902	
Conservative	L. Dutton	830	
Conservative	F. Smith	798	
Labour	B. Jenkins	716	
Labour	M. Gerrard	704	
Labour	N. Dunkinson	686	
Liberal	W. Breakall	568	
Liberal	J. Kelly	522	
Liberal	B. Zacks	508	
Turnout			55.1%

=== Passmores (3 seats) ===
Location of Passmores ward

Passmores (3 seats)
Party	Candidate	Votes	%
Labour	T. Farr	828	
Labour	M. Juliff	787	
Labour	M. Collyer	751	
Liberal	D. Filler	539	
Liberal	T. Owen	496	
Communist	A. Booth	264	
Turnout			40.1%

=== Potter Street (3 seats) ===
Location of Potter Street ward

Potter Street (3 seats)
Party	Candidate	Votes	%
Labour	B. Phelps	736	
Labour	W. Gibson	692	
Labour	R. Bruce	600	
Liberal	P. Cooney	389	
Liberal	S. Ward	350	
Liberal	C. Dunham	324	
Turnout			39.6%

=== Stewards (3 seats) ===
Location of Stewards ward

Stewards (3 seats)
Party	Candidate	Votes	%
Liberal	B. Barnes	705	
Liberal	J. Hewitt	674	
Labour	R. Didham	639	
Liberal	K. Chowdhary	611	
Labour	C. Longhurst	568	
Labour	D. Molden	566	
Turnout			38.2%

=== Tye Green (3 seats) ===
Location of Tye Green ward

Tye Green (3 seats)
Party	Candidate	Votes	%
Labour	A. James	838	
Labour	M. Lawn	801	
Labour	B. Downie	782	
Liberal	P. Ramsay	539	
Liberal	J. Wilson	527	
Liberal	C. Thomson	496	
Turnout			39.9%
