= 2026 Harlow District Council election =

2026 English local government election

- 7 May 2026

11 out of 33 seats to Harlow District Council 17 seats needed for a majority
- Registered: 66,594
- Turnout: 26,945; 40.5%
	First party	Second party	Third party
Leader	Dan Swords	None	James Griggs
Party	Conservative	Reform	Labour
Last election	17 seats, 51.5%	Did not stand	16 seats, 43.8%
Seats before	17	1	15
Seats after	22	1	10
Seat change	▲5	Steady	▼5
Popular vote	15,213	5,408	3,548
Percentage	56.7%	20.2%	13.2%
	Fourth party
Party	Green
Popular vote	2,539
Percentage	9.5%
- Results by ward
Leader before election
Dan Swords
Conservative
Leader after election
Dan Swords
Conservative

The 2026 Harlow District Council election took place on 7 May 2026 to elect members of Harlow District Council in Essex, England. It was held concurrently with other local elections.

The incumbent Conservative Party increased their majority to 22 seats, up from 17 seats. The Labour Party lost all five seats up for reelection.

== Summary ==
=== Council composition ===
After 2024 election		Before 2026 election		After 2026 election	
Party	Seats	Party	Seats	Party	Seats
Conservative	17	Conservative	17	Conservative	22
Labour	16	Labour	15	Labour	10
Reform	0	Reform	1	Reform	1

Changes 2024–2026:

- August 2024: Chris Vince (Labour) resigns – by-election held October 2024
- October 2024: Linda Clark (Labour) wins by-election
- March 2025: Aiden O'Dell (Labour) resigns – by-election held May 2025
- May 2025: Paul Jago (Reform) gains by-election from Labour

=== Election result ===
2026 Harlow District Council election
Party	This election				Full council			This election		
Party	Candidates	Seats	Net	Seats %	Other	Total	Total %	Votes	Votes %	+/−
Conservative	{{{candidates}}}	11	+5	100	11	22	66.7	15,213	56.7	
Reform	{{{candidates}}}	0	0	0.0	1	1	3.0	5,408	20.2	
Labour	{{{candidates}}}	0	-5	0.0	10	10	30.3	3,548	13.2	
Green	{{{candidates}}}	0	0	0.0	0	0	0.0	2,539	9.5	
Liberal Democrats	{{{candidates}}}	0	0	0.0	0	0	0.0	41	0.2	
Independent	{{{candidates}}}	0	0	0.0	0	0	0.0	32	0.1	
TUSC	{{{candidates}}}	0	0	0.0	0	0	0.0	29	0.1	

== Incumbents ==
Ward	Incumbent councillor	Party	Re-standing
Bush Fair	Mark Ingall	Labour	No
Church Langley North & Newhall	Michael Hardware	Conservative	Yes
Church Langley South & Potter Street	James Leppard	Conservative	Yes
Great Parndon	Matthew Saggers	Conservative	Yes
Latton Bush & Stewards	Stacy Seales	Conservative	No
Little Parndon & Town Centre	Maggie Hulcoop (Note: Elected at the 2024 Little Parndon and Town Centre by-election.)	Labour	No
Mark Hall	Lanie Shears	Labour	Yes (Note: Stood in Little Parndon & Town Centre ward.)
Netteswell	Stafan Mullard-Toal	Labour	Yes
Old Harlow	Sue Livings	Conservative	Yes
Passmores	Jake Shepherd	Labour Co-op	Yes
Sumners & Kingsmoor	Emma Ghaffari	Conservative	Yes

== Ward results ==
=== Bush Fair ===
Bush Fair
Party	Candidate	Votes	%	±%
Conservative	Geoff Longster	1,327	52.2	+19.0
Reform	Dan Long	596	23.5	N/A
Labour	Rosanna Daisy	368	14.5	−29.4
Green	David Margetts	250	9.8	−0.2
Majority		731	28.7	N/A
Rejected ballots		19	0.7	N/A
Turnout		2,560	39.0	+10.7
Registered electors		6,563		
Conservative gain from Labour				

=== Church Langley North & Newhall ===
Church Langley North & Newhall
Party	Candidate	Votes	%	±%
Conservative	Michael Hardware*	1,636	65.4	+8.2
Reform	Tracy Cranfield	487	19.5	N/A
Labour	Jeff Mace	198	7.9	−22.2
Green	Bengi White	179	7.2	−5.5
Majority		1,149	45.9	N/A
Rejected ballots		6	0.2	N/A
Turnout		2,504	44.3	+17.0
Registered electors		5,657		
Conservative hold				

=== Church Langley South & Potter Street ===
Church Langley South & Potter Street
Party	Candidate	Votes	%	±%
Conservative	James Leppard*	1,682	58.7	+7.5
Reform	Amanda Maison	650	22.7	N/A
Labour	Harry Tennison	264	9.2	−21.8
Green	Paul King	235	8.2	−2.0
Independent	Gary Roberts	32	1.1	N/A
Majority		1,032	35.6	N/A
Rejected ballots		26	0.9	N/A
Turnout		2,896	42.5	+15.9
Registered electors		6,808		
Conservative hold				

=== Great Parndon ===
Great Parndon
Party	Candidate	Votes	%	±%
Conservative	Matthew Saggers*	1,614	65.2	+17.4
Reform	Peter Buss	444	17.9	N/A
Labour	Anita Schlutschik	242	9.8	−20.0
Green	Neil Crouch	177	7.1	−0.5
Majority		1,170	47.1	N/A
Rejected ballots		8	0.3	N/A
Turnout		2,486	44.4	+13.8
Registered electors		5,604		
Conservative hold				

=== Latton Bush & Stewards ===
Latton Bush & Stewards
Party	Candidate	Votes	%	±%
Conservative	John Steer	1,604	59.8	+19.9
Reform	Stephen Thompson	497	18.5	N/A
Labour	Simon Vincent	362	13.5	−26.8
Green	Howard Beaumont	219	8.2	−1.5
Majority		1,107	41.1	N/A
Rejected ballots		7	0.3	N/A
Turnout		2,691	38.8	+8.0
Registered electors		6,941		
Conservative hold				

=== Little Parndon & Town Centre ===
Little Parndon & Town Centre
Party	Candidate	Votes	%	±%
Conservative	Simon Carter	866	45.8	+16.8
Labour	Lanie Shears*	447	23.7	−33.3
Reform	Wendy-Jane Harding	343	18.1	N/A
Green	Madison Baker	234	12.4	−1.6
Majority		419	22.0	N/A
Rejected ballots		12	0.6	N/A
Turnout		1,902	36.3	+10.2
Registered electors		5,246		
Conservative gain from Labour		Swing	▲25.1	

=== Mark Hall ===
Mark Hall
Party	Candidate	Votes	%	±%
Conservative	John Purse	1,167	50.5	+27.8
Reform	Mark Gough	456	19.7	N/A
Labour	Christine Gallacher	357	15.5	−24.6
Green	Julie Taylor	330	14.3	−6.2
Majority		711	30.7	N/A
Rejected ballots		9	0.4	N/A
Turnout		2,318	40.3	+12.6
Registered electors		5,746		
Conservative gain from Labour				

=== Netteswell ===
Netteswell ward
Party	Candidate	Votes	%	±%
Conservative	Colleen Lee Morrison	1,029	49.0	
Reform	Cindy Fry	414	19.7	
Labour	Stefan Peter Mullard-Toal	372	17.7	
Green	Charlie Hancock	223	10.6	
Liberal Democrats	Lesley Anne Rideout	41	2.0	
Majority		615	29.3	
Rejected ballots		18	0.9	
Turnout		2099	35.0	
Registered electors		5,993		
Conservative gain from Labour				

=== Old Harlow ===
Old Harlow ward
Party	Candidate	Votes	%	±%
Conservative	Sue Jeanette Livings	1,755	61.0	
Reform	Eileen Margaret Mcmanus	608	21.1	
Labour	Liam Kerrigan	247	8.6	
Green	Jennifer Steadnan	240	8.3	
TUSC	Paul Lenihan	16	0.6	
Majority		1147	39.9	
Rejected ballots		10	0.3	
Turnout		2878	44.8	
Registered electors		6,430		
Conservative hold				

=== Passmores ===
Passmores ward
Party	Candidate	Votes	%	±%
Conservative	Nidhi Hindocha	962	46.4	
Reform	Shirley Ann Mcgee	442	21.3	
Labour Co-op	Jake David Adam Shepard	424	20.4	
Green	Stephanie Angela Marsh	242	11.7	
Majority		520	25.1	
Rejected ballots		8	0.4	
Turnout		2074	38.2	
Registered electors		5,432		
Conservative gain from Labour				

=== Sumners and Kingsmoor ===
Sumners and Kingsmoor ward
Party	Candidate	Votes	%	±%
Conservative	Emma Louise Marie Ghaffari	1,571	61.9	
Reform	Jamie Paul Terence Winslow	471	18.6	
Labour	Charlie Cochrane	267	10.5	
Green	Julie Ann Bull	210	8.3	
TUSC	Andrew James Hammond	13	0.5	
Majority		1100	43.4	
Rejected ballots		5	0.2	
Turnout		2537	41.1	
Registered electors		6,174		
Conservative hold				
