= 1995 Harlow District Council election =

English local election

← 1994	4 May 1995	1996 →

16 of the 42 seats to Harlow District Council 22 seats needed for a majority
	First party	Second party	Third party
Party	Labour	Liberal Democrats	Conservative
Last election	33	3	6
Seats won	15	1	0
Seats after	37	3	2
Seat change	▲4	Steady	▼4
Popular vote	13,032	2,741	4,026
Percentage	65.7%	13.8%	20.3%
- Map showing the results of contested wards in the 1995 Harlow District Council elections.
Council control before election
Labour
Council control after election
Labour

The 1995 Harlow District Council election took place on 4 May 1995 to elect members of Harlow District Council in Essex, England. This was on the same day as other local elections. The Labour Party retained control of the council, which it had held continuously since the council's creation in 1973.

== Election result ==
1995 Harlow local election result
Party	Seats	Gains	Losses	Net gain/loss	Seats %	Votes %	Votes	+/−
Labour	15	4	0	▲4	93.8	65.7	13,032	▲15.6
Liberal Democrats	1	0	0	Steady	6.3	13.8	2,741	▼1.7
Conservative	0	0	4	▼4	0.0	20.3	4,026	▼14.1
Green	0	0	0	Steady	0.0	0.2	48	New

All comparisons in vote share are to the corresponding 1991 election.

== Ward results ==
=== Brays Grove (2 seats) ===
Location of Brays Grove ward

Brays Grove (2 seats)
Party	Candidate	Votes	%
Labour	David Cameron	853	
Labour	A. Garner	806	
Conservative	A. Shannon	160	
Conservative	R. Tweed	131	
Turnout			36.3%
Labour hold			
Labour hold			

=== Great Parndon ===
Location of Great Parndon ward

Great Parndon
Party	Candidate	Votes	%
Labour	K. Patten	785	54.5%
Conservative	P. McClarnon	533	37.0%
Liberal Democrats	S. Ward	123	8.5%
Turnout			46.0%
Labour gain from Conservative			

=== Katherines With Sumner ===
Location of Katherines with Sumner ward

Katherines With Sumner
Party	Candidate	Votes	%
Labour	Robert Long	948	58.4%
Conservative	S. Carter	485	29.9%
Liberal Democrats	G. Hocking	191	11.8%
Turnout			34.9%
Labour gain from Conservative			

=== Kingsmoor ===
Location of Kingsmoor ward

Kingsmoor
Party	Candidate	Votes	%
Labour	Rory Coxhill	906	57.0%
Conservative	R. Cross	468	29.5%
Liberal Democrats	L. Jones	215	13.5%
Turnout			34.7%
Labour gain from Conservative			

=== Latton Bush ===
Location of Latton Bush ward

Latton Bush
Party	Candidate	Votes	%
Labour	C. Fleming	1,075	79.8%
Conservative	E. Roberts	272	20.2%
Turnout			36.0%
Labour hold			

=== Little Parndon ===
Location of Little Parndon ward

Little Parndon
Party	Candidate	Votes	%
Labour	Dick Nash	1,172	76.9%
Conservative	D. Weales	202	13.2%
Liberal Democrats	B. Thompson	151	9.9%
Turnout			39.4%
Labour hold			

=== Mark Hall North ===
Location of Mark Hall North ward

Mark Hall North
Party	Candidate	Votes	%
Labour	Paul Bellairs	638	72.5%
Conservative	D. Crossingham	151	17.2%
Liberal Democrats	P. Kitchener	91	10.3%
Turnout			42.8%
Labour hold			

=== Mark Hall South ===
Location of Mark Hall South ward

Mark Hall South
Party	Candidate	Votes	%
Labour	Terry Kent	1,004	71.9%
Liberal Democrats	M. Atkinson	242	17.3%
Conservative	J. Broomhead	150	10.7%
Turnout			38.2%
Labour hold			

=== Netteswell East ===
Location of Netteswell East ward

Netteswell East
Party	Candidate	Votes	%
Labour	Bernard Jones	885	82.6%
Conservative	P. Weales	187	17.4%
Turnout			40.1%
Labour hold			

=== Old Harlow (2 seats) ===
Location of Old Harlow ward

Old Harlow (2 seats)
Party	Candidate	Votes	%
Labour	Derek Fenny	1,167	
Labour	Jonathan Simcox	1,109	
Conservative	S. Livings	678	
Conservative	M. Garnett	664	
Liberal Democrats	G. George	234	
Liberal Democrats	J. Dawson	213	
Turnout			46.3%
Labour gain from Conservative			
Labour hold			

=== Passmores ===
Location of Passmores ward

Passmores
Party	Candidate	Votes	%
Labour	M. Juliff	888	66.9%
Conservative	A. Bezdel	240	18.1%
Liberal Democrats	A. Curran	200	15.1%
Turnout			37.3%
Labour hold			

=== Potter Street ===
Location of Potter Street ward

Potter Street
Party	Candidate	Votes	%
Labour	W. Gibson	985	57.4%
Liberal Democrats	W. Arnott	486	28.3%
Conservative	G. Mitchinson	198	11.5%
Green	M. Powell	48	2.8%
Turnout			43.5%
Labour hold			
Labour hold			

=== Stewards ===
Location of Stewards ward

Stewards
Party	Candidate	Votes	%
Liberal Democrats	Lorna Spenceley	808	53.5%
Labour	J. Sullivan	634	42.0%
Conservative	S. Butt	67	4.4%
Turnout			41.4%
Liberal Democrats hold			

=== Tye Green ===
Location of Tye Green ward

Tye Green
Party	Candidate	Votes	%
Labour	Matthew Shepherd	1,092	82.3%
Conservative	E. Jenks	235	17.7%
Turnout			38.0%
Labour hold			
