= 1978 Harlow District Council election =

← 1976	4 May 1978	1979 →

14 of the 42 seats to Harlow District Council 22 seats needed for a majority
	First party	Second party	Third party
Party	Labour	Liberal	Conservative
Last election	35	4	3
Seats won	11	1	2
Seats after	33	5	4
Seat change	▼2	▲1	▲1
Popular vote	11,238	3,096	6,213
Percentage	54.4%	15.0%	30.1%
- Map showing the results of contested wards in the 1978 Harlow District Council elections.
Council control before election
Labour
Council control after election
Labour

The 1978 Harlow District Council election took place on 4 May 1978 to elect members of Harlow District Council in Essex, England. This was on the same day as other local elections. The Labour Party retained control of the council.

== Election result ==
1978 Harlow local election result
Party	Seats	Gains	Losses	Net gain/loss	Seats %	Votes %	Votes	+/−
Labour	11	0	0	▼2	78.6	54.4	11,238	
Conservative	2	0	0	▲1	14.3	30.1	6,213	
Liberal	1	0	0	▲1	7.1	15.0	3,096	
Communist	0	0	0	Steady	0.0	0.5	101	

== Ward results ==
=== Brays Grove ===
Location of Brays Grove ward

Brays Grove
Party	Candidate	Votes	%
Labour	D. Howard	741	58.0%
Conservative	G. Groves	429	33.6%
Liberal	P. Naylor	108	8.5%
Turnout			37.7%
Labour hold			

=== Hare Street and Town Centre ===
Location of Hare Street and Town Centre ward

Hare Street and Town Centre
Party	Candidate	Votes	%
Labour	J. Moore	714	64.0%
Conservative	E. Atkins	276	24.8%
Liberal	A. Merryweather	276	24.8%
Turnout			36.3%
Labour hold			

=== Katherines With Sumner ===
Location of Katherines with Sumner ward

Katherines With Sumner
Party	Candidate	Votes	%
Conservative	C. Johnson	458	48.8%
Labour	J. Lockhart	359	38.2%
Liberal	D. Bardell	122	13.0%
Turnout			48.3%
Conservative gain from Labour			

=== Kingsmoor ===
Location of Kingsmoor ward

Kingsmoor
Party	Candidate	Votes	%
Labour	R. Rowland	806	47.1%
Conservative	L. Atkins	653	38.2%
Liberal	L. Swanton	251	14.7%
Turnout			38.2%
Labour hold			

=== Latton Bush ===
Location of Latton Bush ward

Latton Bush
Party	Candidate	Votes	%
Labour	S. Edwards	1,058	57.3%
Conservative	M. Robertson	668	36.2%
Liberal	I. Wilson	119	6.4%
Turnout			44.1%
Labour hold			

=== Little Parndon ===
Location of Little Parndon ward

Little Parndon
Party	Candidate	Votes	%
Labour	M. Carter	1,066	54.2%
Conservative	M. Bezdel	750	38.1%
Liberal	D. Eldridge	150	7.6%
Turnout			45.3%
Labour hold			

=== Mark Hall North ===
Location of Mark Hall North ward

Mark Hall North
Party	Candidate	Votes	%
Labour	E. Morris	692	52.1%
Conservative	P. Geller	529	39.8%
Liberal	M. Ramsay	107	8.1%
Turnout			54.5%
Labour hold			

=== Mark Hall South ===
Location of Mark Hall South ward

Mark Hall South
Party	Candidate	Votes	%
Labour	S. Anderson	971	61.5%
Conservative	J. Geller	477	30.2%
Liberal	J. Mercer	130	8.2%
Turnout			38.4%
Labour hold			

=== Netteswell West ===
Location of Netteswell West ward

Netteswell West
Party	Candidate	Votes	%
Labour	M. Gerrard	620	68.2%
Liberal	P. Ramsay	289	31.8%
Turnout			35.8%
Labour hold			

=== Old Harlow ===
Location of Old Harlow ward

Old Harlow
Party	Candidate	Votes	%
Conservative	F. Smith	1,089	46.5%
Labour	S. Firth	1,030	44.0%
Liberal	J. Jacob	223	9.5%
Turnout			51.8%
Conservative hold			

=== Passmores ===
Location of Passmores ward

Passmores
Party	Candidate	Votes	%
Labour	M. Collyer	814	54.5%
Conservative	M. Moore	463	31.0%
Liberal	T. Owen	116	7.8%
Communist	A. Booth	101	6.8%
Turnout			37.6%
Labour hold			

=== Potter Street ===
Location of Potter Street ward

Potter Street
Party	Candidate	Votes	%
Labour	R. Bruce	791	72.8%
Liberal	S. Ward	295	27.2%
Turnout			34.3%
Labour hold			

=== Stewards ===
Location of Stewards ward

Stewards
Party	Candidate	Votes	%
Liberal	P. McCallion	755	42.3%
Labour	R. Didham	607	34.0%
Conservative	H. Morris	421	23.6%
Turnout			44.9%
Liberal gain from Labour			

=== Tye Green ===
Location of Tye Green ward

Tye Green
Party	Candidate	Votes	%
Labour	B. Downie	969	76.0%
Liberal	J. Wilson	306	24.0%
Turnout			32.7%
Labour hold			
