= Harlow Civic Centre =

Municipal building in Harlow, Essex, England

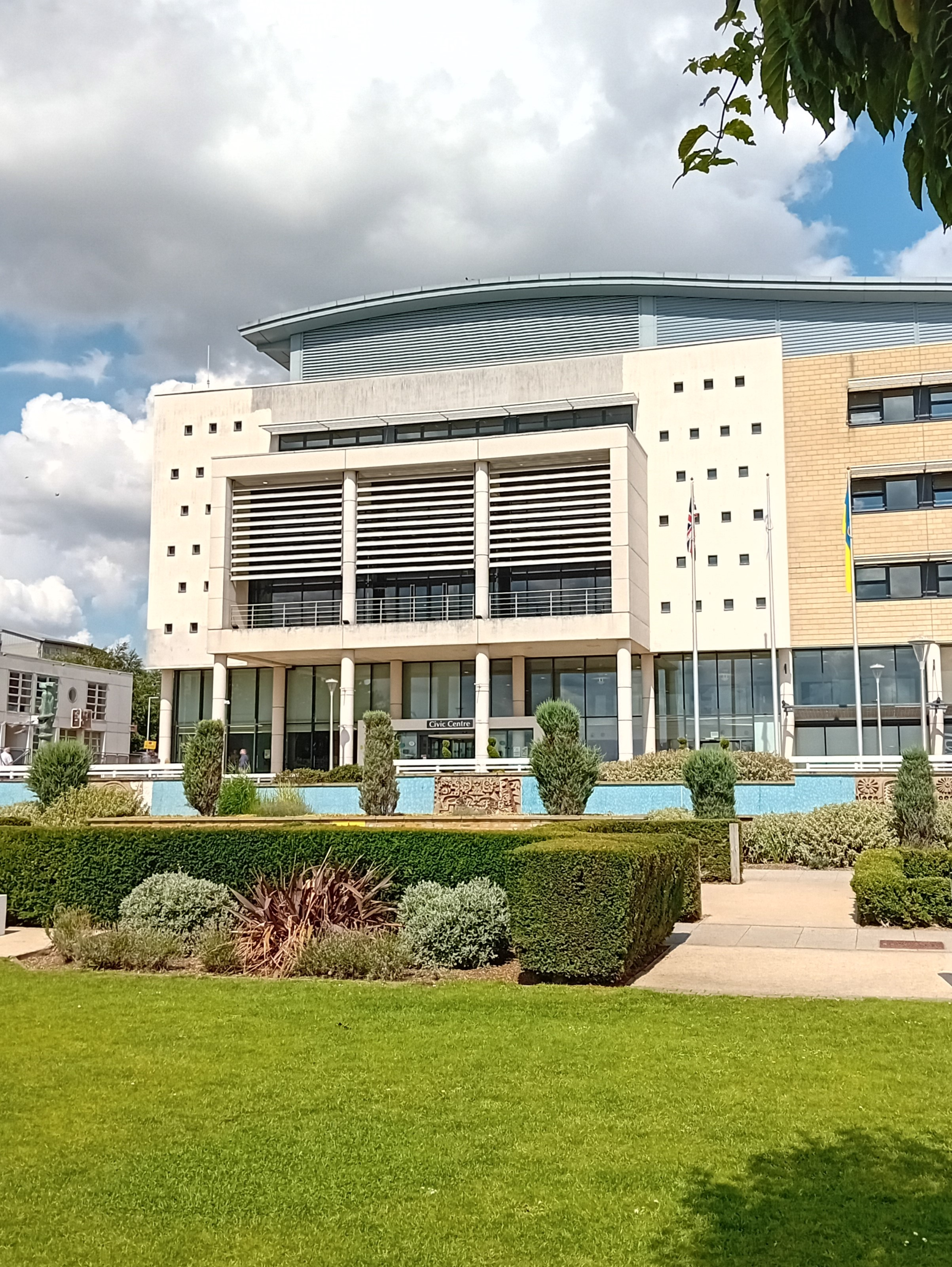
- The building in 2023

- Shown in Essex
- 51.7676°N 0.0938°E
- Location: Water Gardens, Harlow

History
- Built: 2004

Site notes
- Architect: Benoy Architects
- Architectural style: Modern style

Harlow Civic Centre is a municipal building in Harlow, a town in Essex, in England. It is the offices and meeting place of Harlow District Council.

== History ==
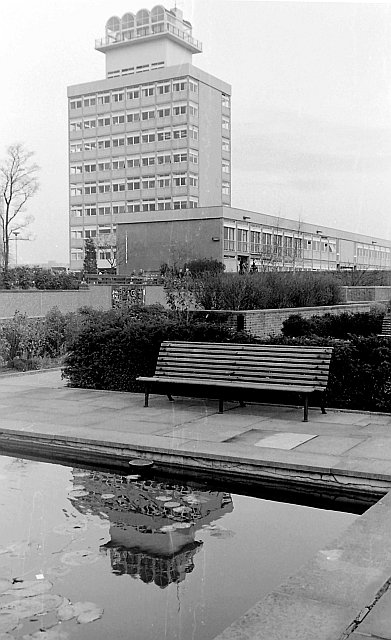
The old Harlow Town Hall

After Harlow was designated as a new town on 25 March 1947, the new Harlow Development Corporation commissioned its own offices, Adams House on the east side of the Market Square. A simple, three storey office block, it was designed by a Manchester-born architect, John Graham, and completed in the early 1950s.

Harlow became an urban district in 1955, and the new council was initially accommodated at Netteswell Hall and Netteswell House, on Park Lane. However, the new council leaders needed a permanent meeting place and the site they chose was on the south side of Cross Street in an area known as The High. The new town hall was designed by Sir Frederick Gibberd in the modern style, built in concrete and was officially opened by Lord Attlee in 1960. The design involved a nine-storey tower with a rooftop viewing room which was designed by John Graham. Gibberd had originally wanted the tower to be at least 15 storeys high but cost constraints did not allow that.

By the early 21st century, the town hall was becoming increasingly dilapidated and civic leaders decided to demolish it, and to commission a new mixed-use complex involving a retail mall and new civic offices. The site selected incorporated the footprint of the old town hall but also extended south towards a landscaped area, which contained concrete lined pools known as the Water Gardens. The old town hall was demolished in 2002. The Water Gardens, which contained a series of sculptures by Henry Moore, had to be severely truncated to accommodate the new development.

The new complex was designed by Benoy Architects in the modern style, built in concrete and glass and was officially opened by Prince Richard, Duke of Gloucester on 19 May 2004. The design involved an asymmetrical main frontage facing south onto the gardens. The civic centre was at the west end of the complex and featured a three bay rectangular portico formed by columns supporting a balcony and a series of huge louvres on the first floor. Internally, the principal room was the council chamber, located behind the louvres. The proclamation of King Charles III was read out from the balcony on 11 September 2022.

Works of art in the civic centre include a painting by André Verlon entitled "Barrage".
