= 2018 Harlow District Council election =

UK local government election

- 3 May 2018

11 of the 33 seats to Harlow District Council 17 seats needed for a majority
	First party	Second party	Third party
Party	Labour	Conservative	UKIP
Seats before	19	12	2
Seats won	6	5	0
Seats after	20	13	0
Seat change	▲1	▲1	▼2
Popular vote	7,767	8,325	984
Percentage	43.4%	46.5%	5.5%
- Map showing the results of contested wards in the 2018 Harlow District Council elections.
Council control before election
Labour
Council control after election
Labour

The 2018 Harlow District Council election took place on 3 May 2018 to elect members of Harlow District Council in Essex. This was on the same day as other local elections. Labour increased their majority on the council by gaining one seat.

After the election, the composition of the council was:

- Labour 20
- Conservative 13

== Results summary ==
2018 Harlow District Council election
Party	Seats	Gains	Losses	Net gain/loss	Seats %	Votes %	Votes	+/−
Labour	20	1	0	▲1	54.5	43.4	7,767	▲3.3
Conservative	13	1	0	▲1	45.5	46.5	8,325	▲10.7
UKIP	0	0	2	▼2	0.0	5.5	984	▼15.5
Harlow Alliance Party	0	0	0	Steady	0.0	2.4	426	New
Liberal Democrats	0	0	0	Steady	0.0	2.2	395	▼1.4
Total	33						17,897	
Labour hold								

== Ward results ==
=== Bush Fair ===
Location of Bush Fair ward

Bush Fair
Party	Candidate	Votes	%	±%
Labour	Eugenie Harvey	733	45.0	▼1.7
Conservative	Andreea Hardware	634	38.9	▲17.1
UKIP	Dan Long	180	11.0	▼14.1
Liberal Democrats	Christopher Robins	82	5.0	▼1.5
Majority		99	6.1	▼15.5
Turnout		1,629	29.1	
Labour gain from UKIP		Swing	▼9.4	

=== Church Langley ===
Location of Church Langley ward

Church Langley
Party	Candidate	Votes	%	±%
Conservative	Tony Hall	1,203	68.3	▲13.2
Labour	Jake Shepherd	451	25.7	▲6.4
UKIP	Pat Long	103	5.9	▼19.8
Majority		752	42.6	
Turnout		1,757	27.9	
Conservative hold		Swing	▲3.4	

=== Great Parndon ===
Location of Great Parndon ward

Great Parndon ward, 3 May 2018
Party	Candidate	Votes	%	±%
Conservative	Shona Johnson	877	53.8	▲9.1
Labour	Allan Jolley	560	34.4	▲2.0
Harlow Alliance Party	Nicholas Taylor	193	11.8	New
Majority		317	19.4	
Turnout		1,630		
Conservative gain from UKIP		Swing	▲3.6	

=== Harlow Common ===
Location of Harlow Common ward

Harlow Common ward, 3 May 2018
Party	Candidate	Votes	%	±%
Labour	Margaret Hulcoop	813	47.6	▲8.6
Conservative	Tom Reynolds	639	37.4	▲4.0
Harlow Alliance Party	Mike Carr	149	8.7	New
UKIP	Anita Long	106	6.2	▼17.2
Majority		174	10.2	
Turnout		1,707		
Labour hold		Swing	▲2.3	

=== Little Parndon and Hare Street ===
Location of Little Parndon and Hare Street ward

Little Parndon and Hare Street ward, 3 May 2018
Party	Candidate	Votes	%	±%
Labour	Tony Durcan	965	60.4	▲5.6
Conservative	Stevie Souter	533	33.3	▲7.1
UKIP	Patsy Long	101	6.3	▼13.1
Majority		432	27.1	
Turnout		1,599		
Labour hold		Swing	▼0.8	

=== Mark Hall ===
Location of Mark Hall ward

Mark Hall ward, 3 May 2018
Party	Candidate	Votes	%	±%
Labour	Danny Purton	761	49.9	▲5.6
Conservative	Andrew Colley	503	38.7	▲14.6
UKIP	Abbey Ward	140	6.2	▼20.3
Liberal Democrats	Lesley Rideout	121	4.2	▼1.9
Majority		190	12.2	
Turnout		1,554		
Labour hold		Swing	▼4.5	

=== Nettleswell ===
Location of Netteswell ward

Nettleswell ward, 3 May 2018
Party	Candidate	Votes	%	±%
Labour	Mike Danvers	791	50.9	▲3.2
Conservative	Jake Brackstone	601	38.7	▲15.0
UKIP	Marian Lestrange	97	6.2	▼16.8
Liberal Democrats	Robert Thurston	65	4.2	▼1.5
Majority		190	12.2	
Turnout		1,554		
Labour hold		Swing	▼5.9	

=== Old Harlow ===
Location of Old Harlow ward

Old Harlow ward, 3 May 2018
Party	Candidate	Votes	%	±%
Conservative	Joel Charles	1,303	65.6	▲19.3
Labour	Liam Kerrigan	586	29.1	▼4.9
Liberal Democrats	Christopher Millington	127	6.3	▲2.8
Majority		717	35.5	
Turnout		2,016		
Conservative hold		Swing	▲12.1	

=== Staple Tye ===
Location of Staple Tye ward

Staple Tye ward, 3 May 2018
Party	Candidate	Votes	%	±%
Conservative	Michael Hardware	574	44.1	▲9.1
Labour	Laura McAlpine	573	44.0	▲2.4
UKIP	Mark Gough	154	11.8	▼11.3
Majority		1	0.1	
Turnout		1,301		
Conservative gain from UKIP		Swing	▲3.4	

=== Summers & Kingsmoor ===
Location of Summers and Kingsmoor ward

Summers & Kingsmoor ward, 3 May 2018
Party	Candidate	Votes	%	±%
Conservative	Nicholas Churchill	907	57.2	▲11.1
Labour	Aiden O'Dell	678	42.8	▲9.2
Majority		229	14.4	
Turnout		1,585		
Conservative hold		Swing	▲1.0	

=== Toddbrook ===
Location of Toddbrook ward

Toddbrook ward, 3 May 2018
Party	Candidate	Votes	%	±%
Labour	Tony Edwards	856	53.7	▲3.2
Conservative	Peter Lamb	551	34.6	▲9.7
UKIP	Chris Ward	103	6.5	▼18.2
Harlow Alliance Party	Alan Leverett	64	5.3	New
Majority		305	19.1	
Turnout		1,594		
Labour hold		Swing	▼3.3	

== By-elections between 2018 and 2019 ==
=== Bush Fair ===
A by-election was held in Bush Fair on 8 November 2018 after the resignation of Labour councillor Ian Beckett. The seat was held for Labour by Joseph Dunne.

Bush Fair by-election 8 November 2018
Party	Candidate	Votes	%	±%
Labour	Joseph Dunne	543	45.0	▲5.6
Conservative	Andreea Hardware	460	38.1	▲6.0
UKIP	Anita Long	103	8.5	▼15.4
Harlow Alliance	Nicholas Taylor	63	5.2	▲5.2
Liberal Democrats	Lesley Rideout	39	3.2	▼1.4
Majority		83	6.9	
Turnout		1,213	21.77	
Labour hold		Swing		

=== Nettleswell ===
A by-election was held in Nettleswell on 8 November 2018 after the resignation of Labour councillor Waida Forman. The seat was held for Labour by Shannon Jezzard.

Netteswell by-election 8 November 2018
Party	Candidate	Votes	%	±%
Labour	Shannon Jezzard	497	50.2	▲2.5
Conservative	Jake Brackstone	254	25.6	▲2.0
Harlow Alliance	Alan Leverett	99	10.0	▲10.0
UKIP	Mark Gough	98	9.9	▼13.1
Liberal Democrats	Robert Thurston	43	4.3	▼1.4
Majority		243	24.6	
Turnout		993	18.14	
Labour hold		Swing		

=== Toddbrook ===
A by-election was held in Toddbrook on 13 December 2018 after the resignation of Labour councillor Karen Clempner. The seat was held for Labour by Frances Mason.

Toddbrook by-election 13 December 2018
Party	Candidate	Votes	%	±%
Labour	Frances Mason	464	51.1	▲5.4
Conservative	Tom Reynolds	311	34.3	▲0.9
UKIP	Mark Gough	89	9.8	▼11.2
Liberal Democrats	Robert Thurston	44	4.8	▲4.8
Majority		243	16.8	
Turnout		153	16.69	
Labour hold		Swing		
