= 2022 Harlow District Council election =

- 5 May 2022

12 out of 32 seats to Harlow District Council 17 seats needed for a majority

	First party	Second party
Party	Conservative	Labour
Last election	20 seats, 60.0%	12 seats, 35.6%
Seats won	7	5
Seats after	22	10
Seat change	▲2	▼2
Popular vote	9,525	7,938
Percentage	48.1%	40.1%
Swing	▼11.9%	▲4.5%
- Winner of each seat at the 2022 Harlow District Council election
Council control before election
Conservative
Council control after election
Conservative

The 2022 Harlow District Council election took place on 5 May 2022 to elect members of Harlow District Council in Essex. This was on the same day as other local elections.

== Results summary ==
2022 Harlow District Council election
Party	This election				Full council			This election		
Party	Candidates	Seats	Net	Seats %	Other	Total	Total %	Votes	Votes %	+/−
Conservative	{{{candidates}}}	7	▲2	58.3	15	22	68.8	9,525	48.1	-11.9
Labour	{{{candidates}}}	5	▼2	41.7	5	10	31.3	7,938	40.1	+4.5
Green	{{{candidates}}}	0	Steady	0.0	0	0	0.0	1,779	9.0	N/A
Harlow Alliance	{{{candidates}}}	0	Steady	0.0	0	0	0.0	461	2.3	+0.3
Liberal Democrats	{{{candidates}}}	0	Steady	0.0	0	0	0.0	47	0.2	±0.0
TUSC	{{{candidates}}}	0	Steady	0.0	0	0	0.0	46	0.2	±0.0

== Ward results ==
=== Bush Fair ===
Bush Fair
Party	Candidate	Votes	%	±%
Conservative	Marco Lorenzini	678	44.8	−4.1
Labour Co-op	Kay Morrison	674	44.5	−1.0
Green	Jennifer Steadman	116	7.7	N/A
Liberal Democrats	William Tennison	47	3.1	−1.5
Majority		4	0.3	
Turnout		1,522	27.6	
Conservative gain from Labour		Swing	▼1.6	

=== Church Langley ===
Church Langley
Party	Candidate	Votes	%	±%
Conservative	Nicola Purse	1,231	69.6	−8.5
Labour	Edward Ray	370	20.9	−1.0
Green	Bengeman White	168	9.5	N/A
Majority		861	48.7	
Turnout		1,778	27.7	
Conservative hold		Swing	▼3.8	

=== Great Parndon ===
Great Parndon
Party	Candidate	Votes	%	±%
Conservative	Stephen Lemay	864	52.2	−6.7
Labour	Philip Waite	494	29.8	+3.6
Harlow Alliance	Nicholas Taylor	297	17.9	+3.1
Majority		370	22.4	
Turnout		1,659	34.1	
Conservative hold		Swing	▼5.2	

=== Harlow Common ===
Harlow Common
Party	Candidate	Votes	%	±%
Conservative	Stacy Seales	801	48.1	−9.8
Labour	Margaret Hulcoop	750	45.0	+2.9
Green	Sally Hardcastle	116	7.0	N/A
Majority		51	3.1	
Turnout		1,674	30.8	
Conservative gain from Labour		Swing	▼6.4	

=== Little Parndon & Hare Street ===
Little Parndon & Hare Street
Party	Candidate	Votes	%	±%
Labour	Anthony Durcan	925	51.4	−0.7
Conservative	Danielle Brown	687	38.2	−9.7
Green	Klara Bow	186	10.3	N/A
Majority		238	13.2	
Turnout		1,807	27.8	
Labour hold		Swing	▲4.5	

=== Mark Hall ===
Mark Hall
Party	Candidate	Votes	%	±%
Labour	Alain Shears	673	43.3	+11.4
Conservative	John Steer	634	40.8	−20.3
Green	Jamie Gilbert	248	15.9	N/A
Majority		39	2.5	
Turnout		1,561	29.4	
Labour hold		Swing	▲15.9	

=== Netteswell ===
Netteswell
Party	Candidate	Votes	%	±%
Labour	James Griggs	791	49.9	+8.6
Conservative	Jacob Daniels	625	39.5	−12.8
Green	Sarah Jarvis	168	10.6	N/A
Majority		166	10.4	
Turnout		1,587	27.7	
Labour hold		Swing	▲10.7	

=== Old Harlow ===
Old Harlow
Party	Candidate	Votes	%	±%
Conservative	Joel Charles	1,266	52.9	−13.2
Labour	Liam Kerrigan	698	29.1	+1.7
Green	Yasmin Gergory	383	16.0	N/A
TUSC	Paul Lenihan	46	1.9	+0.3
Majority		568	23.5	
Turnout		2,406	29.3	
Conservative hold		Swing	▼7.5	

=== Staple Tye ===
Staple Tye
Party	Candidate	Votes	%	±%
Conservative	Michael Hardware	717	52.5	−5.8
Labour Co-op	Stefan Mullard	535	39.1	+2.9
Green	Lewis Brand	115	8.4	N/A
Majority		602	13.4	
Turnout		1,370	26.7	
Conservative hold		Swing	▼4.4	

=== Sumners & Kingsmoor ===
Sumners & Kingsmoor
Party	Candidate	Votes	%	±%
Conservative	Nicholas Churchill	763	51.7	−10.9
Labour	Aiden O'Dell	474	32.1	+6.3
Harlow Alliance	Alan Leverett	164	11.1	−0.5
Green	Terry Patrick	76	5.1	N/A
Majority		289	19.6	
Turnout		1,480	29.2	
Conservative hold		Swing	▼8.6	

=== Toddbrook ===
Toddbrook (2 seats due to by-election)
Party	Candidate	Votes	%	±%
Labour	Anthony Edwards	798	49.5	+1.5
Labour	Daniella Pritchard	756	46.9	−1.0
Conservative	Emma Ghaffari	659	40.9	−12.4
Conservative	Emma Hellett	600	37.2	−13.6
Green	Julia Taylor	203	12.6	N/A
Turnout		1,611	29.1	
Labour hold		Swing		
Labour hold		Swing		

== By-elections ==
=== Bush Fair ===
Bush Fair: 23 June 2022
Party	Candidate	Votes	%	±%
Labour Co-op	Kay Morrison	594	47.1	+2.6
Conservative	Emma Ghaffari	482	38.2	−6.6
Green	Jennifer Steadman	106	8.4	+0.7
Harlow Alliance	Nicholas Taylor	76	6.0	N/A
Majority		112	8.9	
Turnout		1,261	23.0	
Labour Co-op gain from Conservative				
