= Chris Vince =

British Labour Co-op politician

Chris Vince MP
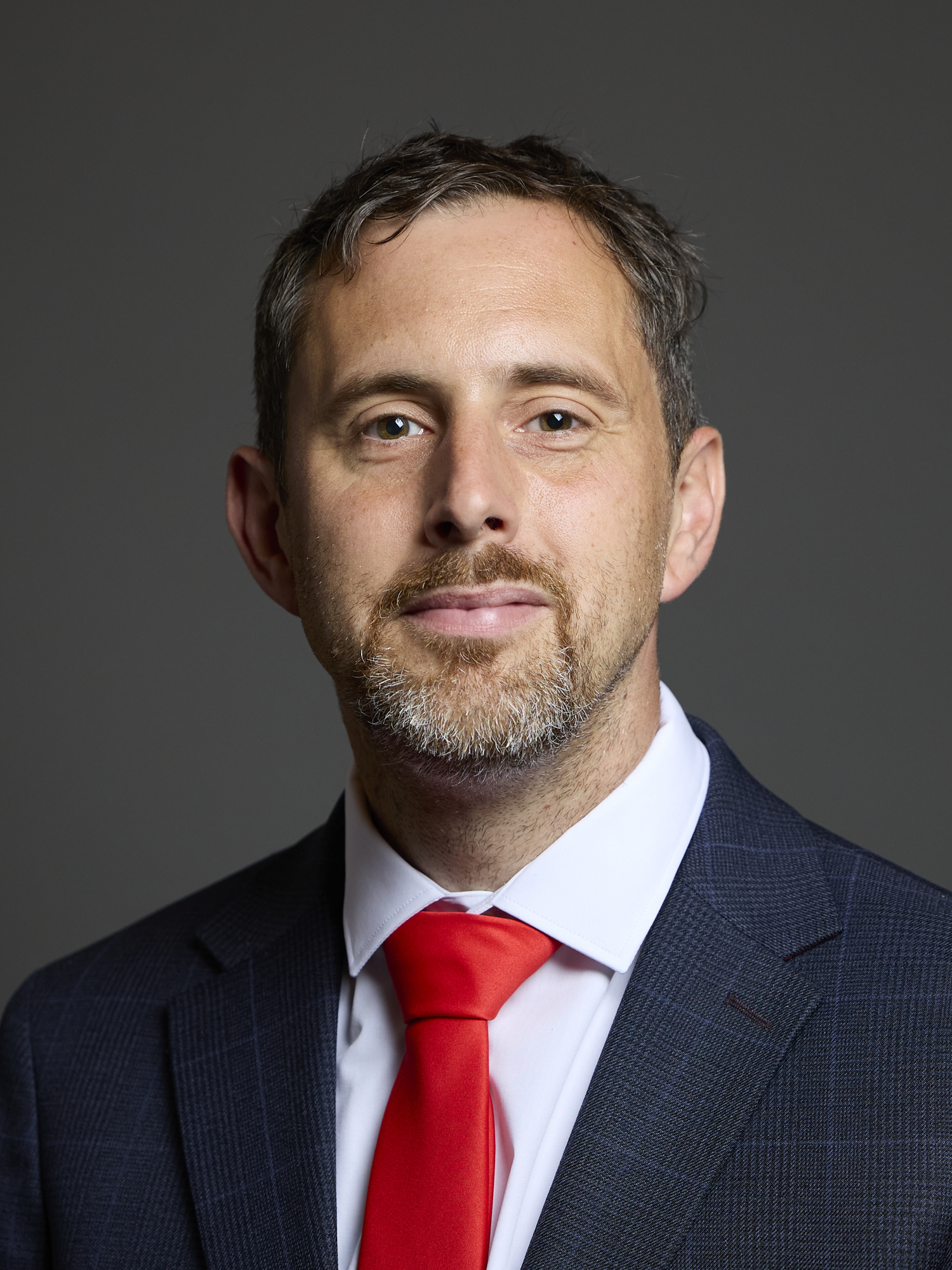
- Official portrait, 2024

Member of Parliament for Harlow
- Incumbent
- Assumed office 4 July 2024
- Preceded by: Robert Halfon
- Majority: 2,504 (5.8%)

Harlow District Councillor for Little Parndon and Town Centre Little Parndon and Hare Street (2018–2024)
- In office 8 March 2018 – 2 August 2024
- Preceded by: Jon Clempner
- Succeeded by: Linda Clark

Personal details
- Born: Christopher John Vince; 24 June 1983 (age 43) Chelmsford, Essex, England
- Party: Labour and Co-operative

Christopher John Vince (born 24 June 1983) is a British Labour Co-op politician who has served as Member of Parliament (MP) for Harlow since 2024. He previously served as a Harlow District Councillor for Little Parndon and Town Centre ward from 2018 to 2024 and the head of Harlow's Labour group from 2021 to 2024.

== Early life and education ==
Vince was born on 24 June 1983 and grew up in Chelmsford, Essex. He worked as a maths teacher until his election to Parliament.

== Political career ==
Vince stood as the Labour Party candidate for Chelmsford in the 2015 general election, where he lost to the Conservative incumbent Simon Burns by a margin of 18,250 votes. He then stood for Essex Police and Crime Commissioner in 2016, where he finished third below the UKIP candidate Bob Spink and the Conservative winner Roger Hirst. He then contested the Great Baddow seat on the Essex County Council in 2017, finishing third behind the Liberal Democrat candidate and the Conservative incumbent. The following month, he contested the Chelmsford seat in the 2017 general election, finishing second below the Conservative winner Vicky Ford by a margin of 13,572 votes.

In March 2018, Vince replaced former Harlow Labour leader Jon Clempner, who had resigned following an alleged campaign against him by the organisation Momentum, as Labour candidate for the Harlow District Council by-election for the Little Parndon and Hare Street ward and won by a margin of 387 votes. In the 2019 European Parliament election (the last before Brexit), he was the second of seven candidates on Labour's party-list for the East of England constituency, though none of the Labour candidates were elected. That December, Vince contested Hertford and Stortford in the 2019 general election, finishing second behind the Conservative candidate Julie Marson by a margin of 14,092 votes.

In the 2021 Harlow District Council election, he won re-election to his Little Parndon and Hare Street seat by a margin of 82 votes. That same month, he finished fourth out of eight candidates for the Harlow West seat in the Essex County Council election as well as finishing second in the Essex Police, Fire and Crime Commissioner election. Vince was then selected to lead the Harlow Labour group, a role he resigned from in May 2024 following the party losing its majority on the council. In the 2024 District Council election, Vince was again re-elected to the now-renamed Little Parndon and Town Centre seat, resigning the seat three months later after winning the Harlow parliamentary constituency from the Conservatives in the 2024 general election with a majority of 2,504 votes.

On 20 May 2026, he was appointed Parliamentary Private Secretary to the Ministry of Housing, Communities and Local Government.

== Electoral performance ==
=== House of Commons ===
General election 2024: Harlow
Party	Candidate	Votes	%	±%
Labour Co-op	Chris Vince	16,313	37.6	+8.3
Conservative	Hannah Ellis	13,809	31.8	−32.8
Reform	Malcolm Featherstone	9,461	21.8	New
Green	Yasmin Gregory	2,267	5.2	+4.9
Liberal Democrats	Riad Mannan	1,350	3.1	−2.8
UKIP	Lois Perry	157	0.4	New
Majority		2,504	5.8	
Turnout		43,357	58.2	–6.3
Labour Co-op gain from Conservative		Swing	+20.6	

General election 2019: Hertford and Stortford
Party	Candidate	Votes	%	±%
Conservative	Julie Marson	33,712	56.1	–4.2
Labour	Chris Vince	14,092	23.4	–5.2
Liberal Democrats	Chris Lucas	8,596	14.3	+6.2
Green	Lucy Downes	2,705	4.5	+1.5
UKIP	Alistair Lindsay	681	1.1	New
Independent	Brian Percival	308	0.5	New
Majority		19,620	32.7	+1.0
Turnout		60,094	72.9	+0.1
Conservative hold		Swing	+0.5	

General election 2017: Chelmsford
Party	Candidate	Votes	%	±%
Conservative	Vicky Ford	30,525	53.7	+2.2
Labour	Chris Vince	16,953	29.8	+12.2
Liberal Democrats	Stephen Robinson	6,916	12.2	+0.3
UKIP	Nigel Carter	1,645	2.9	−11.3
Green	Reza Hossain	821	1.4	−2.1
Majority		13,572	23.9	−10.0
Turnout		56,860	70.2	+1.7
Conservative hold		Swing	−5.0	

General election 2015: Chelmsford
Party	Candidate	Votes	%	±%
Conservative	Simon Burns	27,732	51.5	+5.3
Labour	Chris Vince	9,482	17.6	+6.6
UKIP	Mark Gough	7,652	14.2	+11.4
Liberal Democrats	Stephen Robinson	6,394	11.9	−24.9
Green	Angela Thomson	1,892	3.5	+2.6
Liberal	Henry Boyle	665	1.2	New
Majority		18,250	33.9	+24.5
Turnout		53,817	68.5	−1.9
Conservative hold		Swing		

=== Essex County Council ===
2021 County Council election: Harlow West (2 seats)
Party	Candidate	Votes	%	±%
Conservative	Michael Hardware	4,848	49.4	+2.7
Conservative	Clive Souter	3,870		
Labour	Daniella Pritchard	3,255	33.2	−7.8
Labour	Chris Vince	2,765		
Harlow Alliance	Nicholas Taylor	764	7.8	New
Harlow Alliance	Alan Leverett	747		New
Liberal Democrats	Christopher Millington	378	3.9	+0.4
Liberal Democrats	Robert Thurston	346		
Turnout		9,807	32.6	+4.3
Conservative hold				
Conservative hold				

2017 County Council election: Great Baddow
Party	Candidate	Votes	%	±%
Conservative	Jenny Chandler	2,306	46.7	+15.5
Liberal Democrats	Chris Shaw	1,718	34.8	+9.0
Labour	Chris Vince	422	8.5	−1.7
UKIP	Jeanette Howes	360	7.3	−22.3
Green	Liz Carlton	134	2.7	−0.6
Majority		588	11.9	+10.3
Turnout		4,939	31.3	+2.0
Conservative hold		Swing	+3.3	

=== Harlow District Council ===
2024 District Council election: Little Parndon and Town Centre (3 seats)
Party	Candidate	Votes	%	±%
Labour	Chris Vince	761	62.7	
Labour	Tony Durcan	710	58.5	
Labour	Maggie Hulcoop	671	55.3	
Conservative	Dan Brown	388	32.0	
Conservative	Geoffrey Longster	349	28.8	
Conservative	Anne Richards	332	27.4	
Green	Klara Bow	187	15.4	
Green	Caroline Schellin-Jolley	133	11.0	
Green	Danielle Kemm	108	8.9	
Turnout		1,365	26.1	
Labour win (new seat)				
Labour win (new seat)				
Labour win (new seat)				

2021 District Council election: Little Parndon and Hare Street
Party	Candidate	Votes	%	±%
Labour	Chris Vince	996	52.1	–4.6
Conservative	Adam Jolles	914	47.9	+23.8
Majority		82	4.2	
Turnout		1,910	29.5	
Labour hold				

2018 Little Parndon and Hare Street by-election
Party	Candidate	Votes	%	±%
Labour	Chris Vince	781	62.2	
Conservative	John Steer	394	31.4	
UKIP	Patsy Long	80	6.4	
Majority		387	30.8	
Turnout		1,255		
Labour hold				

=== Essex Police and Crime Commissioner ===
2021 Essex Police and Crime Commissioner election
Party	Candidate	1st round		2nd round			1st round votesTransfer votes, 2nd round
Party	Candidate	Total	Of round	Transfers	Total	Of round	1st round votesTransfer votes, 2nd round
Conservative	Roger Hirst	235,346	54.0%				
Labour Co-op	Chris Vince	80,832	22.9%				
Liberal Democrats	John Whitehouse	58,131	13.3%				
English Democrat	Robin Tilbrook	42,831	9.8%				
Turnout		436,020					
Conservative hold							

2016 Essex Police and Crime Commissioner election
Party	Candidate	1st round		2nd round			1st round votesTransfer votes, 2nd round
Party	Candidate	Total	Of round	Transfers	Total	Of round	1st round votesTransfer votes, 2nd round
Conservative	Roger Hirst	110,858	33.5%	25,090	135,948	56.7%	
UKIP	Bob Spink	80,832	24.4%	22,960	103,792	43.3%	
Labour	Chris Vince	65,325	19.7%				
Zero Tolerance Policing ex Chief	Martin Terry	43,128	13.0%				
Liberal Democrats	Kevin McNamara	30,804	9.3%				
Turnout		330,947	26.1				
Conservative hold							

Parliament of the United Kingdom
Preceded by Robert Halfon	Member of Parliament for Harlow; 2024–present	Incumbent
