= 1988 Harlow District Council election =

English local election

- 5 May 1988

14 of the 42 seats to Harlow District Council 22 seats needed for a majority
	First party	Second party	Third party
Party	Labour	Conservative	SLD
Last election	37	2	3
Seats before	36	3	3
Seats won	11	2	1
Seats after	35	4	3
Seat change	▼1	▲1	Steady
Popular vote	12,227	6,054	2,022
Percentage	60.1%	29.7%	9.9%
- Map showing the results of contested wards in the 1988 Harlow District Council elections.
Council control before election
Labour
Council control after election
Labour

The 1988 Harlow District Council election took place on 5 May 1988 to elect members of Harlow District Council in Essex, England. This was on the same day as other local elections. The Labour Party retained control of the council.

== Election result ==
1988 Harlow local election result
Party	Seats	Gains	Losses	Net gain/loss	Seats %	Votes %	Votes	+/−
Labour	11	0	1	▼1	78.6	60.1	12,227	▲3.4
Conservative	2	1	0	▲1	14.3	29.7	6,054	▲8.1
SLD	1	0	0	Steady	7.1	9.9	2,022	▼11.8
Independent	0	0	0	Steady	0.0	0.3	58	New

All comparisons in vote share are to the corresponding 1984 election.

== Ward results ==
=== Brays Grove ===
Location of Brays Grove ward

Brays Grove
Party	Candidate	Votes	%
Labour	D. Burnham	835	76.7%
Conservative	D. Messer	254	23.3%
Turnout			33.8%
Labour hold			

=== Great Parndon ===
Location of Great Parndon ward

Great Parndon
Party	Candidate	Votes	%
Conservative	L. Atkins	820	48.5%
Labour	J. Sanders	705	41.7%
SLD	D. Harris	106	6.3%
Independent	S. Ford	58	3.4%
Turnout			51.1%
Conservative hold			

=== Hare Street and Town Centre ===
Location of Hare Street and Town Centre ward

Hare Street and Town Centre
Party	Candidate	Votes	%
Labour	J. Hobbs	758	75.2%
Conservative	D. Groves	250	24.8%
Turnout			35.6%
Labour hold			

=== Kingsmoor ===
Location of Kingsmoor ward

Kingsmoor
Party	Candidate	Votes	%
Conservative	S. Rigden	841	46.0%
Labour	J. Young	820	44.8%
SLD	D. Collins	168	9.2%
Turnout			38.3%
Conservative gain from Labour			

=== Latton Bush ===
Location of Latton Bush ward

Latton Bush
Party	Candidate	Votes	%
Labour	A. Jones	1,052	69.5%
Conservative	S. Cross	461	30.5%
Turnout			36.7%
Labour hold			

=== Little Parndon ===
Location of Little Parndon ward

Little Parndon
Party	Candidate	Votes	%
Labour	D. Condon	975	65.0
Conservative	K. Smart	355	23.7%
SLD	L. Spenceley	171	11.4%
Labour hold			

=== Mark Hall South ===
Location of Mark Hall South ward

Mark Hall South
Party	Candidate	Votes	%
Labour	T. Farr	1,061	69.7%
Conservative	N. Hitch	333	21.9%
SLD	N. Armitage	129	8.5%
Turnout			38.9%
Labour hold			

=== Netteswell East ===
Location of Netteswell East ward

Netteswell East
Party	Candidate	Votes	%
Labour	P. Balbi	727	65.2%
Conservative	M. Rigden	260	23.3%
SLD	V. Scott	128	11.5%
Turnout			38.5%
Labour hold			

=== Netteswell West ===
Location of Netteswell West ward

Netteswell West
Party	Candidate	Votes	%
Labour	M. Coleman	618	64.6%
Conservative	S. Jones	215	22.5%
SLD	S. Herbert	123	12.9%
Turnout			37.7%
Labour hold			

=== Old Harlow ===
Location of Old Harlow ward

Old Harlow
Party	Candidate	Votes	%
Labour	Richard Howitt	1,243	48.7%
Conservative	S. Carter	1,151	45.1%
SLD	P. Barton	156	6.1%
Turnout			55.7%
Labour hold			

=== Passmores ===
Location of Passmores ward

Passmores
Party	Candidate	Votes	%
Labour	J. Rogers	859	61.8%
Conservative	M. Tombs	381	27.4%
SLD	A. Curran	149	10.7%
Turnout			35.0%
Labour hold			

=== Potter Street ===
Location of Potter Street ward

Potter Street
Party	Candidate	Votes	%
Labour	R. Brown	970	71.5%
Conservative	D. Fleming	244	18.0%
SLD	S. Ward	142	10.5%
Turnout			41.2%
Labour hold			

=== Stewards ===
Location of Stewards ward

Stewards
Party	Candidate	Votes	%
SLD	S. Curran	750	50.7%
Labour	C. Downing	560	37.9%
Conservative	K. Jones	168	11.4%
Turnout			37.6%
SLD hold			

=== Tye Green ===
Location of Tye Green ward

Tye Green
Party	Candidate	Votes	%
Labour	V. Phelps	1,044	76.5%
Conservative	B. Hill	321	23.5%
Turnout			36.9%
Labour hold			
