= 2021 Harlow District Council election =

← 2019	7 May 2021	2022 →
Party	Labour	Conservative
- Map showing the results of the 2021 Harlow District Council election
Council control before election
Labour
Council control after election
Conservative

The 2021 Harlow District Council election took place on 6 May 2021 to elect members of Harlow District Council in Essex. This was on the same day as other local elections. Control of the council was gained by the Conservative Party with 20 seats.

There are 11 wards, each with three councillors. One councillor for each ward was elected with additional by-elections for councillors in Church Langley and Toddbrook wards. Thus there were 13 seats being elected.

After the election, the composition of the council was:

- Conservative 20
- Labour 12

with one seat vacant. Sitting Councillor Danny Purton had died on 30 April during the election campaign.

== Results summary ==
2021 Harlow Borough Council election
Party	This election			Full council			This election		
Party	Seats	Net	Seats %	Other	Total	Total %	Votes	Votes %	+/−
Conservative	12	▲7	92.3	8	20	62.5	13,948	60.0	+24.6
Labour	1	▼8	7.7	11	12	37.5	8,288	35.6	-3.2
Liberal Democrats	0	Steady	0.0	0	0	0.0	522	2.2	-0.8
Harlow Alliance	0	Steady	0.0	0	0	0.0	463	2.0	-6.2
TUSC	0	Steady	0.0	0	0	0.0	39	0.2	New

One seat was vacant.

== Ward results ==
=== Bush Fair ===
Location of Bush Fair ward

Bush Fair
Party	Candidate	Votes	%	±%
Conservative	Dan Swords	963	48.9	▲18.6
Labour	Mark Ingall	916	45.5	▼3.2
Liberal Democrats	William Tennison	91	4.6	▼1.8
Majority		47	2.4	
Turnout		1,970	35.27	
Conservative gain from Labour		Swing		

=== Church Langley ===
Location of Church Langley ward

Church Langley
Party	Candidate	Votes	%	±%
Conservative	Simon Carter	1,429	80.7	▲26.4
Conservative	Nicky Purse	1,370	77.4	▲23.1
Labour	Rhiannon Jenkins	400	22.6	▼1.7
Labour	Jake Shepherd	331	18.7	▼5.6
Turnout		1,770	31.87%	
Conservative hold				
Conservative hold				

=== Great Parndon ===
Location of Great Parndon ward

Great Parndon
Party	Candidate	Votes	%	±%
Conservative	Eddie Johnson	1,044	58.9	▲13.0
Labour	Daniella Pritchard	464	26.2	▲0.1
Harlow Alliance Party	Nicholas Taylor	262	14.8	▼13.2
Majority		580	24.6	
Turnout		1,770	35.98	
Conservative hold		Swing		

=== Harlow Common ===
Location of Harlow Common ward

Harlow Common
Party	Candidate	Votes	%	±%
Conservative	James Leppard	1,116	57.9	▲20.5
Labour	Emma Toal	812	42.1	▼5.5
Majority		304	15.8	
Turnout		1,928	35.72	
Conservative gain from Labour		Swing		

=== Little Parndon and Hare Street ===
Little Parndon and Hare Street
Party	Candidate	Votes	%	±%
Labour	Chris Vince	996	52.1	▼4.6
Conservative	Adam Jolles	914	47.9	▲23.8
Majority		82	4.2	
Turnout		1,910	29.5	
Labour hold		Swing		

=== Mark Hall ===
Mark Hall
Party	Candidate	Votes	%	±%
Conservative	Matthew Saggers	1,033	61.1	▲37.9
Labour	Lanie Shears	539	31.9	▼10.6
Liberal Democrats	Lesley Rideout	120	7.1	▼2.5
Majority		494	29.2	
Turnout		1,692	32.1	
Conservative gain from Labour		Swing		

=== Netteswell ===
Netteswell
Party	Candidate	Votes	%	±%
Conservative	Colleen Morrison	845	52.3	▲27.4
Labour	Kay Morrison	668	41.3	▼4.0
Liberal Democrats	Robert Thurston	103	6.4	▼12.4
Majority		177	11.0	
Turnout		1,616	28.3	
Conservative gain from Labour		Swing		

=== Old Harlow ===
Old Harlow
Party	Candidate	Votes	%	±%
Conservative	Michael Garnett	1,650	66.1	▲13.7
Labour	George Elcock	688	27.5	▼3.3
Liberal Democrats	Christopher Robins	121	4.8	N/A
TUSC	Paul Lenihan	39	1.6	N/A
Majority		962	38.6	
Turnout		2,498	32.9	
Conservative hold		Swing		

=== Staple Tye ===
Staple Tye
Party	Candidate	Votes	%	±%
Conservative	Alastair Gunn	912	58.3	▲26.6
Labour	Stefan Mullard	566	36.2	▼4.3
Liberal Democrats	Christopher Millington	87	5.6	N/A
Majority		346	22.1	
Turnout		1,565	30.9	
Conservative gain from Labour		Swing		

=== Sumners and Kingsmoor ===
Sumners and Kingsmoor
Party	Candidate	Votes	%	±%
Conservative	Russell Perrin	1,089	62.6	▲21.7
Labour	Aiden O'Dell	449	25.8	▼4.6
Harlow Alliance	Alan Leverett	201	11.6	▼17.1
Majority		640	36.8	
Turnout		1,739	33.6	
Conservative hold		Swing		

=== Toddbrook ===
Toddbrook (2 seats due to by-election)
Party	Candidate	Votes	%
Conservative	Ash Malik	810	53.3
Conservative	Gareth Williams	773	50.8
Labour	Herty Adu-Twumwaa	730	48.0
Labour	Phil Waite	729	47.9
Turnout		—	31.4
Conservative gain from Labour			
Conservative gain from Labour			

== By-elections ==
=== Mark Hall ===
Mark Hall: 8 July 2021
Party	Candidate	Votes	%	±%
Conservative	John Steer	549	46.4	
Labour	Kay Morrison	493	41.7	
Green	Jamie Gilbert	86	7.3	
Liberal Democrats	Lesley Rideout	55	4.6	
Majority		56	4.7	
Turnout		1,183	22.3	
Conservative gain from Labour		Swing		
