= 1973 Harlow District Council election =

7 June 1973	1976 →

All 42 seats to Harlow District Council 23 seats needed for a majority
	First party	Second party
Party	Labour	Liberal
Seats won	38	4
Popular vote	10,100	2,426
Percentage	62.9%	15.1%
Council control after election
Labour

The 1973 Harlow District Council election, on 7 June 1973, was the first election to the newly created Harlow District Council. This was on the same day as other local elections. The Local Government Act 1972 stipulated that the elected members were to shadow and eventually take over from the predecessor corporation on 1 April 1974. The election resulted in Labour gaining control of the council.

== Election result ==
1973 Harlow local election result
Party	Seats	Gains	Losses	Net gain/loss	Seats %	Votes %	Votes	+/−
Labour	38				90.5	62.9	10,100	
Liberal	4				9.5	15.1	2,426	
Conservative	0				0.0	16.7	2,685	
Communist	0				0.0	2.7	426	
Independent Labour	0				0.0	2.7	426	

== Ward results ==
=== Brays Grove (3 seats) ===
Brays Grove (3 seats)
Party	Candidate	Votes	%
Labour	B. Evans	669	
Labour	M. Danvers	669	
Labour	E. Wotton	659	
Conservative	G. Groves	216	
Conservative	L. Chapman	204	
Conservative	B. Roberts	190	
Turnout			25.5%

=== Great Parndon (2 seats) ===
Great Parndon (2 seats)
Party	Candidate	Votes	%
Liberal	G. Fallon	536	
Labour	C. Cave	535	
Labour	R. Edey	503	
Liberal	P. Eldridge	426	
Conservative	L. Plumb	332	
Turnout			47.0%

=== Hare Street and Town Centre (3 seats) ===
Hare Street and Town Centre (3 seats)
Party	Candidate	Votes	%
Labour	M. Bach	583	
Labour	J. Arnott	513	
Labour	D. Sharp	504	
Liberal	T. Merryweather	282	
Liberal	S. Ward	277	
Liberal	T. Owen	264	
Turnout			27.7%

=== Kingsmoor (2 seats) ===
Kingsmoor (2 seats)
Party	Candidate	Votes	%
Labour	C. Cackett	526	
Labour	A. Hudson	496	
Conservative	B. Barry	353	
Conservative	D. Luetchford	346	
Turnout			29.3%

=== Latton Bush (3 seats) ===
Latton Bush (3 seats)
Party	Candidate	Votes	%
Labour	E. Myers	841	
Labour	D. Read	815	
Labour	F. Jackson	772	
Conservative	F. Smith	264	
Turnout			28.0%

=== Little Parndon (3 seats) ===
Little Parndon (3 seats)
Party	Candidate	Votes	%
Labour	D. Condon	865	
Labour	G. Newport	821	
Labour	J. Cave	809	
Liberal	C. Merryweather	339	
Liberal	D. Eldridge	335	
Conservative	A. Bezdel	280	
Conservative	F. Wood	273	
Conservative	J. Wood	254	
Turnout			34.5%

=== Mark Hall North (2 seats) ===
Mark Hall North (2 seats)
Party	Candidate	Votes	%
Labour	J. McAlpine	490	
Labour	P. Campbell	453	
Conservative	R. Whyte	216	
Turnout			27.7%

=== Mark Hall South (4 seats) ===
Mark Hall South (4 seats)
Party	Candidate	Votes	%
Labour	S. Anderson	994	
Labour	D. Burnham	935	
Labour	D. Richards	874	
Labour	L. Smith	858	
Conservative	E. Hagger	358	
Conservative	P. Whiteley	346	
Turnout			31.7%

=== Netteswell (5 seats) ===
Netteswell (5 seats)
Party	Candidate	Votes	%
Labour	J. Desormeaux	1,011	
Labour	A. Graham	992	
Labour	R. Morris	985	
Labour	A. Garner	968	
Labour	M. Lawn	963	
Independent Labour	M. Furlong	336	
Turnout			24.6%

=== Old Harlow (3 seats) ===
Old Harlow (3 seats)
Party	Candidate	Votes	%
Labour	B. Jenkins	684	
Labour	E. Albone	684	
Labour	M. Gerrard	672	
Conservative	G. Trimmer	666	
Independent Labour	K. Dawson	90	
Turnout			40.7%

=== Passmores (3 seats) ===
Passmores (3 seats)
Party	Candidate	Votes	%
Labour	T. Farr	566	
Labour	M. Juliff	546	
Labour	J. Moore	489	
Communist	A. Booth	283	
Turnout			21.3%

=== Potter Street (3 seats) ===
Passmores (3 seats)
Party	Candidate	Votes	%
Labour	B. Gibson	737	
Labour	B. Phelps	705	
Labour	R. Bruce	699	
Communist	R. Pulford	143	
Turnout			27.4%

=== Stewards (3 seats) ===
Stewards (3 seats)
Party	Candidate	Votes	%
Liberal	B. Barnes	779	
Liberal	J. Hewitt	774	
Liberal	D. Wright	730	
Labour	R. Collyer	714	
Labour	D. Pugh	677	
Labour	D. Palmer	669	
Turnout			38.4%

=== Tye Green (3 seats) ===
Tye Green (3 seats)
Party	Candidate	Votes	%
Labour	D. Roberts	885	
Labour	A. James	865	
Labour	B. Downie	862	
Liberal	L. Kozlowska	490	
Liberal	J. Wilson	480	
Liberal	K. Leader	473	
Turnout			35.9%
