= Harlow District Council =

English non-metropolitan district council in Essex, England

Type
- Type: Non-metropolitan district

History
- Founded: 1 April 1974

Leadership
- Chair: Andrew Johnson, Conservative since 26 May 2022
- Leader: Dan Swords, Conservative since 25 May 2023
- Managing Director: None (post abolished in 2026)

Structure
- Seats: 33 councillors
- Graph of the party split among 33 seats.
- Political groups: Administration (22) Conservative (22) Other parties (11) Labour (10) Reform (1)
- Length of term: 4 years

Elections
- Voting system: First-past-the-post
- Last election: 7 May 2026

Meeting place
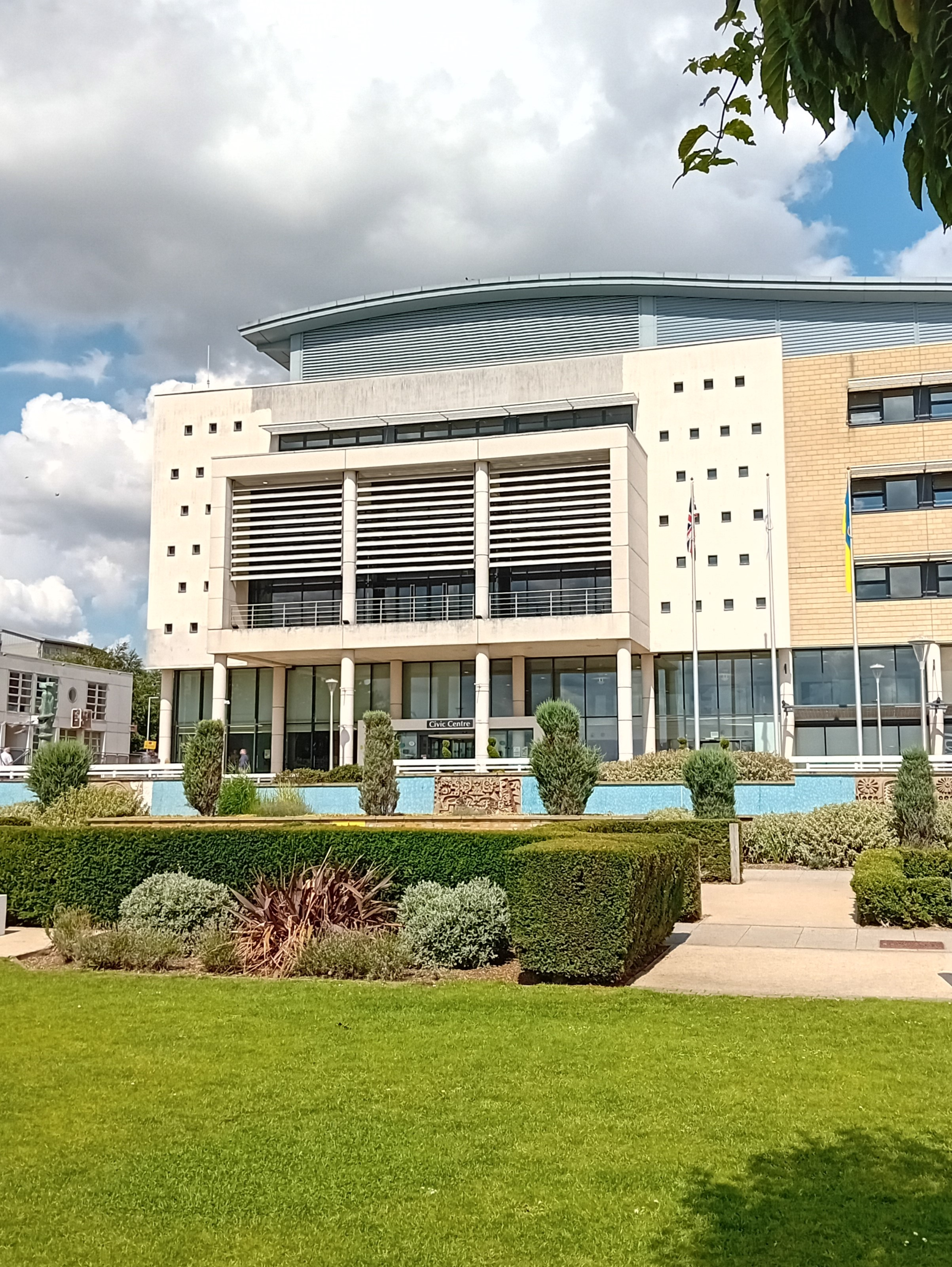
- Civic Centre, The Water Gardens, College Square, Harlow, CM20 1WG

Website
- www.harlow.gov.uk

Harlow District Council is the local authority for Harlow in Essex, England. Harlow is a non-metropolitan district, covering just the town of Harlow itself. The council generally styles itself Harlow Council.

The council has been under Conservative majority control since 2021. It is based at Harlow Civic Centre.

The neighbouring districts are Epping Forest District and East Hertfordshire.

== History ==
Harlow was designated a new town on 25 March 1947. The area for the new town was within the Epping Rural District at the time it was designated, and broadly covered the parishes of Harlow, Latton, Netteswell, Great Parndon, and Little Parndon. As work on the new town got underway the smaller parishes were abolished in stages. On 1 April 1949 Latton was absorbed into Harlow parish and Little Parndon was absorbed into Netteswell parish. On 1 April 1955, the three remaining parishes of Harlow, Great Parndon and Netteswell were merged into a single parish called Harlow, with some adjustments to the boundaries with neighbouring parishes of Epping Upland, Matching, North Weald Bassett, Roydon and Sheering, to bring the development area into a single parish. On the same date the enlarged Harlow parish was made an urban district, making it independent from Epping Rural District.

Urban districts were abolished in 1974 under the Local Government Act 1972. A new non-metropolitan district called Harlow was created covering the same area as the former Harlow Urban District.

In March 2026, the government announced that it would abolish the district in 2028 as part of local government reform across Essex. These proposals were withdrawn in September 2026.

== Governance ==
Harlow Council provides district-level services. County-level services are provided by Essex County Council. There are no civil parishes in Harlow; the entire district is an unparished area.

== Political control ==
The council has been under Conservative control since the 2021 election.

The first election to the council was held in 1973, initially operating as a shadow authority alongside the outgoing authorities until the new arrangements came into effect on 1 April 1974. Political control of the council since 1974 has been as follows:

Party in control	Years
Labour	1974–2002
No overall control	2002–2008
Conservative	2008–2012
Labour	2012–2021
Conservative	2021–present

=== Leadership ===
The leaders of the council since 2008 have been:

Councillor	Party	From	To
Andrew Johnson	Conservative	2008	May 2012
Mark Wilkinson	Labour	24 May 2012	May 2014
Jon Clempner	Labour	12 Jun 2014	11 Jan 2018
Emma Toal	Labour	1 Feb 2018	May 2018
Mark Ingall	Labour	24 May 2018	May 2021
Andrew Johnson	Conservative	20 May 2021	4 Oct 2021
Russell Perrin	Conservative	28 Oct 2021	25 May 2023
Dan Swords	Conservative	25 May 2023	

=== Composition ===
Following the 2026 election,

Party	Councillors
Conservative	22
Labour	10
Reform	1
Total	33

Under current reform plans, Harlow District Council will be abolished in 2028, and its area will become part of a new West Essex unitary authority.

== Premises ==
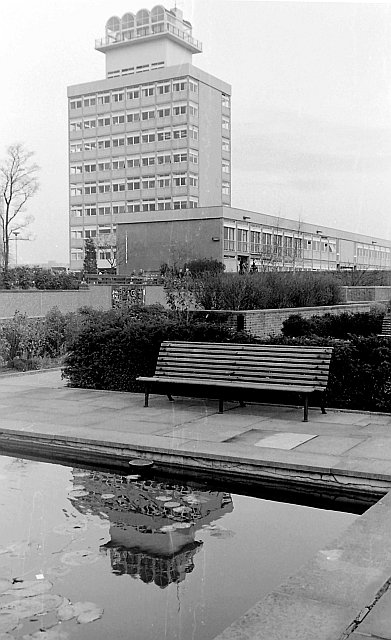
The old Town Hall from the Water Gardens.

The council was initially based at the Town Hall, a tower block on The High in the town centre, which had been completed in 1960 for the old Harlow Urban District Council. In 2004 the council moved to Harlow Civic Centre as part of a wider retail development around the town's Water Gardens. The new building was formally opened in May 2004 by Prince Richard, Duke of Gloucester. The old Town Hall was demolished shortly afterwards.

== Elections ==
Since the last boundary changes in 2024, 33 councillors have been elected from 11 wards. Elections are held three years out of every four for a third of the council at a time. Election to Essex County Council are held in the fourth year of the cycle when there are no district council elections.
