= 1982 United Kingdom local elections =

- 6 May 1982

All 32 London boroughs, all 36 metropolitan boroughs, 103 out of 296 English districts and all 12 Scottish regions
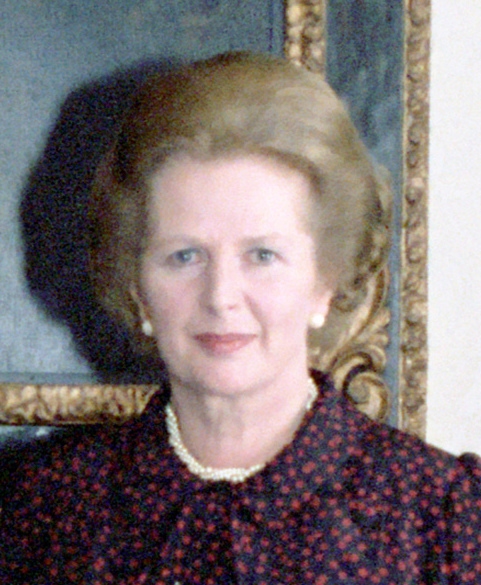

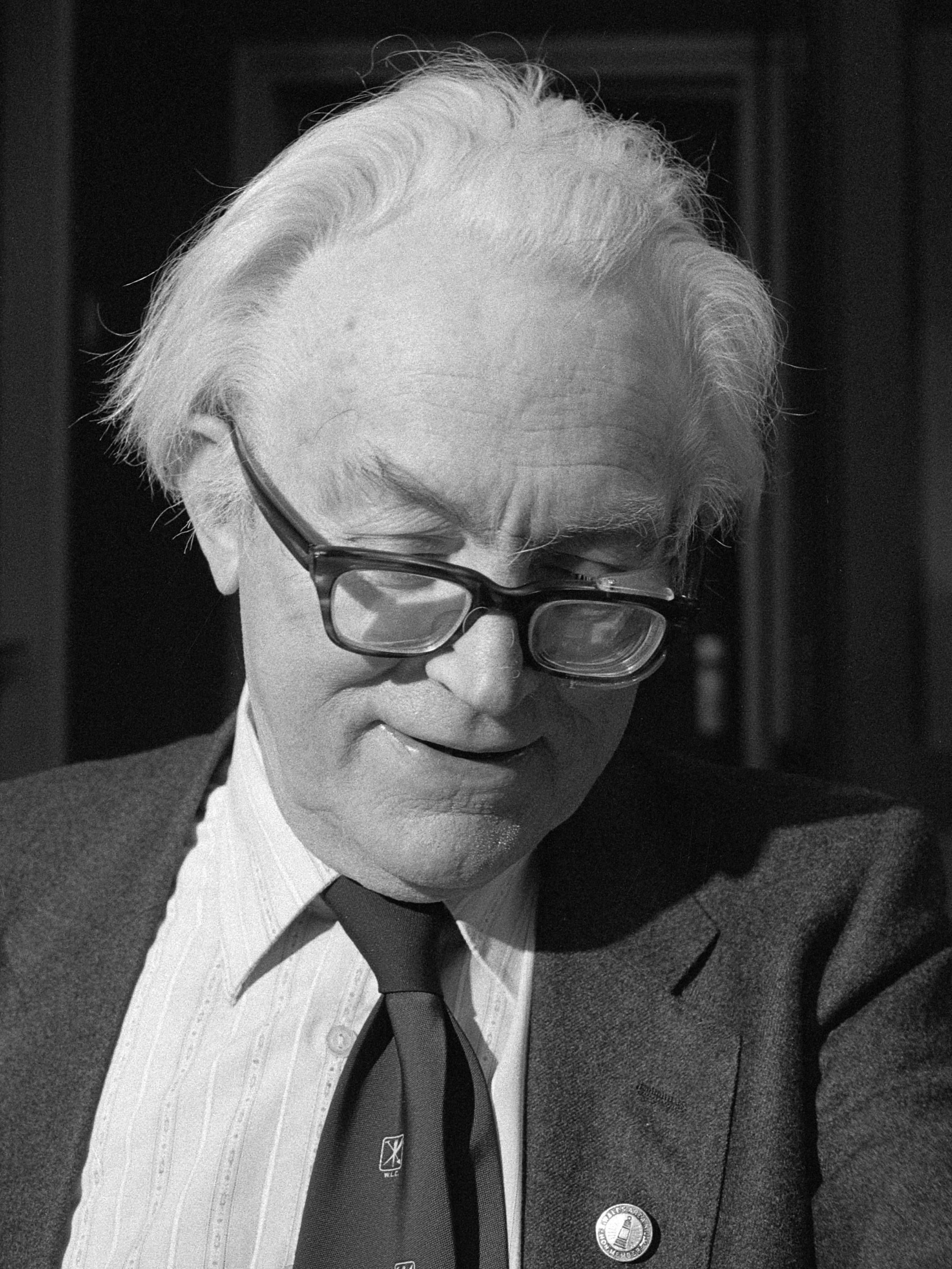

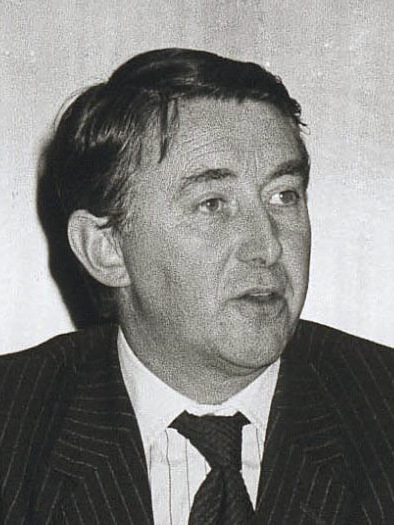
	Majority party	Minority party	Third party
Leader	Margaret Thatcher	Michael Foot	David Steel (Note: and the Gang of Four)
Party	Conservative	Labour	Alliance
Leader since	11 February 1975	10 November 1980	7 July 1976 (Note: & 26 March 1981)
Percentage	40%	29%	27%
Swing	▲2%	▼12%	▲10%
Councillors	10,447	8,774	1,850
Councillors +/-	▼98	▼225	▲395

Local elections were held in the United Kingdom in 1982. The elections coincided with rising popularity of the Conservative government and Prime Minister Margaret Thatcher, which was mostly attributed to the Falklands War. The projected share of the vote was Conservatives 40%, Labour 29%, Liberal-SDP Alliance 27%.

Elections were held in several English boroughs, including all those in London.

The Conservatives held their ground, losing only 98 seats, leaving them with 10,447 seats.

The main opposition Labour Party, under the leadership of Michael Foot, lost 225 seats, finishing with 8,774 councillors.

For the newly formed Liberal-SDP Alliance, the 1982 local elections were the first nationwide electoral test. They gained 395 seats and finished with 1,850 councillors. This meant that the Alliance had almost as many votes as Labour, but Labour still had nearly five times as many councillors.

== England ==
=== London boroughs ===
In all 32 London boroughs the whole council was up for election.

Council	Previous control	Result	Details
Barking and Dagenham	Labour	Labour hold	Details
Barnet	Conservative	Conservative hold	Details
Bexley	Conservative	Conservative hold	Details
Brent	Labour	Labour hold	Details
Bromley	Conservative	Conservative hold	Details
Camden	Labour	Labour hold	Details
Croydon	Conservative	Conservative hold	Details
Ealing	Conservative	Conservative hold	Details
Enfield ‡	Conservative	Conservative hold	Details
Greenwich	Labour	Labour hold	Details
Hackney	Labour	Labour hold	Details
Hammersmith and Fulham	No overall control	No overall control hold	Details
Haringey	Labour	Labour hold	Details
Harrow	Conservative	Conservative hold	Details
Havering	Conservative	Conservative hold	Details
Hillingdon	Conservative	Conservative hold	Details
Hounslow	Labour	Labour hold	Details
Islington	Labour	Labour hold	Details
Kensington and Chelsea	Conservative	Conservative hold	Details
Kingston upon Thames	Conservative	Conservative hold	Details
Lambeth	Labour	No overall control gain	Details
Lewisham	Labour	Labour hold	Details
Merton	Conservative	Conservative hold	Details
Newham	Labour	Labour hold	Details
Redbridge	Conservative	Conservative hold	Details
Richmond upon Thames	Conservative	Conservative hold	Details
Southwark	Labour	Labour hold	Details
Sutton	Conservative	Conservative hold	Details
Tower Hamlets	Labour	Labour hold	Details
Waltham Forest	Labour	No overall control gain	Details
Wandsworth	Conservative	Conservative hold	Details
Westminster	Conservative	Conservative hold	Details

‡ New ward boundaries

=== Metropolitan boroughs ===
==== Whole council ====
In 13 metropolitan boroughs the whole council was up for election.

In 13 boroughs there were new ward boundaries, following electoral boundary reviews by the Local Government Boundary Commission for England.

Council	Previous control	Result	Details
Birmingham ‡	Labour	Conservative gain	Details
Dudley ‡	No overall control	Conservative gain	Details
Gateshead ‡	Labour	Labour hold	Details
Kirklees ‡	Labour	Labour hold	Details
Knowsley ‡	Labour	Labour hold	Details
Manchester ‡	Labour	Labour hold	Details
Newcastle upon Tyne ‡	Labour	Labour hold	Details
North Tyneside ‡	Labour	Labour hold	Details
Salford ‡	Labour	Labour hold	Details
South Tyneside ‡	Labour	Labour hold	Details
Sunderland ‡	Labour	Labour hold	Details
Wakefield ‡	Labour	Labour hold	Details
Wolverhampton ‡	Labour	Labour hold	Details

‡ New ward boundaries

==== Third of council ====
23 metropolitan borough councils had one third of their seats up for election.

Council	Previous control	Result	Details
Barnsley	Labour	Labour hold	Details
Bolton	Labour	Labour hold	Details
Bradford	Labour	No overall control gain	Details
Bury	Conservative	Conservative hold	Details
Calderdale	No overall control	No overall control hold	Details
Coventry	Labour	Labour hold	Details
Doncaster	Labour	Labour hold	Details
Leeds	Labour	Labour hold	Details
Liverpool	No overall control	No overall control hold	Details
Oldham	Labour	Labour hold	Details
Rochdale	Labour	No overall control gain	Details
Rotherham	Labour	Labour hold	Details
Sandwell	Labour	Labour hold	Details
Sefton	Conservative	Conservative hold	Details
Sheffield	Labour	Labour hold	Details
Solihull	Conservative	Conservative hold	Details
St Helens	Labour	Labour hold	Details
Stockport	Conservative	Conservative hold	Details
Tameside	Labour	Labour hold	Details
Trafford	Conservative	Conservative hold	Details
Walsall	Labour	No overall control gain	Details
Wigan	Labour	Labour hold	Details
Wirral	Conservative	Conservative hold	Details

=== District councils ===
In 103 districts one third of the council was up for election.

Council	Previous control	Result	Details
Adur	Alliance	Alliance hold	Details
Amber Valley	Labour	Labour hold	Details
Barrow-in-Furness	Labour	Labour hold	Details
Basildon	No overall control	Labour gain	Details
Basingstoke and Deane	Conservative	No overall control gain	Details
Bassetlaw	Labour	Labour hold	Details
Bath	Conservative	Conservative hold	Details
Blackburn	No overall control	No overall control hold	Details
Brentwood	Conservative	Conservative hold	Details
Broadland	Conservative	Conservative hold	Details
Broxbourne	Conservative	Conservative hold	Details
Burnley	Labour	Labour hold	Details
Cambridge	No overall control	No overall control hold	Details
Cannock Chase	Labour	No overall control gain	Details
Cherwell	Conservative	Conservative hold	Details
Chester	Conservative	Conservative hold	Details
Chorley	Conservative	Conservative hold	Details
Colchester	Conservative	Conservative hold	Details
Congleton	Conservative	No overall control gain	Details
Craven	Conservative	Conservative hold	Details
Crawley	Labour	Labour hold	Details
Crewe and Nantwich	No overall control	No overall control hold	Details
Daventry	No overall control	No overall control hold	Details
Derby	Labour	Labour hold	Details
East Devon	Conservative	Conservative hold	Details
Eastbourne	Conservative	Conservative hold	Details
Eastleigh	Conservative	Conservative hold	Details
Ellesmere Port and Neston	Labour	Labour hold	Details
Elmbridge	Conservative	Conservative hold	Details
Epping Forest	Conservative	Conservative hold	Details
Fareham	Conservative	Conservative hold	Details
Gillingham	Conservative	Conservative hold	Details
Gloucester	Conservative	Conservative hold	Details
Gosport	Conservative	Conservative hold	Details
Great Grimsby	Labour	Labour hold	Details
Great Yarmouth	No overall control	No overall control hold	Details
Halton	Labour	Labour hold	Details
Harlow	Labour	Labour hold	Details
Hart	Conservative	Conservative hold	Details
Hartlepool	Labour	Labour hold	Details
Hastings	No overall control	No overall control hold	Details
Havant	Conservative	Conservative hold	Details
Hereford	Alliance	Alliance hold	Details
Hertsmere	Conservative	Conservative hold	Details
Huntingdon	Conservative	Conservative hold	Details
Hyndburn	Labour	Labour hold	Details
Ipswich	Labour	Labour hold	Details
Leominster	Independent	Independent hold	Details
Lincoln	Conservative	Labour gain	Details
Macclesfield	Conservative	Conservative hold	Details
Maidstone	Conservative	Conservative hold	Details
Milton Keynes	Conservative	No overall control gain	Details
Mole Valley	Independent	No overall control gain	Details
Newcastle-under-Lyme	Labour	Labour hold	Details
North Hertfordshire	Conservative	Conservative hold	Details
Norwich	Labour	Labour hold	Details
Nuneaton and Bedworth	Labour	Labour hold	Details
Oadby and Wigston	Conservative	Conservative hold	Details
Oxford	Labour	Labour hold	Details
Pendle	No overall control	No overall control hold	Details
Penwith	Independent	Independent hold	Details
Peterborough	Labour	No overall control gain	Details
Preston	Labour	Labour hold	Details
Purbeck	Independent	Independent hold	Details
Reigate and Banstead	Conservative	Conservative hold	Details
Rochford	Conservative	Conservative hold	Details
Rossendale	Conservative	Conservative hold	Details
Rugby	No overall control	No overall control hold	Details
Runnymede	Conservative	Conservative hold	Details
Rushmoor	No overall control	Conservative gain	Details
Scunthorpe	Labour	Labour hold	Details
Shrewsbury and Atcham	No overall control	No overall control hold	Details
South Bedfordshire	Conservative	Conservative hold	Details
South Cambridgeshire	Independent	Independent hold	Details
South Herefordshire	Independent	Independent hold	Details
South Lakeland	No overall control	No overall control hold	Details
Southampton	Conservative	Conservative hold	Details
Southend-on-Sea	Conservative	Conservative hold	Details
St Albans	Conservative	Conservative hold	Details
Stevenage	Labour	Labour hold	Details
Stoke-on-Trent	Labour	Labour hold	Details
Stratford-on-Avon	Conservative	Conservative hold	Details
Swale	Conservative	Conservative hold	Details
Tamworth	Labour	Labour hold	Details
Tandridge	Conservative	Conservative hold	Details
Thamesdown	Labour	Labour hold	Details
Three Rivers	Conservative	Conservative hold	Details
Thurrock	No overall control	Labour gain	Details
Tonbridge and Malling	Conservative	Conservative hold	Details
Tunbridge Wells	Conservative	Conservative hold	Details
Watford	Labour	Labour hold	Details
Welwyn Hatfield	Labour	Labour hold	Details
West Lancashire	Conservative	Conservative hold	Details
West Lindsey	No overall control	No overall control hold	Details
West Oxfordshire	No overall control	No overall control hold	Details
Weymouth and Portland	No overall control	No overall control hold	Details
Winchester	Conservative	Conservative hold	Details
Woking	Conservative	Conservative hold	Details
Wokingham	Conservative	Conservative hold	Details
Woodspring	Conservative	Conservative hold	Details
Worcester	Labour	Labour hold	Details
Wyre Forest	No overall control	No overall control hold	Details
York	No overall control	No overall control hold	Details

== Scotland ==
=== Regional councils ===
Council	Previous control	Result	Details
Borders	Independent	Independent hold	Details
Central	Labour	Labour hold	Details
Dumfries and Galloway	Independent	Independent hold	Details
Fife	Labour	Labour hold	Details
Grampian	Conservative	Conservative hold	Details
Highland	Independent	Independent hold	Details
Lothian	Labour	No overall control gain	Details
Orkney	Independent	Independent hold	Details
Shetland	Independent	Independent hold	Details
Strathclyde	Labour	Labour hold	Details
Tayside	Conservative	Conservative hold	Details
Western Isles	Independent	Independent hold	Details
