= 1986 Harlow District Council election =

English local election

← 1984	8 May 1986	1987 →

14 of the 42 seats to Harlow District Council 22 seats needed for a majority
	First party	Second party	Third party
Party	Labour	Alliance	Conservative
Last election	33	5	4
Seats before	34	5	3
Seats won	13	1	0
Seats after	36	4	2
Seat change	▲2	▼1	▼1
Popular vote	12,987	4,819	3,224
Percentage	61.8%	22.9%	15.3%
- Map showing the results of contested wards in the 1986 Harlow District Council elections.
Council control before election
Labour
Council control after election
Labour

The 1986 Harlow District Council election took place on 8 May 1986 to elect members of Harlow District Council in Essex, England. This was on the same day as other local elections. The Labour Party retained control of the council.

== Election result ==
1986 Harlow local election result
Party	Seats	Gains	Losses	Net gain/loss	Seats %	Votes %	Votes	+/−
Labour	13	2	0	▲2	92.9	61.8	12,987	▲11.5
Alliance	1	0	1	▼1	7.1	22.9	4,819	▼14.1
Conservative	0	0	1	▼1	0.0	15.3	3,224	▲2.8

All comparisons in vote share are to the corresponding 1982 election.

== Ward results ==
=== Brays Grove ===
Location of Brays Grove ward

Brays Grove
Party	Candidate	Votes	%
Labour	D. Howard	838	72.8%
Conservative	T. Owen	166	14.4%
Alliance	S. Rigden	147	12.8%
Turnout			34.3%
Labour hold			

=== Hare Street and Town Centre ===
Location of Hare Street and Town Centre ward

Hare Street and Town Centre
Party	Candidate	Votes	%
Labour	P. Larkin	818	68.5%
Alliance	N. Lincoln	223	18.7%
Conservative	N. Dean	154	12.9%
Turnout			39.9%
Labour hold			

=== Katherines With Sumner ===
Location of Katherines with Sumner ward

Katherines With Sumner
Party	Candidate	Votes	%
Labour	H. Bryant	871	53.2%
Alliance	K. Clark	508	31.1%
Conservative	L. Atkins	257	15.7%
Turnout			37.5%
Labour gain from Alliance			

=== Kingsmoor ===
Location of Kingsmoor ward

Kingsmoor
Party	Candidate	Votes	%
Labour	P. Lynch	923	49.8%
Conservative	R. Cross	665	35.9%
Alliance	L. Swanton	265	14.3%
Turnout			38.7%
Labour gain from Conservative			

=== Latton Bush ===
Location of Latton Bush ward

Latton Bush
Party	Candidate	Votes	%
Labour	Bill Rammell	1,080	64.9%
Alliance	R. Langham	352	21.2%
Conservative	M. Tombs	231	13.9%
Turnout			39.4%
Labour hold			

=== Little Parndon ===
Location of Little Parndon ward

Little Parndon
Party	Candidate	Votes	%
Labour	M. Carter	1,083	66.2%
Alliance	R. Winkie	311	19.0%
Conservative	E. Atkins	242	14.8%
Turnout			39.2%
Labour hold			

=== Mark Hall North ===
Location of Mark Hall North ward

Mark Hall North
Party	Candidate	Votes	%
Labour	E. Morris	678	61.7%
Conservative	C. Starr	230	20.9%
Alliance	M. Seddon	190	17.3%
Turnout			47.7%
Labour hold			

=== Mark Hall South ===
Location of Mark Hall South ward

Mark Hall South
Party	Candidate	Votes	%
Labour	S. Anderson	1,092	69.4%
Conservative	K. Smart	247	15.7%
Alliance	S. Ward	235	14.9%
Turnout			38.8%
Labour hold			

=== Netteswell West ===
Location of Netteswell West ward

Netteswell West
Party	Candidate	Votes	%
Labour	R. Nash	635	71.3%
Alliance	M. Rigden	138	15.5%
Conservative	E. Scammell	117	13.1%
Turnout			36.2%
Labour hold			

=== Old Harlow ===
Location of Old Harlow ward

Old Harlow
Party	Candidate	Votes	%
Labour	S. Firth	1,359	60.0%
Conservative	F. Lawman	610	26.9%
Alliance	H. Dutton	295	13.0%
Turnout			49.9%
Labour hold			

=== Passmores ===
Location of Passmores ward

Passmores
Party	Candidate	Votes	%
Labour	M. Collyer	920	66.5%
Alliance	D. Harris	249	18.0%
Conservative	D. Groves	215	15.5%
Turnout			33.1%
Labour hold			

=== Potter Street ===
Location of Potter Street ward

Potter Street
Party	Candidate	Votes	%
Labour	J. Cave	848	59.3%
Alliance	A. Lee	461	32.3%
Conservative	C. Dean	120	8.4%
Turnout			44.1%
Labour hold			

=== Stewards ===
Location of Stewards ward

Stewards
Party	Candidate	Votes	%
Alliance	D. Collins	941	53.7%
Labour	D. Dickson	703	40.1%
Conservative	T. McArdle	108	6.2%
Turnout			43.8%
Alliance hold			

=== Tye Green ===
Location of Tye Green ward

Tye Green
Party	Candidate	Votes	%
Labour	W. Hanley	1,139	75.7%
Alliance	S. James	191	12.7%
Conservative	S. McArdle	175	11.6%
Turnout			39.0%
Labour hold			
