= 1991 Harlow District Council election =

English local election

← 1990	2 May 1991	1992 →

15 of the 42 seats to Harlow District Council 22 seats needed for a majority
	First party	Second party	Third party
Party	Labour	Conservative	Liberal Democrats
Last election	35	4	3
Seats won	10	4	1
Seats after	33	6	3
Seat change	▼2	▲2	Steady
Popular vote	11,976	8,231	3,711
Percentage	50.1%	34.4%	15.5%
- Map showing the results of contested wards in the 1991 Harlow District Council elections.
Council control before election
Labour
Council control after election
Labour

The 1991 Harlow District Council election took place on 2 May 1991 to elect members of Harlow District Council in Essex, England. This was on the same day as other local elections. The Labour Party retained control of the council, which it had held continuously since the council's creation in 1973.

== Election result ==
1991 Harlow local election result
Party	Seats	Gains	Losses	Net gain/loss	Seats %	Votes %	Votes	+/−
Labour	10	0	2	▼2	66.7	50.1	11,976	▲0.5
Conservative	4	2	0	▲2	26.7	34.4	8,231	▲7.9
Liberal Democrats	1	0	0	Steady	6.7	15.5	3,711	▼8.1

All comparisons in vote share are to the corresponding 1987 election.

== Ward results ==
=== Brays Grove ===
Location of Brays Grove ward

Brays Grove
Party	Candidate	Votes	%
Labour	H. Talbot	870	63.3%
Conservative	D. Fleming	290	21.1%
Liberal Democrats	F. Fiveash	215	15.6%
Turnout			44.1%
Labour hold			

=== Great Parndon ===
Location of Great Parndon ward

Great Parndon
Party	Candidate	Votes	%
Conservative	P. McClarnon	990	57.5%
Labour	L. McCue	732	42.5%
Turnout			53.4%
Conservative hold			

=== Katherines With Sumner ===
Location of Katherines with Sumner ward

Katherines With Sumner
Party	Candidate	Votes	%
Conservative	N. Carter	926	45.2%
Labour	D. Pennick	842	41.1%
Liberal Democrats	S. Ward	280	13.7%
Turnout			44.0%
Conservative gain from Labour			

=== Kingsmoor ===
Location of Kingsmoor ward

Kingsmoor
Party	Candidate	Votes	%
Conservative	R. Cross	1,207	50.4%
Labour	I. Beckett	882	36.9%
Liberal Democrats	K. Addison	304	12.7%
Turnout			50.1%
Conservative hold			

=== Latton Bush ===
Location of Latton Bush ward

Latton Bush
Party	Candidate	Votes	%
Labour	C. Fleming	915	51.7%
Conservative	D. Messer	548	31.0%
Liberal Democrats	T. McArdle	306	17.3%
Turnout			44.4%
Labour hold			

=== Little Parndon ===
Location of Little Parndon ward

Little Parndon
Party	Candidate	Votes	%
Labour	Hugh Kerr	1,023	58.1%
Conservative	S. Butt	413	23.4%
Liberal Democrats	D. Collins	326	18.5%
Turnout			43.9%
Labour hold			

=== Mark Hall North ===
Location of Mark Hall North ward

Mark Hall North
Party	Candidate	Votes	%
Labour	J. McAlpine	574	52.0%
Conservative	D. Roberts	341	30.9%
Liberal Democrats	D. Wright	189	17.1%
Turnout			51.2%
Labour hold			

=== Mark Hall South ===
Location of Mark Hall South ward

Mark Hall South
Party	Candidate	Votes	%
Labour	T. Kent	1,110	70.9%
Conservative	I. Fleming	455	29.1%
Turnout			41.2%
Labour hold			

=== Netteswell East ===
Location of Netteswell East ward

Netteswell East
Party	Candidate	Votes	%
Labour	A. Garner	869	69.1%
Conservative	P. Weales	388	30.9%
Turnout			44.7%
Labour hold			

=== Old Harlow ===
Location of Old Harlow ward

Old Harlow
Party	Candidate	Votes	%
Conservative	V. Roberts	1,210	45.3%
Labour	C. Cave	1,164	43.6%
Liberal Democrats	J. Lever	296	11.1%
Turnout			57.9%
Conservative gain from Labour			

=== Passmores ===
Location of Passmores ward

Passmores
Party	Candidate	Votes	%
Labour	M. Juliff	806	48.9%
Conservative	G. Mitchinson	567	34.4%
Liberal Democrats	N. Armitage	275	16.7%
Turnout			43.1%
Labour hold			

=== Potter Street ===
Location of Potter Street ward

Potter Street
Party	Candidate	Votes	%
Labour	W. Gibson	791	
Labour	S. Warner	606	
Liberal Democrats	R. Lever	359	
Liberal Democrats	C. Hayman	334	
Conservative	F. Feekery	263	
Conservative	J. Carter	239	
Turnout			48.2%
Labour hold			
Labour hold			

=== Stewards ===
Location of Stewards ward

Stewards
Party	Candidate	Votes	%
Liberal Democrats	L. Spenceley	932	57.5%
Labour	C. Downing	456	28.1%
Conservative	M. Baker	232	14.3%
Turnout			45.1%
Liberal Democrats hold			

=== Tye Green ===
Location of Tye Green ward

Tye Green
Party	Candidate	Votes	%
Labour	J. McColl	942	59.9%
Conservative	S. Livings	401	25.5%
Liberal Democrats	N. Spenceley	229	14.6%
Turnout			43.9%
Labour hold			
