= 1984 Harlow District Council election =

English local election

← 1983	3 May 1984	1986 →

14 of the 42 seats to Harlow District Council 22 seats needed for a majority
	First party	Second party	Third party
Party	Labour	Alliance	Conservative
Last election	34	4	3
Seats won	12	1	1
Seats after	33	5	4
Seat change	▼1	▲1	▲1
Popular vote	11,808	4,532	4,503
Percentage	56.7%	21.7%	21.6%
- Map showing the results of contested wards in the 1984 Harlow District Council elections.
Council control before election
Labour
Council control after election
Labour

The 1984 Harlow District Council election took place on 3 May 1984 to elect members of Harlow District Council in Essex, England. This was on the same day as other local elections. The Labour Party retained control of the council.

== Election result ==
1984 Harlow local election result
Party	Seats	Gains	Losses	Net gain/loss	Seats %	Votes %	Votes	+/−
Labour	12	1	2	▼1	85.7	56.7	11,808	▼5.6
Alliance	1	1	0	▲1	7.1	21.7	4,532	▲8.9
Conservative	1	1	1	Steady	7.1	21.6	4,503	▼3.1

All comparisons in vote share are to the corresponding 1980 election.

== Ward results ==
=== Brays Grove ===
Location of Brays Grove ward

Brays Grove
Party	Candidate	Votes	%
Labour	D. Burnham	858	71.4%
Conservative	H. Willcox	343	28.6%
Turnout			35.3%
Labour hold			

=== Great Parndon ===
Location of Great Parndon ward

Great Parndon
Party	Candidate	Votes	%
Conservative	P. McClarnon	842	45.5%
Labour	J. Cave	807	43.6%
Alliance	B. Manktelow	201	10.9%
Turnout			53.3%
Conservative gain from Labour			

=== Hare Street and Town Centre ===
Location of Hare Street and Town Centre ward

Hare Street and Town Centre
Party	Candidate	Votes	%
Labour	J. Hobbs	828	66.6%
Conservative	K. Eaton	245	19.7%
Alliance	A. Merryweather	171	13.7%
Turnout			40.9%
Labour hold			

=== Kingsmoor ===
Location of Kingsmoor ward

Kingsmoor
Party	Candidate	Votes	%
Labour	J. Young	925	48.6%
Conservative	M. Tombs	768	40.4%
Alliance	E. Scammell	209	11.0%
Turnout			39.7%
Labour hold			

=== Latton Bush ===
Location of Latton Bush ward

Latton Bush
Party	Candidate	Votes	%
Labour	A. Jones	1,075	65.2%
Conservative	K. Smart	391	23.7%
Alliance	S. James	182	11.0%
Turnout			38.0%
Labour hold			

=== Little Parndon ===
Location of Little Parndon ward

Little Parndon
Party	Candidate	Votes	%
Labour	D. Condon		
Labour hold			

=== Mark Hall South ===
Location of Mark Hall South ward

Mark Hall South
Party	Candidate	Votes	%
Labour	T. Farr	1,078	60.0%
Alliance	C. Brown	445	24.8%
Conservative	S. Tucker	274	15.2%
Turnout			43.8%
Labour hold			

=== Netteswell East ===
Location of Netteswell East ward

Netteswell East
Party	Candidate	Votes	%
Labour	P. Balbi	755	62.1%
Conservative	R. Dixon	241	19.8%
Alliance	J. Taylor	220	18.1%
Turnout			40.8%
Labour hold			

=== Netteswell West ===
Location of Netteswell West ward

Netteswell West
Party	Candidate	Votes	%
Labour	G. Nethercott	602	66.3%
Conservative	S. Rigden	159	17.5%
Alliance	R. Fautley	147	16.2%
Turnout			36.8%
Labour hold			

=== Old Harlow ===
Location of Old Harlow ward

Old Harlow
Party	Candidate	Votes	%
Labour	Richard Howitt	1,309	55.0%
Conservative	R. Cross	1,069	45.0%
Turnout			51.4%
Labour gain from Conservative			

=== Passmores ===
Location of Passmores ward

Passmores
Party	Candidate	Votes	%
Labour	J. Rogers	949	53.7%
Alliance	A. Thomson	455	25.7%
Conservative	C. Starr	364	20.6%
Turnout			41.8%
Labour hold			

=== Potter Street ===
Location of Potter Street ward

Potter Street
Party	Candidate	Votes	%
Labour	B. Phelps	876	53.3%
Alliance	A. Lee	769	46.7%
Turnout			50.1%
Labour hold			

=== Stewards ===
Location of Stewards ward

Stewards
Party	Candidate	Votes	%
Alliance	P. Reid	1,075	57.7%
Labour	H. Talbot	639	34.3%
Conservative	J. Cross	150	8.0%
Turnout			46.5%
Alliance gain from Labour			

=== Tye Green ===
Location of Tye Green ward

Tye Green
Party	Candidate	Votes	%
Labour	T. Evans	1,107	77.8%
Conservative	A. Brown	315	22.2%
Turnout			35.9%
Labour hold			
