= 1980 Derby City Council election =

1980 UK local government election

← 1979	1 May 1980	1982 →

14 of the 44 seats in the Derby City Council 23 seats needed for a majority
	First party	Second party
Party	Labour	Conservative
Last election	26	18
Seats won	8	6
Seats after	26	18
Seat change	Steady	Steady
Popular vote	20,611	16,935
Percentage	51.7%	42.5%
- Map showing the results of the 1980 Derby City Council elections.
Council control before election
Labour
Council control after election
Labour

The 1980 Derby City Council election took place on 1 May 1980 to elect members of Derby City Council in England. This was on the same day as other local elections. 14 of the council's 44 seats were up for election. The Labour Party retained control of the council.

== Overall results ==
1980 Derby City Council Election
Party	Seats	Gains	Losses	Net gain/loss	Seats %	Votes %	Votes	+/−
Labour	8	0	0	Steady	57.1	51.7	20,611	
Conservative	6	0	0	Steady	42.9	42.5	16,935	
Liberal	0	0	0	Steady	0.0	5.5	2,194	
Ecology	0	0	0	Steady	0.0	0.1	57	
United English National	0	0	0	Steady	0.0	0.1	40	
Total	14						39,837	

== Ward results ==
=== Abbey ===
Location of Abbey ward

Abbey
Party	Candidate	Votes	%
Labour	D. McNab	1,574	64.9%
Conservative	K. Hutchinson	852	35.1%
Turnout			25.1%
Labour hold			

=== Allestree ===
Location of Allestree ward

Allestree
Party	Candidate	Votes	%
Conservative	B. Chadwick	2,134	66.8%
Labour	S. Davies	575	18.0%
Liberal	W. Webley	484	15.2%
Turnout			39.3%
Conservative hold			

=== Alvaston ===
Location of Alvaston ward

Alvaston
Party	Candidate	Votes	%
Labour	G. Sweeting	1,312	64.0%
Conservative	J. Lissett	739	36.0%
Turnout			30.8%
Labour hold			

=== Babington ===
Location of Babington ward

Babington
Party	Candidate	Votes	%
Labour	S. Unwin	1,856	71.9%
Conservative	J. Keith	725	28.1%
Turnout			27.4%
Labour hold			

=== Blagreaves ===
Location of Blagreaves ward

Blagreaves
Party	Candidate	Votes	%
Conservative	F. Murphy	1,481	50.2%
Labour	P. McLaverty	1,470	49.8%
Turnout			37.3%
Conservative hold			

=== Boulton ===
Location of Boulton ward

Boulton
Party	Candidate	Votes	%
Labour	I. Slater	2,029	63.7%
Conservative	D. Hazelwood	1,157	36.3%
Turnout			39.4%
Labour hold			

=== Breadsall ===
Location of Breadsall ward

Breadsall
Party	Candidate	Votes	%
Labour	M. Wawman	1,865	69.5%
Conservative	T. Hoogerwerf	777	29.0%
United English National	S. Gibson	40	1.5%
Turnout			28.2%
Labour hold			

=== Chaddesden ===
Location of Chaddesden ward

Chaddesden
Party	Candidate	Votes	%
Labour	G. Summers	1,826	57.9%
Conservative	G. Andrews	1,329	42.1%
Turnout			35.7%
Labour hold			

=== Chellaston ===
Location of Chellaston ward

Chellaston
Party	Candidate	Votes	%
Conservative	J. Blount	1,513	51.3%
Labour	M. Fuller	1,437	48.7%
Turnout			40.4%
Conservative hold			

=== Darley ===
Location of Darley ward

Darley
Party	Candidate	Votes	%
Conservative	R. Longdon	2,072	57.7%
Labour	D. Parnham	1,168	32.5%
Liberal	M. Kennelly	353	9.8%
Turnout			37.7%
Conservative hold			

=== Derwent ===
Location of Derwent ward

Derwent
Party	Candidate	Votes	%
Labour	L. Topham	1,495	61.3%
Conservative	B. Daniels	482	19.8%
Liberal	S. Connolly	463	19.0%
Turnout			30.7%
Labour hold			

=== Kingsway ===
Location of Kingsway ward

Kingsway
Party	Candidate	Votes	%
Conservative	J. Bates	1,523	52.1%
Labour	E. Jones	811	27.8%
Liberal	A. Smith	588	20.1%
Turnout			37.1%
Conservative hold			

=== Litchurch ===
Location of Litchurch ward

Litchurch
Party	Candidate	Votes	%
Labour	M. Wood	1,557	81.2%
Conservative	A. Northover	361	18.8%
Turnout			21.8%
Labour hold			

=== Spondon ===
Location of Spondon ward

Spondon
Party	Candidate	Votes	%
Conservative	D. Edgar	1,790	47.2%
Labour	J. Osborn	1,636	43.2%
Liberal	T. Dickenson	306	8.1%
Ecology	B. Sabine	57	1.5%
Turnout			39.2%
Conservative hold			
