= 1982 St Albans City and District Council election =

1982 UK local government election

The 1982 St Albans City and District Council election took place on 6 May 1982 to elect members of St Albans City and District Council in England. This was on the same day as other local elections.

== Summary ==
1982 St Albans City and District Council election
Party	This election			Full council			This election		
Party	Seats	Net	Seats %	Other	Total	Total %	Votes	Votes %	+/−
Conservative	8	▼8	40.0	21	29	50.9	19,880	44.2	–5.4
Alliance	10	▲10	50.0	5	15	26.3	17,888	39.7	+20.6
Labour	2	▼1	10.0	8	10	17.5	7,079	15.7	–11.2
Independent	0	▼1	0.0	2	2	3.5	172	0.4	–4.0
Ind. Conservative	0	Steady	0.0	1	1	1.8	N/A	N/A	N/A

== Ward results ==
=== Ashley ===
Ashley
Party	Candidate	Votes	%	±%
Alliance	C. McCarthy	1,318	54.6	+5.6
Conservative	S. Davies	756	31.3	–1.1
Labour	C. Leet	338	14.0	–4.6
Majority		562	23.3	+6.8
Turnout		2,412	51.3	+3.8
Registered electors		4,713		
Alliance gain from Conservative		Swing	▲3.4	

=== Batchwood ===
Batchwood
Party	Candidate	Votes	%	±%
Alliance	N. Stangroom	804	35.4	+14.7
Labour	M. Fletcher*	781	34.4	–12.2
Conservative	M. Dance	684	30.1	–2.6
Majority		23	1.0	N/A
Turnout		2,269	47.8	+8.3
Registered electors		4,755		
Alliance gain from Labour		Swing	▲13.5	

=== Clarence ===
Clarence
Party	Candidate	Votes	%	±%
Alliance	P. Burton	1,066	42.8	+21.8
Conservative	K. Hill	1,030	41.3	–12.7
Labour	N. Harris	395	15.9	–9.2
Majority		36	1.4	N/A
Turnout		2,491	56.1	+9.3
Registered electors		4,451		
Alliance gain from Independent		Swing	▲17.3	

=== Colney Heath ===
Colney Heath
Party	Candidate	Votes	%
Alliance	B. Howard	718	47.9
Alliance	P. Hughes	649	43.3
Conservative	D. Jeffrey	630	42.1
Conservative	L. Ten Holter	554	37.0
Labour	E. Adams	165	11.0
Labour	B. York	156	10.4
Turnout		1,498	51.1
Registered electors		2,931	
Alliance gain from Conservative			
Alliance gain from Conservative			

=== Cunningham ===
Cunningham
Party	Candidate	Votes	%	±%
Alliance	C. Gunner	1,099	47.0	+9.7
Conservative	E. Banbury	858	36.7	+4.1
Labour	M. D Lieto	379	16.2	–13.8
Majority		241	10.3	+5.6
Turnout		2,336	50.3	+3.0
Registered electors		4,662		
Alliance gain from Conservative		Swing	▲2.8	

=== Harpenden East ===
Harpenden East
Party	Candidate	Votes	%	±%
Conservative	B. Bartman	1,244	52.4	+0.4
Alliance	G. Dignum	874	36.8	+13.0
Labour	T. Morris	254	10.7	–13.4
Majority		370	15.6	N/A
Turnout		2,372	46.1	+2.3
Registered electors		5,170		
Conservative hold		Swing	▼6.3	

=== Harpenden North ===
Harpenden North
Party	Candidate	Votes	%	±%
Conservative	K. Haywood*	1,531	57.6	–1.4
Alliance	G. Tattersfield	837	31.5	+13.3
Labour	D. Crew	288	10.8	–12.0
Majority		847	28.4	–7.8
Turnout		2,525	46.3	+6.9
Registered electors		5,068		
Conservative hold		Swing	▼7.4	

=== Harpenden South ===
Harpenden South
Party	Candidate	Votes	%	±%
Conservative	K. McCaw	1,349	57.6	+0.1
Alliance	L. Barker	684	29.2	+13.7
Independent	L. Freitag	172	7.3	–10.4
Labour	C. Fryd	138	5.9	–3.5
Majority		665	28.4	N/A
Turnout		2,343	46.3	–1.7
Registered electors		5,068		
Conservative hold		Swing	▼6.8	

=== Harpenden West ===
Harpenden West
Party	Candidate	Votes	%	±%
Conservative	M. Garvin	1,519	66.2	–3.7
Alliance	R. Nagelschmidt	603	26.3	+5.7
Labour	H. Holmes	173	7.5	–2.0
Majority		916	39.9	–9.4
Turnout		2,295	45.4	+4.5
Registered electors		5,156		
Conservative hold		Swing	▼4.7	

=== London Colney ===
London Colney
Party	Candidate	Votes	%	±%
Labour	F. Perham*	1,115	51.3	–8.7
Conservative	E. Ward	650	29.9	–10.1
Alliance	J. Butcher	410	18.9	N/A
Majority		465	21.4	+1.4
Turnout		2,175	39.4	
Registered electors		5,530		
Labour hold		Swing	▲0.7	

=== Marshallwick North ===
Marshallwick North
Party	Candidate	Votes	%	±%
Alliance	G. Churchard	1,005	40.8	+15.9
Conservative	R. Wakerley	945	38.4	–13.2
Independent	W. Towler*	289	11.7	N/A
Labour	A. Ramsden	224	9.1	–14.4
Majority		60	2.4	N/A
Turnout		2,463	51.8	+11.0
Registered electors		4,755		
Alliance gain from Conservative		Swing	▲14.6	

=== Marshallwick South ===
Marshallwick South
Party	Candidate	Votes	%	±%
Conservative	A. Hill	1,346	50.4	–2.3
Alliance	R. Baker	1,054	39.5	+8.2
Labour	D. Fruin	269	10.1	–5.9
Majority		292	10.9	–10.5
Turnout		2,669	52.2	+8.0
Registered electors		5,127		
Conservative hold		Swing	▼5.3	

=== Park Street ===
Park Street
Party	Candidate	Votes	%	±%
Alliance	J. Spencer	826	48.4	+8.5
Conservative	B. McArdie	701	41.1	+2.9
Labour	R. Fricker	180	10.5	–11.4
Majority		125	7.3	N/A
Turnout		1,707	40.0	+1.0
Registered electors		4,247		
Alliance gain from Conservative		Swing	▲2.8	

=== Redbourn ===
Redbourn
Party	Candidate	Votes	%	±%
Conservative	D. Robinson	1,046	50.8	+6.8
Alliance	J. Bailey	762	37.0	N/A
Labour	C. Hucklesby	250	12.1	N/A
Majority		284	13.8	N/A
Turnout		2,058	46.5	+11.6
Registered electors		4,439		
Conservative hold		Swing	N/A	

=== Sopwell ===
Sopwell
Party	Candidate	Votes	%	±%
Labour	K. Pollard	815	39.6	–18.8
Alliance	N. Lamb	670	32.6	+20.6
Conservative	M. Brownlie	571	27.8	–1.9
Majority		145	7.1	–21.6
Turnout		2,056	44.3	+4.8
Registered electors		4,653		
Labour hold		Swing	▼19.7	

=== St. Peters ===
St. Peters
Party	Candidate	Votes	%	±%
Alliance	P. Thompson	1,104	50.3	+33.3
Conservative	C. Ellis*	647	29.5	+3.2
Labour	R. Protz	442	20.2	–15.4
Majority		457	20.8	N/A
Turnout		1,751	51.1	+10.6
Registered electors		4,311		
Alliance gain from Conservative		Swing	▲15.1	

No Independent candidate as previous (21.0%).

=== St. Stephens ===
St. Stephens
Party	Candidate	Votes	%	±%
Conservative	E. Harrison*	1,386	48.9	–8.7
Alliance	D. Parry	1,092	38.6	+20.2
Labour	R. Humphrey	354	12.5	–11.5
Majority		294	10.4	–23.3
Turnout		2,832	50.5	+9.3
Registered electors		5,617		
Conservative hold		Swing	▼14.5	

=== Verulam ===
Verulam
Party	Candidate	Votes	%	±%
Alliance	M. Frearson	1,390	47.5	N/A
Conservative	R. Scranage*	1,361	46.5	–25.9
Labour	L. Harland	175	6.0	–21.6
Majority		29	1.0	N/A
Turnout		2,926	57.7	+16.1
Registered electors		5,073		
Alliance gain from Conservative		Swing	N/A	

=== Wheathampstead ===
Wheathampstead
Party	Candidate	Votes	%	±%
Conservative	V. Ross	1,070	49.0	–5.2
Alliance	N. Clements	923	42.3	+21.5
Labour	J. Brown	189	8.7	–6.7
Majority		147	6.7	–26.7
Turnout		2,182	46.9	–0.7
Registered electors		4,669		
Conservative hold		Swing	▼13.4	
