= 1992 Harlow District Council election =

English local election

| ← 1991 | 7 May 1992 | 1994 → |

14 of the 42 seats to Harlow District Council 22 seats needed for a majority
| | First party | Second party | Third party |
|---|---|---|---|
| Party | Labour | Conservative | Liberal Democrats |
| Last election | 33 | 6 | 3 |
| Seats before | 32 | 7 | 3 |
| Seats won | 11 | 2 | 1 |
| Seats after | 32 | 7 | 3 |
| Seat change | Steady | Steady | Steady |
| Popular vote | 10,471 | 8,236 | 2,650 |
| Percentage | 49.0% | 38.6% | 12.4% |
- Map showing the results of contested wards in the 1992 Harlow District Council elections.
Council control before election
Labour
Council control after election
Labour

The 1992 Harlow District Council election took place on 7 May 1992 to elect members of Harlow District Council in Essex, England. This was on the same day as other local elections. The Labour Party retained control of the council, which it had held continuously since the council's creation in 1973.

== Election result ==
1992 Harlow local election result
| Party | Seats | Gains | Losses | Net gain/loss | Seats % | Votes % | Votes | +/− |
|---|---|---|---|---|---|---|---|---|
| Labour | 11 | 0 | 0 | Steady | 78.6 | 49.0 | 10,471 | ▼11.1 |
| Conservative | 2 | 0 | 0 | Steady | 14.3 | 38.6 | 8,236 | ▲8.9 |
| Liberal Democrats | 1 | 0 | 0 | Steady | 7.1 | 12.4 | 2,650 | ▲2.5 |

All comparisons in vote share are to the corresponding 1988 election.

== Ward results ==
=== Brays Grove ===
Location of Brays Grove ward

Brays Grove
| Party | Candidate | Votes | % |
|---|---|---|---|
| Labour | D. Burnham | 719 | 60.6% |
| Conservative | D. Fleming | 383 | 32.3% |
| Liberal Democrats | A. Lee | 85 | 7.2% |
| Turnout | | | 38.2% |
| Labour hold | | | |

=== Great Parndon ===
Location of Great Parndon ward

Great Parndon
| Party | Candidate | Votes | % |
|---|---|---|---|
| Conservative | L. Atkins | 884 | 56.1% |
| Labour | L. McCue | 585 | 37.1% |
| Liberal Democrats | P. Mullally | 108 | 6.8% |
| Turnout | | | 48.1% |
| Conservative hold | | | |

=== Hare Street and Town Centre ===
Location of Hare Street and Town Centre ward

Hare Street and Town Centre
| Party | Candidate | Votes | % |
|---|---|---|---|
| Labour | T. Abel | 612 | 48.7% |
| Conservative | A. Shannon | 440 | 35.0% |
| Liberal Democrats | S. Ward | 204 | 16.2% |
| Turnout | | | 45.0% |
| Labour hold | | | |

=== Kingsmoor ===
Location of Kingsmoor ward

Kingsmoor
| Party | Candidate | Votes | % |
|---|---|---|---|
| Conservative | D. Roberts | 1,092 | 56.1% |
| Labour | F. Brown | 675 | 34.7% |
| Liberal Democrats | K. Addison | 179 | 9.2% |
| Turnout | | | 39.7% |
| Conservative hold | | | |

=== Latton Bush ===
Location of Latton Bush ward

Latton Bush
| Party | Candidate | Votes | % |
|---|---|---|---|
| Labour | A. Jones | 834 | 46.8% |
| Conservative | V. Thomas | 801 | 44.9% |
| Liberal Democrats | R. Langham | 148 | 8.3% |
| Turnout | | | 44.1% |
| Labour hold | | | |

=== Little Parndon ===
Location of Little Parndon ward

Little Parndon
| Party | Candidate | Votes | % |
|---|---|---|---|
| Labour | D. Pennick | 911 | 58.9% |
| Conservative | D. Weales | 502 | 32.4% |
| Liberal Democrats | D. Collins | 134 | 8.7% |
| Turnout | | | 37.4% |
| Labour hold | | | |

=== Mark Hall South ===
Location of Mark Hall South ward

Mark Hall South
| Party | Candidate | Votes | % |
|---|---|---|---|
| Labour | M. Danvers | 839 | 59.0% |
| Conservative | R. Keningale | 434 | 30.5% |
| Liberal Democrats | C. Bagnall | 150 | 10.5% |
| Turnout | | | 37.5% |
| Labour hold | | | |

=== Netteswell East ===
Location of Netteswell East ward

Netteswell East
| Party | Candidate | Votes | % |
|---|---|---|---|
| Labour | C. Cave | 709 | 62.1% |
| Conservative | R. Johnston | 344 | 30.1% |
| Liberal Democrats | S. Herbert | 88 | 7.7% |
| Turnout | | | 40.9% |
| Labour hold | | | |

=== Netteswell West ===
Location of Netteswell West ward

Netteswell West
| Party | Candidate | Votes | % |
|---|---|---|---|
| Labour | V. Clark | 522 | 54.3% |
| Conservative | P. Weales | 347 | 36.1% |
| Liberal Democrats | S. Westbrook | 92 | 9.6% |
| Turnout | | | 38.0% |
| Labour hold | | | |

=== Old Harlow ===
Location of Old Harlow ward

Old Harlow
| Party | Candidate | Votes | % |
|---|---|---|---|
| Labour | Richard Howitt | 1,457 | 49.1% |
| Conservative | M. Garnett | 1,362 | 45.9% |
| Liberal Democrats | V. Scott | 146 | 4.9% |
| Turnout | | | 62.9% |
| Labour hold | | | |

=== Passmores ===
Location of Passmores ward

Passmores
| Party | Candidate | Votes | % |
|---|---|---|---|
| Labour | J. Rogers | 722 | 45.6% |
| Conservative | D. Clark | 689 | 43.5% |
| Liberal Democrats | M. Jackson | 174 | 11.0% |
| Turnout | | | 41.5% |
| Labour hold | | | |

=== Potter Street ===
Location of Potter Street ward

Potter Street
| Party | Candidate | Votes | % |
|---|---|---|---|
| Labour | S. Warner | 677 | 55.2% |
| Conservative | S. Butt | 283 | 23.1% |
| Liberal Democrats | T. McArdle | 266 | 21.7% |
| Turnout | | | 40.1% |
| Labour hold | | | |

=== Stewards ===
Location of Stewards ward

Stewards
| Party | Candidate | Votes | % |
|---|---|---|---|
| Liberal Democrats | S. Walker | 772 | 54.6% |
| Labour | C. Downing | 392 | 27.7% |
| Conservative | M. Goddard | 250 | 17.7% |
| Turnout | | | 38.4% |
| Liberal Democrats hold | | | |

=== Tye Green ===
Location of Tye Green ward

Tye Green
| Party | Candidate | Votes | % |
|---|---|---|---|
| Labour | V. Phelps | 817 | 60.7% |
| Conservative | M. Tombs | 425 | 31.6% |
| Liberal Democrats | C. Hayman | 104 | 7.7% |
| Turnout | | | 37.1% |
| Labour hold | | | |
