= 1982 Rochford District Council election =

1982 English local election

- 6 May 1982

15 out of 40 seats to Rochford District Council 21 seats needed for a majority

	First party	Second party	Third party
Party	Conservative	Alliance	Labour
Seats won	11	2	1
Seats after	27	4	3
Seat change	▲1	▲1	Steady
Popular vote	8,939	5,357	3,005
Percentage	48.0%	28.7%	16.1%
Swing	▼5.3%	▲14.2%	▼7.7%
	Fourth party	Fifth party
Party	Residents	Independent
Seats won	1	0
Seats after	3	3
Seat change	▼2	Steady
Popular vote	949	386
Percentage	5.1%	2.1%
Swing	0.0%	▼1.3%
Council control before election
Conservative
Council control after election
Conservative

The 1982 Rochford District Council election took place on 6 May 1982 to elect members of Rochford District Council in Essex, England. This was on the same day as other local elections.

== Summary ==
=== Election result ===
1982 Rochford District Council election
Party	This election			Full council			This election		
Party	Seats	Net	Seats %	Other	Total	Total %	Votes	Votes %	+/−
Conservative	11	▲1	73.3	16	27	67.5	8,939	48.0	–5.3
Alliance	2	▲1	13.3	2	4	10.0	5,357	28.7	+14.2
Labour	1	Steady	6.7	2	3	7.5	3,005	16.1	–7.7
Residents	1	▼2	6.7	2	3	7.5	949	5.1	±0.0
Independent	0	Steady	0.0	3	3	7.5	386	2.1	–1.3

== Ward results ==
Incumbent councillors standing for re-election are marked with an asterisk (*).

=== Downhall ===
Downhall
Party	Candidate	Votes	%	±%
Conservative	K. Cope*	636	62.4	–5.4
Alliance	D. Ward	288	28.3	+13.8
Labour	J. Tucker	95	9.3	–8.3
Majority		348	34.2	–16.0
Turnout		1,019	39.7	+0.7
Registered electors		2,567		
Conservative hold		Swing	▼9.6	

=== Grange & Rawreth ===
Grange & Rawreth
Party	Candidate	Votes	%	±%
Conservative	M. Jones	618	37.9	–5.4
Alliance	M. Rapley	510	31.3	+16.5
Labour	S. Andre	503	30.8	–11.1
Majority		108	6.6	+5.2
Turnout		1,631	39.8	+4.0
Registered electors		4,094		
Conservative hold		Swing	▼11.0	

=== Hawkwell East ===
Hawkwell East (2 seats due to by-election)
Party	Candidate	Votes	%	±%
Conservative	J. Sheaf*	972	54.1	+0.9
Conservative	T. Burt	943	52.5	–0.7
Alliance	C. Brown	450	25.1	N/A
Alliance	J. Benson	380	21.2	N/A
Labour	D. Weir	373	20.8	–26.0
Labour	M. Weir	319	17.8	–29.0
Turnout		~1,796	41.1	+10.6
Registered electors		4,371		
Conservative hold				
Conservative hold				

=== Hockley East ===
Hockley East
Party	Candidate	Votes	%	±%
Conservative	P. Himfen	690	50.3	N/A
Residents	S. Barnard*	682	49.7	N/A
Majority		8	0.6	N/A
Turnout		1,372	42.6	N/A
Registered electors		3,219		
Conservative gain from Residents				

=== Hullbridge Riverside ===
Hullbridge Riverside
Party	Candidate	Votes	%	±%
Alliance	J. Nokes*	386	36.3	N/A
Conservative	J. Parkinson	380	35.7	–4.5
Labour	D. Richardson	297	27.9	–31.9
Majority		6	0.6	N/A
Turnout		1,063	38.3	+2.7
Registered electors		2,777		
Alliance gain from Residents				

=== Hullbridge South ===
Hullbridge South
Party	Candidate	Votes	%	±%
Residents	L. Campbell-Daley*	267	28.6	N/A
Conservative	C. Williams	266	28.5	N/A
Alliance	P. Brading	236	25.3	N/A
Labour	A. Malcolm	164	17.6	N/A
Majority		1	0.1	N/A
Turnout		933	42.9	N/A
Registered electors		2,176		
Residents hold				

=== Lodge ===
Lodge
Party	Candidate	Votes	%	±%
Conservative	J. Murison*	1,073	59.7	–1.5
Alliance	M. Menning	522	29.0	–9.8
Labour	C. Barnaby	203	11.3	N/A
Majority		551	30.6	+8.2
Turnout		1,798	39.4	+7.6
Registered electors		4,561		
Conservative hold		Swing	▲4.2	

=== Rayleigh Central ===
Rayleigh Central
Party	Candidate	Votes	%	±%
Conservative	R. Foster*	529	41.7	–5.9
Independent	S. Silva	386	30.4	–3.6
Alliance	F. Rapley	252	19.8	N/A
Labour	V. Foley	103	8.1	–10.3
Majority		143	11.3	–2.4
Turnout		1,270	44.3	+1.8
Registered electors		2,869		
Conservative hold		Swing	▼1.2	

=== Rochford Eastwood ===
Rochford Eastwood
Party	Candidate	Votes	%	±%
Conservative	W. Budge*	349	54.4	–10.0
Alliance	K. Saunders	292	45.6	N/A
Majority		57	8.9	–20.3
Turnout		641	47.0	–1.0
Registered electors		1,365		
Conservative hold				

=== Rochford Roche ===
Rochford Roche
Party	Candidate	Votes	%	±%
Labour	C. Stephenson*	415	51.2	–3.2
Conservative	W. Heard	284	35.0	–10.6
Alliance	M. Stevens	112	13.8	N/A
Majority		131	16.2	+7.5
Turnout		811	55.0	–0.3
Registered electors		1,474		
Labour hold		Swing	▲3.7	

=== Rochford St Andrews ===
Rochford St Andrews
Party	Candidate	Votes	%	±%
Conservative	M. Warner	448	41.9	–5.8
Labour	D. McKinnell	377	35.2	–17.1
Alliance	M. Clark	245	22.9	N/A
Majority		71	6.6	N/A
Turnout		1,070	40.4	+3.2
Registered electors		2,646		
Conservative hold		Swing	▲5.7	

=== Trinity ===
Trinity
Party	Candidate	Votes	%	±%
Alliance	R. Boyd*	931	63.3	+7.1
Conservative	S. Gibson	487	33.1	–3.0
Labour	E. Lushey	53	3.6	–4.2
Majority		444	30.2	+10.1
Turnout		1,471	53.0	–32.1
Registered electors		2,778		
Alliance hold		Swing	▲5.1	

=== Wheatley ===
Wheatley
Party	Candidate	Votes	%	±%
Conservative	B. Lovett*	700	64.3	+3.5
Alliance	T. Dean	388	35.7	+9.2
Majority		312	28.7	–5.7
Turnout		1,088	45.2	–35.2
Registered electors		2,405		
Conservative hold		Swing	▼2.9	

=== Whitehouse ===
Whitehouse
Party	Candidate	Votes	%	±%
Conservative	B. Taylor*	564	54.7	–15.9
Alliance	D. Turrell	365	35.4	N/A
Labour	J. Foley	103	10.0	–19.4
Majority		199	19.3	–22.0
Turnout		1,032	40.0	–40.0
Registered electors		2,583		
Conservative hold				
