= 1983 Harlow District Council election =

English local election

← 1982	5 May 1983	1984 →

14 of the 42 seats to Harlow District Council 22 seats needed for a majority
	First party	Second party	Third party
Party	Labour	Alliance	Conservative
Last election	33	3	6
Seats before	33	3	5
Seats won	10	2	2
Seats after	34	4	3
Seat change	▲1	▲1	▼2
Popular vote	11,880	7,383	5,824
Percentage	47.4%	29.4%	23.2%
- Map showing the results of contested wards in the 1983 Harlow District Council elections.
Council control before election
Labour
Council control after election
Labour

The 1983 Harlow District Council election took place on 5 May 1983 to elect members of Harlow District Council in Essex, England. This was on the same day as other local elections. The Labour Party retained control of the council.

== Election result ==
1983 Harlow local election result
Party	Seats	Gains	Losses	Net gain/loss	Seats %	Votes %	Votes	+/−
Labour	10	1	0	▲1	71.4	47.4	11,880	▲2.6
Alliance	2	1	0	▲1	14.3	29.4	7,383	▲10.0
Conservative	2	0	2	▼2	14.3	23.2	5,824	▼12.7

All comparisons in vote share are to the corresponding 1979 election.

== Ward results ==
=== Brays Grove ===
Location of Brays Grove ward

Brays Grove
Party	Candidate	Votes	%
Labour	M. Juliff	829	55.2%
Alliance	H. Wilcox	443	29.5%
Conservative	T. McArdle	230	15.3%
Turnout			45.1%
Labour hold			

=== Great Parndon ===
Location of Great Parndon ward

Great Parndon
Party	Candidate	Votes	%
Conservative	G. Mitchinson	888	47.8%
Labour	R. Didham	668	36.0%
Alliance	B. Manktelow	301	16.2%
Turnout			53.5%
Conservative hold			

=== Katherines With Sumner ===
Location of Katherines with Sumner ward

Katherines With Sumner
Party	Candidate	Votes	%
Alliance	P. Martin	859	43.2%
Labour	A. Evans	745	37.5%
Conservative	P. McLaron	383	19.3%
Turnout			46.4%
Alliance gain from Conservative			

=== Kingsmoor ===
Location of Kingsmoor ward

Kingsmoor
Party	Candidate	Votes	%
Conservative	F. Burgoyne	900	41.1%
Labour	J. Young	836	38.2%
Alliance	N. Huggins	454	20.7%
Turnout			47.0%
Conservative hold			

=== Latton Bush ===
Location of Latton Bush ward

Latton Bush
Party	Candidate	Votes	%
Labour	P. Bruce	1,056	56.8%
Conservative	N. Clapham	463	24.9%
Alliance	S. James	341	18.3%
Turnout			43.8%
Labour hold			

=== Little Parndon ===
Location of Little Parndon ward

Little Parndon
Party	Candidate	Votes	%
Labour	S. Warner	990	59.2%
Alliance	P. McLintic	343	20.5%
Conservative	E. Atkins	339	20.3%
Turnout			40.5%
Labour hold			

=== Mark Hall North ===
Location of Mark Hall North ward

Mark Hall North
Party	Candidate	Votes	%
Labour	J. McAlpine	629	48.0%
Conservative	P. Mould	342	26.1%
Alliance	N. Armitage	339	25.9%
Turnout			55.2%
Labour hold			

=== Mark Hall South ===
Location of Mark Hall South ward

Mark Hall South
Party	Candidate	Votes	%
Labour	L. Smith	994	54.6%
Alliance	C. Brown	515	28.3%
Conservative	S. Tucker	312	17.1%
Turnout			44.5%
Labour hold			

=== Netteswell East ===
Location of Netteswell East ward

Netteswell East
Party	Candidate	Votes	%
Labour	A. Garner	732	52.0%
Alliance	R. Freeman	379	26.9%
Conservative	R. Dixon	296	21.0%
Turnout			47.0%
Labour hold			

=== Old Harlow ===
Location of Old Harlow ward

Old Harlow
Party	Candidate	Votes	%
Labour	C. Cochrane	1,054	40.0%
Alliance	P. Ramsay	801	30.4%
Conservative	R. Cross	779	29.6%
Turnout			58.3%
Labour gain from Conservative			

=== Passmores ===
Location of Passmores ward

Passmores
Party	Candidate	Votes	%
Labour	R. Rowland	806	44.8%
Alliance	D. Filler	746	41.5%
Conservative	M. Tombs	246	13.7%
Turnout			44.0%
Labour hold			

=== Potter Street ===
Location of Potter Street ward

Passmores
Party	Candidate	Votes	%
Labour	W. Gibson	907	56.5%
Alliance	A. Lee	529	33.0%
Conservative	N. Dean	168	10.5%
Turnout			49.4%
Labour hold			

=== Stewards ===
Location of Stewards ward

Stewards
Party	Candidate	Votes	%
Alliance	J. Hewitt	1,056	59.0%
Labour	R. Nash	544	30.4%
Conservative	J. Cross	190	10.6%
Turnout			45.7%
Alliance hold			

=== Tye Green ===
Location of Tye Green ward

Tye Green
Party	Candidate	Votes	%
Labour	M. Danvers		%
Conservative	R. Nash	544	30.4%
Alliance	J. Cross	190	10.6%
Turnout			45.7%
Labour hold			
