= 1982 Hertsmere Borough Council election =

Local election in England

- 6 May 1982

13 out of 39 seats to Hertsmere Borough Council 20 seats needed for a majority
- Registered: 45,653
- Turnout: 50.0% (▲8.0%)

	First party	Second party	Third party
Party	Conservative	Labour	Alliance
Seats won	8	2	3
Seats after	21	12	6
Seat change	▼1	Steady	▲1
Popular vote	11,889	2,849	8,056
Percentage	52.1%	12.5%	35.3%
Swing	▲3.4%	▼12.5%	▲9.0%
- Winner of each seat at the 1982 Hertsmere Borough Council election. Wards in white were not contested.
Control before election
Conservative
Control after election
Conservative

The 1982 Hertsmere Borough Council election took place on 6 May 1982 to elect members of Hertsmere Borough Council in Hertfordshire, England. This was on the same day as other local elections.

== Summary ==
=== Election result ===
1982 Hertsmere Borough Council election
Party	This election				Full council			This election		
Party	Candidates	Seats	Net	Seats %	Other	Total	Total %	Votes	Votes %	+/−
Conservative	{{{candidates}}}	8	▼1	61.5	13	21	53.8	11,889	52.1	+3.4
Labour	{{{candidates}}}	2	Steady	15.4	10	12	30.8	2,849	12.5	–12.5
Alliance	{{{candidates}}}	3	▲1	23.1	3	6	15.4	8,056	35.3	+9.0
Independent	{{{candidates}}}	0	Steady	0.0	0	0	0.0	14	0.1	N/A

== Ward results ==
Incumbent councillors standing for re-election are marked with an asterisk (*). Changes in seats do not take into account by-elections or defections.

=== Aldenham East ===
Aldenham East
Party	Candidate	Votes	%	±%
Conservative	D. Nelson*	1,421	79.2	+1.2
Alliance	C. Mallach	269	15.0	+1.2
Labour	M. Simanowitz	105	5.8	–2.4
Majority		1,152	64.2	±0.0
Turnout		1,795	51.7	–27.0
Registered electors		3,472		
Conservative hold		Swing	0.0	

=== Brookmeadow ===
Brookmeadow
Party	Candidate	Votes	%	±%
Labour	P. Roach*	1,084	68.9	–4.0
Alliance	G. Colover	240	15.3	N/A
Conservative	T. Warren	235	14.9	–12.2
Independent	P. John	14	0.9	N/A
Majority		844	53.7	+7.9
Turnout		1,573	51.0	–24.4
Registered electors		3,084		
Labour hold				

=== Elstree ===
Elstree
Party	Candidate	Votes	%	±%
Conservative	C. Watts*	1,249	64.1	–1.0
Alliance	J. Holman	464	23.8	+10.0
Labour	J. Whitby	235	12.1	–9.0
Majority		785	40.3	–3.7
Turnout		1,948	48.8	–30.8
Registered electors		3,992		
Conservative hold		Swing	▼5.5	

=== Heath North ===
Heath North
Party	Candidate	Votes	%	±%
Conservative	J. Harding*	1,034	55.0	+5.4
Alliance	L. Hodgson	846	45.0	+3.7
Majority		188	10.0	+1.7
Turnout		1,880	52.7	+7.9
Registered electors		3,567		
Conservative hold		Swing	▲0.9	

=== Heath South ===
Heath South
Party	Candidate	Votes	%	±%
Conservative	I. Harding	1,061	68.8	–0.1
Alliance	M. Colne	482	31.2	+11.6
Majority		579	37.5	–11.8
Turnout		1,543	42.2	+6.3
Registered electors		3,656		
Conservative hold		Swing	▼5.9	

=== Kenilworth ===
Kenilworth
Party	Candidate	Votes	%	±%
Labour	A. Jones	666	44.5	–5.7
Conservative	A. Gattward	427	28.5	–9.0
Alliance	M. Kirsh	404	27.0	+14.7
Majority		239	16.0	+3.3
Turnout		1,497	46.2	–29.1
Registered electors		3,240		
Labour hold		Swing	▲1.7	

=== Mill ===
Mill
Party	Candidate	Votes	%	±%
Alliance	D. Curtis	1,111	67.9	–2.9
Conservative	A. Attwood	525	32.1	+13.5
Majority		586	35.8	–16.4
Turnout		1,636	47.9	–32.9
Registered electors		3,415		
Alliance hold		Swing	▼8.2	

=== Potters Bar Central ===
Potters Bar Central
Party	Candidate	Votes	%	±%
Conservative	I. Fielding*	803	47.5	+7.7
Alliance	D. Martin	740	43.8	–7.9
Labour	D. Banks	146	8.6	+0.1
Majority		63	3.7	N/A
Turnout		1,689	54.2	+0.8
Registered electors		3,116		
Conservative hold		Swing	▲7.8	

=== Potters Bar East ===
Potters Bar East
Party	Candidate	Votes	%	±%
Conservative	A. Brice*	1,295	56.6	–4.2
Alliance	D. Keith	654	28.6	+12.3
Labour	G. Coats	338	14.8	–8.2
Majority		641	28.0	–9.8
Turnout		2,287	47.2	+10.8
Registered electors		4,845		
Conservative hold		Swing	▼8.3	

=== Potters Bar North ===
Potters Bar North
Party	Candidate	Votes	%	±%
Conservative	W. Stock*	1,192	67.9	–8.2
Alliance	C. Cook	476	27.1	+12.0
Labour	M. Grace	88	5.0	–3.8
Majority		716	40.8	–20.2
Turnout		1,756	47.8	+7.4
Registered electors		3,674		
Conservative hold		Swing	▼10.1	

=== Potters Bar South ===
Potters Bar South
Party	Candidate	Votes	%	±%
Conservative	E. Daniel*	892	59.3	–1.9
Alliance	R. Vessey	425	28.3	+14.2
Labour	B. Burness	187	12.4	–12.3
Majority		467	31.1	–5.4
Turnout		1,504	50.1	+7.8
Registered electors		3,002		
Conservative hold		Swing	▼8.1	

=== St. James East ===
St. James East
Party	Candidate	Votes	%	±%
Alliance	A. King	872	56.3	–1.8
Conservative	G. Silver	677	43.7	+12.3
Majority		195	12.6	–14.1
Turnout		1,549	50.1	–0.9
Registered electors		3,092		
Alliance gain from Conservative		Swing	▼7.1	

=== St. James West ===
St. James West
Party	Candidate	Votes	%	±%
Conservative	L. Silver*	1,078	50.1	–11.9
Alliance	L. Brass	1,073	49.9	+21.8
Majority		5	0.2	–7.3
Turnout		2,151	61.5	+9.5
Registered electors		3,498		
Conservative hold		Swing	▼16.9	
