= 1982 Welwyn Hatfield District Council election =

Welwyn Hatfield District Council election

- 6 May 1982

14 out of 43 seats to Welwyn Hatfield District Council 22 seats needed for a majority
- Turnout: 37,611, 50.4%

	First party	Second party	Third party
Party	Labour	Conservative	Alliance
Last election	25 seats, 52.5%	18 seats, 44.2%	0 seats, 2.8%
Seats before	25	18	0
Seats after	25	18	0
Seat change	Steady	Steady	Steady
Popular vote	14,053	15,810	7,726
Percentage	37.4%	42.0%	20.5%
Swing	▼15.1%	▼2.2%	▲17.7%

The 1982 Welwyn Hatfield District Council election took place on 6 May 1982 to elect members of Welwyn Hatfield District Council in England. This was on the same day as other local elections. A third of the council's seats were up for election. The newly formed SDP–Liberal Alliance saw a huge improvement in their share of their vote compared to their predecessor, scoring over 20% of the vote; the highest percentage for a third party since the forming of the Welwyn Hatfield's council. They were ultimately unsuccessful in gaining any seats; there were no net change in seats for any party, a first for the district.

== Summary ==
=== Election result ===
1982 Welwyn Hatfield District Council election
Party	This election			Full council			This election		
Party	Seats	Net	Seats %	Other	Total	Total %	Votes	Votes %	+/−
Labour	8	Steady	57.1	17	25	58.1	14,053	37.4	–15.1
Conservative	6	Steady	42.9	12	18	41.9	15,810	42.0	–2.2
Alliance	0	Steady	0.0	0	0	0.0	7,726	20.5	+17.7
Independent	0	Steady	0.0	0	0	0.0	22	0.1	–0.4
