= 1982 Derby City Council election =

1982 UK local government election

← 1980	6 May 1982	1983 →

15 of the 44 seats in the Derby City Council 23 seats needed for a majority
	First party	Second party
Party	Labour	Conservative
Last election	26	18
Seats before	27	17
Seats won	9	6
Seats after	27	17
Seat change	Steady	Steady
Popular vote	17,229	19,254
Percentage	34.8%	38.9%
- Map showing the results of the 1982 Derby City Council elections.
Council control before election
Labour
Council control after election
Labour

The 1982 Derby City Council election took place on 6 May 1982 to elect members of Derby City Council in England. This was on the same day as other local elections. 15 of the council's 44 seats were up for election. The Labour Party retained control of the council.

== Overall results ==
1982 Derby City Council Election
Party	Seats	Gains	Losses	Net gain/loss	Seats %	Votes %	Votes	+/−
Labour	9	0	0	Steady	60.0	34.8	17,229	
Conservative	6	0	0	Steady	40.0	38.9	19,254	
Alliance	0	0	0	Steady	0.0	25.4	12,585	
Independent	0	0	0	Steady	0.0	0.7	368	
United English National	0	0	0	Steady	0.0	0.1	50	
Total	15						49,486	

== Ward results ==
=== Abbey ===
Location of Abbey ward

Abbey
Party	Candidate	Votes	%
Labour	M. Walker	1,461	47.0%
Conservative	M. Rowley	921	29.6%
Alliance	D. Cocker	726	23.4%
Turnout			33.3%
Labour hold			

=== Allestree ===
Location of Allestree ward

Allestree
Party	Candidate	Votes	%
Conservative	J. Thorpe	2,687	63.4%
Alliance	W. Webley	1,177	27.8%
Labour	K. Clarke	374	8.8%
Turnout			51.7%
Conservative hold			

=== Alvaston ===
Location of Alvaston ward

Alvaston
Party	Candidate	Votes	%
Labour	J. Osborn	933	37.5%
Conservative	J. Lissett	784	31.5%
Alliance	I. Graham	771	31.0%
Turnout			35.2%
Labour hold			

=== Babington ===
Location of Babington ward

Babington
Party	Candidate	Votes	%
Labour	W. Matthews	1,710	56.4%
Conservative	R. Brown	516	17.0%
Alliance	R. Cliff	436	14.4%
Independent	K. Johal	368	12.1%
Turnout			32.8%
Labour hold			

=== Blagreaves ===
Location of Blagreaves ward

Blagreaves
Party	Candidate	Votes	%
Conservative	J. Keith	1,756	44.1%
Labour	R. Turner	1,172	29.5%
Alliance	D. George	1,051	26.4%
Turnout			49.5%
Conservative hold			

=== Boulton ===
Location of Boulton ward

Boulton
Party	Candidate	Votes	%
Labour	A. Kennedy	1,413	39.0%
Conservative	H. Sephton	1,141	31.5%
Alliance	C. Moore	1,073	29.6%
Turnout			40.1%
Labour hold			

=== Breadsall ===
Location of Breadsall ward

Breadsall
Party	Candidate	Votes	%
Labour	E. Ward	1,526	41.4%
Alliance	F. Bell	1,062	28.8%
Conservative	B. Oxley	1,051	28.5%
United English National	S. Gibson	50	1.4%
Turnout			37.0%
Labour hold			

=== Darley ===
Location of Darley ward

Darley
Party	Candidate	Votes	%
Conservative	J. Tillett	2,366	58.5%
Alliance	E. Woods	994	24.6%
Labour	R. Eddy	687	17.0%
Turnout			42.6%
Conservative hold			

=== Littleover ===
Location of Littleover ward

Littleover
Party	Candidate	Votes	%
Conservative	L. Shepley	1,756	56.5%
Alliance	G. Taylor	787	25.3%
Labour	M. Taylor	564	18.2%
Turnout			44.8%
Conservative hold			

=== Mackworth ===
Location of Mackworth ward

Mackworth
Party	Candidate	Votes	%
Labour	R. Baxter	1,465	51.3%
Conservative	J. Gabrielczyk	698	24.4%
Alliance	P. King	695	24.3%
Turnout			37.3%
Labour hold			

=== Mickleover ===
Location of Mickleover ward

Mickleover
Party	Candidate	Votes	%
Conservative	N. Keene	1,901	52.0%
Alliance	B. Stokes	1,211	33.1%
Labour	D. Dorrell	543	14.9%
Turnout			46.4%
Conservative hold			

=== Normanton ===
Location of Normanton ward

Normanton
Party	Candidate	Votes	%
Labour	L. Shillingford	1,475	51.2%
Conservative	J. Matthews	870	30.2%
Alliance	J. Bottomley	536	18.6%
Turnout			36.4%
Labour hold			

=== Osmaston ===
Location of Osmaston ward

Osmaston
Party	Candidate	Votes	%
Labour	R. Laxton	1,096	61.9%
Conservative	R. Debrick	357	20.1%
Alliance	E. Taylor	319	18.0%
Turnout			25.0%
Labour hold			

=== Sinfin ===
Location of Sinfin ward

Sinfin
Party	Candidate	Votes	%
Labour	N. Dhindsa	1,438	51.6%
Conservative	G. Andrews	676	24.2%
Alliance	J. Glazebrook	674	24.2%
Turnout			37.1%
Labour hold			

=== Spondon ===
Location of Spondon ward

Spondon
Party	Candidate	Votes	%
Conservative	G. Du Sautoy	1,774	42.0%
Labour	R. Thrower	1,372	32.5%
Alliance	K. Tivey	1,073	25.4%
Turnout			42.1%
Conservative hold			
