= 1979 Derby City Council election =

1979 UK local government election

← 1976	3 May 1979	1980 →

All 44 seats in the Derby City Council 23 seats needed for a majority
	First party	Second party
Party	Labour	Conservative
Last election	26	28
Seats won	26	18
Seat change	Steady	▼10
Popular vote	53,325	51,164
Percentage	47.1%	45.2%
- Map showing the results of the 1979 Derby City Council elections.
Council control before election
Conservative
Council control after election
Labour

The 1979 Derby City Council election took place on 3 May 1979 to elect members of Derby City Council in England. This was on the same day as other local elections. Voting took place across 18 wards, each electing 3 Councillors. The Labour Party gained control of the council from the Conservative Party.

== Overall results ==
1979 Derby City Council Election
Party	Seats	Gains	Losses	Net gain/loss	Seats %	Votes %	Votes	+/−
Labour	26			Steady	59.1	47.1	53,325	▲6.3
Conservative	18			▼10	40.9	45.2	51,164	▼6.5
Liberal	0			Steady	0.0	6.4	7,276	▲0.1
Independent	0			Steady	0.0	1.0	1,132	New
United English National	0			Steady	0.0	0.2	244	▼1.0
Communist	0			Steady	0.0	0.0	49	New
Total	44						113,190	

== Ward results ==
=== Abbey ===
Location of Abbey ward

Abbey
Party	Candidate	Votes	%
Labour	F. Tunnicliffe	3,101	
Labour	M. Walker	2,735	
Labour	D. McNab	2,714	
Conservative	K. Marples	2,061	
Conservative	K. Hutchinson	2,030	
Conservative	D. Williams	1,937	
Independent	T. Parker	508	
Liberal	E. Richards	382	
Liberal	J. Titterton	362	
Liberal	L. Wilson	331	
Turnout			64.3%
Labour win (new seat)			
Labour win (new seat)			
Labour win (new seat)			

=== Allestree ===
Location of Allestree ward

Allestree
Party	Candidate	Votes	%
Conservative	J. Thorpe	4,302	
Conservative	B. Chadwick	4,273	
Labour	S. Davies	1,419	
Labour	K. Bloor	1,384	
Liberal	W. Nuttall	987	
Turnout			84.0%
Conservative win (new seat)			
Conservative win (new seat)			

=== Alvaston ===
Location of Alvaston ward

Alvaston
Party	Candidate	Votes	%
Labour	W. Baker	2,293	
Labour	G. Sweeting	2,061	
Conservative	B. Stafford	1,971	
Conservative	J. McNair	1,771	
Turnout			70.1%
Labour win (new seat)			
Labour win (new seat)			

=== Babington ===
Location of Babington ward

Babington
Party	Candidate	Votes	%
Labour	J. Maltby	3,332	
Labour	W. Matthews	3,268	
Labour	S. Unwin	2,805	
Conservative	V. Flint	1,895	
Conservative	M. Garland	1,836	
Conservative	T. Hoogerwerf	1,731	
Independent	K. Johal	624	
United English National	S. Gibson	244	
Turnout			63.5%
Labour win (new seat)			
Labour win (new seat)			
Labour win (new seat)			

=== Blagreaves ===
Location of Blagreaves ward

Blagreaves
Party	Candidate	Votes	%
Conservative	M. Grimwood-Taylor	3,430	
Conservative	F. Murphy	3,276	
Labour	I. Slater	2,410	
Labour	P. McLaverty	2,397	
Turnout			74.2%
Conservative win (new seat)			
Conservative win (new seat)			

=== Boulton ===
Location of Boulton ward

Boulton
Party	Candidate	Votes	%
Labour	A. Kennedy	3,321	
Labour	C. Perkins	3,267	
Conservative	W. Hughes	2,615	
Conservative	H. Mrozek	2,424	
Turnout			74.6%
Labour win (new seat)			
Labour win (new seat)			

=== Breadsall ===
Location of Breadsall ward

Breadsall
Party	Candidate	Votes	%
Labour	E. Ward	3,980	
Labour	M. Wawman	3,790	
Conservative	S. Nicols	2,478	
Conservative	E. Wood	2,354	
Turnout			69.9%
Labour win (new seat)			
Labour win (new seat)			

=== Chaddesden ===
Location of Chaddesden ward

Chaddesden
Party	Candidate	Votes	%
Labour	F. Brocklehurst	3,285	
Labour	G. Summers	3,245	
Conservative	G. Andrews	3,075	
Conservative	H. Sephton	2,775	
Turnout			72.1%
Labour win (new seat)			
Labour win (new seat)			

=== Chellaston ===
Location of Chellaston ward

Chellaston
Party	Candidate	Votes	%
Conservative	A. Bussell	2,786	
Conservative	J. Blount	2,646	
Labour	M. Fuller	2,569	
Labour	J. Moseley	2,369	
Turnout			77.1%
Conservative win (new seat)			
Conservative win (new seat)			

=== Darley ===
Location of Darley ward

Darley
Party	Candidate	Votes	%
Conservative	E. Reid	4,376	
Conservative	J. Tillett	4,322	
Conservative	R. Longdon	4,162	
Labour	T. Wilson	2,155	
Labour	J. Dolan	2,152	
Labour	G. Bolton	2,099	
Turnout			69.3%
Conservative win (new seat)			
Conservative win (new seat)			
Conservative win (new seat)			

=== Derwent ===
Location of Derwent ward

Derwent
Party	Candidate	Votes	%
Labour	G. Topham	2,975	
Labour	L. Topham	2,693	
Conservative	B. Daniels	1,510	
Conservative	E. Kitchen	1,436	
Liberal	S. Connolly	735	
Liberal	S. Cudworth	593	
Communist	B. Birks	49	
Turnout			65.6%
Labour win (new seat)			
Labour win (new seat)			

=== Kingsway ===
Location of Kingsway ward

Kingsway
Party	Candidate	Votes	%
Conservative	H. Johnson	2,820	
Conservative	J. Bates	2,712	
Labour	E. Jones	1,495	
Labour	J. Anderson	1,391	
Liberal	B. Benson	1,355	
Liberal	A. Spendlove	1,306	
Turnout			70.9%
Conservative win (new seat)			
Conservative win (new seat)			

=== Litchurch ===
Location of Litchurch ward

Litchurch
Party	Candidate	Votes	%
Labour	R. Newton	3,611	
Labour	M. Wood	3,333	
Conservative	A. Northover	1,377	
Conservative	R. Hyde	1,363	
Turnout			52.4%
Labour win (new seat)			
Labour win (new seat)			

=== Littleover ===
Location of Littleover ward

Littleover
Party	Candidate	Votes	%
Conservative	R. Wood	3,453	
Conservative	L. Shepley	3,431	
Labour	P. Woodhead	1,420	
Labour	R. Umney	1,392	
Turnout			73.1%
Conservative win (new seat)			
Conservative win (new seat)			

=== Mackworth ===
Location of Mackworth ward

Mackworth
Party	Candidate	Votes	%
Labour	D. Robinson	3,221	
Labour	R. Baxter	3,182	
Conservative	R. Doubleday	1,805	
Conservative	B. Broxholme	1,651	
Liberal	L. Taylor	733	
Liberal	K. Toombs	725	
Turnout			73.9%
Labour win (new seat)			
Labour win (new seat)			

=== Mickleover ===
Location of Mickleover ward

Mickleover
Party	Candidate	Votes	%
Conservative	N. Glen	2,062	
Conservative	N. Keene	2,060	
Liberal	A. Smith	1,839	
Liberal	E. Sharp	1,762	
Labour	J. Ward	1,140	
Labour	H. Gorham	1,013	
Turnout			78.5%
Conservative win (new seat)			
Conservative win (new seat)			

=== Normanton ===
Location of Normanton ward

Normanton
Party	Candidate	Votes	%
Labour	J. Godfrey	3,148	
Labour	R. Laxton	2,978	
Conservative	R. Andjelic	2,124	
Conservative	R. Oldershaw	2,048	
Turnout			68.8%
Labour win (new seat)			
Labour win (new seat)			

=== Osmanton ===
Location of Osmaston ward

Osmanton
Party	Candidate	Votes	%
Labour	B. Carty	3,085	
Labour	R. Spacey	2,789	
Conservative	A. Allen	1,336	
Conservative	H. Parsons	1,261	
Turnout			62.0%
Labour win (new seat)			
Labour win (new seat)			

=== Sinfin ===
Location of Sinfin ward

Sinfin
Party	Candidate	Votes	%
Labour	E. Bull	2,554	
Labour	N. Dhindsa	2,150	
Conservative	J. Keith	2,024	
Conservative	W. Swinburn	1,902	
Turnout			66.4%
Labour win (new seat)			
Labour win (new seat)			

=== Spondon ===
Location of Spondon ward

Spondon
Party	Candidate	Votes	%
Conservative	J. Scholes	3,664	
Conservative	D. Kellogg	3,550	
Conservative	D. Edgar	3,498	
Labour	R. Collar	2,811	
Labour	T. Cullerton	2,739	
Labour	W. Pountain	2,370	
Liberal	T. Dickenson	1,245	
Liberal	J. Somerset-Sullivan	735	
Turnout			80.8%
Conservative win (new seat)			
Conservative win (new seat)			
Conservative win (new seat)			
