= 1982 Borders Regional Council election =

Scottish local election

Map showing results by Borders Regional Electoral District.

Elections for Borders Regional Council took place on Thursday 6 May 1982, alongside elections to the various regional councils across Scotland.

Independents won 12 of the council's 23 seats.

== Aggregate results ==
Scottish Borders Regional Council election, 1982
Party	Seats	Gains	Losses	Net gain/loss	Seats %	Votes %	Votes	+/−
Independent	12							
Conservative	8							
Liberal	3							
Borders Independent	0				0.0			
SNP	0				0.0			
Labour	0				0.0			
