= 1987 Harlow District Council election =

English local election

- 7 May 1987

14 of the 42 seats to Harlow District Council 22 seats needed for a majority
	First party	Second party	Third party
Party	Labour	Alliance	Conservative
Last election	36	4	2
Seats won	11	1	2
Seats after	37	3	2
Seat change	▲1	▼1	Steady
Popular vote	12,082	5,755	6,469
Percentage	49.6%	23.6%	26.5%
- Map showing the results of contested wards in the 1987 Harlow District Council elections.
Council control before election
Labour
Council control after election
Labour

The 1987 Harlow District Council election took place on 7 May 1987 to elect members of Harlow District Council in Essex, England. This was on the same day as other local elections held across the United Kingdom. The Labour Party retained control of the council.

== Election result ==
1987 Harlow local election result
Party	Seats	Gains	Losses	Net gain/loss	Seats %	Votes %	Votes	+/−
Labour	11	1	0	▲1	78.6	49.6	12,082	▲1.8
Conservative	2	0	0	Steady	14.3	26.5	6,469	▲2.9
Alliance	1	0	1	▼1	7.1	23.6	5,755	▼5.8
Ind. Conservative	1	0	0	Steady	0.0	0.3	74	New

All comparisons in vote share are to the corresponding 1983 election.

== Ward results ==
=== Brays Grove ===
Location of Brays Grove ward

Brays Grove
Party	Candidate	Votes	%
Labour	H. Talbot	835	59.0%
Conservative	V. Petch	293	20.7%
Alliance	E. Scammell	287	20.3%
Turnout			43.0%
Labour hold			

=== Great Parndon ===
Location of Great Parndon ward

Great Parndon
Party	Candidate	Votes	%
Conservative	P. McClarnon	876	46.4%
Labour	P. Brown	689	36.5%
Alliance	D. Harris	324	17.2%
Turnout			56.6%
Conservative hold			

=== Katherines With Sumner ===
Location of Katherines with Sumner ward

Katherines With Sumner
Party	Candidate	Votes	%
Labour	V. Clark	800	46.2%
Conservative	M. Rigden	498	28.7%
Alliance	P. Barton	435	25.1%
Turnout			39.2%
Labour gain from Alliance			

=== Kingsmoor ===
Location of Kingsmoor ward

Kingsmoor
Party	Candidate	Votes	%
Conservative	R. Cross	852	41.1%
Labour	D. Law	812	39.2%
Alliance	D. Collins	408	19.7%
Turnout			43.5%
Conservative hold			

=== Latton Bush ===
Location of Latton Bush ward

Latton Bush
Party	Candidate	Votes	%
Labour	P. Bruce	1,018	57.0%
Conservative	M. Tombs	446	25.0%
Alliance	R. Langham	321	18.0%
Turnout			42.5%
Labour hold			

=== Little Parndon ===
Location of Little Parndon ward

Little Parndon
Party	Candidate	Votes	%
Labour	S. Warner	913	54.3%
Alliance	E. Atkins	365	21.7%
Conservative	E. Atkins	328	19.5%
Ind. Conservative	T. Hodge	74	4.4%
Turnout			40.0%
Labour hold			

=== Mark Hall North ===
Location of Mark Hall North ward

Mark Hall North
Party	Candidate	Votes	%
Labour	J. McAlpine	686	56.5%
Conservative	S. Rigden	332	27.3%
Alliance	B. Hanks	196	16.1%
Turnout			53.6%
Labour hold			

=== Mark Hall South ===
Location of Mark Hall South ward

Mark Hall South
Party	Candidate	Votes	%
Labour	L. Smith	1,062	60.4%
Alliance	S. Nixon	362	20.6%
Conservative	B. Hill	334	19.0%
Turnout			44.3%
Labour hold			

=== Netteswell East ===
Location of Netteswell East ward

Netteswell East
Party	Candidate	Votes	%
Labour	A. Garner	753	54.6%
Conservative	I. Crame	328	23.8%
Alliance	V. Scott	298	21.6%
Turnout			47.0%
Labour hold			

=== Old Harlow ===
Location of Old Harlow ward

Old Harlow
Party	Candidate	Votes	%
Labour	C. Cochrane	1,110	40.9%
Conservative	N. Hitch	966	35.6%
Alliance	R. Winkie	636	23.5%
Turnout			60.2%
Labour hold			

=== Passmores ===
Location of Passmores ward

Passmores
Party	Candidate	Votes	%
Labour	R. Rowland	860	51.5%
Conservative	L. Atkins	443	26.5%
Alliance	S. Curran	366	21.9%
Turnout			41.1%
Labour hold			

=== Potter Street ===
Location of Potter Street ward

Potter Street
Party	Candidate	Votes	%
Labour	W. Gibson	928	61.0%
Alliance	S. Ward	352	23.1%
Conservative	D. Fleming	241	15.8%
Turnout			47.4%
Labour hold			

=== Stewards ===
Location of Stewards ward

Stewards
Party	Candidate	Votes	%
Alliance	K. Clarke	958	54.3%
Labour	D. Dickson	578	32.8%
Conservative	K. Eaton	227	12.9%
Turnout			44.9%
Alliance hold			

=== Tye Green ===
Location of Tye Green ward

Tye Green
Party	Candidate	Votes	%
Labour	M. Danvers	1,038	58.0%
Conservative	S. James	484	27.0%
Alliance	S. Keeys	268	15.0%
Turnout			47.6%
Labour hold			
