= 1982 Broxbourne Borough Council election =

Local government election

The Broxbourne Council election, 1982 was held to elect council members of the Broxbourne Borough Council, the local government authority of the borough of Broxbourne, Hertfordshire, England.

== Composition of expiring seats before election ==
Ward	Party	Incumbent Elected	Incumbent	Standing again?
Broxbourne	Conservative	1978	Don Smith	Yes
Bury Green	Conservative	1978	Sidney Johnson	Yes
Cheshunt Central	Conservative	1978	George Batchelor	Yes
Cheshunt North	Conservative	1978	Don Poole	Yes
Flamstead End	Conservative	1978	Leonard Goodman	Yes
Goffs Oak	Conservative	1978	Marie Dowsett	Yes
Hoddesdon North	Conservative	1978	Tony Kay	No
Hoddesdon Town	Conservative	1978	Brian Fallace	No
Rosedale	Conservative	1978	Adrian Ebeling	No
Rye Park	Conservative	1978	James Grethe	Yes
Theobalds	Conservative	1978	Herbert Collins	Yes
Waltham Cross North	Conservative	1978	Norman Ames	Yes
Waltham Cross South	Labour	1978	Jean Paice	Yes (Note: Jean Paice stood in Rosedale Ward as an SDP - Liberal Alliance candidate in 1982.)
Wormley & Turnford	Conservative	1978	Brian Hill	Yes

== Election results ==
Broxbourne local election result 1982
Party	Seats	Gains	Losses	Net gain/loss	Seats %	Votes %	Votes	+/−
Conservative	12	0	1	-1	85.72	54.04	12,759	
Alliance	1	1	0	+1	7.14	26.40	6,232	
Labour	1	0	0	0	7.14	18.99	4,483	
Independent	0	0	0	0	0.00	0.58	136	

== Results summary ==
An election was held in 14 wards on 6 May 1982.

The SDP-Liberal Alliance gained 1 seat from the Conservatives in Rosedale Ward.

- Conservative 33 seats
- Labour 7 seats
- SDP-Liberal Alliance 2 seats

== Ward results ==
Broxbourne Ward Result 6 May 1982
Party	Candidate	Votes	%	±%
Conservative	Don Smith	1,407	64.19	
Alliance	Julian Gould	639	29.15	
Labour	Brenda Vincent	146	6.66	
Majority		768		
Turnout		2,192	42.80	
Conservative hold		Swing		

Bury Green Ward Result 6 May 1982
Party	Candidate	Votes	%	±%
Conservative	Sidney Johnson	1,055	44.74	
Labour	Roy Jordan	827	35.07	
Alliance	Janet Bonus	476	20.19	
Majority		228		
Turnout		2,358	44.10	
Conservative hold		Swing		

Cheshunt Central Ward Result 6 May 1982
Party	Candidate	Votes	%	±%
Conservative	George Batchelor	995	66.38	
Alliance	George Norris	296	19.75	
Labour	Cherry Robbins	208	13.87	
Majority		699		
Turnout		1,499	41.90	
Conservative hold		Swing		

Cheshunt North Ward Result 6 May 1982
Party	Candidate	Votes	%	±%
Conservative	Don Poole	935	53.10	
Labour	John Bryant	407	23.11	
Alliance	Derianne Fisher	283	16.07	
Independent	Leslie Hill	136	7.72	
Majority		528		
Turnout		1,761	37.60	
Conservative hold		Swing		

Flamstead End Ward Result 6 May 1982
Party	Candidate	Votes	%	±%
Conservative	Leonard Goodman	1,163	58.68	
Alliance	Kenneth Furse	465	23.46	
Labour	Martin Hudson	354	17.86	
Majority		698		
Turnout		1,982	45.00	
Conservative hold		Swing		

Goffs Oak Ward Result 6 May 1982
Party	Candidate	Votes	%	±%
Conservative	Marie Dowsett	996	73.56	
Alliance	Christopher White	259	19.13	
Labour	Robin Dubow	99	7.31	
Majority		737		
Turnout		1,354	42.80	
Conservative hold		Swing		

Hoddesdon North Ward Result 6 May 1982
Party	Candidate	Votes	%	±%
Conservative	James Grethe	1,295	65.57	
Alliance	Patricia Waughray	492	24.91	
Labour	Walter Sheppard	188	9.52	
Majority		801		
Turnout		1,975	42.00	
Conservative hold		Swing		

Hoddesdon Town Ward Result 6 May 1982
Party	Candidate	Votes	%	±%
Conservative	Raymond Woolfe	883	51.22	
Alliance	Jeffrey Butler	567	32.89	
Labour	Jill Nugent	274	15.89	
Majority		316		
Turnout		1,724	38.50	
Conservative hold		Swing		

Rosedale Ward Result 6 May 1982
Party	Candidate	Votes	%	±%
Alliance	Jean Paice	423	38.95	
Conservative	Christina Rooke	406	37.38	
Labour	Michael Crane	257	23.67	
Majority		17		
Turnout		1,086	54.10	
Alliance gain from Conservative		Swing		

Rye Park Ward Result 6 May 1982
Party	Candidate	Votes	%	±%
Conservative	Alan Roberts	821	39.72	
Alliance	Robert Thurston	627	30.33	
Labour	Paul Garrett	619	29.95	
Majority		194		
Turnout		2,067	46.20	
Conservative hold		Swing		

Theobalds Ward Result 6 May 1982
Party	Candidate	Votes	%	±%
Conservative	Herbert Collins	867	53.13	
Alliance	Anthony Upton	424	25.98	
Labour	Winifred Press	341	20.89	
Majority		443		
Turnout		1,632	40.20	
Conservative hold		Swing		

Waltham Cross North Ward Result 6 May 1982
Party	Candidate	Votes	%	±%
Conservative	Norman Ames	763	52.55	
Alliance	Patricia Morris	383	26.38	
Labour	Graham Knight	306	21.07	
Majority		380		
Turnout		1,452	46.00	
Conservative hold		Swing		

Waltham Cross South Ward Result 6 May 1982
Party	Candidate	Votes	%	±%
Labour	John Shipp	548	43.77	
Conservative	Patrick Kemp	448	35.78	
Alliance	David Storr	256	20.45	
Majority		100		
Turnout		1,252	31.70	
Labour hold		Swing		

Wormley / Turnford Ward Result 6 May 1982
Party	Candidate	Votes	%	±%
Conservative	Brian Hill	725	56.82	
Alliance	Hilda Chart	350	27.43	
Labour	Annette Marples	201	15.75	
Majority		375		
Turnout		1,276	33.70	
Conservative hold		Swing		
