= 1980 Harlow District Council election =

English local election

← 1979	1 May 1980	1982 →

15 of the 42 seats to Harlow District Council 23 seats needed for a majority
	First party	Second party	Third party
Party	Labour	Conservative	Liberal
Last election	32	7	2
Seats won	14	1	0
Seats after	33	7	2
Seat change	▲1	Steady	▼1
Popular vote	12,365	4,891	2,537
Percentage	62.3%	24.7%	12.8%
- Map showing the results of contested wards in the 1980 Harlow District Council elections.
Council control before election
Labour
Council control after election
Labour

The 1980 Harlow District Council election took place on 1 May 1980 to elect members of Harlow District Council in Essex, England. This was on the same day as other local elections. The Labour Party retained control of the council.

== Election result ==
1980 Harlow local election result
Party	Seats	Gains	Losses	Net gain/loss	Seats %	Votes %	Votes	+/−
Labour	14	1	0	▲1	93.3	62.3	12,365	
Conservative	1	0	0	Steady	6.7	24.7	4,891	
Liberal	0	0	1	▼1	0.0	12.8	2,537	
National Front	0	0	0	Steady	0.0	0.2	48	

== Ward results ==
=== Brays Grove ===
Location of Brays Grove ward

Brays Grove
Party	Candidate	Votes	%
Labour	D. Burnham	775	75.0%
Conservative	M. Ashcroft	258	25.0%
Turnout			31.0%
Labour hold			

=== Great Parndon ===
Location of Great Parndon ward

Great Parndon
Party	Candidate	Votes	%
Labour	J. Cave	837	61.4%
Conservative	R. Weyers	412	30.2%
Liberal	T. Owen	114	8.4%
Turnout			41.0%
Labour hold			

=== Hare Street and Town Centre ===
Location of Hare Street and Town Centre ward

Hare Street and Town Centre
Party	Candidate	Votes	%
Labour	J. Hobbs	689	64.6%
Conservative	E. Atkins	243	22.8%
Liberal	A. Merryweather	135	12.7%
Turnout			35.1%
Labour hold			

=== Kingsmoor ===
Location of Kingsmoor ward

Kingsmoor
Party	Candidate	Votes	%
Labour	T. Kent	863	53.9%
Conservative	L. Atkins	617	38.5%
Liberal	L. Swanton	122	7.6%
Turnout			35.2%
Labour hold			

=== Latton Bush ===
Location of Latton Bush ward

Latton Bush
Party	Candidate	Votes	%
Labour	K. Edwards	1,172	68.8%
Conservative	R. Brown	428	25.1%
Liberal	C. Merryweather	104	6.1%
Turnout			40.2%
Labour hold			

=== Little Parndon ===
Location of Little Parndon ward

Little Parndon
Party	Candidate	Votes	%
Labour	D. Condon	1,008	60.2%
Conservative	M. Tombs	338	20.2%
Liberal	P. Ramsay	329	19.6%
Turnout			38.5%
Labour hold			

=== Mark Hall South ===
Location of Mark Hall South ward

Mark Hall South
Party	Candidate	Votes	%
Labour	T. Farr	967	69.0%
Liberal	J. Mercer	435	31.0%
Turnout			59.6%
Labour hold			

=== Netteswell East ===
Location of Netteswell East ward

Netteswell East
Party	Candidate	Votes	%
Labour	A. Graham	741	68.0%
Conservative	P. Harries	268	24.6%
Liberal	D. Eldridge	81	7.4%
Turnout			35.8%
Labour hold			

=== Netteswell West ===
Location of Netteswell West ward

Netteswell West
Party	Candidate	Votes	%
Labour	J. Desormeaux	628	68.2%
Conservative	F. Burgoyne	175	19.0%
Liberal	W. Mitchell	118	12.8%
Turnout			37.3%
Labour hold			

=== Old Harlow ===
Location of Old Harlow ward

Old Harlow
Party	Candidate	Votes	%
Conservative	H. Dutton	1,166	50.3%
Labour	S. Firth	1,151	49.7%
Turnout			51.0%
Conservative hold			

=== Passmores ===
Location of Passmores ward

Passmores
Party	Candidate	Votes	%
Labour	A. Jones	846	60.2%
Conservative	C. Brown	340	24.2%
Liberal	D. Filler	219	15.6%
Turnout			%
Labour hold			

=== Potter Street ===
Location of Potter Street ward

Potter Street
Party	Candidate	Votes	%
Labour	V. Phelps	907	73.2%
Conservative	L. Crust	200	16.1%
Liberal	S. Ward	132	10.7%
Turnout			38.7%
Labour hold			

=== Stewards ===
Location of Stewards ward

Stewards
Party	Candidate	Votes	%
Labour	H. Talbot	794	48.9%
Liberal	J. Hewitt	608	37.4%
Conservative	R. Cross	223	13.7%
Turnout			41.3%
Labour gain from Liberal			

=== Tye Green (2 seats) ===
Location of Tye Green ward

Tye Green (2 seats)
Party	Candidate	Votes	%
Labour	A. James	987	
Labour	J. Ellis	964	
Conservative	E. Gibson	223	
Conservative	S. Tombs	195	
Liberal	L. Fuller	140	
Liberal	M. Ramsey	128	
National Front	C. Saunders	48	
Turnout			35.9%
Labour hold			
Labour hold			
