= 1982 Wolverhampton Metropolitan Borough Council election =

1982 UK local government election

The 1982 Council elections held in Wolverhampton on Thursday 6 May 1982 were one third, and 20 of the 60 seats were up for election.

1982 was the first year the SDP and Liberal Party stood in alliance.

1982 was also the first year of elections following boundary changes that saw the loss of Wednesfield Heath, Eastfield and Parkfield wards and the bringing in of Fallings Park, East Park and Heath Town wards.

Prior to the election the constitution of the Council was:

- Labour 31
- Conservative 28
- Alliance 1

Following the election the constitution of the Council was:

- Labour 33
- Conservative 26
- Alliance 1

== Ward results ==
Bilston East
Party	Candidate	Votes	%	±%
Labour	D Turner	1763		
Conservative	P Windridge	511		
Alliance	C Dawson	575		
Majority		1252		

Bilston North
Party	Candidate	Votes	%	±%
Conservative	C Barber	1334		
Labour	S Gangar	1131		
Alliance	G Carter	1051		
Majority		203		

Blakenhall
Party	Candidate	Votes	%	±%
Labour	J Rowley	1812		
Conservative	R Stickland	1487		
Alliance	P Hurlstone	735		
Majority		325		

Bushbury
Party	Candidate	Votes	%	±%
Conservative	G Patten	1590		
Labour	R Bennett	1021		
Alliance	E George	760		
Majority		569		

East Park
Party	Candidate	Votes	%	±%
Labour	G Howells	1540		
Alliance	K Parkes	754		
Conservative	J Perry	670		
Majority		786		

Ettingshall
Party	Candidate	Votes	%	±%
Labour	E Bold	1665		
Conservative	P Ellis	562		
Alliance	J Bailey	492		
Majority		1103		

Fallings Park
Party	Candidate	Votes	%	±%
Conservative	J Carpenter	1703		
Labour	Mrs P Byrne	1389		
Alliance	D Hislop	868		
Majority		314		

Graiseley
Party	Candidate	Votes	%	±%
Labour	F Ledsam	2008		
Conservative	Mrs K Dass	1434		
Alliance	R Steel	1052		
Independent	Dr S Prasad	99		
Majority		574		

Heath Town
Party	Candidate	Votes	%	±%
Labour	K Purchase	1321		
Conservative	J Margetts	966		
Alliance	C Hallmark	815		
Majority		355		

Low Hill
Party	Candidate	Votes	%	±%
Labour	Peter Bilson	1667		
Conservative	Mrs C Horton	832		
Alliance	H Salt	406		
Majority		835		

Merry Hill
Party	Candidate	Votes	%	±%
Conservative	B Clarke	2581		
Alliance	B Lamb	1498		
Labour	Mrs A Clark	552		
Majority		835		

Oxley
Party	Candidate	Votes	%	±%
Conservative	F Haley	1424		
Labour	Mrs J Jones	854		
Alliance	E Mitchell	730		
Majority		570		

Park
Party	Candidate	Votes	%	±%
Conservative	W Morrison	2671		
Labour	A McPherson	1094		
Alliance	D Craft	954		
Majority		1577		

Penn
Party	Candidate	Votes	%	±%
Conservative	A Bickley	3216		
Alliance	J Nock	1258		
Labour	R Lawrence	470		
Majority		1958		

St Peter's
Party	Candidate	Votes	%	±%
Labour	I Claymore	2546		
Conservative	N Ling	656		
Alliance	R Gray	537		
Majority		1890		

Spring Vale
Party	Candidate	Votes	%	±%
Labour	Mrs M Pointon	1490		
Conservative	B Green	1230		
Alliance	R Whitehouse	935		
National Front	E Shaw	111		
Majority		260		

Tettenhall Regis
Party	Candidate	Votes	%	±%
Conservative	S Morton	2317		
Alliance	L McLean	969		
Labour	B Hill	506		
Majority		1348		

Tettenhall Wightwick
Party	Candidate	Votes	%	±%
Conservative	R Watson	2889		
Alliance	K Worrall	922		
Labour	C Winder	449		
Majority		1967		

Wednesfield North
Party	Candidate	Votes	%	±%
Conservative	G Jones	1607		
Labour	Mrs T Walton	1389		
Alliance	M Pearson	718		
Majority		218		

Wednesfield South
Party	Candidate	Votes	%	±%
Labour	Mrs L Leader	1656		
Conservative	J Davis	1469		
Alliance	J Thompson	602		
Majority		187		
