= 1979 Harlow District Council election =

English local election

← 1978	3 May 1979	1980 →

14 of the 42 seats to Harlow District Council 23 seats needed for a majority
	First party	Second party	Third party
Party	Labour	Conservative	Liberal
Last election	33	4	5
Seats won	9	4	1
Seats after	32	7	3
Seat change	▼1	▲3	▼2
Popular vote	17,671	14,155	7,634
Percentage	44.8%	35.9%	19.3%
- Map showing the results of contested wards in the 1979 Harlow District Council elections.
Council control before election
Labour
Council control after election
Labour

The 1979 Harlow District Council election took place on 3 May 1979 to elect members of Harlow District Council in Essex, England. This was on the same day as other local elections. The Labour Party retained control of the council.

== Election result ==
1979 Harlow local election result
Party	Seats	Gains	Losses	Net gain/loss	Seats %	Votes %	Votes	+/−
Labour	9	1	2	▼1	64.3	44.8	17,671	
Conservative	4	3	0	▲3	28.6	35.9	14,155	
Liberal	1	0	2	▼2	7.1	19.3	7,634	

== Ward results ==
=== Brays Grove ===
Location of Brays Grove ward

Brays Grove
Party	Candidate	Votes	%
Labour	M. Juliff	1,322	51.6%
Conservative	M. Ashcroft	850	33.2%
Liberal	P. Naylor	389	15.2%
Turnout			76.3%
Labour hold			

=== Great Parndon ===
Location of Great Parndon ward

Great Parndon
Party	Candidate	Votes	%
Conservative	E. Hill	1,120	43.1%
Labour	C. Cave	1,052	40.5%
Liberal	T. Owen	425	16.4%
Turnout			79.0%
Conservative gain from Labour			

=== Katherines With Sumner ===
Location of Katherines with Sumner ward

Katherines With Sumner
Party	Candidate	Votes	%
Conservative	D. Workman	994	44.9%
Labour	J. Lockhart	898	40.6%
Liberal	C. Dunham	322	14.5%
Turnout			79.5%
Conservative gain from Liberal			

=== Kingsmoor ===
Location of Kingsmoor ward

Kingsmoor
Party	Candidate	Votes	%
Conservative	L. Atkins	1,378	41.2%
Labour	A. Jones	1,272	38.0%
Liberal	L. Swanton	698	20.8%
Turnout			74.5%
Conservative gain from Labour			

=== Latton Bush ===
Location of Latton Bush ward

Latton Bush
Party	Candidate	Votes	%
Labour	P. Bruce	1,506	46.0%
Conservative	R. Brown	1,288	39.4%
Liberal	I. Richards	478	14.6%
Turnout			78.3%
Labour hold			

=== Little Parndon ===
Location of Little Parndon ward

Little Parndon
Party	Candidate	Votes	%
Labour	S. Warner	1,475	44.4%
Conservative	E. Atkins	963	29.0%
Liberal	P. Ramsay	886	26.7%
Turnout			77.7%
Labour gain from Liberal			

=== Mark Hall North ===
Location of Mark Hall North ward

Mark Hall North
Party	Candidate	Votes	%
Labour	J. McAlpine	901	46.2%
Conservative	P. Moulds	740	38.0%
Liberal	M. Ramsay	308	15.8%
Turnout			81.4%
Labour hold			

=== Mark Hall South ===
Location of Mark Hall South ward

Mark Hall South
Party	Candidate	Votes	%
Labour	L. Smith	1,507	50.1%
Conservative	J. Hawkins	934	31.1%
Liberal	J. Mercer	565	18.8%
Turnout			74.4%
Labour hold			

=== Netteswell East ===
Location of Netteswell East ward

Netteswell East
Party	Candidate	Votes	%
Labour	A. Garner	1,236	52.1%
Conservative	C. Zarzecki	765	32.2%
Liberal	D. Eldridge	373	15.7%
Turnout			78.5%
Labour hold			

=== Old Harlow ===
Location of Old Harlow ward

Old Harlow
Party	Candidate	Votes	%
Conservative	G. Reynolds	1,865	51.0%
Labour	S. Firth	1,393	38.1%
Liberal	J. Kelly	400	10.9%
Turnout			81.3%
Conservative hold			

=== Passmores ===
Location of Passmores ward

Passmores
Party	Candidate	Votes	%
Labour	R. Didham	1,288	44.2%
Conservative	D. Long	1,024	35.2%
Liberal	D. Filler	599	20.6%
Turnout			73.7%
Labour hold			

=== Potter Street ===
Location of Potter Street ward

Potter Street
Party	Candidate	Votes	%
Labour	W. Gibson	1,338	55.5%
Conservative	L. Crust	645	26.8%
Liberal	S. Ward	426	17.7%
Turnout			77.5%
Labour hold			

=== Stewards ===
Location of Stewards ward

Stewards
Party	Candidate	Votes	%
Liberal	J. Hewitt	1,128	39.0%
Labour	C. Cackett	1,021	35.3%
Conservative	L. Atkins	742	25.7%
Turnout			74.9%
Liberal hold			

=== Tye Green ===
Location of Tye Green ward

Tye Green
Party	Candidate	Votes	%
Labour	M. Danvers	1,462	49.6%
Conservative	E. Gibson	847	28.8%
Liberal	J. Wilson	637	21.6%
Turnout			76.0%
Labour hold			
