= 1982 City of Bradford Metropolitan District Council election =

1982 UK local government election

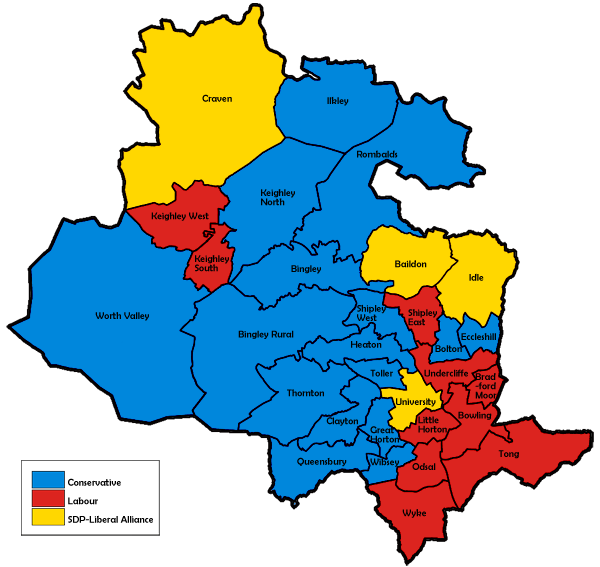
Map of the results for the 1982 Bradford council election.

Elections to City of Bradford Metropolitan District Council were held on Thursday, 6 May 1982, with one third of the council to be elected. The council fell to no overall control after the elections.

== Election result ==
Bradford local election result 1982
| Party | Seats | Gains | Losses | Net gain/loss | Seats % | Votes % | Votes | +/− |
|---|---|---|---|---|---|---|---|---|
| Conservative | 16 | 8 | 2 | +6 | 53.3 | 38.6 | 52,635 | -2.8% |
| Labour | 10 | 0 | 9 | -9 | 33.3 | 32.7 | 44,497 | -13.4% |
| Alliance | 4 | 3 | 0 | +3 | 13.3 | 28.1 | 38,280 | +17.3% |
| Independent Muslim | 0 | 0 | 0 | 0 | 0.0 | 0.4 | 518 | +0.4% |
| Ecology | 0 | 0 | 0 | 0 | 0.0 | 0.1 | 158 | -0.8% |
| Independent | 0 | 0 | 0 | 0 | 0.0 | 0.0 | 51 | -0.3% |
| Communist | 0 | 0 | 0 | 0 | 0.0 | 0.0 | 41 | +0.0% |

This result had the following consequences for the total number of seats on the council after the elections:

| Party | Previous council | New council |
|---|---|---|
| Conservatives | 37 | 43 |
| Labour | 50 | 41 |
| Alliance | 3 | 6 |
| Total | 90 | 90 |
| Working majority | -16 | -4 |

== Ward results ==
Baildon
| Party | Candidate | Votes | % | ±% |
|---|---|---|---|---|
| Alliance (Liberal) | K. Greenwood | 2,456 | 44.2 | −2.7 |
| Conservative | D. Moore | 2,384 | 42.9 | +6.6 |
| Labour | C. Wardman | 720 | 12.9 | −3.9 |
| Majority | | 72 | 1.3 | −9.2 |
| Turnout | | 5,560 | | |
| Alliance gain from Conservative | | Swing | -4.6 | |

Bingley
| Party | Candidate | Votes | % | ±% |
|---|---|---|---|---|
| Conservative | W. Nunn | 2,469 | 51.3 | +7.9 |
| Labour | M. Mould | 1,183 | 24.6 | −10.6 |
| Alliance (SDP) | J. Ryan | 1,162 | 24.1 | +2.6 |
| Majority | | 1,286 | 26.7 | +18.5 |
| Turnout | | 4,814 | | |
| Conservative hold | | Swing | +9.2 | |

Bingley Rural
| Party | Candidate | Votes | % | ±% |
|---|---|---|---|---|
| Conservative | E. Nelson | 2,782 | 60.2 | +4.6 |
| Alliance (Liberal) | M. Greenwood | 1,076 | 23.3 | +4.8 |
| Labour | S. Leman | 760 | 16.5 | −9.3 |
| Majority | | 1,706 | 36.9 | +7.1 |
| Turnout | | 4,618 | | |
| Conservative hold | | Swing | -0.1 | |

Bolton
| Party | Candidate | Votes | % | ±% |
|---|---|---|---|---|
| Conservative | F. Lee | 1,748 | 41.5 | −8.3 |
| Alliance (SDP) | J. Minshull | 1,277 | 30.3 | +30.3 |
| Labour | J. Allinson | 1,189 | 28.2 | −22.0 |
| Majority | | 471 | 11.2 | +10.7 |
| Turnout | | 4,214 | | |
| Conservative gain from Labour | | Swing | -19.3 | |

Bowling
| Party | Candidate | Votes | % | ±% |
|---|---|---|---|---|
| Labour | M. Walters | 2,226 | 58.1 | −16.3 |
| Conservative | P. Ridgway | 825 | 21.5 | −4.0 |
| Alliance (Liberal) | G. Sutcliffe | 780 | 20.4 | +20.4 |
| Majority | | 1,401 | 36.6 | −12.3 |
| Turnout | | 3,831 | | |
| Labour hold | | Swing | -6.1 | |

Bradford Moor
| Party | Candidate | Votes | % | ±% |
|---|---|---|---|---|
| Labour | B. Turner | 2,608 | 52.5 | −16.4 |
| Alliance (SDP) | W. Whitley | 1,176 | 23.7 | +23.7 |
| Conservative | K. Sugden | 1,141 | 23.0 | −8.1 |
| Communist | I. Iveson | 41 | 0.8 | +0.8 |
| Majority | | 1,432 | 28.8 | −9.0 |
| Turnout | | 4,966 | | |
| Labour hold | | Swing | -20.0 | |

Clayton
| Party | Candidate | Votes | % | ±% |
|---|---|---|---|---|
| Conservative | G. Seager | 2,006 | 43.0 | −7.6 |
| Labour | G. Mitchell | 1,549 | 33.2 | −16.3 |
| Alliance (Liberal) | L. Robinson | 1,114 | 23.9 | +23.9 |
| Majority | | 457 | 9.8 | +8.7 |
| Turnout | | 4,669 | | |
| Conservative hold | | Swing | +4.3 | |

Craven
| Party | Candidate | Votes | % | ±% |
|---|---|---|---|---|
| Alliance (Liberal) | R. Binns | 2,275 | 48.2 | +13.6 |
| Conservative | J. Ramsey | 1,888 | 40.0 | −0.7 |
| Labour | C. Smith | 559 | 11.8 | −13.0 |
| Majority | | 387 | 8.2 | +2.1 |
| Turnout | | 4,722 | | |
| Alliance gain from Conservative | | Swing | +7.1 | |

Eccleshill
| Party | Candidate | Votes | % | ±% |
|---|---|---|---|---|
| Conservative | S. Swallow | 1,786 | 40.7 | +2.3 |
| Labour | T. Hare | 1,570 | 35.8 | −15.8 |
| Alliance (SDP) | C. Delaney | 1,029 | 23.5 | +23.5 |
| Majority | | 216 | 4.9 | −8.3 |
| Turnout | | 4,385 | | |
| Conservative gain from Labour | | Swing | +9.0 | |

Great Horton
| Party | Candidate | Votes | % | ±% |
|---|---|---|---|---|
| Conservative | J. Lewis | 1,862 | 38.6 | −5.9 |
| Labour | B. Kearns | 1,801 | 37.4 | −18.0 |
| Alliance (SDP) | E. Williams | 1,154 | 24.0 | +24.0 |
| Majority | | 61 | 1.3 | −9.5 |
| Turnout | | 4,817 | | |
| Conservative gain from Labour | | Swing | +6.0 | |

Heaton
| Party | Candidate | Votes | % | ±% |
|---|---|---|---|---|
| Conservative | C. Hobson | 2,439 | 47.2 | −13.9 |
| Alliance (SDP) | M. Pallard | 1,418 | 27.4 | +27.4 |
| Labour | L. Crawford | 1,315 | 25.4 | −13.5 |
| Majority | | 1,021 | 19.7 | −2.4 |
| Turnout | | 5,172 | | |
| Conservative hold | | Swing | -20.6 | |

Idle
| Party | Candidate | Votes | % | ±% |
|---|---|---|---|---|
| Alliance (Liberal) | A. Bagshaw | 1,821 | 44.9 | +6.9 |
| Conservative | A. Garnett | 1,264 | 31.2 | +3.7 |
| Labour | B. Gilroy | 971 | 23.9 | −10.6 |
| Majority | | 557 | 13.7 | +10.2 |
| Turnout | | 4,056 | | |
| Alliance hold | | Swing | +1.6 | |

Ilkley
| Party | Candidate | Votes | % | ±% |
|---|---|---|---|---|
| Conservative | J. Cussons | 2,878 | 60.9 | +5.5 |
| Alliance (SDP) | B. Woodman | 1,426 | 30.2 | +6.0 |
| Labour | G. Psarias | 423 | 8.9 | +8.9 |
| Majority | | 1,452 | 30.7 | −0.5 |
| Turnout | | 4,727 | | |
| Conservative hold | | Swing | -0.2 | |

Keighley North
| Party | Candidate | Votes | % | ±% |
|---|---|---|---|---|
| Conservative | K. Metcalfe | 1,796 | 34.8 | −9.0 |
| Alliance (Liberal) | P. Harrison | 1,703 | 33.0 | +17.5 |
| Labour | F. Sunderland | 1,656 | 32.1 | −8.5 |
| Majority | | 93 | 1.8 | −1.5 |
| Turnout | | 5,155 | | |
| Conservative gain from Labour | | Swing | -13.2 | |

Keighley South
| Party | Candidate | Votes | % | ±% |
|---|---|---|---|---|
| Labour | A. Rye | 2,342 | 49.6 | −9.2 |
| Alliance (Liberal) | S. Green | 1,641 | 34.8 | +13.9 |
| Conservative | J. Maxfield | 736 | 15.6 | −4.6 |
| Majority | | 701 | 14.8 | −23.1 |
| Turnout | | 4,719 | | |
| Labour hold | | Swing | -11.5 | |

Keighley West
| Party | Candidate | Votes | % | ±% |
|---|---|---|---|---|
| Labour | P. Beeley | 2,239 | 48.7 | −0.7 |
| Conservative | M. Cowen | 1,425 | 31.0 | −10.4 |
| Alliance (SDP) | J. Binns | 935 | 20.3 | +11.1 |
| Majority | | 814 | 17.7 | +9.7 |
| Turnout | | 4,599 | | |
| Labour hold | | Swing | +4.8 | |

Little Horton
| Party | Candidate | Votes | % | ±% |
|---|---|---|---|---|
| Labour | K. Ryalls | 1,964 | 55.4 | −19.7 |
| Alliance (SDP) | J. McKenna | 884 | 25.0 | +24.9 |
| Conservative | V. Holdsworth | 695 | 19.6 | −5.3 |
| Majority | | 1,080 | 30.5 | −19.8 |
| Turnout | | 3,543 | | |
| Labour hold | | Swing | -22.3 | |

Odsal
| Party | Candidate | Votes | % | ±% |
|---|---|---|---|---|
| Labour | R. Martin | 1,754 | 39.8 | −17.2 |
| Conservative | J. Warren | 1,647 | 37.3 | −5.7 |
| Alliance (Liberal) | D. Rowley | 1,010 | 22.9 | +22.9 |
| Majority | | 107 | 2.4 | −11.5 |
| Turnout | | 4,411 | | |
| Labour hold | | Swing | -5.7 | |

Queensbury
| Party | Candidate | Votes | % | ±% |
|---|---|---|---|---|
| Conservative | J. Rees | 1,941 | 39.7 | −11.5 |
| Labour | J. Smith | 1,729 | 35.3 | −13.4 |
| Alliance (Liberal) | M. Farrar | 1,221 | 25.0 | +25.0 |
| Majority | | 212 | 4.3 | +1.9 |
| Turnout | | 4,891 | | |
| Conservative gain from Labour | | Swing | +0.9 | |

Rombalds
| Party | Candidate | Votes | % | ±% |
|---|---|---|---|---|
| Conservative | P. Peet | 2,948 | 57.2 | +0.2 |
| Alliance (Liberal) | C. Svensgaard | 1,739 | 33.7 | +15.7 |
| Labour | C. Mullard | 469 | 9.1 | −6.7 |
| Majority | | 1,209 | 23.4 | −15.5 |
| Turnout | | 5,156 | | |
| Conservative hold | | Swing | -7.7 | |

Shipley East
| Party | Candidate | Votes | % | ±% |
|---|---|---|---|---|
| Labour | A. Miller | 2,116 | 52.7 | −10.2 |
| Conservative | S. Newton | 1,071 | 26.7 | +3.2 |
| Alliance (SDP) | H. Baines | 777 | 19.3 | +11.0 |
| Independent | J. Wills | 51 | 1.3 | +1.3 |
| Majority | | 1,045 | 26.0 | −13.5 |
| Turnout | | 4,015 | | |
| Labour hold | | Swing | -6.7 | |

Shipley West
| Party | Candidate | Votes | % | ±% |
|---|---|---|---|---|
| Conservative | S. Arthur | 2,866 | 50.0 | −4.0 |
| Alliance (SDP) | B. Clarke | 1,386 | 24.2 | +12.4 |
| Labour | G. Porter | 1,317 | 23.0 | −11.2 |
| Ecology | S. Shepherd | 158 | 2.8 | +2.8 |
| Majority | | 1,480 | 25.8 | +6.0 |
| Turnout | | 5,727 | | |
| Conservative hold | | Swing | -8.2 | |

Thornton
| Party | Candidate | Votes | % | ±% |
|---|---|---|---|---|
| Conservative | D. Downey | 1,891 | 51.8 | +7.1 |
| Labour | E. Spencer | 1,042 | 28.5 | −16.3 |
| Alliance (Liberal) | M. Howard | 720 | 19.7 | +9.1 |
| Majority | | 849 | 23.2 | +23.1 |
| Turnout | | 3,653 | | |
| Conservative gain from Labour | | Swing | +16.7 | |

Toller
| Party | Candidate | Votes | % | ±% |
|---|---|---|---|---|
| Conservative | V. Binney | 2,030 | 40.3 | −9.7 |
| Labour | R. Swindells | 1,812 | 36.0 | −14.0 |
| Alliance (SDP) | M. Choudhury | 1,192 | 23.7 | +23.7 |
| Majority | | 218 | 4.3 | +4.3 |
| Turnout | | 5,034 | | |
| Conservative gain from Labour | | Swing | +2.1 | |

Tong
| Party | Candidate | Votes | % | ±% |
|---|---|---|---|---|
| Labour | D. Smith | 1,632 | 51.6 | −26.1 |
| Alliance (SDP) | D. Tempest-Mitchell | 850 | 26.9 | +26.9 |
| Conservative | T. Hill | 681 | 21.5 | −0.7 |
| Majority | | 782 | 24.7 | −30.8 |
| Turnout | | 3,163 | | |
| Labour hold | | Swing | -26.5 | |

Undercliffe
| Party | Candidate | Votes | % | ±% |
|---|---|---|---|---|
| Labour | R. Sowman | 1,899 | 46.6 | −13.8 |
| Conservative | H. Ibbotson | 1,486 | 36.5 | −3.1 |
| Alliance (Liberal) | D. Ward | 690 | 16.9 | +16.9 |
| Majority | | 413 | 10.1 | −10.7 |
| Turnout | | 4,075 | | |
| Labour hold | | Swing | -5.3 | |

University
| Party | Candidate | Votes | % | ±% |
|---|---|---|---|---|
| Alliance (SDP) | A. Qureshi | 2,359 | 42.4 | +42.4 |
| Labour | A. Ayub | 1,867 | 33.5 | −47.2 |
| Conservative | D. Baggley | 821 | 14.7 | −4.5 |
| Independent Muslim | M. Rafiq | 518 | 9.3 | +9.3 |
| Majority | | 492 | 8.8 | −52.6 |
| Turnout | | 5,565 | | |
| Alliance gain from Labour | | Swing | +44.8 | |

Wibsey
| Party | Candidate | Votes | % | ±% |
|---|---|---|---|---|
| Conservative | A. Hodgson | 1,612 | 40.3 | −10.9 |
| Labour | A. Corina | 1,274 | 31.8 | −16.9 |
| Alliance (SDP) | L. Hudson | 1,115 | 27.9 | +27.9 |
| Majority | | 338 | 8.4 | +6.0 |
| Turnout | | 4,001 | | |
| Conservative gain from Labour | | Swing | +3.0 | |

Worth Valley
| Party | Candidate | Votes | % | ±% |
|---|---|---|---|---|
| Conservative | S. Midgley | 2,326 | 55.8 | +3.6 |
| Labour | A. Smith | 947 | 22.7 | −11.2 |
| Alliance (SDP) | L. Evans | 898 | 21.5 | +7.6 |
| Majority | | 1,379 | 33.1 | +14.8 |
| Turnout | | 4,171 | | |
| Conservative hold | | Swing | +7.4 | |

Wyke
| Party | Candidate | Votes | % | ±% |
|---|---|---|---|---|
| Labour | D. Mangham | 1,564 | 41.7 | −22.5 |
| Conservative | D. Owen | 1,191 | 31.8 | −4.0 |
| Alliance (Liberal) | R. Thompson | 996 | 26.5 | +26.5 |
| Majority | | 373 | 9.9 | −18.5 |
| Turnout | | 3,751 | | |
| Labour hold | | Swing | -9.2 | |
