= 1982 Harlow District Council election =

English local election

← 1980	6 May 1982	1983 →

14 of the 42 seats to Harlow District Council 23 seats needed for a majority
	First party	Second party	Third party
Party	Labour	Conservative	Alliance
Last election	33	7	2
Seats won	11	1	2
Seats after	33	6	3
Seat change	Steady	▼1	▲1
Popular vote	11,274	2,800	8,299
Percentage	50.3%	12.5%	37.0%
- Map showing the results of contested wards in the 1982 Harlow District Council elections.
Council control before election
Labour
Council control after election
Labour

The 1982 Harlow District Council election took place on 6 May 1982 to elect members of Harlow District Council in Essex, England. This was on the same day as other local elections. The Labour Party retained control of the council.

== Election result ==
1982 Harlow local election result
Party	Seats	Gains	Losses	Net gain/loss	Seats %	Votes %	Votes	+/−
Labour	11	1	1	Steady	78.6	50.3	11,274	▼4.1
Alliance	2	1	0	▲1	14.3	37.0	8,299	▲22.0
Conservative	1	1	2	▼1	7.1	12.5	2,800	▼17.6
Independent Liberal	0	0	0	Steady	0.0	0.2	52	New

All comparisons in vote share are to the corresponding 1978 election.

== Ward results ==
=== Brays Grove ===
Location of Brays Grove ward

Brays Grove
Party	Candidate	Votes	%
Labour	D. Howard	793	55.7%
Conservative	H. Willcox	630	44.3%
Turnout			41.8%
Labour hold			

=== Hare Street and Town Centre ===
Location of Hare Street and Town Centre ward

Hare Street and Town Centre
Party	Candidate	Votes	%
Labour	J. Cramp	764	56.2%
Alliance	C. Merryweather	596	43.8%
Turnout			43.9%
Labour hold			

=== Katherines With Sumner ===
Location of Katherines with Sumner ward

Katherines With Sumner
Party	Candidate	Votes	%
Alliance	P. Davis	943	49.7%
Labour	A. Evans	672	35.4%
Conservative	M. Tombs	284	15.0%
Turnout			44.8%
Alliance gain from Conservative			

=== Kingsmoor ===
Location of Kingsmoor ward

Kingsmoor
Party	Candidate	Votes	%
Conservative	L. Atkins	840	43.0%
Labour	R. Rowland	709	36.3%
Alliance	D. Harris	404	20.7%
Turnout			41.4%
Conservative gain from Labour			

=== Latton Bush ===
Location of Latton Bush ward

Latton Bush
Party	Candidate	Votes	%
Labour	S. Edwards	953	50.7%
Conservative	K. Clarke	506	26.9%
Alliance	T. McArdle	421	22.4%
Turnout			43.8%
Labour hold			

=== Little Parndon ===
Location of Little Parndon ward

Little Parndon
Party	Candidate	Votes	%
Labour	M. Carter	1,025	58.9%
Alliance	R. Baskett	715	41.1%
Turnout			40.5%
Labour hold			

=== Mark Hall North ===
Location of Mark Hall North ward

Mark Hall North
Party	Candidate	Votes	%
Labour	E. Morris	545	44.3%
Conservative	N. Armitage	414	33.7%
Alliance	P. Moulds	271	22.0%
Turnout			51.4%
Labour hold			

=== Mark Hall South ===
Location of Mark Hall South ward

Mark Hall South
Party	Candidate	Votes	%
Labour	S. Anderson	961	58.2%
Conservative	G. Dabnor	403	24.4%
Alliance	S. Tucker	286	17.3%
Turnout			40.7%
Labour hold			

=== Netteswell West ===
Location of Netteswell West ward

Netteswell West
Party	Candidate	Votes	%
Labour	M. Gerrard	537	54.5%
Alliance	R. Freeman	312	31.6%
Conservative	F. Burgoyne	137	13.9%
Turnout			39.7%
Labour hold			

=== Old Harlow ===
Location of Old Harlow ward

Old Harlow
Party	Candidate	Votes	%
Labour	S. Firth	1,060	49.4%
Conservative	S. Rigden	561	26.2%
Alliance	R. Winkie	472	22.0%
Independent Liberal	S. Ward	52	2.4%
Turnout			47.1%
Labour gain from Conservative			

=== Passmores ===
Location of Passmores ward

Passmores
Party	Candidate	Votes	%
Labour	M. Collyer	825	51.3%
Alliance	D. Filler	782	48.7%
Turnout			38.1%
Labour hold			

=== Potter Street ===
Location of Potter Street ward

Passmores
Party	Candidate	Votes	%
Labour	R. Bruce	900	66.0%
Alliance	P. Murray	464	34.0%
Turnout			41.5%
Labour hold			

=== Stewards ===
Location of Stewards ward

Stewards
Party	Candidate	Votes	%
Alliance	P. McCallion	1,121	69.5%
Labour	K. Ion	491	30.5%
Turnout			40.6%
Alliance hold			

=== Tye Green ===
Location of Tye Green ward

Tye Green
Party	Candidate	Votes	%
Labour	W. Hanley	1,039	65.9%
Alliance	S. James	537	34.1%
Turnout			39.7%
Labour hold			
