= 1982 Bolton Metropolitan Borough Council election =

1982 UK local government election

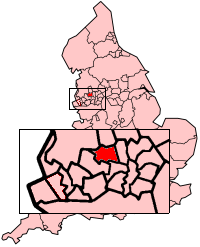
The Metropolitan Borough of Bolton shown within England.

The 1982 Bolton Metropolitan Borough Council election took place on 6 May 1982 to elect members of Bolton Metropolitan Borough Council in Greater Manchester, England. One third of the council was up for election and the Labour Party kept overall control of the council

20 seats were contested in the election, with 10 being won by the Labour Party, 8 by the Conservative Party and 2 by the Liberal Party After the election, the composition of the council was:

- Labour 36
- Conservative 21
- Liberal Party 3

== Election result ==
Bolton local election result 1982
Party	Seats	Gains	Losses	Net gain/loss	Seats %	Votes %	Votes	+/−
Labour	10	0	3	-3		37.5	27,018	-11.5
Conservative	8	1	0	+1		37.9	27,339	-4.7
Liberal	2	2	0	+2		24.3	17,547	+17.4
Communist	0	0	0	+0		0.2	179	

== Council Composition ==
Prior to the election the composition of the council was:

↓
39	20	1
Labour	Conservative	L

After the election the composition of the council was:

↓
36	21	3
Labour	Conservative	L

L – Liberal

== Ward results ==
=== Astley Bridge ward ===
Astley Bridge ward
Party	Candidate	Votes	%	±%
Conservative	D Johnston	2,088	57.9	−9.4
SDP	I Greenhalgh	822	22.8	+22.8
Labour	D McEneaney	698	19.3	−12.2
Majority		1,266	33.1	
Turnout		3,806	36.7	
Conservative hold		Swing	Labour to SDP 17.5	

=== Blackrod ward ===
Blackrod ward
Party	Candidate	Votes	%	±%
Labour	J Monaghan	1,768	47.6	−5.3
Conservative	I Ikin	1,197	32.2	−14.9
SDP	D Boyes	750	20.2	+20.2
Majority		571	15.4	
Turnout		3,715	39.5	
Labour hold		Swing	Con to SDP 17.5	

=== Bradshaw ward ===
Bradshaw ward
Party	Candidate	Votes	%	±%
Conservative	A O'Neill	2,135	55.6	−9.0
Liberal	A Halliwell	988	25.7	+25.7
Labour	G Lever	715	18.6	−16.8
Majority		1,147	29.9	
Turnout		3,838	35.8	
Conservative hold		Swing	Labour to Liberal 21.2	

=== Breightmet ward ===
Breightmet ward
Party	Candidate	Votes	%	±%
Labour	C Benjamin	1,745	42.8	−12.5
Conservative	A Chadbond	1,504	36.9	−7.8
SDP	D Lee	824	20.2	+20.2
Majority		241	5.9	
Turnout		4,073	36.4	
Labour hold		Swing	Labour to SDP 16.3	

=== Bromley Cross ward ===
Bromley Cross ward
Party	Candidate	Votes	%	±%
Conservative	B Hurst	1,885	47.9	−11.9
SDP	J Hampson	1,312	33.4	+33.4
Labour	D Doxsey	736	18.7	−21.5
Majority		573	14.5	
Turnout		3,933	39.2	
Conservative hold		Swing	Labour to SDP -27.4	

=== Burnden ward ===
Burnden ward
Party	Candidate	Votes	%	±%
Labour	J Mason	1,558	44.0	−14.4
Conservative	W Hall	1,553	43.9	−0.7
Liberal	W Crook	427	12.1	+12.1
Majority		5	0.1	
Turnout		3,538	36.7	
Labour hold		Swing	Labour to Liberal -13.2	

=== Central ward ===
Central ward
Party	Candidate	Votes	%	±%
Labour	B Iddon	2,163	68.0	−8.5
Liberal	R Hayes	534	16.8	+16.8
Conservative	G Kearton	483	15.2	+0.8
Majority		1,629	51.2	
Turnout		3,180	36.7	
Labour hold		Swing	Labour to Liberal -12.6	

=== Daubhill ward ===
Daubhill ward
Party	Candidate	Votes	%	±%
Labour	G Harkin	2,019	52.3	−8.1
Conservative	R Carr	1,379	35.7	−2.2
SDP	H Smith	466	12.1	+12.1
Majority		740	16.6	
Turnout		3,864	41.1	
Labour hold		Swing	Labour to SDP -12.1	

=== Deane-cum-Heaton ward ===
Deane-cum-Heaton ward
Party	Candidate	Votes	%	±%
Conservative	M Allanson	3,210	62.4	−8.0
SDP	I Hamilton	1,057	20.5	+20.5
Labour	J Knight	881	17.1	−12.5
Majority		2,153	41.9	
Turnout		5,148	40.6	
Conservative hold		Swing	Labour to SDP -16.5	

=== Derby ward ===
Derby ward
Party	Candidate	Votes	%	±%
Labour	G Riley	2,580	70.9	−21.5
Conservative	J Walsh	498	13.7	+8.4
SDP	C Moore	481	13.2	+13.2
Communist	A Johnson	81	2.2	−0.2
Majority		2,092	57.2	
Turnout		3,640	35.0	
Labour hold		Swing	Labour to SDP -17.3	

=== Farnworth ward ===
Farnworth ward
Party	Candidate	Votes	%	±%
Labour	P Johnston	1,442	60.1	−15.1
Liberal	L Bale	484	20.2	+16.3
Conservative	B Coote	474	19.8	−1.1
Majority		958	39.9	
Turnout		2,400	24.0	
Labour hold		Swing	Labour to Liberal -15.7	

=== Halliwell ward ===
Halliwell ward
Party	Candidate	Votes	%	±%
Liberal	D Walmsley	1,226	37.2	+1.2
Labour	R Johnson	1,214	36.9	−9.7
Conservative	L Keighley	854	25.9	+8.6
Majority		12	0.3	
Turnout		3,294	33.8	
Liberal gain from Labour		Swing	Labour to Con +9.1	

=== Harper Green ward ===
Harper Green ward
Party	Candidate	Votes	%	±%
Labour	L Williamson	1,641	56.0	−12.0
Liberal	L Sanderson	1,189	40.6	+36.7
Communist	T McKnight	98	3.3	+3.3
Majority		452	15.4	
Turnout		2,928	27.4	
Labour hold		Swing	Labour to Liberal -24.3	

=== Horwich ward ===
Horwich ward
Party	Candidate	Votes	%	±%
Labour	P Senior	1,820	40.2	−14.6
Conservative	S Dawson	1,689	37.3	−7.9
SDP	D Morris	1,014	22.4	+22.4
Majority		131	2.9	
Turnout		4,523	41.6	
Labour hold		Swing	Labour to SDP -18.5	

=== Hulton Park ward ===
Hulton Park ward
Party	Candidate	Votes	%	±%
Conservative	M Prince	1,768	52.1	−11.0
Liberal	H Wise	826	24.4	+24.4
Labour	E McCracken	798	23.5	−13.4
Majority		942	27.7	
Turnout		3,392	34.4	
Conservative hold		Swing	Labour to Liberal -18.9	

=== Kearsley ward ===
Kearsley ward
Party	Candidate	Votes	%	±%
Liberal	J Rothwell	1,645	44.9	+22.0
Labour	D Dingwall	1,449	39.5	−27.6
Conservative	A Waterson	570	15.6	+5.6
Majority		196	1.4	
Turnout		3,664	37.8	
Liberal gain from Labour		Swing	Labour to Liberal 24.8	

=== Little Lever ward ===
Little Lever ward
Party	Candidate	Votes	%	±%
Conservative	M Lawton	1,914	50.7	+1.6
Labour	E Walker	966	25.6	−21.3
Liberal	F Bridges	895	23.7	+19.8
Majority		948	25.1	
Turnout		3,775	42.1	
Conservative hold		Swing	Labour to Liberal -20.3	

=== Smithills ward ===
Smithills ward
Party	Candidate	Votes	%	±%
Conservative	D Priestley	1,974	54.9	−0.8
Liberal	F Harasiwka	1,023	28.5	+7.5
Labour	J Jenkins	597	16.6	−6.7
Majority		951	26.4	
Turnout		3,594	39.9	
Conservative hold		Swing	Labour to Liberal -7.1	

=== Tonge ward ===
Tonge ward
Party	Candidate	Votes	%	±%
Conservative	K Knowles	1,634	46.8	−1.5
Labour	C Skull	1,250	35.8	−15.9
SDP	E West	608	17.4	+17.4
Majority		384	11.0	
Turnout		3,492	37.2	
Conservative gain from Labour		Swing	Labour to SDP -16.6	

=== Westhoughton ward ===
Westhoughton ward
Party	Candidate	Votes	%	±%
Labour	P Jones	978	39.4	−32.2
Liberal	D Wilkinson	976	39.3	+23.9
Conservative	G Hanley	530	21.3	+8.3
Majority		2	0.9	
Turnout		2,484	40.3	
Labour hold		Swing	Labour to Liberal -28.0	
