= 1982 Gloucester City Council election =

UK local election

The 1982 Gloucester City Council election took place on 5 May 1982 to elect members of Gloucester City Council in England.

== Results ==
Gloucester City Council election, 1982
Party	Seats	Gains	Losses	Net gain/loss	Seats %	Votes %	Votes	+/−
Conservative	19				57.6			
Labour	8				24.2			
Alliance	6				18.2			

== Ward results ==
=== Barnwood ===
Barnwood 1982
Party	Candidate	Votes	%	±%
Conservative	M.* Smith	1,474	42.3	
Labour	A. Potts	1,156	33.2	
Alliance	R. Escolme	545	44.8	
Turnout		3,175	45.9	
Conservative gain from Labour		Swing		

=== Barton ===
Barton 1982
Party	Candidate	Votes	%	±%
Conservative	A. Gravells	964	43.0	
Labour	D. Davis	823	36.7	
Alliance	T. Smith	455	20.3	
Turnout		2,242	39.2	
Conservative gain from Labour		Swing		

=== Eastgate ===
Eastgate 1982
Party	Candidate	Votes	%	±%
Labour	D. Short	997	40.5	
Conservative	Ms.* I. Fowler	989	40.2	
Alliance	Ms. E. McGettrick	476	19.3	
Turnout		2,462	40.4	
Labour hold		Swing		

=== Hucclecote ===
Hucclecote 1982
Party	Candidate	Votes	%	±%
Conservative	P.* Arnold	1,502	46.1	
Alliance	R. Cox	1,205	37.0	
Labour	E. Andrews	526	16.1	
Independent	B. Storkey	25	0.8	
Turnout		3,258	52.1	
Conservative hold		Swing		

=== Kingsholm ===
Kingsholm 1982
Party	Candidate	Votes	%	±%
Alliance	J. Hilton	1,476	46.4	
Conservative	P.* Robins	1,307	41.1	
Labour	A. Ayland	352	11.1	
Ecology	J. Waters	44	1.4	
Turnout		3,179	54.5	
Alliance gain from Conservative		Swing		

=== Linden ===
Linden 1982
Party	Candidate	Votes	%	±%
Alliance	M. Welch	1,002	39.0	
Conservative	L.* Jones	900	35.1	
Labour	J. Zahra	638	24.9	
Communist	Ms. H. Healey	27	1.1	
Turnout		2,567	44.3	
Alliance gain from Conservative		Swing		

=== Longlevens ===
Longlevens 1982
Party	Candidate	Votes	%	±%
Conservative	G.* Goodwin	1,777	52.9	
Alliance	M. Butler	973	29.0	
Labour	R. Toomey	610	18.2	
Turnout		3,360	54.2	
Conservative hold		Swing		

=== Matson ===
Matson 1982
Party	Candidate	Votes	%	±%
Labour	Ms. J. Faux	1,074	46.9	
Conservative	Ms. J. Bracey	650	28.4	
Alliance	H. James	567	24.7	
Turnout		2,291	35.1	
Labour hold		Swing		

=== Podsmead ===
Podsmead 1982
Party	Candidate	Votes	%	±%
Alliance	R. Gibbs	1,698	59.2	
Conservative	Ms. M. West	613	21.4	
Labour	A. Leighfield	559	19.5	
Turnout		2,870	48.7	
Alliance hold		Swing		

=== Tuffley ===
Tuffley 1982
Party	Candidate	Votes	%	±%
Conservative	R.* Pitkin-Cocks	1,281	41.7	
Labour	Ms. A. Carter	918	29.9	
Alliance	J. Stone	870	28.3	
Turnout		3,069	52.0	
Conservative hold		Swing		

=== Westgate ===
Westgate 1982
Party	Candidate	Votes	%	±%
Conservative	H.* Fisher	1,009	43.8	
Alliance	R. Welshman	756	32.8	
Labour	F. Stevens	480	20.8	
Ecology	J. Eaton	61	2.6	
Turnout		2,306	42.5	
Conservative hold		Swing		
