= List of public art in Harlow =

This is a list of public art in Harlow in Essex, including statues, busts and other memorials. This list applies only to works of public art on permanent display in an outdoor public space and as such does not include, for example, artworks in museums.

== Town Centre ==
| Image | Title / subject | Location and coordinates | Date | Artist / designer | Type | Material | Dimensions | Designation | Wikidata | Notes |
|---|---|---|---|---|---|---|---|---|---|---|
| | Meat Porters | Market Square | 1959 | Ralph Brown | Sculpture | Bronze | 1.8 m high | Grade II | | Cast at the Corinthian Bronze Factory. |
| | Trigon | Broad Walk | 1961 | Lynn Chadwick | Sculpture | Bronze | 2.3 m high | | | |
| | Obelisk | Broad Walk | 1980 | Sir Frederick Gibberd | Obelisk | Concrete faced in Portland stone | 762 cm high | | | |
| | The Philosopher | College Square | 1961/ 1962 | Keith Godwin | Sculpture | Fibreglass | 163 x 76 x 68 cm | | | |
| | Ripple | Square at top of Water Gardens | 2004 | Diane Maclean | Three columns | Coloured stainless steel | 8 m high | | | |
| | Portrait Figure | West Walk, off Westgate | 1956 | F. E. McWilliam | Sculpture | Bronze | 1.8 m high | Grade II | | Modelled by Elisabeth Frink while a student. |
| | Vertex | Broad Walk | 1979 | Paul Mason | Sculpture | Carrara marble | 76 x 76 x 213 cm high | | | |
| More images | Family Group | Entrance lobby to Civic Centre | 1954 | Henry Moore | Sculpture | Hadene stone | 1.7 m high | | | |
| | Returning from Work | External wall by entrance to Central Library | Unknown | Heinz Muller | Relief sculpture | Bronze | 0.5 m high | | | |
| | Julia | The Playhouse, Town Centre | 1995 | Gerda Rubinstein | Statue | Bronze | 85 x 35 x 22 cm high | | | |
| | Ghost in the Machine | Rear of The Playhouse, Town Centre | 2013 | Tony Stallard | Display panel | Steel and neon | 7 x 2 x 0.05 m | | | |
| | Still Life | Westgate | 1985 | Fred Watson | Sculpture | Springwell stone | 193 x 206 x 127 cm | | | |
| | Chief | Opposite the Playhouse | 2010 | Nick Turvey | Sculpture | Corten steel | | | | |

=== Water Gardens ===
| Image | Title / subject | Location and coordinates | Date | Artist / designer | Type | Material | Dimensions | Designation | Wikidata | Notes |
|---|---|---|---|---|---|---|---|---|---|---|
| More images | Eve | Water Gardens | 1882 | Auguste Rodin | Statue | Bronze | 1.7m high | | | |
| | Upright Motive No. 2 | Water Gardens | 1955-56 | Henry Moore | Sculpture | Bronze | 3.3m high | | | |
| | Relief | External wall of sports shop by Water Gardens | 1963 | William Mitchell | Sculptural relief | Concrete | 150 x 1083 x 10 cm | | | |
| | Heraldic panel | External wall of supermarket by Water Gardens | 1961 | William Mitchell | Sculptural relief | Concrete | 150 x 1083 x 10 cm | | | |
| More images | Seven lion head reliefs | Water Gardens | 1963 | William Mitchell | Reliefs and mosaics | Concrete and pigmented resins | 120 x 240 x 10 cm | | | |
| | Wild boar | Water Gardens | 1970 | Elisabeth Frink | Sculpture | Bronze | 0.9m high | Grade II | | Originally in concrete, re-cast in bronze. |
| | Bird | Water Gardens | 1985 | Hebe Comerford | Sculpture | Bronze | | | | |

== North Harlow ==
| Image | Title / subject | Location and coordinates | Date | Artist / designer | Type | Material | Dimensions | Designation | Wikidata | Notes |
|---|---|---|---|---|---|---|---|---|---|---|
| | Sophrosyne | The Chase, Newhall | 2010 | Ekkehard Altenburgher | Sculpture | Norwegian Larvikite | | | | |
| More images | Solo Flight | First Avenue, Felmongers | 1982 | Antanas Braždys | Sculpture | Stainless steel | | | | |
| | Sheep Shearer | Adjacent to tenants common room in Momples Road, Ladyshot | 1965 | Ralph Brown | Sculpture | Bronze on a brick plinth | 0.7m high | Grade II | | |
| | New Town | Florence Nightingale Medical Centre, Church Langley | 2009 | Nicola Burrell | Sculpture | | | | | |
| | Chinese Dynamic | Tesco car park, Church Langley | 1992, installed 1994 | John Mills | Sculpture | Bronze | 270 x 270 x 100 cm | | | |
| | Kore | High Street, Old Harlow | 1963 | Betty Rea | Statue | Bronze | 1.5 cm high | | | |
| | Screen | Newhall Project Space | 1999 | Gerda Rubinstein | Sculpture | Bronze | 46 x 152 cm | | | |
| | Methuselah | Great Auger Street, Newhall | 2010 | Nick Turrey | Sculpture | Steel | | | | |

=== Harlow Museum grounds ===
| Image | Title / subject | Location and coordinates | Date | Artist / designer | Type | Material | Dimensions | Designation | Wikidata | Notes |
|---|---|---|---|---|---|---|---|---|---|---|
| | Well Head | Grounds of Harlow Museum | 1989 | Jane Ackroyd | Sculpture | Welded steel | | | | |
| | Stone seat | Grounds of Harlow Museum | 1957 | Ernest Adsetts | Decorated bench | Portland stone | 0.6m high | | | |
| More images | Metal Sculpture | Grounds of Harlow Museum | 1965 | Antanas Braždys | Sculpture | Painted, welded mild steel | | | | |
| | Sun Dial | Grounds of Harlow Museum | 1984 | Nathan David | Sun dial | Bronze, brass and stainless steel | | | | |
| | The Flame | Grounds of Harlow Museum | 2008 | Angela Godfrey | Sculpture | Portland stone | 155 cm high | | | |
| | Torsos | Grounds of Harlow Museim | 1955 | Karel Vogel | Sculpture | Ciment fondu | 1.0m | | | |

=== St John's Arts and Recreation Centre ===
| Image | Title / subject | Location and coordinates | Date | Artist / designer | Type | Material | Dimensions | Designation | Wikidata | Notes |
|---|---|---|---|---|---|---|---|---|---|---|
| | Wrestlers | St John's Arts and Recreation Centre, St John's ARC | 1957 | Sally Doig | Sculpture | Ciment fondu | 1.3m | | | |
| | We are the music makers | St John's ARC | 2006 | Angela Godfrey | Carved panel | Lime wood | 133 cm high | | | |
| | Chorus | St John's ARC | 1990 | Lee Grandjean | Sculpture | Iroko wood | 250 x 70 cm | | | |
| | Help! | St John's ARC | 1976 | F. E. McWilliam | Sculpture | Bronze on a brick plinth | | Grade II | | |

== South Harlow ==
| Image | Title / subject | Location and coordinates | Date | Artist / designer | Type | Material | Dimensions | Designation | Wikidata | Notes |
|---|---|---|---|---|---|---|---|---|---|---|
| | Shenzou | Addison House Courtyard | 2008 | Simon Pickard | Sculpture | Stainless steel | | | | |
| | Butterfly | Newstead Way | 2008 | Madeline Allen | Sculpture | Stainless steel | | | | |
| | Organic Form | Newstead Way | 2008 | Michael Austin | Sculpture | Bronze casting | | | | |
| | Energise | Leisurezone car park | 2010 | Claire Bigger | Sculpture | Stainless steel | 6.5m high | | | |
| More images | Echo | Staple Tye, junction of Parnell Road and Southern Way | 1970 | Antanas Braždys | Sculpture | Welded stainless steel | 3.8m | | | |
| | Letting Go | Gladden Court, off Paringdon Road | 1996 | Edwina Chaston | Sculpture | Fibrecem concrete | 137 x 152 cm | | | |
| | Ports of Call | Torkildsen Way | 2006 | Jonathan Clarke | Sculpture | Aluminium | 1.5m high | | | |
| | Six Cubes | Bush Fair Shopping Centre | 1972 | Shelley Fausett | Sculpture | Bronze | 2.5m high | | | |
| | Iceni | Colt Hatch | 1995 | Anthony Hawken | Sculpture | Portland stone | | | | |
| | Stone Carving 1 | Hollyfield | 1965 | Menashe Kadishman | Sculpture / relief | Stone | 240 x 76 x 68 cm | | | |
| | Stone Carving 2 | Hollyfield | 1965 | Menashe Kadishman | Sculpture / relief | Stone | 240 x 76 x 68 cm | | | |
| | Wave | Torkildsen Way | 2011 | Ovie Usher | Sculpture | Steel | | | | |

== River Stort ==
| Image | Title / subject | Location and coordinates | Date | Artist / designer | Type | Material | Dimensions | Designation | Wikidata | Notes |
|---|---|---|---|---|---|---|---|---|---|---|
| | Mill | Latton Mill Lock | 2007 | Nicola Burrell | Sculpture | Cast concrete | | | | |
| | Over the Weir | Parndon Mill | 2007 | Karen Murphy & Alan Freeman | Bridge | Metal bridge with glass inserts | | | | |
| | Flowing Onwards | Parndon Mill Lock | 2007 | Angelia Godfrey | Sculpture | Dunhouse sandstone | 121 x 150 x 121 cm high | | | |
| | The Flowing River | Harlow Lock | 2007 | Anthony Lysycia | Sculpture | Sandstone carving | | | | |
| | Short Stort Thoughts | Burnt Mill Lock | 2007 | Graeme Hitcheson | 3 carved spheres | Sandstone | | | | |

== North of Town Centre ==
| Image | Title / subject | Location and coordinates | Date | Artist / designer | Type | Material | Dimensions | Designation | Wikidata | Notes |
|---|---|---|---|---|---|---|---|---|---|---|
| | Contrapuntal Forms | Glebelands housing area | 1951 | Barbara Hepworth | Abstract sculpture | Blue Galway limestone | 305 x 122 x 915 cm | Grade II | Q26282978 | Resited to Harlow in 1953 from the Festival of Britain site in London. |
| | Julia | Sewell Harris Close | 1999 | Gerda Rubinstein | Statue | Ciment fondu | 85 x 35 x 22 cm | | | |
| More images | Donkey | Pittmans Field off Monkswick Road, Mark Hill South | 1969 | Willi Soukop | Sculpture | Bronze | 0.9m high | Grade II | | Cast at the Fiorini Foundry, Fulham. |
| | Shoal | Town Park pool | 2009 | Will Spankie | Sculpture | Kilkenny limestone | | | | |
| | Chiron | Forecourt of Moot House, The Stow | 1953 | Mary Spencer Watson | Sculpture | Portland stone | 1.5m high | | | |
| | Not in Anger | Stow shopping precinct | c.1975 | Leon Underwood | Sculpture | Bronze | | | | |
| | Pisces | Water Garden, Town Park | 1973 | Jessie Watkins | Sculpture | Steel | | | | |

== See also ==
- Harlow art trust
