= Gerda Rubinstein =

Dutch sculptor (born 1931)

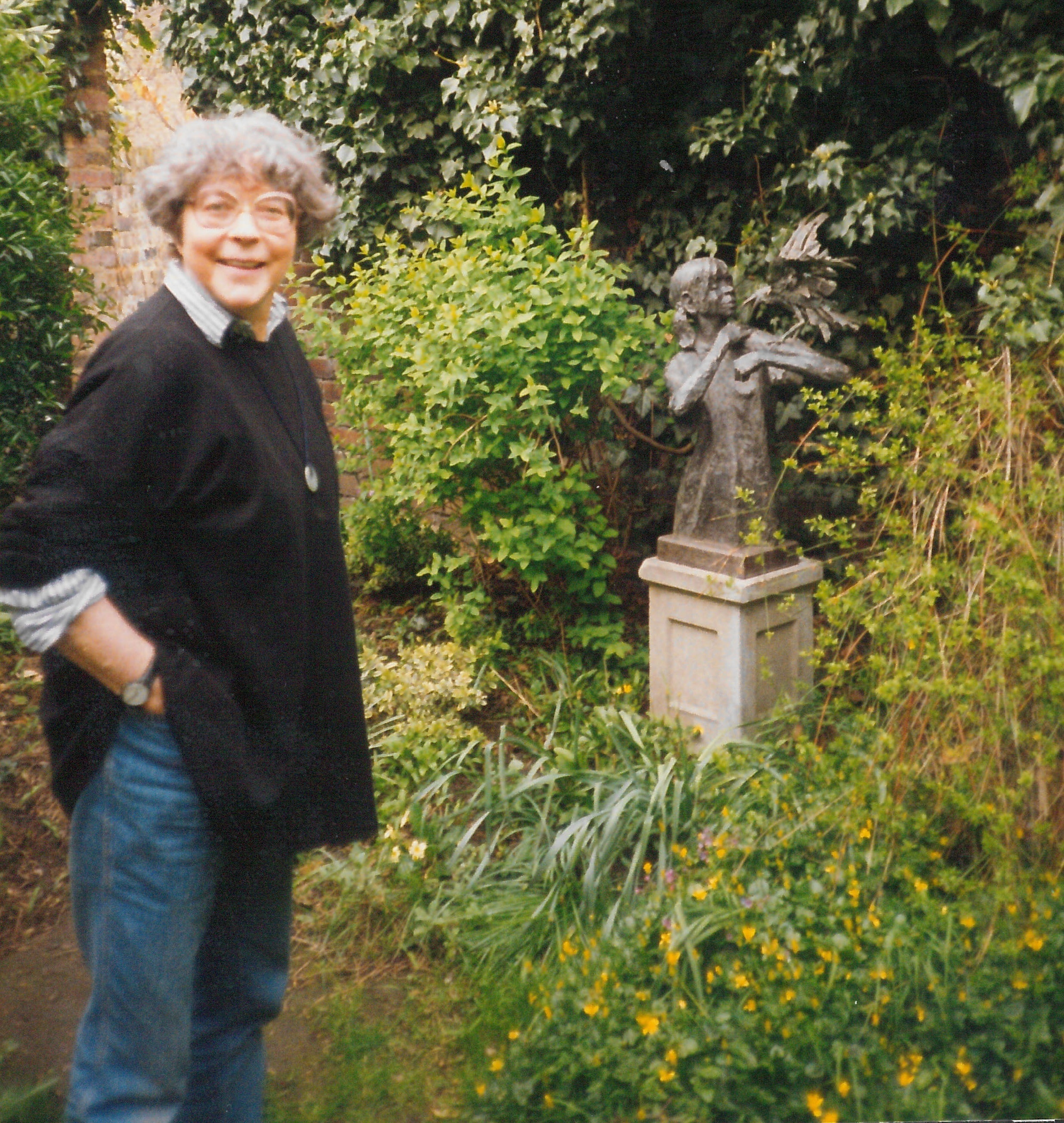
- Born: 16 July 1931
- Died: May 2022 (aged 90)
- Education: Rijksakademie van beeldende kunsten
- Known for: Sculpture

Gerda Ursula Rubinstein (16 July 1931 – May 2022) was a Dutch sculptor of figures, birds and animals based in England since 1959 or 1960.

Born in Berlin, Rubinstein moved at the age of 3 or 4 to Amsterdam, where after World War II she studied at the Rijksakademie van beeldende kunsten. In 1960 she left for England, where she had lived during the war years, and from 2013 she lived in Reigate, Surrey. She had historic links with Harlow through her early commissions from Sir Frederick Gibberd and the Harlow Art Trust.

Rubinstein attended the Rijksacademie in Amsterdam and then studied in Paris after receiving a grant. Returning to the Netherlands, Gerda's first major commission was for a carving in stone, unveiled in IJmuiden in 1956, followed by "Children Playing," a bronze sculpture in the Amsterdam Oosterpark.

Rubinstein continued to exhibit up until her 2017 exhibition "Observation and Insight" at Parndon Mill. She died in 2022.

== Life ==
=== Earlier years ===
Gerda was born in Berlin,1931. Her twin brother is Jan and her elder sister was the first female Dutch columniste #Renate Rubinstein. Her family fled to Amsterdam two years after she was born. In 1940, her father, Willem Rubinstein, an outerwear designer and garment-maker, was taken by the Nazis to Auschwitz concentration camp, where he died.

Since her mother, Hanne (nee Hamm), who was her husband’s PA and then a partner in his firm, was not Jewish, and their three children had been christened, they survived the World War II and the privations of the Dutch famine of 1944–1945.

The sense of positivity is expressed in her own words on her website: "The sense of freedom and hope that I experienced as a teenager in Holland, after five years of occupation, has never really left me and still colours my work."

=== After World War II ===
After the war, Gerda attended the Rijksakademie van beeldende kunsten in Amsterdam and was awarded a grant to study in Paris, under Ossip Zadkine. Returning to the Netherlands, Gerda’s first major commission was for a carving in stone, unveiled in IJmuiden in 1956, followed by Children Playing, a sculpture in bronze for the Oosterpark (Amsterdam) in Amsterdam.

In 1958, on a visit to London, she met Christopher Stevens, an architect. They married in 1959 and moved to Blackheath, London, where Gerda quickly became involved in the Blackheath Art Society.

An introduction to Sir Frederick Gibberd, the architect and landscape designer, led to commissions for several pieces for Harlow New Town, in Essex, and the Gibberd Garden.

Gerda exhibited regularly throughout her career, finding inspiration all around her. Her work can be found in many private collections, with further public commissions in Utrecht, Dudley, London, Watford and Bielefeld, Germany.

=== Later years ===
From 1967 until her retirement in 1996 at the age of 65, Gerda taught sculpture at the Inner London Education Authority's adult education institutes in Lewisham and Greenwich. She was an inspiring teacher, and her classes, as she said, were open to students from 18 to 80; many became close friends and several went on to become professional artists, thanks to her generosity of her time and expertise. She didn’t want to retire but it was mandatory as an Ilea employee.

After moving to Reigate, Surrey, in 2008, she continued to work in her garden studio well into her 80s. In recent years, she had become less mobile and her memory deteriorated. But she never lost her positivity.

== Style ==
The subject matter of Gerda features mostly people and a variety of animals including owls, flamingos, hawks, cats, dogs, donkeys, goats. She gained inspiration from places she lives.

She enjoys working on a commission and strives for the work to be self-explanatory without the need for a title. The experience of the sense of freedom and hope in her teenage year in Holland after five years of occupation in World War II has critical influence on the character of her work.

=== Working Process ===
The sculptures Gerda makes have developed from early carving in stone and then refractory brick, in which she carved negative shapes into which bronze was poured, to modelling in wax for small work or in clay for larger pieces, which are then cast in bronze or occasionally in cement or resin.

== Major Commissions ==
- Two children with building blocks; stone carving. Velsen, NL. 1956
- Children playing; bronze. Oosterpark, Amsterdam 1957
- City Tower; bronze cast in refractory brick. Harlow. 1970
- Gate post eagles; ciment fondu. Gibberd garden, Harlow. 1973
- Prof. Norbet Ellias; bronze. Bielefelt Univ. Germany. 1977
- Sir Frederick Gibberd; bronze. Harlow. 1979
- Brahms; bronze. Music Centre, Utrecht, NL 1981
- Picnic; 3m resin/fibre glass relief. Tesco, Lewisham 1988
- 36 Flying Birds; bronze. Hospital, Dudley. 1990
- Pensive Girl; bronze resin. Lewisham. 1992
- Counterpoise; bronze. Ladbrook HQ, Watford 1996
- Centenary sculpture, Three girls; bronze, St Saviour’s & St Olave’s School, SE1 2003.
- "Three Hundred", Cathedral School, Southwark. 2003/4
- Pool and fountain with 8 life-size Flamingos, garden of listed house in Blackheath SE3- 2010
- Exuberance, Makarova -bronze resins, house near Horsham, Sussex 2011

== Gallery ==
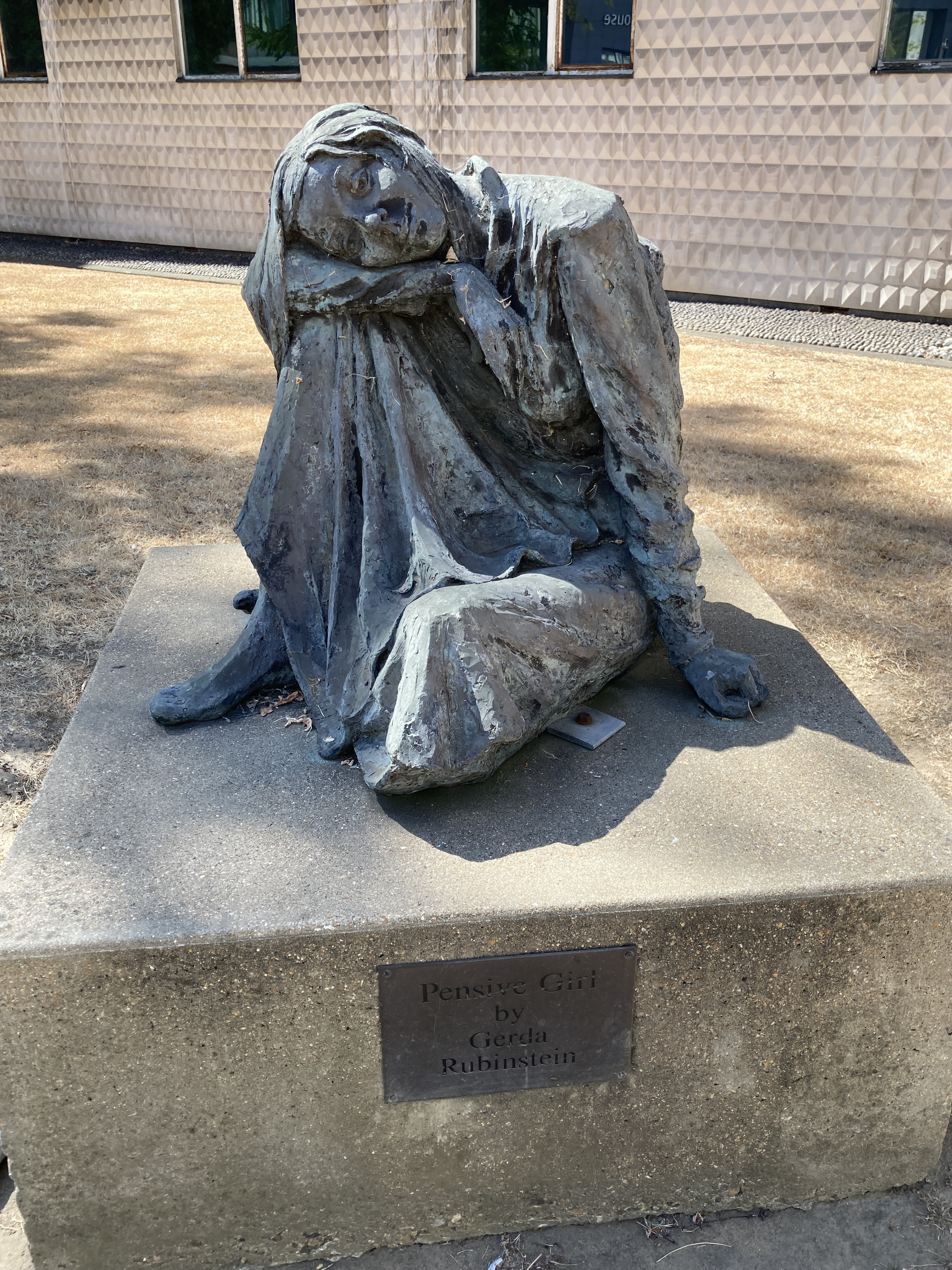
Pensive Girl, Thames Walk, Deptford, Lewishan

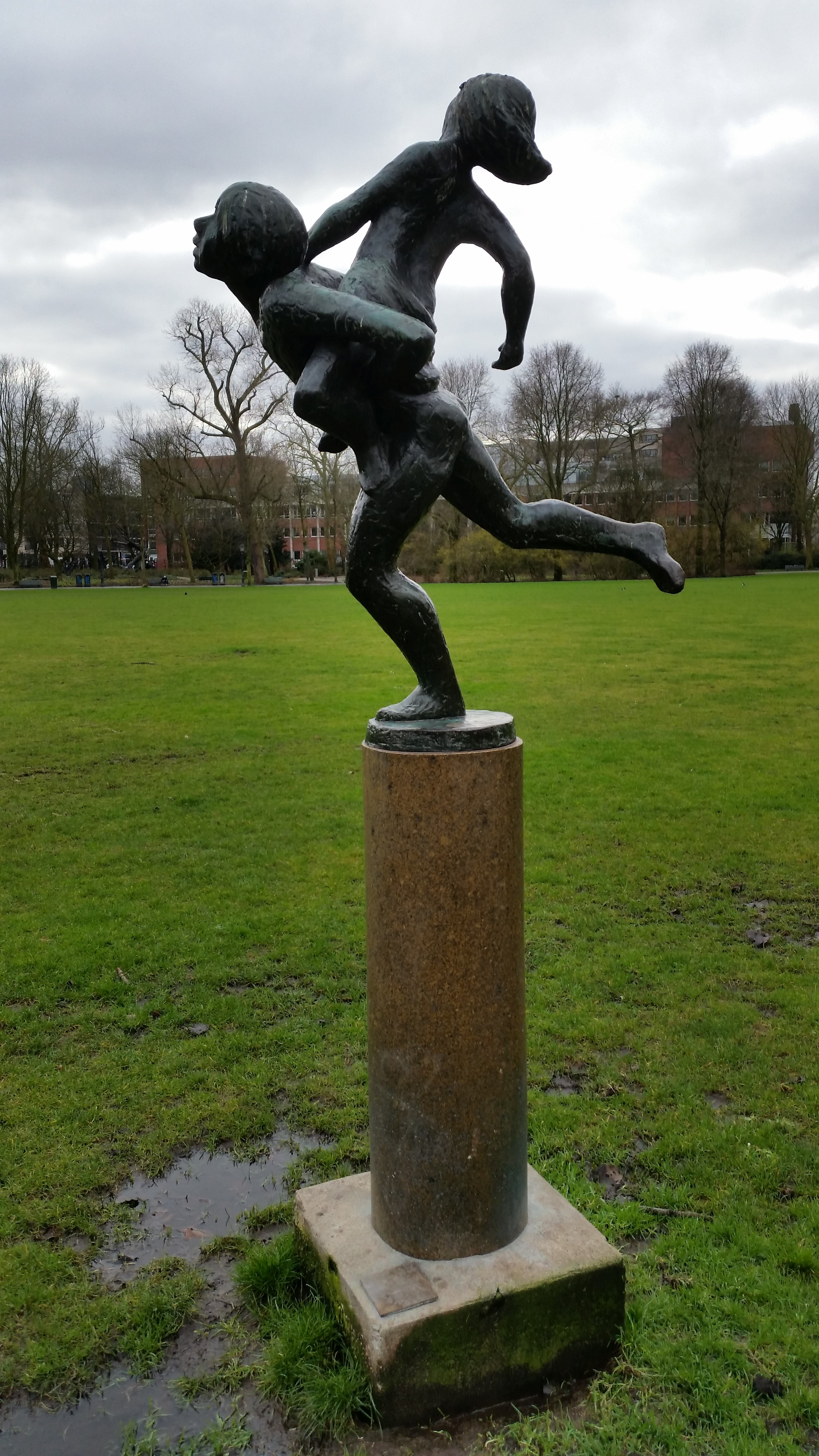
Spelende Kinderen, Oosterpark, 1957
