= Harlow Town Park =

Coordinates: 51.778°N 0.101°E

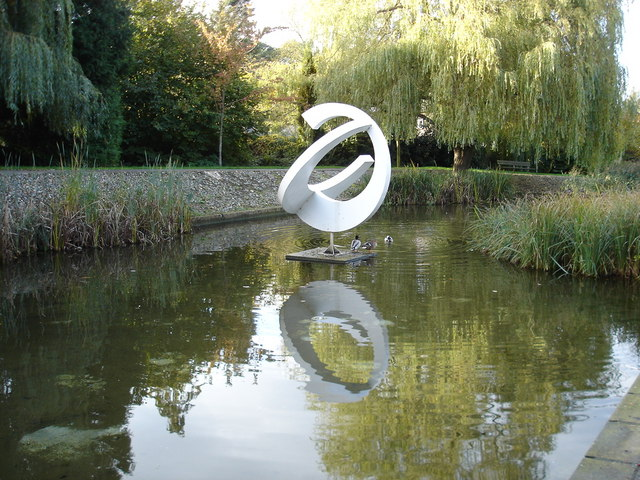
- Water Gardens in Harlow Town Park
- Interactive map of Harlow Town Park
- Location: Fifth Avenue, Park Lane; Harlow, Essex, England
- Area: 164 acres (66 ha)
- Opened: 1957
- Designer: Sylvia Crowe; Frederick Gibberd
- Operator: Harlow District Council
- Website: www.harlow.gov.uk/parks-and-culture/parks-and-green-spaces/harlow-town-park

Listed Building – Grade II
- Designated: 18 August 2020
- Reference no.: 1468217

Harlow Town Park is a 164-acre (66 ha) public park in Harlow, Essex, England. The park is one of the largest urban parks in Britain. It includes multiple gardens, a petting zoo named the Pets' Corner, a bandstand (which burnt down in September 2025, although the local council have confirmed plans to rebuild it), and the Spurriers House Café. It opened in 1957 and was designed by two of the most important figures in 20th-century landscape architecture in Britain: Frederick Gibberd and Sylvia Crowe. Its importance was recognised by Historic England on 18 August 2020 when it was added to the Register of Historic Parks and Gardens as Grade II. The park is set in and around the valley of Netteswell Cross, which includes a stream and a small historic settlement that retains a high level of original character. Several of the buildings are Grade II listed, including 6 School Lane, Greyhound Public House, Hill Hall Farmhouse, Hoppitts, and Marshgate Farmhouse. These buildings range in age from the 16th to the late 19th centuries. Harlow Town Park received a large £2.8m grant for renovations in 2014, which were completed in 2016. The park has been awarded a Green Flag on six occasions, recognising the quality of green space management. In 2019, the Park was voted among the most popular 10 parks in the country in the Green Flag People's Choice award.

== Facilities ==
The park includes multiple gardens, a bandstand (currently closed due to a fire), a skate park, a showground, playgrounds, paddling pools, an outdoor gym, picnic tables, and toilet facilities. Spurriers House was originally built as a private villa in 1868. Bought by the Development Corporation, it now hosts Spurriers House Café. The cafe is open year-round and the area around the House is now known as Spurriers Core. Pets' Corner is a petting zoo for farm animals in the northwest corner of the park and includes chickens, guinea pigs, llamas, and reindeer. The park originally had a swimming pool, but it was demolished in 2004.

=== Gardens and nature reserves ===
Multiple gardens have been planted and built across the park:

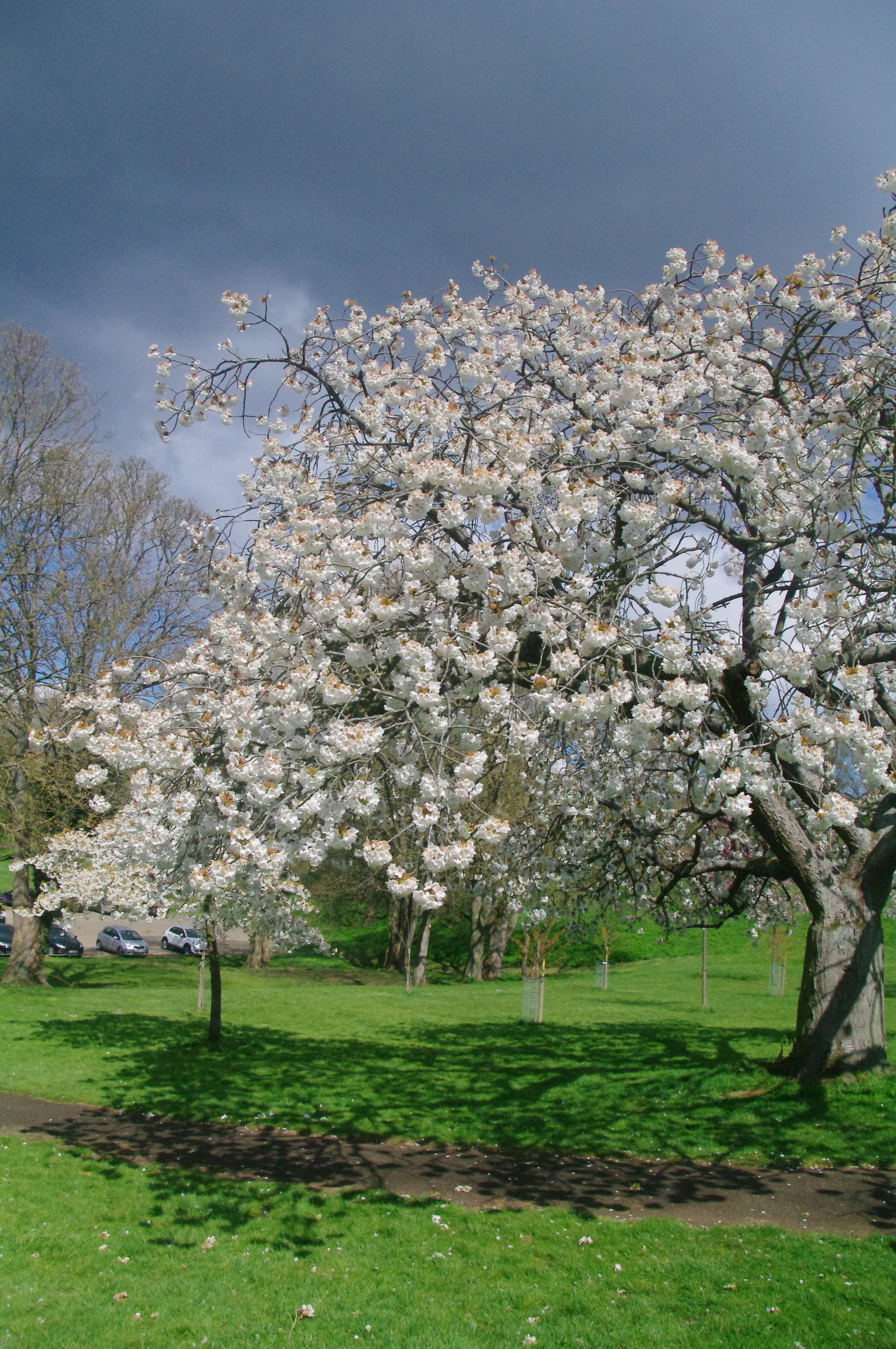
Blossom tree in Harlow Town Park

- Water Garden: Is the most popular and well known of the themed gardens. It was established in 1964, on the site of former watercress beds. The garden contains three pools connected by waterfalls. These pools are edged with cobbled banks and adjacent are rockery gardens and a paved terrace. A bridge spans across the water and leads to a field of rhododendrons. In the centre of one of the pools is the sculpture Pisces, by Jesse Watkins and added to the garden in 1973. It was part of a series of 12 artworks produced by Watkins based on the signs of the Zodiac. It was originally due to be exhibited at the Harlow Playhouse but was too large. The sculpture fitted in well to the Water Garden and as a result was acquired by the Harlow Art Trust.
- Forest Garden and Climate Change Beds: The newest forested garden established in Harlow Town Park was in 2019. Its goal is to bring awareness of climate change and to create a biodiverse ecosystem for local wildlife and flora, as well as to demonstrate and provide plants and fruit for sustainable human use. A circular bed of perennial flowers also sits in this section.
- Lookout Hill: was created in 1965 on a previously flat area to give a viewpoint over the Park. The material to create the mound came from construction material to build the New Town. It is located in the southwest corner of the Park.
- Newfoundland Garden: This garden, established in 1997 next to the skate park, has trees and bushes native to the Canadian island of Newfoundland. It was intended to jointly celebrate Harlow new town's 50th anniversary and Newfoundland's 500th anniversary of its European discovery. This project was inspired by Dr (later Lord) Stephen Taylor. He was a leading member of the Harlow Development Corporation and later taught in Newfoundland. This part of the Park has been planted with trees and shrubs native to Newfoundland.
- Peace Wood: This area was added to the park in 1957. The woodland of native trees had naturally established on top of a former 17th-century gravel pit. In 1997, it was designated "Peace Wood" in celebration of the end of the Cold War.
- Sensory Garden: One of the oldest gardens in the park is the Sensory Garden (originally called the Scented Garden for the Blind). It was established in 1984 and replanted in 2014 with the goal of creating a garden experience accessible for blind visitors. It is dedicated to the memory of Harlow Council member Milicent Bach. Although it originally contained only roses, the new plants here have distinct colours, textures, and scents. There is a "storytelling area" adjacent to this garden.
- Specimen Garden: This garden displays a wide variety of domesticated plants. It was converted from garden allotments adjacent to Park Lane. The original intention was educational, to show to residents of the New Town possibilities for their own gardens.
- Walled Garden: Originally the walled garden of Spurriers' House, it was much rebuilt in the 1950s. It was then used as the site of the Park's former plant nursery next to the Pets' Corner. This space now contains trails, beehives, greenhouses, and a community garden. It provides a base for Park volunteers who meet on Thursdays and some Saturdays. The Harlow Men's Shed is also located here.

=== Harlow Skatepark ===
Located within the southeast corner of the park is a 650-square-metre (7,000 sq ft) concrete facility that opened on 9 August 2008. The total cost to construct it was £357,500; the project was funded by Harlow District Council (£300,000) and Sport England (£57,500).

The first roller rink here was added in the 1960s, but neglected maintenance caused it to shut down in the 1970s. Demand for a new skate park was high, and new plans were put forth to the council in the 1980s. A temporary park was constructed in the 1990s to alleviate demand. However, permission for a permanent facility was not granted until 2006.

== Events ==
Each year, Harlow Council funds a free-admission fireworks night, attended by up to 15,000 people. The fireworks were cancelled briefly due to the COVID-19 pandemic but resumed in 2021. The Park also holds other regular events, including Parkrun and Junior Parkrun; guided walks, and 'social strollers'. The bandstand was used for music and other live performances, especially during the summer. Pets Corner also offers activities in the town park for school, nursery, and other groups of young people, including: pond dipping; Mini-beast hunts; Nature trails through the park; and Tree identification. A small indoor space at the learning centre is available for hire by civic and community groups to hold their own public and private events. During the 1970s, the Park held free music (rock) concerts. These were initiated by Dick Kilburn, the Harlow Council entertainment officer and Councillor Chris Crackett.

== History ==
=== Spurriers House and Farm ===
In the early 19th century, the land around what is now Harlow Town Park was agricultural. In 1837, a tithe was granted for a farmhouse and homestead in what became Spurriers Farm. Between c. 1861 and c. 1868, William Cox (1817-1889), a former Member of Parliament (MP) for Finsbury, London, had a house built called Spurriers House. Cox and his wife, Emma (née Angell), lived in the house until William's death in 1889 aged 72. In his will he left the house to Emma, who continued to reside there until her death in 1895. Emma Cox left the house to her spinster sister, Mary Ann Angell, who died in 1906.

In 1906 Lizzie Mewburn (née Angell) and her husband William Bowyer Chiltern Mewburn lived in the house. They emigrated to British Columbia for a short time, where William ran a small business and Lizzie worked as a concert pianist. William Angell Mewburn and his wife Olive lived at Spurriers House in the early 1930s. William Mewburn, Jr. worked as a builder and oversaw the construction of The Drive, an estate which still exists today. Mewburn went bankrupt in the mid-1930s and the house was sold.

Around 1935, Spurriers was bought by solicitor Thomas Herbert Chapman, who lived in the house with his wife, Hilda Marion Chapman (née King) until his death in 1950. Hilda continued to reside at Spurriers House before moving into a care home in north London prior to her death in 1960.

In c. 1965, Harlow Development Corporation purchased Spurriers House. An extension was added in 1971 to accommodate the Harlow Town Museum; however, the museum was moved only two years later and the house's former stable was expanded in 1973, where the park café operated. These expansions were demolished in 2016. The house is still in the ownership of Harlow Council.

=== Establishment of Harlow Town Park ===
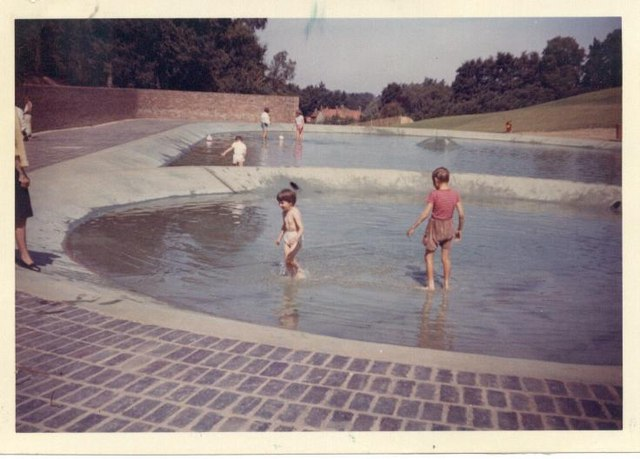
Children playing in the original paddling pools in 1964.

Harlow was designated a new town in 1947 and is one of the first generation of New Towns to provide much needed homes for people leaving overcrowded and bomb damaged London. Of all the New Towns around London, it had the smallest existing population. The architect, planner and landscape architect Sir Frederick Gibberd was appointed to plan the layout of the New Town. This included plans for a large public park. Between 1947 and 1953, Gibberd and landscape architect Dame Sylvia Crowe designed and refined a masterplan for the Park. The park was originally envisaged as a large "village green" and an area of open space within walking distance of local homes and transport. Gibberd opted to leave most of the woodlands as they were and develop around them, incorporating them into the layout. Additionally, he did not set firm boundaries to the Park and included the hamlet of Nettleswell Cross into the plans; wanting there to "be life in the park at all times". Keeping the original village buildings is an early and very unusual example of conservationist planning.

Ground broke on the site in 1956, overseen by Welsh architect John St. Bodfan Gruffydd and managed by the Harlow Development Corporation. The park opened to the public in 1957. Many of the new residents arriving in the town were families and paths in the park were graded to accommodate prams. Management of the park passed to Harlow District Council in 1959. Lack of funding for the Park and the New Town as a whole meant that construction on the park was slow until the New Towns Act 1959 was passed. By this stage A.R.W Webb at Harlow Urban District Council led on the physical works and engineering while Miss Webb and the Harlow Development Corporation advised on planting. Further land was added to the Park in 1964, 1965, 1971 and again in 1988. The bandstand and a public toilet facility (the latter now disused) were constructed in 1973. Crowe remained the park's consultant until 1974. The 1988 expansion added a 21-acre (8.5 ha) river walk along the River Stort, just north of Edinburgh Way. In 2004 a large housing development disestablished several features from the park's southeastern side, including the original swimming pool and a 1964 indoor sports centre.

=== Regeneration ===
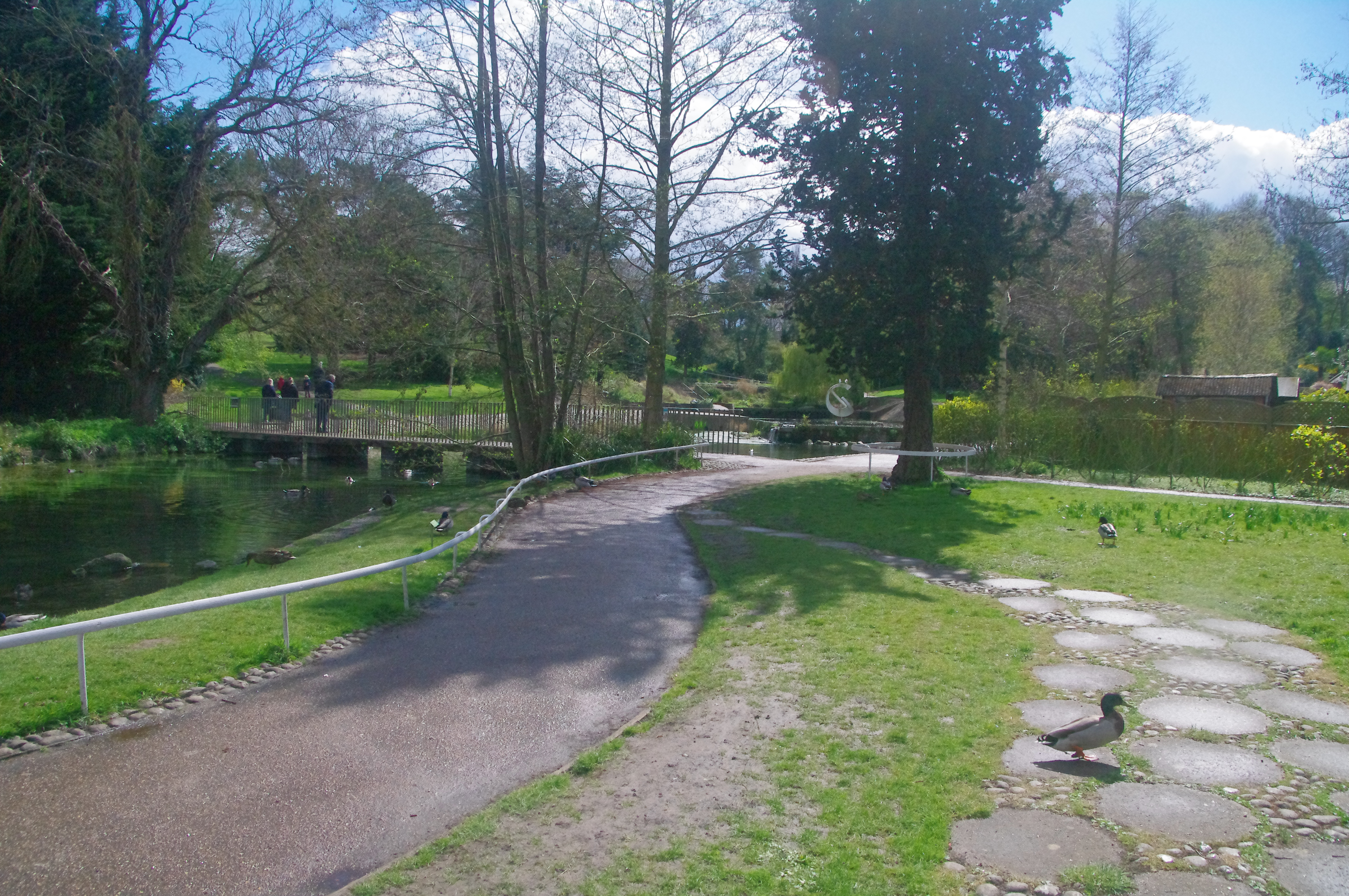
Walkway in Harlow Town Park, looking towards the Water Garden

In 2012, Harlow Council's Regeneration Team successfully bid and were granted a Heritage Lottery Fund (HLF) and Big Lottery Fund grant of £1.8m with match funding from the Council as part of a £2.8m regeneration project of the town park. Kaner Olette Architects and Allen Scott Landscape Architecture were hired to oversee these new projects. The regeneration work included demolishing of the 1960s built extensions to Spurriers House and conversion of the ground floor space into a new café, construction of a new Learning Centre and Events Barn, restoration of Pets' Corner, renovation and replanting of multiple gardens, and refurbishment of the bandstand.

In 2014 a new Education & Volunteer Officer (EVO) was appointed on a five-year HLF funded contract to deliver and Activity Plan within the park. Weekly volunteer sessions are held overseeing park maintenance as well as activities and guided walks.

On 18 August 2020, the Park was recognised by Historic England as a Grade II Park and Garden. Historic England note the high quality of the landscape architecture by Gibberd and Crowe which makes excellent use of existing landscape features including watercress beds, old gravel workings and woodland. It is significant as an example of a postwar public park, by two of the 20th century's most important landscape designers, whose main features are intact.

The Park's bandstand was destroyed in a fire in the early hours of 19 September 2025, with police investigating the incident as a suspected arson. Harlow Council confirmed that the existing structure was no longer safe and required demolition, and pledged to rebuild the bandstand. Work to demolish the bandstand began the same day.
