= Newhall, Essex =

Suburb of Harlow, Essex, England

Coordinates: 51.772°N 0.136°E

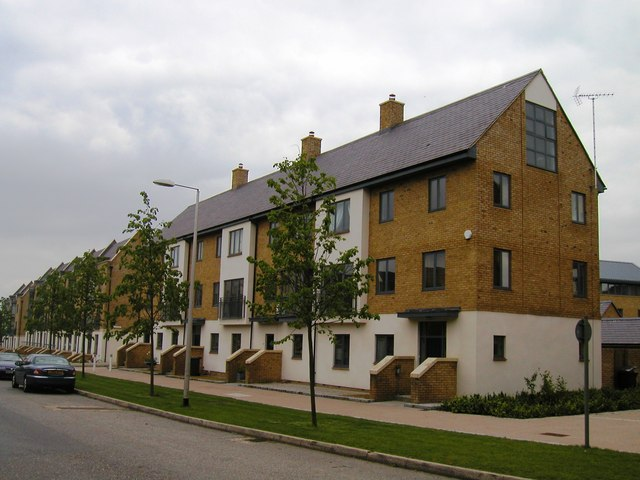
10-16 The Chase, New Hall, Harlow

Newhall is a new housing estate within Harlow, Essex, England. In 2009, it was being built on land originally forming part of Soper Farm. A landowner led development, its planners are Roger Evans Associates, an architectural practice based in Oxford. The design of the new neighbourhood is different from the rest of the first generation New Town, featuring striking contemporary architecture. The plan for Newhall precedes government set housing density levels, current sustainability standards and introduced design codes at a time when they were not common.

Influenced by the design principles implemented by Harlow’s masterplanner, Sir Frederick Gibberd. Newhall will eventually be another neighbourhood within Harlow with community facilities – a primary school, doctor’s surgery and retail units at it heart, serving some 6,000 residents. Extensive cycle tracks and an easily negotiated street pattern should encourage residents out of their cars to access the neighbourhood amenities. All homes will be no further than 65 yards from a MMO‘green space’. Around 2,000 new homes are being created and up to 40% of the land is being preserved as unspoilt open space for leisure, pleasure and amenity.

A wide variety of housing types combine with parking spaces and community facilities. Light commercial and retail premises are also planned to be constructed during the coming years.

To maintain the overall coherence of the scheme, the landowners and planners have retained the right to sign off the design of individual schemes as they come forward for planning approval. Although design codes exist, architects are still able to exert a lot of freedom of expression and it this that sets Newhall apart from many other new housing schemes.

The land at Newhall is being developed in phases. By 2009, the first phase of 560 homes had been largely completed. The second phase of 2,300 was due to get underway shortly afterwards.

Phase II has also been completed by Bellway & Linden Homes and this is approximately 800 dwellings. Countryside are currently building 985 new homes over 6 Phases, across 45 hectares. Upon completion in 2025/6, Newhall will be a community of over 2,135 homes.
