= Harlow =

Town and non-metropolitan district in Essex, England

- Town and non-metropolitan district
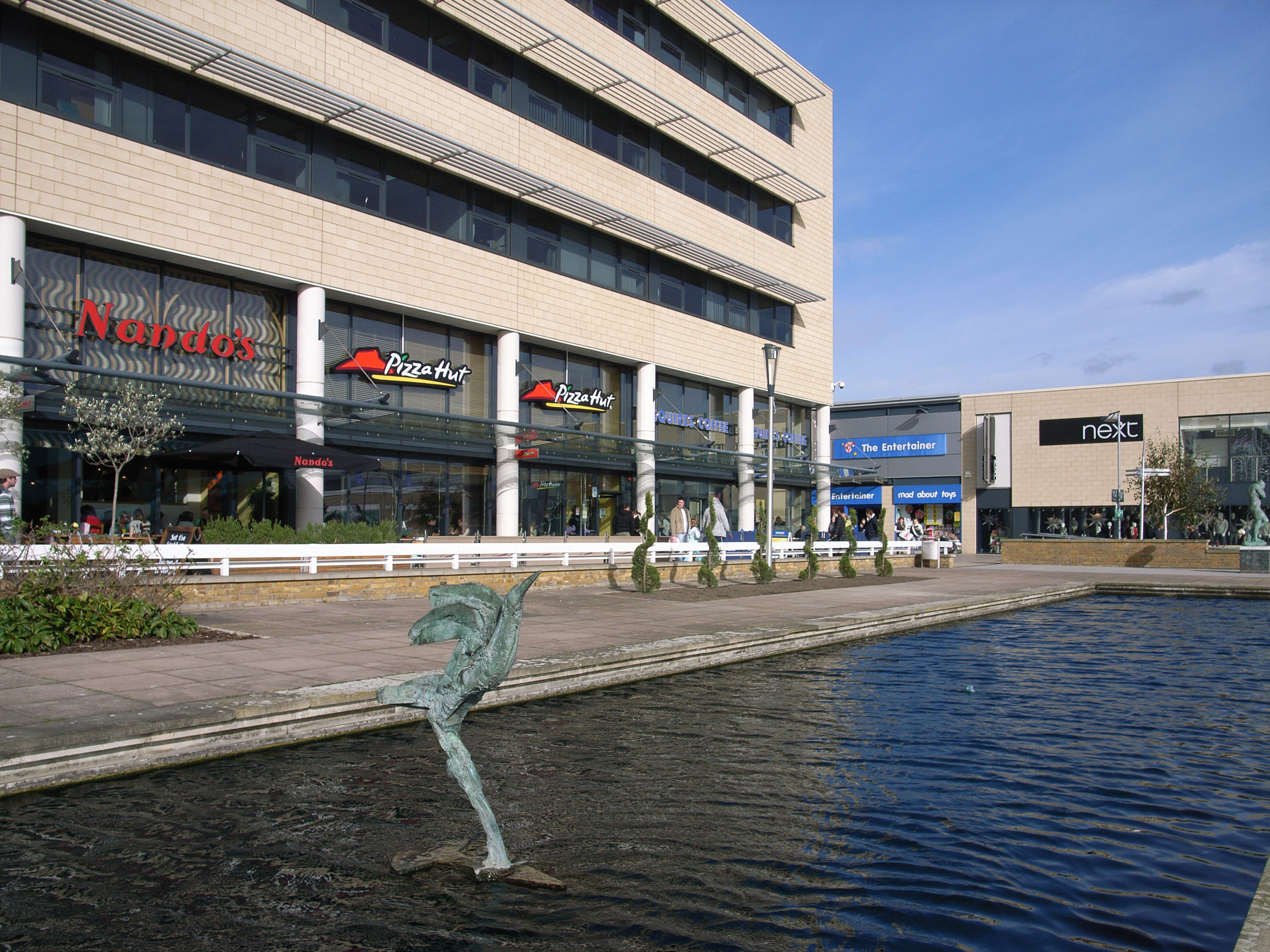
- Harlow Water Gardens

- Shown within Essex
- Coordinates: 51.779°N 0.128°E
- Country: United Kingdom
- Constituent country: England
- Region: East of England
- Ceremonial County: Essex

Government
  - Type: Non-metropolitan district
  - Governing body: Harlow District Council
  - Control: Labour and Co-operative
  - MP: Chris Vince

Area
  - District: 11.79 sq mi (30.54 km^{2})

Population (2021 census)
  - District: 93,300
  - Density: 8,360/sq mi (3,226/km^{2})
  - Urban: 93,580

Ethnicity (2021)
  - Ethnic groups: List: 82.7% White; 6.2% Black; 6% Asian; 3.3% Mixed; 1.8% other

Religion (2021)
  - Religion: List: 44.7% Christianity; 43.4% no religion; 7.9% other; 4% Islam
- Postal code: CM17–CM20
- ONS code: 22UJ
- Website: www.harlow.gov.uk

Harlow is a town and local government district located in the west of Essex, England. Harlow was a small town until the mid-20th century. In 1947 it was designated as a new town. Housing estates, industrial areas and a new town centre were subsequently developed, lying mostly to the west and south of the old town, which became known as Old Harlow.

The town lies on the south bank of the River Stort, which also forms the county boundary with Hertfordshire. The M11 motorway passes to the east of the town. At the 2021 census the Harlow built up area had a population of 93,580 and the local government district had a population of 93,300.

== Toponymy ==
The place name Harlow is Old English, but its meaning is uncertain; "army hill" or "temple hill" are both possible. The second element comes from hlaw, meaning "mound" or "hill", but the original meaning of the first element is not clear. One theory is that it derives from here meaning "army". A Bronze Age bowl barrow to the south of Mulberry Green reputedly served as the meeting place for the Harlow hundred in medieval times. This ancient mound may therefore have been described as an "army hill".

An alternative theory is that the first element is hearg meaning a temple or holy place, and that the mound or hlaw in question is not the one near Mulberry Green, but an Iron Age burial mound sometimes known as Stanegrove Hill, south of River Way. A Roman temple is known to have been built on this mound around 80 AD, so it may have been called a "temple hill".

== History ==
=== Early history ===
Some Neolithic and Bronze Age finds have been found in the area, with more substantial evidence of occupation from the late Iron Age onwards. Excavations at the Iron Age mound at Stanegrove Hill have additionally found some features from the Paleolithic era, and evidence that flint tools were made at the site during the Mesolithic era.

In Roman times, Harlow was the site of a small town. As well as the temple at Stangrove Hill, a Roman villa stood to the north of Old Oak Way.

=== Harlow before the new town ===
The Domesday Book of 1086 lists four estates or manors at the vill of Herlaua. The vill also gave its name to one of the hundreds of Essex. The manors were not individually named in the Domesday Book, but the largest of the four, owned by Bury St Edmunds Abbey, was later recorded as Harlowbury.

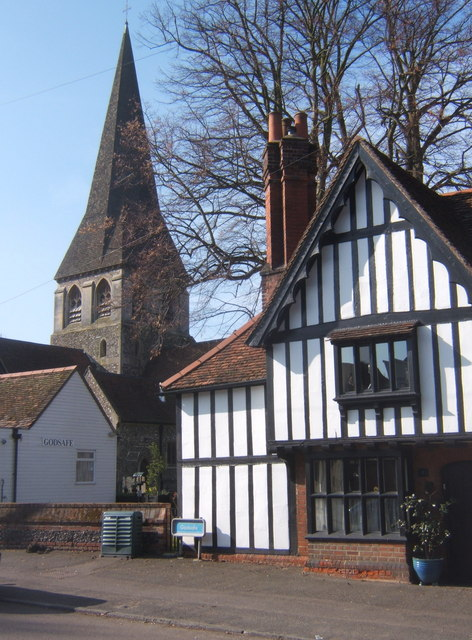
Tower of the Church of St Mary and St Hugh, seen from Churchgate Street

No church or priest is explicitly mentioned at Harlow in the Domesday Book, but a church is known to have been built on the site of the current parish church around 1044, probably replacing an earlier church on the site. The current church was built in the mid-12th century. It was initially dedicated to St Mary, but is now jointly dedicated to St Mary and St Hugh. The building has been significantly remodelled and extended on numerous occasions, leaving little older fabric visible.

In 1218, the abbots of Bury St Edmunds secured a market charter, allowing for a weekly market and annual fairs to be held at Harlow. Whereas the church is on Churchgate Street, possibly indicating an earlier centre of the settlement, the market was established 0.7 miles (1.1 km) to the west, in a new market place between Market Street and Fore Street. The fairs were held in the large open space of Mulberry Green, in between Churchgate Street and the market place.

There is some evidence that there was a further area of settlement to the north of Mulberry Green around the manor house of Harlowbury, but by the 13th century this area had become depopulated, leaving Harlowbury just comprising the manor house and its private chapel. The chapel was built around 1180.

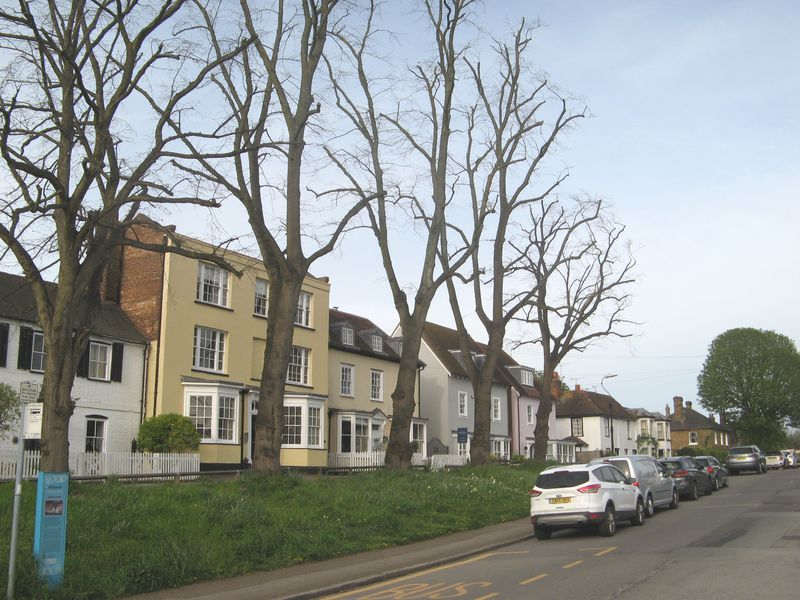
Mulberry Green, where Harlow's fairs were historically held

Medieval Harlow therefore comprised a number of closely adjoining but distinct centres: the market place, Mulberry Green, Churchgate Street, and the manor house complex at Harlowbury. These gradually coalesced into a single urban area. The wider parish of Harlow also included an extensive surrounding rural area with a number of other hamlets. The parish stretched from the banks of the Stort in the north down to the common land of Harlow Common in the south. The largest hamlet in the parish was Potter Street, which grew up near Harlow Common on the main road towards London.

A mill is mentioned in the Domesday Book. A watermill called Harlow Mill stands on the River Stort near the bridge on the main road to the north. The current building appears to have been built in the 17th century. The mill buildings have been converted to a restaurant.

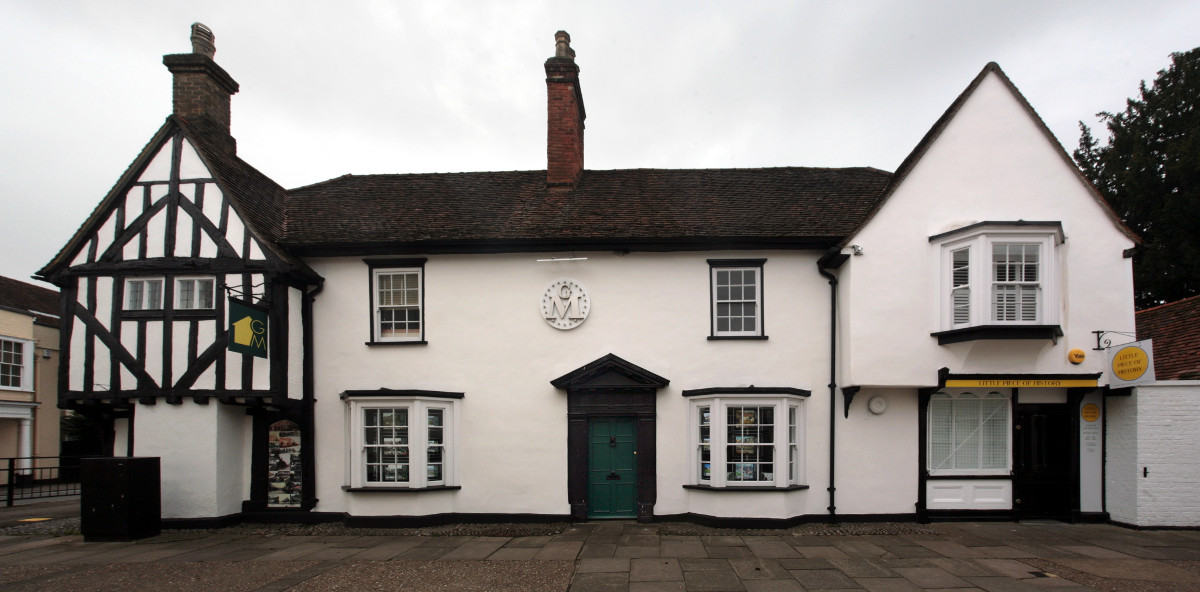
The Gables, Fore Street: 15th century building facing Harlow's medieval market place

The main road from London to Bishop's Stortford historically came into the old town from the south via London Road, turned sharply east at the market place to run along High Street, then turned north again at Mulberry Green to follow the road now called Old Road to reach the bridge over the River Stort by Harlow Mill. A shorter road from the market place to the bridge was built around 1830, later known as Station Road. As thus shortened, this north-south route was subsequently numbered as part of the A11 from London to Norwich.

Harlow's original market did not endure. It seems to have ceased operating sometime between 1592 and 1600, possibly as a result of the decline in the wool trade. The market was re-established in the early 19th century, but ceased operating again in 1850. The old market place between Market Street and Fore Street was gradually filled in by buildings.

Harlow railway station opened in 1841 on the Northern and Eastern Railway from London to Bishop's Stortford, which was later extended to Cambridge. Another station to the west called Burnt Mill also opened with the line, serving a small hamlet of that name.

Prior to the designation of the new town in 1947, Harlow was usually described as a small town, although it was sometimes referred to as a large village.

=== The New Town ===
Following the Second World War, the government adopted a policy of building new towns as part of the post-war reconstruction. The new towns were intended to ease overcrowding in London and other bomb-damaged towns and cities. Their modern housing estates and separate industrial areas were also designed to allow for subsequent population growth and to give industries which relocated to the new towns room to grow. The New Towns Act 1946 set the legislative framework for building the new towns. Harlow was formally designated as a new town on 25 March 1947. It was the fourth such new town to be designated, after Stevenage, Crawley, and Hemel Hempstead.

The masterplan for Harlow was drawn up in 1947 by Frederick Gibberd, who was later knighted in recognition of his work at Harlow and elsewhere. The town was planned from the outset and was designed to respect the existing landscape. Sylvia Crowe, the landscape architect, worked on Harlow New Town between 1948 and 1958. A number of green landscape wedges were designed to cut through the town and separate the neighbourhoods of the town. The old town became known as Old Harlow. Other settlements across the designated area for the new town included Great Parndon, Latton, Tye Green, Potter Street, Little Parndon, and Netteswell. Each of the town's neighbourhoods was designed to have its own shopping precincts, community facilities and pubs. Gibberd invited many of the country's leading post-war architects to design buildings in the town, including Philip Powell and Hidalgo Moya, Leonard Manasseh, Michael Neylan, E C P Monson, William Crabtree, Maxwell Fry, Jane Drew, Graham Dawbarn, H. T. Cadbury-Brown and Gerard Goalen. Goalen designed his first church in the town, Our Lady of Fatima, which is a Grade II* listed building.

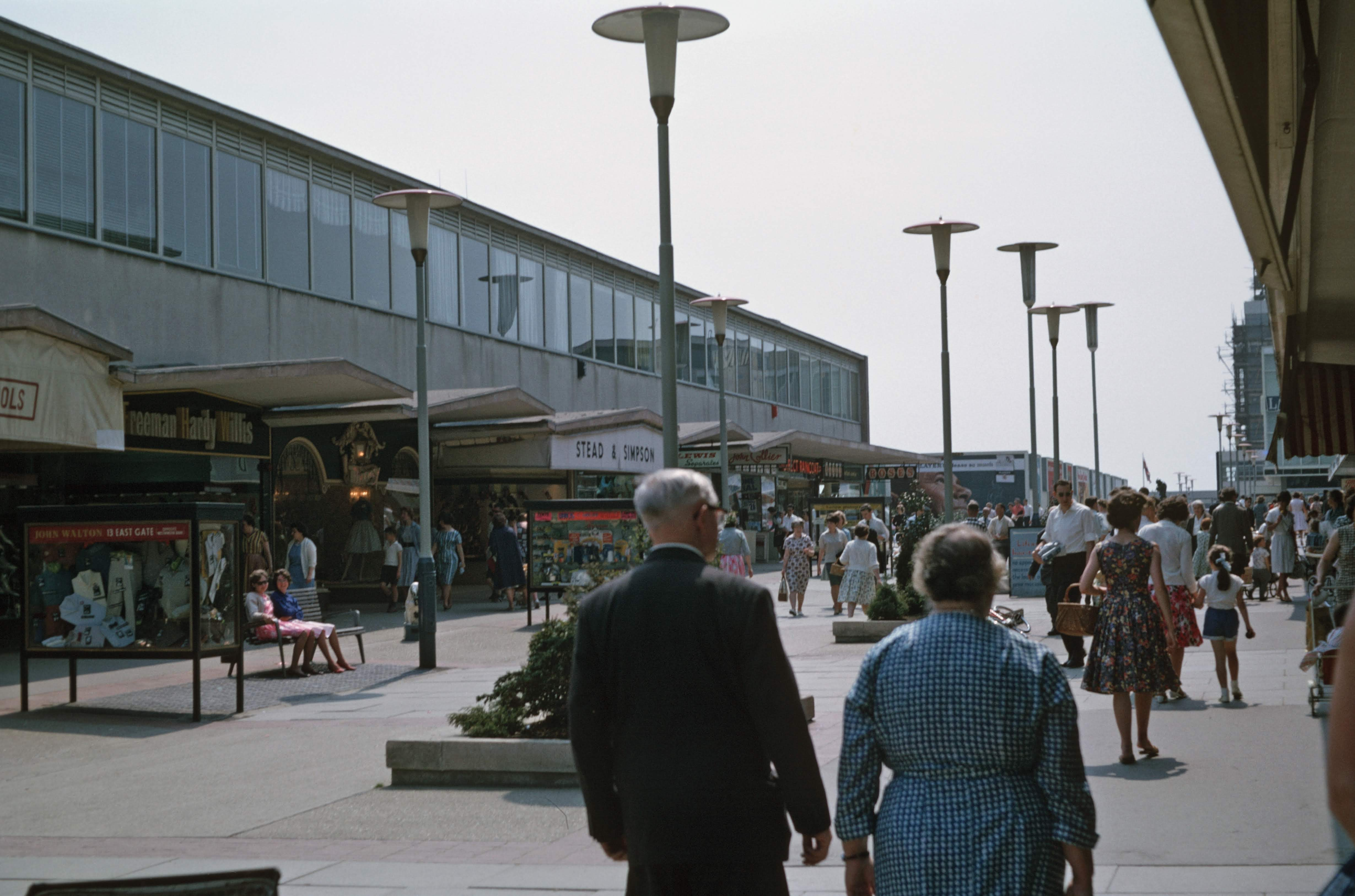
Harlow shopping centre in June 1963

The site for the new town centre was closer to the small Burnt Mill station than Harlow station. Burnt Mill station was rebuilt at a much larger scale, and was renamed Harlow Town on completion of the new station in 1960. The old Harlow station was renamed Harlow Mill at the same time.

Harlow has one of the most extensive cycle track networks in the country, connecting all areas of the town to the town centre and industrial areas. The cycle network is composed mostly of the original old town roads. The town's authorities built Britain's first pedestrian precinct, and first modern-style residential tower block, The Lawn, constructed in 1951; it is now a Grade II listed building. Gibberd's trompe l'œil terrace in Orchard Croft and Dawbarn's maisonette blocks at Pennymead are also notable, as is Michael Neylan's pioneering development at Bishopsfield. The first neighbourhood, Mark Hall, is a conservation area.

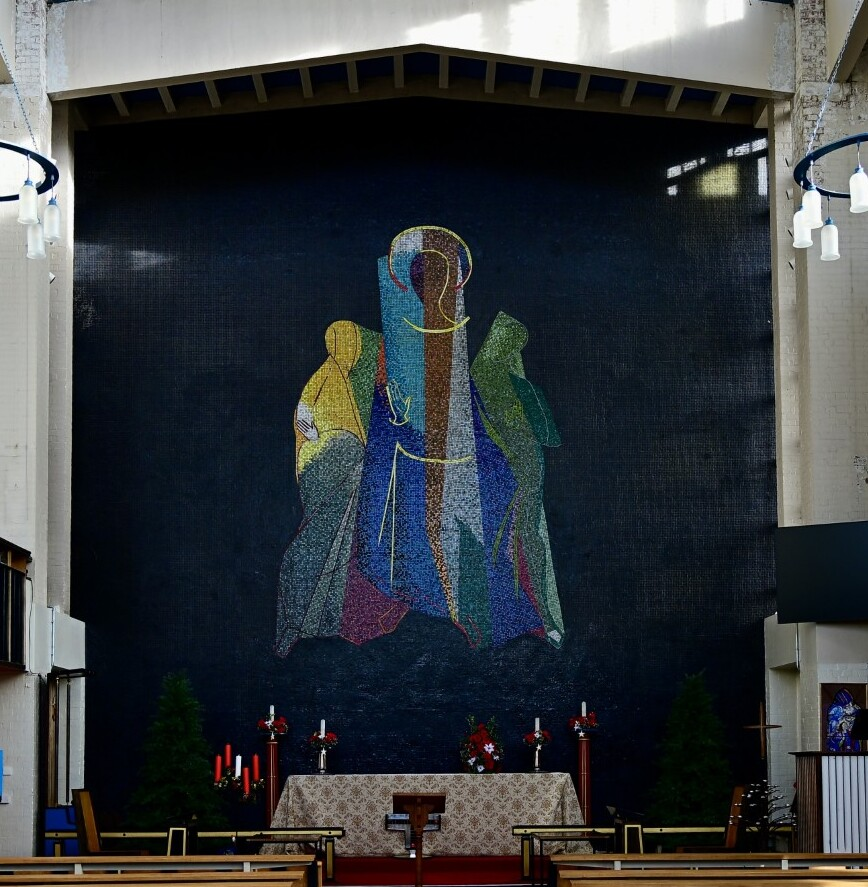
Mosaic by John Piper in St Paul's Church

The town centre, and many of its neighbourhood shopping facilities have undergone major redevelopment, along with many of the town's original buildings. Subsequently, many of the original town buildings, including most of its health centres, the Staple Tye shopping centre and many industrial units have been rebuilt. Gibberd's original town hall, a landmark in the town built in 1958, was demolished and replaced by Harlow Civic Centre and The Water Gardens shopping area in the 2000s. One significant survivor from the initial development of Harlow New Town is the Church of England Church of St Paul situated in the town centre. Built between 1957 and 1959 by Derrick Humphrys and Reginald Hurst in a modernist style, it is now a Grade II listed building. Inside it preserves a large mosaic made by John Piper in 1960-61 depicting Jesus at Emmaus.

=== Redevelopment and expansion ===
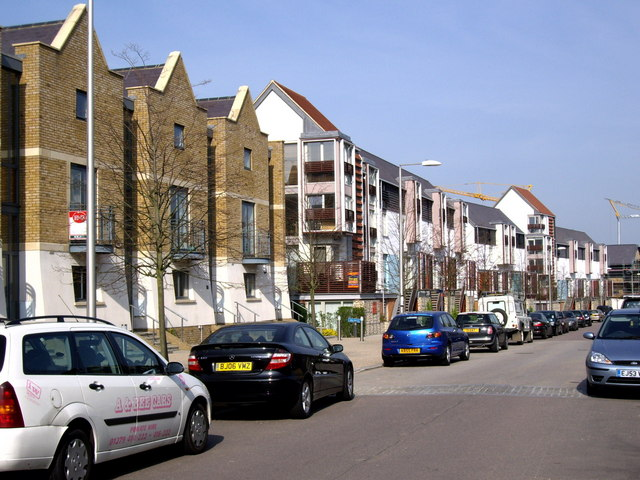
The Newhall housing development built circa 2007 between Old Harlow and Church Langley

Since becoming a new town, Harlow has undergone several stages of expansion beyond the 1947 masterplan, starting with the Sumners and Katherines estates in the 1970s to the west of the town. Since then, Harlow has further expanded with the Church Langley estate completed in 2005, and the Newhall development built in the early 2000s. The Harlow Gateway Scheme, also completed, first involved the relocation of the Harlow Football Stadium and the building of a new hotel, apartments and a restaurant adjacent to Harlow Town railway station. Phase 2 of this scheme involved the construction of 530 eco-homes on the former sports centre site and the building of the Harlow Leisurezone adjacent to the town's college in the early 2010s.

The south of the town centre also underwent major regeneration, with the new Civic Centre being built and the town's Water Gardens being redeveloped in the 2000s, a landscape listed by English Heritage.

In 2011, the government announced the creation of an enterprise zone in the town. Harlow Enterprise Zone consists of two separate sites under development, at Templefields and London Road, with the London Road site divided into north and south business parks.

In 2022, Harlow Council was awarded £23.7 million from the government's Towns Fund to be used for several large investments in the town. These include the development of a new bus station and transport hub, regeneration of Broad Walk in the town and a new sustainable transport corridor between the town centre and Harlow Town station. The majority of these works are underway as of mid 2024, with completion of the programme expected by March 2026.

In 2017, the government designated the "Harlow and Gilston Garden Town" as an initiative to provide new housing in the area around Harlow, including on land beyond the current district boundaries in the neighbouring Epping Forest District and north of the River Stort around the village of Gilston in East Hertfordshire. Planning permission for 10,000 homes and supporting infrastructure in the Gilston area was granted in 2025.

=== Permitted development (office to residential) flats ===
A government policy to allow developers to convert office space to residential has been criticised for leading to a proliferation of new 'rabbit hutch'-sized flats, which are then let to London-borough waiting-list families. These are erected under permitted development rights which mean the local authority cannot refuse planning permission.

== Environment ==
A major feature of Harlow New Town is its green spaces; over one third of the district is parkland or fields containing public footpaths. One of the original design features of Gibberd's masterplan is the Green Wedges in the town, designed to provide open space for wildlife and recreation and to separate neighbourhoods. 23% of the district is designated as Green Wedge. The Green Wedges are protected from inappropriate development, through the Local Plan.

The town is entirely surrounded by Green Belt land, a land designation which originated in London to prevent the city sprawling, and 21% of the district is allocated as Green Belt. The National Planning Policy Framework states that one of the purposes of Green Belt land is to protect unrestricted sprawl from large built-up areas.

Harlow Town Park, at a size of 71.6-hectares (just under 1 km^{2}), is one of the largest urban parks in the country. The multi-functional park has been used for recreation and enjoyment for over 50 years. This park is in the centre Netteswell ward and is between the town centre and the railway station, both of which are within walking distance of the park, which is a natural thoroughfare from the station to the town centre.

There are only 12 parks with significant post-war element on the English Heritage 'Register of Parks'. With these Harlow is seen as one of the first examples of a civic scheme to marry the modern science of town and country planning.

== Economy ==
Harlow was originally expected to provide a majority of employment opportunities in manufacturing, with two major developments of The Pinnacles and Templefields providing the biggest employers in the region; as with the rest of the country, this manufacturing base has declined and Harlow has had to adjust.

The original manufacturing took the form of a biscuit factory, on the Pinnacles. Owned and run as a co-op, it provided employment to the town for over 50 years, before closing in 2002. It has since been demolished and the site now has small industrial units. At its peak, the factory employed over 500 people.

Raytheon and GlaxoSmithKline both have large premises within the town. In July 2017 Public Health England had bought the vacant site from GSK (GlaxoSmithKline) hoping to move altogether 2,745 jobs there, of which about 500 are from Porton Down.

Nortel had a large site on the eastern edge of the town, acquired when STC was bought in 1991, and it was here that Charles K. Kao developed optical fibre data transmission. Nortel had a much reduced presence prior to the firm's closure in 2013. The site now is host to electronics, education and housing companies.

One of Europe's leading online golf stores, Onlinegolf, is based in Harlow.

Unemployment is frequently around 10%, higher than the national average in the UK. Harlow also has a large number of people in social housing, almost 30% of dwellings being housing association and local authority owned, and many more privately rented.

== Governance ==
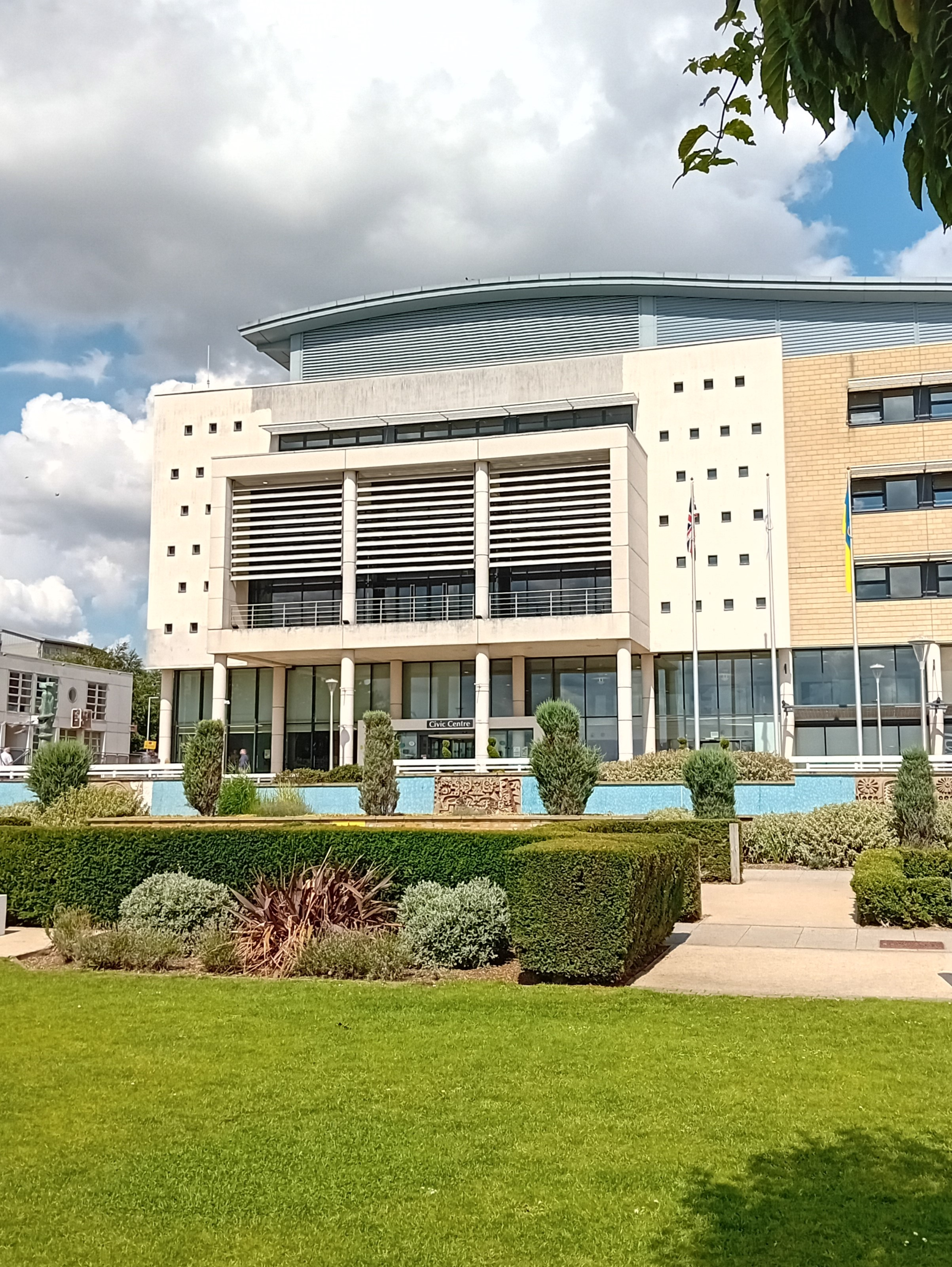
Harlow Civic Centre at the Water Gardens

There are two tiers of local government covering Harlow, at district and county level: Harlow District Council and Essex County Council. The district council has been controlled by the Conservative Party since 2021. It is based at Harlow Civic Centre at the Water Gardens in the town centre.

For national elections, the town forms part of the Harlow constituency, which also includes adjoining rural areas. Since the 2024 general election the constituency has been represented by Chris Vince of the Labour Party. He defeated Conservative candidate Hannah Ellis with a majority of 2,504 (5.8%).

In 2015 Harlow was the first town in Britain to take out a district-wide injunction against unauthorised encampments by Travellers. Following a court hearing in July 2020, Harlow Council withdrew the injunction.

=== Administrative history ===
Harlow was an ancient parish, which also gave its name to the Harlow Hundred of Essex. When elected parish and district councils were established in 1894, Harlow was given a parish council and included in the Epping Rural District.

The designated area for the new town broadly covered the five ancient parishes of Harlow, Latton, Netteswell, Great Parndon, and Little Parndon. In 1946, the year before the designation of Harlow as a new town, the parish of Little Parndon was absorbed into the neighbouring parish of Netteswell. Following the designation of the new town, there was a need for more wide-ranging changes. In 1949, the parish of Latton was absorbed into the parish of Harlow, and a joint committee of the three remaining parish councils in the area (Harlow, Great Parndon, and Netteswell) was established to negotiate with the Harlow Development Corporation that had been set up to deliver the new town.

In 1955, the parishes of Great Parndon and Netteswell were also absorbed into Harlow. There were also some adjustments to the boundaries with the neighbouring parishes of Epping Upland, Matching, North Weald Bassett, Roydon and Sheering, to bring the whole site for the new town into a single parish, and also to remove some peripheral parts of the old Harlow parish which lay beyond the new town's designated area. At the same time, the enlarged parish of Harlow was made an urban district, making it independent from the old rural district council. Harlow Urban District Council gradually took over the functions which had been performed by the development corporation.

Urban districts were abolished in 1974 under the Local Government Act 1972. A new non-metropolitan district of Harlow was created covering the same area as the former Harlow Urban District. The development corporation was wound up in 1980 and its remaining functions transferred to the district council.

In March 2026, the government announced that it would abolish the district in 2028 as part of local government reform across Essex. These proposals were withdrawn in September 2026.

== Transport ==
=== Railway ===
Harlow is served by two railway stations: Harlow Town and Harlow Mill; both are served by trains between London Liverpool Street and Cambridge. Harlow Town is also a stop on the Stansted Express, providing frequent services between London and Stansted Airport. All trains serving both stations are operated by Greater Anglia.

There are also frequent bus services from the town centre to Epping tube station, which is on London Underground's Central line.

In 2021, Harlow District Council proposed extending the Central line from its eastern terminus at Epping to Harlow. It argued this would reduce travel times to Epping and London, and help with efforts add 19,000 new homes to the town and expand the population to 130,000. However, no funding has been allocated for this proposed extension.

=== Road ===
Harlow can be accessed from junctions 7 and 7a of the M11 motorway, which runs from London to Cambridge. Junction 7 provides links to the southern areas of town, such as Church Langley and Potter Street. Junction 7a, located close to Old Harlow, opened in 2022. The M11 motorway was originally planned to pass to the west of Harlow. Having planned accordingly for one of the two big industrial estates to be built to the west of the town for easy motorway access, Sir Fredrick Gibberd was appalled when the motorway was eventually built to the east of the town instead, describing it as "just about the most monstrous thing to ever happen to me as a planner" during a 1982 interview. The section of the motorway from Bishop's Stortford to London, passing Harlow, opened in 1977. The old A11 route through the town, which had already been diverted to bypass Old Harlow and Potter Street to the west as part of an earlier phase of the development of the new town, was subsequently renumbered, becoming part of the A414 and A1184.

The M11 motorway links the town to Stansted Airport, the A120 to Braintree via Great Dunmow, and the M25 London Orbital motorway.

Running through the town is the A414, a major road between Hemel Hempstead and Maldon; it links the town with the A10 to the west, which runs between London and King's Lynn. Another major road running from Harlow is the A1184, which leads to the nearby town of Bishop's Stortford via Sawbridgeworth.

=== Air ===
Bishop's Stortford is the closest large town to Stansted Airport, though Harlow is only 10 miles (16 kilometres) from this major transport hub and therefore provides several hundred airport employees. The airport operator withdrew a planning application for a second runway after the General Election of 2010, when all major political parties opposed it. Further plans to expand the airport to boost capacity were proposed in 2020, but were rejected by Uttlesford District Council.

=== Bus ===
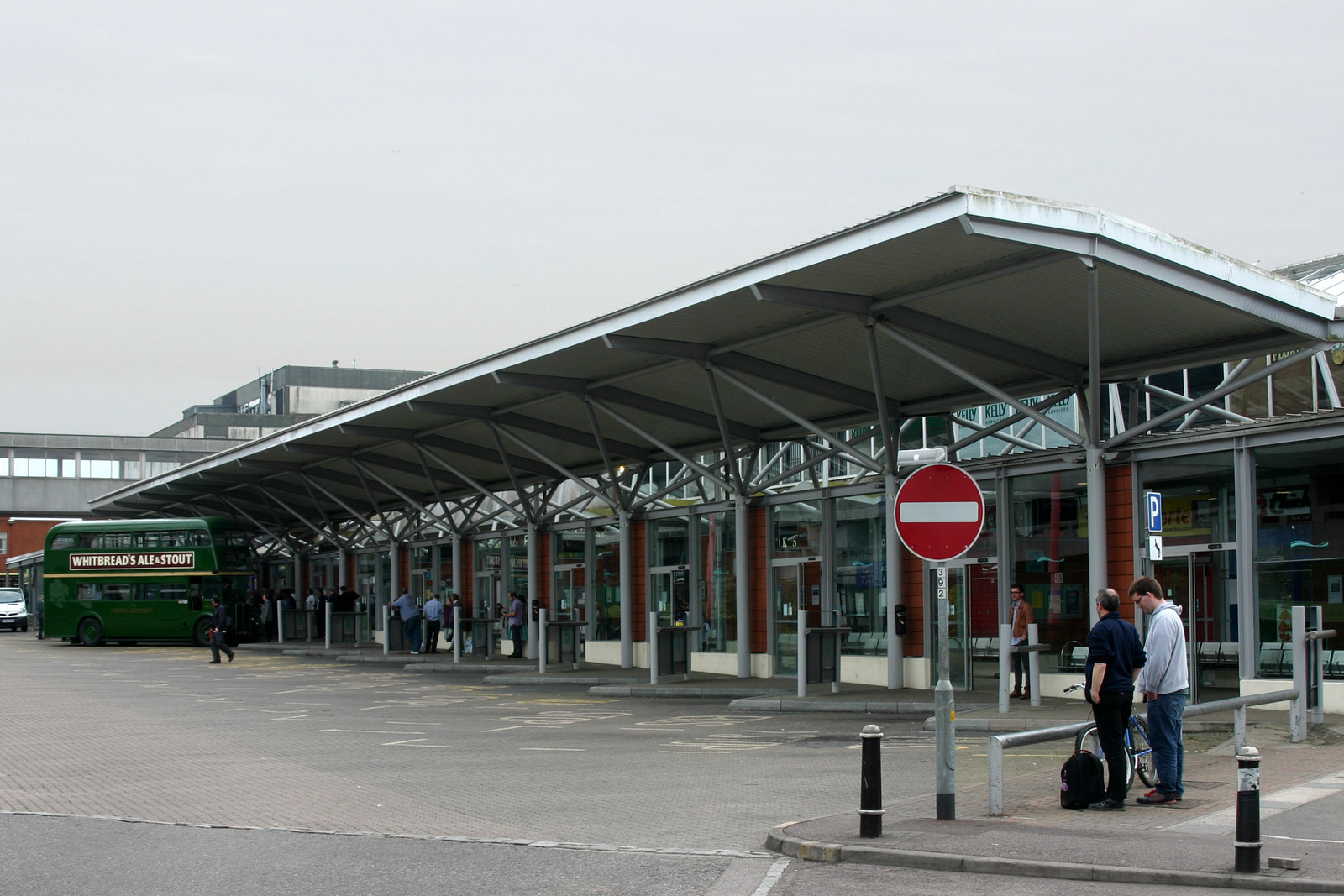
Harlow bus station

Harlow bus station provides a focal point for the town's extensive bus network and serves as a regional hub for the local area. The current site was constructed between 2001 and 2003, containing 15 stands and a small visitor information centre.

In July 2022, Harlow Council unveiled plans to completely rebuild the bus station at a cost of £15M, along with the construction of a brand new integrated transport and cycle hub. Planning permission for the project was granted in January 2023, with construction beginning in May 2024.

Arriva Herts & Essex operate a large number of local routes within the town. key destinations outside of Harlow include Bishop's Stortford, Stansted Airport and Chelmsford. Arriva also operate the Greenline 724 route, providing a service between Harlow and Heathrow Airport via Hertford and Watford.

Central Connect also operate several local services within Harlow, as well as connections to other nearby towns, such as Epping, Ongar, Cheshunt and Waltham Abbey. First Essex operate a small number of routes. There is also a National Express coach service between Stansted Airport and Oxford via Luton and Milton Keynes.

==== Harlow First Avenue Multi-Modal Corridor ====
Harlow First Avenue Multi-Modal Corridor
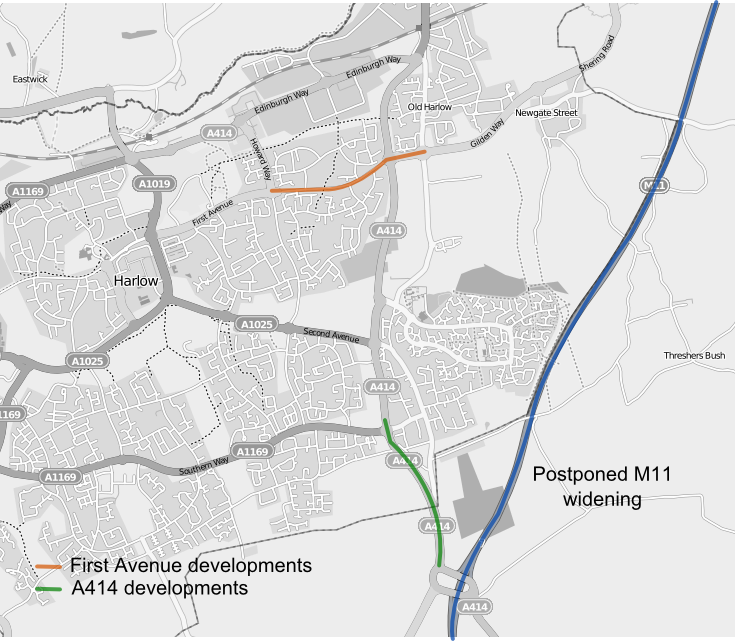
- Developments in and around Harlow.
- Location: Essex
- Proposer: Essex County Council
- Cost estimate: £4.4 million (2008)
- Completion date: February 2010
- Geometry: KML

Essex County Council was involved in development to Harlow's First Avenue, which was intended to reduce congestion and create better transport connections between the Newhall housing developments. The scheme was implemented in two phases, each phase focusing on developing First Avenue on either side of Howard Way. Phase two had an estimated cost of £4.4 million and was due to be completed in early 2010, phase one is already complete and is listed as having had £3.6 million of funding from the Community Infrastructure Fund (CIF). The scheme includes construction of a shared use cycleway and development to the bus service along First Avenue and into the Newhall development site where 'high quality bus' services between Harlow town centre and Harlow Town railway station are listed as part of the intentions of the development.

== Healthcare ==
Harlow is served by the NHS Princess Alexandra Hospital, situated on the edge of The High, which is the main Town Centre area of Harlow. This hospital has a 24-hour Accident & Emergency and Urgent Care Centre.

Plans for the hospital to be rebuilt were first put in place in 2019. In May 2023, it was announced that the facility would be rebuilt by 2030 as part of a £20bn pledge by the government. Following Labour's victory at the 2024 United Kingdom general election, these plans have currently been placed under review.

== Education ==
Harlow contains seven state-funded secondary schools:

- Stewards Academy
- Mark Hall Academy
- St Mark's West Essex Catholic School
- Burnt Mill Academy
- Passmores Academy
- Sir Frederick Gibberd College
- BMAT STEM Academy

St. Nicholas School is a private school in the town while Harlow College provides sixth form and further education. St Mark's West Essex Catholic School and BMAT STEM Academy also provide sixth form education.

Brays Grove Community School and Specialist Arts College closed down in June 2008 due to decreasing pupil numbers over a number of years. Following the schools closure, the site was demolished and redeveloped into a £23 million state of the art Academy which Passmores School and Technology College relocated to in September 2011 opening as Passmores Academy.

In the 1980s, a further two secondary schools were closed, Latton Bush (now a commercial centre and recreational centre) and Netteswell (now forms part of the Harlow College Campus) is a major further educational centre, covering GCSEs, A-Levels, and many vocational subjects including Hair and Beauty Therapy, Construction, Mechanics, ICT, and a new centre for engineering recently opened. The college is currently under major regeneration and is due to open a new university centre in partnership with Anglia Ruskin University, covering mostly Foundation degrees in a variety of subjects relevant to local employers' needs.

An international campus of Memorial University of Newfoundland is located in Old Harlow.

Passmores Academy was where the first school TV series, Educating Essex, was filmed. The episodes were broadcast from September to November 2011; they were produced in the 2010–2011 academic year.

=== Sir Frederick Gibberd College ===
Named after the prominent architect associated with Harlow, Sir Frederick Gibberd College opened in 2019. Built (to a design by HLM Architects) by Caledonian Modular from 198 prefabricated modules, the school was forced to close in August 2023 due to concerns about structural irregularities. The DfE blamed poor workmanship for the structural issues; the school had not been built in accordance with its original architectural design. HLM said the firm had raised concerns with Caledonian's approach to the technical delivery of the designs, both for Sir Frederick Gibberd College and for Haygrove School in Bridgwater; "Unable to resolve our differences, we parted company with Caledonian and the projects were delivered by others." In December 2023, the DfE confirmed that the college would be demolished and rebuilt.

== Sport and leisure ==
=== Cricket ===
Harlow Town Cricket Club was formed in 1960 as Stort Cricket Club and plays at Ash Tree Field. The club plays in division 2 of the Shepherd Neame Essex League, runs a junior section that play in the West Essex District Cricket Board League and has a girls team which play other girls teams in the county.

Harlow Town Cricket Club's Pavilion recently underwent a six figure refurbishment to promote women's and disabled cricket in Harlow and the whole of Essex. Essex County Cricket Club Ladies and disability sections use the club as well as the England disability teams.

Harlow has four cricket clubs. Harlow Cricket Club play in Division 3 of the Shepherd Neame Essex League and is based in Old Harlow. The club runs a junior section that play in the West Essex District Cricket Board League. Netteswell and Burnt Mill Cricket Club are based at Harlow Cricket Club, they are a social team that was founded around 1889. Near neighbours Potter Street and Church Langley Cricket Club play in the Herts and Essex League.

=== Football ===
The town's football club Harlow Town F.C. play in the Isthmian League South Central Division, having been relegated from the Premier Division in the 2018–19 season.

The club is best known for its extended run in the 1979-80 FA Cup, where they reached the Fourth Round of the competition. This included wins against established Football League sides Southend United and most famously a 1–0 win over Leicester City in a replay, having drawn 1–1 at Filbert Street. Harlow were eventually eliminated by Watford, narrowly losing 4–3.

The club built a new stadium in 2006 at Barrows Farm, now named The Harlow Arena, with the old Harlow Sports Centre being converted into housing.

Les Smith, a Harlow resident, represented Great Britain at the 1992 Barcelona Paralympic Games. Les became one of the first disabled people to become a qualified football coach in 1993.

=== Greyhound racing ===
The Harlow Greyhound Stadium has been at its present site for over 20 years and has regular race meetings each week as well as hosting other sporting events.

=== Rugby Union ===
Harlow Rugby Football Club moved from Ram Gorse near The Pinnacles to a new location in mid 2017 located on Howard Way, Latton Bush, Harlow. The former site of the club has been turned into a housing estate affectionately called Ram Gorse Park. The first team plays in the London and South East Division IIl North East league. Currently, the training grounds are located near Pennymead.

=== Other sports facilities ===
The town has a leisure facility named the Harlow Leisurezone, built in the late 2000s next to Harlow College as part of the Gateway Project, which replaced the old Harlow Sports Centre, opened in 1960.

In the 2010s, investments have included its skate-park next to Burnt Mill Academy. The project has been funded by the investment of over £300,000, largely from Harlow Council with £57,500 from Sport England. The park is floodlit. The 650sq metre park is made from concrete, and has a bowl as well as a street course which contains quarter pipes, flat banks, rails and steps.

== Art and culture ==
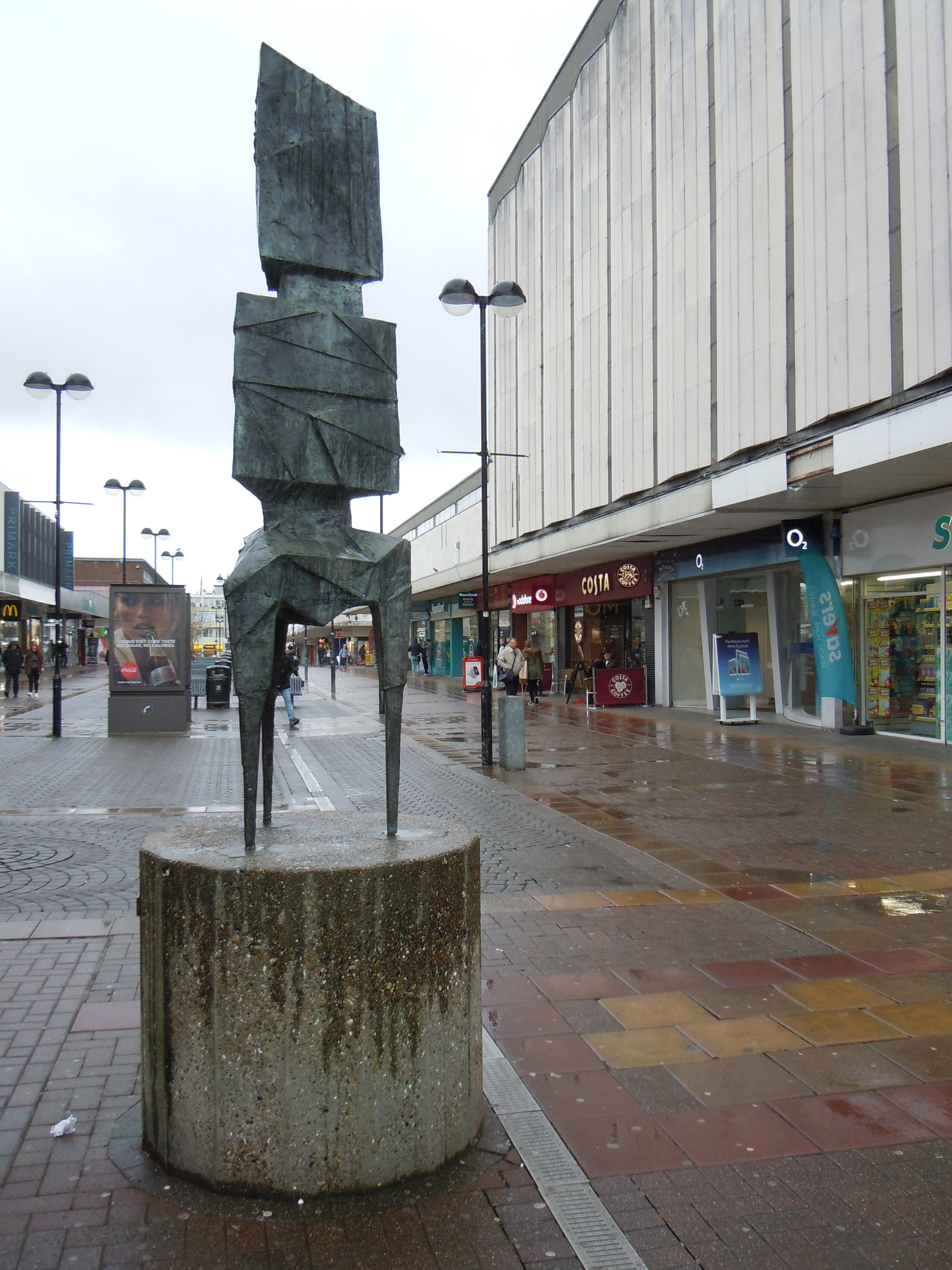
Trigon by Lynn Chadwick, in Harlow Town Centre

Harlow is the home to a major collection of public sculptures (over 100 in total) by artists such as Auguste Rodin, Henry Moore, Barbara Hepworth, Gerda Rubinstein and Ralph Brown. Many of these are owned by the Harlow Art Trust, an organisation set up in 1953 by the lead architect of Harlow Frederick Gibberd. Gibberd had idealistic notions of the New Town as a place where people who might not normally have access to art could enjoy great sculptures by great artists on every street corner. Consequently, almost all of Harlow's sculpture collection is in the open air, in shopping centres, housing estates and parks around the town.

In 2009, Harlow Council voted to celebrate Harlow's collection of sculpture by branding Harlow as 'Harlow Sculpture Town – The World's First Sculpture Town'. Harlow Sculpture Town began as an initiative from Harlow Art Trust, presenting itself as 'Sculpture Town', in a similar way to Hay-on-Wye's presentation of itself as Booktown.

As part of the 'Sculpture Town' branding, Harlow is also home to the Gibberd Garden, the former home of Frederick and Patricia Gibberd, which is a managed twentieth-century garden, and home to some of the Gibberd's private sculpture collection. The Gibberd Gallery, in the Civic Centre, contains a collection of twentieth-century watercolours and temporary exhibitions.

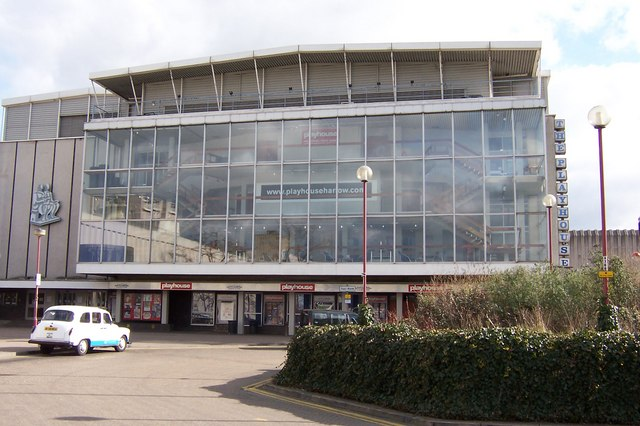
The Playhouse Theatre, shown in 2006

Harlow's Playhouse Theatre is in the town, which hosts shows and live comedy throughout the year and is the home to local community Arts group "Livewire Theatre" which has provided free arts access to young people since 2001.

Harlow has a local museum, which hold exhibitions and which contains artefacts on Harlow's historic past, charting the story of the town through the ages. Harlow Museum is in Muskham Road, and is set within the grounds of a sixteenth-century manor building with walled gardens. The museum is run in conjunction with the Essex Records Office (ERO) which holds family history archives in the search room. Admission to the museum is currently free, but visitors are encouraged to make a donation to ensure future maintenance of services.

The Town of Harlow and Harlow New Town are cited in the song "Get 'Em Out by Friday", by progressive rock group Genesis, on their 1972 album Foxtrot.

The album Pram Town, described as a "folk opera", is a concept album about Harlow by Darren Hayman and the Secondary Modern.

Harlow was home to The Square, named one of the Top 10 Small Venues in the UK by NME, but the venue was closed due to re-development of the site, and was demolished in 2018.

== Media ==
Harlow is within the BBC London and ITV London region. Television signals are received from Crystal Palace TV transmitter, BBC East and ITV Anglia can also be received from the Sandy Heath TV transmitter.

Local radio stations are BBC Essex on 95.3 FM, Heart East (formerly Ten-17) on 101.7 FM, and Harlow Hospital Radio which broadcast to hospital patients at the Princess Alexandra Hospital in the town.

Local newspapers are Harlow Guardian in print and Your Harlow that publishes online.

Channel 4's TV show of Educating Essex (2011) was filmed at Passmores Academy during the 2010/11 academic year.

== Twin towns ==
Harlow is twinned with:

- Havířov, Czech Republic
- Prague 15, Czech Republic
- Vélizy-Villacoublay, France
- Stavanger, Norway
- Tingalpa, Australia

== Arms ==
Coat of arms of Harlow District Council

Notes
Originally granted to Harlow Urban District Council on 27 September 1957.
Crest
On a wreath of the colours in front of a dexter cubit arm vested in a white shirtsleeve the cuff rolled back the hand grasping an axe a demi cogwheel all Proper.
Escutcheon
Vert between three lozenges Argent a pair of dividers Or enfiled by a mural crown also Argent two flaunches of the last each charged with a mascle Gules.
Motto
In Common Endeavour
