= Harlow Art Trust =

Harlow Art Trust (HAT) is a registered charity based in Harlow, Essex, established in the 1950s to acquire and display public sculpture. Set up by Frederick Gibberd, lead architect of Harlow New Town, the trust aims to make high-quality art accessible to all. Its collection is displayed in the town in open-air places such as shopping centres, housing estates, and parks.

== Notable sculptures ==
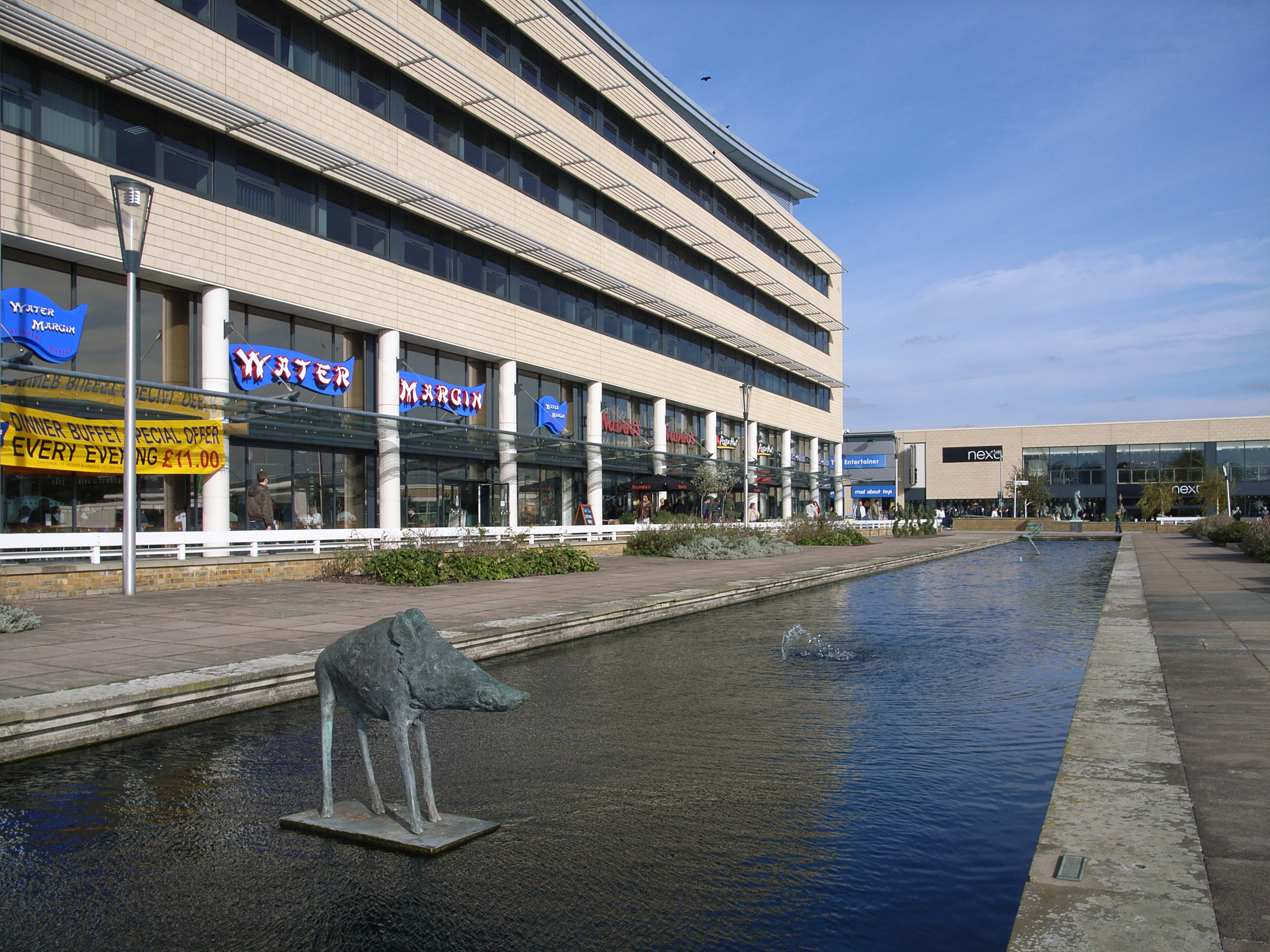
Boar by Elisabeth Frink

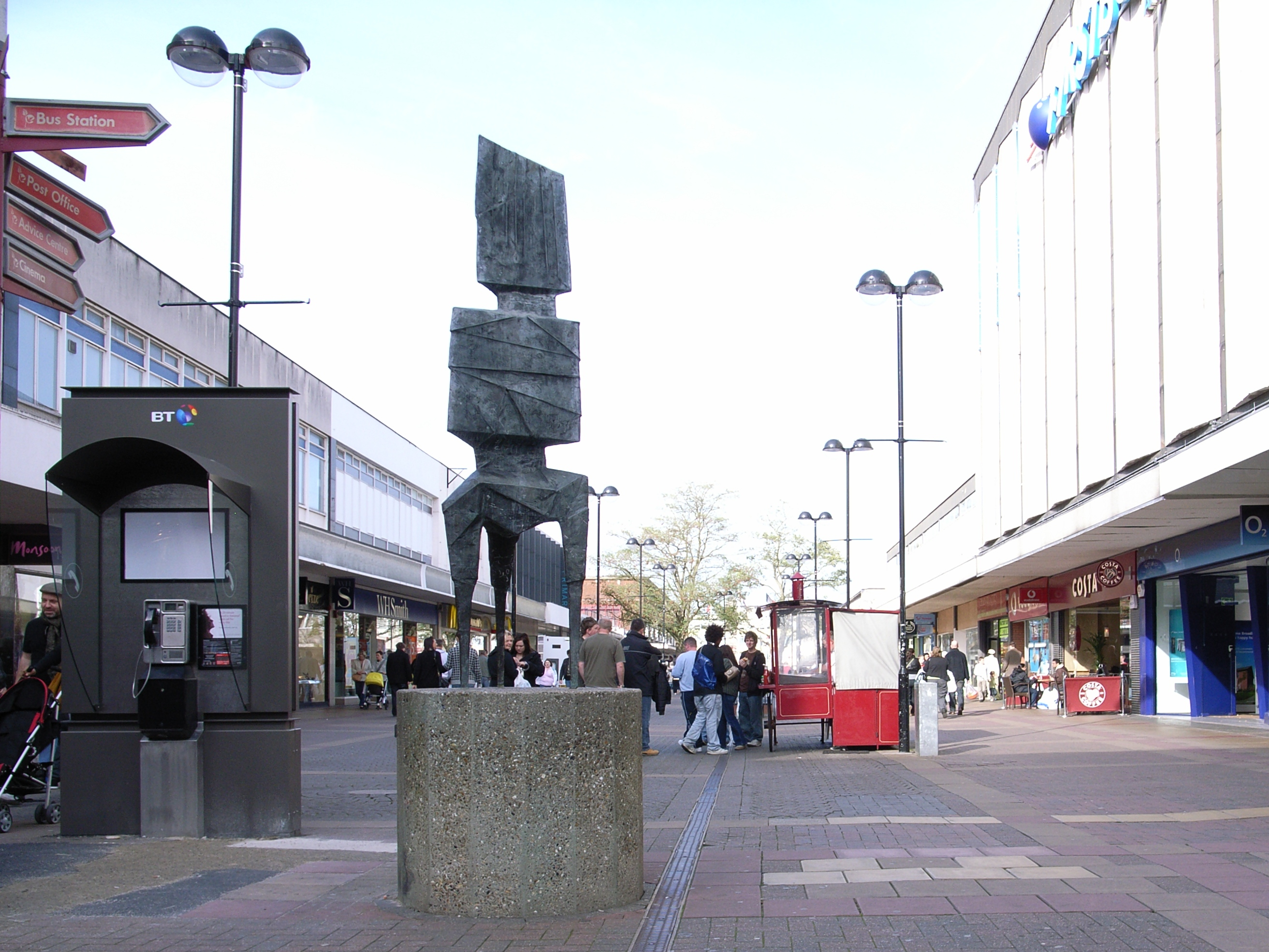
Trigon by Lynn Chadwick

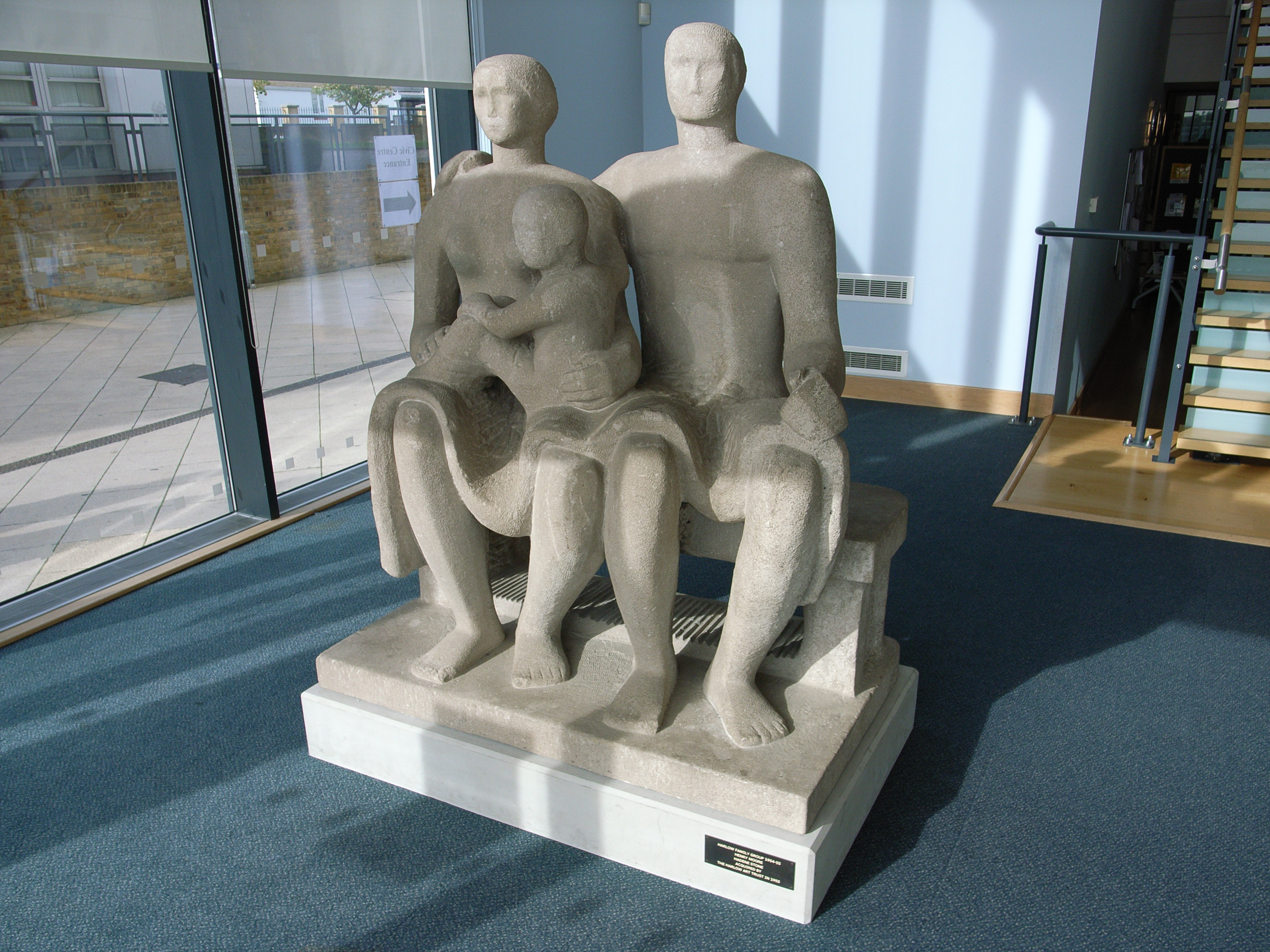
Family Group by Henry Moore

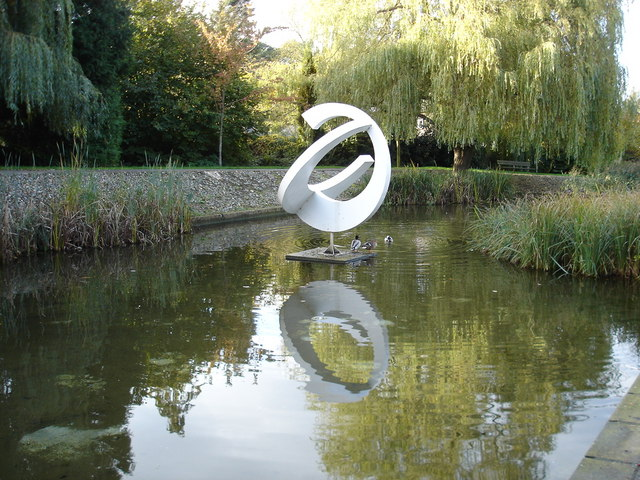
Pisces by Jessie Watkins

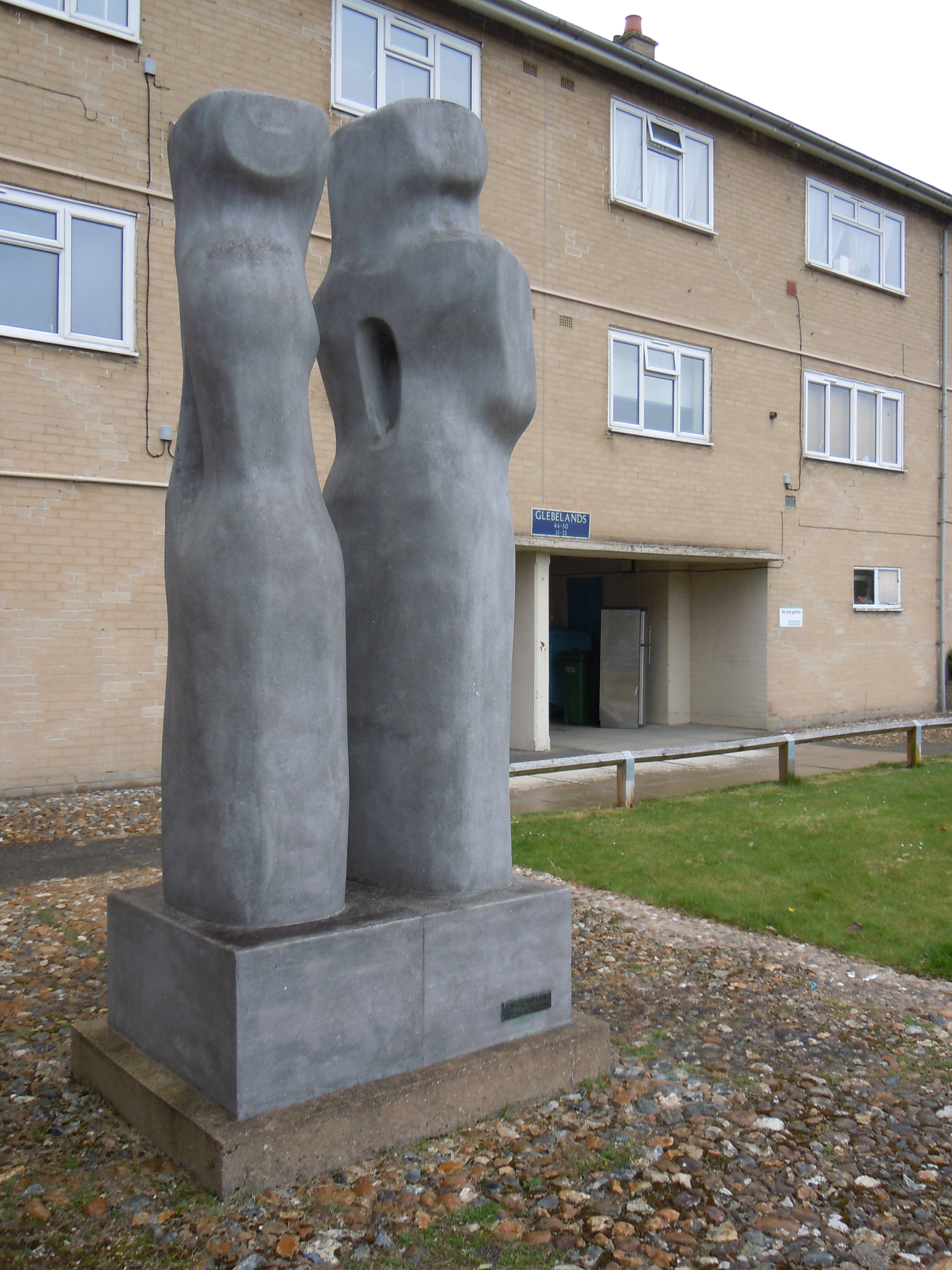
Contrapunctal Forms by Barbara Hepworth

Harlow Council has produced a 'Sculpture Trail' for visitors to the town which includes many of the sculptures held in the collection. These include:

- Henry Moore's Family Group (1954), which is in the foyer of the Civic Centre. When it was commissioned by the Harlow Art Trust it was one of Moore's first major public works.
- Elisabeth Frink's Boar, in the Water Gardens. Was originally commissioned in concrete (1957) but remade and cast in bronze in 1970.
- Lynn Chadwick Trigon (1961) - bought in 1963.
- Auguste Rodin - Eve (1882). Acquired from Musée Rodin in 1960. A companion piece to Adam, it was to be part of the sculptural project, The Gates of Hell, which remained unfinished at Rodin's death.
- Barbara Hepworth - Contrapunctal Forms (1951)
- Angela Godfrey - HAT has commissioned four sculptures by Godfrey: Grecian Urn: Two Vertical Forms (2000), We Are The Music Makers (2006), Flowing Onwards (2007), The Flame (2008)
- Sir Frederick Gibberd - Obelisk (1980).

== Sculpture Town ==
On 26 March 2009 Harlow Council voted to approve a proposal made by Harlow Art Trust to rebrand Harlow Town as 'Harlow Sculpture Town'. This is to highlight the collection of public sculptures cited around the town. The new title will be used on council and other tourist publications from the Summer of 2009 onwards, and aims to emulate the former name of Harlow (Harlow New Town). This celebrates the sculptures owned by Harlow Art Trust and other sculpture collections in Harlow, including those of the council, the Gibberd Garden and Parndon Mill. The aim of Harlow Art Trust is to associate Harlow with the name Sculpture Town as readily as the town of Hay-on-Wye is known as Booktown.

== Gibberd Gallery ==
The Harlow Art Trust also runs The Gibberd Gallery (named in honour of Sir Frederick Gibberd). The trust has run the Gibberd Gallery since 2011 after taking it over from Harlow Council. The gallery houses the town's sculpture and permanent watercolour collection. One of its previous trustees was the sculptor Angela Godfrey.

== See also ==
- List of public art in Harlow
