= Angela Godfrey =

English sculptor (born 1939)

- Born: 1939 (age 86–87); London, England
- Education: King's College, Newcastle upon Tyne
- Known for: Sculpture
- Spouse: Alan Burgess
- Website: angelagodfrey.co.uk

Angela Godfrey is an English sculptor and Member of the Royal Society of Sculptors.

== Personal life ==
Angela Godfrey was born in 1939 in London. She studied fine art at King's College, Newcastle upon Tyne from 1957 to 1961. She then taught at Mid-Warwickshire School of Art from 1962 to 1964. She is married to the artist and landscape painter Alan Burgess.

== Career and works ==
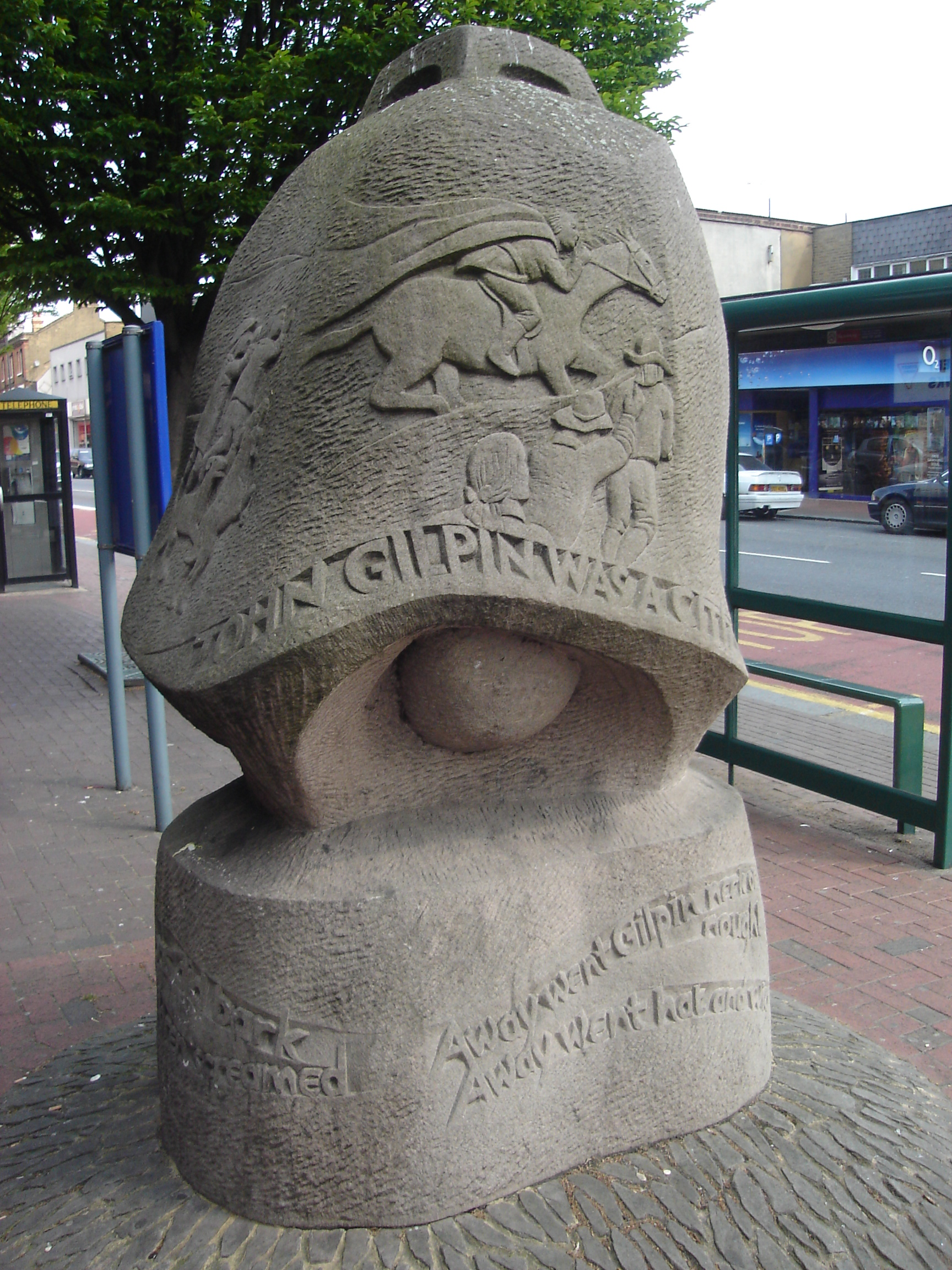
Gilpin's Bell, Edmonton by Angela Godfrey. The sculpture was inspired by William Cowper's 'The Diverting History of John Gilpin'.

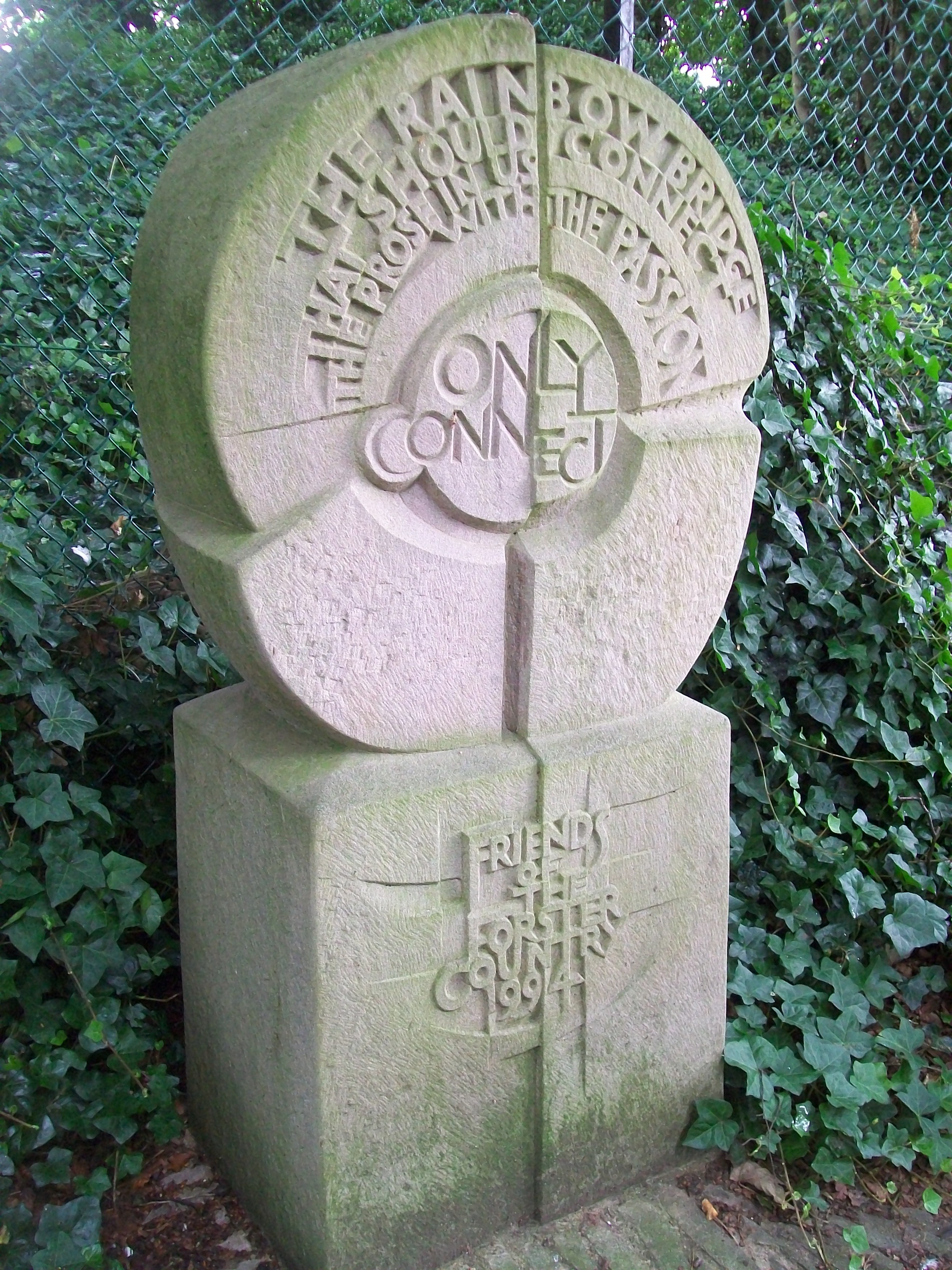
Only Connect Sculpture, St Nicholas' Churchyard, Stevenage (1994) - a monument to E.M. Forster

Godfrey's work often combines text with form. Her first commission after graduating was from the architect George Mathers, who asked her to make an altar for St Bartholomew's church in St Albans which he was designing. She has also collaborated with the architect Richard Hurley reordering churches in Hoddesdon, Harrow Weald, Ballyporeen in Co. Tipperary and Maidstone. She has won competitions for her work, including for a large street sculpture, Gilpin's Bell, in Fore Street, Edmonton, London (1994), for a Millennium sculpture for Stow-on-the-Wold, and for the River Stort sculpture trail. She is a Trustee of Harlow Art Trust (HAT) a registered charity founded in 1953. HAT commissions and cares for sculpture in Harlow and since 2011 runs the Gibberd Gallery. She was also the initiator and curator of the Playhouse Gallery, Harlow.

=== Works ===
- Altar and lectern (part of the 1991 reordering) for the Grade II listed Church of St Joseph, Wealdstone High Road, London.
- Statue for Grade II listed 3 East Street, Ware which was installed in 1986 and paid for by The Ware Society.
- Welded steel screen and font in Grade II listed Marychurch, Hatfield. A commission from George Mathers.
- The bishop's throne and Pascal candle for the rebuilt Longford Cathedral, Ireland.
- Only Connect sculpture in St Nicholas' churchyard, Stevenage (1994), which takes its name from the subtitle of E M Forster's Howards End and marks the gateway to 'Forster Country'.
- Four sculptures in Harlow - Grecian Urn, Two Vertical Forms (2000), The Flame (2008), We Are The Music Makers (2006), Flowing Onwards (2007).
- A carved pedestal of Bath stone with emblems representing the tree of life for the Church of St Mary, Finchley.
- A carved altar at St Peter ad Vincula, Roydon with symbols of the crucifixion and communion.
- Designs and carved stone for Blessed John Henry Newman Church, Warrington.
- A stainless steel dove for the Church of the Immaculate Heart of Mary, Carryduff. This is an unusual piece for Godfrey as she usually works in stone and wood.
- A concrete font for Church of St John Fisher, Redbourn, Herts (1966).
- "When the Wind is High..." an oak sculpture for Brixworth Country Park, Northamptonshire. Quotation from Mary Lockett.
- "No Man is an Island..." a Cumberland slate sculpture in Gibberd Garden, Harlow. Quotation from John Donne.

=== Exhibitions ===
Her work has been featured in a large number of exhibitions including:

- The University of Leicester's international sculpture exhibition 'A Decade of Sculpture in the Garden' (2011).
- 'Wood, Stone, Steel and Paint', The Gibberd Gallery, Harlow. A retrospective of her commissioned works, other sculptures and drawings.
- 'In Collaboration', an exhibition at The Gallery at Parndon Mill (2014). Featuring works made in collaboration with Eddie Norris.
