= Ralph Brown (sculptor) =

English sculptor

Ralph Brown, Meat Porters, 1959

Ralph Brown RA (1928 – 2013) was an English sculptor who came to national prominence in the late 1950s with his large-scale bronze Meat Porters, commissioned for Harlow New Town, Essex and is known for his sensual, figurative sculptures.

== Early career ==
Ralph Brown was born in Leeds, and is the younger contemporary of the eminent group of Yorkshire sculptors that include Barbara Hepworth, Henry Moore and Kenneth Armitage. Between 1948 and 1951 he studied at Leeds College of Art, where both Moore and Hepworth attended. He then spent a year at Hammersmith School of Art before entering the Royal College of Art in 1952 where he was taught by Frank Dobson, John Skeaping and Leon Underwood. He won a number of scholarships including a stay in Paris to work in the studio of Ossip Zadkine where he also studied work by Auguste Rodin and metGermain Richier and Giacometti. In 1957 he won the Boise Scholarship to Italy where he was inspired by Marino Marini, Giacomo Manzu and Medardo Rosso. Brown also worked in Cannes making mosaics for Pablo Picasso

== Style and technique ==
Like Henry Moore who befriended him and encouraged him by buying his work, Brown's art is deeply rooted in the figurative tradition. However, whilst his predecessors focused their energies on carving and maintaining 'truth to materials', Brown concentrated on modelling allowing him to interact with his material on a more intimate level. In the introductory catalogue essay for Brown's major retrospective show at Leeds City Art Gallery in 1988 Dennis Farr commented: "So much of Brown's sculpture is his search for equivalents, in formal terms, for sensual experiences."

== Harlow New Town Commission ==
Brown came to national prominence in the late 1950s with his large-scale bronze group Meat Porters, commissioned for Harlow New Town, Essex. The piece is a tribute to physical labour with two figures hauling an ox carcass, a subject fitting to the busy market square and a form that brings dynamism to the otherwise rigid architecture. The concrete version of the piece won second prize for sculpture at the John Moore's Exhibition, Liverpool in 1959.

== Recognition ==
During the 1950s Brown's work attracted much critical acclaim and was shown alongside his contemporaries Kenneth Armitage, William Turnbull and Eduardo Paolozzi. Brown was elected a Royal Academician in 1972 and his work can be found in many prestigious public collections including the Tate Collection, Arts Council of Great Britain, Leeds City Art Gallery and many other public collections in Britain and overseas. Brown had a major retrospective at Leeds City Art Gallery in 1988.

== Public collections ==
- Aberdeen Art Gallery, Scotland
- Albright-Knox Collection, Buffalo, USA
- Arts Council of Great Britain
- Atkinson Art Gallery, Hull. UK
- Cass Foundation, Sculpture at Goodwood, UK
- Chantrey Bequest Collection, UK
- City of Bristol Museum and Art Gallery, UK
- Contemporary Art Society, London
- Doncaster Museum and Art Gallery UK
- Halifax Art Gallery, UK
- Hepworth Wakefield Gallery, UK
- Huddersfield Art Gallery, UK
- The Ingram Collection UK
- Laing Art Gallery, Newcastle on Tyne. UK
- Leeds City Galleries, UK
- Manchester City Art Gallery, UK
- National Museum of Wales, Cardiff
- Norfolk Contemporary Art Society, UK
- Norwich Castle Museum & Art Gallery. UK
- Rijksmuseum Kroller-Muller, Netherlands
- Royal Academy of Arts, London
- Royal College of Art, London
- Royal West of England Academy, Bristol UK
- Salzburg State Museum, Austria
- Southport Art Gallery, UK
- Stuyvesant Foundation, RSA
- Tate Britain.
- University of Liverpool, UK
- West Riding Education Committee UK

== Public sculpture ==
- Meat Porters (1959–60). Sited in the Market Square at Harlow New Town, Essex in 1961
- Sheep Shearer 1953 sited in Harlow New Town, Essex in 1957
- Swimming Market Place Fountain, Hatfield New Town, now re-sited in front of the Sports Centre, 1962
- Liverpool University, Engineering Block. Relief purchased by Eugene Rosenberg with FRS Yorke and CS Mardall, 1966
- Man and Child 1963 sited by Admin Block, Loughborough University
- The Patriarch. Jambo 1995 Commissioned by Durrell Wildlife Conservation Trust for Jersey Zoo as a memorial to the famous gorilla.

== Solo exhibitions ==
- 2016, Ralph Brown & the Figure in the Fifties and Sixties. Pangolin London
- 2015, Ralph Brown, Nine Sculptures. 108 Fine Art, Harrogate, Yorkshire
- 2014, Ralph Brown RA: A Memorial Exhibition, Pangolin London
- 2009, Ralph Brown at Eighty: The Early Decades Revisited, Pangolin London
- 2005, Number Nine Gallery, Birmingham
- 1999, Bruton Gallery, Leeds
- 1996, Alpha House Gallery, Sherborne, Dorset
- 1995, Napier Gallery, St Helier, Jersey
- 1988, Leeds City Art Gallery/Henry Moore Institute
- 1988, Mead Gallery, University of Warwick Arts Centre
- 1987, Eton Art Gallery, Windsor
- 1987, Beaux Arts Bath
- 1986, Solomon Gallery, London
- 1985, Long Island Gallery, New York
- 1984, Charles Foley Gallery, Columbus, Ohio
- 1983, Beaux Arts, Bath
- 1983, Puck Building, New York City
- 1979, Browse and Darby, London
- 1976, Robert Welch Gallery, Chipping Campden
- 1976, Taranman Gallery, London
- 1975, Galerie H, Marseille
- 1974, Galerie Dortindeguey, Montpellier
- 1973, Gunther Franke, Munich (Drawings)
- 1972, Archer Gallery, London
- 1972, Traklhaus Galerie, Salzburg Festival
- 1971, Form International, London
- 1964, Bangor University, Wales
- 1964, Forum Gallery, Bristol
- 1963, Leicester Galleries, London
- 1961, Leicester Galleries, London

== Publications ==
- 'Whiteley, Gillian; Wood, Jon; Kingdon, Rungwe; Le Carré, John (2009). Social, savage, sensual: the sculpture of Ralph Brown'. Sansom & Company. ISBN 978-1-904537-95-3.
- 'Ralph Brown at Eighty. Early Decades Revisited. London: Pangolin. 2009. ISBN 978-0-9560491-2-4.
- Ralph Brown, Sculpture. epe books. 2000. ISBN 0-9533979-0-4.
- 'Farr, Dennis; Walton, Ruth (1988). Ralph Brown. Sculpture and Drawings. Leeds City Art Gallery. ISBN 0901981389.
