= Gibberd Garden =

The Gibberd Garden
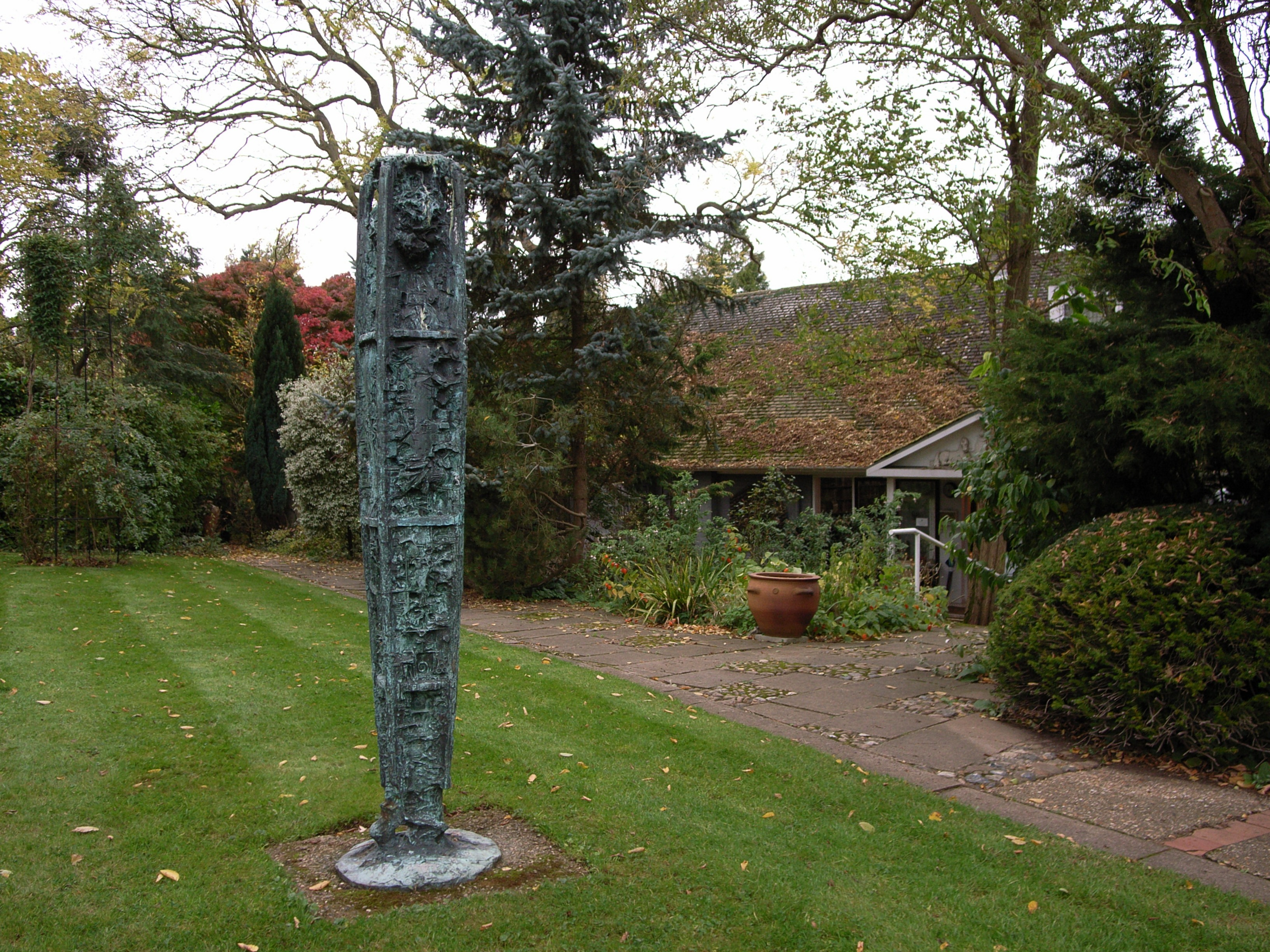
- Interactive map of The Gibberd Garden
- Location: Harlow
- OS grid: TL48368-12519
- Coordinates: 51.791698°N 0.149874°E
- Operator: Gibberd Garden Trust
- Status: Afternoon opening three days a week from 3 April to 29 September
- Website: http://www.thegibberdgarden.co.uk/

Gibberd Garden is a garden in Harlow, Essex, England, which was created by Sir Frederick Gibberd (the planner of Harlow New Town) and his wife Patricia Gibberd. They designed the garden and added sculptures, ceramic pots, and architectural salvage from 1972 till his death in 1984.
