= 1999 United Kingdom local elections =

- 6 May 1999

All 36 metropolitan boroughs, 35 out of 46 unitary authorities, 237 out of 238 English districts, all 32 Scottish council areas and all 22 Welsh principal areas
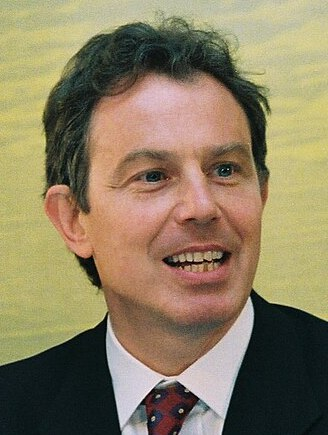

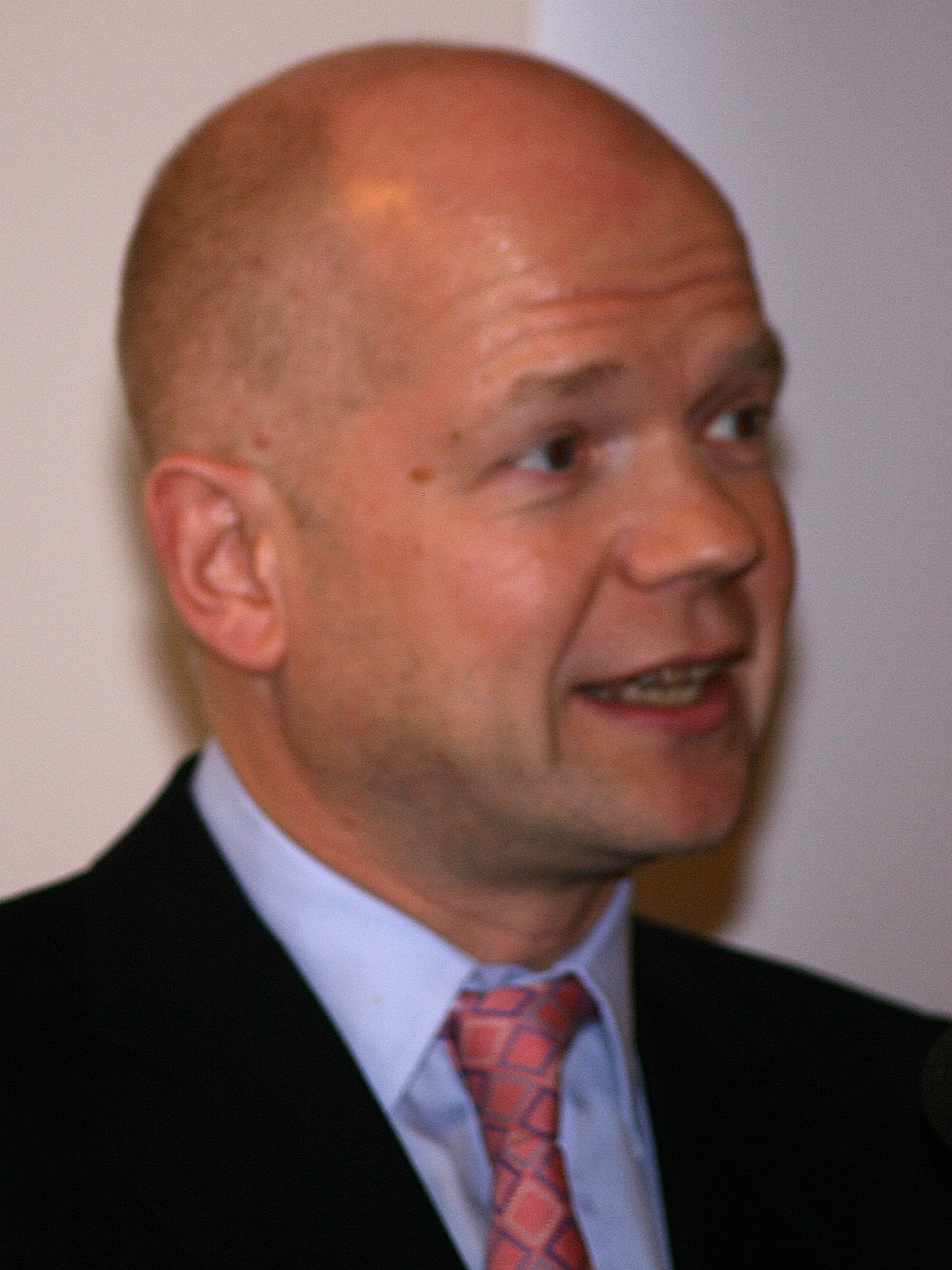

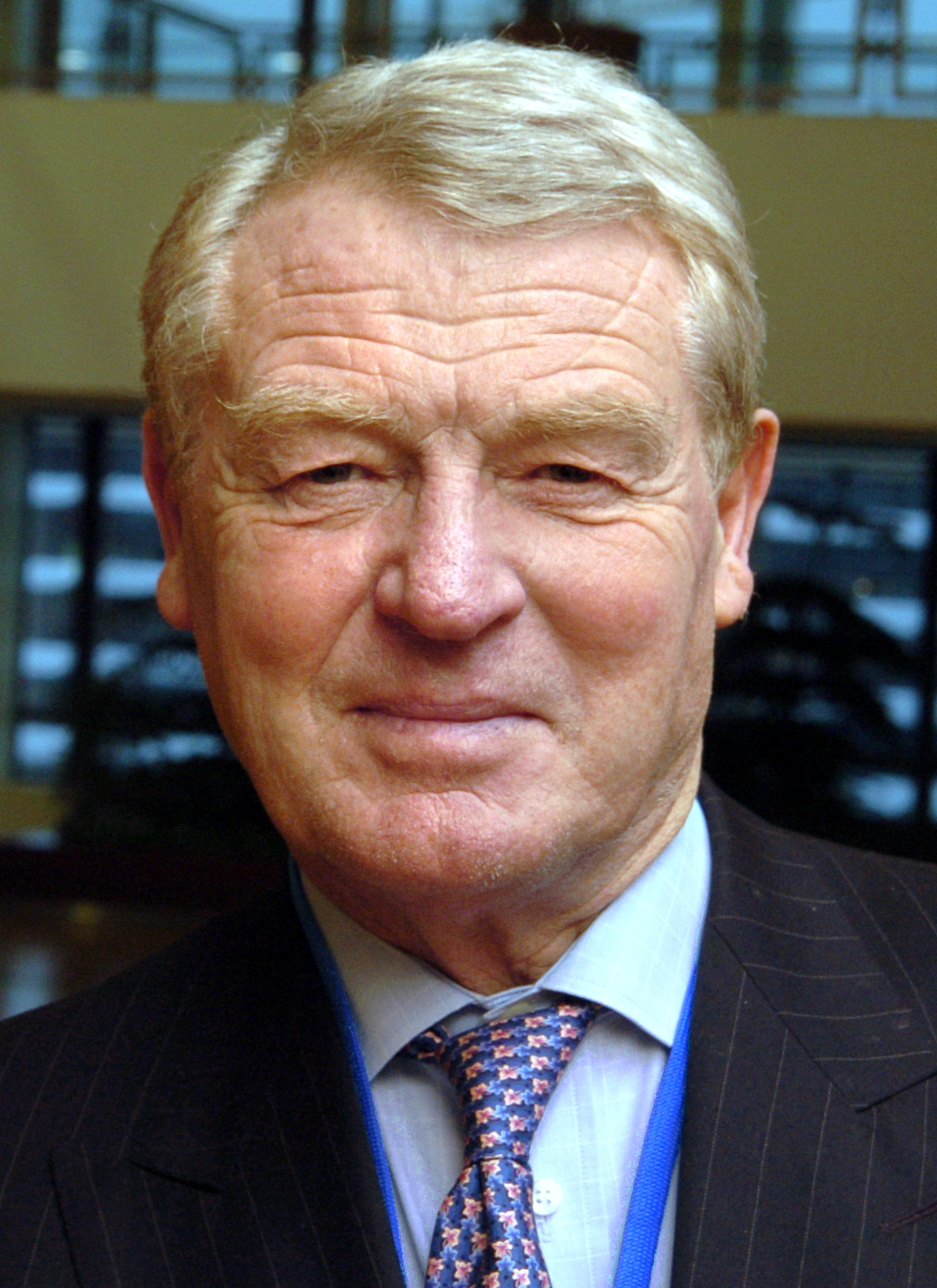
	Majority party	Minority party	Third party
Leader	Tony Blair	William Hague	Paddy Ashdown
Party	Labour	Conservative	Liberal Democrats
Leader since	21 July 1994	19 June 1997	16 July 1988
Percentage	36%	34%	24%
Swing	▼2%	▲2%	▼1%
Councils	137	61	20
Councils +/-	▼32	▲48	▼11
Councillors	4,802	3,766	2,609
Councillors +/-	▼1,150	▲1,348	▼90
- Colours denote the winning party, as shown in the main table of results.

The 1999 United Kingdom local elections were held on Thursday 6 May 1999. All Scottish and Welsh unitary authorities had all their seats elected. In England a third of the seats on each of the metropolitan boroughs were elected along with elections in many of the unitary authorities and district councils. There were no local elections in Northern Ireland.

The elections saw Labour, now in their second year of government, suffer a setback as the opposition Conservatives gained ground. The councils up for election had last been contested in 1995, which saw Labour achieve record gains and the Conservatives lose over 2,000 seats.

== Results ==
Party	Councils				Councillors			
Party	Gain	Loss	Change	Total	Gain	Loss	Change	Total
Labour	3	35	▼–32	137	89	1,239	▼–1,150	4,802
Conservative	48	0	▲+48	61	1,391	43	▲+1,348	3,766
Liberal Democrats	7	18	▼-11	20	383	473	▼-90	2,609
SNP	0	1	▼-1	1	41	24	▲+17	208
Plaid Cymru	2	0	▲+2	3	89	7	▲+81	205
Independent	2	5	▼-3	18	174	299	▼-125	1,551
Other	0	0	0	0	66	145	▼–79	191
No overall control	40	42	▼-2	122	—	—	—	—

== England ==
=== Metropolitan boroughs ===
All 36 English Metropolitan borough councils had one third of their seats up for election.

Council	Previous control	Result	Details
Barnsley	Labour	Labour hold	Details
Birmingham	Labour	Labour hold	Details
Bolton	Labour	Labour hold	Details
Bradford	Labour	Labour hold	Details
Bury	Labour	Labour hold	Details
Calderdale	No overall control	No overall control hold	Details
Coventry	Labour	Labour hold	Details
Doncaster	Labour	Labour hold	Details
Dudley	Labour	Labour hold	Details
Gateshead	Labour	Labour hold	Details
Kirklees	Labour	No overall control gain	Details
Knowsley	Labour	Labour hold	Details
Leeds	Labour	Labour hold	Details
Liverpool	Liberal Democrats	Liberal Democrats hold	Details
Manchester	Labour	Labour hold	Details
Newcastle upon Tyne	Labour	Labour hold	Details
North Tyneside	Labour	Labour hold	Details
Oldham	Labour	Labour hold	Details
Rochdale	Labour	Labour hold	Details
Rotherham	Labour	Labour hold	Details
Salford	Labour	Labour hold	Details
Sandwell	Labour	Labour hold	Details
Sefton	No overall control	No overall control hold	Details
Sheffield	Labour	Liberal Democrats gain	Details
Solihull	No overall control	No overall control hold	Details
South Tyneside	Labour	Labour hold	Details
St Helens	Labour	Labour hold	Details
Stockport	No overall control	Liberal Democrats gain	Details
Sunderland	Labour	Labour hold	Details
Tameside	Labour	Labour hold	Details
Trafford	Labour	Labour hold	Details
Wakefield	Labour	Labour hold	Details
Walsall	No overall control	Labour gain	Details
Wigan	Labour	Labour hold	Details
Wirral	Labour	Labour hold	Details
Wolverhampton	Labour	Labour hold	Details

=== Unitary authorities ===
==== Whole council ====
Council	Previous control	Result	Details
Bath and North East Somerset ‡	No overall control	No overall control hold	Details
Brighton and Hove	Labour	Labour hold	Details
Bristol ‡	Labour	Labour hold	Details
Bournemouth	No overall control	No overall control hold	Details
Darlington	Labour	Labour hold	Details
East Riding of Yorkshire	No overall control	No overall control hold	Details
Leicester	Labour	Labour hold	Details
Luton	Labour	Labour hold	Details
Middlesbrough	Labour	Labour hold	Details
Milton Keynes	Labour	Labour hold	Details
North East Lincolnshire	Labour	Labour hold	Details
North Lincolnshire	Labour	Labour hold	Details
North Somerset ‡	No overall control	Conservative gain	Details
Poole	Liberal Democrats	No overall control gain	Details
Redcar and Cleveland	Labour	Labour hold	Details
Rutland	No overall control	No overall control hold	Details
South Gloucestershire ‡	No overall control	Liberal Democrats gain	Details
Stockton-on-Tees	Labour	Labour hold	Details

‡ New ward boundaries

==== Third of council ====
Council	Previous control	Result	Details
Blackburn with Darwen	Labour	Labour hold	Details
Derby	Labour	Labour hold	Details
Halton	Labour	Labour hold	Details
Hartlepool	Labour	Labour hold	Details
Kingston upon Hull	Labour	Labour hold	Details
Peterborough	No overall control	No overall control hold	Details
Portsmouth	Labour	Labour hold	Details
Reading	Labour	Labour hold	Details
Slough	Labour	Labour hold	Details
Southampton	Labour	Labour hold	Details
Southend-on-Sea	No overall control	No overall control hold	Details
Stoke-on-Trent	Labour	Labour hold	Details
Swindon	Labour	Labour hold	Details
Thurrock	Labour	Labour hold	Details
Warrington	Labour	Labour hold	Details
Wokingham	Conservative	Conservative hold	Details
York	Labour	Labour hold	Details

=== District councils ===
==== Whole council ====
Council	Previous control	Result	Details
Allerdale ‡	Labour	Labour hold	Details
Alnwick ‡	No overall control	No overall control hold	Details
Arun	Conservative	Conservative hold	Details
Ashfield	Labour	Labour hold	Details
Ashford	No overall control	No overall control hold	Details
Aylesbury Vale	Liberal Democrats	No overall control gain	Details
Babergh	No overall control	No overall control hold	Details
Barrow-in-Furness ‡	Labour	No overall control gain	Details
Berwick-upon-Tweed ‡	No overall control	Liberal Democrats gain	Details
Blaby	No overall control	Conservative gain	Details
Blyth Valley ‡	Labour	Labour hold	Details
Bolsover	Labour	Labour hold	Details
Boston ‡	No overall control	No overall control hold	Details
Braintree	Labour	Labour hold	Details
Breckland	No overall control	Conservative gain	Details
Bridgnorth	Independent	Independent hold	Details
Bromsgrove	Labour	Conservative gain	Details
Broxbourne ‡	Conservative	Conservative hold	Details
Broxtowe	Labour	Labour hold	Details
Canterbury	No overall control	No overall control hold	Details
Caradon	No overall control	No overall control hold	Details
Carlisle ‡	Labour	Conservative gain	Details
Carrick	No overall control	Liberal Democrats gain	Details
Castle Morpeth ‡	No overall control	No overall control hold	Details
Castle Point	Labour	Labour hold	Details
Charnwood	Labour	No overall control gain	Details
Chelmsford	Liberal Democrats	No overall control gain	Details
Chesterfield	Labour	Labour hold	Details
Chester-le-Street	Labour	Labour hold	Details
Chester ‡	No overall control	No overall control hold	Details
Chichester	No overall control	Conservative gain	Details
Chiltern	No overall control	Conservative gain	Details
Christchurch	No overall control	Conservative gain	Details
Congleton ‡	Liberal Democrats	Liberal Democrats hold	Details
Copeland ‡	Labour	Labour hold	Details
Corby ‡	Labour	Labour hold	Details
Cotswold	Independent	No overall control gain	Details
Crewe and Nantwich ‡	Labour	Labour hold	Details
Dacorum ‡	No overall control	Conservative gain	Details
Dartford	Labour	Labour hold	Details
Daventry ‡	No overall control	Conservative gain	Details
Derbyshire Dales	No overall control	Conservative gain	Details
Derwentside	Labour	Labour hold	Details
Dover	Labour	No overall control gain	Details
Durham	Labour	Labour hold	Details
Easington	Labour	Labour hold	Details
East Cambridgeshire	Independent	Liberal Democrats gain	Details
East Devon	Conservative	Conservative hold	Details
East Dorset	Liberal Democrats	Conservative gain	Details
East Hampshire	Liberal Democrats	Conservative gain	Details
East Hertfordshire ‡	No overall control	Conservative gain	Details
East Lindsey ‡	Independent	Independent hold	Details
East Northamptonshire ‡	Labour	Conservative gain	Details
East Staffordshire	Labour	Labour hold	Details
Eden ‡	Independent	Independent hold	Details
Ellesmere Port and Neston ‡	Labour	Labour hold	Details
Epsom and Ewell	Independent	Independent hold	Details
Erewash	Labour	Labour hold	Details
Fenland	No overall control	Conservative gain	Details
Forest Heath	No overall control	Conservative gain	Details
Forest of Dean ‡	Labour	Labour hold	Details
Fylde	No overall control	No overall control hold	Details
Gedling	Labour	Conservative gain	Details
Gravesham	Labour	Labour hold	Details
Guildford	No overall control	No overall control hold	Details
Hambleton	Conservative	Conservative hold	Details
Harborough	No overall control	No overall control hold	Details
Hertsmere ‡	Labour	Conservative gain	Details
High Peak	Labour	Labour hold	Details
Hinckley and Bosworth	No overall control	No overall control hold	Details
Horsham	Liberal Democrats	Conservative gain	Details
Kennet	No overall control	No overall control hold	Details
Kerrier	No overall control	No overall control hold	Details
Kettering ‡	Labour	No overall control gain	Details
King's Lynn and West Norfolk	Labour	No overall control gain	Details
Lancaster	Labour	No overall control gain	Details
Lewes	Liberal Democrats	Liberal Democrats hold	Details
Lichfield	Labour	Conservative gain	Details
Lincoln ‡	Labour	Labour hold	Details
Macclesfield ‡	Conservative	Conservative hold	Details
Maldon	No overall control	Conservative gain	Details
Mansfield	Labour	Labour hold	Details
Melton	No overall control	No overall control hold	Details
Mendip ‡	No overall control	No overall control hold	Details
Mid Bedfordshire	No overall control	Conservative gain	Details
Mid Devon	No overall control	No overall control hold	Details
Mid Suffolk	No overall control	No overall control hold	Details
Mid Sussex	No overall control	Conservative gain	Details
New Forest	Liberal Democrats	Conservative gain	Details
Newark and Sherwood	Labour	No overall control gain	Details
North Cornwall	Independent	Independent hold	Details
North Devon	Liberal Democrats	Liberal Democrats hold	Details
North Dorset	Liberal Democrats	No overall control gain	Details
North East Derbyshire	Labour	Labour hold	Details
North Hertfordshire ‡	Labour	Conservative gain	Details
North Kesteven ‡	No overall control	No overall control hold	Details
North Norfolk	No overall control	No overall control hold	Details
North Shropshire	Independent	Independent hold	Details
North Warwickshire	Labour	Labour hold	Details
North West Leicestershire	Labour	Labour hold	Details
North Wiltshire	Liberal Democrats	No overall control gain	Details
Northampton ‡	Labour	Labour hold	Details
Oadby and Wigston	Liberal Democrats	Liberal Democrats hold	Details
Oswestry	No overall control	Independent gain	Details
Purbeck ‡	No overall control	Conservative gain	Details
Restormel	Liberal Democrats	No overall control gain	Details
Ribble Valley	No overall control	No overall control hold	Details
Richmondshire	Independent	No overall control gain	Details
Rother	No overall control	Conservative gain	Details
Rushcliffe	No overall control	Conservative gain	Details
Ryedale	No overall control	No overall control hold	Details
Salisbury	No overall control	No overall control hold	Details
Scarborough	No overall control	No overall control hold	Details
Sedgefield	Labour	Labour hold	Details
Sedgemoor ‡	No overall control	Conservative gain	Details
Selby	Labour	No overall control gain	Details
Sevenoaks	No overall control	Conservative gain	Details
Shepway	No overall control	Conservative gain	Details
South Bucks	No overall control	Conservative gain	Details
South Derbyshire	Labour	Labour hold	Details
South Hams ‡	No overall control	Conservative gain	Details
South Holland ‡	Independent	Conservative gain	Details
South Kesteven ‡	No overall control	No overall control hold	Details
South Lakeland ‡	No overall control	No overall control hold	Details
South Norfolk	Liberal Democrats	Liberal Democrats hold	Details
South Northamptonshire ‡	No overall control	Conservative gain	Details
South Oxfordshire	No overall control	No overall control hold	Details
South Ribble	No overall control	No overall control hold	Details
South Shropshire	Independent	Independent hold	Details
South Somerset ‡	Liberal Democrats	Liberal Democrats hold	Details
South Staffordshire	Conservative	Conservative hold	Details
Spelthorne	Conservative	Conservative hold	Details
St Albans ‡	Liberal Democrats	No overall control gain	Details
St Edmundsbury	No overall control	Conservative gain	Details
Stafford	Labour	No overall control gain	Details
Staffordshire Moorlands	No overall control	No overall control hold	Details
Stevenage ‡	Labour	Labour hold	Details
Suffolk Coastal	No overall control	Conservative gain	Details
Surrey Heath	Conservative	Conservative hold	Details
Taunton Deane ‡	Liberal Democrats	No overall control gain	Details
Teesdale	Independent	Independent hold	Details
Teignbridge	No overall control	No overall control hold	Details
Tendring	Labour	No overall control gain	Details
Test Valley	No overall control	Conservative gain	Details
Tewkesbury	No overall control	No overall control hold	Details
Thanet	Labour	Labour hold	Details
Three Rivers ‡	No overall control	Liberal Democrats gain	Details
Tonbridge and Malling	No overall control	No overall control hold	Details
Torridge	No overall control	Independent gain	Details
Tynedale ‡	No overall control	No overall control hold	Details
Uttlesford	No overall control	No overall control hold	Details
Vale of White Horse	Liberal Democrats	Liberal Democrats hold	Details
Vale Royal ‡	Labour	Labour hold	Details
Wansbeck ‡	Labour	Labour hold	Details
Warwick	No overall control	No overall control hold	Details
Watford ‡	Labour	Labour hold	Details
Waverley	Liberal Democrats	Conservative gain	Details
Wealden	Conservative	Conservative hold	Details
Wear Valley	Labour	Labour hold	Details
Wellingborough ‡	No overall control	Labour gain	Details
Welwyn Hatfield ‡	Labour	Conservative gain	Details
West Devon	No overall control	No overall control hold	Details
West Dorset	No overall control	No overall control hold	Details
West Lindsey ‡	No overall control	No overall control hold	Details
West Somerset ‡	No overall control	No overall control hold	Details
West Wiltshire	Liberal Democrats	Liberal Democrats hold	Details
Wychavon	No overall control	Conservative gain	Details
Wycombe	No overall control	Conservative gain	Details
Wyre	Labour	Conservative gain	Details

‡ New ward boundaries

==== Third of council ====
Council	Previous control	Result	Details
Adur	Liberal Democrats	No overall control gain	Details
Amber Valley	Labour	Labour hold	Details
Basildon	Labour	Labour hold	Details
Basingstoke and Deane	No overall control	No overall control hold	Details
Bassetlaw	Labour	Labour hold	Details
Bedford	No overall control	No overall control hold	Details
Brentwood	Liberal Democrats	Liberal Democrats hold	Details
Broadland	No overall control	Conservative gain	Details
Burnley	Labour	Labour hold	Details
Cambridge	No overall control	No overall control hold	Details
Cannock Chase	Labour	Labour hold	Details
Cheltenham	Liberal Democrats	No overall control gain	Details
Cherwell	No overall control	No overall control hold	Details
Chorley	Labour	Labour hold	Details
Colchester	No overall control	No overall control hold	Details
Craven	No overall control	Conservative gain	Details
Crawley	Labour	Labour hold	Details
Eastbourne	Liberal Democrats	No overall control gain	Details
Eastleigh	Liberal Democrats	Liberal Democrats hold	Details
Elmbridge	No overall control	No overall control hold	Details
Epping Forest	No overall control	No overall control hold	Details
Exeter	Labour	Labour hold	Details
Fareham	No overall control	Conservative gain	Details
Gloucester	Labour	Labour hold	Details
Gosport	No overall control	No overall control hold	Details
Great Yarmouth	Labour	Labour hold	Details
Harlow	Labour	Labour hold	Details
Harrogate	Liberal Democrats	Liberal Democrats hold	Details
Hart	No overall control	No overall control hold	Details
Hastings	Labour	Labour hold	Details
Havant	No overall control	No overall control hold	Details
Huntingdonshire	Conservative	Conservative hold	Details
Hyndburn	Labour	No overall control gain	Details
Ipswich	Labour	Labour hold	Details
Maidstone	No overall control	No overall control hold	Details
Mole Valley	No overall control	No overall control hold	Details
Newcastle-under-Lyme	Labour	Labour hold	Details
Norwich	Labour	Labour hold	Details
Nuneaton and Bedworth	Labour	Labour hold	Details
Oxford	Labour	Labour hold	Details
Pendle	Liberal Democrats	No overall control gain	Details
Penwith	No overall control	No overall control hold	Details
Preston	Labour	No overall control gain	Details
Redditch	Labour	Labour hold	Details
Reigate and Banstead	No overall control	No overall control hold	Details
Rochford	No overall control	No overall control hold	Details
Rossendale	Labour	Labour hold	Details
Rugby	No overall control	No overall control hold	Details
Runnymede	Conservative	Conservative hold	Details
Rushmoor	No overall control	No overall control hold	Details
Shrewsbury and Atcham	No overall control	No overall control hold	Details
South Bedfordshire	No overall control	No overall control hold	Details
South Cambridgeshire	No overall control	No overall control hold	Details
Stratford-on-Avon	No overall control	No overall control hold	Details
Stroud	No overall control	No overall control hold	Details
Swale	No overall control	No overall control hold	Details
Tamworth	Labour	Labour hold	Details
Tandridge	No overall control	No overall control hold	Details
Tunbridge Wells	Conservative	Conservative hold	Details
Waveney	Labour	Labour hold	Details
West Lancashire	Labour	Labour hold	Details
West Oxfordshire	No overall control	No overall control hold	Details
Weymouth and Portland	No overall control	No overall control hold	Details
Winchester	Liberal Democrats	Liberal Democrats hold	Details
Woking	No overall control	No overall control hold	Details
Worcester	Labour	Labour hold	Details
Worthing	Liberal Democrats	Conservative gain	Details
Wyre Forest	Labour	No overall control gain	Details

== Scotland ==
Council	Previous control	Result	Details
Aberdeen	Labour	Labour hold	Details
Aberdeenshire	No overall control	No overall control hold	Details
Angus	SNP	SNP hold	Details
Argyll and Bute	Independent	Independent hold	Details
Clackmannanshire	Labour	No overall control gain	Details
Dumfries and Galloway	Labour	Labour hold	Details
Dundee	Labour	No overall control gain	Details
East Ayrshire	Labour	Labour hold	Details
East Dunbartonshire	No overall control	No overall control hold	Details
East Lothian	Labour	Labour hold	Details
East Renfrewshire	No overall control	No overall control hold	Details
Edinburgh	Labour	Labour hold	Details
Falkirk	Labour	No overall control gain	Details
Fife	Labour	Labour hold	Details
Glasgow	Labour	Labour hold	Details
Highland	Independent	Independent hold	Details
Inverclyde	Labour	Labour hold	Details
Midlothian	Labour	Labour hold	Details
Moray	SNP	No overall control gain	Details
Na h-Eileanan Siar	Independent	Independent hold	Details
North Ayrshire	Labour	Labour hold	Details
North Lanarkshire	Labour	Labour hold	Details
Orkney Islands	Independent	Independent hold	Details
Perth and Kinross	No overall control	No overall control hold	Details
Renfrewshire	No overall control	Labour gain	Details
Scottish Borders	No overall control	No overall control hold	Details
Shetland Islands	Independent	Independent hold	Details
South Ayrshire	Labour	Labour hold	Details
South Lanarkshire	Labour	Labour hold	Details
Stirling	No overall control	No overall control hold	Details
West Dunbartonshire	Labour	Labour hold	Details
West Lothian	Labour	Labour hold	Details

== Wales ==
Council	Previous control	Result	Details
Blaenau Gwent	Labour	Labour hold	Details
Bridgend	Labour	Labour hold	Details
Caerphilly	Labour	Plaid Cymru gain	Details
Cardiff	Labour	Labour hold	Details
Carmarthenshire	No overall control	No overall control hold	Details
Ceredigion	Independent	No overall control gain	Details
Conwy	No overall control	No overall control hold	Details
Denbighshire	No overall control	No overall control hold	Details
Flintshire	Labour	Labour hold	Details
Gwynedd	Plaid Cymru	Plaid Cymru hold	Details
Isle of Anglesey	Independent	Independent hold	Details
Merthyr Tydfil	Labour	No overall control gain	Details
Monmouthshire	Labour	No overall control gain	Details
Neath Port Talbot	Labour	Labour hold	Details
Newport	Labour	Labour hold	Details
Pembrokeshire	Independent	Independent hold	Details
Powys	Independent	Independent hold	Details
Rhondda Cynon Taf	Labour	Plaid Cymru gain	Details
Swansea	Labour	Labour hold	Details
Torfaen	Labour	Labour hold	Details
Vale of Glamorgan	Labour	No overall control gain	Details
Wrexham	Labour	No overall control gain	Details
