= 1999 Lichfield District Council election =

1999 UK local government election

The 1999 Lichfield District Council election took place on 6 May 1999 to elect members of Lichfield District Council in Staffordshire, England. The whole council was up for election and the Conservative party gained overall control of the council from the Labour party.

== Campaign ==
56 Labour, 47 Conservative, 16 Liberal Democrats, 5 Independent and 1 Independent Labour candidates stood in the election. Each ward elected from one to three members of the council depending on the size of the ward. Five Labour candidates in Chase Terrace and Summerfield wards were elected unopposed.

One significant issue in the election campaign was a new traffic system the Labour council had just introduced on 1 April. This had banned vehicles from the centre of the city during the daytime and led to complaints from shopkeepers about loss of business. Other election issues raised in the campaign included rises in council taxes, plans to replace Burntwood Leisure Centre, the sale of 5,000 rented houses to a housing association, a proposed new housing development and anti-pollution measures.

During the campaign Lichfield was one of the councils visited by Conservative leader William Hague, on 29 April, with the overall local elections seen by commentators as crucial to his leadership of the party. Hague accused the Labour council of wasting money. For the Labour party, former EastEnders star Michael Cashman joined party workers in canvassing in Burntwood on 26 April.

In the election the Conservatives required a 7% swing to become the largest party and a 9% swing to gain overall control of the council. Lichfield was number 8 on their list of councils they were hoping to gain.

== Election result ==
The Conservatives retook control of the council that they had lost in the previous election in 1995. They gained two seats at Stowe ward after a recount and also gained in Lichfield City, Burntwood, Hammerwich and Alrewas wards. However the Liberal Democrats gained a seat in Mease Valley from the Conservatives. The results were sufficient to give the Conservatives a two-seat overall majority.

Lichfield local election result 1999
Party	Seats	Gains	Losses	Net gain/loss	Seats %	Votes %	Votes	+/−
Conservative	29			+8	51.8			
Labour	24			-7	42.9			
Liberal Democrats	2			0	3.6			
Independent	1			0	1.8			
Other parties	0			-1	0			

== Aftermath ==
Following the election Tony Nichols was elected chairman of the council by the new Conservative majority. However, there was controversy as the new opposition councillors claimed that the Conservatives did not give them as many seats on the council committees that they were legally due following the election.
