= 1999 Wyre Borough Council election =

Election

- 6 May 1999

All 56 seats to Wyre Borough Council 28 seats needed for a majority

	First party	Second party	Third party
Party	Conservative	Labour	Liberal Democrats
Last election	19	31	4
Seats won	34	20	2
Seat change	▲15	▼11	▼2
Popular vote	37,202	26,148	3,128
	Fourth party
Party	Residents
Last election	2
Seats won	0
Seat change	▼2
Leader before election
Labour
Leader after election
Conservative

The 1999 Wyre Borough Council election took place on 6 May 1999. This election was held on the same day as the 1999 United Kingdom local elections.

== Summary ==
The Conservatives regained some ground and increased their majority.

=== Election result ===
1999 Wyre Borough Council
Party	Candidates	Seats	Gains	Losses	Net gain/loss	Seats %	Votes %	Votes	+/−
Conservative	53	34	15	0	▲15			37,202	
Labour	46	20	1	12	▼11			26,148	
Liberal Democrats	7	2	0	2	▼2			3,128	
Residents	0	0	0	2	▼2			N/A	

== Ward Results ==
=== Bailey ===
Bailey (3 seats)
Party	Candidate	Votes	%	±%
Labour	Meehan P.	742	53.4	
Labour	Grunshaw C.*	737		
Labour	Robinson I. Ms.	691		
Conservative	Hamer M.	647	46.6	
Conservative	Taylor A. Ms.	535		
Conservative	Sillis C. Ms.	521		
Turnout		3,873	37.7	
Labour hold				
Labour hold				
Labour hold				

=== Bourne ===
Bourne (3 seats)
Party	Candidate	Votes	%	±%
Labour	Dawkins A.*	872	59.6	
Labour	Lees T.*	862		
Labour	Condron J.*	837		
Conservative	Schofield J.	590	40.4	
Conservative	Yates M. Ms.	575		
Conservative	Bailey A.*	553		
Turnout		4,289	28.4	
Labour hold				
Labour hold				
Labour hold				

=== Breck ===
Breck (2 seats)
Party	Candidate	Votes	%	±%
Conservative	Taylor H.*	920	71.3	
Conservative	Carroll F.*	855		
Labour	Jackson J. Ms.	371	28.7	
Labour	Robert S. Ms.	360		
Turnout		2,506	45.5	
Conservative hold				
Conservative hold				

=== Brock ===
Brock (1 seat)
Party	Candidate	Votes	%	±%
Conservative	Harrison R.	293	60.7	
Liberal Democrats	Watson B. Ms.	190	39.3	
Turnout		483	32.9	
Conservative hold				

=== Calder ===
Calder (1 seat)
Party	Candidate	Votes	%	±%
Liberal Democrats	Rogers J.*	316	55.6	
Conservative	McClintock S.	252	44.4	
Turnout		568	39.5	
Liberal Democrats hold				

=== Carleton ===
Carleton (2 seats)
Party	Candidate	Votes	%	±%
Conservative	Hargreaves J.	931	53.5	
Conservative	Gandhi F. Ms.	884		
Labour	Walker A.*	686	39.4	
Labour	Levey M. Ms.*	614		
Independent	Ward J.	122	7.0	
Turnout		3,237	43.4	
Conservative gain from Labour				
Conservative gain from Labour				

=== Catterall ===
Catterall (1 seat)
Party	Candidate	Votes	%	±%
Liberal Democrats	Sharples D.*	780	84.7	
Conservative	Wilson V. Ms.	141	15.3	
Turnout		921	55.5	
Liberal Democrats hold				

=== Cleveleys Park ===
Cleveleys Park (3 seats)
Party	Candidate	Votes	%	±%
Labour	Oxley D.*	751	50.7	
Conservative	Tebbs K.	731	49.3	
Conservative	Brooks A.	730		
Labour	Traynor J.*	713		
Labour	Steel P. Ms.*	703		
Conservative	Morley A.	701		
Turnout		4,329	38.2	
Labour hold				
Conservative gain from Labour				
Conservative gain from Labour				

=== Duchy ===
Duchy (1 seat)
Party	Candidate	Votes	%	±%
Conservative	Brooks R.	345	51.0	
Labour	Crouch T.*	332	49.0	
Turnout		677	43.7	
Conservative gain from Labour				

=== Garstang ===
Garstang (2 seats)
Party	Candidate	Votes	%	±%
Conservative	Atkins D. Ms.	1,084	61.2	
Conservative	Balmain T.	946		
Liberal Democrats	Cornthwaite A.	687	38.8	
Liberal Democrats	Harrison P.*	609		
Turnout		3,326	52.0	
Conservative gain from Liberal Democrats				
Conservative gain from Liberal Democrats				

=== Great Eccleston ===
Great Eccleston (1 seat)
Party	Candidate	Votes	%	±%
Conservative	Coop A.*	636	64.5	
Liberal Democrats	Graddon J.	350	35.5	
Turnout		986	42.2	
Conservative hold				

=== Hambleton ===
Hambleton (2 seats)
Party	Candidate	Votes	%	±%
Conservative	Bowen L. Ms.	969	64.1	
Conservative	Pimbley T.*	906		
Labour	Cameron R.*	543	35.9	
Turnout		2,418	38.9	
Conservative gain from Labour				
Conservative hold				

=== Hardhorn ===
Hardhorn (2 seats)
Party	Candidate	Votes	%	±%
Conservative	Cocker G.*	920	77.1	
Conservative	Turner F.	872		
Labour	Hacker I.	274	22.9	
Labour	Hoyer A.	246		
Turnout		2,312	47.7	
Conservative hold				
Conservative hold				

=== High Cross ===
High Cross (2 seats)
Party	Candidate	Votes	%	±%
Conservative	Catlow P. Ms.*	936	74.6	
Conservative	Richardson M.*	917		
Labour	Davis N.	319	25.4	
Labour	Hickson S.	303		
Turnout		2,475	49.4	
Conservative hold				
Conservative hold				

=== Jubilee ===
Jubilee (2 seats)
Party	Candidate	Votes	%	±%
Conservative	Heppenstall A.	586	59.2	
Conservative	Hodgkinson J.	571		
Labour	Meredith A.	404	40.8	
Labour	Robertshaw P.	389		
Turnout		1,950	31.2	
Conservative gain from Residents				
Labour gain from Labour				

=== Mount ===
Mount (2 seats)
Party	Candidate	Votes	%	±%
Labour	Anyon R.*	454	57.1	
Labour	Robinson G.	445		
Socialist	Jackson H.	176	22.1	
Conservative	Grant M. Ms.	165	20.8	
Turnout		1,240	27.6	
Labour hold				
Labour hold				

=== Norcross ===
Norcross (2 seats)
Party	Candidate	Votes	%	±%
Conservative	Jolley L.*	646	58.8	
Conservative	Bootle J.	624		
Labour	Pacey-Patrick E. Ms.*	453	41.2	
Labour	Smith P.	443		
Turnout		2,166	34.6	
Conservative gain from Labour				
Conservative hold				

=== Park ===
Park (3 seats)
Party	Candidate	Votes	%	±%
Labour	Leadbetter S.*	596	63.4	
Labour	Radcliffe I. Ms.*	553		
Labour	Horrocks G.*	537		
Conservative	Vincent K. Ms.	344	36.6	
Conservative	Cooke G.	329		
Turnout		2,359	26.0	
Labour hold				
Labour hold				
Labour hold				

=== Pharos ===
Pharos (2 seats)
Party	Candidate	Votes	%	±%
Labour	Hall A. Ms.*	553	71.4	
Labour	Shewan R.*	529		
Conservative	Barker L.	222	28.6	
Turnout		1,304	33.4	
Labour hold				
Labour hold				

=== Pilling ===
Pilling (1 seat)
Party	Candidate	Votes	%	±%
Conservative	Lawrenson D.*	386	66.3	
Liberal Democrats	Thompson N.	196	33.7	
Turnout		582	34.4	
Conservative hold				

=== Preesall ===
Preesall (3 seats)
Party	Candidate	Votes	%	±%
Conservative	McCann I.*	1,180	53.5	
Conservative	Mutch J. Ms.*	1,096		
Conservative	Taylor V. Ms.	1,072		
Labour	Higginson K.*	598	27.1	
Labour	Dore L.	524		
Independent	Hudson T.	427	19.4	
Turnout		4,897	43.7	
Conservative hold				
Conservative gain from Labour				
Conservative hold				

=== Rossall ===
Rossall (3 seats)
Party	Candidate	Votes	%	±%
Labour	Colby M. Ms.*	672	50.9	
Labour	Riley K.*	661		
Conservative	Smith E.	649		
Conservative	Walker K. Ms.	649	49.1	
Labour	Whittaker M. Ms.*	639		
Conservative	Thewlis F. Ms.	633		
Turnout		3,903	37.4	
Labour hold				
Labour hold				
Conservative gain from Labour				

=== Staina ===
Staina (3 seats)
Party	Candidate	Votes	%	±%
Conservative	Lawrenson R.*	1,009	55.7	
Conservative	Swain J.	991		
Conservative	Wilding A.	883		
Labour	Black J. Ms.*	801	44.3	
Labour	Ryder B.*	723		
Labour	Robert A.	670		
Turnout		5,077	43.8	
Conservative gain from Residents				
Conservative gain from Labour				
Conservative hold				

=== Tithebarn ===
Tithebarn (2 seats)
Party	Candidate	Votes	%	±%
Conservative	Bannister D.*	923	71.8	
Conservative	Hawley P.*	836		
Labour	Bailey G.	362	28.2	
Turnout		2,121	42.8	
Conservative hold				
Conservative hold				

=== Victoria ===
Victoria (3 seats)
Party	Candidate	Votes	%	±%
Conservative	Preston S. Ms.*	972	62.9	
Conservative	Amos R. Ms.	946		
Conservative	Vincent A.	915		
Labour	Greenhalgh F.	573	37.1	
Labour	Williams D.*	531		
Labour	Raffles C.	527		
Turnout		4,464	36.8	
Conservative gain from Labour				
Conservative hold				
Conservative hold				

=== Warren ===
Warren (3 seats)
Party	Candidate	Votes	%	±%
Labour	Anderton M. Ms.	838	58.2	
Labour	Butler I.*	821		
Labour	Irish G.*	726		
Conservative	Moss L. Ms.	602	41.8	
Conservative	Swarbrick D.	596		
Conservative	Smith L. Ms.	556		
Turnout		4,139	42.2	
Labour hold				
Labour hold				
Labour hold				

=== Wyresdale ===
Wyresdale (1 seat)
Party	Candidate	Votes	%	±%
Conservative	Collinson R.*	431	71.7	
Labour	Hughes R.	170	28.3	
Turnout		601	42.2	
Conservative hold				
