= 1999 Oxford City Council election =

1999 UK local government election

Elections to Oxford City Council were held on 6 May 1999. One third of the councils seats were up for election. The Labour party kept its overall majority on the council. The number of councillors for each party after the election were Labour 28, Liberal Democrat 16 and Green 7. Overall turnout was 29.2%

== Election result ==
Oxford local election result 1999
Party	Seats	Gains	Losses	Net gain/loss	Seats %	Votes %	Votes	+/−
Labour	8	0	5	-5	44.4	36.3	11,184	
Liberal Democrats	7	2	0	+2	38.9	28.2	8,687	
Green	3	3	0	+3	16.7	17.2	5,286	
Conservative	0	0	0	0	0	17.1	5,261	
Independent	0	0	0	0	0	1.0	307	
Liberal	0	0	0	0	0	0.3	84	

== Ward results ==
Blackbird Leys
Party	Candidate	Votes	%	±%
Labour	Atherton Stockford	783	73.3	
Conservative	David Timson	100	9.4	
Green	Patricia Dickson	95	8.9	
Liberal Democrats	Alexander Macfie	90	8.4	
Majority		683	63.9	
Turnout		1,068	13.6	
Labour hold		Swing		

Central
Party	Candidate	Votes	%	±%
Green	Emily Maynard	428	37.5	
Liberal Democrats	Michael Hopkins	310	27.1	
Conservative	Richard Atkinson	219	19.2	
Labour	Terry Johnson	185	16.2	
Majority		118	10.4	
Turnout		1,142	18.4	
Green gain from Labour		Swing		

Cherwell
Party	Candidate	Votes	%	±%
Liberal Democrats	Stephen Struthers	751	37.5	
Conservative	Simon Mort	681	34.0	
Labour	Peter Johnson	393	19.6	
Green	Malcolm Lee	177	8.8	
Majority		70	3.5	
Turnout		2,002	38.3	
Liberal Democrats hold		Swing		

East
Party	Candidate	Votes	%	±%
Green	Elise Benjamin	907	48.4	
Labour	Patrick Stannard	761	40.6	
Conservative	Thomas Garner	109	5.8	
Liberal Democrats	Pieter-Paul Barker	97	5.2	
Majority		146	7.8	
Turnout		1,874	31.4	
Green gain from Labour		Swing		

Headington
Party	Candidate	Votes	%	±%
Liberal Democrats	Jane Wyatt	710		
Labour	Leslie Town	687		
Liberal Democrats	Mark Whittaker	669		
Labour	Mary Sareva	641		
Conservative	Prudence Dailey	415		
Conservative	Georgina Shomroni	367		
Green	Stella Hudson	99		
Green	Mark Lynas	86		
Turnout		3,674	29.0	
Liberal Democrats gain from Labour		Swing		
Labour hold		Swing		

Iffley
Party	Candidate	Votes	%	±%
Labour	Carole Roberts	763	51.6	
Conservative	Paul Hernandez	356	24.1	
Green	Patrick Lingwood	188	12.7	
Liberal Democrats	David Rundle	173	11.7	
Majority		407	27.5	
Turnout		1,480	25.3	
Labour hold		Swing		

Littlemore
Party	Candidate	Votes	%	±%
Labour	William Buckingham	661	62.5	
Conservative	Christopher Connolly	179	16.9	
Liberal Democrats	Vicky Potter	109	10.3	
Green	Joanna Lavender	108	10.2	
Majority		482	45.6	
Turnout		1,057	20.5	
Labour hold		Swing		

Marston
Party	Candidate	Votes	%	±%
Labour	Maureen Christian	652	47.2	
Conservative	Richard Wylie	384	27.8	
Green	Katherine Wedell	176	12.7	
Liberal Democrats	Robert Fuller	170	12.3	
Majority		268	19.4	
Turnout		1,382	28.1	
Labour hold		Swing		

North
Party	Candidate	Votes	%	±%
Liberal Democrats	Richard Davy	795	49.9	
Labour	Mary Roe	284	17.8	
Conservative	Jason Tomes	254	15.9	
Green	Sophie Andrews	185	11.6	
Independent	John Rose	75	4.7	
Majority		511	32.1	
Turnout		1,593	27.0	
Liberal Democrats hold		Swing		

Old Marston & Risinghurst
Party	Candidate	Votes	%	±%
Liberal Democrats	Jonathan Coats	909	50.8	
Labour	Eamon Wadley	499	27.9	
Conservative	Duncan Hatfield	314	17.6	
Green	Pritam Singh	67	3.7	
Majority		410	22.9	
Turnout		1,789	35.9	
Liberal Democrats hold		Swing		

Quarry
Party	Candidate	Votes	%	±%
Liberal Democrats	George Kershaw	927	42.9	
Labour	Gillian Sanders	821	38.0	
Conservative	Stamford Marthews	312	14.5	
Green	Donald Smith	99	4.6	
Majority		106	4.9	
Turnout		2,159	35.1	
Liberal Democrats hold		Swing		

St. Clement's
Party	Candidate	Votes	%	±%
Green	Robert Sykes	824	43.6	
Labour	Susan Snelders	576	30.5	
Independent	David Leake	232	12.3	
Conservative	Robert Dukes	145	7.7	
Liberal Democrats	Martin Stone	113	6.0	
Majority		248	13.1	
Turnout		1,890	24.9	
Green gain from Labour		Swing		

South
Party	Candidate	Votes	%	±%
Labour	Robert Price	1,007	42.9	
Green	Deborah Glass	949	40.4	
Conservative	Neil Edmond	235	10.0	
Liberal Democrats	Rosalind Gill	157	6.7	
Majority		58	2.5	
Turnout		2,348	38.0	
Labour hold		Swing		

Temple Cowley
Party	Candidate	Votes	%	±%
Liberal Democrats	Philip Cockayne	889	51.5	
Labour	Cherry Mosteshar	610	35.3	
Conservative	James French	146	8.5	
Green	Lilia Patterson	81	4.7	
Majority		279	16.2	
Turnout		1,726	33.1	
Liberal Democrats gain from Labour		Swing		

West
Party	Candidate	Votes	%	±%
Labour	Colin Cook	854	40.7	
Liberal Democrats	Catherine Hilliard	626	29.8	
Green	Ceri Fielding	423	20.2	
Conservative	Kevin Jones	195	9.3	
Majority		228	10.9	
Turnout		2,098	35.5	
Labour hold		Swing		

Wolvercote
Party	Candidate	Votes	%	±%
Liberal Democrats	James Campbell	1,036	45.6	
Conservative	Graham Jones	661	29.1	
Labour	Sarah Escritt	312	13.7	
Green	Michael Buck	263	11.6	
Majority		375	16.5	
Turnout		2,272	41.2	
Liberal Democrats hold		Swing		

Wood Farm
Party	Candidate	Votes	%	±%
Labour	Alan Pope	695	55.4	
Conservative	Yun Wong	189	15.1	
Liberal Democrats	Antony Brett	156	12.4	
Green	David Dalton	131	10.4	
Liberal	Roger Jenking	84	6.7	
Majority		506	40.3	
Turnout		1,255	22.4	
Labour hold		Swing		

== See also ==
- 1999 United Kingdom local elections
- Elections in the United Kingdom
