= 1999 Bedford Borough Council election =

1999 UK local government election

The 1999 Bedford Borough Council election took place on 6 May 1999 to elect members of Bedford Borough Council in England. This was on the same day as other local elections.

== Summary ==
=== Election result ===
1999 Bedford Borough Council election
Party	This election			Full council			This election		
Party	Seats	Net	Seats %	Other	Total	Total %	Votes	Votes %	+/−
Labour	6	▼3	35.3	13	19	35.8	10,084	35.8	–0.6
Liberal Democrats	5	▲3	29.4	13	18	34.0	7,460	26.5	–1.5
Conservative	4	Steady	23.5	5	9	17.0	9,094	32.3	+2.2
Independent	2	Steady	11.8	5	7	13.2	1,552	5.5	±0.0

== Ward results ==
=== Brickhill ===
Brickhill
Party	Candidate	Votes	%	±%
Conservative	Eric Threapleton	1,110	45.0	+17.3
Liberal Democrats	Raymond Waterhouse*	1,012	41.1	–14.0
Labour	Yvonne Anderson	342	13.9	−3.3
Majority		98	4.0	
Turnout		2,464	42.3	
Registered electors		5,833		
Conservative gain from Liberal Democrats		Swing		

=== Bromham ===
Bromham
Party	Candidate	Votes	%	±%
Conservative	Dean Laley*	1,150	68.9	+18.0
Labour	Roger Jackson	307	18.4	–0.6
Liberal Democrats	Robert Howker	212	12.7	–17.5
Majority		843	50.5	
Turnout		1,669	32.2	
Registered electors		5,188		
Conservative hold		Swing		

=== Castle ===
Castle
Party	Candidate	Votes	%	±%
Labour	Christopher Whitehead*	862	50.6	–6.6
Conservative	Robert Rigby	650	38.1	+15.6
Liberal Democrats	Stephen Lawson	192	11.3	−9.0
Majority		212	12.4	
Turnout		1,704	37.0	
Registered electors		4,599		
Labour hold		Swing		

=== Cauldwell ===
Cauldwell
Party	Candidate	Votes	%	±%
Labour	Randolph Charles	1,201	76.5	−4.7
Conservative	Janet Pilgrim	201	12.8	+4.2
Liberal Democrats	Anita Gerard	167	10.6	+0.4
Majority		1,000	63.7	
Turnout		1,569	25.8	
Registered electors		6,130		
Labour hold		Swing		

=== Clapham ===
Clapham
Party	Candidate	Votes	%	±%
Conservative	Arthur Foster	419	41.0	+14.1
Labour	Jennifer Jackson*	418	40.9	+11.7
Liberal Democrats	Giorgio Garofolo	184	18.0	+3.1
Majority		1	0.1	
Turnout		1,021	37.0	
Registered electors		2,773		
Conservative gain from Labour		Swing		

=== De Parys ===
De Parys
Party	Candidate	Votes	%	±%
Liberal Democrats	Neal Bath	955	44.2	–6.6
Conservative	Terence Rigby	872	38.9	+11.9
Labour	Charles Baily	334	15.5	−6.7
Majority		83	3.8	
Turnout		2,161	38.3	
Registered electors		5,668		
Liberal Democrats hold		Swing		

=== Goldington ===
Goldington
Party	Candidate	Votes	%	±%
Liberal Democrats	Anthony Ruffin*	1,006	53.6	−2.5
Labour	Laurence Evans	730	38.9	+0.8
Conservative	Valerie Fulford	140	7.5	+1.7
Majority		276	14.7	
Turnout		1,876	35.8	
Registered electors		5,255		
Liberal Democrats hold		Swing		

=== Great Barford ===
Great Barford
Party	Candidate	Votes	%	±%
Conservative	Carole Ellis*	488	69.8	+16.6
Labour	Richard Crane	136	19.5	–13.0
Liberal Democrats	Veronica Harvey	75	10.7	–3.6
Majority		352	50.4	
Turnout		699	35.6	
Registered electors		1,968		
Conservative hold		Swing		

=== Harpur ===
Harpur
Party	Candidate	Votes	%	±%
Labour	Ian Nicholls*	834	56.6	–9.2
Conservative	Jean Pilgrim	466	31.6	+10.1
Liberal Democrats	Susan Vogel	173	11.7	+2.3
Majority		368	25.0	
Turnout		1,473	24.8	
Registered electors		5,952		
Labour hold		Swing		

=== Kempston East ===
Kempston East
Party	Candidate	Votes	%	±%
Labour	David Lewis*	1,157	53.6	–5.5
Conservative	Richard Hyde	800	37.0	+5.5
Liberal Democrats	Jacqueline Smithson	203	9.4	±0.0
Majority		357	16.5	
Turnout		2,160	29.7	
Registered electors		7,346		
Labour hold		Swing		

=== Kempston Rural ===
Kempston Rural
Party	Candidate	Votes	%	±%
Liberal Democrats	Sarah Fogarty	482	44.2	+10.5
Conservative	David Reedman	475	43.6	+2.8
Labour	Adrien Beardmore	133	12.2	–13.3
Majority		7	0.6	
Turnout		1,090	49.1	
Registered electors		2,231		
Liberal Democrats gain from Conservative		Swing		

=== Kempston West ===
Kempston West
Party	Candidate	Votes	%	±%
Labour	Christopher Black*	1,023	50.9	–11.8
Conservative	Charlotte Attenborough	875	43.5	+16.1
Liberal Democrats	Philip Standley	113	5.6	–4.3
Majority		148	7.4	
Turnout		2,011	30.9	
Registered electors		6,561		
Labour hold		Swing		

=== Kingsbrook ===
Kingsbrook
Party	Candidate	Votes	%	±%
Liberal Democrats	Shirley McKay	847	51.0	+39.8
Labour	Frank Garrick*	696	41.9	–33.2
Conservative	Janet Suter	119	7.2	–6.5
Majority		151	9.1	
Turnout		1,662	34.0	
Registered electors		4,901		
Liberal Democrats gain from Labour		Swing		

=== Putnoe ===
Putnoe
Party	Candidate	Votes	%	±%
Liberal Democrats	Rosemary Bootiman	1,158	61.7	+2.0
Conservative	Denise Coates	502	26.7	+2.3
Labour	David Lukes	217	11.6	−4.3
Majority		656	34.9	
Turnout		1,877	35.0	
Registered electors		5,381		
Liberal Democrats hold		Swing		

=== Queens Park ===
Queens Park
Party	Candidate	Votes	%	±%
Labour	Muhammad Khan*	1,420	72.2	–1.0
Conservative	Michael Williams	328	16.7	+2.7
Liberal Democrats	Michael Murphy	219	11.1	–1.8
Majority		1,092	55.5	
Turnout		1,967	32.0	
Registered electors		6,238		
Labour hold		Swing		

=== Sharnbrook ===
Sharnbrook
Party	Candidate	Votes	%	±%
Independent	William Bates	412	42.6	N/A
Conservative	Robert Pearson*	331	34.2	–10.7
Labour	Anthea Cooke	181	18.7	–13.2
Liberal Democrats	Christopher Hall	44	4.5	–8.0
Majority		81	8.4	
Turnout		968	46.1	
Registered electors		2,101		
Independent gain from Conservative		Swing		

=== Wootton ===
Wootton
Party	Candidate	Votes	%	±%
Independent	Mark Smith*	1,140	62.7	+34.4
Liberal Democrats	Ian White	418	23.0	–0.5
Conservative	Vivian Suter	168	9.2	–15.5
Labour	Paban Sharma	93	5.1	–18.4
Majority		722	39.7	
Turnout		1,819	46.1	
Registered electors		3,955		
Independent hold		Swing		
