= 1999 Leicester City Council election =

1999 English local election

The 1999 Leicester City Council election took place on 6 May 1999 to elect members of Leicester City Council in England. This was on the same day as other local elections.

== Summary ==
1999 Leicester City Council election
Party	Seats	Gains	Losses	Net gain/loss	Seats %	Votes %	Votes	+/−
Labour	30			▼11	53.6	47.7	62,394	–9.3
Liberal Democrats	16			▲8	28.6	27.2	35,650	+9.2
Conservative	10			▲3	17.9	22.2	29,051	+1.1
Green	0			Steady	0.0	2.2	2,859	+0.4
Independent	0			Steady	0.0	0.5	686	N/A
Socialist Labour	0			Steady	0.0	0.2	244	N/A
