= 1999 Luton Borough Council election =

Local election in England

- 6 May 1999

All 48 seats to Luton Borough Council 25 seats needed for a majority

	First party	Second party	Third party
Party	Labour	Liberal Democrats	Conservative
Seats won	36	9	3
Seat change	Steady	Steady	Steady
Popular vote	52,040	24,607	26,871
Percentage	48.4%	22.9%	25.0%
Swing	▼2.9%	▼0.4%	▲1.7%
Control before election
Labour
Control after election
Labour

The 1999 Luton Borough Council election took place on 6 May 1999 to elect members of Luton Borough Council in Bedfordshire, England. This was on the same day as other local elections.

== Summary ==
=== Election result ===
1999 Luton Borough Council election
Party	Candidates	Seats	Gains	Losses	Net gain/loss	Seats %	Votes %	Votes	+/−
Labour	48	36	0	0	Steady	75.0	48.4	52,040	–2.9
Liberal Democrats	47	9	0	0	Steady	18.8	22.9	24,607	–0.4
Conservative	48	3	0	0	Steady	6.3	25.0	26,871	+1.7
Independent	15	0	0	0	Steady	0.0	3.0	3,207	N/A
Green	7	0	0	0	Steady	0.0	0.7	768	±0.0

== Ward results ==
Incumbent councillors standing for re-election are marked with an asterisk (*). Changes in seats do not take into account by-elections or defections.

=== Biscot ===
Biscot (3 seats)
Party	Candidate	Votes	%	±%
Labour	M. Ali	1,768	49.6	+1.1
Labour	N. White*	1,734	48.6	+2.8
Labour	M. Hussain	1,592	44.7	+1.6
Liberal Democrats	A. Ahmed	908	25.5	–11.8
Independent	S. Rahman	897	25.2	N/A
Conservative	M. Riaz	650	18.2	–6.3
Conservative	M. Zia	471	13.2	–3.3
Conservative	G. Mohiuddin	460	12.9	–0.4
Liberal Democrats	C. Mead	344	9.7	+0.4
Independent	M. Bashir	175	4.9	N/A
Independent	M. Ayub	174	4.9	N/A
Green	E. Rushby	122	3.4	N/A
Turnout		~3,565	39.9	+1.4
Registered electors		8,934		
Labour hold				
Labour hold				
Labour hold				

=== Bramingham ===
Bramingham (3 seats)
Party	Candidate	Votes	%	±%
Labour	B. Devenish*	1,073	44.4	+1.0
Labour	D. Worlding*	1,033	42.7	+2.0
Labour	M. Akhtar*	945	39.1	+0.7
Conservative	G. Campbell	909	37.6	+1.2
Conservative	A. Bradley	891	36.8	+1.6
Conservative	A. Healey	890	36.8	+1.7
Liberal Democrats	P. Chapman	293	12.1	–5.3
Liberal Democrats	M. Lincoln	276	11.4	–4.1
Liberal Democrats	S. Rutstein	209	8.6	–5.8
Independent	R. Dean	206	8.5	N/A
Independent	I. Brodie	99	4.1	N/A
Turnout		~2,419	24.7	–3.5
Registered electors		9,792		
Labour hold				
Labour hold				
Labour hold				

=== Challney ===
Challney (3 seats)
Party	Candidate	Votes	%	±%
Labour	R. Davis	1,259	54.9	+0.4
Labour	W. Akbar*	1,167	50.9	–2.4
Labour	M. Edwards	1,156	50.4	–1.9
Conservative	G. Dillingham	646	28.2	+0.6
Conservative	S. Khan	591	25.8	–1.6
Conservative	B. Hafeez	564	24.6	–0.9
Liberal Democrats	D. Chapman	333	14.5	+2.2
Liberal Democrats	D. De-Groot	242	10.6	–1.2
Liberal Democrats	A. Gaughan	226	9.9	+0.4
Turnout		~2,294	28.1	–4.0
Registered electors		8,163		
Labour hold				
Labour hold				
Labour hold				

=== Crawley ===
Crawley (3 seats)
Party	Candidate	Votes	%	±%
Liberal Democrats	D. Franks*	1,391	61.6	+9.8
Liberal Democrats	L. Patterson*	1,322	58.5	+8.2
Liberal Democrats	J. Felmingham*	1,314	58.2	+8.3
Labour	J. Adams	633	28.0	–8.7
Labour	R. Bath	536	23.7	–12.9
Labour	M. Goni	503	22.3	–13.8
Conservative	M. Thomas	232	10.3	+2.1
Conservative	N. Feerick	228	10.1	+2.5
Conservative	G. Victor	208	9.2	+1.7
Green	S. Cain	83	3.7	N/A
Turnout		~2,259	28.4	–12.1
Registered electors		7,954		
Liberal Democrats hold				
Liberal Democrats hold				
Liberal Democrats hold				

=== Dallow ===
Dallow (3 seats)
Party	Candidate	Votes	%	±%
Labour	Z. Ahmed*	2,172	68.9	–9.1
Labour	M. Ashraf*	2,116	67.1	–9.3
Labour	D. Taylor*	1,693	53.7	–21.1
Liberal Democrats	M. Choudhury	799	25.3	+13.5
Conservative	N. Imtiaz	646	20.5	+7.6
Conservative	M. Khan	463	14.7	+2.9
Liberal Democrats	M. Knape	462	14.6	+6.5
Independent	M. Sulaiman	434	13.8	N/A
Liberal Democrats	R. Knape	420	13.3	+5.3
Conservative	A. Karim	259	8.2	–2.8
Turnout		~3,155	34.0	+2.0
Registered electors		7,357		
Labour hold				
Labour hold				
Labour hold				

=== Farley ===
Farley (3 seats)
Party	Candidate	Votes	%	±%
Labour	L. McCowan*	1,334	72.0	–0.6
Labour	J. Boyle*	1,316	71.0	+0.8
Labour	W. McKenzie	1,310	70.7	+1.1
Conservative	W. Hooper	276	14.9	+1.4
Conservative	K. Drew	271	14.6	+1.7
Conservative	P. Platt	254	13.7	+1.3
Liberal Democrats	M. Howes	138	7.4	–1.2
Liberal Democrats	A. Skepelhorn	131	7.1	–1.0
Liberal Democrats	J. Varnals	117	6.3	–1.0
Independent	C. Lawman	65	3.5	N/A
Turnout		~1,853	26.7	–3.6
Registered electors		6,940		
Labour hold				
Labour hold				
Labour hold				

=== High Town ===
High Town (3 seats)
Party	Candidate	Votes	%	±%
Labour	Z. Moran*	1,081	57.3	+2.4
Labour	H. Magill*	1,052	55.7	+2.4
Labour	L. Singh	915	48.5	+3.4
Conservative	K. Connolly	492	26.1	+1.1
Conservative	S. Garfield	459	24.3	–0.4
Conservative	S. Victor	454	24.1	+0.8
Liberal Democrats	J. Bonner	243	12.9	+0.8
Liberal Democrats	C. Cason	211	11.2	–0.3
Liberal Democrats	M. Lincoln	193	10.2	–0.6
Green	L. Bliss	161	8.5	–0.4
Turnout		~1,888	25.1	–7.3
Registered electors		7,520		
Labour hold				
Labour hold				
Labour hold				

=== Icknield ===
Icknield (3 seats)
Party	Candidate	Votes	%	±%
Conservative	V. Dunington*	1,459	55.5	+5.2
Conservative	D. Johnston*	1,401	53.3	+6.0
Conservative	A. Flint	1,392	53.0	+6.3
Labour	M. Grant	893	34.0	–4.9
Labour	P. Gowers	856	32.6	–5.3
Labour	A. Roden	793	30.2	–7.6
Liberal Democrats	A. Farrow	296	11.3	+0.6
Liberal Democrats	D. Hinckley	287	10.9	+1.1
Liberal Democrats	T. Keens	264	10.0	+0.4
Turnout		~2,629	27.7	–8.4
Registered electors		9,490		
Conservative hold				
Conservative hold				
Conservative hold				

=== Leagrave ===
Leagrave (3 seats)
Party	Candidate	Votes	%	±%
Labour	D. Patten*	1,011	54.9	–2.6
Labour	D. Stewart*	990	53.8	±0.0
Labour	S. Roden*	983	53.4	+0.5
Conservative	J. Titmuss	578	31.4	+5.1
Conservative	P. O'Neill	558	30.3	+5.0
Conservative	J. Heredia	534	29.0	+5.2
Liberal Democrats	J. Doyle	207	11.2	+1.9
Liberal Democrats	Y. Edmunds	185	10.1	+1.4
Liberal Democrats	J. Bannan	166	9.0	+0.5
Turnout		~1,841	23.6	–4.8
Registered electors		7,799		
Labour hold				
Labour hold				
Labour hold				

=== Lewsey ===
Lewsey (3 seats)
Party	Candidate	Votes	%	±%
Labour	M. Hand*	1,166	73.7	+3.9
Labour	T. Shaw*	1,141	72.1	+3.0
Labour	H. Simmons	1,046	66.1	+1.9
Conservative	M. Hall	361	22.8	+7.3
Conservative	T. Halls	352	22.2	+7.1
Conservative	R. Quinn	343	21.7	+6.7
Liberal Democrats	M. Robinson	210	13.3	+4.0
Liberal Democrats	H. Soni	150	9.5	+0.7
Liberal Democrats	R. Soni	118	7.5	–1.3
Green	L. Da Rold	99	6.3	N/A
Turnout		~1,583	18.1	–8.8
Registered electors		8,745		
Labour hold				
Labour hold				
Labour hold				

=== Limbury ===
Limbury (3 seats)
Party	Candidate	Votes	%	±%
Labour	K. McCarthy	1,156	54.2	–0.8
Labour	N. Bullock*	1,144	53.7	+0.7
Labour	R. Harris*	1,143	53.6	+2.2
Conservative	A. Bradley	554	26.0	+4.6
Conservative	P. Glenister	531	24.9	+4.5
Conservative	S. Lister	491	23.0	+15.8
Independent	C. Brown	275	12.9	–4.7
Independent	V. King	157	7.4	–5.4
Independent	L. Mitchell	155	7.3	–4.9
Liberal Democrats	J. Harding	152	7.1	–0.6
Liberal Democrats	P. Elmes	149	7.0	+0.3
Liberal Democrats	L. McColm	144	6.8	+0.2
Green	J. Blake	65	3.0	N/A
Turnout		~2,131	30.0	–3.2
Registered electors		7,104		
Labour hold				
Labour hold				
Labour hold				

=== Putteridge ===
Putteridge (3 seats)
Party	Candidate	Votes	%	±%
Liberal Democrats	R. Davies*	1,937	60.2	–1.0
Liberal Democrats	R. Greenham*	1,849	57.5	–1.0
Liberal Democrats	H. Siederer	1,733	53.9	–3.1
Labour	J. Warburton	654	20.3	+1.8
Labour	A. Thompson	636	19.8	+2.3
Conservative	J. Ashby	634	19.7	±0.0
Conservative	M. Bradley	613	19.1	–0.5
Conservative	J. Pemberton	613	19.1	+0.5
Labour	D. Shokar	537	16.7	+0.2
Turnout		~3,215	28.6	–8.3
Registered electors		11,243		
Liberal Democrats hold				
Liberal Democrats hold				
Liberal Democrats hold				

=== Saints ===
Saints (3 seats)
Party	Candidate	Votes	%	±%
Labour	R. Saleem*	1,352	45.6	–5.1
Labour	L. Hambleton	1,317	44.4	–5.3
Labour	M. Yasin	1,191	40.1	–9.2
Conservative	M. Riaz	1,190	40.1	+5.9
Conservative	S. Bradley	807	27.2	–0.5
Conservative	A. Johnson	798	26.9	+0.1
Liberal Democrats	D. Malins	241	8.1	–2.7
Liberal Democrats	B. Murray	239	8.1	–1.9
Liberal Democrats	E. Hird	210	7.1	–2.6
Independent	A. Hussain	125	4.2	N/A
Independent	S. Ali	125	4.2	N/A
Independent	M. Ashraf*	106	3.6	N/A
Independent	P. Mills	91	3.1	N/A
Turnout		~2,968	36.5	–0.9
Registered electors		8,131		
Labour hold				
Labour hold				
Labour hold				

=== South ===
South (3 seats)
Party	Candidate	Votes	%	±%
Labour	A. Flegmann*	949	53.9	–1.1
Labour	T. Hoyle*	922	52.4	–0.5
Labour	T. Jenkins	886	50.4	–0.2
Conservative	J. McKenna	501	28.5	+2.7
Conservative	S. Benjamin	498	28.3	+5.1
Conservative	M. Tantardini	455	25.9	N/A
Green	M. Scheimann	167	9.5	+1.8
Liberal Democrats	W. Cole	143	8.1	–0.6
Liberal Democrats	J. Mead	136	7.7	–0.8
Independent	J. Duncan	123	7.0	N/A
Liberal Democrats	M. Varnals	114	6.5	–0.7
Turnout		~1,760	19.3	–5.7
Registered electors		9,117		
Labour hold				
Labour hold				
Labour hold				

=== Stopsley ===
Stopsley (3 seats)
Party	Candidate	Votes	%	±%
Liberal Democrats	J. Davies*	1,359	57.1	–6.4
Liberal Democrats	M. Dolling*	1,285	54.0	–3.3
Liberal Democrats	J. Wates*	1,240	52.1	–3.2
Labour	J. Davis	674	28.3	+2.9
Labour	R. Berry	600	25.2	+3.6
Labour	T. Utting	537	22.6	+2.2
Conservative	J. Halls	355	14.9	+1.7
Conservative	D. Collins	355	14.9	+3.3
Conservative	J. Denis-Smith	353	14.8	+3.6
Green	J. Fearnley	71	3.0	N/A
Turnout		~2,378	33.6	–5.7
Registered electors		7,078		
Liberal Democrats hold				
Liberal Democrats hold				
Liberal Democrats hold				

=== Sundon Park ===
Sundon Park (3 seats)
Party	Candidate	Votes	%	±%
Labour	S. Knight*	1,086	46.0	–24.5
Labour	D. Cole	1,017	43.1	–23.0
Labour	A. Banerji	974	41.3	–24.8
Liberal Democrats	D. Sawtell	760	32.2	+22.7
Liberal Democrats	D. Larkham*	736	31.2	+23.3
Liberal Democrats	A. Strange	725	30.7	+23.5
Conservative	S. Harrison	286	12.1	–5.1
Conservative	J. O'Neill	279	11.8	–4.2
Conservative	J. Titmuss	266	11.3	–4.7
Turnout		~2,360	32.3	+4.7
Registered electors		7,308		
Labour hold				
Labour hold				
Labour hold				
