= 1999 Forest Heath District Council election =

Forest Heath District Council election

The 1999 Forest Heath District Council election took place on 6 May 1999 to elect members of Forest Heath District Council in England. This was on the same day as other local elections.

== Results summary ==
1999 Forest Heath District Council election
Party	Seats	Gains	Losses	Net gain/loss	Seats %	Votes %	Votes	+/−
Conservative	21			▲11	84.0	62.6	10,746	+22.6
Liberal Democrats	2			▼4	8.0	3.7	629	-16.2
Labour	1			▼3	4.0	25.4	4,367	+0.5
Independent	1			▼4	4.0	8.3	1,426	-6.8
