= 1999 South Oxfordshire District Council election =

1999 UK local government election

The 1999 South Oxfordshire District Council election took place on 6 May 1999 to elect members of South Oxfordshire District Council, a non-metropolitan district council in Oxfordshire, England. This was part of the wider 1999 UK local elections. The whole council was up for election and the council stayed under no overall control.

== Election result ==
South Oxfordshire local election result 1999
Party	Seats	Gains	Losses	Net gain/loss	Seats %	Votes %	Votes	+/−
Conservative	20			+11	40.0			
Liberal Democrats	20			-1	40.0			
Labour	7			-6	14.0			
Independent	3			-2	6.0			
Residents	0			-2	0			
