= 1999 Great Yarmouth Borough Council election =

1999 UK local government election

The 1999 Great Yarmouth Borough Council election took place on 6 May 1999 to elect members of Great Yarmouth Borough Council in Norfolk, England. One third of the council was up for election and the Labour Party stayed in overall control of the council.

After the election, the composition of the council was:

- Labour 29
- Conservative 19

== Election result ==
Great Yarmouth local election result 1999
Party	Seats	Gains	Losses	Net gain/loss	Seats %	Votes %	Votes	+/−
Conservative	9			+7	56.3			
Labour	7			-7	43.8			
