= 1999 Penwith District Council election =

1999 UK local government election

Elections to Penwith District Council were held on 6 May 1999. One third of the council was up for election and the council stayed under no overall control. Overall turnout was 34.1%.

After the election, the composition of the council was:

- Liberal Democrat 9
- Conservative 9
- Independent 8
- Labour 5
- Others 2
- Vacant 1

== Results ==
Penwith local election result 1999
Party	Seats	Gains	Losses	Net gain/loss	Seats %	Votes %	Votes	+/−
Conservative	5			+2	45.5			
Independent	5			+1	45.5			
Labour	1			-1	9.1			
Liberal Democrats	0			-2	0.0			
