= 1999 Sedgemoor District Council election =

1999 UK local government election

Map of the results of the 1999 Sedgemoor District Council election.

The 1999 Sedgemoor District Council election took place on 6 May 1999 to elect members of Sedgemoor District Council in Somerset, England. The whole council was up for election with boundary changes since the last election in 1995 increasing the number of seats by 1. The election saw the Conservative party gain overall control of the council from no overall control.

== Election result ==
Sedgemoor local election result 1999
Party	Seats	Gains	Losses	Net gain/loss	Seats %	Votes %	Votes	+/−
Conservative	31			+9	62.0			
Labour	16			+3	32.0			
Liberal Democrats	2			-10	4.0			
Independent	1			-1	2.0			
