= 1999 Harrogate Borough Council election =

1999 UK local government election

The 1999 Harrogate Council election took place on 6 May 1999 to elect members of Harrogate Borough Council in North Yorkshire, England. One third of the council was up for election and the Liberal Democrats stayed in overall control of the council.

After the election, the composition of the council was:

- Liberal Democrat 41
- Conservative 15
- Labour 3

== Election result ==
Overall turnout in the election was 33.0%.

Harrogate local election result 1999
| Party | Seats | Gains | Losses | Net gain/loss | Seats % | Votes % | Votes | +/− |
|---|---|---|---|---|---|---|---|---|
| Liberal Democrats | 15 | | | -1 | 71.4 | 50.5 | 15,588 | +1.7% |
| Conservative | 6 | | | +3 | 28.6 | 39.0 | 12,043 | +1.8% |
| Labour | 0 | | | -1 | 0 | 10.4 | 3,216 | -1.1% |
| Independent | 0 | | | -1 | 0 | 0 | 0 | -2.4% |

== Ward results ==
Bilton (2)
| Party | Candidate | Votes | % | ±% |
|---|---|---|---|---|
| Liberal Democrats | Morris Lightfoot | 716 | | |
| Liberal Democrats | Andrew Goss | 660 | | |
| Labour | Bryan Robinson | 441 | | |
| Labour | Peter Caunt | 423 | | |
| Conservative | Heather Adderley | 412 | | |
| Conservative | Robin Adderley | 392 | | |
| Turnout | | 3,044 | 27.8 | +2.5 |

Boroughbridge
| Party | Candidate | Votes | % | ±% |
|---|---|---|---|---|
| Conservative | Brian Lumsden | 619 | 68.2 | |
| Liberal Democrats | Nicholas Stringer | 196 | 21.6 | |
| Labour | Alan Woodhead | 92 | 10.1 | |
| Majority | | 423 | 46.6 | |
| Turnout | | 907 | 33.1 | |

Duchy
| Party | Candidate | Votes | % | ±% |
|---|---|---|---|---|
| Liberal Democrats | Jane Blayney | 1,030 | 56.4 | −4.7 |
| Conservative | Paul Eustace | 670 | 36.7 | +5.3 |
| Labour | Anthony Blakesley | 125 | 6.8 | −0.6 |
| Majority | | 360 | 19.7 | −10.0 |
| Turnout | | 1,825 | 27.1 | +4.1 |

East Central
| Party | Candidate | Votes | % | ±% |
|---|---|---|---|---|
| Liberal Democrats | Susan Hyde | 820 | 61.8 | +2.2 |
| Conservative | William Hartmann | 318 | 24.0 | −0.6 |
| Labour | Simon Hutchings | 189 | 14.2 | −1.6 |
| Majority | | 502 | 37.8 | +2.8 |
| Turnout | | 1,327 | 26.4 | +2.7 |

Fountains
| Party | Candidate | Votes | % | ±% |
|---|---|---|---|---|
| Conservative | David Carter | 333 | 54.0 | |
| Liberal Democrats | Gillian Ford | 209 | 33.9 | |
| Labour | Deborah Havercroft | 75 | 12.2 | |
| Majority | | 124 | 20.1 | |
| Turnout | | 617 | 33.5 | |

Granby
| Party | Candidate | Votes | % | ±% |
|---|---|---|---|---|
| Liberal Democrats | John Fox | 894 | 70.4 | +4.2 |
| Conservative | Adam Pritchard | 204 | 16.1 | −2.0 |
| Labour | David King | 171 | 13.5 | −2.2 |
| Majority | | 690 | 54.4 | +6.3 |
| Turnout | | 1,269 | 23.5 | +3.9 |

Harlow
| Party | Candidate | Votes | % | ±% |
|---|---|---|---|---|
| Conservative | Robert Nash | 1,347 | 54.5 | +10.1 |
| Liberal Democrats | David Jacobs | 1,010 | 40.9 | −10.9 |
| Labour | Harry Sutcliffe | 113 | 4.6 | +0.8 |
| Majority | | 337 | 13.6 | |
| Turnout | | 2,470 | 40.5 | +0.5 |

Knaresborough East
| Party | Candidate | Votes | % | ±% |
|---|---|---|---|---|
| Liberal Democrats | David Tankard | 845 | 43.0 | −5.7 |
| Conservative | John Smith | 743 | 37.9 | +6.2 |
| Labour | Alan Beatham | 375 | 19.1 | −0.5 |
| Majority | | 102 | 5.2 | −11.8 |
| Turnout | | 1,963 | 33.3 | +5.0 |

Knaresborough West
| Party | Candidate | Votes | % | ±% |
|---|---|---|---|---|
| Liberal Democrats | Bill Hoult | 885 | 44.4 | +10.1 |
| Labour | Althea Farmer | 620 | 31.1 | −7.5 |
| Conservative | Michael Hill | 489 | 24.5 | −2.6 |
| Majority | | 265 | 13.3 | |
| Turnout | | 1,994 | 34.9 | −1.3 |

Mashamshire
| Party | Candidate | Votes | % | ±% |
|---|---|---|---|---|
| Conservative | Nigel Simms | 480 | 49.8 | |
| Liberal Democrats | Thomas Mould | 445 | 46.2 | |
| Labour | Colin Gurkin | 38 | 3.9 | |
| Majority | | 35 | 3.6 | |
| Turnout | | 963 | 52.4 | |

Nidd Valley
| Party | Candidate | Votes | % | ±% |
|---|---|---|---|---|
| Liberal Democrats | Leslie Ellington | 613 | 76.1 | |
| Conservative | Vanessa Stein | 192 | 23.9 | |
| Majority | | 421 | 52.3 | |
| Turnout | | 805 | 41.2 | |

Ouseburn
| Party | Candidate | Votes | % | ±% |
|---|---|---|---|---|
| Liberal Democrats | Christine Lewis | 707 | 61.7 | |
| Conservative | Robert Umbers | 438 | 38.3 | |
| Majority | | 269 | 23.5 | |
| Turnout | | 1,145 | 55.3 | |

Pannal
| Party | Candidate | Votes | % | ±% |
|---|---|---|---|---|
| Conservative | Michael Gardner | 1,507 | 56.5 | −0.2 |
| Liberal Democrats | Margaret Hart | 1,081 | 40.5 | −0.1 |
| Labour | Cynthia Coltman | 79 | 3.0 | +0.3 |
| Majority | | 426 | 16.0 | −0.1 |
| Turnout | | 2,667 | 52.4 | −0.1 |

Pateley Bridge
| Party | Candidate | Votes | % | ±% |
|---|---|---|---|---|
| Liberal Democrats | Patricia Barter | 482 | 56.2 | |
| Conservative | Brian Smalley | 328 | 38.2 | |
| Labour | Trevor Nuttall | 48 | 5.6 | |
| Majority | | 154 | 17.9 | |
| Turnout | | 858 | 43.5 | |

Ripon East
| Party | Candidate | Votes | % | ±% |
|---|---|---|---|---|
| Liberal Democrats | David Parnaby | 793 | 56.2 | −0.4 |
| Conservative | David Briscombe | 619 | 43.8 | +0.4 |
| Majority | | 174 | 12.3 | −1.0 |
| Turnout | | 1,412 | 24.8 | +9.4 |

Ripon West
| Party | Candidate | Votes | % | ±% |
|---|---|---|---|---|
| Liberal Democrats | Paul Freeman | 1,070 | 66.7 | +3.4 |
| Conservative | Stephanie Haithwaite | 534 | 33.3 | −3.4 |
| Majority | | 536 | 33.4 | +6.9 |
| Turnout | | 1,604 | 28.2 | +5.4 |

Starbeck
| Party | Candidate | Votes | % | ±% |
|---|---|---|---|---|
| Liberal Democrats | Philip Broadbank | 940 | 71.9 | +25.4 |
| Conservative | Phillip Dixon | 213 | 16.3 | +8.3 |
| Labour | Geoffrey Foxall | 154 | 11.8 | +4.2 |
| Majority | | 727 | 55.6 | +46.9 |
| Turnout | | 1,307 | 24.9 | −6.1 |

Wedderburn
| Party | Candidate | Votes | % | ±% |
|---|---|---|---|---|
| Liberal Democrats | Reginald Marsh | 1,056 | 49.0 | −1.4 |
| Conservative | Nigel Middlemass | 980 | 45.5 | +4.6 |
| Labour | Robert Swithinbank | 119 | 5.5 | −3.2 |
| Majority | | 76 | 3.5 | −6.0 |
| Turnout | | 2,155 | 35.8 | +6.4 |

West Central
| Party | Candidate | Votes | % | ±% |
|---|---|---|---|---|
| Conservative | Eric Cooper | 852 | 51.7 | +8.5 |
| Liberal Democrats | James Clarke | 681 | 41.3 | −7.8 |
| Labour | Christine Colman | 115 | 7.0 | −0.7 |
| Majority | | 171 | 10.4 | |
| Turnout | | 1,648 | 29.3 | +7.0 |

Wharfedale Moors
| Party | Candidate | Votes | % | ±% |
|---|---|---|---|---|
| Liberal Democrats | Richard Grange | 455 | 52.5 | |
| Conservative | Marcus Killick | 373 | 43.0 | |
| Labour | Patricia Foxall | 39 | 4.5 | |
| Majority | | 82 | 9.5 | |
| Turnout | | 867 | 49.9 | |
