= 1999 Maidstone Borough Council election =

1999 UK local government election

The 1999 Maidstone Borough Council election took place on 6 May 1999 to elect members of Maidstone Borough Council in Kent, England. One third of the council was up for election and the council stayed under no overall control.

After the election, the composition of the council was

- Liberal Democrat 22
- Conservative 15
- Labour 13
- Independent 5

== Election result ==
Overall turnout in the election was 26.2%.

Maidstone local election result 1999
Party	Seats	Gains	Losses	Net gain/loss	Seats %	Votes %	Votes	+/−
Conservative	6	1	0	+1	33.3	37.2	7,726	
Liberal Democrats	6	0	0	0	33.3	32.4	6,740	
Labour	5	0	1	-1	27.8	26.0	5,409	
Independent	1	0	0	0	5.6	3.5	735	
Green	0	0	0	0	0	0.9	184	

== Ward results ==
Allington
Party	Candidate	Votes	%	±%
Liberal Democrats	Malcolm Robertson	1,220	72.9	
Conservative	Angela Stainton-James	237	14.2	
Labour	Richard Coates	217	13.0	
Majority		983	58.7	
Turnout		1,674	29.7	
Liberal Democrats hold		Swing		

Bearsted
Party	Candidate	Votes	%	±%
Conservative	Gladys Haskett	1,077	67.1	
Labour	Jeanne Gibson	268	16.7	
Liberal Democrats	Sheila Chittenden	261	16.3	
Majority		809	50.4	
Turnout		1,606	32.2	
Conservative hold		Swing		

Bridge
Party	Candidate	Votes	%	±%
Labour	Roger Berriman	551	37.0	
Liberal Democrats	Sarah Gould	460	30.9	
Conservative	Brian Moss	420	28.2	
Green	Stephen Muggeridge	59	4.0	
Majority		91	6.1	
Turnout		1,490	22.8	
Labour hold		Swing		

East
Party	Candidate	Votes	%	±%
Liberal Democrats	Donal MacGrory	819	52.8	
Conservative	Susan Dishman	504	32.5	
Labour	Karen Forbes	229	14.8	
Majority		315	20.3	
Turnout		1,552	25.7	
Liberal Democrats hold		Swing		

Harrietsham and Lenham
Party	Candidate	Votes	%	±%
Labour	Tom Sams	762	46.2	
Conservative	Robert Waugh	628	38.1	
Liberal Democrats	Derek Haselup	202	12.2	
Independent	Leslie Parris	58	3.5	
Majority		134	8.1	
Turnout		1,650	38.8	
Labour hold		Swing		

Heath
Party	Candidate	Votes	%	±%
Liberal Democrats	Peter Hooper	665	50.8	
Labour	Anne Logan	315	24.0	
Conservative	Malcolm Parker	309	23.6	
Green	Ian McDonald	21	1.6	
Majority		350	26.7	
Turnout		1,310	22.3	
Liberal Democrats hold		Swing		

High Street
Party	Candidate	Votes	%	±%
Liberal Democrats	Frances Wilson	483	43.5	
Labour	Leonard Burfield	359	32.3	
Conservative	Valerie Parker	227	20.5	
Green	Sheila Kennedy	41	3.7	
Majority		124	11.2	
Turnout		1,110	24.5	
Liberal Democrats hold		Swing		

Hollingbourne
Party	Candidate	Votes	%	±%
Conservative	Tracey Warner	316	59.4	
Liberal Democrats	John Cobbett	184	34.6	
Labour	Stephen Gibson	32	6.0	
Majority		132	24.8	
Turnout		532	45.1	
Conservative hold		Swing		

Langley
Party	Candidate	Votes	%	±%
Independent	Frederick Winckless	677	77.2	
Conservative	Roy Streeter	122	13.9	
Labour	Ernest Small	78	8.9	
Majority		555	63.3	
Turnout		877	28.2	
Independent hold		Swing		

Leeds
Party	Candidate	Votes	%	±%
Conservative	Peter Parvin	484	76.3	
Labour	Elizabeth Stevens	150	23.7	
Majority		334	52.7	
Turnout		634	33.8	
Conservative hold		Swing		

Loose
Party	Candidate	Votes	%	±%
Liberal Democrats	Hugh Laing	289	56.2	
Conservative	Angharad Davies	177	34.4	
Labour	Susan Burfield	48	9.3	
Majority		112	21.8	
Turnout		514	27.2	
Liberal Democrats hold		Swing		

North
Party	Candidate	Votes	%	±%
Liberal Democrats	Tony Harwood	844	57.1	
Conservative	Derek Nicholson	434	29.4	
Labour	Rosemary Long	166	11.2	
Green	James Shalice	34	2.3	
Majority		410	27.7	
Turnout		1,478	25.8	
Liberal Democrats hold		Swing		

Park Wood
Party	Candidate	Votes	%	±%
Labour	Margaret Taylor	527	61.9	
Conservative	Simon Parvin	180	21.2	
Liberal Democrats	Shona Stevens	115	13.5	
Green	David Currer	29	3.4	
Majority		347	40.8	
Turnout		851	18.0	
Labour hold		Swing		

Shepway East
Party	Candidate	Votes	%	±%
Labour	Wendy Marlow	404	55.0	
Conservative	Peter Veal	172	23.4	
Liberal Democrats	Rodney Sterry	158	21.5	
Majority		232	31.6	
Turnout		734	16.6	
Labour hold		Swing		

Shepway West
Party	Candidate	Votes	%	±%
Labour	Julie Skinner	532	65.0	
Conservative	Claire Watts	287	35.0	
Majority		245	29.9	
Turnout		819	19.2	
Labour hold		Swing		

South
Party	Candidate	Votes	%	±%
Conservative	Theresa Stirk	766	43.3	
Liberal Democrats	Michael Williams	673	38.0	
Labour	Linda Wylie	330	18.7	
Majority		93	5.3	
Turnout		1,769	26.0	
Conservative gain from Labour		Swing		

Staplehurst
Party	Candidate	Votes	%	±%
Conservative	Eric Hotson	715	61.4	
Labour	Michael Casserley	239	20.5	
Liberal Democrats	Patricia Gerrish	210	18.0	
Majority		476	40.9	
Turnout		1,164	26.0	
Conservative hold		Swing		

Yalding
Party	Candidate	Votes	%	±%
Conservative	Roderick Nelson-Gracie	671	65.1	
Labour	Edith Davis	202	19.6	
Liberal Democrats	Graham Edy	157	15.2	
Majority		469	45.5	
Turnout		1,030	33.9	
Conservative hold		Swing		
