= 1999 Stroud District Council election =

1999 UK local government election

The 1999 Stroud Council election took place on 6 May 1999 to elect members of Stroud District Council in Gloucestershire, England. One third of the council was up for election and the council stayed under no overall control.

After the election, the composition of the council was

- Labour 24
- Conservative 17
- Liberal Democrat 5
- Independent 5
- Green 4

== Election result ==
The results saw Labour remain the largest party on the council, but the Conservatives gained 7 seats and no party had a majority.

Stroud local election result 1999
Party	Seats	Gains	Losses	Net gain/loss	Seats %	Votes %	Votes	+/−
Labour	8			-2	42.1			
Conservative	8			+7	42.1			
Liberal Democrats	1			-4	5.3			
Independent	1			-1	5.3			
Green	1			0	5.3			
