= 1999 Watford Borough Council election =

1999 UK local government election

Elections to Watford Borough Council were held on 6 May 1999. The whole council was up for election with boundary changes since the last election in 1998. The Labour party stayed in overall control of the council.

== Election result ==
1999 Watford Borough Council election
| Party | This election | | | Full council | | | This election | | |
| Party | Seats | Net | Seats % | Other | Total | Total % | Votes | Votes % | +/− |
|---|---|---|---|---|---|---|---|---|---|
| Labour | 19 | ▼2 | 52.8 | 0 | 19 | 52.8 | 22,539 | 37.9 | -1.2 |
| Liberal Democrats | 11 | ▲2 | 30.6 | 0 | 11 | 30.6 | 18,588 | 31.3 | -1.1 |
| Conservative | 6 | Steady | 16.7 | 0 | 6 | 16.7 | 18,337 | 30.8 | +2.3 |

== Ward results ==
=== Callowland ===
Callowland
| Party | Candidate | Votes | % |
|---|---|---|---|
| Labour | M. Cash | 628 | 48.0 |
| Labour | F. Hodgson | 605 | 46.3 |
| Labour | P. Harrison | 594 | 45.4 |
| Conservative | R. Downham | 421 | 32.2 |
| Conservative | T. Needham | 414 | 31.7 |
| Conservative | M. Taylor | 405 | 31.0 |
| Liberal Democrats | C. Bradshaw | 247 | 18.9 |
| Liberal Democrats | H. Finn | 229 | 17.5 |
| Liberal Democrats | A. Vincent | 198 | 15.1 |
| Turnout | | 1,307 | 26.5 |
| Labour hold | | | |
| Labour hold | | | |
| Labour hold | | | |

=== Central ===
Central
| Party | Candidate | Votes | % |
|---|---|---|---|
| Labour | R. Atkin | 856 | 46.2 |
| Labour | V. Muspratt | 799 | 43.1 |
| Liberal Democrats | R. Martins | 797 | 43.0 |
| Liberal Democrats | J. Baddeley | 754 | 40.7 |
| Liberal Democrats | K. Soodin | 731 | 39.5 |
| Labour | N. Tester | 725 | 39.1 |
| Conservative | A. Bell | 163 | 8.8 |
| Conservative | T. Parsons | 146 | 7.9 |
| Conservative | G. Ogden | 137 | 7.4 |
| Turnout | | 1,852 | 37.3 |
| Labour hold | | | |
| Labour hold | | | |
| Liberal Democrats gain from Labour | | | |

=== Holywell ===
Holywell
| Party | Candidate | Votes | % |
|---|---|---|---|
| Labour | R. Bell | 779 | 60.3 |
| Labour | S. Palmer | 761 | 58.9 |
| Labour | A. Head | 726 | 56.2 |
| Conservative | R. Frost | 247 | 19.1 |
| Conservative | H. Ling | 234 | 18.1 |
| Liberal Democrats | E. Watkin | 228 | 17.6 |
| Liberal Democrats | M. Allen | 228 | 17.6 |
| Liberal Democrats | P. Purdy | 223 | 17.3 |
| Conservative | A. Sander | 215 | 16.6 |
| Turnout | | 1,292 | 25.6 |
| Labour hold | | | |
| Labour hold | | | |
| Labour hold | | | |

=== Leggatts ===
Leggatts
| Party | Candidate | Votes | % |
|---|---|---|---|
| Labour | M. Green | 842 | 42.7 |
| Labour | K. Court | 841 | 42.6 |
| Conservative | S. O'Brien | 820 | 41.6 |
| Labour | E. Muspratt | 815 | 41.3 |
| Conservative | D. Hobbs | 789 | 40.0 |
| Conservative | G. Ling | 754 | 38.2 |
| Liberal Democrats | P. Brown | 257 | 13.0 |
| Liberal Democrats | S. Gibbard | 224 | 11.4 |
| Liberal Democrats | M. Taylor | 200 | 10.1 |
| Turnout | | 1,973 | 38.2 |
| Labour hold | | | |
| Labour hold | | | |
| Conservative hold | | | |

=== Meriden ===
Meriden
| Party | Candidate | Votes | % |
|---|---|---|---|
| Labour | N. Tyrwhitt | 819 | 50.2 |
| Labour | G. O'Connell | 812 | 49.8 |
| Labour | R. Banham | 802 | 49.2 |
| Conservative | K. Bell | 492 | 30.2 |
| Conservative | I. Evans | 457 | 28.0 |
| Conservative | P. East | 431 | 26.4 |
| Liberal Democrats | C. Anson | 251 | 15.4 |
| Liberal Democrats | M. Palmer | 224 | 13.7 |
| Liberal Democrats | J. Richmond | 215 | 13.2 |
| Turnout | | 1,631 | 30.2 |
| Labour hold | | | |
| Labour hold | | | |
| Labour hold | | | |

=== Nascot ===
Nascot
| Party | Candidate | Votes | % |
|---|---|---|---|
| Conservative | I. Brown | 1,005 | 55.3 |
| Conservative | J. Brown | 976 | 53.7 |
| Conservative | S. Jones | 963 | 53.0 |
| Labour | R. England | 380 | 20.9 |
| Labour | T. Meldrum | 378 | 20.8 |
| Liberal Democrats | M. Watkin | 376 | 20.7 |
| Labour | S. Hince | 371 | 20.4 |
| Liberal Democrats | J. Wyatt | 338 | 18.6 |
| Liberal Democrats | T. Wyatt | 291 | 16.0 |
| Turnout | | 1,816 | 36.1 |
| Conservative hold | | | |
| Conservative hold | | | |
| Conservative hold | | | |

=== Oxhey ===
Oxhey
| Party | Candidate | Votes | % |
|---|---|---|---|
| Liberal Democrats | D. Thornhill | 1,158 | 59.0 |
| Liberal Democrats | I. Sharpe | 1,068 | 54.4 |
| Liberal Democrats | A. Poole | 1,056 | 53.8 |
| Conservative | G. Greenstreet | 487 | 24.8 |
| Conservative | R. Bamford | 441 | 22.5 |
| Conservative | M. Stanley | 434 | 22.1 |
| Labour | S. Butler | 290 | 14.8 |
| Labour | N. Akubue | 278 | 14.2 |
| Labour | J. Dowdle | 265 | 13.5 |
| Turnout | | 1,964 | 41.8 |
| Liberal Democrats hold | | | |
| Liberal Democrats hold | | | |
| Liberal Democrats hold | | | |

=== Park ===
Park
| Party | Candidate | Votes | % |
|---|---|---|---|
| Conservative | K. Solomon | 1,214 | 60.0 |
| Conservative | T. Williams | 1,211 | 59.9 |
| Conservative | D. Wright | 1,180 | 58.3 |
| Liberal Democrats | M. Crowne | 477 | 23.6 |
| Liberal Democrats | C. de Vekey | 441 | 21.8 |
| Liberal Democrats | R. de Vekey | 406 | 20.1 |
| Labour | F. Hince | 293 | 14.5 |
| Labour | M. Jones | 277 | 13.7 |
| Labour | M. Hussain | 268 | 13.2 |
| Turnout | | 2,023 | 40.8 |
| Conservative hold | | | |
| Conservative hold | | | |
| Conservative hold | | | |

=== Stanborough ===
Stanborough
| Party | Candidate | Votes | % |
|---|---|---|---|
| Liberal Democrats | D. Scudder | 1,090 | 59.9 |
| Liberal Democrats | J. Richmond | 1,033 | 56.7 |
| Liberal Democrats | A. Wylie | 983 | 54.0 |
| Labour | C. Barry | 361 | 19.8 |
| Conservative | A. Jones | 357 | 19.6 |
| Conservative | P. Curtis | 356 | 19.5 |
| Labour | M. Tyrwhitt | 336 | 18.5 |
| Conservative | P. Jenkins | 334 | 18.3 |
| Labour | C. Wilson | 332 | 18.2 |
| Turnout | | 1,821 | 36.0 |
| Liberal Democrats hold | | | |
| Liberal Democrats hold | | | |
| Liberal Democrats hold | | | |

=== Tudor ===
Tudor
| Party | Candidate | Votes | % |
|---|---|---|---|
| Labour | S. Ahrens | 804 | 44.8 |
| Labour | S. Rosser | 787 | 43.9 |
| Labour | M. Chhina | 708 | 39.5 |
| Conservative | P. Bell | 661 | 36.8 |
| Conservative | S. Barclay | 647 | 36.1 |
| Conservative | J. Price | 626 | 34.9 |
| Liberal Democrats | A. Oaten | 274 | 15.3 |
| Liberal Democrats | L. Scudder | 271 | 15.1 |
| Liberal Democrats | D. Di Laura | 258 | 14.4 |
| Turnout | | 1,794 | 39.2 |
| Labour hold | | | |
| Labour hold | | | |
| Labour hold | | | |

=== Vicarage ===
Vicarage
| Party | Candidate | Votes | % |
|---|---|---|---|
| Labour | A. Choudhrey | 1,003 | 58.4 |
| Labour | B. Graham | 976 | 56.9 |
| Labour | G. Kelly | 944 | 55.0 |
| Conservative | D. Ealey | 301 | 17.5 |
| Liberal Democrats | N. Taylor | 301 | 17.5 |
| Conservative | J. Price | 264 | 15.4 |
| Liberal Democrats | I. Pitkin | 245 | 14.3 |
| Conservative | Z. Basit | 245 | 14.3 |
| Liberal Democrats | A. Zafar | 222 | 12.9 |
| Turnout | | 1,716 | 33.7 |
| Labour hold | | | |
| Labour hold | | | |
| Labour hold | | | |

=== Woodside ===
Woodside
| Party | Candidate | Votes | % |
|---|---|---|---|
| Liberal Democrats | A. Burtenshaw | 1,118 | 53.6 |
| Liberal Democrats | E. Burtenshaw | 1,112 | 53.3 |
| Liberal Democrats | A. Garside | 1,064 | 51.0 |
| Labour | S. Tuckwood | 714 | 34.2 |
| Labour | J. Young | 694 | 33.3 |
| Labour | M. Thackham | 676 | 32.4 |
| Conservative | C. Jeffs | 185 | 8.9 |
| Conservative | N. Joyce | 170 | 8.2 |
| Conservative | A. Needham | 155 | 7.4 |
| Turnout | | 2,085 | 40.6 |
| Liberal Democrats hold | | | |
| Liberal Democrats hold | | | |
| Liberal Democrats gain from Labour | | | |
