= 1999 Hyndburn Borough Council election =

1999 UK local government election

Elections to Hyndburn Borough Council were held on 6 May 1999. One third of the council was up for election and the Labour party lost overall control of the council to no overall control.

After the election, the composition of the council was:

- Labour 23
- Conservative 23
- Independent 1

== Election result ==
Hyndburn local election result 1999
Party	Seats	Gains	Losses	Net gain/loss	Seats %	Votes %	Votes	+/−
Conservative	23			+11	68.8			
Labour	23			-12	25.0			
Independent	1			+1	6.3			
