= 1999 Gloucester City Council election =

UK local election

The 1999 Gloucester City Council election took place on 5 May 1999 to elect members of Gloucester City Council in England. The council elected a third of the council and was controlled by the Labour Party.

== Results ==
Gloucester City Council election, 1999
Party	Seats	Gains	Losses	Net gain/loss	Seats %	Votes %	Votes	+/−
Labour	23							
Conservative	8							
Liberal Democrats	8							
Independent	0							
Other	0							

== Ward results ==
=== Barton ===
Barton 1999
Party	Candidate	Votes	%	±%
Labour	Ms. W. Rose	677	75.1	
Conservative	Proctor L.	150	16.6	
Liberal Democrats	K. Mitchell	75	8.3	
Turnout		4831		
Labour hold		Swing		

=== Eastgate ===
Eastgate 1999
Party	Candidate	Votes	%	±%
Labour	B. O'Neill	860	59.1	
Conservative	H. Harrison	329	22.6	
Liberal Democrats	Ms. B. Lush	267		
Turnout		5969	18.3	
Labour hold		Swing		

=== Kingsholm ===
Kingsholm 1999
Party	Candidate	Votes	%	±%
Conservative	P. Beer	1,294	55.6	
Liberal Democrats	D. Evans	602	25.9	
Labour	M. Ferguson	430	18.5	
Turnout		6408		
Conservative win (new seat)				

=== Linden ===
Linden 1999
Party	Candidate	Votes	%	±%
Labour	Ms. G. Gillespie	834	64.4	
Conservative	M. Richings	310	23.9	
Liberal Democrats	Ms. V. Wilcox	151	11.7	
Turnout		5248		
Labour win (new seat)				

=== Longlevens ===
Longlevens 1999
Party	Candidate	Votes	%	±%
Liberal Democrats	Ms. V. Phillips	1,216	44.4	
Labour	G. Dudley	851	31.1	
Conservative	S. McClung	669	24.5	
Turnout		5459		
Liberal Democrats hold		Swing		

=== Matson ===
Matson 1999
Party	Candidate	Votes	%	±%
Labour	S. McHale	674	66.6	
Conservative	M. Rentell	240	23.7	
Liberal Democrats	J. Trigg	98	9.7	
Turnout		5459		
Labour hold		Swing		

=== Podsmead ===
Podsmead (2) 1999
Party	Candidate	Votes	%	±%
Labour	C. Clarke	787	59.5	
Labour	J. Gill	689		
Conservative	K. Morgan	332	25.1	
Conservative	R. Cooke	321		
Liberal Democrats	C. Reed	204	15.4	
Liberal Democrats	Ms. E. Drinan	199		
Turnout		5631		
Labour hold		Swing		

=== Quedgeley ===
Quedgeley 1999
Party	Candidate	Votes	%	±%
Conservative	Ms. S. Lewis	995	55.9	
Labour	R. Price	445	25.0	
Liberal Democrats	W. Dewsnip	340	19.1	
Turnout		8049		
Conservative hold		Swing		

=== Tuffley ===
Tuffley 1999
Party	Candidate	Votes	%	±%
Labour	Ms. R. Onians	1,175	55.5	
Conservative	J. Armstrong	941	44.5	
Turnout		6062		
Labour hold		Swing		

=== Westgate ===
Westgate 1999
Party	Candidate	Votes	%	±%
Conservative	P. Munisamy	640	39.8	
Liberal Democrats	Ms. M. Champion	618	38.5	
Labour	B. Large	349	21.7	
Turnout		5160		
Conservative hold		Swing		
