= 1999 Swale Borough Council election =

1999 UK local government election

The 1999 Swale Borough Council election took place on 6 May 1999 to elect members of Swale Borough Council in Kent, England. One third of the council was up for election and the council remained under no overall control.

After the election, the composition of the council was

- Liberal Democrats 23
- Labour 17
- Conservative 9

== Election result ==
Swale local election result 1999
Party	Seats	Gains	Losses	Net gain/loss	Seats %	Votes %	Votes	+/−
Liberal Democrats	9			+1	50.0			
Conservative	5			+2	27.8			
Labour	4			-2	22.2			
Independent	0			-1	0			
