= 1999 Sedgefield Borough Council election =

1999 UK local government election

The 1999 Sedgefield Borough Council election to the Sedgefield Borough Council was held on 6 May 1999. The whole council was up for election and the Labour Party stayed in overall control of the council.

== Election result ==
Sedgefield local election result 1999
Party	Seats	Gains	Losses	Net gain/loss	Seats %	Votes %	Votes	+/−
Labour	43			-4	87.8			
Independent	3			+1	6.1			
Liberal Democrats	2			+2	4.1			
Others	1			+1	2.0			
