= 1999 Salford City Council election =

1999 UK local government election

Elections to Salford Council were held on 6 May 1999. One third of the council was up for election. The Labour Party kept overall control of the councill. Overall turnout was 21.85%.

After the election, the composition of the council was:

- Labour 56
- Liberal Democrat 4

== Election result ==
Salford local election result 1999
| Party | Seats | Gains | Losses | Net gain/loss | Seats % | Votes % | Votes | +/− |
|---|---|---|---|---|---|---|---|---|
| Labour | 18 | 0 | 1 | -1 | 90 | 59.1 | 21,332 | -2.4% |
| Liberal Democrats | 2 | 1 | 0 | +1 | 10 | 22.1 | 7,967 | +2.6% |
| Conservative | 0 | 0 | 0 | 0 | 0 | 18.7 | 6,741 | +0.0% |
| Public Transport Users | 0 | 0 | 0 | 0 | 0 | 0.2 | 62 | +0.2% |

== Ward results ==
Barton
| Party | Candidate | Votes | % | ±% |
|---|---|---|---|---|
| Labour | Beverley Collins | 1,173 | 73.5 | −3.8 |
| Conservative | Ruth Brook | 238 | 14.9 | +2.3 |
| Liberal Democrats | Peter Brown | 184 | 11.5 | +1.4 |
| Majority | | 935 | 58.6 | −6.1 |
| Turnout | | 1,595 | 20.4 | +2.2 |
| Labour hold | | Swing | | |

Blackfriars
| Party | Candidate | Votes | % | ±% |
|---|---|---|---|---|
| Labour | Benjamin Wallsworth | 694 | 75.2 | −3.5 |
| Liberal Democrats | Bernard Carson | 229 | 24.8 | +11.3 |
| Majority | | 465 | 50.4 | −14.8 |
| Turnout | | 923 | 15.8 | +2.3 |
| Labour hold | | Swing | | |

Broughton
| Party | Candidate | Votes | % | ±% |
|---|---|---|---|---|
| Labour | Bernard Murphy | 955 | 77.4 | +2.4 |
| Liberal Democrats | Sheilah Wallace | 279 | 22.6 | +10.5 |
| Majority | | 676 | 54.8 | −7.3 |
| Turnout | | 1,234 | 19.8 | +2.3 |
| Labour hold | | Swing | | |

Cadishead
| Party | Candidate | Votes | % | ±% |
|---|---|---|---|---|
| Labour | James Hunt | 993 | 58.1 | −3.8 |
| Conservative | Thomas Holt | 588 | 34.4 | +5.5 |
| Liberal Democrats | Yvonne Dippnall | 129 | 7.5 | −1.7 |
| Majority | | 405 | 23.7 | −9.3 |
| Turnout | | 1,710 | 26.1 | +4.6 |
| Labour hold | | Swing | | |

Claremont
| Party | Candidate | Votes | % | ±% |
|---|---|---|---|---|
| Liberal Democrats | Norman Owen | 1,114 | 43.1 | +6.9 |
| Labour | James Short | 1,071 | 41.5 | −5.0 |
| Conservative | Sydney Cooper | 397 | 15.4 | −1.9 |
| Majority | | 43 | 1.6 | |
| Turnout | | 2,582 | 26.3 | +4.8 |
| Liberal Democrats gain from Labour | | Swing | | |

Eccles
| Party | Candidate | Votes | % | ±% |
|---|---|---|---|---|
| Labour | Margaret Morris | 1,259 | 56.3 | −4.7 |
| Conservative | Michael Edwards | 618 | 27.6 | +6.1 |
| Liberal Democrats | Sara Bradbury | 359 | 16.1 | −1.5 |
| Majority | | 641 | 28.7 | −10.8 |
| Turnout | | 2,236 | 24.5 | +3.7 |
| Labour hold | | Swing | | |

Irlam
| Party | Candidate | Votes | % | ±% |
|---|---|---|---|---|
| Labour | John Jones | 1,112 | 61.7 | −18.6 |
| Conservative | Elizabeth Hill | 522 | 29.0 | +29.0 |
| Liberal Democrats | Julie Wenham | 167 | 9.3 | −10.4 |
| Majority | | 590 | 32.7 | −27.9 |
| Turnout | | 1,801 | 24.9 | +5.3 |
| Labour hold | | Swing | | |

Kersal
| Party | Candidate | Votes | % | ±% |
|---|---|---|---|---|
| Labour | George Wilson | 965 | 61.8 | −6.8 |
| Conservative | George Herrick | 390 | 25.0 | +0.4 |
| Liberal Democrats | John Gray | 207 | 13.3 | +6.5 |
| Majority | | 575 | 36.8 | −7.2 |
| Turnout | | 1,562 | 17.9 | −4.2 |
| Labour hold | | Swing | | |

Langworthy
| Party | Candidate | Votes | % | ±% |
|---|---|---|---|---|
| Labour | Andrew Leaston | 654 | 68.0 | −3.9 |
| Liberal Democrats | Emma Rogers | 308 | 32.0 | +19.9 |
| Majority | | 346 | 36.0 | −23.8 |
| Turnout | | 962 | 15.3 | +0.1 |
| Labour hold | | Swing | | |

Little Hulton
| Party | Candidate | Votes | % | ±% |
|---|---|---|---|---|
| Labour | Marion Wordsworth | 963 | 72.8 | |
| Conservative | Robert McHale | 209 | 15.8 | |
| Liberal Democrats | Edward Dippnall | 151 | 11.4 | |
| Majority | | 754 | 57.0 | |
| Turnout | | 1,323 | 17.5 | +0.5 |
| Labour hold | | Swing | | |

Ordsall
| Party | Candidate | Votes | % | ±% |
|---|---|---|---|---|
| Labour | Susan Miller | 594 | 78.0 | −5.2 |
| Liberal Democrats | Christopher Barnes | 168 | 22.0 | +13.4 |
| Majority | | 426 | 56.0 | −18.6 |
| Turnout | | 762 | 14.8 | +3.7 |
| Labour hold | | Swing | | |

Pendlebury
| Party | Candidate | Votes | % | ±% |
|---|---|---|---|---|
| Labour | Eric Burgoyne | 1,566 | 71.7 | −1.2 |
| Conservative | Marjorie Weston | 310 | 16.5 | +1.6 |
| Liberal Democrats | Valerie Gregory | 308 | 16.3 | +4.2 |
| Majority | | 1,258 | 55.2 | −2.8 |
| Turnout | | 2,184 | 20.7 | +1.7 |
| Labour hold | | Swing | | |

Pendleton
| Party | Candidate | Votes | % | ±% |
|---|---|---|---|---|
| Labour | John Warmisham | 1,002 | 74.2 | −1.6 |
| Liberal Democrats | Lynn Drake | 199 | 14.7 | +0.5 |
| Conservative | Hillary Lingard | 150 | 11.1 | +1.1 |
| Majority | | 803 | 59.5 | −2.1 |
| Turnout | | 1,351 | 19.2 | +3.2 |
| Labour hold | | Swing | | |

Swinton North
| Party | Candidate | Votes | % | ±% |
|---|---|---|---|---|
| Labour | James Dawson | 1,333 | 66.1 | −2.8 |
| Conservative | Neil Levay | 381 | 18.9 | +1.7 |
| Liberal Democrats | Nina Richards | 240 | 11.9 | −2.1 |
| Public Transport Users | Robin Polack | 62 | 3.1 | +3.1 |
| Majority | | 952 | 47.2 | −4.5 |
| Turnout | | 2,016 | 22.3 | +3.0 |
| Labour hold | | Swing | | |

Swinton South
| Party | Candidate | Votes | % | ±% |
|---|---|---|---|---|
| Labour | Douglas Daniels | 1,197 | 52.1 | +2.4 |
| Conservative | Christine Upton | 736 | 32.0 | −1.5 |
| Liberal Democrats | Paul Gregory | 366 | 15.9 | −1.0 |
| Majority | | 461 | 20.1 | +3.9 |
| Turnout | | 2,299 | 23.3 | +3.1 |
| Labour hold | | Swing | | |

Walkden North
| Party | Candidate | Votes | % | ±% |
|---|---|---|---|---|
| Labour | Vincent Devine | 1,426 | 83.0 | +3.6 |
| Liberal Democrats | Audrey Hunt | 292 | 17.0 | +7.0 |
| Majority | | 1,134 | 66.0 | −2.8 |
| Turnout | | 1,718 | 20.4 | +3.0 |
| Labour hold | | Swing | | |

Walkden South
| Party | Candidate | Votes | % | ±% |
|---|---|---|---|---|
| Labour | Audrey Judge | 1,424 | 54.2 | −0.5 |
| Conservative | John Mosley | 642 | 24.4 | −0.2 |
| Liberal Democrats | David Cowpe | 563 | 21.4 | +0.7 |
| Majority | | 782 | 29.8 | −0.3 |
| Turnout | | 2,629 | 21.8 | +1.8 |
| Labour hold | | Swing | | |

Weaste & Seedley
| Party | Candidate | Votes | % | ±% |
|---|---|---|---|---|
| Labour | Alan Clague | 1,014 | 61.8 | +5.5 |
| Liberal Democrats | Neville Rogers | 374 | 22.8 | −0.3 |
| Conservative | Wendy Powell | 254 | 15.5 | −5.1 |
| Majority | | 640 | 39.0 | +5.8 |
| Turnout | | 1,642 | 21.7 | −0.0 |
| Labour hold | | Swing | | |

Winton
| Party | Candidate | Votes | % | ±% |
|---|---|---|---|---|
| Labour | David Lancaster | 1,295 | 68.0 | −1.5 |
| Liberal Democrats | Susan Carson | 610 | 32.0 | +18.2 |
| Majority | | 685 | 36.0 | −16.8 |
| Turnout | | 1,905 | 20.8 | +3.6 |
| Labour hold | | Swing | | |

Worsley & Boothstown
| Party | Candidate | Votes | % | ±% |
|---|---|---|---|---|
| Liberal Democrats | Anthony Holt | 1,720 | 46.9 | −8.6 |
| Conservative | Karen Garrido | 1,306 | 35.6 | +8.1 |
| Labour | Ronald Carney | 642 | 17.5 | +0.5 |
| Majority | | 414 | 11.3 | −16.7 |
| Turnout | | 3,668 | 33.0 | +3.3 |
| Liberal Democrats hold | | Swing | | |
