= 1999 Worthing Borough Council election =

1999 UK local government election

The 1999 Worthing Borough Council election took place on 6 May 1999 to elect members of Worthing Borough Council in West Sussex, England. One third of the council was up for election and the Conservative Party gained overall control of the council from the Liberal Democrats. Overall turnout was 34.8%.

For the election the Conservative party leader William Hague visited the town as it was seen as an important target for the party. The mayor of Worthing had also defected from the Liberal Democrats and joined the Conservative party in the lead up to the election.

After the election, the composition of the council was:

- Conservative 20
- Liberal Democrat 16

== Election result ==
Worthing local election result 1999
Party	Seats	Gains	Losses	Net gain/loss	Seats %	Votes %	Votes	+/−
Conservative	8			+3	61.5	54.4		+3.0%
Liberal Democrats	5			-3	38.5	33.5		-3.6%
Labour	0			0	0	9.9		-0.6%
