= 1999 Bolsover District Council election =

1999 UK local government election

The 1999 Bolsover District Council election took place on 6 May 1999 to elect members of Bolsover District Council in Derbyshire, England. The whole council was up for election and the Labour Party stayed in overall control of the council.

== Election result ==
Bolsover local election result 1999
Party	Seats	Gains	Losses	Net gain/loss	Seats %	Votes %	Votes	+/−
Labour	32			-2	86.5			
Independent	4			+1	10.8			
Others	1			+1	2.7			
