= 1999 Broxbourne Borough Council election =

1999 UK local government election

The Broxbourne Council election, 1999 was held to elect council members of the Broxbourne Borough Council, the local government authority of the borough of Broxbourne, Hertfordshire, England.

== Composition of expiring seats before election ==
Old Ward	Party	Incumbent Elected	Incumbent	Standing again?	New Ward
Broxbourne	Conservative	1995	Joyce Ball	Yes	Broxbourne
Broxbourne	Conservative	1996	Peter Robinson	Yes	Broxbourne
Broxbourne	Conservative	1998	Donald Poole	Yes	Broxbourne
Bury Green	Labour	1995	Peter Bond	No	Not Applicable
Bury Green	Conservative	1996	Hazel Jackson	Yes	Bury Green
Bury Green	Conservative	1998	Dennis Clayton	Yes	Bury Green
Cheshunt Central	Conservative	1995	Michael Iszatt	Yes	Waltham Cross
Cheshunt Central	Conservative	1996	Milan Milovanovic	Yes	Cheshunt Central
Cheshunt Central	Conservative	1998	Sheila Kendall	Yes	Cheshunt Central
Cheshunt North	Labour	1995	Malcolm Theobald	Yes	Cheshunt North
Cheshunt North	Labour	1996	Richard Clark	Yes	Cheshunt North
Cheshunt North	Conservative	1998	Leonard Merry	Yes	Cheshunt North
Flamstead End	Conservative	1995	James Swannell	No	Not Applicable
Flamstead End	Conservative	1996	Edna Lazzari	Yes	Flamstead End
Flamstead End	Conservative	1998	Donald Smih	Yes	Flamstead End
Goffs Oak	Conservative	1996	Elizabeth Clayton	Yes	Goffs Oak
Goffs Oak	Conservative	1998	Marie Dowsett	Yes	Goffs Oak
Goffs Oak	Conservative	1998	Jacqueline De Pace	Yes	Goffs Oak
Hoddesdon North	Conservative	1995	Robert Groucott	Yes	Hoddesdon North
Hoddesdon North	Conservative	1996	Evelyn White	Yes	Hoddesdon North
Hoddesdon North	Conservative	1998	William Cooper	Yes	Hoddesdon North
Hoddesdon Town	Conservative	1995	Moyra O'Neill	No	Not Applicable
Hoddesdon Town	Conservative	1996	Kenneth Holliday	Yes	Hoddesdon Town
Hoddesdon Town	Conservative	1998	Kenneth Ayling	Yes	Hoddesdon Town
Rosedale	Conservative	1995	Paul Seeby	Yes	Rosedale
Rosedale	Conservative	1996	Darren Standing	No	Not Applicable
Rosedale	Conservative	1998	Amanda Hayward	Yes	Rosedale
Rye Park	Labour	1995	Neil Harvey	Yes	Rye Park
Rye Park	Labour	1996	Michael Malina	Yes	Theobalds
Rye Park	Conservative	1998	David Hale	Yes	Rye Park
Theobalds	Labour	1995	Richard Walsh	No	Not Applicable
Theobalds	Conservative	1996	Gordon Nicholson	Yes	Wormley Turnford
Theobalds	Conservative	1998	Dorothy Edmonds	Yes	Bury Green
Waltham Cross North	Conservative	1996	Francis Dolan	Yes	Theobalds
Waltham Cross North	Conservative	1997	Charles Tranham	Yes	Theobalds
Waltham Cross North	Conservative	1998	Norman Ames	Yes	Theobalds
Waltham Cross South	Labour	1995	Jean West	No	Not Applicable
Waltham Cross South	Labour	1996	Marios Kousoulou	Yes	Waltham Cross
Waltham Cross South	Labour	1998	Mark Farrington	Yes	Cheshunt North
Wormley Turnford	Labour	1995	Derrick Shiers	Yes	Wormley Turnford
Wormley Turnford	Labour	1996	Mary Howard	Yes	Rye Park
Wormley Turnford	Conservative	1998	Brian Hill	Yes	Wormley Turnford

== Election results ==
Broxbourne local election result 1999
Party	Seats	Gains	Losses	Net gain/loss	Seats %	Votes %	Votes	+/−
Conservative	33	33	0	+33	86.84			
Labour	5	5	0	+5	13.16			
Liberal Democrats	0	0	0	0	0			
Independent	0	0	0	0	0			

== Results summary ==
An "all out" election was held in 13 wards on 6 May 1999.

This was the first Borough election since the 1998 Boundary Commission report that had reduced the council size from 14 to 13 wards and from 42 to 38 Councillors.

12 wards returned 3 Councillors, the smaller Rosedale Ward returned 2 Councillors.

With the exception of Hoddesdon Town Ward all of the remaining wards had experienced boundary changes since the last election in 1998.

The political balance of the new council following this election was:

- Conservative 33 seats
- Labour 5 seats

The 5 seats won by Labour proved to be their largest representation achieved under the 1999 boundaries.

== Ward results ==
Broxbourne Ward Result 3 Seats 6 May 1999
Party	Candidate	Votes	%	±%
Conservative	Peter Robinson	765		
Conservative	Joyce Ball	759		
Conservative	Donald Poole	745		
Labour	Kathryn Symns	222		
Labour	Rachel Bates	213		
Labour	Sylvia Courtnage	208		
Liberal Democrats	Deborah Gibson	195		
Liberal Democrats	Peter Huse	165		
Liberal Democrats	Jeanette Roberts	158		
Turnout			23.70	

Bury Green Ward Result 3 Seats 6 May 1999
Party	Candidate	Votes	%	±%
Conservative	Hazel Jackson	907		
Conservative	Dennis Clayton	857		
Conservative	Dorothy Edmonds	830		
Labour	Carolyn Iles	416		
Labour	Janet Kousoulou	387		
Labour	Christopher Simonovitch	360		
Liberal Democrats	Patricia Blackshaw	145		
Independent	Christopher Stone	144		
Independent	Raymond Stone	125		
Turnout			30.70	

Cheshunt Central Ward Result 3 Seats 6 May 1999
Party	Candidate	Votes	%	±%
Conservative	Raymond Hannam	775		
Conservative	Sheila Kendall	758		
Conservative	Milan Milovanovic	750		
Labour	Edwin Bates	424		
Labour	James Emslie	378		
Labour	Cherry Robbins	366		
Liberal Democrats	Maureen Smith	267		
Liberal Democrats	Robert Smith	265		
Liberal Democrats	Julian Gould	235		
Turnout			26.60	

Cheshunt North Ward Result 3 Seats 6 May 1999
Party	Candidate	Votes	%	±%
Conservative	Leonard Merry	592		
Conservative	Kay Leese	585		
Labour	Mark Farrington	583		
Labour	Richard Clark	569		
Labour	Malcolm Theobald	563		
Conservative	Clair Sandell	548		
Liberal Democrats	Michael Gould	135		
Turnout			23.90	

Flamstead End Ward Result 3 Seats 6 May 1999
Party	Candidate	Votes	%	±%
Conservative	Edna Lazzari	713		
Conservative	Donald Hadley-Smith	705		
Conservative	David Manning	690		
Labour	David How	287		
Labour	Jacqueline Mawson-Murphy	268		
Labour	George Panayiotopoulos	230		
Liberal Democrats	Maria Garton	121		
Turnout			23.90	

Goffs Oak Ward Result 3 Seats 6 May 1999
Party	Candidate	Votes	%	±%
Conservative	Marie Dowsett	879		
Conservative	Elizabeth Clayton	846		
Conservative	Jacqueline De Pace	838		
Labour	Glenn Craig	214		
Liberal Democrats	Cynthia Appiah	159		
Turnout			24.50	

Hoddesdon North Result 3 Seats 6 May 1999
Party	Candidate	Votes	%	±%
Conservative	Robert Groucott	852		
Conservative	William Cooper	838		
Conservative	Evelyn White	832		
Labour	Robert Foskett	244		
Liberal Democrats	Anthony Fey	238		
Liberal Democrats	Eric Waughray	238		
Labour	James Maxey	226		
Liberal Democrats	Eric Few	220		
Turnout			26.00	

Hoddesdon Town Result 3 Seats 6 May 1999
Party	Candidate	Votes	%	±%
Conservative	Kenneth Holliday	700		
Conservative	Kenneth Ayling	673		
Conservative	John Rose	658		
Labour	Malcolm Aitken	325		
Labour	Timothy Kingston	286		
Liberal Democrats	James Mason	189		
Liberal Democrats	John Roberts	183		
Liberal Democrats	Lynda Tongue	176		
Turnout			23.80	

Rosedale Ward Result 2 Seats 6 May 1999
Party	Candidate	Votes	%	±%
Conservative	Amanda Hayward	329		
Conservative	Paul Seeby	328		
Labour	Richard Greenhill	229		
Labour	Allen Wallace	227		
Liberal Democrats	Priscilla Draper	122		
Liberal Democrats	Nicholas Garton	122		
Turnout			22.70	

Rye Park Ward Result 3 Seats 6 May 1999
Party	Candidate	Votes	%	±%
Conservative	David Hale	663		
Labour	Neil Harvey	593		
Conservative	Peter Swannell	586		
Conservative	Alan Smith	575		
Labour	Mary Howard	570		
Labour	Brian Mercer	508		
Liberal Democrats	Susan Piggott	101		
Liberal Democrats	Doreen Willis	87		
Liberal Democrats	Michael Winrow	76		
Turnout			28.70	

Theobalds Ward Result 3 Seats 6 May 1999
Party	Candidate	Votes	%	±%
Conservative	Norman Ames	916		
Conservative	Francis Dolan	910		
Conservative	Charles Tranham	889		
Labour	John Brown	403		
Labour	Ronald McCole	386		
Labour	Michael Malina	368		
Liberal Democrats	Henry Appiah	97		
Turnout			28.80	

Waltham Cross Ward Result 3 Seats 6 May 1999
Party	Candidate	Votes	%	±%
Labour	Alan McCole	583		
Labour	Linda Dambrauskas	555		
Labour	Marios Kousoulou	535		
Conservative	Francis Culley	324		
Conservative	Phyllis Seeby	302		
Conservative	Michael Iszatt	301		
Liberal Democrats	Neil Savage	96		
Liberal Democrats	Eithne Ormerod	78		
Turnout			21.20	

Wormley Turnford Ward Result 3 Seats 6 May 1999
Party	Candidate	Votes	%	±%
Conservative	Brian Hill	571		
Conservative	Gordon Nicholson	547		
Conservative	Paul Mason	538		
Labour	Marian Podlubny	370		
Labour	Peter Kort	364		
Labour	Derrick Shiers	343		
Liberal Democrats	Penelope Simmons	118		
Turnout			17.50	
