= 1999 Nuneaton and Bedworth Borough Council election =

1999 UK local government election

The 1999 Nuneaton and Bedworth Borough Council election to the Nuneaton and Bedworth Borough Council was held in May 1999. The Labour Party retained control of the council.

After the election, the composition of the council was:

- Labour 40
- Conservatives 5

== Election result ==
Nuneaton and Bedworth Council Election 1999
Party	Seats	Gains	Losses	Net gain/loss	Seats %	Votes %	Votes	+/−
Labour	40	0	1	-1				
Conservative	5	1	0	+1				
Liberal Democrats	0	0	0	0				
Liberal	0	0	0	0				
Independent	0	0	0	0				

== Ward results ==
Nuneaton and Bedworth Borough Council Elections 1999: Abbey Ward
Party	Candidate	Votes	%	±%
Labour	Annette McMaster	1123	69.5	
Conservative	R. Wikinson	248	15.4	
Liberal Democrats	B. Verden	244	15.1	
Majority				
Turnout				

Nuneaton and Bedworth Borough Council Elections 1999: Arbury Ward
Party	Candidate	Votes	%	±%
Labour	John Preedy	907	64.1	
Conservative	D. Bryden	308	21.8	
Liberal Democrats	F. Mills	199	14.1	
Majority				
Turnout				
