= 1999 Crawley Borough Council election =

1999 UK local government election

The 1999 Crawley Borough Council election took place on 6 May 1999 to elect members of Crawley Borough Council in West Sussex, England. One third of the council was up for election and the Labour Party stayed in overall control of the council.

After the election, the composition of the council was:

- Labour 25
- Conservative 5
- Liberal Democrats 2

== Election result ==
Labour kept a majority on the council with 25 seats, after winning 9 of the seats contested, but lost 2 seats to the Conservatives. One of the two gains came after Labour councillor Jacqui Weller and the Conservative candidate Ian Westwood both finished on 1,063 votes, with Ian Westwood successful after the 2 candidates drew lots.

Crawley local election result 1999
Party	Seats	Gains	Losses	Net gain/loss	Seats %	Votes %	Votes	+/−
Labour	9			-2	69.2			
Conservative	3			+2	23.1			
Liberal Democrats	1			0	7.7			
