= 1999 Guildford Borough Council election =

1999 UK local government election

The eighth full elections for Guildford Borough Council took place on 6 May 1999.

The Liberal Democrats had won control of the council in May 1995 with a majority of 1. However the first half of 1997 had seen the Liberal Democrats lose their majority as a result of three councillors (2 Stoughton councillors and 1 from Tongham) resigning from the party and a by election defeat in Merrow & Burpham ward.

Going into the election there were 19 Liberal Democrats, 14 Conservatives, 6 Labour and 6 independents. These 6 independents formed three distinct groups. There were 3 councillors for Ash and Tongham wards (two of whom were former Liberal Democrat councillors, one having resigned from the party in the 1991-95 session and one during the 1995-1999 session) who classed themselves as the "Independent Group". Two former Liberal Democrat councillors representing Stoughton ward classed themselves as Liberals. The councillor for Tillingbourne classed himself as an independent councillor.

The May 1999 election saw 20 Liberal Democrats, 17 Conservatives, 6 Labour and 2 Independents elected. The council remained hung.

The Liberal Democrats gained 1 net seat (3 losses and 4 gains) on the position they held going into the election. The Liberal Democrats lost 3 seats to the west of the borough, 2 in Ash ward and 1 in Normandy. The Liberal Democrats retook the Merrow & Burpham seat which they had lost to the Conservatives in a by election in May 1997, plus they retook the 2 Stoughton seats which they had lost to resignations in February 1997. The Liberal Democrats also gained Effingham ward from the Conservatives.

The Conservatives made 3 net gains (2 losses and 5 gains) on the position which they held going into the election. The Conservatives lost the Merrow & Burpham seat which they had taken in the May 1997 by election. The Conservative also lost Effingham to the Liberal Democrats. The Conservatives gained 2 Ash Vale seats from the Independent Group, plus they gained from the Liberal Democrats 3 of the other seats in the west of the borough, 2 in Ash and 1 in Normandy.

The Independent Group did not contest its 2 seats in Ash Vale. These were gained by the Conservatives. The one member of the Independent Group who did contest his seat held on to it in Tongham. Neither councillor belonging to the Liberal Group sought reelection in Stoughton and the Liberal Democrats regained these two seats.

Relative to 1995, the changes were not as dramatic as they were relative to the position going into the election. Overall there was a shift to the Conservatives in the Ash and Normandy region to the west of the borough, but much less change between the parties elsewhere in the borough. The Liberal Democrats lost all their remaining seats in the Ash, Tongham and Normandy region, having won all 7 of the seats there as recently as 1991. After the election the Ash, Tongham and Normandy area had 1 independent and 6 Conservative councillors. Elsewhere in the borough the only seat to change hands relative to 1995 was Effingham, where a Conservative marginal, was captured by the Liberal Democrats.

== Ward results ==
Ash (top 3 candidates elected)
| Party | Candidate | Votes | % | ±% |
|---|---|---|---|---|
| Conservative | John Ades | 1325 | | |
| Conservative | John Cassar | 1100 | | |
| Conservative | Nick Sutcliffe | 1009 | | |
| Liberal Democrats | Alan Hilliar | 901 | | |
| Liberal Democrats | Christine Frampton | 790 | | |
| Liberal Democrats | Peter Morgan | 725 | | |
| Labour | Kevin Jenkinson | 267 | | |
| Labour | Kazimierz Jaskinski | 237 | | |
| Labour | Donald Hirsch | 212 | | |
| Majority | | 108 | | |
| Turnout | | | 30.47 | |
| Conservative hold | | Swing | | |
| Conservative gain from Liberal Democrats | | Swing | | |
| Conservative gain from Liberal Democrats | | Swing | | |

Ash Vale (top 2 candidates elected)
| Party | Candidate | Votes | % | ±% |
|---|---|---|---|---|
| Conservative | Chris Lawson | 752 | | |
| Conservative | Marsha Moseley | 729 | | |
| Liberal Democrats | Denise Smith | 665 | | |
| Liberal Democrats | Geraldine Pettitt | 624 | | |
| Labour | Alex MacDonald | 124 | | |
| Labour | Brian Stace | 113 | | |
| Majority | | 64 | | |
| Turnout | | | 32 | |
| Conservative gain from Independent | | Swing | | |
| Conservative gain from Independent | | Swing | | |

Christchurch (top 2 candidates elected)
| Party | Candidate | Votes | % | ±% |
|---|---|---|---|---|
| Conservative | Andrew Hodges | 1102 | | |
| Liberal Democrats | Vivienne Johnson | 945 | | |
| Conservative | David Hunter | 912 | | |
| Liberal Democrats | Tom Sharp | 792 | | |
| Labour | Vijay Luthra | 126 | | |
| Labour | Carole Barber | 119 | | |
| Majority | | 33 | | |
| Turnout | | | 52.56 | |
| Conservative hold | | Swing | | |
| Liberal Democrats hold | | Swing | | |

Clandon & Horsley (top 3 candidates elected)
| Party | Candidate | Votes | % | ±% |
|---|---|---|---|---|
| Conservative | Jennifer Powell | 1705 | | |
| Conservative | Andrew French | 1604 | | |
| Conservative | Jennifer Wicks | 1568 | | |
| Liberal Democrats | Margaret Burnham | 404 | | |
| Liberal Democrats | Clive Wicks | 384 | | |
| Liberal Democrats | Philip Palmer | 340 | | |
| Labour | Meriel Beynon | 305 | | |
| Labour | Carolyn Fiddes | 274 | | |
| Labour | Julie Roxburgh | 253 | | |
| Majority | | 1164 | | |
| Turnout | | | 36.49 | |
| Conservative hold | | Swing | | |
| Conservative hold | | Swing | | |
| Conservative hold | | Swing | | |

Effingham (only 1 candidate elected)
| Party | Candidate | Votes | % | ±% |
|---|---|---|---|---|
| Liberal Democrats | Elizabeth Hogger | 573 | | |
| Conservative | Valerie Chapman | 459 | | |
| Labour | Carol Hayton | 25 | | |
| Majority | | 114 | | |
| Turnout | | | 53.47 | |
| Liberal Democrats gain from Conservative | | Swing | | |

Friary & St. Nicolas (top 3 candidates elected)
| Party | Candidate | Votes | % | ±% |
|---|---|---|---|---|
| Liberal Democrats | Richard Marks | 1226 | | |
| Liberal Democrats | Robert Blundell | 1224 | | |
| Liberal Democrats | David Goodwin | 1152 | | |
| Conservative | Mark Hoban | 454 | | |
| Conservative | Philip Hooper | 449 | | |
| Conservative | John Fairley | 442 | | |
| Labour | Tristan Brown | 320 | | |
| Labour | Helen Ayscough | 302 | | |
| Labour | Alexander Ayscough | 278 | | |
| Majority | | 698 | | |
| Turnout | | | 31.60 | |
| Liberal Democrats hold | | Swing | | |
| Liberal Democrats hold | | Swing | | |
| Liberal Democrats hold | | Swing | | |

Holy Trinity (top 2 candidates elected)
| Party | Candidate | Votes | % | ±% |
|---|---|---|---|---|
| Liberal Democrats | Tamsy Baker | 842 | | |
| Liberal Democrats | Gordon Bridger | 792 | | |
| Conservative | Sarah Creedy | 758 | | |
| Conservative | Peter Le Cheminant | 710 | | |
| Labour | Racheal Chesterton | 106 | | |
| Labour | Barry Hall | 105 | | |
| Majority | | 34 | | |
| Turnout | | | 36.9 | |
| Liberal Democrats hold | | Swing | | |
| Liberal Democrats hold | | Swing | | |

Lovelace (only 1 candidate elected)
| Party | Candidate | Votes | % | ±% |
|---|---|---|---|---|
| Conservative | Margaret Fenston | 558 | | |
| Labour | David Hide | 146 | | |
| Liberal Democrats | John Telfer | 104 | | |
| Majority | | 412 | | |
| Turnout | | | 44.06 | |
| Conservative hold | | Swing | | |

Merrow & Burpham (top 3 candidates elected)
| Party | Candidate | Votes | % | ±% |
|---|---|---|---|---|
| Liberal Democrats | Charles Shepperd | 2134 | | |
| Liberal Democrats | Andrew Allan | 2050 | | |
| Liberal Democrats | Anne Lee | 1960 | | |
| Conservative | Jennifer Jordan | 1628 | | |
| Conservative | Nicholas Brougham | 1600 | | |
| Conservative | Sheridan Westlake | 1576 | | |
| Labour | Malcolm Hill | 413 | | |
| Labour | William Scott | 367 | | |
| Labour | Mary Wu | 359 | | |
| Majority | | 332 | | |
| Turnout | | | 41.52 | |
| Liberal Democrats hold | | Swing | | |
| Liberal Democrats hold | | Swing | | |
| Liberal Democrats gain from Conservative | | Swing | | |

Normandy (only 1 candidate elected)
| Party | Candidate | Votes | % | ±% |
|---|---|---|---|---|
| Conservative | Diana Lockyer-Nibbs | 498 | | |
| Liberal Democrats | Robert Rendell | 454 | | |
| Labour | Peter Newmark | 61 | | |
| Majority | | 44 | | |
| Turnout | | | 43.09 | |
| Conservative gain from Liberal Democrats | | Swing | | |

Onslow (top 3 candidates elected)
| Party | Candidate | Votes | % | ±% |
|---|---|---|---|---|
| Liberal Democrats | Lynda Strudwick | 1046 | | |
| Liberal Democrats | Tony Phillips | 1003 | | |
| Liberal Democrats | Steven Freeman | 895 | | |
| Conservative | Bernard Parke | 847 | | |
| Conservative | Adrian Chandler | 746 | | |
| Conservative | Simon Anglim | 705 | | |
| Labour | Florence Flynn | 382 | | |
| Labour | Carmel Rogers | 358 | | |
| Labour | Raymond Rogers | 346 | | |
| Majority | | 48 | | |
| Turnout | | | 33.3 | |
| Liberal Democrats hold | | Swing | | |
| Liberal Democrats hold | | Swing | | |
| Liberal Democrats hold | | Swing | | |

Pilgrims (top 2 candidates elected)
| Party | Candidate | Votes | % | ±% |
|---|---|---|---|---|
| Conservative | Robert Rolfe | 700 | | |
| Conservative | Alan Dewhurst | 671 | | |
| Liberal Democrats | Marliyn Merryweather | 234 | | |
| Liberal Democrats | Peter Dyer | 222 | | |
| Labour | Elizabeth Bullock | 115 | | |
| Labour | Kathleen Parfitt | 100 | | |
| Majority | | 437 | | |
| Turnout | | | 34.93 | |
| Conservative hold | | Swing | | |
| Conservative hold | | Swing | | |

Pirbright (only 1 candidate elected)
| Party | Candidate | Votes | % | ±% |
|---|---|---|---|---|
| Conservative | Michael Nevins | 440 | | |
| Liberal Democrats | Mary Laker | 285 | | |
| Labour | Caroline Lloyd | 30 | | |
| Majority | | 155 | | |
| Turnout | | | 41.96 | |
| Conservative hold | | Swing | | |

Send (top 2 candidates elected)
| Party | Candidate | Votes | % | ±% |
|---|---|---|---|---|
| Conservative | Keith Taylor | 694 | | |
| Conservative | Jason Dobson | 611 | | |
| Liberal Democrats | Dee Appardurai | 349 | | |
| Liberal Democrats | Rupert Sheard | 334 | | |
| Labour | Benedict Marlow | 142 | | |
| Labour | Shelia Bean | 141 | | |
| Majority | | 262 | | |
| Turnout | | | 38.23 | |
| Conservative hold | | Swing | | |
| Conservative hold | | Swing | | |

Shalford (only 1 candidate elected)
| Party | Candidate | Votes | % | ±% |
|---|---|---|---|---|
| Conservative | Vasilis Kapsalis | 634 | | |
| Liberal Democrats | David Thomson | 501 | | |
| Labour | Michael Jeram | 169 | | |
| Majority | | 133 | | |
| Turnout | | | 43.52 | |
| Conservative hold | | Swing | | |

Stoke (top 3 candidates elected)
| Party | Candidate | Votes | % | ±% |
|---|---|---|---|---|
| Labour | Sallie Thornberry | 1091 | | |
| Labour | Keith Chesterton | 1057 | | |
| Labour | Angela Gunning | 1015 | | |
| Liberal Democrats | Alan Lawrence | 297 | | |
| Liberal Democrats | Stephen Wright | 294 | | |
| Liberal Democrats | William Plaskett | 267 | | |
| Conservative | Michael Dale | 258 | | |
| Conservative | David Quelch | 239 | | |
| Conservative | Paul Newman | 235 | | |
| Majority | | 718 | | |
| Turnout | | | 30.56 | |
| Labour hold | | Swing | | |
| Labour hold | | Swing | | |
| Labour hold | | Swing | | |

Stoughton (top 3 candidates elected)
| Party | Candidate | Votes | % | ±% |
|---|---|---|---|---|
| Liberal Democrats | Pauline Searle | 973 | | |
| Liberal Democrats | Jayne Marks | 965 | | |
| Liberal Democrats | Fiona White | 846 | | |
| Labour | Gary Hills | 540 | | |
| Labour | Stella Payne | 445 | | |
| Labour | Susan Pickering | 439 | | |
| Conservative | Roger Majoribanks | 358 | | |
| Conservative | Paul Johnson | 355 | | |
| Conservative | Caroline Newman | 338 | | |
| Majority | | 306 | | |
| Turnout | | | 27.3 | |
| Liberal Democrats hold | | Swing | | |
| Liberal Democrats gain from Independent | | Swing | | |
| Liberal Democrats gain from Independent | | Swing | | |

Tillingbourne (top 2 candidates elected)
| Party | Candidate | Votes | % | ±% |
|---|---|---|---|---|
| Independent | Keith Childs | 1144 | | |
| Liberal Democrats | Patricia Gumbrell | 904 | | |
| Conservative | John Foster | 848 | | |
| Labour | Edward Williams | 169 | | |
| Labour | James Farrell | 86 | | |
| Majority | | 56 | | |
| Turnout | | | 45.48 | |
| Independent hold | | Swing | | |
| Liberal Democrats hold | | Swing | | |

Tongham (only 1 candidate elected)
| Party | Candidate | Votes | % | ±% |
|---|---|---|---|---|
| Tongham Independent | Michael Pooley | 208 | | |
| Conservative | George Grundy | 182 | | |
| Liberal Democrats | Patricia Hughes | 123 | | |
| Labour | Frank Gunning | 62 | | |
| Majority | | 26 | | |
| Turnout | | | 33.21 | |
| Independent hold | | Swing | | |

Westborough (top 3 candidates elected)
| Party | Candidate | Votes | % | ±% |
|---|---|---|---|---|
| Labour | John Woodhatch | 954 | | |
| Labour | Peter Jennings | 826 | | |
| Labour | Joan O'Byrne | 822 | | |
| Liberal Democrats | Kenneth Briggs | 367 | | |
| Liberal Democrats | Andrew Bevan | 328 | | |
| Liberal Democrats | Joanna Hazelwood | 323 | | |
| Conservative | Mary Johns | 216 | | |
| Conservative | Barbara Dale | 213 | | |
| Conservative | Pamela Parke | 208 | | |
| Majority | | 455 | | |
| Turnout | | | 25.46 | |
| Labour hold | | Swing | | |
| Labour hold | | Swing | | |
| Labour hold | | Swing | | |

Worplesdon (top 3 candidates elected)
| Party | Candidate | Votes | % | ±% |
|---|---|---|---|---|
| Liberal Democrats | Terry King | 1256 | | |
| Liberal Democrats | Auriol Earle | 1207 | | |
| Liberal Democrats | Nigel Sutcliffe | 1192 | | |
| Conservative | Ken Johns | 739 | | |
| Conservative | Jonny Scriven | 713 | | |
| Conservative | Bev Thomas | 674 | | |
| Farmer Bob, Burpham Court Farm Conservationist | Bob Dearnley | 379 | | |
| Labour | Alan Ritchie | 224 | | |
| Labour | Ron Medlow | 189 | | |
| Labour | Saiful Islam | 158 | | |
| Majority | | 453 | | |
| Turnout | | | 38.2 | |
| Liberal Democrats hold | | Swing | | |
| Liberal Democrats hold | | Swing | | |
| Liberal Democrats hold | | Swing | | |
