= 1999 Mole Valley District Council election =

1999 UK local government election

Elections to Mole Valley District Council were held on 6 May 1999. One third of the council was up for election and the council stayed under no overall control.

After the election, the composition of the council was:

- Conservative 17
- Liberal Democrat 16
- Independent 7
- Labour 1

== Election results ==
Mole Valley local election result 1999
Party	Seats	Gains	Losses	Net gain/loss	Seats %	Votes %	Votes	+/−
Conservative	8			+3	57.1			
Liberal Democrats	4			0	28.6			
Independent	2			-2	14.3			
Labour	0			-1	0.0			
