= 1999 Havant Borough Council election =

1999 UK local government election

The 1999 Havant Borough Council election took place on 6 May 1999 to elect members of Havant Borough Council in Hampshire, England. One third of the council was up for election and the council stayed under no overall control.

After the election, the composition of the council was

- Conservative 16
- Liberal Democrats 11
- Labour 8
- Independent 3
- Liberal 1
- Others 3

== Election result ==
Havant local election result 1999
Party	Seats	Gains	Losses	Net gain/loss	Seats %	Votes %	Votes	+/−
Conservative	6			+2	42.9			
Labour	4			0	28.6			
Liberal Democrats	2			-2	14.3			
Independent	2			0	14.3			
