= 1999 Hartlepool Borough Council election =

1999 UK local government election

Elections to Hartlepool Borough Council in the ceremonial county of County Durham in England were held on 6 May 1999. One third of the council was up for election and the Labour Party stayed in overall control of the council. The results saw the Labour Party lose two seats to the Liberal Democrats and one seat to the Conservative Party. Overall turnout in the election was 26.1%.

Following the election the then council leader, Roy Waller, was challenged as leader of the Labour group on the council by Russell Hart. Hart defeated Waller 16 to 14 in a vote by Labour party councillors at the groups annual meeting and Hart thus became leader of the council.

After the election, the composition of the council was:

- Labour 30
- Liberal Democrat 10
- Conservative 6
- Independent 1

== Election result ==
Hartlepool local election result 1999
Party	Seats	Gains	Losses	Net gain/loss	Seats %	Votes %	Votes	+/−
Labour	10	0	3	-3	58.8	42.3	7,640	
Liberal Democrats	4	2	0	+2	23.5	33.8	6,112	
Conservative	2	1	0	+1	11.8	19.4	3,506	
Independent	1	0	0	0	5.9	3.9	710	
ITCOM	0	0	0	0	0.0	0.6	102	

== Ward results ==
Brinkburn
Party	Candidate	Votes	%	±%
Liberal Democrats	Andrew Ward	450	49.0	
Labour	Victor Burton	368	40.0	
Conservative	Catharina Burrell	101	11.0	
Majority		82	9.0	
Turnout		919		
Liberal Democrats gain from Labour		Swing		

Brus
Party	Candidate	Votes	%	±%
Labour	Sheila Griffin	466	61.2	
Liberal Democrats	Alan Bower	296	38.8	
Majority		170	22.4	
Turnout		762		
Labour hold		Swing		

Dyke House
Party	Candidate	Votes	%	±%
Labour	Jane Shaw	463	51.0	
Liberal Democrats	Reuben Atkinson	444	49.0	
Majority		19	2.0	
Turnout		907		
Labour hold		Swing		

Fens
Party	Candidate	Votes	%	±%
Liberal Democrats	Arthur Preece	842	65.1	
Labour	George English	363	28.1	
Conservative	David Holmes	89	6.9	
Majority		479	37.0	
Turnout		1,294		
Liberal Democrats hold		Swing		

Grange
Party	Candidate	Votes	%	±%
Conservative	Frank Rogers	704	52.0	
Labour	Anthony Coverdale	465	34.3	
Liberal Democrats	Sheila Bruce	185	13.7	
Majority		239		
Turnout		1,354		
Conservative hold		Swing		

Greatham
Party	Candidate	Votes	%	±%
Labour	Maureen Goosey	277	46.6	
Liberal Democrats	Patricia Rayner	203	34.2	
Conservative	Daphne Morris	114	19.2	
Majority		74	12.4	
Turnout		594		
Labour hold		Swing		

Hart
Party	Candidate	Votes	%	±%
Liberal Democrats	Edna Wright	721	62.3	
Labour	John Price	323	27.9	
Conservative	Nicholaas Young	113	9.8	
Majority		398	34.4	
Turnout		1,157		
Liberal Democrats hold		Swing		

Jackson
Party	Candidate	Votes	%	±%
Labour	Moss Boddy	419	56.5	
Liberal Democrats	William Roberts	185	25.0	
Conservative	Lee Burrell	137	18.5	
Majority		234	31.5	
Turnout		741		
Labour hold		Swing		

Owton
Party	Candidate	Votes	%	±%
Labour	Margaret Watson	433	67.3	
Liberal Democrats	Robert McPartlin	210	32.7	
Majority		223	44.6	
Turnout		643		
Labour hold		Swing		

Park
Party	Candidate	Votes	%	±%
Conservative	William Coward	710	45.9	
Labour	Alison Lilley	646	41.8	
Liberal Democrats	Thomas Snowdon	191	12.3	
Majority		64	4.1	
Turnout		1,547		
Conservative gain from Labour		Swing		

Rift House
Party	Candidate	Votes	%	±%
Labour	Kenneth Clark	591	47.4	
Liberal Democrats	Raymond Herbert	331	26.5	
Conservative	Josephine Reay	325	26.1	
Majority		280	20.9	
Turnout		1,247		
Labour hold		Swing		

Rossmere
Party	Candidate	Votes	%	±%
Labour	John Hart	724	67.4	
Liberal Democrats	Howard Smith	271	25.2	
Conservative	Sharon Jeffries	79	7.4	
Majority		453	42.2	
Turnout		1,074		
Labour hold		Swing		

St Hilda
Party	Candidate	Votes	%	±%
Liberal Democrats	John Marshall	813	55.1	
Labour	Alice Savage	560	38.0	
ITCOM	Mary Power	102	6.9	
Majority		253	17.1	
Turnout		1,475		
Liberal Democrats gain from Labour		Swing		

Seaton (2)
Party	Candidate	Votes	%	±%
Independent	Catherine Hill	546		
Labour	Michael Turner	522		
Conservative	Gerald Hartley	457		
Conservative	Stanley Fortune	347		
Liberal Democrats	Margaret Cain	298		
Liberal Democrats	David Youngson	268		
Turnout		2,438		
Independent hold		Swing		
Labour hold		Swing		

Stranton
Party	Candidate	Votes	%	±%
Labour	Lillian Sutheran	469	55.0	
Liberal Democrats	Christopher Snowdon	237	27.8	
Conservative	Jessie Young	82	9.6	
Independent	Gerald Parker	65	7.6	
Majority		232	27.2	
Turnout		853		
Labour hold		Swing		

Throston
Party	Candidate	Votes	%	±%
Labour	Harry Clouth	551	51.7	
Conservative	Simeon Reay	248	23.3	
Liberal Democrats	Peter Whitham	167	15.7	
Independent	Edward Powell	99	9.3	
Majority		303	28.4	
Turnout		1,065		
Labour hold		Swing		
