= 1999 Scottish local elections =

- 6 May 1999

All 1,222 seats to Scottish councils
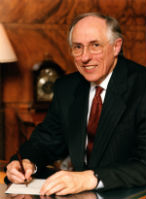

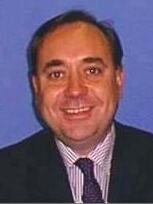

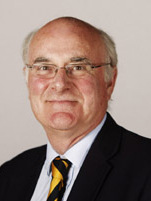

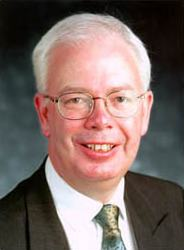
	First party	Second party
Leader	Donald Dewar	Alex Salmond
Party	Labour	SNP
Leader since	19 September 1998	22 September 1990
Seats won	550	204
Seat change	▼63	▲23
Popular vote	829,921	655,299
Percentage	36.6%	28.7%
Swing	▼7.0%	▲2.6%
	Third party	Fourth party
Leader	David McLetchie	Jim Wallace
Party	Conservative	Liberal Democrats
Leader since	6 September 1998	18 April 1992
Seats won	108	156
Seat change	▲26	▲35
Popular vote	308,170	289,236
Percentage	13.5%	12.7%
Swing	▲2.0%	▲2.9%
- Colours denote the winning party with outright control

Local elections were held in Scotland on 6 May 1999, the same day as First Scottish Parliament elections. It was the second election for all 32 Scottish councils and the first after a major review into all wards.

== Boundary changes ==
A Major review of all boundaries took place before the 1999 elections as part of the third comprehensive review by the independent Local Government Boundary Commission for Scotland which resulted in an overall reduction of wards to 1222 instead of 1245 and many wards were restructured.

NOT a full list:

- Aberdeen Lost 7 seats
- Aberdeenshire Gained :
- Argyll & Bute Gained
- Dumfries & Galloway Lost
- Falkirk Lost 4 seats:
- Fife lost 12 seats.
- Glasgow lost 4 seats.

== Results ==
Summary of the 1999 Scottish council election results
Parties	Votes	Votes %	Wards	Wards %	Net Gain/Loss
Labour	829,921	36.6	550	45.0	
SNP	655,299	28.7	204	16.7	
Liberal Democrats	289,236	12.7	156	12.8	
Conservative	308,170	13.5	108	8.8	
Independent	172,297	7.5	191	16.0	
Other	30,342	1.0	9	0.7	
Total	2,285,345	n/a	1,222	n/a	n/a

- Voter turnout: 59.1%

== Councils ==
Council	1995 result	Control before election (if different)	1999 result	Details
Aberdeen City	Labour		Labour	Details
Aberdeenshire	No overall control		No overall control	Details
Angus	SNP		SNP	Details
Argyll and Bute	Independent		Independent	Details
Clackmannanshire	Labour		No overall control	Details
Dumfries and Galloway	Labour		Labour	Details
Dundee City	Labour		No overall control	Details
East Ayrshire	Labour		Labour	Details
East Dunbartonshire	Labour	NOC	No overall control	Details
East Lothian	Labour		Labour	Details
East Renfrewshire	No overall control		No overall control	Details
City of Edinburgh	Labour		Labour	Details
Falkirk	Labour		No overall control	Details
Fife	Labour		Labour	Details
Glasgow City	Labour		Labour	Details
Highland	Independent		Independent	Details
Inverclyde	Labour		Labour	Details
Midlothian	Labour		Labour	Details
Moray	SNP		No overall control	Details
Na h-Eileanan Siar	Independent		Independent	Details
North Ayrshire	Labour		Labour	Details
North Lanarkshire	Labour		Labour	Details
Orkney	Independent		Independent	Details
Perth and Kinross	SNP	NOC	No overall control	Details
Renfrewshire	No overall control	NOC	Labour	Details
Scottish Borders	No overall control		No overall control	Details
Shetland	Independent		Independent	Details
South Ayrshire	Labour		Labour	Details
South Lanarkshire	Labour		Labour	Details
Stirling	Labour	NOC	No overall control (Lab minority)	Details
West Dunbartonshire	Labour		Labour	Details
West Lothian	Labour		Labour	Details

== See also ==
- Wayback Machine Detail report into the elections
- Scottish Boundary Commission | he Boundary Commission for Scotland is responsible for reviews of UK Parliament constituencies in Scotland. Review of the Third Statutory Reviews of Electoral Arrangements which took place between 1996 and 1998.
- LGC Elections Centre More details about 1999 elections.
- BBC News | Elections | Locals 99 | | State of the Parties
