= 1999 Moray Council election =

1999 Scottish local government election

- 6 May 1999

All 26 seats to Moray Council 14 seats needed for a majority
- Registered: 65,353
- Turnout: 56.0%
	First party	Second party	Third party
Party	Independent	Labour	SNP
Last election	2 seats, 19.8%	3 seats, 19.7%	13 seats, 50.2%
Seats won	15	6	2
Seat change	▲13	▲3	▼11
Popular vote	13,504	7,514	11,147
Percentage	36.9%	20.5%	30.4%
Swing	▲17.1%	▲0.8%	▼19.8%
	Fourth party	Fifth party
Party	Liberal Democrats	Conservative
Last election	0 seats, 8.1%	0 seats, 2.2%
Seats won	2	1
Seat change	▲2	▲1
Popular vote	3,052	1,405
Percentage	8.3%	3.8%
Swing	▲0.2%	▲1.6%
- Map of ward results

- Council composition following the election
Convener before election
Gordon McDonald
SNP
Elected Convener
Edward Aldridge
Independent

Elections to Moray Council were held on 6 May 1999, on the same day as the other Scottish local government elections. This was the second election to the unitary council following the implementation of the Local Government etc. (Scotland) Act 1994.

The election used the 26 wards created by the Third Statutory Reviews of Electoral Arrangements in 1998. Each ward elected one councillor using first-past-the-post voting.

The Scottish National Party (SNP) lost 11 of their 13 seats, including losses for SNP group leader councillor Gordon Crawford and convener of the Moray Council councillor Gordon McDonald. As a result, 14 independent and the 6 Labour councillors agreed to form a coalition, with independent councillor Edward Aldridge elected as the convener of the Moray Council.

== Background ==
The 1995 election to the Moray Council saw the SNP take 13 seats, and therefore the SNP were able to form a majority administration as the council only had 18 seats at that time.

1995 Moray Council election results
Party	Seats	Vote share
SNP	13	50.2%
Labour	3	19.7%
Independent	2	19.8%

== Results ==
1999 Moray Council election result
Party	Seats	Gains	Losses	Net gain/loss	Seats %	Votes %	Votes	+/−
Independent	15			▲13	57.7	36.9	13,504	▲17.1
Labour	6			▲3	23.1	20.5	7,514	▲0.8
SNP	2			▼11	7.7	30.4	11,147	▼19.8
Liberal Democrats	2			▲2	7.7	8.3	3,052	▲0.2
Conservative	1			▲1	3.8	3.8	1,405	▲1.6

== Ward results ==
=== Buckie Central ===
Party	Candidate	Votes	%
Labour	J Leslie	781	59.6
SNP	G McDonald (Incumbent)	530	40.4
Majority		251	19.1
Turnout		1,311	53.7
Labour win (new seat)			

=== Buckie East & Findochty ===
Party	Candidate	Votes	%
Independent	S Longmore	507	36.4
SNP	L McDonald	430	30.9
Labour	D Wild	307	22.1
Liberal Democrats	G Holm	147	10.6
Majority		77	5.5
Turnout		1,391	54.9
Independent win (new seat)			

=== Buckie West ===
Party	Candidate	Votes	%
Independent	W Jappy (Incumbent)	549	37.7
SNP	K McKay	455	31.2
Labour	J MacKay	454	31.1
Majority		94	6.4
Turnout		1,458	56.8
Independent win (new seat)			

=== Burghsea ===
Party	Candidate	Votes	%
Liberal Democrats	G Towns	593	38.0
Independent	C Millar	408	26.1
SNP	W Clark	349	22.3
Independent	D Scaife (Incumbent)	212	13.6
Majority		185	11.8
Turnout		1,562	61.7
Liberal Democrats win (new seat)			

=== Cathedral ===
Party	Candidate	Votes	%
Labour	A Farquharson (Incumbent)	830	71.7
SNP	M Hardie	328	28.3
Majority		502	43.4
Turnout		1,158	45.4
Labour win (new seat)			

=== Central West ===
Party	Candidate	Votes	%
Independent	A Bisset	1,380	85.8
SNP	H McDonald (Incumbent)	228	14.2
Majority		1,152	71.6
Turnout		1,608	61.4
Independent win (new seat)			

=== Elgin-Bishopmill East ===
Party	Candidate	Votes	%
Labour	A Keith (Incumbent)	1,047	71.2
SNP	B Ewan	423	28.8
Majority		624	42.4
Turnout		1,470	57.3
Labour win (new seat)			

=== Elgin-Bishopmill West ===
Party	Candidate	Votes	%
Labour	A Burgess	794	53.9
Liberal Democrats	E Cameron	395	26.8
SNP	J Sharp	285	19.3
Majority		399	27.1
Turnout		1,474	60.0
Labour win (new seat)			

=== Fife-Keith & Strathisla ===
Party	Candidate	Votes	%
Independent	W Watt	528	36.2
SNP	R Patterson (Incumbent)	423	29.0
Liberal Democrats	G Duncan	289	19.8
Labour	F Copland	220	15.1
Majority		105	7.2
Turnout		1,460	58.4
Independent win (new seat)			

=== Finderne ===
Party	Candidate	Votes	%
Independent	R Gregory	610	47.8
SNP	R Laing (Incumbent)	346	27.1
Conservative	E Emerson	319	25.0
Majority		264	20.7
Turnout		1,275	51.9
Independent win (new seat)			

=== Forres Central ===
Party	Candidate	Votes	%
Independent	R McIntosh	1,033	72.5
SNP	G MacDonald	392	27.5
Majority		641	45.0
Turnout		1,425	53.7
Independent win (new seat)			

=== Forres East ===
Party	Candidate	Votes	%
Conservative	I Young	547	34.9
SNP	J Dingwall	365	22.3
Independent	D Black	345	22.0
Independent	F Villani	312	19.9
Majority		182	11.6
Turnout		1,569	61.5
Conservative win (new seat)			

=== Forres West & Altyre ===
Party	Candidate	Votes	%
Independent	A Urquhart	700	63.2
SNP	M Whyte	407	36.8
Majority		293	26.5
Turnout		1,107	49.1
Independent win (new seat)			

=== Glenlivet ===
Party	Candidate	Votes	%
Independent	A Wilson	773	57.7
SNP	M MacConachie	566	42.3
Majority		207	15.5
Turnout		1,339	55.0
Independent win (new seat)			

=== Heldon & Laich ===
Party	Candidate	Votes	%
Independent	J Hogg	492	34.5
Independent	G Mackessack-Leitch	464	32.5
SNP	W Stewart	308	21.6
Liberal Democrats	E Kellock	164	11.5
Majority		28	2.0
Turnout		1,428	61.0
Independent win (new seat)			

=== Innes ===
Party	Candidate	Votes	%
Independent	A Coutts	538	33.5
Labour	C Heathcote	388	24.2
SNP	M Howe (Incumbent)	379	23.6
Liberal Democrats	P Cromar	300	18.7
Majority		150	9.3
Turnout		1,605	62.1
Independent win (new seat)			

=== Keith ===
Party	Candidate	Votes	%
Liberal Democrats	L Gorn	633	45.1
SNP	D Barr	467	33.3
Labour	P Mann (Incumbent)	303	21.6
Majority		166	11.8
Turnout		1,403	57.4
Liberal Democrats win (new seat)			

=== Lennox ===
Party	Candidate	Votes	%
SNP	T Howe (Incumbent)	584	39.0
Conservative	C Findlay	539	36.0
Liberal Democrats	J Milton	373	24.9
Majority		45	3.0
Turnout		1,496	65.1
SNP win (new seat)			

=== Lhanbryde & Birnie ===
Party	Candidate	Votes	%
Independent	J Shaw (Incumbent)	727	53.5
SNP	I Hamilton	310	22.8
Labour	C Hamilton	164	12.1
Liberal Democrats	D Cameron	158	11.6
Majority		417	30.7
Turnout		1,359	57.2
Independent win (new seat)			

=== Lossiemouth East ===
Party	Candidate	Votes	%
Independent	A Fleming	1,023	71.4
SNP	D Crawford (Incumbent)	409	28.6
Majority		614	42.9
Turnout		1,432	57.5
Independent win (new seat)			

=== Lossiemouth West ===
Party	Candidate	Votes	%
Independent	W Flynn	809	62.2
SNP	J Stewart (Incumbent)	492	37.8
Majority		317	24.4
Turnout		1,301	52.0
Independent win (new seat)			

=== New Elgin East ===
Party	Candidate	Votes	%
Labour	J Divers	897	65.5
SNP	M Anderson (Incumbent)	473	34.5
Majority		424	30.9
Turnout		1,370	53.5
Labour win (new seat)			

=== New Elgin West ===
Party	Candidate	Votes	%
Labour	M Ettles	804	57.4
SNP	R Burns	596	42.6
Majority		208	14.9
Turnout		1,400	52.4
Labour win (new seat)			

=== Rathford ===
Party	Candidate	Votes	%
Independent	R Shepard	853	63.6
SNP	M Manson	489	36.4
Majority		364	27.1
Turnout		1,342	54.0
Independent win (new seat)			

=== Rural Keith & Rothes ===
Party	Candidate	Votes	%
SNP	P Paul	763	59.2
Labour	P Radtke	525	40.8
Majority		238	18.5
Turnout		1,288	57.8
SNP win (new seat)			

=== Speyside ===
Party	Candidate	Votes	%
Independent	E Aldridge (Incumbent)	1,241	78.0
SNP	K Braithwaite	350	22.0
Majority		891	56.0
Turnout		1,591	63.4
Independent win (new seat)			

== Aftermath ==
The Scottish National Party (SNP) lost 11 of their 13 seats, including losses for SNP group leader councillor Gordon Crawford and convener of the Moray Council councillor Gordon McDonald. As a result, 14 independent and the 6 Labour councillors agreed to form a coalition, with independent councillor Edward Aldridge elected as the convener of the Moray Council.
