= 1999 Argyll and Bute Council election =

1999 Scottish local government election

← 1995	6 May 1999	2003 →

All 36 seats to Argyll and Bute Council 19 seats needed for a majority
	First party	Second party	Third party
Party	Independent	Liberal Democrats	SNP
Last election	21	3	4
Seats won	20	6	5
Seat change	▼1	▲3	▲1
Popular vote	17,559	8,315	6,424
Percentage	43.2%	20.5%	15.8%
Swing	▼6.9%	▲6.4%	▲3.2%
	Fourth party	Fifth party
Party	Conservative	Labour
Last election	3	2
Seats won	4	1
Seat change	▲1	▼1
Popular vote	4,344	4,012
Percentage	10.7%	9.9%
Swing	▼2.3%	▼0.2%
- Results by ward
Council Leader before election
Dick Walsh
Independent
Council Leader
Alison Hay
Liberal Democrats

The 1999 elections to Argyll and Bute Council were held on the 6 May 1999 and were the second for the unitary authority, which was created under the Local Government etc (Scotland) Act 1994 and replaced the previous two-tier system of local government under Strathclyde Regional Council and Dumbarton and Argyll & Bute District Councils. It was held on the same day as the first Scottish Parliament election and resulted in no change to the administration of the council - independent control.

== Election results ==
Argyll and Bute local election results 1999
Party	Seats	Gains	Losses	Net gain/loss	Seats %	Votes %	Votes	+/−
Independent	20	0	1	▼1	55.6	43.2	17,559	▼6.9
Liberal Democrats	6	4	1	▲3	16.7	15.8	6,424	▲6.4
SNP	5	3	2	▲1	13.9	20.5	8,315	▲3.2
Conservative	4	3	2	▲1	11.1	10.7	4,344	▼2.3
Labour	1	1	2	▼1	2.8	9.9	4,012	▼0.2
Faslane Peace	0	0	0	0	0.0	0.3	129	New

== Ward results ==
Ward 1: South Kintyre
Party	Candidate	Votes	%
Conservative	A McCallum	269	20.8
Labour	A Wilson	224	17.3
SNP	A Cowan	219	16.9
Independent	J MacLean	219	16.9
Independent	W Bell	184	14.2
Liberal Democrats	J McKerral	178	13.8
Majority		45	3.5
Turnout		1,293	65.9
Conservative hold			

Ward 2: Campbeltown Central
Party	Candidate	Votes	%
Independent	A McKinlay	699	53.3
Labour	G MacMillan	401	30.6
SNP	D McIntyre	211	16.1
Majority		298	22.7
Turnout		1,311	61.5
Independent win (new seat)			

Ward 3: East Central Kintyre
Party	Candidate	Votes	%
Independent	T A Blair	460	34.4
Labour	I McMillan	378	28.2
Liberal Democrats	T J Oxborrow	253	18.9
SNP	A J MacLellan	247	18.5
Majority		82	6.2
Turnout		1,338	63.0
Independent gain from Conservative			

Ward 4: North and West Kintyre
Party	Candidate	Votes	%
Independent	D McKinnon	514	38.5
Liberal Democrats	D Robertson	379	28.4
SNP	A Horn	261	19.6
Conservative	A McNeill	180	13.5
Majority		135	10.1
Turnout		1,334	67.6
Independent hold			

Ward 5: Knapdale
Party	Candidate	Votes	%
Independent	B Robertson	580	43.9
Labour	D Philand	421	31.9
SNP	A M Johnston	211	16.0
Conservative	W C C Duncan	108	8.2
Majority		159	12.0
Turnout		1,320	69.9
Independent hold			

Ward 6: Lochgilphead
Party	Candidate	Votes	%
Independent	D MacMillan	646	49.3
Labour	B Grunewald	552	42.1
Conservative	H W M D Service	113	8.6
Majority		94	7.2
Turnout		1,311	65.2
Independent hold			

Ward 7: Craignish - Glenaray
Party	Candidate	Votes	%
Liberal Democrats	A J Hay	1,049	77.6
Conservative	V J Cox	214	15.8
Faslane Peace	S Cox	89	6.6
Majority		835	61.8
Turnout		1,352	68.3
Liberal Democrats hold			

Ward 8: Islay North, Jura and Colonsay
Party	Candidate	Votes	%
Liberal Democrats	R Currie	Unopposed	N/A
Liberal Democrats hold			

Ward 9: Islay South
Party	Candidate	Votes	%
Independent	J M R Findlay	Unopposed	N/A
Independent gain from Independent			

Ward 10: Awe
Party	Candidate	Votes	%
Independent	A Macaskill	755	62.7
SNP	R Johnston	450	37.3
Majority		305	25.4
Turnout		1,205	66.7
Independent hold			

Ward 11: Oban North
Party	Candidate	Votes	%
Independent	D Webster	455	40.2
SNP	K MacColl	357	31.5
Independent	D MacKenzie	198	17.5
Conservative	K F M Oxland	123	10.9
Majority		98	8.7
Turnout		1,133	58.5
Independent hold			

Ward 12: Oban Central
Party	Candidate	Votes	%
Independent	R Banks	650	58.1
Liberal Democrats	W R Shaw	327	29.3
Conservative	E M Kilpatrick	141	12.6
Majority		323	28.8
Turnout		1,118	56.3
Independent hold			

Ward 13: Oban South
Party	Candidate	Votes	%
SNP	D McIntosh	572	51.3
Liberal Democrats	A McKie	544	48.7
Majority		28	2.6
Turnout		1,116	54.8
SNP win (new seat)			

Ward 14: Ardconnel - Kilmore
Party	Candidate	Votes	%
Independent	D McIntyre	410	31.9
Liberal Democrats	A Baker	300	23.3
Independent	J Hyde	288	22.4
Independent	A MacKinnon	240	18.7
Independent	A M Dairon	47	3.7
Majority		110	8.6
Turnout		1,285	66.3
Independent gain from Liberal Democrats			

Ward 15: North Lorn
Party	Candidate	Votes	%
SNP	C Cameron	905	59.8
Independent	G Burton	609	40.2
Majority		296	19.6
Turnout		1,514	69.1
SNP hold			

Ward 16: Mull
Party	Candidate	Votes	%
Independent	A MacDougall	905	59.8
SNP	D Cattanach	609	40.2
Majority		296	19.6
Turnout		1,514	66.4
Independent gain from Independent			

Ward 17: Tiree and Coll
Party	Candidate	Votes	%
Independent	I Gillies	Unopposed	N/A
Independent hold			

Ward 18: Bute North
Party	Candidate	Votes	%
SNP	R Macintyre	Unopposed	N/A
SNP gain from Independent			

Ward 19: Bute Central
Party	Candidate	Votes	%
SNP	I Strong	611	45.2
Independent	F Gillies	376	27.8
Labour	J Gorman	166	12.3
Liberal Democrats	M Hamilton	131	9.7
Independent	D Flowers	68	5.0
Majority		235	17.4
Turnout		1,352	63.7
SNP gain from Independent			

Ward 20: Bute South
Party	Candidate	Votes	%
Independent	A L Scoullar	896	72.5
Independent	R McNamara	172	13.9
SNP	J B Judge	168	13.6
Majority		724	58.6
Turnout		1,236	70.6
Independent gain from Independent			

Ward 21: East Lochfyne
Party	Candidate	Votes	%
Independent	D C Currie	662	42.2
SNP	A Clayton	575	36.6
Conservative	J D Geary	332	21.2
Majority		87	5.6
Turnout		1,569	70.7
Independent gain from SNP			

Ward 22: Kirn and Hunter's Quay
Party	Candidate	Votes	%
SNP	E MacTaggart	548	43.5
Conservative	E Waddell	381	30.2
Independent	B J Chennell	331	26.3
Majority		167	13.3
Turnout		1,260	65.2
SNP hold			

Ward 23: Ardenslate
Party	Candidate	Votes	%
Independent	J McQueen	410	33.8
SNP	A MacAlister	306	25.3
Labour	D Divers	287	23.7
Independent	J Allison	209	17.2
Majority		104	8.5
Turnout		1,212	60.5
Independent gain from Independent			

Ward 24: Milton
Party	Candidate	Votes	%
Labour	S Gray	583	54.7
SNP	J Scott	483	45.3
Majority		100	9.4
Turnout		1,066	59.7
Labour gain from Independent			

Ward 25: Auchamore and Innellan
Party	Candidate	Votes	%
Independent	Dick Walsh	976	70.9
SNP	J McGoran	401	29.1
Majority		575	41.8
Turnout		1,377	67.9
Independent hold			

Ward 26: Holy Loch
Party	Candidate	Votes	%
Conservative	T B Marshall	512	35.3
SNP	R E Rees	453	31.2
Labour	G McKinven	412	28.4
Independent	N McGugan	75	5.2
Majority		59	4.1
Turnout		1,452	70.2
Conservative gain from SNP			

Ward 27: Helensburgh East
Party	Candidate	Votes	%
Liberal Democrats	F Thompson	616	52.6
Labour	D Phillips	345	29.5
Conservative	G Douglas	113	9.7
Independent	J Young	96	8.2
Majority		271	23.1
Turnout		1,170	58.0
Liberal Democrats win (new seat)			

Ward 28: East Central Helensburgh
Party	Candidate	Votes	%
Liberal Democrats	M Stewart	635	53.7
Independent	N Millar	395	33.4
Conservative	R Reading	153	12.9
Majority		240	20.3
Turnout		1,183	63.4
Liberal Democrats win (new seat)			

Ward 29: Helensburgh Central
Party	Candidate	Votes	%
Conservative	S Wilson	351	30.6
Independent	G Hanning	315	27.5
SNP	L Leven	244	21.3
Liberal Democrats	P Trenaman	236	20.6
Majority		36	3.1
Turnout		1,146	55.2
Conservative win (new seat)			

Ward 30: Helensburgh North
Party	Candidate	Votes	%
Liberal Democrats	E Morton	525	45.5
Independent	J Weldon	347	30.1
Conservative	P Ramsay	282	24.4
Majority		178	15.4
Turnout		1,154	56.9
Liberal Democrats win (new seat)			

Ward 31: Helensburgh West
Party	Candidate	Votes	%
Conservative	J Stirling	529	34.4
Liberal Democrats	A Reay	391	25.4
Independent	D Sinclair	374	24.3
Labour	J Eaton	243	15.8
Majority		138	9.0
Turnout		1,537	64.8
Conservative win (new seat)			

Ward 32: West Helensburgh and Rhu
Party	Candidate	Votes	%
Independent	S Latimer	577	47.1
Conservative	G Mulvaney	442	36.1
SNP	E Buist	206	16.8
Majority		135	11.0
Turnout		1,225	64.9
Independent win (new seat)			

Ward 33: Garelochhead and Cove
Party	Candidate	Votes	%
Independent	G Freeman	775	81.5
Liberal Democrats	J Sheffield	176	18.5
Majority		599	63.0
Turnout		951	58.5
Independent gain from Independent			

Ward 34: Arrochar, Luss, Arden and Ardenconnell
Party	Candidate	Votes	%
Independent	W Petrie	672	57.7
Independent	E Carberry	351	30.2
Conservative	C Skrastin	101	8.7
Faslane Peace	P Monaghan	40	3.4
Majority		321	27.5
Turnout		1,164	60.6
Independent hold			

Ward 35: Rosneath, Clynder and Kilcreggan
Party	Candidate	Votes	%
Liberal Democrats	P Coleshill	684	53.7
Independent	D Kelly	590	46.3
Majority		94	7.4
Turnout		1,274	62.6
Liberal Democrats win (new seat)			

Ward 36: Cardross
Party	Candidate	Votes	%
Independent	R Kinloch	996	77.6
SNP	V Nelson	288	22.4
Majority		708	55.2
Turnout		1,284	68.3
Independent hold			
