= 1995 Aberdeenshire Council election =

1995 Scottish local government election

6 April 1995	1999 →

All 47 seats to Aberdeenshire Council 24 seats needed for a majority
	First party	Second party
Party	SNP	Liberal Democrats
Seats won	15	15
Popular vote	21,508	15,612
Percentage	33.1%	24.0%
	Third party	Fourth party
Party	Independent	Conservative
Seats won	13	4
Popular vote	16,734	7,019
Percentage	25.8%	10.8%

Elections to the newly created Aberdeenshire Council were held on 6 April 1995, the same day as the other Scottish local government elections. This was the first election to the new unitary Aberdeenshire Council. There were 47 wards, which each elected a single member using the first-past-the-post voting system.

== Results ==
1995 Aberdeenshire Council election result
Party	Seats	Gains	Losses	Net gain/loss	Seats %	Votes %	Votes	+/−
SNP	15	-	-		32.0	33.1	21,508	New
Liberal Democrats	15	-	-		32.0	24.0	15,612	New
Independent	13	-	-		27.7	25.8	16,734	New
Conservative	4	-	-		8.5	10.8	7,019	New
Labour	0	-	-		0.0	6.3	4,064	New
Scottish Green	0	-	-		0.0	0.1	42	New
