= 1992 Argyll and Bute District Council election =

1992 Scottish local government election

1992 Argyll and Bute Council election
← 1988	6 May 1992	1995 →

All 26 seats to Argyll and Bute District Council 14 seats needed for a majority
	First party	Second party	Third party
Party	Independent	Conservative	Liberal Democrats
Last election	16	3	3
Seats won	16	4	3
Seat change	0	▲1	0
Popular vote	7,223	2,247	1,657
Percentage	50.1%	15.6%	11.5%
Swing	▼6.9%	▲4.4%	▲1.6%
	Fourth party	Fifth party
Party	SNP	Labour
Last election	3	1
Seats won	2	1
Seat change	▼1	0
Popular vote	2,235	1,055
Percentage	15.5%	7.3%
Swing	▲2.6%	▼1.7%
- Composition of District Council after the election
Council Control before election
Independent
Council Control
Independent

Elections to Argyll and Bute Council were held in May 1992, the same day as the other Scottish local government elections. The election was the last for the Argyll and Bute District Council, as the council would be replaced with the Argyll and Bute unitary authority for the 1995 election.

== Election results ==
Argyll and Bute local election result 1992
Party	Seats	Gains	Losses	Net gain/loss	Seats %	Votes %	Votes	+/−
Independent	16	0	0	0	61.5	50.2	7,223	▼6.9
Conservative	4	1	0	▲1	15.4	15.6	2,247	▲4.4
Liberal Democrats	3	0	0	0	11.5	11.5	1,657	▲1.6
SNP	2	0	1	▼1	7.7	15.6	2,235	▲2.6
Labour	1	0	0	0	3.8	7.4	1,055	▼1.7
