= 1999 Dundee City Council election =

1999 Scottish local government election

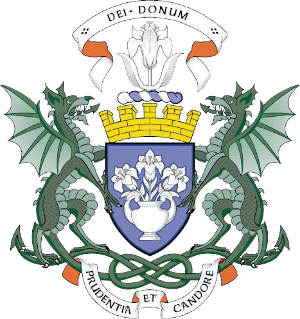
- 6 May 1999

All 29 seats to Dundee City Council 15 seats needed for a majority
	First party	Second party
Party	Labour	SNP
Seats won	14	10
	Third party	Fourth party
Party	Conservative	Independent Labour
Seats won	4	1
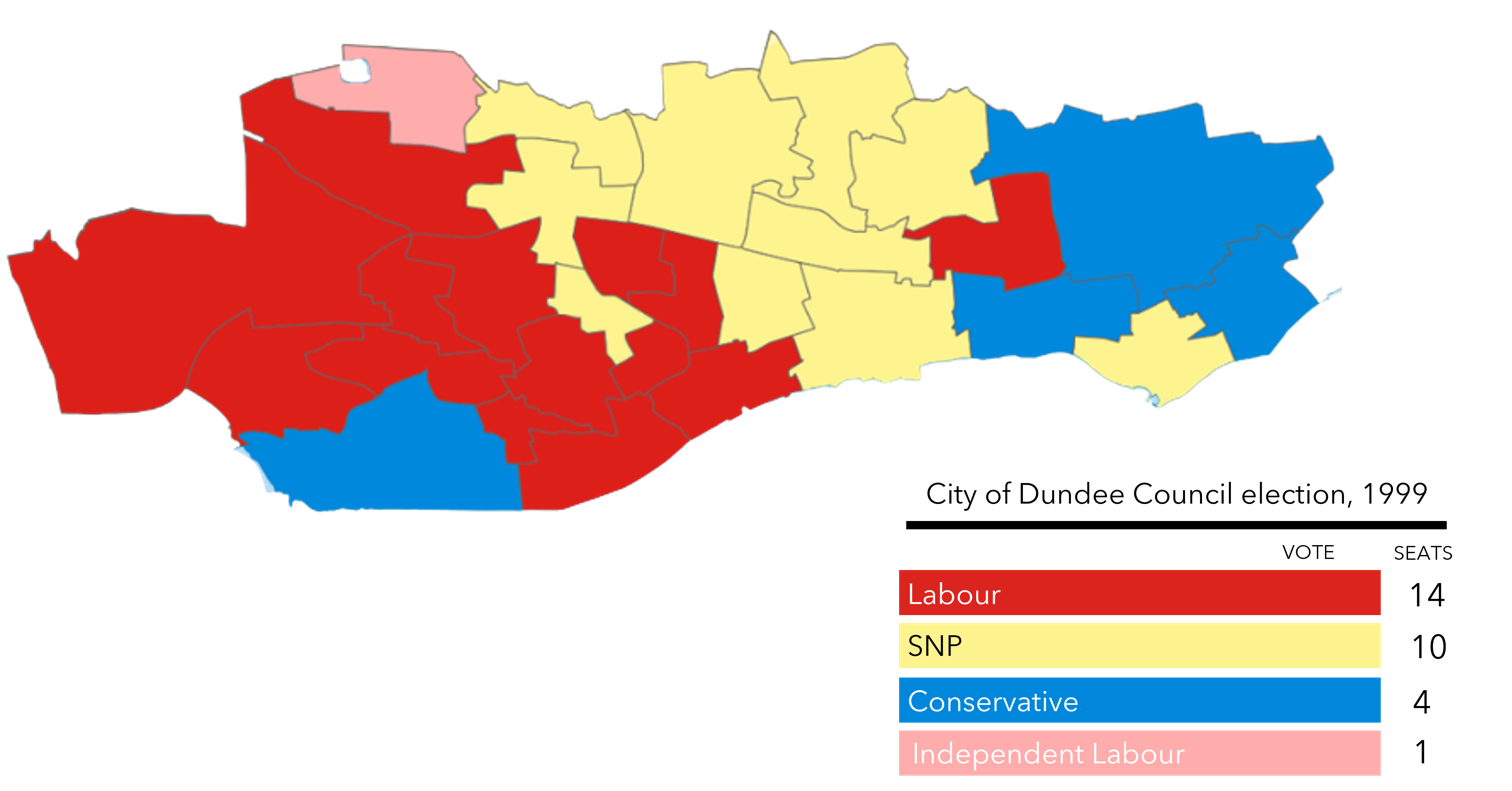
- The 29 single-member wards

The 1999 Dundee City Council election took place on 6 May 1999 to elect members of Dundee City Council, as part of the Scottish local elections of that year.

== Results ==
1999 Dundee City Council election result
Party	Seats	Gains	Losses	Net gain/loss	Seats %	Votes %	Votes	+/−
Labour	14			▼14	48.3			
SNP	10			▲7	34.5			
Conservative	4			Steady	13.8			
Independent Labour	1			▲1	3.4			
Liberal Democrats	0			Steady	0.0			
Green	0			Steady	0.0			
Scottish Socialist	0			Steady	0.0			
