= 1995 Moray Council election =

1995 Scottish local government election

- 6 April 1995

All 18 seats to Moray Council 10 seats needed for a majority
	First party	Second party	Third party
Party	SNP	Labour	Independent
Last election	7 seats, 46.1%	1 seat, 4.1%	9 seats, 35.7%
Seats won	13	3	2
Seat change	▲6	▲2	▼7
Popular vote	11,337	4,436	4,458
Percentage	50.2%	19.7%	19.8%
Swing	▲4.1%	▲15.6%	▼15.9%
- Map of ward results

- Council composition following the election

Elections to Moray Council were held on 6 April 1995, on the same day as the other Scottish local government elections. This was the first election to the unitary council following the implementation of the Local Government etc. (Scotland) Act 1994.

The election used the 18 wards created by the Formation Electoral Arrangements in 1994. Each ward elected one councillor using first-past-the-post voting.

== Background ==
The 1992 election was the last to send members to the Moray District Council. At that election the Independent group retained their 9 seats, and the Conservatives regained representation on the council since losing any representation in 1988.

1992 Moray Council election results
Party	Seats	Vote share
Independent	9	35.7%
SNP	7	46.1%
Conservative	1	10.1%
Labour	1	4.1%

== Results ==
1995 Moray Council election result
Party	Seats	Gains	Losses	Net gain/loss	Seats %	Votes %	Votes	+/−
SNP	13	6	0	▲6	72.2	50.2	11,337	▲4.1
Labour	3	2	0	▲2	16.7	19.7	4,436	▲15.6
Independent	2	0	7	▼7	11.1	19.8	4,458	▼15.9
Liberal Democrats	0	0	0	Steady	0.0	8.1	1,837	▲3.9
Conservative	0	0	1	▼1	0.0	2.2	501	▼7.9

== Ward results ==
=== Bishopmill ===
Party	Candidate	Votes	%
Labour	C Smith	1,233	69.7
SNP	R Pattie	317	17.9
Independent	J Mackessack-Leitch	220	12.4
Majority		916	51.8
Turnout		1,770	40.7
Labour gain from Independent			

=== Cathedral ===
Party	Candidate	Votes	%
Labour	A Farqhuarson (Incumbent)	788	51.2
SNP	M Hardie	495	32.2
Conservative	A Cooper	170	11.1
Liberal Democrats	J Webster	85	5.5
Majority		293	19.0
Turnout		1,538	40.7
Labour hold			

=== New Elgin ===
Party	Candidate	Votes	%
SNP	M Anderson (Incumbent)	647	52.8
Labour	J McGettrick	488	39.8
Liberal Democrats	H Johnstone	90	7.3
Majority		159	13.0
Turnout		1,225	34.2
SNP hold			

=== Central West ===
Party	Candidate	Votes	%
SNP	H McDonald	717	48.9
Labour	L Easton	483	32.9
Liberal Democrats	W Nelson	267	18.2
Majority		234	16.0
Turnout		1,467	37.8
SNP gain from Independent			

=== Forres ===
Party	Candidate	Votes	%
SNP	H Cumiskie (Incumbent)	Unopposed	
SNP hold			

=== Findhorn Valley ===
Party	Candidate	Votes	%
SNP	R Laing	741	59.8
Independent	W Swanson (Incumbent)	448	36.2
Independent	S Tinsley	50	4.0
Majority		293	23.6
Turnout		1,239	31.2
SNP gain from Independent			

=== Heldon ===
Party	Candidate	Votes	%
SNP	C Scaife	707	62.0
Liberal Democrats	M McLintock	434	38.0
Majority		273	24.0
Turnout		1,141	29.7
SNP gain from Independent			

=== Innes ===
Party	Candidate	Votes	%
Independent	J Shaw (Incumbent)	576	41.6
SNP	P Cruickshank	522	37.7
Labour	I Gray	197	14.2
Liberal Democrats	D Cameron	91	6.6
Majority		54	3.9
Turnout		1,386	37.8
Independent hold			

=== Lossiemouth ===
Party	Candidate	Votes	%
SNP	D Crawford	850	56.0
Independent	A Fleming (Incumbent)	668	44.0
Majority		182	12.0
Turnout		1,518	44.3
SNP hold			

=== Laich ===
Party	Candidate	Votes	%
SNP	J Stewart	841	61.8
Conservative	D Thompson (Incumbent)	331	24.3
Liberal Democrats	G Towns	188	13.8
Majority		510	37.5
Turnout		1,360	39.5
SNP gain from Conservative			

=== Buckie West ===
Party	Candidate	Votes	%
SNP	W Jappy (Incumbent)	Unopposed	
SNP hold			

=== Buckie East ===
Party	Candidate	Votes	%
SNP	G McDonald	894	84.5
Liberal Democrats	G Holm	164	15.5
Majority		730	69.0
Turnout		1,058	30.2
SNP hold			

=== Rathford ===
Party	Candidate	Votes	%
SNP	M Howe	782	50.9
Independent	M Wilson	675	44.0
Liberal Democrats	P Cromar	78	5.1
Majority		107	6.9
Turnout		1,535	44.6
SNP gain from Independent			

=== Lennox ===
Party	Candidate	Votes	%
SNP	T Howe (Incumbent)	1,089	62.5
Independent	I Lawson	494	28.4
Liberal Democrats	J Milton	159	9.1
Majority		595	34.1
Turnout		1,742	48.2
SNP hold			

=== Keith ===
Party	Candidate	Votes	%
Labour	P Mann	721	45.1
SNP	B Ewan	666	41.7
Liberal Democrats	G Duncan	210	13.1
Majority		55	3.4
Turnout		1,597	51.3
Labour gain from Independent			

=== Strathisla ===
Party	Candidate	Votes	%
SNP	R Patterson	483	39.4
Independent	M Davidson (Incumbent)	476	38.8
Labour	A Thomson	268	21.8
Majority		7	0.6
Turnout		1,227	40.8
SNP gain from Independent			

=== Speyside ===
Party	Candidate	Votes	%
Independent	E Aldridge (Incumbent)	851	51.6
SNP	P Paul	728	44.1
Liberal Democrats	E Cameron	71	4.3
Majority		123	7.5
Turnout		1,650	51.3
Independent hold			

=== Glenlivet ===
Party	Candidate	Votes	%
SNP	A Scott (Incumbent)	858	76.9
Labour	F Lipphardt	258	23.1
Majority		600	53.8
Turnout		1,116	36.3
SNP hold			
