= 1995 Scottish local elections =

- 6 April 1995

1,155 seats to 29 mainland Scottish councils
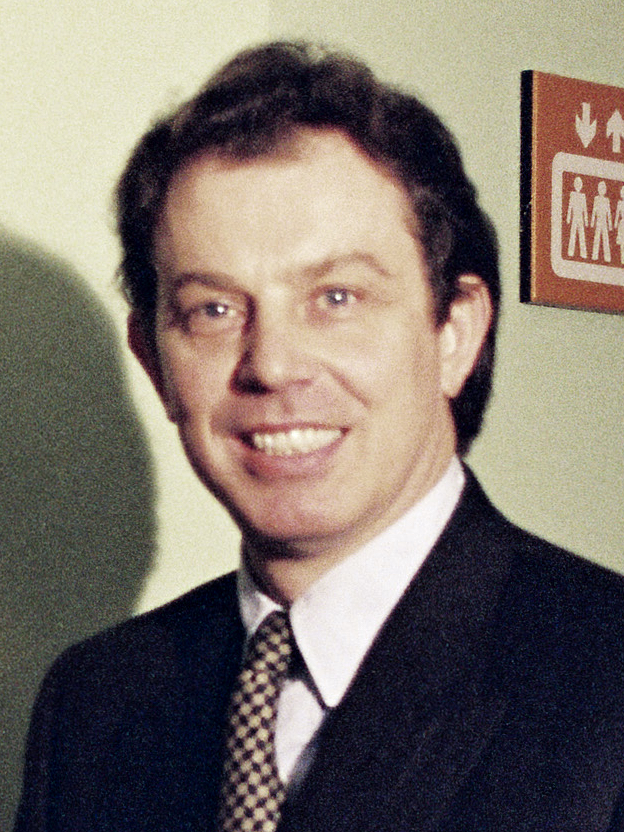

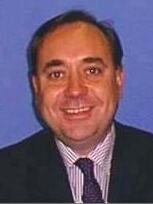

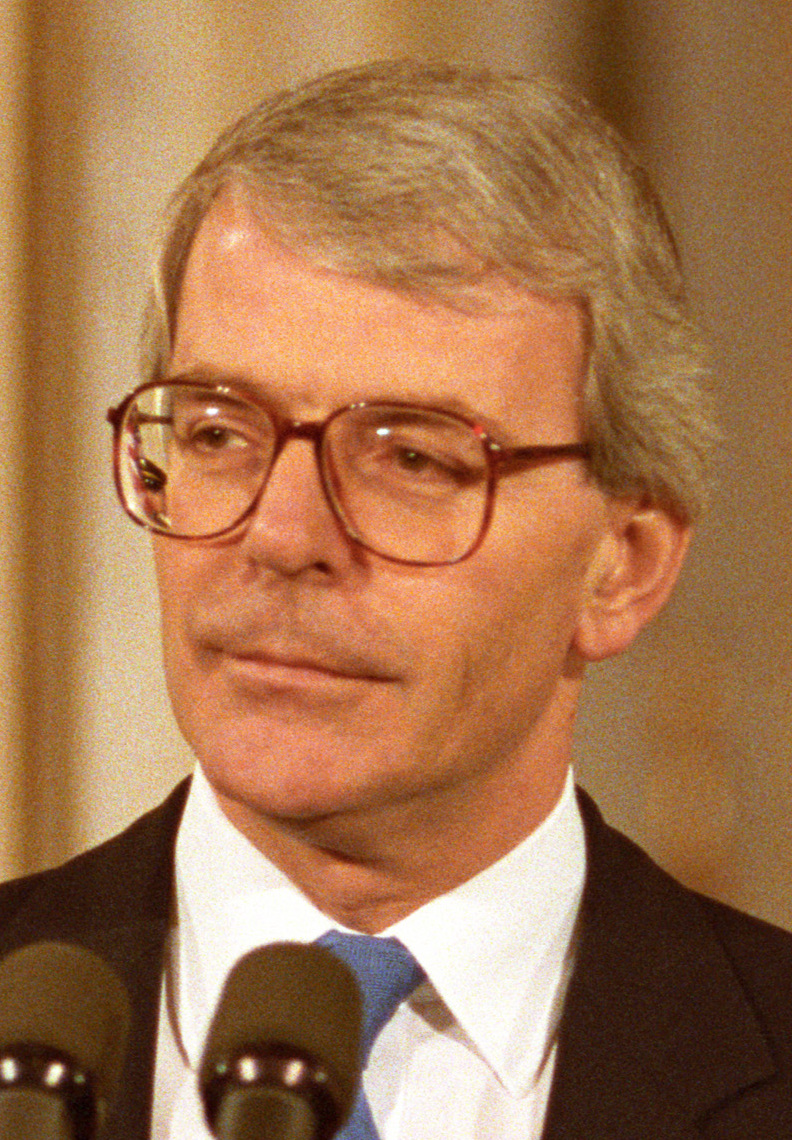

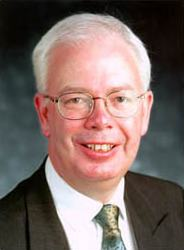
	First party	Second party
Leader	Tony Blair	Alex Salmond
Party	Labour	SNP
Leader since	21 July 1994	22 September 1990
Seats won	613	181
Popular vote	742,557	444,918
Percentage	43.57%	26.11%
	Third party	Fourth party
Leader	John Major	Jim Wallace
Party	Conservative	Liberal Democrats
Leader since	27 November 1990	18 April 1992
Seats won	82	121
Popular vote	196,109	166,141
Percentage	11.51%	9.79%
- Colours denote the winning party with outright control

- Colours denote the largest party in council

- Colours denote the winning party in each ward

Local elections were held in Scotland on 6 April 1995, as part of the Local Government etc. (Scotland) Act 1994. The elections were held for the 29 new mainland unitary authorities created under the act, which replaced the nine former regions established in 1975. The three island areas (Orkney, Shetland and the Western Isles) were retained from the previous system. These areas did not take part in the 1995 election, having held local elections on 5 May 1994.

== National results ==
Summary of the 5 April 1995 Scottish council election results
Parties	Votes	Votes %	Councillors
Labour	742,557	43.57	613
SNP	444,918	26.11	181
Conservative	196,109	11.51	82
Liberal Democrats	166,141	9.79	121
Independent	130,642	7.67	151
Other	23,781	1.36	7
Total	1,702,148		1,155

== Results by council area ==
Council	1995 result	Details
Aberdeen City	Labour	Details
Aberdeenshire	No overall control	Details
Angus	SNP	Details
Argyll and Bute	Independent	Details
Clackmannanshire	Labour	
Dumfries and Galloway	Labour	
Dundee City	Labour	Details
East Ayrshire	Labour	Details
East Dunbartonshire	Labour	
East Lothian	Labour	Details
East Renfrewshire	No overall control	Details
City of Edinburgh	Labour	Details
Falkirk	Labour	
Fife	Labour	Details
Glasgow City	Labour	Details
Highland	Independent	Details
Inverclyde	Labour	Details
Midlothian	Labour	Details
Moray	SNP	Details
North Ayrshire	Labour	Details
North Lanarkshire	Labour	
Perth and Kinross	SNP	
Renfrewshire	Labour	
Scottish Borders	No overall control	Details
South Ayrshire	Labour	Details
South Lanarkshire	Labour	Details
Stirling	Labour	
West Dunbartonshire	Labour	Details
West Lothian	Labour	Details

== See also ==
- Elections in Scotland
