= 1999 West Lothian Council election =

1999 Scottish local government election

- 6 May 1999

All 32 seats to West Lothian Council 17 seats needed for a majority
	First party	Second party	Third party
Party	Labour	SNP	Conservative
Last election	15 seats, 46.9%	11 seats, 44.6%	1 seats, 4.2%
Seats won	20	11	1
Seat change	▲5	Steady	Steady
Popular vote	31,498	29,052	6,040
Percentage	45.1%	41.6%	8.6%
Swing	▼1.8%	▼3.0%	▲4.4%
- Map of ward results

- Council composition following the election

Elections to West Lothian Council were held on 6 May 1999, on the same day as the other Scottish local government elections. This was the second election to the unitary council following the implementation of the Local Government etc. (Scotland) Act 1994.

The election used the 32 wards created by the Third Statutory Reviews of Electoral Arrangements in 1998. Each ward elected one councillor using first-past-the-post voting.

== Results ==
1999 West Lothian Council election result
Party	Seats	Gains	Losses	Net gain/loss	Seats %	Votes %	Votes	+/−
Labour	20			▲5	62.5	45.1	31,498	▼1.8
SNP	11			Steady	34.4	41.6	29,052	▼3.0
Conservative	1			Steady	3.1	8.6	6,040	▲4.4
Liberal Democrats	0			Steady	0.0	4.5	3,158	▲2.5
Independent	0			Steady	0.0	0.2	156	▼1.8
