= 1999 South Lanarkshire Council election =

South Lanarkshire Council election

- 6 May 1999

All 67 seats to South Lanarkshire Council 34 seats needed for a majority
- Registered: 235,695
- Turnout: 59.7%
	First party	Second party
	Lab	SNP
Leader	Edward McAvoy
Party	Labour	SNP
Leader's seat	Bankhead
Last election	61 seats, 57.0%	8 seats, 26.8%
Seats won	51	10
Seat change	▼10	▲2
Popular vote	69,877	46,160
Percentage	50.1%	33.1%
Swing	▼7.0	▼6.3
	Third party	Fourth party
	Con	LD
Party	Conservative	Liberal Democrats
Last election	2 seat, 7.0%	2 seat, 7.1%
Seats won	2	1
Seat change	Steady	▼1
Popular vote	14,316	7,900
Percentage	10.3%	5.7%
Swing	▲3.3%	▼1.4%
Council Leader before election
Tom McCabe
Labour
Council Leader after election
Edward McAvoy
Labour

Elections to South Lanarkshire Council were held on 6 May 1999, alongside elections to the Scottish Parliament. This was the second election following the local government reforms in 1994 and the first following the Third Statutory Reviews of Electoral Arrangements which resulted in six fewer seats from the previous election.

The council remained under Labour control following the election - they won seven fewer seats and collected 7% less of the overall vote share than in 1995, but with less seats available their percentage loss was only 3%, and the number of votes they collected increased substantially due to the higher voter turnout, which went up from 107,833 (46.4% turnout) in 1995 to 139,564 (59.2% turnout), an increase of 29%; this was at least partly attributable to the interest in the new Scottish Parliament - the 1995 election had not been held in conjunction with votes for any other body.

The SNP and Conservative vote numbers also each nearly doubled, but with far less dramatic gains in terms of their vote share and seats. In those circumstances, the Liberal Democrats polling almost the same numbers as four years earlier could be seen as the most disappointing outcome for a major party in South Lanarkshire, in contrast to their positive overall results across Scotland on the night.

== Results ==
1999 South Lanarkshire Council election result
Party	Seats	Gains	Losses	Net gain/loss	Seats %	Votes %	Votes	+/−
Labour	54			▼7	80.6	50.1	69,877	▼7.0
SNP	10			▲2	14.9	33.1	46,160	▲6.1
Conservative	2			Steady	3.0	10.3	14,316	▲3.3
Liberal Democrats	1			▼1	1.5	5.7	7,900	▼1.4
Independent	0			Steady	0.0	0.6	888	▼0.5
Scottish Socialist	0			Steady	0.0	0.2	280	New
Socialist Labour	0			Steady	0.0	0.1	243	New
Total	67						139,664	

== Ward results ==
=== Lanark North ===
Lanark North
Party	Candidate	Votes	%	±%
Labour	M. McNeill	866	37.9	▼10.1
Conservative	D. Fanshaw	719	31.5	▲3.5
SNP	T. Ashburn	502	22.0	▲9.3
Liberal Democrats	R. Waddell	196	8.6	▲4.5
Majority		147	6.4	▼13.6
Turnout		2,283	62.3	11.4
Registered electors		3,676		
Labour hold		Swing	▼7.8	

=== Lanark South ===
Lanark South
Party	Candidate	Votes	%	±%
Labour	D. MacDonald	828	41.2	▼8.5
SNP	F. Gunning	631	31.4	▲16.0
Conservative	A. Campbell	355	17.6	New
Liberal Democrats	L. Grieve	198	9.8	▲6.9
Majority		197	9.8	▼14.2
Turnout		2,012	58.0	▲7.4
Registered electors		3,480		
Labour hold		Swing	▼12.2	

=== Lesmahagow ===
Lesmahagow
Party	Candidate	Votes	%	±%
Labour	A. McInnes	1,497	71.1	▼15.2
SNP	K. Cairns	609	28.9	▲15.2
Majority		888	42.2	▼30.4
Turnout		2,106	61.0	▲15.5
Registered electors		3,513		
Labour hold		Swing	▼15.2	

=== Blackwood ===
Blackwood
Party	Candidate	Votes	%	±%
SNP	R. Murray	1,179	59.4	▲38.3
Labour	E. Serrals	805	40.6	▼30.4
Majority		374	18.9	N/A
Turnout		1,984	63.0	▲18.0
Registered electors		3,193		
SNP gain from Labour		Swing	▲34.3	

=== Clyde Valley ===
Clyde Valley
Party	Candidate	Votes	%	±%
SNP	C. Winning	756	37.0	▼11.4
Labour	E. Wright	720	35.2	▲5.0
Conservative	J. Young	332	16.2	▼5.2
Liberal Democrats	C. Robbins	236	11.5	New
Majority		36	1.8	▼16.6
Turnout		2,044	61.0	▲14.6
Registered electors		3,355		
SNP hold		Swing	▼8.2	

=== Biggar/Symington and Black Mount ===
Biggar/Symington and Black Mount
Party	Candidate	Votes	%
SNP	T. McAlpine	1,283	58.8
Conservative	J. Lyon	680	31.2
Labour	J. Kennedy	218	10.0
Majority		603	27.6
Turnout		2,181	65.0
Registered electors		3,368	
SNP win (new seat)			

=== Duneaton/Carmichael ===
Duneaton/Carmichael
Party	Candidate	Votes	%
Conservative	A. Forrest	954	56.7
SNP	A. Parker	385	22.9
Labour	M. Bow	344	20.4
Majority		569	33.8
Turnout		1,683	59.0
Registered electors		2,851	
Conservative win (new seat)			

=== Carstairs/Carnwath ===
Carstairs/Carnwath
Party	Candidate	Votes	%
SNP	B. Gauld	900	47.7
Labour	M. Wardlow	630	33.4
Conservative	E. Ross-Taylor	355	18.8
Majority		270	14.3
Turnout		1,885	58.0
Registered electors		3,260	
SNP win (new seat)			

=== Douglas ===
Douglas
Party	Candidate	Votes	%	±%
SNP	L. Addison	1,283	49.6	▲35.3
Labour	D. Meikle	1,136	43.9	▼10.2
Conservative	P. Ross-Taylor	167	6.5	New
Majority		147	5.7	N/A
Turnout		2,586	71.0	▲2.7
Registered electors		3,644		
SNP gain from Labour		Swing	▲22.7	

=== Carluke/Whitehill ===
Carluke/Whitehill
Party	Candidate	Votes	%	±%
Labour	Eileen Logan	1,536	63.9	▼14.0
SNP	L. Muir	866	36.1	▲14.0
Majority		670	27.9	▼27.9
Turnout		2,402	61.0	▲12.1
Registered electors		3,983		
Labour hold		Swing	▼14.0	

=== Carluke/Crawforddyke ===
Carluke/Crawforddyke
Party	Candidate	Votes	%	±%
Labour	W. Ross	1,192	51.5	▼3.9
SNP	I. Gray	953	41.2	▲5.9
Conservative	H. Ross-Tayor	168	7.3	▲2.4
Majority		239	10.3	▼9.8
Turnout		2,313	65.0	▲11.1
Registered electors		3,537		
Labour hold		Swing	▼4.9	

=== Forth ===
Forth
Party	Candidate	Votes	%
Labour	J. Roberts	1,393	58.6
SNP	B. Brown	986	41.4
Majority		407	17.1
Turnout		2,379	61.0
Registered electors		3,896	
Labour hold			

In 1995, there was no election in Forth following the death of one of the candidates and a by-election was held to fill the vacancy. The percentage change with the by-election has not been included.

=== Law/Carluke ===
Law/Carluke
Party	Candidate	Votes	%	±%
SNP	David Shearer	1,453	56.7	▼1.6
Labour	A. Murdoch	799	31.2	▼10.5
Conservative	K. Latus	311	12.1	New
Majority		654	25.5	▲8.9
Turnout		2,563	64.0	▲9.1
Registered electors		4,039		
SNP hold		Swing	▲4.4	

=== Long Calderwood ===
Long Calderwood
Party	Candidate	Votes	%	±%
Labour	A. Carlin	1,154	55.5	▼6.0
SNP	J. Lowe	925	44.5	▲12.4
Majority		229	11.0	▼18.4
Turnout		2,079	59.0	▲12.5
Registered electors		3,623		
Labour hold		Swing	▼9.2	

=== Calderglen ===
Calderglen
Party	Candidate	Votes	%	±%
SNP	J. Wardhaugh	900	40.1	▲13.6
Labour	R. Scott	884	39.4	▼25.5
Liberal Democrats	D. Ford	244	10.9	▲6.5
Conservative	M. Lang	216	9.6	▲5.5
Majority		16	0.7	N/A
Turnout		2,244	65.0	▲20.9
Registered electors		3,448		
SNP gain from Labour		Swing	▲19.5	

=== Blacklaw ===
Blacklaw
Party	Candidate	Votes	%	±%
SNP	A. Maggs	1,196	49.8	▲23.7
Labour	P. Duff	896	37.3	▼29.7
Conservative	I. Harrow	311	12.9	New
Majority		300	12.5	N/A
Turnout		2,403	69.0	▲23.3
Registered electors		3,529		
SNP gain from Labour		Swing	▲26.7	

=== Morrishall ===
Morrishall
Party	Candidate	Votes	%	±%
Labour	A. Dick	1,286	59.1	▼11.8
SNP	A. McLean	680	31.3	▲2.2
Conservative	M. Oldenkamp	210	9.7	New
Majority		606	27.8	▼14.0
Turnout		2,176	63.0	▲13.5
Registered electors		3,488		
Labour hold		Swing	▼7.0	

=== Maxwellton ===
Maxwellton
Party	Candidate	Votes	%	±%
Labour	C. Thompson	1,225	53.7	▼10.8
SNP	G. Ferguson	812	35.6	▲11.1
Conservative	L. Kay	246	10.8	▲4.0
Majority		413	18.1	▼21.9
Turnout		2,283	66.0	▲11.0
Registered electors		3,478		
Labour hold		Swing	▼10.9	

=== East Mains ===
East Mains
Party	Candidate	Votes	%	±%
Labour	A. Mitchell	1,401	62.0	▼7.0
SNP	J. Anderson	860	38.0	▲14.0
Majority		541	23.9	▼21.1
Turnout		2,261	65.0	▲10.8
Registered electors		3,572		
Labour hold		Swing	▼10.5	

=== West Mains ===
West Mains
Party	Candidate	Votes	%	±%
Labour	W. McNab	1,450	63.4	▼6.2
SNP	J. Anderson	836	36.6	▲10.6
Majority		614	26.9	▼16.7
Turnout		2,286	65.0	▲11.5
Registered electors		3,610		
Labour hold		Swing	▼8.4	

=== Duncanrig ===
Duncanrig
Party	Candidate	Votes	%	±%
Labour	S. Crawford	1,289	60.0	▼7.5
SNP	D. McAnsh	861	40.0	▲11.3
Majority		428	19.9	▼18.9
Turnout		2,150	63.0	▲14.5
Registered electors		3,459		
Labour hold		Swing	▼9.4	

=== Westwoodhill ===
Westwoodhill
Party	Candidate	Votes	%	±%
Labour	G. Scott	994	46.8	▼9.6
SNP	J. Anderson	731	34.4	▼9.2
Independent	J. Pieper	401	18.9	New
Majority		263	12.4	▼0.4
Turnout		2,126	63.0	▲16.2
Registered electors		3,371		
Labour hold		Swing	▼0.2	

=== Headhouse ===
Headhouse
Party	Candidate	Votes	%	±%
Labour	P. Watters	969	45.8	▼25.1
SNP	D. Coll	662	31.3	▲1.4
Independent	J. McMonigle	487	23.0	New
Majority		307	14.5	▼27.3
Turnout		2,118	63.0	▲16.3
Registered electors		3,401		
Labour hold		Swing	▼13.2	

=== Heatheryknowe ===
Heatheryknowe
Party	Candidate	Votes	%
Labour	Gerry Convery	1,159	58.7
SNP	E. McDougall	817	41.3
Majority		342	17.3
Turnout		1,976	60.0
Registered electors		3,348	
Labour win (new seat)			

=== Greenhills ===
Greenhills
Party	Candidate	Votes	%	±%
SNP	A. Buchanan	1,276	65.4	▲32.5
Labour	M. Legowski	612	31.4	▼35.7
Scottish Socialist	T. Simmons	64	3.3	New
Majority		654	34.0	N/A
Turnout		1,952	59.0	▲19.4
Registered electors		3,356		
SNP gain from Labour		Swing	▲34.1	

=== Whitehills ===
Whitehills
Party	Candidate	Votes	%
Labour	J. Docherty	1,318	63.3
SNP	A. Shaw	628	30.2
Scottish Socialist	W. Cunningham	135	6.5
Majority		690	33.2
Turnout		2,081	59.0
Registered electors		3,564	
Labour win (new seat)			

=== Hairmyres/Crosshouse ===
Hairmyres/Crosshouse
Party	Candidate	Votes	%
SNP	David Watson	1,011	46.5
Labour	J. Cairney	808	37.2
Conservative	R. Griffiths	151	7.0
Liberal Democrats	C. Linskey	121	5.6
Scottish Socialist	A. Gordon	81	3.7
Majority		203	9.3
Turnout		2,172	62.0
Registered electors		3,509	
SNP win (new seat)			

=== Mossneuk/Kittoch ===
Mossneuk/Kittoch
Party	Candidate	Votes	%
Labour	M. McCann	842	40.6
SNP	D. Edwards	717	34.5
Conservative	M. McCulloch	517	24.9
Majority		125	6.0
Turnout		2,076	62.0
Registered electors		3,388	
Labour win (new seat)			

=== Stewartfield ===
Stewartfield
Party	Candidate	Votes	%	±%
Labour	C. Hughes	965	47.9	▼3.6
SNP	P. McGuire	626	31.1	▼1.1
Conservative	J. Davidson	425	21.1	▲11.1
Majority		339	16.8	▼2.5
Turnout		2,016	60.0	▲18.5
Registered electors		3,369		
Labour hold		Swing	▼1.2	

=== Lindsay ===
Lindsay
Party	Candidate	Votes	%	±%
Labour	G. Docherty	827	41.1	▲1.3
SNP	C. Cameron	809	40.2	▲9.0
Conservative	G. Bias	376	18.7	▼2.8
Majority		18	0.9	▼7.7
Turnout		2,012	64.0	▲22.4
Registered electors		3,134		
Labour hold		Swing	▼3.8	

=== Avondale North ===
Avondale North
Party	Candidate	Votes	%	±%
Labour	J. Molloy	869	38.4	▼1.4
Conservative	C. Ballard	616	27.2	▼6.1
Liberal Democrats	H. Cruden	529	23.4	▲17.9
SNP	M. Sinclair	249	11.0	▼11.7
Majority		253	11.2	▲5.0
Turnout		2,263	62.0	▲15.4
Registered electors		3,676		
Labour hold		Swing	▲2.3	

=== Avondale South ===
Avondale South
Party	Candidate	Votes	%	±%
Conservative	H. MacDonald	1,139	44.9	▲12.3
Labour	J. Quinn	738	29.1	▼2.2
SNP	D. McLean	658	26.0	▼4.4
Majority		401	15.8	▲14.5
Turnout		2,535	66.0	▲24.9
Registered electors		3,842		
Conservative hold		Swing	▲7.2	

=== Blantyre West ===
Blantyre West
Party	Candidate	Votes	%	±%
Labour	M. McGlynn	1,338	59.7	▼3.3
SNP	H. Ferguson	676	30.2	▲10.2
Conservative	J. Stewart	226	10.1	New
Majority		662	29.6	▼13.4
Turnout		2,240	59.5	▲17.7
Registered electors		3,782		
Labour hold		Swing	▼6.7	

=== Coatshill/Low Blantyre ===
Coatshill/Low Blantyre
Party	Candidate	Votes	%	±%
Labour	J. Handibode	1,298	68.3	▲2.6
SNP	C. Sutherland	476	25.1	▲13.2
Conservative	M. Murray	126	6.6	New
Majority		822	43.3	▼0.1
Turnout		1,900	55.7	▲8.0
Registered electors		3,430		
Labour hold		Swing	▲1.3	

=== Burnbank/Blantyre ===
Burnbank/Blantyre
Party	Candidate	Votes	%
Labour	Davie McLachlan	1,333	63.8
SNP	P. Stewart	624	29.9
Conservative	A. Blair	131	6.3
Majority		709	34.0
Turnout		2,088	48.2
Registered electors		4,353	
Labour win (new seat)			

=== High Blantyre ===
High Blantyre
Party	Candidate	Votes	%	±%
Labour	H. Dunsmuir	1,237	60.9	▼3.2
SNP	J. Henderson	649	31.9	▼0.9
Conservative	N. Cameron	146	7.2	▲4.1
Majority		588	28.9	▼2.4
Turnout		2,032	56.4	▲12.6
Registered electors		3,620		
Labour hold		Swing	▼1.1	

=== Hamilton Centre North ===
Hamilton Centre North
Party	Candidate	Votes	%	±%
Labour	M. Smith	965	48.8	▼6.9
SNP	C. Bent	627	31.7	▲6.2
Conservative	J. Murray	386	19.5	▲0.8
Majority		338	17.8	▼12.4
Turnout		1,978	56.3	▲13.9
Registered electors		3,537		
Labour hold		Swing	▼6.5	

=== Whitehill ===
Whitehill
Party	Candidate	Votes	%	±%
Labour	J. Walls	947	57.2	▼20.2
SNP	J. Kaprot	543	32.8	▲15.5
Socialist Labour	C. Herriot	166	10.0	New
Majority		404	24.4	▼35.7
Turnout		1,656	47.9	▲9.3
Registered electors		3,538		
Labour hold		Swing	▼17.8	

=== Bothwell South ===
Bothwell South
Party	Candidate	Votes	%	±%
Labour	A. McGuire	810	41.3	▼8.3
SNP	K. Shaw	473	24.1	▼0.9
Conservative	R. Ferguson	467	23.8	▼1.6
Liberal Democrats	I. Strachan	209	10.7	New
Majority		337	17.2	▼7.0
Turnout		1,959	62.5	▲17.8
Registered electors		3,146		
Labour hold		Swing	▼3.7	

=== Uddingston South/Bothwell ===
Uddingston South/Bothwell
Party	Candidate	Votes	%	±%
Labour	J. Ormiston	986	51.4	▼6.6
Conservative	H. Mitchell	484	25.2	▲7.1
SNP	M. MacKenzie	450	23.4	▼0.5
Majority		502	26.1	▼8.2
Turnout		1,920	62.4	▲19.0
Registered electors		3,097		
Labour hold		Swing	▼6.8	

=== Uddingston ===
Uddingston North was renamed as Uddingston following the Third Statutory Reviews of Electoral Arrangements. There were minor changes to the boundaries.

Uddingston
Party	Candidate	Votes	%	±%
Labour	P. Morgan	967	50.9	▲11.4
SNP	J. Wright	491	25.9	▲12.4
Conservative	E. Montgomery	440	23.2	▲14.8
Majority		476	25.1	▲24.2
Turnout		1,898	59.3	▲13.0
Registered electors		3,194		
Labour hold		Swing	▲25.0	

=== Hillhouse ===
Hillhouse
Party	Candidate	Votes	%	±%
Labour	J. McKeown	1,021	65.2	▼1.5
SNP	D. Bryson	421	26.9	▼6.4
Conservative	D. Murray	125	8.0	New
Majority		600	38.3	▲5.0
Turnout		1,567	49.4	▲6.0
Registered electors		3,178		
Labour hold		Swing	▲2.4	

=== Udston ===
Udston
Party	Candidate	Votes	%	±%
Labour	J. Daisley	872	66.2	▼12.8
SNP	K. Prater	339	25.7	▲10.3
Conservative	A. Blair	107	8.1	▲2.6
Majority		533	40.4	▼23.2
Turnout		1,318	49.8	▲5.1
Registered electors		2,659		
Labour hold		Swing	▼11.6	

=== Wellhall/Earnock ===
Wellhall/Earnock
Party	Candidate	Votes	%	±%
Labour	Allan Falconer	1,372	80.7	▲17.5
SNP	J. Gardner	232	13.6	▼9.1
Conservative	D. Ballintine	96	5.6	▼8.5
Majority		1,140	67.1	▲26.6
Turnout		1,700	50.2	▲10.6
Registered electors		3,398		
Labour hold		Swing	▲13.3	

=== Earnock ===
Earnock
Party	Candidate	Votes	%	±%
Labour	M. Duffy	1,113	53.3	▲2.9
SNP	M. McKenzie	974	46.7	▲23.0
Majority		139	6.7	▼20.0
Turnout		2,087	59.7	▲21.0
Registered electors		3,630		
Labour hold		Swing	▼10.0	

=== Woodhead/Meikle Earnock ===
Laighstonehall/Woodhead was renamed as Woodhead/Meikle Earnock following the Third Statutory Reviews of Electoral Arrangements. There were small changes to the boundaries.

Woodhead/Meikle Earnock
Party	Candidate	Votes	%	±%
Labour	I. Stewart	1,186	64.5	▼16.1
SNP	H. McManus	524	28.5	▲9.1
Conservative	J. Brown	129	7.0	New
Majority		662	36.0	▼25.2
Turnout		1,839	53.4	▲18.6
Registered electors		3,466		
Labour hold		Swing	▼12.6	

=== Hamilton Centre/Ferniegair ===
Hamilton Centre/Ferniegair
Party	Candidate	Votes	%	±%
Labour	Mary Smith	948	46.3	▼3.6
Conservative	C. Brown	584	28.5	▼4.7
SNP	A. Coventry	515	25.2	▲8.2
Majority		364	17.8	▲1.1
Turnout		2,047	59.5	▲14.8
Registered electors		3,457		
Labour hold		Swing	▲0.5	

=== Low Waters ===
Low Waters
Party	Candidate	Votes	%	±%
Labour	Joe Lowe	1,343	68.8	▲2.5
SNP	G. Neilson	460	23.6	▼0.9
Conservative	D. Thomas	148	7.6	▼1.6
Majority		883	45.3	▲3.4
Turnout		1,951	54.6	▲9.0
Registered electors		3,580		
Labour hold		Swing	▲1.7	

=== Silvertonhill ===
Silvertonhill
Party	Candidate	Votes	%	±%
Labour	R. Smith	854	34.6	▼4.2
SNP	R. Lawson	831	33.7	▼13.0
Conservative	A. Kegg	489	19.8	▲3.3
Liberal Democrats	J. Oswald	294	11.9	New
Majority		23	0.9	N/A
Turnout		2,468	68.8	▲16.6
Registered electors		3,596		
Labour gain from SNP		Swing	▲4.4	

=== Cadzow ===
Cadzow
Party	Candidate	Votes	%	±%
Labour	E. Handibode	1,278	57.1	▼3.7
SNP	W. Neary	689	30.8	▼5.7
Conservative	H. Mackie	272	12.1	▲9.4
Majority		589	26.3	▲2.0
Turnout		2,239	58.0	▼0.4
Registered electors		3,880		
Labour hold		Swing	▲1.0	

=== Dalserf ===
Dalserf
Party	Candidate	Votes	%	±%
Labour	M. Ahmad	1,192	55.7	▼8.2
SNP	L. MacDonald	947	44.3	▲8.2
Majority		245	11.5	▼16.4
Turnout		2,139	56.3	▲14.9
Registered electors		3,852		
Labour hold		Swing	▼8.2	

=== Larkhall East ===
Larkhall East
Party	Candidate	Votes	%	±%
Labour	R. Ferguson	1,319	61.7	▲1.6
SNP	P. Craig	820	38.3	▼1.6
Majority		499	23.3	▲3.2
Turnout		2,139	55.6	▲14.8
Registered electors		3,886		
Labour hold		Swing	▲1.6	

=== Larkhall West ===
Larkhall West
Party	Candidate	Votes	%	±%
Labour	L. Craw	1,139	58.1	▼8.9
SNP	I. McGowan	823	41.9	▲8.9
Majority		316	16.1	▼17.8
Turnout		1,962	53.6	▲12.4
Registered electors		3,738		
Labour hold		Swing	▼8.9	

=== Larkhall South ===
Larkhall South
Party	Candidate	Votes	%	±%
Labour	Jackie Burns	1,264	66.9	▼9.3
SNP	R. Murray	626	33.1	▲9.3
Majority		638	33.8	▼18.6
Turnout		1,890	54.3	▲10.1
Registered electors		3,529		
Labour hold		Swing	▼9.3	

=== Stonehouse ===
Stonehouse
Party	Candidate	Votes	%	±%
Labour	R. Gibb	1,039	48.8	▼12.8
SNP	J. Young	867	40.7	▲2.3
Conservative	E. Colley	224	10.5	New
Majority		172	8.1	▼15.1
Turnout		2,130	63.6	▲15.1
Registered electors		3,352		
Labour hold		Swing	▼7.5	

=== Rutherglen West ===
Rutherglen West
Party	Candidate	Votes	%	±%
Labour	Denis McKenna	1,013	55.9	▼15.9
SNP	E. Findlay	551	30.4	▲11.2
Liberal Democrats	John McLellan	248	13.7	▲4.7
Majority		462	25.5	▼27.1
Turnout		1,812	50.3	▲8.4
Registered electors		3,635		
Labour hold		Swing	▼13.5	

=== Stonelaw ===
Stonelaw
Party	Candidate	Votes	%	±%
Liberal Democrats	Gretel Ross	1,334	58.5	▲2.0
Labour	M. McCool	416	18.2	▼7.1
SNP	Sherwood Shea	333	14.6	▲2.6
Conservative	Jean Miller	199	8.7	▲2.5
Majority		918	40.2	▲9.0
Turnout		2,282	63.1	▲14.3
Registered electors		3,619		
Liberal Democrats hold		Swing	▲4.5	

=== Bankhead ===
Bankhead
Party	Candidate	Votes	%	±%
Labour	Eddie McAvoy	1,301	59.1	▲14.5
SNP	Alistair Fulton	482	21.9	▲7.9
Liberal Democrats	Charles Clark	282	12.8	▼23.4
Conservative	I. Raeburn	135	6.1	▼0.1
Majority		819	37.2	▲28.8
Turnout		2,200	61.1	▲12.8
Registered electors		3,601		
Labour hold		Swing	▲18.9	

=== Spittal/Blairbeth ===
Spittal/Blairbeth
Party	Candidate	Votes	%	±%
Labour	William McCaig	1,152	50.4	▲1.4
Liberal Democrats	R. McGregor	656	28.7	▼13.4
SNP	D. Hamilton	306	13.4	▲4.5
Conservative	A. Kenneth	173	7.6	New
Majority		496	21.7	▲14.8
Turnout		2,287	64.9	▲11.9
Registered electors		3,536		
Labour hold		Swing	▲7.4	

=== Burgh ===
Burgh
Party	Candidate	Votes	%	±%
Labour	Brian McKenna	1,005	48.9	▼9.4
Liberal Democrats	Elizabeth Jackson	476	23.2	▼5.5
SNP	R. Richardson	448	21.8	▲8.8
Conservative	R. Gilchrist	127	6.2	New
Majority		529	25.7	▼3.9
Turnout		2,056	55.0	▲8.8
Registered electors		3,744		
Labour hold		Swing	▼1.9	

=== Cairns ===
Cairns
Party	Candidate	Votes	%	±%
Labour	Pam Clearie	1,092	55.6	▼17.5
SNP	John Higgins	489	24.9	▲9.5
Liberal Democrats	E. Fox	187	9.5	▲3.0
Conservative	S. Raeburn	119	6.1	New
Socialist Labour	J. Brown	77	3.9	New
Majority		603	30.7	▼27.0
Turnout		1,964	55.2	▲14.3
Registered electors		3,570		
Labour hold		Swing	▼13.5	

=== Hallside ===
Hallside
Party	Candidate	Votes	%	±%
Labour	Davy Keirs	1,174	65.3	▼10.8
SNP	Anne Higgins	416	23.1	▲5.2
Liberal Democrats	John Rodgers	120	6.7	▲0.7
Conservative	Robina Muir	88	4.9	New
Majority		758	42.2	▼16.0
Turnout		1,798	55.5	▲11.1
Registered electors		3,250		
Labour hold		Swing	▼8.0	

=== Cambuslang Central ===
Cambuslang Central
Party	Candidate	Votes	%	±%
Labour	Bob Rooney	1,231	60.3	▼9.8
SNP	Clare McColl	439	21.5	▼3.0
Liberal Democrats	Karen MacCallum	188	9.2	▲3.8
Conservative	Ronald Muir	184	9.0	New
Majority		792	38.8	▼6.8
Turnout		2,042	57.6	▲9.4
Registered electors		3,554		
Labour hold		Swing	▼3.4	

=== Cathkin/Springhall ===
Cathkin/Springhall
Party	Candidate	Votes	%	±%
Labour	Russell Clearie	1,114	50.5	▲2.4
Liberal Democrats	J. Costello	714	32.4	▼7.7
SNP	I. McColl	378	17.1	▲5.3
Majority		400	18.1	▲10.1
Turnout		2,206	59.4	▲9.2
Registered electors		3,712		
Labour hold		Swing	▲5.0	

=== Fernhill ===
Fernhill
Party	Candidate	Votes	%	±%
Labour	M. Caldwell	834	44.4	▼11.0
Liberal Democrats	J. McCutcheon	682	36.3	▲12.8
SNP	D. Whyteside	364	19.4	▼1.7
Majority		152	8.1	▼23.8
Turnout		1,880	56.8	▲3.6
Registered electors		3,321		
Labour hold		Swing	▼11.9	

=== Kirkhill/Whitlawburn ===
Kirkhill/Whitlawburn
Party	Candidate	Votes	%	±%
Labour	Patrick McKenna	842	39.9	▼2.0
Liberal Democrats	G. Chapman	682	32.3	▼5.3
SNP	H. Ross	357	16.9	▲2.4
Conservative	R. Miller	228	10.8	▲4.7
Majority		160	7.6	▲3.3
Turnout		2,109	55.8	▲12.0
Registered electors		3,786		
Labour hold		Swing	▲1.6	

=== Eastfield ===
Eastfield
Party	Candidate	Votes	%	±%
Labour	John McGuinness	1,232	54.7	▼12.3
SNP	Gordon Clark	480	21.3	▲0.1
Liberal Democrats	David Baillie	304	13.5	▲1.6
Conservative	J. Fisher	235	10.4	New
Majority		752	33.4	▼12.4
Turnout		2,251	64.2	▲15.6
Registered electors		3,509		
Labour hold		Swing	▼6.2	
