= 1999 North Lanarkshire Council election =

1999 Scottish Local Election

Map showing results by ward.

Elections to North Lanarkshire Council were held on 6 May 1999, the same day as the other Scottish local government elections and the Scottish Parliament general election.

== Election results ==
North Lanarkshire local election result 1999
| Party | Seats | Gains | Losses | Net gain/loss | Seats % | Votes % | Votes | +/− |
|---|---|---|---|---|---|---|---|---|
| Labour | 56 | 0 | 1 | -1 | 80.0 | 54.7 | 78,802 | |
| SNP | 12 | 2 | 0 | +2 | 17.1 | 36.0 | 51,860 | |
| Conservative | 0 | 0 | 0 | ±0 | 0.0 | 4.4 | 6,373 | |
| Liberal Democrats | 0 | 0 | 0 | ±0 | 0.0 | 1.8 | 2,535 | |
| Scottish Socialist | 0 | 0 | 0 | ±0 | 0.0 | 0.4 | 647 | |
| Independent | 2 | 0 | 0 | ±0 | 2.9 | 2.7 | 3,950 | |

== Ward results ==
Ladywell
| Party | Candidate | Votes | % | ±% |
|---|---|---|---|---|
| Labour Co-op | Michael Ross | 933 | 37.6 | |
| SNP | Alan Sneddon | 831 | 33.5 | |
| Conservative | Robert Burgess | 716 | 28.9 | |
| Majority | | 102 | 4.1 | |
| Turnout | | 2,480 | 64.53 | |
| Labour Co-op hold | | Swing | | |

Calder Valley
| Party | Candidate | Votes | % | ±% |
|---|---|---|---|---|
| Labour | Vincent Mathieson | 1,233 | 58.3 | |
| SNP | Denis Colvin | 650 | 30.7 | |
| Conservative | William Millar | 232 | 11.0 | |
| Majority | | 583 | 27.6 | |
| Turnout | | 2,480 | 58.83 | |
| Labour hold | | Swing | | |

Forgewood
| Party | Candidate | Votes | % | ±% |
|---|---|---|---|---|
| Labour | Patrick Connelly | 878 | 50.3 | |
| SNP | Alexander Law | 721 | 41.3 | |
| Conservative | Christina Giggie | 148 | 8.5 | |
| Majority | | 157 | 9.0 | |
| Turnout | | 2,480 | 50.60 | |
| Labour hold | | Swing | | |

North Motherwell
| Party | Candidate | Votes | % | ±% |
|---|---|---|---|---|
| Labour | William Martin | 1,156 | 57.7 | |
| SNP | Raymond Richmond | 623 | 31.1 | |
| Conservative | Robert Paterson | 224 | 11.2 | |
| Majority | | 533 | 26.6 | |
| Turnout | | 2,003 | 55.78 | |
| Labour hold | | Swing | | |

New Stevenston and Carfin
| Party | Candidate | Votes | % | ±% |
|---|---|---|---|---|
| Labour | Bernard Scott | 1,092 | 53.3 | |
| SNP | John E McLellan | 806 | 39.3 | |
| Conservative | James McKinley | 151 | 7.4 | |
| Majority | | 286 | 14.0 | |
| Turnout | | 2,480 | 60.50 | |
| Labour hold | | Swing | | |

Craigneuk
| Party | Candidate | Votes | % | ±% |
|---|---|---|---|---|
| Labour | Thomas Lunny | 1,053 | 67.4 | |
| SNP | Charles Dyer | 441 | 28.2 | |
| Conservative | June Millar | 69 | 4.4 | |
| Majority | | 612 | 39.2 | |
| Turnout | | 1,563 | 49.56 | |
| Labour hold | | Swing | | |

Belhaven
| Party | Candidate | Votes | % | ±% |
|---|---|---|---|---|
| Labour | Samuel Love | 853 | 43.0 | |
| SNP | Michelle Boyd | 823 | 41.5 | |
| Conservative | Margaret Hooper | 308 | 15.5 | |
| Majority | | 30 | 1.5 | |
| Turnout | | 1,984 | 57.37 | |
| Labour hold | | Swing | | |

Stewarton
| Party | Candidate | Votes | % | ±% |
|---|---|---|---|---|
| Labour | John Moran | 988 | 50.8 | |
| SNP | Scott Harvie | 599 | 30.8 | |
| Conservative | Carole McKinley | 192 | 9.9 | |
| Independent | Kevin Pearson | 166 | 8.5 | |
| Majority | | 389 | 20.0 | |
| Turnout | | 1,945 | 52.62 | |
| Labour hold | | Swing | | |

Cambusnethan
| Party | Candidate | Votes | % | ±% |
|---|---|---|---|---|
| Labour | Thomas Selfridge | 898 | 41.0 | |
| SNP | John Taggart | 827 | 37.8 | |
| Conservative | William Gibson | 291 | 13.3 | |
| Liberal Democrats | Paul Kirk | 172 | 7.9 | |
| Majority | | 71 | 3.2 | |
| Turnout | | 2,188 | 60.64 | |
| Labour hold | | Swing | | |

Coltness
| Party | Candidate | Votes | % | ±% |
|---|---|---|---|---|
| Labour | Ernest Holloway | 1,095 | 53.2 | |
| SNP | John Johnston | 725 | 35.2 | |
| Conservative | Sarah Bishop | 239 | 11.6 | |
| Majority | | 370 | 18.0 | |
| Turnout | | 2,059 | 59.98 | |
| Labour hold | | Swing | | |

Watsonville
| Party | Candidate | Votes | % | ±% |
|---|---|---|---|---|
| SNP | Alan Valentine | 848 | 40.1 | |
| Labour | Daniel Howley | 836 | 39.5 | |
| Conservative | Neil Richardson | 241 | 11.4 | |
| Liberal Democrats | John R Best | 190 | 9.0 | |
| Majority | | 12 | 0.6 | |
| Turnout | | 2,115 | 58.93 | |
| SNP gain from Labour | | Swing | | |

Knowetop
| Party | Candidate | Votes | % | ±% |
|---|---|---|---|---|
| Labour | William Wilson | 1,140 | 52.3 | |
| SNP | David Frame | 722 | 33.1 | |
| Conservative | Andrew Laughlan | 316 | 14.5 | |
| Majority | | 418 | 19.2 | |
| Turnout | | 2,178 | 60.17 | |
| Labour hold | | Swing | | |

Muirhouse and Netherton
| Party | Candidate | Votes | % | ±% |
|---|---|---|---|---|
| Labour | Gerard McLaughlin | 1,026 | 56.8 | |
| SNP | James Russell | 641 | 35.5 | |
| Conservative | Isabella Burgess | 138 | 7.6 | |
| Majority | | 385 | 21.3 | |
| Turnout | | 1,805 | 54.37 | |
| Labour hold | | Swing | | |

Pather and Gowkthrapple
| Party | Candidate | Votes | % | ±% |
|---|---|---|---|---|
| Labour | John F McGhee | 1,116 | 62.1 | |
| SNP | Irene Hume | 589 | 32.8 | |
| Conservative | David L Gurr | 91 | 5.1 | |
| Majority | | 527 | 29.3 | |
| Turnout | | 1,796 | 49.37 | |
| Labour hold | | Swing | | |

Garrion
| Party | Candidate | Votes | % | ±% |
|---|---|---|---|---|
| Labour | John Pentland | 1,059 | 49.8 | |
| SNP | James Hume | 802 | 37.7 | |
| Conservative | Elizabeth Gallacher | 266 | 12.5 | |
| Majority | | 257 | 12.1 | |
| Turnout | | 2,127 | 59.90 | |
| Labour hold | | Swing | | |

Newmains
| Party | Candidate | Votes | % | ±% |
|---|---|---|---|---|
| Independent | David McKendrick | 1,209 | 56.5 | |
| Independent | Robert McKendrick | 569 | 26.6 | |
| Labour | Hugh McGinley | 363 | 17.0 | |
| Majority | | 640 | 29.9 | |
| Turnout | | 2,141 | 62.70 | |
| Independent hold | | Swing | | |

Stane
| Party | Candidate | Votes | % | ±% |
|---|---|---|---|---|
| Labour | Frank Gormill | 1,394 | 65.9 | |
| SNP | Malcolm McMillan | 721 | 34.1 | |
| Majority | | 673 | 31.8 | |
| Turnout | | 2,115 | 56.83 | |
| Labour hold | | Swing | | |

Dykehead
| Party | Candidate | Votes | % | ±% |
|---|---|---|---|---|
| Labour | James Robertson | 1,223 | 66.2 | |
| SNP | David Robb | 626 | 33.9 | |
| Majority | | 597 | 32.3 | |
| Turnout | | 1,849 | 53.96 | |
| Labour hold | | Swing | | |

Cleland
| Party | Candidate | Votes | % | ±% |
|---|---|---|---|---|
| Labour | James Martin | 1,608 | 77.2 | |
| SNP | Michael Carroll | 474 | 22.8 | |
| Majority | | 1,134 | 54.4 | |
| Turnout | | 2,082 | 57.94 | |
| Labour hold | | Swing | | |

Benhar
| Party | Candidate | Votes | % | ±% |
|---|---|---|---|---|
| Independent | Charles Cefferty | 1,182 | 53.1 | |
| Labour | Elizabeth Wilson | 658 | 29.5 | |
| SNP | David Baird | 387 | 17.4 | |
| Majority | | 524 | 23.5 | |
| Turnout | | 2,227 | 62.37 | |
| Independent hold | | Swing | | |

Tannochside
| Party | Candidate | Votes | % | ±% |
|---|---|---|---|---|
| Labour | David Saunders | 1,384 | 57.5 | |
| SNP | Linda E Muir | 681 | 28.3 | |
| Conservative | Gordon McIntosh | 340 | 14.1 | |
| Majority | | 703 | 29.2 | |
| Turnout | | 2,405 | 60.50 | |
| Labour hold | | Swing | | |

Fallside
| Party | Candidate | Votes | % | ±% |
|---|---|---|---|---|
| Labour | Charles Hebenton | 1,314 | 64.0 | |
| SNP | Cliff Thomson | 555 | 27.0 | |
| Conservative | Lyndsay J McIntosh | 183 | 8.9 | |
| Majority | | 759 | 37.0 | |
| Turnout | | 2,052 | 52.25 | |
| Labour hold | | Swing | | |

Viewpark
| Party | Candidate | Votes | % | ±% |
|---|---|---|---|---|
| Labour | James McCabe | 1,495 | 72.1 | |
| SNP | John Gilmour | 578 | 27.9 | |
| Majority | | 917 | 44.2 | |
| Turnout | | 2,073 | 53.54 | |
| Labour hold | | Swing | | |

Bellshill North
| Party | Candidate | Votes | % | ±% |
|---|---|---|---|---|
| Labour | Henry McGuigan | 1,254 | 53.8 | |
| SNP | Duncan McShannon | 912 | 39.1 | |
| Conservative | Elizabeth McLeod | 167 | 7.2 | |
| Majority | | 342 | 14.7 | |
| Turnout | | 2,333 | 62.07 | |
| Labour hold | | Swing | | |

Orbiston
| Party | Candidate | Votes | % | ±% |
|---|---|---|---|---|
| SNP | Richard Lyle | 1,583 | 69.6 | |
| Labour | Francis McDonagh | 691 | 30.4 | |
| Majority | | 892 | 39.2 | |
| Turnout | | 2,274 | 61.13 | |
| SNP hold | | Swing | | |

Mossend West and Thorndean
| Party | Candidate | Votes | % | ±% |
|---|---|---|---|---|
| Labour | Joseph Gorman | 1,036 | 47.6 | |
| SNP | Marie Mockus | 969 | 44.5 | |
| Conservative | James McLeod | 171 | 7.9 | |
| Majority | | 67 | 3.1 | |
| Turnout | | 2,176 | 56.54 | |
| Labour hold | | Swing | | |

Holytown
| Party | Candidate | Votes | % | ±% |
|---|---|---|---|---|
| Labour | James Coyle | 1,499 | 69.5 | |
| SNP | Elspeth Hudson | 455 | 21.1 | |
| Conservative | James Paterson | 204 | 9.5 | |
| Majority | | 1,044 | 48.4 | |
| Turnout | | 2,158 | 57.09 | |
| Labour hold | | Swing | | |

Mossend East and New Stevenston North
| Party | Candidate | Votes | % | ±% |
|---|---|---|---|---|
| Labour | Kevin McKeown | 962 | 50.7 | |
| SNP | Kathleen McAlorum | 935 | 49.3 | |
| Majority | | 27 | 1.4 | |
| Turnout | | 1,897 | 54.16 | |
| Labour hold | | Swing | | |

Newarthill
| Party | Candidate | Votes | % | ±% |
|---|---|---|---|---|
| Labour | John Lafferty | 1,410 | 69.0 | |
| SNP | Richard Campbell | 633 | 31.0 | |
| Majority | | 777 | 38.0 | |
| Turnout | | 2,043 | 55.14 | |
| Labour hold | | Swing | | |

Hattonrigg
| Party | Candidate | Votes | % | ±% |
|---|---|---|---|---|
| Labour | Harry Curran | 1,223 | 57.4 | |
| SNP | Russell Cook | 710 | 33.3 | |
| Conservative | George Clark | 198 | 9.3 | |
| Majority | | 513 | 24.1 | |
| Turnout | | 2,131 | 55.76 | |
| Labour hold | | Swing | | |

Townhead
| Party | Candidate | Votes | % | ±% |
|---|---|---|---|---|
| Labour | Anthony Clarke | 1,230 | 67.5 | |
| SNP | Eric Martin | 591 | 32.5 | |
| Majority | | 639 | 35.1 | |
| Turnout | | 1,821 | 54.63 | |
| Labour hold | | Swing | | |

Blairpark
| Party | Candidate | Votes | % | ±% |
|---|---|---|---|---|
| Labour | William Shields | 1,079 | 49.4 | |
| SNP | Stephen McGinty | 629 | 28.8 | |
| Conservative | Gordon Lind | 475 | 21.8 | |
| Majority | | 450 | 20.6 | |
| Turnout | | 2,183 | 60.94 | |
| Labour hold | | Swing | | |

North Central and Glenboig
| Party | Candidate | Votes | % | ±% |
|---|---|---|---|---|
| Labour | James McKinlay | 1,442 | 66.4 | |
| SNP | Sophia Coyle | 729 | 33.6 | |
| Majority | | 713 | 32.8 | |
| Turnout | | 2,171 | 55.04 | |
| Labour hold | | Swing | | |

Coatbridge Central
| Party | Candidate | Votes | % | ±% |
|---|---|---|---|---|
| Labour | Thomas Nolan | 1,239 | 60.3 | |
| SNP | Martin McWilliams | 596 | 29.0 | |
| Conservative | Alexander Thornton | 220 | 10.7 | |
| Majority | | 643 | 31.3 | |
| Turnout | | 2,055 | 53.87 | |
| Labour hold | | Swing | | |

Sikeside and Carnbroe
| Party | Candidate | Votes | % | ±% |
|---|---|---|---|---|
| Labour | John Cassidy | 990 | 55.6 | |
| SNP | James Gribben | 522 | 29.3 | |
| Independent | Gerald Somers | 267 | 15.0 | |
| Majority | | 468 | 26.3 | |
| Turnout | | 1,779 | 56.47 | |
| Labour hold | | Swing | | |

Bargeddie and Langloan
| Party | Candidate | Votes | % | ±% |
|---|---|---|---|---|
| Labour | Andrew Burns | 1,202 | 67.7 | |
| SNP | Heather Watt | 574 | 32.3 | |
| Majority | | 628 | 35.4 | |
| Turnout | | 1,776 | 50.98 | |
| Labour hold | | Swing | | |

Kirkwood
| Party | Candidate | Votes | % | ±% |
|---|---|---|---|---|
| Labour | James Smith | 1,515 | 77.7 | |
| SNP | Maureen Hagerty | 436 | 22.3 | |
| Majority | | 1,079 | 55.3 | |
| Turnout | | 1,951 | 53.96 | |
| Labour hold | | Swing | | |

Kirkshaws
| Party | Candidate | Votes | % | ±% |
|---|---|---|---|---|
| Labour | John Gordon | 1,487 | 77.4 | |
| SNP | Philip Sands | 434 | 22.6 | |
| Majority | | 1,053 | 54.8 | |
| Turnout | | 1,921 | 54.77 | |
| Labour hold | | Swing | | |

Shawhead
| Party | Candidate | Votes | % | ±% |
|---|---|---|---|---|
| Labour | James Brooks | 1,428 | 74.0 | |
| SNP | Colin Hagerty | 502 | 26.0 | |
| Majority | | 926 | 48.0 | |
| Turnout | | 1,930 | 56.35 | |
| Labour hold | | Swing | | |

Old Monkland
| Party | Candidate | Votes | % | ±% |
|---|---|---|---|---|
| Labour | Thomas Maginnis | 1,413 | 79.5 | |
| SNP | J David McIntosh | 364 | 20.5 | |
| Majority | | 1,049 | 59.0 | |
| Turnout | | 1,777 | 55.71 | |
| Labour hold | | Swing | | |

Whinhall
| Party | Candidate | Votes | % | ±% |
|---|---|---|---|---|
| Labour | George Devine | 1,209 | 64.6 | |
| SNP | Alan White | 663 | 35.4 | |
| Majority | | 546 | 29.2 | |
| Turnout | | 1,872 | 51.11 | |
| Labour hold | | Swing | | |

Academy
| Party | Candidate | Votes | % | ±% |
|---|---|---|---|---|
| Labour | James McGuigan | 953 | 46.9 | |
| Independent | Patrick Rolink | 557 | 27.4 | |
| SNP | Michael Coyle | 521 | 25.7 | |
| Majority | | 396 | 19.5 | |
| Turnout | | 2,031 | 57.94 | |
| Labour hold | | Swing | | |

Airdrie Central
| Party | Candidate | Votes | % | ±% |
|---|---|---|---|---|
| Labour | James Logue | 1,337 | 68.9 | |
| SNP | Bruce Wilson | 603 | 31.1 | |
| Majority | | 734 | 37.8 | |
| Turnout | | 1,940 | 55.90 | |
| Labour hold | | Swing | | |

Clarkston
| Party | Candidate | Votes | % | ±% |
|---|---|---|---|---|
| SNP | Campbell Cameron | 877 | 44.0 | |
| Labour | David Moon | 632 | 31.7 | |
| Conservative | Peter Russell | 277 | 13.9 | |
| Liberal Democrats | John Love | 205 | 10.3 | |
| Majority | | 245 | 12.3 | |
| Turnout | | 1,991 | 54.38 | |
| SNP hold | | Swing | | |

New Monkland West
| Party | Candidate | Votes | % | ±% |
|---|---|---|---|---|
| SNP | Sandra Cox | 1,211 | 61.6 | |
| Labour | Helen McGroarty | 756 | 38.4 | |
| Majority | | 455 | 23.1 | |
| Turnout | | 1,967 | 50.30 | |
| SNP hold | | Swing | | |

Plains and Caldercruix
| Party | Candidate | Votes | % | ±% |
|---|---|---|---|---|
| Labour | Thomas Morgan | 1,523 | 74.2 | |
| SNP | Martha White | 530 | 25.8 | |
| Majority | | 993 | 48.4 | |
| Turnout | | 2,053 | 59.69 | |
| Labour hold | | Swing | | |

North Cairnhill and Coatdyke
| Party | Candidate | Votes | % | ±% |
|---|---|---|---|---|
| Labour | Peter Sullivan | 1,325 | 64.2 | |
| SNP | Margaret Lynch | 530 | 25.7 | |
| Liberal Democrats | Elizabeth McSkimming | 209 | 10.1 | |
| Majority | | 795 | 38.5 | |
| Turnout | | 2,064 | 59.34 | |
| Labour hold | | Swing | | |

South East Cairnhill and Gartlea
| Party | Candidate | Votes | % | ±% |
|---|---|---|---|---|
| SNP | David Stocks | 974 | 47.7 | |
| Labour | Owen Donnelly | 774 | 37.9 | |
| Liberal Democrats | Patricia McGuire | 294 | 14.4 | |
| Majority | | 200 | 9.8 | |
| Turnout | | 2,042 | 56.33 | |
| SNP hold | | Swing | | |

Craigneuk and Petersburn
| Party | Candidate | Votes | % | ±% |
|---|---|---|---|---|
| Labour | Donna Morris | 935 | 54.5 | |
| SNP | John Murphy | 780 | 45.5 | |
| Majority | | 155 | 9.0 | |
| Turnout | | 1,715 | 50.10 | |
| Labour hold | | Swing | | |

Calderbank
| Party | Candidate | Votes | % | ±% |
|---|---|---|---|---|
| Labour | Patrick Donnelly | 1,064 | 52.7 | |
| SNP | William Walker | 592 | 29.3 | |
| Liberal Democrats | Elizabeth McIntyre | 362 | 17.9 | |
| Majority | | 472 | 23.4 | |
| Turnout | | 2,018 | 64.07 | |
| Labour hold | | Swing | | |

Chapelhall
| Party | Candidate | Votes | % | ±% |
|---|---|---|---|---|
| Labour | Tom Curley | 1,229 | 66.3 | |
| SNP | Keith Gibb | 625 | 33.7 | |
| Majority | | 604 | 32.6 | |
| Turnout | | 1,854 | 57.01 | |
| Labour hold | | Swing | | |

Salsburgh
| Party | Candidate | Votes | % | ±% |
|---|---|---|---|---|
| Labour | Brian Brady | 1,035 | 55.7 | |
| SNP | John Walker | 574 | 30.9 | |
| Conservative | Laurence Cameron | 250 | 13.4 | |
| Majority | | 461 | 24.8 | |
| Turnout | | 1,859 | 56.42 | |
| Labour hold | | Swing | | |

Kildrum and Park
| Party | Candidate | Votes | % | ±% |
|---|---|---|---|---|
| SNP | Margaret Murray | 1,197 | 49.6 | |
| Labour | Allan Graham | 981 | 40.7 | |
| Liberal Democrats | Charles Conlon | 126 | 5.2 | |
| Scottish Socialist | Andrew Locke | 108 | 4.5 | |
| Majority | | 216 | 9.0 | |
| Turnout | | 2,412 | 64.41 | |
| SNP hold | | Swing | | |

Seafar and The Village
| Party | Candidate | Votes | % | ±% |
|---|---|---|---|---|
| SNP | Daniel McCallum | 1,162 | 51.1 | |
| Labour | Stephen V. Murray | 995 | 43.7 | |
| Liberal Democrats | Henry Clifford | 119 | 5.2 | |
| Majority | | 167 | 7.3 | |
| Turnout | | 2,276 | 51.53 | |
| SNP hold | | Swing | | |

Balloch East and Ravenswood
| Party | Candidate | Votes | % | ±% |
|---|---|---|---|---|
| SNP | Euphemia Glavin | 1,122 | 46.2 | |
| Labour | James McKenna | 1,069 | 44.0 | |
| Liberal Democrats | George Swift | 238 | 9.8 | |
| Majority | | 53 | 2.2 | |
| Turnout | | 2,429 | 65.04 | |
| SNP hold | | Swing | | |

Balloch West, Blackwood East and Craigmarloch
| Party | Candidate | Votes | % | ±% |
|---|---|---|---|---|
| Labour | Barry McCulloch | 1,272 | 62.8 | |
| SNP | Fiona McGlashan | 754 | 37.2 | |
| Majority | | 518 | 25.6 | |
| Turnout | | 2,026 | 59.46 | |
| Labour hold | | Swing | | |

Westerwood, Carrickstone and Dullatur
| Party | Candidate | Votes | % | ±% |
|---|---|---|---|---|
| SNP | Gordon Murray | 997 | 55.9 | |
| Labour | Maria Murray | 785 | 44.1 | |
| Majority | | 212 | 11.9 | |
| Turnout | | 1,782 | 58.34 | |
| SNP hold | | Swing | | |

Abronhill South
| Party | Candidate | Votes | % | ±% |
|---|---|---|---|---|
| SNP | William Carmichael | 1,233 | 57.0 | |
| Labour | Elizabeth Hughes | 929 | 43.0 | |
| Majority | | 304 | 14.1 | |
| Turnout | | 2,162 | 60.10 | |
| SNP hold | | Swing | | |

Abronhill Central and North
| Party | Candidate | Votes | % | ±% |
|---|---|---|---|---|
| SNP | Elizabeth Irvine | 1,118 | 47.5 | |
| Labour | Anthony Beekman | 1,013 | 43.0 | |
| Liberal Democrats | Carol Boyle | 223 | 9.5 | |
| Majority | | 105 | 4.5 | |
| Turnout | | 2,354 | 61.55 | |
| SNP hold | | Swing | | |

Carbrain East
| Party | Candidate | Votes | % | ±% |
|---|---|---|---|---|
| SNP | William Homer | 995 | 49.9 | |
| Labour | Eamon Monaghan | 847 | 42.5 | |
| Scottish Socialist | Kevin P McVey | 151 | 7.6 | |
| Majority | | 148 | 7.4 | |
| Turnout | | 1,993 | 54.49 | |
| SNP hold | | Swing | | |

Carbrain West and Greenfaulds
| Party | Candidate | Votes | % | ±% |
|---|---|---|---|---|
| Labour | Stephen Grant | 1,089 | 48.2 | |
| SNP | Sandra Smith | 1,036 | 45.8 | |
| Scottish Socialist | Kenneth McEwan | 135 | 6.0 | |
| Majority | | 53 | 2.3 | |
| Turnout | | 2,260 | 62.83 | |
| Labour hold | | Swing | | |

Condorrat Central
| Party | Candidate | Votes | % | ±% |
|---|---|---|---|---|
| Labour | Gerald McElroy | 1,356 | 57.5 | |
| SNP | Edward Laughlan | 1,004 | 42.5 | |
| Majority | | 352 | 15.0 | |
| Turnout | | 2,360 | 63.05 | |
| Labour hold | | Swing | | |

Condorrat North and Westfield
| Party | Candidate | Votes | % | ±% |
|---|---|---|---|---|
| Labour | Balwant Singh Chadha | 1,163 | 48.4 | |
| SNP | David McGlashan | 1,025 | 42.6 | |
| Liberal Democrats | Hugh O'Donnell | 217 | 9.0 | |
| Majority | | 138 | 5.7 | |
| Turnout | | 2,405 | 63.08 | |
| Labour hold | | Swing | | |

Croy, Kilsyth South and Smithstone
| Party | Candidate | Votes | % | ±% |
|---|---|---|---|---|
| Labour | Francis Griffin | 1,155 | 68.6 | |
| SNP | John Roy | 428 | 25.4 | |
| Scottish Socialist | William O'Neill | 101 | 6.0 | |
| Majority | | 727 | 43.2 | |
| Turnout | | 1,684 | 58.70 | |
| Labour hold | | Swing | | |

Queenzieburn and Kilsyth West
| Party | Candidate | Votes | % | ±% |
|---|---|---|---|---|
| Labour | Jean Jones | 1,244 | 58.8 | |
| SNP | Colin Johnstone | 873 | 41.2 | |
| Majority | | 371 | 17.5 | |
| Turnout | | 2,117 | 61.99 | |
| Labour hold | | Swing | | |

Banton and Kilsyth East
| Party | Candidate | Votes | % | ±% |
|---|---|---|---|---|
| Labour | Tom Barrie | 1,196 | 58.4 | |
| SNP | Colin Barrie | 853 | 41.6 | |
| Majority | | 343 | 16.7 | |
| Turnout | | 2,049 | 62.98 | |
| Labour hold | | Swing | | |

Moodiesburn East and Blackwood West
| Party | Candidate | Votes | % | ±% |
|---|---|---|---|---|
| Labour | William Hogg | 1,044 | 55.3 | |
| SNP | Ronald McCambridge | 692 | 36.7 | |
| Scottish Socialist | Marion Paterson | 152 | 8.1 | |
| Majority | | 352 | 18.6 | |
| Turnout | | 1,888 | 59.03 | |
| Labour hold | | Swing | | |

Moodiesburn West and Gartcosh
| Party | Candidate | Votes | % | ±% |
|---|---|---|---|---|
| Labour | Joseph Shaw | 1,099 | 59.9 | |
| SNP | Janet Adam | 556 | 30.3 | |
| Liberal Democrats | Glen Wilson | 180 | 9.8 | |
| Majority | | 543 | 29.6 | |
| Turnout | | 1,835 | 55.82 | |
| Labour hold | | Swing | | |

Chryston and Auchinloch
| Party | Candidate | Votes | % | ±% |
|---|---|---|---|---|
| Labour | Charles Gray | 1,433 | 70.7 | |
| SNP | Alan A. Caldwell | 594 | 29.3 | |
| Majority | | 839 | 41.4 | |
| Turnout | | 2,027 | 63.12 | |
| Labour hold | | Swing | | |

Stepps
| Party | Candidate | Votes | % | ±% |
|---|---|---|---|---|
| Labour | Brian Wallace | 1,346 | 65.9 | |
| SNP | Dorothy McIntosh | 695 | 34.1 | |
| Majority | | 651 | 31.2 | |
| Turnout | | 2,036 | 61.41 | |
| Labour hold | | Swing | | |
