= SNP =

SNP may refer to:

== Biology and medicine ==
- Single-nucleotide polymorphism, a DNA sequence variation
- Sodium nitroprusside, a peripheral vasodilator

== Computing ==
- SNP (complexity), a complexity class in theoretical computer science
- SNP file format, for Microsoft Access reports
- Scalable Networking Pack, to extend Microsoft Windows Server 2003
- Secure Network Programming, a prototype Internet protocol and API
- SnP file or Touchstone file, an electrical circuit simulation data format

== Entertainment ==
- The Sunday Night Project, a British television show
- "SNP (Shining Nature Purity)", a 2020 song by W24
- Sportsnet Pacific, broadcaster of the Vancouver Canucks
- SportsNet Pittsburgh, broadcaster of the Pittsburgh Penguins and Pittsburgh Pirates

== Historical events ==
- The Slovak National Uprising (Slovak: Slovenské národné povstanie)

== Places ==
- Six Nations Polytechnic, post-secondary institution in Ontario, Canada
- State Nature Preserves of the Kentucky State Nature Preserves Commission
- SNP Bridge, Bratislava, Slovakia
- SNP Square, Banská Bystrica, Slovakia

== Political parties ==
- Scottish National Party, a political party in Scotland
- Seychelles National Party
- Socialist People's Party of Montenegro (Serbian: Socijalistička narodna partija Crne Gore)
- Serbian People's Party (Serbian: Srpska narodna partija), Serbia
- Self-Defence of the Polish Nation (Polish: Samoobrona Narodu Polskiego), Poland

== Other uses ==
- Sinopec's NYSE ticker symbol
- Social networking potential in marketing research
- Special needs plan, a Medicare Advantage plan
- Sandown Park railway station, Melbourne

== See also ==
- S&P Global Ratings
