= 2003 Argyll and Bute Council election =

2003 Scottish local government election

- 1 May 2003

All 36 seats to Argyll and Bute Council 19 seats needed for a majority
	First party	Second party	Third party
Party	Independent	Liberal Democrats	SNP
Last election	20	6	5
Seats won	22	8	3
Seat change	▲2	▲2	▼2
Popular vote	18,843	5,243	4,829
Percentage	51.5%	14.3%	13.2%
Swing	▲8.3%	▼6.2%	▼2.6%
	Fourth party	Fifth party
Party	Conservative	Labour
Last election	4	1
Seats won	3	0
Seat change	▼1	▼1
Popular vote	6,224	1,004
Percentage	17.0%	2.7%
Swing	▲6.3%	▼7.2%
- Results by ward
Council Leader before election
Allan MacAskill
Independent
Council Leader
Allan MacAskill
Independent

The 2003 elections to Argyll and Bute Council were held on the 1 May 2003 and were the third for the unitary authority, which was created under the Local Government etc (Scotland) Act 1994 and replaced the previous two-tier system of local government under Strathclyde Regional Council and Dumbarton and Argyll & Bute District Councils. It was held on the same day as the second Scottish Parliament election and resulted in no change to the administration of the council - independent control. These were the last elections to the council using the first past the post electoral system.

== Election results ==
Argyll and Bute local election results 2003
Party	Seats	Gains	Losses	Net gain/loss	Seats %	Votes %	Votes	+/−
Independent	22	6	4	▲2	61.11	51.5	18,843	▲8.3
Liberal Democrats	8	3	1	▲2	22.22	14.3	5,243	▼6.2
SNP	3	0	2	▼2	8.33	13.2	6,224	▼2.6
Conservative	3	1	2	▼1	8.33	17.0	4,829	▲6.3
Labour	0	0	1	▼1	0.00	2.7	1,004	▼7.2
Scottish Socialist	0	0	0	0	0.00	1.2	439	New

== Ward results ==
Ward 1: South Kintyre
Party	Candidate	Votes	%
Conservative	Donald Kelly	900	83.0
Labour	Joyce Oxborrow	184	17.0
Majority		716	66.0
Turnout		1,084	58.1
Conservative hold			

Ward 2: Campbeltown Central
Party	Candidate	Votes	%
Independent	Alastair M McKinlay	414	40.0
Liberal Democrats	Morris McIntyre	320	30.9
Independent	John J Sloey	106	10.2
SNP	Anne C Baird	99	9.6
Independent	David Card	96	9.3
Majority		94	9.1
Turnout		1,035	52.4
Independent hold			

Ward 3: East Central Kintyre
Party	Candidate	Votes	%
Liberal Democrats	Rory Colville	505	44.7
Labour	George McMillan	272	24.1
Independent	Johnny Durnan	238	21.1
SNP	A John MacLellan	115	10.2
Majority		233	20.6
Turnout		1,130	57.3
Liberal Democrats gain from Independent			

Ward 4: North and West Kintyre
Party	Candidate	Votes	%
Independent	John McAlpine	338	27.8
Independent	Mary Smith	252	20.8
Liberal Democrats	Douglas Robertson	214	17.6
Independent	Dougie MacKinnon	198	16.3
SNP	Alexander MacDougall Horn	136	11.2
Independent	Arthur A McFarlane	76	6.3
Majority		86	7.0
Turnout		1,214	65.1
Independent gain from Independent			

Ward 5: Knapdale
Party	Candidate	Votes	%
Independent	Bruce Robertson	595	52.9
Independent	Sandy Cameron	437	38.8
Conservative	Hew W M D Service	93	8.3
Majority		158	14.1
Turnout		1,125	61.4
Independent hold			

Ward 6: Lochgilphead
Party	Candidate	Votes	%
Independent	Donnie MacMillan	663	52.9
Labour	Douglas T Philand	426	36.3
Liberal Democrats	Trevor J Oxborrow	84	7.2
Majority		237	16.6
Turnout		1,173	59.2
Independent hold			

Ward 7: Craignish - Glenaray
Party	Candidate	Votes	%
Liberal Democrats	Alison J Hay	645	54.8
Independent	David D Litster	449	38.1
Conservative	Miranda Mary Van Lynden	84	7.1
Majority		196	16.7
Turnout		1,178	58.3
Liberal Democrats hold			

Ward 8: Islay North, Jura and Colonsay
Party	Candidate	Votes	%
Liberal Democrats	Robin Currie	Unopposed	N/A
Liberal Democrats hold			

Ward 9: Islay South
Party	Candidate	Votes	%
Independent	John M R Findlay	Unopposed	N/A
Independent hold			

Ward 10: Awe
Party	Candidate	Votes	%
Independent	Allan N Macaskill	590	55.5
SNP	Alexander MacKinnon	339	31.9
Conservative	Ray Norris	135	12.7
Majority		251	23.6
Turnout		1,064	61.5
Independent hold			

Ward 11: Oban North
Party	Candidate	Votes	%
Independent	Sidney D MacDougall	390	37.3
Independent	David V Webster	267	25.5
Independent	Neil Morrison MacKay	256	24.5
Conservative	David D Petrie	133	12.7
Majority		123	11.8
Turnout		1,046	57.2
Independent gain from Independent			

Ward 12: Oban Central
Party	Candidate	Votes	%
Independent	Robin Banks	563	54.2
Conservative	Roy Bain Irvine Rutherford	238	22.9
SNP	Donald J MacDonald	238	22.9
Majority		325	31.3
Turnout		1,039	55.3
Independent hold			

Ward 13: Oban South
Party	Candidate	Votes	%
SNP	Donald McIntosh	551	52.1
Independent	Frederick MacKenzie	364	34.4
Independent	Allan Maurice McKie	142	13.4
Majority		187	17.7
Turnout		1,057	52.9
SNP hold			

Ward 14: Ardconnel - Kilmore
Party	Candidate	Votes	%
Independent	Duncan C MacIntyre	696	58.3
SNP	George Berry	249	20.9
Independent	Michael F W MacKenzie	248	20.8
Majority		447	37.4
Turnout		1,193	60.5
Independent hold			

Ward 15: North Lorn
Party	Candidate	Votes	%
Independent	Elaine M Robertson	853	62.1
SNP	Campbell Cameron	520	37.9
Majority		333	24.2
Turnout		1,373	63.3
Independent gain from SNP			

Ward 16: Mull
Party	Candidate	Votes	%
Independent	Alistair MacDougall	716	54.6
SNP	Gordon Chalmers	595	45.4
Majority		121	9.2
Turnout		1,311	58.8
Independent hold			

Ward 17: Tiree and Coll
Party	Candidate	Votes	%
Independent	Ian Gillies	Unopposed	N/A
Independent hold			

Ward 18: Bute North
Party	Candidate	Votes	%
SNP	Robert E Macintyre	777	74.5
Independent	Robert W Colquhoun	184	17.6
Scottish Socialist	Roberta McPherson	82	7.9
Majority		593	56.9
Turnout		1,043	61.5
SNP hold			

Ward 19: Bute Central
Party	Candidate	Votes	%
SNP	Isobel Strong	752	70.4
Independent	Fraser Gillies	316	29.6
Majority		436	40.8
Turnout		1,068	54.7
SNP hold			

Ward 20: Bute South
Party	Candidate	Votes	%
Independent	Len Scoullar	888	88.0
Scottish Socialist	Anthony Edwards	121	12.0
Majority		767	76.0
Turnout		1,236	60.2
Independent hold			

Ward 21: East Lochfyne
Party	Candidate	Votes	%
Local and Rural Issues	Douglas C Currie	468	34.4
Independent	Alexander McNaughton	453	33.3
SNP	Gordon Neish	251	18.4
Conservative	John D Geary	190	14.0
Majority		15	1.1
Turnout		1,362	65.1
Independent hold			

Ward 22: Kirn and Hunter's Quay
Party	Candidate	Votes	%
Independent	Brian J Chennell	764	71.7
SNP	Roy E Rees	301	28.3
Majority		463	43.4
Turnout		1,065	56.6
Independent gain from SNP			

Ward 23: Ardenslate
Party	Candidate	Votes	%
Independent	James McQueen	633	58.0
SNP	Alister MacAlister	199	18.2
Liberal Democrats	Philip W W Norris	146	13.4
Scottish Socialist	Desmond Divers	114	10.4
Majority		434	39.8
Turnout		1,092	56.4
Independent hold			

Ward 24: Milton
Party	Candidate	Votes	%
Independent	Gordon C McKinven	588	55.8
Liberal Democrats	Marco A Pellicci	211	20.0
SNP	David W M Hill	133	12.6
Scottish Socialist	John G Dysart	122	11.6
Majority		377	35.8
Turnout		1,054	59.6
Independent gain from Labour			

Ward 25: Auchamore and Innellan
Party	Candidate	Votes	%
Independent	Dick Walsh	740	61.1
SNP	Alan Clayton	244	20.1
Conservative	Linda M Pursley	227	18.7
Majority		496	41.0
Turnout		1,211	61.8
Independent hold			

Ward 26: Holy Loch
Party	Candidate	Votes	%
Conservative	Bruce Marshall	735	61.0
SNP	Andrew D MacNicol	469	39.0
Majority		266	22.0
Turnout		1,204	63.0
Conservative hold			

Ward 27: Helensburgh East
Party	Candidate	Votes	%
Liberal Democrats	Eric Thompson	625	63.3
Independent	Jeannette Scobie	153	15.5
Labour	Brett Weintz	145	14.7
Conservative	Sharon Spruce	65	6.6
Majority		472	47.8
Turnout		988	51.7
Liberal Democrats hold			

Ward 28: East Central Helensburgh
Party	Candidate	Votes	%
Liberal Democrats	Moyra Stewart	591	61.6
Independent	Tony Dance	238	24.8
Conservative	David McEwan	130	13.6
Majority		353	36.8
Turnout		959	54.1
Liberal Democrats hold			

Ward 29: Helensburgh Central
Party	Candidate	Votes	%
Liberal Democrats	John Tacchi	323	34.4
Conservative	Sheila Wilson	322	34.3
Independent	Gordon Hanning	294	31.3
Majority		1	0.1
Turnout		939	49.3
Liberal Democrats gain from Conservative			

Ward 30: Helensburgh North
Party	Candidate	Votes	%
Liberal Democrats	Ellen Morton	417	39.2
Conservative	Nigel Spruce	210	19.7
Independent	Wilma Hanlon	205	19.2
Labour	Caroline Weintz	161	15.1
SNP	Elizabeth Buist	72	6.8
Majority		207	19.5
Turnout		1,065	47.0
Liberal Democrats hold			

Ward 31: Helensburgh West
Party	Candidate	Votes	%
Liberal Democrats	Al Reay	529	42.0
Conservative	John Stirling	426	33.8
Independent	David Sinclair	306	24.3
Majority		103	8.2
Turnout		1,261	54.5
Liberal Democrats gain from Conservative			

Ward 32: West Helensburgh and Rhu
Party	Candidate	Votes	%
Conservative	Gary Mulvaney	386	35.8
Independent	Stanley Latimer	368	34.1
Liberal Democrats	Nigel Millar	324	30.1
Majority		18	1.7
Turnout		1,078	57.1
Conservative gain from Independent			

Ward 33: Garelochhead and Cove
Party	Candidate	Votes	%
Independent	George Freeman	705	80.8
Liberal Democrats	Eric Routley	84	9.6
Conservative	Jacqueline Findlay	84	9.6
Majority		621	71.2
Turnout		873	54.1
Independent hold			

Ward 34: Arrochar, Luss, Arden and Ardenconnell
Party	Candidate	Votes	%
Independent	Billy Petrie	634	64.4
SNP	Thomas G McCormick	184	18.7
Conservative	Peter Ramsay	167	17.0
Majority		450	45.7
Turnout		985	52.8
Independent hold			

Ward 35: Rosneath, Clynder and Kilcreggan
Party	Candidate	Votes	%
Independent	Daniel Kelly	543	43.5
Independent	Robert G MacIntyre	379	30.4
Liberal Democrats	Alison Cameron	179	14.3
Independent	William Reaney	96	7.7
Conservative	Cyril T Skrastin	51	4.1
Majority		164	13.1
Turnout		1,248	63.5
Independent gain from Liberal Democrats			

Ward 36: Cardross
Party	Candidate	Votes	%
Independent	Ronald Kinloch	803	76.0
Conservative	Ian Smith	253	24.0
Majority		550	52.0
Turnout		1,056	59.5
Independent hold			
