= 1999 Aberdeenshire Council election =

1999 Scottish local government election

- 6 May 1999

All 68 seats to Aberdeenshire Council 35 seats needed for a majority
	First party	Second party
Party	Liberal Democrats	SNP
Last election	15 seats, 24.0%	15 seats, 33.1%
Seats won	28	23
Seat change	▲13	▲8
Popular vote	29,908	26,848
Percentage	32.8%	29.4%
Swing	▲8.8%	▼3.7%
	Third party	Fourth party
Party	Independent	Conservative
Last election	13 seats, 25.8%	4 seats, 10.8%
Seats won	10	7
Seat change	▼3	▲3
Popular vote	13,036	16,795
Percentage	14.3%	18.4%
Swing	▼11.5%	▲7.6%
- Results by ward

Elections to Aberdeenshire Council were held on 6 May 1999; the same day as elections to the Scottish Parliament and to the 31 other Scottish local authorities. 68 councillors were elected from 68 wards using First Past The Post (FPTP). This election was conducted under boundary changes with an increased number of seats from the 47 used in the 1995 election. The Liberal Democrats were the largest party, with councillors also being elected representing the SNP, Independents, and Conservatives.

== Background ==
=== Previous election ===
At the previous election in 1995, the Scottish National Party (SNP) and the Liberal Democrats had the joint most number of seats at 15 each, both falling 9 short of an overall majority. It must be said though that in 1995 there were only 47 wards.

1995 Aberdeenshire Council election result
Party	Seats	Vote share
SNP	15	33.1%
Liberal Democrats	15	24.0%
Independent	13	25.8%
Conservative	4	10.8%

== Results ==
1999 Aberdeenshire Council election result
Party	Seats	Gains	Losses	Net gain/loss	Seats %	Votes %	Votes	+/−
Liberal Democrats	28	-	-	▲13	47.2	32.8	29,908	▲8.8
SNP	23	-	-	▲8	33.8	29.4	26,848	▼3.7
Independent	10	-	-	▼3	14.7	14.3	13,036	▼11.5
Conservative	7	-	-	▲3	10.3	18.4	16,795	▲7.6
Labour	0	-	-	Steady	0.0	5.0	4,579	▼1.3
Green	0	-	-	Steady	0.0	0.1	80	Steady

== Ward results ==
Ward 1 Durn
Party	Candidate	Votes	%
SNP	S Taylor	817	57.0
Liberal Democrats	J Mair	617	43.0
Majority		202	14.0
Turnout		1436	62.0
SNP win (new seat)			

Ward 2 Banff West & Boyndie
Party	Candidate	Votes	%
SNP	J McKee	618	45.8
Independent	R Cumming	296	22.0
Independent	T Chalmers	227	16.8
Liberal Democrats	H Mair	207	15.4
Majority		322	23.8
Turnout		1348	59.1
SNP win (new seat)			

Ward 3 Banff
Party	Candidate	Votes	%
SNP	J Cox	987	72.8
Liberal Democrats	S Barett	187	13.8
Conservative	C Sutherland	181	13.4
Majority		800	59.0
Turnout		1,355	57.9
SNP win (new seat)			

Ward 4 Aberchirder
Party	Candidate	Votes	%
SNP	K Benzie	491	41.3
Independent	C Bruce	423	35.6
Liberal Democrats	D Ward	274	23.1
Majority		68	5.7
Turnout		1,188	51.5
SNP win (new seat)			

Ward 5 Macduff
Party	Candidate	Votes	%
SNP	S Mair	948	80.3
Liberal Democrats	S Ritchie	233	19.7
Majority		715	60.6
Turnout		1,181	50.7
SNP win (new seat)			

Ward 6 Gamrie-King Edward
Party	Candidate	Votes	%
SNP	A Buchan	537	45.2
Independent	J Duncan	530	44.7
Liberal Democrats	E Murphy	120	10.1
Majority		7	0.5
Turnout		1,187	58.3
SNP win (new seat)			

Ward 7 Buchan North
Party	Candidate	Votes	%
SNP	M Burnett	784	57.6
Independent	M Rennie	409	30.1
Liberal Democrats	J Murphy	167	12.3
Majority		375	27.5
Turnout		1,360	58.3
SNP win (new seat)			

Ward 8 Fraserburgh West
Party	Candidate	Votes	%
SNP	B Topping	unopposed	
SNP win (new seat)			

Ward 9 Fraserburgh North
Party	Candidate	Votes	%
SNP	D Duguid	887	70.6
Independent	J Milne	370	29.4
Majority		517	41.2
Turnout		1,257	52.3
SNP win (new seat)			

Ward 10 Fraserburgh East
Party	Candidate	Votes	%
SNP	I Tait	931	72.3
Liberal Democrats	P MacKie	357	27.7
Majority		574	44.6
Turnout		1,288	52.6
SNP win (new seat)			

Ward 11 Fraserburgh South
Party	Candidate	Votes	%
Independent	H Fowler	757	56.5
SNP	A Ramsay	584	43.5
Majority		173	13.0
Turnout		1,341	54.6
Independent win (new seat)			

Ward 12 Buchan North East
Party	Candidate	Votes	%
SNP	M McRae	unopposed	
SNP win (new seat)			

Ward 13 South Buchan
Party	Candidate	Votes	%
SNP	N Thomson	417	31.2
Independent	R Chapman	338	25.3
Liberal Democrats	D Smith	308	23.1
Independent	J Conn	165	12.4
Labour	C Donald	108	8.1
Majority		79	5.9
Turnout		1,336	55
SNP win (new seat)			

Ward 14 Central Buchan
Party	Candidate	Votes	%
SNP	S Tennant	776	51.9
Conservative	R Thomas	447	29.9
Liberal Democrats	V Duncan	272	18.2
Majority		329	22.0
Turnout		1,495	57.9
SNP win (new seat)			

Ward 15 Lonmay & St. Fergus
Party	Candidate	Votes	%
Independent	N Cowie	1,015	61.6
SNP	P MacKie	519	31.5
Liberal Democrats	J Michie	115	7.0
Majority		496	30.1
Turnout		1,649	68.0
Independent win (new seat)			

Ward 16 Mintlaw-Old Deer
Party	Candidate	Votes	%
SNP	D McHugh	521	38.7
Independent	A Howie	329	24.4
Liberal Democrats	W Cruickshank	314	23.3
Conservative	G Walker	182	13.5
Majority		192	14.3
Turnout		1,346	59.6
SNP win (new seat)			

Ward 17 Mintlaw-Longside
Party	Candidate	Votes	%
SNP	A MacLeod	513	36.7
Conservative	I Sutherland	449	32.1
Liberal Democrats	J Murison	436	31.2
Majority		64	4.6
Turnout		1,398	59.6
SNP win (new seat)			

Ward 18 Boddam-Inverugie
Party	Candidate	Votes	%
Liberal Democrats	S Couli	829	61.7
SNP	R Broughall	515	38.3
Majority		314	23.4
Turnout		1,344	50.6
Liberal Democrats win (new seat)			

Ward 19 Blackhouse
Party	Candidate	Votes	%
SNP	A Fowler	853	66.1
Conservative	W Kenny	438	33.9
Majority		415	32.2
Turnout		1,291	48.2
SNP win (new seat)			

Ward 20 Buchanhaven
Party	Candidate	Votes	%
SNP	A Strachan	unopposed	
SNP win (new seat)			

Ward 21 Peterhead Central-Roanheads
Party	Candidate	Votes	%
SNP	G Barnes	unopposed	
SNP win (new seat)			

Ward 22 Clerkhill
Party	Candidate	Votes	%
SNP	J Davidson	unopposed	
SNP win (new seat)			

Ward 23 Dales-Towerhill
Party	Candidate	Votes	%
SNP	S Pratt	938	75.7
Liberal Democrats	P Morris	301	24.3
Majority		637	51.4
Turnout		1,239	51.3
SNP win (new seat)			

Ward 24 Cruden
Party	Candidate	Votes	%
SNP	J Towers	851	60.1
Conservative	M Cantlay	381	26.9
Liberal Democrats	D Mackie	185	13.1
Majority		470	33.2
Turnout		1,417	61.5
SNP win (new seat)			

Ward 25 Turriff West
Party	Candidate	Votes	%
Independent	S B Mair	645	54.1
SNP	A Dillon	250	21.0
Liberal Democrats	M Daley	157	13.2
Conservative	R Grogan	79	6.6
Labour	C Morrison	62	5.2
Majority		395	33.1
Turnout		1,193	47.9
Independent win (new seat)			

Ward 26 Turriff East
Party	Candidate	Votes	%
Independent	A Norrie	395	39.2
Liberal Democrats	A Carmichael	305	30.3
SNP	M Shaw	225	22.3
Conservative	D Churcher	83	8.2
Majority		90	8.9
Turnout		1,008	49.1
Independent win (new seat)			

Ward 27 Upper Ythan
Party	Candidate	Votes	%
Independent	H Cormack	416	34.6
Liberal Democrats	J Picken	279	23.2
SNP	A Will	246	20.4
Conservative	A Jiggens	178	14.8
Labour	A McLean-Bullen	84	7.0
Majority		137	11.4
Turnout		1,203	53.9
Independent win (new seat)			

Ward 28 Fyvle-Methlick
Party	Candidate	Votes	%
Liberal Democrats	E A Robertson	788	57.9
Conservative	R Fenton	302	22.2
SNP	F Hall	178	13.1
Labour	W McConnach	94	6.9
Majority		486	35.7
Turnout		1,362	58.7
Liberal Democrats win (new seat)			

Ward 29 Tarves
Party	Candidate	Votes	%
Liberal Democrats	P Johnston	760	44.8
Conservative	R McIntyre	459	27.0
SNP	F Nicholson	340	20.0
Labour	S Thomson	139	8.2
Majority		301	17.8
Turnout		1,698	60.3
Liberal Democrats win (new seat)			

Ward 30 Ythan
Party	Candidate	Votes	%
Liberal Democrats	A McInnes	796	48.0
SNP	R Duncan	512	30.9
Conservative	C Wolrige-Gordon	232	14.0
Labour	S Osprey	118	7.1
Majority		284	17.1
Turnout		1,658	58.2
Liberal Democrats win (new seat)			

Ward 31 Ellon Town
Party	Candidate	Votes	%
SNP	A Cameron	478	35.1
Liberal Democrats	J Bowie	442	32.5
Conservative	M Kinnaird	276	20.3
Labour	L Stevenson	165	12.1
Majority		36	2.6
Turnout		1,361	56.7
SNP win (new seat)			

Ward 32 Logie Buchan
Party	Candidate	Votes	%
Liberal Democrats	J Anderson	834	51.2
SNP	R Kemp	616	37.8
Labour	J Osprey	178	10.9
Majority		218	13.4
Turnout		1,628	56.5
Liberal Democrats win (new seat)			

Ward 33 Meldrum
Party	Candidate	Votes	%
Liberal Democrats	J Loveday	651	42.1
Conservative	P Sleigh	486	31.4
SNP	G Ingram	300	19.4
Labour	W Tuckwood	111	7.2
Majority		165	10.7
Turnout		1,548	60.3
Liberal Democrats win (new seat)			

Ward 34 Udny Slains
Party	Candidate	Votes	%
Liberal Democrats	J Sheridan	765	49.2
SNP	J Daly	313	20.1
Conservative	J Gifford	286	18.4
Labour	R Kelly	190	12.2
Majority		452	29.1
Turnout		1,554	57.3
Liberal Democrats win (new seat)			

Ward 35 Belhelvie
Party	Candidate	Votes	%
Liberal Democrats	D Storr	635	43.6
SNP	J MacAskill	357	24.5
Conservative	D Costin	262	18.0
Labour	M Carr	202	13.9
Majority		278	19.1
Turnout		1,456	55.0
Liberal Democrats win (new seat)			

Ward 36 Insch
Party	Candidate	Votes	%
Liberal Democrats	S Lonchay	756	50.4
Conservative	T Reed	265	17.7
SNP	B Fielding-Browne	232	15.5
Independent	L Tock	125	8.3
Labour	R Winchester	121	8.1
Majority		491	32.7
Turnout		1,499	54.3
Liberal Democrats win (new seat)			

Ward 37 Chapel & Gadle
Party	Candidate	Votes	%
Liberal Democrats	C Millar	578	39.9
Independent	A Marr	346	23.9
SNP	D Gorman	189	13.1
Labour	J Cameron	179	12.4
Conservative	M Hencken	155	10.7
Majority		232	16.0
Turnout		1,447	62.3
Liberal Democrats win (new seat)			

Ward 38 Inverurie North
Party	Candidate	Votes	%
Liberal Democrats	M Raeburn	536	41.5
SNP	A McDiarmid	270	20.9
Labour	E Thorpe	243	18.8
Conservative	R Cowling	243	18.8
Majority		266	20.6
Turnout		1,292	54.3
Liberal Democrats win (new seat)			

Ward 39 Inverurie Central
Party	Candidate	Votes	%
Liberal Democrats	H Bisset	933	62.2
SNP	R Reid	213	14.2
Labour	A Thorpe	200	13.3
Conservative	L Johnstone	155	10.3
Majority		720	58.0
Turnout		1,501	58.1
Liberal Democrats win (new seat)			

Ward 40 Inverurie South & Port Elphins
Party	Candidate	Votes	%
Liberal Democrats	R Bisset	912	59.4
SNP	A Blackett	276	18.0
Conservative	D Stewart	174	11.3
Labour	B Begg	173	11.3
Majority		636	41.4
Turnout		1,535	56.3
Liberal Democrats win (new seat)			

Ward 41 Kintore & Keithhall
Party	Candidate	Votes	%
Conservative	D Cameron	606	37.1
Liberal Democrats	C Copeland	565	34.6
SNP	A Wilson	309	18.9
Labour	R Knowles	154	9.4
Majority		41	2.5
Turnout		1,634	61.8
Conservative win (new seat)			

Ward 42 Newmachar & Fintray
Party	Candidate	Votes	%
Liberal Democrats	M Ford	573	39.2
SNP	A Allan	326	22.3
Independent	F Hood	276	18.9
Conservative	A Bell	174	11.9
Labour	C Schenk	112	7.7
Majority		247	16.9
Turnout		1,461	58.8
Liberal Democrats win (new seat)			

Ward 43 Kemnay
Party	Candidate	Votes	%
Liberal Democrats	A Leitch	708	54.5
SNP	G Paterson	398	30.6
Conservative	I Wakley	194	14.9
Majority		310	23.9
Turnout		1,300	51.6
Liberal Democrats win (new seat)			

Ward 44 Echt
Party	Candidate	Votes	%
Liberal Democrats	G Saluja	703	45.4
Conservative	W Leslie	329	21.5
SNP	L Davidson	379	24.5
Majority		374	23.9
Turnout		1,547	56.0
Liberal Democrats win (new seat)			

Ward 45 Kinellar & Westhill North
Party	Candidate	Votes	%
Liberal Democrats	J McGregor	767	50.0
Conservative	W Leslie	329	21.5
SNP	M Cullen	292	19.0
Labour	S Bousfield	145	9.5
Majority		438	28.5
Turnout		1,533	60.0
Liberal Democrats win (new seat)			

Ward 46 Westhill Central
Party	Candidate	Votes	%
Liberal Democrats	A Findlay	1,120	54.4
Conservative	I Walker	602	29.2
SNP	J Hermse	189	9.2
Labour	L Leighton	148	7.2
Majority		518	25.2
Turnout		2,059	64.4
Liberal Democrats win (new seat)			

Ward 47 Elrick
Party	Candidate	Votes	%
Liberal Democrats	W A Findlay	739	56.7
SNP	C Little	319	24.5
Conservative	I Hopkin	246	18.9
Majority		420	32.2
Turnout		2,059	64.4
Liberal Democrats win (new seat)			

Ward 48 Huntly West
Party	Candidate	Votes	%
SNP	J Strathdee	391	33.3
Liberal Democrats	P Morgan	313	26.7
Independent	R Ness	219	18.7
Conservative	N Webb	146	12.4
Labour	P Sheal	104	8.9
Majority		78	6.6
Turnout		1,173	49.5
SNP win (new seat)			

Ward 49 Huntly East
Party	Candidate	Votes	%
Liberal Democrats	W Anderson	605	38.9
Independent	G Lumsden	506	32.6
SNP	J Strong	222	14.3
Conservative	B Jiggens	132	8.5
Labour	R Barton	89	5.7
Majority		99	6.3
Turnout		1,554	54.9
Liberal Democrats win (new seat)			

Ward 50 Strathbogie
Party	Candidate	Votes	%
Liberal Democrats	K Carmichael	369	27.1
Independent	D Grant	345	25.3
Conservative	M Taitt	328	24.0
SNP	M Grant	242	17.7
Green Independent	J Williams	80	5.9
Majority		24	1.8
Turnout		1,364	54.6
Liberal Democrats win (new seat)			

Ward 51 Donside & Cromar
Party	Candidate	Votes	%
Conservative	B Luffman	610	39.0
Liberal Democrats	R Hunter	475	30.3
SNP	C Watt	361	23.1
Labour	N Bayfield	120	7.7
Majority		135	8.7
Turnout		1,566	58.7
Conservative win (new seat)			

Ward 52 Alford
Party	Candidate	Votes	%
Liberal Democrats	R Stroud	847	57.0
Conservative	F Lawson	348	23.4
SNP	L Watt	292	19.6
Majority		499	33.6
Turnout		1,487	55.7
Liberal Democrats win (new seat)			

Ward 53 Upper Deeside
Party	Candidate	Votes	%
Conservative	J M M Humphrey	1,048	64.7
Liberal Democrats	J MacKintosh	266	16.4
SNP	A Low	234	14.4
Independent	D Bruce	73	4.5
Majority		782	48.3
Turnout		1,621	62.8
Conservative win (new seat)			

Ward 54 Aboyne
Party	Candidate	Votes	%
Liberal Democrats	P Argyle	752	43.7
Conservative	G Fiddes	619	36.0
SNP	J Meiklejohn	212	12.3
Labour	G Gray	137	8.0
Majority		133	7.7
Turnout		1,720	65.8
Liberal Democrats win (new seat)			

Ward 55 Mid Deeside
Party	Candidate	Votes	%
Conservative	D Ewing	837	43.3
Liberal Democrats	S Hall	578	29.9
SNP	G Clark	331	17.1
Labour	G Urquhart	186	9.6
Majority		259	13.4
Turnout		1,932	63.6
Conservative win (new seat)			

Ward 56 Banchory West
Party	Candidate	Votes	%
Independent	N Makin	1,210	73.9
Liberal Democrats	I McMillan	290	17.7
Labour	J Burt	137	8.4
Majority		920	56.2
Turnout		1,637	60.7
Independent win (new seat)			

Ward 57 Banchory East & Crathes
Party	Candidate	Votes	%
Independent	J Watson	408	27.4
Independent	R Parr	297	19.9
Conservative	S Salter	270	18.1
Liberal Democrats	B Strachan	245	16.4
SNP	H Taylor	158	10.6
Labour	G Bayfield	113	7.6
Majority		111	7.5
Turnout		1,491	62.0
Liberal Democrats win (new seat)			

Ward 58 Lower Deeside
Party	Candidate	Votes	%
Conservative	A Wallace	521	32.6
Independent	H Irvine-Fortescue	368	23.0
SNP	C Douglas	291	18.2
Liberal Democrats	J Piggins	287	18.0
Labour	M Hagger	131	8.2
Majority		153	9.6
Turnout		1,598	57.8
Conservative win (new seat)			

Ward 59 Portlethen North
Party	Candidate	Votes	%
Liberal Democrats	A Tunstall	486	33.0
SNP	G Coutts	462	31.4
Conservative	E Leavitt	266	18.1
Labour	D Watt	258	17.5
Majority		24	1.6
Turnout		1,472	54.0
Liberal Democrats win (new seat)			

Ward 60 Portlethen South
Party	Candidate	Votes	%
Liberal Democrats	M Nash	623	45.3
SNP	A Bews	380	27.6
Conservative	G Paterson	372	27.1
Majority		243	17.7
Turnout		1,275	53.0
Liberal Democrats win (new seat)			

Ward 61 Newtonhill, Muchalls & Cammachmore
Party	Candidate	Votes	%
Conservative	C Nelson	668	41.8
Liberal Democrats	S Emery	619	38.8
SNP	B McCabe	239	16.1
Majority		49	3.1
Turnout		1,597	64.0
Conservative win (new seat)			

Ward 62 Stonehaven North & Fetteresso
Party	Candidate	Votes	%
Conservative	A Bisset	658	44.3
Liberal Democrats	M Sullivan	436	29.3
SNP	T Muir	239	16.1
Labour	J Smith	153	10.3
Majority		222	15.0
Turnout		1,486	60.8
Conservative win (new seat)			

Ward 63 Stonehaven Central
Party	Candidate	Votes	%
Liberal Democrats	J Morrison	544	33.2
Conservative	L Forbes	504	30.7
SNP	G MacDonald	327	19.9
Independent	D Berrisford	266	16.2
Majority		40	2.4
Turnout		1,641	61.4
Liberal Democrats win (new seat)			

Ward 64 Stonehaven South
Party	Candidate	Votes	%
Independent	J H McLean	537	37.0
Conservative	W Agnew	306	21.1
SNP	J Vigurs	265	18.2
Liberal Democrats	P Bellarby	219	15.1
Labour	D Sharp	126	8.7
Majority		231	15.9
Turnout		1,453	52.5
Independent win (new seat)			

Ward 65 Mearns North
Party	Candidate	Votes	%
Independent	G Swapp	1,097	67.8
Conservative	B Bartlett	178	11.0
SNP	S Munn	173	10.7
Liberal Democrats	C Tailford	169	10.5
Majority		919	56.8
Turnout		1,617	61.5
Independent win (new seat)			

Ward 66 Mearns Central
Party	Candidate	Votes	%
Independent	I Frain	442	35.5
SNP	S Speirs	323	26.0
Independent	V Fairclough	206	16.6
Liberal Democrats	B Fenwick	174	14.0
Labour	J Milne	99	8.0
Majority		119	9.5
Turnout		1,244	52.9
Independent win (new seat)			

Ward 67 Inverbervie, Gourdon, & Johnshaven
Party	Candidate	Votes	%
Liberal Democrats	D Smith	649	43.9
SNP	P Martin	578	39.1
Conservative	J Duncan	252	17.0
Majority		71	4.8
Turnout		1,479	53.8
Liberal Democrats win (new seat)			

Ward 68 Mearns South
Party	Candidate	Votes	%
Liberal Democrats	W Howatson	738	49.1
Conservative	W Pirie	403	26.8
SNP	J Dick	361	24.0
Majority		335	22.3
Turnout		1,502	55.7
Liberal Democrats win (new seat)			
