= 1995 Argyll and Bute Council election =

1995 Scottish local government election

- 6 April 1995

All 33 seats to Argyll and Bute Council 17 seats needed for a majority
	First party	Second party	Third party
Party	Independent	SNP	Liberal Democrats
Last election	16	2	3
Seats won	21	4	3
Seat change	▲5	▲2	Steady
Popular vote	15,171	3,787	4,240
Percentage	50.2%	12.6%	14.1%
	Fourth party	Fifth party
Party	Conservative	Labour
Last election	4	1
Seats won	3	2
Seat change	▼1	▲1
Popular vote	3,923	3,036
Percentage	13.0%	10.1%
- Results by ward
Council Leader before election
Position created
Council Leader
Dick Walsh
Independent

The 1995 elections to Argyll and Bute Council were held on 6 April 1995 and were the first for the newly formed unitary authority, which was created under the Local Government etc (Scotland) Act 1994 and replaced the previous two-tier system of local government under Strathclyde Regional Council and Dumbarton and Argyll & Bute District Councils.

== Election results ==
Results of the election

Argyll and Bute local election results 1995
Party	Seats	Gains	Losses	Net gain/loss	Seats %	Votes %	Votes	+/−
Independent	21			▲5	63.6	50.2	15,171	
SNP	4			▲2	12.1	12.6	3,787	
Liberal Democrats	3			Steady	9.1	14.1	4,240	
Conservative	3			▲1	9.1	13.0	3,923	
Labour	2			▲1	6.1	10.1	3,036	

== Ward results ==
Ward 1: Kinloch
Party	Candidate	Votes	%
Labour	G MacMillan	379	50.1
Liberal Democrats	M McIntyre	345	45.7
Independent	A McPherson	32	4.2
Majority		34	4.4
Turnout		756	47.7
Labour win (new seat)			

Ward 2: Kilkerran
Party	Candidate	Votes	%
Independent	A McKinlay	612	72.7
Liberal Democrats	J McKerral	176	20.9
Independent	K Kelly	54	6.4
Majority		436	51.8
Turnout		842	50.0
Independent win (new seat)			

Ward 3: North Kintyre
Party	Candidate	Votes	%
Independent	D McKinnon	604	58.4
Independent	D Henderson	431	41.6
Majority		173	16.8
Turnout		1,035	60.3
Independent win (new seat)			

Ward 4: Mid Kintyre
Party	Candidate	Votes	%
Conservative	R Currie	308	39.7
SNP	F Hood	274	35.4
Independent	G Page	139	17.9
Independent	D Black	54	7.0
Majority		34	4.4
Turnout		775	45.6
Conservative win (new seat)			

Ward 5: South Kintyre
Party	Candidate	Votes	%
Conservative	A McCallum	223	26.3
Independent	J MacLean	222	26.2
Independent	W Bell	174	20.5
SNP	J MacLellan	130	15.3
Independent	D Gardiner	99	11.7
Majority		1	0.1
Turnout		848	47.2
Conservative win (new seat)			

Ward 6: Knapdale
Party	Candidate	Votes	%
Independent	B Robertson	471	48.9
Independent	B Christie	269	27.9
Labour	J Bishop	223	23.2
Majority		202	21.0
Turnout		963	50.4
Independent win (new seat)			

Ward 7: Lochgilphead
Party	Candidate	Votes	%
Independent	D MacMillan	670	70.2
Labour	G Bishop	284	29.8
Majority		386	40.4
Turnout		954	48.1
Independent win (new seat)			

Ward 8: Craignish - Glenaray
Party	Candidate	Votes	%
Liberal Democrats	A Hay	530	51.5
Independent	N MacLean	499	48.5
Majority		31	3.0
Turnout		1,029	53.0
Liberal Democrats win (new seat)			

Ward 9: Awe
Party	Candidate	Votes	%
Independent	A Macaskill	813	73.6
Liberal Democrats	A Baker	292	26.4
Majority		521	47.2
Turnout		1,105	48.3
Independent win (new seat)			

Ward 10: Islay Kilchoman - Kildalton
Party	Candidate	Votes	%
Independent	D McKerral	490	58.0
Liberal Democrats	C MacIntyre	185	21.9
SNP	J Hunter	170	20.1
Majority		305	36.1
Turnout		845	55.3
Independent win (new seat)			

Ward 11: Islay Kilarrow, Jura and Colonsay
Party	Candidate	Votes	%
Liberal Democrats	R Currie	440	56.3
Independent	J Cameron	342	43.7
Majority		98	12.6
Turnout		782	54.3
Liberal Democrats win (new seat)			

Ward 12: Dunollie
Party	Candidate	Votes	%
Independent	D Webster	421	39.9
SNP	K MacColl	342	32.5
Liberal Democrats	D MacKenzie	291	27.6
Majority		79	7.4
Turnout		1,054	41.4
Independent win (new seat)			

Ward 13: Soroba
Party	Candidate	Votes	%
Independent	R Banks	Unopposed	N/A
Independent win (new seat)			

Ward 14: Ardconnel - Kilmore
Party	Candidate	Votes	%
Liberal Democrats	A McKie	438	39.5
SNP	P Keegan	385	34.7
Conservative	N Faccenda	287	25.8
Majority		53	4.8
Turnout		1,110	47.6
Liberal Democrats win (new seat)			

Ward 15: North Lorn
Party	Candidate	Votes	%
SNP	C Cameron	617	57.0
Liberal Democrats	D Barnes	466	43.0
Majority		151	14.0
Turnout		1,083	50.6
SNP win (new seat)			

Ward 16: Mull
Party	Candidate	Votes	%
Independent	J Wilson	782	74.0
SNP	N Harvey	275	26.0
Majority		507	48.0
Turnout		1,057	47.9
Independent win (new seat)			

Ward 17: Tiree and Coll
Party	Candidate	Votes	%
Independent	I Gillies	Unopposed	N/A
Independent win (new seat)			

Ward 18: West Rothesay
Party	Candidate	Votes	%
Independent	G Mason	513	74.3
Labour	J Gorman	177	25.7
Majority		336	48.6
Turnout		690	44.7
Independent win (new seat)			

Ward 19: Central Rothesay
Party	Candidate	Votes	%
Independent	F Gillies	473	56.6
Labour	D Flowers	362	43.4
Majority		111	13.2
Turnout		835	55.2
Independent win (new seat)			

Ward 20: East Rothesay
Party	Candidate	Votes	%
Independent	R McNamara	432	45.7
Independent	J McMillan	328	34.7
Labour	H Hattan	186	19.6
Majority		104	11.0
Turnout		946	53.2
Independent win (new seat)			

Ward 21: Kyles and Bute
Party	Candidate	Votes	%
Independent	R Macintyre	Unopposed	N/A
Independent win (new seat)			

Ward 22: East Lochfyne
Party	Candidate	Votes	%
SNP	A MacQueen	385	32.4
Independent	D Campbell	381	32.0
Independent	D McHugh	282	23.7
Liberal Democrats	D Worster	142	11.9
Majority		4	0.4
Turnout		1,190	56.2
SNP win (new seat)			

Ward 23: Kirn and Hunter's Quay
Party	Candidate	Votes	%
SNP	E MacTaggart	441	37.5
Conservative	E Waddell	402	34.2
Labour	A Kelly	217	18.4
Independent	W Taylor	117	9.9
Majority		39	3.3
Turnout		1,177	55.4
SNP win (new seat)			

Ward 24: Ardenslate
Party	Candidate	Votes	%
Independent	J Allison	243	24.2
SNP	A Sultan	208	20.7
Labour	J Saidler	182	18.2
Independent	R McChlery	180	18.0
Independent	A MacAlister	99	9.9
Liberal Democrats	B Shearer	55	5.5
Independent	J McGoran	35	3.5
Majority		35	3.5
Turnout		1,002	55.2
Independent win (new seat)			

Ward 25: Milton
Party	Candidate	Votes	%
Independent	J English	266	27.6
Labour	D Graham	248	25.7
SNP	E Drummond	237	24.6
Independent	F MacClure	213	22.1
Majority		18	1.9
Turnout		964	55.9
Independent win (new seat)			

Ward 26: Auchamore and Innellan
Party	Candidate	Votes	%
Independent	D Walsh	Unopposed	N/A
Independent win (new seat)			

Ward 27: Holy Loch
Party	Candidate	Votes	%
SNP	A MacNicol	323	27.6
Conservative	T Marshall	260	22.3
Independent	G McKinven	236	20.2
Independent	P Menzies	190	16.3
Labour	J Valentine	159	13.6
Majority		63	5.3
Turnout		1,168	60.2
SNP win (new seat)			

Ward 28: Helensburgh East
Party	Candidate	Votes	%
Labour	I MacDonald	619	40.2
Conservative	N Lawrence	507	33.0
Independent	W Sutherland	412	26.8
Majority		112	7.2
Turnout		1,538	47.0
Labour win (new seat)			

Ward 29: Helensburgh Central
Party	Candidate	Votes	%
Conservative	N Dunn	789	55.2
Liberal Democrats	M Stewart	641	44.8
Majority		148	10.4
Turnout		1,430	44.6
Conservative win (new seat)			

Ward 30: Helensburgh West
Party	Candidate	Votes	%
Independent	S Latimer	1,103	65.7
Conservative	W Morrison	575	34.3
Majority		528	31.4
Turnout		1,678	52.6
Independent win (new seat)			

Ward 31: Rhu, Garelochhead, Luss
Party	Candidate	Votes	%
Independent	W Petrie	Unopposed	N/A
Independent win (new seat)			

Ward 32: Arrochar, Kilcreggan
Party	Candidate	Votes	%
Independent	D Kelly	1,297	82.1
Conservative	A MacConochnie	283	17.9
Majority		1,014	64.2
Turnout		1,580	49.1
Independent win (new seat)			

Ward 33: Cardross, Craigendoran
Party	Candidate	Votes	%
Independent	R Kinloch	1,193	69.3
Conservative	J Stirling	289	16.8
Liberal Democrats	S Barnett	239	13.9
Majority		904	52.5
Turnout		1,721	52.7
Independent win (new seat)			
