= List of elections in 1999 =

The following elections occurred in the year 1999.

- 1999 electoral calendar

== Africa ==
- 1999 Algerian presidential election
- 1999 Botswana general election
- 1999 Botswana local elections
- 1999 Beninese parliamentary election
- 1999 Central African Republic presidential election
- 1999 Djiboutian presidential election
- 1999 Equatorial Guinean legislative election
- 1999–2000 Guinea-Bissau general election
- 1999 Malawian general election
- 1999 Mozambican general election
- 1999 Namibian general election
- 1999 Nigerian parliamentary election
- 1999 Nigerian presidential election
- 1999 Nigerien parliamentary election
- 1999 Nigerien constitutional referendum
- 1999 Nigerien presidential election
- 1999 South African general election
- 1999 South African presidential election
- 1999 Tajik constitutional referendum
- 1999 Togolese parliamentary election
- 1999 Tunisian general election

== Asia ==
- 1999 Abkhazian constitutional referendum
- 1999 Abkhazian presidential election
- 1999 Georgian parliamentary election
- 1999 Indonesian legislative election
- 1999 Indonesian presidential election
- 1999 Iranian local elections
- 1999 Israeli legislative election
- 1999 Israeli prime ministerial election
- 1999 Kuwaiti general election
- 1999 Malaysian general election
- 1999 Maldivian parliamentary election
- 1999 Nepalese legislative election
- 1999 North Korean local elections
- ~~1999 Singaporean presidential election~~
- 1999 Russian legislative election
- 1999 Sri Lankan presidential election
- 1999 Sri Lankan provincial council elections
- 1999 Syrian presidential election
- 1999 Tajik presidential election
- 1999 Tajik constitutional referendum
- 1999 Turkish local elections
- 1999 Turkmen parliamentary election
- 1999 Uzbek parliamentary election
- 1999 Wakayama gubernatorial election
- 1999 Yemeni presidential election

=== India ===
- 1999 Indian general election
  - 1999 Indian general election in Andhra Pradesh
  - 1999 Indian general election in Haryana
  - 1999 Indian general election in Delhi
  - 1999 Indian general election in Tamil Nadu
- 1999 Maharashtra Legislative Assembly election

=== Kazakhstan ===
- 1999 Kazakhstani legislative election
- 1999 Kazakh presidential election

=== Turkey ===
- 1999 Turkish general election
- 1999 Turkish local elections

== Europe ==
- 1999 Ålandic legislative election
- 1999 Andorran local elections
- 1999 Belgian federal election
- 1999 Belgian regional elections
- 1999 Dutch municipal elections
- 1999 Estonian parliamentary election
- 1999 European Parliament election
- 1999 Finnish parliamentary election
- 1999 Georgian parliamentary election
- 1999 Icelandic parliamentary election
- 1999 Irish local elections
- 1999 Italian local elections
- 1999 Jersey by-elections
- 1999 Jersey general election
- 1999 Kazakh legislative election
- 1999 Kazakh presidential election
- 1999 Latvian presidential election
- 1999 Liechtenstein local elections
- 1999 Luxembourg general election
- 1999 Macedonian presidential election
- 1999 Moldovan constitutional referendum
- 1999 Moldovan local elections
- 1999 Norwegian local elections
- 1999 Portuguese legislative election
- 1999 San Marino local elections
- 1999 Slovak presidential election
- 1999 Swiss federal election
- 1999 Swiss referendums
- 1999 Turkish local elections
- 1999 Ukrainian presidential election
- 1999 Moldovan local elections
- 1999 Russian legislative election

=== Austria ===
- 1999 Austrian legislative election
- 1999 European Parliament election in Austria

=== European Parliament ===
- 1999 European Parliament election in Austria
- 1999 European Parliament election in Belgium
- 1999 European Parliament election in Denmark
- 1999 European Parliament election
- 1999 European Parliament election in Aosta Valley
- 1999 European Parliament election in Veneto
- 1999 European Parliament election in Finland
- 1999 European Parliament election in France
- 1999 European Parliament election in Germany
- 1999 European Parliament election in Greece
- 1999 European Parliament election in Ireland
- 1999 European Parliament election in Italy
- 1999 European Parliament election in Luxembourg
- 1999 European Parliament election in the Netherlands
- 1999 European Parliament election in Portugal
- 1999 European Parliament election in Spain
- 1999 European Parliament election in Sweden
- 1999 European Parliament election in the United Kingdom
- 1999 European Parliament election in France

=== Germany ===
- 1999 Brandenburg state election
- 1999 Bremen state election
- 1999 European Parliament election in Germany
- 1999 German presidential election
- 1999 Hesse state election
- 1999 Saarland state election
- 1999 Saxony state election

=== Italy ===
- 1999 European Parliament election in Aosta Valley
- 1999 European Parliament election in Italy
- 1999 European Parliament election in Veneto
- 1999 Italian presidential election
- 1999 Sardinian regional election

=== Spain ===
- 1999 Catalan regional election
- 1999 Aragonese regional election
- 1999 Valencian regional election
- 1999 European Parliament election in Spain
- 1999 Spanish local elections

=== Switzerland ===
- 1999 Swiss Federal Council election
- 1999 Swiss federal election

=== Turkey ===
- 1999 Turkish general election
- 1999 Turkish local elections

=== United Kingdom ===
- 1999 Eddisbury by-election
- 1999 European Parliament election in the United Kingdom
- 1999 Hamilton South by-election
- 1999 Kensington and Chelsea by-election
- 1999 Leeds Central by-election
- 1999 Liberal Democrats leadership election
- 1999 United Kingdom local elections
- 1999 Scottish local elections
- 1999 National Assembly for Wales election
- 1999 Scottish Parliament election
- 1999 Wigan by-election

==== United Kingdom local ====
- 1999 United Kingdom local elections
- 1999 Scottish local elections

===== English local =====
- 1999 Adur Council election
- 1999 Allerdale Council election
- 1999 Alnwick Council election
- 1999 Amber Valley Council election
- 1999 Arun Council election
- 1999 Ashfield Council election
- 1999 Ashford Council election
- 1999 Aylesbury Vale Council election
- 1999 Babergh Council election
- 1999 Barrow-in-Furness Council election
- 1999 Bolton Council election
- 1999 Brentwood Council election
- 1999 Bromsgrove Council election
- 1999 Burnley Council election
- 1999 Bury Council election
- 1999 Calderdale Council election
- 1999 Cheltenham Council election
- 1999 Cherwell District Council election
- 1999 Chorley Council election
- 1999 Craven Council election
- 1999 Dacorum Council election
- 1999 Dartford Council election
- 1999 Daventry Council election
- 1999 Derby Council election
- 1999 Eastleigh Council election
- 1999 Ellesmere Port and Neston Council election
- 1999 Epping Forest Council election
- 1999 Fareham Council election
- 1999 Fylde Council election
- 1999 Gateshead Council election
- 1999 Gosport Council election
- 1999 Halton Council election
- 1999 Harlow Council election
- 1999 Hart Council election
- 1999 Hartlepool Council election
- 1999 Hastings Council election
- 1999 Hinckley and Bosworth Council election
- 1999 Hull Council election
- 1999 Hyndburn Council election
- 1999 Ipswich Borough Council election
- 1999 Kettering Borough Council election
- 1999 Knowsley Council election
- 1999 Leeds City Council election
- 1999 Lichfield Council election
- 1999 City of Lincoln Council election
- 1999 Liverpool Council election
- 1999 Manchester Council election
- 1999 Mid Sussex Council election
- 1999 Mole Valley Council election
- 1999 New Forest Council election
- 1999 Newcastle-under-Lyme Council election
- 1999 Northampton Council election
- 1999 Oldham Council election
- 1999 Oxford City Council election
- 1999 Penwith Council election
- 1999 Portsmouth Council election
- 1999 Preston Council election
- 1999 Purbeck Council election
- 1999 Redditch Council election
- 1999 Restormel Council election
- 1999 Rochdale Council election
- 1999 Rochford Council election
- 1999 Rossendale Council election
- 1999 Rugby Council election
- 1999 Runnymede Council election
- 1999 Rushmoor Council election
- 1999 Ryedale Council election
- 1999 Salford Council election
- 1999 Scarborough Council election
- 1999 Sedgefield Council election
- 1999 Sedgemoor Council election
- 1999 Sefton Council election
- 1999 Solihull Council election
- 1999 South Gloucestershire Council election
- 1999 South Lakeland Council election
- 1999 South Oxfordshire Council election
- 1999 South Ribble Council election
- 1999 South Tyneside Council election
- 1999 Southampton Council election
- 1999 Southend-on-Sea Council election
- 1999 St Albans City and District Council election
- 1999 St Helens Council election
- 1999 Stevenage Council election
- 1999 Stratford-on-Avon Council election
- 1999 Swindon Council election
- 1999 Tamworth Council election
- 1999 Tandridge Council election
- 1999 Three Rivers Council election
- 1999 Thurrock Council election
- 1999 Tonbridge and Malling Council election
- 1999 Trafford Council election
- 1999 Tunbridge Wells Council election
- 1999 Tynedale Council election
- 1999 Vale of White Horse Council election
- 1999 Wakefield Council election
- 1999 Watford Council election
- 1999 Waveney Council election
- 1999 Welwyn Hatfield Council election
- 1999 West Devon Council election
- 1999 West Lancashire Council election
- 1999 West Lindsey Council election
- 1999 West Wiltshire Council election
- 1999 Weymouth and Portland Council election
- 1999 Wigan Council election
- 1999 Winchester Council election
- 1999 Wirral Council election
- 1999 Woking Council election
- 1999 Wokingham Council election
- 1999 Wolverhampton Council election
- 1999 Worcester Council election
- 1999 Worthing Council election
- 1999 Wyre Forest Council election
- 1999 City of York Council election

===== Scottish local =====
- 1999 North Lanarkshire Council election
- 1999 Highland Council election

== North America ==
- 1999–2000 Belizean municipal elections
- 1999 Greenlandic general election

=== Canada ===
- 1999 Manitoba general election
- 1999 New Brunswick general election
- 1999 Newfoundland general election
- 1999 Northwest Territories general election
- 1999 Nova Scotia general election
- 1999 Nunavut general election
- 1999 Ontario general election
- 1999 Prince Edward Island Liberal Party leadership election
- 1999 Quebec municipal elections
- 1999 Saskatchewan general election

=== Caribbean ===
- 1999 Anguillan general election
- 1999 Antigua and Barbuda general election
- 1999 Barbadian general election
- 1999 British Virgin Islands general election
- 1999 Grenadian general election
- 1999 Trinidadian local elections
- 1999 Turks and Caicos Islands general election

=== United States ===
- 1999 United States elections

==== United States House of Representatives ====
- 1999 United States House of Representatives elections
- 1999 Louisiana's 1st congressional district special election
- 1999 California's 42nd congressional district special election

==== United States mayoral ====
- 1999 Arlington mayoral election
- 1999 Baltimore mayoral election
- 1999 Birmingham, Alabama mayoral election
- 1999 Burlington, Vermont mayoral election
- 1999 Chicago mayoral election
- 1999 Colorado Springs mayoral election
- 1999 Columbus, Ohio mayoral election
- 1999 Dallas mayoral election
- 1999 Denver mayoral election
- 1999 Des Moines mayoral election
- 1999 Durham mayoral election
- 1999 Evansville, Indiana, mayoral election
- 1999 Fort Wayne mayoral election
- 1999 Green Bay mayoral election
- 1999 Hartford mayoral election
- 1999 Houston mayoral election
- 1999 Indianapolis mayoral election
- 1999 Knoxville mayoral election
- 1999 Las Vegas mayoral election
- 1999 Lincoln, Nebraska mayoral election
- 1999 Madison mayoral election
- 1999 Manchester, New Hampshire, mayoral election
- 1999 Philadelphia mayoral election
- 1999 Phoenix mayoral election
- 1999 Raleigh mayoral election
- 1999 Salt Lake City mayoral election
- 1999 San Francisco mayoral election
- 1999 South Bend mayoral election
- 1999 Springfield, Massachusetts mayoral election
- 1999 Tampa mayoral election
- 1999 Tucson mayoral election
- 1999 Worcester, Massachusetts mayoral election

==== United States lieutenant gubernatorial ====
- 1999 Louisiana lieutenant gubernatorial election

==== United States gubernatorial ====
- 1999 Kentucky gubernatorial election
- 1999 Louisiana gubernatorial election
- 1999 Mississippi gubernatorial election
- 1999 United States gubernatorial elections

== Oceania ==
- 1999 Cook Islands general election
- 1999 Fijian general election
- 1999 Marshall Islands general election
- 1999 Micronesian general election
- 1999 Micronesian referendum
- 1999 Tongan general election
- 1999 Niuean general election

=== Australia ===
- 1999 Blain by-election
- 1999 Burwood state by-election
- 1999 Holt by-election
- 1999 New South Wales state election
- 1999 Australian republic referendum
- 1999 Victorian state election

=== New Zealand ===
- 1999 New Zealand general election
- 1999 New Zealand justice referendum
- 1999 New Zealand general election

== South America ==
- 1999 Argentine general election
- 1999 Bolivian municipal elections
- 1999–2000 Chilean presidential election
- 1999 Guatemalan constitutional referendum
- 1999 Uruguayan general election
- 1999 Uruguayan referendum
- April 1999 Venezuelan constitutional referendum
- December 1999 Venezuelan constitutional referendum
- 1999 Guatemalan general election
- 1999 Panamanian general election
- 1999 Salvadoran presidential election
- 1999 Venezuelan Constituent Assembly election
