= 1999 Assembly election =

1999 Assembly election can refer to:

== India ==
- 1999 Maharashtra Legislative Assembly election
- 1999 Andhra Pradesh Legislative Assembly election
- 1999 Karnataka Legislative Assembly election

== Wales ==
- 1999 National Assembly for Wales election

== Venezuela ==
- 1999 Venezuelan Constituent Assembly election

== See also ==
- List of elections in 1999
