= 1999 Swiss Federal Council election =

Elections to the Swiss Federal Council were held on 15 December 1999 to elect all seven members of Switzerland's Federal Council. The 246 members of the United Federal Assembly elect the seven members individually by an absolute majority of votes, with the members serving for four years, beginning on 1 January 2000, or until resigning.

== Results ==
=== Seat held by Adolf Ogi ===
Candidate	Party	Canton	Round 1
Adolf Ogi	SVP	Zürich	191
Franz Steinegger	FDP	Uri	11
Others			27
Ballot papers distributed			245
Ballot papers returned			245
Invalid votes (of which spoiled)			16 (2)
Valid votes			229

=== Seat held by Kaspar Villiger ===
Candidate	Party	Canton	Round 1
Kaspar Villiger	FDP	Valais	187
Franz Steinegger	FDP	Uri	15
Others			31
Ballot papers distributed			244
Ballot papers returned			244
Invalid votes (of which spoiled)			11 (0)
Valid votes			233

=== Seat held by Ruth Dreifuss ===
Candidate	Party	Canton	Round 1
Ruth Dreifuss	SP	Geneva	148
Franz Steinegger	FDP	Uri	58
Others			29
Ballot papers distributed			244
Ballot papers returned			244
Invalid votes (of which spoiled)			9 (1)
Valid votes			235

=== Seat held by Moritz Leuenberger ===
Candidate	Party	Canton	Round 1
Moritz Leuenberger	SP	Zürich	154
Christoph Blocher	SVP	Zürich	58
Others			23
Ballot papers distributed			243
Ballot papers returned			243
Invalid votes (of which spoiled)			8 (2)
Valid votes			235

=== Seat held by Pascal Couchepin ===
Candidate	Party	Canton	Round 1
Pascal Couchepin	FDP	Valais	124
Franz Steinegger	FDP	Uri	20
Frank A. Meyer	None	Bern	19
Yves Christen	FDP	Valais	15
Christine Beerli	FDP	Bern	13
Others			33
Ballot papers distributed			245
Ballot papers returned			245
Invalid votes (of which spoiled)			21 (1)
Valid votes			224

=== Seat held by Ruth Metzler ===
Candidate	Party	Canton	Round 1
Ruth Metzler	CVP	Appenzell Innerrhoden	144
Chiara Simoneschi	CVP	Ticino	13
Rosmarie Zapfl	CVP	Zürich	11
Others			63
Ballot papers distributed			245
Ballot papers returned			242
Invalid votes (of which spoiled)			11 (0)
Valid votes			231

=== Seat held by Joseph Deiss ===
Candidate	Party	Canton	Round 1
Joseph Deiss	CVP	Fribourg	173
Peter Hess	CVP	Zug	10
Others			46
Ballot papers distributed			242
Ballot papers returned			241
Invalid votes (of which spoiled)			12 (5)
Valid votes			229
