= Giulietta Della Balda =

Sammarinese politician (1937 or 1938–2024)

Mayor of the City of San Marino
- In office 1994–2004
- Preceded by: Marino Albani
- Succeeded by: Alessandro Barulli

Personal details
- Born: 1937 or 1938
- Died: 27 April 2024 (aged 86)
- Children: 2

Giulietta Della Balda (1937 or 1938 – 27 April 2024) was a Sammarinese politician and civil servant. She served as the first directly elected mayor of the City of San Marino between 1994 and 2004.

== Career ==
In 1954, shortly after completing her studies, Della Balda joined the Secretariat of State of San Marino, where she worked until 1993.

In the first direct mayoral elections in San Marino, held in June 1994, Della Balda was elected mayor (Capitano di Castello) of the city of San Marino. She succeeded Marino Albani. As mayor, Della Balda established twinning arrangements between villages of Arbe in Croatia, the birthplace of the country's founder Saint Marinus, and San Leo, in Italy.

On 23 April 1996, accompanied by the secretary of state, Augusto Casali and the ambassador, Roberto Balsimelli, she met with the Mayor of New York, Rudy Giuliani, with whom she signed a proclamation of relations and friendship between the two cities. She organised the New Year's concert for the first time in 2000.

She was re-elected in the 1999 local elections with 62.71% of the votes for her final five-year term, and was succeeded by Alessandro Barulli in 2004.

== Personal life and death ==
She was married and had two sons.

Della Balda died on 27 April 2024 at the age of 86. The funeral took place on 30 April 2024 and was buried in Montalbo.
