= 1999 Redditch Borough Council election =

1999 UK local government election

The 1999 Redditch Borough Council election took place on 6 May 1999 to elect members of Redditch Borough Council in the West Midlands region, England. One third of the council was up for election and the Labour Party stayed in overall control of the council.

After the election, the composition of the council was:

- Labour 20
- Conservative 6
- Liberal Democrat 3

== Campaign ==
In total 32 candidates stood for the 10 seats that were up for election. Nine of the ten seats were held by the Labour party before the election, with the remaining seat being Conservative. The Labour Party were confident of remaining in control of the council but the Conservatives and Liberal Democrats were hoping to make gains. A controversial issue in the election was a recent 2 million pound cost-cutting exercise, which the Labour council said had been necessary to safeguard the council's finances but the Conservatives criticised it as having cut services and left residents unhappy. Other major issues in the election included housing, play areas, crime, proposed building developments and the performance of the national Labour government.

== Election result ==
The results saw the defeat of the Labour deputy leader, David Cartwright, in Crabbs Cross ward where the Conservatives gained the seat. Labour also lost their mayor, Andrew Fry, in the election but remained firmly in control of the council. Following the election Phil Mould was elected to succeed David Cartwright as the Labour deputy leader of the council.

Redditch local election result 1999
Party	Seats	Gains	Losses	Net gain/loss	Seats %	Votes %	Votes	+/−
Labour	6			-3	60.0			
Conservative	3			+2	30.0			
Liberal Democrats	1			+1	10.0			
