= 1999 Phoenix mayoral election =

- September 7, 1999

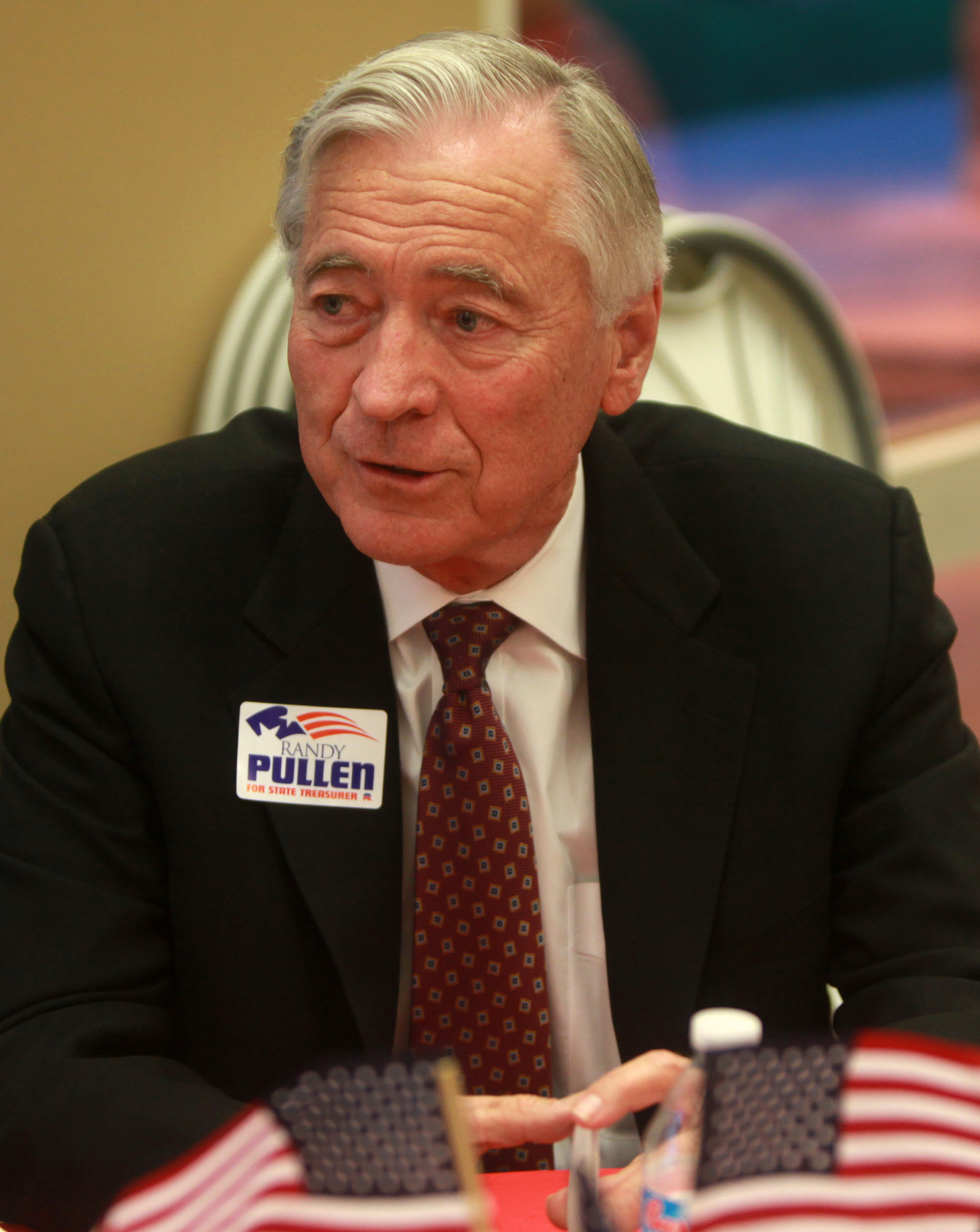
Candidate	Skip Rimsza	Randy Pullen
Party	Nonpartisan	Nonpartisan
Popular vote	52,053	31,885
Percentage	59.43%	36.40%
Mayor before election
Skip Rimsza
Republican
Elected mayor
Skip Rimsza
Republican

The 1999 Phoenix mayoral election was held on September 7, 1999, in order to elect the Mayor of Phoenix. Incumbent Mayor Skip Rimsza won re-election to a second full term against his opponents and fellow Nonpartisan candidates Randy Pullen and Patrick Dardis.

== General Election ==
The general election was held on September 7, 1999. Incumbent Mayor Skip Rimsza won re-election by a margin of 20,168 votes against his foremost opponent and fellow Nonpartisan candidate Randy Pullen, thereby retaining Republican control over the office of Mayor of Phoenix, Arizona.

=== Results ===
Phoenix mayoral election, 1999
Party	Candidate	Votes	%
Nonpartisanism	Skip Rimsza (incumbent)	52,053	59.43
Nonpartisanism	Randy Pullen	31,885	36.40
Nonpartisanism	Patrick Dardis	3,656	4.17
Total votes		87,594	100.00
Republican hold			

== See also ==
- List of mayors of Phoenix
