= Crabbs Cross =

District of Redditch, Worcestershire, England

Coordinates: 52.281903°N 1.940889°W

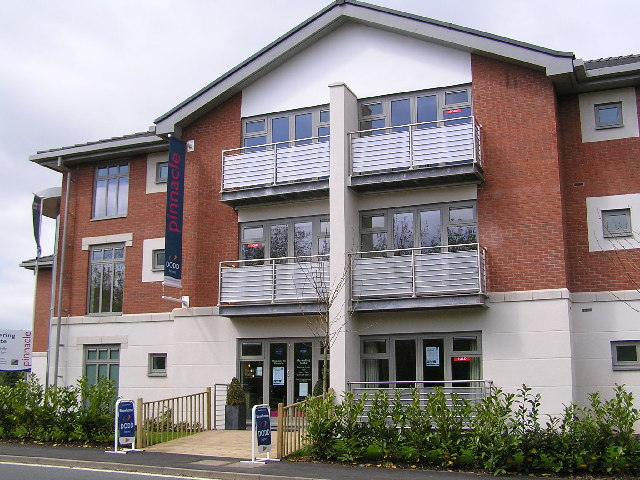
- New luxury apartments recently built at Crabbs Cross.

- Location within Worcestershire
- OS grid reference: SP041648
- District: Redditch
- Shire county: Worcestershire
- Region: West Midlands
- Country: England
- Sovereign state: United Kingdom
- Post town: REDDITCH
- Postcode district: B97
- Dialling code: 01527
- Police: West Mercia
- Fire: Hereford and Worcester
- Ambulance: West Midlands
- UK Parliament: Redditch

Crabbs Cross is a district of Redditch in Worcestershire, England.

Crabbs Cross gets its name from the crossroads, known nowadays as the 'Star and Garter Island'. Historically, Crabbs Cross was the junction of Crabbs Cross Lane, with Evesham Road (A441) and the Slough.
