= 1999 South Lakeland District Council election =

1999 UK local government election

The 1999 South Lakeland District Council election took place on 6 May 1999 to elect members of South Lakeland District Council in Cumbria, England. The whole council was up for election with boundary changes since the last election in 1998. The council stayed under no overall control.

== Election result ==
South Lakeland local election result 1999
Party	Seats	Gains	Losses	Net gain/loss	Seats %	Votes %	Votes	+/−
Liberal Democrats	21			+1	40.4			
Conservative	15			+2	28.8			
Labour	10			0	19.2			
Independent	6			-3	11.5			

== Ward results ==
Arnside and Beetham
Party	Candidate	Votes	%	±%
Liberal Democrats	Patricia Himsworth	744	48.8	
Conservative	J Gibson	743	48.7	
Conservative	A Taylor	715	46.9	
Liberal Democrats	David Scarisbrick*	701	45.9	
Majority		28	1.8	
Turnout			44.1	

Broughton
Party	Candidate	Votes	%	±%
Liberal Democrats	Joss Curwen*	801	92.3	
Labour	G Baddeley	67	7.7	
Majority		734	84.6	
Turnout			46.9	

Burneside
Party	Candidate	Votes	%	±%
Liberal Democrats	Claire Chorley*	439	83.6	
Labour	Ms D Horner	86	16.4	
Majority		353	67.2	
Turnout			33.1	

Burton & Holme
Party	Candidate	Votes	%	±%
Conservative	Roger Bingham*	694	79.1	
Liberal Democrats	E Phillips	183	20.9	
Majority		511	58.2	
Turnout			43.2	

Cartmel
Party	Candidate	Votes	%	±%
Independent	Leslie Hadwin*	unopposed		
Majority		N/A	N/A	
Turnout		N/A	N/A	

Coniston
Party	Candidate	Votes	%	±%
Independent	Derek Butterworth*	unopposed		
Majority		N/A	N/A	
Turnout		N/A	N/A	

Crake Valley
Party	Candidate	Votes	%	±%
Liberal Democrats	Noel Spendlove*	409	68.6	
Conservative	Robert Webster	187	31.4	
Majority		222	37.2	
Turnout			41.3	

Crooklands
Party	Candidate	Votes	%	±%
Conservative	John Galbraith*	462	71.0	
Liberal Democrats	B Chandler	138	21.2	
Labour	P Horner	51	7.8	
Majority		324	49.8	
Turnout			37.6	

Grange
Party	Candidate	Votes	%	±%
Conservative	Reginald Parker*	894	56.1	
Liberal Democrats	Robert Leach*	840	52.7	
Conservative	William Wearing	751	47.1	
Liberal Democrats	P Fitt	606	38.0	
Majority		89		
Turnout			45.5	

Hawkshead
Party	Candidate	Votes	%	±%
Liberal Democrats	E Diggle*	302	51.7	
Conservative	Oliver Pearson	282	48.3	
Majority		20	3.4	
Turnout			38.9	

Holker
Party	Candidate	Votes	%	±%
Independent	J Briggs*	unopposed		
Majority		N/A	N/A	
Turnout		N/A	N/A	

Kendal Castle
Party	Candidate	Votes	%	±%
Liberal Democrats	John Studholme*	353	55.5	
Conservative	D Bowen	175	27.5	
Labour	Janet Brooks	108	17.0	
Majority		178	28.0	
Turnout			41.0	

Kendal Far Cross
Party	Candidate	Votes	%	±%
Liberal Democrats	Sue Critchley*	355	71.7	
Conservative	Ms E Bothwick	73	14.7	
Labour	K Alderson	67	13.5	
Majority		282	57.0	
Turnout			29.7	

Kendal Fell
Party	Candidate	Votes	%	±%
Labour	Robin Yates*	353	62.5	
Liberal Democrats	Geoffrey Cook	212	37.5	
Majority		141	25.0	
Turnout			39.2	

Kendal Glebelands
Party	Candidate	Votes	%	±%
Labour	Robert Rothwell*	304	48.3	
Conservative	Ms R Wilkinson	219	34.8	
Liberal Democrats	A Gill	106	16.9	
Majority		85	13.5	
Turnout			39.9	

Kendal Heron Hill
Party	Candidate	Votes	%	±%
Liberal Democrats	Stephen Shine	415	73.6	
Conservative	Anthony Coles	92	16.3	
Labour	D Longmire	57	10.1	
Majority		323	57.3	
Turnout			38.6	

Kendal Highgate
Party	Candidate	Votes	%	±%
Labour	Rita Molloy	250	47.8	
Liberal Democrats	D Lawson	201	38.4	
Conservative	Frank Brooks	72	13.8	
Majority		49	9.4	
Turnout			34.7	

Kendal Kirkland
Party	Candidate	Votes	%	±%
Labour	Avril Dobson*	391	81.5	
Liberal Democrats	P Drury	89	18.5	
Majority		302	63.0	
Turnout			32.6	

Kendal Mintsfeet
Party	Candidate	Votes	%	±%
Liberal Democrats	Angela Barratt*	258	63.2	
Conservative	Helen Graham	86	21.1	
Labour	Alan Whitton	64	15.7	
Majority		172	42.1	
Turnout			25.5	

Kendal Nether
Party	Candidate	Votes	%	±%
Liberal Democrats	Chris Mayho	322	49.8	
Labour	Paul Braithwaite*	272	42.1	
Conservative	Melvin Mackie	52	8.0	
Majority		50	7.7	
Turnout			44.1	

Kendal Oxenholme
Party	Candidate	Votes	%	±%
Liberal Democrats	Philip Ball*	311	58.3	
Labour	Helen Speed	155	29.1	
Conservative	Ms J Hermitage	67	12.6	
Majority		156	29.2	
Turnout			32.9	

Kendal Parks
Party	Candidate	Votes	%	±%
Liberal Democrats	Brendan Jameson	434	81.1	
Conservative	Ms F Bishop	63	11.8	
Labour	G Jackson	38	7.1	
Majority		371	69.3	
Turnout			34.1	

Kendal Stonecross
Party	Candidate	Votes	%	±%
Liberal Democrats	Graham Vincent	357	49.0	
Conservative	M Graham*	296	40.6	
Labour	Ms V Kelly	76	10.4	
Majority		61	8.4	
Turnout			45.6	

Kendal Strickland
Party	Candidate	Votes	%	±%
Labour	Jean Ewing*	414	72.0	
Liberal Democrats	G Crank	81	14.1	
Conservative	J Houldon	80	13.9	
Majority		333	57.9	
Turnout			38.1	

Kendal Underley
Party	Candidate	Votes	%	±%
Labour	Jim Blamire*	537	87.3	
Liberal Democrats	James McKeefery	78	12.7	
Majority		459	74.6	
Turnout			39.1	

Kirkby Lonsdale
Party	Candidate	Votes	%	±%
Conservative	Barclay Stainton	640	65.8	
Independent	David Brooks*	332	34.2	
Majority		308	31.6	
Turnout			53.6	

Lakes Ambleside
Party	Candidate	Votes	%	±%
Liberal Democrats	David Vatcher*	577	45.6	
Liberal Democrats	Robert Barker	469	37.1	
Independent	George Middleton	455	36.0	
Independent	Brian Hewitt*	398	31.5	
Conservative	Susan Hunt	236	18.7	
Labour	Maureen Colquhoun	134	10.6	
Majority		14	1.1	
Turnout			39.0	

Lakes Grasmere
Party	Candidate	Votes	%	±%
Independent	Elizabeth Braithwaite*	408	75.7	
Liberal Democrats	A Hunt	131	24.3	
Majority		277	51.4	
Turnout			38.6	

Levens
Party	Candidate	Votes	%	±%
Liberal Democrats	Brenda Woof*	503	64.6	
Conservative	B Higgins	276	35.4	
Majority		227	29.2	
Turnout			53.6	

Low Furness and Swarthmoor
Party	Candidate	Votes	%	±%
Liberal Democrats	Betty Wallis*	862	53.6	
Conservative	William Tyson	678	42.1	
Liberal Democrats	David Foot	613	38.1	
Conservative	C Liversedge	386	24.0	
Labour	Richard Scott	278	17.3	
Majority		65	4.0	
Turnout			38.2	

Lyth Valley
Party	Candidate	Votes	%	±%
Conservative	Enid Robinson*	344	62.8	
Liberal Democrats	Gwyneth Raymond	146	26.6	
Labour	Keith Fawcett	58	10.6	
Majority		198	36.2	
Turnout			32.8	

Milnthorpe
Party	Candidate	Votes	%	±%
Liberal Democrats	Malcolm Alston*	387	74.3	
Conservative	T Simister	134	25.7	
Majority		253	48.6	
Turnout			33.5	

Natland
Party	Candidate	Votes	%	±%
Conservative	Alan Bobbett*	375	59.1	
Liberal Democrats	R Kirkham	174	27.4	
Labour	B McKee	85	13.4	
Majority		201	31.7	
Turnout			40.7	

Sedbergh
Party	Candidate	Votes	%	±%
Conservative	Kevin Lancaster*	754	60.2	
Conservative	Paul Winn	699	55.8	
Independent	Colin Gardner*	496	39.6	
Liberal Democrats	Sydney McLennan	231	18.5	
Majority		203	31.7	
Turnout			40.6	

Staveley-in-Cartmel
Party	Candidate	Votes	%	±%
Conservative	Michael Bentley	319	53.5	
Liberal Democrats	Gordon Jenkinson	277	46.5	
Majority		42	7.0	
Turnout			41.2	

Staveley-in-Westmorland
Party	Candidate	Votes	%	±%
Liberal Democrats	Stan Collins*	561	71.6	
Conservative	George Richardson	176	22.5	
Labour	Ms D Wilson	46	5.9	
Majority		385	49.1	
Turnout			45.7	

Ulverston Central
Party	Candidate	Votes	%	±%
Labour	David Miller*	393	67.5	
Conservative	Peter Hornby	189	32.5	
Majority		204	35.0	
Turnout			35.1	

Ulverston East
Party	Candidate	Votes	%	±%
Labour	Robert Bolton*	479	85.8	
Conservative	Ms P Prosser	79	14.2	
Majority		400	71.6	
Turnout			36.5	

Ulverston North
Party	Candidate	Votes	%	±%
Conservative	Colin Hodgson*	409	58.8	
Labour	Ms J Povey	226	32.5	
Liberal Democrats	B Rabone	60	8.6	
Majority		183	26.3	
Turnout			44.9	

Ulverston South
Party	Candidate	Votes	%	±%
Conservative	Alfred Jarvis	312	52.4	
Labour	Ms V Miller*	283	47.6	
Majority		29	4.8	
Turnout			41.4	

Ulverston Town
Party	Candidate	Votes	%	±%
Labour	Philip Lister*	489	64.5	
Conservative	M Wilding	269	35.5	
Majority		220	29.0	
Turnout			48.3	

Ulverston West
Party	Candidate	Votes	%	±%
Conservative	Janette Jenkinson*	482	75.1	
Labour	Fay Plant	160	24.9	
Majority		322	50.2	
Turnout			39.4	

Whinfell
Party	Candidate	Votes	%	±%
Independent	William Robinson	unopposed		
Majority		N/A	N/A	
Turnout		N/A	N/A	

Windermere Applethwaite
Party	Candidate	Votes	%	±%
Conservative	Jennifer Borer*	364	60.9	
Liberal Democrats	H Hatley	234	39.1	
Majority		130	21.8	
Turnout			36.0	

Windermere Bowness North
Party	Candidate	Votes	%	±%
Liberal Democrats	Deirdre Cranwell*	428	52.8	
Conservative	Ms S Clayton	274	33.8	
Labour	Ms Y Stewart-Taylor	108	13.3	
Majority		154	19.0	
Turnout			47.0	

Windermere Bowness South
Party	Candidate	Votes	%	±%
Conservative	Jane Hoyle*	344	59.3	
Liberal Democrats	Ms P Campbell	236	40.7	
Majority		108	18.6	
Turnout			36.5	

Windermere Town
Party	Candidate	Votes	%	±%
Liberal Democrats	Kathleen Atkinson*	331	48.6	
Conservative	Elizabeth Graham	246	36.1	
Labour	C Kelly-Goddard	104	15.3	
Majority		85	12.5	
Turnout			40.9	
