= 1999 City of York Council election =

1999 local election in England

City of York Council Election, 1999
- 6 May 1999

All 53 seats to City of York Council 27 seats needed for a majority
	First party	Second party
Leader	Rod Hills	Peter Vaughan
Party	Labour	Liberal Democrats
Leader since	1984	1995
Leader's seat	Clifton	Huntington and New Earswick
Last election	30	18
Seats won	27	22
Seat change	▼3	▲4
Popular vote	32,654	41,845
Percentage	34.2%	43.9%
	Third party	Fourth party
Leader	Andrew Armstrong (retiring)
Party	Conservative	Independent
Leader since	1995
Leader's seat	Copmanthorpe
Last election	3	2
Seats won	3	1
Seat change	0	▼1
Popular vote	17,428	16,117
Percentage	18.3%	13.5%
Leader of the Council before election
Rod Hills
Labour
Leader of the Council after election
Rod Hills
Labour

Elections to City of York Council were held on 6 May 1999. All 53 council seats in the city were up for election and the Labour Party kept overall control of the council.

== Election result ==
City of York Council election 1999
Party	Candidates						Votes		
Party	Stood	Elected	Gained	Unseated	Net	% of total	%	No.	Net %
Labour	53	27	0	3	-3	50.9%	34.2%	32,654	
Liberal Democrats	53	22	4	0	+4	41.5%	43.9%	41,845	
Conservative	39	3	1	1	0	5.7%	18.3%	17,428	
Independent	2	1	1	2	-1	1.9%	1.7%	1,663	
Green	9	0	0	0	0	0%	1.8%	1,750	
Socialist Labour	1	0	0	0	0	0%	0.1%	76	

== Ward results ==
=== Acomb ward ===
Acomb
Party	Candidate	Votes	%	±%
Labour	DA Horton *	1,037	31.2	−4.3
Labour	TL Simpson-Laing	871	26.2	−9.3
Conservative	EJ Fulford	380	11.4	1.5
Conservative	A Potter	370	11.1	0.6
Liberal Democrats	AL Doig	345	10.4	6.0
Liberal Democrats	JD Dales †	325	9.8	5.5
Turnout		3,328	32.9	−10.1
Labour hold				
Labour hold				

* Represented the Acomb ward of York City Council, 1986-1996, and the Acomb ward of City of York Council, 1995-1999

† Represented the Foxwood ward of York City Council, 1979-1983

=== Beckfield ward ===
Beckfield
Party	Candidate	Votes	%	±%
Labour	RT Cregan *	965	30.5	−3.9
Labour	RE Potter	874	27.6	−4.8
Liberal Democrats	AJ Law	558	17.7	11.2
Conservative	CAG Brooks	398	12.6	1.8
Liberal Democrats	SH McCloy	366	11.6	6.3
Turnout		3,161	33.9	−11.2
Labour hold				
Labour hold				

* Represented the Beckfield ward of City of York Council, 1995-1999

=== Bishophill ward ===
Bishophill
Party	Candidate	Votes	%	±%
Labour	DM Merrett *	875	25.9	−8.8
Labour	CA Wallace †	729	21.6	−9.7
Green	AD Chase	358	10.6	5.4
Conservative	RA Schofield	335	9.9	−0.1
Conservative	CB Megone	332	9.8	0.5
Liberal Democrats	MR Bartlett	325	9.6	5.0
Liberal Democrats	DJ Grainger	227	6.7	1.8
Green	A White	201	5.9	5.9
Turnout		3,382	34.8	−5.7
Labour hold				
Labour hold				

* Represented the Bishophill ward of York City Council, 1982-1996, and the Bishophill ward of City of York Council, 1995-1999

† Represented the Bishophill ward of York City Council, 1987-1996, and the Bishophill ward of City of York Council, 1995-1999

=== Bootham ward ===
Bootham
Party	Candidate	Votes	%	±%
Labour	K Cooper *	806	35.8	−4.0
Labour	KW King †	701	31.2	−6.3
Liberal Democrats	DS Begbie	298	13.3	7.5
Liberal Democrats	ZA Varley	225	10.0	5.3
Conservative	D Dawson	219	9.7	3.6
Turnout		2,249	25.8	−10.4
Labour hold				
Labour hold				

* Represented the Bootham ward of York City Council, 1973-1996, the Bootham division of North Yorkshire County Council, 1973-1996, and the Bootham ward of City of York Council, 1995-1999

† Represented the Bootham ward of York City Council, 1982-1996, the Fishergate division of North Yorkshire County Council, 1985-1989, and the Bootham ward of City of York Council, 1995-1999

=== Clifton ward ===
Clifton
Party	Candidate	Votes	%	±%
Labour	RI Hills *	742	28.5	−5.9
Labour	A Jones †	740	28.4	−5.1
Conservative	NC Major	321	12.3	1.2
Conservative	SC Thompson	300	11.5	1.5
Liberal Democrats	KA Tarry	269	10.3	4.1
Liberal Democrats	D Waudby	234	9.0	4.1
Turnout		2,606	28.9	−11.1
Labour hold				
Labour hold				

* Represented the Bootham ward of York City Council, 1979-1996, the Clifton division of North Yorkshire County Council, 1981-1996, and the Clifton ward of City of York Council, 1995-1999

† Represented the Clifton ward of York City Council, 1994-1996, and the Clifton ward of City of York Council, 1995-1999

=== Clifton Without ward ===
The parish of Clifton Without

Clifton Without
Party	Candidate	Votes	%	±%
Liberal Democrats	SP Tarry *	733	62.3	14.8
Labour	AM Greagsby	314	26.7	−20.1
Conservative	TG Pearson	129	11.0	11.0
Turnout		1,176	35.6	−7.9
Liberal Democrats hold				

* Represented the Clifton Without ward of Ryedale District Council, 1991-1996, and the Clifton Without ward of City of York Council, 1995-1999

=== Copmanthorpe ward ===
The parishes of Acaster Malbis, Bishopthorpe, and Copmanthorpe

Copmanthorpe
Party	Candidate	Votes	%	±%
Liberal Democrats	DG Livesley	1,378	28.0	17.7
Conservative	JC Galvin	1,059	21.5	3.1
Liberal Democrats	DYP Khan	971	19.8	19.8
Labour	G Campbell-Thomas	787	16.0	−6.1
Labour	AJ MacDonald	721	14.7	−1.6
Turnout		4,916	43.8	−0.1
Liberal Democrats gain from Labour				
Conservative hold				

=== Dunnington and Kexby ward ===
The parishes of Dunnington and Kexby

Dunnington and Kexby
Party	Candidate	Votes	%	±%
Liberal Democrats	JA Greenwood	615	46.6	30.8
Independent	RF Carr *	597	45.2	−12.9
Labour	DL Scott	109	8.3	−6.9
Turnout		1,321	46.9	1.5
Liberal Democrats gain from Independent				

* Represented the Dunnington ward of Selby District Council, 1979-1996, and the Dunnington and Kexby ward of City of York Council, 1995-1999

=== Fishergate ward ===
Fishergate
Party	Candidate	Votes	%	±%
Labour	J Boardman *	910	22.8	−8.7
Labour	R Farrington †	778	19.5	−8.8
Conservative	RN Dickson ‡	642	16.1	4.3
Conservative	D Minns	627	15.7	5.1
Green	M Nicholson	312	7.8	3.2
Liberal Democrats	R Brown	310	7.8	2.7
Liberal Democrats	JG Cruickshank	254	6.4	1.8
Green	DJ Wilkinson	165	4.1	0.4
Turnout		3,998	34.4	−9.1
Labour hold				
Labour hold				

* Represented the Fishergate ward of York City Council, 1988-1996, and the Fishergate ward of City of York Council, 1995-1999

† Represented the Fishergate division of North Yorkshire County Council, 1993-1996, and the Fishergate ward of City of York Council, 1995-1999

‡ Represented the Fishergate division of North Yorkshire County Council, 1989-1993

=== Foxwood ward ===
Foxwood
Party	Candidate	Votes	%	±%
Liberal Democrats	SF Galloway *	1,800	27.0	4.2
Liberal Democrats	AL Reid †	1,720	25.8	4.0
Liberal Democrats	J Blakeborough	1,640	24.6	4.7
Labour	A Fraser	446	6.7	−2.2
Labour	ES Gouge	408	6.1	−2.3
Labour	J James ‡	399	6.0	−1.3
Conservative	IJ Farndale	247	3.7	0.8
Turnout		6,660	34.4	−3.9
Liberal Democrats hold				
Liberal Democrats hold				
Liberal Democrats hold				

* Represented the Westfield ward of York City Council, 1973-1979, the Foxwood ward of York City Council, 1979-1996, the Westfield division of North Yorkshire County Council, 1973-1985, the Foxwood division of North Yorkshire County Council, 1985-1996, and the Foxwood ward of City of York Council, 1995-1999

† Represented the Foxwood ward of York City Council, 1990-1996, and the Foxwood ward of City of York Council, 1995-1999

‡ Represented the Beckfield ward of York City Council, 1986-1996, and the Beckfield ward of City of York Council, 1995-1999

=== Fulford ward ===
The parish of Fulford

Fulford
Party	Candidate	Votes	%	±%
Labour	TM Brighton *	405	45.8	−2.4
Conservative	JE Mackfall	299	33.8	33.8
Liberal Democrats	AR Normandale	180	20.4	−5.9
Turnout		884	40.4	−6.0
Labour hold				

* Represented the Fulford ward of City of York Council, 1995-1999

=== Guildhall ward ===
Guildhall
Party	Candidate	Votes	%	±%
Labour	JM Looker *	780	24.9	−8.6
Labour	BWJE Watson †	667	21.3	−8.5
Conservative	KJ Beavan ‡	487	15.6	4.6
Conservative	AJ Mett	445	14.2	3.5
Liberal Democrats	CM Anderson	255	8.2	3.0
Liberal Democrats	L.A Hogg	223	7.1	2.2
Green	GM Williams	136	4.3	−0.5
Green	JS Cossham	134	4.3	4.3
Turnout		3,127	27.0	−9.5
Labour hold				
Labour hold				

* Represented the Guildhall division of North Yorkshire County Council, 1985-1996, and the Guildhall ward of City of York Council, 1995-1999

† Represented the Acomb ward of York City Council, 1979-1984, the Guildhall ward of York City Council, 1988-1996, the Acomb division of North Yorkshire County Council, 1981-1989, and the Guildhall ward of City of York Council, 1995-1999

‡ Represented the Micklegate ward of York City Council, 1991-1996

=== Haxby ward ===
The parish of Haxby

Haxby
Party	Candidate	Votes	%	±%
Liberal Democrats	H Briggs *	2,128	25.5	−0.9
Liberal Democrats	CM Hogg †	2,071	24.8	−0.2
Liberal Democrats	MR Watson	1,952	23.4	−2.6
Conservative	RJ Phillips	687	8.2	8.2
Conservative	RA Procter	636	7.6	7.6
Labour	GR Beacon	306	3.7	−4.3
Labour	IG Lowson	282	3.4	−3.9
Labour	MW Gaunt	280	3.4	−3.9
Turnout		8,342	39.9	−2.0
Liberal Democrats hold				
Liberal Democrats hold				
Liberal Democrats hold				

* Represented the Haxby North East ward of Ryedale District Council, 1991-1996, the Haxby / Strensall division of North Yorkshire County Council, 1993-1996, and the Haxby ward of City of York Council, 1995-1999

† Represented the Haxby / Wigginton division of North Yorkshire County Council, 1993-1996, and the Haxby ward of City of York Council, 1995-1999

=== Heslington ward ===
The parish of Heslington

Heslington
Party	Candidate	Votes	%	±%
Labour	MHK Brumby *	284	39.4	−22.0
Liberal Democrats	PA Hearn	154	21.4	21.4
Conservative	GER Hill	154	21.4	21.4
Green	D Biram	129	17.9	17.9
Turnout		721	21.4	−11.1
Labour hold				

* Represented the Heslington ward of Selby District Council, 1991-1996, and the Heslington ward of City of York Council, 1995-1999

=== Heworth ward ===
Heworth
Party	Candidate	Votes	%	±%
Labour	SE Braund *	1,051	30.5	−5.1
Labour	CA Waite †	1,027	29.8	−6.3
Conservative	D Gough	378	11.0	1.2
Conservative	DJ Hyland	356	10.3	1.1
Liberal Democrats	IM Cuthbertson	322	9.3	4.2
Liberal Democrats	IE Packington	315	9.1	4.9
Turnout		3,449	34.1	−9.6
Labour hold				
Labour hold				

* Represented the Heworth division of North Yorkshire County Council, 1989-1993, and the Heworth ward of City of York Council, 1995-1999

† Represented the Heworth ward of York City Council, 1980-1996, and the Heworth ward of City of York Council, 1995-1999

=== Heworth Without ward ===
The parish of Heworth Without

Heworth Without
Party	Candidate	Votes	%	±%
Liberal Democrats	MJ Bradley *	793	87.9	16.9
Labour	AS Dhesi	109	12.1	−16.9
Turnout		902	46.7	−9.7
Liberal Democrats hold				

* Represented the Heworth Without ward of Ryedale District Council, 1973-1983, the Osbaldwick and Heworth ward of Ryedale District Council, 1983-1996, and the Heworth Without ward of City of York Council, 1995-1999

=== Holgate ward ===
Holgate
Party	Candidate	Votes	%	±%
Labour	ES Edge *	826	22.6	−11.7
Labour	RE Scrase †	736	20.1	−12.4
Liberal Democrats	D Horwell ‡	730	20.0	11.9
Liberal Democrats	J Tull	689	18.8	11.5
Conservative	W Bennett	320	8.8	−0.2
Conservative	R Jackson	279	7.6	−1.1
Socialist Labour	JJ Stewart	76	2.1	2.1
Turnout		3,656	38.8	−4.9
Labour hold				
Labour hold				

* Represented the Holgate ward of City of York Council, 1995-1999

† Represented the Holgate ward of York City Council, 1992-1996, and the Holgate ward of City of York Council, 1995-1999

‡ Represented the Foxwood ward of York City Council, 1979-1988

=== Huntington and New Earswick ward ===
The parishes of Huntington and New Earswick

Huntington and New Earswick
Party	Candidate	Votes	%	±%
Liberal Democrats	DJ Henderson	1,961	23.3	2.2
Liberal Democrats	P Vaughan *	1,958	23.3	3.5
Liberal Democrats	CE Runciman	1,728	20.6	1.1
Labour	CB Woolley	760	9.0	−3.1
Labour	EC Macleod	718	8.5	−3.2
Conservative	BS Wiseman	642	7.7	7.7
Labour	ME Simon	637	7.6	−3.0
Turnout		8,405	32.2	−8.8
Liberal Democrats hold				
Liberal Democrats hold				
Liberal Democrats hold				

* Represented the Huntington North division of North Yorkshire County Council, 1993-1996, and the Huntington and New Earswick ward of City of York Council, 1995-1999

=== Knavesmire ward ===
Knavesmire
Party	Candidate	Votes	%	±%
Labour	RD Fletcher *	920	27.6	−9.8
Labour	TJ Walker †	850	25.5	−7.5
Conservative	MJ Garrity	442	13.3	2.8
Conservative	SJ Williams	426	12.8	2.4
Liberal Democrats	JM McCloy	195	5.9	1.5
Liberal Democrats	GG Talbot	180	5.4	1.2
Green	AC Martin	172	5.2	5.2
Green	DE King	143	4.3	4.3
Turnout		3,328	34.9	−5.9
Labour hold				
Labour hold				

* Represented the Knavesmire ward of York City Council, 1984-1996, and the Knavesmire ward of City of York Council, 1995-1999

† Represented the Knavesmire ward of York City Council, 1991-1996, and the Knavesmire ward of City of York Council, 1995-1999

=== Micklegate ward ===
Micklegate
Party	Candidate	Votes	%	±%
Conservative	GH Dean *	1,036	23.3	3.5
Labour	BA Bell †	1,033	23.3	−3.2
Conservative	KJ Creek	890	20.0	2.2
Labour	DG Evans	860	19.4	−5.9
Liberal Democrats	PL.B Reid	334	7.5	1.8
Liberal Democrats	GEF Thompson	287	6.5	1.6
Turnout		4,440	46.2	−7.6
Conservative gain from Labour				
Labour hold				

* Represented the Micklegate ward of York City Council, 1973-1996, and the Micklegate division of North Yorkshire County Council, 1993-1996

† Represented the Walmgate ward of York City Council, 1980-1988, and the Heworth ward of York City Council, 1990-1996, and the Micklegate ward of City of York Council, 1995-1999

=== Monk ward ===
Monk
Party	Candidate	Votes	%	±%
Labour	V Kind *	964	22.1	−3.8
Labour	PL Dodd *	956	21.9	−5.1
Liberal Democrats	D Kirk	639	14.7	8.3
Liberal Democrats	NWS Blitz	627	14.4	8.1
Conservative	SJ Mallett	589	13.5	−3.4
Conservative	WE Hanbury	582	13.4	−2.1
Turnout		4,357	40.7	−8.1
Labour hold				
Labour hold				

* Represented the Monk ward of City of York Council, 1995-1999

=== Osbaldwick ward ===
The parish of Osbaldwick

Osbaldwick
Party	Candidate	Votes	%	±%
Liberal Democrats	JP Morley *	537	58.4	12.5
Labour	FE Leesley	238	25.9	−15.9
Conservative	N Adams	144	15.7	15.7
Turnout		919	41.0	−7.5
Liberal Democrats hold				

* Represented the Osbaldwick / Heworth division of North Yorkshire County Council, 1985-1996

=== Rawcliffe and Skelton ward ===
The parishes of Rawcliffe and Skelton

Rawcliffe and Skelton
Party	Candidate	Votes	%	±%
Liberal Democrats	IM Waudby *	1,520	37.6	18.4
Liberal Democrats	MK Waudby	1,264	31.3	18.9
Conservative	TJ Ashman	489	12.1	2.9
Labour	AD Garbutt	388	9.6	−4.7
Labour	B Bothamley	382	9.4	−4.0
Turnout		4,043	40.5	−2.0
Liberal Democrats hold				
Liberal Democrats gain from Independent				

* Represented the Rawcliffe division of North Yorkshire County Council, 1989-1996, and the Rawcliffe and Skelton ward of City of York Council, 1995-1999

=== Strensall ward ===
The parishes of Earswick, Holtby, Murton, Stockton-on-the-Forest, and Strensall with Towthorpe

Strensall
Party	Candidate	Votes	%	±%
Liberal Democrats	MA Kirk *	1,003	33.4	9.3
Liberal Democrats	J Vaughan †	895	29.8	8.5
Conservative	C Marshall	571	19.0	3.2
Labour	GP Hodgson	275	9.2	−4.6
Labour	K Tomlinson	258	8.6	−2.4
Turnout		3,002	29.3	−15.3
Liberal Democrats hold				
Liberal Democrats hold				

* Represented the Skelton ward of Ryedale District Council, 1991-1996, and the Strensall ward of City of York Council, 1996-1999

† Represented the Huntington North ward of Ryedale District Council, 1991-1996, and the Strensall ward of City of York Council, 1995-1999

=== Upper Poppleton ward ===
The parishes of Askham Bryan, Askham Richard, Hessay, Nether Poppleton, Rufforth with Knapton, and Upper Poppleton

Upper Poppleton
Party	Candidate	Votes	%	±%
Liberal Democrats	QJA Macdonald *	1,183	26.6	3.2
Independent	JS Hopton	1,066	24.0	24.0
Liberal Democrats	PHF Powell	974	21.9	1.9
Conservative	KR Bushby	443	10.0	−10.1
Conservative	GK Moore *	441	9.9	−10.9
Labour	JC Overhill-Smith	207	4.7	−3.6
Labour	IA Simpson-Laing	127	2.9	−4.5
Turnout		4,441	51.6	−2.8
Liberal Democrats hold				
Independent gain from Conservative				

* Represented the Upper Poppleton ward of City of York Council, 1995-1999

=== Walmgate ward ===
Walmgate
Party	Candidate	Votes	%	±%
Labour	D Wilde *	779	28.6	−7.7
Labour	DW Smallwood †	748	27.5	−7.1
Conservative	P Thompson	342	12.6	3.6
Conservative	SE Anson	334	12.3	3.6
Liberal Democrats	AM Carter ‡	280	10.3	4.4
Liberal Democrats	CF Robertson	239	8.8	3.3
Turnout		2,722	26.4	−10.3
Labour hold				
Labour hold				

* Represented the Walmgate ward of York City Council, 1973-1996, and the Walmgate ward of City of York Council, 1995-1999

† Represented the Guildhall ward of York City Council, 1990-1996, and the Walmgate division of North Yorkshire County Council, 1985-1996, and the Walmgate ward of City of York Council, 1995-1999

‡ Represented the Haxby North East ward of Ryedale District Council, 1983-1996, and the Haxby ward of City of York Council, 1995-1999

=== Westfield ward ===
Westfield
Party	Candidate	Votes	%	±%
Liberal Democrats	S Galloway *	1,189	34.9	9.6
Liberal Democrats	AM Waller †	954	28.0	7.1
Labour	B Carradice ‡	618	18.2	−5.8
Labour	M Painter	499	14.7	−9.0
Conservative	R Hudson	144	4.2	1.1
Turnout		3,404	39.0	−12.5
Liberal Democrats hold				
Liberal Democrats gain from Labour				

* Represented the Westfield ward of York City Council, 1979-1996, the Westfield division of North Yorkshire County Council, 1993-1996, and the Westfield ward of City of York Council, 1995-1999

† Represented the Westfield ward of York City Council, 1994-1996

‡ Represented the Acomb ward of York City Council, 1988-1996, and the Westfield ward of City of York Council, 1995-1999

=== Wheldrake ward ===
The parishes of Deighton, Elvington, Naburn, and Wheldrake

Wheldrake
Party	Candidate	Votes	%	±%
Conservative	RJ Snowdon	513	39.2	−5.5
Liberal Democrats	M Vassie	466	35.6	18.3
Labour	JE Tetzner	329	25.2	−12.8
Turnout		1,308	44.0	5.8
Conservative hold				

=== Wigginton ward ===
The parish of Wigginton

Wigginton
Party	Candidate	Votes	%	±%
Liberal Democrats	AC Hall *	1,027	87.8	22.1
Labour	KD Smith	143	12.2	−5.9
Turnout		1,170	38.8	−8.9
Liberal Democrats hold				

* Represented the Haxby and Wigginton ward of Ryedale District Council, 1979-1983, the Wigginton ward of Ryedale District Council, 1987-1996, and the Wigginton ward of City of York Council, 1995-1999
