= Frank A. Meyer =

Swiss journalist

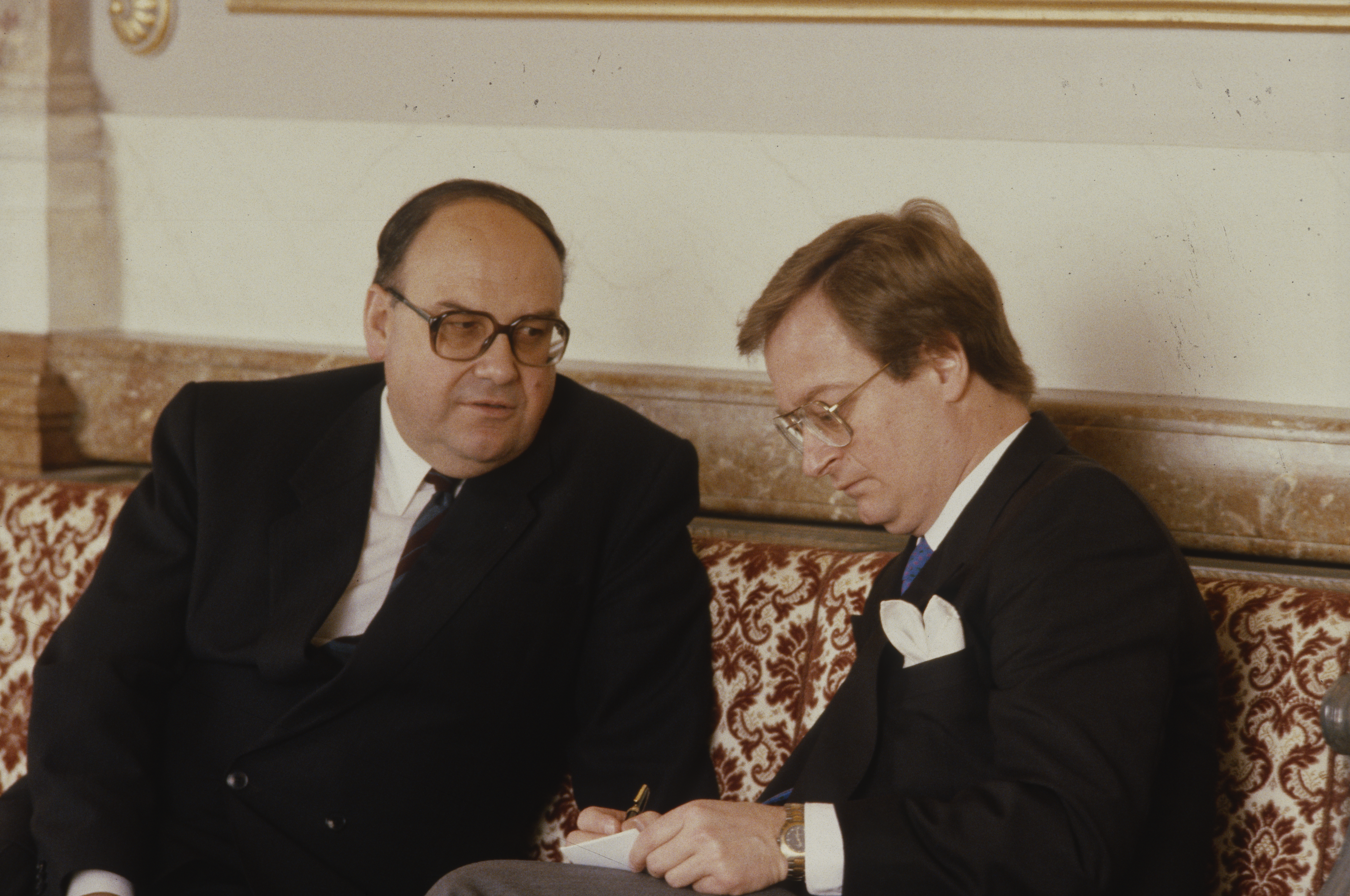
Frank A. Meyer (right) and politician Ernst Mühlemann in 1985

Frank Meyer (born 6 January 1944, in Biel/Bienne) is a Swiss journalist.

Meyer is the media consultant of Ringier Inc., the largest Swiss publishing house (Blick, Le Temps...), he is also Blick’s main strategist.

== Life ==
Growing up in the bilingual Biel as the son of a watchmaker, Meyer did an apprenticeship as a typesetter. From 1968 to 1980 he was a partner of Mario Cortesi at the media company in his hometown of Biel.
