= 1999 Tynedale District Council election =

1999 UK local government election

Elections to Tynedale District Council were held on 6 May 1999. The whole council was up for election, with boundary changes increasing the number of councillors by five, since the last election in 1995. The council stayed under no overall control.

== Election result ==
Tynedale local election result 1999
| Party | Seats | Gains | Losses | Net gain/loss | Seats % | Votes % | Votes | +/− |
|---|---|---|---|---|---|---|---|---|
| Conservative | 22 | | | +10 | 42.3 | | | |
| Labour | 14 | | | -5 | 26.9 | | | |
| Liberal Democrats | 10 | | | -2 | 19.2 | | | |
| Independent | 6 | | | +2 | 11.5 | | | |
