= 1999 Stratford-on-Avon District Council election =

1999 UK local government election

The 1999 Stratford-on-Avon District Council election took place on 6 May 1999 to elect members of Stratford-on-Avon District Council in Warwickshire, England. One third of the council was up for election and the council stayed under no overall control.

After the election, the composition of the council was:

- Conservative 24
- Liberal Democrat 20
- Independent 7
- Labour 4

== Campaign ==
Before the election the Liberal Democrats ran the council as a minority administration with the support of the independents. The Liberal Democrats held 23 seats, compared to 18 for the Conservatives, 9 independents and 5 Labour seats. 19 seats were contested in the election with both the Liberal Democrats and independents defending 7, compared to only 3 for the Conservatives and 2 for Labour.

The Conservatives were hoping to gain the 10 seats they needed in to win a majority on the council and pledged to sort out the finances of the council, increase CCTV and improve the management of tourism. However the Liberal Democrats defended their record in control of the council saying that they had eliminated the council's debts, while reducing council tax levels to the lowest yet. Meanwhile, Labour were aiming to make a couple of gains and said they would try and ensure more of the council's money was spent outside of the town centre.

== Election result ==
The results saw the Conservatives become the largest party on the council with 24 seats after making 6 gains, but failed to win a majority. This meant that the independents, despite losing 2 seats, held the balance of power on the council with 7 councillors.

Stratford-on-Avon local election result 1999
Party	Seats	Gains	Losses	Net gain/loss	Seats %	Votes %	Votes	+/−
Conservative	9			+6	47.4			
Liberal Democrats	5			-3	26.3			
Independent	4			-2	21.1			
Labour	1			-1	5.3			
