= 1999 Bromsgrove District Council election =

1999 UK local government election

The 1999 Bromsgrove District Council election took place on 6 May 1999 to elect members of Bromsgrove district council in Worcestershire, England. The whole council was up for election and the Conservative Party gained overall control of the council from the Labour Party.

== Campaign ==
The Labour party had won control of the council in the previous election in 1995 for the first time and were hopeful of staying in control of the council. They pledged to maintain bus passes for the elderly and press on with CCTV in the town centre. However the Conservatives attacked Labour for having increased council tax over the last four years, including 9.73% in the last year. A proposed development on the local recreation ground for an arts and leisure centre was a major issue in the campaign, with Labour saying it would be good for Bromsgrove, while the Conservatives pledged to try to save the recreation ground. During the campaign the Conservative party leader William Hague visited Bromsgrove with the local Member of Parliament Julie Kirkbride to rally party activists.

Before the election the Conservatives required a 7% swing to gain control of the council, with Bromsgrove seen as a key council in the local elections across England. A by-election in October 1998 in Catshill ward was seen as a good sign for the Conservatives after they gained the seat with a swing of over 25%. In total 80 candidates stood in the election from the Labour party, Conservatives, Liberal Democrats and the Wythall Ratepayers' and Residents' Association. Candidates included seven couples and former Conservative councillors such as Joy Buchby and Nick Psirides. Meanwhile, the only Liberal Democrat councillor, Sandra Docker, stood down at the election.

Just before the election there was controversy over Labour Party leaflets that were sent to pensioners claiming that the Conservatives would abolish free bus passes for pensioners. The Conservatives denied they would end the bus passes and reported Labour to the Data Protection Registrar, claiming that confidential council records had been used to send the leaflets to target pensioners, although Labour denied this.

== Election result ==
The results in Bromsgrove were one of the first to come in across the country and saw the Conservatives retake control of the council gaining 17 seats. Conservative gains included the Labour leader on the council, Trevor Porter in Sidemoor ward, and the council chairman, Trevor Crashley in Whitford ward. The Conservatives also made two wins in Sidemoor ward, where they had never won any seats before, with swings reaching up to 40% in some wards.

Defeated candidates saw a low turnout and the plans to develop the recreation ground as responsible for their defeats, with the neighbouring Labour MP Michael John Foster blaming the results on local, rather than national, issues. Following the election William Hague visited Bromsgrove again to celebrate the results, both in Bromsgrove and nationally. Overall turnout in the election was 37.4%.

Bromsgrove local election result 1999
Party	Seats	Gains	Losses	Net gain/loss	Seats %	Votes %	Votes	+/−
Conservative	30			+17	76.9	56.6	29,876	
Labour	7			-16	17.9	35.3	18,637	
Wythall Ratepayers' and Residents' Association	2			0	5.1	4.5	2,382	
Liberal Democrats	0			-1	0	3.6	1,912	

== Ward results ==
Alvechurch (3)
Party	Candidate	Votes	%	±%
Conservative	J Luck	1,108		
Conservative	J Griffiths	1,044		
Conservative	B Taylor	1,002		
Labour	D Waters	723		
Labour	S Oliver	677		
Labour	A Clewlow	604		
Turnout		5,158	37.3	

Barnt Green (2)
Party	Candidate	Votes	%	±%
Conservative	A Doyle	1,309		
Conservative	M Taylor	1,253		
Liberal Democrats	T Gray	458		
Labour	J Cochrane	412		
Turnout		3,432	43.1	

Beacon (2)
Party	Candidate	Votes	%	±%
Labour	D McGrath	598		
Labour	P Williamson	509		
Conservative	G Bennett	432		
Liberal Democrats	G Ray	298		
Turnout		1,837	34.5	

Catshill (3)
Party	Candidate	Votes	%	±%
Conservative	P Collins	1,095		
Conservative	S Bushby	999		
Conservative	D Gardner	941		
Labour	S Farr	551		
Labour	G Witcomb	543		
Labour	A Deakin	534		
Turnout		4,663	35.0	

Charford (2)
Party	Candidate	Votes	%	±%
Labour	L McNamara	829		
Labour	C Brooks	798		
Conservative	B Graham	494		
Conservative	J Pardoe	440		
Turnout		2,561	30.7	

Cofton Hackett
Party	Candidate	Votes	%	±%
Conservative	R Deeming	370	72.0	
Labour	J Peel	144	28.0	
Majority		226	44.0	
Turnout		514	35.5	

Drakes Cross (3)
Party	Candidate	Votes	%	±%
Conservative	J Dyer	811		
Wythall Ratepayers' and Residents' Association	G Denaro	662		
Wythall Ratepayers' and Residents' Association	J Gardener	659		
Wythall Ratepayers' and Residents' Association	L Wright	620		
Conservative	D Woodward-Sheath	592		
Labour	C Brooks	286		
Turnout		3,630	24.8	

Furlongs (2)
Party	Candidate	Votes	%	±%
Conservative	P Barnsley	932		
Conservative	T Matthews	834		
Labour	M Harford	318		
Turnout		2,084	36.9	

Hagley (2)
Party	Candidate	Votes	%	±%
Conservative	M Oliver	914		
Conservative	H Whitehouse	869		
Labour	A Zalin	274		
Turnout		2,057	34.9	

Majors Green
Party	Candidate	Votes	%	±%
Conservative	P Duddy	383	63.3	
Wythall Ratepayers' and Residents' Association	P Harrison	149	24.6	
Labour	E Holmes	73	12.1	
Majority		234	38.7	
Turnout		605	36.6	

Norton (3)
Party	Candidate	Votes	%	±%
Conservative	D Norton	1,542		
Conservative	C Lanham	1,466		
Conservative	N Psirides	1,418		
Labour	P Baker	892		
Labour	R Clayton	876		
Labour	W Newnes	831		
Turnout		7,025	43.9	

Sidemoor (3)
Party	Candidate	Votes	%	±%
Conservative	R Dent	844		
Labour	C Mole	736		
Conservative	J Hancox	733		
Conservative	B Gall	707		
Labour	T Porter	624		
Labour	G Hulett	620		
Liberal Democrats	M Parr	341		
Turnout		4,605	37.6	

South Wythall
Party	Candidate	Votes	%	±%
Conservative	S Peters	318	47.3	
Wythall Ratepayers' and Residents' Association	H Allen	292	43.5	
Labour	P O'Connor	62	9.2	
Majority		26	3.8	
Turnout		672	36.7	

Stoke Prior
Party	Candidate	Votes	%	±%
Conservative	C Tidmarsh	613	66.6	
Labour	A Wardle	308	33.4	
Majority		305	33.2	
Turnout		921	41.5	

Stoney Hill (2)
Party	Candidate	Votes	%	±%
Conservative	A Hadley	1,130		
Conservative	E Shaw	1,123		
Labour	C Rudge	753		
Labour	S Shannon	739		
Liberal Democrats	G Selway	155		
Turnout		3,900	46.9	

Tardebigge
Party	Candidate	Votes	%	±%
Conservative	P Whittaker	502	78.4	
Labour	R Cooke	138	21.6	
Majority		364	56.8	
Turnout		640	46.0	

Uffdown and Waseley (3)
Party	Candidate	Votes	%	±%
Labour	P McDonald	788		
Conservative	D Hancox	741		
Labour	C Wilson	636		
Labour	K McNamara	601		
Liberal Democrats	G Mack	438		
Turnout		3,204	39.3	

Whitford (3)
Party	Candidate	Votes	%	±%
Conservative	E Tibby	814		
Conservative	K Gall	776		
Conservative	G Pardoe	762		
Labour	T Crashley	704		
Labour	M Holmes	672		
Labour	J Marshall	631		
Liberal Democrats	M Mihailovic	222		
Turnout		4,581	36.9	

Woodvale
Party	Candidate	Votes	%	±%
Conservative	M Gill	565	78.7	
Labour	B Sutherland	153	21.3	
Majority		412	57.4	
Turnout		718	41.2	
