= Randy Pullen =

American political activist

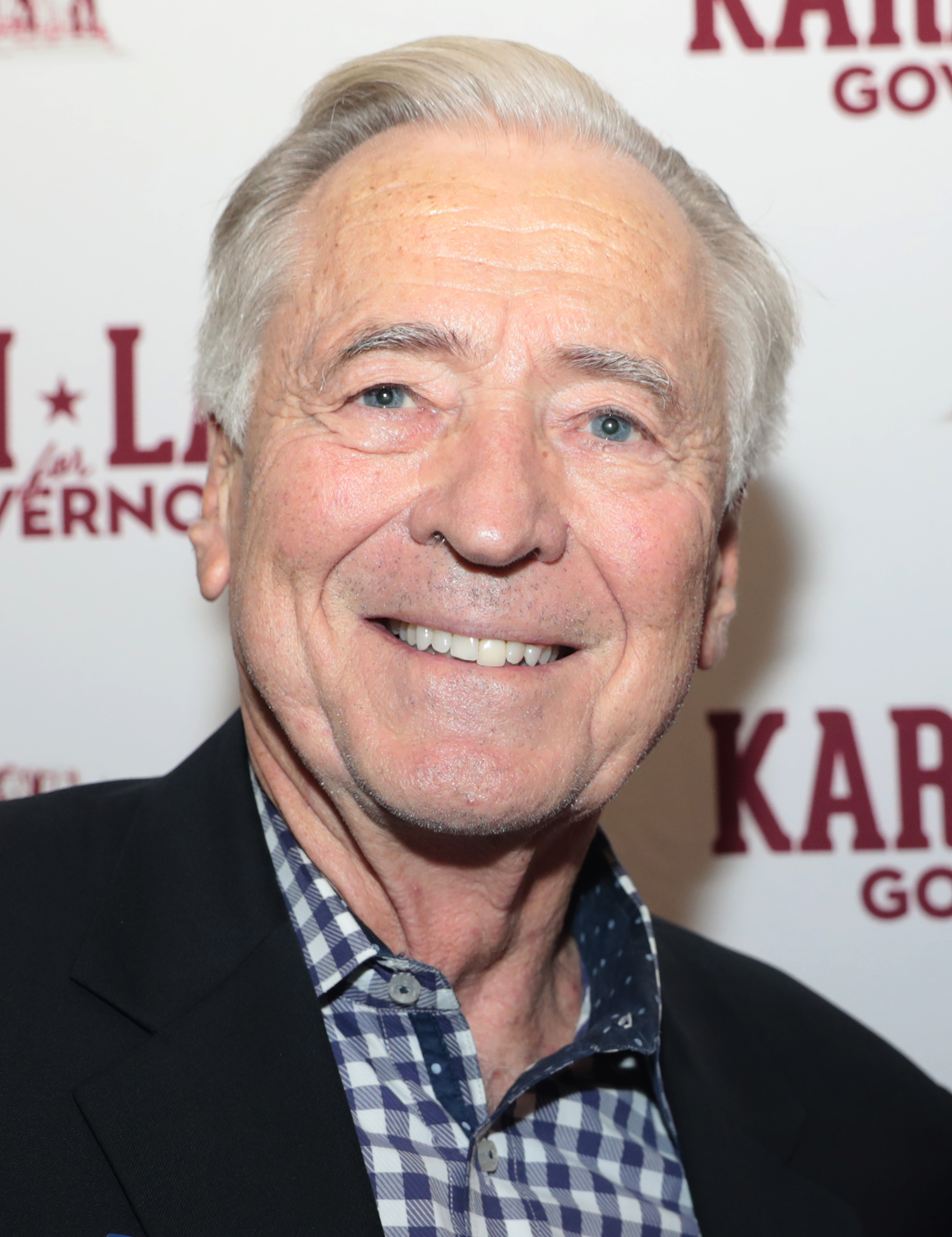

Chairman of the Arizona Republican Party
- In office 2007–2011
- Preceded by: Matt Salmon
- Succeeded by: Tom Morrissey

Randy Pullen is a Republican Party activist. He is a former chairman of the Arizona Republican Party; he served as chairman from 2007 to 2011. He is Chairman of WageWatch, a former Arizona Republican National Committeeman, and former Treasurer of the Republican National Committee. Pullman sought the Republican nomination for Arizona State Treasurer in 2014, losing in the primary to Jeff DeWit.
