= 1999 West Wiltshire District Council election =

1999 UK local government election

Elections to West Wiltshire District Council were held on 6 May 1999. The whole council was up for election and the Liberal Democrats held their overall control, winning twenty-seven seats while the Conservatives took ten, Independents four and the Labour Party two.

Three single-member wards, Ethandune, Melksham Roundpond, and Westbrook, had only one candidate in each case and thus were uncontested.

== Results ==
West Wiltshire local election result 1999
Party	Seats	Gains	Losses	Net gain/loss	Seats %	Votes %	Votes	+/−
Liberal Democrats	27	1	4	-3	62.8	47.9	20,890	-3
Conservative	10	5	1	+4	23.3	35.6	15,520	+4
Independent	4	0	0	0	9.3	6.3	2,768	0
Labour	2	0	-1	-1	4.7	5.2	2,290	-1
Green	0	0	0	0	0	4.9	2,149	0

== Ward results ==
=== Blackmore Forest ===
Blackmore Forest
Party	Candidate	Votes	%	±%
Liberal Democrats	Nicola Mary Remsik	342		
Conservative	Andrew George Milton	340		
Labour	Geoffrey Alan Mitcham	211		
Majority		2		
Turnout			25.4	
Liberal Democrats hold		Swing		

=== Bradford-on-Avon North ===
Bradford-on-Avon North (2)
Party	Candidate	Votes	%	±%
Liberal Democrats	Janet Lindsay Repton	685		
Liberal Democrats	Sophie Farkas	677		
Conservative	David James Blagden	315		
Conservative	Simon John Birkett	302		
Green	John Richard Pearce	181		
Majority		362		
Turnout			38.55	
Liberal Democrats hold		Swing		
Liberal Democrats hold		Swing		

=== Bradford-on-Avon South ===
Bradford-on-Avon South (2)
Party	Candidate	Votes	%	±%
Liberal Democrats	Minna Winifred Gillham	955		
Liberal Democrats	Frances Lewis	819		
Conservative	Baldev Singh Jathoul	411		
Green	Vivien Jennifer Talbot	313		
Majority		408		
Turnout			41.03	
Liberal Democrats hold		Swing		
Liberal Democrats hold		Swing		

=== Corsley ===
Corsley
Party	Candidate	Votes	%	±%
Independent	Leonard Frank Osborn	433		
Liberal Democrats	John Vladimir Landell Mills	77		
Majority		356		
Turnout			40.49	
Independent hold		Swing		

=== Dilton Marsh ===
Dilton Marsh
Party	Candidate	Votes	%	±%
Liberal Democrats	Alison Mary Irving	338		
Green	Kevan James Corcoran	158		
Majority		180		
Turnout			35.02	
Liberal Democrats hold		Swing		

=== Ethandune ===
Ethandune
Party	Candidate	Votes	%	±%
Independent	Michael Elwyn Jones			
Majority		Uncontested		
Independent hold		Swing		

=== Holt ===
Holt
Party	Candidate	Votes	%	±%
Liberal Democrats	Anthony John Hunter	448		
Conservative	Gerald Clive Burnan	411		
Green	Lex Hepenstall	62		
Majority		37		
Turnout			41.90	
Liberal Democrats hold		Swing		

=== Manor Vale ===
Manor Vale (2)
Party	Candidate	Votes	%	±%
Conservative	William Campbell Viles	624		
Liberal Democrats	Judith Cunliffe-Jones	597		
Conservative	Marion Joyce Davis	549		
Liberal Democrats	Malcolm George Hewson	417		
Green	Matthew William Griffith	223		
Majority		48		
Turnout			38.91	
Conservative hold		Swing		
Liberal Democrats hold		Swing		

=== Melksham Forest ===
Melksham Forest
Party	Candidate	Votes	%	±%
Labour	Sarah Patricia Cardy	389		
Liberal Democrats	Victoria Christine Scott Landell Mills	91		
Majority		298		
Turnout			31.75	
Labour hold		Swing		

=== Melksham Lambourne ===
Melksham Lambourne
Party	Candidate	Votes	%	±%
Labour	Davina Margaret Griffin	299		
Liberal Democrats	Colin Norman Harrison	160		
Majority		139		
Turnout			28.20	
Labour hold		Swing		

=== Melksham Roundpond ===
Melksham Roundpond
Party	Candidate	Votes	%	±%
Liberal Democrats	Angela Betty Barker			
Majority		Uncontested		
Liberal Democrats hold		Swing		

=== Melksham Town ===
Melksham Town
Party	Candidate	Votes	%	±%
Conservative	Brian Stanley Mudge	376		
Labour	Mavis Elcock	344		
Liberal Democrats	Adrienne Margaret Westbrook	286		
Majority		32		
Turnout			28.96	
Conservative gain from Labour		Swing		

=== Melksham Woodrow ===
Melksham Woodrow
Party	Candidate	Votes	%	±%
Liberal Democrats	Nicholas Shawne Edney Westbrook	345		
Labour	Marcus Aurelius	267		
Majority		78		
Turnout			31.10	
Liberal Democrats hold		Swing		

=== Mid Wylye Valley ===
Mid Wylye Valley
Party	Candidate	Votes	%	±%
Independent	Christopher Newbury	295		
Conservative	Patrick Andrew Sturges	286		
Liberal Democrats	Simon Rowland Fisher	52		
Majority		9		
Turnout			48.58	
Independent hold		Swing		

=== Paxcroft ===
Paxcroft
Party	Candidate	Votes	%	±%
Liberal Democrats	Trevor William Carbin	634		
Conservative	June Edith Dallimore	342		
Majority		292		
Turnout			38.32	
Liberal Democrats hold		Swing		

=== Shearwater ===
Shearwater
Party	Candidate	Votes	%	±%
Conservative	Michael Burke Mounde	242		
Liberal Democrats	Gregory James Doyle	225		
Majority		17		
Turnout			39.25	
Conservative gain from Liberal Democrats		Swing		

=== Summerham ===
Summerham
Party	Candidate	Votes	%	±%
Liberal Democrats	Adrian George Fox	701		
Conservative	Roy Leslie Sloper	357		
Majority		344		
Turnout			49.77	
Liberal Democrats hold		Swing		

=== Trowbridge Adcroft ===
Trowbridge Adcroft (2)
Party	Candidate	Votes	%	±%
Liberal Democrats	Nicholas Blakemore	346		
Liberal Democrats	Thomas Raymond James	324		
Conservative	James Martin Haddon Alsop	145		
Green	Richard Douglas Mills	102		
Majority		179		
Turnout			23.32	
Liberal Democrats hold		Swing		
Liberal Democrats hold		Swing		

=== Trowbridge College ===
Trowbridge College (2)
Party	Candidate	Votes	%	±%
Liberal Democrats	Grace Hill	496		
Liberal Democrats	Jeffrey Bryan Osborn	382		
Conservative	James Oliver Powell	245		
Conservative	Darren James Earley	242		
Labour	Hazel Marie Sargent	223		
Green	Nigel John Pratt	99		
Majority		137		
Turnout			25.63	
Liberal Democrats hold		Swing		
Liberal Democrats hold		Swing		

=== Trowbridge Drynham ===
Trowbridge Drynham (2)
Party	Candidate	Votes	%	±%
Liberal Democrats	Marcus Alexander Francis	480		
Conservative	Graham David Payne	407		
Liberal Democrats	Helen Bridget Osborn	368		
Conservative	Anthony John Christopher Pearce	297		
Green	Jean Ham	90		
Majority		39		
Turnout			23.28	
Liberal Democrats hold		Swing		
Conservative hold		Swing		

=== Trowbridge John of Gaunt ===
Trowbridge John of Gaunt (2)
Party	Candidate	Votes	%	±%
Liberal Democrats	Robert John Brice	503		
Liberal Democrats	Joan Mary Stacey	498		
Conservative	John Roland Wallace Knight	364		
Conservative	Richard Adrian Knight	356		
Labour	Andrew John Hungerford	248		
Green	David Entwistle	155		
Majority		134		
Turnout			25.12	
Liberal Democrats hold		Swing		
Liberal Democrats hold		Swing		

=== Trowbridge Park ===
Trowbridge Park (2)
Party	Candidate	Votes	%	±%
Liberal Democrats	Stephen John Oldrieve	492		
Conservative	Peter Fuller	492		
Liberal Democrats	Andrew James Bryant	491		
Conservative	Anthony Ivan Moore	440		
Green	Robert Gledhill	191		
Majority		1		
Turnout			29.10	
Liberal Democrats hold		Swing		
Conservative gain from Liberal Democrats		Swing		

=== Warminster East ===
Warminster East (3)
Party	Candidate	Votes	%	±%
Conservative	Christopher March	956		
Conservative	Andrew Davis	919		
Conservative	Kay Carol Whatley-Gibbs	902		
Liberal Democrats	Mark Houghton Brown	569		
Liberal Democrats	Edward Raymond Beaty	569		
Liberal Democrats	Peter John Williams	507		
Green	Roland Peter Noyce	282		
Majority		333		
Turnout			32.80	
Conservative hold		Swing		
Conservative hold		Swing		
Conservative hold		Swing		

=== Warminster West ===
Warminster West (3)
Party	Candidate	Votes	%	±%
Liberal Democrats	John Edward Syme	976		
Liberal Democrats	Catherine Jane Day	915		
Liberal Democrats	David John Lovell	882		
Conservative	Martin John Baker	829		
Conservative	Anthony Robert Nixon Jackson	817		
Conservative	Anthony James Nicklin	568		
Majority		53		
Turnout			28.82	
Liberal Democrats hold		Swing		
Liberal Democrats hold		Swing		
Liberal Democrats hold		Swing		

=== Weavers ===
Weavers (2)
Party	Candidate	Votes	%	±%
Independent	Anthony Guy Phillips	851		
Liberal Democrats	Horace John Prickett	604		
Conservative	Aubrey Harold Austin	551		
Liberal Democrats	Richard George Crofts	343		
Green	Kathryn Jennifer Toyne	176		
Majority		53		
Turnout			39.76	
Independent hold		Swing		
Liberal Democrats gain from Conservative		Swing		

=== Westbrook ===
Westbrook
Party	Candidate	Votes	%	±%
Liberal Democrats	Terrence Peter Chivers			
Majority		Uncontested		
Liberal Democrats hold		Swing		

=== Westbury with Storridge ===
Westbury with Storridge (3)
Party	Candidate	Votes	%	±%
Liberal Democrats	John David Annetts	1,237		
Liberal Democrats	Gordon Ian King	1,139		
Conservative	Marion Clegg	875		
Labour	Elisha Manasseh	787		
Liberal Democrats	Sally Scott-White	786		
Conservative	David George Lux	655		
Conservative	William Scott Shiel Braid	636		
Independent	William Thomas Miller	437		
Green	James Oliver Toyne	258		
Majority		88		
Turnout			34.51	
Liberal Democrats hold		Swing		
Liberal Democrats hold		Swing		
Conservative gain from Liberal Democrats		Swing		

=== Wylye Valley ===
Wylye Valley
Party	Candidate	Votes	%	±%
Conservative	William Daniel Hurd	269		
Liberal Democrats	Carleton Arden Hulme Beaman	134		
Independent	Francis Morland	133		
Majority		135		
Turnout			42.06	
Conservative hold		Swing		
