= 1999 European Parliament election in Veneto =

The European Parliament election of 1999 took place on 13 June 1999.

Forza Italia was by far the largest party in Veneto with 26.0%, while the Bonino List came surprisingly second with 11.9% (3.2% over the national average).

== Results ==
Party	votes	votes (%)
Forza Italia	679,418	26.0
Bonino List	312,355	11.9
Democrats of the Left	290,392	11.1
Lega Nord	280,328	10.7
The Democrats	225,499	8.6
Segni Pact – National Alliance	216,857	8.3
United Christian Democrats	94,715	3.6
Liga Veneta Repubblica*	92,199	3.5
Italian People's Party	90,092	3.4
Communist Refoundation Party	72,607	2.8
Federation of the Greens	50,560	1.9
Christian Democratic Centre	46,820	1.8
Party of Italian Communists	32,207	1.2
Italian Democratic Socialists	31,180	1.2
Tricolour Flame	30,149	1.2
Pensioners' Party	26,981	1.0
Others	44,035	1.7
Total	2,616,315	100.0

* = In alliance with Lega per l'Autonomia – Alleanza Lombarda, the Sardinian Action Party and Union for South Tyrol at the national level.
Source: Regional Council of Veneto
