= 1999 South Gloucestershire Council election =

1999 UK local government election

The 1999 South Gloucestershire Council election took place on 6 May 1999 to elect members of South Gloucestershire unitary authority in England. All 70 seats in the council were up for election and the Liberal Democrats gained overall control of the council from no overall control.

== Election result ==
South Gloucestershire Council election, 1999
Party	Seats	Gains	Losses	Net gain/loss	Seats %	Votes %	Votes	+/−
Liberal Democrats	37	7	0	+7	52.9	35.5	48,570	
Labour	25	0	5	−5	35.7	35.4	48,313	
Conservative	8	0	0	±0	11.4	27.9	38,173	
Independent	0	0	1	−1	0	1.1	1,452	
Green	0	0	0	±0	0	0.1	158	

== Ward results ==
In wards that are represented by more than one councillor, electors were given more than one vote each, hence the voter turnout may not match the number of votes cast.

Almondsbury (1 seat)
Party	Candidate	Votes	%	±%
Conservative	Sheila Cook	741	56.1	
Liberal Democrats	Jonathan Maytham	490	37.1	
Labour	Patrick Lillis	89	6.7	
Turnout		1,320		

Alveston (1 seat)
Party	Candidate	Votes	%	±%
Liberal Democrats	Gary Fox	708	64.8	
Conservative	Leona Jackson	385	35.2	
Turnout		1,093		

Bitton (1 seat)
Party	Candidate	Votes	%	±%
Liberal Democrats	Michael Thomas	487	42.0	
Conservative	Roger Kinsman	428	36.9	
Labour	Patricia Apps	245	21.1	
Turnout		1,160		

Boyd Valley (2 seats)
Party	Candidate	Votes	%	±%
Liberal Democrats	Marilyn Palmer	903	18.6	
Conservative	Sandra Grant	901	18.6	
Labour	Andrew Witts	852	17.5	
Conservative	Christopher White	812	16.7	
Liberal Democrats	Omar Beg	739	15.2	
Labour	Jonathan Easterbrook	649	13.4	
Turnout		2,428		

Bradley Stoke Baileys Court (1 seat)
Party	Candidate	Votes	%	±%
Liberal Democrats	Michael Collins	430	58.0	
Conservative	Maria Edey	184	24.8	
Labour	Eric Gordon	127	17.1	
Turnout		741		

Bradley Stoke Bowsland (2 seats)
Party	Candidate	Votes	%	±%
Liberal Democrats	Julian Barge	788	34.1	
Liberal Democrats	Jonathon Williams	710	30.7	
Conservative	Anthony Low	223	9.6	
Conservative	Rosemary Low	219	9.5	
Labour	Diane Hutchinson	203	8.8	
Labour	Patricia Putterill	169	7.3	
Turnout		1,156		

Bradley Stoke Sherbourne (2 seats)
Party	Candidate	Votes	%	±%
Liberal Democrats	Diane Adams	343	33.6	
Liberal Democrats	Arthur Adams	328	32.1	
Conservative	Justin Howells	196	19.2	
Labour	Nigel Peaple	154	15.1	
Turnout		510		

Charfield (1 seat)
Party	Candidate	Votes	%	±%
Liberal Democrats	Edgar Gadsby	608	71.4	
Conservative	John Buxton	244	28.6	
Turnout		852		

Chipping Sobury (2 seats)
Party	Candidate	Votes	%	±%
Liberal Democrats	Linda Boon	1,053	22.6	
Liberal Democrats	Sheila Mead	1,038	22.3	
Conservative	Paul Tily	991	21.3	
Conservative	Martyn Radnedge	818	17.5	
Independent	Gerald Philp	372	8.0	
Labour	Sheena Lomas	210	4.5	
Labour	Frederick Simpson	179	3.8	
Turnout		2,330		

Cotswold Edge (1 seat)
Party	Candidate	Votes	%	±%
Liberal Democrats	Susan Hope	721	52.2	
Conservative	Roland Starling	601	43.5	
Labour	Brian Edge	59	4.3	
Turnout		1,381		

Dodington (2 seats)
Party	Candidate	Votes	%	±%
Liberal Democrats	Kay Crowe	790	32.1	
Liberal Democrats	Anthony Davis	741	30.1	
Labour	Roland Clements	254	10.3	
Conservative	Adam Loveridge	239	9.7	
Labour	Charles Pfeil	225	9.2	
Conservative	David Loveridge	212	8.6	
Turnout		1,231		

Downend (3 seats)
Party	Candidate	Votes	%	±%
Conservative	Arthur Cullimore	1,542	16.1	
Conservative	David Upjohn	1,483	15.5	
Conservative	Ian Smith	1,479	15.5	
Labour	Moyra Evans	1,228	12.8	
Labour	Julie Snelling	1,209	12.6	
Labour	Jonathan Seagrave	1,161	12.1	
Liberal Democrats	Lindsey Brady	528	5.5	
Liberal Democrats	Alan Knight	486	5.1	
Liberal Democrats	Kathleen Wrigley	444	4.8	
Turnout		4,780		

Filton (3 seats)
Party	Candidate	Votes	%	±%
Labour	Roger Hutchinson	1,343	20.3	
Labour	Terance Pomroy	1,260	19.1	
Labour	Stanley Sim	1,257	19.0	
Conservative	Brian Freeguard	657	10.0	
Conservative	Anthony Bryant	633	9.6	
Conservative	Ann Kenyon	592	9.0	
Liberal Democrats	Amanda Hicks	298	4.5	
Liberal Democrats	Donald Pearce	287	4.3	
Liberal Democrats	Garnett Shaw	278	4.2	
Turnout		2,202		

Frampton Cotterell (2 seats)
Party	Candidate	Votes	%	±%
Liberal Democrats	Patricia Hockey	1,261	31.8	
Liberal Democrats	Winston Hockey	1,176	29.6	
Conservative	Dennis Manfield	488	12.3	
Conservative	Dennis Broome	475	11.9	
Labour	George Keel	308	7.8	
Labour	Terance Trollope	260	6.6	
Turnout		1,984		

Hanham (3 seats)
Party	Candidate	Votes	%	±%
Labour	Leslie Bishop	1,188	14.0	
Labour	Colin Cradock	1,182	13.9	
Labour	Norma Cradock	1,162	13.7	
Conservative	Keith Hobbs	913	10.8	
Conservative	John Lewis	891	10.5	
Conservative	Meryl Morgan	847	10.0	
Liberal Democrats	Reginald Payne	801	9.5	
Liberal Democrats	Terence Bridgeman	787	9.3	
Liberal Democrats	Jeffrey Dando	700	8.3	
Turnout		2,824		

Kings Chase (3 seats)
Party	Candidate	Votes	%	±%
Labour	Deanna Macrae	1,436	24.2	
Labour	Terence Walker	1,420	24.0	
Labour	James Macrae	1,378	23.2	
Conservative	Heather Goddard	431	7.3	
Conservative	Cyril Haddy	389	6.6	
Liberal Democrats	Edward Cregg	350	5.9	
Liberal Democrats	James Corrigan	288	4.9	
Liberal Democrats	Michael Hilborne	232	3.9	
Turnout		1,975		

Ladden Brook (1 seat)
Party	Candidate	Votes	%	±%
Liberal Democrats	Jean Capstick	565	51.4	
Conservative	Lance Free	309	28.1	
Labour	Elaine McCarthy	226	20.5	
Turnout		1,100		

Longwell Green (2 seats)
Party	Candidate	Votes	%	±%
Conservative	John Calway	1,164	26.8	
Conservative	Michael Armstrong	1,110	25.6	
Labour	Brenda Bishop	565	13.0	
Liberal Democrats	Rosamund Vincent	526	12.1	
Labour	Roland Wright	522	12.0	
Liberal Democrats	Michael Rawlings	457	10.5	
Turnout		2,172		

Oldland Common (2 seats)
Party	Candidate	Votes	%	±%
Liberal Democrats	Alan Greenfield	1,229	33.1	
Liberal Democrats	Marc Scawen	1,028	27.7	
Labour	Ann Coales	615	16.6	
Labour	Malcolm Bridge	607	16.3	
Conservative	Jonathan Calway	235	6.3	
Turnout		1,857		

Parkwall (2 seats)
Party	Candidate	Votes	%	±%
Labour	Arnold Lovell	972	29.5	
Labour	June Lovell	969	29.4	
Conservative	David Porter	376	11.4	
Conservative	John Scammell	358	10.9	
Liberal Democrats	Maureen Golding	319	9.7	
Liberal Democrats	Julain Lord	302	9.2	
Turnout		1,648		

Patchway (3 seats)
Party	Candidate	Votes	%	±%
Labour	Lewis Gray	934		
Liberal Democrats	Kenneth Dando	864		
Labour	Evelyn Orpen	786		
Labour	Muriel Richardson	702		
Liberal Democrats	Kenneth Graupner	676		
Independent	Charles Horton	639		
Liberal Democrats	Majorie Graupner	626		
Independent	Jean Horton	441		
Conservative	Lesley Kent	290		
Turnout		5,958		

Pilning and Severn Beach (1 seat)
Party	Candidate	Votes	%	±%
Liberal Democrats	Peter Tyzack	514	66.1	
Conservative	Mark Roberts	264	33.9	
Turnout		778		

Rodway (3 seats)
Party	Candidate	Votes	%	±%
Labour	Casper Springer	1,546		
Labour	Mark Dean	1,544		
Labour	Donald Brownlie	1,518		
Conservative	Martin Bisp	720		
Conservative	Colin Hunt	702		
Conservative	Peter Williams	702		
Liberal Democrats	Elizabeth Wadner	333		
Liberal Democrats	John Martin	312		
Liberal Democrats	Joan Reeves	311		
Turnout		7,688		

Severn (1 seat)
Party	Candidate	Votes	%	±%
Liberal Democrats	Anthony Williams	884	55.6	
Conservative	Sheila Bedford	707	44.4	
Turnout		1,591		

Siston (3 seats)
Party	Candidate	Votes	%	±%
Liberal Democrats	Josephine Byron	1,078		
Liberal Democrats	Mark Poarch	1,044		
Labour	Olive Maggs	1,007		
Liberal Democrats	Christopher Martyn	994		
Labour	John Kenvin	989		
Labour	Patricia Rooney	951		
Conservative	John Burns	939		
Conservative	Valerie Lee	901		
Conservative	Anthony Fry	807		
Turnout		8,710		

Staple Hill (2 seats)
Party	Candidate	Votes	%	±%
Labour	Shirley Potts	1,394		
Labour	Geoffrey King	1,301		
Conservative	Roger Long	373		
Conservative	Robert Lavis	324		
Liberal Democrats	Derek Nethercote	176		
Liberal Democrats	Ernest Verso	166		
Turnout		3,734		

Stoke Gifford (3 seats)
Party	Candidate	Votes	%	±%
Labour	Michael Gallivan	991		
Labour	Nicholas Sloper	970		
Labour	John Wakeham	926		
Conservative	Janet Platten	659		
Liberal Democrats	Barry Adams	656		
Conservative	Michael Platten	638		
Liberal Democrats	Richard Parkinson	347		
Liberal Democrats	Alan Monaghan	337		
Turnout		5,524		

Thornbury North (2 seats)
Party	Candidate	Votes	%	±%
Liberal Democrats	Clare Fardell	839		
Liberal Democrats	Neil Halsall	731		
Conservative	Pamela Rickards	619		
Conservative	Janet Buxton	598		
Labour	William Gill	335		
Labour	Brian Watkins	233		
Green	Alan Pinder	158		
Turnout		3,513		

Thornbury South (2 seats)
Party	Candidate	Votes	%	±%
Liberal Democrats	Margaret Tyrrell	1,355		
Liberal Democrats	Jeanette Ward	1,185		
Labour	Terence Press	663		
Conservative	Heather Langston	477		
Conservative	Douglas Daniels	453		
Labour	Gary Pepworth	421		
Turnout		4,554		

Westerleigh (1 seat)
Party	Candidate	Votes	%	±%
Liberal Democrats	Alan Bracey	798	67.2	
Conservative	Linda Winter	310	26.1	
Labour	Michael Bell	80	6.7	
Turnout		1,188		

Winterbourne (3 seats)
Party	Candidate	Votes	%	±%
Liberal Democrats	Peter Heaney	1,519		
Liberal Democrats	Andrew Cox	1,443		
Conservative	Allan Higgs	1,278		
Conservative	Roger Northam	1,262		
Liberal Democrats	Robert Reed	1,262		
Conservative	Michael May	1,172		
Labour	John Lloyd	376		
Labour	Hazel Becker	368		
Labour	Susan Bean	344		
Turnout		9,024		

Woodstock (3 seats)
Party	Candidate	Votes	%	±%
Labour	Raymond Holmes	1,540		
Labour	Sidney Hunt	1,500		
Labour	Roger Coales	1,474		
Conservative	Derrick Hooper	563		
Conservative	Wendy Keats	534		
Liberal Democrats	Valerie Bridgeman	490		
Liberal Democrats	Julie Greenfield	413		
Liberal Democrats	Susan Rickerby	412		
Turnout		6,926		

Yale Central (2 seats)
Party	Candidate	Votes	%	±%
Liberal Democrats	Susan Walker	916		
Liberal Democrats	Ruth Davis	855		
Labour	Michael Chivers	301		
Labour	John Sims	271		
Conservative	Sonia Johnson	249		
Conservative	Eugenia Caple	243		
Turnout		2,835		

Yale North (2 seats)
Party	Candidate	Votes	%	±%
Liberal Democrats	Alan Lawrance	1,055		
Liberal Democrats	Michael Robbins	1,028		
Labour	Edwin Adams	255		
Conservative	Ann Burcher	247		
Conservative	Philip Scott	243		
Labour	Philip Sutton	233		
Turnout		3,061		

Yale West (2 seats)
Party	Candidate	Votes	%	±%
Liberal Democrats	William Hargreaves	872		
Liberal Democrats	Michael Drew	860		
Labour	Robert McGurk	369		
Labour	Robert Lomas	308		
Conservative	Francis Coombes	179		
Conservative	Alan Taylor	154		
Turnout		2,742		
