= 1999 Tajik constitutional referendum =

Constitutional referendum in Tajikistan

- 26 September 1999

Results
Choice	Votes	%
Yes	1,860,804	75.32%
No	609,787	24.68%
Valid votes	2,470,591	95.32%
Invalid or blank votes	121,314	4.68%
Total votes	2,591,905	100.00%
Registered voters/turnout	2,800,947	92.54%

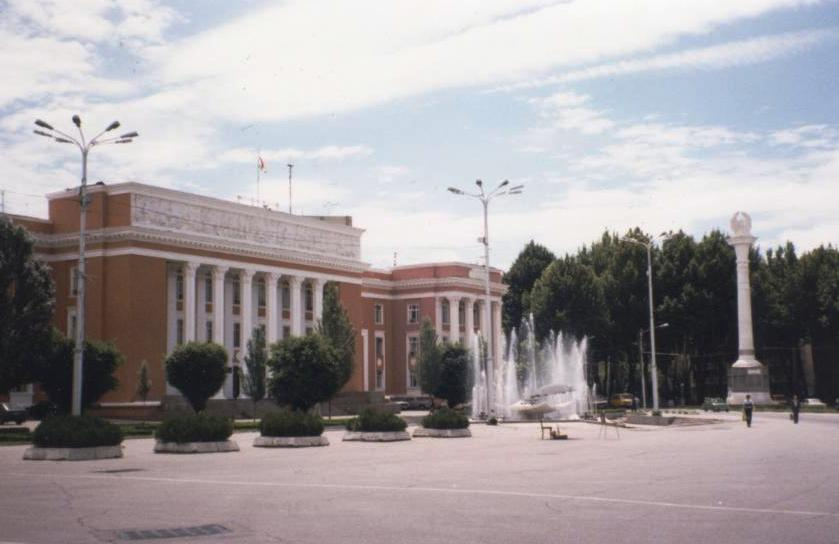
The Tajikistan parliament building in 1999.

A constitutional referendum was held in Tajikistan on 26 September 1999. The changes included legalising religious political parties, introducing a bicameral parliament, and lengthening the president's term from five to seven years. They were approved by 75% of voters, with a turnout of 93%.

The referendum was marred by irregularities.

== Results ==
Choice	Votes	%
For	1,860,804	75.32
Against	609,787	24.68
Total	2,470,591	100.00
Valid votes	2,470,591	95.32
Invalid/blank votes	121,314	4.68
Total votes	2,591,905	100.00
Registered voters/turnout	2,800,947	92.54
Source: Nohlen et al.
