= 1999 Rochdale Metropolitan Borough Council election =

1999 UK local government election

Elections to Rochdale Council were held on 6 May 1999. One third of the council was up for election and the Labour Party kept overall control of the council.

After the election, the composition of the council was:

- Labour 35
- Liberal Democrat 19
- Conservative 6

== Election result ==
Rochdale local election result 1999
Party	Seats	Gains	Losses	Net gain/loss	Seats %	Votes %	Votes	+/−
Labour	11			-1	57.9			
Liberal Democrats	6			+1	31.6			
Conservative	2			0	10.5			
