= 1999 Purbeck District Council election =

1999 UK local government election

Elections to Purbeck District Council were held on 6 May 1999. The whole council was up for election with boundary changes since the last election in 1998 increasing the number of seats by 2. The Conservative party gained overall control of the council from no overall control.

== Election result ==
Purbeck local election result 1999
Party	Seats	Gains	Losses	Net gain/loss	Seats %	Votes %	Votes	+/−
Conservative	13			+7	54.2			
Liberal Democrats	5			-2	20.8			
Independent	5			-1	20.8			
Labour	1			-2	4.2			
