= 1999 Dacorum Borough Council election =

1999 UK local government election

- 4 May 1999

All 52 seats to Dacorum Borough Council 27 seats needed for a majority

	First party	Second party
Party	Conservative	Labour
Seats won	26	20
Seat change	▲7	▼13
Popular vote	31,879	27,199
Percentage	44.2%	37.7%
Swing	▲12.7%	▼9.0%
	Third party	Fourth party
Party	Liberal Democrats	Independent
Seats won	6	0
Seat change	▲2	▼2
Popular vote	10,701	1,778
Percentage	14.8%	2.5%
Swing	▼4.3%	▲1.0%
- Winner of each seat at the 1999 Dacorum Borough Council election.
Control before election
Labour
Control after election
No overall control

The 1999 Dacorum Borough Council election took place on 6 May 1999 to elect members to Dacorum Borough Council in Hertfordshire, England. This was on the same day as other local elections.

The whole council was up for election, with new boundary changes since the previous election and a reduction in overall councillors from 58 to 52. The Conservative Party made significant gains, winning exactly half of the total seats, and pushing the council into no overall control.

The election in Highfield & St Pauls ward was delayed until 3 June 1999 after the death of one of the original Conservative candidates.

== Summary ==
=== Election result ===
1999 Dacorum Borough Council election
Party	Candidates	Seats	Gains	Losses	Net gain/loss	Seats %	Votes %	Votes	+/−
Conservative	52	26	7	0	▲7	50.0	44.2	31,879	+12.7
Labour	52	20	0	7	▼13	38.5	37.7	27,199	–9.0
Liberal Democrats	34	6	2	0	▲2	11.5	14.8	10,701	–4.3
Independent	9	0	0	2	▼2	0.0	2.5	1,778	+1.0
Green	4	0	0	0	Steady	0.0	0.8	553	+0.1
Natural Law	1	0	0	0	Steady	0.0	<0.1	23	–0.1

== Ward results ==
Incumbent councillors standing for re-election are marked with an asterisk (*). Changes in seats do not take into account by-elections or defections.

=== Adeyfield East ===
Adeyfield East (2 seats)
Party	Candidate	Votes	%	±%
Labour	Michael Pesch*	741	54.5	–2.3
Labour	Raymond Haverson*	736	54.1	+1.0
Conservative	Peter Channell	597	43.9	+11.1
Conservative	Eliot Tyler-Waddington	533	39.2	+6.6
Turnout		~1,360	31.6	–17.0
Registered electors		4,305		
Labour hold				
Labour hold				

=== Adeyfield West ===
Adeyfield West (2 seats)
Party	Candidate	Votes	%	±%
Labour	Keith White	610	51.4	–17.1
Labour	Navaratnam Singam*	609	51.3	–13.5
Conservative	Michael Barry	408	34.4	+14.8
Conservative	Hugh Scott	403	34.0	+14.9
Turnout		~1,186	30.9	–10.1
Registered electors		3,838		
Labour hold				
Labour hold				

=== Aldbury & Wigginton ===
Aldbury & Wigginton
Party	Candidate	Votes	%	±%
Conservative	Tobias Ellwood	382	59.5	+12.1
Liberal Democrats	Michael James	139	21.7	+0.6
Labour	Hugh Wilson	121	18.8	–12.7
Majority		243	37.8	+21.9
Turnout		642	34.7	–4.3
Registered electors		1,888		
Conservative hold		Swing	▲5.8	

=== Apsley ===
Apsley
Party	Candidate	Votes	%
Conservative	Jennifer Beesley	563	66.8
Labour	Rosemary Eastwood	280	33.2
Majority		283	33.6
Turnout		843	37.8
Registered electors		2,249	
Conservative win (new seat)			

=== Ashridge ===
Ashridge
Party	Candidate	Votes	%	±%
Conservative	Frank Seely*	771	78.3	+15.1
Labour	William Glennon	214	21.7	–0.5
Majority		557	56.6	N/A
Turnout		985	47.5	+2.5
Registered electors		2,163		
Conservative hold		Swing	▲7.8	

=== Bennetts End ===
Bennetts End (2 seats)
Party	Candidate	Votes	%	±%
Labour	Gary Cook*	856	63.7	–5.9
Labour	Paul Eastwood	821	61.1	–7.1
Conservative	Robert Fisher	347	25.8	+6.4
Conservative	Arthur Craigen	344	25.6	+6.5
Liberal Democrats	Colin Roe	140	10.4	+2.4
Liberal Democrats	Roger Wilson	113	8.4	+0.6
Turnout		~1,344	31.3	–9.6
Registered electors		4,297		
Labour hold				
Labour hold				

=== Berkhamsted Castle ===
Berkhamsted Castle (2 seats)
Party	Candidate	Votes	%
Conservative	Kenneth Coleman*	577	36.2
Conservative	Peter Ginger*	542	34.0
Liberal Democrats	Betty Patterson	502	31.5
Liberal Democrats	Geraldine Corry	490	30.7
Independent	Ian Johnston	342	21.4
Independent	Edward Dyer	278	17.4
Labour	David Franks	173	10.8
Labour	Nicholas Shacklock	172	10.8
Turnout		~1,595	36.5
Registered electors		4,365	
Conservative win (new seat)			
Conservative win (new seat)			

=== Berkhamsted East ===
Berkhamsted East (2 seats)
Party	Candidate	Votes	%	±%
Liberal Democrats	Jonathan Lythgoe*	629	40.1	+12.2
Liberal Democrats	Paul Gibbs	610	38.9	+12.5
Conservative	Philip Davis	497	31.7	+4.3
Conservative	John Sewell	477	30.4	+3.1
Labour	Geoffrey Bellamy	287	18.3	–8.5
Labour	Martin Bromberg	239	15.2	–9.5
Independent	Nicholas Cutting*	179	11.4	–22.0
Green	David Jones	77	4.9	N/A
Turnout		~1,570	37.5	–9.5
Registered electors		4,188		
Liberal Democrats hold				
Liberal Democrats gain from Independent				

=== Berkhamsted West ===
Berkhamsted West (2 seats)
Party	Candidate	Votes	%	±%
Liberal Democrats	Susan Sharpe*	604	42.3	–5.2
Liberal Democrats	John Brooks*	581	40.7	–5.0
Conservative	Ian Reay	572	40.0	+18.1
Conservative	Christopher Green	566	39.6	+19.0
Labour	John Gilbert	203	14.2	–11.3
Labour	David Franks	182	12.7	–11.5
Turnout		~1,429	34.3	–12.7
Registered electors		4,167		
Liberal Democrats hold				
Liberal Democrats hold				

=== Bovingdon, Flaunden & Chipperfield ===
Bovingdon, Flaunden & Chipperfield (3 seats)
Party	Candidate	Votes	%
Conservative	Peter Beale	1,315	60.3
Conservative	Brian O'Sullivan	1,277	58.6
Conservative	Andrew Janes	1,267	58.1
Liberal Democrats	David Griffiths	471	21.6
Liberal Democrats	Christopher Richardson	418	19.2
Labour	Simon Cerins	373	17.1
Labour	Michael Harradine*	361	16.6
Labour	Andrew Olive	347	15.9
Liberal Democrats	Graham Stevens	345	15.8
Turnout		~2,181	33.8
Registered electors		6,452	
Conservative win (new seat)			
Conservative win (new seat)			
Conservative win (new seat)			

=== Boxmoor ===
Boxmoor (2 seats)
Party	Candidate	Votes	%	±%
Conservative	John Marshall	1,015	51.3	+11.8
Conservative	Andrew Fairburn	950	48.0	+8.5
Labour	Martin Hutchison*	940	47.5	+6.1
Labour	Alan Dennison*	921	46.6	+6.2
Turnout		~1,978	45.2	–1.8
Registered electors		4,376		
Conservative gain from Labour				
Conservative gain from Labour				

=== Chaulden & Shrubhill ===
Chaulden & Shrubhill (2 seats)
Party	Candidate	Votes	%
Labour	Alan Johnsen*	857	57.2
Labour	Richard Widger	824	55.0
Conservative	Andrew Richardson	432	28.9
Conservative	Brian Griffiths	428	28.6
Independent	William Killen*	267	17.8
Turnout		~1,497	37.8
Registered electors		3,960	
Labour win (new seat)			
Labour win (new seat)			

=== Corner Hall ===
Corner Hall (2 seats)
Party	Candidate	Votes	%
Labour	David Bennett*	732	51.5
Labour	Andrew Inchley	657	46.3
Conservative	John Hanson	481	33.9
Conservative	Christopher Cadman	469	33.0
Liberal Democrats	Jonathan Blackman	145	10.2
Liberal Democrats	Michael Waugh	128	9.0
Independent	Stephen Harrison	54	3.8
Turnout		~1,420	31.6
Registered electors		4,495	
Labour win (new seat)			
Labour win (new seat)			

=== Gadebridge ===
Gadebridge (2 seats)
Party	Candidate	Votes	%	±%
Labour	Michael Flint*	780	58.0	–21.0
Labour	Margaret Coxage	677	50.3	–21.4
Independent	Michael Young*	288	21.4	N/A
Conservative	John Reid	284	21.1	+3.3
Conservative	Laurence Pouyanne	281	20.9	+3.5
Independent	Martin Presland*	199	14.8	N/A
Natural Law	David Harding	23	1.7	N/A
Turnout		~1,345	34.4	–7.5
Registered electors		3,910		
Labour hold				
Labour hold				

=== Grove Hill ===
Grove Hill (3 seats)
Party	Candidate	Votes	%	±%
Labour	Andrew Fisher*	766	59.1	–7.3
Labour	Michael Maloney*	710	54.7	–8.5
Labour	Robert Walsh	681	52.5	–5.0
Conservative	John Higgs	331	25.5	+7.7
Conservative	Kevin Reid	326	25.1	+8.6
Conservative	Christopher Peter	324	25.0	+10.2
Liberal Democrats	William Savage	173	13.3	+1.2
Liberal Democrats	Michael Bethune	149	11.5	+1.2
Liberal Democrats	Richard Gooden	147	11.3	+2.3
Turnout		~1,297	22.0	–11.0
Registered electors		5,897		
Labour hold				
Labour hold				
Labour hold				

=== Hemel Hempstead Central ===
Hemel Hempstead Central (2 seats)
Party	Candidate	Votes	%
Conservative	Christopher Appleby*	580	46.7
Conservative	Andrew Williams*	573	46.1
Labour	Robert Hutchison	487	39.2
Labour	Ivan Berkovitch	479	38.6
Liberal Democrats	Jonathan Blackman	132	10.6
Liberal Democrats	Mark Kingsnorth	114	9.2
Turnout		~1,242	32.8
Registered electors		3,787	
Conservative win (new seat)			
Conservative win (new seat)			

=== Highfield & St. Pauls ===
The election in Highfield & St Pauls was delayed until 3 June 1999 due to the death of one of the original Conservative candidates.

Highfield & St. Pauls (3 seats)
Party	Candidate	Votes	%
Labour	Michael Ewing*	845	55.6
Labour	John Dobie	802	52.7
Labour	Andrew Maclaughlin*	734	48.3
Liberal Democrats	Geoffrey Lawrence	415	27.3
Liberal Democrats	Richard Hardy	372	24.5
Liberal Democrats	Roger Pexton	322	21.2
Conservative	Andrew Scott-Lindley	302	19.9
Conservative	John Speight	289	19.0
Conservative	James Mole	277	18.2
Turnout		~1,521	29.0
Registered electors		5,244	
Labour win (new seat)			
Labour win (new seat)			
Labour win (new seat)			

=== Kings Langley ===
Kings Langley (2 seats)
Party	Candidate	Votes	%	±%
Conservative	Andrew Anderson	764	44.7	+16.1
Conservative	Alan McGregor	696	40.7	+17.5
Labour	Karel Sedlacek	647	37.9	–12.5
Labour	Michael Smith	631	36.9	–7.3
Liberal Democrats	Geoffrey Coulter	259	15.2	–2.3
Liberal Democrats	Martin Morton	250	14.6	–2.3
Turnout		~1,709	44.2	–5.8
Registered electors		3,865		
Conservative gain from Labour				
Conservative gain from Labour				

=== Leverstock Green ===
Leverstock Green (3 seats)
Party	Candidate	Votes	%	±%
Conservative	Henry Bassadone*	1,355	56.9	+15.5
Conservative	Leslie Blythe	1,303	54.7	+17.0
Conservative	Michael Griffiths	1,262	53.0	+15.4
Labour	Robert Hebborn	832	35.0	–8.2
Labour	Oliver Warren	774	32.5	–10.2
Labour	Andrew Dickenson	756	31.8	–7.1
Liberal Democrats	Stephen Dalys	173	7.3	–4.8
Liberal Democrats	Mark Roe	162	6.8	–2.8
Liberal Democrats	Richard Cottrell	131	5.5	–3.2
Turnout		~2,380	42.6	–2.8
Registered electors		5,587		
Conservative hold				
Conservative gain from Labour				
Conservative gain from Labour				

=== Nash Mills ===
Nash Mills
Party	Candidate	Votes	%	±%
Conservative	David Smedley	352	48.2	+2.1
Labour	Stephen Fisher	317	43.4	–3.9
Liberal Democrats	Andrew Waugh	62	8.5	+1.9
Majority		35	4.8	N/A
Turnout		731	36.2	–18.8
Registered electors		2,055		
Conservative gain from Labour		Swing	▲3.0	

=== Northchurch ===
Northchurch
Party	Candidate	Votes	%	±%
Conservative	John Dunbavand	537	67.9	+26.6
Liberal Democrats	Brian Batchelor	145	18.3	–12.5
Labour	John Collisson	109	13.8	–14.1
Majority		392	49.6	+39.1
Turnout		791	37.7	–7.3
Registered electors		2,141		
Conservative hold		Swing	▲19.6	

=== Tring Central ===
Tring Central (2 seats)
Party	Candidate	Votes	%	±%
Liberal Democrats	Michael Rance*	639	43.5	+13.0
Liberal Democrats	Nicholas Hollinghurst	581	39.6	+16.6
Conservative	William Barnett	530	36.1	+6.0
Conservative	John Dawson	509	34.7	+5.7
Labour	David Carter	239	16.3	–3.2
Labour	John Maple	215	14.6	–4.0
Green	Christopher Kruger	116	7.9	N/A
Turnout		~1,468	38.5	–6.5
Registered electors		3,813		
Liberal Democrats hold				
Liberal Democrats gain from Independent				

=== Tring East ===
Tring East
Party	Candidate	Votes	%	±%
Conservative	John Jameson*	592	64.6	+4.6
Liberal Democrats	Richard Hollinghurst	209	22.8	+1.5
Labour	Robert Lovelace	116	12.6	–6.1
Majority		383	41.8	+3.1
Turnout		917	43.0	–9.0
Registered electors		2,175		
Conservative hold		Swing	▲1.6	

=== Tring West ===
Tring West (2 seats)
Party	Candidate	Votes	%	±%
Conservative	David Townsend*	769	46.0	+7.8
Conservative	Stephen Mills*	741	44.3	+6.7
Liberal Democrats	Brian Batchelor	505	30.2	+6.8
Liberal Democrats	Peter Elley	446	26.7	N/A
Green	John Hall	258	15.4	–10.4
Labour	David Carroll	249	14.9	–13.3
Labour	Paul Stanton	212	12.7	–11.7
Turnout		~1,671	41.0	–10.0
Registered electors		4,075		
Conservative hold				
Conservative hold				

=== Warners End ===
Warners End (2 seats)
Party	Candidate	Votes	%	±%
Labour	Margaret Coxage*	772	51.6	–2.6
Labour	Richard Dickenson	697	46.6	–6.7
Conservative	Francis Guest	579	38.7	+20.6
Conservative	Andrew Gallagher	538	35.9	+20.7
Green	Andrew Humphrey	102	6.8	N/A
Independent	David Clarke	102	6.8	N/A
Independent	Martin Presland	69	4.6	N/A
Turnout		~1,497	40.0	–4.6
Registered electors		3,742		
Labour hold				
Labour hold				

=== Watling ===
Watling (2 seats)
Party	Candidate	Votes	%
Conservative	Harold Chapman	830	68.9
Conservative	John Taunton	829	68.9
Labour	Geoffrey Edwards	310	25.7
Labour	John Molloy	255	21.1
Turnout		~1,204	29.4
Registered electors		4,095	
Conservative win (new seat)			
Conservative win (new seat)			

=== Woodhall ===
Woodhall (2 seats)
Party	Candidate	Votes	%
Conservative	Charles Denmead	476	48.1
Conservative	Michael Griffiths	437	44.1
Labour	Brian Fisher*	432	43.6
Labour	Stephen Gluck	419	42.3
Turnout		~990	22.9
Registered electors		4,323	
Conservative win (new seat)			
Conservative win (new seat)			
