= 1999 Newcastle-under-Lyme Borough Council election =

1999 UK local government election

Elections to Newcastle-under-Lyme Borough Council were held on 6 May 1999. One third of the council was up for election and the Labour party kept overall control of the council.

After the election, the composition of the council was

- Labour 36
- Liberal Democrat 12
- Conservative 7
- Others 1

== Election result ==
Newcastle-under-Lyme local election result 1999
Party	Seats	Gains	Losses	Net gain/loss	Seats %	Votes %	Votes	+/−
Labour	9			-5	47.4			
Liberal Democrats	6			+3	31.6			
Conservative	4			+2	21.1			
