= 1999 Dutch municipal elections =

← 1998	3 March 1999	2002 →
- Turnout: 52.21 % (▼6.85pp)

Municipal elections were held in the Netherlands on 3 March 1999 in 29 (of the 538) municipalities.

== Background ==
On 1 January 1997, a large municipal reorganization had been implemented in the province of North Brabant. The reorganization elections related to this restructuring had been held on 27 November 1996.

The original bill submitted to the House of Representatives (Tweede Kamer) stipulated that the municipal councils installed on 1 January 1997 would serve a term of 5 years and 4 months, until the municipal elections of 2002, thereby skipping the regular elections of 1998. However, during the parliamentary debate, this term was considered too long. An amendment was added to the bill stipulating that regular municipal elections would be held on 3 March 1999 in the municipalities affected by this reorganization. For practical reasons, this date coincided with the 1999 Provincial Council elections.

== Results ==
=== Seats ===
March 1999 Dutch municipal elections
Municipality	Local lists	CDA	PvdA	VVD	D66	GL	SGP	SP	RPF	GPV	CD	Other
Alphen-Chaam	10 (+1)	2 (−1)		1 (0)								
Bergen op Zoom	15 (+1)	5 (0)	3 (0)	6 (+1)	2 (−1)	2 (0)						
Bergeijk	8 (−1)	6 (0)	1 (+1)	2 (0)								
Bladel	9 (+1)	4 (−1)	2 (−1)	2 (+1)								
Breda	4 (−4)	11 (−1)	6 (+1)	10 (+3)	3 (0)	4 (+1)		1 (0)				
Cranendonck	12 (0)	2 (−2)	3 (+1)	2 (+1)								
Dongen	7 (+1)	4 (0)	2 (+1)	2 (0)	1 (0)			3 (−2)				
Drimmelen	9 (−3)	3 (0)	2 (+1)	5 (+2)	2 (−1)							
Eersel	8 (0)	7 (0)		2 (0)								
Geertruidenberg	6 (−2)	8 (+2)	2 (+1)	2 (0)		1 (−1)						
Gemert-Bakel	11 (+1)	8 (−2)	2 (0)	1 (+1)								
Goirle	12 (+3)	2 (0)	1 (0)	2 (+1)	1 (−1)	3 (+1)						
Halderberge	11 (0)	4 (0)	2 (0)	4 (+1)	0 (−1)							
Heeze-Leende	9 (+2)	4 (−2)	2 (0)	2 (0)								
Heusden	18 (+6)	3 (−1)	2 (0)	3 (+1)	1 (0)							
Hilvarenbeek	9 (0)	3 (−1)	2 (+1)	1 (0)								
Laarbeek	12 (0)	2 (−1)	2 (0)	2 (+1)	0 (0)	1 (0)						
Moerdijk	7 (−2)	6 (0)	3 (−1)	5 (+1)	0 (0)	3 (+2)			1 (0)			
Oirschot	9 (−2)	4 (0)	2 (+1)	2 (+1)								
Oisterwijk	9 (0)	4 (−1)	2 (+1)	4 (+1)	1 (0)	1 (−1)						
Reusel-de Mierden	7 (+1)	5 (0)	2 (0)	1 (−1)								
Roosendaal	12 (−2)	9 (0)	3 (0)	7 (+2)	0 (0)	3 (0)		1 (0)				
Steenbergen	5 (−1)	4 (0)	3 (0)	4 (0)	2 (+1)		1 (0)		1 (0)			
Tilburg	5 (−3)	9 (−1)	7 (+2)	8 (+3)	2 (−1)	5 (+1)		3 (−1)				
Waalwijk	10 (0)	6 (+1)	4 (0)	5 (+2)	0 (−1)	2 (+1)	1 (0)		1 (−1)			
Woensdrecht	8 (−1)	4 (−1)	2 (0)	4 (+2)	1 (0)							
Haaren	8 (−1)	5 (0)		2 (+1)								
Werkendam	6 (−1)	5 (0)	3 (0)	2 (+1)			3 (0)	2 (0)				
Zundert	9 (−1)	5 (0)	1 (+1)	4 (+2)	0 (0)							
Total	265 (−7)	144 (−12)	66 (+10)	97 (+27)	16 (−5)	25 (+4)	5 (±0)	8 (−3)	3 (±0)	2 (−1)	0 (±0)	0 (±0)
Nationwide balance post-election	2725	2417	1852	1850	441	439	194	188	95	63	1	26

=== Turnout ===
Turnout
Municipality	Eligible voters	Ballots cast	Turnout	Spoiled ballots
Alphen-Chaam	7 229	5 787	80.1 %	24
Bergen op Zoom	49 688	25 879	52.1 %	46
Bergeijk	13 632	8 982	65.9 %	13
Bladel	14 495	8 980	62.0 %	55
Breda	125 170	53 349	42.6 %	121
Cranendonck	16 035	9 087	56.7 %	23
Dongen	18 932	10 319	54.5 %	21
Drimmelen	20 473	11 662	57.0 %	7
Eersel	13 540	8 346	61.6 %	26
Geertruidenberg	16 422	8 798	53.6 %	7
Gemert-Bakel	20 600	11 899	57.8 %	48
Goirle	17 006	10 231	60.2 %	9
Halderberge	22 954	13 121	57.2 %	12
Heeze-Leende	11 836	7 915	66.9 %	29
Heusden	31 847	19 890	62.5 %	106
Hilvarenbeek	10 970	7 665	69.9 %	13
Laarbeek	16 407	10 415	63.5 %	54
Moerdijk	28 330	14 668	51.8 %	16
Oirschot	13 335	9 060	67.9 %	56
Oisterwijk	19 425	11 565	59.5 %	9
Reusel-de Mierden	9 161	6 237	68.1 %	13
Roosendaal	57 161	27 341	47.8 %	37
Steenbergen	18 108	9 635	53.2 %	12
Tilburg	148 333	61 603	41.5 %	26
Waalwijk	34 905	18 057	51.7 %	33
Woensdrecht	16 356	8 625	52.7 %	11
Haaren	10 526	6 442	61.2 %	15
Werkendam	19 277	11 885	61.7 %	12
Zundert	15 388	9 356	60.8 %	16
Total	817 541	426 799	52.2 %	870
