= 1999 Tampa mayoral election =

- March 2, 1999
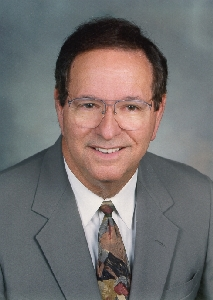
Candidate	Dick A. Greco
Party	Nonpartisan
Popular vote	Unopposed
Percentage	100.00%
Mayor before election
Dick A. Greco
Nonpartisan
Elected mayor
Dick A. Greco
Nonpartisan

The 1999 Tampa mayoral election was held on March 4, 1999. Incumbent Mayor Dick A. Greco ran for re-election to a second consecutive term, and fourth term overall. Greco faced no serious opponents, though political activist Anthony Candela, who had been convicted of several domestic violence offenses, said that he would challenge Greco for re-election. However, no candidates filed to challenge Greco by the filing deadline, and he won re-election entirely unopposed.

== General election ==
=== Candidates ===
- Dick A. Greco, incumbent mayor

==== Declined ====
- Anthony Candela, political activist

=== Results ===
Greco faced no opponents, and did not appear on the ballot.
