= 1999 West Lindsey District Council election =

1999 UK local government election

Elections to West Lindsey District Council in Lincolnshire, England were held on 6 May 1999. The whole council was up for election with boundary changes since the last election in 1998. The council stayed under no overall control.

== Election result ==
West Lindsey local election result 1999
Party	Seats	Gains	Losses	Net gain/loss	Seats %	Votes %	Votes	+/−
Liberal Democrats	16			-2	43.2	46.1	12,933	
Conservative	10			+6	27.0	28.5	7,995	
Independent	8			-2	21.6	11.6	3,246	
Labour	3			-2	8.1	13.8	3,861	

3 Independent and 1 Conservative candidates were unopposed.

== Ward results ==
Bardney
Party	Candidate	Votes	%	±%
Conservative	Ian Fleetwood	484	59.3	
Liberal Democrats	John Turner	332	40.7	
Majority		152	18.6	
Turnout		816	53.1	

Caistor (2)
Party	Candidate	Votes	%	±%
Independent	Alan Caine	unopposed		
Conservative	Derrick Mortimer	unopposed		

Cherry Willingham (2)
Party	Candidate	Votes	%	±%
Conservative	Irmgard Parrott	566		
Independent	George Greenaway	551		
Liberal Democrats	Stuart Miller	339		
Liberal Democrats	Iris Miller	309		
Turnout		1,765	37.7	

Dunholme
Party	Candidate	Votes	%	±%
Liberal Democrats	Stephen Taylor	324	51.3	
Conservative	Susan Rawlins	308	48.7	
Majority		16	2.6	
Turnout		632	40.1	

Fiskerton
Party	Candidate	Votes	%	±%
Independent	Pat Greenaway	269	67.9	
Liberal Democrats	Josephine Clairmont-Brook	127	32.1	
Majority		142	35.8	
Turnout		396	27.5	

Gainsborough East (3)
Party	Candidate	Votes	%	±%
Liberal Democrats	Rodney Rainsforth	630		
Liberal Democrats	Malvyn Starkey	551		
Liberal Democrats	Michael Tinker	549		
Labour	Barry Linda	273		
Labour	Clare Parrott	263		
Turnout		2,266	22.2	

Gainsborough North (3)
Party	Candidate	Votes	%	±%
Liberal Democrats	David Lomas	525		
Labour	Patrick Baldwin	450		
Liberal Democrats	Thomas Brown	399		
Liberal Democrats	Peal Banyard	398		
Labour	Peter Ryan	374		
Labour	Brenda Mills	316		
Conservative	Sally Jupp	258		
Conservative	Josephine Parry	248		
Turnout		2,968	22.0	

Gainsborough South-West (2)
Party	Candidate	Votes	%	±%
Liberal Democrats	Leslie Rainsforth	566		
Liberal Democrats	Trevor Young	529		
Labour	Ian Mills	213		
Labour	Wendy Lawrence	167		
Conservative	Alan Beverley	104		
Conservative	John Otter	95		
Turnout		1,674	26.8	

Hemswell
Party	Candidate	Votes	%	±%
Liberal Democrats	William Gabbott	310	52.9	
Conservative	Stephen Beer	276	47.1	
Majority		34	5.8	
Turnout		586	34.8	

Kelsey
Party	Candidate	Votes	%	±%
Conservative	Charles Strange	541	68.6	
Independent	Ian Watson-Smith	139	17.6	
Labour	Michael Tierney	109	13.8	
Majority		402	51.0	
Turnout		789	42.4	

Lea
Party	Candidate	Votes	%	±%
Independent	Keith Whaley	unopposed		

Market Rasen (2)
Party	Candidate	Votes	%	±%
Liberal Democrats	Neil Taylor	652		
Liberal Democrats	Gary Fenwick	616		
Conservative	Jonathan Gibbons	560		
Independent	Carol Bullen	299		
Turnout		2,127	33.8	

Middle Rasen
Party	Candidate	Votes	%	±%
Liberal Democrats	Adrian Rosser	492	73.1	
Conservative	Owen Bierley	181	26.9	
Majority		311	46.2	
Turnout		673	36.1	

Nettleham (2)
Party	Candidate	Votes	%	±%
Independent	Alfred Frith	821		
Liberal Democrats	Raymond Sellars	705		
Liberal Democrats	Malcolm Leaning	632		
Conservative	Margaret Davidson	523		
Turnout		2,681	43.2	

Saxilby (2)
Party	Candidate	Votes	%	±%
Labour	Catherine Dobson	469		
Conservative	Delyse Silverstone	435		
Labour	Graham Wainwright	389		
Liberal Democrats	Denise Braund	389		
Turnout		1,682	31.9	

Scampton
Party	Candidate	Votes	%	±%
Liberal Democrats	Peter Heath	434	70.6	
Conservative	Martin Macpherson-Lawley	181	29.4	
Majority		253	51.2	
Turnout		615	34.7	

Scotter (2)
Party	Candidate	Votes	%	±%
Conservative	Christopher Underwood-Frost	596		
Conservative	William Parry	587		
Liberal Democrats	Marion Rainsforth	504		
Liberal Democrats	Margaret Gabbott	443		
Turnout		2,130	34.3	

Stow
Party	Candidate	Votes	%	±%
Liberal Democrats	Reginald Shore	458	64.8	
Conservative	Benjamin Green	249	35.2	
Majority		209	29.6	
Turnout		707	42.9	

Sudbrooke
Party	Candidate	Votes	%	±%
Independent	Stuart Curtis	452	61.7	
Liberal Democrats	Catherine Rylatt	280	38.3	
Majority		172	23.4	
Turnout		732	40.0	

Thonock
Party	Candidate	Votes	%	±%
Liberal Democrats	Maurice French	375	65.6	
Conservative	William Morgan	197	34.4	
Majority		178	21.2	
Turnout		572	30.4	

Torksey
Party	Candidate	Votes	%	±%
Independent	Stuart Haywood	unopposed		

Waddingham & Spital
Party	Candidate	Votes	%	±%
Conservative	Edward Green	409	62.2	
Liberal Democrats	Andrew Heathorn	249	37.8	
Majority		160	24.4	
Turnout		658	39.4	

Welton (2)
Party	Candidate	Votes	%	±%
Independent	Malcolm Parish	715		
Conservative	Charles Ireland	586		
Liberal Democrats	Roger Hiscox	568		
Labour	Robin Renshaw	191		
Labour	Sally Scott	150		
Turnout		2,210	38.2	

Wold View
Party	Candidate	Votes	%	±%
Conservative	Bernard Theobald	261	41.4	
Liberal Democrats	John Connolly	248	39.3	
Labour	John Tolliday	122	19.3	
Majority		13	2.1	
Turnout		631	35.4	

Yarborough
Party	Candidate	Votes	%	±%
Labour	John Indian	375	51.7	
Conservative	Jennifer Burt	350	48.3	
Majority		25	3.4	
Turnout		725	37.0	
