= 1999 Rossendale Borough Council election =

1999 UK local government election

Elections to Rossendale Borough Council were held on 6 May 1999. One third of the council was up for election and the Labour Party stayed in overall control of the council.

After the election, the composition of the council was:

- Labour 21
- Conservative 15

== Election result ==
Rossendale local election result 1999
Party	Seats	Gains	Losses	Net gain/loss	Seats %	Votes %	Votes	+/−
Conservative	6	4	0	+4	50.0			
Labour	6	0	4	-4	50.0			
