= 1999 South Tyneside Metropolitan Borough Council election =

1999 UK local government election

The 1999 South Tyneside Metropolitan Borough Council election took place on 6 May 1999 to elect members of South Tyneside Metropolitan Borough Council in Tyne and Wear, England. One third of the council was up for election and the Labour Party kept overall control of the council.

After the election, the composition of the council was:

- Labour 51
- Liberal Democrat 6
- Progressives 3

== Election result ==
The results saw no change with Labour remaining firmly in control with 51 of the 60 seats on the council. In Hebburn Quay ward 3 recounts were required before the sitting Liberal Democrat councillor, Catherine Tolson, was re-elected by 20 votes. Overall turnout in the election was 25.4%.

South Tyneside local election result 1999
Party	Seats	Gains	Losses	Net gain/loss	Seats %	Votes %	Votes	+/−
Labour	17			0	85.0			
Liberal Democrats	2			0	10.0			
Progressives	1			0	5.0			
