= 1999 Louisiana lieutenant gubernatorial election =

- October 23, 1999
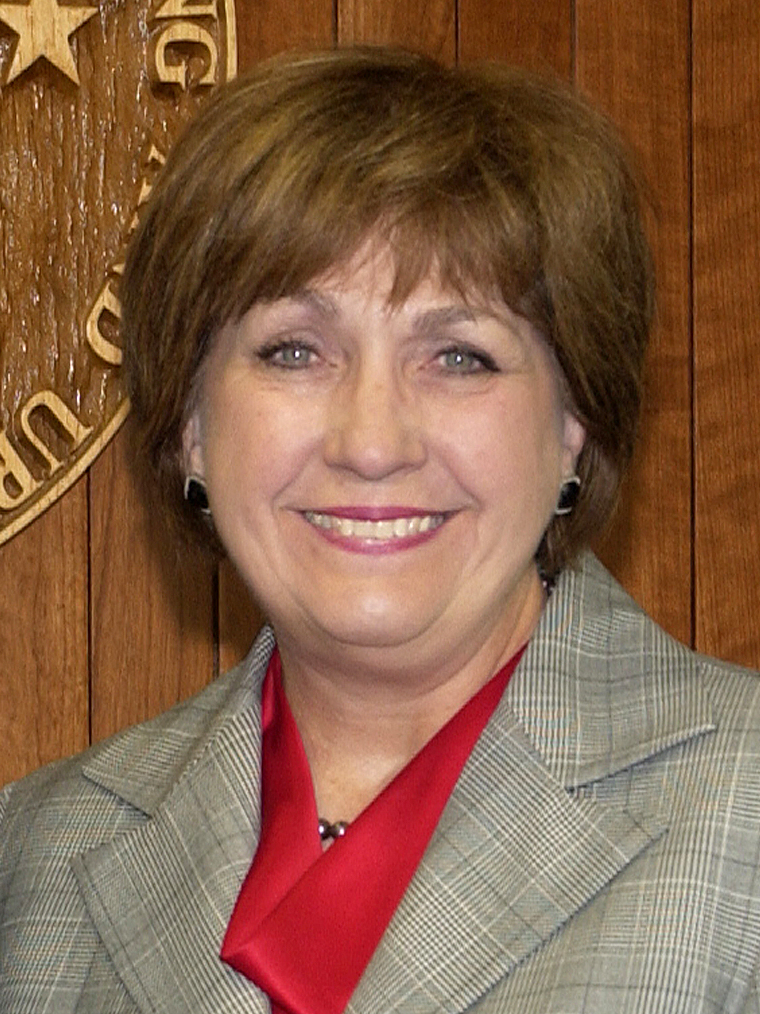

Candidate	Kathleen Blanco	Kevin Joseph Duplantis	Cornel Martin
Party	Democratic	Republican	Republican
Popular vote	968,249	121,269	98,122
Percentage	80.22%	10.05%	8.13%
- Parish results Blanco: 50–60% 70–80% 80–90% >90%
Lieutenant Governor before election
Kathleen Blanco
Democratic
Elected Lieutenant Governor
Kathleen Blanco
Democratic

The 1999 Louisiana lieutenant gubernatorial election was held on October 23, 1999, in order to elect the lieutenant governor of Louisiana. Incumbent Democratic lieutenant governor Kathleen Blanco defeated Republican candidates Kevin Joseph Duplantis and Cornel Martin and Reform candidate Sadie Roberts-Joseph.

== Background ==
Elections in Louisiana—with the exception of U.S. presidential elections—follow a variation of the open primary system called the jungle primary or the nonpartisan blanket primary. Candidates of any and all parties are listed on one ballot; voters need not limit themselves to the candidates of one party. Unless one candidate takes more than 50% of the vote in the first round, a run-off election is then held between the top two candidates, who may in fact be members of the same party. Texas uses this same format for its special elections. In this election, incumbent Democratic lieutenant governor Kathleen Blanco received more than 50% of the vote in the first round, so no run-off election was held.

== Runoff election ==
On election day, October 23, 1999, incumbent Democratic lieutenant governor Kathleen Blanco defeated her foremost opponent Republican candidate Kevin Joseph Duplantis by a margin of 846,980 votes, thereby retaining Democratic control over the office of lieutenant governor. Blanco was sworn in for her second term on January 4, 2000.

=== Results ===
Louisiana lieutenant gubernatorial election, 1999
Party	Candidate	Votes	%
Democratic	Kathleen Blanco (incumbent)	968,249	80.22
Republican	Kevin Joseph Duplantis	121,269	10.05
Republican	Cornel Martin	98,122	8.13
Reform	Sadie Roberts-Joseph	19,345	1.60
Total votes		1,206,285	100.00
Democratic hold			
