= 1999 Rugby Borough Council election =

1999 UK local government election

Elections to Rugby Borough Council were held on 6 May 1999. One third of the council seats were up for election. The council stayed under no overall control. The number of councillors for each party after the election were Labour 22, Conservative 11, Liberal Democrat 7, Residents 4 and Independent 4.

== Election result ==
Rugby local election result 1999
Party	Seats	Gains	Losses	Net gain/loss	Seats %	Votes %	Votes	+/−
Labour	9			0	52.9			
Liberal Democrats	4			+2	23.5			
Conservative	3			-1	17.6			
Residents	1			-1	5.9			
