= 1999 Three Rivers District Council election =

1999 UK local government election

The 1999 Three Rivers District Council election was held on 6 May 1999. The whole council was up for election with boundary changes since the last election in 1998. The Liberal Democrats gained overall control of the council from no overall control.

== Election results ==
Three Rivers local election result 1999
Party	Seats	Gains	Losses	Net gain/loss	Seats %	Votes %	Votes	+/−
Liberal Democrats	26			+3	54.2			
Conservative	15			-2	31.3			
Labour	7			-1	14.6			
