= 1999–2000 Belizean municipal elections =

A series of municipal elections were held on March 1, 1999, and March 1, 2000, to fill seats in the various town councils and city councils in Belize. It was the last Belize City council election held independently of the town boards, and also the last in which a nine-member council was elected. Sixty-five seats were available, of which the ruling People's United Party won sixty and the United Democratic Party won five.

In the 2000 election, voter turnout in 3 of the 8 municipalities was less than 12%.
