= Hastings Borough Council elections =

Local government elections in East Sussex, England

Half of Hastings Borough Council in East Sussex, England is elected every two years, while before 2002 the council was elected by thirds. Since the last boundary changes in 2002, 32 councillors have been elected from 16 wards. The Council was held by the Labour Party from 2010 to 2022 when the elections returned a No Overall Control result, leading the Labour Party to form a coalition with the Green Party. This coalition broke down when 6 Labour Councillors resigned from the Labour Party and formed the Hastings Independent Group. Between January 2024 and the May 2024 elections the Council was led by an alliance between the Hastings Independent Group and the Green Party. The 2024 election returned a result of No Overall Control and the Council is now minority led by the Green Party. The 2026 elections resulted in Green control.

== Council elections ==
Composition of the council
Year	Conservative	Labour	Liberal Democrats (Note: Includes totals for the predecessors of the Liberal Democrats, the Liberal Party and SDP (both of which participated in the Alliance).)	Green	Independents & Others	Council control after election
Local government reorganisation; council established (33 seats)
1973	12	11	9	–	1	No overall control
1976	20	8	4	0	1	Conservative
New ward boundaries (32 seats)
1979	16	8	7	0	1	Conservative
1980	15	9	7	0	1	No overall control
1982	13	8	10	0	1	No overall control
1983	12	9	9	0	2	No overall control
1984	13	8	10	0	1	No overall control
1986	11	8	13	0	0	No overall control
1987	11	7	14	0	0	No overall control
1988	12	8	12	0	0	No overall control
1990	13	9	9	0	1	No overall control
1991	12	10	9	0	1	No overall control
1992	14	9	9	0	0	No overall control
1994	8	10	12	0	2	No overall control
1995	5	12	14	0	1	No overall control
1996	0	15	17	0	0	Liberal Democrats
1998	1	18	13	0	0	Labour
1999	2	18	12	0	0	Labour
2000	6	18	8	0	0	Labour
New ward boundaries (32 seats) (Note: Changed from one-third to half council elections)
2002	10	21	1	0	0	Labour
2004	13	15	4	0	0	No overall control
2006	17	10	5	0	0	Conservative
2008	15	13	3	0	1	No overall control
2010	15	16	1	0	0	No overall control
2012	10	22	0	0	0	Labour
2014	8	24	0	0	0	Labour
2016	8	24	0	0	0	Labour
New ward boundaries (32 seats)
2018	8	24	0	0	0	Labour
2021	12	19	0	1	0	Labour
2022	12	15	0	5	0	No overall control
2024	5	8	0	12	7	No overall control
2026	2	4	0	19	7	Green

== Borough result maps ==
2002 results map

2004 results map

2006 results map

2008 results map

2010 results map

2012 results map

2014 results map

2016 results map

2018 results map

2021 results map

2022 results map

2024 results map

2026 results map

== By-election results ==
=== 1994-1998 ===
Gensing By-Election 3 July 1997
Party	Candidate	Votes	%	±%
Liberal Democrats		464	47.5	+5.4
Labour		326	33.4	+0.0
Conservative		104	10.6	−9.8
Liberal		82	8.4	+8.4
Majority		138	14.1	
Turnout		976	27.0	
Liberal Democrats hold		Swing		

St Helens By-Election 12 March 1998
Party	Candidate	Votes	%	±%
Liberal Democrats		479	40.3	−11.9
Conservative		438	36.8	+12.5
Labour		272	22.9	−0.7
Majority		41	3.5	
Turnout		1,189	25	
Liberal Democrats hold		Swing		

=== 1998-2002 ===
Silverhill By-Election 7 June 2001
Party	Candidate	Votes	%	±%
Labour		918	44.6	+1.1
Conservative		670	32.6	+17.2
Liberal Democrats		469	22.8	−18.3
Majority		248	12.0	
Turnout		2,057		
Labour hold		Swing		

=== 2002-2006 ===
Conquest By-Election 19 June 2003
Party	Candidate	Votes	%	±%
Conservative	Gladys Martin	504	37.6	−4.4
Liberal Democrats	Colin Dormer	294	21.9	−0.7
Labour	John Ward	274	20.4	−2.4
Independent	Robert Harris	253	18.9	+6.4
Green	Kevin Young	17	1.3	+1.3
Majority		210	15.7	
Turnout		1,342	34.5	
Conservative hold		Swing		

=== 2006-2010 ===
Gensing By-Election 3 May 2007
Party	Candidate	Votes	%	±%
Labour	Andrew Cartwright	516	34.2	+8.0
Conservative	Simon Corello	475	31.5	−15.7
Liberal Democrats	Tricia Kennelly	332	22.0	+2.2
Green	Sally Phillips	92	6.1	−0.7
BNP	John Martin	55	3.6	+3.6
UKIP	Mick Turner	38	2.5	+2.5
Majority		41	2.7	
Turnout		1,508	37.8	
Labour gain from Conservative		Swing		

Silverhill By-Election 3 May 2007
Party	Candidate	Votes	%	±%
Labour	Bruce Dowling	555	39.2	+4.5
Conservative	Matthew Lock	482	34.1	−9.1
Liberal Democrats	Mike Howard	254	18.0	−4.1
BNP	Nicholas Prince	84	5.9	+5.9
UKIP	Diane Granger	40	2.8	+2.8
Majority		73	5.1	
Turnout		1,415	41.9	
Labour gain from Conservative		Swing		

St Helens By-Election 10 December 2009
Party	Candidate	Votes	%	±%
Conservative	Simon Corello	609	40.7	−17.9
Labour	Michael Ward	550	36.7	−12.5
Liberal Democrats	John Tunbridge	210	14.0	−3.2
BNP	Stephen Weir	93	6.2	+6.2
English Democrat	Rod Bridger	36	2.4	+2.4
Majority		59	4.0	
Turnout		1,498	37.4	
Conservative hold		Swing		

=== 2014-2018 ===
Central St. Leonards By-Election 9 July 2015
Party	Candidate	Votes	%	±%
Labour	Terry Dowling	481	44.0	−9.1
Conservative	John Rankin	259	23.7	+10.9
Independent	Clive Gross	184	16.8	+9.4
UKIP	Kevin Hill	77	7.0	−8.8
Green	Alan Dixon	75	6.9	−0.9
Liberal Democrats	Susan Tait	17	1.6	−1.5
Majority		222	20.3	
Turnout		993		
Labour hold		Swing		

St. Helens By-Election 9 July 2015
Party	Candidate	Votes	%	±%
Conservative	Martin Clarke	663	43.5	+3.6
Labour	Graham Crane	557	36.5	+2.1
Liberal Democrats	Gary Spencer-Holmes	135	8.9	+5.0
UKIP	Kenneth Pankhurst	120	7.9	−13.9
Green	Christopher Petts	48	3.1	NA
Majority		106	7.0	
Turnout		1523		
Conservative hold		Swing		
