= 2022 Hastings Borough Council election =

Election in Hastings, East Sussex, England

← 2021	5 May 2022	2024 →

16 out of 32 seats to Hastings Borough Council 17 seats needed for a majority

	First party	Second party	Third party
Party	Labour	Conservative	Green
Seats won	9	4	3
Seat change	▼3	Steady	▲3
Popular vote	9,649	6,790	5,377
Percentage	42.1%	29.6%	23.5%
Swing	▲4.5pp	▼11.1pp	▲7.2pp
- Results map by ward
Council control before election
Labour
Council control after the election
No overall control

The 2022 Hastings Borough Council election took place on 5 May 2022 to elect members of Hastings Borough Council in the county of East Sussex, England. This was on the same day as other local elections. 16 of the 32 seats were up for election.

== Background ==
Since its creation in 1973, Hastings has been under the control of all 3 major parties. The council was under no overall control until 1976, when the Conservatives won the council, before reverting to no overall control in 1980. The Liberal Democrats won the council briefly from 1996 to 1998, a period which also saw the Conservatives lose representation on the council. Labour controlled the council from 1998 to 2004. The Conservatives briefly held the council from 2006 to 2008, before Labour regained it in 2010. In the 2021 election, the Conservatives gained 4 with 40.7% of the vote, Labour lost 5 with 37.6%, and the Green Party gained their first seat on the council with 16.3%.

The seats up for election this year were last elected in 2018. In that election, no net gains or losses were made, and Labour achieved 48.6% of the vote, the Conservatives 31.3%, and the Green Party 10.8%.

== Previous council composition ==
After 2021 election		Before 2022 election	
Party	Seats	Party	Seats
Labour	19	Labour	18
Conservative	12	Conservative	12
Green	1	Green	2

Changes:

- December 2021: Claire Carr, councillor for the Castle ward, joins Green Party from Labour

== Results ==
2022 Hastings Borough Council election
Party	This election			Full council			This election		
Party	Seats	Net	Seats %	Other	Total	Total %	Votes	Votes %	+/−
Labour	9	▼3	56.3	6	15	46.9	9,649	42.1	+4.5
Conservative	4	Steady	25.0	8	12	37.5	6,790	29.6	-11.1
Green	3	▲3	18.8	2	5	15.6	5,377	23.5	+7.2
Liberal Democrats	0	Steady	0.0	0	0	0.0	1,082	4.7	-0.7
Communist	0	Steady	0.0	0	0	0.0	22	0.1	N/A

== Results by ward ==
An asterisk (*) indicates an incumbent councillor.

=== Ashdown ===
Ashdown
Party	Candidate	Votes	%	±%
Conservative	Michael Edwards*	619	49.7	−11.3
Labour	Jane Hartley	350	28.1	+6.4
Liberal Democrats	Nick Perry	166	13.3	+5.0
Green	Andrea Needham	110	8.8	−0.2
Majority		269	21.6	
Turnout		1,245		
Conservative hold		Swing	▼8.9	

=== Baird ===
Baird
Party	Candidate	Votes	%	±%
Labour	Mike Turner*	656	51.9	+9.5
Conservative	Hannah Fisher	473	37.5	−11.0
Green	Dan Hope	92	7.3	+1.1
Liberal Democrats	Emlyn Jones	42	3.3	+0.4
Majority		183	14.4	
Turnout		1,263		
Labour hold		Swing	▲10.3	

=== Braybrooke ===
Braybrooke
Party	Candidate	Votes	%	±%
Labour	Margi O'Callaghan	804	53.4	+6.6
Green	Sally Phillips	322	21.0	+2.9
Conservative	Craig Andrew	307	20.0	−11.0
Liberal Democrats	Veronica Chessell	80	5.2	+0.1
Communist	Nicholas Davies	22	1.4	N/A
Majority		482	32.4	
Turnout		1,535		
Labour hold		Swing	▲1.9	

=== Castle ===
Castle
Party	Candidate	Votes	%	±%
Labour	Judy Rogers*	727	42.0	−1.8
Green	Becca Horn	722	41.7	+16.7
Conservative	Sue Clarke	232	13.4	−8.8
Liberal Democrats	Jonathan Stoodley	52	3.0	−6.0
Majority		5	0.3	
Turnout		1,733		
Labour hold		Swing	▼9.3	

=== Central St Leonards ===
Central St Leonards
Party	Candidate	Votes	%	±%
Green	Tony Collins	745	43.6	+18.4
Labour	Ruby Cox*	711	41.6	−2.1
Conservative	Mus Samadi	204	11.9	−12.4
Liberal Democrats	Steve Milton	50	2.9	−3.9
Majority		34	2.0	
Turnout		1,710		
Green gain from Labour		Swing	▲10.3	

=== Conquest ===
Conquest
Party	Candidate	Votes	%	±%
Conservative	John Rankin*	623	48.3	−13.0
Labour	Kenan Hakko	346	26.8	+3.6
Liberal Democrats	Robert Wakeford	221	17.1	+9.0
Green	Gabriel Carlyle	100	7.8	+0.4
Majority		277	21.5	
Turnout		1,290		
Conservative hold		Swing	▼8.3	

=== Gensing ===
Gensing
Party	Candidate	Votes	%	±%
Green	Amanda Jobson	776	45.3	+20.0
Labour	Kim Forward*	671	39.2	−6.6
Conservative	Chris Meaden	205	12.0	−10.8
Liberal Democrats	Susan Stoodley	61	3.6	−2.5
Majority		105	6.1	
Turnout		1,713		
Green gain from Labour		Swing	▲13.3	

=== Hollington ===
Hollington
Party	Candidate	Votes	%	±%
Labour	Paul Barnett*	581	61.0	+7.4
Conservative	Stuart Murphy	279	29.3	−7.2
Green	Tracey Lord	93	9.8	+3.0
Majority		302	31.7	
Turnout		953		
Labour hold		Swing	▲7.3	

=== Maze Hill ===
Maze Hill
Party	Candidate	Votes	%	±%
Conservative	Andy Patmore*	611	43.1	−8.6
Labour	Justin Greenland	365	25.7	−2.2
Green	Beccy McCray	268	18.9	+3.5
Liberal Democrats	Terry Keen	175	12.3	+7.3
Majority		246	17.4	
Turnout		1,419		
Conservative hold		Swing	▼3.2	

=== Old Hastings ===
Old Hastings
Party	Candidate	Votes	%	±%
Labour	James Bacon*	981	51.0	+25.6
Green	Benjamin Pacey	701	36.5	−15.9
Conservative	Kim Hollis	241	12.5	−7.8
Majority		280	14.5	
Turnout		1,923		
Labour hold		Swing	▲20.8	

=== Ore ===
Ore
Party	Candidate	Votes	%	±%
Labour	Simon Willis	544	43.6	+7.0
Conservative	James Hollis	484	38.8	−5.7
Green	Gary Rolfe	219	17.6	+1.7
Majority		60	4.8	
Turnout		1,247		
Labour hold		Swing	▲6.4	

=== Silverhill ===
Silverhill
Party	Candidate	Votes	%	±%
Labour	Nigel Sinden*	698	44.5	+5.8
Conservative	Sophie De-Roe	625	39.8	−3.4
Green	Dave Carey-Stuart	184	11.7	−1.0
Liberal Democrats	Lee Grant	62	4.0	−1.4
Majority		73	4.7	
Turnout		1,569		
Labour hold		Swing	▲4.6	

=== St Helens ===
St Helens
Party	Candidate	Votes	%	±%
Labour	Andy Batsford*	941	49.7	+16.2
Conservative	Laurie Loe	746	39.4	−10.3
Green	Lucy Brennan	130	6.9	−4.2
Liberal Democrats	Bob Lloyd	75	4.0	−1.7
Majority		195	10.3	
Turnout		1,892		
Labour hold		Swing	▲13.3	

=== Tressell ===
Tressell
Party	Candidate	Votes	%	±%
Green	Glenn Haffenden	635	55.9	+36.5
Labour	Liam Crowter	325	28.6	−16.4
Conservative	Judith Sillem	175	15.4	−15.9
Majority		310	27.3	
Turnout		1,135		
Green gain from Labour		Swing	▲26.5	

=== West St Leonards ===
West St Leonards
Party	Candidate	Votes	%	±%
Conservative	Matthew Beaver*	508	49.6	−7.1
Labour	Christopher Munn	268	26.2	+2.3
Green	Sherry Clark	150	14.6	+4.4
Liberal Democrats	Stewart Rayment	98	9.6	+0.4
Majority		240	23.4	
Turnout		1,024		
Conservative hold		Swing	▼4.7	

=== Wishing Tree ===
Wishing Tree
Party	Candidate	Votes	%	±%
Labour	John Cannan	681	53.7	+7.7
Conservative	Roger Streeten	458	36.1	−4.7
Green	Stephanie Fawbert	130	10.2	+1.7
Majority		223	17.6	
Turnout		1,269		
Labour hold		Swing	▲6.2	

== Changes 2022–2024 ==
In May 2023 Lucian Fernando joined Reform UK, having been elected as a Conservative in 2021.
