= 2016 Hastings Borough Council election =

2016 UK local government election

The 2016 Hastings Borough Council election took place on 5 May 2016 to elect members of Hastings Borough Council in England. This was on the same day as other local elections.

== See also ==
- 2014 Hastings Borough Council election
- 2012 Hastings Borough Council election
- 2010 Hastings Borough Council election
- 2008 Hastings Borough Council election
