= 2024 Hastings Borough Council election =

Local election in Hastings, England

← 2022	2 May 2024	2026 →

16 out of 32 seats to Hastings Borough Council 17 seats needed for a majority

	First party	Second party	Third party
Leader	Julia Hilton	Heather Bishop	N/A (Note: Of the eleven independent councillors prior to the election, eight sat together as the 'Hastings Independent Group' led by Paul Barnett.)
Party	Green	Labour	Independent
Last election	5 seats, 23.5%	15 seats, 42.1%	0 seats, 0.0%
Seats before	4	6	11
Seats won	9	5	0
Seats after	12	8	7
Seat change	▲8	▲2	▼4
Popular vote	9,013	7,724	1,765
Percentage	37.7%	32.4%	7.4%
Swing	▲14.2%	▼9.7%	N/A
	Fourth party	Fifth party
Leader	Andy Patmore
Party	Conservative	Reform UK
Last election	12 seats, 29.6%	0 seats, 0.0%
Seats before	10	1
Seats won	2	0
Seats after	5	0
Seat change	▼5	▼1
Popular vote	4,550	345
Percentage	19.1%	1.4%
Swing	▼10.5%	N/A
- Winner of each seat at the 2024 Hastings Borough Council election
Leader before election
Julia Hilton
Green
No overall control
Leader after election
Julia Hilton
Green
No overall control

The 2024 Hastings Borough Council election was held on Thursday 2 May 2024, alongside the other local elections in the United Kingdom being held on the same day. Half of the 32 members of Hastings Borough Council in East Sussex were elected. The council remained under no overall control, but the Green Party made significant gains in their number of seats, becoming the largest party on the council. The Conservatives performed poorly, losing a third of their 2023 share of the vote and half their seats. Reform UK also lost their only seat, which they had gained in May 2023 following a Conservative Councillor switching parties. The Labour group leader, Heather Bishop, lost her seat.

Prior to the election, the council was being run by a minority coalition of the Green Party and the subset of the independent councillors known as the 'Hastings Independent Group'. Following the election a Green minority administration formed instead.

== Background ==
Hastings historically been controlled by all 3 major parties. The Conservatives first won a majority in 1976, but lost the council to no overall control in 1980. The Liberal Democrats won control in 1996, with the Conservatives having lost all their seats on the council the previous year. The Labour Party won control of the council 2 years later, and held a majority until 2002, with the Conservatives retaking the council in 2006. Labour gained the council in 2010, and controlled the council until 2022.

In 2022, Labour won 9 seats (down 3) with 42.1% of the vote, the Conservatives won 4 with 29.6%, and the Green Party won 3 (up 3) with 23.5%. Following this election, Labour formed a majority coalition with the Green Party, but later formed a minority administration after the Greens withdrew from the coalition. Labour lost their position as the largest group on the council in December 2023, after the resignation of 8 councillors from Labour and the suspension of another. A minority coalition of the Green Party and the 8 who left Labour was then formed, with a Green Party leader.

The seats up for election in 2024 were last contested in 2021; because of the delay of all local elections due to the COVID-19 pandemic, the seats are up for election after 3 years rather than the usual 4. In that election, the Conservatives won 8 seats (up 4) with 40.7% of the vote, Labour won 7 (down 5) with 37.6%, and the Green Party won 1 (up 1) with 16.3%

== Previous council composition ==
After 2022 election		Before 2024 election		After 2024 election	
Party	Seats	Party	Seats	Party	Seats
Independent	0	Independent	11	Independent	7
Conservative	12	Conservative	10	Conservative	5
Labour	15	Labour	6	Labour	8
Green	5	Green	4	Green	12
Reform UK	0	Reform UK	1	Reform UK	0

Changes:

- April 2023: Lucian Fernando leaves Conservatives to sit as an independent
- May 2023: Lucian Fernando (independent) joins Reform UK
- October 2023: John Rankin leaves Conservatives to sit as an independent
- December 2023: Paul Barnett, Andy Batsford, John Cannan, Maya Evans, Ali Roark, Nigel Sinden, Mike Turner, and Simon Willis leave Labour to sit as independents; Sabina Arthur suspended from Labour
- January 2024: Claire Carr leaves Green Party to sit as an independent

== Summary ==
=== Election result ===
2024 Hastings Borough Council election
Party	This election			Full council			This election		
Party	Seats	Net	Seats %	Other	Total	Total %	Votes	Votes %	+/−
Green	9	▲8	56.3	3	12	37.5	9,013	37.7	+14.2
Labour	5	▲2	31.3	3	8	25.0	7,724	32.4	–9.7
Independent	0	▼4	0.0	7	7	21.9	1,765	7.4	N/A
Conservative	2	▼5	12.5	3	5	15.6	4,550	19.1	–10.5
Liberal Democrats	0	Steady	0.0	0	0	0.0	479	2.0	–2.7
Reform UK	0	▼1	0.0	0	0	0.0	345	1.4	N/A

== Ward results ==
An asterisk (*) indicates an incumbent councillor.

=== Ashdown ===
Ashdown
Party	Candidate	Votes	%	±%
Conservative	Sorrell Marlow-Eastwood*	470	38.5	–11.5
Labour	Steve Thorpe	398	32.6	+4.5
Green	Daniel Hope	167	13.7	+4.9
Reform UK	Thee Kuga	116	9.5	N/A
Liberal Democrats	Stephen Milton	69	5.7	–7.6
Majority		72	5.9	
Turnout		1,220		
Conservative hold		Swing	▼8.0	

=== Baird ===
Baird
Party	Candidate	Votes	%	±%
Green	Yunis Smith	387	29.0	+21.7
Conservative	Liam Atkins	312	23.4	–14.1
Labour	Liam Crowter	312	23.4	–28.5
Independent	Peter Bailey	289	21.6	N/A
Liberal Democrats	Emlyn Jones	35	2.6	–0.7
Majority		75	5.6	
Turnout		1,335		
Green gain from Conservative		Swing	▲17.9	

=== Braybrooke ===
Braybrooke
Party	Candidate	Votes	%	±%
Green	Mark Etherington	1,001	56.3	+35.3
Labour	Tim Shand	616	34.6	–18.8
Conservative	Shelley Bland	161	9.1	–10.9
Majority		385	21.7	
Turnout		1,778		
Green gain from Independent		Swing	▲27.1	

=== Castle ===
Castle
Party	Candidate	Votes	%	±%
Green	Becca Horn	1,108	55.7	+14.0
Labour	James Thomas	700	35.2	–6.8
Conservative	Rob Cooke	181	9.1	–4.3
Majority		408	20.5	
Turnout		1,989		
Green gain from Independent		Swing	▲10.4	

=== Central St Leonards ===
Central St Leonards
Party	Candidate	Votes	%	±%
Green	Adele Bates	820	45.4	+1.8
Labour	Josh Matthews	541	29.9	–11.7
Independent	Steph Warren	275	15.2	N/A
Conservative	Craig Andrew	156	8.6	–3.3
Independent	Richard Haberkost	15	0.8	N/A
Majority		279	13.5	
Turnout		1,807		
Green gain from Labour		Swing	▲6.8	

=== Conquest ===
Conquest
Party	Candidate	Votes	%	±%
Conservative	Paul Foster*	491	37.3	–11.0
Labour	Hugh Nicholson	386	29.3	+2.5
Independent	Anna Winston	191	14.5	N/A
Green	Tracey Lord	143	10.8	+3.0
Liberal Democrats	Stewart Rayment	107	8.1	–9.0
Majority		105	8.0	
Turnout		1,318		
Conservative hold		Swing	▼6.8	

=== Gensing ===
Gensing
Party	Candidate	Votes	%	±%
Green	Paula Warne	1,073	57.8	+12.5
Labour	Edwina Hughes	602	32.4	–6.8
Conservative	Christopher Meaden	183	9.8	–2.2
Majority		471	25.4	
Turnout		1,858		
Green gain from Labour		Swing	▲9.7	

=== Hollington ===
Hollington
Party	Candidate	Votes	%	±%
Labour	Danuta Kean	395	36.5	–24.5
Independent	Maya Evans*	351	32.5	N/A
Conservative	Stephen Butterton	261	24.1	–5.2
Green	Dulcie Reynolds	74	6.8	–3.0
Majority		44	4.0	
Turnout		1,081		
Labour gain from Independent				

=== Maze Hill ===
Maze Hill
Party	Candidate	Votes	%	±%
Green	Darren MacKenzie	590	37.9	+19.0
Labour	Mike Southon	397	25.5	–0.2
Conservative	Graeme Williams*	380	24.4	–18.7
Reform UK	Paul Murphy	83	5.3	N/A
Independent	Sarah Buller	68	4.4	N/A
Liberal Democrats	Bruce Meredeen	40	2.6	–9.7
Majority		193	12.4	
Turnout		1,558		
Green gain from Conservative		Swing	▲9.6	

=== Old Hastings ===
Old Hastings
Party	Candidate	Votes	%	±%
Green	Julia Hilton*	1,123	60.8	+24.3
Labour	Jeremy Hicks	536	29.0	–22.0
Conservative	Martin Clarke	189	10.2	–2.3
Majority		587	31.8	
Turnout		1,848		
Green hold		Swing	▲23.2	

=== Ore ===
Ore
Party	Candidate	Votes	%	±%
Green	Jo Walker	763	57.7	+40.1
Labour	Heather Bishop	327	24.7	–18.9
Conservative	Roger Streeten	195	14.8	–24.0
Liberal Democrats	Robert Wakeford	37	2.8	N/A
Majority		436	33.0	
Turnout		1,322		
Green gain from Conservative		Swing	▲29.5	

=== Silverhill ===
Silverhill
Party	Candidate	Votes	%	±%
Labour	Billie Barnes	643	40.9	–3.6
Conservative	Max Hewitt	393	25.0	–14.8
Green	Lesley Arshad	336	21.3	+9.6
Reform UK	Lucian Fernando*	146	9.3	N/A
Liberal Democrats	Terry Keen	56	3.6	–0.4
Majority		250	15.9	
Turnout		1,574		
Labour gain from Reform UK		Swing	▲5.6	

=== St Helens ===
St Helens
Party	Candidate	Votes	%	±%
Labour	David Whitehill	503	30.9	–18.8
Conservative	Peter Pragnell*	456	28.0	–11.4
Independent	Jackie Patton	293	18.0	N/A
Green	Ollie Hunter	287	17.6	+10.7
Liberal Democrats	Bob Lloyd	91	5.6	+1.6
Majority		47	2.9	
Turnout		1,630		
Labour gain from Conservative		Swing	▼3.7	

=== Tressell ===
Tressell
Party	Candidate	Votes	%	±%
Green	Natalie Gaimster	817	65.6	+9.7
Labour	Anna Sabin	324	26.0	–2.6
Conservative	Sue Clarke	104	8.4	–7.0
Majority		493	39.6	
Turnout		1,245		
Green gain from Independent		Swing	▲6.2	

=== West St Leonards ===
West St Leonards
Party	Candidate	Votes	%	±%
Labour	Trevor Webb	441	38.7	+12.5
Conservative	Karl Beaney*	402	35.3	–14.3
Green	Marisa McGreevy-Rose	182	16.0	+1.4
Independent	Adam Taylor-Foster	70	6.1	N/A
Liberal Democrats	Jonathon Stoodley	44	3.9	–5.7
Majority		39	3.4	
Turnout		1,139		
Labour gain from Conservative		Swing	▲13.4	

=== Wishing Tree ===
Wishing Tree
Party	Candidate	Votes	%	±%
Labour	Helen Kay	603	51.4	–2.3
Conservative	Rob Lee	216	18.4	–17.7
Independent	Ian Miller	213	18.1	N/A
Green	Mike Wharton	142	12.1	+1.9
Majority		387	33.0	
Turnout		1,174		
Labour hold		Swing	▲7.7	
