= 1999 Hastings Borough Council election =

1999 UK local government election

The 1999 Hastings Borough Council election took place on 6 May 1999 to elect members of Hastings Borough Council in East Sussex, England. One third of the council was up for election and the Labour Party stayed in overall control of the council.

After the election, the composition of the council was:

- Labour 18
- Liberal Democrat 12
- Conservative 2

== Election result ==
Hastings local election result 1999
Party	Seats	Gains	Losses	Net gain/loss	Seats %	Votes %	Votes	+/−
Labour	6			0	60.0			
Liberal Democrats	3			-1	30.0			
Conservative	1			+1	10.0			
