= 2012 Hastings Borough Council election =

2012 UK local government election

Map of the results of the 2012 Hastings council election. Labour in red and Conservatives in blue.

The 2012 Hastings Borough Council election was held on Thursday 3 May 2012 to elect members of Hastings Borough Council in East Sussex, England. Half of the council was up for election, and Labour remained in overall control of the council. Overall turnout was 30.9%, a significant reduction compared to the previous results in 2010, when the elections were held alongside a parliamentary general election.

After the election, the composition of the council was:

- Labour 23 (+6 compared to 2010)
- Conservative 9 (-5)
- Liberal Democrat 0 (-1)

== Election result ==
Hastings local election result 2012
Party	Seats	Gains	Losses	Net gain/loss	Seats %	Votes %	Votes	+/−
Labour	13	6	0	+6	81.3	53.0	10,402	+12.8
Conservative	3	0	5	-5	18.8	33.5	6,572	-3.7
Liberal Democrats	0	0	1	-1	0.0	9.0	1,771	-11.6
Green	0	0	0	0	0.0	3.9	774	+3.9
BNP	0	0	0	0	0.0	0.7	92	-1.4

== Ward results ==
Ashdown
Party	Candidate	Votes	%	±%
Conservative	Rob Cooke	652	51.0	−0.2
Labour	Dave Baker	507	39.6	+11.3
Liberal Democrats	Paul Burton	120	9.4	−11.0
Majority		145	11.4	−11.5
Turnout		1,279	27.1	−38.7
Conservative hold		Swing	-5.8	

Baird
Party	Candidate	Votes	%	±%
Labour	Warren Davies	757	63.0	+20.2
Conservative	Richard Vallery	380	31.6	−8.3
Liberal Democrats	Oliver Maloney	64	5.3	−12.0
Majority		377	31.4	
Turnout		1,201	33.2	−25.1
Labour gain from Conservative		Swing	+14.3	

Braybrooke
Party	Candidate	Votes	%	±%
Labour	Dominic Sabetian	955	70.7	+16.2
Conservative	Chris Connor	321	23.8	−4.3
Liberal Democrats	Stewart Rayment	75	5.6	−11.7
Majority		634	46.9	+20.5
Turnout		1,351	35.9	−30.2
Labour hold		Swing	+10.3	

Castle
Party	Candidate	Votes	%	±%
Labour	Judy Rogers	644	47.5	−2.5
Liberal Democrats	Nick Perry	388	28.6	+4.2
Conservative	Allan Rowe	170	12.5	−13.4
Green	Maresa Bossano	153	11.3	+11.3
Majority		256	18.9	−5.5
Turnout		1,355	31.9	−23.9
Labour hold		Swing	-3.4	

Central St. Leonards
Party	Candidate	Votes	%	±%
Labour	Trevor Webb	646	57.0	+3.5
Conservative	Leonie Nolan	259	22.8	−2.4
Green	Sarah Evans	135	11.9	+11.9
Liberal Democrats	Paul Smith	94	8.3	−13.0
Majority		387	34.2	+5.9
Turnout		1,134	27.1	−23.2
Labour hold		Swing	+3.0	

Conquest
Party	Candidate	Votes	%	±%
Conservative	Peter Pragnell	719	56.4	+3.4
Labour	Andrew Ives	442	34.7	+7.7
Liberal Democrats	Anne Gallop	114	8.9	−11.1
Majority		277	21.7	−4.3
Turnout		1,275	33.3	−38.3
Conservative hold		Swing	-2.2	

Gensing
Party	Candidate	Votes	%	±%
Labour	Kim Forward	752	60.2	+13.6
Conservative	Rob Lee	298	23.9	−5.1
Green	William Davis	112	9.0	+9.0
Liberal Democrats	Graham Hopgood	87	7.0	−17.4
Majority		454	36.3	+18.7
Turnout		1,249	30.5	+27.1
Labour hold		Swing	+9.4	

Hollington
Party	Candidate	Votes	%	±%
Labour	Emily Westley	676	61.3	
Conservative	Nigel Barry	337	30.6	
Liberal Democrats	Vanessa Burton	50	4.5	
BNP	Nick Prince	40	3.6	
Majority		339	30.7	
Turnout		1,103	25.5	−27.6
Labour hold		Swing		

Maze Hill
Party	Candidate	Votes	%	±%
Conservative	Maureen Charlesworth	573	45.4	−3.4
Labour	James Bacon	529	42.0	+11.4
Liberal Democrats	Sue Tait	159	12.6	−8.1
Majority		44	3.4	−14.8
Turnout		1,261	31.2	−29.2
Conservative hold		Swing	-7.4	

Old Hastings
Party	Candidate	Votes	%	±%
Labour	Dawn Poole	804	51.5	+12.0
Conservative	Terry Fawthrop	424	27.1	−5.5
Green	Maya Evans	203	13.0	+13.0
Liberal Democrats	Tony Seymour	131	8.4	−19.4
Majority		380	24.4	
Turnout		1,562	36.2	−30.9
Labour gain from Liberal Democrats		Swing	+15.7	

Ore
Party	Candidate	Votes	%	±%
Labour	Richard Street	633	57.3	+9.6
Conservative	Mark Charlesworth	396	35.8	−1.5
Liberal Democrats	Vivienne Bond	76	6.9	−5.5
Majority		237	21.5	+11.1
Turnout		1,105	30.7	−3.5
Labour gain from Conservative		Swing	+5.5	

Silverhill
Party	Candidate	Votes	%	±%
Labour	Nigel Sinden	564	46.2	+10.3
Conservative	Matthew Lock	507	41.6	+5.1
Green	Dave Carey-Stuart	92	7.5	+7.5
Liberal Democrats	Chris Beaumont	57	4.7	−12.3
Majority		57	4.6	
Turnout		1,220	35.5	−31.9
Labour gain from Conservative		Swing	+2.6	

St Helens
Party	Candidate	Votes	%	±%
Labour	Andy Batsford	665	46.3	+8.9
Conservative	Matthew Lock	663	46.1	+2.7
Liberal Democrats	Robert Wakeford	109	7.6	−11.6
Majority		2	0.2	
Turnout		1,437	36.3	−37.1
Labour gain from Conservative		Swing	+3.1	

Tressell
Party	Candidate	Votes	%	±%
Labour	Peter Chowney	499	59.5	+13.7
Conservative	Lyn Burgess	154	18.4	−7.1
Green	Sally Phillips	79	9.4	+9.4
Liberal Democrats	Kate Tudgay	55	6.6	−14.4
BNP	Mick Turner	52	6.5	−1.2
Majority		345	41.4	+21.1
Turnout		839	23.6	−31.2
Labour hold		Swing	+10.4	

West St Leonards
Party	Candidate	Votes	%	±%
Labour	Mike Howard	505	48.1	+14.6
Conservative	Matthew Beaver	443	42.2	−2.4
Liberal Democrats	Chris Dodwell	102	9.7	−12.2
Majority		62	5.9	
Turnout		1,050	27.0	−36.9
Labour gain from Conservative		Swing	+8.5	

Wishing Tree
Party	Candidate	Votes	%	±%
Labour	Phil Scott	824	69.2	+25.8
Conservative	Paul Saunders	276	23.2	−8.7
Liberal Democrats	Tricia Kennelly	90	7.6	−11.6
Majority		548	46.0	−34.5
Turnout		1,190	30.0	−32.7
Labour hold		Swing	+17.3	
