= 2014 Hastings Borough Council election =

2014 UK local government election

Map of the results of the 2014 Hastings council election. Labour in red and Conservatives in blue.

The 2014 Hastings Borough Council election was held on Thursday 22 May 2014 to elect members of Hastings Borough Council in East Sussex, England. Half of the council was up for election, and Labour remained in overall control of the council. The election took place on the same day as elections to the European Parliament.

After the election, the composition of the council was:

- Labour 24 (+1)
- Conservative 8 (-1)

== Election result ==
Hastings local election result 2014
Party	Seats	Gains	Losses	Net gain/loss	Seats %	Votes %	Votes	+/−
Labour	11	1	0	+1	68.8	47.8	10,910	+7.6
Conservative	5	0	1	-1	31.2	31.1	7,100	-6.1
UKIP	0	0	0	0	0.0	10.5	2,389	+10.5
Liberal Democrats	0	0	0	0	0.0	7.5	1,705	-13.1
Green	0	0	0	0	0.0	2.7	608	+2.7
Independent	0	0	0	0	0.0	0.4	96	-0.3

== Ward results ==
Comparisons for the purpose of determining a gain, hold or loss of a seat, and for all percentage changes, is to the last time these specific seats were up for election in 2010.

Ashdown
Party	Candidate	Votes	%	±%
Conservative	Michael Edwards	694	42.0	−9.2
UKIP	John Wilson	453	27.4	+27.4
Labour	Dave Baker	429	26.0	−2.3
Liberal Democrats	Tony Seymour	76	4.6	15.8
Majority		241	14.6	−8.3
Turnout		1,652	37.7	−28.1
Conservative hold		Swing	18.3% Con to UKIP	

Baird
Party	Candidate	Votes	%	±%
Labour	Mike Turner	656	48.9	+6.1
Conservative	Terry Keen	333	24.8	−15.1
UKIP	Deborah Thomas	310	23.1	+23.1
Liberal Democrats	Oliver Maloney	43	3.2	−14.1
Majority		323	24.1	+21.3
Turnout		1,342	37.6	−20.7
Labour hold		Swing	10.6% Con to Lab	

Braybrooke
Party	Candidate	Votes	%	±%
Labour	Sue Beaney	818	56.0	+1.5
Conservative	Martin Clarke	364	24.9	−3.2
Green	Sally Phillips	207	14.2	+14.2
Liberal Democrats	Stewart Rayment	72	4.9	−12.4
Majority		454	41.1	+14.7
Turnout		1,461	41.7	−24.4
Labour hold		Swing	2.4% Con to Lab	

Castle
Party	Candidate	Votes	%	±%
Labour	Lee Clark	769	53.1	+3.1
Liberal Democrats	Nick Perry	463	32.0	+7.6
Conservative	Graeme Williams	215	14.9	−10.7
Majority		306	21.1	−3.3
Turnout		1,447	37.5	−18.3
Labour hold		Swing	2.3% Lab to LD	

Central St. Leonards
Party	Candidate	Votes	%	±%
Labour	Jeremy Birch	691	53.1	−0.4
UKIP	Kevin O'Doherty	206	15.8	+15.8
Conservative	Adam Gibbons	167	12.8	−12.4
Green	Maya Evans	101	7.8	+7.8
Independent	Clive Gross	96	7.4	+7.4
Liberal Democrats	Paul Smith	40	3.1	−18.2
Majority		485	37.3	+9.0
Turnout		1,301	38.7	−11.6
Labour hold		Swing	14.1% Con to UKIP	

Conquest
Party	Candidate	Votes	%	±%
Conservative	Liam Atkins	742	47.5	−5.5
Labour	Eileen Masters	448	28.7	+1.7
UKIP	Ralph Atkinson	324	20.7	+20.7
Liberal Democrats	Lindsey Fellows	48	3.1	−16.9
Majority		294	18.8	−7.2
Turnout		1,562	40.6	−31.5
Conservative hold		Swing	3.6% Con to Lab	

Gensing
Party	Candidate	Votes	%	±%
Labour	Andrew Cartwright	803	54.9	+8.3
UKIP	Michael McIver	262	17.9	+17.9
Conservative	John Waterfall	191	13.1	−15.9
Green	Will Davis	141	9.6	+9.6
Liberal Democrats	Graham Hopgood	66	4.5	−19.9
Majority		541	37.0	+19.4
Turnout		1,463	36.1	−21.5
Labour hold		Swing	4.8% Lab to UKIP	

Hollington
Party	Candidate	Votes	%	±%
Labour	Bruce Dowling	576	45.7	
UKIP	Kenneth Pankhurst	404	32.0	
Conservative	Michael Lambrechs	230	18.2	
Liberal Democrats	Anne Gallop	51	4.0	
Majority		172	13.7	
Turnout		1,261	29.6	−23.5
Labour hold		Swing		

Maze Hill
Party	Candidate	Votes	%	±%
Conservative	Rob Lee	759	51.1	+2.3
Labour	Christopher Connelley	587	39.5	+8.9
Liberal Democrats	Sue Tait	139	9.4	−11.3
Majority		172	11.6	−6.6
Turnout		1,485	39.2	−21.2
Conservative hold		Swing	3.3% Con to Lab	

Old Hastings
Party	Candidate	Votes	%	±%
Labour	John Hodges	1,096	60.6	+21.1
Conservative	Arthur Burgess	577	31.9	−0.7
Liberal Democrats	Chris Dodwell	135	7.5	−20.3
Majority		519	28.7	+21.8
Turnout		1,808	44.0	−23.1
Labour hold		Swing	10.9% Con to Lab	

Ore
Party	Candidate	Votes	%	±%
Labour	Michael Wincott	686	57.4	+9.7
Conservative	Terry Fawthrop	413	34.6	−2.7
Liberal Democrats	Kate Tudgay	96	8.0	−4.4
Majority		273	22.8	+18.4
Turnout		1,195	34.7	+0.5
Labour hold		Swing	6.2% Con to Lab	

Silverhill
Party	Candidate	Votes	%	±%
Labour	Colin Fitzgerald	639	49.9	+14.1
Conservative	Matthew Lock	435	34.0	−2.5
Green	Dave Carey-Stuart	159	12.4	+12.4
Liberal Democrats	Wilfrid Pickard	48	3.7	+13.3
Majority		204	15.9	+15.9
Turnout		1,281	41.2	−26.2
Labour gain from Conservative		Swing	8.8% Con to Lab	

St Helens
Party	Candidate	Votes	%	±%
Conservative	Matthew Lock	787	39.9	−3.5
Labour	Graham Crane	678	34.4	−3.1
UKIP	Stuart Murphy	430	21.8	+21.8
Liberal Democrats	Robert Wakeford	76	3.9	−15.3
Majority		109	5.5	−0.5
Turnout		1,971	49.5	−33.9
Conservative hold		Swing	0.2% Con to Lab	

Tressell
Party	Candidate	Votes	%	±%
Labour	Tania Charman	660	64.1	+18.3
Conservative	Lyn Burgess	241	23.4	−1.9
Liberal Democrats	Philip Broad	128	12.4	−8.6
Majority		419	40.7	+20.4
Turnout		1,029	31.7	−23.1
Labour hold		Swing	10.1% Con to Lab	

West St Leonards
Party	Candidate	Votes	%	±%
Conservative	Matthew Beaver	596	47.8	+3.2
Labour	John Knowles	565	45.3	+12.4
Liberal Democrats	Chris Lewcock	87	7.0	−14.9
Majority		31	2.5	−8.6
Turnout		1,248	33.0	−30.9
Conservative hold		Swing	4.6% Con to Lab	

Wishing Tree
Party	Candidate	Votes	%	±%
Labour	Alan Roberts	809	62.1	+18.7
Conservative	Wendy Cooke	356	27.3	−4.6
Liberal Democrats	Patricia Kennelly	137	10.5	−8.7
Majority		453	34.8	+23.3
Turnout		1,302	35.1	−27.6
Labour hold		Swing	11.7% Con to Lab	
