= 2002 Hastings Borough Council election =

2002 UK local government election

Map of the results of the 2002 Hastings council election. Labour in red, Conservatives in blue and Liberal Democrats in yellow.

Elections to Hastings Borough Council were held on 2 May 2002. The whole council was up for election with boundary changes since the last election in 2000. The Labour Party kept overall control of the council. Overall turnout was 32.0%.

After the election, the composition of the council was:

- Labour 21
- Conservative 10
- Liberal Democrat 1

== Election result ==
Hastings local election result 2002
Party	Seats	Gains	Losses	Net gain/loss	Seats %	Votes %	Votes	+/−
Labour	21			+3	65.6	45.7	16,666	
Conservative	10			+4	31.3	33.0	12,051	
Liberal Democrats	1			-7	3.1	17.6	6,432	
Green	0			0	0	2.8	1,017	
Independent	0			0	0	0.7	264	
Rock 'n' Roll Loony	0			0	0	0.1	42	

== Ward results ==
Ashdown (2)
Party	Candidate	Votes	%	±%
Conservative	John Wilson	558		
Conservative	Robert Cooke	549		
Liberal Democrats	Colin Dormer	331		
Labour	Kenneth Hadler	324		
Labour	Inge Eveleigh	318		
Liberal Democrats	Henry Campbell	310		
Turnout		2,390	32.5	

Baird (2)
Party	Candidate	Votes	%	±%
Labour	Robert Hart	473		
Labour	Ion Castro	448		
Conservative	Gillian Bing	368		
Conservative	Esther Carpenter	362		
Liberal Democrats	Stephen Randell	175		
Turnout		1,826	27.0	

Braybrooke (2)
Party	Candidate	Votes	%	±%
Labour	Godfrey Daniel	831		
Labour	Dominic Sabetian	697		
Conservative	Raymond Marchant	343		
Conservative	Nicholas Prince	328		
Liberal Democrats	Janet Saxby	189		
Liberal Democrats	Roy Tobin	166		
Green	Amanda Eyre	81		
Green	Michael Turner	73		
Independent	Robert Longworth	68		
Turnout		2,776	38.1	

Castle (2)
Party	Candidate	Votes	%	±%
Liberal Democrats	Pamela Brown	627		
Labour	Clive Jackson	583		
Labour	Melanie Rycroft	541		
Liberal Democrats	Paul Smith	483		
Conservative	Cynthia Jones	153		
Conservative	Joan Patten	151		
Green	Laurence Homewood	121		
Turnout		2,659	32.5	

Central St Leonards (2)
Party	Candidate	Votes	%	±%
Labour	John Humphries	690		
Labour	Trevor Webb	608		
Conservative	Fiona Evans	405		
Conservative	Eve Martin	398		
Liberal Democrats	Thomas Leitch	171		
Green	Emily Johns	138		
Turnout		2,410	30.9	

Conquest (2)
Party	Candidate	Votes	%	±%
Conservative	Dennis Moon	656		
Conservative	Peter Pragnell	627		
Labour	Hugh Nicholson	357		
Liberal Democrats	Greg Rose	354		
Labour	Andrew Luke	325		
Independent	Robert Harris	196		
Turnout		2,515	35.6	

Gensing (2)
Party	Candidate	Votes	%	±%
Labour	Andrew Cartwright	498		
Labour	Ronald Rushbrook	436		
Liberal Democrats	Vivienne Bond	425		
Liberal Democrats	Gary Pantrey	346		
Conservative	Wendy Goldsmith	229		
Conservative	Joseph Jones	229		
Green	Modlinger	93		
Turnout		2,349	27.3	

Hollington (2)
Party	Candidate	Votes	%	±%
Labour	Paul Silverson	511		
Labour	Terry Soan	508		
Conservative	Philippe Bedford	177		
Conservative	Elfriede Molloy	176		
Liberal Democrats	Roger Weeden	111		
Green	Kevin Young	74		
Turnout		1,557	22.1	

Maze Hill (2)
Party	Candidate	Votes	%	±%
Conservative	Joy Waite	624		
Conservative	Maureen Charlesworth	623		
Liberal Democrats	Stephanie Edmonds	329		
Labour	Bruce Dowling	319		
Labour	Susannah Farley-Green	286		
Liberal Democrats	Peter Dalton	234		
Green	Mary Robertson	86		
Turnout		2,501	33.4	

Old Hastings (2)
Party	Candidate	Votes	%	±%
Labour	Michael Bigg	778		
Labour	Arthur Kitson	637		
Conservative	Ian Porter	473		
Conservative	Arthur Burgess	453		
Liberal Democrats	Susan Palmer	371		
Liberal Democrats	Anne Scott	328		
Green	Diana Marquand	137		
Turnout		3,177	39.3	

Ore (2)
Party	Candidate	Votes	%	±%
Labour	David Hancock	503		
Labour	Peter Chowney	450		
Conservative	Mark Charlesworth	268		
Liberal Democrats	Andrew Feeley	245		
Conservative	Jocette Wilson	222		
Green	Sally Phillips	118		
Turnout		1,806	27.0	

Silverhill (2)
Party	Candidate	Votes	%	±%
Labour	Annette Barton	601		
Labour	Alan Roberts	546		
Conservative	Theresa Lock	376		
Conservative	Shefali Nimbark	326		
Liberal Democrats	William Third	244		
Green	Simon Medhurst	96		
Turnout		2,189	35.3	

St Helens (2)
Party	Candidate	Votes	%	±%
Conservative	Keith Bing	781		
Conservative	Matthew Lock	760		
Labour	John Ward	637		
Labour	David Waller	631		
Liberal Democrats	Feargal Coffey	281		
Turnout		3,090	41.3	

Tressell (2)
Party	Candidate	Votes	%	±%
Labour	Jay Kramer	500		
Labour	Trevor May	452		
Conservative	Lyn Burgess	138		
Liberal Democrats	Robin Edmonds	137		
Conservative	Catherine Cassidy	131		
Turnout		1,358	23.2	

West St. Leonards (2)
Party	Candidate	Votes	%	±%
Conservative	Peter Finch	346		
Conservative	Matthew Beaver	337		
Labour	Thomas Munch-Petersen	286		
Labour	Keith Wood	277		
Liberal Democrats	Joan Feeley	206		
Liberal Democrats	Donald Wise	203		
Rock 'n' Roll Loony	Brett McLean	42		
Turnout		1,697	31.1	

Wishing Tree (2)
Party	Candidate	Votes	%	±%
Labour	Jeremy Birch	895		
Labour	Philip Scott	720		
Conservative	Raymond Molloy	256		
Conservative	Quentin Waite	228		
Liberal Democrats	Antony Davis	166		
Turnout		2,265	34.4	
