= 2018 Hastings Borough Council election =

Hastings Borough Council election

Results of the 2018 Hastings Borough Council election

The 2018 Hastings Borough Council election took place on 3 May 2018 to elect members of Hastings Borough Council in England. This was on the same day as other local elections. Every seat on the council was up for election following boundary changes. Labour retained their majority.

== Election result ==
Hastings local election result 2018
Party	Seats	Gains	Losses	Net gain/loss	Seats %	Votes %	Votes	+/−
Labour	24	1	1	0	75.0	48.6	11,896	
Conservative	8	1	1	0	25.0	31.3	7,673	
Green	0	0	0	0	0.0	10.8	2,642	
Liberal Democrats	0	0	0	0	0.0	8.5	2,090	
Democrats and Veterans	0	0	0	0	0.0	0.3	70	
UKIP	0	0	0	0	0.0	0.3	68	
For Britain	0	0	0	0	0.0	0.2	57	

== Ward results ==
=== Ashdown ===
Ashdown
Party	Candidate	Votes	%	±%
Conservative	Michael Edwards	745	55.8	
Conservative	Sorrell Marlow-Eastwood	662	49.6	
Labour	Lex Coan	426	31.9	
Labour	Steve Thorpe	417	31.2	
Green	Gabriel Carlyle	78	5.8	
Liberal Democrats	Lindsey Fellows	64	4.8	
Green	Paul Homer	63	4.7	
Liberal Democrats	Robert Wakeford	60	4.5	
Majority		236	17.7	
Turnout		1,335	33.71	
Conservative win (new seat)				
Conservative win (new seat)				

=== Baird ===
Baird
Party	Candidate	Votes	%	±%
Labour	Mike Turner	729	55.8	
Labour	Warren Davies	721	55.2	
Conservative	Terry Fawthrop	440	33.7	
Conservative	Peter Pragnell	385	29.5	
Green	Judy Scott	64	4.9	
Green	Chris Petts	56	4.3	
Liberal Democrats	Susan McDougall	35	2.7	
Liberal Democrats	John Faulkner	34	2.6	
Majority		281	21.5	
Turnout		1,306	34.71	
Labour win (new seat)				
Labour win (new seat)				

=== Braybrooke ===
Braybrooke
Party	Candidate	Votes	%	±%
Labour	Sue Beaney	1,101	64.5	
Labour	Dominic Sabetian	1,043	61.1	
Conservative	Mark Charlesworth	369	21.6	
Conservative	Janet Grigg	338	19.8	
Green	Sally Phillips	193	11.3	
Green	Gerald Turner	102	6.0	
Liberal Democrats	Jason Brooker	101	5.9	
Liberal Democrats	Michael Davies	88	5.2	
Majority		674	40.1	
Turnout		1,706	43.41	
Labour win (new seat)				
Labour win (new seat)				

=== Castle ===
Castle
Party	Candidate	Votes	%	±%
Labour	Judy Rogers	927	47.0	
Labour	Leah Levane	891	45.2	
Liberal Democrats	Nick Perry	668	33.9	
Liberal Democrats	Stewart Rayment	395	20.0	
Green	Charlotte Potter	219	11.1	
Conservative	Kevin Tomlin	218	11.1	
Conservative	John Sydes	204	10.3	
Green	Graeme Hampton	191	9.7	
Democrats and Veterans	Graeme White	70	3.5	
For Britain	Steven Ward	57	2.9	
Majority		223	11.3	
Turnout		1,972	42.51	
Labour win (new seat)				
Labour win (new seat)				

=== Central St Leonard's ===
Central St Leonard's
Party	Candidate	Votes	%	±%
Labour	Ruby Cox	839	53.2	
Labour	Trevor Webb	814	51.6	
Conservative	Sue Clarke	367	23.3	
Conservative	Graeme Williams	335	21.2	
Green	Sherry Clark	275	17.4	
Green	Milan Rai	187	11.9	
Liberal Democrats	Stephen Milton	104	6.6	
Liberal Democrats	Tony Seymour	100	6.3	
Majority		447	28.3	
Turnout		1,578	33.55	
Labour win (new seat)				
Labour win (new seat)				

=== Conquest ===
Conquest
Party	Candidate	Votes	%	±%
Conservative	John Rankin	782	52.2	
Conservative	Paul Foster	778	52.0	
Labour	Nicholas Davies	416	27.8	
Labour	Andy Ives	382	25.5	
Liberal Democrats	Ian Bunch	146	9.8	
Liberal Democrats	Margaret Burns	139	9.3	
Green	Ken Davis	82	5.5	
Green	Peter Bolwell	75	5.0	
Majority		362	24.2	
Turnout		1,497	39.53	
Conservative win (new seat)				
Conservative win (new seat)				

=== Gensing ===
Gensing
Party	Candidate	Votes	%	±%
Labour	Kim Forward	1,043	62.5	
Labour	Colin Fitzgerald	956	57.3	
Conservative	Craig Andrew	305	18.3	
Conservative	Catherine Burrows	285	17.1	
Green	Karen Simnett	191	11.5	
Green	Will Davis	167	10.0	
Liberal Democrats	Sue Tait	86	5.2	
Liberal Democrats	Lee Grant	73	4.4	
UKIP	Pamela Croft	68	4.1	
Majority		651	39.0	
Turnout		1,668	37.20	
Labour win (new seat)				
Labour win (new seat)				

=== Hollington ===
Hollington
Party	Candidate	Votes	%	±%
Labour	Paul Barnett	640	58.3	
Labour	Maya Evans	632	57.6	
Conservative	Nigel Barry	321	29.2	
Conservative	Joel De-Roe	285	26.0	
Green	Sarah Macbeth	63	5.7	
Green	Arkady Johns	54	4.9	
Liberal Democrats	Anne Gallop	44	4.0	
Liberal Democrats	Mike Lushington	36	3.3	
Majority		311	28.4	
Turnout		1,098	28.28	
Labour win (new seat)				
Labour win (new seat)				

=== Maze Hill ===
Maze Hill
Party	Candidate	Votes	%	±%
Conservative	Andy Patmore	745	49.1	
Conservative	Rob Lee	731	48.2	
Labour	Brekke Larsen	484	31.9	
Labour	Mike Southon	423	27.9	
Green	Beccy McCray	151	10.0	
Liberal Democrats	Paul Hunt	132	8.7	
Green	Chris Saunders	118	7.8	
Liberal Democrats	Chris Lewcock	116	7.7	
Majority		247	16.3	
Turnout		1,516	39.70	
Conservative win (new seat)				
Conservative win (new seat)				

=== Old Hastings ===
Old Hastings
Party	Candidate	Votes	%	±%
Labour	James Bacon	983	51.7	
Labour	Dany Louise	726	38.2	
Green	Julia Hilton	697	36.7	
Green	Andrea Needham	454	23.9	
Conservative	Alan Hay	420	22.1	
Conservative	Lisa Rankin	316	16.6	
Majority		29	1.5	
Turnout		1,900	47.43	
Labour win (new seat)				
Labour win (new seat)				

=== Ore ===
Ore
Party	Candidate	Votes	%	±%
Labour	Andrew Battley	631	46.3	
Labour	Heather Bishop	617	45.2	
Conservative	Oliver Devaux	531	38.9	
Conservative	James Dee	482	35.3	
Green	Jenny De Vuyst	118	8.7	
Green	Gary Rolfe	92	6.7	
Liberal Democrats	Katy Hunter-Burbridge	49	3.6	
Liberal Democrats	Kate Tudgay	40	2.9	
Majority		86	6.2	
Turnout		1,364	35.44	
Labour win (new seat)				
Labour win (new seat)				

=== Silverhill ===
Silverhill
Party	Candidate	Votes	%	±%
Labour	Nigel Sinden	781	49.0	
Labour	Margi O'Callaghan	725	45.5	
Conservative	James Hollis	587	36.8	
Conservative	Claire Hamill	579	36.3	
Green	Dave Carey-Stuart	112	7.0	
Green	Chris Saunders	88	5.5	
Liberal Democrats	Susan Stoodley	73	4.6	
Liberal Democrats	Jon Smalldon	68	4.3	
Majority		138	8.7	
Turnout		1,595	39.05	
Labour win (new seat)				
Labour win (new seat)				

=== St Helen's ===
St Helen's
Party	Candidate	Votes	%	±%
Labour	Andy Batsford	957	51.3	
Labour	Antonia Berelson	738	39.5	
Conservative	Martin Clarke	729	39.0	
Conservative	Matt Lynch	596	31.9	
Liberal Democrats	Bob Lloyd	154	8.2	
Green	Lucy Brennan	133	7.1	
Liberal Democrats	Emlyn Jones	109	5.8	
Green	Carol Prior	68	3.6	
Majority		9	0.5	
Turnout		1,867	48.03	
Labour win (new seat)				
Labour win (new seat)				

=== Tressell ===
Tressell
Party	Candidate	Votes	%	±%
Labour	Peter Chowney	659	59.5	
Labour	Tania Charman	628	56.7	
Conservative	Patrick Millar	217	19.6	
Conservative	Terry Keen	208	18.8	
Green	Catherine Taylor	130	11.7	
Green	Christopher Whitrow	77	7.0	
Liberal Democrats	Phil Broad	69	6.2	
Liberal Democrats	Oliver Maloney	42	3.8	
Majority		411	37.1	
Turnout		1,107	30.73	
Labour win (new seat)				
Labour win (new seat)				

=== West St Leonard's ===
West St Leonard's
Party	Candidate	Votes	%	±%
Conservative	Matthew Beaver	536	41.3	
Conservative	Karl Beaney	496	38.2	
Labour	Julia Price	440	33.9	
Labour	Anne Rouse	423	32.6	
Liberal Democrats	Eve Montgomery	277	21.3	
Liberal Democrats	Peter Clarke	263	20.2	
Green	Becca Horn	53	4.1	
Green	Mathew McDonnell	48	3.7	
Majority		56	4.3	
Turnout		1,299	35.40	
Conservative win (new seat)				
Conservative win (new seat)				

=== Wishing Tree ===
Wishing Tree
Party	Candidate	Votes	%	±%
Labour	Phil Scott	840	61.8	
Labour	Alan Roberts	743	54.6	
Conservative	Bexx Veness	361	26.5	
Conservative	John Waterfall	331	24.3	
Liberal Democrats	Nina Blanch	88	6.5	
Green	Abby Nicol	83	6.1	
Liberal Democrats	Tricia Kennelly	65	4.8	
Green	Thad Skews	63	4.6	
Majority		382	28.1	
Turnout		1,360	31.87	
Labour win (new seat)				
Labour win (new seat)				
