= 2026 Hastings Borough Council election =

2026 English local government election

- 7 May 2026

17 out of 32 seats to Hastings Borough Council (including 1 by-election) 17 seats needed for a majority
- Registered: 66,076
- Turnout: 29,294; 44.3%
	First party	Second party	Third party
Leader	Glenn Haffenden	None	Helen Kay
Party	Green	Reform	Labour
Last election	12 seats, 37.7%	0 seats, 1.4%	8 seats, 32.4%
Seats before	12	0	9
Seats won	10	6	0
Seats after	19	6	4
Seat change	▲7	▲6	▼5
Popular vote	12,913	7,901	4,993
Percentage	41.7%	25.5%	16.1%
Swing	▲4.0%	▲24.1%	▼16.3%
	Fourth party	Fifth party
Leader	Mike Edwards (defeated)
Party	Conservative	Independent
Last election	5 seats, 19.1%	7
Seats before	5	6 (Note: It has been reported that Paul Barnett, Andy Batsford, John Cannan, Nigel Sinden, Mike Turner and Simon Willis have joined Your Party. However, Hastings Borough Council lists them as independents, comprising the Hastings Independent Group.)
Seats won	0	1
Seats after	2	1
Seat change	▼3	▼5
Popular vote	3,116	1,564
Percentage	10.1%	5.1%
Swing	▼9.0%	▼2.3%
- Winner of each seat at the 2026 Hastings Borough Council election.
Leader before election
Glenn Haffenden
Green
No overall control (Note: Green–Independent coalition.)
Leader after election
Glenn Haffenden
Green

The 2026 Hastings Borough Council election took place on 7 May 2026 to elect members of Hastings Borough Council in East Sussex, England. This was on the same day as other local elections.

Prior to the election, the council was under no overall control. The Greens were the largest party and ran the council with the support of independent councillors. At this election, the Greens won an additional seven seats, giving them an overall majority on the council for the first time.

== Summary ==
=== Council composition ===
After 2024 election		Before 2026 election	
Party	Seats	Party	Seats
Green	12	Green	12
Labour	8	Labour	9
Conservative	5	Conservative	5
Independent	7	Independent	6

Changes 2024–2026:

- July 2024: John Rankin (Independent, elected as Conservative) joins Labour

=== Election result ===
2026 Hastings Borough Council election
Party	This election				Full council			This election		
Party	Candidates	Seats	Net	Seats %	Other	Total	Total %	Votes	Votes %	+/−
Green	{{{candidates}}}	10	▲7	58.8	9	19	59.4	12,913	41.7	+4.0
Reform	{{{candidates}}}	6	▲6	35.3	0	6	18.8	7,901	25.5	+24.1
Labour	{{{candidates}}}	0	▼5	0.0	4	4	12.5	4,993	16.1	–16.3
Conservative	{{{candidates}}}	0	▼3	0.0	2	2	6.3	3,116	10.1	–9.0
Independent	{{{candidates}}}	1	▼5	5.9	0	1	3.1	1,564	5.1	–2.3
Liberal Democrats	{{{candidates}}}	0	Steady	0.0	0	0	0.0	440	1.4	–0.6
Libertarian	{{{candidates}}}	0	Steady	0.0	0	0	0.0	18	0.1	N/A

== Incumbents ==
Ward	Incumbent councillor	Party	Re-standing
Ashdown	Mike Edwards	Conservative	Yes
Baird	Mike Turner (Note: Originally elected as Labour, but later defected to Your Party, although the council's website lists them as an independent.)	Independent	Yes
Braybrooke	Margi O'Callaghan	Labour	No
Castle	Judy Rogers	Labour	Yes
Central St Leonards	Tony Collins	Green	No
Conquest	John Rankin (Note: Originally elected as a Conservative, but later left the party to sit as an independent and subsequently joined Labour.)	Labour	Yes (Note: Standing in Wishing Tree ward.)
Gensing	Amanda Jobson	Green	Yes
Hollington	Paul Barnett	Independent	No
Maze Hill	Andy Patmore	Conservative	No
Old Hastings	James Bacon	Labour	Yes
Ore	Simon Willis	Independent	No
Silverhill	Nigel Sinden	Independent	Yes
St Helens	Andy Batsford	Independent	Yes
Tressell	Glenn Haffenden	Green	Yes
West St Leonards	Matthew Beaver	Conservative	Yes
Wishing Tree	John Cannan	Independent	Yes

== Ward results ==
=== Ashdown ===
Ashdown
Party	Candidate	Votes	%	±%
Reform	Daniel Kendrick	628	37.1	+27.6
Green	Marie Parfitt	407	24.0	+10.3
Conservative	Michael Edwards*	363	21.4	–17.1
Labour Co-op	Louise Chantal	202	11.9	–20.7
Liberal Democrats	Robert Wakeford	95	5.6	–0.1
Majority		221	13.1	N/A
Turnout		1,695	40.4	
Registered electors		4,193		
Reform gain from Conservative		Swing	▲8.7	

=== Baird ===
Baird
Party	Candidate	Votes	%	±%
Green	Will Rumfitt	492	31.9	+2.9
Reform	Jack McCree	438	28.4	N/A
Independent	Mike Turner*	335	21.7	+0.1
Conservative	Liam Atkins	151	9.8	–13.6
Labour	Rick Dillon	128	8.3	–15.1
Majority		54	3.5	–2.1
Turnout		1,544	39.9	
Registered electors		3,874		
Green gain from Independent				

=== Braybrooke ===
Braybrooke
Party	Candidate	Votes	%	±%
Green	Archie Lauchlan	1,232	59.0	+2.7
Labour	Josh Matthews	364	17.4	–17.2
Reform	Yoong Kam	353	16.9	N/A
Conservative	John Waterfall	138	6.6	–2.5
Majority		868	41.6	+19.9
Turnout		2,087	51.9	
Registered electors		4,023		
Green gain from Labour		Swing	▲10.0	

=== Castle ===
Castle
Party	Candidate	Votes	%	±%
Green	Steph Fawbert	1,404	63.9	+8.2
Reform	Graeme White	336	15.3	N/A
Labour	Judy Rogers*	333	15.2	–20.0
Conservative	Charlie Cooke	125	5.7	–3.4
Majority		1,068	48.6	+28.1
Turnout		2,212	44.7	
Registered electors		4,949		
Green gain from Labour				

=== Central St Leonards ===
Central St Leonards
Party	Candidate	Votes	%	±%
Green	Solly Solamito	1,303	61.1	+15.7
Reform	Alex Dudley	378	17.7	N/A
Labour Co-op	Trevor Redmond	344	16.1	–13.8
Conservative	Caroline Kerswell	107	5.0	–3.6
Majority		925	43.4	+29.9
Turnout		2,132	40.7	
Registered electors		5,238		
Green hold				

=== Conquest ===
Conquest
Party	Candidate	Votes	%	±%
Reform	Rob Drew	607	34.3	N/A
Green	Ian Gillam	444	25.1	+14.3
Conservative	Roger Streeten	398	22.5	–14.8
Labour	Hugh Nicholson	235	13.3	–16.0
Liberal Democrats	Stewart Rayment	87	4.9	–3.2
Majority		163	9.2	N/A
Turnout		1,777	44.6	
Registered electors		3,982		
Reform gain from Labour				

=== Gensing ===
Gensing
Party	Candidate	Votes	%	±%
Green	Amanda Jobson*	1,436	66.2	+8.4
Reform	Jet Rankin	365	16.8	N/A
Labour	John Williams	274	12.6	–19.8
Conservative	Shane Atkins	95	4.4	–5.4
Majority		1,071	49.4	+24.0
Turnout		2,183	47.1	
Registered electors		4,636		
Green hold				

=== Hollington ===
Hollington
Party	Candidate	Votes	%	±%
Reform	Will Chapman	484	38.0	N/A
Labour Co-op	Angela Harris	261	20.5	–16.0
Independent	Andrea Cowhig	197	15.5	–17.0
Green	Justin Wynne	196	15.4	+8.6
Conservative	Matthew Ainsworth	135	10.6	–13.5
Majority		223	17.5	N/A
Turnout		1,278	33.4	
Registered electors		3,828		
Reform gain from Independent				

=== Maze Hill ===
Maze Hill
Party	Candidate	Votes	%	±%
Green	Karen Simnett	969	48.4	+10.5
Reform	Rosie Murphy	499	24.9	+19.6
Conservative	Rob Cooke	268	13.4	–11.0
Labour Co-op	Tim Shand	223	11.1	–14.4
Liberal Democrats	Lee Grant	44	2.2	–0.4
Majority		470	23.5	+11.1
Turnout		2,003	52.3	
Registered electors		3,829		
Green gain from Conservative		Swing	▼4.6	

=== Old Hastings ===
Old Hastings
Party	Candidate	Votes	%	±%
Green	Mike Frith	1,064	48.0	–12.8
Labour	James Bacon*	640	28.9	–0.1
Reform	Steve Foot	387	17.5	N/A
Conservative	Ray Molloy	124	5.6	–4.6
Majority		424	19.1	–12.7
Turnout		2,219	57.1	
Registered electors		3,886		
Green gain from Labour		Swing	▼6.4	

=== Ore ===
Ore
Party	Candidate	Votes	%	±%
Green	Clem McCulloch	874	51.6	–6.1
Reform	Wojciech Duczmal	471	27.8	N/A
Labour Co-op	Kim Forward	167	9.9	–14.8
Conservative	Brett McClean	113	6.7	–8.1
Independent	Vicky Wilson	70	4.1	N/A
Majority		403	23.8	–9.2
Turnout		1,708	43.3	
Registered electors		3,945		
Green gain from Independent				

=== Silverhill ===
Silverhill
Party	Candidate	Votes	%	±%
Green	Dulcie Reynolds	610	32.0	+10.7
Reform	Ian Moore	492	25.8	+16.5
Labour Co-op	Margi O'Callaghan	327	17.1	–23.8
Independent	Nigel Sinden*	265	13.9	N/A
Conservative	Craig Andrew	213	11.2	–13.8
Majority		118	6.2	N/A
Turnout		1,917	45.7	
Registered electors		4,195		
Green gain from Independent		Swing	▼2.9	

=== St Helens ===
St Helens (2 seats due to by-election)
Party	Candidate	Votes	%	±%
Reform	Peter Clarke	572	30.1	N/A
Independent	Andy Batsford*	544	28.6	+10.6
Green	Shaun Dowling	490	25.8	+8.2
Green	Jessica Townsend	462	24.3	+6.7
Reform	Hazel Vanbergen	460	24.2	N/A
Labour	Barney Green	320	16.8	–14.1
Labour Co-op	Helen Martin	311	16.4	–14.5
Conservative	Howard Martin	249	13.1	–14.9
Conservative	Stephen Butterton	229	12.0	–16.0
Liberal Democrats	Bob Lloyd	164	8.6	+3.0
Turnout		~1,901		
Reform gain from Labour				
Independent hold				

Andy Batsford was elected for the Labour Party in 2022.

=== Tressell ===
Tressell
Party	Candidate	Votes	%	±%
Green	Glenn Haffenden*	921	61.0	–4.6
Reform	Ricky Hodges	409	27.1	N/A
Labour	Ingrid Allan	129	8.5	–17.5
Conservative	Shelley Lee	51	3.4	–5.0
Majority		512	33.9	–5.7
Turnout		1,514	41.4	
Registered electors		3,660		
Green hold				

=== West St Leonards ===
West St Leonards
Party	Candidate	Votes	%	±%
Reform	Derek Lawrence	506	33.9	N/A
Labour	Anna Sabin	370	24.8	–13.9
Green	Emma Joliffe	346	23.2	+7.2
Conservative	Matthew Beaver*	220	14.7	–20.6
Liberal Democrats	Eve Montgomery	50	3.4	–0.5
Majority		136	9.1	N/A
Turnout		1,508	39.5	
Registered electors		3,818		
Reform gain from Conservative				

=== Wishing Tree ===
Wishing Tree
Party	Candidate	Votes	%	±%
Reform	Doreena Ross	516	35.5	N/A
Labour	John Rankin*	365	25.1	–26.3
Green	Melanie Kavanagh	263	18.1	+6.0
Independent	John Cannan*	153	10.5	–7.6
Conservative	Wendy Cooke	137	9.4	–9.0
Libertarian	Mal McDermott	18	1.2	N/A
Majority		151	10.4	N/A
Turnout		1,457	34.9	
Registered electors		4,179		
Reform gain from Independent				
