= 1998 Hastings Borough Council election =

1998 UK local government election

The 1998 Hastings Borough Council election took place on 7 May 1998 to elect members of Hastings Borough Council in East Sussex, England. One third of the council was up for election and the Labour Party gained overall control of the council from the Liberal Democrats.

After the election, the composition of the council was:

- Labour 18
- Liberal Democrat 13
- Conservative 1

== Election result ==
The Labour victories saw them gain a majority on Hastings Borough Council for the first time.

Hastings local election result 1998
Party	Seats	Gains	Losses	Net gain/loss	Seats %	Votes %	Votes	+/−
Labour	10			+3	76.9			
Liberal Democrats	2			-4	15.4			
Conservative	1			+1	7.7			
