= 2000 Hastings Borough Council election =

2000 UK local government election

Elections to Hastings Borough Council were held on 4 May 2000. One third of the council was up for election and the Labour Party kept overall control of the council.

After the election, the composition of the council was:

- Labour 18
- Liberal Democrat 8
- Conservative 6

== Election result ==
Hastings local election result 2000
Party	Seats	Gains	Losses	Net gain/loss	Seats %	Votes %	Votes	+/−
Labour	4			-1	36.4			
Conservative	4			+3	36.4			
Liberal Democrats	3			-2	27.3			
