= 2004 Hastings Borough Council election =

2004 UK local government election

Map of the results of the 2004 Hastings council election. Conservatives in blue, Labour in red and Liberal Democrats in yellow.

Elections to Hastings Borough Council were held on 10 June 2004. Half of the council was up for election and the Labour Party lost overall control of the council to no overall control. Overall turnout was 34.5%.

After the election, the composition of the council was:

- Labour 15
- Conservative 13
- Liberal Democrat 4

== Election result ==
Hastings local election result 2004
Party	Seats	Gains	Losses	Net gain/loss	Seats %	Votes %	Votes	+/−
Conservative	8	3	0	+3	50.0	37.0	7,972	+4.0
Labour	5	0	6	-6	31.3	33.0	7,107	-12.7
Liberal Democrats	3	3	0	+3	18.8	23.6	5,093	+6.0
Green	0	0	0	0	0.0	4.3	930	+1.5
UKIP	0	0	0	0	0.0	2.1	449	+2.1

== Ward results ==
Ashdown
Party	Candidate	Votes	%	±%
Conservative	Cooke	800	56.0	
Liberal Democrats	Kennelly	325	22.8	
Labour	Wilde	303	21.2	
Majority		475	33.2	
Turnout		1,428	35.5	+3.0
Conservative hold		Swing		

Baird
Party	Candidate	Votes	%	±%
Conservative	Vallery	572	45.8	
Labour	Castro	436	34.9	
Liberal Democrats	Coffey	241	19.3	
Majority		136	10.9	
Turnout		1,249	33.6	+6.6
Conservative gain from Labour		Swing		

Braybrooke
Party	Candidate	Votes	%	±%
Labour	Sabetian	748	49.5	
Conservative	Prince	437	28.9	
Liberal Democrats	Saxby	184	12.2	
Green	Phillips	143	9.5	
Majority		311	20.6	
Turnout		1,512	40.6	+2.5
Labour hold		Swing		

Castle
Party	Candidate	Votes	%	±%
Liberal Democrats	Smith	576	40.6	
Labour	Jackson	431	30.4	
Conservative	Willard	223	15.7	
Green	Homewood	187	13.2	
Majority		145	10.2	
Turnout		1,417	32.3	−0.2
Liberal Democrats gain from Labour		Swing		

Central St Leonards
Party	Candidate	Votes	%	±%
Labour	Webb	469	39.7	
Liberal Democrats	Modlinger	423	35.8	
Conservative	Evans	288	24.4	
Majority		46	3.9	
Turnout		1,180	27.3	−3.6
Labour hold		Swing		

Conquest
Party	Candidate	Votes	%	±%
Conservative	Pragnell	837	52.9	
Liberal Democrats	Dormer	385	24.3	
Labour	Worsley	283	17.9	
Green	Phillips	78	4.9	
Majority		452	28.6	
Turnout		1,583	40.6	+5.0
Conservative hold		Swing		

Gensing
Party	Candidate	Votes	%	±%
Liberal Democrats	Bond	433	33.0	
Labour	Rushbrook	421	32.0	
Conservative	Lock	320	24.4	
Green	Carey-Stuart	140	10.7	
Majority		12	1.0	
Turnout		1,314	30.1	+2.8
Liberal Democrats gain from Labour		Swing		

Hollington
Party	Candidate	Votes	%	±%
Labour	Soan	443	44.3	
Conservative	Madlani	275	27.5	
Liberal Democrats	Campbell	177	17.7	
Green	Young	104	10.4	
Majority		168	16.8	
Turnout		999	24.9	+2.8
Labour hold		Swing		

Maze Hill
Party	Candidate	Votes	%	±%
Conservative	Charlesworth	687	48.1	
Liberal Democrats	Russell	261	18.3	
Labour	Maloney	250	17.5	
UKIP	Manning	229	16.0	
Majority		426	29.8	
Turnout		1,427	36.3	+2.9
Conservative hold		Swing		

Old Hastings
Party	Candidate	Votes	%	±%
Liberal Democrats	Stevens	662	36.3	
Labour	Kitson	548	30.1	
Conservative	Keen	456	25.0	
Green	Robertson	156	8.6	
Majority		114	6.2	
Turnout		1,822	42.8	+3.5
Liberal Democrats gain from Labour		Swing		

Ore
Party	Candidate	Votes	%	±%
Conservative	Bird	543	46.3	
Labour	Chowney	392	33.4	
Liberal Democrats	Edmonds	239	20.4	
Majority		151	12.9	
Turnout		1,174	32.4	+5.4
Conservative gain from Labour		Swing		

Silverhill
Party	Candidate	Votes	%	±%
Conservative	Lambrechs	545	40.6	
Labour	Roberts	430	32.1	
Liberal Democrats	Third	244	18.2	
Green	Medhurst	122	9.1	
Majority		115	8.5	
Turnout		1,341	39.2	+3.9
Conservative gain from Labour		Swing		

St Helens
Party	Candidate	Votes	%	±%
Conservative	Lock	929	50.7	
Labour	Rycroft	640	34.9	
Liberal Democrats	Alders	264	14.4	
Majority		289	15.8	
Turnout		1,833	45.6	+4.3
Conservative hold		Swing		

Tressell
Party	Candidate	Votes	%	±%
Labour	McDonnell	358	43.3	
Conservative	Cooke	239	28.9	
Liberal Democrats	Ayres	230	27.8	
Majority		119	14.4	
Turnout		827	24.7	+1.5
Labour hold		Swing		

West St. Leonards
Party	Candidate	Votes	%	±%
Conservative	Beaver	443	38.2	
Liberal Democrats	Wise	255	22.0	
Labour	Wood	243	20.9	
UKIP	Powell	219	18.9	
Majority		188	16.2	
Turnout		1,160	31.2	+0.1
Conservative hold		Swing		

Wishing Tree
Party	Candidate	Votes	%	±%
Labour	Scott	712	55.5	
Conservative	Molloy	378	29.4	
Liberal Democrats	Pickard	194	15.1	
Majority		334	26.1	
Turnout		1,284	35.6	+1.2
Labour hold		Swing		
