= 2008 Hastings Borough Council election =

2008 UK local government election

Map of the results of the 2008 Hastings council election. Conservatives in blue, Labour in red and Liberal Democrats in yellow.

The 2008 Hastings Borough Council election took place on 1 May 2008 to elect members of Hastings Borough Council in East Sussex, England. Half of the council was up for election and the council stayed under no overall control.

After the election, the composition of the council was:

- Conservative 15
- Labour 13
- Liberal Democrat 3
- Independent 1

== Election result ==
Overall turnout in the election was 36.5%.

Hastings local election result 2008
Party	Seats	Gains	Losses	Net gain/loss	Seats %	Votes %	Votes	+/−
Conservative	8	1	0	+1	50.0	42.5	9,530	+3.3%
Labour	7	2	1	+1	43.8	34.7	7,786	+1.1%
Liberal Democrats	1	0	2	-2	6.3	19.0	4,266	-3.4%
BNP	0	0	0	0	0	2.1	472	+0.0%
Independent	0	0	0	0	0	1.2	268	+1.2%
UKIP	0	0	0	0	0	0.5	120	+0.5%

== Ward results ==
Ashdown
Party	Candidate	Votes	%	±%
Conservative	Rob Cooke	983	64.4	+3.4
Labour	John Leahy	288	18.9	−5.4
Liberal Democrats	Alan Roscoe	255	16.7	+2.0
Majority		695	45.5	+8.8
Turnout		1,526	34.7	+0.2
Conservative hold		Swing		

Baird
Party	Candidate	Votes	%	±%
Conservative	Richard Vallery	683	51.0	+4.4
Labour	Georgiana De Lussy	509	38.0	−0.1
Liberal Democrats	Wilfrid Pickard	148	11.0	−4.3
Majority		174	13.0	+4.5
Turnout		1,340	37.6	+0.5
Conservative hold		Swing		

Braybrooke
Party	Candidate	Votes	%	±%
Labour	Dominic Sabetian	794	53.2	+0.9
Conservative	Michelle Green	508	34.0	+3.2
Liberal Democrats	Oliver Maloney	191	12.8	−4.0
Majority		286	19.2	−2.3
Turnout		1,493	41.2	+0.7
Labour hold		Swing		

Castle
Party	Candidate	Votes	%	±%
Labour	Paul Barlow	718	46.5	+14.4
Liberal Democrats	Paul Smith	286	18.5	−20.3
Conservative	Lee Allane	246	15.9	−0.9
Independent	Andy Dumas	168	10.9	+10.9
BNP	Mick Turner	83	5.4	+5.4
Independent	Bob Stewart	43	2.8	+2.8
Majority		432	28.0	
Turnout		1,544	36.7	+0.5
Labour gain from Liberal Democrats		Swing		

Central St. Leonards
Party	Candidate	Votes	%	±%
Labour	Trevor Webb	568	46.5	+2.0
Conservative	Simon Corello	327	26.8	−0.8
Liberal Democrats	Brett McLean	188	15.4	−12.4
BNP	Frank Swaine	81	6.6	+6.6
Independent	David Knight	57	4.7	+4.7
Majority		241	19.7	+3.0
Turnout		1,221	31.4	−1.7
Labour hold		Swing		

Conquest
Party	Candidate	Votes	%	±%
Conservative	Peter Pragnell	835	48.9	−11.9
Liberal Democrats	Margaret Williams	521	30.5	+10.4
Labour	Nigel Sinden	231	13.5	−5.6
UKIP	Diane Granger	120	7.0	+7.0
Majority		314	18.4	−22.3
Turnout		1,707	45.4	+5.2
Conservative hold		Swing		

Gensing
Party	Candidate	Votes	%	±%
Labour	Kim Forward	526	37.1	+10.9
Liberal Democrats	Vivienne Bond	457	32.2	+12.4
Conservative	Cath Burrows	435	30.7	−15.5
Majority		69	4.9	
Turnout		1,418	36.7	−5.5
Labour gain from Liberal Democrats		Swing		

Hollington
Party	Candidate	Votes	%	±%
Labour	Terry Soan	427	41.1	−3.9
Conservative	Amanda Charlesworth	324	31.2	+11.3
BNP	Victoria Britton	161	15.5	−2.5
Liberal Democrats	Nathan Lauder	128	12.3	+0.5
Majority		103	9.9	−15.2
Turnout		1,040	25.1	−4.3
Labour hold		Swing		

Maze Hill
Party	Candidate	Votes	%	±%
Conservative	Maureen Charlesworth	868	62.9	+1.8
Labour	Ken Maitland	309	22.4	+2.9
Liberal Democrats	Colin Dormer	203	14.7	−4.7
Majority		559	40.5	−1.1
Turnout		1,380	34.7	−1.9
Conservative hold		Swing		

Old Hastings
Party	Candidate	Votes	%	±%
Liberal Democrats	Richard Stevens	634	35.0	−1.6
Conservative	Stuart Padget	633	34.9	+4.5
Labour	Kate Francis	547	30.2	−2.8
Majority		1	0.1	−3.5
Turnout		1,814	42.8	+0.2
Liberal Democrats hold		Swing		

Ore
Party	Candidate	Votes	%	±%
Conservative	Anne Bird	626	50.3	+11.6
Labour	Richard Street	434	34.9	+4.1
Liberal Democrats	Anne Scott	184	14.8	−15.7
Majority		192	15.4	+7.5
Turnout		1,244	34.3	−2.0
Conservative hold		Swing		

Silverhill
Party	Candidate	Votes	%	±%
Conservative	Matthew Lock	628	47.3	+4.1
Labour	Bruce Dowling	520	39.1	+4.4
Liberal Democrats	Chris Beaumont	181	13.6	−8.5
Majority		108	8.1	−0.4
Turnout		1,329	33.3	−6.0
Conservative gain from Labour		Swing		

St Helens
Party	Candidate	Votes	%	±%
Conservative	Matthew Lock	994	58.5	+6.3
Labour	Jonathan Lee	412	24.2	−3.1
Liberal Democrats	Paul Willard	293	17.2	−3.3
Majority		582	34.3	+9.4
Turnout		1,699	50.1	+5.9
Conservative hold		Swing		

Tressell
Party	Candidate	Votes	%	±%
Labour	Peter Chowney	372	37.0	
Conservative	Kate Walsgrove	279	27.7	
Liberal Democrats	Evelyn Modlinger	208	20.7	
BNP	Nick Prince	147	14.6	
Majority		93	9.3	
Turnout		1,006	29.5	−5.1
Labour hold		Swing		

West St Leonards
Party	Candidate	Votes	%	±%
Conservative	Matthew Beaver	663	48.5	+5.5
Labour	Mike Turner	517	37.8	+3.6
Liberal Democrats	Tricia Kennelly	186	13.6	−9.2
Majority		146	10.7	+1.9
Turnout		1,366	35.8	−3.4
Conservative hold		Swing		

Wishing Tree
Party	Candidate	Votes	%	±%
Labour	Phil Scott	614	46.7	+0.4
Conservative	Jason Perry	498	37.9	+10.2
Liberal Democrats	Norman Wilcock	203	15.4	−10.6
Majority		116	8.8	−9.8
Turnout		1,315	36.3	+0.8
Labour hold		Swing		
