= 2021 Hastings Borough Council election =

2021 UK local government election

Map showing the results of the 2021 Hastings Borough Council election

The 2021 Hastings Borough Council election took place on 6 May 2021 to elect members of Hastings Borough Council in England. This was on the same day as other local elections.

== Results summary ==
2021 Hastings Borough Council election
Party	This election			Full council			This election		
Party	Seats	Net	Seats %	Other	Total	Total %	Votes	Votes %	+/−
Labour	7	▼5	43.8	12	19	59.4	10,102	37.6	-11.0
Conservative	8	▲4	50.0	4	12	37.5	10,920	40.7	+9.4
Green	1	▲1	6.3	0	1	3.1	4,389	16.3	+5.5
Liberal Democrats	0	Steady	0.0	0	0	0.0	1,439	5.4	-3.1

== Ward results ==
=== Ashdown ===
Ashdown
Party	Candidate	Votes	%	±%
Conservative	Sorrell Marlow-Eastwood	792	61.0	+11.4
Labour	Liam Crowter	282	21.7	−10.2
Green	Christopher Saunders	117	9.0	+3.2
Liberal Democrats	Martin Griffiths	108	8.3	+3.5
Majority		510	39.3	
Turnout		1,299	32.2	
Conservative hold		Swing		

=== Baird ===
Baird
Party	Candidate	Votes	%	±%
Conservative	Rob Cooke	575	48.5	+14.8
Labour	Warren Davies	503	42.4	−12.8
Green	Daniel Hope	73	6.2	+1.3
Liberal Democrats	Robert Wakeford	34	2.9	+0.2
Majority		72	6.1	N/A
Turnout		1,185	31.1	
Conservative gain from Labour		Swing		

=== Braybrooke ===
Braybrooke
Party	Candidate	Votes	%	±%
Labour	Sabina Arthur	739	45.8	−15.3
Conservative	Shelley Bland	499	31.0	+9.4
Green	Sally Phillips	292	18.1	+6.8
Liberal Democrats	Lee Grant	82	5.1	−0.8
Majority		240	14.8	
Turnout		1,612	40.2	
Labour hold		Swing		

=== Castle ===
Castle
Party	Candidate	Votes	%	±%
Labour Co-op	Claire Carr	733	43.8	−1.4
Green	Andrea Needham	418	25.0	+13.9
Conservative	John Sydes	372	22.2	+11.9
Liberal Democrats	Katy Hunter-Burbridge	150	9.0	−24.9
Majority		315	18.8	
Turnout		1,673	34.0	
Labour Co-op hold		Swing		

=== Central St Leonards ===
Central St Leonards
Party	Candidate	Votes	%	±%
Labour	Trevor Webb	704	43.7	−7.9
Green	Marie Jones	406	25.2	+7.8
Conservative	Sue Clarke	392	24.3	+1.0
Liberal Democrats	Stephen Milton	110	6.8	+0.2
Majority		298	18.5	
Turnout		1,612	32.1	
Labour hold		Swing		

=== Conquest ===
Conquest
Party	Candidate	Votes	%	±%
Conservative	Paul Foster	851	61.3	+9.3
Labour	Brian Bostock	322	23.2	−4.6
Liberal Democrats	Veronica Chessell	113	8.1	−1.7
Green	Gabriel Carlyle	103	7.4	+1.9
Majority		529	38.1	
Turnout		1,389	37.1	
Conservative hold		Swing		

=== Gensing ===
Gensing
Party	Candidate	Votes	%	±%
Labour	Heather Bishop	740	45.8	−11.5
Green	Kenneth Davis	408	25.3	+13.8
Conservative	John Waterfall	369	22.8	+4.5
Liberal Democrats	Susan Stoodley	98	6.1	+0.9
Majority		332	20.5	
Turnout		1,615	35.0	
Labour hold		Swing		

=== Hollington ===
Hollington
Party	Candidate	Votes	%	±%
Labour	Maya Evans	560	53.6	−4.0
Conservative	Terry Fawthrop	381	36.5	+7.3
Green	Beccy McCray	71	6.8	+1.1
Liberal Democrats	Anne Gallop	33	3.2	−0.8
Majority		179	17.1	
Turnout		1,045	27.4	
Labour hold		Swing		

=== Maze Hill ===
Maze Hill
Party	Candidate	Votes	%	±%
Conservative	Graeme Williams	781	51.7	+3.5
Labour	Steve Thorpe	422	27.9	−4.0
Green	Samuel Hefferman	232	15.4	+5.4
Liberal Democrats	Jonathon Stoodley	75	5.0	−3.7
Majority		359	23.8	
Turnout		1,510	39.8	
Conservative hold		Swing		

=== Old Hastings ===
Old Hastings
Party	Candidate	Votes	%	±%
Green	Julia Hilton	1,032	52.4	+15.7
Labour	Anna Sabin	500	25.4	−12.8
Conservative	Stuart Murphy	399	20.3	−1.8
Liberal Democrats	Gene Saunders	38	1.9	New
Majority		532	27.0	N/A
Turnout		1,969	48.9	
Green gain from Labour		Swing		

=== Ore ===
Ore
Party	Candidate	Votes	%	±%
Conservative	Alan Hay	573	44.5	+5.6
Labour	Anime Abdallah	471	36.6	−8.6
Green	Gary Rolfe	205	15.9	+9.2
Liberal Democrats	Jon Smalldon	38	3.0	−0.6
Majority		102	7.9	N/A
Turnout		1,287	32.9	
Conservative gain from Labour		Swing		

=== Silverhill ===
Silverhill
Party	Candidate	Votes	%	±%
Conservative	Lucian Fernando	682	43.2	+6.4
Labour	Margi O'Callaghan	612	38.7	−6.8
Green	Dave Carey-Stuart	201	12.7	+5.7
Liberal Democrats	Terry Keen	85	5.4	+0.8
Majority		70	4.5	N/A
Turnout		1,580	37.7	
Conservative gain from Labour		Swing		

=== St Helens ===
St Helens
Party	Candidate	Votes	%	±%
Conservative	Peter Pragnell	889	49.7	+10.7
Labour	Antonia Berelson	600	33.5	−6.0
Green	Lucy Brennan	199	11.1	+4.0
Liberal Democrats	Bob Lloyd	102	5.7	−2.5
Majority		289	16.2	N/A
Turnout		1,790	46.1	
Conservative gain from Labour		Swing		

=== Tressell ===
Tressell
Party	Candidate	Votes	%	±%
Labour	Ali Roark	455	45.0	−11.7
Conservative	Fiona Archbold	317	31.3	+11.7
Green	Holly Rose	196	19.4	+7.7
Liberal Democrats	Jim Deasley	44	4.3	−1.9
Majority		138	13.7	
Turnout		1,012	27.4	
Labour hold		Swing		

=== West St Leonards ===
West St Leonards
Party	Candidate	Votes	%	±%
Conservative	Karl Beaney	661	56.7	+18.5
Labour	John Cannan	279	23.9	−10.0
Green	Jane Packman	119	10.2	+6.1
Liberal Democrats	Stewart Rayment	107	9.2	−12.1
Majority		382	32.8	
Turnout		1,166	32.4	
Conservative hold		Swing		

=== Wishing Tree ===
Wishing Tree
Party	Candidate	Votes	%	±%
Labour	Alan Roberts	608	46.0	−8.6
Conservative	Martin Clarke	540	40.8	+14.3
Green	Christine Saunders	112	8.5	+2.4
Liberal Democrats	Emlyn Jones	63	4.8	−1.7
Majority		68	5.2	
Turnout		1,323	30.7	
Labour hold		Swing		
