= 2006 Hastings Borough Council election =

2006 UK local government election

Map of the results of the 2006 Hastings council election. Conservatives in blue, Labour in red and Liberal Democrats in yellow.

Elections to Hastings Borough Council were held on 4 May 2006. Half of the council was up for election and the Conservative Party gained overall control of the council from no overall control. Overall turnout was 37.6%. After the election, the composition of the council was:

- Conservative 17
- Labour 10
- Liberal Democrat 5

== Election result ==
Hastings local election result 2006
Party	Seats	Gains	Losses	Net gain/loss	Seats %	Votes %	Votes	+/−
Conservative	9	4	0	+4	52.9	39.2	8,967	+2.2%
Labour	6	0	4	-4	35.3	33.6	7,673	+0.6%
Liberal Democrats	2	1	1	0	11.8	22.4	5,128	-1.2%
Green	0	0	0	0	0	2.7	606	-1.6%
BNP	0	0	0	0	0	2.1	485	+2.1%

== Ward results ==
Ashdown
Party	Candidate	Votes	%	±%
Conservative	John Wilson	869	61.0	+5.0
Labour	Ronald Rushbrook	346	24.3	+3.1
Liberal Democrats	Wilfrid Pickard	209	14.7	−8.1
Majority		523	36.7	+3.5
Turnout		1,424	34.5	−1.0
Conservative hold		Swing		

Baird
Party	Candidate	Votes	%	±%
Conservative	Terrence Fawthrop	583	46.6	+0.8
Labour	Bob Hart	477	38.1	+3.2
Liberal Democrats	Oliver Maloney	192	15.3	−4.0
Majority		106	8.5	−2.4
Turnout		1,252	37.1	+3.5
Conservative gain from Labour		Swing		

Braybrooke
Party	Candidate	Votes	%	±%
Labour	Godfrey Daniel	747	52.3	+2.8
Conservative	Dennis Williams	440	30.8	+1.9
Liberal Democrats	Christine Booth	240	16.8	+4.6
Majority		307	21.5	+0.9
Turnout		1,427	40.5	−0.1
Labour hold		Swing		

Castle
Party	Candidate	Votes	%	±%
Liberal Democrats	Edward Armstrong	545	38.8	−1.8
Labour	Melanie Rycroft	450	32.1	+1.7
Conservative	Theresa Lock	236	16.8	+1.1
Green	Mary Robertson	173	12.3	−0.9
Majority		95	6.7	−3.5
Turnout		1,404	36.2	+3.9
Liberal Democrats hold		Swing		

Central St Leonards
Party	Candidate	Votes	%	±%
Labour	Jeremy Birch	543	44.5	+4.8
Liberal Democrats	Evelyn Modlinger	339	27.8	−8.0
Conservative	Paul Egmond	337	27.6	+3.2
Majority		204	16.7	+12.8
Turnout		1,219	33.1	+5.8
Labour hold		Swing		

Conquest
Party	Candidate	Votes	%	±%
Conservative	Gladys Martin	913	60.8	+7.9
Liberal Democrats	Alan Roscoe	302	20.1	−4.2
Labour	Emily Westley	287	19.1	+1.2
Majority		611	40.7	+12.1
Turnout		1,502	40.2	−0.4
Conservative hold		Swing		

Gensing
Party	Candidate	Votes	%	±%
Conservative	Dan Poulter	750	47.2	+22.8
Labour	Andrew Cartwright	417	26.2	−5.8
Liberal Democrats	Nathan Lauder	315	19.8	−13.2
Green	David Carey-Stuart	108	6.8	−3.9
Majority		333	21.0	
Turnout		1,590	42.2	+12.1
Conservative gain from Labour		Swing		

Hollington
Party	Candidate	Votes	%	±%
Labour	Paul Silverson	497	45.0	+0.7
Conservative	Dorothy Lyons	220	19.9	−7.6
BNP	David Lovett	199	18.0	+18.0
Liberal Democrats	Patricia Kennelly	130	11.8	−5.9
Green	Kevin Young	58	5.3	−5.1
Majority		277	25.1	+8.3
Turnout		1,104	29.4	+4.5
Labour hold		Swing		

Maze Hill
Party	Candidate	Votes	%	±%
Conservative	Joy Waite	843	61.1	+13.0
Labour	Georgiana De Lussy	269	19.5	+2.0
Liberal Democrats	Antony Davis	268	19.4	+1.1
Majority		574	41.6	+11.8
Turnout		1,380	36.6	+0.3
Conservative hold		Swing		

Old Hastings
Party	Candidate	Votes	%	±%
Liberal Democrats	Susan Palmer	625	36.6	+0.3
Labour	Arthur Kitson	564	33.0	+2.9
Conservative	Paul Willard	519	30.4	+5.4
Majority		61	3.6	−2.6
Turnout		1,708	42.6	−0.2
Liberal Democrats gain from Labour		Swing		

Ore
Party	Candidate	Votes	%	±%
Conservative	Roy Tucker	482	38.7	−7.6
Labour	Richard Street	383	30.8	−2.5
Liberal Democrats	David Hancock	379	30.5	+10.1
Majority		99	7.9	−5.0
Turnout		1,244	36.3	+3.9
Conservative gain from Liberal Democrats		Swing		

Silverhill
Party	Candidate	Votes	%	±%
Conservative	Stephen Springthorpe	553	43.2	+2.6
Labour	Annette Barton	444	34.7	+2.6
Liberal Democrats	William Third	283	22.1	+3.9
Majority		109	8.5	0.0
Turnout		1,280	39.3	+0.1
Conservative gain from Labour		Swing		

St Helens
Party	Candidate	Votes	%	±%
Conservative	Keith Bing	909	52.2	+1.5
Labour	David Waller	475	27.3	−7.6
Liberal Democrats	Ann Terry	357	20.5	+6.1
Majority		434	24.9	+9.1
Turnout		1,741	44.2	−1.4
Conservative hold		Swing		

Tressell
Party	Candidate	Votes	%	±%
Labour	Jay Kramer	393		
Labour	Peter Chowney	340		
Liberal Democrats	Jennifer Ayres	308		
Green	Sally Phillips	267		
Conservative	Terence Keen	187		
Conservative	Matthew Lock	187		
BNP	Fay Hughes	155		
BNP	Nicholas Prince	131		
Turnout		1,968	34.6	+9.9
Labour hold		Swing		
Labour hold		Swing		

West St. Leonards
Party	Candidate	Votes	%	±%
Conservative	Peter Finch	602	43.0	+4.8
Labour	Michael Turner	478	34.2	+13.3
Liberal Democrats	Brett McLean	319	22.8	+0.8
Majority		124	8.8	−7.4
Turnout		1,399	39.2	+8.0
Conservative hold		Swing		

Wishing Tree
Party	Candidate	Votes	%	±%
Labour	Alan Roberts	563	46.3	−9.2
Conservative	Gladys Fawthrop	337	27.7	−1.7
Liberal Democrats	Andrea Bain	317	26.0	+10.9
Majority		226	18.6	−7.5
Turnout		1,217	35.5	−0.1
Labour hold		Swing		
