= 2010 Hastings Borough Council election =

2010 UK local government election

Map of the results of the 2010 Hastings council election. Labour in red and Conservatives in blue.

The 2010 Hastings Borough Council elections were held on 6 May 2010, with half of the council's seats up for election. The Labour Party regained control of the council from no overall control, despite suffering a heavy defeat in the nationwide general election that was held on the same day. Overall turnout was 61.9%. The election in Ore ward was delayed due to the death of the Conservative candidate following the close of nominations.

After the election, the composition of the council was:

- Labour 17
- Conservative 14
- Liberal Democrat 1

== Election result ==
Hastings local election result 2010
Party	Seats	Gains	Losses	Net gain/loss	Seats %	Votes %	Votes	+/−
Labour	11	5	0	+5	64.7	40.2	15,352	+5.5
Conservative	6	0	3	-3	35.3	37.2	14,222	-5.3
Liberal Democrats	0	0	2	-2	0	20.6	7,857	+1.6
BNP	0	0	0	0	0	1.4	531	-0.7
Independent	0	0	0	0	0	0.7	252	+0.7

== Ward results ==
Ashdown
Party	Candidate	Votes	%	±%
Conservative	John Wilson	1,568	51.2	−13.2
Labour	Terri Dowling	867	28.3	+9.4
Liberal Democrats	Alan Roscoe	625	20.4	+3.8
Majority		701	22.9	−22.6
Turnout		3,060	65.8	+31.1
Conservative hold		Swing		

Baird
Party	Candidate	Votes	%	±%
Labour	Mike Turner	889	42.8	+4.8
Conservative	Terry Fawthrop	829	39.9	−11.1
Liberal Democrats	Susan Tait	359	17.3	+6.3
Majority		60	2.9	
Turnout		2,077	58.3	+20.7
Labour gain from Conservative		Swing		

Braybrooke
Party	Candidate	Votes	%	±%
Labour	Godfrey Daniel	1,360	54.5	+1.3
Conservative	Amanda Charlesworth	702	28.1	−5.9
Liberal Democrats	Oliver Maloney	432	17.3	+4.5
Majority		658	26.4	+7.2
Turnout		2,494	66.1	+24.8
Labour hold		Swing		

Castle
Party	Candidate	Votes	%	±%
Labour	Lee Clark	1,226	50.0	+3.5
Conservative	Graeme Williams	627	25.6	+9.7
Liberal Democrats	Colin Dormer	598	24.4	+5.9
Majority		599	24.4	−3.6
Turnout		2,451	55.8	+19.1
Labour gain from Liberal Democrats		Swing		

Central St Leonards
Party	Candidate	Votes	%	±%
Labour	Jeremy Birch	1,123	53.5	+7.0
Conservative	Bhatti Anwar	530	25.2	−1.6
Liberal Democrats	Paul Smith	447	21.3	+5.9
Majority		593	28.3	+8.6
Turnout		2,100	50.3	+18.9
Labour hold		Swing		

Conquest
Party	Candidate	Votes	%	±%
Conservative	Eve Martin	1,461	53.0	+4.1
Labour	David Baker	745	27.0	+13.5
Liberal Democrats	Anne Gallop	551	20.0	−10.5
Majority		716	26.0	−19.4
Turnout		2,757	72.1	+26.7
Conservative hold		Swing		

Gensing
Party	Candidate	Votes	%	±%
Labour	Andrew Cartwright	1,095	46.6	+9.5
Conservative	Rob Lee	682	29.0	−1.7
Liberal Democrats	Chris Benner	573	24.4	−7.8
Majority		413	17.6	+12.7
Turnout		2,350	57.6	+20.9
Labour gain from Conservative		Swing		

Hollington (2 seats)
Party	Candidate	Votes	%	±%
Labour	Bruce Dowling	844	21.7	
Labour	Emily Westley	734	18.9	
Conservative	Liam Atkins	707	18.2	
Conservative	Mark Charlesworth	631	16.2	
Liberal Democrats	Vanessa Burton	428	11.0	
Liberal Democrats	Tricia Kennelly	328	8.4	
BNP	David Lovett	217	5.6	
Turnout		3,889	53.1	+28.0
Labour hold		Swing		
Labour hold		Swing		

Maze Hill
Party	Candidate	Votes	%	±%
Conservative	Joy Waite	1,195	48.8	−14.1
Labour	Ted Bacon	749	30.6	+8.2
Liberal Democrats	Christopher Dodwell	506	20.7	+6.0
Majority		446	18.2	−22.3
Turnout		2,450	60.4	+25.7
Conservative hold		Swing		

Old Hastings
Party	Candidate	Votes	%	±%
Labour	John Hodges	1,153	39.5	+9.3
Conservative	Stuart Padget	952	32.6	−2.3
Liberal Democrats	Stuart Murphy	811	27.8	−7.2
Majority		201	6.9	
Turnout		2,916	67.1	+24.3
Labour gain from Liberal Democrats		Swing		

Ore (Delayed until 17 June 2010)
Party	Candidate	Votes	%	±%
Labour	Michael Wincott	608	47.7	+12.8
Conservative	Stuart Padget	475	37.3	−13.0
Liberal Democrats	Anne Scott	158	12.4	−2.4
BNP	Nick Prince	33	2.6	+2.6
Majority		133	10.4	
Turnout		1,274	34.2	−0.1
Labour gain from Conservative		Swing		

Silverhill
Party	Candidate	Votes	%	±%
Conservative	Andrew Gurney	854	36.5	−10.8
Labour	Nigel Sinden	838	35.8	−3.3
Liberal Democrats	Christopher Beamount	397	17.0	+3.4
Independent	Stephen Springthorpe	252	10.8	+10.8
Majority		16	0.7	−7.4
Turnout		2,341	67.4	+34.1
Conservative hold		Swing		

St Helens
Party	Candidate	Votes	%	±%
Conservative	Simon Corello	1,276	43.4	−15.1
Labour	Michael Ward	1,098	37.4	+13.2
Liberal Democrats	John Tunbridge	546	19.2	+2.0
Majority		178	6.0	−28.3
Turnout		2,920	73.4	+23.3
Conservative hold		Swing		

Tressell
Party	Candidate	Votes	%	±%
Labour	Jay Kramer	876	45.8	+8.8
Conservative	John Dawson	487	25.5	−2.2
Liberal Democrats	Charlene Floyd	401	21.0	+0.3
BNP	Nick Prince	147	7.7	−6.9
Majority		389	20.3	+11.1
Turnout		1,911	54.8	+25.3
Labour hold		Swing		

West St. Leonards
Party	Candidate	Votes	%	±%
Conservative	Peter Finch	1,105	44.6	−3.9
Labour	Ken Maitland	830	33.5	−4.3
Liberal Democrats	Tony Seymour	542	21.9	+8.3
Majority		275	11.1	+0.4
Turnout		2,477	63.9	+28.1
Conservative hold		Swing		

Wishing Tree
Party	Candidate	Votes	%	±%
Labour	Alan Roberts	1,051	43.4	−3.3
Conservative	Chris Pillow	772	31.9	−6.0
Liberal Democrats	Jane Wainwright	465	19.2	+3.8
BNP	Mick Turner	134	5.5	+5.5
Majority		279	11.5	+2.7
Turnout		2,422	62.7	+26.4
Labour hold		Swing		
