= Hastings Borough Council =

English non-metropolitan district council in East Sussex, England

Type
- Type: Non-metropolitan district

Leadership
- Mayor: Paula Warne, Green since 20 May 2026
- Leader: Glenn Haffenden, Green since 14 May 2025
- Chief Executive: Rob Cottrill since November 2024

Structure
- Seats: 32 councillors
- Graph of the party split among 32 seats.
- Political groups: Administration (19) Green (19) Other parties (13) Reform UK (6) Labour (3) Conservative (2) Independent (2)
- Length of term: 4 years

Elections
- Last election: 7 May 2026
- Next election: to be confirmed

Meeting place
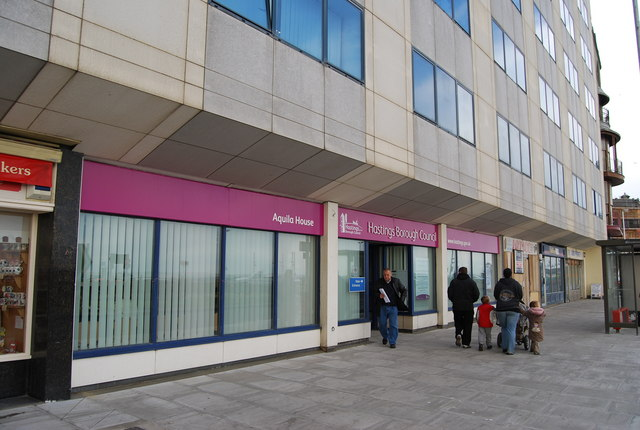
- Muriel Matters House, Breeds Place, Hastings, TN34 3UY

Website
- www.hastings.gov.uk

Hastings Borough Council is the local authority for Hastings in East Sussex, England. Hastings has had a council since medieval times, which has been reformed on numerous occasions. Since 1974, Hastings has been a non-metropolitan district with borough status.

The council has been controlled by the Green Party since 2026, having previously been under no overall control since 2022. The council is based at Muriel Matters House on the seafront.

The area covered by the council in East Sussex

== History ==
Hastings was an ancient borough. It was given the right to appoint a mayor in 1589. It was reformed in 1836 under the Municipal Corporations Act 1835 to become a municipal borough, governed by a body formally called the "mayor, aldermen and burgesses of the borough of Hastings", generally known as the corporation or town council. When elected county councils were established in 1889 under the Local Government Act 1888 it was decided that Hastings was sufficiently large for its existing council to provide county-level services and so Hastings was made a county borough, independent from East Sussex County Council.

On 1 April 1974, under the Local Government Act 1972, the borough became a non-metropolitan district within the non-metropolitan county of East Sussex, giving East Sussex County Council jurisdiction over the town as a higher-tier authority for the first time. Hastings kept its borough status, allowing the council to take the name Hastings Borough Council and letting the chair of the council take the title of mayor, continuing Hastings' series of mayors dating back to 1589.

== Governance ==
Hastings Borough Council provides district-level services. County-level services are provided by East Sussex County Council. There are no civil parishes in the borough, which is an unparished area.

=== Political control ===
The council has been controlled by the Green Party since the 2026 election.

Following the 2022 election, a Labour and Green coalition was formed, but separated five months later in October 2022, after which Labour ran the council as a minority administration.

In December 2023, six Labour councillors — including the Leader and Deputy Leader — resigned the party in protest at Keir Starmer's leadership and formed a new group, the Hastings Independents. Over the following week, they were joined by two more Labour councillors. The group has criticised the national party's 'micromanaging' of local elections, and its position on the Gaza war. In January 2024 a new administration comprising the Greens and the former Labour councillors took over the council, led by Green councillor Julia Hilton.

Following the 2024 election a Green Party minority administration was formed.

Political control of the council since the 1974 reforms has been as follows:

Party in control	Years
No overall control	1974–1976
Conservative	1976–1980
No overall control	1980–1996
Liberal Democrats	1996–1998
Labour	1998–2004
No overall control	2004–2006
Conservative	2006–2007
No overall control	2007–2010
Labour	2010–2022
No overall control	2022–2026
Green	2026–present

=== Leadership ===
The role of mayor is largely ceremonial in Hastings. Political leadership is instead provided by the leader of the council. The leaders since 2001 have been:

Councillor	Party	From	To
Jeremy Birch	Labour	2001	May 2006
Peter Pragnell	Conservative	17 May 2006	19 May 2010
Jeremy Birch	Labour	19 May 2010	6 May 2015
Peter Chowney	Labour	20 May 2015	18 Mar 2020
Kim Forward	Labour	18 Mar 2020	13 Apr 2022
Paul Barnett	Labour	13 Apr 2022	14 Dec 2023
Paul Barnett	Independent	14 Dec 2023	17 Jan 2024
Julia Hilton	Green	17 Jan 2024	14 May 2025
Glenn Haffenden	Green	14 May 2025	

=== Composition ===
Following the 2026 election and a subsequent change of allegiance later in May 2026, the composition of the council was:

Party	Councillors
Green	19
Reform	6
Labour	3
Conservative	2
Independent	2
Total	32

== Elections ==
Since the last boundary changes in 2018 the council has comprised 32 councillors representing 16 wards, with each ward electing two councillors. Elections are held in alternate years, with half the council (one councillor for each ward) being elected each time for a four-year term of office.

== Premises ==
The council is based at a modern office building called Muriel Matters House on Breeds Place, overlooking the seafront.

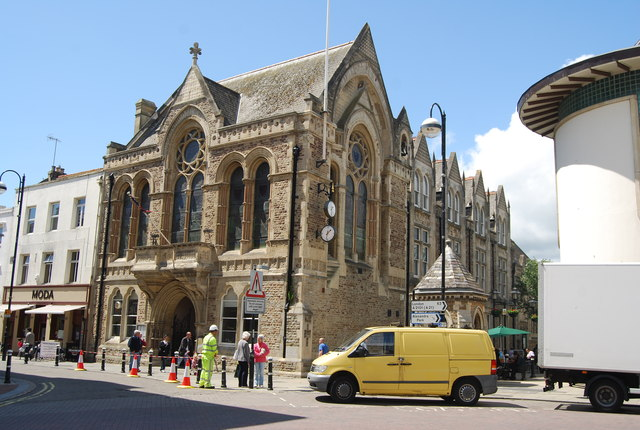
Hastings Town Hall, Queens Road: Council's headquarters until 2012.

The council was previously based at the Town Hall on Queens Road, which had been built in 1881. The council met and had its offices in the Town Hall until 2012. Most of the council's offices then moved to Aquila House on Breeds Place, which the council initially rented. In 2016 the council purchased Aquila House, renamed it Muriel Matters House after Muriel Matters (1877–1969) who had lived in the town, and created a new council chamber in the building.
