= South Lakeland District Council elections =

Local government elections in Cumbria, England

One third of South Lakeland District Council in Cumbria, England was elected each year, followed by one year without election.

The council was established in 1974 and abolished in 2023.

From the last boundary changes in 2008 until its abolition in 2023, 51 councillors were elected from 45 wards.

== Political control ==
The first election to the council was held in 1973, initially operating as a shadow authority alongside the outgoing authorities until the new arrangements came into effect on 1 April 1974. Political control of the council from 1974 until its abolition in 2023 was as follows:

Party in control	Years
Independent	1974–1979
No overall control	1979–2006
Liberal Democrats	2006–2023

=== Leadership ===
The leaders of the council from 2001 until the council's abolition were:

Councillor	Party	From	To
Colin Hodgson	Conservative	12 Sep 2001	May 2006
Brendan Jameson	Liberal Democrats	16 May 2006	19 Mar 2012
Peter Thornton	Liberal Democrats	16 May 2012	18 May 2016
Giles Archibald	Liberal Democrats	18 May 2016	19 May 2021
Jonathan Brook	Liberal Democrats	19 May 2021	31 Mar 2023

== Council elections ==
- 1973 South Lakeland District Council election
- 1976 South Lakeland District Council election
- 1979 South Lakeland District Council election (New ward boundaries)
- 1980 South Lakeland District Council election
- 1982 South Lakeland District Council election
- 1983 South Lakeland District Council election
- 1984 South Lakeland District Council election
- 1986 South Lakeland District Council election
- 1987 South Lakeland District Council election
- 1988 South Lakeland District Council election
- 1990 South Lakeland District Council election (District boundary changes took place but the number of seats remained the same)
- 1991 South Lakeland District Council election
- 1992 South Lakeland District Council election
- 1994 South Lakeland District Council election
- 1995 South Lakeland District Council election
- 1996 South Lakeland District Council election
- 1998 South Lakeland District Council election
- 1999 South Lakeland District Council election (New ward boundaries)
- 2000 South Lakeland District Council election
- 2002 South Lakeland District Council election
- 2003 South Lakeland District Council election
- 2004 South Lakeland District Council election
- 2006 South Lakeland District Council election
- 2007 South Lakeland District Council election
- 2008 South Lakeland District Council election (New ward boundaries reduced the number of seats by 1)
- 2010 South Lakeland District Council election
- 2011 South Lakeland District Council election
- 2012 South Lakeland District Council election
- 2014 South Lakeland District Council election
- 2015 South Lakeland District Council election
- 2016 South Lakeland District Council election
- 2018 South Lakeland District Council election (New ward boundaries)
- 2019 South Lakeland District Council election

== District result maps ==
2002 results map

2003 results map

2004 results map

2006 results map

2007 results map

2008 results map

2010 results map

2011 results map

2012 results map

2014 results map

2015 results map

2016 results map

2018 results map

2019 results map

== By-election results ==
=== 1997-2001 ===
Hawkshead By-Election 25 February 1999
Party	Candidate	Votes	%	±%
Liberal Democrats		219	55.7	
Conservative		174	44.3	
Majority		45	11.4	
Turnout		393	37.1	
Liberal Democrats hold		Swing		

=== 2001-2005 ===
Holker By-Election 20 September 2001
Party	Candidate	Votes	%	±%
Conservative	John Manning	538	71.2	N/A
Liberal Democrats	Jonathan Woddy	218	28.8	N/A
Majority		320	42.4	
Turnout		756	50.0	
Conservative gain from Independent		Swing		

Low Furness and Swarthmoor By-Election 11 October 2001
Party	Candidate	Votes	%	±%
Conservative	William Tyson	508	51.7	+9.6
Liberal Democrats	Peter Metcalfe	475	48.3	−5.3
Majority		33	3.4	
Turnout		983		
Conservative gain from Liberal Democrats		Swing		

Crake Valley By-Election 10 March 2005
Party	Candidate	Votes	%	±%
Liberal Democrats	Betty Spendlove	423	57.0	−8.9
Conservative	Walter Phillipson	277	37.3	+3.2
Labour	Susan Page	42	5.7	+5.7
Majority		146	19.7	
Turnout		742	50.1	
Liberal Democrats hold		Swing		

Ulverston South By-Election 10 March 2005
Party	Candidate	Votes	%	±%
Conservative	Brian Wilkinson	202	62.9	−3.4
Labour	Bharath Rajan	94	29.3	−4.4
Green	William Shaw	25	7.8	+7.8
Majority		108	33.6	
Turnout		321	23.3	
Conservative hold		Swing		

=== 2009-2015 ===
Lyth Valley 4 November 2010
Party	Candidate	Votes	%	±%
Conservative	John Holmes	474	49.5	−5.4
Liberal Democrats	Jane Hall	451	47.1	+4.4
Labour	Marilyn Molloy	32	3.3	+1.0
Majority		23	2.4	
Turnout		957	48.73	
Conservative gain from Liberal Democrats		Swing		

Windermere Town, 9 February 2012
Party	Candidate	Votes	%	±%
Liberal Democrats	Jo Stephenson	418	72.9	+3.0
Conservative	Sandra Lilley	85	14.8	−0.4
Labour	Penny Henderson	50	8.7	−6.1
UKIP	Robert Gibson	20	3.5	N/A
Majority		333	58.1	
Turnout		573	33.63	
Liberal Democrats hold		Swing		

Windermere Bowness North, 29 August 2013
Party	Candidate	Votes	%	±%
Liberal Democrats	Colin Jones	431	60.9	−4.1
Conservative	Ian Keeling	248	35.0	+5.1
Labour	Rae Cross	29	4.1	−0.9
Majority		183	25.9	
Turnout		708	42.75	
Liberal Democrats hold		Swing		

Levens, 17 October 2013
Party	Candidate	Votes	%	±%
Liberal Democrats	Annie Rawlinson	569	57.0	+1.2
Conservative	Brian Rendell	430	43.0	+2.8
Majority		139	14.0	
Turnout		999	58.8	
Liberal Democrats hold		Swing		

Windermere Town, 2 October 2014
Party	Candidate	Votes	%	±%
Liberal Democrats	Dyan Jones	416	64.0	−5.9
Conservative	Sandra Lilley	184	28.3	+13.1
Green	Gwen Harrison	50	7.7	N/A
Majority		333	58.1	
Turnout		650	39.42	
Liberal Democrats hold		Swing		

=== 2015-2021 ===
Windermere Bowness North, 13 October 2016
Party	Candidate	Votes	%	±%
Liberal Democrats	Andrew Jarvis	441	60.1	+11.1
Conservative	Martin Hall	256	34.9	−4.1
Green	Kate Threadgold	37	5.0	−1.0
Majority		185	25.2	
Turnout		740	45.8	
Liberal Democrats hold		Swing		

Ambleside & Grasmere, 4 May 2017
Party	Candidate	Votes	%	±%
Liberal Democrats	Vicky Hughes	695	50.9	−13.4
Conservative	Tim Brown	502	36.7	+14.0
Labour	Alison Gilchrist	87	6.4	−0.1
Green	Chris Rowley	82	6.0	−0.4
Majority		193	41.6	
Turnout		1,372	46.76	
Liberal Democrats hold		Swing		

Arnside and Milnthorpe, 20 December 2018
Party	Candidate	Votes	%	±%
Liberal Democrats	Helen Chaffey	1,319	59.4	+3.9
Conservative	Rachel Ashburner	709	31.9	−1.7
Green	Jill Abel	125	5.6	−7.4
Labour	Kate Love	68	3.1	−2.0
Majority		610	27.5	
Turnout		2,221	44.2	
Liberal Democrats hold		Swing		

Broughton & Coniston, 6 May 2021
Party	Candidate	Votes	%	±%
Liberal Democrats	Heather Troughton	1,317	51.9	+11.4
Conservative	Matt Brereton	977	38.5	+0.3
Green	Lynette Gilligan	136	5.4	−2.4
Labour	Paul Martin	108	4.3	−1.0
Majority		340		
Liberal Democrats gain from Conservative		Swing		

Furness Peninsula, 6 May 2021
Party	Candidate	Votes	%	±%
Conservative	Ben Cooper	939	45.7	+9.3
Liberal Democrats	Loraine Birchall	790	38.4	−7.1
Labour	Sharon Webster	216	10.5	+0.2
Green	Peter Howlett	111	5.4	−2.5
Majority		149		
Conservative hold		Swing		

Grange, 6 May 2021
Party	Candidate	Votes	%	±%
Liberal Democrats	Pete Endsor	1,427	60.2	+2.5
Conservative	Aron Taylor	627	26.4	−1.7
Green	Robin Le Mare	163	6.9	−1.6
Labour	Ben Barker	155	6.5	+0.8
Majority		800		
Liberal Democrats hold		Swing		

Kendal Rural, 6 May 2021
Party	Candidate	Votes	%	±%
Liberal Democrats	Ali Jama	1,206	52.1	+1.6
Conservative	Luke Gudgeon	794	34.3	+2.3
Green	Frances Richardson	239	10.3	−3.3
Labour	Hanna Burke	74	3.2	−0.7
Majority		412		
Liberal Democrats hold		Swing		

Grange, 12 August 2021
Party	Candidate	Votes	%	±%
Liberal Democrats	Fiona Hanlon	1,336	66.2	+8.5
Conservative	Steve Chambers	541	26.8	−1.3
Green	Robin Le Mare	85	4.2	−4.3
Labour	Patricia Wright	56	2.8	−2.9
Majority		800	33.8	+4.2
Turnout		2,022	42.9	−8.7
Liberal Democrats hold		Swing		

Kendal North, 23 September 2021
Party	Candidate	Votes	%	±%
Liberal Democrats	Jonathan Cornthwaite	622	46.9	+12.2
Green	Liz Hendry	527	39.8	+9.9
Conservative	Aron Taylor	122	9.2	−14.6
Labour	Virginia Branney	54	4.1	−11.1
Majority		95		
Liberal Democrats hold		Swing		
