= 2012 South Lakeland District Council election =

2012 UK local government election

← 2011	3 May 2012	2014 →

18 of the 51 seats to South Lakeland District Council 26 seats needed for a majority
	First party	Second party	Third party
Party	Liberal Democrats	Conservative	Labour
Last election	32	18	1
Seats won	9	6	3
Seats after	34	14	3
Seat change	▲2	▼4	▲2
Popular vote	7,569	6,885	1,637
Percentage	44.9%	40.8%	9.7%
- Map showing the results of the 2012 South Lakeland District Council elections by ward. Liberal Democrats in yellow, Conservatives in blue, Labour in red. Wards in dark grey were not contested in 2012.
Council control before election
Liberal Democrats
Council control after election
Liberal Democrats

The 2012 South Lakeland District Council election was held on 3 May 2012 to elect members of South Lakeland District Council in Cumbria, England. One third of the council was up for election, having been elected "all out" in 2008 and "in thirds" every year thereafter.

== Election results summary ==
Party	Previous council	New council	+/-
Liberal Democrats	33	34	▲1
Conservatives	17	14	▼3
Labour	1	3	▲2
Total	51	51	
Working majority	15	17	

South Lakeland local election result 2012
Party	Seats	Gains	Losses	Net gain/loss	Seats %	Votes %	Votes	+/−
Liberal Democrats	9	1	1	0	50.0	44.66	7,202	
Conservative	6	1	3	-2	33.3	42.26	6,815	
Labour	3	2	0	+2	16.7	9.02	1,454	
Green	0	0	0	0	0	4.06	655	

== Ward results ==
Arnside & Beetham
Party	Candidate	Votes	%	±%
Liberal Democrats	Pru Jupe*	1,265	70.5	+10.3
Conservative	Mike Nicholson	529	29.5	−8.6
Majority		736	41.0	+18.9
Turnout		1,794	50.79	−11.9
Liberal Democrats hold		Swing		

Burton & Holme
Party	Candidate	Votes	%	±%
Conservative	Roger Bingham*	991	59.8	−7.4
Liberal Democrats	Vic Brown	666	40.2	+4.8
Majority		325	19.6	−12.2
Turnout		1,657	54.2	−2.9
Conservative hold		Swing		

Coniston and Crake Valley
Party	Candidate	Votes	%	±%
Conservative	Anne Hall*	418	60.0	−4.0
Liberal Democrats	Michael Carter	279	40.0	+4.0
Majority		139	20.0	−8.1
Turnout		697	53.53	−5.8
Conservative hold		Swing		

Crooklands
Party	Candidate	Votes	%	±%
Liberal Democrats	Sheila Eccles*	599	66.5	−3.9
Conservative	Jess Alston	267	29.6	±0.0
Green	Ko Koens	35	3.9	N/A
Majority		332	36.9	−3.9
Turnout		901	50.7	−14.1
Liberal Democrats hold		Swing		

Hawkshead
Party	Candidate	Votes	%	±%
Liberal Democrats	David Fletcher	412	53.4	−0.1
Conservative	Sarah Ibbetson	305	39.5	−7.0
Green	Paul Milling	55	7.1	N/A
Majority		107	13.9	+6.9
Turnout		772	52.19	−8.2
Liberal Democrats hold		Swing		

Kendal Fell (by-election)
Party	Candidate	Votes	%	±%
Liberal Democrats	Giles Archibald	387	53.8	−21.5
Labour	Lois Sparling	183	25.5	+0.8
Conservative	Patrick Birchall	70	9.7	N/A
Green	Paul Metsers	49	6.8	N/A
UKIP	Malcolm Nightingale	30	4.2	N/A
Majority		204	28.3	−22.4
Turnout		1,722	41.87	−24.4
Liberal Democrats hold		Swing		

Levens
Party	Candidate	Votes	%	±%
Liberal Democrats	Mary Orr	635	55.8	−8.3
Conservative	Brian Rendell	458	40.2	+4.3
Green	Leigh Martindale	45	4.0	N/A
Majority		177	15.6	−12.7
Turnout		1,138	67.53	+0.3
Liberal Democrats hold		Swing		

Lyth Valley
Party	Candidate	Votes	%	±%
Conservative	John Holmes*	633	61.8	+17.4
Liberal Democrats	Danny Gallagher	341	33.3	−22.3
Labour	Marilyn Molloy	50	4.9	N/A
Majority		292	28.5	+17.3
Turnout		1,024	54.23	−3.4
Conservative gain from Liberal Democrats		Swing		

- The Conservative Party had previously gained the seat in Lyth Valley at a by-election.

Milnthorpe
Party	Candidate	Votes	%	±%
Liberal Democrats	David Ryder	590	66.9	−8.5
Conservative	Stell Clark	245	27.8	+3.2
Green	Frank Airey	47	5.3	N/A
Majority		345	39.1	−11.7
Turnout		882	52.34	−1.8
Liberal Democrats hold		Swing		

Sedbergh & Kirkby Lonsdale
Party	Candidate	Votes	%	±%
Liberal Democrats	Nick Cotton	1,184	47.5	+4.4
Conservative	Kevin Lancaster*	1,115	44.7	−7.5
Labour	Martin Holborn	103	4.1	N/A
Green	Mandy Barnett	92	3.7	N/A
Majority		69	2.8	N/A
Turnout		2,494	50.89	−5.7
Liberal Democrats gain from Conservative		Swing		

Staveley-in-Cartmel
Party	Candidate	Votes	%	±%
Liberal Democrats	Sue Sanderson	436	56.8	+4.2
Conservative	Ted Walsh	331	43.2	−4.2
Majority		105	13.6	+8.4
Turnout		767	49.42	−6.3
Liberal Democrats hold		Swing		

Staveley-in-Westmorland
Party	Candidate	Votes	%	±%
Liberal Democrats	Stan Collins*	581	72.1	−8.0
Conservative	Sandra Lilley	153	19.0	−0.9
Green	Rachael Milling	72	8.9	N/A
Majority		428	53.1	−7.1
Turnout		806	47.19	−6.2
Liberal Democrats hold		Swing		

Ulverston Central
Party	Candidate	Votes	%	±%
Labour	Bharath Rajan	211	42.3	+11.1
Conservative	Norman Bishop-Rowe*	209	41.9	−15.5
Liberal Democrats	Andrew Hudson	45	9.0	−2.4
Green	Alison Morris	34	6.8	N/A
Majority		2	0.4	N/A
Turnout		499	33.13	+0.1
Labour gain from Conservative		Swing		

Ulverston East
Party	Candidate	Votes	%	±%
Labour Co-op	John Wilson*	214	51.8	+7.6
Conservative	Peter Hornby	111	26.9	−13.2
UKIP	Ian Jackson	34	8.2	N/A
Green	Judith Filmore	31	7.5	N/A
Liberal Democrats	Maureen Nicholson	23	5.6	−10.1
Majority		103	24.9	+24.5
Turnout		413	25.12	−4.3
Labour hold		Swing		

Ulverston North
Party	Candidate	Votes	%	±%
Conservative	Helen Irving	280	39.4	−15.9
Labour Co-op	Colin Pickthall	248	34.9	+11.3
Green	Chris Loynes	114	16.0	+5.2
Liberal Democrats	Ann Downe	69	9.7	−0.6
Majority		32	4.5	−27.1
Turnout		711	46.26	−0.5
Conservative hold		Swing		

Ulverston South
Party	Candidate	Votes	%	±%
Conservative	Amanda Rigg	239	47.7	−17.2
Labour Co-op	Judith Ann Pickthall	210	41.9	+20.2
Green	Kate Rawles	31	6.2	N/A
Liberal Democrats	David Khan	21	4.2	−9.2
Majority		29	5.8	−37.4
Turnout		501	33.51	−7.4
Conservative hold		Swing		

Ulverston Town
Party	Candidate	Votes	%	±%
Labour	John Clough	271	54.1	+11.4
Conservative	James Samson*	150	29.9	−13.6
Green	Simon Filmore	50	10.0	N/A
Liberal Democrats	Andrew Mellor	30	6.0	−7.8
Majority		121	24.2	N/A
Turnout		501	33.80	+0.9
Labour gain from Conservative		Swing		

Ulverston West
Party	Candidate	Votes	%	±%
Conservative	Janette Jenkinson*	381	63.2	−6.8
Labour	Ian Hunt	147	24.4	+7.1
Green	Robert O'Hara	49	8.1	N/A
Liberal Democrats	Loraine Birchall	26	4.3	−8.4
Majority		234	38.8	−13.9
Turnout		603	39.96	−1.2
Conservative hold		Swing		

== By-Elections ==
Windermere Bowness North, 29 August 2013
Party	Candidate	Votes	%	±%
Liberal Democrats	Colin Jones	431	60.9	−4.1
Conservative	Ian Keeling	248	35.0	+5.1
Labour	Rae Cross	29	4.1	−0.9
Majority		183	25.9	−9.2
Turnout		708	42.75	−14.2
Liberal Democrats hold		Swing		

Levens, 17 October 2013
Party	Candidate	Votes	%	±%
Liberal Democrats	Annie Rawlinson	569	57.0	+1.2
Conservative	Brian Rendell	430	43.0	+2.8
Majority		139	14.0	−2.3
Turnout		999	58.8	−11.4
Liberal Democrats hold		Swing		

== See also ==
- South Lakeland local elections
