= 2010 South Lakeland District Council election =

2010 UK local government election

← 2008	6 May 2010	2011 →

18 of the 51 seats to South Lakeland District Council 26 seats needed for a majority
	First party	Second party	Third party
Party	Liberal Democrats	Conservative	Labour
Last election	36	14	1
Seats won	16	2	0
Seats after	34	16	1
Seat change	▼2	▲2	Steady
Popular vote	15,867	8,586	1,736
Percentage	60.1%	32.5%	6.6%
- Map showing the results of the 2010 South Lakeland District Council elections by ward. Liberal Democrats in yellow and Conservatives in blue. Wards in dark grey were not contested in 2010.
Council control before election
Liberal Democrats
Council control after election
Liberal Democrats

The 2010 South Lakeland District Council election took place on 6 May 2010 to elect members of South Lakeland District Council in Cumbria, England. One third of the council was up for election and the Liberal Democrats stayed in overall control of the council.

After the election, the composition of the council was:

- Liberal Democrat 34
- Conservative 16
- Labour 1

== Background ==
Before the election the Liberal Democrats had controlled the council since winning a majority at the 2006 election. Going into the 2010 election they held 36 seats, compared to 14 for the Conservatives and 1 seat for the Labour Party.

18 seats were being contested in the election with the Liberal Democrats defending all of them.

== Election result ==
The results saw the Liberal Democrats maintain their majority on the council despite losing 2 seats to the Conservatives. The Conservatives gains came in the seats of Mid Furness and Staveley-in-Cartmel, and left the Liberal Democrats on 34 seats, compared to 16 for the Conservatives. Overall turnout in the election was 72.25%, due to the election being held at the same time as the general election.

Party	Previous council	New council	+/-
Liberal Democrats	36	34	▼2
Conservatives	14	16	▲2
Labour	1	1	Steady
Total	51	51	
Working majority	21	17	

South Lakeland local election result 2010
Party	Seats	Gains	Losses	Net gain/loss	Seats %	Votes %	Votes	+/−
Liberal Democrats	16	0	2	-2	88.9	60.1	15,877	+2.7%
Conservative	2	2	0	+2	11.1	33.6	8,866	-6.0%
Labour	0	0	0	0	0	5.5	1,456	+2.9%
Green	0	0	0	0	0	0.8	203	+0.4%

== Ward results ==
Ambleside & Grasmere
Party	Candidate	Votes	%	±%
Liberal Democrats	David Vatcher*	1,531	61.7	−3.6
Conservative	Alan Clarke	826	33.3	+1.5
Labour	Kathy Cross	123	5.0	N/A
Majority		705	28.4	−5.1
Turnout		2,480	62.1	+19.5
Liberal Democrats hold		Swing		

Kendal Castle
Party	Candidate	Votes	%	±%
Liberal Democrats	Sonia Lawson*	786	68.6	−0.7
Conservative	James Alexander	359	31.4	+0.7
Majority		427	37.3	−1.4
Turnout		1,145	76.9	+20.2
Liberal Democrats hold		Swing		

Kendal Far Cross
Party	Candidate	Votes	%	±%
Liberal Democrats	Clive Graham*	695	60.7	−4.4
Conservative	Colin Bell	321	28.0	+8.0
Labour	Kieran Roberts	129	11.3	N/A
Majority		374	32.7	−12.4
Turnout		1,145	67.5	+22.9
Liberal Democrats hold		Swing		

Kendal Fell
Party	Candidate	Votes	%	±%
Liberal Democrats	Brendan Jameson**	855	75.3	+4.9
Labour	Marilyn Molloy	280	24.7	+13.5
Majority		575	50.7	−1.2
Turnout		1,135	66.3	+22.3
Liberal Democrats hold		Swing		

- Brendan Jameson was a sitting councillor for Kendal Parks ward.

Kendal Heron Hill
Party	Candidate	Votes	%	±%
Liberal Democrats	Andy Shine*	883	72.6	−5.0
Conservative	David Perry	334	27.4	+5.0
Majority		549	45.1	−10.1
Turnout		1,217	79.3	+25.1
Liberal Democrats hold		Swing		

Kendal Highgate
Party	Candidate	Votes	%	±%
Liberal Democrats	Philip Dixon	723	65.1	−17.8
Conservative	Deborah Huck	250	22.5	+5.4
Labour	Allan Ring	138	12.4	N/A
Majority		473	42.6	−23.1
Turnout		1,111	67.0	+27.3
Liberal Democrats hold		Swing		

Kendal Kirkland
Party	Candidate	Votes	%	±%
Liberal Democrats	Julie Dawson*	611	60.1	−8.3
Conservative	Emma Hine	208	20.5	+7.5
Labour	Tony Rothwell	198	19.5	+0.9
Majority		403	39.6	−10.2
Turnout		1,017	62.3	+26.1
Liberal Democrats hold		Swing		

Kendal Mintsfeet
Party	Candidate	Votes	%	±%
Liberal Democrats	David Evans	873	71.8	−10.2
Conservative	Lyndsay Slater	343	28.2	+10.2
Majority		530	43.6	−20.4
Turnout		1,216	73.6	+28.3
Liberal Democrats hold		Swing		

Kendal Nether
Party	Candidate	Votes	%	±%
Liberal Democrats	Clare Feeney-Johnson*	863	69.2	−16.0
Conservative	Stephen Chambers	297	23.8	+9.0
Labour	Charles Haigh	87	7.0	N/A
Majority		566	45.4	−25.0
Turnout		1,247	75.1	+25.9
Liberal Democrats hold		Swing		

Kendle Oxenholme & Natland
Party	Candidate	Votes	%	±%
Liberal Democrats	Brenda Gray*	702	54.0	−14.2
Conservative	Alan Bobbett	546	42.0	+10.2
Labour	Rae Cross	51	3.9	N/A
Majority		156	12.0	−24.4
Turnout		1,299	77.5	+23.4
Liberal Democrats hold		Swing		

Kendal Parks
Party	Candidate	Votes	%	±%
Liberal Democrats	Jonathan Brook**	787	65.1	−14.3
Conservative	Dan Ross	320	26.5	+5.9
Labour	Lois Sparling	101	8.4	N/A
Majority		467	38.7	−20.2
Turnout		1,208	72.1	+30.3
Liberal Democrats hold		Swing		

- Jonathan Brook was a sitting councillor for Kendal Mintsfeet ward.

Kendal Romney
Party	Candidate	Votes	%	±%
Liberal Democrats	Graham Vincent*	775	62.9	−17.3
Conservative	Pam Flitcroft	336	27.3	+7.5
Labour	Penelope Henderson	121	9.8	N/A
Majority		439	35.6	−24.8
Turnout		1,232	71.9	+26.5
Liberal Democrats hold		Swing		

Kendal Stonecross
Party	Candidate	Votes	%	±%
Liberal Democrats	Sylvia Emmott*	850	65.2	−17.7
Conservative	Nigel Byrom	381	29.2	+12.1
Labour	Ian Law	72	5.5	N/A
Majority		469	36.0	−29.8
Turnout		1,303	80.6	+25.4
Liberal Democrats hold		Swing		

Kendal Strickland
Party	Candidate	Votes	%	±%
Liberal Democrats	Stephen Coleman*	738	65.2	−18.7
Conservative	Derrick Wade	279	24.6	+8.5
Labour	John Batteson	115	10.2	N/A
Majority		459	40.5	−27.4
Turnout		1,132	75.5	+26.7
Liberal Democrats hold		Swing		

Kendal Underley
Party	Candidate	Votes	%	±%
Liberal Democrats	Rob Boden	709	60.3	−8.8
Conservative	Keith Dawson	291	24.8	+9.9
Labour	Paul Braithwaite	175	14.9	−1.1
Majority		418	35.6	−17.5
Turnout		1,175	69.2	+22.0
Liberal Democrats hold		Swing		

Mid Furness
Party	Candidate	Votes	%	±%
Conservative	Caroline Airey	1,132	48.8	+13.9
Liberal Democrats	Jane Carson*	986	42.5	−17.4
Green	Jo-Anna Duncalf	203	8.7	N/A
Majority		146	6.3	N/A
Turnout		2,321	73.2	+24.6
Conservative gain from Liberal Democrats		Swing		

Sedbergh & Kirkby Lonsdale
Party	Candidate	Votes	%	±%
Liberal Democrats	Ian McPherson*	1,962	51.6	+6.2
Conservative	Anne Fenwick	1,691	44.5	+3.4
Labour	Derek Longmire	146	3.8	N/A
Majority		271	7.1	+5.8
Turnout		3,799	78.1	+21.5
Liberal Democrats hold		Swing		

Staveley-in-Cartmel (by-election)
Party	Candidate	Votes	%	±%
Conservative	Ted Walsh	672	55.1	+7.7
Liberal Democrats	Sue Sanderson	548	44.9	−7.7
Majority		124	10.2	N/A
Turnout		1,220	76.7	+21.0
Conservative gain from Liberal Democrats		Swing		

== By-Elections ==
Lyth Valley, 4 November 2010
Party	Candidate	Votes	%	±%
Conservative	John Holmes	474	49.5	+5.1
Liberal Democrats	Jane Hall	451	47.1	−8.5
Labour	Marilyn Molloy	32	3.3	N/A
Majority		23	2.4	N/A
Turnout		957	48.73	−8.9
Conservative gain from Liberal Democrats		Swing		
