= 2000 South Lakeland District Council election =

UK local government election

The 2000 South Lakeland District Council election took place on 4 May 2000 to elect members of South Lakeland District Council in Cumbria, England. One-third of the council was up for election, and stayed under no overall control.

After the election, the composition of the council was as follows:

- Liberal Democrat 23
- Conservative 15
- Labour 9
- Independent 5

== Election result ==
South Lakeland local election result 2000
Party	Seats	Gains	Losses	Net gain/loss	Seats %	Votes %	Votes	+/−
Liberal Democrats	7			+2	38.9			
Conservative	7			-2	38.9			
Labour	3			0	16.7			
Independent	1			0	5.6			

== Ward results ==
Arnside and Beetham
Party	Candidate	Votes	%	±%
Liberal Democrats	P Mangan	967	55.9	+10.0
Conservative	A Taylor	764	44.1	−2.8
Majority		203	11.8	
Turnout			49.0	+4.9
Liberal Democrats gain from Conservative		Swing		

Burton & Holme
Party	Candidate	Votes	%	±%
Conservative	Roger Bingham*	762	82.4	+3.3
Liberal Democrats	Ms T Blakey	163	17.6	−3.3
Majority		599	64.8	
Turnout			45.8	+2.6
Conservative hold		Swing		

Coniston
Party	Candidate	Votes	%	±%
Conservative	Doreen Hall	473	56.0	N/A
Liberal Democrats	Ms E Vaughan	371	44.0	N/A
Majority		102	12.0	
Turnout			55.6	+55.6
Conservative gain from Independent		Swing		

Grange
Party	Candidate	Votes	%	±%
Liberal Democrats	Robert Leach*	1,027	62.9	+10.2
Conservative	W Bleasdale	607	37.1	−10.0
Majority		420	25.8	
Turnout			44.9	−0.6
Liberal Democrats hold		Swing		

Hawkshead
Party	Candidate	Votes	%	±%
Liberal Democrats	Gordon Jenkinson	329	50.1	−1.6
Conservative	Oliver Pearson	328	49.9	+1.6
Majority		1	0.1	
Turnout			43.8	+4.9
Liberal Democrats hold		Swing		

Levens
Party	Candidate	Votes	%	±%
Liberal Democrats	Brenda Woof	452	56.6	−8.0
Conservative	Ms A Wood	347	43.4	+8.0
Majority		105	13.2	
Turnout			54.0	+0.4
Liberal Democrats hold		Swing		

Low Furness and Swarthmoor
Party	Candidate	Votes	%	±%
Independent	David Foot	673	51.7	+13.6
Conservative	William Tyson*	629	48.3	+6.2
Majority		44	3.4	
Turnout			39.0	+0.8
Independent gain from Conservative		Swing		

Lyth Valley
Party	Candidate	Votes	%	±%
Conservative	Enid Robinson*	407	61.2	−1.6
Liberal Democrats	Gwyneth Raymond	258	38.8	+12.2
Majority		149	22.4	
Turnout			39.6	+6.8
Conservative hold		Swing		

Milnthorpe
Party	Candidate	Votes	%	±%
Liberal Democrats	Malcolm Alston*	458	77.8	+3.5
Conservative	M Graham	131	22.2	−3.5
Majority		327	55.6	
Turnout			35.2	+1.7
Liberal Democrats hold		Swing		

Natland
Party	Candidate	Votes	%	±%
Liberal Democrats	Heather Gardner	465	55.3	+27.9
Conservative	Alan Bobbett*	376	44.7	−14.4
Majority		89	10.6	
Turnout			53.8	+13.1
Liberal Democrats gain from Conservative		Swing		

Staveley-in-Cartmel
Party	Candidate	Votes	%	±%
Conservative	Michael Bentley*	329	53.1	−0.4
Liberal Democrats	S Lockton	291	46.9	+0.4
Majority		38	6.2	
Turnout			42.9	+1.7
Conservative hold		Swing		

Staveley-in-Westmorland
Party	Candidate	Votes	%	±%
Liberal Democrats	Stan Collins*	590	78.8	+7.2
Conservative	George Richardson	159	21.2	−1.3
Majority		431	57.6	
Turnout			43.2	−2.5
Liberal Democrats hold		Swing		

Ulverston Central
Party	Candidate	Votes	%	±%
Labour	David Miller*	321	61.6	−5.9
Conservative	P McGillivray	200	38.4	+5.9
Majority		121	23.2	
Turnout			31.9	−3.2
Labour hold		Swing		

Ulverston East
Party	Candidate	Votes	%	±%
Labour	Robert Bolton*	333	77.1	−8.7
Conservative	Peter Hornby	99	22.9	+8.7
Majority		234	54.2	
Turnout			28.2	−8.3
Labour hold		Swing		

Ulverston North
Party	Candidate	Votes	%	±%
Conservative	Colin Hodgson*	404	68.7	+9.9
Labour	Ms J Povey	184	31.3	−1.2
Majority		220	37.4	
Turnout			37.5	−7.4
Conservative hold		Swing		

Ulverston South
Party	Candidate	Votes	%	±%
Conservative	Alfred Jarvis*	311	62.3	+9.9
Labour	Ms V Miller	188	37.7	−9.9
Majority		123	24.6	
Turnout			32.0	−9.4
Conservative hold		Swing		

Ulverston Town
Party	Candidate	Votes	%	±%
Labour	Philip Lister*	453	74.5	+10.0
Conservative	Ms P Prosser	155	25.5	−10.0
Majority		298	49.0	
Turnout			42.9	−5.4
Labour hold		Swing		

Ulverston West
Party	Candidate	Votes	%	±%
Conservative	Janette Jenkinson*	416	77.9	+2.8
Labour	Fay Plant	118	22.1	−2.8
Majority		298	55.8	
Turnout			32.5	−6.9
Conservative hold		Swing		
