= 2002 South Lakeland District Council election =

2002 UK local government election

Results of the 2002 South Lakeland District Council election

The 2002 South Lakeland District Council election took place on 2 May 2002 to elect members of South Lakeland District Council in Cumbria, England. One third of the council was up for election and the council stayed under no overall control.

After the election, the composition of the council was:

- Liberal Democrat 21
- Conservative 19
- Labour 9
- Independent 3

== Background ==
Before the election the Liberal Democrats were the largest group on the council, but no party had a majority. 14 of the seats being contested were in Kendal, with the Liberal Democrats defending 9 of the 18 seats which were up for election. 3 councillors stood down at the election, Liberal Democrat John Sudholme of Kendal Castle ward, Labour's Jim Blamire of Kendal Underley and independent Philip Ball of Kendal Oxenholme.

Issues in the election included plans to move council housing from the direct control of the council, with Labour opposing the move and both the Conservatives and Liberal Democrats supporting it. Other issues included improving the council finances, increasing recycling, parking and social exclusion.

== Election result ==
The results saw little change in the party balance on the council, with the only net change being the Conservatives going up by 1 seat to 19 councillors, at the expense of the independents, who dropped to 3 seats. Close results came in Kendal Nether, where Labour gained a seat from the Liberal Democrats by 7 votes after a recount, and Kendal Highgate, where the Liberal Democrats took a seat from Labour by 13 votes.

South Lakeland local election result 2002
Party	Seats	Gains	Losses	Net gain/loss	Seats %	Votes %	Votes	+/−
Liberal Democrats	9			0	50.0	45.8	5,690	
Labour	6			0	33.3	22.1	2,746	
Conservative	2			+1	11.1	30.6	3,799	
Independent	1			-1	5.6	1.5	190	

One Independent candidate was unopposed.

== Ward results ==
Arnside and Beetham (by-election)
Party	Candidate	Votes	%	±%
Liberal Democrats	Ian Stewart	1,038	54.1	−1.8
Conservative	George Crossman	879	45.9	+1.8
Majority		159	8.2	−3.6
Turnout		1,917	54.8	+10.7
Liberal Democrats hold		Swing		

Kendal Castle
Party	Candidate	Votes	%	±%
Liberal Democrats	Sonia Lawson	344	51.7	−3.8
Conservative	Lyndsay Slater	267	40.2	+12.7
Labour	Alan Whitton	54	8.1	−8.9
Majority		77	11.5	
Turnout		665	44.0	+3.0
Liberal Democrats hold		Swing		

Kendal Far Cross
Party	Candidate	Votes	%	±%
Conservative	Simon Butterfield	278	43.9	+29.2
Liberal Democrats	Carole Cliffe	218	34.4	−37.3
Labour	Guy Johnson	137	21.6	+8.1
Majority		60	9.5	
Turnout		633	38.8	+9.1
Conservative gain from Liberal Democrats		Swing		

Kendal Fell
Party	Candidate	Votes	%	±%
Labour	Robin Yates*	233	47.6	−14.9
Liberal Democrats	Geoffrey Cook	195	39.9	+2.4
Conservative	Helen Graham	61	12.5	N/A
Majority		38	7.7	
Turnout		489	35.6	−3.6
Labour hold		Swing		

Kendal Glebelands
Party	Candidate	Votes	%	±%
Labour	Robert Rothwell*	276	39.8	−8.5
Liberal Democrats	Russell Caton	250	36.1	+19.2
Conservative	Pamela Flitcroft	167	24.1	−10.7
Majority		26	3.7	
Turnout		693	46.4	+6.5
Labour hold		Swing		

Kendal Heron Hill
Party	Candidate	Votes	%	±%
Liberal Democrats	Stephen Shine*	411	63.7	−9.9
Conservative	Susan Hunt	154	23.9	+7.6
Labour	Margaret Alderson	80	12.4	+2.3
Majority		257	39.8	
Turnout		645	38.8	+0.2
Liberal Democrats hold		Swing		

Kendal Highgate
Party	Candidate	Votes	%	±%
Liberal Democrats	Paul Little	269	43.4	+5.0
Labour	Rita Molloy*	256	41.4	−6.4
Conservative	Frank Brooks	94	15.2	+1.4
Majority		13	2.0	
Turnout		619	42.2	+7.5
Liberal Democrats gain from Labour		Swing		

Kendal Kirkland
Party	Candidate	Votes	%	±%
Labour	Avril Dobson*	255	64.4	−17.1
Conservative	Janet Brooks	77	19.4	N/A
Liberal Democrats	Gwyneth Raymond	64	16.2	−2.3
Majority		178	45.0	
Turnout		396	29.0	−3.6
Labour hold		Swing		

Kendal Mintsfeet
Party	Candidate	Votes	%	±%
Liberal Democrats	Angela Barratt*	248	42.6	−20.6
Labour	Brian Dobson	184	31.6	+15.9
Conservative	Jack Tomlinson	150	25.8	+4.7
Majority		64	11.0	
Turnout		582	35.3	+9.8
Liberal Democrats hold		Swing		

Kendal Nether
Party	Candidate	Votes	%	±%
Labour	Paul Braithwaite	298	44.4	+2.3
Liberal Democrats	Christopher Mayho*	291	43.4	−6.4
Conservative	Susannah Pearson	82	12.2	+4.2
Majority		7	1.0	
Turnout		671	45.8	+1.7
Labour gain from Liberal Democrats		Swing		

Kendal Oxenholme
Party	Candidate	Votes	%	±%
Liberal Democrats	Gwendoline Murfin	363	57.5	−0.8
Conservative	Olga Lewis	154	24.4	+11.8
Labour	Keith Fawcett	114	18.1	−11.0
Majority		209	33.1	
Turnout		631	36.2	+3.3
Liberal Democrats hold		Swing		

Kendal Parks
Party	Candidate	Votes	%	±%
Liberal Democrats	Brendan Jameson*	395	73.3	−7.8
Conservative	Elizabeth Graham	101	18.7	+6.9
Labour	Helen Speed	43	8.0	+0.9
Majority		294	54.6	
Turnout		539	32.8	−1.3
Liberal Democrats hold		Swing		

Kendal Stonecross
Party	Candidate	Votes	%	±%
Liberal Democrats	Graham Vincent*	491	58.8	+9.8
Conservative	Harold Barker	282	33.8	−6.8
Labour	Terence McIntee	62	7.4	−3.0
Majority		209	25.0	
Turnout		835	52.7	+7.1
Liberal Democrats hold		Swing		

Kendal Strickland
Party	Candidate	Votes	%	±%
Labour	Jean Ewing*	375	61.0	−11.0
Conservative	Melvin Mackie	120	19.5	+5.6
Liberal Democrats	Lynne Mayho	120	19.5	+5.4
Majority		255	41.5	
Turnout		615	36.9	−1.2
Labour hold		Swing		

Kendal Underley
Party	Candidate	Votes	%	±%
Labour	Charles Batteson	379	63.8	−23.5
Liberal Democrats	James McKeefery	121	20.4	+7.7
Conservative	Geoffrey Robson	94	15.8	N/A
Majority		258	43.4	
Turnout		594	39.6	+0.5
Labour hold		Swing		

Lakes Ambleside
Party	Candidate	Votes	%	±%
Liberal Democrats	Robert Barker*	580	46.8	+9.7
Conservative	Brian Barton	468	37.8	+19.1
Independent	George Middleton	190	15.3	−20.7
Majority		112	9.0	
Turnout		1,238	38.6	−0.4
Liberal Democrats hold		Swing		

Lakes Grasmere
Party	Candidate	Votes	%	±%
Independent	Elizabeth Braithwaite*	unopposed	N/A	−75.7
Majority		N/A	N/A	
Turnout		N/A	N/A	−38.6
Independent hold		Swing		

Sedbergh
Party	Candidate	Votes	%	±%
Conservative	Paul Winn	771	72.5	+16.7
Liberal Democrats	Sydney McLennan	292	27.5	+9.0
Majority		479	45.0	
Turnout		1,063	37.4	−3.2
Conservative hold		Swing		
