= 2011 South Lakeland District Council election =

2011 UK local government election

← 2010	5 May 2011	2012 →

19 of the 51 seats to South Lakeland District Council 26 seats needed for a majority
	First party	Second party	Third party
Party	Liberal Democrats	Conservative	Labour
Last election	34	16	1
Seats won	12	7	0
Seats after	32	18	1
Seat change	▼2	▲2	Steady
Popular vote	11,217	9,607	881
Percentage	51.3%	43.9%	4.0%
- Map showing the results of the 2011 South Lakeland District Council elections by ward. Liberal Democrats in yellow, Conservatives in blue, Labour in red. Wards in dark grey were not contested in 2011.
Council control before election
Liberal Democrats
Council control after election
Liberal Democrats

The 2011 South Lakeland District Council election took place on 5 May 2011 to elect members of South Lakeland District Council in Cumbria, England. One third of the council was up for election and the Liberal Democrats stayed in overall control of the council.

After the election, the composition of the council was:

- Liberal Democrat 32
- Conservative 18
- Labour 1

== Background ==
19 seats were contested at the election over 18 wards. 2 of these were by-elections, in Levens and in 1 of the 2 seats being fought in Ambleside and Grasmere. Both the Liberal Democrats and Conservatives stood in every seat, while Labour put up 8 candidates and the Green Party 2 candidates.

== Election result ==
The results saw the Liberal Democrats keep their majority on the council after losing 1 seat to the Conservatives. The only change came in Windermere Applethwaite and Troutbeck, with the Conservatives taking the seat by 12 votes after several recounts. This left the Liberal Democrats on 32 seats, compared to 18 for the Conservatives and 1 for Labour. Overall turnout in the election was 56.16%.

Party	Previous council	New council	+/-
Liberal Democrats	33	32	▼1
Conservatives	17	18	▲1
Labour	1	1	Steady
Total	51	51	
Working majority	15	13	

South Lakeland local election result 2011
Party	Seats	Gains	Losses	Net gain/loss	Seats %	Votes %	Votes	+/−
Liberal Democrats	12	0	1	-1	63.2	51.9	12,028	-8.2%
Conservative	7	1	0	+1	36.8	43.6	10,123	+10.0%
Labour	0	0	0	0	0	3.8	881	-1.7%
Green	0	0	0	0	0	0.7	162	-0.1%

== Ward results ==
Ambleside & Grasmere (2)
Party	Candidate	Votes	%	±%
Liberal Democrats	Vivienne Rees*	941	56.6	−10.3
Liberal Democrats	Heidi Halliday	811	48.8	−12.9
Conservative	Raymond Lane	592	35.6	+2.3
Conservative	Neil Salisbury	516	31.0	−0.8
Labour	Marilyn Molloy	159	9.6	+4.6
Majority		219	13.2	−20.3
Turnout		1,662	49.3	+6.7
Liberal Democrats hold		Swing		
Liberal Democrats hold		Swing		

Arnside & Beetham
Party	Candidate	Votes	%	±%
Liberal Democrats	Ian Stewart*	1,279	58.1	−0.1
Conservative	Gordon Fairclough	786	35.7	−2.4
Labour	Jim Barker	137	6.2	N/A
Majority		493	22.4	+2.3
Turnout		2,202	62.5	−0.2
Liberal Democrats hold		Swing		

Broughton
Party	Candidate	Votes	%	±%
Conservative	Joss Curwen*	750	75.8	+12.2
Liberal Democrats	Gary McClure	239	24.2	−12.2
Majority		511	51.7	+24.5
Turnout		989	54.1	−2.8
Conservative hold		Swing		

Burneside
Party	Candidate	Votes	%	±%
Liberal Democrats	Chris Holland	526	62.8	−11.9
Conservative	Colin Bell	250	29.9	+4.6
Labour	Lois Sparling	61	7.3	N/A
Majority		276	33.0	−16.4
Turnout		837	53.1	+4.7
Liberal Democrats hold		Swing		

Burton & Holme
Party	Candidate	Votes	%	±%
Conservative	Brian Cooper*	939	52.3	−2.1
Liberal Democrats	Vic Brown	857	47.7	+12.3
Majority		82	4.6	−14.4
Turnout		1,796	59.8	+2.7
Conservative hold		Swing		

Cartmel & Grange West
Party	Candidate	Votes	%	±%
Liberal Democrats	Mary Wilson*	604	65.4	±0.0
Conservative	Ian Curwen	319	34.6	±0.0
Majority		285	30.9	±0.0
Turnout		923	59.4	−1.8
Liberal Democrats hold		Swing		

Grange North
Party	Candidate	Votes	%	±%
Conservative	Andrew Gardiner	594	58.1	−4.7
Liberal Democrats	Barbara McCaffrey	428	41.9	+4.7
Majority		166	16.2	−9.3
Turnout		1,022	56.4	+7.0
Conservative hold		Swing		

Grange South
Party	Candidate	Votes	%	±%
Conservative	Tom Harvey*	529	53.8	+3.3
Liberal Democrats	Dorothy Lownds	454	46.2	−3.3
Majority		75	7.6	+6.7
Turnout		983	64.5	+1.9
Conservative hold		Swing		

Holker
Party	Candidate	Votes	%	±%
Liberal Democrats	Gill Gardner	516	55.4	−0.7
Conservative	Trevor Wilson	415	44.6	+0.7
Majority		101	10.8	−1.5
Turnout		931	58.1	+5.3
Liberal Democrats hold		Swing		

Levens (by-election)
Party	Candidate	Votes	%	±%
Liberal Democrats	Mary Orr	667	55.7	−8.4
Conservative	Grenville Evans	472	39.4	+3.5
Labour	Tony Rothwell	58	4.8	N/A
Majority		195	16.3	−12.0
Turnout		1,197	70.2	+3.0
Liberal Democrats hold		Swing		

Low Furness
Party	Candidate	Votes	%	±%
Conservative	James Airey*	437	65.3	+13.5
Liberal Democrats	Ray Beecham	132	19.7	−23.1
Green	Jo-anna Duncalf	100	14.9	+9.5
Majority		305	45.6	+36.6
Turnout		669	47.0	−7.4
Conservative hold		Swing		

Mid Furness
Party	Candidate	Votes	%	±%
Liberal Democrats	Janet Willis	694	41.7	−21.0
Conservative	Doreen Fell	648	38.9	+4.0
Labour	Colin Pickthall	262	15.7	+10.0
Green	Chris Loynes	62	3.7	N/A
Majority		46	2.8	−22.2
Turnout		1,666	52.4	+3.8
Liberal Democrats hold		Swing		

Sedbergh & Kirkby Lonsdale
Party	Candidate	Votes	%	±%
Liberal Democrats	Evelyn Westwood	1,424	51.8	+5.3
Conservative	Jules Drummond-Hay	1,323	48.2	+4.1
Majority		101	3.7	+1.3
Turnout		2,747	57.6	+1.0
Liberal Democrats hold		Swing		

Whinfell
Party	Candidate	Votes	%	±%
Liberal Democrats	Peter Thornton*	512	63.1	+0.9
Conservative	Mel Mackie	300	36.9	−0.9
Majority		212	26.1	+1.8
Turnout		812	54.3	+2.0
Liberal Democrats hold		Swing		

Windermere Applethwaite & Troutbeck
Party	Candidate	Votes	%	±%
Conservative	Ben Berry	480	50.6	+4.6
Liberal Democrats	Jo Stephenson*	468	49.4	−4.6
Majority		12	1.2	N/A
Turnout		948	58.6	+2.5
Conservative gain from Liberal Democrats		Swing		

Windermere Bowness North
Party	Candidate	Votes	%	±%
Liberal Democrats	Hilary Stephenson*	608	65.0	−9.2
Conservative	Michael Nicholson	280	29.9	+4.1
Labour	Kathleen Cross	47	5.0	N/A
Majority		328	35.1	−13.4
Turnout		935	57.0	+5.1
Liberal Democrats hold		Swing		

Windermere Bowness South
Party	Candidate	Votes	%	±%
Conservative	David Williams*	376	50.1	−15.1
Liberal Democrats	Stephen Rooke	331	44.1	+9.3
Labour	Rae Cross	43	5.7	N/A
Majority		45	6.0	−24.4
Turnout		750	44.9	+3.0
Conservative hold		Swing		

Windermere Town
Party	Candidate	Votes	%	±%
Liberal Democrats	Sandra Britton	537	69.9	−12.5
Conservative	Stephen Hall	117	15.2	−2.4
Labour	Penny Henderson	114	14.8	N/A
Majority		420	54.7	−10.1
Turnout		768	46.4	+5.3
Liberal Democrats hold		Swing		

== By-Elections ==
Windermere Town, 9 February 2012
Party	Candidate	Votes	%	±%
Liberal Democrats	Jo Stephenson	418	72.9	+3.0
Conservative	Sandra Lilley	85	14.8	−0.4
Labour	Penny Henderson	50	8.7	−6.1
UKIP	Robert Gibson	20	3.5	N/A
Majority		333	58.1	+3.4
Turnout		573	33.63	−12.8
Liberal Democrats hold		Swing		
