= 2003 South Lakeland District Council election =

2003 UK local government election

Results of the 2003 South Lakeland District Council election

The 2003 South Lakeland District Council election took place on 1 May 2003 to elect members of South Lakeland District Council in Cumbria, England. One third of the council was up for election and the council stayed under no overall control.

After the election, the composition of the council was:

- Liberal Democrat 23
- Conservative 18
- Labour 9
- Independent 2

== Background ==
Before the election the Liberal Democrats had 21 seats, the Conservatives 19, Labour 9 and independents 3. 17 seats were being contested with the Conservatives defending 10, the Liberal Democrats 6 and an independent 1 seat. 2 sitting Liberal Democrat councillors stood down at the election, Patricia Himsworth in Arnside and Beetham, and Claire Chorley in Burneside.

Major issues in the election included housing, regeneration, recycling, public toilets, affordable transport and refuse collection.

== Election result ==
The results saw the Liberal Democrats remain the largest party with 23 seats, but without a majority, after gaining 2 seats from the Conservatives in Cartmel and Low Furness & Swarthmoor and 1 seat from an independent in Whinfell. However the Conservatives did take 1 seat back from the Liberal Democrats in Arnside & Beetham to hold 18 seats. Labour remained on 9 seats, while independents dropped to 2 seats. Overall turnout in the election was 44%, with a low of 33.9% in Windermere Applethwaite to a high of 54.2% in Kirkby Lonsdale.

South Lakeland local election result 2003
Party	Seats	Gains	Losses	Net gain/loss	Seats %	Votes %	Votes	+/−
Conservative	9	1	2	-1	52.9	49.7	7,923	+19.1%
Liberal Democrats	8	3	1	+2	47.1	43.7	6,967	-2.1%
Independent	0	0	1	-1	0	5.4	854	+3.9%
Labour	0	0	0	0	0	1.2	198	-20.9%

== Ward results ==
Arnside and Beetham
Party	Candidate	Votes	%	±%
Conservative	Richard Rollins	906	47.3	+0.4
Liberal Democrats	Brenda Tidmarsh-Stephen	812	42.4	−6.4
Labour	Jocelyn Innes	198	10.3	N/A
Majority		94	4.9	
Turnout		1,916	54.1	+10.0
Conservative gain from Liberal Democrats		Swing		

Broughton
Party	Candidate	Votes	%	±%
Conservative	Joss Curwen*	700	75.7	−16.6
Liberal Democrats	John Humberstone	225	24.3	−68.0
Majority		475	51.4	
Turnout		925	48.9	+2.0
Conservative gain from Liberal Democrats		Swing		

- Joss Curwen was originally elected as a Liberal Democrat councillor.

Burneside
Party	Candidate	Votes	%	±%
Liberal Democrats	Frank Hodson	385	60.6	−23.0
Conservative	Stephen Procter	250	39.4	N/A
Majority		135	21.2	
Turnout		635	40.7	+7.6
Liberal Democrats hold		Swing		

Cartmel
Party	Candidate	Votes	%	±%
Liberal Democrats	Howard Martin	364	54.2	N/A
Conservative	Leslie Hadwin*	308	45.8	+45.8
Majority		56	8.4	
Turnout		672	44.6	+44.6
Liberal Democrats gain from Independent		Swing		

- Leslie Hadwin was originally elected unopposed as an Independent councillor.

Crake Valley
Party	Candidate	Votes	%	±%
Liberal Democrats	Noel Spendlove*	360	65.9	−2.7
Conservative	Robert Webster	186	34.1	+2.7
Majority		174	31.8	
Turnout		546	37.9	−3.4
Liberal Democrats hold		Swing		

Crooklands
Party	Candidate	Votes	%	±%
Conservative	John Galbraith	440	51.0	−20.0
Liberal Democrats	Sheila Eccles	423	49.0	+27.8
Majority		17	2.0	
Turnout		863	49.0	+11.4
Conservative hold		Swing		

Grange
Party	Candidate	Votes	%	±%
Conservative	Reginald Parker	907	53.0	−3.1
Liberal Democrats	Ronald Shapland	803	47.0	+9.0
Majority		104	6.0	
Turnout		1,710	46.7	+1.2
Conservative hold		Swing		

Holker
Party	Candidate	Votes	%	±%
Conservative	John Manning*	519	67.8	N/A
Liberal Democrats	Susan Rawsthorn	246	32.2	N/A
Majority		273	35.6	
Turnout		765	51.9	+51.9
Conservative gain from Independent		Swing		

- John Manning had previously been elected in a by-election.

Kirkby Lonsdale
Party	Candidate	Votes	%	±%
Conservative	Barclay Stainton	629	61.2	−4.6
Independent	Alan Day	338	32.9	N/A
Liberal Democrats	Christopher Lansdowne	61	5.9	N/A
Majority		291	28.3	
Turnout		1,028	54.2	+0.6
Conservative hold		Swing		

Lakes Ambleside
Party	Candidate	Votes	%	±%
Liberal Democrats	David Vatcher*	499	45.1	−0.5
Conservative	Brian Barton	480	43.4	+24.7
Independent	George Middleton	127	11.5	−24.5
Majority		19	1.7	
Turnout		1,106	36.2	−2.8
Liberal Democrats hold		Swing		

Low Furness & Swarthmoor
Party	Candidate	Votes	%	±%
Liberal Democrats	Sonjie Marshall	710	52.6	−1.0
Conservative	William Tyson*	640	47.4	+23.4
Majority		70	5.2	
Turnout		1,350	39.7	+1.5
Liberal Democrats hold		Swing		

- William Tyson had been elected at a by-election for the Conservative Party.

Sedbergh
Party	Candidate	Votes	%	±%
Conservative	Kevin Lancaster*	697	71.4	+11.2
Liberal Democrats	Sydney McLennan	279	28.6	+10.1
Majority		418	42.8	
Turnout		976	34.5	−6.1
Conservative hold		Swing		

Whinfell
Party	Candidate	Votes	%	±%
Liberal Democrats	Peter Thornton	489	55.7	N/A
Independent	William Robinson*	389	44.3	+44.3
Majority		110	11.4	
Turnout		878	48.2	+48.2
Liberal Democrats gain from Independent		Swing		

Windermere Applethwaite
Party	Candidate	Votes	%	±%
Conservative	Jennifer Borer*	343	60.7	−0.2
Liberal Democrats	Audrey Ahmad	222	39.3	+0.2
Majority		121	21.4	
Turnout		565	33.9	−2.1
Conservative hold		Swing		

Windermere Bowness North
Party	Candidate	Votes	%	±%
Liberal Democrats	Deidre Cranwell*	478	57.1	+4.3
Conservative	Martin Hall	359	42.9	+9.1
Majority		119	14.2	
Turnout		837	52.7	+5.7
Liberal Democrats hold		Swing		

Windermere Bowness South
Party	Candidate	Votes	%	±%
Conservative	Jane Hoyle*	410	75.9	+16.6
Liberal Democrats	Helen Scott-Parker	130	24.1	−16.6
Majority		280	51.8	
Turnout		540	38.5	+2.0
Conservative hold		Swing		

Windermere Town
Party	Candidate	Votes	%	±%
Liberal Democrats	Kathleen Atkinson*	481	76.3	+27.7
Conservative	Elizabeth Graham	149	23.7	−12.4
Majority		332	52.6	
Turnout		630	37.4	−3.5
Liberal Democrats hold		Swing		
