= 2015 South Lakeland District Council election =

2015 UK local government election

← 2014	7 May 2015	2016 →

17 of the 51 seats to South Lakeland District Council 26 seats needed for a majority
	First party	Second party
Party	Liberal Democrats	Conservative
Last election	33	15
Seats won	9	7
Seats after	32	15
Seat change	▼1	Steady
Popular vote	10,986	11,362
Percentage	40.1%	41.5%
	Third party	Fourth party
Party	Labour	Independent
Last election	3	0
Seats won	0	1
Seats after	3	1
Seat change	Steady	▲1
Popular vote	1,687	569
Percentage	6.2%	2.1%
- Map showing the results of the 2015 South Lakeland District Council elections by ward. Liberal Democrats in yellow, Conservatives in blue, Independent in light grey. Wards in dark grey were not contested in 2015.
Council control before election
Liberal Democrats
Council control after election
Liberal Democrats

The 2015 South Lakeland District Council election took place on 7 May 2015 to elect members of the South Lakeland District Council in England. It was held on the same day as other local elections.

== Election results summary ==
Party	Previous council	New council	+/-
Liberal Democrats	33	32	▼1
Conservatives	15	15	Steady
Labour	3	3	Steady
Independent	0	1	▲1
Total	51	51	
Working majority	15	13	

South Lakeland local election result 2015
Party	Seats	Gains	Losses	Net gain/loss	Seats %	Votes %	Votes	+/−
Conservative	7	2	2	0	41.2	41.5	11,362	
Liberal Democrats	9	1	2	-1	52.9	40.1	10,986	
Green	0	0	0	0	0	8.1	2,207	
Labour	0	0	0	0	0	6.2	1,687	
Independent	1	1	0	+1	5.9	2.1	569	
UKIP	0	0	0	0	0	2.1	564	

== Ward results ==
Ambleside & Grasmere
Party	Candidate	Votes	%	±%
Liberal Democrats	Vivienne Rees*	1,002	48.3	−8.3
Conservative	Hannah Lane	635	30.6	−5.0
Green	Simon Dunning	268	12.9	N/A
Labour	Alison Gilchrist	171	8.2	−1.4
Majority		367	17.7	−3.3
Turnout			70.44	+21.1
Liberal Democrats hold		Swing		

Arnside & Beetham
Party	Candidate	Votes	%	±%
Liberal Democrats	Ian Stewart*	1,356	49.8	−8.3
Conservative	Peter Smillie	1,005	36.9	+1.2
Green	Mark Arrowsmith	195	7.2	N/A
Labour	Lois Sparling	168	6.2	±0.0
Majority		351	12.9	−9.5
Turnout			77.22	+14.7
Liberal Democrats hold		Swing		

Broughton
Party	Candidate	Votes	%	±%
Independent	Joss Curwen*	569	40.7	−35.1
Conservative	John Longmire	550	39.3	−36.5
Labour	John Lawrence	155	11.1	N/A
Green	Donna Munro	125	8.9	N/A
Majority		19	1.4	N/A
Turnout			75.48	+21.4
Independent gain from Conservative		Swing		

- Joss Curwen was originally elected as a Conservative councillor.

Burneside
Party	Candidate	Votes	%	±%
Liberal Democrats	Keith Hurst-Jones	478	40.3	−22.5
Conservative	Nigel Byrom	360	30.4	+0.5
Green	Christopher Granger	159	13.4	N/A
UKIP	Malcolm Nightingale	103	8.7	N/A
Labour	Tony Rothwell	86	7.3	±0.0
Majority		118	9.9	−23.1
Turnout			70.87	+17.8
Liberal Democrats hold		Swing		

Burton & Holme
Party	Candidate	Votes	%	±%
Conservative	Brian Cooper*	1,232	53.9	+1.6
Liberal Democrats	Vic Brown	765	33.4	−14.3
Labour	Nigel Warner	186	8.1	N/A
Green	Adam Sandell	104	4.5	N/A
Majority		467	20.5	+15.9
Turnout			75.57	+15.8
Conservative hold		Swing		

Cartmel & Grange West
Party	Candidate	Votes	%	±%
Liberal Democrats	Mary Wilson*	582	48.7	−16.7
Conservative	Ted Walsh	462	38.7	+4.1
Green	Chris Gibbs	150	12.6	N/A
Majority		120	10.0	−20.9
Turnout			75.11	+15.7
Liberal Democrats hold		Swing		

Grange North
Party	Candidate	Votes	%	±%
Liberal Democrats	Eric Morrell	623	44.8	+2.9
Conservative	Steve Chambers	511	36.7	−21.4
Green	Jenny Gibbs	155	11.1	N/A
UKIP	Stephen Willmott	102	7.3	N/A
Majority		112	8.1	N/A
Turnout			75.82	+19.4
Liberal Democrats gain from Conservative		Swing		

Grange South
Party	Candidate	Votes	%	±%
Conservative	Tom Harvey*	701	61.4	+7.6
Liberal Democrats	Dave Khan	277	24.3	−21.9
Green	Ben Barker	163	14.3	N/A
Majority		424	37.1	+29.5
Turnout			76.05	+11.6
Conservative hold		Swing		

Holker
Party	Candidate	Votes	%	±%
Liberal Democrats	Gill Gardner	687	62.6	+7.2
Conservative	Grania Nicholson	335	30.5	−14.1
Green	Jocelyn Gaskell	75	6.8	N/A
Majority		352	32.1	+21.3
Turnout			68.07	+10.0
Liberal Democrats hold		Swing		

Low Furness
Party	Candidate	Votes	%	±%
Conservative	James Airey*	618	56.4	−8.9
UKIP	Janet Butler	160	14.6	N/A
Labour	Joan Casson	132	12.0	N/A
Liberal Democrats	Loraine Birchall	128	11.7	−8.0
Green	Christian Barnes	58	5.3	−9.6
Majority		458	41.8	−3.8
Turnout			74.78	+27.8
Conservative hold		Swing		

Mid Furness
Party	Candidate	Votes	%	±%
Conservative	Andrew Butcher	871	37.3	−1.6
Liberal Democrats	Janet Willis*	845	36.2	−5.5
Labour	David Webster	330	14.1	−1.6
UKIP	Peter Richards	199	8.5	N/A
Green	Bill Shaw	89	3.8	+0.1
Majority		26	1.1	N/A
Turnout			73.97	+21.6
Conservative gain from Liberal Democrats		Swing		

Sedbergh & Kirkby Lonsdale
Party	Candidate	Votes	%	±%
Conservative	Mel Mackie	1,622	43.7	−4.5
Liberal Democrats	Evelyn Westwood*	1,619	43.6	−8.2
Green	Daphne Jackson	269	7.2	N/A
Labour	Martin Holborn	205	5.5	N/A
Majority		3	0.1	N/A
Turnout			76.44	+18.8
Conservative gain from Liberal Democrats		Swing		

Whinfell
Party	Candidate	Votes	%	±%
Liberal Democrats	Peter Thornton*	592	47.6	−15.5
Conservative	Pat Bell	560	45.0	+8.1
Green	Adam Rubinstein	92	7.4	N/A
Majority		32	2.6	−23.5
Turnout			80.17	+25.9
Liberal Democrats hold		Swing		

Windermere Applethwaite & Troutbeck
Party	Candidate	Votes	%	±%
Conservative	Ben Berry*	686	57.7	+7.1
Liberal Democrats	Andrew Jarvis	399	33.6	−15.8
Green	Kate Barkes	104	8.7	N/A
Majority		287	24.1	+22.9
Turnout			72.61	+14.0
Conservative hold		Swing		

Windermere Bowness North
Party	Candidate	Votes	%	±%
Liberal Democrats	Colin Jones*	582	49.0	−16.0
Conservative	Sandra Lilley	463	39.0	+9.1
Labour	Alan Ellison	72	6.1	+1.1
Green	Kate Threadgold	71	6.0	N/A
Majority		119	10.0	−25.1
Turnout			73.80	+16.8
Liberal Democrats hold		Swing		

Windermere Bowness South
Party	Candidate	Votes	%	±%
Conservative	David Williams*	498	48.3	−1.8
Liberal Democrats	Steve Rooke	420	40.7	−3.4
Green	Tim Shearer	63	6.1	N/A
Labour	Rae Cross	50	4.8	−0.9
Majority		78	7.6	+1.6
Turnout			73.80	+28.9
Conservative hold		Swing		

Windermere Town
Party	Candidate	Votes	%	±%
Liberal Democrats	Dyan Jones*	631	58.3	−11.6
Conservative	Adrian Naik	253	23.4	+8.2
Labour	Penny Henderson	132	12.2	−2.6
Green	Luke Barley	67	6.2	N/A
Majority		378	34.9	−19.8
Turnout			64.80	+18.4
Liberal Democrats hold		Swing		

== By-Elections ==
No by-elections were held between 2015 and 2016.
