= 2007 South Lakeland District Council election =

2007 UK local government election

Results of the 2007 South Lakeland District Council election

The 2007 South Lakeland District Council election took place on 3 May 2007 to elect members of South Lakeland District Council in Cumbria, England. One third of the council was up for election and the Liberal Democrats stayed in overall control of the council.

After the election, the composition of the council was:

- Liberal Democrat 34
- Conservative 15
- Labour 2
- Independent 1

== Background ==
At the last election in 2006 the Liberal Democrats gained a majority on the council for the first time. Both they and the Conservatives stood in all of the 17, mainly rural, seats that were being contested in 2007. A Save Our NHS Group stood in 5 seats to campaign against local health cuts, along with 2 candidates from the Labour Party and 1 from the Green Party. Councillors who stood down at the election included 4 Conservatives and 1 Liberal Democrat, Gill Cranwell, vice chair of the council.

Issues in the election included cuts in services, hospital closures and secrecy in local government.

== Election result ==
The results saw the Liberal Democrats remain in control with an increased majority, gaining 3 seats to have 34 councillors. They took the seats of Arnside and Beetham, Crooklands and Windermere Applethwaite from the Conservatives, to leave the Conservatives with 15 councillors. 2 of the gains came in seats where the Conservative councillors had stood down at the election, while in Windermere Applethwaite Jennifer Borer was defeated by 333 votes to 488. Overall turnout in the election was 53.74%.

South Lakeland local election result 2007
Party	Seats	Gains	Losses	Net gain/loss	Seats %	Votes %	Votes	+/−
Liberal Democrats	11	3	0	+3	64.7	57.0	11,009	-9.4%
Conservative	6	0	3	-3	35.3	40.8	7,874	+18.0%
Save Our NHS Group	0	0	0	0	0	1.3	257	+0.3%
Green	0	0	0	0	0	0.6	114	+0.4%
Labour	0	0	0	0	0	0.3	60	-7.7%

== Ward results ==
Arnside and Beetham
Party	Candidate	Votes	%	±%
Liberal Democrats	Prudence Jupe	1,516	69.6	+27.2
Conservative	David Clark	661	30.4	−16.9
Majority		855	39.2	
Turnout		2,177	61.6	+7.5
Liberal Democrats gain from Conservative		Swing		

Broughton
Party	Candidate	Votes	%	±%
Conservative	Joss Curwen*	662	63.7	−12.0
Liberal Democrats	Barry Rabone	378	36.3	+12.0
Majority		284	27.4	−24.0
Turnout		1,040	55.7	+6.8
Conservative hold		Swing		

Burneside
Party	Candidate	Votes	%	±%
Liberal Democrats	Frank Hodson*	532	64.6	+4.0
Conservative	James Alexander	275	33.4	−6.0
Save Our NHS Group	Leonard Edgar	17	2.1	N/A
Majority		257	31.2	+10.0
Turnout		824	53.5	+12.8
Liberal Democrats hold		Swing		

Cartmel
Party	Candidate	Votes	%	±%
Liberal Democrats	Howard Martin*	556	69.7	+15.5
Conservative	Ted Walsh	242	30.3	−15.5
Majority		314	39.4	+31.0
Turnout		798	53.6	+9.0
Liberal Democrats hold		Swing		

Crake Valley
Party	Candidate	Votes	%	±%
Liberal Democrats	Betty Spendlove	482	60.4	−5.5
Conservative	Wendy Barry	316	39.6	+5.5
Majority		166	20.8	−11.0
Turnout		798	54.3	+16.4
Liberal Democrats hold		Swing		

Crooklands
Party	Candidate	Votes	%	±%
Liberal Democrats	Sheila Eccles	664	58.8	+9.8
Conservative	James Airey	465	41.2	−9.8
Majority		199	17.6	
Turnout		1,129	63.0	+14.0
Liberal Democrats gain from Conservative		Swing		

Grange
Party	Candidate	Votes	%	±%
Conservative	Tom Harvey	916	46.6	−6.4
Liberal Democrats	Robert Leach	891	45.3	−1.7
Save Our NHS Group	Andrew Billson-Page	158	8.0	N/A
Majority		25	1.4	−4.6
Turnout		1,965	54.5	+7.8
Conservative hold		Swing		

Holker
Party	Candidate	Votes	%	±%
Conservative	Jack Manning*	408	54.8	−13.0
Liberal Democrats	Maureen Nicholson	337	45.2	+13.0
Majority		71	9.5	−26.1
Turnout		745	50.5	−1.4
Conservative hold		Swing		

Kirkby Lonsdale
Party	Candidate	Votes	%	±%
Conservative	Rodger Read*	520	53.3	−7.9
Liberal Democrats	Maria Radice	455	46.7	+40.8
Majority		65	6.6	−21.7
Turnout		975	52.3	−1.9
Conservative hold		Swing		

Lakes Ambleside
Party	Candidate	Votes	%	±%
Liberal Democrats	David Vatcher*	987	73.8	+28.7
Conservative	Alan Piper	303	22.6	−20.8
Save Our NHS Group	Jane Wilkinson	48	3.6	N/A
Majority		684	51.2	+49.5
Turnout		1,338	46.1	+9.9
Liberal Democrats hold		Swing		

Low Furness & Swarthmoor
Party	Candidate	Votes	%	±%
Liberal Democrats	Sonjie Marshall*	866	52.3	−0.3
Conservative	Jim Webster	677	40.9	−6.5
Green	Jo-Anna Duncalf	114	6.9	N/A
Majority		189	11.4	+6.2
Turnout		1,657	48.3	+8.6
Liberal Democrats hold		Swing		

Sedbergh
Party	Candidate	Votes	%	±%
Conservative	Kevin Lancaster*	867	52.3	−19.1
Liberal Democrats	Peter Woof	791	47.7	+19.1
Majority		76	4.6	−38.2
Turnout		1,658	59.9	+25.4
Conservative hold		Swing		

Whinfell
Party	Candidate	Votes	%	±%
Liberal Democrats	Peter Thornton*	669	63.5	+7.8
Conservative	Pat Bell	385	36.5	N/A
Majority		284	27.0	+15.6
Turnout		1,054	56.7	+8.5
Liberal Democrats hold		Swing		

Windermere Applethwaite
Party	Candidate	Votes	%	±%
Liberal Democrats	Maggie Bridge	488	59.4	+20.1
Conservative	Jennifer Borer*	333	40.6	−20.1
Majority		155	18.8	
Turnout		821	50.8	+16.9
Liberal Democrats gain from Conservative		Swing		

Windermere Bowness North
Party	Candidate	Votes	%	±%
Liberal Democrats	Hilary Stephenson	625	59.9	+2.8
Conservative	Johnnie Curwen	377	36.1	−6.8
Labour	Helen Sowerby	28	2.7	N/A
Save Our NHS Group	Anna Billson-Page	13	1.2	N/A
Majority		248	23.8	+9.6
Turnout		1,043	63.1	+10.4
Liberal Democrats hold		Swing		

Windermere Bowness South
Party	Candidate	Votes	%	±%
Conservative	David Williams	366	61.5	−14.4
Liberal Democrats	Dyan Jones	229	38.5	+14.4
Majority		137	23.0	−28.8
Turnout		595	42.1	+3.6
Conservative hold		Swing		

Windermere Town
Party	Candidate	Votes	%	±%
Liberal Democrats	Kathleen Atkinson	543	76.8	+0.5
Conservative	Yvonne Stewart-Taylor	101	14.3	−9.4
Labour	Stephen Thomas	32	4.5	N/A
Save Our NHS Group	Charles Batteson	31	4.4	N/A
Majority		442	62.5	+9.9
Turnout		707	42.1	+4.7
Liberal Democrats hold		Swing		
