= 2008 South Lakeland District Council election =

2008 UK local government election

← 2007	1 May 2008	2010 →

All 51 seats to South Lakeland District Council 26 seats needed for a majority
	First party	Second party	Third party
Party	Liberal Democrats	Conservative	Labour
Seats won	36	14	1
Popular vote	24,355	16,100	1,387
Percentage	57.9%	38.3%	3.3%
- Map showing the results of the 2008 South Lakeland District Council elections by ward. Liberal Democrats in yellow, Conservatives in blue, Labour in red.
Council control before election
Liberal Democrats
Council control after election
Liberal Democrats

The 2008 South Lakeland District Council election took place on 1 May 2008 to elect members of South Lakeland District Council in Cumbria, England. The whole council was up for election with boundary changes since the last election in 2007 reducing the number of seats by 1. The Liberal Democrats stayed in overall control of the council.

== Background ==
Since the last election in 2007 boundary changes had taken place reducing the number of seats from 52 to 51. Among the changes made was the combining of the Sedbergh and Kirkby Lonsdale wards.

Before the election the Liberal Democrats ran the council with 31 seats, compared to 16 for the Conservatives, 2 for Labour, 1 Green Party and 1 independent. Among the sitting councillors to stand down at the election was the only independent David Foot.

== Election result ==
The results saw the Liberal Democrats increase their majority on the council finishing the election up on 36 councillors. This came at the expense of the Conservatives who dropped to 14 seats and Labour who lost 1 of their 2 councillors. Meanwhile, the Green Party also lost their only seat in Kendal Far Cross.

Party	Previous council	New council	+/-
Liberal Democrats	33	36	▲3
Conservatives	17	14	▼3
Labour	2	1	Steady
Green	1	0	Steady
Independent	1	0	Steady
Total	51	51	
Working majority	12	21	

South Lakeland local election result 2008
Party	Seats	Gains	Losses	Net gain/loss	Seats %	Votes %	Votes	+/−
Liberal Democrats	36			+4	70.6	57.4	30,627	+0.4%
Conservative	14			-2	27.5	39.6	21,111	-1.2%
Labour	1			-1	2.0	2.6	1,387	+2.3%
Green	0			-1	0	0.4	228	-0.2%
Independent	0			-1	0	0	0	0

== Ward results ==
Ambleside & Grasmere (2)
Party	Candidate	Votes	%	±%
Liberal Democrats	Vivienne Rees*	1,140	66.9	
Liberal Democrats	David Vatcher*	1,113	65.3	
Conservative	Brian Barton	542	31.8	
Conservative	Tim Brown	518	30.4	
Majority		571	33.5	
Turnout		1,704	42.6	

Arnside & Beetham (2)
Party	Candidate	Votes	%	±%
Liberal Democrats	Pru Jupe*	1,337	60.2	
Liberal Democrats	Ian Stewart*	1,292	58.2	
Conservative	Peter Fisher	845	38.1	
Conservative	Sue Blonsky	836	37.7	
Majority		447	20.1	
Turnout		2,220	62.7	

Broughton
Party	Candidate	Votes	%	±%
Conservative	Joss Curwen*	667	63.6	
Liberal Democrats	Barry Rabone	382	36.4	
Majority		285	27.2	
Turnout		1,049	56.9	

Burneside
Party	Candidate	Votes	%	±%
Liberal Democrats	Frank Hodson*	578	74.7	
Conservative	Eric Wright	196	25.3	
Majority		382	49.4	
Turnout		774	48.4	

Burton & Holme (2)
Party	Candidate	Votes	%	±%
Conservative	Roger Bingham*	1,132	67.2	
Conservative	Brian Cooper	916	54.4	
Liberal Democrats	Geoff Johnston	597	35.4	
Liberal Democrats	Scott Chandler	524	31.1	
Majority		319	19.0	
Turnout		1,685	57.1	

Cartmel & Grange West
Party	Candidate	Votes	%	±%
Liberal Democrats	Mary Wilson	617	65.4	
Conservative	Steve Chambers	326	34.6	
Majority		291	30.9	
Turnout		943	61.2	

Coniston & Crake Valley
Party	Candidate	Votes	%	±%
Conservative	Anne Hall*	518	64.0	
Liberal Democrats	John Hemingway	291	36.0	
Majority		227	28.1	
Turnout		809	59.3	

Crooklands
Party	Candidate	Votes	%	±%
Liberal Democrats	Sheila Eccles*	803	70.4	
Conservative	Rob Cocker*	338	29.6	
Majority		465	40.8	
Turnout		1,141	64.8	

- Rob Cocker was originally elected as a Liberal Democrat councillor.

Grange North
Party	Candidate	Votes	%	±%
Conservative	Bill Wearing*	580	62.8	
Liberal Democrats	Russell Boardman	344	37.2	
Majority		236	25.5	
Turnout		924	49.4	

Grange South
Party	Candidate	Votes	%	±%
Conservative	Tom Harvey*	501	50.5	
Liberal Democrats	Anluise Hamilton-Bruce	492	49.5	
Majority		9	0.9	
Turnout		993	62.6	

Hawkshead
Party	Candidate	Votes	%	±%
Liberal Democrats	Colin Davies	486	53.5	
Conservative	Claire Salisbury	422	46.5	
Majority		64	7.0	
Turnout		908	60.4	

Holker
Party	Candidate	Votes	%	±%
Liberal Democrats	Maureen Nicholson	471	56.1	
Conservative	Ruth Airey	368	43.9	
Majority		103	12.3	
Turnout		839	52.8	

Kendal Castle
Party	Candidate	Votes	%	±%
Liberal Democrats	Sonia Lawson*	617	69.3	
Conservative	James Alexander	273	30.7	
Majority		344	38.7	
Turnout		890	56.7	

Kendal Far Cross
Party	Candidate	Votes	%	±%
Liberal Democrats	Clive Graham*	478	65.1	
Conservative	Lyndsay Slater	147	20.0	
Green	Enda Farrell*	109	14.9	
Majority		331	45.1	
Turnout		734	44.6	

- Enda Farrell was originally elected as a Liberal Democrat councillor.

Kendal Fell
Party	Candidate	Votes	%	±%
Liberal Democrats	Paul Little*	508	70.4	
Conservative	Diana Crewdson	133	18.4	
Labour	Lois Sparling	81	11.2	
Majority		375	51.9	
Turnout		722	44.0	

Kendal Heron Hill
Party	Candidate	Votes	%	±%
Liberal Democrats	Andy Shine*	640	77.6	
Conservative	Ian Tomlinson	185	22.4	
Majority		455	55.2	
Turnout		825	54.2	

Kendal Highgate
Party	Candidate	Votes	%	±%
Liberal Democrats	Chris Hogg	537	82.9	
Conservative	Deborah Huck	111	17.1	
Majority		426	65.7	
Turnout		648	39.7	

Kendal Kirkland
Party	Candidate	Votes	%	±%
Liberal Democrats	Julie Dawson	412	68.4	
Labour	Robert Rothwell	112	18.6	
Conservative	Elizabeth Cartmell	78	13.0	
Majority		300	49.8	
Turnout		602	36.2	

Kendal Mintsfeet
Party	Candidate	Votes	%	±%
Liberal Democrats	Jonathan Brook*	587	82.0	
Conservative	Margaret Williams	129	18.0	
Majority		458	64.0	
Turnout		716	45.3	

Kendal Nether
Party	Candidate	Votes	%	±%
Liberal Democrats	Clare Feeney-Johnson*	702	85.2	
Conservative	William Parker	122	14.8	
Majority		580	70.4	
Turnout		824	49.2	

Kendal Oxenholme & Natland
Party	Candidate	Votes	%	±%
Liberal Democrats	Brenda Gray*	596	68.2	
Conservative	Nigel Byrom	278	31.8	
Majority		318	36.4	
Turnout		874	54.1	

Kendal Parks
Party	Candidate	Votes	%	±%
Liberal Democrats	Brendon Jameson*	568	79.4	
Conservative	Peter Birchall	147	20.6	
Majority		421	58.9	
Turnout		715	41.8	

Kendal Romney
Party	Candidate	Votes	%	±%
Liberal Democrats	Graham Vincent*	615	80.2	
Conservative	Pam Flitcroft	152	19.8	
Majority		463	60.4	
Turnout		767	45.4	

Kendal Stonecross
Party	Candidate	Votes	%	±%
Liberal Democrats	Sylvia Emmott*	743	82.9	
Conservative	Jack Tomlinson	153	17.1	
Majority		590	65.8	
Turnout		896	55.2	

Kendal Strickland
Party	Candidate	Votes	%	±%
Liberal Democrats	Stephen Coleman*	611	83.9	
Conservative	Kate Williams	117	16.1	
Majority		494	67.9	
Turnout		728	48.8	

Kendal Underley
Party	Candidate	Votes	%	±%
Liberal Democrats	Gwen Murfin*	541	69.1	
Labour	Paul Braithwaite	125	16.0	
Conservative	Alan Price	117	14.9	
Majority		416	53.1	
Turnout		783	47.2	

Levens
Party	Candidate	Votes	%	±%
Liberal Democrats	Brenda Woof*	737	64.1	
Conservative	Alisa Hulme	412	35.9	
Majority		325	28.3	
Turnout		1,149	67.2	

Low Furness
Party	Candidate	Votes	%	±%
Conservative	James Airey	415	51.8	
Liberal Democrats	Ray Beecham	343	42.8	
Green	Jo-Anna Duncalf	43	5.4	
Majority		72	9.0	
Turnout		801	54.4	

Lyth Valley
Party	Candidate	Votes	%	±%
Liberal Democrats	Rosie Ballantyne-Smith	585	55.6	
Conservative	Robin Brown*	467	44.4	
Majority		118	11.2	
Turnout		1,052	57.6	

Mid Furness (2)
Party	Candidate	Votes	%	±%
Liberal Democrats	Jackie Cooper	969	62.7	
Liberal Democrats	Jane Carson	925	59.9	
Conservative	Wendy Barry	539	34.9	
Conservative	Anne Fisher	404	26.1	
Labour	Bharath Rajan	88	5.7	
Majority		386	25.0	
Turnout		1,545	48.6	

Milnthorpe
Party	Candidate	Votes	%	±%
Liberal Democrats	Alan Baverstock	681	75.4	
Conservative	Mike Coyle	222	24.6	
Majority		459	50.8	
Turnout		903	54.1	

Sedbergh & Kirkby Lonsdale (3)
Party	Candidate	Votes	%	±%
Conservative	Kevin Lancaster*	1,432	52.2	
Liberal Democrats	Peter Woof	1,274	46.5	
Liberal Democrats	Ian McPherson	1,245	45.4	
Conservative	Rodger Read*	1,210	44.1	
Liberal Democrats	Fenner Pearson	1,183	43.1	
Conservative	Anne Fenwick	1,127	41.1	
Majority		35	1.3	
Turnout		2,742	56.6	

Staveley-in-Cartmel
Party	Candidate	Votes	%	±%
Liberal Democrats	Clive Leal	462	52.6	
Conservative	Ted Walsh	416	47.4	
Majority		46	5.2	
Turnout		878	55.7	

Staveley-in-Westmorland
Party	Candidate	Votes	%	±%
Liberal Democrats	Stan Collins*	724	80.1	
Conservative	Angela Wright	180	19.9	
Majority		544	60.2	
Turnout		904	53.4	

Ulverston Central
Party	Candidate	Votes	%	±%
Conservative	Norman Bishop-Rowe*	292	57.4	
Labour	Roy Gill	159	31.2	
Liberal Democrats	John Humberstone	58	11.4	
Majority		133	26.1	
Turnout		509	33.0	

Ulverston East
Party	Candidate	Votes	%	±%
Labour	John Wilson	208	44.2	
Conservative	Peter Hornby	189	40.1	
Liberal Democrats	Ronald Edmondson	74	15.7	
Majority		19	4.0	
Turnout		471	29.4	

Ulverston North
Party	Candidate	Votes	%	±%
Conservative	Colin Hodgson*	388	55.3	
Labour	Joan Casson	166	23.6	
Green	Simon Filmore	76	10.8	
Liberal Democrats	Charley Darbishire	72	10.3	
Majority		222	31.6	
Turnout		702	46.8	

Ulverston South
Party	Candidate	Votes	%	±%
Conservative	Brian Wilkinson*	398	64.9	
Labour	Judith Pickthall	133	21.7	
Liberal Democrats	Celia Birchall	82	13.4	
Majority		265	43.2	
Turnout		613	40.9	

Ulverston Town
Party	Candidate	Votes	%	±%
Conservative	Jamie Samson	208	43.5	
Labour	Colin Williams	204	42.7	
Liberal Democrats	Barbara Rabone	66	13.8	
Majority		4	0.8	
Turnout		478	32.9	

Ulverston West
Party	Candidate	Votes	%	±%
Conservative	Janette Jenkinson*	448	70.0	
Labour	Colin Pickthall	111	17.3	
Liberal Democrats	Loraine Birchall	81	12.7	
Majority		337	52.7	
Turnout		640	41.2	

Whinfell
Party	Candidate	Votes	%	±%
Liberal Democrats	Peter Thornton*	488	62.2	
Conservative	Mel Mackie	297	37.8	
Majority		191	24.3	
Turnout		785	52.3	

Windermere Applethwaite & Troutbeck
Party	Candidate	Votes	%	±%
Liberal Democrats	Jo Stephenson	518	54.0	
Conservative	Michael Nicholson	442	46.0	
Majority		76	7.9	
Turnout		960	56.1	

Windermere Bowness North
Party	Candidate	Votes	%	±%
Liberal Democrats	Hilary Stephenson*	654	74.2	
Conservative	Stephen Hall	227	25.8	
Majority		427	48.5	
Turnout		881	51.9	

Windermere Bowness South
Party	Candidate	Votes	%	±%
Conservative	David Williams*	433	65.2	
Liberal Democrats	Dyan Jones	231	34.8	
Majority		202	30.4	
Turnout		664	41.9	

Windermere Town
Party	Candidate	Votes	%	±%
Liberal Democrats	Kath Atkinson*	553	82.4	
Conservative	Enid Robinson	118	17.6	
Majority		435	64.8	
Turnout		671	41.1	
