= 2016 South Lakeland District Council election =

2016 UK local government election

← 2015	5 May 2016	2018 →

17 of the 51 seats to South Lakeland District Council 26 seats needed for a majority
	First party	Second party
Party	Liberal Democrats	Conservative
Last election	32	15
Seats won	8	7
Seats after	32	16
Seat change	Steady	▲1
Popular vote	7,108	5,787
Percentage	44.5%	36.3%
	Third party	Fourth party
Party	Labour	Independent
Last election	3	1
Seats won	2	0
Seats after	2	1
Seat change	▼1	Steady
Popular vote	1,725	0
Percentage	10.8%	0.0%
- Map showing the results of the 2016 South Lakeland District Council elections by ward. Liberal Democrats in yellow, Conservatives in blue, Independent in light grey. Wards in dark grey were not contested in 2016.
Council control before election
Liberal Democrats
Council control after election
Liberal Democrats

The 2016 South Lakeland District Council election took place on 5 May 2016 to elect members of South Lakeland District Council in England. This was on the same day as other local elections.

This result had the following consequences for the total number of seats on the Council after the elections:

Party	Previous council	New council	+/-
Liberal Democrats	32	32	Steady
Conservatives	15	16	▲1
Labour	3	2	▼1
Independent	1	1	Steady
Green	0	0	Steady
UKIP	0	0	Steady
Total	51	51	
Working majority	13	13	

== Election results summary ==
South Lakeland local election result 2016
Party	Seats	Gains	Losses	Net gain/loss	Seats %	Votes %	Votes	+/−
Liberal Democrats	8	0	0	0	47.1	44.5	7,108	
Conservative	7	1	0	+1	41.2	36.3	5,787	
Labour	2	0	1	-1	11.8	10.8	1,725	
Green	0	0	0	0	0	5.7	903	
UKIP	0	0	0	0	0	2.7	434	

== Ward results ==
An asterisk * indicates an incumbent seeking re-election.

=== Arnside & Beetham ===
Arnside & Beetham 2016
Party	Candidate	Votes	%	±%
Liberal Democrats	Pete McSweeney	1,220	65.2	−5.3
Conservative	Peter Smillie	399	21.3	−8.2
UKIP	Alan Nigel Piper	93	5.0	N/A
Green	Jill Abel	82	4.4	N/A
Labour	Lois Katherine Sparling	77	4.1	N/A
Majority		821	43.9	+2.9
Turnout			54.5	+3.7
Liberal Democrats hold		Swing		

=== Burton & Holme ===
Burton & Holme 2016
Party	Candidate	Votes	%	±%
Conservative	Roger Kenneth Bingham*	919	65.8	+6.0
Liberal Democrats	Gordon Victor Higton	308	22.0	−18.2
Labour	Nigel Edward Warner	111	7.9	N/A
Green	Andrew Robert Chapple	59	4.2	N/A
Majority		611	43.8	+24.2
Turnout			47.2	−7.0
Conservative hold		Swing		

=== Coniston & Crake Valley ===
Coniston & Crake Valley 2016
Party	Candidate	Votes	%	±%
Conservative	Anne Hall*	391	63.9	+3.9
Liberal Democrats	Val Sykes	172	28.1	−11.9
Green	Mark Kidd	49	8.0	N/A
Majority		219	35.8	+15.8
Turnout			47.9	−5.6
Conservative hold		Swing		

=== Crooklands ===
Crooklands 2016
Party	Candidate	Votes	%	±%
Liberal Democrats	Sheila Eccles*	611	64.2	−2.3
Conservative	David Matthews	263	27.7	−1.9
Green	Meg Hill	45	4.7	+0.8
UKIP	Malcolm James Hamilton Nightingale	32	3.4	N/A
Majority		348	36.5	−0.4
Turnout			54.2	+3.5
Liberal Democrats hold		Swing		

=== Hawkshead ===
Hawkshead 2016
Party	Candidate	Votes	%	±%
Liberal Democrats	David William Norman Fletcher*	478	58.1	+4.7
Conservative	Ann Elizabeth Myatt	240	29.2	−10.3
UKIP	David Rimmer Walker	55	6.7	N/A
Green	Gwen Harrison	50	6.1	−1.0
Majority		238	28.9	+15.0
Turnout			57.9	+5.7
Liberal Democrats hold		Swing		

=== Levens ===
Levens 2016
Party	Candidate	Votes	%	±%
Liberal Democrats	Annie Rawlinson*	715	65.2	+9.4
Conservative	Kevin Ronald Holmes	323	29.4	−10.8
UKIP	Yana Doidge	21	1.9	N/A
Labour	Dave Cope	19	1.7	N/A
Green	Claire Wickham	19	1.7	−2.3
Majority		392	35.8	+20.2
Turnout			64.1	−3.4
Liberal Democrats hold		Swing		

=== Lyth Valley ===
Lyth Valley 2016
Party	Candidate	Votes	%	±%
Conservative	John Holmes*	482	59.6	−2.2
Liberal Democrats	Bex Cooper	220	27.2	−6.1
UKIP	Stephen Willmott	43	5.3	N/A
Labour	Alison Faith Gilchrist	34	4.2	−0.7
Green	Kate Barkes	30	3.7	N/A
Majority		262	32.4	+3.9
Turnout			44.7	−9.5
Conservative hold		Swing		

=== Milnthorpe ===
Milnthorpe 2016
Party	Candidate	Votes	%	±%
Liberal Democrats	Rupert James Audland	482	58.9	−8.0
Conservative	Steven Hurst	253	30.9	+3.1
UKIP	Oksana Walker	40	4.9	N/A
Labour	Jo Magne	33	4.0	N/A
Green	Shona Kathleen Kidd	11	1.3	−4.0
Majority		229	28.0	−11.1
Turnout			49.8	−2.5
Liberal Democrats hold		Swing		

=== Sedbergh & Kirkby Lonsdale ===
Sedbergh & Kirkby Lonsdale 2016
Party	Candidate	Votes	%	±%
Liberal Democrats	Nick Cotton*	1,557	61.4	+13.9
Conservative	Alex Toubas	779	30.7	−14.0
Labour	Nick Cross	114	4.5	+0.4
Green	Daphne Mary Jackson	84	3.3	−0.4
Majority		778	30.7	+27.9
Turnout			53.5	+2.6
Liberal Democrats hold		Swing		

=== Staveley-in-Cartmel ===
Staveley-in-Cartmel 2016
Party	Candidate	Votes	%	±%
Liberal Democrats	Sue Sanderson*	512	62.7	+5.9
Conservative	Ted Walsh	220	27.0	−16.2
UKIP	Brian Donald Thornton	57	7.0	N/A
Green	Ben John Barker	27	3.3	N/A
Majority		292	35.7	+22.1
Turnout			52.7	+3.3
Liberal Democrats hold		Swing		

=== Staveley-in-Westmorland ===
Staveley-in-Westmorland 2016
Party	Candidate	Votes	%	±%
Liberal Democrats	Stan Collins*	486	58.9	−13.2
Conservative	Harry Taylor	125	15.2	−3.8
Green	Fran Richardson	112	13.6	+4.7
Labour	Peter Train	68	8.2	N/A
UKIP	Albina Thornton	34	4.1	N/A
Majority		361	43.7	−9.4
Turnout			47.2	±0.0
Liberal Democrats hold		Swing		

=== Ulverston Central ===
Ulverston Central 2016
Party	Candidate	Votes	%	±%
Conservative	Norman Bishop-Rowe	204	42.5	+0.6
Labour	Bharath Sundara Rajan*	187	39.0	−3.3
Liberal Democrats	Andrew Hudson	64	13.3	+4.3
Green	Christopher Loynes	25	5.2	−1.6
Majority		17	3.5	N/A
Turnout			33.3	+0.2
Conservative gain from Labour		Swing		

=== Ulverston East ===
Ulverston East 2016
Party	Candidate	Votes	%	±%
Labour	Mark Wilson*	259	51.9	+0.1
Conservative	Peter Hornby	143	28.7	+1.8
Green	Judith Ann Filmore	53	10.6	+3.1
Liberal Democrats	Maureen Frances Nicholson	44	8.8	+3.2
Majority		116	23.2	−1.7
Turnout			31.6	+6.5
Labour hold		Swing		

=== Ulverston North ===
Ulverston North 2016
Party	Candidate	Votes	%	±%
Conservative	Helen Irving*	252	35.7	−3.7
Labour	Judith Ann Pickthall	249	35.3	+0.4
Green	Simon James Filmore	110	15.6	−0.4
Liberal Democrats	Ray Beecham	95	13.5	+3.8
Majority		3	0.4	−4.1
Turnout			46.1	−0.2
Conservative hold		Swing		

=== Ulverston South ===
Ulverston South 2016
Party	Candidate	Votes	%	±%
Conservative	Amanda Rigg*	268	47.9	+0.2
Labour	Joan Margaret Casson	144	25.7	−16.2
UKIP	Peter Richards	59	10.5	N/A
Green	Bob Gerry	45	8.0	+1.8
Liberal Democrats	Loraine Birchall	44	7.9	+3.7
Majority		124	22.2	+16.4
Turnout			38.1	+4.6
Conservative hold		Swing		

=== Ulverston Town ===
Ulverston Town 2016
Party	Candidate	Votes	%	±%
Labour	John Victor Clough*	272	52.4	−1.7
Conservative	Reuben Allonby	137	26.4	−3.5
Green	Bill Shaw	68	13.1	+3.1
Liberal Democrats	Dave Khan	42	8.1	+2.1
Majority		135	26.0	+1.8
Turnout			35.4	+1.6
Labour hold		Swing		

=== Ulverston West ===
Ulverston West 2016
Party	Candidate	Votes	%	±%
Conservative	Janette Ethel Jenkinson*	389	60.9	−2.3
Labour	Bob Brown	158	24.7	+0.3
Liberal Democrats	Gordon Ellis Brown	58	9.1	+4.8
Green	Robert O'Hara	34	5.3	−2.8
Majority		231	36.2	−2.6
Turnout			43.6	+3.6
Conservative hold		Swing		

== By-Elections ==
Windermere Bowness North, 13 October 2016
Party	Candidate	Votes	%	±%
Liberal Democrats	Andrew Jarvis	441	60.1	+11.1
Conservative	Martin Hall	256	34.9	−4.1
Green	Kate Threadgold	37	5.0	−1.0
Majority		185	25.2	+15.2
Turnout		740	45.8	−28.0
Liberal Democrats hold		Swing		

Ambleside & Grasmere, 4 May 2017
Party	Candidate	Votes	%	±%
Liberal Democrats	Vicky Hughes	695	50.9	−13.4
Conservative	Tim Brown	502	36.7	+14.0
Labour	Alison Gilchrist	87	6.4	−0.1
Green	Chris Rowley	82	6.0	−0.4
Majority		193	14.2	−27.4
Turnout		1,372	46.76	+1.17
Liberal Democrats hold		Swing		
