= 2014 South Lakeland District Council election =

2014 UK local government election

| ← 2012 | 22 May 2014 | 2015 → |

17 of the 51 seats to South Lakeland District Council 26 seats needed for a majority
| | First party | Second party | Third party |
|---|---|---|---|
| Party | Liberal Democrats | Conservative | Labour |
| Last election | 34 | 14 | 3 |
| Seats won | 15 | 2 | 0 |
| Seats after | 33 | 15 | 3 |
| Seat change | ▼1 | ▲1 | Steady |
| Popular vote | 8,805 | 3,876 | 1,339 |
| Percentage | 55.8% | 24.6% | 8.5% |
- Map showing the results of the 2014 South Lakeland District Council elections by ward. Liberal Democrats in yellow and Conservatives in blue. Wards in dark grey were not contested in 2014.
Council control before election
Liberal Democrats
Council control after election
Liberal Democrats

The 2014 South Lakeland District Council election took place on 22 May 2014 to elect members of South Lakeland District Council in England. This was on the same day as other local elections.

== Election results summary ==
| Party | Previous council | New council | +/- |
|---|---|---|---|
| Liberal Democrats | 33 | 33 | Steady |
| Conservatives | 14 | 15 | ▲1 |
| Labour | 3 | 3 | Steady |
| Independent | 1 | 0 | ▼1 |
| Total | 51 | 51 | |
| Working majority | 15 | 15 | |

South Lakeland local election result 2014
| Party | Seats | Gains | Losses | Net gain/loss | Seats % | Votes % | Votes | +/− |
|---|---|---|---|---|---|---|---|---|
| Liberal Democrats | 15 | 0 | 1 | -1 | 88.2 | 55.8 | 8,805 | |
| Conservative | 2 | 1 | 0 | +1 | 11.8 | 24.6 | 3,876 | |
| Green | 0 | 0 | 0 | 0 | 0 | 8.6 | 1,356 | |
| Labour | 0 | 0 | 0 | 0 | 0 | 8.5 | 1,339 | |
| UKIP | 0 | 0 | 0 | 0 | 0 | 1.7 | 266 | |
| Independent | 0 | 0 | 0 | 0 | 0 | 0.8 | 125 | |

== Ward results ==
Ambleside & Grasmere
| Party | Candidate | Votes | % | ±% |
|---|---|---|---|---|
| Liberal Democrats | Heidi Halliday | 828 | 64.3 | +2.6 |
| Conservative | Jessie Alston | 293 | 22.7 | −10.6 |
| Labour | Rebecca Costello | 84 | 6.5 | +1.5 |
| Green | Angela Towers | 83 | 6.4 | N/A |
| Majority | | 535 | 41.6 | +13.2 |
| Turnout | | | 45.59 | −16.5 |
| Liberal Democrats hold | | Swing | | |

Kendal Castle
| Party | Candidate | Votes | % | ±% |
|---|---|---|---|---|
| Liberal Democrats | Chris Hogg | 442 | 62.7 | −5.9 |
| Conservative | Eric Hookway | 159 | 22.6 | −8.8 |
| Green | Liz Ashburn | 58 | 8.2 | N/A |
| UKIP | Paul Martin | 46 | 6.5 | N/A |
| Majority | | 283 | 40.1 | +2.8 |
| Turnout | | | 47.89 | −29.0 |
| Liberal Democrats hold | | Swing | | |

Kendal Far Cross
| Party | Candidate | Votes | % | ±% |
|---|---|---|---|---|
| Liberal Democrats | Shirley Evans | 479 | 71.6 | +10.9 |
| Conservative | Lyndsay Slater | 92 | 13.8 | −14.2 |
| Green | Daphne Jackson | 59 | 8.8 | N/A |
| Labour | Ian Law | 39 | 5.5 | −5.5 |
| Majority | | 387 | 57.8 | +25.1 |
| Turnout | | | 43.50 | −24.0 |
| Liberal Democrats hold | | Swing | | |

Kendal Fell
| Party | Candidate | Votes | % | ±% |
|---|---|---|---|---|
| Liberal Democrats | Giles Archibald* | 527 | 60.0 | −15.3 |
| Green | Gwen Harrison | 175 | 19.9 | N/A |
| Labour | Virginia Branney | 111 | 12.6 | −12.1 |
| Conservative | Micky Pierson | 66 | 7.5 | N/A |
| Majority | | 352 | 40.1 | −10.6 |
| Turnout | | | 52.07 | −14.2 |
| Liberal Democrats hold | | Swing | | |

Kendal Heron Hill
| Party | Candidate | Votes | % | ±% |
|---|---|---|---|---|
| Liberal Democrats | Phil Walker | 489 | 63.3 | −9.3 |
| Conservative | Paul Rodman | 186 | 24.1 | −3.3 |
| Green | Gwen Harrison | 57 | 7.4 | N/A |
| Labour | Gwen Harrison | 40 | 5.2 | N/A |
| Majority | | 303 | 39.2 | −5.9 |
| Turnout | | | 50.79 | −28.5 |
| Liberal Democrats hold | | Swing | | |

Kendal Highgate
| Party | Candidate | Votes | % | ±% |
|---|---|---|---|---|
| Liberal Democrats | Philip Dixon* | 413 | 54.3 | −10.8 |
| Labour | Marilyn Molloy | 153 | 20.1 | +7.7 |
| Green | Rachael Passant-Coy | 107 | 14.1 | N/A |
| Conservative | Bill Wearing | 87 | 11.4 | −11.1 |
| Majority | | 260 | 34.2 | −8.4 |
| Turnout | | | 43.18 | −23.8 |
| Liberal Democrats hold | | Swing | | |

Kendal Kirkland
| Party | Candidate | Votes | % | ±% |
|---|---|---|---|---|
| Liberal Democrats | Alvin Finch | 483 | 72.5 | +12.4 |
| Conservative | Elizabeth Cartmell | 69 | 10.4 | −10.1 |
| Labour | Tony Rothwell | 69 | 10.4 | −9.1 |
| Green | Chris Rowley | 45 | 6.8 | N/A |
| Majority | | 414 | 62.1 | +22.5 |
| Turnout | | | 39.22 | −23.1 |
| Liberal Democrats hold | | Swing | | |

Kendal Mintsfeet
| Party | Candidate | Votes | % | ±% |
|---|---|---|---|---|
| Liberal Democrats | David Evans* | 431 | 62.9 | −8.9 |
| Green | Karen Mitchell | 96 | 14.0 | N/A |
| Conservative | Ian Keeling | 80 | 11.7 | −16.5 |
| Labour | Jim Barker | 78 | 11.4 | N/A |
| Majority | | 335 | 48.9 | +5.3 |
| Turnout | | | 43.63 | −30.0 |
| Liberal Democrats hold | | Swing | | |

Kendal Nether
| Party | Candidate | Votes | % | ±% |
|---|---|---|---|---|
| Liberal Democrats | Clare Feeney-Johnson* | 538 | 72.1 | +2.9 |
| Conservative | Derrick Wade | 99 | 13.3 | −10.5 |
| Green | Andy Mason | 58 | 7.8 | N/A |
| Labour | Alison Gilchrist | 51 | 6.8 | −0.2 |
| Majority | | 439 | 58.8 | +13.4 |
| Turnout | | | 45.71 | −29.4 |
| Liberal Democrats hold | | Swing | | |

Kendle Oxenholme & Natland
| Party | Candidate | Votes | % | ±% |
|---|---|---|---|---|
| Liberal Democrats | Brenda Gray* | 477 | 54.3 | +0.3 |
| Conservative | Patrick Birchall | 281 | 32.0 | −10.0 |
| Labour | John Bateson | 62 | 7.1 | +3.2 |
| Green | Jocelyn Gaskell | 58 | 6.6 | N/A |
| Majority | | 196 | 22.3 | +10.3 |
| Turnout | | | 49.89 | −37.6 |
| Liberal Democrats hold | | Swing | | |

Kendal Parks
| Party | Candidate | Votes | % | ±% |
|---|---|---|---|---|
| Liberal Democrats | Jonathan Brook* | 425 | 55.6 | −9.5 |
| Conservative | Nigel Byrom | 230 | 30.1 | +3.6 |
| Green | Mandy Barnett | 67 | 8.8 | N/A |
| Labour | Florence Scullard | 42 | 5.5 | −2.9 |
| Majority | | 195 | 25.5 | −13.2 |
| Turnout | | | 45.45 | −26.6 |
| Liberal Democrats hold | | Swing | | |

Kendal Romney
| Party | Candidate | Votes | % | ±% |
|---|---|---|---|---|
| Liberal Democrats | Graham Vincent* | 423 | 62.3 | −0.6 |
| Conservative | Mike Nicholson | 120 | 17.7 | −9.6 |
| Labour | Dave Cope | 70 | 10.3 | +0.5 |
| Green | Adam Sandell | 66 | 9.7 | N/A |
| Majority | | 303 | 44.6 | +9.0 |
| Turnout | | | 41.00 | −30.9 |
| Liberal Democrats hold | | Swing | | |

Kendal Stonecross
| Party | Candidate | Votes | % | ±% |
|---|---|---|---|---|
| Liberal Democrats | Sylvia Emmott* | 540 | 63.8 | −1.4 |
| Conservative | Mel Mackie | 137 | 16.2 | −13.0 |
| UKIP | Stephen Willmott | 78 | 9.2 | N/A |
| Labour | Lois Sparling | 46 | 5.4 | −0.1 |
| Green | Rory Black | 45 | 5.3 | N/A |
| Majority | | 403 | 47.6 | +11.6 |
| Turnout | | | 51.90 | −28.7 |
| Liberal Democrats hold | | Swing | | |

Kendal Strickland
| Party | Candidate | Votes | % | ±% |
|---|---|---|---|---|
| Liberal Democrats | Stephen Coleman* | 405 | 57.4 | −7.8 |
| Green | Kate Willshaw | 87 | 12.3 | N/A |
| Conservative | Stephen Chambers | 76 | 10.8 | −13.8 |
| Labour | Jim Ring | 73 | 10.3 | +0.1 |
| UKIP | Malcolm Nightingale | 65 | 9.2 | N/A |
| Majority | | 318 | 45.1 | +4.6 |
| Turnout | | | 48.29 | −27.2 |
| Liberal Democrats hold | | Swing | | |

Kendal Underley
| Party | Candidate | Votes | % | ±% |
|---|---|---|---|---|
| Liberal Democrats | Matt Severn | 368 | 46.3 | −14.0 |
| Independent | Rob Boden* | 125 | 15.7 | −44.6 |
| Labour | Paul Braithwaite | 114 | 14.4 | −0.5 |
| UKIP | Susan Bownass | 77 | 9.7 | N/A |
| Conservative | Karen Dawson | 56 | 7.1 | −17.7 |
| Green | Vanessa Moss | 54 | 6.8 | N/A |
| Majority | | 243 | 30.6 | −5.0 |
| Turnout | | | 47.92 | −21.3 |
| Liberal Democrats hold | | Swing | | |

- Rob Boden was originally elected as a Liberal Democrat.

Mid Furness
| Party | Candidate | Votes | % | ±% |
|---|---|---|---|---|
| Conservative | Caroline Airey* | 643 | 46.0 | −2.8 |
| Liberal Democrats | Loraine Birchall | 462 | 33.0 | −9.5 |
| Labour | David Webster | 195 | 13.9 | N/A |
| Green | Chris Loynes | 98 | 7.0 | −1.7 |
| Majority | | 181 | 13.0 | +6.7 |
| Turnout | | | 44.86 | −28.3 |
| Conservative hold | | Swing | | |

Sedbergh & Kirkby Lonsdale
| Party | Candidate | Votes | % | ±% |
|---|---|---|---|---|
| Conservative | Kevin Lancaster | 1,202 | 47.5 | +3.0 |
| Liberal Democrats | Ron Bulman | 1,075 | 42.5 | −9.1 |
| Green | Andi Chapple | 143 | 5.6 | N/A |
| Labour | Martin Holborn | 112 | 4.4 | +0.6 |
| Majority | | 127 | 5.0 | N/A |
| Turnout | | | 53.03 | −25.1 |
| Conservative gain from Liberal Democrats | | Swing | | |

== By-Elections ==
Windermere Town, 2 October 2014
| Party | Candidate | Votes | % | ±% |
|---|---|---|---|---|
| Liberal Democrats | Dyan Jones | 416 | 64.0 | −5.9 |
| Conservative | Sandra Lilley | 184 | 28.3 | +13.1 |
| Green | Gwen Harrison | 50 | 7.7 | N/A |
| Majority | | 232 | 35.7 | −19.0 |
| Turnout | | 650 | 39.42 | −7.2 |
| Liberal Democrats hold | | Swing | | |
