= 1998 South Lakeland District Council election =

1998 UK local government election

The 1998 South Lakeland District Council election took place on 7 May 1998 to elect members of South Lakeland District Council in Cumbria, England. One third of the council was up for election and the council stayed under no overall control.

After the election, the composition of the council was:

- Liberal Democrat 20
- Conservative 13
- Labour 10
- Independent 9

== Election result ==
South Lakeland local election result 1998
| Party | Seats | Gains | Losses | Net gain/loss | Seats % | Votes % | Votes | +/− |
|---|---|---|---|---|---|---|---|---|
| Labour | 6 | | | +2 | 35.3 | | | |
| Liberal Democrats | 6 | | | -2 | 35.3 | | | |
| Conservative | 3 | | | +1 | 17.6 | | | |
| Independent | 2 | | | -1 | 11.8 | | | |
