= 2019 South Lakeland District Council election =

2019 UK local government election

- 2 May 2019

16 of the 51 seats to South Lakeland District Council 26 seats needed for a majority
- Turnout: 45.06%
	First party	Second party
Party	Liberal Democrats	Conservative
Last election	29	19
Seats won	12	2
Seats after	32	15
Seat change	▲3	▼4
Popular vote	15,140	11,130
Percentage	45.2%	33.2%
	Third party	Fourth party
Party	Labour	Green
Last election	3	0
Seats won	1	1
Seats after	3	1
Seat change	Steady	▲1
Popular vote	2,631	4,262
Percentage	7.8%	12.7%
- Map showing the results of the 2019 South Lakeland District Council elections by ward. Liberal Democrats in yellow, Conservatives in blue, Labour in red. Wards in dark grey were not contested in 2019.
Council control before election
Liberal Democrats
Council control after election
Liberal Democrats

The 2019 South Lakeland District Council election took place on 2 May 2019 to elect members of South Lakeland District Council in Cumbria, England. One third of the council was up for election.

== Results ==
Party	Previous council	New council	+/-
Liberal Democrats	29	32	▲3
Conservatives	19	15	▼4
Labour	3	3	Steady
Green	0	1	▲1
Total	51	51	
Working majority	7	13	

South Lakeland Election 2019
Party	Seats	Gains	Losses	Net gain/loss	Seats %	Votes %	Votes	+/−
Liberal Democrats	32	3	0	+3	62.75	45.16	15,140	+4.16
Conservative	15	0	4	-4	29.41	33.20	11,130	-7.72
Labour	3	0	0	0	5.88	7.85	2,631	-2.27
Green	1	1	0	+1	1.96	12.71	4,262	+5.02
Independent	0	0	0	0	0.00	0.56	187	+0.29
UKIP	0	0	0	0	0.00	0.53	177	New

== Ward results ==
=== Ambleside & Grasmere ===
Ambleside & Grasmere 2019
Party	Candidate	Votes	%	±%
Liberal Democrats	Malcolm Lamb	735	53.5	+0.7
Conservative	Tim Brown	398	29.0	+2.0
Green	Christina Birch	176	12.8	+2.8
Labour	Joshua Gilroy	64	4.7	−2.6
Majority		337	24.5	−1.3
Turnout			42.6	−0.1
Rejected ballots		14		
Liberal Democrats hold		Swing		

=== Arnside & Milnthorpe ===
Arnside & Milnthorpe 2019
Party	Candidate	Votes	%	±%
Liberal Democrats	Pete McSweeney*	1,339	58.3	+5.4
Conservative	Rachel Ashburner	616	26.8	−6.8
Green	Jill Abel	269	11.7	−1.3
Labour	Alison Gilchrist	73	3.2	−1.9
Majority		723	31.5	+12.7
Turnout			46.6	−6.0
Rejected ballots		19		
Liberal Democrats hold		Swing		

=== Bowness & Levens ===
Bowness & Levens 2019
Party	Candidate	Votes	%	±%
Conservative	Brian Rendell	1,084	50.0	−1.8
Liberal Democrats	Steve Bavin	823	37.9	+8.9
Green	Helen Bentley	208	9.6	−3.8
Labour	Kate Tordorff	54	2.5	−4.4
Majority		261	12.1	−10.7
Turnout			46.3	−1.0
Rejected ballots		21		
Conservative hold		Swing		

=== Broughton & Coniston ===
Broughton & Coniston 2019
Party	Candidate	Votes	%	±%
Liberal Democrats	Ian Wharton	878	40.5	+5.1
Conservative	Matt Brereton*	830	38.2	−1.0
UKIP	Alan Piper	177	8.2	N/A
Green	Lynette Gilligan	170	7.8	−1.6
Labour	Paul Martin	115	5.3	−1.4
Majority		48	2.3	N/A
Turnout			44.0	−4.8
Rejected ballots		10		
Liberal Democrats gain from Conservative		Swing		

=== Burton & Crooklands ===
Burton & Crooklands 2019
Party	Candidate	Votes	%	±%
Conservative	Tom Harvey*	1,012	47.7	+1.0
Liberal Democrats	Christine Herbert	839	39.5	+4.7
Green	Simon Blunden	200	9.4	+4.2
Labour	Jim Ring	71	3.3	−3.4
Majority		273	8.2	−0.3
Turnout			45.5	−8.3
Rejected ballots		24		
Conservative hold		Swing		

=== Furness Peninsula ===
Furness Peninsula 2019
Party	Candidate	Votes	%	±%
Liberal Democrats	Janet Willis	801	45.5	+5.8
Conservative	Andrew Butcher*	641	36.4	−6.6
Labour	Eirik Hunt	181	10.3	+0.4
Green	Peter Howlett	139	7.9	−0.5
Majority		160	9.1	N/A
Turnout			39.3	−4.5
Rejected ballots		30		
Liberal Democrats gain from Conservative		Swing		

=== Grange ===
Grange 2019
Party	Candidate	Votes	%	±%
Liberal Democrats	Dave Khan*	1,366	57.7	+12.9
Conservative	Daniel Asplin	665	28.1	−10.9
Green	Robin Le Mare	202	8.5	−2.4
Labour	Paul Casson	134	5.7	−1.9
Majority		701	29.6	+27.1
Turnout			51.6	−2.5
Rejected ballots		33		
Liberal Democrats hold		Swing		

=== Kendal East ===
Kendal East 2019
Party	Candidate	Votes	%	±%
Liberal Democrats	Helen Ladhams*	1,148	53.6	+14.3
Conservative	James Alexander	619	28.9	−6.9
Green	Paul Woods	209	9.8	+3.0
Labour	Helen Stafford	167	7.8	−2.3
Majority		529	24.7	+21.2
Turnout			42.7	−1.3
Rejected ballots		21		
Liberal Democrats hold		Swing		

=== Kendal Rural ===
Kendal Rural 2019
Party	Candidate	Votes	%	±%
Liberal Democrats	Hazel Hodgson*	1,173	50.5	+13.2
Conservative	Mike Nicholson	744	32.0	−2.9
Green	Fran Richardson	316	13.6	−0.3
Labour	Hanna Burke	90	3.9	−3.3
Majority		429	18.5	+16.1
Turnout			48.8	−0.7
Rejected ballots		28		
Liberal Democrats hold		Swing		

=== Kendal South & Natland ===
Kendal South & Natland 2019
Party	Candidate	Votes	%	±%
Liberal Democrats	Doug Rathbone*	1,333	56.3	+14.8
Conservative	John Waddington	772	32.6	−6.0
Green	Elsa Fuster	166	7.0	+2.1
Labour	Lois Sparling	96	4.1	−3.0
Majority		561	23.7	+20.8
Turnout			48.6	−1.0
Rejected ballots		14		
Liberal Democrats hold		Swing		

=== Kendal Town ===
Kendal Town 2019
Party	Candidate	Votes	%	±%
Liberal Democrats	Phil Dixon*	905	40.9	−3.5
Green	Ian Rodham	787	35.6	+25.6
Conservative	Aron Taylor	299	13.5	−5.2
Labour	Paul Braithwaite	222	10.0	−9.0
Majority		118	5.3	−19.9
Turnout			45.3	−0.4
Rejected ballots		13		
Liberal Democrats hold		Swing		

=== Kendal West ===
Kendal West 2019
Party	Candidate	Votes	%	±%
Liberal Democrats	Susanne Long	1,021	51.3	+11.9
Conservative	Hannah Lane	383	19.2	−12.2
Green	Claire Wickham	207	7.0	−2.6
Labour	Trevor Batchelor	192	9.6	−5.7
Independent	Graham Vincent*	187	9.4	−30.0
Majority		638	32.1	+24.1
Turnout			39.0	−2.0
Rejected ballots		12		
Liberal Democrats hold		Swing		

=== Sedbergh & Kirkby Lonsdale ===
Sedbergh & Kirkby Lonsdale 2019
Party	Candidate	Votes	%	±%
Liberal Democrats	Suzie Pye	1,332	51.0	+8.1
Conservative	Sheila Capstick*	1,072	41.1	−1.9
Green	Daphne Jackson	131	5.0	−0.1
Labour	Nick Cross	76	2.9	−3.1
Majority		260	9.9	N/A
Turnout			55.1	+4.7
Rejected ballots		28		
Liberal Democrats gain from Conservative		Swing		

=== Ulverston East ===
Ulverston East 2019
Party	Candidate	Votes	%	±%
Labour	Shirley-Anne Wilson	608	43.6	−2.7
Conservative	Maf Servante Haddow	399	28.6	−7.4
Green	Chris Loynes	200	14.3	−2.6
Liberal Democrats	Andrew Hudson	188	13.5	−0.4
Majority		209	15.0	+4.7
Turnout			31.4	−2.9
Rejected ballots		27		
Labour hold		Swing		

=== Ulverston West ===
Ulverston West 2019
Party	Candidate	Votes	%	±%
Green	Judy Filmore	756	37.0	+12.8
Conservative	Amanda Rigg*	748	36.6	−9.6
Labour	Sharon Webster	374	18.3	−12.0
Liberal Democrats	Ray Beecham	164	8.0	−4.0
Majority		8	0.4	N/A
Turnout			45.5	+0.9
Rejected ballots		19		
Green gain from Conservative		Swing		

=== Windermere ===
Windermere 2019
Party	Candidate	Votes	%	±%
Liberal Democrats	Dyan Jones*	1,095	50.2	+7.2
Conservative	Jane Hoyle	848	38.8	−1.7
Green	Kate Threadgold	126	5.8	−1.7
Labour	Penny Henderson	114	5.2	−4.4
Majority		247	11.4	+8.9
Turnout			47.6	−3.1
Rejected ballots		31		
Liberal Democrats hold		Swing		

== Changes 2019–2023 ==
- On 1 April 2023, South Lakeland District Council was abolished and its functions transferred to Westmorland and Furness Council.
- Elections in Broughton & Coniston, Furness Peninsula, Grange and Kendal Rural, originally scheduled for 2020, were postponed and held on 6 May 2021.

=== Elections delayed from 2020 ===
==== Broughton & Coniston ====
Broughton & Coniston, 6 May 2021
Party	Candidate	Votes	%	±%
Liberal Democrats	Heather Troughton	1,317	51.9	+11.4
Conservative	Matt Brereton	977	38.5	+0.3
Green	Lynette Gilligan	136	5.4	−2.4
Labour	Paul Martin	108	4.3	−1.0
Majority		340	13.4	+11.1
Turnout			50.6	+6.6
Rejected ballots		5		
Liberal Democrats gain from Conservative		Swing		

==== Furness Peninsula ====
Furness Peninsula, 6 May 2021
Party	Candidate	Votes	%	±%
Conservative	Ben Cooper	939	45.7	+9.3
Liberal Democrats	Loraine Birchall	790	38.4	−7.1
Labour	Sharon Webster	216	10.5	+0.2
Green	Peter Howlett	111	5.4	−2.5
Majority		149	7.3	N/A
Turnout			44.9	+5.6
Rejected ballots		7		
Conservative hold		Swing		

==== Grange ====
Grange, 6 May 2021
Party	Candidate	Votes	%	±%
Liberal Democrats	Pete Endsor	1,427	60.2	+2.5
Conservative	Aron Taylor	627	26.4	−1.7
Green	Robin Le Mare	163	6.9	−1.6
Labour	Ben Barker	155	6.5	+0.8
Majority		800	33.8	+4.2
Turnout			50.3	−1.3
Rejected ballots		10		
Liberal Democrats hold		Swing		

==== Kendal Rural ====
Kendal Rural, 6 May 2021
Party	Candidate	Votes	%	±%
Liberal Democrats	Ali Jama	1,206	52.1	+1.6
Conservative	Luke Gudgeon	794	34.3	+2.3
Green	Frances Richardson	239	10.3	−3.3
Labour	Hanna Burke	74	3.2	−0.7
Majority		412	17.8	−0.7
Turnout			47.3	−1.5
Rejected ballots		13		
Liberal Democrats hold		Swing		

== By-elections ==
=== Grange ===
Grange, 12 August 2021
Party	Candidate	Votes	%	±%
Liberal Democrats	Fiona Hanlon	1,336	66.2	+8.5
Conservative	Steve Chambers	541	26.8	−1.3
Green	Robin Le Mare	85	4.2	−4.3
Labour	Patricia Wright	56	2.8	−2.9
Majority		795	39.4	
Turnout		2,022	42.9	−8.7
Rejected ballots		4		
Liberal Democrats hold		Swing		

The by-election followed the resignation of Liberal Democrat councillor Dave Khan, who had been elected in the 2018 South Lakeland District Council election to one of the three seats representing Grange ward.

=== Kendal North ===
Kendal North, 23 September 2021
Party	Candidate	Votes	%	±%
Liberal Democrats	Jonathan Cornthwaite	622	46.9	+12.2
Green	Liz Hendry	527	39.8	+9.9
Conservative	Aron Taylor	122	9.2	−14.6
Labour	Virginia Branney	54	4.1	−11.1
Majority		95	7.1	+2.3
Turnout			39.5	−7.9
Registered electors		3,374		
Rejected ballots		6		
Liberal Democrats hold		Swing		

The by-election followed the resignation of Liberal Democrat councillor Jonathan Owen, who joined the Green Party and had been elected in the 2018 South Lakeland District Council election to one of the two seats representing Kendal North ward.
