= 2018 South Lakeland District Council election =

2018 UK local government election

- 3 May 2018

All 51 seats to South Lakeland District Council 26 seats needed for a majority
	First party	Second party	Third party
Party	Liberal Democrats	Conservative	Labour
Last election	32	16	2
Seats won	29	19	3
Seat change	▼3	▲3	▲1
Popular vote	43,860	43,777	10,828
Percentage	41.0%	40.9%	10.1%
- Map showing the results of the 2018 South Lakeland District Council elections by ward. Liberal Democrats in yellow, Conservatives in blue, Labour in red. Striped wards indicate mixed representation.
Council control before election
Liberal Democrats
Council control after election
Liberal Democrats

The 2018 South Lakeland District Council election took place on 3 May 2018 to elect members of South Lakeland District Council in Cumbria, England. The whole council was up for election with boundary changes since the last election in 2016, these major changes to boundaries were recommended by the Local Government Boundary Commission for England (LGBCE) .

== Election result ==
This result had the following consequences for the total number of seats on the Council after the elections:

Party	Previous council	New council	+/-
Liberal Democrats	32	29	▼3
Conservatives	16	19	▲3
Labour	2	3	▲1
Independent	1	0	▼1
Green	0	0	Steady
UKIP	0	0	Steady
Total	51	51	
Working majority	13	7	

South Lakeland local election result 2018
Party	Seats	Gains	Losses	Net gain/loss	Seats %	Votes %	Votes	+/−
Liberal Democrats	29	0	3	-3	56.86	41.00	43860	
Conservative	19	3	0	+3	37.25	40.92	43777	
Labour	3	1	0	+1	5.88	10.12	10828	
Independent	0	0	1	-1	0	0.27	286	
Green	0	0	0	0	0	7.69	8231	

== Ward results ==
An asterisk * indicates an incumbent seeking re-election.

=== Ambleside and Grasmere ===
Ambleside and Grasmere (2)
Party	Candidate	Votes	%	±%
Liberal Democrats	Vicky Hughes*	863	58.4	
Liberal Democrats	Vivienne Rees*	780	52.8	
Conservative	Martin Hall	399	27.0	
Conservative	Sandra Lilley	375	25.4	
Green	Christina Birch	147	10.0	
Labour	Josh Gilroy	108	7.3	
Labour	Mark Harrison	97	6.6	
Green	Arthur Kincaid	76	5.1	
Majority		381	25.8	
Turnout		1,477	42.7	
Liberal Democrats win (new seat)				
Liberal Democrats win (new seat)				

=== Arnside and Milnthorpe ===
Arnside and Milnthorpe (3)
Party	Candidate	Votes	%	±%
Liberal Democrats	Ian Stewart*	1,513	55.5	
Liberal Democrats	Rupert Audland*	1,449	53.2	
Liberal Democrats	Pete McSweeney*	1,440	52.9	
Conservative	Steven Hurst	930	34.1	
Conservative	Rachel Ashburner	916	33.6	
Conservative	Katy Shuttleworth	677	24.9	
Green	Jill Abel	353	13.0	
Labour	Barry Morgan	140	5.1	
Green	Hilary Pickup	123	4.5	
Green	Mark Poole	100	3.7	
Majority		510	18.8	
Turnout		2,724	52.6	
Liberal Democrats win (new seat)				
Liberal Democrats win (new seat)				
Liberal Democrats win (new seat)				

=== Bowness and Levens ===
Bowness and Levens (3)
Party	Candidate	Votes	%	±%
Conservative	John Holmes*	1,271	57.4	
Conservative	Kevin Holmes	1,204	54.4	
Conservative	David Williams*	1,146	51.8	
Liberal Democrats	Lynda Bond	642	29.0	
Liberal Democrats	William Rooke	585	26.4	
Liberal Democrats	Carl Smith	584	26.4	
Green	Helen Bentley	296	13.4	
Green	Jenny Holden-Wilde	162	7.3	
Labour	Charlie Whinney	152	6.9	
Green	Chris Wilde	136	6.1	
Majority		504	22.8	
Turnout		2,213	47.3	
Conservative win (new seat)				
Conservative win (new seat)				
Conservative win (new seat)				

=== Broughton and Coniston ===
Broughton and Coniston (3)
Party	Candidate	Votes	%	±%
Conservative	Anne Hall*	1,081	43.6	
Liberal Democrats	Tracy Coward	1,029	41.5	
Conservative	Matt Brereton	972	39.2	
Liberal Democrats	David Fletcher*	940	37.9	
Conservative	Anna Ellwood	918	37.0	
Liberal Democrats	Ian Wharton	876	35.4	
Independent	Joss Curwen*	286	11.5	
Green	Lynette Gilligan	234	9.4	
Labour	Geraldine Scott	232	9.4	
Labour	Paul Martin	165	6.7	
Labour	Kevin Parker	165	6.7	
Majority		32	1.3	
Turnout		2,478	48.8	
Conservative win (new seat)				
Liberal Democrats win (new seat)				
Conservative win (new seat)				

=== Burton and Crooklands ===
Burton and Crooklands (3)
Party	Candidate	Votes	%	±%
Conservative	Roger Bingham*	1,534	59.5	
Conservative	Brian Cooper*	1,218	47.2	
Conservative	Tom Harvey*	1,205	46.7	
Liberal Democrats	Sheila Eccles*	984	38.2	
Liberal Democrats	Christine Herbert	898	34.8	
Liberal Democrats	Karl Singleton	881	34.2	
Labour	Paul Casson	174	6.7	
Green	Claire Wickham	154	6.0	
Green	Wendi Lethbridge	145	5.6	
Green	Simon Blunden	134	5.2	
Majority		221	8.5	
Turnout		2,578	53.8	
Conservative win (new seat)				
Conservative win (new seat)				
Conservative win (new seat)				

=== Cartmel ===
Cartmel (2)
Party	Candidate	Votes	%	±%
Liberal Democrats	Gill Gardner*	784	50.2	
Conservative	Michael Cornah	687	44.0	
Liberal Democrats	Dave Rawcliffe	657	42.1	
Conservative	Joanne Moore	611	39.1	
Labour	Kate Random Love	98	6.3	
Green	Robin Le Mare	93	6.0	
Green	Gwen Harrison	44	2.8	
Majority		30	1.9	
Turnout		1,562	48.5	
Liberal Democrats win (new seat)				
Conservative win (new seat)				

=== Furness Peninsula ===
Furness Peninsula (3)
Party	Candidate	Votes	%	±%
Conservative	James Airey*	1,014	49.6	
Conservative	Caroline Airey*	986	48.2	
Conservative	Andrew Butcher*	878	43.0	
Liberal Democrats	Janet Willis	812	39.7	
Liberal Democrats	Lorraine Birchall	673	32.9	
Liberal Democrats	Alan Cook	620	30.3	
Labour	Joan Casson	245	12.0	
Labour	Philip Cooper	209	10.2	
Labour	Eirik Hunt	202	9.9	
Green	Peter Howlett	172	8.4	
Majority		66	3.3	
Turnout		2,044	43.8	
Conservative win (new seat)				
Conservative win (new seat)				
Conservative win (new seat)				

=== Grange ===
Grange (3)
Party	Candidate	Votes	%	±%
Liberal Democrats	Eric Morrell*	1,215	48.6	
Liberal Democrats	Robin Ashcroft	1,139	45.5	
Liberal Democrats	Dave Khan	1,121	44.8	
Conservative	Steve Chambers	1,058	42.3	
Conservative	Nathan Bushell	1,016	40.6	
Conservative	Daniel Asplin	975	39.0	
Green	Rachel Whiteley	272	10.9	
Labour	Nicola Kennedy	189	7.6	
Green	Chris Rowley	115	4.6	
Green	Clive Wickham	75	3.0	
Majority		63	2.5	
Turnout		2,502	54.1	
Liberal Democrats win (new seat)				
Liberal Democrats win (new seat)				
Liberal Democrats win (new seat)				

=== Kendal East ===
Kendal East (3)
Party	Candidate	Votes	%	±%
Liberal Democrats	Rachael Hogg	1,093	48.5	
Liberal Democrats	Eamonn Hennessy	958	42.5	
Liberal Democrats	Helen Ladhams	885	39.3	
Conservative	James Alexander	806	35.8	
Conservative	Lyndsay Slater	719	31.9	
Conservative	Pam Flitcroft	700	31.1	
Labour	Phil Atherton	279	12.4	
Labour	Helen Stafford	228	10.1	
Labour	Maggie Mason	221	9.8	
Green	Janet Antrobus	205	9.1	
Green	Paul Woods	154	6.8	
Green	Andy Mason	146	6.5	
Majority		79	3.5	
Turnout		2,252	44.0	
Liberal Democrats win (new seat)				
Liberal Democrats win (new seat)				
Liberal Democrats win (new seat)				

=== Kendal North ===
Kendal North (2)
Party	Candidate	Votes	%	±%
Liberal Democrats	Stephen Coleman*	667	42.6	
Liberal Democrats	Jon Owen	543	34.7	
Green	Carole Wood	468	29.9	
Conservative	Harry Taylor	372	23.8	
Conservative	Thomas Scott	324	20.7	
Green	Laura Miller	270	17.3	
Labour	Jo Magne	238	15.2	
Labour	Jim Ring	183	11.7	
Majority		75	4.8	
Turnout		1,565	47.4	
Liberal Democrats win (new seat)				
Liberal Democrats win (new seat)				

=== Kendal Rural ===
Kendal Rural (3)
Party	Candidate	Votes	%	±%
Conservative	Pat Bell	1,044	42.9	
Liberal Democrats	Anne Hutton	969	39.8	
Liberal Democrats	Hazel Hodgson	907	37.3	
Conservative	Mike Nicholson	848	34.9	
Liberal Democrats	Cheryl Tearle	830	34.1	
Conservative	Nigel Byrom	818	33.6	
Green	Fran Richardson	338	13.9	
Green	Adrian Porter	280	11.5	
Green	Daniel Rayson	274	11.3	
Labour	Mike Hallsall	181	7.4	
Labour	Hanna Burke	176	7.2	
Majority		59	2.4	
Turnout		2,432	49.5	
Conservative win (new seat)				
Liberal Democrats win (new seat)				
Liberal Democrats win (new seat)				

=== Kendal South and Natland ===
Kendal South and Natland (3)
Party	Candidate	Votes	%	±%
Liberal Democrats	Jonathan Brook*	1,181	48.2	
Liberal Democrats	Chris Hogg*	1,130	46.2	
Liberal Democrats	Doug Rathbone	1,017	41.5	
Conservative	John Waddington	944	38.6	
Conservative	Aron Taylor	906	37.0	
Conservative	Margaret Bond	872	35.6	
Green	Henry Adams	178	7.3	
Labour	Lois Sparling	174	7.1	
Green	Meg Hill	160	6.5	
Labour	Alison Gilchrist	142	5.8	
Green	Elsa Fuster-Mears	120	4.9	
Labour	Ian Law	114	4.7	
Majority		73	2.9	
Turnout		2,448	49.6	
Liberal Democrats win (new seat)				
Liberal Democrats win (new seat)				
Liberal Democrats win (new seat)				

=== Kendal Town ===
Kendal Town (3)
Party	Candidate	Votes	%	±%
Liberal Democrats	Giles Archibald*	1,219	53.6	
Liberal Democrats	Peter Thornton*	1,040	45.7	
Liberal Democrats	Phil Dixon*	1,006	44.2	
Labour	Paul Braithwaite	433	19.0	
Conservative	Fraser Lyall	425	18.7	
Conservative	Claire Shuttleworth	423	18.6	
Conservative	Daniel Egglestone	419	18.4	
Labour	Mick Downes	396	17.4	
Labour	Alison Ireland	365	16.0	
Green	Robin Bailey	301	13.2	
Green	Andrew Herbert	277	12.2	
Green	Ian Rodham	227	10.0	
Majority		573	25.2	
Turnout		2,276	45.7	
Liberal Democrats win (new seat)				
Liberal Democrats win (new seat)				
Liberal Democrats win (new seat)				

=== Kendal West ===
Kendal West (3)
Party	Candidate	Votes	%	±%
Liberal Democrats	Brian Finch*	999	46.8	
Liberal Democrats	Matt Severn*	842	39.4	
Liberal Democrats	Graham Vincent*	841	39.4	
Conservative	Hannah Lane	670	31.4	
Conservative	Melvin Mackie	558	26.1	
Conservative	Bill Wearing	532	24.9	
Labour	Tony Rothwell	355	16.6	
Labour	Trevor Batchelor	326	15.3	
Labour	Kate Tordoff	231	10.8	
Green	Sue Cox	205	9.6	
Green	Rosie Whiting	136	6.4	
Green	Phil Whiting	119	5.6	
Majority		171	8.0	
Turnout		2,135	41.0	
Liberal Democrats win (new seat)				
Liberal Democrats win (new seat)				
Liberal Democrats win (new seat)				

=== Sedbergh and Kirkby Lonsdale ===
Sedbergh and Kirkby Lonsdale (3)
Party	Candidate	Votes	%	±%
Conservative	Kevin Lancaster*	1,298	47.3	
Liberal Democrats	Ian Mitchell	1,213	44.2	
Conservative	Sheila Capstick	1,180	43.0	
Liberal Democrats	Suzie Pye	1,176	42.9	
Liberal Democrats	Christine Best	1,158	42.2	
Conservative	Sheena Pring	1,076	39.2	
Green	Andi Chapple	202	7.4	
Labour	Nick Cross	164	6.0	
Green	Daphne Jackson	141	5.1	
Green	Adam Rubinstein	80	2.9	
Majority		4	0.1	
Turnout		2,742	50.4	
Conservative win (new seat)				
Liberal Democrats win (new seat)				
Conservative win (new seat)				

=== Ulverston East ===
Ulverston East (3)
Party	Candidate	Votes	%	±%
Labour	Mark Wilson*	818	50.7	
Labour	David Webster	806	50.0	
Labour	Shirley-Anne Wilson	747	46.3	
Conservative	Norman Bishop-Rowe*	581	36.0	
Conservative	Sarah Archer	561	34.8	
Conservative	Ben Cooper	514	31.9	
Green	Chris Loynes	272	16.9	
Liberal Democrats	Andrew Hudson	224	13.9	
Majority		166	10.3	
Turnout		1,612	34.3	
Labour win (new seat)				
Labour win (new seat)				
Labour win (new seat)				

=== Ulverston West ===
Ulverston West (3)
Party	Candidate	Votes	%	±%
Conservative	Helen Irving*	1,032	50.0	
Conservative	Janette Jenkinson*	1,028	49.8	
Conservative	Amanda Rigg*	955	46.2	
Labour	Bharath Rajan	640	31.0	
Labour	Sharon Webster	625	30.3	
Labour	Derek Willison-Parry	569	27.5	
Green	Judy Filmore	500	24.2	
Liberal Democrats	Ray Beacham	247	12.0	
Liberal Democrats	Maureen Nicholson	194	9.4	
Majority		315	15.2	
Turnout		2,066	44.6	
Conservative win (new seat)				
Conservative win (new seat)				
Conservative win (new seat)				

=== Windermere ===
Windermere (3)
Party	Candidate	Votes	%	±%
Conservative	Ben Berry*	1,234	51.2	
Liberal Democrats	Andrew Jarvis*	1,067	44.3	
Liberal Democrats	Dyan Jones*	1,035	43.0	
Conservative	Jane Hoyle	975	40.5	
Liberal Democrats	Magda Khan	934	38.8	
Conservative	Ian Keeling	899	37.3	
Labour	Penny Henderson	231	9.6	
Green	Kate Threadgold	181	7.5	
Green	Georgie Brasher	85	3.5	
Green	Eve Morgan	81	3.4	
Majority		60	2.5	
Turnout		2,409	50.7	
Conservative win (new seat)				
Liberal Democrats win (new seat)				
Liberal Democrats win (new seat)				

== By-Elections ==
A by-election was held on 20 December 2018 to fill a vacancy in Arnside & Milnthorpe following the death of Councillor Ian Stewart.

Arnside and Milnthorpe
Party	Candidate	Votes	%	±%
Liberal Democrats	Helen Chaffey	1,319	59.4	+3.9
Conservative	Rachel Ashburner	709	31.9	−1.7
Green	Jill Abel	125	5.6	−7.4
Labour	Kate Love	68	3.1	−2.0
Majority		610	27.5	+6.1
Turnout		2,221	44.2	−8.4
Liberal Democrats hold		Swing		
