= 2006 South Lakeland District Council election =

2006 UK local government election

Results of the 2006 South Lakeland District Council election

The 2006 South Lakeland District Council election took place on 4 May 2006 to elect members of South Lakeland District Council in Cumbria, England. One third of the council was up for election and the Liberal Democrats gained overall control of the council from no overall control.

After the election, the composition of the council was:

- Liberal Democrat 31
- Conservative 18
- Labour 2
- Independent 1

== Background ==
Candidates in the election included a Save Westmorland Hospital Group, opposed to any reduced services at Westmorland General Hospital. Meanwhile, councillors who stood down at the election included cabinet member Bob Barker and long time independent Elizabeth Braithwaite.

== Election result ==
The results saw the Liberal Democrats win a majority on the council after gaining 9 seats, 6 from Labour, 2 from the Conservatives and 1 from an independent. This gave the Liberal Democrats 31 seats and was the first time that a political party had won a majority on the council. The 6 Liberal Democrat gains from Labour were all in Kendal, as well as 1 of the 2 gains from the Conservatives. The other 2 seats they gained were Sedbergh from the Conservatives and Lakes Grasmere, where the independent councillor had stepped down at the election.

South Lakeland local election result 2006
Party	Seats	Gains	Losses	Net gain/loss	Seats %	Votes %	Votes	+/−
Liberal Democrats	17	9	0	+9	94.4	66.4	10,131	+28.8%
Conservative	1	0	2	-2	5.6	22.8	3,475	-24.5%
Labour	0	0	6	-6	0	8.0	1,218	+1.0%
Independent	0	0	1	-1	0	1.6	251	-4.2%
Save Westmorland Hospital Group	0	0	0	0	0	1.0	150	New
Green	0	0	0	0	0	0.2	35	-1.5%

== Ward results ==
Kendal Castle
Party	Candidate	Votes	%	±%
Liberal Democrats	Sonia Lawson*	612	75.2	+23.5
Conservative	Enid Robinson	202	24.8	−15.4
Majority		410	50.4	+38.9
Turnout		814	55.3	+11.3
Liberal Democrats hold		Swing		

Kendal Far Cross
Party	Candidate	Votes	%	±%
Liberal Democrats	Enda Farrell	512	73.6	+39.2
Conservative	Simon Butterfield*	152	21.8	−22.1
Labour	Nicola Wright	32	4.6	−17.0
Majority		360	51.8	
Turnout		696	45.7	+6.9
Liberal Democrats gain from Conservative		Swing		

Kendal Fell
Party	Candidate	Votes	%	±%
Liberal Democrats	Paul Little**	435	62.9	+23.0
Labour	Robin Yates*	179	25.9	−21.7
Conservative	Jack Tomlinson	78	11.3	−1.2
Majority		256	37.0	
Turnout		692	46.8	+11.2
Liberal Democrats gain from Labour		Swing		

- Paul Little was a sitting councillor for the Kendal Highgate ward.

Kendal Glebelands
Party	Candidate	Votes	%	±%
Liberal Democrats	Sylvia Emmott	559	70.7	+34.6
Labour	Robert Rothwell*	138	17.4	−22.4
Conservative	Pamela Flitcroft	94	11.9	−12.2
Majority		421	53.3	
Turnout		791	53.7	+7.3
Liberal Democrats gain from Labour		Swing		

Kendal Heron Hill
Party	Candidate	Votes	%	±%
Liberal Democrats	Stephen Shine*	649	81.2	+17.5
Conservative	Katherine Nicholson	150	18.8	−5.1
Majority		499	62.4	+22.6
Turnout		799	49.1	+10.3
Liberal Democrats hold		Swing		

Kendal Highgate
Party	Candidate	Votes	%	±%
Liberal Democrats	Clive Graham	396	57.6	+14.2
Labour	Marilyn Molloy	217	31.5	−9.9
Conservative	Eric Wright	75	10.9	−4.3
Majority		179	26.1	+24.1
Turnout		688	51.0	+8.8
Liberal Democrats hold		Swing		

Kendal Kirkland
Party	Candidate	Votes	%	±%
Liberal Democrats	Robert Cocker	345	65.5	+49.3
Labour	Avril Dobson*	109	20.7	−43.7
Conservative	Lucia Cartmell	43	8.2	−11.2
Save Westmorland Hospital Group	Andrew Billson-Page	30	5.7	N/A
Majority		236	44.8	
Turnout		527	38.9	+9.9
Liberal Democrats gain from Labour		Swing		

Kendal Mintsfeet
Party	Candidate	Votes	%	±%
Liberal Democrats	Gwendoline Murfin**	479	60.1	+17.5
Independent	Nigel Blamire	189	23.7	N/A
Conservative	Andrew Coates	129	16.2	−9.6
Majority		290	36.4	+25.4
Turnout		797	48.3	+13.0
Liberal Democrats hold		Swing		

- Gwendoline Murfin was a sitting councillor for the Kendal Oxenholme ward.

Kendal Nether
Party	Candidate	Votes	%	±%
Liberal Democrats	Clare Feeney-Johnson	471	65.9	+22.5
Labour	Paul Braithwaite*	182	25.5	−18.9
Conservative	Melvin Mackie	62	8.7	−3.5
Majority		289	40.4	
Turnout		715	50.2	+4.4
Liberal Democrats gain from Labour		Swing		

Kendal Oxenholme
Party	Candidate	Votes	%	±%
Liberal Democrats	Jonathan Brook	626	74.0	+16.5
Conservative	Geoffrey Robson	99	11.7	−12.7
Independent	Nigel Byrom	62	7.3	N/A
Labour	Keith Fawcett	31	3.7	−14.4
Save Westmorland Hospital Group	Anna Billson-Page	28	3.3	N/A
Majority		527	62.3	+29.2
Turnout		846	46.4	+10.2
Liberal Democrats hold		Swing		

Kendal Parks
Party	Candidate	Votes	%	±%
Liberal Democrats	Brendan Jameson*	528	74.9	+1.6
Conservative	Olga Lewis	96	13.6	−5.1
Save Westmorland Hospital Group	Leonard Edgar	46	6.5	N/A
Green	Jonathan Briggs	35	5.0	N/A
Majority		432	61.3	+6.7
Turnout		705	43.0	+10.2
Liberal Democrats hold		Swing		

Kendal Stonecross
Party	Candidate	Votes	%	±%
Liberal Democrats	Graham Vincent*	643	68.6	+9.8
Conservative	Richard Liddle	215	22.9	−10.9
Labour	Jennifer Rothwell	79	8.4	+1.0
Majority		428	45.7	+20.7
Turnout		937	58.8	+6.1
Liberal Democrats hold		Swing		

Kendal Strickland
Party	Candidate	Votes	%	±%
Liberal Democrats	Stephen Coleman	671	74.8	+55.3
Conservative	Helen Graham	116	12.9	−6.6
Labour	Mark Kidd	110	12.3	−48.7
Majority		555	61.9	
Turnout		897	52.9	+16.0
Liberal Democrats gain from Labour		Swing		

Kendal Underley
Party	Candidate	Votes	%	±%
Liberal Democrats	Robert Curry	488	66.5	+46.1
Labour	Martyn Jowett	141	19.2	−44.6
Conservative	David Williams	59	8.0	−7.8
Save Westmorland Hospital Group	Charles Batteson*	46	6.3	−57.5
Majority		357	47.3	
Turnout		734	49.1	+5.7
Liberal Democrats gain from Labour		Swing		

- Charles Batteson was originally elected as a Labour councillor.

Kirkby Lonsdale (by-election)
Party	Candidate	Votes	%	±%
Conservative	Rodger Read	531	57.8	−3.4
Liberal Democrats	Jennifer Foot	388	42.2	+36.3
Majority		143	15.6	−12.7
Turnout		919	48.8	−5.4
Conservative hold		Swing		

Lakes Ambleside
Party	Candidate	Votes	%	±%
Liberal Democrats	David Earnshaw	1,018	69.3	+24.5
Conservative	John Curwen	452	30.7	−17.1
Majority		566	38.6	+30.6
Turnout		1,470	51.4	+12.8
Liberal Democrats hold		Swing		

Lakes Grasmere
Party	Candidate	Votes	%	±%
Liberal Democrats	Vivienne Rees	433	70.5	N/A
Conservative	Thomas Holden	181	29.5	N/A
Majority		252	41.0	
Turnout		614	53.5	N/A
Liberal Democrats gain from Independent		Swing		

Sedbergh
Party	Candidate	Votes	%	±%
Liberal Democrats	Craig Stephenson	878	54.2	+26.7
Conservative	David Wilson	741	45.8	−26.7
Majority		137	8.4	
Turnout		1,619	57.8	+20.4
Liberal Democrats gain from Conservative		Swing		
