= South Lakeland =

Former local government district in England

Coordinates: 54.312°N 2.880°W

South Lakeland District
- Non-metropolitan district

- Shown within Cumbria
- Sovereign state: United Kingdom
- Constituent country: England
- Region: North West England
- Ceremonial county: Cumbria
- Historic county: Lancashire (part); Westmorland (part); Yorkshire (part)
- Founded: 1 April 1974
- Abolished: 31 March 2023
- Admin. HQ: Kendal

Government
  - Type: South Lakeland District Council

Area
  - Total: 593 sq mi (1,535 km^{2})

Population (2021)
  - Total: 104,676
  - Density: 176.6/sq mi (68.19/km^{2})
- Time zone: UTC+0 (Greenwich Mean Time)
  - Summer (DST): UTC+1 (British Summer Time)
- ONS code: 16UG (ONS); E07000031 (GSS)
- Website: southlakeland.gov.uk

South Lakeland was a local government district in Cumbria, England, from 1974 to 2023. Its council was based in Kendal. The district covered the southern part of the Lake District region, as well as northwestern parts of the Yorkshire Dales. At the 2011 Census, the population of the district was 103,658, an increase from 102,301 at the 2001 Census.

The district was created on 1 April 1974 under the Local Government Act 1972. It was formed from the Kendal borough, Windermere urban district, most of Lakes urban district, South Westmorland Rural District, from Westmorland, Grange and Ulverston urban districts and North Lonsdale Rural District from Lancashire, and Sedbergh Rural District from the West Riding of Yorkshire.

In April 2023, Cumbria was reorganised into two unitary authorities. South Lakeland District Council was abolished and its functions were transferred to the Westmorland and Furness unitary authority.

== Governance ==
Elections to the district council were held in three out of every four years, with one third of the 51 seats on the council being elected at each election. No political party held a majority on the council from the first election in 1973 to 2006. However, after winning a majority at the 2006 election the Liberal Democrats controlled the council. After a set of by-elections in 2021 the council was composed of the following councillors:-

Party	Councillors
Liberal Democrats	33
Conservative Party	14
Labour Party	3
Green	1

The council was fined £120,000 in February 2015 after two women were killed in separate incidents by reversing rubbish lorries. An investigation by the Health and Safety Executive found they had failed to tackle the risks from reversing vehicles.

== Map ==
The larger and better-known settlements of South Lakeland
