= 2002 United Kingdom local elections =

- 2 May 2002

All 32 London boroughs, all 36 metropolitan boroughs, 18 unitary authorities, 88 English districts and 7 directly elected mayors
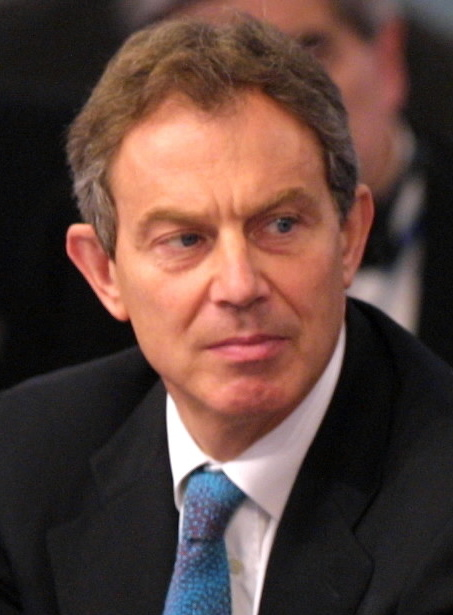

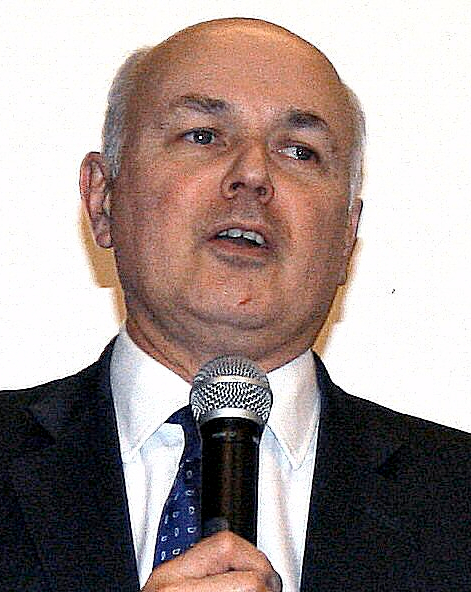

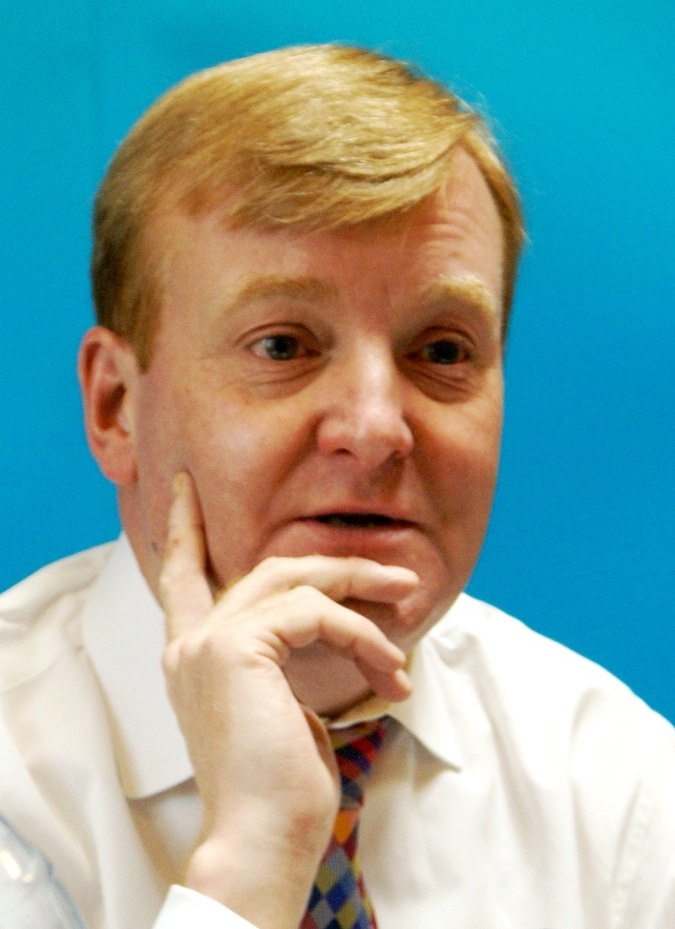
	Majority party	Minority party	Third party
Leader	Tony Blair	Iain Duncan Smith	Charles Kennedy
Party	Labour	Conservative	Liberal Democrats
Leader since	21 July 1994	13 September 2001	9 August 1999
Percentage	33% (Note: All vote shares in the infobox are projected national vote shares, not total votes cast.)	34%	27%
Swing	▲2%	▼6%	▲2%
Councils	64	42	15
Councils +/-	▼7	▲9	▲2
Councillors	2,416	2,007	1,250
Councillors +/-	▼334	▲238	▲37
- Colours denote council control following elections, as shown in the main table of results.

The 2002 United Kingdom local elections were held on Thursday 2 May 2002. All London borough council seats were elected as well a third of the seats on each of the metropolitan boroughs. Many unitary authorities and district councils also had elections. There were no local elections in Scotland, Wales or Northern Ireland. This was the last time that Labour had the largest number of councillors in local government until 2023.

== Results ==
Simon Parker of The Guardian described the elections as "a round of embarrassing [sic] defeats for Labour in a set of council elections that also saw opposition parties making minor inroads into the party's dominant position in local government. [...] But the night really belonged to independents and the smaller parties, who made some high-profile gains as the voters expressed their dissatisfaction with mainstream politics."

== England ==
=== London boroughs ===
In all 32 London boroughs, the whole council was up for election.

Council	Previous control	Result	Details
Barking and Dagenham ‡	Labour	Labour hold	Details
Barnet ‡	No overall control	Conservative gain	Details
Bexley ‡	No overall control	Labour gain	Details
Brent ‡	Labour	Labour hold	Details
Bromley ‡	Conservative	Conservative hold	Details
Camden ‡	Labour	Labour hold	Details
Croydon ‡	Labour	Labour hold	Details
Ealing ‡	Labour	Labour hold	Details
Enfield ‡	Labour	Conservative gain	Details
Greenwich ‡	Labour	Labour hold	Details
Hackney ‡	Labour	Labour hold	Details
Hammersmith and Fulham ‡	Labour	Labour hold	Details
Haringey ‡	Labour	Labour hold	Details
Harrow ‡	Labour	No overall control gain	Details
Havering ‡	No overall control	No overall control hold	Details
Hillingdon ‡	No overall control	No overall control hold	Details
Hounslow ‡	Labour	Labour hold	Details
Islington ‡	Liberal Democrats	Liberal Democrats hold	Details
Kensington and Chelsea ‡	Conservative	Conservative hold	Details
Kingston upon Thames ‡	No overall control	Liberal Democrats gain	Details
Lambeth ‡	Labour	No overall control gain	Details
Lewisham ‡	Labour	Labour hold	Details
Merton ‡	Labour	Labour hold	Details
Newham ‡	Labour	Labour hold	Details
Redbridge ‡	No overall control	Conservative gain	Details
Richmond upon Thames ‡	Liberal Democrats	Conservative gain	Details
Southwark ‡	No overall control	No overall control hold	Details
Sutton ‡	Liberal Democrats	Liberal Democrats hold	Details
Tower Hamlets ‡	Labour	Labour hold	Details
Waltham Forest ‡	Labour	No overall control gain	Details
Wandsworth ‡	Conservative	Conservative hold	Details
Westminster ‡	Conservative	Conservative hold	Details

‡ New ward boundaries

=== Metropolitan boroughs ===
All 36 English Metropolitan borough councils had one third of their seats up for election.

Council	Previous control	Result	Details
Barnsley	Labour	Labour hold	Details
Birmingham	Labour	Labour hold	Details
Bolton	Labour	Labour hold	Details
Bradford	No overall control	No overall control hold	Details
Bury	Labour	Labour hold	Details
Calderdale	Conservative	No overall control gain (Conservative Minority)	Details
Coventry	Labour	Labour hold	Details
Doncaster	Labour	Labour hold	Details
Dudley	Labour	Labour hold	Details
Gateshead	Labour	Labour hold	Details
Kirklees	No overall control	No overall control hold	Details
Knowsley	Labour	Labour hold	Details
Leeds	Labour	Labour hold	Details
Liverpool	Liberal Democrats	Liberal Democrats hold	Details
Manchester	Labour	Labour hold	Details
Newcastle upon Tyne	Labour	Labour hold	Details
North Tyneside	Labour	Labour hold	Details
Oldham	Liberal Democrats	No overall control gain	Details
Rochdale	Labour	Labour hold	Details
Rotherham	Labour	Labour hold	Details
Salford	Labour	Labour hold	Details
Sandwell	Labour	Labour hold	Details
Sefton	No overall control	No overall control hold	Details
Sheffield	Liberal Democrats	No overall control gain	Details
Solihull	Conservative	Conservative hold	Details
South Tyneside	Labour	Labour hold	Details
St Helens	Labour	Labour hold	Details
Stockport	Liberal Democrats	Liberal Democrats hold	Details
Sunderland	Labour	Labour hold	Details
Tameside	Labour	Labour hold	Details
Trafford	Labour	Labour hold	Details
Wakefield	Labour	Labour hold	Details
Walsall	No overall control	No overall control hold	Details
Wigan	Labour	Labour hold	Details
Wirral	No overall control	No overall control hold	Details
Wolverhampton	Labour	Labour hold	Details

=== Unitary authorities ===
==== Whole council ====
In six English Unitary authorities, the whole council was up for election.

Council	Previous control	Result	Details
Derby ‡	Labour	Labour hold	Details
Kingston upon Hull ‡	Labour	No overall control gain	Details
Milton Keynes ‡	No overall control	Liberal Democrats gain	Details
Portsmouth ‡	No overall control	No overall control hold	Details
Southampton ‡	No overall control	No overall control hold	Details
Stoke-on-Trent ‡	Labour	No overall control gain	Details

‡ New ward boundaries

==== Third of council ====
In 12 English Unitary authorities, one third of the council was up for election.

Council	Previous control	Result	Details
Blackburn with Darwen	Labour	Labour hold	Details
Bristol	Labour	Labour hold	Details
Halton	Labour	Labour hold	Details
Hartlepool	No overall control	No overall control hold	Details
Peterborough	No overall control	Conservative gain	Details
Reading	Labour	Labour hold	Details
Slough	Labour	Labour hold	Details
Southend-on-Sea	Conservative	Conservative hold	Details
Swindon	No overall control	No overall control hold	Details
Thurrock	Labour	Labour hold	Details
Warrington	Labour	Labour hold	Details
Wokingham	No overall control	Conservative gain	Details

=== District councils ===
==== Whole council ====
In 46 English district authorities, the whole council was up for election.

Council	Previous control	Result	Details
Basildon ‡	No overall control	No overall control hold	Details
Basingstoke and Deane ‡	No overall control	No overall control hold	Details
Bassetlaw ‡	Labour	Labour hold	Details
Bedford ‡	No overall control	No overall control hold	Details
Brentwood ‡	Liberal Democrats	Liberal Democrats hold	Details
Burnley ‡	Labour	Labour hold	Details
Cannock Chase ‡	Labour	Labour hold	Details
Cheltenham ‡	Conservative	Liberal Democrats gain	Details
Cherwell ‡	Conservative	Conservative hold	Details
Chorley ‡	No overall control	No overall control hold	Details
Colchester ‡	No overall control	No overall control hold	Details
Craven ‡	No overall control	No overall control hold	Details
Eastbourne ‡	Conservative	Liberal Democrats gain	Details
Eastleigh ‡	Liberal Democrats	Liberal Democrats hold	Details
Epping Forest ‡	No overall control	No overall control hold	Details
Fareham ‡	Conservative	Conservative hold	Details
Gloucester ‡	No overall control	No overall control hold	Details
Gosport ‡	No overall control	No overall control hold	Details
Harlow ‡	Labour	No overall control gain	Details
Harrogate ‡	Liberal Democrats	No overall control gain	Details
Hart ‡	No overall control	Conservative gain	Details
Hastings ‡	Labour	Labour hold	Details
Havant ‡	No overall control	Conservative gain	Details
Hyndburn ‡	Conservative	Labour gain	Details
Ipswich ‡	Labour	Labour hold	Details
Maidstone ‡	No overall control	No overall control hold	Details
Newcastle-under-Lyme ‡	Labour	No overall control gain	Details
Nuneaton and Bedworth ‡	Labour	Labour hold	Details
Oxford ‡	No overall control	Labour gain	Details
Pendle ‡	No overall control	No overall control hold	Details
Preston ‡	No overall control	No overall control hold	Details
Rochford ‡	No overall control	Conservative gain	Details
Rossendale ‡	Conservative	Labour gain	Details
Rugby ‡	No overall control	No overall control hold	Details
Rushmoor ‡	Conservative	Conservative hold	Details
Shrewsbury and Atcham ‡	No overall control	Conservative gain	Details
South Bedfordshire ‡	Conservative	Conservative hold	Details
Stratford-on-Avon ‡	Conservative	Conservative hold	Details
Stroud ‡	No overall control	Conservative gain	Details
Swale ‡	No overall control	Conservative gain	Details
Tamworth ‡	Labour	Labour hold	Details
Tunbridge Wells ‡	Conservative	Conservative hold	Details
Waveney ‡	Labour	No overall control gain	Details
West Lancashire ‡	No overall control	Conservative gain	Details
West Oxfordshire ‡	Conservative	Conservative hold	Details
Winchester ‡	Liberal Democrats	Liberal Democrats hold	Details

‡ New ward boundaries

==== Third of council ====
In 42 English district authorities, one third of the council was up for election.

Council	Previous control	Result	Details
Adur	No overall control	Conservative gain	Details
Amber Valley	Conservative	Conservative hold	Details
Barrow-in-Furness	No overall control	No overall control hold	Details
Broadland	Conservative	Conservative hold	Details
Broxbourne	Conservative	Conservative hold	Details
Cambridge	Liberal Democrats	Liberal Democrats hold	Details
Carlisle	Conservative	Conservative hold	Details
Chester	No overall control	No overall control hold	Details
Congleton	No overall control	No overall control hold	Details
Crawley	Labour	Labour hold	Details
Crewe and Nantwich	No overall control	No overall control hold	Details
Daventry	Conservative	Conservative hold	Details
Ellesmere Port and Neston	Labour	Labour hold	Details
Elmbridge	No overall control	Residents gain	Details
Exeter	Labour	Labour hold	Details
Great Yarmouth	Conservative	Conservative hold	Details
Hertsmere	Conservative	Conservative hold	Details
Huntingdonshire	Conservative	Conservative hold	Details
Lincoln	Labour	Labour hold	Details
Macclesfield	Conservative	Conservative hold	Details
Mole Valley	No overall control	No overall control hold	Details
North Hertfordshire	Conservative	Conservative hold	Details
Norwich	Labour	Liberal Democrats gain	Details
Penwith	No overall control	No overall control hold	Details
Purbeck	Conservative	Conservative hold	Details
Redditch	Labour	No overall control gain	Details
Reigate and Banstead	Conservative	Conservative hold	Details
Runnymede	Conservative	Conservative hold	Details
South Cambridgeshire	No overall control	No overall control hold	Details
South Lakeland	No overall control	No overall control hold	Details
St Albans	No overall control	No overall control hold	Details
Stevenage	Labour	Labour hold	Details
Tandridge	Conservative	Conservative hold	Details
Three Rivers	Liberal Democrats	Liberal Democrats hold	Details
Watford	No overall control	No overall control hold	Details
Welwyn Hatfield	Labour	Conservative gain	Details
West Lindsey	No overall control	No overall control hold	Details
Weymouth and Portland	No overall control	No overall control hold	Details
Woking	No overall control	No overall control hold	Details
Worcester	No overall control	No overall control hold	Details
Worthing	Conservative	Liberal Democrats gain	Details
Wyre Forest	No overall control	Health Concern gain	Details

=== Mayoral elections ===
There were seven elections for directly elected mayors.

Local Authority	Previous Mayor	Mayor-elect	Details
Doncaster	New Post	Martin Winter (Labour)	
Hartlepool	New Post	Stuart Drummond (Independent)	Details
Lewisham	New Post	Steve Bullock (Labour)	
Middlesbrough	New Post	Ray Mallon (Independent)	
Newham	New Post	Robin Wales (Labour)	
North Tyneside	New Post	Chris Morgan (Conservative)	
Watford	New Post	Dorothy Thornhill (Liberal Democrat)	Details
