= 2002 Milton Keynes Council election =

2002 UK local government election

The 2002 Milton Keynes Council election took place on 2 May 2002 to elect members of Milton Keynes Unitary Council in Buckinghamshire, England. The whole council was up for election with boundary changes since the last election in 2000. The Liberal Democrats gained overall control of the council from no overall control.

== Background ==
Before the election Labour had 22 seats, compared to 20 for the Liberal Democrats and 8 for the Conservatives. However the council was a top target for the Liberal Democrats in the 2002 local elections.

== Election result ==
Milton Keynes local election result 2002
Party	Seats	Gains	Losses	Net gain/loss	Seats %	Votes %	Votes	+/−
Liberal Democrats	27			+7	52.9	36.9	42,042	+2.4%
Labour	16			-6	31.4	31.8	36,258	+0.2%
Conservative	8			0	15.7	28.3	32,220	-2.4%
Green	0			0	0	1.4	1,604	0.0%
Independent	0			-1	0	1.0	1,154	-0.9%
UKIP	0			0	0	0.6	647	+0.6%

== Ward results ==
Bletchley and Fenny Stratford (3)
Party	Candidate	Votes	%	±%
Labour	Grant Gillingham	1,626		
Labour	Elizabeth Campbell	1,597		
Labour	Antony Mabbott	1,524		
Conservative	Douglas Bull	1,323		
Conservative	Dennis Simpson	1,249		
Conservative	Roger Jacobs	1,194		
Liberal Democrats	Vanessa McPake	550		
Liberal Democrats	Phyllis Grantham	539		
Liberal Democrats	Ian Victory	529		
UKIP	Frederick Goldsmith	138		
Turnout		10,269	40.3	

Bradwell (3)
Party	Candidate	Votes	%	±%
Liberal Democrats	Sandra Clark	1,530		
Liberal Democrats	Philip Gerrella	1,480		
Liberal Democrats	Robert Exon	1,433		
Labour	Carol Wood	1,156		
Labour	Claudine Elliott	1,119		
Labour	Brian Gibbs	1,106		
Conservative	Peter Davies	342		
Conservative	Joseph Geary	325		
Conservative	Stewart Tate	317		
Green	Manfred Ambrosius	206		
UKIP	Alexander Mackenzie-Hay	96		
Turnout		9,110	34.8	

Campbell Park (3)
Party	Candidate	Votes	%	±%
Liberal Democrats	Isobel Wilson	1,328		
Liberal Democrats	Isobella Fraser	1,269		
Liberal Democrats	Roger Tallack	1,255		
Labour	Brian Barton	649		
Labour	Martin Petchey	600		
Labour	Stephen Phillips	489		
Conservative	William Clark	295		
Conservative	Nicholas Flaherty	275		
Conservative	Malcolm Fryer-Kelsey	249		
Green	Katrina Topping	159		
Independent	Neil Cawley	144		
UKIP	Michael Maylam	114		
Turnout		6,826	24.4	

Danesborough
Party	Candidate	Votes	%	±%
Conservative	David Hopkins	1,039	75.1	
Labour	Brenda Jarvis	127	9.2	
Liberal Democrats	Robert Evans	114	8.2	
Green	George Richardson	66	4.8	
UKIP	Arnold Leeming	38	2.7	
Majority		912	65.9	
Turnout		1,384	42.8	

Denbigh (2)
Party	Candidate	Votes	%	±%
Labour	Roger Bristow	778		
Labour	Michael Legg	738		
Conservative	John Bailey	493		
Conservative	Daniel Hippey	456		
Independent	William Harnett	194		
Liberal Democrats	Raymond Cockram	160		
Liberal Democrats	Jonathan Scudamore	156		
Turnout		2,975	27.8	

Eaton Manor (2)
Party	Candidate	Votes	%	±%
Labour	Reginald Edwards	961		
Labour	Janet Lloyd	878		
Conservative	James Collins	362		
Conservative	Alexander Swanson	278		
Liberal Democrats	David Henchy	244		
Liberal Democrats	Alice Tootill	171		
Turnout		2,894	27.4	

Emerson Valley (3)
Party	Candidate	Votes	%	±%
Liberal Democrats	Stuart Burke	1,351		
Liberal Democrats	Martin Snell	1,300		
Liberal Democrats	Rosemary Drewett	1,274		
Labour	Gladstone McKenzie	408		
Labour	Colin Lund	405		
Conservative	Geoffrey Ealden	398		
Conservative	Dennis Thatcher	373		
Labour	Elaine Wales	372		
Conservative	Annette Irwin	371		
Turnout		6,252	27.7	

Furzton (2)
Party	Candidate	Votes	%	±%
Liberal Democrats	Jayne Carrington	1,128		
Liberal Democrats	Christopher Williams	1,051		
Conservative	David Bint	542		
Conservative	Kevin Seager	518		
Labour	Samuel McCloskey	506		
Labour	Peter Turner	446		
Turnout		4,191	37.0	

Hanslope Park
Party	Candidate	Votes	%	±%
Conservative	Andrew Geary	866	49.6	
Independent	Bert Tapp	597	34.2	
Labour	Brenda Gibbs	159	9.1	
Liberal Democrats	Jeffrey King	125	7.2	
Majority		259	15.4	
Turnout		1,747	54.2	

Linford North (2)
Party	Candidate	Votes	%	±%
Liberal Democrats	Robert Benning	1,127		
Liberal Democrats	Alan Pugh	1,085		
Conservative	Stephen Conlan	566		
Conservative	David Tunney	551		
Labour	Ernest Billups	498		
Labour	Gary Grindrod	408		
Green	Peter Edwards	140		
Turnout		4,375	34.6	

Linford South (2)
Party	Candidate	Votes	%	±%
Liberal Democrats	John Monk	954		
Liberal Democrats	Christopher Eaton	934		
Labour	John McLinton	401		
Labour	Mohammed Nawaz	329		
Conservative	Catriona Morris	287		
Conservative	Adrienne Lucas	285		
Green	Clive Bailey	117		
UKIP	Christopher Shaw	51		
Turnout		3,358	29.4	

Loughton Park (3)
Party	Candidate	Votes	%	±%
Conservative	Andrew Dransfield	1,226		
Conservative	Donald Hoyle	1,152		
Conservative	Ruth Jury	1,115		
Labour	Jonathan Billsberry	934		
Labour	Irving Nicol	882		
Labour	Michael O'Sullivan	854		
Liberal Democrats	Eric Cooper	534		
Liberal Democrats	John Napper	415		
Liberal Democrats	Jill White	412		
Green	Sheena Hirst-Styles	255		
Independent	Dennis Edwards	219		
Turnout		7,998	33.4	

Middleton (2)
Party	Candidate	Votes	%	±%
Liberal Democrats	Samuel Crooks	857		
Liberal Democrats	Derek Eastman	812		
Conservative	David Briscombe	340		
Conservative	Paul White	315		
Labour	Alan Roberts	216		
Labour	Gary Williams	195		
Green	Clare Butler	76		
Turnout		2,811	32.5	

Newport Pagnell North (2)
Party	Candidate	Votes	%	±%
Liberal Democrats	Euan Henderson	1,327		
Liberal Democrats	Bruce Hardwick	1,260		
Conservative	Michael Horton	361		
Conservative	Dean Miah	271		
Labour	Hugh Burrell	207		
Labour	Susan Platt	190		
Turnout		3,616	33.4	

Newport Pagnell South (2)
Party	Candidate	Votes	%	±%
Liberal Democrats	Irene Henderson	1,356		
Liberal Democrats	Douglas McCall	1,215		
Conservative	Louise Cooper	293		
Conservative	Cherilyn Williams	244		
Labour	William Bethune	203		
Labour	Ilhan Unsal	179		
Turnout		3,490	32.5	

Olney (2)
Party	Candidate	Votes	%	±%
Liberal Democrats	Graham Mabbutt	1,519		
Liberal Democrats	Stephen Clark	1,431		
Conservative	Peggy Butler	928		
Conservative	Gordon Williams	767		
Labour	Deirdre Bethune	290		
Labour	David Jones	219		
UKIP	Michael Phillips	121		
Turnout		5,275	42.8	

Sherington
Party	Candidate	Votes	%	±%
Liberal Democrats	Patricia Seymour	992	58.1	
Conservative	Peter Geary	611	35.8	
Labour	Peter Hevey	105	6.1	
Majority		381	22.3	
Turnout		1,708	52.9	

Stantonbury (2)
Party	Candidate	Votes	%	±%
Labour	Brian Morsley	845		
Labour	Michael Pendry	827		
Conservative	Roy Miller	671		
Conservative	Richard Abery	648		
Liberal Democrats	Derek Newcombe	434		
Liberal Democrats	Alan Tootill	299		
Green	Carol Barac	191		
Turnout		3,915	31.0	

Stony Stratford (3)
Party	Candidate	Votes	%	±%
Conservative	Paul Bartlett	1,610		
Conservative	Amanda Box	1,503		
Conservative	Brinley Carstens	1,425		
Labour	Michael Moutrie	1,255		
Labour	David Lewis	1,215		
Labour	Jessica Holroyd	1,209		
Liberal Democrats	Terence McGowan	621		
Liberal Democrats	Kenneth Moore	502		
Liberal Democrats	Adrian Dnes	430		
Turnout		9,770	38.1	

Walton Park (3)
Party	Candidate	Votes	%	±%
Liberal Democrats	Patricia Wicker	1,281		
Liberal Democrats	Jaime Tamagnini-Barbosa	1,239		
Liberal Democrats	Clive Carruthers	1,229		
Conservative	Laura Davies	647		
Conservative	David Rumens	602		
Conservative	Andrew Sharples	602		
Labour	Sarah Gilmour-Sorensen	463		
Labour	George Byfield	403		
Labour	Donna Coventry	402		
UKIP	Donald Whiteley	89		
Turnout		6,957	24.8	

Whaddon (2)
Party	Candidate	Votes	%	±%
Labour	Nigel Long	1,003		
Labour	Gerrard Adderley	903		
Conservative	Donald McLeod	877		
Conservative	James Langley	813		
Liberal Democrats	Janice Cockram	376		
Liberal Democrats	Jeffrey Punter	297		
Turnout		4,269	34.1	

Wolverton (3)
Party	Candidate	Votes	%	±%
Labour	Norman Miles	1,384		
Labour	Hilary Saunders	1,366		
Labour	Janet Irons	1,365		
Conservative	Geoffrey Cavender	629		
Conservative	John Reeves	505		
Conservative	Kenton White	476		
Liberal Democrats	Peter Rackliff	404		
Green	Alan Francis	394		
Liberal Democrats	Judy Mwanza	363		
Liberal Democrats	John Whistlecraft	305		
Turnout		7,191	26.7	

Woughton (2)
Party	Candidate	Votes	%	±%
Labour	Kevin Wilson	936		
Labour	Stephen Coventry	928		
Conservative	William Kenyon	326		
Conservative	Christopher Nixon-Cacney	309		
Liberal Democrats	Kenneth Otter	299		
Liberal Democrats	Edis Bevan	296		
Turnout		3,094	24.3	
