= 2002 Colchester Borough Council election =

2002 UK local government election

- 2 May 2002

All 60 seats to Colchester Borough Council 31 seats needed for a majority
- Turnout: 30.9% (▲1.2%)
	First party	Second party
Party	Liberal Democrats	Conservative
Last election	23 seats, 33.1%	21 seats, 38.8%
Seats won	26	24
Seat change	▲3	▲3
Popular vote	29,899	32,459
Percentage	36.4%	39.5%
Swing	▲3.3%	▲0.7%
	Third party	Fourth party
Party	Labour	Independent
Last election	15 seats, 24.1%	0 seats, 1.6%
Seats won	6	4
Seat change	▼9	▲4
Popular vote	15,669	3,078
Percentage	19.1%	3.7%
Swing	▼5.0%	▲2.1%
Council control before election
No overall control
Council control after election
No overall control

The 2002 Colchester Borough Council election took place on 2 May 2002 to elect members of Colchester Borough Council in Essex, England. This was the same day as the other local elections across the United Kingdom. The whole council was up for election on new ward boundaries.

The Liberal Democrats and Conservatives both gained seats at the election and secured their positions as the leading parties in Colchester. Following poor performances in recent borough elections, Labour continued to decline and lost the majority of their seats. They finished with only 6 seats on the council, a record low, and remained far back in third place in the popular vote. Independents also made gains. The council stayed under no overall control.

== Summary ==
Both the Liberal Democrats and Conservatives gained seats to move to 26 and 24 seats respectively. This was at the expense of the Labour Party who lost 9 seats to only have 6 councillors.

In total there were 24 new councillors elected, with a number of sitting councillors being defeated, including the leader of the Liberal Democrats on the council, Bill Frame. Frame had previously represented St Mary's ward, but contested Shrub End at the election and failed to be elected. Colin Sykes returned as the leader of the Liberal Democrat group after winning election, 2 years after having lost his seat on the council.

=== Election result ===
2002 Colchester Borough Council election
Party	Candidates	Seats	Gains	Losses	Net gain/loss	Seats %	Votes %	Votes	+/−
Liberal Democrats	46	26	N/A	N/A	▲3	43.3	36.4	29,902	+3.3
Conservative	60	24	N/A	N/A	▲3	40.0	39.5	32,459	+0.7
Labour	39	6	N/A	N/A	▼9	10.0	19.1	15,669	–5.0
Independent	6	4	N/A	N/A	▲4	6.7	3.7	3,078	+2.1
Green	5	0	N/A	N/A	Steady	0.0	1.2	970	N/A
Socialist Alliance	1	0	N/A	N/A	Steady	0.0	0.0	106	N/A
Residents	0	0	N/A	N/A	▼1	0.0	N/A	N/A	–2.4

== Ward results ==
Shown below are ward results according to the council's election results archive.

=== Berechurch ===
Berechurch (3 seats)
Party	Candidate	Votes	%
Liberal Democrats	Terence Sutton*	913	49.9
Liberal Democrats	Craig Sutton	900	49.2
Liberal Democrats	Susan Brooks	875	47.8
Labour	Dave Harris	661	36.1
Labour	Paul Bishop	613	33.5
Labour	Christopher Pearson	592	32.3
Conservative	Elizabeth Lee	249	13.6
Conservative	Peter Burgoyne	239	13.1
Conservative	Patricia Conville	234	12.8
Turnout		1,830	31.0
Registered electors		5,877	
Liberal Democrats hold			
Liberal Democrats hold			
Liberal Democrats gain from Labour			

=== Birch and Winstree ===
Birch and Winstree
Party	Candidate	Votes	%
Conservative	Kevin Bentley	1,117	69.6
Conservative	Peter Crowe*	1,046	65.2
Liberal Democrats	Sharon Coveney	364	22.7
Labour	Derek Jones	311	19.4
Turnout		1,605	39.0
Registered electors		4,107	
Conservative win (new seat)			
Conservative win (new seat)			

=== Castle ===
Castle
Party	Candidate	Votes	%
Liberal Democrats	Christopher Hall*	1,068	58.7
Liberal Democrats	Henry Spyvee*	1,044	57.4
Liberal Democrats	Kenneth Jones*	984	54.1
Conservative	Lynne Dingemans	369	20.3
Conservative	Alison Baxter	357	19.6
Conservative	Andrew Baxter	357	19.6
Labour	Lisa Laybourne	268	14.7
Labour	Hugh Thomas	254	14.0
Labour	Julia Thomas	253	13.9
Green	Peter Lynn	190	10.4
Green	Andrew Senter	128	7.0
Turnout		1,820	32.0
Registered electors		5,675	
Liberal Democrats hold			
Liberal Democrats hold			
Liberal Democrats hold			

=== Christ Church ===
Christ Church
Party	Candidate	Votes	%
Liberal Democrats	Nicholas Cope*	559	46.9
Conservative	Roger Buston*	545	42.6
Liberal Democrats	Martin Hunt	530	41.5
Conservative	Anthony Hauton	488	38.2
Labour	Maureen Lee	231	18.1
Turnout		1,278	40.0
Registered electors		3,191	
Liberal Democrats win (new seat)			
Conservative win (new seat)			

=== Copford & West Stanway ===
Copford & West Stanway
Party	Candidate	Votes	%
Conservative	Elizabeth Blundell*	384	75.2
Liberal Democrats	Sally Scott	125	24.5
Majority		259	50.7
Turnout		511	35.0
Registered electors		1,472	
Conservative win (new seat)			

=== Dedham & Langham ===
Dedham & Langham
Party	Candidate	Votes	%
Conservative	John Garnett*	757	73.7
Liberal Democrats	Carolyn West	197	19.2
Labour	Geraldine Harris	73	7.1
Majority		560	54.5
Turnout		1,029	45.0
Registered electors		2,305	
Conservative win (new seat)			

=== East Donyland ===
East Donyland
Party	Candidate	Votes	%	±%
Labour	Andrew Raison	286	43.2	+9.7
Conservative	Patricia Sanderson*	246	37.2	−6.2
Liberal Democrats	Barry Woodward	130	19.6	−3.5
Majority		40	6.0	N/A
Turnout		662	36.0	−6.0
Registered electors		1,860		
Labour gain from Conservative		Swing	▲8.0	

=== Fordham & Stour ===
Fordham & Stour
Party	Candidate	Votes	%
Conservative	Christopher Arnold*	960	71.7
Conservative	Nigel Chapman*	917	68.5
Liberal Democrats	Alexander Scott	341	25.5
Labour	Thomas Prosser	248	18.5
Turnout		1,338	33.0
Registered electors		4,002	
Conservative win (new seat)			
Conservative win (new seat)			

=== Great Tey ===
Great Tey
Party	Candidate	Votes	%	±%
Conservative	Peter Chillingworth	566	65.7	+20.0
Liberal Democrats	Andrew Phillips*	295	34.3	−11.5
Majority		271	31.5	N/A
Turnout		862	40.0	−4.7
Registered electors		2,172		
Conservative gain from Liberal Democrats		Swing	▲15.8	

No Labour candidate as previous (8.5%).

=== Harbour ===
Harbour
Party	Candidate	Votes	%
Liberal Democrats	Patricia Blandon*	674	52.4
Liberal Democrats	Justin Knight	548	42.6
Labour	David Canning*	424	33.0
Labour	Jane Green	392	30.5
Conservative	Michael Coyne	184	14.3
Conservative	Sandra Rae	165	12.8
Turnout		1,286	29.0
Registered electors		4,376	
Liberal Democrats hold			
Liberal Democrats gain from Labour			

=== Highwoods ===
Highwoods
Party	Candidate	Votes	%
Liberal Democrats	Gerard Oxford*	665	58.6
Liberal Democrats	Beverley Oxford*	649	57.2
Liberal Democrats	Ian Ringer	560	49.3
Conservative	Sarah McClean	294	25.9
Conservative	Alan Blundell	293	25.8
Conservative	Richard Stevenson	278	24.5
Labour	Edmund Chinnery	228	20.1
Labour	Michael Smith	208	18.3
Turnout		1,135	20.0
Registered electors		5,592	
Liberal Democrats win (new seat)			
Liberal Democrats win (new seat)			
Liberal Democrats win (new seat)			

=== Lexden ===
Lexden
Party	Candidate	Votes	%
Conservative	Sonia Lewis*	1,258	66.2
Conservative	Donald Henshall*	1,091	57.5
Liberal Democrats	Barbara Williamson	688	36.2
Labour	Alan Trudgian	239	12.6
Turnout		1,889	44.0
Registered electors		4,311	
Conservative hold			
Conservative hold			

=== Marks Tey ===
Marks Tey
Party	Candidate	Votes	%	±%
Conservative	Richard Gower*	405	64.7	−0.7
Labour	Edna Salmon	125	20.0	+0.4
Liberal Democrats	Mark Gray	96	15.3	+0.2
Majority		280	44.7	−1.1
Turnout		627	31.0	−2.0
Registered electors		2,009		
Conservative hold		Swing	▼0.6	

=== Mile End ===
Mile End
Party	Candidate	Votes	%
Conservative	Nicholas Taylor*	599	45.8
Conservative	Matthew Eaton	593	45.3
Liberal Democrats	Anne Turrell	546	41.7
Liberal Democrats	Alan Hayman	529	40.4
Conservative	Wendy Scattergood*	526	40.2
Labour	Lucy Wood	446	34.1
Independent	John Sutcliffe	187	14.3
Turnout		1,309	26.0
Registered electors		5,108	
Conservative hold			
Conservative gain from Liberal Democrats			
Liberal Democrats hold			

=== New Town ===
New Town
Party	Candidate	Votes	%
Liberal Democrats	Theresa Higgins*	970	60.7
Liberal Democrats	Peter Higgins	948	59.3
Liberal Democrats	Margaret Fisher	932	58.3
Labour	Jean Quinn	465	29.1
Conservative	Colin Beattie	267	16.7
Conservative	Glenn Bath	260	16.3
Conservative	Angus Allan	236	14.8
Turnout		1,599	26.0
Registered electors		6,079	
Liberal Democrats hold			
Liberal Democrats hold			
Liberal Democrats hold			

=== Prettygate ===
Prettygate
Party	Candidate	Votes	%
Liberal Democrats	Paul Sheppard*	1,015	45.3
Liberal Democrats	John Gray*	1,013	45.2
Conservative	Ron Levy	996	44.5
Conservative	Peter Crafford*	975	43.5
Liberal Democrats	Sandra Gray*	974	43.5
Conservative	Michael Pearson	940	42.0
Labour	Andrew Frost	326	14.6
Turnout		2,239	37.0
Registered electors		6,009	
Liberal Democrats hold			
Liberal Democrats hold			
Conservative hold			

=== Pyefleet ===
Pyefleet
Party	Candidate	Votes	%	±%
Conservative	Robert Davidson	581	66.9	+0.2
Liberal Democrats	Wilma Sutton	287	33.1	+16.1
Majority		294	33.9	−15.8
Turnout		875	43.0	+0.8
Registered electors		2,012		
Conservative hold		Swing	▼8.0	

No Labour candidate as previous (16.3%).

=== St. Andrew's ===
St Andrew's
Party	Candidate	Votes	%
Labour	Julie Young*	851	63.8
Labour	Don Quinn*	818	61.4
Labour	Tim Young*	808	60.6
Liberal Democrats	John Fellows	323	24.2
Conservative	Anne Allan	238	17.9
Conservative	Susan Burgoyne	213	16.0
Conservative	Pauline Lucas	203	15.2
Socialist Alliance	Jeremy Jepps	106	8.0
Turnout		1,333	20.0
Registered electors		6,696	
Labour hold			
Labour hold			
Labour hold			

=== St. Anne's ===
St Anne's
Party	Candidate	Votes	%
Liberal Democrats	Mike Hogg*	895	56.1
Liberal Democrats	Helen Chuah*	824	51.7
Liberal Democrats	Barrie Cook	785	49.2
Labour	Peter Brine	425	26.7
Labour	David Jonas	394	24.7
Labour	Paul Fryer-Kelsey	385	24.2
Conservative	Brigitte Beard	299	18.8
Conservative	Richard Lamberth	272	17.1
Conservative	Allan Doran	257	16.1
Turnout		1,594	25.0
Registered electors		6,488	
Liberal Democrats hold			
Liberal Democrats gain from Labour			
Liberal Democrats gain from Labour			

=== St. John's ===
St John's
Party	Candidate	Votes	%
Liberal Democrats	Ray Gamble*	1,030	69.5
Liberal Democrats	Paul Smith*	919	62.0
Conservative	Derek Smith	366	24.7
Conservative	Elizabeth Gorman	308	20.8
Labour	Anna Trudgian	123	8.3
Turnout		1,482	36.0
Registered electors		4,162	
Liberal Democrats hold			
Liberal Democrats hold			

=== Shrub End ===
Shrub End
Party	Candidate	Votes	%
Conservative	Winifred Foster	593	36.9
Conservative	Amanda Arnold	589	36.6
Conservative	Alan Scattergood	561	34.9
Labour	Richard Bourne*	553	34.4
Labour	Luke Dopson	520	32.3
Labour	Kim Naish	502	31.2
Liberal Democrats	Keith Hindle	490	30.5
Liberal Democrats	Bill Frame*	458	28.5
Liberal Democrats	Susan Waite	452	28.1
Turnout		1,608	25.0
Registered electors		6,338	
Conservative gain from Liberal Democrats			
Conservative gain from Labour			
Conservative gain from Labour			

=== Stanway ===
Stanway
Party	Candidate	Votes	%
Liberal Democrats	Colin Sykes	1,137	56.0
Liberal Democrats	Gwendoline Ilott*	1,099	54.2
Liberal Democrats	Leslie Scott-Boutell	1,043	51.4
Conservative	Jane Collier	730	36.0
Conservative	Jonathan Pyman*	717	35.3
Conservative	Michael Segal	670	33.0
Labour	Ian Yates	261	12.9
Turnout		2,029	34.0
Registered electors		5,930	
Liberal Democrats gain from Conservative			
Liberal Democrats hold			
Liberal Democrats hold			

=== Tiptree ===
Tiptree
Party	Candidate	Votes	%
Independent	Tony Webb*	757	44.8
Independent	John Elliott	620	36.7
Independent	Anne Burgess	617	36.5
Labour	Alan Mogridge*	569	33.7
Labour	Audrey Spencer	432	25.6
Conservative	Agnes Cannon	398	23.6
Conservative	Margaret Crowe	398	23.6
Conservative	John Reeves	354	21.0
Independent	Helen Bunney	330	19.5
Green	Stella Barnes	183	10.8
Turnout		1,689	29.0
Registered electors		5,793	
Independent gain from Residents			
Independent gain from Labour			
Independent gain from Labour			

=== West Bergholt & Eight Ash Green ===
West Bergholt & Eight Ash Green
Party	Candidate	Votes	%
Conservative	David Cannon*	757	60.7
Conservative	Jill Todd	692	55.4
Liberal Democrats	Una Jones	323	25.9
Labour	Gary Griffiths	287	23.0
Green	John Withers	238	19.1
Turnout		1,248	33.0
Registered electors		3,827	
Conservative hold			
Conservative hold			

=== West Mersea ===
West Mersea
Party	Candidate	Votes	%
Conservative	John Jowers*	1,348	74.3
Conservative	John Bouckley*	1,184	65.3
Conservative	Margaret Kimberley*	1,136	62.6
Labour	Bry Mogridge	430	23.7
Liberal Democrats	Ronald Baker	389	21.4
Turnout		1,814	31.0
Registered electors		5,801	
Conservative hold			
Conservative hold			
Conservative hold			

=== Wivenhoe Cross ===
Wivenhoe Cross
Party	Candidate	Votes	%
Labour	Philip Hawkins*	369	56.1
Conservative	David Adams	303	46.0
Conservative	Kenneth Rogers	290	44.1
Labour	David Purdy	184	28.0
Liberal Democrats	John Galpin	167	25.4
Liberal Democrats	Patrick Mossop	149	22.6
Turnout		658	17.0
Registered electors		3,986	
Labour win (new seat)			
Conservative win (new seat)			

=== Wivenhoe Quay ===
Wivenhoe Quay
Party	Candidate	Votes	%
Labour	Bob Newman*	592	40.7
Independent	Samuel Davies	567	38.9
Labour	Stephen Ford	523	35.9
Conservative	Eugene Kraft	412	28.3
Conservative	Elizabeth Corke	399	27.4
Green	Christopher Fox	231	15.9
Turnout		1,456	38.0
Registered electors		3,825	
Labour win (new seat)			
Independent win (new seat)			
