= 2002 West Lindsey District Council election =

2002 UK local government election

Elections to West Lindsey District Council were held on 2 May 2002. One third of the council was up for election and the council stayed under no overall control.

After the election, the composition of the council was:

- Conservative 13
- Liberal Democrat 13
- Independent 8
- Labour 3

== Election result ==
West Lindsey local election result 2002
Party	Seats	Gains	Losses	Net gain/loss	Seats %	Votes %	Votes	+/−
Conservative	8	4	0	+4	66.7	42.6	4,297	+5.9%
Liberal Democrats	2	0	3	-3	16.7	31.9	3,223	-19.1%
Labour	1	0	0	0	8.3	14.1	1,424	+9.2%
Independent	1	0	1	-1	8.3	11.4	1,154	+3.9%

== Ward results ==
Bardney
Party	Candidate	Votes	%	±%
Conservative	Ian Fleetwood	501	72.4	+13.1
Liberal Democrats	John Turner	191	27.6	−13.1
Majority		310	44.8	+26.2
Turnout		692	46.8	−6.3
Conservative hold		Swing		

Cherry Willingham
Party	Candidate	Votes	%	±%
Conservative	Irmgard Parrott	706	53.7	+53.7
Liberal Democrats	Adrian Heath	436	33.2	−9.9
Labour	Tara-Louise Burghardt	173	13.2	+13.2
Majority		270	20.5	
Turnout		1,315	41.6	+11.4
Conservative hold		Swing		

Fiskerton
Party	Candidate	Votes	%	±%
Conservative	Margaret Davidson	251	49.9	+49.9
Liberal Democrats	Roy Harris	133	26.4	−5.7
Labour	Sally Scott	119	23.7	+23.7
Majority		118	23.5	
Turnout		503	33.7	+6.2
Conservative gain from Independent		Swing		

Gainsborough East
Party	Candidate	Votes	%	±%
Liberal Democrats	Melvyn Starkey	424	56.8	−19.4
Labour	Deborah Rose	217	29.0	+29.0
Conservative	Stephen Beer	106	14.2	−9.6
Majority		207	27.8	−24.6
Turnout		747	17.2	+0.4
Liberal Democrats hold		Swing		

Gainsborough North
Party	Candidate	Votes	%	±%
Labour	Irene Tyson	403	36.3	+36.3
Liberal Democrats	Kristan Smith	369	33.2	−30.1
Conservative	Robert Gore	339	30.5	−6.2
Majority		34	3.1	
Turnout		1,111	22.5	+5.0
Labour hold		Swing		

Hemswell
Party	Candidate	Votes	%	±%
Conservative	Colin Wotherspoon	398	61.4	+14.3
Liberal Democrats	William Gabbott	250	38.6	−14.3
Majority		148	22.8	
Turnout		648	35.7	+0.9
Conservative gain from Liberal Democrats		Swing		

Market Rasen
Party	Candidate	Votes	%	±%
Conservative	Adam Duguid	563	48.5	+14.2
Liberal Democrats	Neil Taylor	484	41.7	−18.9
Labour	Philip Huckin	115	9.9	+4.8
Majority		79	6.8	−19.5
Turnout		1,162	31.1	−2.3
Conservative gain from Liberal Democrats		Swing		

Nettleham
Party	Candidate	Votes	%	±%
Independent	Alfred Frith	944	74.8	+74.8
Conservative	Rodney Stainton	318	25.2	−9.9
Majority		626	49.6	+19.8
Turnout		1,262	35.6	−6.8
Independent hold		Swing		

Scampton
Party	Candidate	Votes	%	±%
Liberal Democrats	Peter Heath	567	75.2	+4.6
Conservative	Peter Randall	187	24.8	−4.6
Majority		380	50.4	−0.8
Turnout		754	38.0	+3.3
Liberal Democrats hold		Swing		

Thonock
Party	Candidate	Votes	%	±%
Conservative	Keeley Henderson	271	43.5	+9.1
Labour	Paul Chappelow	181	29.1	+29.1
Liberal Democrats	David Clack	171	27.4	−38.2
Majority		90	14.4	
Turnout		623	33.2	+2.8
Conservative gain from Liberal Democrats		Swing		

Waddingham & Spital
Party	Candidate	Votes	%	±%
Conservative	Jeffrey Summers	381	48.3	−13.9
Independent	Ernest Coleman	210	26.6	+26.6
Liberal Democrats	Andrew Heathorn	198	25.1	−12.7
Majority		171	21.7	−2.7
Turnout		789	46.2	+6.8
Conservative hold		Swing		

Wold View
Party	Candidate	Votes	%	±%
Conservative	Bernard Theobald	276	56.1	+14.7
Labour	Frank Thomas	216	43.9	+24.6
Majority		60	12.2	+10.1
Turnout		492	27.9	−7.5
Conservative hold		Swing		
