= 2002 Tandridge District Council election =

2002 UK local government election

Map of the results of the 2002 Tandridge District Council election. Conservatives in blue and Liberal Democrats in yellow. Wards in grey were not contested in 2002.

The 2002 Tandridge District Council election took place on 2 May 2002 to elect members of Tandridge District Council in Surrey, England. One third of the council was up for election and the Conservative Party stayed in overall control of the council.

After the election, the composition of the council was:

- Conservative 29
- Liberal Democrat 10
- Labour 3

== Election result ==
Tandridge local election result 2002
| Party | Seats | Gains | Losses | Net gain/loss | Seats % | Votes % | Votes | +/− |
|---|---|---|---|---|---|---|---|---|
| Conservative | 11 | | | 0 | 78.6 | 50.1 | 9,981 | |
| Liberal Democrats | 3 | | | 0 | 21.4 | 35.7 | 7,112 | |
| Labour | 0 | | | 0 | 0 | 9.6 | 1,908 | |
| Independent | 0 | | | 0 | 0 | 2.3 | 457 | |
| UKIP | 0 | | | 0 | 0 | 1.8 | 362 | |
| Green | 0 | | | 0 | 0 | 0.5 | 94 | |

== Ward results ==
Bletchingley and Nuffield
| Party | Candidate | Votes | % | ±% |
|---|---|---|---|---|
| Conservative | Sally Herrtage | 883 | 57.2 | |
| Liberal Democrats | Richard Fowler | 537 | 34.8 | |
| Labour | Hubert Cockerham | 125 | 8.1 | |
| Majority | | 346 | 22.4 | |
| Turnout | | 1,545 | | |

Burstow, Horne and Outwood
| Party | Candidate | Votes | % | ±% |
|---|---|---|---|---|
| Conservative | Alan Brown | 778 | 54.8 | |
| Liberal Democrats | John Brock | 548 | 38.6 | |
| Green | Sandra Crittell | 94 | 6.6 | |
| Majority | | 230 | 16.2 | |
| Turnout | | 1,420 | | |

Dormansland and Felcourt
| Party | Candidate | Votes | % | ±% |
|---|---|---|---|---|
| Conservative | Michael Sydney | 708 | 59.2 | |
| Liberal Democrats | Mavis Tettmar | 432 | 36.2 | |
| Labour | Ruth Allonby | 55 | 4.6 | |
| Majority | | 276 | 23.0 | |
| Turnout | | 1,195 | | |

Godstone
| Party | Candidate | Votes | % | ±% |
|---|---|---|---|---|
| Liberal Democrats | Colin White | 848 | 47.5 | |
| Conservative | Hamish Beaton | 823 | 46.1 | |
| Labour | Maxine Mathews | 116 | 6.5 | |
| Majority | | 25 | 1.4 | |
| Turnout | | 1,787 | | |

Harestone
| Party | Candidate | Votes | % | ±% |
|---|---|---|---|---|
| Conservative | Stuart Sinclair-Smith | 718 | 52.1 | |
| Liberal Democrats | Anthea Hopkins | 607 | 44.0 | |
| Labour | John Ellis | 53 | 3.8 | |
| Majority | | 111 | 8.1 | |
| Turnout | | 1,378 | | |

Limpsfield
| Party | Candidate | Votes | % | ±% |
|---|---|---|---|---|
| Conservative | Eric Morgan | 761 | 66.0 | |
| Liberal Democrats | Mark Wilson | 338 | 29.3 | |
| Labour | Philip Gunner | 54 | 4.7 | |
| Majority | | 423 | 36.7 | |
| Turnout | | 1,153 | | |

Lingfield and Crowhurst
| Party | Candidate | Votes | % | ±% |
|---|---|---|---|---|
| Conservative | Brian Perkins | 715 | 49.9 | |
| Liberal Democrats | Anne Dalrymple | 644 | 44.9 | |
| Labour | Lynn Bappa | 75 | 5.2 | |
| Majority | | 71 | 5.0 | |
| Turnout | | 1,434 | | |

Oxted North and Tandridge
| Party | Candidate | Votes | % | ±% |
|---|---|---|---|---|
| Conservative | Antony Cherrett | 854 | 48.0 | |
| Liberal Democrats | Matthew Griffiths | 469 | 26.3 | |
| Independent | Joshua Cosnett | 457 | 25.7 | |
| Majority | | 385 | 21.7 | |
| Turnout | | 1,780 | | |

Oxted South
| Party | Candidate | Votes | % | ±% |
|---|---|---|---|---|
| Conservative | Barry Compton | 850 | 39.5 | |
| Labour | Katherine Saunders | 763 | 35.4 | |
| Liberal Democrats | Ceri Lewis | 298 | 13.8 | |
| UKIP | Anthony Stone | 243 | 11.3 | |
| Majority | | 87 | 4.1 | |
| Turnout | | 2,154 | | |

Queens Park
| Party | Candidate | Votes | % | ±% |
|---|---|---|---|---|
| Conservative | Matthew Groves | 705 | 48.3 | |
| Liberal Democrats | John Orrick | 678 | 46.4 | |
| Labour | Victoria Kennedy | 78 | 5.3 | |
| Majority | | 27 | 1.9 | |
| Turnout | | 1,461 | | |

Warlingham East, Chelsham and Farleigh
| Party | Candidate | Votes | % | ±% |
|---|---|---|---|---|
| Liberal Democrats | Simon Morrow | 770 | 46.6 | |
| Conservative | John Aust | 628 | 38.0 | |
| Labour | George Holman | 135 | 8.2 | |
| UKIP | Martin Haley | 119 | 7.2 | |
| Majority | | 142 | 8.6 | |
| Turnout | | 1,652 | | |

Warlingham West
| Party | Candidate | Votes | % | ±% |
|---|---|---|---|---|
| Conservative | Glynis Whittle | 727 | 68.1 | |
| Liberal Democrats | Barry Newsome | 285 | 26.7 | |
| Labour | Raymond Garwood | 55 | 5.2 | |
| Majority | | 442 | 41.4 | |
| Turnout | | 1,067 | | |

Westway
| Party | Candidate | Votes | % | ±% |
|---|---|---|---|---|
| Conservative | Rosalind Langham | 477 | 50.3 | |
| Labour | Robin Clements | 344 | 36.3 | |
| Liberal Democrats | Sarah Burningham | 127 | 13.4 | |
| Majority | | 133 | 14.0 | |
| Turnout | | 948 | | |

Whyteleafe
| Party | Candidate | Votes | % | ±% |
|---|---|---|---|---|
| Liberal Democrats | Sakina Bradbury | 531 | 56.5 | |
| Conservative | John Morriss | 354 | 37.7 | |
| Labour | Charmaine Morgan | 55 | 5.9 | |
| Majority | | 177 | 18.8 | |
| Turnout | | 940 | | |
