= 2002 Carlisle City Council election =

2002 UK local government election

Map of the results of the 2002 Carlisle City Council election. Labour in red, Conservatives in blue and Liberal Democrats in yellow. Wards in grey were not contested in 2002.

The 2002 Carlisle City Council election took place on 2 May 2002 to elect members of Carlisle District Council in Cumbria, England. One third of the council was up for election and the Conservative Party stayed in overall control of the council.

After the election, the composition of the council was:

- Conservative 27
- Labour 18
- Liberal Democrats 5
- Independent 2

== Election result ==
The Conservatives retained a majority on the council, despite losing 2 seats to Labour. Overall turnout at the election was 31.7%.

Carlisle local election result 2002
Party	Seats	Gains	Losses	Net gain/loss	Seats %	Votes %	Votes	+/−
Labour	8			+2	47.1	43.9	9,850	
Conservative	7			-2	41.2	42.9	9,627	
Liberal Democrats	2			0	11.8	11.0	2,471	
Independent	0			0	0	2.1	468	
Legalise Cannabis	0			0	0	0.1	26	

== Ward results ==
Belah
Party	Candidate	Votes	%	±%
Conservative	Sandra Fisher	936	60.3	
Labour	Roger Horne	617	39.7	
Majority		319	20.5	
Turnout		1,553		

Belle Vue
Party	Candidate	Votes	%	±%
Labour	Kenneth Rutherford	574	48.4	
Conservative	Neville Lishman	450	37.9	
Liberal Democrats	Olwyn Luckley	137	11.5	
Legalise Cannabis	Colin Paisley	26	2.2	
Majority		124	10.4	
Turnout		1,187		

Botcherby
Party	Candidate	Votes	%	±%
Labour	Anne Glendinning	761	63.1	
Conservative	Teresa Cartner	445	36.9	
Majority		316	26.2	
Turnout		1,206		

Brampton
Party	Candidate	Votes	%	±%
Conservative	Michael Mitchelson	744	71.1	
Labour	John Hale	302	28.9	
Majority		442	42.3	
Turnout		1,046		

Castle
Party	Candidate	Votes	%	±%
Liberal Democrats	John Guest	549	49.1	
Labour	Thomas Johnson	373	33.4	
Conservative	Clark Vasay	195	17.5	
Majority		176	15.8	
Turnout		1,117		

Currock
Party	Candidate	Votes	%	±%
Labour	Heather Bradley	817	77.7	
Conservative	Teresa Preston	235	22.3	
Majority		582	55.3	
Turnout		1,052		

Dalston
Party	Candidate	Votes	%	±%
Conservative	Lucy Crookdale	766	48.4	
Liberal Democrats	Trevor Allison	537	33.9	
Labour	Raymond Warwick	281	17.7	
Majority		229	14.5	
Turnout		1,584		

Denton Holme
Party	Candidate	Votes	%	±%
Labour	Paul Atkinson	833	67.5	
Conservative	Anthony Fontes	217	17.6	
Liberal Democrats	Allan Stevenson	184	14.9	
Majority		616	49.9	
Turnout		1,234		

Harraby
Party	Candidate	Votes	%	±%
Labour	Joseph Weedall	868	62.1	
Conservative	Michelle Gwillim	529	37.9	
Majority		339	24.3	
Turnout		1,397		

Longtown and Rockliffe
Party	Candidate	Votes	%	±%
Conservative	Raynor Bloxham	528	59.2	
Labour	Robert Dodds	364	40.8	
Majority		164	18.4	
Turnout		892		

Morton
Party	Candidate	Votes	%	±%
Liberal Democrats	John Farmer	907	51.0	
Labour	Grant Warwick	691	38.8	
Conservative	Henry Stordy	182	10.2	
Majority		216	12.1	
Turnout		1,780		

St. Aidans
Party	Candidate	Votes	%	±%
Labour	Anne Quilter	881	59.8	
Conservative	John Lee	593	40.2	
Majority		288	19.5	
Turnout		1,474		

Stanwix Rural
Party	Candidate	Votes	%	±%
Conservative	Marilyn Bowman	803	77.6	
Labour	Alex Faulds	232	22.4	
Majority		571	55.2	
Turnout		1,035		

Stanwix Urban
Party	Candidate	Votes	%	±%
Conservative	Elizabeth Mallinson	1,126	65.8	
Labour	Keith Aitken	585	34.2	
Majority		541	31.6	
Turnout		1,711		

Upperby
Party	Candidate	Votes	%	±%
Labour	David Wilson	942	69.2	
Conservative	Richard Hyslop	419	30.8	
Majority		523	38.4	
Turnout		1,361		

Wetheral
Party	Candidate	Votes	%	±%
Conservative	Donald Joscelyne	751	61.6	
Independent	Robert Wickings	468	38.4	
Majority		283	23.2	
Turnout		1,219		

Yewdale
Party	Candidate	Votes	%	±%
Labour	George Stothard	729	45.7	
Conservative	Elizabeth Blackadder	708	44.4	
Liberal Democrats	Raymond Langstone	157	9.8	
Majority		21	1.3	
Turnout		1,594		
