= 2002 Sheffield City Council election =

- 2 May 2002

One third of seats (29 of 87) to Sheffield City Council 44 seats needed for a majority
	First party	Second party	Third party
Party	Labour	Liberal Democrats	Conservative
Seats won	19	10	0
Seat change	▲7	▼5	0
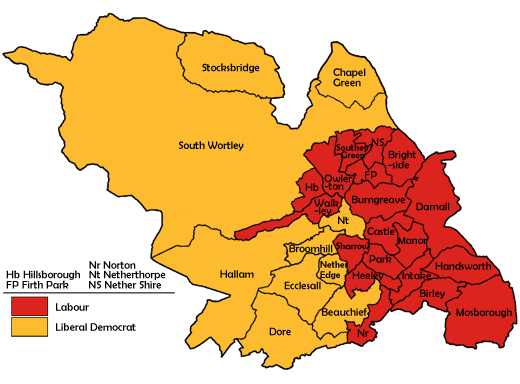
- Map showing the results of the 2002 Sheffield City Council elections.
Majority party before election
Liberal Democrats
Majority party after election
No Overall Control

Sheffield City Council elections took place on 2 May 2002. One third of seats were up for election. Since the previous election, the Liberal Democrats and Labour had each suffered one defection - Ronald Shepherd left the Labour grouping to sit as an Independent and Lib Dem Matthew Dixon defected, firstly as an Independent and then to the Conservatives. In this time an earlier Lib Dem defector, Trefor Morgan, also changed from an Independent to Liberal.

Following this election, the council returned to no overall control, as the sizable swing from Lib Dem to Labour allowed Labour to gain five seats directly from the Lib Dems, and two from earlier defections, making Labour narrowly the largest party with 43 seats to the Lib Dem's 42. Overall turnout was 30.0%.

== Election result ==
Sheffield local election result 2002
Party	Seats	Gains	Losses	Net gain/loss	Seats %	Votes %	Votes	+/−
Labour	19	7	0	+7	65.5	44.5	50,165	+7.2
Liberal Democrats	10	0	5	-5	34.5	36.6	41,214	-8.4
Conservative	0	0	0	0	0.0	13.6	15,338	-0.5
Green	0	0	0	0	0.0	3.3	3,764	+1.1
Socialist Alliance	0	0	0	0	0.0	0.7	834	+0.6
Independent Labour	0	0	1	-1	0.0	0.5	526	-0.6
UKIP	0	0	0	0	0.0	0.4	442	New
Independent	0	0	0	0	0.0	0.2	207	N/A
Socialist Labour	0	0	0	0	0.0	0.1	106	±0.0
Socialist	0	0	0	0	0.0	0.1	101	-0.1

This result had the following consequences for the total number of seats on the council after the elections:

Party	Previous council	New council
Labour	36	43
Liberal Democrats	47	42
Conservatives	2	2
Independent Labour	1	0
Liberal	1	0
Total	87	87
Working majority	7	-1

== Ward results ==
Beauchief
Party	Candidate	Votes	%	±%
Liberal Democrats	Peter Moore*	2,740	52.2	−7.6
Labour	Beverly Wright	1,603	30.6	+4.4
Conservative	Christine Bradley	677	12.9	−1.0
Independent	Gemma Lock	207	3.9	+3.9
Rejected ballots		16	0.3	
Majority		1,137	21.7	−12.0
Turnout		5,243	36.4	+3.7
Liberal Democrats hold		Swing	-6.0	

Birley
Party	Candidate	Votes	%	±%
Labour	Mike Pye	2,775	58.0	+9.3
Liberal Democrats	Judy Webster	1,723	36.0	−8.0
Conservative	Evelyn Millward	282	5.9	−1.5
Rejected ballots		7	0.1	
Majority		1,052	22.0	+17.3
Turnout		4,787	34.2	+3.5
Labour gain from Independent Labour		Swing	+8.6	

Brightside
Party	Candidate	Votes	%	±%
Labour	Alf Meade*	1,891	71.6	+7.8
Conservative	Pat Maloney	380	14.4	+3.5
Liberal Democrats	Jawaid Qazi	256	9.7	−12.3
Socialist Labour	Robert Morris	106	4.0	+0.6
Rejected ballots		9	0.3	
Majority		1,635	57.2	+20.2
Turnout		2,642	23.6	+4.7
Labour hold		Swing	+2.1	

Broomhill
Party	Candidate	Votes	%	±%
Liberal Democrats	Alan Whitehouse*	2,192	55.4	−1.9
Labour	Martin Newsome	705	17.8	−3.3
Conservative	Mark Fox	566	14.3	+0.0
Green	Gillian Booth	438	11.1	+3.8
UKIP	Nigel James	35	0.9	+0.9
Rejected ballots		20	0.5	
Majority		1,487	37.6	+1.4
Turnout		3,956	26.0	+1.4
Liberal Democrats hold		Swing	+0.7	

Burngreave
Party	Candidate	Votes	%	±%
Labour	Jackie Field	1,555	61.1	+23.7
Liberal Democrats	Mohammed Hafiz	485	19.1	−4.8
Conservative	Nicholas Bryan	184	7.2	−1.0
Socialist Alliance	Alison Brown	159	6.2	+4.2
Green	Chris Sissons	145	5.7	+2.4
Rejected ballots		15	0.6	
Majority		1,070	42.1	+28.5
Turnout		2,543	29.7	+2.0
Labour hold		Swing	+14.2	

Castle
Party	Candidate	Votes	%	±%
Labour	Mike King*	1,414	70.1	+4.7
Liberal Democrats	Michael Coleman	259	12.8	−5.3
Green	Graham Wroe	190	9.4	+3.9
Conservative	Michael Young	148	7.3	−1.3
Rejected ballots		6	0.3	
Majority		1,155	57.2	+10.1
Turnout		2,017	23.4	+3.7
Labour hold		Swing	+5.0	

Chapel Green
Party	Candidate	Votes	%	±%
Liberal Democrats	Pat Fox	2,333	48.5	−6.8
Labour	Sheila Tyler	2,072	43.0	+7.1
Conservative	Anne Smith	394	8.2	−0.6
Rejected ballots		13	0.3	
Majority		261	5.4	−13.9
Turnout		4,812	26.7	+3.7
Liberal Democrats hold		Swing	-6.9	

Darnall
Party	Candidate	Votes	%	±%
Labour	Mohammad Altaf	2,287	53.4	−4.8
Liberal Democrats	Shaffaq Mohammed	1,212	28.3	−5.5
UKIP	Jonathan Arnott	407	9.5	+9.5
Conservative	Gordon Millward	357	8.3	+0.3
Rejected ballots		21	0.5	
Majority		1,075	25.1	+0.7
Turnout		4,284	32.3	+5.0
Labour hold		Swing	+0.3	

Dore
Party	Candidate	Votes	%	±%
Liberal Democrats	Colin Ross*	3,208	48.6	+7.4
Conservative	Graham King	2,506	38.0	−8.6
Labour	Don Henderson	701	10.6	−1.5
Green	Dawn Biram	166	2.5	+2.5
Rejected ballots		12	0.2	
Majority		702	10.6	+5.3
Turnout		6,593	44.7	+4.9
Liberal Democrats hold		Swing	+4.0	

Ecclesall
Party	Candidate	Votes	%	±%
Liberal Democrats	Roger Davison*	3,481	57.1	−0.1
Conservative	Kevin Mahoney	1,884	30.9	+3.6
Labour	Farhat Rafiq	694	11.4	+0.1
Rejected ballots		40	0.6	
Majority		1,597	26.2	−3.7
Turnout		6,099	40.5	+2.9
Liberal Democrats hold		Swing	-1.8	

Firth Park
Party	Candidate	Votes	%	±%
Labour	Joan Barton*	2,271	80.2	+13.8
Liberal Democrats	Mohammed Nazir	300	10.6	−11.0
Conservative	Neville Paling	235	8.3	−3.6
Rejected ballots		25	0.9	
Majority		1,971	69.6	+24.9
Turnout		2,831	25.5	+4.8
Labour hold		Swing	+12.4	

Hallam
Party	Candidate	Votes	%	±%
Liberal Democrats	Duncan Kime*	3,746	56.0	+0.1
Conservative	Alan Ryder	2,046	30.6	+0.8
Labour	William Breakell	878	13.1	−1.1
Rejected ballots		16	0.2	
Majority		1,700	25.4	−0.7
Turnout		6,686	46.7	+7.8
Liberal Democrats hold		Swing	-0.3	

Handsworth
Party	Candidate	Votes	%	±%
Labour	Ray Satur*	2,426	64.3	+9.1
Independent Labour	Elsie Smith	526	13.9	−1.3
Liberal Democrats	Allan Wisbey	430	11.4	−8.2
Conservative	Laurence Hayward	386	10.2	+0.3
Rejected ballots		4	0.1	
Majority		1,996	50.4	+17.4
Turnout		3,772	26.8	+3.5
Labour hold		Swing	+5.2	

Heeley
Party	Candidate	Votes	%	±%
Labour	Terence Fox	1,878	44.0	+5.9
Liberal Democrats	Steve Ayris*	1,476	34.5	−13.8
Green	Robert Unwin	496	11.6	+3.9
Conservative	Deborah Richmond	229	5.3	−0.6
Socialist Alliance	Richard Pitt	186	4.3	+4.3
Rejected ballots		6	0.1	
Majority		402	9.4	−0.9
Turnout		4,271	33.6	+6.8
Labour gain from Liberal Democrats		Swing	+9.8	

Hillsborough
Party	Candidate	Votes	%	±%
Labour	Robert MacDonald	2,019	47.9	+11.9
Liberal Democrats	Chris Tosseano*	1,434	34.0	−16.5
Conservative	Thomas Seaton	415	9.8	+0.1
Green	Chris McMahon	237	5.6	+1.7
Socialist Alliance	Nicholas Riley	106	2.5	+2.5
Rejected ballots		6	0.1	
Majority		585	13.9	−0.7
Turnout		4,217	30.5	+4.6
Labour gain from Liberal Democrats		Swing	+14.2	

Intake
Party	Candidate	Votes	%	±%
Labour	Martin Lawton	2,213	53.1	+11.1
Liberal Democrats	Louise Truman*	1,460	35.0	−15.2
Conservative	Freda Hutchinson	325	7.8	+0.1
Green	Eamonn Ward	143	3.4	+3.4
Rejected ballots		24	0.6	
Majority		753	18.1	+9.8
Turnout		4,165	29.8	+4.0
Labour gain from Liberal Democrats		Swing	+13.1	

Manor
Party	Candidate	Votes	%	±%
Labour	Jan Fiore*	1,354	75.7	+9.5
Liberal Democrats	Tony Fox	257	14.4	−2.3
Conservative	Andrew Watson	177	9.9	+0.1
Rejected ballots		0	0.0	
Majority		1,097	61.3	+11.8
Turnout		1,788	21.9	+4.0
Labour hold		Swing	+5.9	

Mosborough
Party	Candidate	Votes	%	±%
Labour	Samuel Wall	3,570	61.0	+10.1
Liberal Democrats	Mike Reynolds	1,153	19.7	−12.8
Conservative	Shirley Clayton	1,093	18.7	+2.0
Rejected ballots		37	0.6	
Majority		2,417	41.3	+23.0
Turnout		5,853	22.2	+3.2
Labour hold		Swing	+11.4	

Nether Edge
Party	Candidate	Votes	%	±%
Liberal Democrats	Andy White*	2,275	49.0	−10.5
Labour	Nick Simmonite	1,345	29.0	+4.2
Green	Mervyn Smith	448	9.6	+2.1
Conservative	Qari Siddique	345	7.4	−0.6
Socialist Alliance	James Oliver	215	4.6	+4.6
Rejected ballots		9	0.2	
Majority		930	20.0	−14.8
Turnout		4,637	38.7	+6.8
Liberal Democrats hold		Swing	-7.3	

Nether Shire
Party	Candidate	Votes	%	±%
Labour	Doreen Newton*	2,075	77.2	+13.6
Liberal Democrats	Jim Tosseano	342	12.7	−11.2
Conservative	Marie Weston	259	9.6	−1.0
Rejected ballots		10	0.4	
Majority		1,733	64.5	+24.9
Turnout		2,686	23.9	+4.5
Labour hold		Swing	+12.4	

Netherthorpe
Party	Candidate	Votes	%	±%
Liberal Democrats	Brian Holmes*	1,367	45.2	−11.3
Labour	John Campbell	1,005	33.2	+4.2
Green	Bernard Little	510	16.8	+6.5
Conservative	Ian Ramsey	126	4.1	−0.0
Rejected ballots		18	0.6	
Majority		362	11.9	−15.6
Turnout		3,026	25.3	+4.0
Liberal Democrats hold		Swing	-7.7	

Norton
Party	Candidate	Votes	%	±%
Labour	Garry Weatherall	1,714	47.6	+10.5
Liberal Democrats	Gail Smith*	1,341	37.3	−15.4
Conservative	Peter Smith	360	10.0	−0.1
Green	Peter Hartley	150	4.2	+4.2
Rejected ballots		31	0.8	
Majority		373	10.4	−5.1
Turnout		3,596	32.7	+4.4
Labour gain from Liberal Democrats		Swing	+12.9	

Owlerton
Party	Candidate	Votes	%	±%
Labour	James Hanson	2,137	77.0	+21.2
Liberal Democrats	Dave Dawson	365	13.1	−22.7
Conservative	Eric Kirby	207	7.4	−0.8
Socialist Alliance	Richard Morris	54	1.9	+1.9
Rejected ballots		10	0.3	
Majority		1,772	63.9	+43.9
Turnout		2,773	25.9	+4.8
Labour gain from Liberal		Swing	+21.9	

Park
Party	Candidate	Votes	%	±%
Labour	Julie Dore*	1,403	61.4	+20.2
Liberal Democrats	Krystyna Haywood	656	28.7	−26.2
Socialist	Terry Wykes	101	4.4	+3.2
Conservative	Mike Ginn	74	3.2	+0.5
Green	Steve Marshall	49	2.1	+2.1
Rejected ballots		3	0.1	
Majority		747	32.7	+19.0
Turnout		2,286	25.1	−0.6
Labour hold		Swing	+23.2	

Sharrow
Party	Candidate	Votes	%	±%
Labour	Jean Cromar*	1,475	56.2	−1.8
Liberal Democrats	Haq Hawaz	497	18.9	−6.2
Green	Jillian Creasy	321	12.2	+3.7
Conservative	Celia Dutton	199	7.6	−0.7
Socialist Alliance	Angela Shann	114	4.3	+4.3
Rejected ballots		20	0.7	
Majority		978	37.2	+4.4
Turnout		2,626	22.9	+2.9
Labour hold		Swing	+2.2	

South Wortley
Party	Candidate	Votes	%	±%
Liberal Democrats	Vic Bowden*	2,529	44.7	−13.2
Labour	Mike Furniss	2,209	39.1	+10.9
Conservative	James Dale	892	15.8	+1.9
Rejected ballots		21	0.4	
Majority		320	5.6	−24.1
Turnout		5,651	30.4	+4.6
Liberal Democrats hold		Swing	-12.0	

Southey Green
Party	Candidate	Votes	%	±%
Labour	Steve Wilson	1,781	81.2	+10.7
Liberal Democrats	John Bowden	254	11.6	−7.3
Conservative	Marjorie Kirby	158	7.2	−3.4
Rejected ballots		1	0.0	
Majority		1,527	69.6	+18.0
Turnout		2,194	23.1	+4.6
Labour hold		Swing	+9.0	

Stocksbridge
Party	Candidate	Votes	%	±%
Liberal Democrats	Martin Brelsford*	1,708	60.5	−4.2
Labour	Stephanie Thomas	869	30.8	+6.6
Conservative	Paula Axelby	226	8.0	−3.0
Rejected ballots		18	0.6	
Majority		839	29.7	−10.9
Turnout		2,821	26.6	+3.5
Liberal Democrats hold		Swing	-5.4	

Walkley
Party	Candidate	Votes	%	±%
Labour	Veronica Hardstaff	1,846	43.2	+8.3
Liberal Democrats	Vickie Priestley*	1,735	40.6	−13.7
Green	Nicola Freeman	471	11.0	+2.6
Conservative	Peter Smith	208	4.9	−0.6
Rejected ballots		14	0.3	
Majority		111	2.6	−13.3
Turnout		4,274	32.1	+4.1
Labour gain from Liberal Democrats		Swing	+11.0	
