= 2002 Rochford District Council election =

2002 UK local government election

Results of the 2002 Rochford District Council election

Elections to Rochford Council were held on 2 May 2002. The whole council was up for election with boundary changes since the last election in 2000 reducing the number of seats by 1. The Conservative party gained overall control of the council from no overall control.

== Election result ==
Rochford local election result 2002
Party	Seats	Gains	Losses	Net gain/loss	Seats %	Votes %	Votes	+/−
Conservative	28			+9	71.8	51.9	14,934	
Labour	4			-5	10.3	24.8	7,144	
Liberal Democrats	4			-5	10.3	17.3	4,985	
Independent	2			+1	5.1	2.0	563	
Hawkwell Resident	1			-1	2.6	2.1	595	
Green	0			0	0	1.9	547	

8 Conservative and 1 Independent candidates were unopposed.

== Ward results ==
=== Ashingdon and Canewdon ===
Ashingdon and Canewdon (2)
Party	Candidate	Votes	%	±%
Conservative	Terence Cutmore	522		
Conservative	Tracy Capon	521		
Labour	Sheila Downard	203		
Green	Andrew Vaughan	184		
Labour	David Lench	160		
Turnout		1,590		

=== Barling and Sutton ===
Barling and Sutton
Party	Candidate	Votes	%	±%
Independent	Robin Allen	unopposed		

=== Downhall and Rawreth ===
Downhall and Rawreth (2)
Party	Candidate	Votes	%	±%
Liberal Democrats	Christopher Black	732		
Liberal Democrats	Ronald Oatham	696		
Conservative	Delya Savill	291		
Conservative	Joan Mockford	288		
Turnout		2,007		

=== Foulness and Great Wakering ===
Foulness and Great Wakering (3)
Party	Candidate	Votes	%	±%
Conservative	Trevor Goodwin	784		
Conservative	Barbara Wilkins	676		
Conservative	Colin Seagers	626		
Labour	Peter Stebbing	601		
Labour	Kevin Salt	494		
Turnout		3,181		

=== Grange ===
Grange (2)
Party	Candidate	Votes	%	±%
Liberal Democrats	Christoper Lumley	525		
Liberal Democrats	June Lumley	508		
Conservative	Roland Adams	346		
Conservative	Paul Morgan	321		
Turnout		1,700		

=== Hawkwell North ===
Hawkwell North (2)
Party	Candidate	Votes	%	±%
Conservative	Maureen Starke	586		
Conservative	Michael Starke	586		
Labour	David Thompson	284		
Labour	Dorothy Thompson	259		
Turnout		1,715		

=== Hawkwell South ===
Hawkwell South (2)
Party	Candidate	Votes	%	±%
Independent	Heather Glynn	410		
Conservative	Philip Capon	371		
Conservative	Keith Gordon	365		
Liberal Democrats	Victor Leach	242		
Labour	Diane Fraser	177		
Labour	Ian Rooke	141		
Turnout		1,706		

=== Hawkwell West ===
Hawkwell West (2)
Party	Candidate	Votes	%	±%
Hawkwell Resident	John Mason	595		
Labour	Myra Weir	436		
Labour	David Weir	339		
Conservative	Derrick Stansby	335		
Conservative	Terry Fawell	280		
Turnout		1,985		

=== Hockley Central ===
Hockley Central (3)
Party	Candidate	Votes	%	±%
Conservative	Marina McCarthy	unopposed		
Conservative	Elizabeth Marlow	unopposed		
Conservative	Jeremy Thomass	unopposed		

=== Hockley North ===
Hockley North
Party	Candidate	Votes	%	±%
Conservative	Colin Hungate	284	64.1	
Green	Lee Howes	159	35.9	
Majority		125	28.2	
Turnout		443		

=== Hockley West ===
Hockley West
Party	Candidate	Votes	%	±%
Conservative	Liv Hungate	unopposed		

=== Hullbridge ===
Hullbridge (3)
Party	Candidate	Votes	%	±%
Conservative	Rosemary Brown	730		
Labour	Christopher Morgan	725		
Labour	David Flack	698		
Labour	Mary Stevenson	679		
Conservative	Lesley Butcher	606		
Conservative	Flora Noe	569		
Turnout		4,007		

=== Lodge ===
Lodge (2)
Party	Candidate	Votes	%	±%
Conservative	Colin Langlands	445		
Conservative	Terry Livings	435		
Liberal Democrats	June Daynes	321		
Green	Neil Kirsh	204		
Turnout		1,405		

=== Rayleigh Central ===
Rayleigh Central (2)
Party	Candidate	Votes	%	±%
Conservative	Ronald Choppen	608		
Conservative	Antony Humphries	579		
Liberal Democrats	Nicholas Harris	503		
Liberal Democrats	Peggy Pearse	459		
Turnout		2,149		

=== Rochford ===
Rochford (3)
Party	Candidate	Votes	%	±%
Labour	Maureen Vince	701		
Conservative	Linda Barber	672		
Conservative	Richard Amner	660		
Labour	Kevin Attridge	653		
Labour	John Dickson	594		
Conservative	Sarah Rogers	587		
Turnout		3,867		

=== Sweyne Park ===
Sweyne Park (2)
Party	Candidate	Votes	%	±%
Conservative	Gerald Mockford	351		
Conservative	Peter Savill	337		
Liberal Democrats	Mary Beckers	268		
Liberal Democrats	Paul Beckers	252		
Independent	Derek Trevillion	153		
Turnout		1,361		

=== Trinity ===
Trinity (2)
Party	Candidate	Votes	%	±%
Conservative	Keith Gibbs	unopposed		
Conservative	James Grey	unopposed		

=== Wheatley ===
Wheatley (2)
Party	Candidate	Votes	%	±%
Conservative	John Pullen	unopposed		
Conservative	Mavis Webster	unopposed		

=== Whitehouse ===
Whitehouse (2)
Party	Candidate	Votes	%	±%
Conservative	Peter Webster	596		
Conservative	Simon Smith	577		
Liberal Democrats	Elena Black	479		
Turnout		1,652		
