= 2002 Broxbourne Borough Council election =

2002 UK local government election

Results of the 2002 Broxbourne Borough Council election

The Broxbourne Council election, 2002 was held to elect council members of the Broxbourne Borough Council, the local government authority of the borough of Broxbourne, Hertfordshire, England.

== Composition of expiring seats before election ==
Ward	Party	Incumbent Elected	Incumbent	Standing again?
Broxbourne	Conservative	1999	Joyce Ball	Yes
Bury Green	Conservative	1999	Dennis Clayton	Yes
Cheshunt Central	Conservative	2000	Moyra O'Neill	Yes (Note: Moyra O'Neill stood in Rye Park Ward in 2002 after being previously elected to Cheshunt Central Ward in the November 2000 by-election.)
Cheshunt North	Conservative	1999	Kay Leese	Yes
Flamstead End	Conservative	1999	David Hadley Smith	No
Goffs Oak	Conservative	1999	Elizabeth Clayton	Yes
Hoddesdon North	Conservative	1999	William Cooper	No
Hoddesdon Town	Conservative	2002	Kenneth Ayling	Yes
Rosedale	Conservative	1999	Paul Seeby	Yes (Note: Paul Seeby stood in Flamstead End Ward in 2002.)
Rye Park	Labour	1999	Neil Harvey	No
Theobalds	Conservative	2001	Alan Smith	Yes (Note: Alan Smith stood in Hoddesdon North Ward in 2002 after being originally elected to Theobalds Ward in the November 2001 by-election.)
Waltham Cross	Labour	1999	Linda Dambrauskas	No
Wormley / Turnford	Conservative	1999	Gordon Nicholson	Yes

== Election results ==
Broxbourne local election result 2002
Party	Seats	Gains	Losses	Net gain/loss	Seats %	Votes %	Votes	+/−
Conservative	14	1	1	0	87.50	61.29	10,948	
Labour	1	0	1	-1	6.25	26.23	4,686	
Liberal Democrats	0	0	0	0	0	7.28	1,301	
Independent	1	1	0	+1	6.25	4.24	757	
BNP	0	0	0	0	0	0.96	170	

== Results summary ==
An election was held in all of the 13 wards on 2 May 2002.

16 council seats were involved with 2 seats being voted for in Goffs Oak Ward and 3 seats in Hoddesdon Town Ward.

Martin Greensmyth won the Bury Green Ward for the Independent "Bury Green Residents"

The new political balance of the council following this election was:

- Conservative 35 seats
- Labour 2 seats
- Independent 1 seat

== Ward results ==
Broxbourne Ward Result 2 May 2002
Party	Candidate	Votes	%	±%
Conservative	Joyce Ball	929	64.78	
Liberal Democrats	Kirstie De Rivaz	275	19.18	
Labour	Michael Hanks	230	16.04	
Majority		654		
Turnout		1,434		
Conservative hold		Swing		

Bury Green Ward Result 2 May 2002
Party	Candidate	Votes	%	±%
Independent	Martin Greensmyth	757	46.73	
Conservative	Dennis Clayton	564	34.81	
Labour	Alexander McInnes	299	18.46	
Majority		193		
Turnout		1,620		
Independent gain from Conservative		Swing		

Cheshunt Central Ward Result 2 May 2002
Party	Candidate	Votes	%	±%
Conservative	Keith Brown	975	62.98	
Labour	Ronald McCole	382	24.68	
Liberal Democrats	Michael Gould	191	12.34	
Majority		593		
Turnout		1,548		
Conservative hold		Swing		

Cheshunt North Ward Result 2 May 2002
Party	Candidate	Votes	%	±%
Conservative	Kay Leese	752	56.75	
Labour	Edward Hopwood	403	30.42	
BNP	John Cope	170	12.83	
Majority		349		
Turnout		1,325		
Conservative hold		Swing		

Flamstead End Ward Result 2 May 2002
Party	Candidate	Votes	%	±%
Conservative	Paul Seeby	897	72.69	
Labour	Brian Mercer	337	27.31	
Majority		560		
Turnout		1,234		
Conservative hold		Swing		

Goffs Oak Ward Result 2 Seats 2 May 2002
Party	Candidate	Votes	%	±%
Conservative	Elizabeth Clayton	Unopp.		
Conservative	Russell Thomas	Unopp.		
Conservative hold		Swing		
Majority				
Turnout				

Hoddesdon North Ward Result 2 May 2002
Party	Candidate	Votes	%	±%
Conservative	Alan Smith	1,046	75.63	
Labour	Arthur Hillyard	421	24.37	
Majority		709		
Turnout		1,383		
Conservative hold		Swing		

Hoddesdon Town Ward Result 3 Seats 2 May 2002
Party	Candidate	Votes	%	±%
Conservative	Kenneth Ayling	741	22.05	
Conservative	Robert Bick	713	21.21	
Conservative	Brian Perry	686	20.41	
Liberal Democrats	Anthony Fey	341	10.15	
Labour	Hugh Kelly	335	10.15	
Liberal Democrats	Peter Huse	275	8.18	
Liberal Democrats	Andrew Porrer	264	7.85	
Conservative hold		Swing		

Rosedale Ward Result 2 May 2002
Party	Candidate	Votes	%	±%
Conservative	Raymond Stone	509	68.78	
Labour	Christopher Simonovitch	231	31.22	
Majority		278		
Turnout		740		
Conservative hold		Swing		

Rye Park Ward Result 2 May 2002
Party	Candidate	Votes	%	±%
Conservative	Moyra O'Neill	729	53.10	
Labour	Annette Marples	644	46.90	
Majority		85		
Turnout		1,373		
Conservative gain from Labour		Swing		

Theobalds Ward Result 2 May 2002
Party	Candidate	Votes	%	±%
Conservative	Carol Crump	1,055	70.85	
Labour	Richard Greenhill	434	29.15	
Majority		621		
Turnout		1,489		
Conservative hold		Swing		

Waltham Cross Ward Result 2 May 2002
Party	Candidate	Votes	%	±%
Labour	Malcolm Aitkin	600	53.00	
Conservative	James Burdett	532	47.00	
Majority		68		
Turnout		1,132		
Labour hold		Swing		

Wormley / Turnford Ward Result 2 May 2002
Party	Candidate	Votes	%	±%
Conservative	Gordon Nicholson	820	67.05	
Labour	Sylvia Courtnage	403	32.95	
Majority		417		
Turnout		1,223		
Conservative hold		Swing		
