= 2002 Newcastle-under-Lyme Borough Council election =

2002 UK local government election

Results of the 2002 Newcastle-under-Lyme Borough Council election

Elections to Newcastle-under-Lyme Borough Council were held on 2 May 2002. The whole council was up for election, with boundary changes since the last election in 2000 that increased the number of seats by four. The Labour Party lost overall control of the council to no overall control.

Three seats in Thistleberry ward were vacant until a by-election in June.

== Election result ==
Newcastle-under-Lyme local election result 2002
Party	Seats	Gains	Losses	Net gain/loss	Seats %	Votes %	Votes	+/−
Labour	29			-1	50.9	42.1	27,775	
Liberal Democrats	18			+5	31.6	29.8	19,700	
Conservative	10			+1	17.5	26.9	17,729	
The Caring Party	0			0	0	0.9	606	
Green	0			0	0	0.3	198	
Independent	0			-1	0	0	0	

== Ward results ==
Audley and Bignall End (3)
Party	Candidate	Votes	%	±%
Liberal Democrats	Andrew Wemyss	874		
Liberal Democrats	Catherine Cornes	834		
Labour	Edward Boden	786		
Liberal Democrats	Ian Wilkes	770		
Labour	Dennis McIntosh	641		
Labour	Leonard Gibbs	622		
Conservative	Robert Edwards	328		
Conservative	Kenneth Rushton	193		
Conservative	Vera Rushton	173		
Turnout		5,221		

Bradwell (3)
Party	Candidate	Votes	%	±%
Labour	Trevor Hambleton	749		
Labour	John Tatton	730		
Labour	Tom Meir	697		
Conservative	Michelle Degg	270		
Liberal Democrats	Shirley Coxon	243		
Conservative	Alan Humphreys	234		
Conservative	Gladys Parfitt	205		
Liberal Democrats	Patricia Timmis	152		
Turnout		3,280		

Butt Lane (3)
Party	Candidate	Votes	%	±%
Labour	Mavis Lench	588		
Labour	John Evans	566		
Labour	John Macmillan	551		
Liberal Democrats	Paula Earl	367		
Liberal Democrats	Silvia Burgess	362		
Liberal Democrats	John Parsons	340		
Conservative	Betty Cartwright	136		
Conservative	John Harper	128		
Conservative	Nicola Pattison	120		
Turnout		3,158		

Chesterton (3)
Party	Candidate	Votes	%	±%
Labour	Elizabeth Caddy	635		
Labour	John Billington	612		
Labour	Sheila Phillips	565		
Conservative	Malcolm Moore	234		
Liberal Democrats	Christopher Wain	207		
Conservative	Russell Pattison	191		
Conservative	Price Roberts	182		
Turnout		2,626		

Clayton (2)
Party	Candidate	Votes	%	±%
Labour	Colin Brooks	525		
Conservative	Ann Heames	518		
Labour	Vince Byatt	505		
Conservative	William Heames	466		
Liberal Democrats	Julian Colclough	144		
Liberal Democrats	Marjorie Cookson	139		
Turnout		2,297		

Cross Heath (3)
Party	Candidate	Votes	%	±%
Labour	Gillian Williams	792		
Labour	Sylvia Butler	766		
Labour	John Williams	711		
Liberal Democrats	Jane Finney	394		
Liberal Democrats	Leo Hamburger	254		
Conservative	Mary Cork	199		
Conservative	Luciana Flackett	174		
Conservative	Thomas James	163		
Turnout		3,453		

Halmerend (2)
Party	Candidate	Votes	%	±%
Liberal Democrats	David Becket	614		
Liberal Democrats	Gavin Webb	573		
Conservative	Mark Riley	343		
Labour	Christopher Cooper	327		
Labour	Trevor Sproston	311		
Conservative	Simon Tagg	285		
Turnout		2,453		

Holditch (2)
Party	Candidate	Votes	%	±%
Labour	Betty Blaise	499		
Labour	Vic Finnemore	430		
Liberal Democrats	Jane Wemyss	125		
Conservative	Eleanor Moore	83		
Conservative	Phyllis James	81		
Turnout		1,218		

Keele (2)
Party	Candidate	Votes	%	±%
Liberal Democrats	Robin Studd	445		
Liberal Democrats	Wenslie Naylon	429		
Labour	Theresa James	155		
Labour	Brian O'Rourke	143		
Conservative	Margaret Campbell	89		
Conservative	Judith Flynn	84		
Turnout		1,345		

Kidsgrove (3)
Party	Candidate	Votes	%	±%
Liberal Democrats	Mary Maxfield	752		
Labour	Margaret Astle	698		
Labour	Martin Bentley	596		
Liberal Democrats	Geoffrey Hall	579		
Liberal Democrats	Ephriam Daniels	558		
Labour	Dorothy Fogg	546		
Conservative	Elizabeth Heath	97		
Conservative	Michael James	90		
Conservative	Richard Watts	81		
Turnout		3,997		

Knutton and Silverdale (2)
Party	Candidate	Votes	%	±%
Labour	Maureen Maddox	456		
Labour	David Leech	392		
The Caring Party	Derrick Huckfield	252		
The Caring Party	Stephanie Wilcox	144		
Liberal Democrats	Eric Durber	73		
Conservative	Peter Davies	71		
Conservative	David Heath	56		
Turnout		1,444		

Loggerheads and Whitmore (3)
Party	Candidate	Votes	%	±%
Conservative	Charles Holland	1,166		
Conservative	Freda Myatt	1,078		
Conservative	Colin Ince	1,050		
Liberal Democrats	Anne Becket	292		
Labour	Anne Farrelly	243		
Labour	Doris Boden	209		
Labour	Victor Wilson	178		
Turnout		4,216		

Madeley (2)
Party	Candidate	Votes	%	±%
Labour	Ashley Howells	758		
Labour	William Sinnott	537		
Conservative	Andrew Davies	385		
Liberal Democrats	Bryan Kirkham	369		
Conservative	Ian Matthews	328		
Turnout		2,377		

May Bank (3)
Party	Candidate	Votes	%	±%
Liberal Democrats	Muffi Fox	836		
Liberal Democrats	Edward Coxon	763		
Liberal Democrats	Trevor Johnson	724		
Labour	Michael Clarke	678		
Labour	Margaret McQuillan	483		
Labour	Roy Taylor	458		
Conservative	Peter Dunn	329		
Conservative	Anthony Thornber	261		
Conservative	Marjorie Thornber	232		
Turnout		4,764		

Newchapel (2)
Party	Candidate	Votes	%	±%
Liberal Democrats	Hortense Lowndes	330		
Liberal Democrats	Sandra Bowyer	313		
Labour	Gillian Burnett	270		
Labour	Frank Penell	260		
Conservative	Nora Salt	221		
Conservative	Carl Thomson	196		
Turnout		1,590		

Porthill (2)
Party	Candidate	Votes	%	±%
Labour	Bertram Lawton	394		
Labour	Colin Higginson	390		
Conservative	John Cooper	363		
Conservative	Barbara Lewis	249		
Liberal Democrats	Christopher Dunning	160		
Liberal Democrats	Neil Adams	138		
Turnout		1,694		

Ravenscliffe (2)
Party	Candidate	Votes	%	±%
Liberal Democrats	Brian Lewis	420		
Labour	Raymond Astle	410		
Liberal Democrats	Christine Slater	394		
Labour	Edmund Chrzanowski	379		
Conservative	Edith Greatbach	115		
Conservative	Jacqueline Heath	90		
Turnout		1,808		

Seabridge (3)
Party	Candidate	Votes	%	±%
Conservative	Andrew Fear	713		
Conservative	David Nixon	692		
Conservative	Peter Hailstones	677		
Labour	Richard Gorton	569		
Labour	Cynthia Taylor	485		
Labour	Harry Matthews	468		
Liberal Democrats	Kelly Dale	235		
Liberal Democrats	Craig Ridgway	220		
Liberal Democrats	Hans Liebeck	189		
Turnout		4,248		

Silverdale and Parksite (2)
Party	Candidate	Votes	%	±%
Labour	Elaine Blake	480		
Labour	George Cairns	369		
The Caring Party	George Tweedie	110		
Liberal Democrats	John Naylon	105		
Liberal Democrats	Angela Studd	101		
The Caring Party	Geoffrey Cubley	100		
Conservative	Robert Titterton	100		
Conservative	Sydney Trickett	82		
Turnout		1,447		

Talke (2)
Party	Candidate	Votes	%	±%
Liberal Democrats	Raymond Slater	657		
Liberal Democrats	Arthur Amos	648		
Labour	Lynda Griffiths	358		
Labour	Robina Macmillan	314		
Conservative	Shirley Titterton	75		
Conservative	Pauline Trickett	63		
Turnout		2,115		

Town (2)
Party	Candidate	Votes	%	±%
Labour	Albert Clarke	556		
Liberal Democrats	David Clarke	534		
Liberal Democrats	Christopher Malkin	486		
Labour	Stephen James	427		
Conservative	Winston Cooper	131		
Conservative	Adam Howard	110		
Turnout		2,244		

Westlands (3)
Party	Candidate	Votes	%	±%
Conservative	Glennis Deakin	1,166		
Conservative	Mary Moss	1,122		
Conservative	Michael Flynn	1,034		
Labour	Laura Stoddard	401		
Liberal Democrats	David Dugdale	337		
Labour	Peter Munn	336		
Liberal Democrats	Hilary Jones	331		
Liberal Democrats	Susan Willson	308		
Labour	Ike Williams	300		
Turnout		5,335		

Wolstanton (3)
Party	Candidate	Votes	%	±%
Labour	Michael Foy	580		
Liberal Democrats	Andrew Worsey	549		
Liberal Democrats	Pamela Patten	538		
Liberal Democrats	John Cornes	495		
Labour	Sandra Hambleton	446		
Labour	Sheridon Lamb	445		
Green	Ann Beirne	198		
Conservative	David Cooper	186		
Conservative	John Vernon	124		
Conservative	Christopher Trickett	117		
Turnout		3,678		
