= 2002 Daventry District Council election =

2002 UK local government election

- 2 May 2002

Results of the 2002 Daventry District Council election

Elections to Daventry District Council were held on 2 May 2002. One third of the council was up for election and the Conservative Party stayed in overall control of the council. Overall turnout was 35%.

After the election, the composition of the council was:

- Conservative 26
- Labour 10
- Liberal Democrat 1
- Independent 1

== Election result ==
Daventry local election result 2002
Party	Seats	Gains	Losses	Net gain/loss	Seats %	Votes %	Votes	+/−
Conservative	12	6	0	+6	92.3	59.4	7,741	
Labour	1	0	3	-3	7.7	30.0	3,913	
Liberal Democrats	0	0	2	-2	0	10.6	1,385	
Independent	0	0	1	-1	0	0	0	

== Ward results ==
Abbey North
Party	Candidate	Votes	%	±%
Conservative	Paul Peccioli	695	55.9	
Labour	Gareth Pritchard	549	44.1	
Majority		146	11.8	
Turnout		1,244		
Conservative hold		Swing		

Barby and Kilsby
Party	Candidate	Votes	%	±%
Conservative	Katherine Hemmings	594	45.0	
Liberal Democrats	Catherine Lomax	571	43.3	
Labour	Ann Frost	155	11.7	
Majority		23	1.7	
Turnout		1,320		
Conservative gain from Liberal Democrats		Swing		

Brampton
Party	Candidate	Votes	%	±%
Conservative	Ken Melling	425	79.9	
Labour	Anthony Sparrowhawk	107	20.1	
Majority		318	59.8	
Turnout		532		
Conservative hold		Swing		

Brixworth
Party	Candidate	Votes	%	±%
Conservative	Nicholas Bunting	797	51.2	
Liberal Democrats	Leslie Tyrer	551	35.4	
Labour	Mark Mulcahey	208	13.4	
Majority		246	15.8	
Turnout		1,556		
Conservative hold		Swing		

Byfield
Party	Candidate	Votes	%	±%
Conservative	Gayl Coleridge	526	74.6	
Labour	Gillian Pitt	179	25.4	
Majority		347	49.2	
Turnout		705		
Conservative gain from Independent		Swing		

Drayton
Party	Candidate	Votes	%	±%
Labour	Nigel Carr	499	53.1	
Conservative	Barry Howard	440	46.9	
Majority		59	6.2	
Turnout		939		
Labour hold		Swing		

Hill
Party	Candidate	Votes	%	±%
Conservative	Alan Hills	592	52.2	
Labour	Maureen Luke	543	47.8	
Majority		49	4.4	
Turnout		1,135		
Conservative gain from Labour		Swing		

Long Buckby
Party	Candidate	Votes	%	±%
Conservative	Stephen Osborne	888	60.0	
Labour	Chris Myers	591	40.0	
Majority		297	20.0	
Turnout		1,479		
Conservative gain from Labour		Swing		

Moulton
Party	Candidate	Votes	%	±%
Conservative	Daniel Cribbin	718	59.4	
Liberal Democrats	Edna Tyrer	263	21.8	
Labour	Brian Luck	227	18.8	
Majority		455	37.6	
Turnout		1,208		
Conservative gain from Liberal Democrats		Swing		

Spratton
Party	Candidate	Votes	%	±%
Conservative	Chris Cox	372	57.4	
Labour	Suzanne McDonald-Walker	276	42.6	
Majority		96	14.8	
Turnout		648		
Conservative gain from Labour		Swing		

West Haddon and Guilsborough
Party	Candidate	Votes	%	±%
Conservative	Chris Millar	649	79.8	
Labour	Jane Cartlidge	164	20.2	
Majority		485	59.6	
Turnout		813		
Conservative hold		Swing		

Woodford
Party	Candidate	Votes	%	±%
Conservative	Liz Griffin	521	63.1	
Labour	Christine Fitchett	305	36.9	
Majority		216	26.2	
Turnout		826		
Conservative hold		Swing		

Yelvertoft
Party	Candidate	Votes	%	±%
Conservative	Ida Taylor	524	82.6	
Labour	John Moger	110	17.4	
Majority		414	65.2	
Turnout		634		
Conservative hold		Swing		
