= 2002 Mole Valley District Council election =

2002 UK local government election

Results of the 2002 Mole Valley District Council election

Elections to Mole Valley Council were held on 2 May 2002. One third of the council was up for election and the council stayed under no overall control.

After the election, the composition of the council was:

- Conservative 18
- Liberal Democrat 15
- Independent 7
- Labour 1

== Election result ==
Mole Valley local election result 2002
Party	Seats	Gains	Losses	Net gain/loss	Seats %	Votes %	Votes	+/−
Liberal Democrats	6			+1	42.9	39.2	8,384	
Conservative	5			-1	35.7	42.3	9,060	
Independent	3			0	21.4	10.8	2,306	
Labour	0			0	0	7.3	1,572	
Green	0			0	0	0.4	77	

== Ward results ==
Ashtead Common
Party	Candidate	Votes	%	±%
Independent	John Northcott	756	51.4	
Conservative	Sylvia Sharland	603	41.0	
Labour	John Gough	112	7.6	
Majority		153	10.4	
Turnout		1,471		

Ashtead Park
Party	Candidate	Votes	%	±%
Independent	Peter Smith	740	57.1	
Conservative	Christopher Reynolds	464	35.8	
Labour	Susan Gilchrist	58	4.5	
Green	Anthony Cooper	34	2.6	
Majority		276	21.3	
Turnout		1,296		

Ashtead Village
Party	Candidate	Votes	%	±%
Independent	Michael Williams	810	47.8	
Conservative	Christopher Hunt	575	34.0	
Liberal Democrats	Janet Jones	177	10.5	
Labour	Clive Scott	88	5.2	
Green	Jennifer Huggett	43	2.5	
Majority		235	13.8	
Turnout		1,693		

Bookham North
Party	Candidate	Votes	%	±%
Conservative	Tony Moore	1,111	52.4	
Liberal Democrats	Elizabeth Howarth	939	44.3	
Labour	George Helowicz	70	3.3	
Majority		172	8.1	
Turnout		2,120		

Bookham South
Party	Candidate	Votes	%	±%
Liberal Democrats	Tony Turner	1,149	59.0	
Conservative	Eddie Palmer	710	36.5	
Labour	Ian James	88	4.5	
Majority		439	22.5	
Turnout		1,947		

Brockham, Betchworth and Buckland
Party	Candidate	Votes	%	±%
Liberal Democrats	John Washtell	876	55.8	
Conservative	Anthony Kenney	623	39.7	
Labour	Anne Helowicz	71	4.5	
Majority		253	16.1	
Turnout		1,570		

Capel, Leigh and Newdigate
Party	Candidate	Votes	%	±%
Conservative	Julian Shersby	755	67.7	
Liberal Democrats	John Watson	360	32.3	
Majority		395	45.4	
Turnout		1,115		

Dorking North
Party	Candidate	Votes	%	±%
Liberal Democrats	Derrick Burt	753	54.6	
Conservative	Bridget Upton-Taylor	516	37.4	
Labour	David Christison	111	8.0	
Majority		237	17.2	
Turnout		1,380		

Dorking South
Party	Candidate	Votes	%	±%
Liberal Democrats	Margaret Cooksey	1,197	53.6	
Conservative	Vivienne Michael	863	38.6	
Labour	Philip May	174	7.8	
Majority		334	15.0	
Turnout		2,234		

Fetcham East
Party	Candidate	Votes	%	±%
Conservative	Garth Paterson-Borland	810	67.9	
Liberal Democrats	Andrew Freeman	383	32.1	
Majority		427	35.8	
Turnout		1,193		

Fetcham West
Party	Candidate	Votes	%	±%
Conservative	Timothy Hall	618	57.1	
Liberal Democrats	Humphrey Bowen	394	36.4	
Labour	Gregory Corey	70	6.5	
Majority		224	20.7	
Turnout		1,082		

Holmwoods
Party	Candidate	Votes	%	±%
Liberal Democrats	Caroline Salmon	965	60.2	
Conservative	Michael Foulston	430	26.8	
Labour	Keith Davis	207	12.9	
Majority		535	33.4	
Turnout		1,602		

Leatherhead North
Party	Candidate	Votes	%	±%
Liberal Democrats	Hubert Carr	721	48.8	
Labour	Nicholas Trier	438	29.7	
Conservative	Charlotte Keys	317	21.5	
Majority		283	19.1	
Turnout		1,476		

Leatherhead South
Party	Candidate	Votes	%	±%
Conservative	David Sharland	665	54.5	
Liberal Democrats	Christopher Lloyd	470	38.5	
Labour	Rupert Watts	85	7.0	
Majority		195	16.0	
Turnout		1,220		
