= 2002 Penwith District Council election =

2002 UK local government election

Elections to Penwith District Council were held on 2 May 2002. One third of the council was up for election and the council stayed under no overall control. Overall turnout was 40.3%

After the election, the composition of the council was:

- Independent 11
- Conservative 10
- Liberal Democrat 9
- Labour 3
- Others 1

== Results ==
Penwith local election result 2002
Party	Seats	Gains	Losses	Net gain/loss	Seats %	Votes %	Votes	+/−
Liberal Democrats	6			+2	54.5	37.2	4,539	
Conservative	2			0	18.2	23.9	2,917	
Independent	1			-2	9.1	28.6	3,489	
Labour	1			0	9.1	7.4	897	
Mebyon Kernow	1			0	9.1	2.1	260	
UKIP	0			0	0.0	0.7	91	

One Labour and one Mebyon Kernow candidate were elected unopposed

=== By ward ===
Hayle-Gwithian
Party	Candidate	Votes	%	±%
Liberal Democrats	Terry Lello	946	53.1	
Independent	Jeremy Joslin	837	46.9	
Majority		109	6.2	
Turnout		1,783	37.0	

Lelant and Carbis Bay
Party	Candidate	Votes	%	±%
Conservative	Elizabeth Penhaligon	866	63.6	
Liberal Democrats	Victoria White	271	19.9	
Labour	Terence Murray	225	16.5	
Majority		595	43.7	
Turnout		1,362	41.0	

Ludgvan
Party	Candidate	Votes	%	±%
Independent	Alice Bailey	1,405	85.4	
Independent	Peter Mates	240	14.6	
Majority		1,165	70.8	
Turnout		1,645	39.7	

Penzance Central
Party	Candidate	Votes	%	±%
Mebyon Kernow	Philip Rendle	unopposed		

Penzance East
Party	Candidate	Votes	%	±%
Liberal Democrats	Caroline White	703	46.8	
Labour	Robin Gregory	345	23.0	
Conservative	Pauline Reynolds	220	14.6	
Independent	Ruth Lewarne	138	9.2	
UKIP	Jeffrey Mager	54	3.6	
Independent	Joby Jackson	43	2.9	
Majority		358	23.8	
Turnout		1,503	38.0	

Penzance North
Party	Candidate	Votes	%	±%
Liberal Democrats	Mario Fonk	790	62.7	
Conservative	Godfrey Penhaligon	298	23.7	
Independent	Paul Nicholson	172	13.7	
Majority		492	39.0	
Turnout		1,260	37.8	

Penzance South
Party	Candidate	Votes	%	±%
Labour	Michael Payne	unopposed		

Penzance West
Party	Candidate	Votes	%	±%
Liberal Democrats	Simon Reed	479	38.2	
Independent	Sam Ryan	308	24.6	
Conservative	James Champion	307	24.5	
Independent	Malcolm Lawrence	123	9.8	
UKIP	Michael Faulkner	37	3.0	
Majority		171	13.6	
Turnout		1,254	46.7	

Perranuthnoe
Party	Candidate	Votes	%	±%
Liberal Democrats	Patricia Sanderson	492	56.7	
Conservative	Kenneth Wood	375	43.3	
Majority		117	13.4	
Turnout		867	50.5	

St Ives North
Party	Candidate	Votes	%	±%
Liberal Democrats	Andrew Mitchell	858	82.8	
Conservative	Margaret Milton	178	17.2	
Majority		680	65.6	
Turnout		1,036	35.8	

St Just
Party	Candidate	Votes	%	±%
Conservative	Richard Eddy	673	42.8	
Labour	Cornelius Olivier	327	20.8	
Mebyon Kernow	Andrew Moyle	260	16.5	
Independent	Hilary Eddy	223	14.2	
UKIP	Rose Smith	91	5.8	
Majority		346	22.0	
Turnout		1,574	43.9	
