= 2002 Amber Valley Borough Council election =

2002 UK local government election

Map of the results of the 2002 Amber Valley council election. Labour in red and Conservatives in blue. Wards in grey were not contested in 2002.

Elections to Amber Valley Borough Council were held on 2 May 2002. One third of the council was up for election and the Conservative Party held overall control of the council.

After the election, the composition of the council was:

- Conservative 26
- Labour 19

== Election result ==
Amber Valley local election result 2002
Party	Seats	Gains	Losses	Net gain/loss	Seats %	Votes %	Votes	+/−
Labour	12			+7	75.0	52.5	11,496	
Conservative	4			-6	25.0	37.1	8,115	
Liberal Democrats	0			0	0	5.6	1,217	
Independent	0			-1	0	4.4	955	
Green	0			0	0	0.5	107	

== Ward results ==
Alfreton
Party	Candidate	Votes	%	±%
Labour	John Walker	1,023	63.1	
Independent	Colin Thornton	409	25.2	
Liberal Democrats	Paul Gibbons	188	11.6	
Majority		614	37.9	
Turnout		1,620		
Labour gain from Independent		Swing		

Belper East
Party	Candidate	Votes	%	±%
Conservative	Martin Tomlinson	506	46.6	
Labour	Nalda Boyes-Jackson	473	43.6	
Green	Hugh Stewart	107	9.9	
Majority		33	3.0	
Turnout		1,086		
Conservative hold		Swing		

Belper South
Party	Candidate	Votes	%	±%
Conservative	James Anderson	580	50.04	
Labour	Peter Shepherd	579	49.96	
Majority		1	0.08	
Turnout		1,159		
Conservative hold		Swing		

Codnor and Waingroves
Party	Candidate	Votes	%	±%
Labour	Ian Fisher	871	66.9	
Conservative	David Cattermole	430	33.1	
Majority		441	33.8	
Turnout		1,301		
Labour gain from Conservative		Swing		

Duffield
Party	Candidate	Votes	%	±%
Conservative	Chris Short	865	60.1	
Labour	Patrick Mountain	574	39.9	
Majority		391	20.2	
Turnout		1,439		
Conservative hold		Swing		

Heanor and Loscoe
Party	Candidate	Votes	%	±%
Labour	Bob Moon	725	65.8	
Conservative	Christopher Jubb	376	34.2	
Majority		349	31.6	
Turnout		1,101		
Labour hold		Swing		

Heanor East
Party	Candidate	Votes	%	±%
Labour	Glynne Cato	548	53.8	
Conservative	Enid Trusswell	272	26.7	
Independent	Alex Stevenson	129	12.7	
Liberal Democrats	Keith Falconbridge	70	6.9	
Majority		276	27.1	
Turnout		1,019		
Labour hold		Swing		

Heanor West
Party	Candidate	Votes	%	±%
Labour	Paul Jones	601	47.1	
Liberal	Judith Wooley	413	32.3	
Conservative	Ruth Bulkeley-Kirkham	263	20.6	
Majority		188	14.8	
Turnout		1,277		
Labour hold		Swing		

Ironville and Riddings
Party	Candidate	Votes	%	±%
Labour	David Griffiths	778	58.1	
Conservative	George Cope	560	41.9	
Majority		218	16.2	
Turnout		1,338		
Labour gain from Conservative		Swing		

Kilburn, Denby and Holbrook
Party	Candidate	Votes	%	±%
Labour	John Grace	862	44.3	
Conservative	Alan Warner	808	41.6	
Liberal Democrats	Jeremy Benson	274	14.1	
Majority		54	2.7	
Turnout		1,944		
Labour gain from Conservative		Swing		

Langley Mill and Aldercar
Party	Candidate	Votes	%	±%
Labour	Jo Ward	504	59.2	
Conservative	Ann Castledine	200	23.5	
Independent	Denis Woolley	148	17.4	
Majority		304	35.7	
Turnout		852		
Labour hold		Swing		

Ripley (2)
Party	Candidate	Votes	%	±%
Labour	Charles Cutting	902		
Labour	Geoffrey Carlile	833		
Conservative	Kathleen Brown	812		
Conservative	Peter Clay	736		
Liberal Democrats	Kate Smith	272		
Turnout		3,555		
Labour gain from Conservative		Swing		
Labour gain from Conservative		Swing		

Shipley Park, Horsley and Horsley Woodhouse
Party	Candidate	Votes	%	±%
Labour	Eric Lancashire	771	46.9	
Conservative	Linda Edward-Milson	603	36.7	
Independent	Margaret Jackson	269	16.4	
Majority		168	10.2	
Turnout		1,643		
Labour gain from Conservative		Swing		

Somercotes
Party	Candidate	Votes	%	±%
Labour	Alan Stringer	965	75.9	
Conservative	Geoffrey Brailsford	307	24.1	
Majority		658	51.8	
Turnout		1,272		
Labour hold		Swing		

Swanwick
Party	Candidate	Votes	%	±%
Conservative	Allen King	797	62.1	
Labour	Jonathan Harris	487	37.9	
Majority		310	24.2	
Turnout		1,284		
Conservative hold		Swing		
