= 2002 Knowsley Metropolitan Borough Council election =

2002 UK local government election

Elections to Knowsley Metropolitan Borough Council were held on 2 May 2002. One third of the council was up for election and the Labour Party kept overall control of the council. Overall turnout was 23.7%.

After the election, the composition of the council was:

- Labour 59
- Liberal Democrat 7

== Election results ==
Knowsley local election result 2002
Party	Seats	Gains	Losses	Net gain/loss	Seats %	Votes %	Votes	+/−
Labour	19			-3	86.4	60.9	15,969	+0.6
Liberal Democrats	3			+3	13.6	21.6	5,665	-2.6
Conservative	0			0	0.0	7.5	1,968	-3.8
Independent	0			0	0.0	5.1	1,347	+1.5
Kirkby Labour Alliance Party	0			0	0.0	3.7	957	+3.7
Socialist Labour	0			0	0.0	0.8	203	+0.3
Green	0			0	0.0	0.4	93	+0.4

== Ward results ==
Cantril Farm
Party	Candidate	Votes	%	±%
Labour	William Welightman	454	61.1	+6.7
Independent	Ian Williams	268	36.1	−5.1
Conservative	Delyth Arnall	21	2.8	−1.6
Majority		186	25.0	+11.8
Turnout		743	20.9	+6.9

Cherryfield
Party	Candidate	Votes	%	±%
Labour	Jayne Aston	604	71.7	+3.9
Independent	Norman Harris	192	22.8	−1.7
Conservative	Charles Brent	46	5.5	−2.3
Majority		397	48.6	+5.3
Turnout		842	19.6	+4.3

Halewood East
Party	Candidate	Votes	%	±%
Liberal Democrats	Sarah Smithson	1,096	54.4	−11.5
Labour	Lindsey Moorhead-Taylor	775	38.5	+12.6
Conservative	Gillian Robertson	143	7.1	−1.0
Majority		421	15.9	−24.1
Turnout		2,014	25.7	+2.0

Halewood South
Party	Candidate	Votes	%	±%
Labour	Andrew Moorhead	552	64.3	−3.5
Liberal Democrats	Sharon Fricker	181	21.1	−11.1
Socialist Labour	Stephen Whatham	125	14.6	+14.6
Majority		371	43.2	+7.6
Turnout		858	20.1	+3.5

Halewood West
Party	Candidate	Votes	%	±%
Labour	Robert Swann	633	63.9	−3.3
Liberal Democrats	Shelly Powell	193	19.5	−13.3
Independent	Frederick Gibb	113	11.4	+11.4
Socialist Labour	Eric McIntosh	51	5.2	+5.2
Majority		440	44.4	+10.4
Turnout		990	22.7	+7.2

Kirkby Central
Party	Candidate	Votes	%	±%
Labour	Jacqueline Harris	841	92.2	+1.3
Conservative	Douglas Christie	71	7.8	−1.3
Majority		770	84.4	+2.6
Turnout		912	19.8	+5.6

Knowsley Park
Party	Candidate	Votes	%	±%
Labour	Patrica Devlin	658	57.3	+1.3
Conservative	Robert Arnall	403	35.1	−8.9
Liberal Democrats	John Nield	87	7.6	+7.6
Majority		255	22.2	+10.2
Turnout		1,148	22.8	+5.3

Longview
Party	Candidate	Votes	%	±%
Labour	Michael Kearns	627	85.7	+28.4
Liberal Democrats	Alan Davis	105	14.3	−21.0
Majority		522	71.4	+49.4
Turnout		732	18.2	+2.5

Northwood
Party	Candidate	Votes	%	±%
Labour	Edward Connor	606	70.5	−19.7
Kirkby Labour Alliance Party	George Rowe	209	24.3	+24.3
Conservative	Thomas Fagan	45	5.2	−4.6
Majority		397	46.2	−34.2
Turnout		860	24.6	+8.2

Page Moss
Party	Candidate	Votes	%	±%
Labour	Arthur Murphy	720	56.1	−13.9
Independent	Edward Robb	407	31.7	+31.7
Liberal Democrats	Kathleen Lappin	129	10.1	−8.1
Socialist Labour	Carole Whatham	27	2.1	−9.7
Majority		313	24.4	−27.4
Turnout		1,283	24.4	+10.0

Park
Party	Candidate	Votes	%	±%
Labour	David Lonergan	979	63.0	+3.2
Kirkby Labour Alliance Party	Peter Fisher	375	24.1	+24.1
Conservative	Geoffrey Allen	106	6.8	−4.1
Green	James Oakley	93	6.0	+6.0
Majority		604	38.9	+8.4
Turnout		1,553	26.7	+8.9

Prescot East
Party	Candidate	Votes	%	±%
Liberal Democrats	Jean Waring	786	61.6	−0.5
Labour	Jacqueline Friar	489	38.4	+0.5
Majority		297	23.2	−1.0
Turnout		1,275	28.4	+6.7

Prescot West
Party	Candidate	Votes	%	±%
Liberal Democrats	Denis Rimmer	784	55.8	−6.2
Labour	George Hayward	531	37.8	−0.2
Conservative	Sylvia Christie	91	6.5	+6.5
Majority		253	18.0	−6.0
Turnout		1,406	28.5	−3.3

Princess
Party	Candidate	Votes	%	±%
Labour	Thomas Quirk	605	88.2	+8.1
Liberal Democrats	June Porter	81	11.8	−8.1
Majority		524	76.4	+16.2
Turnout		686	17.1	+3.4

Roby
Party	Candidate	Votes	%	±%
Labour	Joan Quilliam	1,142	54.9	+9.7
Conservative	Gary Robertson	691	33.2	−7.5
Liberal Democrats	Cecilia Saleemi	249	12.0	−1.5
Majority		451	21.7	+17.2
Turnout		2,082	29.4	+5.0

St Gabriels
Party	Candidate	Votes	%	±%
Labour	Joanne Hedges	700	53.3	−2.2
Liberal Democrats	Frederick Fricker	573	43.6	+6.9
Conservative	Ronald Robinson	41	3.1	−4.8
Majority		127	9.7	−9.1
Turnout		1,314	29.1	+9.7

St Michaels
Party	Candidate	Votes	%	±%
Labour	John Keith	775	78.2	−1.7
Liberal Democrats	Jean Rimmer	216	21.8	+1.7
Majority		559	56.4	−3.4
Turnout		991	23.1	+6.4

Swanside
Party	Candidate	Votes	%	±%
Labour	Graham Wright	1,105	72.3	+1.6
Liberal Democrats	John Waring	227	14.8	+1.1
Conservative	Thomas Lee	197	12.9	−2.8
Majority		878	57.5	+2.5
Turnout		1,529	25.5	+5.2

Tower Hill
Party	Candidate	Votes	%	±%
Labour	Thomas Grierson	649	58.8	−29.7
Independent	John Bennett	208	18.9	+18.9
Kirkby Labour Alliance Party	Michael Scully	200	18.1	+18.1
Conservative	Gillian Allen	46	4.2	−7.3
Majority		441	39.9	−37.1
Turnout		1,103	17.7	+7.0

Whiston North
Party	Candidate	Votes	%	±%
Labour	Ronald Gaffney	674	51.5	−19.0
Liberal Democrats	Marjorie Sommerfield	635	48.5	+19.0
Majority		39	3.0	−38.0
Turnout		1,309	22.7	+6.8

Whiston South
Party	Candidate	Votes	%	±%
Labour	Vincent Cullen	927	65.8	−2.9
Liberal Democrats	Joan McGarry	323	22.9	+10.7
Independent	Mark Salmon	159	11.3	+11.3
Majority		604	42.9	−6.8
Turnout		1,409	23.9	+4.9

Whitefield
Party	Candidate	Votes	%	±%
Labour	Doris Keats	923	79.4	−8.9
Kirkby Labour Alliance Party	John Gallagher	173	14.9	+14.9
Conservative	Lorna Gough	67	5.8	−5.9
Majority		750	64.5	−12.1
Turnout		1,163	21.3	+7.5
