= 2002 Walsall Metropolitan Borough Council election =

2002 UK local government election

	Majority party	Minority party	Third party
Party	Labour	Conservative	Liberal Democrats
Last election	27 seats	25 seats	7 seats
Seats before	27	25	7
Seats won	12	6	2
Seats after	28	24	7
Seat change	▲1	▼1	Steady
Popular vote	21,734	22,439	5,137
Percentage	39.9%	41.2%	9.4%

The 2002 Walsall Metropolitan Borough Council election took place on 2 May 2002 to elect members of Walsall Metropolitan Borough Council in the West Midlands, England. One third of the council was up for election and the council stayed under no overall control.

== Background ==
Before the election the council was run by a coalition between the Conservative and Liberal Democrat parties, after Labour had run the council from 1995 to 2000. The candidates at the election were 20 each from the Labour and Conservative parties, 10 Liberal Democrats, 7 independents, 4 UK Independence Party and 3 Green Party.

A significant issue at the election was a report from the Audit Commission in January 2002, which had made many criticisms of the council, with the council having almost been taken over by the national government 2 months before the election.

== Election result ==
Walsall local election result 2002
Party	Seats	Gains	Losses	Net gain/loss	Seats %	Votes %	Votes	+/−
Labour	12			+1	60.0	39.9	21,734	
Conservative	6			-1	30.0	41.2	22,439	
Liberal Democrats	2			0	10.0	9.4	5,137	
Independent	0			0	0	5.1	2,758	
Socialist Alliance	0			0	0	2.0	1,086	
UKIP	0			0	0	1.5	841	
Green	0			0	0	0.8	460	

== Ward results ==
Aldridge Central and South
Party	Candidate	Votes	%	±%
Conservative	John O'Hare	2,020	58.0	
Labour	Carol Rose	649	18.6	
Liberal Democrats	Josephine Levine	474	13.6	
Independent	David Boulton	340	9.8	
Majority		1,371	39.4	
Turnout		3,483	35.6	

Aldridge North and Walsall Wood
Party	Candidate	Votes	%	±%
Conservative	Keith Sears	1,789	63.7	
Labour	Violet Upton	1,020	36.3	
Majority		769	27.4	
Turnout		2,809	27.8	

Bentley and Darlaston North
Party	Candidate	Votes	%	±%
Labour	Ayshea Johnson	1,431	63.5	
Conservative	Doris Silvester	821	36.5	
Majority		610	27.1	
Turnout		2,252	23.3	

Birchills-Leamore
Party	Candidate	Votes	%	±%
Labour	Joan Barton	1,417	61.8	
Conservative	Mohammed Arshad	763	33.3	
Socialist Alliance	Azra Jabbar	113	4.9	
Majority		654	28.5	
Turnout		2,293	24.0	

Blakenall
Party	Candidate	Votes	%	±%
Labour	Robert Robinson	903	59.3	
Conservative	Alan Venables	303	19.9	
Socialist Alliance	Peter Smith	135	8.9	
Independent	Michael Taylor	106	7.0	
Liberal Democrats	Wendy Evans	77	5.1	
Majority		600	39.4	
Turnout		1,524	19.8	

Bloxwich East
Party	Candidate	Votes	%	±%
Labour	Kathleen Phillips	1,169	48.3	
Conservative	Anthony Harris	840	34.7	
Independent	Annette Taylor	307	12.7	
Liberal Democrats	Amina Walters	103	4.3	
Majority		329	13.6	
Turnout		2,419	29.3	

Bloxwich West
Party	Candidate	Votes	%	±%
Labour	George Worley	1,167	46.4	
Conservative	Desmond Pitt	975	38.8	
Independent	Kerrie Pitt	191	7.6	
Liberal Democrats	Peter Hughes	183	7.3	
Majority		192	7.6	
Turnout		2,516	27.7	

Brownhills
Party	Candidate	Votes	%	±%
Labour	John Bird	1,253	53.3	
Conservative	Robert Culbert	1,097	46.7	
Majority		156	6.6	
Turnout		2,350	24.9	

Darlaston South
Party	Candidate	Votes	%	±%
Labour	Graham Wilkes	1,302	70.2	
Conservative	Rose Martin	553	29.8	
Majority		749	40.4	
Turnout		1,855	21.6	

Hatherton and Rushall
Party	Candidate	Votes	%	±%
Conservative	Arthur Clarke	1,545	51.6	
Labour	Ann Wilson	1,062	35.5	
Green	Richard Clarke	239	8.0	
UKIP	Jenny Mayo	147	4.9	
Majority		483	16.1	
Turnout		2,993	29.4	

Paddock
Party	Candidate	Votes	%	±%
Conservative	Barry Sanders	1,860	44.0	
Independent	Cecil Wood	896	21.2	
Labour	Robert Matthews	877	20.7	
Liberal Democrats	Daniel Barker	465	11.0	
Green	Robert Walter	133	3.1	
Majority		964	22.9	
Turnout		4,231	39.4	

Palfrey
Party	Candidate	Votes	%	±%
Labour	Waheed Saleem	1,657	45.6	
Conservative	Mohammed Arif	1,191	32.8	
Socialist Alliance	Cyril Leaker	782	21.5	
Majority		466	12.8	
Turnout		3,630	37.2	

Pelsall
Party	Candidate	Votes	%	±%
Conservative	Garry Perry	2,516	60.1	
Liberal Democrats	Linda Dickens	830	19.8	
Labour	Paul Higgens	736	17.6	
UKIP	Anthony Lenton	106	2.5	
Majority		1,686	40.3	
Turnout		4,188	36.8	

Pheasey
Party	Candidate	Votes	%	±%
Labour	Martin Harrower	1,021	39.8	
Conservative	Christopher Towe	912	35.6	
Independent	Edmund Newman	632	24.6	
Majority		109	4.2	
Turnout		2,565	36.0	

Pleck
Party	Candidate	Votes	%	±%
Labour	Norman Matthews	1,356	61.4	
Conservative	Mark Dabbs	568	25.7	
Independent	Peter Ruston	286	12.9	
Majority		788	35.7	
Turnout		2,210	29.6	

Short Heath
Party	Candidate	Votes	%	±%
Liberal Democrats	Eileen Pitt	1,158	53.4	
Labour	Gareth Walker	626	28.9	
Conservative	Cerwyn Edwards	383	17.7	
Majority		532	24.6	
Turnout		2,167	24.0	

St. Matthews
Party	Candidate	Votes	%	±%
Labour	Richard Worrall	1,484	49.1	
Conservative	Wahid Ali	1,054	34.9	
Liberal Democrats	Martin Barker	207	6.8	
UKIP	Derek Bennett	133	4.4	
Green	Gerard Hawley	88	2.9	
Socialist Alliance	Stephanie Peart	56	1.9	
Majority		430	14.2	
Turnout		3,022	37.0	

Streetly
Party	Candidate	Votes	%	±%
Conservative	Michael Bird	2,301	65.1	
Labour	Thomas Charlton	777	22.0	
UKIP	Stephen Grey	455	12.9	
Majority		1,524	43.1	
Turnout		3,533	32.9	

Willenhall North
Party	Candidate	Votes	%	±%
Liberal Democrats	Arthur Bentley	1,225	56.8	
Labour	Carol Creaney	589	27.3	
Conservative	Susan Turner	343	15.9	
Majority		636	29.5	
Turnout		2,157	22.8	

Willenhall South
Party	Candidate	Votes	%	±%
Labour	Harold Withnall	1,238	54.8	
Conservative	Steven Turner	605	26.8	
Liberal Democrats	Anne Willoughby	415	18.4	
Majority		633	28.0	
Turnout		2,258	23.0	
