= 2002 Purbeck District Council election =

2002 UK local government election

Results of the 2002 Purbeck District Council election

Elections to Purbeck District Council were held on 2 May 2002. One third of the council was up for election and the Conservative Party stayed in overall control of the council.

After the election, the composition of the council was

- Conservative 16
- Independent 4
- Liberal Democrat 4

== Election result ==
Purbeck local election result 2002
Party	Seats	Gains	Losses	Net gain/loss	Seats %	Votes %	Votes	+/−
Conservative	4			0	50.0	30.5	2,344	
Independent	3			0	37.5	21.2	1,627	
Liberal Democrats	1			0	12.5	35.9	2,757	
Labour	0			0	0	12.5	962	

One Independent candidate was unopposed.

== Ward results ==
Bere Regis
Party	Candidate	Votes	%	±%
Independent	Peter Wharf	unopposed		

Creech Barrow
Party	Candidate	Votes	%	±%
Conservative	Nicholas Cake	329	51.2	
Liberal Democrats	Mark Howlett	200	31.1	
Labour	Robert Huskinson	114	17.7	
Majority		129	20.1	
Turnout		643		

Langton
Party	Candidate	Votes	%	±%
Conservative	Michael Lovell	393	53.1	
Liberal Democrats	William Wilson	304	41.1	
Labour	Leigh van de Zande	43	5.8	
Majority		89	12.0	
Turnout		740		

Lytchett Matravers
Party	Candidate	Votes	%	±%
Independent	Angus McDonald	652	53.1	
Liberal Democrats	Royston Fox	575	46.9	
Majority		77	6.2	
Turnout		1,227		

Purbeck West
Party	Candidate	Votes	%	±%
Independent	Elizabeth Rudd	279	69.9	
Labour	Jon Davey	120	30.1	
Majority		159	39.8	
Turnout		399		

Swanage South
Party	Candidate	Votes	%	±%
Conservative	Gary Suttle	717	42.5	
Labour	Cherry Bartlett	566	33.5	
Liberal Democrats	Hilary O'Donocan	406	24.0	
Majority		151	9.0	
Turnout		1,689		

Wareham
Party	Candidate	Votes	%	±%
Liberal Democrats	David Budd	1,003	42.5	
Independent	Leslie Burns	696	29.5	
Conservative	Jane Patterson	544	23.0	
Labour	Audrey Tighe	119	5.0	
Majority		307	13.0	
Turnout		2,362		

Winfrith
Party	Candidate	Votes	%	±%
Conservative	Keith Barnes	361	57.3	
Liberal Democrats	Eric Osmond	269	42.7	
Majority		92	14.6	
Turnout		630		
