= 2002 Wolverhampton City Council election =

2002 UK local government election

2002 Wolverhampton City Council elections were held on 2 May 2002.

The Labour Party kept overall control of the Council following the election.

== Ward results ==
Bilston East
Party	Candidate	Votes	%	±%
Labour	Stephen Simkins	1328	66.27	
Conservative	Peter Dobb	431	21.51	
Liberal Democrats	Michael Birch	237	11.03	
Majority		897	44.76	
Turnout		2,004	24.11	

Bilston North
Party	Candidate	Votes	%	±%
Labour	Trudy Bowen	1516	56.25	
Conservative	Martyn Griffiths	935	34.69	
Liberal Democrats	Frances Heap	238	8.83	
Majority		581	21.56	
Turnout		2,695	25.65	

Blakenhall
Party	Candidate	Votes	%	±%
Labour	John Rowley	2430	78.11	
Conservative	Alexandra Ward	446	14.34	
Liberal Democrats	Jonathan Norden	218	7.00	
Majority		1984	63.77	
Turnout		3,111	35.09	

Bushbury
Party	Candidate	Votes	%	±%
Labour	Paul Allen	1313	46.58	
Conservative	Charles Brueton	1115	39.55	
Liberal Democrats	John Steatham	299	10.61	
Green	Christopher Hickman	90	3.20	
Majority		198	7.02	
Turnout		2,819	32.68	

East Park
Party	Candidate	Votes	%	±%
Labour	Keith Inston	1398	68.73	
Conservative	Paulene Griffiths	396	19.47	
Liberal Democrats	Ann Whitehouse	221	10.87	
Majority		1002	49.26	
Turnout		2,034	26.93	

Ettingshall
Party	Candidate	Votes	%	±%
Labour	John Shelley	1450	72.18	
Conservative	John Corns	315	15.68	
Liberal Democrats	Eileen Birch	233	11.60	
Majority		1135	56.50	
Turnout		2,009	23.75	

Fallings Park
Party	Candidate	Votes	%	±%
Labour	Joyce Hill	1514	55.64	
Conservative	Marlene Berry	851	31.28	
Liberal Democrats	David Jack	350	12.86	
Majority		663	24.37	
Turnout		2,721	33.49	

Graiseley
Party	Candidate	Votes	%	±%
Labour	John Reynolds	1921	57.50	
Conservative	Harjinder Sangha	956	28.61	
Liberal Democrats	Mary Millar	233	9.13	
Green	Damaris Holley-Hime	149	4.46	
Majority		965	28.88	
Turnout		3,341	36.87	

Heath Town
Party	Candidate	Votes	%	±%
Labour	Caroline Siarkiewicz	990	50.74	
Liberal	Colin Hallmark	482	24.71	
Conservative	Morriss Berry	363	18.61	
Liberal Democrats	Michael Ewing	107	5.48	
Majority		508	26.04	
Turnout		1,951	24.41	

Low Hill
Party	Candidate	Votes	%	±%
Labour	Peter Bilson	1228	71.27	
Conservative	Leon Tanski	308	17.86	
Liberal Democrats	Keith Gliwitzki	174	10.10	
Majority		920	53.40	
Turnout		1,723	20.17	

Merry Hill
Party	Candidate	Votes	%	±%
Conservative	Robert Hart	1824	54.71	
Labour	Philip Page	1155	34.64	
Liberal Democrats	Jessica Pringle	348	10.44	
Majority		669	20.07	
Turnout		3,334	35.17	

Oxley
Party	Candidate	Votes	%	±%
Labour	Christine Irvine	1596	53.76	
Conservative	Brian Bromley	894	30.11	
Liberal Democrats	Ian Jenkins	472	15.90	
Majority		702	23.64	
Turnout		2,969	31.40	

Park
Party	Candidate	Votes	%	±%
Conservative	Neville Patten	1737	42.59	
Labour	Sandra Samuels	1673	41.03	
Liberal Democrats	Bryan Lewis	384	9.41	
Green	Rachel Shanks	273	6.69	
Majority		64	1.57	
Turnout		4,078	40.15	

Penn
Party	Candidate	Votes	%	±%
Conservative	Patricia Patten	2072	52.23	
Labour	David Hampton	1362	34.33	
Liberal Democrats	June Hemsley	375	9.45	
Green	David Hawkins	152	3.83	
Majority		710	17.90	
Turnout		3,967	40.16	

St Peter's
Party	Candidate	Votes	%	±%
Labour	Tersaim Singh	1801	63.80	
Liberal Democrats	Paul Hodson	663	23.49	
Conservative	Christopher Haynes	346	12.26	
Majority		1138	40.31	
Turnout		2,823	27.73	

Spring Vale
Party	Candidate	Votes	%	±%
Liberal Democrats	Malcolm Gwinnett	1956	57.99	
Labour	John Thomas	1130	33.50	
Conservative	Arthur Mills	282	8.36	
Majority		826	24.49	
Turnout		3,373	33.89	

Tettenhall Regis
Party	Candidate	Votes	%	±%
Conservative	Robert Ward	1844	62.26	
Labour	Michael Stafford Good	705	23.80	
Liberal Democrats	Roger Gray	406	13.71	
Majority		1139	38.45	
Turnout		2,962	32.36	

Tettenhall Wightwick
Party	Candidate	Votes	%	±%
Conservative	Wendy Thompson	2579	71.98	
Labour	Kevin Stelfox	676	18.87	
Liberal Democrats	Philip Bennett	324	9.04	
Majority		1903	53.11	
Turnout		3,583	39.83	

Wednesfield North
Party	Candidate	Votes	%	±%
Labour	Philip Bateman	1713	56.52	
Conservative	Fiona Latter	1030	33.98	
Liberal Democrats	Andrew Dawson	282	9.30	
Majority		683	22.53	
Turnout		3,031	34.56	

Wednesfield South
Party	Candidate	Votes	%	±%
Labour	Helen King	1642	54.40	
Conservative	Peter Knight	1113	36.93	
Liberal Democrats	Carole Jenkins	252	8.36	
Majority		529	17.56	
Turnout		3,013	34.36	
