= 2002 Salford City Council election =

2002 UK local government election

Elections to Salford Council were held on 2 May 2002. One third of the council was up for election. The Labour Party kept overall control of the council. Overall turnout was 25.07%.

After the election, the composition of the council was:

- Labour 52
- Liberal Democrat 6
- Conservative 2

== Election result ==
Salford local election result 2002
Party	Seats	Gains	Losses	Net gain/loss	Seats %	Votes %	Votes	+/−
Labour	18	1	1	0	90.0	52.9	21,254	+9.0%
Liberal Democrats	2	1	0	+1	10.0	25.5	10,247	+1.0%
Conservative	0	0	1	-1	0	17.8	7,162	-9.9%
Liberal	0	0	0	0	0	1.6	645	-0.2%
Independent	0	0	0	0	0	1.5	596	+1.1%
Green	0	0	0	0	0	0.4	141	+0.4%
Socialist Alliance	0	0	0	0	0	0.3	119	+0.3%

== Ward results ==
Barton
Party	Candidate	Votes	%	±%
Labour	David Jolley	1,097	66.1	+10.6
Liberal Democrats	Ian Mathieson	308	18.6	−1.8
Conservative	Leslie Taylor	255	15.4	−8.6
Majority		789	47.5	+16.0
Turnout		1,660	22.1	+3.7
Labour hold		Swing		

Blackfriars
Party	Candidate	Votes	%	±%
Labour	Joseph Murphy	840	73.6	+14.1
Liberal Democrats	Gary Riding	209	18.3	−22.2
Liberal	Paul Rigby	92	8.1	+8.1
Majority		631	55.3	+34.3
Turnout		1,141	19.9	+6.5
Labour hold		Swing		

Broughton
Party	Candidate	Votes	%	±%
Labour	John Merry	963	70.7	−2.5
Independent	Sydney Hastings	222	16.3	+16.3
Liberal Democrats	Jatinder Seehra	177	13.0	−13.8
Majority		739	54.4	+8.0
Turnout		1,362	24.0	+4.9
Labour hold		Swing		

Cadishead
Party	Candidate	Votes	%	±%
Labour	Keith Mann	938	50.2	
Conservative	Thomas Holt	603	32.3	
Liberal Democrats	John Wenham	163	8.7	
Independent	Neil Taylor	163	8.7	
Majority		335	17.9	
Turnout		1,867	28.7	+5.5
Labour gain from Conservative		Swing		

Claremont
Party	Candidate	Votes	%	±%
Liberal Democrats	Timothy Perkins	1,531	56.4	+7.7
Labour	Peter Wheeler	1,185	43.6	+15.1
Majority		346	12.8	−7.4
Turnout		2,716	28.1	+2.4
Liberal Democrats gain from Labour		Swing		

Eccles
Party	Candidate	Votes	%	±%
Labour	Alan Broughton	1,395	56.1	+10.5
Conservative	Michael Edwards	619	24.9	−10.6
Liberal Democrats	Christine Lomax	473	19.0	+0.1
Majority		776	31.2	+21.1
Turnout		2,487	27.7	+3.2
Labour hold		Swing		

Irlam
Party	Candidate	Votes	%	±%
Labour	Joseph Kean	922	49.5	−0.6
Conservative	Elizabeth Hill	596	32.0	−4.7
Independent	Nicholas Wood	182	9.8	+9.8
Liberal Democrats	Julie Wenham	164	8.8	−4.4
Majority		326	17.5	+4.1
Turnout		1,864	25.4	+3.2
Labour hold		Swing		

Kersal
Party	Candidate	Votes	%	±%
Labour	Peter Connor	1,576	73.2	+16.3
Liberal Democrats	Susan Carson	578	26.8	+12.5
Majority		998	46.4	+12.7
Turnout		2,154	25.3	+7.2
Labour hold		Swing		

Langworthy
Party	Candidate	Votes	%	±%
Labour	Andrew Salmon	545	48.4	+6.1
Liberal	Christopher Barnes	290	25.7	−7.8
Liberal Democrats	Jeffrey Flint	257	22.8	−1.4
Socialist Alliance	Peter Hayes	35	3.1	+3.1
Majority		255	22.7	+13.9
Turnout		1,127	21.1	+4.2
Labour hold		Swing		

Little Hulton
Party	Candidate	Votes	%	±%
Labour	Doris Fernandez	885	66.2	+1.1
Liberal Democrats	Jean Blainey	230	17.2	+2.6
Conservative	Walter Edwards	222	16.6	−3.7
Majority		655	49.0	+4.2
Turnout		1,337	19.1	+3.8
Labour hold		Swing		

Ordsall
Party	Candidate	Votes	%	±%
Labour	Susan Slater	520	60.0	+6.7
Liberal Democrats	Ann Gibbons	257	29.7	+20.3
Liberal	Philippa Hanley	60	6.9	−1.4
Independent	Sheilah Wallace	29	3.3	+3.3
Majority		263	30.3	+6.0
Turnout		866	17.4	+2.0
Labour hold		Swing		

Pendlebury
Party	Candidate	Votes	%	±%
Labour	Barry Warner	1,589	63.3	+12.8
Liberal Democrats	James Gregory	471	18.8	−4.0
Conservative	Marjorie Weston	449	17.9	−8.8
Majority		1,118	44.5	+20.7
Turnout		2,509	24.4	+5.2
Labour hold		Swing		

Pendleton
Party	Candidate	Votes	%	±%
Labour	James Hulmes	916	68.6	+12.1
Liberal Democrats	Lynn Drake	335	25.1	+11.9
Socialist Alliance	James Knowles	84	6.3	+6.3
Majority		581	43.5	+4.3
Turnout		1,335	20.3	+3.2
Labour hold		Swing		

Swinton North
Party	Candidate	Votes	%	±%
Labour	Derek Antrobus	1,298	58.5	+9.7
Liberal Democrats	Valerie Gregory	477	21.5	−0.4
Conservative	Wendy Powell	445	20.0	−9.4
Majority		821	37.0	+17.6
Turnout		2,220	24.9	+4.0
Labour hold		Swing		

Swinton South
Party	Candidate	Votes	%	±%
Labour	John Cullen	1,216	45.3	+8.4
Conservative	Peter Allcock	912	34.0	−8.7
Liberal Democrats	Paul Gregory	555	20.7	+0.3
Majority		304	11.3	+5.5
Turnout		2,683	27.5	+4.2
Labour hold		Swing		

Walkden North
Party	Candidate	Votes	%	±%
Labour	William Pennington	1,251	70.6	+19.3
Conservative	Declan Harrington	261	14.7	−1.5
Liberal Democrats	Pauline Ogden	260	14.7	+6.1
Majority		990	55.9	+28.5
Turnout		1,772	21.9	+1.4
Labour hold		Swing		

Walkden South
Party	Candidate	Votes	%	±%
Labour	Valerie Burgoyne	1,341	45.2	+5.2
Conservative	John Mosley	961	32.4	−0.5
Liberal Democrats	Peter Brown	663	22.4	+0.4
Majority		380	12.8	+5.7
Turnout		2,965	24.6	+3.7
Labour hold		Swing		

Weaste & Seedley
Party	Candidate	Votes	%	±%
Labour	Anthony Ullman	969	46.4	+13.3
Liberal Democrats	Margaret Powls	916	43.9	−1.4
Liberal	Andrew Priest	203	9.7	+9.7
Majority		53	2.5	−9.7
Turnout		2,088	28.8	+2.9
Labour hold		Swing		

Winton
Party	Candidate	Votes	%	±%
Labour	Michelle Wilkinson	1,172	58.5	+8.5
Liberal Democrats	Sara Bradbury	451	22.5	−3.5
Conservative	Judith Tope	379	18.9	−5.1
Majority		721	36.0	+12.0
Turnout		2,002	22.6	+4.2
Labour hold		Swing		

Worsley & Boothstown
Party	Candidate	Votes	%	±%
Liberal Democrats	Robert Boyd	1,772	44.2	+2.3
Conservative	Beryl Howard	1,460	36.4	−9.0
Labour	Warren Coates	636	15.9	+3.2
Green	Ian Davies	141	3.5	+3.5
Majority		312	7.8	+4.3
Turnout		4,009	35.9	+4.6
Liberal Democrats hold		Swing		
