= 2002 Great Yarmouth Borough Council election =

2002 UK local government election

The 2002 Great Yarmouth Borough Council election took place on 2 May 2002 to elect members of Great Yarmouth Borough Council in Norfolk, England. One third of the council was up for election and the Conservative Party stayed in overall control of the council.

After the election, the composition of the council was:

- Conservative 28
- Labour 20

== Election result ==
Great Yarmouth local election result 2002
Party	Seats	Gains	Losses	Net gain/loss	Seats %	Votes %	Votes	+/−
Labour	9			-1	56.3	51.2	9,379	
Conservative	7			+1	43.8	43.3	7,935	
Liberal Democrats	0	0	0	0	0	3.5	632	
Green	0	0	0	0	0	2.0	365	

== Ward results ==
Bradwell North
Party	Candidate	Votes	%	±%
Labour	Trevor Wainwright	812	54.6	
Conservative	Mary Greenacre	587	39.4	
Green	Sheila Chandler	89	6.0	
Majority		225	15.2	
Turnout		1,488		

Bradwell South and Horton
Party	Candidate	Votes	%	±%
Conservative	Brian Howard	776	51.7	
Labour	Christina Rumsby	724	48.3	
Majority		52	3.4	
Turnout		1,500		

Caister North
Party	Candidate	Votes	%	±%
Conservative	Anthony Smith	560	43.5	
Labour	Sandy Griffiths	557	43.3	
Liberal Democrats	Nicholas Dyer	148	11.5	
Green	Paul Scheller	22	1.7	
Majority		3	0.2	
Turnout		1,287		

Caister South
Party	Candidate	Votes	%	±%
Conservative	Susan Lawley	537	48.9	
Labour	Patrick Hacon	517	47.1	
Green	Susan Myers	44	4.0	
Majority		20	1.8	
Turnout		1,098		

Claydon
Party	Candidate	Votes	%	±%
Labour	Julie Fitzgerald	625	60.4	
Conservative	Peter Meah	326	31.5	
Liberal Democrats	Andrew Punchard	84	8.1	
Majority		299	28.9	
Turnout		1,035		

Gorleston
Party	Candidate	Votes	%	±%
Conservative	Jonathan Russell	821	57.7	
Labour	Peter Alexander	424	29.8	
Liberal Democrats	Ivan Lees	177	12.4	
Majority		397	27.9	
Turnout		1,422		

Lichfield and Cobholm
Party	Candidate	Votes	%	±%
Labour	Andrew Wassell	537	78.6	
Conservative	Jason Delf	146	21.4	
Majority		391	57.2	
Turnout		683		

Lothingland
Party	Candidate	Votes	%	±%
Conservative	Mark Thompson	666	57.5	
Labour	Richard Baker	492	42.5	
Majority		174	15.0	
Turnout		1,158		

Magdalen East
Party	Candidate	Votes	%	±%
Labour	Brian Walker	622	62.1	
Conservative	David Denning	379	37.9	
Majority		243	24.2	
Turnout		1,001		

Magdalen West
Party	Candidate	Votes	%	±%
Labour	Carol Doe	784	80.7	
Conservative	Jane Hayes	188	19.3	
Majority		596	61.4	
Turnout		972		

Nelson
Party	Candidate	Votes	%	±%
Labour	Susan Robinson	598	73.8	
Conservative	Joy Cosaitis	170	21.0	
Green	Diane Nottage	42	5.2	
Majority		428	52.8	
Turnout		810		

Northgate
Party	Candidate	Votes	%	±%
Labour	Terence Easter	752	57.6	
Conservative	Alan Baugh	431	33.0	
Liberal Democrats	Anthony Harris	89	6.8	
Green	Robert Chandler	34	2.6	
Majority		321	24.6	
Turnout		1,306		

Ormesby
Party	Candidate	Votes	%	±%
Conservative	Charles Reynolds	855	69.6	
Labour	Michael Pettit	206	16.8	
Liberal Democrats	Rodney Cole	134	10.9	
Green	Paul Orpen	34	2.8	
Majority		649	52.8	
Turnout		1,229		

Regent
Party	Candidate	Votes	%	±%
Conservative	Paul Garrod	506	49.2	
Labour	Jack Barnes	465	45.2	
Green	Andrew Nottage	57	5.5	
Majority		41	4.0	
Turnout		1,028		

St Andrew's
Party	Candidate	Votes	%	±%
Labour	Karen Hewitt	612	57.4	
Conservative	Patrick Cook	454	42.6	
Majority		158	14.8	
Turnout		1,066		

Yarmouth North
Party	Candidate	Votes	%	±%
Labour	Glen Smith	652	53.1	
Conservative	Desmond Sadler	533	43.4	
Green	Roy Walmsley	43	3.5	
Majority		119	9.7	
Turnout		1,228		
