= List of elections in 2002 =

The following elections occurred in the year 2002.

- 2002 Bahraini parliamentary election
- 2002 Comorian presidential election
- 2002 Costa Rican general election
- 2002 East Timorese presidential election
- 2002 Fijian municipal election
- 2002 Greenlandic general election
- 2002 Hong Kong Chief Executive election
- 2002 Malagasy parliamentary election
- 2002 New Zealand general election
- 2002 Seychellois parliamentary election
- 2002 South Korean presidential election
- 2002 Tongan general election
- 2002 Tuvaluan general election

== Africa ==
- 51st National Conference of the African National Congress
- 2002 Algerian legislative election
- 2002 Burkinabé parliamentary election
- 2002 Cameroonian parliamentary election
- 2002 Chadian parliamentary election
- 2002 Equatorial Guinean presidential election
- 2002 Gambian local elections
- 2002 Gambian parliamentary election
- 2002 Guinean legislative election
- 2002 Kenyan general election
- 2002 Lesotho general election
- 2002 Malian parliamentary election
- 2002 Malian presidential election
- 2002 Moroccan parliamentary election
- 2002 Republic of the Congo parliamentary election
- 2002 Republic of the Congo presidential election
- 2002 Republic of the Congo constitutional referendum
- 2002 São Tomé and Príncipe legislative election
- 2002 Somaliland municipal elections
- 2002 Sierra Leonean general election
- 2002 Togolese parliamentary election
- 2002 Tunisian constitutional referendum
- 2002 Zimbabwean presidential election

== Asia ==
- 2002 Abkhazian parliamentary election
- 2002 Azerbaijani constitutional referendum
- 2002 Bangladeshi presidential election
- 2002 East Timorese presidential election
- 2002 Laotian parliamentary election
- 2002 Nagorno-Karabakh presidential election
- 2002 Pakistani general election
- 2001–02 Republic of China local elections
- 2002 South Korean local elections
- 2002 Turkish general election
- 2002 Uzbek constitutional referendum
- 2002 Vietnamese legislative election

=== India ===
- 2002 Gujarat Legislative Assembly election
- 2002 Indian presidential election
- 2002 Indian vice presidential election
- 2002 Punjab Legislative Assembly election
- 2002 Uttar Pradesh Legislative Assembly election
- 2002 Uttarakhand Legislative Assembly election

=== Iraq ===
- 2002 Iraqi presidential referendum

=== Japan ===
- 2002 Amagasaki mayoral election

=== Philippines ===
- 2002 Philippine barangay and Sangguniang Kabataan elections

== Australia ==
- 2002 Cunningham by-election
- 2002 Hornsby state by-election
- 2002 South Australian state election
- 2002 Tasmanian state election
- 2002 Victorian state election

== Europe ==
- 2002 Abkhazian parliamentary election
- 2002 Albanian presidential election
- 2002 Bosnia and Herzegovina general election
- 2002 Czech legislative election
- 2002 Czech Senate election
- 2002 Czech municipal elections
- 2002 Dutch municipal elections
- 2002 Faroese parliamentary election
- 2002 Fine Gael leadership election
- 2002 Georgian local elections
- 2002 Gibraltar sovereignty referendum
- 2002 Greek local elections
- 2002 Hungarian parliamentary election
- 2002 Irish general election
- 2002 Ivano-Frankivsk Oblast local election
- 2002 Jersey general election
- 2002 Latvian parliamentary election
- 2002–2003 Lithuanian presidential election
- 2002 Macedonian parliamentary election
- 2002 Montenegrin parliamentary election
- 2002 Montenegrin presidential election
- 2002 Nagorno-Karabakh presidential election
- 2002 Polish local elections
- 2002 Portuguese legislative election
- December 2002 Serbian presidential election
- Serbian presidential election, September–October 2002
- 2002 Serbian local elections
- 2002 Slovak parliamentary election
- 2002 Slovenian presidential election
- 2002 Stockholm municipal election
- 2002 Swedish county council elections
- 2002 Swedish general election
- 2002 Swedish municipal elections
- 2002 Swiss referendums
- 2002 Turkish general election
- 2002 Ukrainian parliamentary election

=== Austria ===
- 2002 Austrian legislative election

=== France ===
- 2002 French legislative election
- 2002 French presidential election

=== Germany ===
- 2002 German federal election
- 2002 Mecklenburg-Vorpommern state election
- 2002 Saxony-Anhalt state election

=== Netherlands ===
- 2002 Labour Party (Netherlands) leadership election
- 2002 Dutch general election

=== Turkey ===
- 2002 Turkish general election
- 2002 Cihanbeyli by-election

=== United Kingdom ===
- 2002 United Kingdom local elections
- 2002 Ogmore by-election

==== United Kingdom local ====
- 2002 United Kingdom local elections

===== English local =====
- 2002 Worthing Council election
- 2002 Adur Council election
- 2002 Amber Valley Council election
- 2002 Barking and Dagenham Council election
- 2002 Barnet Council election
- 2002 Barrow-in-Furness Council election
- 2002 Bolton Council election
- 2002 Brent Council election
- 2002 Brentwood Council election
- 2002 Bromley Council election
- 2002 Broxbourne Council election
- 2002 Burnley Council election
- 2002 Calderdale Council election
- 2002 Camden Council election
- 2002 Cheltenham Council election
- 2002 Cherwell Council election
- 2002 Chorley Council election
- 2002 Craven Council election
- 2002 Croydon Council election
- 2002 Daventry Council election
- 2002 Derby Council election
- 2002 Eastleigh Council election
- 2002 Ellesmere Port and Neston Council election
- 2002 Epping Forest Council election
- 2002 Fareham Council election
- 2002 Gateshead Council election
- 2002 Gosport Council election
- 2002 Greenwich Council election
- 2002 Halton Council election
- 2002 Harlow Council election
- 2002 Hart Council election
- 2002 Hartlepool Council election
- 2002 Hastings Council election
- 2002 Hull Council election
- 2002 Hyndburn Council election
- 2002 Ipswich Borough Council election
- 2002 Kingston upon Thames Council election
- 2002 Knowsley Council election
- 2002 Lambeth Council election
- 2002 Leeds Council election
- 2002 Lewisham Council election
- 2002 Lincoln Council election
- 2002 Liverpool Council election
- 2002 Manchester Council election
- 2002 Mole Valley Council election
- 2002 Newcastle-under-Lyme Council election
- 2002 Newham Council election
- 2002 Nuneaton and Bedworth Council election
- 2002 Oxford City Council election
- 2002 Penwith Council election
- 2002 Portsmouth Council election
- 2002 Preston Council election
- 2002 Purbeck Council election
- 2002 Redditch Council election
- 2002 Rochdale Council election
- 2002 Rochford Council election
- 2002 Rossendale Council election
- 2002 Rugby Council election
- 2002 Runnymede Council election
- 2002 Rushmoor Council election
- 2002 Salford Council election
- 2002 Sefton Council election
- 2002 Solihull Council election
- 2002 South Lakeland Council election
- 2002 South Tyneside Council election
- 2002 Southend-on-Sea Council election
- 2002 Southwark Council election
- 2002 St Albans Council election
- 2002 St Helens Council election
- 2002 Stevenage Council election
- 2002 Stratford-on-Avon Council election
- 2002 Swindon Council election
- 2002 Tamworth Council election
- 2002 Tandridge Council election
- 2002 Three Rivers Council election
- 2002 Thurrock Council election
- 2002 Tower Hamlets Council election
- 2002 Trafford Council election
- 2002 Tunbridge Wells Council election
- 2002 Wakefield Council election
- 2002 Waltham Forest Council election
- 2002 Wandsworth Council election
- 2002 Watford Council election
- 2002 Waveney Council election
- 2002 Welwyn Hatfield Council election
- 2002 West Lancashire Council election
- 2002 West Lindsey Council election
- 2002 Weymouth and Portland Council election
- 2002 Wigan Council election
- 2002 Winchester Council election
- 2002 Wirral Council election
- 2002 Woking Council election
- 2002 Wokingham Council election
- 2002 Wolverhampton Council election
- 2002 Worcester Council election
- 2002 Wyre Forest Council election

== Japan ==
- 2002 Amagasaki mayoral election

== New Zealand general ==
- List of electorates in the New Zealand general election, 2002, by party vote
- 2002 New Zealand general election

== North America ==
=== Canada ===
- 2002 British Columbia aboriginal treaty referendum
- 2002 Manitoba municipal elections
- 2002 New Democratic Party of Prince Edward Island leadership election
- 2002 Quebec municipal elections
- 2002 Quebec provincial by-elections
- 2002 Vancouver municipal election
- 2002 Cowansville municipal election
- 2002 Victoria municipal election
- 2002 Winnipeg municipal election
- 2002 Yukon general election

=== Caribbean ===
- 2002 Bahamian general election
- 2002 Dominican Republic parliamentary election
- 2002 Jamaican general election
- 2002 Netherlands Antilles general election
- 2002 Trinidad and Tobago general election

=== United States ===
- 2002 United States Senate elections
- 2002 United States House of Representatives elections
- 2002 United States elections

==== United States lieutenant gubernatorial ====
- 2002 Alabama lieutenant gubernatorial election
- 2002 Arkansas lieutenant gubernatorial election
- 2002 California lieutenant gubernatorial election
- 2002 Georgia lieutenant gubernatorial election
- 2002 Oklahoma lieutenant gubernatorial election
- 2002 Pennsylvania lieutenant gubernatorial election
- 2002 Texas lieutenant gubernatorial election

==== United States gubernatorial ====
- 2002 Alabama gubernatorial election
- 2002 Alaska gubernatorial election
- 2002 Arizona gubernatorial election
- 2002 Arkansas gubernatorial election
- 2002 California gubernatorial election
- 2002 Colorado gubernatorial election
- 2002 Connecticut gubernatorial election
- 2002 Florida gubernatorial election
- 2002 Georgia gubernatorial election
- 2002 Idaho gubernatorial election
- 2002 Illinois gubernatorial election
- 2002 Iowa gubernatorial election
- 2002 Maine gubernatorial election
- 2002 Maryland gubernatorial election
- 2002 Michigan gubernatorial election
- 2002 Minnesota gubernatorial election
- 2002 New Mexico gubernatorial election
- 2002 New York gubernatorial election
- 2002 Oklahoma gubernatorial election
- 2002 Oregon gubernatorial election
- 2002 Pennsylvania gubernatorial election
- 2002 Rhode Island gubernatorial election
- 2002 South Carolina gubernatorial election
- 2002 South Dakota gubernatorial election
- 2002 Texas gubernatorial election
- 2002 United States gubernatorial elections
- 2002 Wisconsin gubernatorial election

==== United States mayoral ====
- 2002 Anaheim mayoral election
- 2002 Auburn, Alabama municipal election
- 2002 Dallas mayoral special election
- 2002 Flint mayoral recall election
- 2002 Flint mayoral special election
- 2002 Irvine mayoral election
- 2002 Long Beach, California, mayoral election
- 2002 Louisville mayoral election
- 2002 New Orleans mayoral election
- 2002 Newark mayoral election
- 2002 Oakland mayoral election
- 2002 Providence, Rhode Island mayoral election
- 2002 San Jose, California, mayoral election
- 2002 Shreveport mayoral election
- 2002 Sioux Falls mayoral election
- 2002 Tulsa mayoral election
- 2002 Washington, D.C., mayoral election

==== Arizona ====
- 2002 Arizona gubernatorial election

==== Arkansas ====
- 2002 Arkansas gubernatorial election

==== California ====
- 2002 California state elections
- 2002 California Attorney General election
- 2002 California gubernatorial election
- 2002 California Insurance Commissioner election
- 2002 California Secretary of State election
- 2002 California State Controller election
- 2002 California State Treasurer election
- 2002 California Superintendent of Public Instruction election
- 2002 California lieutenant gubernatorial election
- 2002 California Courts of Appeal election
- 2002 San Francisco Board of Supervisors election
- 2002 California State Senate election
- 2002 California State Assembly election

==== Florida ====
- 2002 Florida gubernatorial election

==== Georgia (U.S. state) ====
- 2002 Georgia gubernatorial election
- United States House of Representatives elections in Georgia, 2002

==== Guam ====
- 2002 Guamanian general election

==== Hawaii ====
- 2002 Hawaii gubernatorial election

==== Illinois ====
- 2002 Illinois gubernatorial election
- United States Senate election in Illinois, 2002

==== Kansas ====
- 2002 Kansas gubernatorial election
- United States Senate election in Kansas, 2002

==== Louisiana ====
- 2002 New Orleans mayoral election
- United States Senate election in Louisiana, 2002

==== Maryland ====
- 2002 Maryland gubernatorial election

==== Massachusetts ====
- 2002 Massachusetts general election
- 2002 Massachusetts gubernatorial election
- United States Senate election in Massachusetts, 2002

==== Michigan ====
- 2002 Michigan gubernatorial election
- United States Senate election in Michigan, 2002

==== Montana ====
- United States Senate election in Montana, 2002

==== New Hampshire ====
- 2002 New Hampshire Senate election phone jamming scandal
- United States Senate election in New Hampshire, 2002

==== New Mexico ====
- 2002 New Mexico gubernatorial election
- United States Senate election in New Mexico, 2002

==== New York ====
- 2002 New York state elections
- 2002 New York gubernatorial election
- 2002 New York Comptroller election
- 2002 New York Attorney General election
- United States House of Representatives elections in New York, 2002

==== North Carolina ====
- 2002 North Carolina General Assembly election
- 2002 North Carolina House of Representatives election
- 2002 North Carolina Senate election
- 2002 North Carolina judicial elections
- United States House of Representatives elections in North Carolina, 2002
- United States Senate election in North Carolina, 2002

==== Oklahoma ====
- 2002 Oklahoma state elections
- 2002 Oklahoma gubernatorial election
- United States Senate election in Oklahoma, 2002

==== Oregon ====
- 2002 Oregon gubernatorial election
- United States Senate election in Oregon, 2002

==== Pennsylvania ====
- 2002 Pennsylvania gubernatorial election
- 2002 Pennsylvania lieutenant gubernatorial election
- 2002 Pennsylvania House of Representatives elections
- 2002 Pennsylvania Senate election
- 2002 Pennsylvania state elections
- United States House of Representatives elections in Pennsylvania, 2002

==== Rhode Island ====
- 2002 Rhode Island gubernatorial election

==== South Dakota ====
- United States House of Representatives election in South Dakota, 2002
- 2002 South Dakota gubernatorial election
- United States Senate election in South Dakota, 2002

==== Tennessee ====
- United States Senate election in Tennessee, 2002

==== United States House of Representatives ====
- 2002 United States House of Representatives elections
- United States House of Representatives elections in California, 2002
- United States House of Representatives elections in Georgia, 2002
- United States House of Representatives elections in Indiana, 2002
- United States House of Representatives elections in New York, 2002
- United States House of Representatives election in North Dakota, 2002
- United States House of Representatives elections in South Carolina, 2002
- United States House of Representatives election in South Dakota, 2002

==== United States Senate ====
- United States Senate election in Alaska, 2002
- United States Senate election in Arkansas, 2002
- United States Senate election in Colorado, 2002
- United States Senate election in Delaware, 2002
- United States Senate election in Idaho, 2002
- United States Senate election in Illinois, 2002
- United States Senate election in Iowa, 2002
- United States Senate election in Kansas, 2002
- United States Senate election in Kentucky, 2002
- United States Senate election in Louisiana, 2002
- Charles McGee
- United States Senate election in Maine, 2002
- United States Senate election in Massachusetts, 2002
- United States Senate election in Michigan, 2002
- United States Senate election in Minnesota, 2002
- United States Senate election in Mississippi, 2002
- United States Senate special election in Missouri, 2002
- United States Senate election in Montana, 2002
- United States Senate election in Nebraska, 2002
- United States Senate election in New Hampshire, 2002
- 2002 New Hampshire Senate election phone jamming scandal
- United States Senate election in New Mexico, 2002
- United States Senate election in North Carolina, 2002
- United States Senate election in Oklahoma, 2002
- United States Senate election in Oregon, 2002
- United States Senate election in Rhode Island, 2002
- United States Senate election in South Carolina, 2002
- United States Senate election in South Dakota, 2002
- United States Senate election in Tennessee, 2002
- United States Senate election in Texas, 2002
- 2002 United States Senate elections
- United States Senate election in Georgia, 2002
- United States Senate election in New Jersey, 2002
- United States Senate election in Virginia, 2002
- United States Senate election in West Virginia, 2002
- United States Senate election in Wyoming, 2002

==== Virginia ====
- United States Senate election in Virginia, 2002

==== Washington, D.C. ====
- 2002 Washington, D.C. mayoral election

==== West Virginia ====
- United States Senate election in West Virginia, 2002

==== Wisconsin ====
- 2002 Wisconsin gubernatorial election

==== Wyoming ====
- United States Senate election in Wyoming, 2002

== Oceania ==
- 2002 Micronesian constitutional referendum
- 2002 Niuean general election
- 2002 Papua New Guinean general election
- 2002 Penrhyn by-election
- 2002 Vanuatuan general election
- 2002 Wallis and Futuna Territorial Assembly election

=== Australia ===
- 2002 Cunningham by-election
- 2002 Hornsby state by-election
- 2002 South Australian state election
- 2002 Tasmanian state election
- 2002 Victorian state election

=== Guam ===
- 2002 Guamanian general election

=== Hawaii ===
- 2002 Hawaii gubernatorial election

=== New Zealand ===
- 2002 New Zealand general election

==== New Zealand general ====
- List of electorates in the New Zealand general election, 2002, by party vote
- 2002 New Zealand general election

== South America ==
- 2002 Bolivian presidential election
- 2002 Brazilian general election
- 2002 Colombian legislative election
- 2002 Colombian presidential election
- 2002 Ecuadorian general election
