= 1996 United States presidential election in South Carolina =

- November 5, 1996
- Turnout: 42% (VAP)

Nominee	Bob Dole	Bill Clinton	Ross Perot
Party	Republican	Democratic	Reform
Alliance			Patriot
Home state	Kansas	Arkansas	Texas
Running mate	Jack Kemp	Al Gore	Pat Choate
Electoral vote	8	0	0
Popular vote	573,458	504,051	64,386
Percentage	49.89%	43.85%	5.60%
County results
Dole
40–50%
50–60%
60–70%
Clinton
40–50%
50–60%
60–70%
President before election
Bill Clinton
Democratic
Elected President
Bill Clinton
Democratic

The 1996 United States presidential election in South Carolina took place on November 7, 1996, as part of the 1996 United States presidential election. Voters chose 8 representatives, or electors to the Electoral College, who voted for president and vice president.

South Carolina was won by Senator Bob Dole (R-KS), with Dole winning 49.89% to 43.85% over President Bill Clinton (D) by a margin of 6.04%. Billionaire businessman Ross Perot (Reform-TX) finished in third, with 5.6% of the popular vote.

This marked the first time that a Democratic nominee was elected twice without winning South Carolina either time. Once a Democratic bastion with a tiny all-white electorate, the state has moved towards the Republicans after their party was taken over by conservatives and Southerners in the 1980s and 1990s. No Democrat has won the state since 1976, and it is now considered one of the safest red states.

As of the 2024 presidential election, this is the last election in which the following counties voted for a Democratic presidential candidate: Chesterfield, Georgetown, Abbeville, Lancaster, and Union.

== Results ==
1996 United States presidential election in South Carolina
Party	Candidate	Running mate	Votes	Percentage	Electoral votes
Republican	Bob Dole	Jack Kemp	573,458	49.89%	8
Democratic	Bill Clinton (incumbent)	Al Gore (incumbent)	504,051	43.85%	0
Reform/Patriot	Ross Perot (Note: Perot vote is the fusion of Reform and Patriot Parties.)	Patrick Choate	64,386	5.60%	0
Libertarian	Harry Browne	Jo Jorgensen	4,271	0.37%	0
U.S. Taxpayers'	Howard Phillips	Herbert Titus	2,043	0.18%	0
Natural Law	Dr. John Hagelin	Dr. V. Tompkins	1,248	0.11%	0

=== Results by county ===
County	Bob Dole Republican		Bill Clinton Democratic		Ross Perot Reform		Various candidates Other parties		Margin		Total votes cast
County	#	%	#	%	#	%	#	%	#	%	Total votes cast
Abbeville	3,054	43.01%	3,493	49.20%	537	7.56%	16	0.23%	-439	-6.19%	7,100
Aiken	26,539	61.61%	14,314	33.23%	1,984	4.61%	237	0.55%	12,225	28.38%	43,074
Allendale	941	28.75%	2,222	67.89%	87	2.66%	23	0.70%	-1,281	-39.14%	3,273
Anderson	24,137	52.74%	17,460	38.15%	3,896	8.51%	276	0.60%	6,677	14.59%	45,769
Bamberg	1,715	32.29%	3,380	63.63%	192	3.61%	25	0.47%	-1,665	-31.34%	5,312
Barnwell	3,808	48.98%	3,620	46.57%	310	3.99%	36	0.46%	188	2.41%	7,774
Beaufort	17,575	53.00%	13,532	40.81%	1,838	5.54%	217	0.65%	4,043	12.19%	33,162
Berkeley	17,691	53.22%	13,358	40.18%	1,922	5.78%	271	0.82%	4,333	13.04%	33,242
Calhoun	2,520	45.02%	2,716	48.52%	316	5.64%	46	0.82%	-196	-3.50%	5,598
Charleston	48,675	50.34%	43,571	45.06%	3,514	3.63%	928	0.96%	5,104	5.28%	96,688
Cherokee	6,689	49.04%	5,821	42.68%	1,064	7.80%	65	0.48%	868	6.36%	13,639
Chester	3,157	34.80%	5,108	56.31%	758	8.36%	49	0.54%	-1,951	-21.51%	9,072
Chesterfield	4,028	38.11%	5,734	54.25%	768	7.27%	39	0.37%	-1,706	-16.14%	10,569
Clarendon	3,841	37.66%	5,930	58.15%	395	3.87%	32	0.31%	-2,089	-20.49%	10,198
Colleton	4,462	42.90%	5,329	51.24%	550	5.29%	60	0.58%	-867	-8.34%	10,401
Darlington	8,220	45.18%	8,943	49.15%	898	4.94%	133	0.73%	-723	-3.97%	18,194
Dillon	2,774	39.29%	3,992	56.54%	275	3.89%	20	0.28%	-1,218	-17.25%	7,061
Dorchester	15,283	56.63%	9,931	36.80%	1,591	5.90%	182	0.67%	5,352	19.83%	26,987
Edgefield	3,640	48.62%	3,576	47.77%	244	3.26%	26	0.35%	64	0.85%	7,486
Fairfield	2,414	32.29%	4,719	63.12%	284	3.80%	59	0.79%	-2,305	-30.83%	7,476
Florence	18,490	51.26%	15,804	43.81%	1,563	4.33%	213	0.59%	2,686	7.45%	36,070
Georgetown	7,023	42.95%	8,298	50.75%	950	5.81%	81	0.50%	-1,275	-7.80%	16,352
Greenville	71,210	59.13%	41,605	34.55%	6,761	5.61%	844	0.70%	29,605	24.58%	120,420
Greenwood	8,865	48.81%	8,193	45.11%	985	5.42%	120	0.66%	672	3.70%	18,163
Hampton	2,111	28.85%	4,828	65.98%	344	4.70%	34	0.46%	-2,717	-37.13%	7,317
Horry	26,159	47.86%	23,722	43.40%	4,446	8.13%	326	0.60%	2,437	4.46%	54,653
Jasper	2,024	31.29%	4,053	62.66%	348	5.38%	43	0.66%	-2,029	-31.37%	6,468
Kershaw	8,513	52.05%	6,764	41.36%	996	6.09%	81	0.50%	1,749	10.69%	16,354
Lancaster	7,544	42.01%	8,752	48.74%	1,598	8.90%	63	0.35%	-1,208	-6.73%	17,957
Laurens	8,057	48.69%	7,055	42.64%	1,341	8.10%	94	0.57%	1,002	6.05%	16,547
Lee	1,973	33.40%	3,588	60.73%	320	5.42%	27	0.46%	-1,615	-27.33%	5,908
Lexington	39,658	63.23%	18,907	30.15%	3,703	5.90%	452	0.72%	20,751	33.08%	62,720
McCormick	1,104	35.35%	1,858	59.49%	148	4.74%	13	0.42%	-754	-24.14%	3,123
Marion	3,595	34.40%	6,359	60.85%	356	3.41%	141	1.35%	-2,764	-26.45%	10,451
Marlboro	2,148	26.76%	5,348	66.63%	494	6.15%	37	0.46%	-3,200	-39.87%	8,027
Newberry	5,670	50.48%	4,804	42.77%	682	6.07%	76	0.68%	866	7.71%	11,232
Oconee	10,503	52.64%	7,398	37.08%	1,961	9.83%	90	0.45%	3,105	15.56%	19,952
Orangeburg	10,494	34.62%	18,610	61.39%	1,112	3.67%	99	0.33%	-8,116	-26.77%	30,315
Pickens	17,151	61.47%	8,369	30.00%	2,211	7.92%	169	0.61%	8,782	31.47%	27,900
Richland	39,092	41.05%	52,222	54.84%	3,158	3.32%	758	0.80%	-13,130	-13.79%	95,230
Saluda	2,825	49.56%	2,486	43.61%	371	6.51%	18	0.32%	339	5.95%	5,700
Spartanburg	35,972	53.53%	26,814	39.90%	3,885	5.78%	525	0.78%	9,158	13.63%	67,196
Sumter	12,080	47.57%	12,198	48.04%	933	3.67%	181	0.71%	-118	-0.47%	25,392
Union	3,855	38.34%	5,407	53.77%	749	7.45%	44	0.44%	-1,552	-15.43%	10,055
Williamsburg	3,957	34.84%	6,987	61.52%	375	3.30%	38	0.33%	-3,030	-26.68%	11,357
York	22,222	52.26%	16,873	39.68%	3,173	7.46%	255	0.60%	5,349	12.58%	42,523
Totals	573,458	49.89%	504,051	43.85%	64,386	5.60%	7,562	0.66%	69,407	6.04%	1,149,457

==== Counties that flipped from Democratic to Republican ====
- Edgefield

==== Counties that flipped from Republican to Democratic ====
- Sumter
- Union
