= Kevin Alexander Gray =

American political activist (1957–2023)

- Born: July 1, 1957
- Died: March 7, 2023 (aged 65)
- Education: Wofford College
- Notable work: Waiting for Lightning to Strike: The Fundamentals of Black Politics
- Board member of: ACLU

Kevin Alexander Gray (July 1, 1957 – March 7, 2023) was an American political activist and author, based in South Carolina. Gray was involved in community organizing, working on a variety of issues ranging from racial politics, police violence, third-world politics & relations, union organizing & workers’ rights, grassroots political campaigns, marches, actions & political events.

== Early life ==
Spending his early years in Spartanburg, South Carolina, Gray and his younger sister Valerie were among the first blacks to attend the local all-white Fairforest Elementary School in 1969.

Gray was a graduate of Wofford College and worked on his doctoral degree in political science at American University. He served as second in command in Company C, 391st Engineers Combat Corps, United States Army Reserves in Spartanburg in the 1980s. The Corps won the Lt. General Emerson C. Ischner Award in 1988 for the number one Company grade reserve unit in the Army Reserves nationwide. The award is presented annually by the Society of American Military Engineers.

== Activism ==
Gray served as a national board member of the American Civil Liberties Union for four years and was past nine term president of the South Carolina affiliate of the ACLU.

Gray spoke out frequently against South Africa's system of apartheid and in favor of support for Palestine. He participated in protests against the flying of the Confederate flag on the South Carolina State House grounds, burning a Confederate flag in the process. Gray was among citizens standing with Representative Maggie Wallace Glover and other legislators when they filed a 1991 House resolution to remove the Confederate flag from the State House grounds.

Gray was a founding member of the Rainbow Coalition in 1986, and former co-chair of the Southern Rainbow Education Project—a coalition of southern activists. He was also a former contributing editor of the Independent Political Action Bulletin.

Gray organized the Harriet Tubman Freedom House Project which focused on community based political and cultural education. He was Organizer of the National Mobilization Committee Against the Drug War. Advisory board member of DRC Net (Drug Policy Reform Coalition). Gray gave a featured speech at public rallies held after the 2015 Charleston Church Shooting at [Mother] Emanuel African Methodist Episcopal Church.

== Political campaigns ==
Gray served as South Carolina coordinator for the 1988 presidential campaign of Jesse Jackson, 1992 southern political director for the presidential campaign of Iowa Senator Tom Harkin and the 2010 US Senate campaign of Green Party candidate Tom Clements.

In 1997, Gray was an organizer for the Rainbow/PUSH Coalition’s anti-Proposition 209 marches in San Francisco and Sacramento, California.

In 2002, Gray was a gubernatorial candidate representing the South Carolina United Citizens’ Party & Green Party. He did not have the required signatures to be on the ballot, and consequently ran as a write-in candidate.

== Written works ==
Gray authored/edited the following books:

- Waiting for Lightning to Strike: The Fundamentals of Black Politics: Selected Essays on Politics & Culture. 2008. AK Press. ISBN 978-1-904859-91-8
- The Decline of Black Politics – From Malcolm X to Barack Obama. 2008. Verso Books. ISBN 978-1-84467-284-4
- Editor, Killing Trayvons: An Anthology of Violence. 2014, CounterPunch. ISBN 978-0-692-21399-5

=== Additional publications ===
Additional publications by Gray included:

- “A Call for a New Anti-War Movement” appeared in How to Legalize Drugs: Public Health, Social Science and Civil Liberties Perspective, edited by Dr. Jefferson Fish of St. John’s University in 1998. The book is a collection of works by US drug policy experts. Gray's essay examined cultural and ideological aspects of the impact of the “war on drugs” on African Americans. ISBN 978-0-7657-0151-0
- “Soul Brother? Bill Clinton and Black America” in Alexander Cockburn and Jeffrey St. Clair’s Dime's Worth of Difference: Beyond the Lesser of Two Evils, published by CounterPunch, 2004. ISBN 978-1-904859-03-1
- “The Legacy of Strom Thurmond” in Jack Newfield’s American Monsters: 44 Rats, Blackhats and Plutocrats, published by Thunder's Mouth Press, 2004. ISBN 978-1-56025-554-3
- Hopeless: Barack Obama and the Politics of Illusion. Contributor, with Ralph Nader and Kathy Kelly. Jeffrey St. Clair and Joshua Frank, eds. AK Press, 2012. ISBN 978-1-84935-110-2
- “What Malcolm Might Say” in Peace Not Terror: Leaders of the Antiwar Movement Speak Out Against U.S. Foreign Policy Post 9/11, edited by Mary Susannah Robbins, Lexington Books, 2008. ISBN 978-0-7391-2497-0

Gray was a weekly guest on Dave Marsh’s Sirius XM satellite radio show “Live From the Land of Hopes and Dreams” and a frequent panelist on Rev. Jesse Jackson’s Sunday radio broadcast, and NewsTalk on Irish National Radio. Other essays by Gray on race and politics appeared in The Harvard Journal of African American Public Policy – “The Intensification of Racial Solidarity in the 1990s under the guise of Black Nationalism” (1996); The Progressive Magazine, Counterpunch, The Washington Post Outlook Section, Emerge, One Magazine, The Nation, The New Liberator, The American University Graduate Review & numerous other international, national, regional & local publications. Gray’s essays on race, politics, cultural and world affairs were found online at Counterpunch.com, The Black Agenda Report, “Holla If You Hear Me” blog and The Black Commentator. Gray was a frequent columnist for the national monthly magazine The Progressive, a contributing writer for The Charleston Chronicle and The Free Times of Columbia and a former managing editor and contributing editor of Black News in Columbia.

== Later life and death ==
In 2020 Gray opened Railroad BBQ on Hampton Street in Columbia, a restaurant and repository for the hundreds of civil and human rights ephemera he collected over the years.

Gray died on March 7, 2023. He was recognized by Richland County (SC) Council, the South Carolina Legislature, and by Congressman Jim Clyburn.
