= United Citizens Party =

American political party

- Founded: 1969 (Note: Although the party was never formally disestablished, the original UCP went dormant following the 1972 election, the party would be taken over by supporters of Lenora Filani in 1988, being renamed to the PP in 1994, which too went dormant after the 1996 election, and the formation of a South Carolina branch of the Reform Party. The party would again be taken over in 2000 and changed back into the UCP)
- Split from: Democratic Party
- Ideology: Progressivism (US); Black nationalism
- Political position: Center-left to left-wing
- National affiliation: Reform (1996)

Website
- Archived Website

The United Citizens Party (UCP) is an American political party first organized in 1969 in the U.S. state of South Carolina by John Roy Harper II and others, in response to the state Democratic Party's opposition to nominating black candidates. The party's objective was to elect black candidates to the legislature and local offices in counties with black majority populations. The party ran candidates in 1970 and 1972; as a result in 1970 the first three black candidates were elected to the South Carolina House of Representatives since Reconstruction.

== History ==
=== Original formation ===
The first president was John Roy Harper II, named at the first annual convention on April 13, 1970; he later served as party chairman. Harper stated that he had split from the Democratic Party due to the party's refusal to nominate Black candidates. The party's candidate in 1970 was Thomas Broadwater for Governor. The party's founding document stated that it was creating “a separate party running people who will do what we, the people, want done,” and that, “furthermore, whites have never publicly promised Black folks nothing-we need to divorce.”

In 1972 the party was able to secure a line on the ballot for George McGovern in his campaign against Richard Nixon via fusion voting. The 1972 elections also marked the entry of Black South Carolinian Democrats to the House, largely due to the efforts of the UCP, despite the party electing no stand-alone candidates. In 1974, the political scientists Hanes Walton Jr. and William H. Boone cited the UCP up to that point as an example of a successful sub-national African American political party.

=== 1st Refoundation ===
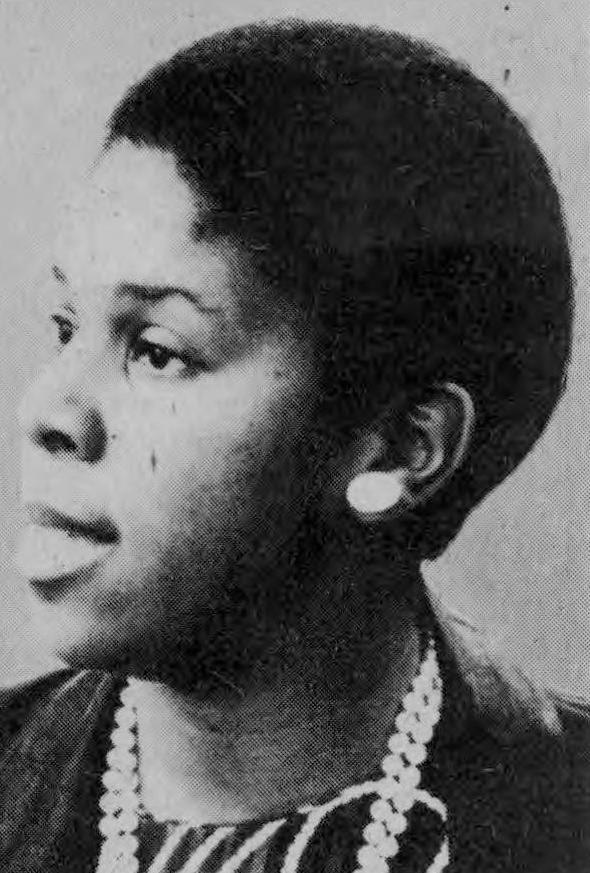
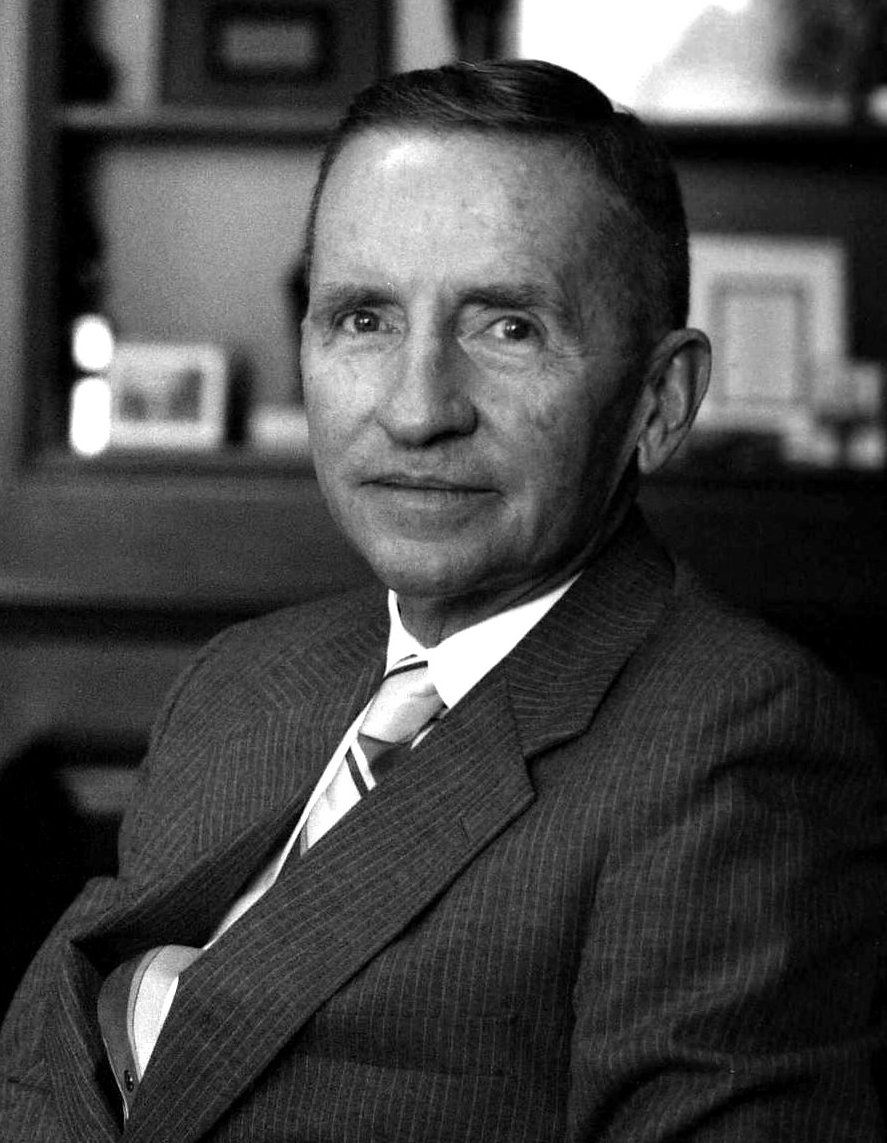
Lenora Fulani (left) ran as the United Citizens candidate for her 1988 and 1992 presidential campaigns; Ross Perot (right) for his 1992 and 1996 presidential campaigns.

Since 1972 the party stood no additional candidates, largely going dormant, however, in 1986 new election laws passed in South Carolina requiring a party to run candidates in at least every other general election. In 1988, the New York based New Alliance Party filed the paperwork to run a candidate for the UCP line, Lenora Fulani, for President of the United States. She ran again as a UCP candidate in her 1992 run for president. During this period Fulani changed the name of the party to the Patriot Party (PP) and was also simultaneously working with supporters of Ross Perot to make a national political party for Perot.

For his second bid for president in 1996, Perot's newly formed Reform Party (RP) also secured ballot access in South Carolina, meaning Perot appeared twice, once for the RP, and the other for the PP. The PP would earn Perot 36,913 votes in South Carolina, to the Reform Party's 27,464. The combined 64,386 votes was 5.60% of the electorate. However, with an established state branch of the Reform party, Perot's supporters migrated, leaving the PP dormant.

=== 2nd Refoundation ===
In 2000, Michael Avey, then a professor of political science at Lander College, with some activist friends, took over the dormant PP and wrote to the Federal Election Commission requesting federal recognition for changing the name back to the United Citizens Party. Ralph Nader ran as the UCP nominee in his 2000 bid for president, earning him 20,279 votes or 1.47% of the electorate. The party's original founder Harper has come out in support of Avey's restored party, applauding his efforts to make a party for Black Americans stating that "The problems and inequities the United Citizens Party identified 30 year ago are still problems today. Sure, there have been a number of black legislators elected, but not enough to make difference without the support of white Democrats, which too rarely happens. The [Democratic] Party gives lip service to the needs of the black community and working people, but it stops there."

In the 2002 election for the Second Congressional District in South Carolina, Mark Whittington received 17,189 votes or 10.03% of the total. Activist and political operative Kevin Alexander Gray was a gubernatorial candidate representing the South Carolina United Citizens’ Party and the South Carolina Green Party. He did not collect the required number of signatures to be on the ballot, and consequently ran as a write-in candidate.

==== 2004 Presidential Elections ====
In presidential election of 2004, the UCP chose to nominate the Socialist Party candidate Walt Brown for president. Brown received 2,124 votes or about 0.1% of the total 1,617,730.

In 2006, the Party endorsed John "JC" Nelums for State House District 79 (Kershaw, Richland) and did not cross-endorse candidates of any other party.

==== 2008 Presidential Elections ====
On March 29, 2008, the party endorsed Barack Obama via convention for the 2008 presidential election, but the nomination was not accepted. Obama appeared on the ballot as solely as the candidate of the Democratic Party.

In 2010, the party cross-endorsed former football player Morgan Bruce Reeves for governor, alongside the South Carolina Green Party. Reeves received 0.9% of the vote. On the November 2014 ballot, the party nominated Reeves for Governor and David Edmond for Commissioner of Agriculture. Reeves received 0.5% of the vote.

In 2018 and 2022, Chris Nelums ran as a United Citizens Party candidate for Commissioner of Agriculture. In 2018 Nelums received 118,671 votes, or 8.85% of the vote; in 2022, he received 95,625 votes, or 6.84% of the vote.

==== 2024 Presidential Elections ====
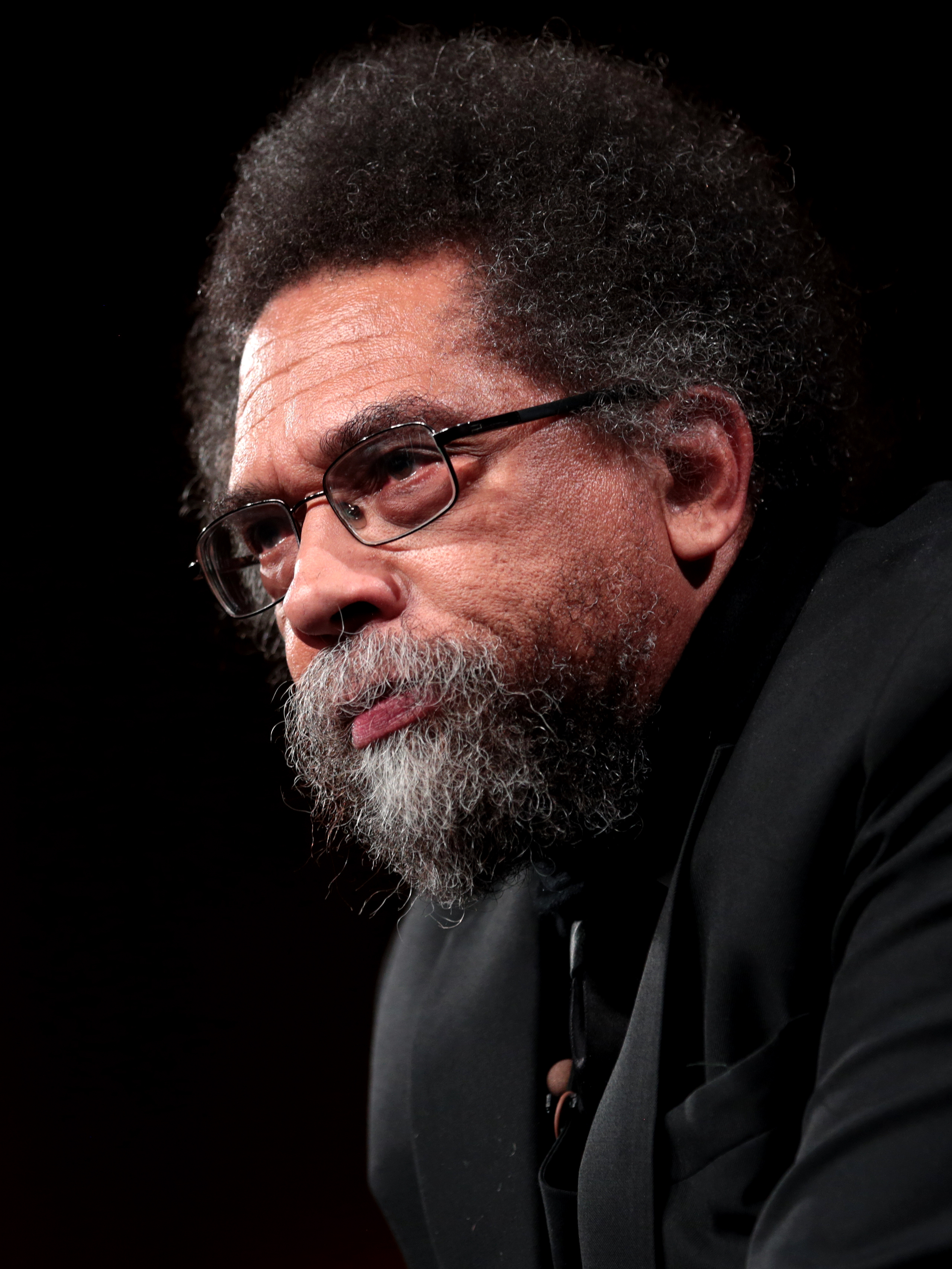
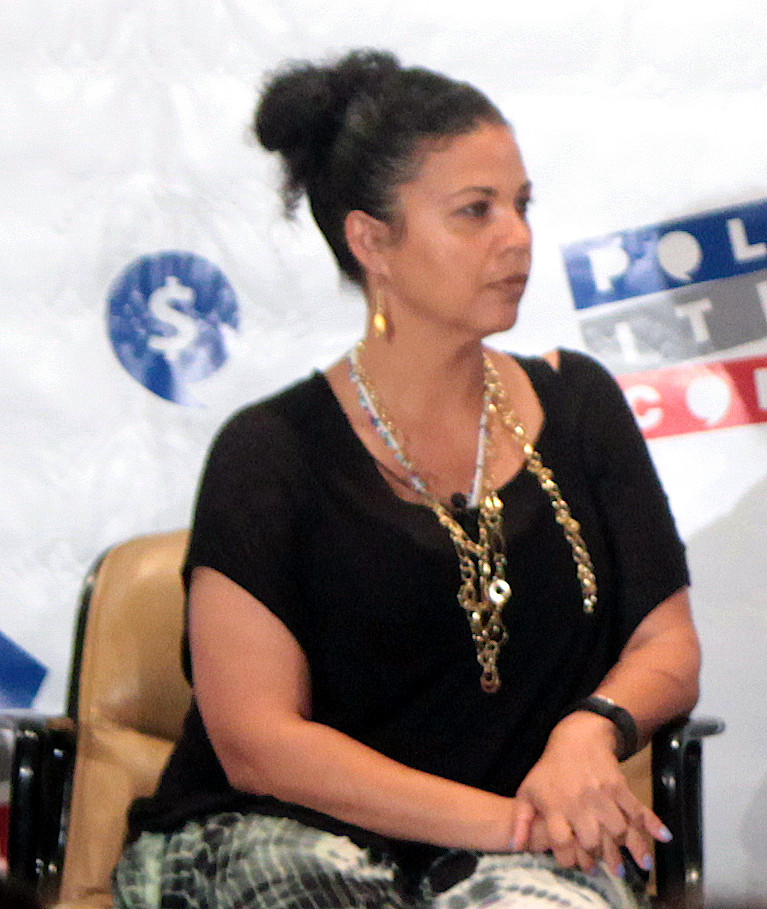
2024 Presidential Candidate Cornel West (left) and his running mate Melina Abdullah (right)

Cornel West's ballot access in 2024, appearing in South Carolina as the UCP Candidate

For the 2024 United States presidential election, the UCP chose to nominate Cornel West. Also on the 2024 UCP ticket were Gregg Marcel Dixon running for South Carolina's 6th Congressional District challenging Democratic incumbent Jim Clyburn, and Chris Nelums running for State Senate District 19, challenging Democratic incumbent Tameika Isaac Devine. Neither the UCP's leadership, nor its candidates, responded to requests from The State for an interview to be included in their profile of third-party candidates. None of the party's candidates were elected.

== Presidential nominees ==
- 1972 – George McGovern
- 1984 – Dennis Serrette
- 1988 – Lenora Fulani
- 1992 – Lenora Fulani
- 1996 – Ross Perot
- 2000 – Ralph Nader
- 2004 – Walt Brown
- 2008 – Barack Obama
- 2024 – Cornel West

== See also ==
- Peoples, Betsy (November 2002). "Historically Black political party still alive". The New Crisis.
