= 2002 Micronesian constitutional referendum =

A constitutional referendum was held in the Federated States of Micronesia on 27 August 2002. Voters were asked whether they approved of 14 separate amendments to the country's constitution. To be approved, the proposal required at least 75% of voters in at least three of the four states to vote in favour. Ultimately all 14 proposals were rejected, as none passed the 75% threshold in any state.

== Background ==
The Micronesian constitution requires a referendum to be held every 10 years on convening a constitutional convention. Such a referendum had been held in 1999, with a majority in favour of a convention. A Constitutional Convention was subsequently elected in 2001. It sat from 12 November until 26 December 2001 and proposed 14 constitutional amendments.

On 8 March 2002 President Leo Falcam proposed holding a referendum on two proposals (electoral system and direct election of the president and vice president) on 27 August and the remaining eleven proposals to be held alongside the 2003 parliamentary elections. However, he changed the plans on 19 April so that all 14 proposals would be put to voters on the same day.

== Proposed constitutional amendments ==
Ref no.	Proposal
CP 01-01	To amend Article XI, section 2 of the Constitution of the Federated States of Micronesia, to require that a minimum of four justices shall serve on the bench of the FSM Supreme Court; to require that at least one justice reside in each of the four states; and to provide that the Chief Justice may appoint a justice pro tem if a vacancy that causes the total number of justices to fall below four is not filled within one year.
CP 01-02	To amend Article III, sections 1, 2, 3, 4 and 5 of the Constitution of the Federated States of Micronesia to allow FSM citizens to hold dual citizenship.
CP 01-05	To amend Article XI, sections 6(a) and 6(b) of the Constitution of the Federated States of Micronesia by deleting the words "including the trial division of the Supreme Court" and inserting an exception to the relevant Article that will prohibit or strip the National Courts of any jurisdiction whatsoever in cases where ownership of land and waters are at issue regardless of the diversity of citizenship.
CP 01-07	To enact a new section 8 of Article XIII of the Constitution of the Federated States of Micronesia, to provide for full faith and credit among the States.
CP 01-08	To enact a new section 4 of Article XII of the Constitution of the Federated States of Micronesia, to create the Office of the Independent Prosecutor.
CP 01-09	To enact a new section 8 of Article X of the Constitution of the Federated States of Micronesia, to provide for a continual annuity for former Presidents and Vice Presidents and to renumber sections 8 and 9.
CP 01-11	To amend Article XIII, section 1 of the Constitution of the Federated States of Micronesia, to require the National Government to establish certain standards for primary and secondary schools and to establish a fund to help the schools meet those standards.
CP 01-13	To amend Article IX, section 3 of the Constitution of the Federated States of Micronesia by enacting a new subsection (d) for the purpose of conferring on the National Government and State Governments the concurrent power to levy value-added taxes.
CP 01-15	To amend Article IX, section 5 of the Constitution of the Federated States of Micronesia for the purpose of altering the distribution of tax revenue between the National Government and the States to increase the States' share of revenue from not less than 50 percent to not less than 80 percent.
CP 01-16	To amend Article IX, section 8 of the Constitution of the Federated States of Micronesia, to provide for the number of at large members and the length of terms of members of Congress, and a limitation on the number of years a member of Congress may serve.
CP 01-21	To amend Article X, sections 1, 4, 5 and 6 of the Constitution of the Federated States of Micronesia, to provide for direct election of the President and Vice President.
CP 01-24	To amend Article XII, section 1(b) of the Constitution of the Federated States of Micronesia, relating to foreign financial assistance.
CP 01-25	To amend Article IX, sections 8 and 20 of the Constitution of the Federated States of Micronesia, to provide for the number of votes required to pass a bill on First and Second Readings.
CP 01-26	To amend Article IX, subsection 2(q) of the Constitution of the Federated States of Micronesia, to provide for the number of votes required to override a Presidential veto.

== Results ==
Proposal	For			Against			Invalid/ blank votes	Total votes	Registered voters	Turnout
Proposal	Votes	%	States	Votes	%	States	Invalid/ blank votes	Total votes	Registered voters	Turnout
CP 01-01	7,527	52.23	0	6,885	47.77	4	536	15,005	67,099	22.36
CP 01-02	7,739	54.14	0	6,555	45.86	4	711	15,005	67,099	22.36
CP 01-05	7,728	53.69	0	6,666	46.31	4	611	15,005	67,099	22.36
CP 01-07	7,718	53.58	0	6,686	46.42	4	601	15,005	67,099	22.36
CP 01-08	7,600	53.84	0	6,516	46.16	4	889	15,005	67,099	22.36
CP 01-09	3,757	25.89	0	10,752	74.11	4	496	15,005	67,099	22.36
CP 01-11	9,037	63.30	0	5,239	36.70	4	729	15,005	67,099	22.36
CP 01-13	7,284	50.49	0	7,142	49.51	4	579	15,005	67,099	22.36
CP 01-15	8,263	57.50	0	6,108	42.50	4	634	15,005	67,099	22.36
CP 01-16	6,210	43.14	0	8,186	56.86	4	609	15,005	67,099	22.36
CP 01-21	7,589	52.87	0	6,765	47.13	4	651	15,005	67,099	22.36
CP 01-24	8,001	53.92	0	6,837	46.08	4	167	15,005	67,099	22.36
CP 01-25	7,154	49.85	0	7,197	50.15	4	654	15,005	67,099	22.36
CP 01-26	7,555	53.24	0	6,635	46.76	4	815	15,005	67,099	22.36
