= 2002 Gambian local elections =

Local elections were held in the Gambia on 25 April 2002. The elections were the first to be under the 2002 local government act. The elections were boycotted by the primary opposition party, the United Democratic Party.
