= 2002 Pennsylvania elections =

- November 5, 2002

Elections were held in Pennsylvania on November 5, 2002. Necessary primary elections were held on May 21, 2002.

== Ballot Question ==
Volunteer Fire And Emergency Services Referendum
Candidate	Votes	%
Yes	1,833,795	72.6
No	691,319	27.4

Referendum results by county Yes: 80–90%; 70–80%; 60–70%; No: 50–60%
