= 2002 Ivano-Frankivsk Oblast local election =

Local election in Ukraine

All 120 seats to the Ivano-Frankivsk Oblast Council
| | Majority party | Minority party | Third party |
|---|---|---|---|
| Party | KUN | Rukh | People's |
| Seats won | 13 | 10 | 7 |
| Percentage | 13.83% | 10.64% | 7.45% |
Elected Head of Council
Vasyl Brus
Independent

Ivano-Frankivsk Oblast local election, 2002 is a local election in Ivano-Frankivsk Oblast.

== Results ==
Seats and percentage
| CUN (13) | 13.83% |
| Rukh (10) | 10.64% |
| Agrarian Party (7) | 7.45% |
| Ukrainian People's Party (6) | 6.38% |
| Others (seven parties) (14) | 14.89% |
| Unaffiliated (44) | 46.81% |
| Total (114) | 95.00% |

Presidium of the Council

- Chairman: Vasyl Brus (unaffiliated)
- First Deputy Chairman:
- Deputy Chairman:
- Director of Council's secretariat:
