= 2002 Arkansas lieutenant gubernatorial election =

- November 5, 2002
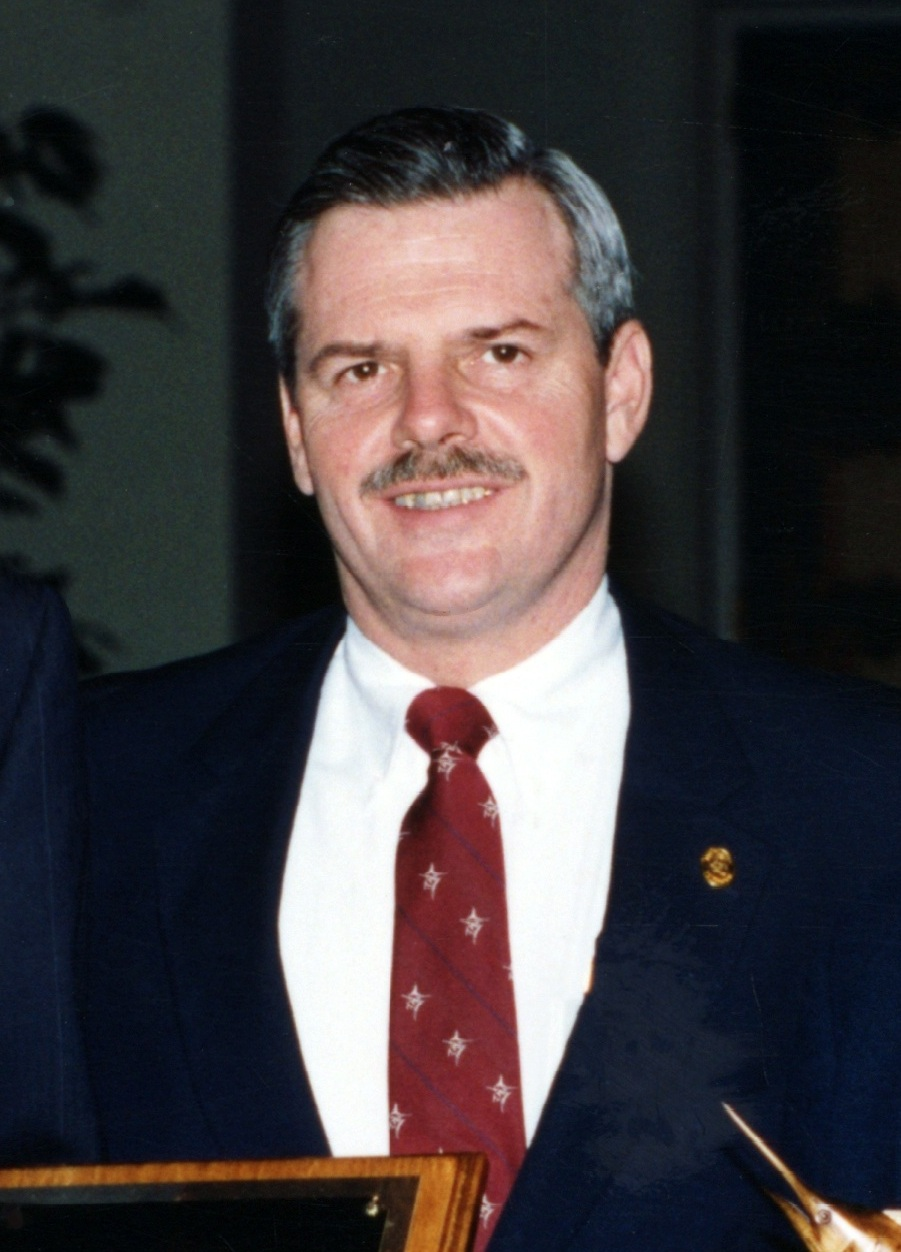

Nominee	Winthrop Paul Rockefeller	Ronald Lee Sheffield
Party	Republican	Democratic
Popular vote	477,062	318,592
Percentage	59.96%	40.04%
- County results Rockefeller: 50–60% 60–70% 70–80% Sheffield: 50–60%
Lieutenant Governor before election
Winthrop Paul Rockefeller
Republican
Elected Lieutenant Governor
Winthrop Paul Rockefeller
Republican

The 2002 Arkansas lieutenant gubernatorial election was held on November 5, 2002, to elect the lieutenant governor of Arkansas. Republican incumbent Winthrop Paul Rockefeller won re-election to a second full term, defeating Democratic lawyer Ronald Lee Sheffield by nearly twenty percentage points.

Rockefeller would not serve out his second term in full as he would go on to die of an unclassified myeloproliferative disorder in 2006.

== General election ==
=== Candidates ===
- Winthrop Paul Rockefeller, incumbent lieutenant governor of Arkansas (1996–2006) (Republican)
- Ronald Lee Sheffield, lawyer (Democratic)

=== Results ===
2002 Arkansas lieutenant gubernatorial election results
Party	Candidate	Votes	%	±%
Republican	Winthrop Paul Rockefeller	477,062	59.96%	−6.71%
Democratic	Ronald Lee Sheffield	318,592	40.04%	+6.71%
Total votes		795,654	100.00%	
Republican hold				
