= List of electorates in the 2002 New Zealand general election by party vote =

This is a sortable list of the percentage of the party vote each party received in each individual electorate in the 2002 New Zealand general election.

Electorate	Labour	National	New Zealand First	ACT	Green	United Future	Progressive	Other
Overall	41.26%	20.93%	10.38%	7.14%	7.00%	6.69%	1.70%	4.89%
Aoraki	44.56%	24.12%	8.81%	4.40%	5.15%	6.00%	2.05%	4.91%
Auckland Central	44.10%	15.03%	5.73%	10.63%	15.80%	4.01%	1.48%	3.22%
Banks Peninsula	40.23%	21.59%	6.40%	7.51%	10.23%	7.43%	2.60%	4.01%
Bay of Plenty	30.89%	23.29%	22.53%	4.76%	5.52%	8.19%	0.78%	4.04%
Christchurch Central	44.21%	17.04%	6.72%	5.89%	11.10%	6.76%	1.87%	6.41%
Christchurch East	51.29%	13.88%	8.05%	3.85%	6.57%	7.61%	3.72%	5.03%
Clevedon	34.18%	24.71%	13.86%	11.39%	3.91%	7.26%	1.02%	3.67%
Clutha-Southland	31.82%	40.69%	6.77%	5.11%	3.45%	6.60%	1.02%	4.54%
Coromandel	34.39%	22.38%	16.76%	6.24%	9.44%	6.30%	1.16%	3.33%
Dunedin North	49.71%	16.19%	4.46%	4.19%	12.36%	5.54%	1.97%	5.58%
Dunedin South	55.89%	15.27%	6.15%	3.49%	6.21%	5.87%	2.33%	4.79%
East Coast Bays	33.81%	24.83%	9.97%	11.97%	5.19%	9.62%	1.27%	3.34%
East Coast	40.67%	21.77%	13.88%	4.86%	5.70%	6.47%	1.68%	4.97%
Epsom	28.72%	29.24%	6.14%	20.48%	6.65%	5.72%	0.78%	2.27%
Hamilton East	35.75%	23.81%	10.24%	9.80%	7.17%	8.31%	1.12%	3.80%
Hamilton West	41.62%	21.00%	11.71%	8.12%	5.72%	6.83%	1.24%	3.76%
Helensville	30.83%	25.81%	11.94%	12.61%	6.02%	8.29%	0.93%	3.57%
Hutt South	45.40%	18.56%	6.94%	8.03%	6.43%	8.76%	1.82%	4.06%
Ikaroa-Rawhiti	60.08%	3.49%	12.40%	0.73%	9.25%	1.62%	1.29%	11.14%
Ilam	33.24%	29.87%	6.99%	10.14%	5.88%	8.28%	1.57%	4.03%
Invercargill	46.73%	26.60%	6.10%	3.56%	4.30%	6.14%	2.52%	4.05%
Kaikoura	39.25%	25.51%	8.77%	5.82%	6.90%	5.77%	1.77%	6.21%
Mana	47.52%	17.27%	6.30%	6.18%	7.41%	8.91%	1.91%	4.50%
Mangere	70.90%	7.41%	6.39%	2.31%	3.25%	3.58%	2.49%	3.67%
Manukau East	56.18%	16.12%	8.11%	6.94%	2.56%	4.92%	1.99%	3.18%
Manurewa	56.55%	12.50%	10.19%	5.11%	3.72%	5.53%	2.11%	4.29%
Maungakiekie	50.62%	17.06%	7.67%	8.46%	5.50%	5.85%	1.97%	2.87%
Mt Albert	52.09%	13.10%	6.43%	7.15%	10.68%	5.32%	1.70%	3.53%
Mt Roskill	49.73%	17.15%	7.79%	7.86%	5.28%	7.23%	1.49%	3.47%
Napier	45.63%	18.66%	9.35%	6.33%	6.21%	6.07%	1.51%	6.24%
Nelson	44.92%	19.33%	6.37%	3.99%	8.92%	6.68%	1.31%	8.48%
New Lynn	48.49%	14.81%	10.12%	6.62%	7.16%	7.24%	1.66%	3.90%
New Plymouth	41.58%	21.86%	11.93%	4.92%	6.73%	7.81%	1.21%	3.96%
North Shore	31.27%	27.43%	10.17%	14.13%	6.44%	6.95%	1.05%	2.56%
Northcote	38.78%	21.54%	9.89%	10.18%	6.39%	7.35%	2.43%	3.44%
Northland	29.61%	22.87%	19.03%	7.39%	9.30%	5.81%	1.49%	4.50%
Ohariu-Belmont	36.64%	24.38%	4.90%	10.15%	6.46%	13.01%	1.17%	3.29%
Otago	40.51%	26.51%	6.66%	6.01%	8.13%	5.57%	1.65%	4.96%
Otaki	44.17%	20.65%	10.99%	4.68%	5.53%	7.02%	2.03%	4.93%
Pakuranga	31.95%	26.09%	11.89%	14.51%	3.61%	7.83%	1.22%	2.90%
Palmerston North	42.55%	21.53%	8.61%	5.28%	7.31%	7.40%	1.74%	5.58%
Piako	32.05%	26.68%	15.72%	8.52%	4.74%	6.74%	1.20%	4.35%
Port Waikato	28.10%	27.29%	16.57%	10.76%	5.61%	6.56%	1.01%	4.10%
Rakaia	30.88%	33.95%	8.60%	7.85%	5.00%	7.21%	1.83%	4.68%
Rangitikei	35.83%	27.51%	11.45%	6.08%	4.68%	7.32%	1.52%	5.61%
Rimutaka	46.52%	16.87%	8.27%	6.28%	5.27%	9.18%	2.10%	5.51%
Rodney	32.37%	22.89%	15.38%	9.22%	6.33%	9.26%	1.20%	3.35%
Rongotai	44.95%	16.94%	5.42%	7.06%	13.03%	6.21%	1.88%	4.51%
Rotorua	37.63%	20.43%	16.45%	5.34%	5.90%	7.08%	1.55%	5.62%
Tainui	53.39%	3.88%	14.60%	1.08%	10.04%	2.33%	1.11%	13.57%
Tamaki	34.08%	27.33%	8.27%	16.08%	4.75%	6.50%	0.95%	2.04%
Tamaki Makaurau	55.97%	3.19%	15.03%	1.38%	10.26%	2.54%	1.41%	10.22%
Taranaki-King Country	32.93%	27.57%	14.03%	8.11%	5.08%	5.89%	1.25%	5.14%
Taupo	39.60%	21.91%	13.34%	6.25%	5.39%	5.60%	1.55%	6.36%
Tauranga	32.16%	21.98%	22.06%	4.60%	5.65%	9.56%	0.79%	3.20%
Te Atatū	51.71%	13.16%	10.81%	5.06%	4.57%	7.69%	1.79%	5.21%
Te Tai Hauāuru	56.08%	4.12%	12.66%	0.65%	11.07%	2.61%	1.14%	11.67%
Te Tai Tokerau	47.23%	4.16%	20.49%	1.43%	11.36%	2.15%	1.37%	11.81%
Te Tai Tonga	51.14%	6.79%	12.26%	1.35%	12.84%	3.21%	1.80%	10.61%
Tukituki	40.86%	22.95%	9.78%	7.00%	5.64%	6.43%	1.17%	6.17%
Waiariki	52.93%	3.74%	16.53%	0.55%	9.97%	2.73%	0.86%	12.69%
Waimakariri	42.45%	22.41%	11.31%	5.23%	4.80%	7.02%	2.13%	4.65%
Wairarapa	38.37%	24.83%	11.66%	5.72%	5.91%	5.61%	1.61%	6.29%
Waitakere	46.85%	14.01%	10.65%	6.77%	7.99%	6.78%	1.55%	5.40%
Wellington Central	36.89%	19.96%	3.13%	11.97%	16.25%	6.03%	1.39%	4.38%
West Coast-Tasman	34.15%	21.82%	11.17%	4.30%	10.25%	6.63%	2.20%	9.48%
Whanganui	39.78%	23.58%	12.28%	3.84%	6.09%	6.16%	2.33%	5.94%
Whangarei	35.32%	23.27%	15.55%	8.14%	6.55%	4.60%	1.22%	5.35%
Wigram	45.46%	17.07%	7.09%	4.02%	6.82%	7.51%	6.81%	5.22%
