= 2002 Stratford-on-Avon District Council election =

2002 UK local government election

Results of the 2002 Stratford-on-Avon District Council election

The 2002 Stratford-on-Avon District Council election took place on 2 May 2002 to elect members of Stratford-on-Avon District Council in Warwickshire, England. The whole council was up for election with boundary changes since the last election in 2000 reducing the number of seats by 2. The Conservative Party stayed in overall control of the council.

== Campaign ==
All of the seats on the council were contested after boundary changes had reduced the number of seats from 55 to 53. Before the election the Conservatives ran the council with an overall majority of 1 seat.

The Liberal Democrats were the main opposition on the council and contested 46 of the 53 seats. They attacked the Conservatives for increasing council tax since taking control in 2000, while cutting grants to various groups and moving the council offices to a rented site. The Conservatives however defended their record saying that the move in council offices would save money and that they had introduced a new bus pass allowing cheaper travel. Other issues raised in the election included social housing, the environment, speeding traffic and recycling.

The results were counted electronically as part of a pilot scheme, while voters were able to use electronic voting in 140 electronic polling booths. This was expected to lead to results being declared much earlier than in many areas, with some expected within minutes of polls closing. However while turnout was quite high at around 40%, the results were delayed after the computers did not perform as well as expected.

== Election result ==
The results saw the Conservatives retain an overall majority of just 1 seat on the council. They made gains in Ettington, Snitterfield and the new ward of Stockton and Napton, but lost seats in Studley and Harbury. The Liberal Democrats made gains primarily at the expense of independents, who lost the most seats in the election. Meanwhile, Labour retained their 2 seats in Southam, but failed to make any gains.

Stratford-on-Avon local election result 2002
Party	Seats	Gains	Losses	Net gain/loss	Seats %	Votes %	Votes	+/−
Conservative	27			-1	50.9	43.3	29,117	-11.2%
Liberal Democrats	21			+2	39.6	41.8	28,115	+13.3%
Independent	3			-3	5.7	7.7	5,198	-2.7%
Labour	2			0	3.8	6.7	4,501	+0.7%
Green	0			0	0	0.5	358	-0.1%

== Ward results ==
Alcester (3)
Party	Candidate	Votes	%	±%
Liberal Democrats	Susan Juned	1,435		
Liberal Democrats	Clifford Meade	1,149		
Liberal Democrats	Pamela Price	1,085		
Conservative	William Malin	568		
Conservative	Keith Greenaway	449		
Turnout		4,686		

Aston Cantlow
Party	Candidate	Votes	%	±%
Conservative	William Lawrence	403	55.1	
Liberal Democrats	Shahid Juned	328	44.9	
Majority		75	10.2	
Turnout		731		

Bardon
Party	Candidate	Votes	%	±%
Conservative	John Winterburn	429	60.2	
Liberal Democrats	Jack Crimp	223	31.3	
Independent	Ronald Mole	61	8.6	
Majority		206	28.9	
Turnout		713		

Bidford and Salford (3)
Party	Candidate	Votes	%	±%
Liberal Democrats	Daren Pemberton	899		
Independent	Kim James	678		
Conservative	Brian Slaughter	650		
Liberal Democrats	John Sandle	646		
Conservative	David Harrison	558		
Liberal Democrats	John Insoll	531		
Turnout		3,962		

Brailes
Party	Candidate	Votes	%	±%
Conservative	Philip Seccombe	580	73.0	
Liberal Democrats	Sheila Ribbans	214	27.0	
Majority		366	46.0	
Turnout		794		

Burton Dassett
Party	Candidate	Votes	%	±%
Conservative	Brian Hampson	438	70.2	
Liberal Democrats	Edward Nash	186	29.8	
Majority		252	40.4	
Turnout		624		

Claverdon
Party	Candidate	Votes	%	±%
Conservative	Jane Harrison	567	81.8	
Liberal Democrats	Brian Wright	126	18.2	
Majority		441	63.6	
Turnout		693		

Ettington
Party	Candidate	Votes	%	±%
Conservative	Isobel Seccomber	453	55.6	
Liberal Democrats	Anthony Gerwitz	362	44.4	
Majority		91	11.2	
Turnout		815		

Fenny Compton
Party	Candidate	Votes	%	±%
Conservative	Christopher Williams	543	61.1	
Independent	Jennifer Cranfield	346	38.9	
Majority		197	22.2	
Turnout		889		

Harbury (2)
Party	Candidate	Votes	%	±%
Liberal Democrats	Andrew Patrick	695		
Liberal Democrats	Shenagh Booth	678		
Conservative	Eric Dally	653		
Conservative	James Turner	639		
Labour	Jack Heath	153		
Labour	Bernard Price	119		
Turnout		2,937		

Henley (2)
Party	Candidate	Votes	%	±%
Conservative	Nigel Hastilow	939		
Conservative	Ann Haddon	864		
Liberal Democrats	Anastasia Wright	576		
Liberal Democrats	Karyl Rees	432		
Turnout		2,811		

Kineton (2)
Party	Candidate	Votes	%	±%
Liberal Democrats	Alan Higgs	877		
Liberal Democrats	Louise Giblin	749		
Conservative	Christopher Mills	616		
Conservative	Richard Hurley	587		
Labour	Richard Ashworth	128		
Turnout		2,957		

Kinwarton
Party	Candidate	Votes	%	±%
Liberal Democrats	Lynn Blowring	479	57.0	
Conservative	Sylvia Hyde	361	43.0	
Majority		118	14.0	
Turnout		840		

Long Compton
Party	Candidate	Votes	%	±%
Conservative	Richard Adams	650	73.9	
Liberal Democrats	Virginia Mason	229	26.1	
Majority		421	47.8	
Turnout		879		

Long Itchington
Party	Candidate	Votes	%	±%
Conservative	Bob Stevens	574	72.3	
Labour	Rhona Hazell	220	27.7	
Majority		354	44.6	
Turnout		794		

Quinton
Party	Candidate	Votes	%	±%
Conservative	Michael Brain	505	52.3	
Liberal Democrats	Judith Lockhart	460	47.7	
Majority		45	4.6	
Turnout		965		

Sambourne
Party	Candidate	Votes	%	±%
Conservative	Leslie Topham	328	70.2	
Liberal Democrats	Timothy Knapman	139	29.8	
Majority		189	40.4	
Turnout		467		

Shipston (2)
Party	Candidate	Votes	%	±%
Conservative	Trevor Russell	729		
Liberal Democrats	Bob White	728		
Conservative	Stephen Gray	700		
Liberal Democrats	Bob Brabyn	615		
Turnout		2,772		

Snitterfield
Party	Candidate	Votes	%	±%
Conservative	Richard Hobbs	615	77.9	
Liberal Democrats	Larry Coltman	174	22.1	
Majority		441	55.8	
Turnout		789		

Southam (3)
Party	Candidate	Votes	%	±%
Conservative	Alan Akelster	926		
Labour	Carol Pratt	771		
Labour	James Taylor	747		
Labour	Peter Thomas	727		
Turnout		3,171		

Stockton and Napton
Party	Candidate	Votes	%	±%
Conservative	Peter Garrett	295	43.6	
Labour	Peter Hartland	203	30.0	
Liberal Democrats	Charles Williams	178	26.3	
Majority		92	13.6	
Turnout		676		

Stratford Alveston (3)
Party	Candidate	Votes	%	±%
Conservative	Stuart Beese	1,040		
Conservative	Lynda Organ	962		
Conservative	Frederick Parrott	883		
Liberal Democrats	Joan McFarlane	788		
Liberal Democrats	Trevor Honychurch	711		
Liberal Democrats	Judith Riley	683		
Turnout		5,067		

Stratford Avenue and New Town (3)
Party	Candidate	Votes	%	±%
Liberal Democrats	Maureen Beckett	861		
Conservative	Juliet Short	740		
Liberal Democrats	Bill Lowe	664		
Conservative	Joyce Chadwick	630		
Liberal Democrats	Alan Hawkins	628		
Independent	Keith Floyd	606		
Conservative	Richard Mayes	527		
Labour	Karen Parnell	115		
Labour	Desmond Thurlby	86		
Turnout		4,857		

Stratford Guild and Hathaway (3)
Party	Candidate	Votes	%	±%
Liberal Democrats	Ron Cockings	1,008		
Liberal Democrats	Tom Baxter	956		
Liberal Democrats	Clive Thomas	888		
Conservative	Giovanni Renna	882		
Conservative	Roy Lodge	795		
Conservative	Caron Cottam	692		
Labour	Janice Sewell	231		
Labour	Doreen Wright	171		
Turnout		5,623		

Stratford Mount Pleasant (2)
Party	Candidate	Votes	%	±%
Liberal Democrats	Charles Bates	796		
Liberal Democrats	Peter Moorse	663		
Independent	Valerie Adams	373		
Conservative	Nigel Penn	299		
Labour	Matthew Stephens	101		
Labour	Ewan Wainwright	72		
Turnout		2,304		

Studley (3)
Party	Candidate	Votes	%	±%
Liberal Democrats	Hazel Wright	885		
Conservative	William McCarthy	780		
Liberal Democrats	Tony Cronin	774		
Liberal Democrats	Sally Macreavy	691		
Conservative	Desmond Maries	625		
Conservative	Heather Wersocki	558		
Labour	Clive Rickhards	372		
Labour	Michael Gerrard	285		
Turnout		4,970		

Tanworth (2)
Party	Candidate	Votes	%	±%
Conservative	Anthony Dixon	759		
Conservative	John Lawley	683		
Independent	Peter Brown	459		
Liberal Democrats	Andrew Cooley	191		
Turnout		2,092		

Tredington
Party	Candidate	Votes	%	±%
Conservative	Christopher Saint	587	71.9	
Liberal Democrats	Matthew Booth	229	28.1	
Majority		358	43.8	
Turnout		816		

Vale of the Red Horse
Party	Candidate	Votes	%	±%
Conservative	Christopher Pilkington	614	72.7	
Liberal Democrats	Rosemary Ratcliffe	230	27.3	
Majority		384	45.4	
Turnout		844		

Welford
Party	Candidate	Votes	%	±%
Liberal Democrats	Peter Barnes	682	74.8	
Conservative	Henry Cottam	230	25.2	
Majority		452	49.6	
Turnout		912		

Wellesbourne (3)
Party	Candidate	Votes	%	±%
Independent	Roger Wright	1,529		
Liberal Democrats	Priscilla Cook	895		
Independent	Philip Coton	719		
Liberal Democrats	Patricia Williams	699		
Conservative	Edward Duckworth	649		
Conservative	Richard Kingston	563		
Independent	David Morris	427		
Green	Michael Davies	358		
Turnout		5,839		
