= 2002 Worcester City Council election =

2002 UK local government election

The 2002 Worcester City Council election took place on 2 May 2002 to elect members of Worcester City Council in Worcestershire, England. One third of the council was up for election and the council stayed under no overall control.

After the election, the composition of the council was:

- Conservative 18
- Labour 12
- Independent 5
- Liberal Democrat 1

== Campaign ==
Before the election no party had a majority, but the Conservatives provided the leader of the council after gaining 5 seats in the 2000 election. Both the Conservatives and Labour had 15 seats, along with 5 independents and 1 Liberal Democrat. The election saw 12 seats being contested with Labour defending 7, the Conservatives 3 and the Liberal Democrats and independents 1 each. Labour only contested 11 of the seats after their candidate in Claines ward was dropped by the party over a letter he wrote to the local paper.

== Election result ==
The results saw Worcester remain a hung council but with the Conservatives becoming clearly the largest party. They gained 3 seats from Labour in All Saints, St Clement and St Martin wards.

Worcester local election result 2002
Party	Seats	Gains	Losses	Net gain/loss	Seats %	Votes %	Votes	+/−
Conservative	6	3	0	+3	50.0	44.4	9,857	
Labour	4	0	3	-3	33.3	38.1	8,455	
Liberal Democrats	1	0	0	0	8.3	11.5	2,545	
Independent	1	0	0	0	8.3	6.0	1,330	

== Ward results ==
All Saints
Party	Candidate	Votes	%	±%
Conservative	Mohammed Altaf	956	56.8	
Labour	Nazrul Islam	726	43.2	
Majority		230	13.6	
Turnout		1,682		
Conservative gain from Labour		Swing		

Bedwardine
Party	Candidate	Votes	%	±%
Conservative	Derek Prodger	1,093	59.8	
Labour	David Candler	521	28.5	
Liberal Democrats	Iain MacBriar	213	11.7	
Majority		572	31.3	
Turnout		1,827		
Conservative hold		Swing		

Claines
Party	Candidate	Votes	%	±%
Liberal Democrats	Susan Askin	1,465	58.2	
Conservative	William Elsy	1,051	41.8	
Majority		414	16.4	
Turnout		2,516		
Liberal Democrats hold		Swing		

Holy Trinity
Party	Candidate	Votes	%	±%
Labour	Roger Berry	555	57.5	
Conservative	Lucy Hodgson	256	26.5	
Independent	Adrian Hughes	155	16.0	
Majority		299	31.0	
Turnout		966		
Labour hold		Swing		

Nunnery
Party	Candidate	Votes	%	±%
Independent	Michael Francis	749	44.9	
Labour	Dawn-Marie Turner	665	39.9	
Conservative	Gerard Francomb	253	15.2	
Majority		84	5.0	
Turnout		1,667		
Independent hold		Swing		

St Barnabas
Party	Candidate	Votes	%	±%
Labour	David Barlow	696	79.2	
Conservative	Mumtaz Ali	183	20.8	
Majority		513	58.4	
Turnout		879		
Labour hold		Swing		

St Clement
Party	Candidate	Votes	%	±%
Conservative	Barry MacKenzie-Williams	1,034	50.1	
Labour	Andrew Watson	1,029	49.9	
Majority		5	0.2	
Turnout		2,063		
Conservative gain from Labour		Swing		

St John
Party	Candidate	Votes	%	±%
Labour	Marc Baylis	805	52.5	
Independent	Colin Layland	426	27.8	
Conservative	Colin Phillips	302	19.7	
Majority		379	24.7	
Turnout		1,533		
Labour hold		Swing		

St Martin
Party	Candidate	Votes	%	±%
Conservative	Ian Imray	1,504	51.3	
Labour	June Tyler	1,429	48.7	
Majority		75	2.6	
Turnout		2,933		
Conservative gain from Labour		Swing		

St Nicholas
Party	Candidate	Votes	%	±%
Labour	Raymond Turner	899	54.9	
Conservative	David Tibbutt	739	45.1	
Majority		160	9.8	
Turnout		1,638		
Labour hold		Swing		

St Peter
Party	Candidate	Votes	%	±%
Conservative	Frank Tarbuck	1,412	51.7	
Labour	Pauline Smith	759	27.8	
Liberal Democrats	Paul Griffiths	560	20.5	
Majority		653	23.9	
Turnout		2,731		
Conservative hold		Swing		

St Stephen
Party	Candidate	Votes	%	±%
Conservative	Gareth Jones	1,074	61.3	
Labour	Ali Asghar	371	21.2	
Liberal Democrats	Elizabeth Smith	307	17.5	
Majority		703	40.1	
Turnout		1,752		
Conservative hold		Swing		
