= 2002 California lieutenant gubernatorial election =

- November 5, 2002
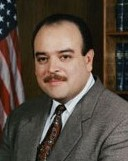

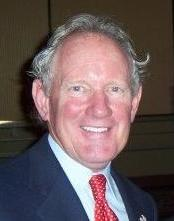
Nominee	Cruz Bustamante	Bruce McPherson
Party	Democratic	Republican
Popular vote	3,589,804	3,031,571
Percentage	49.42%	41.74%
- County results Bustamante: 40–50% 50–60% 60–70% McPherson: 40–50% 50–60% 60–70%
Lt. Governor before election
Cruz Bustamante
Democratic
Elected Lt. Governor
Cruz Bustamante
Democratic

The 2002 California lieutenant gubernatorial election occurred on November 5, 2002. The primary elections took place on March 5, 2002. The Democratic incumbent, Cruz Bustamante, defeated the Republican nominee, State Senator Bruce McPherson.

== Primary results ==
A bar graph of statewide results in this contest are available at https://web.archive.org/web/20080905210433/http://primary2002.ss.ca.gov/Returns/ltg/00.htm.

Results by county are available at https://web.archive.org/web/20080905210433/http://primary2002.ss.ca.gov/Returns/ltg/00.htm#cty.

=== Democratic ===
California Lt. Governor Democratic primary, 2002
Candidate	Votes	%
Cruz Bustamante	1,937,213	99.97
Ronald J. Like	24,543	0.03
Total votes	2,141,756	100.00

=== Republican ===
California Lt. Governor Republican primary, 2002
Candidate	Votes	%
Bruce McPherson	1,836,144	86.22
Ellie Michaels	293,283	13.77
Ronald J. Like	1,119	0.01
Total votes	2,130,546	100.00

=== Others ===
California Lt. Governor primary, 2002 (Others)
Party	Candidate	Votes	%
Green	Donna Warren	35,847	100.00
American Independent	Jim King	25,250	100.00
Libertarian	Pat Wright	18,506	100.00
Reform	Paul Jerry Hannosh	7,440	100.00
Natural Law	Kaylee Przybylak	4,143	100.00

== General election results ==
Final results from the Secretary of State of California:

2002 Lieutenant Governor of California election
Party	Candidate	Votes	%
Democratic	Cruz Bustamante (incumbent)	3,589,804	49.42%
Republican	Bruce McPherson	3,031,571	41.74%
Green	Donna Warren	298,951	4.12%
Libertarian	Pat Wright	104,920	1.44%
American Independent	Jim King	91,015	1.25%
Reform	Paul Jerry Hanosh	80,307	1.11%
Natural Law	Kalee Przybylak	66,847	0.92%
Invalid or blank votes		475,406	6.14%
Total votes		7,263,415	100.00%
Turnout			36.05%
Democratic hold			

=== Results by county ===
Results from the Secretary of State of California:

County	Bustamante	Votes	McPherson	Votes	Warren	Votes	Others	Votes
San Francisco	65.82%	136,416	16.47%	34,133	14.00%	29,019	3.71%	7,690
Alameda	64.72%	217,350	23.07%	77,471	8.26%	27,734	3.96%	13,294
Marin	59.89%	53,109	28.84%	25,574	7.94%	7,042	3.34%	2,959
Los Angeles	58.81%	987,483	33.20%	557,459	3.39%	56,954	4.60%	77,287
San Mateo	58.13%	98,704	31.28%	53,106	6.16%	10,460	4.43%	7,515
Imperial	57.58%	12,501	35.99%	7,813	1.88%	408	4.55%	988
Sonoma	54.79%	79,691	30.70%	44,655	9.04%	13,147	5.46%	7,948
Solano	54.03%	47,592	37.61%	33,134	3.34%	2,939	5.02%	4,426
Santa Clara	53.58%	191,160	37.44%	133,565	4.15%	14,820	4.83%	17,246
Contra Costa	53.40%	141,285	38.00%	100,540	4.46%	11,804	4.14%	10,948
Napa	52.65%	19,357	36.95%	13,586	4.91%	1,807	5.49%	2,017
Yolo	52.16%	24,231	36.97%	17,176	6.72%	3,122	4.15%	1,926
Merced	50.46%	20,444	43.60%	17,665	1.86%	752	4.09%	1,656
Lake	49.95%	7,974	39.75%	6,346	4.80%	767	5.49%	876
Humboldt	49.29%	20,934	33.05%	14,036	11.83%	5,024	5.84%	2,479
Mendocino	48.71%	12,004	31.76%	7,827	13.12%	3,234	6.41%	1,579
Santa Barbara	47.42%	53,654	43.60%	49,325	4.60%	5,204	4.38%	4,957
San Joaquin	47.09%	58,151	45.62%	56,336	2.86%	3,527	4.43%	5,467
Stanislaus	46.18%	44,395	46.56%	44,754	2.50%	2,408	4.76%	4,571
Sacramento	45.97%	145,687	45.27%	143,475	4.20%	13,307	4.57%	14,476
San Benito	45.89%	5,728	48.14%	6,009	2.41%	301	3.56%	445
Alpine	45.64%	251	41.64%	229	5.27%	29	7.45%	41
Fresno	45.48%	71,224	49.46%	77,456	2.02%	3,164	3.03%	4,747
Monterey	44.25%	38,863	49.70%	43,649	2.82%	2,481	3.23%	2,835
Ventura	44.11%	85,236	47.57%	91,924	3.18%	6,146	5.14%	9,929
Del Norte	43.81%	2,950	44.87%	3,021	4.19%	282	7.13%	480
San Bernardino	43.82%	123,250	47.62%	133,951	2.49%	7,009	6.07%	17,080
Kings	43.78%	9,330	51.52%	10,979	1.32%	282	3.37%	718
Riverside	42.63%	128,664	50.45%	152,248	2.02%	6,087	4.90%	14,784
San Diego	42.24%	273,966	50.18%	325,521	2.82%	18,315	4.76%	30,855
Santa Cruz	41.82%	32,917	46.34%	36,473	8.15%	6,414	3.68%	2,898
San Luis Obispo	41.33%	33,642	49.01%	39,893	4.87%	3,964	4.79%	3,897
Tuolumne	40.97%	7,383	50.08%	9,025	3.73%	672	5.23%	942
Trinity	40.75%	1,970	44.97%	2,174	5.83%	282	8.44%	408
Tulare	40.25%	25,320	54.43%	34,242	1.61%	1,014	3.71%	2,337
Kern	39.70%	54,427	54.21%	74,328	1.69%	2,312	4.41%	6,040
Amador	39.28%	5,097	51.84%	6,727	3.44%	446	5.44%	706
Tehama	38.57%	5,943	52.89%	8,150	2.37%	365	6.17%	950
Mono	38.30%	1,134	49.98%	1,480	5.61%	166	6.11%	181
Butte	38.16%	23,302	49.72%	30,362	6.64%	4,054	5.49%	3,351
Madera	37.68%	9,918	55.93%	14,722	1.91%	503	4.48%	1,179
Calaveras	37.55%	5,718	51.12%	7,785	4.68%	712	6.66%	1,014
Plumas	37.08%	2,897	52.07%	4,068	4.10%	320	6.75%	527
Mariposa	36.63%	2,350	53.51%	3,433	3.57%	229	6.30%	404
Nevada	36.44%	14,287	51.73%	20,284	6.93%	2,719	4.89%	1,918
Lassen	36.00%	2,760	53.55%	4,106	2.40%	184	8.05%	617
Sierra	35.64%	510	51.64%	739	3.98%	57	8.74%	125
Shasta	35.60%	17,278	55.68%	27,027	2.35%	1,142	6.37%	3,093
Orange	35.40%	226,411	56.15%	359,139	2.60%	16,633	5.85%	37,385
Yuba	34.67%	4,000	55.45%	6,398	3.50%	404	6.38%	736
Inyo	34.66%	2,172	55.67%	3,489	3.80%	238	5.87%	368
Siskiyou	34.66%	5,344	54.53%	8,407	3.29%	507	7.52%	1,159
El Dorado	34.04%	18,973	56.78%	31,650	4.34%	2,422	4.84%	2,700
Glenn	33.98%	2,211	59.36%	3,862	1.84%	120	4.81%	313
Placer	33.70%	32,582	59.09%	57,128	3.34%	3,232	3.87%	3,739
Sutter	33.15%	6,365	60.13%	11,545	2.12%	407	4.60%	883
Colusa	32.72%	1,487	60.70%	2,759	1.78%	81	4.80%	218
Modoc	28.75%	960	60.92%	2,034	2.40%	80	7.94%	265

== See also ==
- 2002 California elections
- State of California
- Lieutenant Governor of California
- List of lieutenant governors of California
