= 2002 Pennsylvania lieutenant gubernatorial election =

The Pennsylvania lieutenant gubernatorial election of 2002 was held on November 5, 2002. In Pennsylvania, the Lieutenant Governor is elected on the same ticket as the Governor, so the only campaign for this office was the primary election.

== Democratic primary ==
=== Candidates ===
- John Lawless, State Representative (from Lower Providence Township)
- Thaddeus Kirkland, State Representative (from Chester)
- Catherine Baker Knoll, former State Treasurer (from McKees Rocks)
- Allen Kukovich, State Senator (from Manor)
- Ron Panza, Green Tree Borough Council President
- Ed Truax
- Jack Wagner, State Senator (from Pittsburgh)
- Ron Williams
- David Woodard

Pennsylvania Lt. Governor primary election, 2002
| Party | Candidate | Votes | % |
|---|---|---|---|
| Democratic | Catherine Baker Knoll | 264,528 | 25.4 |
| Democratic | Jack Wagner | 233,680 | 22.4 |
| Democratic | Allen Kukovich | 213,070 | 20.4 |
| Democratic | John Lawless | 97,231 | 9.3 |
| Democratic | Thaddeus Kirkland | 81,092 | 7.8 |
| Democratic | Ron Panza | 78,389 | 7.5 |
| Democratic | Ron Williams | 38,984 | 3.7 |
| Democratic | Edward C. Truax | 22,754 | 2.2 |
| Democratic | J. David Woodard | 13,198 | 1.3 |

Catherine Baker Knoll won a narrow and surprising victory to become Rendell's running mate. Jack Wanger, a State Senator from Pittsburgh, was the choice candidate of the party establishment. However, Allen Kukovich, a fellow senator from a Pittsburgh exurb, launched a vocal challenge to Wagner, that opened an ideological split within the party. Wagner ran as a traditional moderate with strong union ties, while Kukovich portrayed himself as a liberal. Knoll, a long time fixture in state politics, took advantage of the split and, using her strong support among women and senior citizens, scored an upset win.

== Republican primary ==
Jane Earll, a State Senator from Erie was unopposed for the Republican nomination and thus became Fisher's running mate.

== See also ==
- Pennsylvania gubernatorial election, 2002
