= 1999 Micronesian referendum =

A four-part referendum was held in the Federated States of Micronesia on 1 July 1999. Voters were asked whether a constitutional convention should be called, whether they approved of a proposal on the distribution of revenues from the country's exclusive economic zone (EEZ), whether the amount of tax revenues distributed to the states should rise from 50% to 70%, and whether states should be given exclusive ownership of their natural resources. The latter three had originally been planned to be held alongside the parliamentary elections in March, but were postponed due to a lack of funds to print the ballot papers.

The referendum on holding a Constitutional Convention was held in accordance with Chapter XIV, Article 2 of the Constitution, which required a referendum every 10 years on convening a Convention. It required only a simple majority in favour. The other three referendums were all popular initiatives, and required 75% of voters to vote in favour in at least three of the four states.

The question on the EEZ proposed inserting a new article 23 in Chapter IX of the constitution:

The gross revenue derived from the living resources in the exclusive economic zone shall be divided equally between the national government and the state governments.

The question on natural resources proposed inserting a new article 2 to Chapter I:

Each State has the sovereign ownership over the natural resources within its boundaries, pursuant to each state's constitution, including the exclusive economic zone surrounding its islands.

== Results ==
The proposal to hold a Constitutional Convention was approved by voters, whilst the other three proposals were rejected.
