= 2002 Shreveport mayoral election =

- October 5, 2002
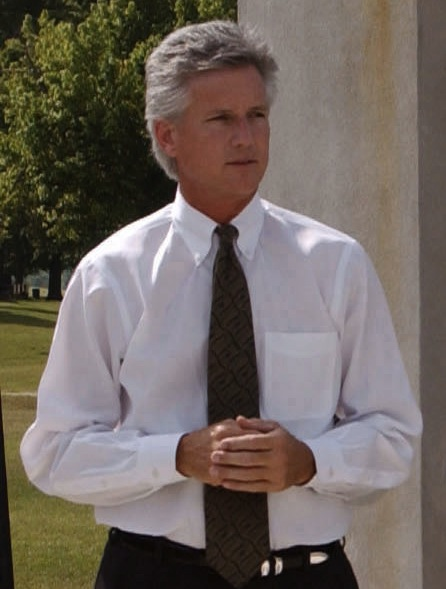

Candidate	Keith Hightower	Vernon Adams
Party	Democratic	Republican
Popular vote	31,084	10,620
Percentage	74.53%	25.47%
Mayor before election
Keith Hightower
Democratic
Elected mayor
Keith Hightower
Democratic

The 2002 Shreveport mayoral election resulted in the re-election of Democrat Keith Hightower who defeated Republican Vernon Adams by a large margin in the election of October 5, 2002. As Hightower won a simple majority in this round, no run-off election was held.

== Results ==
2002 Mayor of Shreveport primary election
Party	Candidate	Votes	%
Democratic	Keith Hightower	31,084	74.53%
Republican	Vernon Adams	10,620	25.47%
Total votes		41,704	100%
