= 2002 Nagorno-Karabakh presidential election =

Presidential elections were held in the Nagorno-Karabakh Republic on 11 August 2002. The result was a victory for incumbent President Arkadi Ghukasyan, who received 89% of the vote.

== Results ==
Candidate	Party	Votes	%
Arkadi Ghukasyan	Independent	53,746	88.96
Arthur Tovmasyan	Independent	4,637	7.67
Albert Ghazaryan	Christian Democratic Party	1,271	2.10
Grigory Afanasyan	Unity	763	1.26
Total		60,417	100.00
Valid votes		60,417	93.33
Invalid/blank votes		4,319	6.67
Total votes		64,736	100.00
Registered voters/turnout		85,523	75.69
Source: CEC
