= 2002 Long Beach, California, mayoral election =

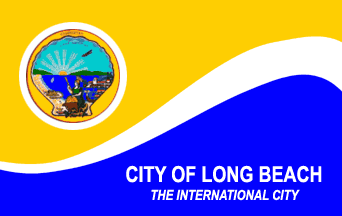
- April 9, 2002 (first round); June 4, 2002 (runoff)
Candidate	Beverly O'Neill	Dan Baker
Party	Nonpartisan	Nonpartisan
First-round vote	11,032	9,628
First-round percentage	28.3%	24.7%
Second-round vote	unknown	15,173
Second-round percentage	unknown%	36.7%
Candidate	Norm Ryan	Ray Grabinski
Party	Nonpartisan	Nonpartisan
First-round vote	8,909	7,490
First-round percentage	22.8%	19.2%
Mayor before election
Beverly O'Neill
Nonpartisan
Elected mayor
Beverly O'Neill
Nonpartisan

Long Beach, California, held an election for mayor on April 9, 2002 and June 4, 2002. It saw the reelection of Beverly O'Neill to an unprecedented third term. O'Neill had to run as a write-in, as she was otherwise term limited. In the runoff she faced city councilman Dan Baker and write-in Norm Ryan.

== Candidates ==
- Dan Baker, Long Beach city councilman
- Ray Grabinski, 7th District Long Beach city councilman and candidate for mayor in 1994
- Bob Livingstone
- Beverly O'Neill, incumbent mayor, term-limited (therefore running as a write-in)
- Norm Ryan, former city council candidate
- John Stolpe
- David P. Wong

== Results ==
=== First round ===
First round results
Candidate	Votes	%
Beverly O'Neill (incumbent) write-in	11,032	28.3
Dan Baker	9,628	24.7
Norm Ryan	8,909	22.8
Ray Grabinski	7,490	19.2
John Stolpe	751	1.9
David P. Wong	625	1.6
Bob Livingstone	539	1.3
Total votes		

=== Runoff ===
Runoff results
Candidate	Votes	%
Write-ins (including Beverly O'Neill and Norm Ryan)	26,130	63.2
Dan Baker	15,173	36.7
