= 2002 California Superintendent of Public Instruction election =

- March 5, 2002 (primary); November 5, 2002 (runoff)
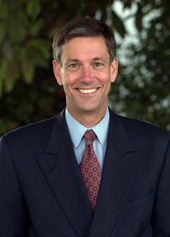

Nominee	Jack O'Connell	Katherine H. Smith	Lynne Leach
Party	Democratic	Nonpartisan	Republican
Popular vote	1,756,762	1,177,783	1,101,489
Percentage	31.41%	21.06%	19.69%
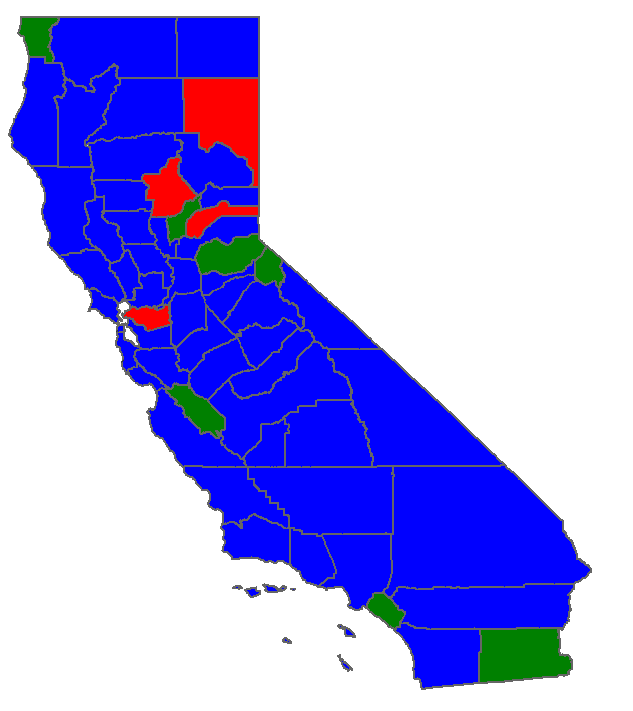
- Election results by county Jack O'Connell Katherine H. Smith Lynne Leach
SPI before election
Delaine Eastin
Democratic
Elected SPI
Jack O'Connell
Democratic

The 2002 California Superintendent of Public Instruction election occurred on March 5, 2002. Jack O'Connell, defeated Katherine H. Smith in a runoff on November 5, 2002 to replace Delaine Eastin.

== Results ==
California Superintendent of Public Instruction election, 2002
Candidate	Votes	%
Jack O'Connell	1,756,762	31.41
Katherine H. Smith	1,177,783	21.06
Lynne Leach	1,101,489	19.69
Joe Taylor	157,736	2.82
Total votes	5,593,770	100.00
Turnout	{{{votes}}}	26.01%

=== Results by county ===
County	O'Connell	Votes	Smith	Votes	Leach	Votes	Taylor	Votes
Santa Barbara	68.88%	47,266	18.79%	12,897	10.25%	7,032	2.08%	1,425
San Luis Obispo	68.51%	37,311	18.31%	9,969	11.25%	6,126	1.93%	1,053
Ventura	60.44%	68,269	19.02%	21,482	18.14%	20,491	2.40%	2,714
San Francisco	56.55%	57,731	14.56%	14,861	26.61%	27,166	2.28%	2,324
Marin	49.09%	24,314	22.28%	11,038	26.20%	12,979	2.43%	1,202
Alameda	46.66%	83,084	25.78%	45,895	24.31%	43,278	3.25%	5,788
Colusa	45.61%	1,733	25.84%	982	24.42%	928	4.13%	157
Los Angeles	45.45%	374,729	22.20%	182,991	27.62%	227,714	4.73%	38,963
San Mateo	45.39%	42,658	23.21%	21,815	28.22%	26,516	3.18%	2,985
Lake	43.02%	4,434	22.52%	2,321	30.70%	3,165	3.76%	388
Mendocino	42.74%	6,128	25.03%	3,589	28.52%	4,089	3.70%	531
Sacramento	42.51%	76,943	27.23%	49,282	26.76%	48,423	3.50%	6,336
Humboldt	42.27%	11,363	22.15%	5,954	32.04%	8,615	3.54%	953
Yolo	42.08%	12,232	23.78%	6,913	30.81%	8,956	3.33%	968
Santa Clara	41.91%	78,857	26.17%	49,242	28.64%	53,890	3.28%	6,179
Fresno	41.74%	41,555	25.47%	25,362	28.17%	28,045	4.62%	4,604
Merced	41.42%	10,478	20.85%	5,275	33.74%	8,536	3.98%	1,008
Madera	41.13%	6,862	26.98%	4,501	28.12%	4,691	3.77%	629
Mariposa	40.95%	1,993	25.44%	1,238	30.33%	1,476	3.29%	160
Sonoma	40.90%	39,111	27.26%	26,068	28.64%	27,387	3.20%	3,056
San Joaquin	40.88%	32,605	28.67%	22,865	26.26%	20,943	4.20%	3,351
Santa Cruz	40.88%	19,641	29.34%	14,095	27.23%	13,080	2.55%	1,225
Glenn	40.19%	1,824	27.32%	1,240	26.29%	1,193	6.19%	281
Stanislaus	40.18%	25,000	25.79%	16,045	29.65%	18,446	4.39%	2,730
Tehama	40.04%	4,917	23.43%	2,878	29.99%	3,683	6.54%	803
Napa	39.91%	9,217	28.50%	6,581	28.31%	6,538	3.28%	758
Solano	39.44%	20,153	27.02%	13,807	29.45%	15,047	4.09%	2,090
Tuolumne	39.23%	4,828	30.22%	3,720	27.28%	3,358	3.27%	402
San Bernardino	38.97%	56,909	26.06%	38,050	31.09%	45,394	3.89%	5,678
Riverside	38.67%	61,317	23.76%	37,673	33.98%	53,882	3.60%	5,707
Inyo	38.68%	1,888	23.83%	1,163	33.54%	1,637	3.95%	193
Calaveras	38.66%	4,379	29.76%	3,371	28.07%	3,180	3.50%	397
San Diego	38.51%	134,789	29.77%	104,183	28.11%	98,397	3.61%	12,644
Mono	37.60%	746	23.34%	463	36.90%	732	2.17%	43
Kings	37.57%	4,812	24.22%	3,102	31.55%	4,041	6.65%	852
Trinity	37.49%	1,465	28.45%	1,112	28.53%	1,115	5.53%	216
Amador	37.50%	3,224	28.10%	2,416	30.23%	2,599	4.18%	359
Placer	37.09%	21,620	31.16%	18,165	28.50%	16,612	3.24%	1,890
Shasta	37.03%	11,588	28.33%	8,864	29.12%	9,111	5.52%	1,727
Tulare	36.98%	15,519	30.35%	12,737	27.91%	11,711	4.75%	1,994
Monterey	36.87%	19,150	28.06%	14,575	31.00%	16,104	4.07%	2,116
Sierra	36.57%	445	30.24%	368	29.50%	359	3.70%	45
San Benito	35.16%	2,880	22.48%	1,841	39.08%	3,201	3.27%	268
Plumas	35.05%	2,138	32.35%	1,973	30.05%	1,833	2.54%	155
Alpine	34.75%	147	24.35%	103	38.30%	162	2.60%	11
Modoc	34.80%	973	30.87%	863	28.86%	807	5.47%	153
Sutter	34.16%	4,300	32.16%	4,048	28.08%	3,534	5.59%	704
Butte	33.77%	14,664	34.92%	15,160	27.69%	12,021	3.62%	1,573
Kern	33.48%	31,289	29.19%	27,280	32.87%	30,716	4.47%	4,174
Contra Costa	33.37%	53,763	46.01%	74,130	18.05%	29,090	2.57%	4,138
Del Norte	32.93%	1,652	24.64%	1,236	38.94%	1,953	3.49%	175
Siskiyou	32.50%	3,457	30.87%	3,284	31.88%	3,391	4.75%	505
El Dorado	32.47%	11,660	30.29%	10,878	33.38%	11,987	3.86%	1,386
Orange	32.13%	128,998	28.66%	115,088	35.55%	142,723	3.66%	14,708
Nevada	31.50%	7,932	34.18%	8,607	30.42%	7,660	3.90%	982
Lassen	31.47%	2,145	32.55%	2,218	32.21%	2,195	3.77%	257
Yuba	31.11%	2,785	31.93%	2,859	32.54%	2,913	4.42%	396
Imperial	30.92%	4,892	17.52%	2,773	43.81%	6,932	7.75%	1,227

== See also ==
- California state elections, 2002
- State of California
- California Department of Education
