= 2002 Hull City Council election =

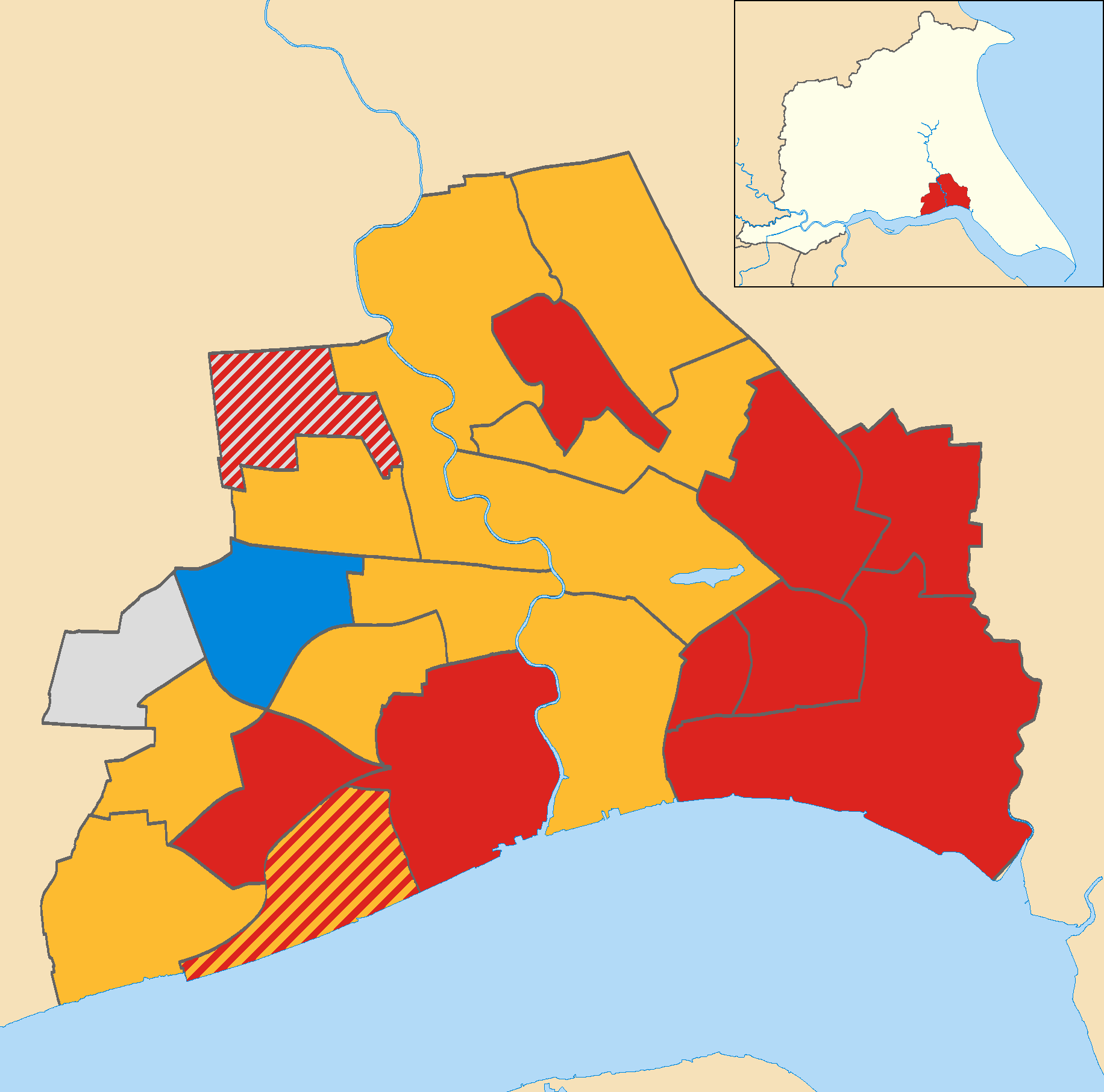
Map of the results of the 2002 Hull council election. Labour in red, Liberal Democrats in yellow, Conservatives in blue, Independents in light grey.

The 2002 Hull City Council election took place on 2 May 2002 to elect members of Hull City Council in England. The whole council was up for election with boundary changes since the last election in 2000 reducing the number of seats by 1. The Labour Party lost overall control of the council to no overall control.

== Campaign ==
Hull was seen as one of the key contests in the 2002 local elections with the Liberal Democrats seen as the main challengers to Labour. Labour had run Hull continuously since 1945, apart from a brief period from 1969 to 1971 when the Conservatives had taken control, but they were seen as vulnerable in this election. As well as the Liberal Democrats, who with 10 seats were the main opposition before the election, the Conservatives stood in 31 of the 59 seats that were being contested. Divisions within the local Labour party also meant some councillors stood in the election as independents.

The Labour administration received criticism from the opposition and by the district auditor for the poor quality of services provided in Hull. The opposition also attacked Labour for their use of the £255 million recently gained by Hull council after the part sale of Kingston Communications.

== Election result ==
The results saw the Liberal Democrats become the largest party on the council with Labour falling from 44 seats before the election to only 24 afterwards.

Hull local election result 2002
Party	Seats	Gains	Losses	Net gain/loss	Seats %	Votes %	Votes	+/−
Liberal Democrats	29			+19	49.2	46.1	51,802	
Labour	24			-20	40.7	39.1	43,957	
Independent	4			0	6.8	6.3	7,131	
Conservative	2			0	3.4	7.1	8,015	
Green	0			0	0.0	0.7	789	
UKIP	0			0	0.0	0.3	377	
Socialist Alternative	0			0	0.0	0.2	208	
Socialist Alliance	0			0	0.0	0.1	153	

== Ward results ==
Avenue (3)
Party	Candidate	Votes	%	±%
Liberal Democrats	Simone Butterworth	1,670		
Liberal Democrats	John Robinson	1,441		
Liberal Democrats	David Woods	1,421		
Labour	Glennis Lee	962		
Labour	Nicholas Robinson	874		
Labour	Brian Wadforth	715		
Green	Louise Muston	361		
Green	Raymond Atkin	281		
Socialist Alternative	Ernest Roustoby	208		
Conservative	Patrick Belding	189		
Conservative	Basil Bulmer	186		
Conservative	Sheila Airey	169		
Turnout		8,477		

Beverley (2)
Party	Candidate	Votes	%	±%
Liberal Democrats	Geraldine Gough	1,524		
Liberal Democrats	David McCobb	1,510		
Labour	Gordon Caselton	640		
Labour	David Stevens	565		
Conservative	John Abbot	395		
Conservative	Andrew Forster	380		
Turnout		5,014		

Boothferry (3)
Party	Candidate	Votes	%	±%
Liberal Democrats	Patricia Ellis	1,591		
Liberal Democrats	Keith Toon	1,488		
Liberal Democrats	Karen Woods	1,468		
Labour	Michael Whiting	851		
Labour	Roy Windle	798		
Labour	Charles Glover	784		
Conservative	Diane Bradley	364		
Conservative	Kathleen Percy	300		
Conservative	Jonathan Fry	287		
Turnout		7,931		

Bransholme East (2)
Party	Candidate	Votes	%	±%
Liberal Democrats	Nadene Burton	1,981		
Liberal Democrats	Anita Harrison	1,004		
Labour	Harold Neilson	459		
Labour	Harry Woodford	440		
Conservative	Jean Fenwick	37		
Conservative	Janet Baxter	34		
Turnout		3,955		

Bransholme West
Party	Candidate	Votes	%	±%
Labour	Leonard Bird	663	62.0	
Liberal Democrats	Robert Harrison	312	29.2	
Socialist Alliance	Patricia Cain-Penrose	94	8.8	
Majority		351	32.8	
Turnout		1,069		

Bricknell (2)
Party	Candidate	Votes	%	±%
Conservative	John Fareham	1,436		
Conservative	Andrew Percy	1,341		
Liberal Democrats	Garry Oglesby	841		
Liberal Democrats	Richard Welton	779		
Labour	Susan Wiley	500		
Labour	Andrew Dorton	485		
Turnout		5,382		

Derringham (3)
Party	Candidate	Votes	%	±%
Independent	Chris Jarvis	1,320		
Independent	John Considine	1,128		
Independent	Clare Page	996		
Labour	Brian Wilkinson	753		
Labour	John Shipley	703		
Labour	Kay Vandenbriele	664		
UKIP	John Cornforth	279		
Liberal Democrats	David Green	228		
Liberal Democrats	Bridget Kelly	185		
Liberal Democrats	Philip Evans	174		
Conservative	Peter White	167		
Conservative	Zena Rowley	157		
Turnout		6,754		

Drypool (3)
Party	Candidate	Votes	%	±%
Liberal Democrats	Janet Toker	1,683		
Liberal Democrats	Michael Kemp	1,540		
Liberal Democrats	Maureen Obridge	1,534		
Labour	Nellie Stephenson	912		
Labour	John Shields	874		
Labour	Brian Smelt	874		
Turnout		7,417		

Holderness (3)
Party	Candidate	Votes	%	±%
Liberal Democrats	Stephen Baker	1,753		
Liberal Democrats	John Nicholson	1,662		
Liberal Democrats	Katharine Hancock	1,642		
Labour	James Mulgrove	926		
Labour	John Ranby	767		
Labour	Neil Perkins	743		
Conservative	Albert Greendale	271		
Turnout		7,764		

Ings (3)
Party	Candidate	Votes	%	±%
Labour	Peter Clark	1,139		
Labour	Garry White	1,110		
Labour	Brian Petch	1,071		
Liberal Democrats	James Morrell	902		
Liberal Democrats	George Taylor	881		
Liberal Democrats	Mervyn Taylor	830		
Turnout		5,933		

Kings Park (2)
Party	Candidate	Votes	%	±%
Liberal Democrats	Elaine Garland	998		
Liberal Democrats	Carl Minns	867		
Labour	William Haughey	397		
Labour	John Nicholson	335		
Conservative	Wayne Hanson	53		
Conservative	David Whellan	38		
Turnout		2,688		

Longhill (3)
Party	Candidate	Votes	%	±%
Labour	Alice Hewitt	1,081		
Labour	Ann Stanley	1,038		
Labour	John Black	975		
Liberal Democrats	Christine Watkinson	705		
Liberal Democrats	Anthony Holdstock	644		
Liberal Democrats	Philip Wilcox	568		
Independent	Peter Martin	228		
Independent	Barrie Goforth	129		
Turnout		5,368		

Marfleet (3)
Party	Candidate	Votes	%	±%
Labour	Norman Kendrew	1,057		
Labour	Sheila Waudby	921		
Labour	Brenda Petch	843		
Liberal Democrats	Allen Healand	428		
Liberal Democrats	Pauline Dibnah	414		
Liberal Democrats	Angela Kay	375		
Turnout		4,038		

Myton (3)
Party	Candidate	Votes	%	±%
Labour	Kenneth Branson	1,167		
Labour	Daren Hale	1,102		
Labour	Colin Inglis	1,079		
Liberal Democrats	Mirian Benson	470		
Liberal Democrats	Rosemary Turner	353		
Liberal Democrats	Anthony Sloan	338		
Conservative	Richard McConnell	233		
Turnout		4,742		

Newington (3)
Party	Candidate	Votes	%	±%
Labour	Bryan Bradley	623		
Labour	Katrina Peat	595		
Labour	Kathryn Lavery	577		
Independent	David Harris	394		
Independent	Ivor Davies	343		
Independent	George Harker	305		
Liberal Democrats	Beverley Whiting	241		
Liberal Democrats	Michael Wrigley	239		
Liberal Democrats	Wendy Wrigley	221		
Conservative	Reginald Britton	139		
Conservative	David Thompson	108		
Turnout		3,785		

Newland (2)
Party	Candidate	Votes	%	±%
Liberal Democrats	Michael Ross	1,013		
Liberal Democrats	Mark Collinson	1,008		
Labour	Daniel Brown	548		
Labour	Patrick Walker	482		
Green	James Russell	147		
Conservative	Peter Caswell	134		
Conservative	Ramesh Chhabra	101		
Turnout		3,433		

Orchard Park and Greenwood (3)
Party	Candidate	Votes	%	±%
Independent	Terence Geraghty	900		
Labour	Steven Bayes	822		
Labour	Trevor Larsen	771		
Independent	Tony Fee	721		
Labour	David Playle	672		
Independent	Louis Barron	609		
Liberal Democrats	Andrew Brown	336		
Liberal Democrats	Janet Whiting	253		
Turnout		5,084		

Pickering (3)
Party	Candidate	Votes	%	±%
Liberal Democrats	Angela Wastling	1,133		
Liberal Democrats	Barry Dibnah	1,063		
Liberal Democrats	Ann Godden	1,031		
Labour	Julie Lowery	1,016		
Labour	Malcolm Fields	966		
Labour	Tracy Windle	964		
Conservative	Colin Baxter	246		
Conservative	Antony Cox	237		
Conservative	John Sharp	229		
Independent	Michael Nash	58		
Turnout		6,943		

St Andrew's (2)
Party	Candidate	Votes	%	±%
Labour	Nadine Fudge	500		
Liberal Democrats	Albert Penna	497		
Labour	Norah Ransford	461		
Liberal Democrats	Florence Toon	447		
Conservative	Robert Cook	81		
Turnout		1,986		

Southcoates East (2)
Party	Candidate	Votes	%	±%
Labour	David Gemmell	697		
Labour	Thomas McVie	651		
Liberal Democrats	Stephen Hull	298		
Liberal Democrats	Arthur Walker	298		
Socialist Alliance	Keith Ellis	59		
Turnout		2,003		

Southcoates West (2)
Party	Candidate	Votes	%	±%
Labour	Stephen Brady	682		
Labour	Mary Glew	543		
Liberal Democrats	Julie Flower	350		
Liberal Democrats	Peter Rossington	340		
Turnout		1,915		

Sutton (3)
Party	Candidate	Votes	%	±%
Liberal Democrats	Paul Hepton	1,641		
Liberal Democrats	Kalvin Neal	1,638		
Liberal Democrats	Tracey Neal	1,628		
Labour	Kenneth Turner	911		
Labour	John Webster	898		
Labour	Nigel Welton	816		
Conservative	Peter Abraham	170		
Conservative	Norman Hall	170		
Conservative	Andrew Dunlin	164		
Turnout		8,036		

University (2)
Party	Candidate	Votes	%	±%
Liberal Democrats	Christine Randall	973		
Liberal Democrats	Chris Randall	950		
Labour	Rodney Evans	658		
Labour	John Stanley	621		
Conservative	Helen Horrobin	101		
Conservative	Stanley Thompson	98		
UKIP	Benjamin Green	49		
UKIP	Tineke Robinson	49		
Turnout		3,499		
