= 2002 Rossendale Borough Council election =

2002 UK local government election

Elections to Rossendale Borough Council were held on 2 May 2002. The whole council was up for election with boundary changes since the last election in 2000. The Labour party took overall control of the council from the Conservative party.

== Election result ==
Rossendale local election result 2002
Party	Seats	Gains	Losses	Net gain/loss	Seats %	Votes %	Votes	+/−
Labour	24			+12	66.7	53.6	23,815	
Conservative	12			-12	33.3	44.7	19,895	
Independent	0			0	0	1.4	614	
Socialist Alliance	0			0	0	0.3	139	

== Ward results ==
Cribden (2)
Party	Candidate	Votes	%	±%
Labour		598		
Labour		501		
Conservative		454		
Conservative		351		
Turnout		1,904		

Eden (2)
Party	Candidate	Votes	%	±%
Conservative		584		
Labour		506		
Conservative		493		
Labour		414		
Turnout		1,997		

Facit and Shawforth (2)
Party	Candidate	Votes	%	±%
Labour		550		
Labour		527		
Conservative		378		
Conservative		290		
Turnout		1,745		

Goodshaw (2)
Party	Candidate	Votes	%	±%
Labour		656		
Labour		644		
Conservative		353		
Conservative		330		
Turnout		1,983		

Greenfield (3)
Party	Candidate	Votes	%	±%
Conservative		835		
Conservative		813		
Conservative		804		
Labour		631		
Labour		591		
Labour		588		
Socialist Alliance		139		
Turnout		4,401		

Greensclough (3)
Party	Candidate	Votes	%	±%
Conservative		1,124		
Conservative		898		
Conservative		825		
Labour		542		
Labour		441		
Labour		434		
Turnout		4,264		

Hareholme (3)
Party	Candidate	Votes	%	±%
Labour		1,041		
Labour		935		
Labour		919		
Conservative		661		
Conservative		601		
Conservative		586		
Turnout		4,743		

Healey and Whitworth (2)
Party	Candidate	Votes	%	±%
Labour		515		
Labour		450		
Conservative		306		
Conservative		224		
Turnout		1,495		

Helmshore (3)
Party	Candidate	Votes	%	±%
Conservative		763		
Conservative		748		
Labour		716		
Labour		714		
Conservative		666		
Labour		627		
Independent		405		
Turnout		4,743		

Irwell (3)
Party	Candidate	Votes	%	±%
Conservative		632		
Conservative		630		
Conservative		563		
Labour		560		
Labour		501		
Labour		479		
Turnout		3,365		

Longholme (3)
Party	Candidate	Votes	%	±%
Labour		896		
Labour		789		
Labour		775		
Conservative		524		
Conservative		510		
Conservative		389		
Turnout		3,883		

Stacksteads (2)
Party	Candidate	Votes	%	±%
Labour		796		
Labour		684		
Conservative		369		
Conservative		298		
Turnout		2,147		

Whitewell (3)
Party	Candidate	Votes	%	±%
Labour		851		
Labour		830		
Labour		801		
Conservative		715		
Conservative		691		
Conservative		690		
Turnout		4,578		

Worsley (3)
Party	Candidate	Votes	%	±%
Labour		836		
Labour		757		
Labour		720		
Conservative		555		
Conservative		534		
Conservative		513		
Independent		209		
Turnout		4,124		
