= 2002 New York state elections =

- November 5, 2002

New York held various elections on November 5, 2002.

== Federal ==
=== United States House ===
New York lost 2 seats following congressional apportionment.

== State ==
In the period 1984 to 2002, competition in New York state campaigns drastically reduced, while campaign spending for Assembly candidates rose from $22,625 in 1984 to an average of $108,625 in 2002, and State Senate candidates' spending went from an average of $35,054 to $328,228 in the same period.

=== Governor ===
George Pataki, a Republican, was re-elected to a third term.

=== Attorney General ===
Democratic Eliot Spitzer was re-elected to a 2nd term as Attorney General.

=== Comptroller ===
Alan Hevesi was elected to replace fellow Democrat Carl McCall, who ran unsuccessfully for governor.

=== State Senate ===
2002 pre-election	Seats
Republican-Held	36
Democratic-Held	25

A district was added.

2002 post-election	Seats
Republican-Held	37
Democratic-Held	25

=== State Assembly ===
2002 pre-election	Seats
Democratic-Held	97
Republican-Held	52
Vacant	1

2002 post-election	Seats
Democratic-Held	103
Republican-Held	47

== See also ==
- New York gubernatorial elections
- New York state elections
