= 2002 Amagasaki mayoral election =

Amagasaki, Hyōgo held a mayoral election on November 17, 2002. Aya Shirai, backed by the Japanese Communist Party (JCP) and the local group Amagasaki Residents Group for Democratic City Administration defeated the incumbent Yoshio Miyata, who had been mayor since before the Great Hanshin Earthquake and ran on a platform of cutting costs. Miyata had been heavily favored in the race but later came under criticism for his willingness to accept over 35 million yen in severance pay from the city. Miyata's loss effectively marked the end of the Five Party Cooperative Alliance (Rengō Gotō Kyōgikai) that had been established in 1994 to combat the influence of the Liberal Democratic Party and the Japanese Communist Party in Hyōgo Prefecture; Miyata's victory in Amagasaki in 1994 had been the first electoral victory of the Alliance.

Historically, this was the second time a woman was elected mayor in Hyogo Prefecture, and was a precursor to the city electing the youngest female mayor in Japanese history, Kazumi Inamura, in 2010. This represented the first time successive women had been elected mayor in Japan, evidence of a shift from the previous lack of women acting as heads of local and prefectural governments, and has been attributed in part to women's activism in the wake of the Great Hanshin Earthquake. According to Atsushi Tsujikawa, as "an event symbolic of the period", Shirai's election was "featured widely in mass media and became a topic of conversation throughout the country."

Amagasaki mayoral election, 2002: Amagasaki
Party	Candidate	Votes	%	±%
JCP	Aya Shirai	62,308	52.1	
LDP, DPJ, NKP, NCP	Yoshio Miyata	57,385	47.9	
