= 2002 Rochdale Metropolitan Borough Council election =

2002 UK local government election

Elections to Rochdale Council were held on 2 May 2002. One third of the council was up for election and the Labour Party kept overall control of the council.

After the election, the composition of the council was:

- Labour 31
- Liberal Democrat 21
- Conservative 8

== Election result ==
Rochdale local election result 2002
Party	Seats	Gains	Losses	Net gain/loss	Seats %	Votes %	Votes	+/−
Labour	12			0	57.1	44.8	21,570	
Liberal Democrats	7			0	33.3	29.5	14,189	
Conservative	2			0	9.5	22.7	10,922	
Independent	0			0	0	2.5	1,215	
Socialist Alliance	0			0	0	0.3	139	
Liberal	0			0	0	0.2	76	
Christian Democrat	0			0	0	0.1	31	

== Ward results ==
Balderstone
Party	Candidate	Votes	%	±%
Labour		1,261	53.4	
Conservative		779	33.0	
Liberal Democrats		323	13.7	
Majority		482	20.4	
Turnout		2,363		

Brimrod and Deeplish
Party	Candidate	Votes	%	±%
Liberal Democrats		1,094	51.9	
Labour		845	40.1	
Conservative		170	8.1	
Majority		249	11.8	
Turnout		2,109		

Castleton
Party	Candidate	Votes	%	±%
Liberal Democrats		1,364	50.4	
Labour		1,079	39.9	
Conservative		261	9.7	
Majority		285	10.5	
Turnout		2,704		

Central and Falinge
Party	Candidate	Votes	%	±%
Labour		1,674	65.3	
Liberal Democrats		699	27.3	
Conservative		192	7.5	
Majority		975	38.0	
Turnout		2,565		

Healey
Party	Candidate	Votes	%	±%
Liberal Democrats		1,227	37.4	
Labour		1,187	36.1	
Conservative		870	26.5	
Majority		40	1.3	
Turnout		3,284		

Heywood North
Party	Candidate	Votes	%	±%
Labour		993	56.7	
Conservative		546	31.2	
Independent		213	12.2	
Majority		447	25.5	
Turnout		1,752		

Heywood South
Party	Candidate	Votes	%	±%
Labour		1,685	67.1	
Conservative		827	32.9	
Majority		858	34.2	
Turnout		2,512		

Heywood West (2)
Party	Candidate	Votes	%	±%
Labour		1,086		
Labour		920		
Conservative		302		
Conservative		272		
Turnout		2,580		

Littleborough
Party	Candidate	Votes	%	±%
Liberal Democrats		1,340	49.2	
Conservative		735	27.0	
Labour		649	23.8	
Majority		605	22.2	
Turnout		2,724		

Middleton Central
Party	Candidate	Votes	%	±%
Labour		984	70.6	
Liberal Democrats		331	23.7	
Socialist Alliance		79	5.7	
Majority		653	46.9	
Turnout		1,394		

Middleton East
Party	Candidate	Votes	%	±%
Labour		1,051	48.9	
Liberal Democrats		864	40.2	
Conservative		202	9.4	
Christian Democrat		31	1.4	
Majority		187	8.7	
Turnout		2,148		

Middleton North
Party	Candidate	Votes	%	±%
Labour		1,001	60.9	
Liberal Democrats		644	39.1	
Majority		357	21.8	
Turnout		1,645		

Middleton South
Party	Candidate	Votes	%	±%
Labour		1,589	52.4	
Conservative		1,072	35.4	
Liberal Democrats		370	12.2	
Majority		517	17.0	
Turnout		3,031		

Middleton West
Party	Candidate	Votes	%	±%
Labour		801	69.2	
Conservative		143	12.3	
Liberal Democrats		78	6.7	
Liberal		76	6.6	
Socialist Alliance		60	5.2	
Majority		658	56.9	
Turnout		1,158		

Milnrow and Newhey
Party	Candidate	Votes	%	±%
Liberal Democrats		1,176	48.7	
Labour		647	26.8	
Conservative		590	24.5	
Majority		529	21.9	
Turnout		2,413		

Newbold
Party	Candidate	Votes	%	±%
Labour		1,260	65.8	
Liberal Democrats		417	21.8	
Conservative		238	12.4	
Majority		843	44.0	
Turnout		1,915		

Norden and Bamford
Party	Candidate	Votes	%	±%
Conservative		1,881	53.9	
Liberal Democrats		1,112	31.9	
Labour		494	14.2	
Majority		769	22.0	
Turnout		3,487		

Smallbridge
Party	Candidate	Votes	%	±%
Liberal Democrats		1,562	39.2	
Labour		1,422	35.7	
Independent		1,002	25.1	
Majority		140	3.5	
Turnout		3,986		

Spotland
Party	Candidate	Votes	%	±%
Liberal Democrats		1,274	60.6	
Labour		538	25.6	
Conservative		292	13.9	
Majority		736	35.0	
Turnout		2,104		

Wardle
Party	Candidate	Votes	%	±%
Conservative		1,550	68.3	
Labour		404	17.8	
Liberal Democrats		314	13.8	
Majority		1,146	50.5	
Turnout		2,268		
