= 2002 Redditch Borough Council election =

2002 UK local government election

The 2002 Redditch Borough Council election of 2 May 2002 elected members of Redditch Borough Council in the West Midlands region, England. One third of the council stood for re-election and the Labour Party lost overall control of the council to no overall control for the first time in many years.

After the election, the council comprised:

- Labour 14
- Conservative 12
- Liberal Democrat 3

== Campaign ==
Before the election, only a small swing would have seen the Labour party lose its majority on Redditch council, with the opposition Conservatives and Liberal Democrats only needing to pick up three seats between them for this to happen. The Labour Party was defending seven of the eleven seats to be decided and campaigned on its success over the previous years in eliminating all council debt. There was an extra seat in West ward where the Conservative leader on the council, Carol Grandy, stood down.

== Election results ==
Labour lost its majority but remained the largest party. Labour had held control of the council for the previous 20 years but lost this after the other parties gained three seats in the election. Among Labour losses was its leader on the council, Albert Wharrad, who lost in Winyates ward to the Liberal Democrats. One of the closest results was in Lodge Park ward where Labour held on by 22 votes and Mohammed Nasir became the first Asian councillor on Redditch council. The results meant no party had a majority on the council for the first time in over 50 years, and the Conservative party claimed that the results would have been sufficient for them to have gained Redditch constituency in a general election. Turnout in the election was higher than in the last few years at 29.8%.

Following the election, the Labour and Conservative parties on the council elected new leaders and attempted to gain Liberal Democrat support to control the council. However, the Liberal Democrats said that they would not form an agreement with either Labour or the Conservatives on their own. In the end, at the council's annual general meeting on 15 May, all parties joined the executive of the council, which was formed with four Labour, three Conservative and one Liberal Democrat members. The Conservatives had wanted an executive in which both they and Labour had the same number of seats and accused the Liberal Democrats of backing Labour to prevent this. The new Labour leader, David Cartwright, was elected leader of the council and retained the chairman's casting vote.

Redditch local election result 2002
Party	Seats	Gains	Losses	Net gain/loss	Seats %	Votes %	Votes	+/−
Conservative	5	2	0	+2	45.5	42.6	7,645	
Labour	4	0	3	-3	36.4	33.0	5,925	
Liberal Democrats	2	1	0	+1	18.2	23.2	4,172	
Independent	0	0	0	0	0	1.2	207	

== Ward results ==
Abbey
Party	Candidate	Votes	%	±%
Liberal Democrats	Diane Thomas	986	63.7	
Labour	Robin King	345	22.3	
Conservative	Gordon Hazelton	216	14.0	
Majority		641	41.4	
Turnout		1,547		
Liberal Democrats hold		Swing		

Batchley
Party	Candidate	Votes	%	±%
Labour	Jack Cookson	793	52.0	
Conservative	Peter Anderson	523	34.3	
Liberal Democrats	Kathleen Cummings	208	13.6	
Majority		270	17.7	
Turnout		1,524		
Labour hold		Swing		

Central
Party	Candidate	Votes	%	±%
Labour	Stephen Wheeler	806	47.1	
Conservative	Michael Braley	684	40.0	
Liberal Democrats	Adam Isherwood	222	13.0	
Majority		122	7.1	
Turnout		1,712		
Labour hold		Swing		

Crabbs Cross
Party	Candidate	Votes	%	±%
Conservative	Sarah Sulley	791	50.5	
Labour	Les Smith	584	37.3	
Liberal Democrats	David Gee	192	12.3	
Majority		207	13.2	
Turnout		1,567		
Conservative gain from Labour		Swing		

Feckenham
Party	Candidate	Votes	%	±%
Conservative	Michael Chalk	967	57.3	
Labour	Patricia Hill	449	26.6	
Liberal Democrats	Graham Pollard	273	16.2	
Majority		518	30.7	
Turnout		1,689		
Conservative hold		Swing		

Greenlands
Party	Candidate	Votes	%	±%
Labour	Philip Mould	790	43.8	
Conservative	Tracey Smithers	767	42.6	
Liberal Democrats	Anthony Pitt	245	13.6	
Majority		23	1.2	
Turnout		1,802		
Labour hold		Swing		

Lodge Park
Party	Candidate	Votes	%	±%
Labour	Mohammad Nasir	474	35.6	
Conservative	Janet Clark	452	33.9	
Independent	Simon Preston	207	15.5	
Liberal Democrats	Ian Webster	200	15.0	
Majority		22	1.7	
Turnout		1,333		
Labour hold		Swing		

Matchborough
Party	Candidate	Votes	%	±%
Conservative	Anita Clayton	867	50.8	
Labour	Iris Beech	570	33.4	
Liberal Democrats	Christopher Hennessey	270	15.8	
Majority		297	17.4	
Turnout		1,707		
Conservative gain from Labour		Swing		

West (2)
Party	Candidate	Votes	%	±%
Conservative	Karen Lumley	1,182		
Conservative	Gavin Smithers	1,047		
Labour	John Witherspoon	536		
Liberal Democrats	Caroline Ashall	415		
Liberal Democrats	Michael Ashall	383		
Turnout		3,563		
Conservative hold		Swing		
Conservative hold		Swing		

Winyates
Party	Candidate	Votes	%	±%
Liberal Democrats	Cyril Springall	778	51.7	
Labour	Albert Wharrad	578	38.4	
Conservative	Gordon Craig	149	9.9	
Majority		200	13.3	
Turnout		1,505		
Liberal Democrats gain from Labour		Swing		
