= 2002 Waveney District Council election =

2002 UK local government election

Map of the results

The 2002 Waveney Council election took place on 2 May 2002 to elect members of Waveney District Council in Suffolk, England. The whole council was up for election with boundary changes since the last election in 2000. The Labour Party lost overall control of the council to no overall control.

== Election results ==
Overall turnout in the election was 35.1%.

2002 Waveney District Council election
Party	This election			Full council			This election		
Party	Seats	Net	Seats %	Other	Total	Total %	Votes	Votes %	+/−
Labour	21	▼6	43.8	0	21	43.8	27,097	45.7	+8.3
Conservative	21	▲6	43.8	0	21	43.8	18,840	31.8	-7.8
Liberal Democrats	3	Steady	6.3	0	3	6.3	8,384	14.1	-4.1
Independent	3	Steady	6.3	0	3	6.3	3,235	5.5	+0.7
Green	0	Steady	0.0	0	0	0.0	1,023	1.7	N/A
Socialist Alliance	0	Steady	0.0	0	0	0.0	367	0.6	N/A
UKIP	0	Steady	0.0	0	0	0.0	319	0.5	N/A

== Ward results ==
=== Beccles North ===
Beccles North (2)
Party	Candidate	Votes	%
Conservative	C Punt	626	
Labour	A Thwaites	614	
Labour	M Blunt	534	
Conservative	M Wade	519	
Green	G Elliott	230	
Independent	C Scott	222	
Liberal Democrats	U Bentley	204	
Turnout		2,949	41.6
Conservative win (new seat)			
Labour win (new seat)			

=== Beccles South ===
Beccles South (2)
Party	Candidate	Votes	%
Labour	J Walmesley	451	
Labour	M Adams	411	
Conservative	S Cole	305	
UKIP	B Aylett	196	
Liberal Democrats	A Briggs	159	
Liberal Democrats	S Went	111	
Green	M McGee	91	
Turnout		1,724	25.4
Labour win (new seat)			
Labour win (new seat)			

=== Blything ===
Blything
Party	Candidate	Votes	%	±%
Conservative	W Mawer	479	68.6	
Labour	L Watling	219	31.4	
Majority		260	37.2	
Turnout		698	40.7	
Conservative hold		Swing		

=== Bungay ===
Bungay (2)
Party	Candidate	Votes	%	±%
Labour	D Jermy	726		
Conservative	J Groom	659		
Labour	L Derges	568		
Conservative	D Allum	469		
Liberal Democrats	W Curry	184		
Green	R Vinton	170		
Turnout		2,776	39.0	
Labour hold				
Conservative hold				

=== Carlton ===
Carlton (2)
Party	Candidate	Votes	%	±%
Conservative	S Ardley	458		
Conservative	B Reader	434		
Labour	J Ford	326		
Labour	M Swan	240		
Liberal Democrats	B Howe	140		
Turnout		1,598	25.0	
Conservative gain from Labour				
Conservative hold				

=== Carlton Colville ===
Carlton Colville (3)
Party	Candidate	Votes	%	±%
Conservative	R Bell	655		
Conservative	S Sayer	567		
Conservative	K Grant	551		
Labour	R Jack	548		
Labour	I Kelly	491		
Labour	R Chapman	486		
Liberal Democrats	J Marsden	204		
Turnout		3,502	26.2	
Conservative hold				
Conservative win (new seat)				
Conservative win (new seat)				

=== Gunton and Corton ===
Gunton and Corton (2)
Party	Candidate	Votes	%
Conservative	S Chilvers	927	
Conservative	M Rudd	863	
Labour	H Blowers	507	
Labour	M Turner	297	
Liberal Democrats	A Moles	185	
Green	M Narburgh	166	
Turnout		2,945	43.6
Conservative win (new seat)			
Conservative win (new seat)			

=== Halesworth ===
Halesworth (2)
Party	Candidate	Votes	%	±%
Conservative	P Flegg	756		
Conservative	R Niblett	697		
Labour	E Leverett	680		
Labour	P Whitlow	548		
Liberal Democrats	H Watts	196		
Turnout		2,877	41.9	
Conservative gain from Labour				
Conservative hold				

=== Harbour ===
Harbour (3)
Party	Candidate	Votes	%	±%
Independent	R Ford	898		
Independent	I Turrell	643		
Labour	I Graham	622		
Labour	A Turner	588		
Independent	N Keable	582		
Labour	P Widdowson	471		
Liberal Democrats	J Thain	325		
Liberal Democrats	P Meadez	281		
Conservative	M Ardley	232		
Socialist Alliance	R Mallin	120		
Turnout		4,762	33.1	
Independent hold				
Independent gain from Labour				
Labour hold				

=== Kessingland ===
Kessingland (2)
Party	Candidate	Votes	%	±%
Labour	N Hodges	726		
Labour	R Breach	627		
Conservative	K Sale	507		
Conservative	P Joslin	454		
Liberal Democrats	L Lakes	167		
Turnout		2,481	36.4	
Labour hold				
Labour gain from Conservative				

=== Kirkley ===
Kirkley (3)
Party	Candidate	Votes	%	±%
Liberal Democrats	A Shepherd	886		
Liberal Democrats	D Young	850		
Liberal Democrats	G Baxter	796		
Labour	S Balls	694		
Labour	E Skepelhorn	652		
Labour	S Masterson	632		
Conservative	J Corbett	193		
Turnout		4,703	33.5	
Liberal Democrats hold				
Liberal Democrats hold				
Liberal Democrats hold				

=== Lothingland ===
Lothingland
Party	Candidate	Votes	%	±%
Labour	B Hunter	291	45.8	
Conservative	J Fraser	253	39.8	
Liberal Democrats	A Thomas	91	14.3	
Majority		38	6.0	
Turnout		635	37.5	
Labour hold		Swing		

=== Normanston ===
Normanston (3)
Party	Candidate	Votes	%	±%
Labour	F Jones	883		
Labour	K Patience	786		
Labour	D Thomas	680		
Conservative	A Mylan	339		
Liberal Democrats	P Holmes-Thrower	293		
Green	S Sizer	188		
Socialist Alliance	N Bird	128		
Turnout		3,297	27.3	
Labour hold				
Labour hold				
Labour hold				

=== Oulton ===
Oulton (2)
Party	Candidate	Votes	%
Labour	J Hinton	527	
Conservative	A Borrett	439	
Conservative	S Ames	416	
Labour	A Thomson	406	
Liberal Democrats	A Tibbitt	203	
Turnout		1,991	35.2
Labour win (new seat)			
Conservative win (new seat)			

=== Oulton Broad ===
Oulton Broad (2)
Party	Candidate	Votes	%	±%
Conservative	C Law	610		
Conservative	S Keller	546		
Labour	M Rodgers	528		
Labour	I Melvin	460		
Liberal Democrats	A Martin	223		
Turnout		2,367	35.2	
Conservative gain from Labour				
Conservative hold				

=== Pakefield ===
Pakefield (3)
Party	Candidate	Votes	%	±%
Labour	T Kelly	979		
Labour	M Pitchers	913		
Labour	R Thorne	893		
Liberal Democrats	J Van Pelt	603		
Liberal Democrats	R Dyball	531		
Conservative	V Pulford	505		
Liberal Democrats	B Batchelder	499		
Turnout		4,923	37.0	
Labour hold				
Labour hold				
Labour hold				

=== Southwold and Reydon ===
Southwold and Reydon (2)
Party	Candidate	Votes	%
Independent	M Ladd	890	
Conservative	P Austin	877	
Conservative	K Keable	720	
Labour	A Clarke	246	
Labour	J Wagner	240	
Turnout		2,973	53.1
Independent win (new seat)			
Conservative win (new seat)			

=== St. Margaret's ===
St Margarets (3)
Party	Candidate	Votes	%	±%
Labour	W Devereux	913		
Labour	J Winterton	818		
Labour	R Winterton	784		
Conservative	S Foulger	518		
Liberal Democrats	L Batchelder	421		
Socialist Alliance	M Palmer	119		
Turnout		3,573	29.0	
Labour hold				
Labour hold				
Labour hold				

=== The Saints ===
The Saints
Party	Candidate	Votes	%	±%
Conservative	M Rose	450	58.6	
Green	A Abbott	113	14.7	
Labour	C Caswell	111	14.5	
Liberal Democrats	R Pumer	94	12.2	
Majority		337	43.9	
Turnout		768	44.6	
Conservative hold				

=== Wainford ===
Wainford
Party	Candidate	Votes	%	±%
Conservative	M Bee	376	52.5	
Liberal Democrats	N Bromley	148	20.7	
Labour	J Seal	127	17.7	
Green	N Elliott	65	9.1	
Majority		228	31.8	
Turnout		716	41.7	
Conservative hold		Swing		

=== Whitton ===
Whitton (3)
Party	Candidate	Votes	%	±%
Labour	D Castleton	1,030		
Labour	S Spore	910		
Labour	A Skipper	905		
Conservative	B Bee	555		
Liberal Democrats	S Tonge	417		
Turnout		3,817	31.7	
Labour hold				
Labour hold				
Labour hold				

=== Worlingham ===
Worlingham (2)
Party	Candidate	Votes	%
Conservative	S Jones	743	
Conservative	D Francis	712	
Labour	J Taylor	495	
Labour	P Shelly	361	
Liberal Democrats	D O'Neil	173	
UKIP	B Poole	123	
Turnout		2,607	41.5
Conservative win (new seat)			
Conservative win (new seat)			

=== Wrentham ===
Wrentham
Party	Candidate	Votes	%
Conservative	J Goldsmith	430	73.8
Labour	Whatrup	153	26.2
Majority		277	47.6
Turnout		583	33.9
Conservative win (new seat)			
