= Jolles =

Jolles is a surname and may apply to:

- Henry Jolles, German/Brazilian classical pianist
- Sir John Jolles, Lord Mayor of London in 1615
- Marion Jolles, sports announcer
- Muriel Jolles, a candidate in the Harlow Council elections of 2003, 2004, 2006, and 2008
- O. J. Matthijs Jolles, professor of German who translated Clausewitz's On War into English
- Simon Jolles, Chief Rabbi of Hungary ca. 1717
- Zechariah Isaiah Jolles (1814–1852), rabbinical scholar and writer

== See also ==
- Jolle (disambiguation)
