= 2011 Harlow District Council election =

← 2010	5 May 2011	2012 →

11 of the 33 seats to Harlow District Council 17 seats needed for a majority
	First party	Second party	Third party
Party	Conservative	Labour	Liberal Democrats
Last election	18	10	5
Seats before	18	11	4
Seats won	4	7	0
Seats after	17	14	2
Seat change	▼1	▲3	▼2
Popular vote	9,450	10,292	2,419
Percentage	42.3%	46.1%	10.8%
- Map showing the results of contested wards in the 2011 Harlow District Council elections.
Council control before election
Conservative
Council control after election
Conservative

The 2011 Harlow District Council election took place on 5 May 2011 to elect members of Harlow District Council in Essex, England. One third of the council was up for election and the Conservative Party stayed in overall control of the council.

After the election, the composition of the council was:

- Conservative 17
- Labour 14
- Liberal Democrats 2

== Background ==
After the last election in 2010 the Conservatives controlled the council with 18 seats, compared to 10 for Labour and 5 for the Liberal Democrats. The Liberal Democrat group was reduced further in December 2010 when councillor Manny Doku of Bush Fair ward defected to Labour.

34 candidates stood for the 11 seats contested, with the Conservative and Labour group leaders, Andrew Johnson and Mark Wilkinson, defending seats in Church Langley and Harlow Common wards. The Liberal Democrats were defending 2 seats, but their group leader Chris Millington of Bush Fair ward stood down at the election. Conservative councillor Patrick McClarnon also stood down from his Great Parndon ward, while seats in Staple Tye and Sumners and Kingsmoor were vacant after Conservative councillors Lee and Sarah Dangerfield resigned from the council in November 2010.

== Election result ==
The Conservatives remained in control of the council with 17 councillors, but Labour made 3 gains to move to 14 seats, while the Liberal Democrats dropped to 2 seats. The Labour gains meant they won 7 of the 11 seats contested in 2011, including taking Staple Tye which previously had been held by the Conservatives before the councillor had resigned from the council. Meanwhile, the Liberal Democrats lost both the seats they had been defending in Bush Fair and Mark Hall to Labour and lost vote share everywhere.

Harlow local election result 2011
Party	Seats	Gains	Losses	Net gain/loss	Seats %	Votes %	Votes	+/−
Labour	7	3	0	▲3	63.6	46.1	10,292	▲9.8
Conservative	4	0	1	▼1	36.4	42.3	9,450	▲0.7
Liberal Democrats	0	0	2	▼2	0	10.8	2,419	▼10.7
UKIP	0	0	0	Steady	0	0.8	178	▲0.8

== Ward results ==
=== Bush Fair ===
Location of Bush Fair ward

Bush Fair
Party	Candidate	Votes	%	±%
Labour	Ian Beckett	1,113	54.3	+17.9
Conservative	Samuel Stopplecamp	501	24.5	−6.1
Liberal Democrats	James Rideout	256	12.5	−20.5
UKIP	Donald Crane	178	8.7	+8.7
Majority		612	29.9	+26.4
Turnout		2,048	36.4	−25.3
Labour gain from Liberal Democrats		Swing		

=== Church Langley ===
Location of Church Langley ward

Church Langley
Party	Candidate	Votes	%	±%
Conservative	Andrew Johnson	1,417	66.1	+3.2
Labour	Kenneth Lawrie	599	28.0	+4.8
Liberal Democrats	Brenda Nichols	127	5.9	−8.0
Majority		818	38.2	−1.5
Turnout		2,143	34.1	−33.5
Conservative hold		Swing		

=== Great Parndon ===
Location of Great Parndon ward

Great Parndon
Party	Candidate	Votes	%	±%
Conservative	David Carter	1,093	52.0	+4.3
Labour	Norman Knight	855	40.7	+4.6
Liberal Democrats	Pauline Bell	152	7.2	−9.0
Majority		238	11.3	−0.3
Turnout		2,100	41.1	−27.1
Conservative hold		Swing		

=== Harlow Common ===
Location of Harlow Common ward

Harlow Common
Party	Candidate	Votes	%	±%
Labour	Mark Wilkinson	1,140	51.0	+10.9
Conservative	John Steer	929	41.5	+2.8
Liberal Democrats	Laurence Bonwick	167	7.5	−8.5
Majority		211	9.4	+8.0
Turnout		2,236	40.5	−25.0
Labour hold		Swing		

=== Little Parndon and Hare Street ===
Location of Little Parndon and Hare Street ward

Little Parndon and Hare Street
Party	Candidate	Votes	%	±%
Labour	Valerie Clark	1,270	59.7	+13.2
Conservative	Mark Perrin	722	33.9	−2.1
Liberal Democrats	Neil Kerlen	137	6.4	−11.0
Majority		548	25.7	+15.2
Turnout		2,129	36.2	−25.0
Labour hold		Swing		

=== Mark Hall ===
Location of Mark Hall ward

Mark Hall
Party	Candidate	Votes	%	±%
Labour	Paul Schroder	913	45.4	+9.8
Liberal Democrats	Lesley Rideout	555	27.6	−7.0
Conservative	Valerie Gough	542	27.0	−2.8
Majority		358	17.8	+16.8
Turnout		2,010	39.5	−23.9
Labour gain from Liberal Democrats		Swing		

=== Netteswell ===
Location of Netteswell ward

Netteswell
Party	Candidate	Votes	%	±%
Labour	Edna Stevens	959	53.2	+12.1
Conservative	Darren Bilmen	636	35.3	+3.0
Liberal Democrats	Kuzna Jackson	206	11.4	−15.2
Majority		323	17.9	+9.0
Turnout		1,801	32.9	−26.1
Labour hold		Swing		

=== Old Harlow ===
Location of Old Harlow ward

Old Harlow
Party	Candidate	Votes	%	±%
Conservative	Sue Livings	1,216	54.0	+2.2
Labour	Thomas Newens	890	39.5	+7.7
Liberal Democrats	Robert Thurston	145	6.4	−9.9
Majority		326	14.5	−5.5
Turnout		2,251	41.6	−27.2
Conservative hold		Swing		

=== Staple Tye ===
Location of Staple Tye ward

Staple Tye
Party	Candidate	Votes	%	±%
Labour	Dennis Palmer	784	44.6	+10.0
Conservative	Andrew Shannon	606	34.5	−2.2
Liberal Democrats	Cheryl Hickey	367	20.9	−7.8
Majority		178	10.1	
Turnout		1,757	34.1	−23.7
Labour gain from Conservative		Swing		

=== Summers and Kingsmoor ===
Location of Summers and Kingsmoor ward

Summers and Kingsmoor
Party	Candidate	Votes	%	±%
Conservative	Linda Pailing	918	49.7	+4.1
Labour	Jacqueline Cross	777	42.0	+8.5
Liberal Democrats	Merrick Jackson	153	8.3	−12.5
Majority		141	7.6	−4.5
Turnout		1,848	34.0	−26.8
Conservative hold		Swing		

=== Toddbrook ===
Location of Toddbrook ward

Toddbrook
Party	Candidate	Votes	%	±%
Labour	Robert Davis	992	49.2	+5.4
Conservative	Michael Hardware	870	43.2	+5.1
Liberal Democrats	Christopher Robins	154	7.6	−10.5
Majority		122	6.1	+0.4
Turnout		2,016	37.6	−24.2
Labour hold		Swing		
