= 2012 Harlow District Council election =

← 2011	3 May 2012	2014 →

11 of the 33 seats to Harlow District Council 17 seats needed for a majority
	First party	Second party	Third party
Party	Labour	Conservative	Liberal Democrats
Seats before	14	17	2
Seats won	7	4	0
Seats after	20	13	0
Seat change	▲6	▼4	▼2
Popular vote	9,722	7,083	1,467
Percentage	52.1%	38.0%	7.9%
- Map showing the results of contested wards in the 2012 Harlow District Council elections.
Council control before election
Conservative
Council control after election
Labour

The 2012 Harlow District Council election took place on 3 May 2012 to elect members of Harlow District Council in Essex, England. One third of the council was up for election and the Labour Party gained overall control of the council from the Conservative Party.

After the election, the composition of the council was:

- Labour 20
- Conservative 13

== Background ==
After the last election in 2011 the Conservatives remained in control of the council with 17 councillors, compared to 14 for Labour and 2 for the Liberal Democrats. However, in October 2011 one of the two Liberal Democrat councillors, John Strachan of Staple Tye ward defected to the Labour Party.

Harlow was reported in the national press to be one of Labour's top targets in the 2012 local elections.

== Election result ==
The Labour Party gained control of Harlow from the Conservatives after gaining 5 seats including 4 from the Conservatives. The Labour gains from the Conservatives came in Harlow Common, Little Parndon and Hare Street, Netteswell and Toddbrook and meant Labour won 8 of the 12 seats contested. The Conservatives had controlled the council since winning a majority at the 2008 election.

The other Labour gain came from the Liberal Democrats in Mark Hall ward and meant the Liberal Democrats no longer had any councillors in Harlow. The Liberal Democrats did not come close to taking any of the seats contested, with some candidates getting less than 100 votes. Overall turnout at the election was 28.43%, the lowest turnout ever for a local election in Harlow.

Harlow local election result 2012
Party	Seats	Gains	Losses	Net gain/loss	Seats %	Votes %	Votes	+/−
Labour	8	5	0	▲5	66.7	52.1	9,722	▲6.0
Conservative	4	0	4	▼4	33.3	38.0	7,083	▼4.3
Liberal Democrats	0	0	1	▼1	0.0	7.9	1,467	▼2.9
UKIP	0	0	0	Steady	0.0	1.3	236	▲0.5
Independent	0	0	0	Steady	0.0	0.8	149	▲0.8

== Ward results ==
=== Bush Fair (2 seats) ===
Location of Bush Fair ward

Bush Fair (2 seats)
Party	Candidate	Votes	%	±%
Labour	Manny Doku	1,021		
Labour	Daniella Pritchard	877		
Conservative	Michael Hardware	259		
UKIP	Donald Crane	236		
Conservative	Andy Shannon	182		
Liberal Democrats	Ian Jackson	109		
Liberal Democrats	Roy Jackson	90		
Turnout		2,774	28.0	−8.4
Labour hold		Swing		
Labour hold		Swing		

=== Church Langley ===
Location of Church Langley ward

Church Langley
Party	Candidate	Votes	%	±%
Conservative	Simon Carter	1,007	65.3	−0.8
Labour	Ken Lawrie	454	29.4	+1.4
Liberal Democrats	Laura Rideout	82	5.3	−0.6
Majority		553	35.8	−2.4
Turnout		1,543	24.3	−9.8
Conservative hold		Swing		

=== Great Parndon ===
Location of Great Parndon ward

Great Parndon
Party	Candidate	Votes	%	±%
Conservative	Eddie Johnson	774	47.8	−4.2
Labour	Norman Knight	749	46.2	+5.5
Liberal Democrats	Lesley Rideout	97	6.0	−1.2
Majority		25	1.5	−9.8
Turnout		1,620	31.6	−9.5
Conservative hold		Swing		

=== Harlow Common ===
Location of Harlow Common ward

Harlow Common
Party	Candidate	Votes	%	±%
Labour	Emma Toal	902	51.3	+0.3
Conservative	Clive Souter	637	36.2	−5.3
Independent	Gary Roberts	149	8.5	+8.5
Liberal Democrats	Chris Millington	72	4.1	−3.4
Majority		265	15.1	+5.7
Turnout		1,760	31.7	−8.8
Labour gain from Conservative		Swing		

=== Little Parndon and Hare Street ===
Location of Little Parndon and Hare Street ward

Little Parndon and Hare Street
Party	Candidate	Votes	%	±%
Labour	Jon Clempner	1,099	63.9	+4.2
Conservative	Shona Johnson	521	30.3	−3.6
Liberal Democrats	Neil Kerlen	100	5.8	−0.6
Majority		578	33.6	+7.9
Turnout		1,720	28.4	−7.8
Labour gain from Conservative		Swing		

=== Mark Hall ===
Location of Mark Hall ward

Mark Hall
Party	Candidate	Votes	%	±%
Labour	Jacqui Cross	849	53.0	+7.6
Conservative	Jane Steer	440	27.5	+0.5
Liberal Democrats	James Rideout	312	19.5	−8.1
Majority		409	25.5	+7.7
Turnout		1,601	30.5	−9.0
Labour gain from Liberal Democrats		Swing		

=== Netteswell ===
Location of Netteswell ward

Netteswell
Party	Candidate	Votes	%	±%
Labour	Waida Forman	818	55.4	+2.2
Conservative	Mark Gough	538	36.4	+1.1
Liberal Democrats	Kuzna Jackson	120	8.1	−3.3
Majority		280	19.0	+1.1
Turnout		1,476	26.7	−6.2
Labour gain from Conservative		Swing		

=== Old Harlow ===
Location of Old Harlow ward

Old Harlow
Party	Candidate	Votes	%	±%
Conservative	Muriel Jolles	934	51.6	−2.4
Labour	Tom Newens	771	42.6	+3.1
Liberal Democrats	Mary Wiltshire	105	5.8	−0.6
Majority		163	9.0	−5.5
Turnout		1,810	33.2	−8.4
Conservative hold		Swing		

=== Staple Tye ===
Location of Staple Tye ward

Staple Tye
Party	Candidate	Votes	%	±%
Labour	Patrick McCabe	657	50.9	+6.3
Conservative	Stevie Souter	450	34.8	+0.3
Liberal Democrats	Cheryl Hickey	185	14.3	−6.6
Majority		207	16.0	+5.9
Turnout		1,292	24.3	−9.8
Labour hold		Swing		

=== Summers and Kingsmoor ===
Location of Summers and Kingsmoor ward

Summers and Kingsmoor
Party	Candidate	Votes	%	±%
Conservative	Russell Perrin	687	49.1	−0.6
Labour	Dan Long	623	44.6	+2.6
Liberal Democrats	Brenda Nichols	88	6.3	−2.0
Majority		64	4.6	−3.0
Turnout		1,398	25.7	−8.3
Conservative hold		Swing		

=== Toddbrook ===
Location of Toddbrook ward

Toddbrook
Party	Candidate	Votes	%	±%
Labour	Phil Waite	902	54.2	+5.0
Conservative	Joel Charles	654	39.3	−3.9
Liberal Democrats	Christopher Robins	107	6.4	−1.2
Majority		248	14.9	+8.8
Turnout		1,663	29.2	−8.4
Labour gain from Conservative		Swing		

== By-elections between 2012 and 2014 ==
A by-election was held in Toddbrook on 15 November 2012 after Labour councillor Bob Davis resigned from the council. The seat was held for Labour by Christine O'Dell with a majority of 221 votes over the Conservatives.

Toddbrook by-election 15 November 2012
Party	Candidate	Votes	%	±%
Labour	Christine O'Dell	604	52.5	−1.7
Conservative	Clive Souter	383	33.3	−6.0
UKIP	Bill Pryor	111	9.6	+9.6
Liberal Democrats	Roy Jackson	53	4.6	−1.8
Majority		221	19.2	+4.3
Turnout		1,151	20.2	−9.0
Labour hold		Swing		
