= 2015 Harlow District Council election =

← 2014	7 May 2015	2016 →

12 of the 33 seats to Harlow District Council 17 seats needed for a majority
	First party	Second party	Third party
Party	Labour	Conservative	UKIP
Last election	17	11	5
Seats before	18	11	4
Seats won	7	5	0
Seats after	19	12	2
Seat change	▲1	▲1	▼2
Popular vote	14,777	17,313	8,644
Percentage	35.3%	41.4%	20.7%
- Map showing the results of contested wards in the 2015 Harlow District Council elections.
Council control before election
Labour
Council control after election
Labour

The 2015 Harlow District Council election took place on 7 May 2015 to elect members of Harlow District Council in Essex, England. One third of the council was up for election and Labour Party councillors increased their control of the council as the governing group, gaining one councillor and suffering no losses.

== Background ==
After the last election in 2014 Labour remained in control of the council with 17 councillors, while the Conservatives had 11 seats and the UK Independence Party had 5 seats. However Labour gained a seat from the UK Independence Party at a by-election for Mark Hall ward in February 2015.

A UKIP councillor for Great Parndon ward, Terry Spooner, resigned in March to retire to Dorset so two of its three seats were contested at the 2015 election, leading to 12 seats up for election, which were contested by 43 candidates: 12 each affiliated to Labour, the Conservatives and UKIP and seven Liberal Democrats.

== Election result ==
Labour remained in control of the council with 19 councillors after winning 7 of the 12 seats contested. Both they and the Conservatives gained a seat at the expense of the UK Independence Party, taking the Conservatives to 12 seats on the council, while the UK Independence Party was left with two councillors. Overall turnout at the election was 62.68%.

2015 Harlow local election result
Party	Seats	Gains	Losses	Net gain/loss	Seats %	Votes %	Votes	+/−
Labour	7	1	0	▲1	58.3	35.3	14,777	▲1.9
Conservative	5	1	0	▲1	41.7	41.4	17,313	▲13.9
UKIP	0	0	2	▼2	0	20.7	8,644	▼13.6
Liberal Democrats	0	0	0	Steady	0	2.6	1,098	▼0.4

== Ward results ==
=== Bush Fair ===
Location of Bush Fair ward

Bush Fair
Party	Candidate	Votes	%	±%
Labour Co-op	Ian Beckett	1,380	39.4	+3.7
Conservative	Malik Ash	1,124	32.1	+15.3
UKIP	Patsy Long	838	23.9	−14.3
Liberal Democrats	Christopher Robins	164	4.7	−0.5
Majority		256	7.3	
Turnout		3,506		
Labour Co-op hold		Swing		

=== Church Langley ===
Location of Church Langley ward

Church Langley
Party	Candidate	Votes	%	±%
Conservative	Andrew Johnson	2,572	59.3	+13.8
Labour	Ken Lawrie	857	19.8	+0.1
UKIP	Robert Patterson	797	18.4	−16.5
Liberal Democrats	Kuzna Jackson	112	2.6	+2.6
Majority		1,715	39.5	+28.9
Turnout		4,338		
Conservative hold		Swing		

=== Great Parndon (2 seats) ===
Location of Great Parndon ward

Great Parndon (2 seats)
Party	Candidate	Votes	%
Conservative	David Carter	1,696	
Conservative	Shona Johnson	1,432	
Labour	Stefan Mullard	1,018	
Labour	Daniella Pritchard	973	
UKIP	Chris Staunton	652	
UKIP	Sam Stopplecamp	604	
Turnout		6,375	
Conservative hold			
Conservative gain from UKIP			

=== Harlow Common ===
Location of Harlow Common ward

Harlow Common
Party	Candidate	Votes	%	±%
Labour	Mark Wilkinson	1,332	37.0	+0.4
Conservative	Emily Cross	1,316	36.5	+14.7
UKIP	Mike Carr	841	23.3	−12.0
Liberal Democrats	Ian Jackson	115	3.2	+0.5
Majority		16	0.4	−1.0
Turnout		3,604		
Labour hold		Swing		

=== Little Parndon and Hare Street ===
Location of Little Parndon and Hare Street ward

Little Parndon and Hare Street
Party	Candidate	Votes	%	±%
Labour	Jean Clark	1,800	48.1	+4.2
Conservative	Peter Lamb	1,232	32.9	+10.8
UKIP	Richie Richardson	711	19.0	−15.0
Majority		568	15.2	+5.3
Turnout		3,743		
Labour hold		Swing		

=== Mark Hall ===
Location of Mark Hall ward

Mark Hall
Party	Candidate	Votes	%	±%
Labour	Bob Davis	1,296	39.7	
Conservative	Jane Steer	1,060	32.5	
UKIP	Janet Doyle	731	22.4	
Liberal Democrats	Lesley Rideout	175	5.4	
Majority		236	7.2	
Turnout		3,262		
Labour gain from UKIP		Swing		

=== Netteswell ===
Location of Netteswell ward

Netteswell
Party	Candidate	Votes	%	±%
Labour	Edna Stevens	1,455	43.7	+2.1
Conservative	John Steer	1,104	33.1	+10.5
UKIP	Christopher Ward	612	18.4	−12.5
Liberal Democrats	Robert Thurston	162	4.9	+0.0
Majority		351	10.5	−0.3
Turnout		3,333		
Labour hold		Swing		

=== Old Harlow ===
Location of Old Harlow ward

Old Harlow
Party	Candidate	Votes	%	±%
Conservative	Sue Livings	2,177	53.8	+11.7
Labour	Efua Koi-Larbi	902	22.3	−5.3
UKIP	Alan Leverett	739	18.3	−7.3
Liberal Democrats	Mary Wiltshire	225	5.6	+0.9
Majority		1,275	31.5	+17.0
Turnout		4,043		
Conservative hold		Swing		

=== Staple Tye ===
Location of Staple Tye ward

Staple Tye
Party	Candidate	Votes	%	±%
Labour	John Strachan	1,129	38.0	+6.6
Conservative	Stevie Souter	1,042	35.1	+12.6
UKIP	Pete Buss	655	22.0	−13.5
Liberal Democrats	Christopher Millington	145	4.9	−0.6
Majority		87	2.9	
Turnout		2,971		
Labour hold		Swing		

=== Summers and Kingsmoor ===
Location of Summers and Kingsmoor ward

Summers and Kingsmoor
Party	Candidate	Votes	%	±%
Conservative	Clive Souter	1,448	43.5	+6.8
Labour	Dennis Palmer	1,115	33.5	+3.9
UKIP	Alex Addison	765	23.0	−10.6
Majority		333	10.0	+6.9
Turnout		3,328		
Conservative hold		Swing		

=== Toddbrook ===
Location of Toddbrook ward

Toddbrook
Party	Candidate	Votes	%	±%
Labour	Karen Clempner	1,520	45.7	+7.2
Conservative	Michael Hardware	1,110	33.3	+8.7
UKIP	Pat Long	699	21.0	−15.9
Majority		410	12.3	+10.8
Turnout		3,329		
Labour hold		Swing		
