= 2014 Harlow District Council election =

← 2012	22 May 2014	2015 →

12 of the 33 seats to Harlow District Council 17 seats needed for a majority
	First party	Second party	Third party
Party	Labour	Conservative	UKIP
Seats before	20	13	0
Seats won	4	3	5
Seats after	17	11	5
Seat change	▼3	▼2	▲5
Popular vote	7,564	6,238	7,768
Percentage	33.4%	27.5%	34.3%
- Map showing the results of contested wards in the 2014 Harlow District Council elections.
Council control before election
Labour
Council control after election
Labour

The 2014 Harlow District Council election took place on 22 May 2014 to elect members of Harlow District Council in Essex, England. One third of the council was up for election and the Labour Party stayed in overall control of the council.

After the election, the composition of the council was:

- Labour 17
- Conservative 11
- UK Independence Party 5

== Background ==
At the last election in 2012 Labour gained control of Harlow Council from the Conservative Party and finished with 20 councillors compared to 13 for the Conservatives. The Conservative group was reduced in May 2013 when Great Parndon councillor Joshua Jolles resigned from the party to sit as an independent, after being unhappy with having to follow national Conservative policies. Joshua Jolles would go on to found a political party, the Harlow Independent Party, which stood candidates at the 2014 Harlow Council elections.

A total of 47 candidates stood at the election, including full slates from the Conservatives, Labour and UK Independence Party, along with 7 candidates from the Liberal Democrats, 3 from the Harlow Independent Party and 1 other independent. An extra seat was contested in Mark Hall ward after Labour councillor Paul Schroder resigned from the council in April 2014. Another 3 councillors stood down at the election, Mike Garnett, Guy Mitchinson and Paul Sztumpf, while Mark Wilkinson stepped down as council leader at the election.

== Election result ==
Labour remained in control of Harlow council, but with only a 1-seat majority after the UK Independence Party gained 5 seats. The UK Independence Party gains in Bush Fair, Great Parndon, Mark Hall and Staple Tye included taking 3 seats from Labour, 1 from the Conservatives and 1 from the Harlow Independent Party. Meanwhile, Labour retained 4 seats and the Conservatives kept 3 seats to leave Labour with 17 councillors, compared to 11 Conservatives and 5 for the UK Independence Party. Overall turnout at the election was 33.5%.

Following the election Jon Clempner was chosen as the leader of the Labour group and became the new council leader.

Harlow local election result 2014
Party	Seats	Gains	Losses	Net gain/loss	Seats %	Votes %	Votes	+/−
UKIP	5	5	0	▲5	41.7	34.3	7,768	▲33.0
Labour	4	0	3	▼3	33.3	33.4	7,564	▼18.7
Conservative	3	0	1	▼1	25.0	27.5	6,238	▼10.5
Liberal Democrats	0	0	0	Steady	0.0	3.0	687	▼4.9
Harlow Independent Party	0	0	1	▼1	0.0	1.4	321	▲1.4
Independent	0	0	0	Steady	0.0	0.3	68	▼0.5

== Ward results ==
=== Bush Fair ===
Location of Bush Fair ward

Bush Fair
Party	Candidate	Votes	%	±%
UKIP	Dan Long	744	38.2	
Labour	Daniella Pritchard	694	35.7	
Conservative	Ash Malik	326	16.8	
Liberal Democrats	Christopher Robins	102	5.2	
Harlow Independent Party	Bob McKenzie	80	4.1	
Majority		50	2.5	
Turnout		1,946	33.4	+5.4
UKIP gain from Labour		Swing		

=== Church Langley ===
Location of Church Langley ward

Church Langley
Party	Candidate	Votes	%	±%
Conservative	Tony Hall	964	45.5	−19.8
UKIP	Mark Gough	739	34.9	+34.9
Labour	Ken Lawrie	417	19.7	−9.7
Majority		225	10.6	−25.2
Turnout		2,120	33.1	+8.8
Conservative hold		Swing		

=== Great Parndon ===
Location of Great Parndon ward

Great Parndon
Party	Candidate	Votes	%	±%
UKIP	Terry Spooner	674	33.2	+33.2
Conservative	Clive Souter	598	29.4	−18.4
Labour	Karen Clempner	596	29.3	−16.9
Harlow Independent Party	Joshua Jolles	165	8.1	+8.1
Majority		76	3.8	
Turnout		2,033	39.0	+7.4
UKIP gain from Independent		Swing		

=== Harlow Common ===
Location of Harlow Common ward

Harlow Common
Party	Candidate	Votes	%	±%
Labour	Maggie Hulcoop	700	36.6	−14.7
UKIP	Sam Stopplecamp	674	35.3	+35.3
Conservative	John Steer	417	21.8	−14.4
Independent	Gary Roberts	68	3.6	−4.9
Liberal Democrats	Kuzna Jackson	51	2.7	−1.4
Majority		26	1.4	−13.7
Turnout		1,910	33.8	+2.1
Labour hold		Swing		

=== Little Parndon and Hare Street ===
Location of Little Parndon and Hare Street ward

Little Parndon and Hare Street
Party	Candidate	Votes	%	±%
Labour	Tony Durcan	879	43.9	−20.0
UKIP	Harry Saunders	680	34.0	+34.0
Conservative	Shona Johnson	442	22.1	−8.2
Majority		199	9.9	−23.7
Turnout		2,001	31.9	+3.5
Labour hold		Swing		

=== Mark Hall (2 seats) ===
Location of Mark Hall ward

Mark Hall (2 seats)
Party	Candidate	Votes	%	±%
UKIP	Jerry Crawford	662	35.7	
UKIP	Janet Doyle	646	34.9	
Labour	Sheila Sullivan	602	32.5	
Labour	Danny Purton	599	32.3	
Conservative	Emily Cross	346	18.7	
Conservative	Jane Steer	346	18.7	
Liberal Democrats	Lesley Rideout	137	7.4	
Liberal Democrats	Robert Thurston	124	6.7	
Turnout		1,853	34.3	+3.8
UKIP gain from Labour		Swing		
UKIP gain from Labour		Swing		

=== Netteswell ===
Location of Netteswell ward

Netteswell
Party	Candidate	Votes	%	±%
Labour	Michael Danvers	739	41.6	−13.8
UKIP	Patsy Long	548	30.9	+30.9
Conservative	Jim Pailing	401	22.6	−13.8
Liberal Democrats	Christopher Millington	87	4.9	−3.2
Majority		191	10.8	−8.2
Turnout		1,775	31.5	+4.8
Labour hold		Swing		

=== Old Harlow ===
Location of Old Harlow ward

Old Harlow
Party	Candidate	Votes	%	±%
Conservative	Joel Charles	918	42.1	−9.5
Labour	Tom Newens	602	27.6	−15.0
UKIP	Steven Witt	557	25.6	+25.6
Liberal Democrats	Mary Wiltshire	102	4.7	−1.1
Majority		316	14.5	+5.5
Turnout		2,179	37.6	+4.4
Conservative hold		Swing		

=== Staple Tye ===
Location of Staple Tye ward

Staple Tye
Party	Candidate	Votes	%	±%
UKIP	Bill Pryor	538	35.5	+35.5
Labour	John Strachan	477	31.4	−19.5
Conservative	Stevie Souter	342	22.5	−12.3
Liberal Democrats	Ian Jackson	84	5.5	−8.8
Harlow Independent Party	Zulqar Cheema	76	5.0	+5.0
Majority		61	4.1	
Turnout		1,517	28.3	+4.0
UKIP gain from Conservative		Swing		

=== Sumners and Kingsmoor ===
Location of Summers and Kingsmoor ward

Sumners and Kingsmoor
Party	Candidate	Votes	%	±%
Conservative	Nicholas Churchill	686	36.7	−12.4
UKIP	Alexander Addison	628	33.6	+33.6
Labour	Efua Koi-Larbi	553	29.6	−15.0
Majority		58	3.1	−1.5
Turnout		1,867	33.7	+8.0
Conservative hold		Swing		

=== Toddbrook ===
Location of Toddbrook ward

Toddbrook
Party	Candidate	Votes	%	±%
Labour	Rod Truan	706	38.5	−15.7
UKIP	Peter Buss	678	36.9	+36.9
Conservative	Michael Hardware	452	24.6	−14.7
Majority		28	1.5	−13.4
Turnout		1,836	31.9	+2.7
Labour hold		Swing		

== By-elections between 2014 and 2015 ==
A by-election was held in Mark Hall ward on 12 February 2015 following the resignation of UK Independence Party councillor Jerry Crawford due to illness. The seat was gained for Labour by Danny Purton with a majority of 233 votes over UK Independence Party candidate Mark Gough, increasing the number of Labour councillors to 18, compared to 11 Conservatives and 4 for the UK Independence Party.

Mark Hall by-election 12 February 2015
Party	Candidate	Votes	%	±%
Labour	Danny Purton	586	42.6	+8.2
UKIP	Mark Gough	353	25.7	−12.2
Conservative	Jane Steer	334	24.3	+4.5
Green	Murray Sackwild	55	4.0	+4.0
Liberal Democrats	Lesley Rideout	47	3.4	−4.4
Majority		233	16.9	
Turnout		1,375	26.4	−7.9
Labour gain from UKIP		Swing	+10.1	
