= 2010 Harlow District Council election =

- 6 May 2010

11 of the 33 seats to Harlow District Council 17 seats needed for a majority
	First party	Second party	Third party
Party	Conservative	Labour	Liberal Democrats
Last election	19	6	8
Seats before	19	6	8
Seats won	5	6	0
Seats after	18	10	5
Seat change	▼1	▲4	▼3
Popular vote	15,837	13,815	8,194
Percentage	41.6%	36.3%	21.5%
- Map showing the results of contested wards in the 2010 Harlow District Council elections.
Council control before election
Conservative
Council control after election
Conservative

The 2010 Harlow District Council election took place on 6 May 2010 to elect members of Harlow District Council in Essex, England. One third of the council was up for election and the Conservative Party stayed in overall control of the council.

After the election, the composition of the council was:

- Conservative 18
- Labour 10
- Liberal Democrats 5

== Background ==
The Conservative Party gained a majority on the council at the last election in 2008 and after the election had 19 councillors, compared to 8 for the Liberal Democrats and 6 for Labour. In April 2009 the Liberal Democrats gained a seat in Staple Tye after a by-election, which had previously been held by independent David Kirton, who had been elected as a Conservative but suspended from the party in October 2008. However, in September 2009 councillor Linda Pailing of Netteswell ward left the Liberal Democrats to become an independent and then would go on to join the Conservatives in January 2010.

== Election result ==
At the same time as the Conservative Party gained the Harlow parliamentary constituency from Labour at the 2010 general election, the party also held control of Harlow council. However Labour made gains to win 6 of the 11 seats contested, while the Liberal Democrats lost the seats of Bush Fair, Mark Hall and Staple Tye.

Harlow local election result 2010
Party	Seats	Gains	Losses	Net gain/loss	Seats %	Votes %	Votes	+/−
Labour	6	4	0	▲4	54.5	36.3	13,815	▲8.9
Conservative	5	1	2	▼1	45.5	41.6	15,837	▼9.3
Liberal Democrats	0	0	3	▼3	0.0	21.5	8,194	▲0.7
Independent	0	0	0	Steady	0.0	0.5	186	▲0.2

== Ward results ==
=== Bush Fair ===
Location of Bush Fair ward

Bush Fair
Party	Candidate	Votes	%	±%
Labour	Helen Hart	1,254	36.4	+4.8
Liberal Democrats	Paulette Alexander	1,134	33.0	−8.6
Conservative	Daniel Lucia	1,053	30.6	+3.8
Majority		120	3.5	
Turnout		3,441	61.7	+25.5
Labour gain from Liberal Democrats		Swing		

=== Church Langley ===
Location of Church Langley ward

Church Langley
Party	Candidate	Votes	%	±%
Conservative	Tony Hall	2,718	62.9	−13.5
Labour	Kenneth Lawrie	1,004	23.2	+8.7
Liberal Democrats	Shinjita Basu	600	13.9	+4.7
Majority		1,714	39.7	−22.2
Turnout		4,322	67.6	+39.3
Conservative hold		Swing		

=== Great Parndon ===
Location of Great Parndon ward

Great Parndon
Party	Candidate	Votes	%	±%
Conservative	Joshua Jolles	1,688	47.7	−16.1
Labour	Norman Knight	1,276	36.1	+9.9
Liberal Democrats	Pauline Bell	573	16.2	+6.2
Majority		412	11.6	−26.0
Turnout		3,537	68.2	+33.0
Conservative hold		Swing		

=== Harlow Common ===
Location of Harlow Common ward

Harlow Common
Party	Candidate	Votes	%	±%
Labour	Maggie Hulcoop	1,448	40.1	+9.6
Conservative	John Steer	1,398	38.7	−7.9
Liberal Democrats	Laura Rideout	578	16.0	−4.3
Independent	Gary Roberts	186	5.2	+2.6
Majority		50	1.4	
Turnout		3,610	65.5	+28.3
Labour hold		Swing		

=== Little Parndon and Hare Street ===
Location of Little Parndon and Hare Street ward

Little Parndon and Hare Street
Party	Candidate	Votes	%	±%
Labour	Tony Durcan	1,635	46.5	+4.9
Conservative	Linda Pailing	1,267	36.0	−12.8
Liberal Democrats	Kuzna Jackson	613	17.4	+7.8
Majority		368	10.5	
Turnout		3,515	61.2	+29.5
Labour hold		Swing		

=== Mark Hall ===
Location of Mark Hall ward

Mark Hall
Party	Candidate	Votes	%	±%
Labour	Paul Sztumpf	1,145	35.6	+6.0
Liberal Democrats	Robert Thurston	1,114	34.6	−2.2
Conservative	Conrad Nowikow	961	29.8	−3.8
Majority		31	1.0	
Turnout		3,220	63.4	+23.5
Labour gain from Liberal Democrats		Swing		

=== Netteswell ===
Location of Netteswell ward

Netteswell
Party	Candidate	Votes	%	±%
Labour	Michael Danvers	1,329	41.1	+12.9
Conservative	Daniel Margetson	1,042	32.3	−3.3
Liberal Democrats	James Rideout	860	26.6	−3.6
Majority		287	8.9	
Turnout		3,231	59.0	+23.3
Labour gain from Conservative		Swing		

=== Old Harlow ===
Location of Old Harlow ward

Old Harlow
Party	Candidate	Votes	%	±%
Conservative	Michael Garnett	1,855	51.8	−13.6
Labour	Charles Cochrane	1,139	31.8	+10.2
Liberal Democrats	Simon MacNeill	584	16.3	+3.3
Majority		716	20.0	−23.8
Turnout		3,578	68.8	+34.9
Conservative hold		Swing		

=== Staple Tye ===
Location of Staple Tye ward

Staple Tye
Party	Candidate	Votes	%	±%
Conservative	Guy Mitchinson	1,083	36.7	−13.9
Labour	Dennis Palmer	1,021	34.6	+18.4
Liberal Democrats	Sally Sambridge	848	28.7	−4.5
Majority		62	2.1	−15.3
Turnout		2,952	57.8	+25.5
Conservative gain from Liberal Democrats		Swing		

=== Sumners and Kingsmoor ===
Location of Summers and Kingsmoor ward

Sumners and Kingsmoor
Party	Candidate	Votes	%	±%
Conservative	Nicholas Churchill	1,506	45.6	−19.7
Labour	Paul Schroder	1,107	33.5	+9.3
Liberal Democrats	Sue Woodlands	688	20.8	+10.3
Majority		399	12.1	−29.0
Turnout		3,301	60.8	+30.0
Conservative hold		Swing		

=== Toddbrook ===
Location of Toddbrook ward

Toddbrook
Party	Candidate	Votes	%	±%
Labour	Rod Truan	1,457	43.8	+8.7
Conservative	David Carter	1,266	38.1	−17.9
Liberal Democrats	Christopher Robins	602	18.1	+9.2
Majority		191	5.7	
Turnout		3,325	61.8	+25.4
Labour gain from Conservative		Swing		
