= Jolle =

Jolle may refer to:

== People ==
- Annasaheb Jolle (born 1963), Indian politician
- Shashikala Annasaheb Jolle (born 1969), Indian social worker and politician

== Other uses ==
- O-Jolle, Olympic sailing class

== See also ==
- Jolles
