= 2002 Harlow District Council election =

← 2000	2 May 2002	2003 →

11 of the 33 seats to Harlow District Council 17 seats needed for a majority
	First party	Second party	Third party
Party	Conservative	Liberal Democrats	Labour
Seats before	8	8	26
Seats won	12	12	9
Seats after	12	12	9
Seat change	▲4	▲4	▼17
Popular vote	19,201	17,943	22,752
Percentage	31.8%	29.7%	37.7%
- Map showing the results of contested wards in the 2002 Harlow District Council elections.
Council control before election
Labour
Council control after election
No overall control

The 2002 Harlow District Council election took place on 2 May 2002 to elect members of Harlow District Council in Essex, England. The whole council was up for election with boundary changes since the last election in 2000 reducing the number of seats by 9. The Labour Party lost overall control of the council to no overall control.

== Background ==
Before the election Labour controlled the council with 25 councillors, compared to 8 each for the Conservatives and Liberal Democrats, while there was 1 independent councillor. Boundary changes took effect for the 2002 election, reducing the number of councillors from 42 to 33 and the number of wards from 16 to 11 and meaning that the whole council was to be elected.

11 Labour and 1 Conservative councillors stood down at the election, including the Labour assistant leader Derek Fenny and a former council chairman Terry Abel.

== Election results ==
Labour were reduced by 16 seats and thereby lost overall control of the council. Overall turnout at the election was 36.84%.

Following the election the Conservative and Liberal Democrat leaders, Andrew Johnson and Lorna Spenceley, made an agreement to be joint leaders of the council.

Harlow local election result 2002
Party	Seats	Gains	Losses	Net gain/loss	Seats %	Votes %	Votes	+/−
Conservative	12			▲4	36.4	31.8	19,201	▼4.2
Liberal Democrats	12			▲4	36.4	29.7	17,943	▲3.5
Labour	9			▼16	27.3	37.7	22,752	▲1.5
Socialist Alliance	0			Steady	0.0	0.6	363	▲0.6
Independent	0			▼1	0.0	0.2	118	▲0.2

== Ward results ==
=== Bush Fair (3 seats) ===
Location of Bush Fair ward

Bush Fair (3 seats)
Party	Candidate	Votes	%
Liberal Democrats	Eleanor Macy	1,086	
Liberal Democrats	Christopher Robins	1,082	
Liberal Democrats	Christopher Millington	1,071	
Labour	David Cameron	868	
Labour	Alan Jones	845	
Labour	John Sullivan	838	
Conservative	Kevin Bailey	224	
Conservative	David Carter	219	
Conservative	Simon O’Connor	215	
Socialist Alliance	Peter Brown	87	
Turnout		6,535	40

=== Church Langley (3 seats) ===
Location of Church Langley ward

Church Langley (3 seats)
Party	Candidate	Votes	%
Conservative	Samantha Warren	1,164	
Conservative	Simon Carter	1,125	
Conservative	Anthony Hall	1,110	
Labour	Tina Baker	340	
Labour	Grace Matthews	273	
Labour	Jacqueline Sully	268	
Liberal Democrats	Richard Clements	192	
Liberal Democrats	Zena Faccini	175	
Liberal Democrats	Kuzna Jackson	158	
Turnout		4,805	28

=== Great Parndon (3 seats) ===
Location of Great Parndon ward

Great Parndon (3 seats)
Party	Candidate	Votes	%
Conservative	Joshua Jolles	894	
Conservative	Edward Johnson	892	
Conservative	Patrick McClarnon	892	
Labour	Edmund Gray	725	
Labour	Robert Eschle	696	
Labour	Feroz Khan	656	
Liberal Democrats	Robert Glendenning	281	
Liberal Democrats	Lesley Rideout	274	
Liberal Democrats	Robert Tinsley	257	
Turnout		5,567	36

=== Harlow Common (3 seats) ===
Location of Harlow Common ward

Harlow Common (3 seats)
Party	Candidate	Votes	%
Labour	Margaret Hulcoop	947	
Labour	Gregory Peck	867	
Labour	Mark Wilkinson	863	
Conservative	Nora Arnott	760	
Conservative	Pamela Norton	736	
Conservative	Richard Glover	699	
Liberal Democrats	Audrey Curran	341	
Liberal Democrats	Stanley Curran	323	
Liberal Democrats	Peter Mabey	321	
Turnout		5,857	39

=== Little Parndon and Hare Street (3 seats) ===
Location of Little Parndon and Hare Street ward

Little Parndon and Hare Street (3 seats)
Party	Candidate	Votes	%
Labour	Leslie Bayliss	911	
Labour	John Jesse	884	
Labour	John Cave	859	
Conservative	Charles Ross	446	
Conservative	Sandra Crame	426	
Conservative	Vivien Ross	410	
Liberal Democrats	David Cholerton	390	
Liberal Democrats	Paul Lawton	350	
Liberal Democrats	Marion Dyer	311	
Socialist Alliance	John Hobbs	175	
Turnout		5,162	34

=== Mark Hall (3 seats) ===
Location of Mark Hall ward

Mark Hall (3 seats)
Party	Candidate	Votes	%
Liberal Democrats	Jane Steer	1,098	
Liberal Democrats	Matthew Shepherd	1,091	
Liberal Democrats	Nicholas Macy	1,075	
Labour	Edith Morris	791	
Labour	Sean Folan	782	
Labour	Caroline Carter	772	
Conservative	Judith Carter	276	
Conservative	Nicholas Carter	269	
Conservative	Emma Thomas	255	
Turnout		6,409	42.5

=== Netteswell (3 seats) ===
Location of Netteswell ward

Netteswell (3 seats)
Party	Candidate	Votes	%
Liberal Democrats	Robert Thurston	1,066	
Liberal Democrats	Ian Jackson	1,060	
Liberal Democrats	James Pailing	1,041	
Labour	Suzanne Ennifer	683	
Labour	Sandra Rootsey	653	
Labour	Valerie Sear	643	
Conservative	Alan Johnstone	242	
Conservative	Eileen Johnstone	234	
Conservative	Matthew Warren	206	
Socialist Alliance	Anthony Sullivan	101	
Turnout		5,929	37.5

=== Old Harlow (3 seats) ===
Location of Old Harlow ward

Old Harlow (3 seats)
Party	Candidate	Votes	%
Conservative	Michael Garnett	963	
Conservative	Christopher Ford	945	
Conservative	Sue Livings	878	
Labour	Charles Cochrane	735	
Labour	Paul Bellairs	645	
Labour	Patricia Larkin	645	
Liberal Democrats	Peter Barton	273	
Liberal Democrats	Simon MacNeill	272	
Liberal Democrats	Paul Westlake	205	
Turnout		5,561	41

=== Staple Tye (3 seats) ===
Location of Staple Tye ward

Staple Tye (3 seats)
Party	Candidate	Votes	%
Liberal Democrats	Lorna Spenceley	869	
Liberal Democrats	Susan Lawton	867	
Liberal Democrats	Michael Faccini	823	
Labour	Godfrey Hocking	329	
Labour	Jenny Holland	324	
Labour	Philip Liddle	305	
Conservative	Guy Mitchinson	245	
Conservative	Patricia Rauch	237	
Conservative	Robert Rauch	225	
Turnout		4,224	28

=== Sumners and Kingsmoor (3 seats) ===
Location of Summers and Kingsmoor ward

Sumners and Kingsmoor (3 seats)
Party	Candidate	Votes	%
Conservative	Nicholas Churchill	742	
Conservative	Mark Gough	714	
Conservative	Andrew Johnson	700	
Labour	Derek Eardley	634	
Labour	Valerie Clark	626	
Labour	Robert Long	623	
Liberal Democrats	Pauline Bell	232	
Liberal Democrats	Harry Ackland-Snow	208	
Liberal Democrats	Clive Enders	189	
Independent	Christopher Hill	118	
Turnout		4,786	30

=== Toddbrook (3 seats) ===
Location of Toddbrook ward

Toddbrook (3 seats)
Party	Candidate	Votes	%
Labour	Roy Collyer	947	
Labour	Kevin Brooks	897	
Labour	Robert Davis	878	
Conservative	Muriel Jolles	643	
Conservative	Andrew Shannon	620	
Conservative	Craig Thomas	595	
Liberal Democrats	Susan Cayford	339	
Liberal Democrats	Molly White	330	
Liberal Democrats	David Wright	293	
Turnout		5,542	36
