= 2007 Harlow District Council election =

← 2006	3 May 2007	2008 →

12 of the 33 seats to Harlow District Council 17 seats needed for a majority
	First party	Second party	Third party
Party	Conservative	Labour	Liberal Democrats
Last election	12	11	10
Seats before	11	11	10
Seats won	6	4	2
Seats after	12	12	8
Seat change	▲1	▲1	▼2
Popular vote	9,876	6,876	4,362
Percentage	45.8%	31.9%	20.2%
	Fourth party
Party	Independent
Last election	0
Seats before	1
Seats won	0
Seats after	1
Seat change	0
Popular vote	204
Percentage	0.9%
- Map showing the results of contested wards in the 2007 Harlow District Council elections.
Council control before election
No overall control
Council control after election
No overall control

The 2007 Harlow District Council election took place on 3 May 2007 to elect members of Harlow District Council in Essex, England. One third of the council was up for election and the council stayed under no overall control.

After the election, the composition of the council was

- Conservative 12
- Labour 12
- Liberal Democrats 8
- Independent 1

== Background ==
After the last election in 2006 the Conservatives had 12 seats, Labour 11 and the Liberal Democrats 10. However, in January 2007 John Goddard left the Conservative group to sit as an independent, meaning that going into the 2007 election both the Conservative and Labour parties had 11 councillors.

12 seats were contested at the election, with 2 seats being available in Church Langley ward after Sam Warren stood down from the council.

== Election result ==
The Liberal Democrats lost 2 seats to fall to 8 councillors, 1 each to the Conservative and Labour parties, who both finished with 12 councillors. The closest result came in Toddbrook ward where Labour held the seat with a 15-vote majority over the Conservatives, while both the Conservative and Liberal Democrat group leaders, Andrew Johnson and Chris Millington won seats in Church Langley and Bush Fair wards respectively. Overall turnout at the election was 34.75%, down from 36.93% in 2006.

Following the election a coalition between Labour and the Liberal Democrats continued to run the council.

Harlow local election result 2007
Party	Seats	Gains	Losses	Net gain/loss	Seats %	Votes %	Votes	+/−
Conservative	6	1	0	▲1	50.0	45.8	9,876	▲5.6
Labour	4	1	0	▲1	33.3	31.9	6,876	▼0.2
Liberal Democrats	2	0	2	▼2	16.7	20.2	4,362	▼5.6
Respect	0	0	0	Steady	0	1.2	250	▲0.2
Independent	0	0	0	Steady	0	0.9	204	▼0.1

== Ward results ==
=== Bush Fair ===
Location of Bush Fair ward

Bush Fair
Party	Candidate	Votes	%	±%
Liberal Democrats	Christopher Millington	855	41.4	−7.3
Labour	Terry Brandon	796	38.5	+4.6
Conservative	Shona Johnson	414	20.0	+2.5
Majority		59	2.9	−11.9
Turnout		2,065	36.5	−2.6
Liberal Democrats hold		Swing		

=== Church Langley (2 seats) ===
Location of Church Langley ward

Church Langley (2 seats)
Party	Candidate	Votes	%	±%
Conservative	Andrew Johnson	1,266		
Conservative	Tony Hall	1,135		
Labour	Kenneth Lawrie	287		
Liberal Democrats	Laura Rideout	196		
Liberal Democrats	James Rideout	183		
Turnout		3,067	27.9	−4.1
Conservative hold		Swing		
Conservative hold		Swing		

=== Great Parndon ===
Location of Great Parndon ward

Great Parndon
Party	Candidate	Votes	%	±%
Conservative	Patrick McClarnon	1,011	55.1	+4.0
Labour	Norman Knight	617	33.6	+1.2
Liberal Democrats	Ian Rideout	208	11.3	−5.2
Majority		394	21.5	+2.8
Turnout		1,836	36.1	−2.5
Conservative hold		Swing		

=== Harlow Common ===
Location of Harlow Common ward

Harlow Common
Party	Candidate	Votes	%	±%
Labour	Mark Wilkinson	909	45.0	+4.8
Conservative	Clive Souter	879	43.5	+7.6
Liberal Democrats	Alan Lawrence	234	11.6	−1.5
Majority		30	1.5	−2.8
Turnout		2,022	37.6	−0.8
Labour hold		Swing		

=== Little Parndon and Hare Street ===
Location of Little Parndon and Hare Street ward

Little Parndon and Hare Street
Party	Candidate	Votes	%	±%
Labour	Jean Clark	881	49.2	+6.0
Conservative	Russell Perrin	700	39.1	+3.5
Liberal Democrats	Robert Pailing	211	11.8	−9.4
Majority		181	10.1	+2.5
Turnout		1,792	34.0	−1.5
Labour hold		Swing		

=== Mark Hall ===
Location of Mark Hall ward

Mark Hall
Party	Candidate	Votes	%	±%
Liberal Democrats	Lesley Rideout	752	36.5	−0.5
Labour	Michael Danvers	740	35.9	+0.2
Conservative	Jane Steer	570	27.6	+0.3
Majority		12	0.6	−0.7
Turnout		2,062	41.1	−2.6
Liberal Democrats hold		Swing		

=== Netteswell ===
Location of Netteswell ward

Netteswell
Party	Candidate	Votes	%	±%
Labour	Edna Stevens	642	34.7	+2.8
Conservative	Mark Gough	613	33.2	+7.4
Liberal Democrats	Jim Pailing	594	32.1	−10.2
Majority		29	1.5	
Turnout		1,849	34.9	−0.6
Labour gain from Liberal Democrats		Swing		

=== Old Harlow ===
Location of Old Harlow ward

Old Harlow
Party	Candidate	Votes	%	±%
Conservative	Sue Livings	976	54.5	−2.0
Labour	John Childs	398	22.2	−3.9
Liberal Democrats	Nick Macy	214	11.9	−5.5
Independent	Chris Ford	204	11.4	+11.4
Majority		578	32.3	+0.9
Turnout		1,792	37.2	−1.9
Conservative hold		Swing		

=== Staple Tye ===
Location of Staple Tye ward

Staple Tye
Party	Candidate	Votes	%
Conservative	Lee Dangerfield	685	42.8
Liberal Democrats	Christopher Robins	588	36.7
Labour	Dennis Palmer	329	20.5
Majority		97	6.1
Turnout		1,602	31.8
Conservative gain from Liberal Democrats			

=== Sumners and Kingsmoor ===
Location of Summers and Kingsmoor ward

Sumners and Kingsmoor
Party	Candidate	Votes	%	±%
Conservative	Sarah-Jane Dangerfield	857	55.5	+1.5
Labour	Suzanne Ennifer	482	31.2	+0.1
Liberal Democrats	Kuzna Jackson	205	13.3	−1.6
Majority		375	24.3	+1.4
Turnout		1,544	29.1	−1.9
Conservative hold		Swing		

=== Toddbrook ===
Location of Toddbrook ward

Toddbrook
Party	Candidate	Votes	%	±%
Labour	Bob Davis	795	41.0	+0.2
Conservative	David Carter	770	39.8	+1.7
Respect	Maureen Topley	250	12.9	+2.0
Liberal Democrats	Julian Watkiss	122	6.3	−3.9
Majority		25	1.2	−1.5
Turnout		1,937	37.4	−3.2
Labour hold		Swing		

== By-elections between 2007 and 2008 ==
=== Little Parndon and Hare Street ===
A by-election was held in Little Parndon and Hare Street on 25 October 2007 after the death of Labour councillor Jack Jesse. The seat was held for Labour by the former council leader Michael Danvers with a majority of 196 votes over the Conservatives.

Little Parndon and Hare Street by-election 25 October 2007
Party	Candidate	Votes	%	±%
Labour	Michael Danvers	794	52.6	+3.4
Conservative	Shona Johnson	598	39.6	+0.5
Liberal Democrats	Nicholas Macy	117	7.8	−4.0
Majority		196	13.0	+2.9
Turnout		1,509	28.4	−5.6
Labour hold		Swing		

=== Toddbrook ===
A by-election was held in Toddbrook ward on 25 October 2007 after the death of Labour councillor Roy Collyer. The seat was gained for the Conservatives by David Carter with a majority of 15 votes over Labour.

Toddbrook by-election 25 October 2007
Party	Candidate	Votes	%	±%
Conservative	David Carter	728	45.2	+5.4
Labour	Terry Brandon	713	44.3	+3.3
Respect	Maureen Topley	102	6.3	−6.6
Liberal Democrats	Julian Watkiss	67	4.2	−2.1
Majority		15	0.9	
Turnout		1,610	30.5	−6.9
Conservative gain from Labour		Swing		
