= 2004 Harlow District Council election =

District election

← 2003	10 June 2004	2006 →

11 of the 33 seats to Harlow District Council 17 seats needed for a majority
	First party	Second party	Third party
Party	Conservative	Labour	Liberal Democrats
Last election	12	9	12
Seats before	13	9	10
Seats won	4	5	2
Seats after	13	11	9
Seat change	Steady	▲2	▼1
Popular vote	6,531	6,812	4,494
Percentage	31.7%	33.1%	21.8%
	Fourth party
Party	Independent
Last election	0
Seats before	1
Seats won	0
Seats after	0
Seat change	▼1
Popular vote	2,399
Percentage	11.6%
- Map showing the results of contested wards in the 2004 Harlow District Council elections.
Council control before election
No overall control
Council control after election
No overall control

The 2004 Harlow District Council election took place on 10 June 2004 to elect members of Harlow District Council in Essex, England. One third of the council was up for election and the council stayed under no overall control.

After the election, the composition of the council was

- Conservative 13
- Labour 11
- Liberal Democrats 9

== Background ==
After the last election in 2003 both the Conservatives and Liberal Democrats had 12 seats, while Labour had 9 councillors. However, in July 2003 councillor Jane Steer defected from the Liberal Democrats to the Conservatives, making the Conservatives the largest group on the council for the first time in almost 50 years with 13 seats. The joint administration between the Conservatives and Liberal Democrats continued to run the council.

Meanwhile, in January 2004 the Liberal Democrat group on the council expelled Matthew Shepherd from the party's group on the council.

== Election result ==
Overall turnout at the election was 37%.

Harlow local election result 2004
Party	Seats	Gains	Losses	Net gain/loss	Seats %	Votes %	Votes	+/−
Labour	5	2	0	▲2	45.5	33.1	6,812	▼5.2
Conservative	4	0	0	Steady	36.4	31.7	6,531	▼1.0
Liberal Democrats	2	0	1	▼1	18.2	21.8	4,494	▼6.0
Independent	0	0	1	▼1	0	11.6	2,399	▲11.6
UKIP	0	0	0	Steady	0	1.8	364	▲1.8

== Ward results ==
=== Bush Fair ===
Location of Bush Fair ward

Bush Fair
Party	Candidate	Votes	%	±%
Labour	Robert Eschle	751	34.9	−8.8
Liberal Democrats	Christopher Robins	690	32.1	−14.4
Conservative	Guy Mitchinson	383	17.8	+8.0
Independent	William Henderson	325	15.1	+15.1
Majority		61	2.8	
Turnout		2,149	40.2	+8.9
Labour gain from Liberal Democrats		Swing		

=== Church Langley ===
Location of Church Langley ward

Church Langley
Party	Candidate	Votes	%	±%
Conservative	Simon Carter	1,073	61.6	−6.6
Liberal Democrats	Linda Pailing	400	22.9	+5.6
Labour	Kenneth Lawrie	270	15.5	+1.0
Majority		683	38.7	−12.2
Turnout		1,743	30.5	+8.0
Conservative hold		Swing		

=== Great Parndon ===
Location of Great Parndon ward

Great Parndon
Party	Candidate	Votes	%	±%
Conservative	Edward Johnson	775	40.0	−9.3
Labour	Suzanne Ennifer	612	31.6	−4.3
Independent	Raymond Statham	332	17.1	+17.1
Liberal Democrats	Ian Rideout	220	11.3	−3.4
Majority		163	8.4	−5.0
Turnout		1,939	38.9	+8.0
Conservative hold		Swing		

=== Harlow Common ===
Location of Harlow Common ward

Harlow Common
Party	Candidate	Votes	%	±%
Labour	Gregory Peck	785	39.1	−15.4
Conservative	Pamela Norton	654	32.6	+2.2
Independent	Gary Roberts	308	15.3	+15.3
Liberal Democrats	Clive Enders	262	13.0	−2.1
Majority		131	6.5	−17.6
Turnout		2,009	38.1	+9.0
Labour hold		Swing		

=== Little Parndon & Hare Street ===
Location of Little Parndon and Hare Street ward

Little Parndon & Hare Street
Party	Candidate	Votes	%	±%
Labour	John Jesse	869	46.7	−2.5
Conservative	Lee Dangerfield	589	31.6	+11.2
Liberal Democrats	John Steer	404	21.7	−4.2
Majority		280	15.1	−8.2
Turnout		1,862	37.2	+6.2
Labour hold		Swing		

=== Mark Hall ===
Location of Mark Hall ward

Mark Hall
Party	Candidate	Votes	%	±%
Labour	Sean Folan	800	38.9	+0.7
Liberal Democrats	Nicholas Macy	584	28.4	−16.4
Conservative	Christopher Lane	381	18.5	+5.1
Independent	Katrina Ray	290	14.1	+14.1
Majority		216	10.5	
Turnout		2,055	42.9	+9.3
Labour gain from Independent		Swing		

=== Netteswell ===
Location of Netteswell ward

Netteswell
Party	Candidate	Votes	%	±%
Liberal Democrats	Ian Jackson	627	34.1	−15.7
Labour	Feroz Khan	448	24.3	−8.2
UKIP	Anthony Bennett	364	19.8	+19.8
Conservative	Andrew Shannon	260	14.1	+1.8
Independent	Dean Weston	141	7.7	+7.7
Majority		179	9.8	−7.5
Turnout		1,840	36.4	+7.2
Liberal Democrats hold		Swing		

=== Old Harlow ===
Location of Old Harlow ward

Old Harlow
Party	Candidate	Votes	%	±%
Conservative	Muriel Jolles	748	37.7	−18.6
Independent	Colleen Morrison	534	26.9	+26.9
Labour	Paul Sztumpf	496	25.0	−4.9
Liberal Democrats	Simon MacNeill	208	10.5	−3.3
Majority		214	10.8	−15.6
Turnout		1,986	42.4	+7.9
Conservative hold		Swing		

=== Staple Tye ===
Location of Staple Tye ward

Staple Tye
Party	Candidate	Votes	%	±%
Liberal Democrats	Susan Lawton	583	38.2	−17.0
Labour	Caroline Carter	402	26.3	+0.1
Conservative	Peter Dobson	361	23.7	+5.1
Independent	David Lambert	180	11.8	+11.8
Majority		181	11.9	−17.1
Turnout		1,526	32.4	+9.7
Liberal Democrats hold		Swing		

=== Sumners and Kingsmoor ===
Location of Summers and Kingsmoor ward

Sumners and Kingsmoor
Party	Candidate	Votes	%	±%
Conservative	John Goddard	783	46.0	−2.2
Labour	Robert Long	623	36.6	−1.5
Liberal Democrats	Kuzna Jackson	295	17.3	+3.6
Majority		160	9.4	−0.7
Turnout		1,701	33.5	+8.1
Conservative hold		Swing		

=== Toddbrook ===
Location of Toddbrook ward

Toddbrook
Party	Candidate	Votes	%	±%
Labour	Kevin Brooks	756	42.2	−6.6
Conservative	Paul Richardson	524	29.3	−7.3
Independent	Rex Amor	289	16.1	+16.1
Liberal Democrats	Paul Westlake	221	12.3	−2.3
Majority		232	12.9	+0.7
Turnout		1,790	35.4	+5.8
Labour hold		Swing		
