= 2006 Harlow District Council election =

← 2004	4 May 2006	2007 →

12 of the 33 seats to Harlow District Council 17 seats needed for a majority
	First party	Second party	Third party
Party	Conservative	Labour	Liberal Democrats
Seats before	13	11	9
Seats won	4	3	5
Seats after	12	11	10
Seat change	▼1	0	▲1
Popular vote	8,737	6,968	5,606
Percentage	40.2%	25.0%	25.8%
- Map showing the results of contested wards in the 2006 Harlow District Council elections.
Council control before election
No overall control
Council control after election
No overall control

The 2006 Harlow District Council election took place on 4 May 2006 to elect members of Harlow District Council in Essex, England. One third of the council was up for election and the council stayed under no overall control.

After the election, the composition of the council was

- Conservative 12
- Labour 11
- Liberal Democrats 10

== Election result ==
Overall turnout at the election was 36.93%.

Harlow local election result 2006
Party	Seats	Gains	Losses	Net gain/loss	Seats %	Votes %	Votes	+/−
Liberal Democrats	5	1	0	▲1	41.7	25.8	5,606	▲4.0
Conservative	4	0	1	▼1	33.3	40.2	8,737	▲8.5
Labour	3	0	0	0	25.0	32.1	6,968	▼1.0
Respect	0	0	0	0	0	1.0	217	▲1.0
Independent	0	0	0	0	0	1.0	211	▼10.6

== Ward results ==
=== Bush Fair ===
Location of Bush Fair ward

Bush Fair
Party	Candidate	Votes	%	±%
Liberal Democrats	Eleanor Macy	995	48.7	+16.6
Labour	Edna Stevens	693	33.9	−1.0
Conservative	Graham Smith	357	17.5	−0.3
Majority		302	14.8	
Turnout		2,045	39.1	−1.1
Liberal Democrats hold		Swing		

=== Church Langley ===
Location of Church Langley ward

Church Langley
Party	Candidate	Votes	%	±%
Conservative	Samantha Warren	1,387	73.3	+11.7
Labour	Kenneth Lawrie	298	15.8	+0.3
Liberal Democrats	Robert Pailing	206	10.9	−12.0
Majority		1,089	57.5	+18.8
Turnout		1,891	32.0	+1.5
Conservative hold		Swing		

=== Great Parndon ===
Location of Great Parndon ward

Great Parndon
Party	Candidate	Votes	%	±%
Conservative	Joshua Jolles	960	51.1	+11.1
Labour	Norman Knight	608	32.4	+0.8
Liberal Democrats	Ian Rideout	309	16.5	+5.2
Majority		352	18.7	+10.3
Turnout		1,877	38.6	−0.3
Conservative hold		Swing		

=== Harlow Common ===
Location of Harlow Common ward

Harlow Common
Party	Candidate	Votes	%	±%
Labour	Margaret Hulcoop	789	40.2	+1.1
Conservative	Michelle Dorling	706	35.9	+3.3
Liberal Democrats	Alan Lawrence	258	13.1	+0.1
Independent	Gary Roberts	211	10.7	−4.6
Majority		83	4.3	−2.2
Turnout		1,964	38.4	+0.3
Labour hold		Swing		

=== Little Parndon & Hare Street ===
Location of Little Parndon and Hare Street ward

Little Parndon & Hare Street
Party	Candidate	Votes	%	±%
Labour	Anthony Durcan	743	43.2	−3.5
Conservative	Lee Dangerfield	613	35.6	+4.0
Liberal Democrats	Richard Farnsworth	365	21.2	−0.5
Majority		130	7.6	−7.5
Turnout		1,721	35.5	−1.7
Labour hold		Swing		

=== Mark Hall ===
Location of Mark Hall ward

Mark Hall
Party	Candidate	Votes	%	±%
Liberal Democrats	Robert Thurston	761	37.0	+8.6
Labour	Michael Danvers	735	35.7	−4.2
Conservative	Jane Steer	562	27.3	+8.8
Majority		26	1.3	
Turnout		2,058	43.7	+0.8
Liberal Democrats gain from Conservative		Swing		

=== Netteswell ===
Location of Netteswell ward

Netteswell
Party	Candidate	Votes	%	±%
Liberal Democrats	Linda Pailing	736	42.3	+8.2
Labour	Feroz Khan	555	31.9	+7.6
Conservative	Valerie Gough	448	25.8	+11.7
Majority		181	10.4	+0.6
Turnout		1,739	35.5	−0.9
Liberal Democrats hold		Swing		

=== Old Harlow ===
Location of Old Harlow ward

Old Harlow
Party	Candidate	Votes	%	±%
Conservative	Michael Garnett	1,033	56.5	+18.8
Labour	Paul Sztumpf	477	26.1	+1.1
Liberal Democrats	Nicholas Macy	318	17.4	+6.9
Majority		556	30.4	+19.6
Turnout		1,828	39.1	−3.3
Conservative hold		Swing		

=== Staple Tye (2 seats) ===
Location of Staple Tye ward

Staple Tye (2 seats)
Party	Candidate	Votes	%
Liberal Democrats	Lorna Spenceley	629	
Liberal Democrats	Christopher Robins	595	
Conservative	Clive Souter	536	
Conservative	Mark Gough	534	
Labour	Dennis Palmer	388	
Labour	Jenny Holland	386	
Turnout		3,068	
Liberal Democrats hold			
Liberal Democrats hold			

=== Sumners and Kingsmoor ===
Location of Summers and Kingsmoor ward

Sumners and Kingsmoor
Party	Candidate	Votes	%	±%
Conservative	Nicholas Churchill	842	54.0	+8.0
Labour	Suzanne Ennifer	484	31.1	−5.5
Liberal Democrats	Kuzna Jackson	232	14.9	−2.4
Majority		358	22.9	+13.5
Turnout		1,558	31.0	−2.5
Conservative hold		Swing		

=== Toddbrook ===
Location of Toddbrook ward

Toddbrook
Party	Candidate	Votes	%	±%
Labour	Roy Collyer	812	40.8	−1.4
Conservative	David Carter	759	38.1	+8.8
Respect	James Rogers	217	10.9	+10.9
Liberal Democrats	Paul Westlake	202	10.2	−2.1
Majority		53	2.7	−10.2
Turnout		1,990	40.6	+5.2
Labour hold		Swing		
