= Zechariah Isaiah Jolles =

19th-century rabbinical scholar and writer

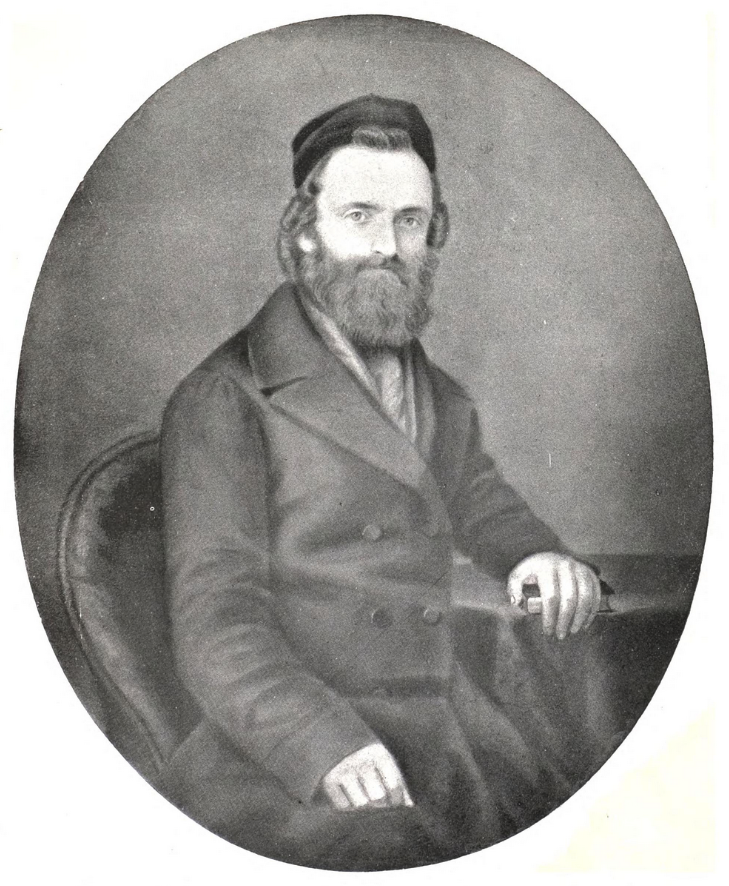
- Born: July 23, 1814; Lemberg, Austrian Empire
- Died: May 14, 1852 (aged 37); Minsk, Minsk Governorate, Russian Empire
- Writing career
- Language: Hebrew
- Literary movement: Haskalah

Zechariah Isaiah Jolles (Yiddish: זכריה ישעיה יאללעס, romanized: Zekharyah Yeshayah Yolles; July 23, 1814 – May 14, 1852) was a rabbinical scholar and writer.

== Biography ==
Zechariah Isaiah Jolles was born into a prominent family in Lemberg around 1814. He settled in Minsk in 1834 after marrying the daughter of Jacob Dokshitzer, one of the wealthiest Jews of that city.

Though Jolles sympathized with the Haskalah movement, he criticized Maskilim who "who had forgotten Torah" alongside rabbinical scholars who eschewed secular knowledge. He reportedly sided with Max Lilienthal when the latter visited Minsk in 1844 to convince the Jews to establish schools in accordance with the governmental program.

Jolles' published works include Dover mesharim (Lemberg, 1831), on the Haggahot ha-Shas attributed to Mordecai Jaffe, and Et le-dabber (Lemberg, 1834), an epistle to candidates for the rabbinate. He also wrote novellæ on the code of Maimonides and responsa, published posthumously by his son Süssman Jolles under the title Zekher Yeshayahu, and is said to have written more than twenty-five other works on rabbinical and academic subjects. Some of his other writings, including letters, poetry, and mathematical works, were published as Sefer ha-Torah ve-ha-ḥokhmah in 1913.

== Publications ==
- Dover mesharim. Lemberg. 1831.
- Et le-dabber. Lemberg. 1834.
- Zekher Yeshayahu. Vol. 1–2. Vilna. 1881.
- Sefer ha-Torah ve-ha-ḥokhmah. 1913.
