= 2003 Harlow District Council election =

← 2002	1 May 2003	2004 →

11 of the 33 seats to Harlow District Council 17 seats needed for a majority
	First party	Second party	Third party
Party	Conservative	Liberal Democrats	Labour
Seats before	12	12	9
Seats won	4	4	3
Seats after	12	12	9
Seat change	0	0	0
Popular vote	4,610	3,915	5,394
Percentage	32.7%	27.8%	38.3%
- Map showing the results of contested wards in the 2003 Harlow District Council elections.
Council control before election
No overall control
Council control after election
No overall control

The 2003 Harlow District Council election took place on 1 May 2003 to elect members of Harlow District Council in Essex, England. One third of the council was up for election and the council stayed under no overall control.

After the election, the composition of the council was

- Conservative 12
- Liberal Democrats 12
- Labour 9

== Background ==
Before the election both the Conservatives and Liberal Democrats had 12 councillors, while Labour had 9 seats.

A total of 36 candidates stood for the 11 seats that were being contested, with the councillors who got the lowest number of votes from the 2002 election defending their seats. One Labour councillor, John Cave, stood down at the election after 32 years, while 3 former Labour councillors and 1 former Liberal Democrat councillor attempted to regain seats. Among the councillors defending their seats was the Conservative group leader Andrew Johnson in Sumners and Kingsmoor ward.

== Election result ==
There was no change in the party situation on the council with no party gaining a majority. The closest result was in Bush Fair ward where Liberal Democrat Chris Millington held the seat by 39 votes, but the Liberal Democrat council chairman Nick Macy was not re-elected after contesting the Labour held seat in Little Parndon and Hare Street. Overall turnout at the election was 29%.

However an enquiry was started after the election as 3,279 postal votes had to be rejected as they did not have an official mark on them.

Harlow local election result 2003
Party	Seats	Gains	Losses	Net gain/loss	Seats %	Votes %	Votes	+/−
Conservative	4	0	0	Steady	36.4	32.7	4,610	▲0.9
Liberal Democrats	4	0	0	Steady	36.4	27.8	3,915	▼1.9
Labour	3	0	0	Steady	27.3	38.3	5,394	▲0.6
Socialist Alliance	0	0	0	Steady	0	1.3	181	▲0.7

== Ward results ==
=== Bush Fair ===
Location of Bush Fair ward

Bush Fair
Party	Candidate	Votes	%
Liberal Democrats	Christopher Millington	663	46.5
Labour	Terence Brandon	624	43.7
Conservative	Hazel Beckers	140	9.8
Majority		39	2.8
Turnout		1,427	31.3
Liberal Democrats hold			

=== Church Langley ===
Location of Church Langley ward

Church Langley
Party	Candidate	Votes	%
Conservative	Anthony Hall	705	68.2
Liberal Democrats	Molly White	179	17.3
Labour	Tina Baker	150	14.5
Majority		526	50.9
Turnout		1,034	22.5
Conservative hold			

=== Great Parndon ===
Location of Great Parndon ward

Great Parndon
Party	Candidate	Votes	%
Conservative	Patrick McClarnon	706	49.3
Labour	Suzanne Ennifer	514	35.9
Liberal Democrats	Peter Barton	211	14.7
Majority		192	13.4
Turnout		1,431	30.9
Conservative hold			

=== Harlow Common ===
Location of Harlow Common ward

Harlow Common
Party	Candidate	Votes	%
Labour	Mark Wilkinson	725	54.5
Conservative	Nora Arnott	405	30.4
Liberal Democrats	Audrey Curran	201	15.1
Majority		320	24.1
Turnout		1,331	29.1
Labour hold			

=== Little Parndon & Hare Street ===
Location of Little Parndon and Hare Street ward

Little Parndon & Hare Street
Party	Candidate	Votes	%
Labour	Valerie Clark	707	49.2
Liberal Democrats	Nicholas Macy	372	25.9
Conservative	John Goddard	293	20.4
Socialist Alliance	John Hobbs	66	4.6
Majority		335	23.3
Turnout		1,438	31.0
Labour hold			

=== Mark Hall ===
Location of Mark Hall ward

Mark Hall
Party	Candidate	Votes	%
Liberal Democrats	Lesley Rideout	598	44.8
Labour	Sean Folan	510	38.2
Conservative	Callum Finlayson	179	13.4
Socialist Alliance	Robert Delbridge	48	3.6
Majority		88	6.6
Turnout		1,335	33.6
Liberal Democrats hold			

=== Netteswell ===
Location of Netteswell ward

Netteswell
Party	Candidate	Votes	%
Liberal Democrats	James Pailing	622	49.8
Labour	Feroz Khan	406	32.5
Conservative	Matthew Warren	153	12.3
Socialist Alliance	Josephine Clarke	67	5.4
Majority		216	17.3
Turnout		1,248	29.2
Liberal Democrats hold			

=== Old Harlow ===
Location of Old Harlow ward

Old Harlow
Party	Candidate	Votes	%
Conservative	Sue Livings	809	56.3
Labour	Robert Eschle	430	29.9
Liberal Democrats	Simon MacNeill	198	13.8
Majority		379	26.4
Turnout		1,437	34.5
Conservative hold			

=== Staple Tye ===
Location of Staple Tye ward

Staple Tye
Party	Candidate	Votes	%
Liberal Democrats	Michael Faccini	519	55.2
Labour	Sandra Rootsey	246	26.2
Conservative	Shona Souter	175	18.6
Majority		273	29.0
Turnout		940	22.7
Liberal Democrats hold			

=== Sumners and Kingsmoor ===
Location of Summers and Kingsmoor ward

Sumners and Kingsmoor
Party	Candidate	Votes	%
Conservative	Andrew Johnson	572	48.2
Labour	Derek Eardley	452	38.1
Liberal Democrats	Peter Mabey	163	13.7
Majority		120	10.1
Turnout		1,187	25.4
Conservative hold			

=== Toddbrook ===
Location of Toddbrook ward

Toddbrook
Party	Candidate	Votes	%
Labour	Robert Davis	630	48.8
Conservative	Muriel Jolles	473	36.6
Liberal Democrats	Paul Lawton	189	14.6
Majority		157	12.2
Turnout		1,292	29.6
Labour hold			
