= 2008 Harlow District Council election =

- 1 May 2008

11 of the 33 seats to Harlow District Council 17 seats needed for a majority
	First party	Second party	Third party
Party	Conservative	Liberal Democrats	Labour
Last election	12	8	12
Seats before	13	8	11
Seats won	9	2	0
Seats after	19	8	6
Seat change	▲6	Steady	▼5
Popular vote	10,372	5,582	4,238
Percentage	50.9%	27.4%	20.8%
	Fourth party
Party	Independent
Last election	1
Seats before	1
Seats won	0
Seats after	1
Seat change	▼1
Popular vote	53
Percentage	0.9%
- Map showing the results of contested wards in the 2008 Harlow District Council elections.
Council control before election
No overall control
Council control after election
Conservative

The 2008 Harlow District Council election took place on 1 May 2008 to elect members of Harlow District Council in Essex, England. One third of the council was up for election and the Conservative Party gained overall control of the council from no overall control.

After the election, including the delayed election in Harlow Common, the composition of the council was 19 Conservative, 8 Liberal Democrats 8, and 6 Labour.

== Background ==
After the last election in 2007 both the Conservative and Labour parties had 12 seats, the Liberal Democrats had 8 and there was 1 independent councillor. However, in October 2007 the Conservatives gained a seat from Labour in Toddbrook to move to 13 seats, while Labour dropped to 11.

Before the election the council was run by a coalition between Labour and the Liberal Democrats, which had held power in Harlow since 2004. Among the councillors to stand down at the election were Liberal Democrat Su Lawton of Staple Tye ward and independent, former Conservative, John Paul Goddard of Sumners and Kingsmoor.

The election in Harlow Common ward was delayed until 12 June 2008, after the death of Labour councillor Gregory Peck in April 2008.

== Election result ==
The Conservatives gained a majority on the council after gaining 5 seats on the day of the May election, while Labour lost 4 seats. The Conservatives took seats from Labour in Little Parndon and Hare Street and Toddbrook, from the Liberal Democrats in Netteswell and Staple Tye and from an independent in Sumners and Kingsmoor. This meant the Conservatives took 8 of the 10 seats contested and finished the day with 18 councillors.

Labour failed to win any seats and dropped to 6 councillors after also losing 2 seats to the Liberal Democrats. The Liberal Democrat gains from Labour came in Bush Fair and Mark Hall wards and meant they stayed on 8 councillors. Overall turnout at the election was 33.80%, down from 34.75% at the 2007 election.

The delayed election in Harlow Common took place on 12 June 2008 and the Conservatives gained another seat from Labour with a majority of 331 votes. This increased the Conservative's majority on the council to 5 seats, with them having 19 of the 33 councillors.

Harlow local election result 2008
Party	Seats	Gains	Losses	Net gain/loss	Seats %	Votes %	Votes	+/−
Conservative	9	6	0	▲6	81.8	50.9	10,372	▲5.1
Liberal Democrats	2	2	2	Steady	18.2	20.8	4,238	▲0.6
Labour	0	0	5	▼5	0.0	27.4	5,582	▼4.5
UKIP	0	0	0	Steady	0.0	0.6	115	▲0.6
Independent	0	0	1	▼1	0.0	0.3	53	▼0.6

The above totals include the delayed election in Harlow Common on 12 June 2008.

== Ward results ==
=== Bush Fair ===
Location of Bush Fair ward

Bush Fair
Party	Candidate	Votes	%	±%
Liberal Democrats	Manny Doku	860	41.6	+0.2
Labour	Terry Brandon	652	31.6	−6.9
Conservative	Michelle Dorling	554	26.8	+6.8
Majority		208	10.0	+7.1
Turnout		2,066	36.2	−0.3
Liberal Democrats gain from Labour		Swing		

=== Church Langley ===
Location of Church Langley ward

Church Langley
Party	Candidate	Votes	%	±%
Conservative	Simon Carter	1,366	76.4	
Labour	Ken Lawrie	259	14.5	
Liberal Democrats	Laura Rideout	164	9.2	
Majority		1,107	61.9	
Turnout		1,789	28.3	+0.4
Conservative hold		Swing		

=== Great Parndon ===
Location of Great Parndon ward

Great Parndon
Party	Candidate	Votes	%	±%
Conservative	Eddie Johnson	1,164	63.8	+8.7
Labour	Norman Knight	478	26.2	−7.4
Liberal Democrats	Aran Black	182	10.0	−1.3
Majority		686	37.6	+16.1
Turnout		1,824	35.2	−0.9
Conservative hold		Swing		

=== Little Parndon and Hare Street ===
Location of Little Parndon and Hare Street ward

Little Parndon and Hare Street
Party	Candidate	Votes	%	±%
Conservative	Shona Johnson	829	48.8	+9.7
Labour	Mike Danvers	708	41.6	−7.6
Liberal Democrats	Kuzna Jackson	163	9.6	−2.2
Majority		121	7.2	−2.9
Turnout		1,700	31.7	−2.3
Conservative gain from Labour		Swing		

=== Mark Hall ===
Location of Mark Hall ward

Mark Hall
Party	Candidate	Votes	%	±%
Liberal Democrats	Nick Macy	744	36.8	+0.3
Conservative	Jane Steer	681	33.6	+6.0
Labour	Sean Folan	599	29.6	−6.3
Majority		63	3.2	+2.6
Turnout		2,024	39.9	−1.2
Liberal Democrats gain from Labour		Swing		

=== Netteswell ===
Location of Netteswell ward

Netteswell
Party	Candidate	Votes	%	±%
Conservative	Mark Gough	681	35.6	+2.4
Liberal Democrats	Ian Jackson	579	30.2	−1.9
Labour	Dennis Palmer	540	28.2	−6.5
UKIP	Daniel Balding	115	6.0	+6.0
Majority		102	5.4	
Turnout		1,915	35.7	+0.8
Conservative gain from Liberal Democrats		Swing		

=== Old Harlow ===
Location of Old Harlow ward

Old Harlow
Party	Candidate	Votes	%	±%
Conservative	Muriel Jolles	1,129	65.4	+10.9
Labour	Paul Sztumpf	373	21.6	−0.6
Liberal Democrats	Simon Macneill	225	13.0	+1.1
Majority		756	43.8	+11.5
Turnout		1,727	33.9	−3.3
Conservative hold		Swing		

=== Staple Tye ===
Location of Staple Tye ward

Staple Tye
Party	Candidate	Votes	%	±%
Conservative	David Kirton	848	50.6	+7.8
Liberal Democrats	John Strachan	556	33.2	−3.5
Labour	Janice Fenny	272	16.2	−4.3
Majority		292	17.4	+11.3
Turnout		1,676	32.3	+0.5
Conservative gain from Liberal Democrats		Swing		

=== Sumners and Kingsmoor ===
Location of Summers and Kingsmoor ward

Sumners and Kingsmoor
Party	Candidate	Votes	%	±%
Conservative	Russell Perrin	1,097	65.3	+9.8
Labour	Sue Ennifer	406	24.2	−7.0
Liberal Democrats	Tim Sanderson	176	10.5	−2.8
Majority		691	41.1	+16.8
Turnout		1,679	30.8	+1.7
Conservative gain from Independent		Swing		

=== Toddbrook ===
Location of Toddbrook ward

Toddbrook
Party	Candidate	Votes	%	±%
Conservative	Joel Charles	1,064	56.0	+16.2
Labour	Bob Hickey	667	35.1	−5.9
Liberal Democrats	Julian Watkiss	170	8.9	+2.6
Majority		397	20.9	
Turnout		1,901	36.4	−1.0
Conservative gain from Labour		Swing		

=== Harlow Common delayed election ===
Harlow Common
Party	Candidate	Votes	%	±%
Conservative	Clive Souter	959	46.6	+3.1
Labour	Norman Knight	628	30.5	−14.5
Liberal Democrats	James Rideout	419	20.3	+8.7
Independent	Jim Pailing	53	2.6	+2.6
Majority		331	16.1	
Turnout		2,059	37.2	−0.4
Conservative gain from Labour		Swing		

== By-elections between 2008 and 2010 ==
A by-election was held in Staple Tye on 30 April 2009 after councillor David Kirton was disqualified for not attending any meetings for 6 months. David Kirton had been elected as a Conservative, but was suspended from the party in October 2008 after being charged by police and was then an independent councillor.

The seat was gained for the Liberal Democrats by John Strachan with a majority of 60 votes over the Conservatives.

Staple Tye by-election 30 April 2009
Party	Candidate	Votes	%	±%
Liberal Democrats	John Strachan	604	39.1	+5.9
Conservative	Lorriane Caldarella	544	35.3	−15.3
Labour	Dennis Palmer	329	21.3	+5.1
UKIP	Daniel Balding	66	4.3	+4.3
Majority		60	3.9	
Turnout		1,543	30	−2
Liberal Democrats gain from Independent		Swing		
