= 2000 United Kingdom local elections =

- 4 May 2000

All 36 metropolitan boroughs, 27 out of 46 unitary authorities, 89 out of 238 English districts, 1 directly elected mayor and 1 regional assembly
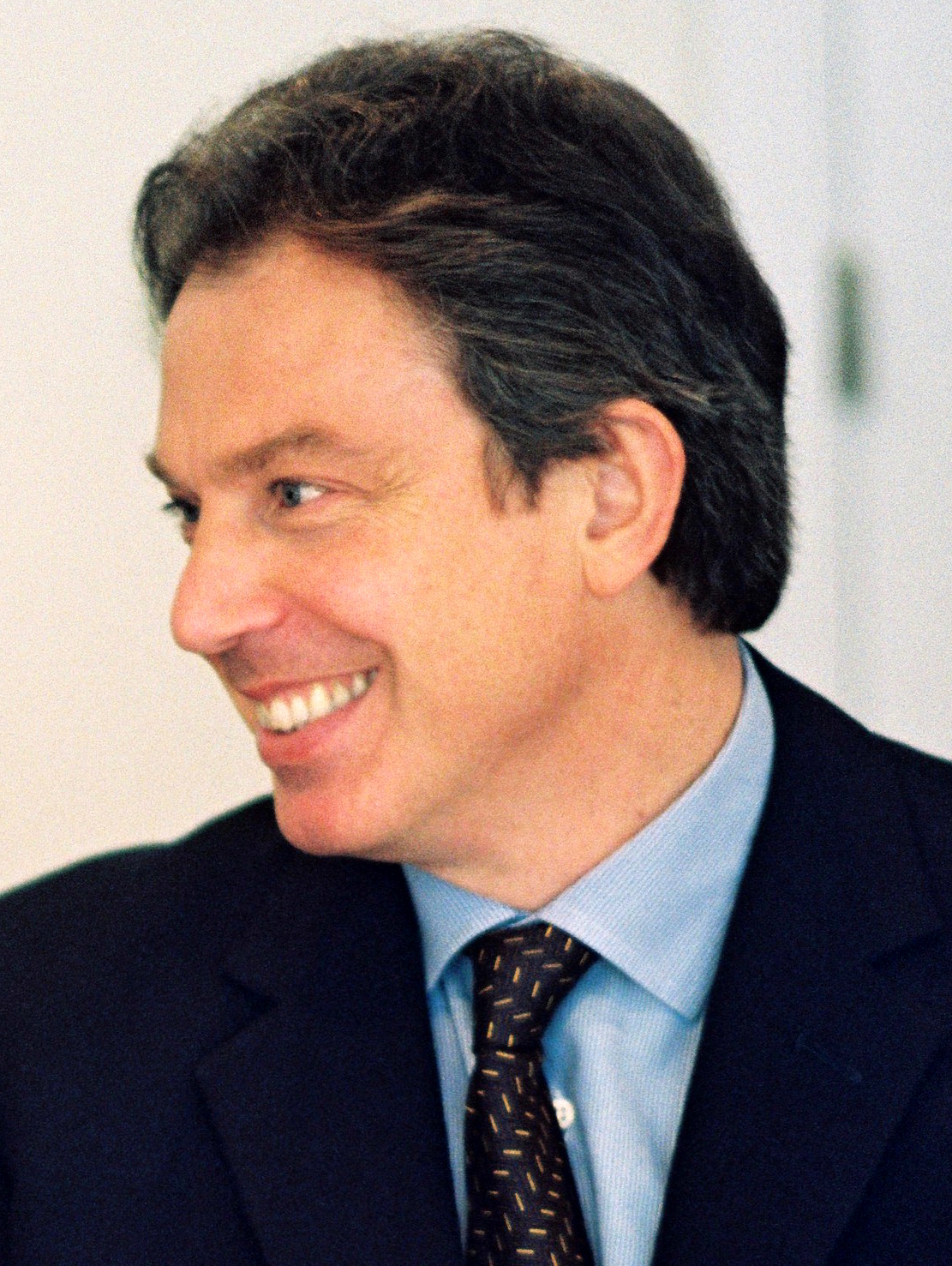

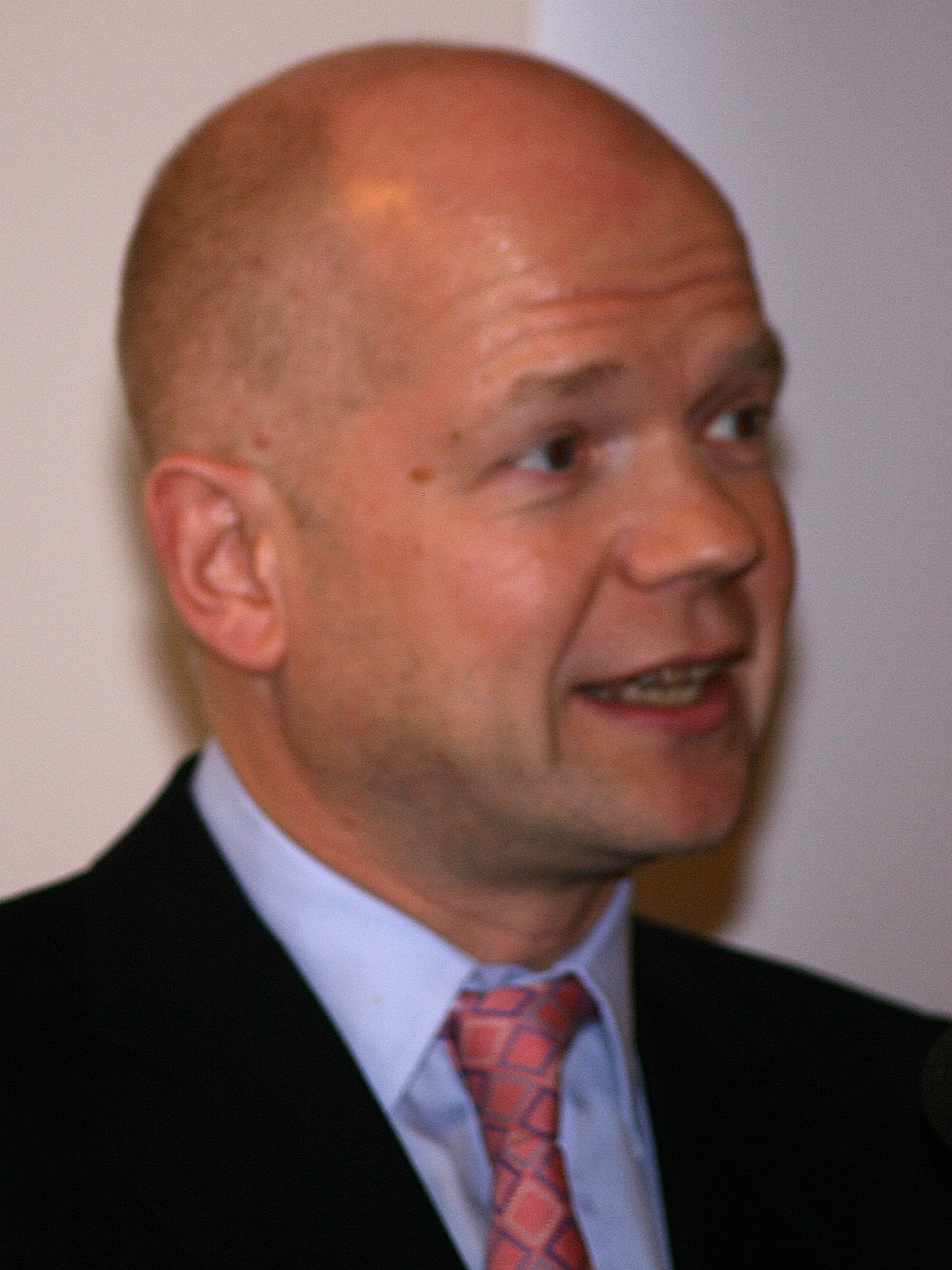

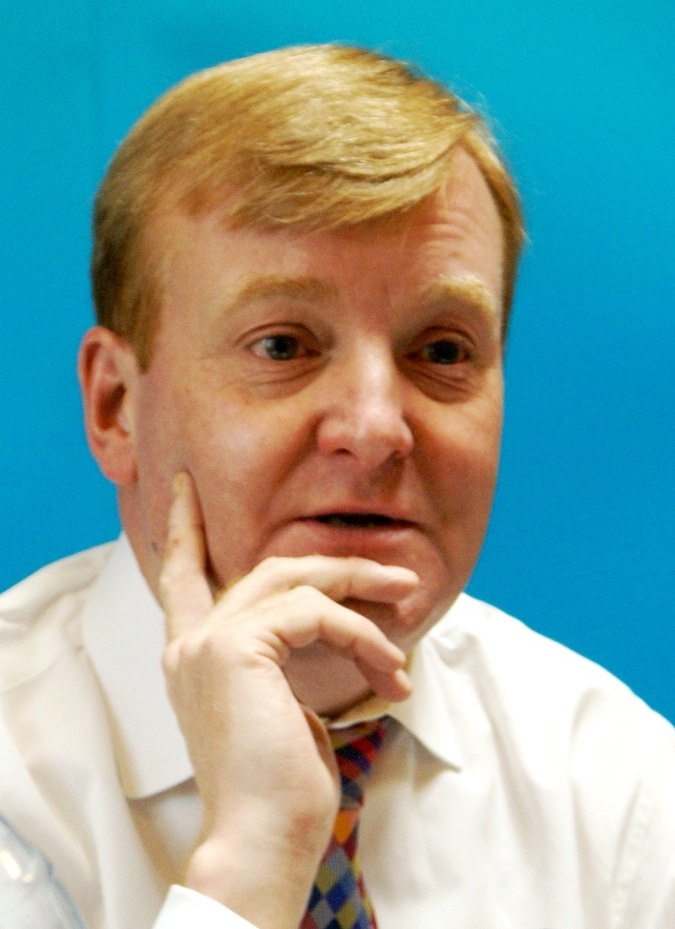
	Majority party	Minority party	Third party
Leader	Tony Blair	William Hague	Charles Kennedy
Party	Labour	Conservative	Liberal Democrats
Leader since	21 July 1994	19 June 1997	9 August 1999
Percentage	30%	32%	26%
Swing	▼6%	▼2%	▲2%
Councils	57	33	11
Councils +/-	▼16	▲16	▼1
Councillors	1,119	1,383	729
Councillors +/-	▼574	▲594	▼18
- Colours denote the winning party, as shown in the main table of results.

The 2000 United Kingdom local elections were held on Thursday 4 May 2000. A third of the seats on each of the Metropolitan Boroughs were elected along with elections in many of the unitary authorities and district councils. There were no elections in Scotland, Wales or Northern Ireland. On the same day, a parliamentary by-election took place in the Romsey constituency in southern England; the Liberal Democrats won the seat from the Conservatives.

== Results ==
Below is a summary of the results of the 2000 local elections.

Party	Councils				Councillors			
Party	Gain	Loss	Change	Total	Gain	Loss	Change	Total
Labour	1	17	▼–16	57	10	584	▼–574	1,119
Conservative	17	1	▲+16	33	608	14	▲+594	1,383
Liberal Democrats	2	3	▼-1	11	127	145	▼-18	729
Independent	0	0	0	0	45	41	▲+4	169
Others	0	0	0	0	19	16	▲+3	101
No overall control	16	15	▲+1	51	—	—	—	—

== England ==
=== Metropolitan boroughs ===
==== Whole council ====
In 1 English Metropolitan borough council the whole council was up for election.

Council	Previous control	Result	Details
Sefton ‡	No overall control	No overall control hold	Details

‡ New ward boundaries

==== Third of council ====
In 35 English Metropolitan borough councils, one third of the council was up for election.

Council	Previous control	Result	Details
Barnsley	Labour	Labour hold	Details
Birmingham	Labour	Labour hold	Details
Bolton	Labour	Labour hold	Details
Bradford	Labour	No overall control gain	Details
Bury	Labour	Labour hold	Details
Calderdale	No overall control	Conservative gain	Details
Coventry	Labour	Labour hold	Details
Doncaster	Labour	Labour hold	Details
Dudley	Labour	Labour hold	Details
Gateshead	Labour	Labour hold	Details
Kirklees	No overall control	No overall control hold	Details
Knowsley	Labour	Labour hold	Details
Leeds	Labour	Labour hold	Details
Liverpool	Liberal Democrats	Liberal Democrats hold	Details
Manchester	Labour	Labour hold	Details
Newcastle upon Tyne	Labour	Labour hold	Details
North Tyneside	Labour	Labour hold	Details
Oldham	Labour	Liberal Democrats gain	Details
Rochdale	Labour	Labour hold	Details
Rotherham	Labour	Labour hold	Details
Salford	Labour	Labour hold	Details
Sandwell	Labour	Labour hold	Details
Sheffield	Liberal Democrats	Liberal Democrats hold	Details
Solihull	No overall control	Conservative gain	Details
South Tyneside	Labour	Labour hold	Details
St Helens	Labour	Labour hold	Details
Stockport	Liberal Democrats	No overall control gain	Details
Sunderland	Labour	Labour hold	Details
Tameside	Labour	Labour hold	Details
Trafford	Labour	Labour hold	Details
Wakefield	Labour	Labour hold	Details
Walsall	Labour	No overall control gain	Details
Wigan	Labour	Labour hold	Details
Wirral	Labour	No overall control gain	Details
Wolverhampton	Labour	Labour hold	Details

=== Unitary authorities ===
==== Whole council ====
In 11 English Unitary authorities, the whole council was up for election.

Council	Previous control	Result	Details
Blackpool	Labour	Labour hold	Details
Bracknell Forest	Conservative	Conservative hold	Details
Herefordshire	Liberal Democrats	No overall control gain	Details
Medway	No overall control	No overall control hold	Details
Nottingham	Labour	Labour hold	Details
Plymouth	Labour	Conservative gain	Details
Swindon ‡	Labour	No overall control gain	Details
Telford and Wrekin	Labour	Labour hold	Details
Torbay	No overall control	Conservative gain	Details
West Berkshire	Liberal Democrats	Liberal Democrats hold	Details
Windsor and Maidenhead	Liberal Democrats	No overall control gain	Details

‡ New ward boundaries

==== Third of council ====
In 16 English Unitary authorities, one third of the council was up for election.

Council	Previous control	Result	Details
Blackburn with Darwen	Labour	Labour hold	Details
Derby	Labour	Labour hold	Details
Halton	Labour	Labour hold	Details
Hartlepool	Labour	No overall control gain	Details
Kingston upon Hull	Labour	Labour hold	Details
Milton Keynes	No overall control	No overall control hold	Details
Peterborough	No overall control	No overall control hold	Details
Portsmouth	Labour	No overall control gain	Details
Reading	Labour	Labour hold	Details
Slough	Labour	Labour hold	Details
Southampton	Labour	No overall control gain	Details
Southend-on-Sea	No overall control	Conservative gain	Details
Stoke-on-Trent	Labour	Labour hold	Details
Thurrock	Labour	Labour hold	Details
Warrington	Labour	Labour hold	Details
Wokingham	Conservative	No overall control gain	Details

=== District councils ===
==== Whole council ====
In 9 English district authorities, the whole council was up for election.

Council	Previous control	Result	Details
Amber Valley ‡	Labour	Conservative gain	Details
Elmbridge ‡	No overall control	No overall control hold	Details
Exeter ‡	Labour	Labour hold	Details
Malvern Hills	No overall control	Conservative gain	Details
Mole Valley ‡	No overall control	No overall control hold	Details
Reigate and Banstead ‡	No overall control	Conservative gain	Details
Runnymede ‡	Conservative	Conservative hold	Details
Tandridge ‡	No overall control	Conservative gain	Details
Woking ‡	No overall control	No overall control hold	Details

‡ New ward boundaries

==== Third of council ====
In 80 English district authorities, one third of the council was up for election.

Council	Previous control	Result	Details
Adur	No overall control	No overall control hold	Details
Barrow-in-Furness	No overall control	No overall control hold	Details
Basildon	Labour	No overall control gain	Details
Basingstoke and Deane	No overall control	No overall control hold	Details
Bassetlaw	Labour	Labour hold	Details
Bedford	No overall control	No overall control hold	Details
Brentwood	Liberal Democrats	Liberal Democrats hold	Details
Broadland	Conservative	Conservative hold	Details
Broxbourne	Conservative	Conservative hold	Details
Burnley	Labour	No overall control gain	Details
Cambridge	No overall control	Liberal Democrats gain	Details
Cannock Chase	Labour	Labour hold	Details
Carlisle	Conservative	Conservative hold	Details
Cheltenham	Conservative	Conservative hold	Details
Cherwell	No overall control	Conservative gain	Details
Chester	No overall control	No overall control hold	Details
Chorley	Labour	No overall control gain	Details
Colchester	No overall control	No overall control hold	Details
Congleton	Liberal Democrats	Liberal Democrats hold	Details
Craven	Conservative	Conservative hold	Details
Crawley	Labour	Labour hold	Details
Crewe and Nantwich	Labour	Labour hold	Details
Daventry	Conservative	Conservative hold	Details
Eastbourne	No overall control	Conservative gain	Details
Eastleigh	Liberal Democrats	Liberal Democrats hold	Details
Ellesmere Port and Neston	Labour	Labour hold	Details
Epping Forest	No overall control	No overall control hold	Details
Fareham	Conservative	Conservative hold	Details
Gloucester	Labour	Labour hold	Details
Gosport	No overall control	No overall control hold	Details
Great Yarmouth	Labour	Conservative gain	Details
Harlow	Labour	Labour hold	Details
Harrogate	Liberal Democrats	Liberal Democrats hold	Details
Hart	No overall control	No overall control hold	Details
Hastings	Labour	Labour hold	Details
Havant	No overall control	No overall control hold	Details
Hertsmere	Conservative	Conservative hold	Details
Huntingdonshire	Conservative	Conservative hold	Details
Hyndburn	No overall control	Conservative gain	Details
Ipswich	Labour	Labour hold	Details
Lincoln	Labour	Labour hold	Details
Macclesfield	Conservative	Conservative hold	Details
Maidstone	No overall control	No overall control hold	Details
Newcastle-under-Lyme	Labour	Labour hold	Details
North Hertfordshire	Conservative	Conservative hold	Details
Norwich	Labour	Labour hold	Details
Nuneaton and Bedworth	Labour	Labour hold	Details
Oxford	Labour	No overall control gain	Details
Pendle	No overall control	No overall control hold	Details
Penwith	No overall control	No overall control hold	Details
Preston	No overall control	No overall control hold	Details
Purbeck	Conservative	Conservative hold	Details
Redditch	Labour	Labour hold	Details
Rochford	No overall control	No overall control hold	Details
Rossendale	Labour	Conservative gain	Details
Rugby	No overall control	No overall control hold	Details
Rushmoor	No overall control	Conservative gain	Details
Shrewsbury and Atcham	No overall control	No overall control hold	Details
South Bedfordshire	No overall control	No overall control hold	Details
South Cambridgeshire	No overall control	No overall control hold	Details
South Lakeland	No overall control	No overall control hold	Details
St Albans	No overall control	No overall control hold	Details
Stevenage	Labour	Labour hold	Details
Stratford-on-Avon	No overall control	Conservative gain	Details
Stroud	No overall control	No overall control hold	Details
Swale	No overall control	No overall control hold	Details
Tamworth	Labour	Labour hold	Details
Three Rivers	Liberal Democrats	Liberal Democrats hold	Details
Tunbridge Wells	Conservative	Conservative hold	Details
Watford	Labour	No overall control gain	Details
Waveney	Labour	Labour hold	Details
Welwyn Hatfield	No overall control	Labour gain	Details
West Lancashire	Labour	Labour hold	Details
West Lindsey	No overall control	No overall control hold	Details
West Oxfordshire	No overall control	Conservative gain	Details
Weymouth and Portland	No overall control	No overall control hold	Details
Winchester	Liberal Democrats	Liberal Democrats hold	Details
Worcester	Labour	No overall control gain	Details
Worthing	Conservative	Conservative hold	Details
Wyre Forest	No overall control	No overall control hold	Details

=== Mayoral elections ===
Local Authority	Previous Mayor	Mayor-elect	Details
London	New Post	Ken Livingstone (Independent)	Details
