= 2002 North Tyneside Metropolitan Borough Council election =

2002 UK local government election

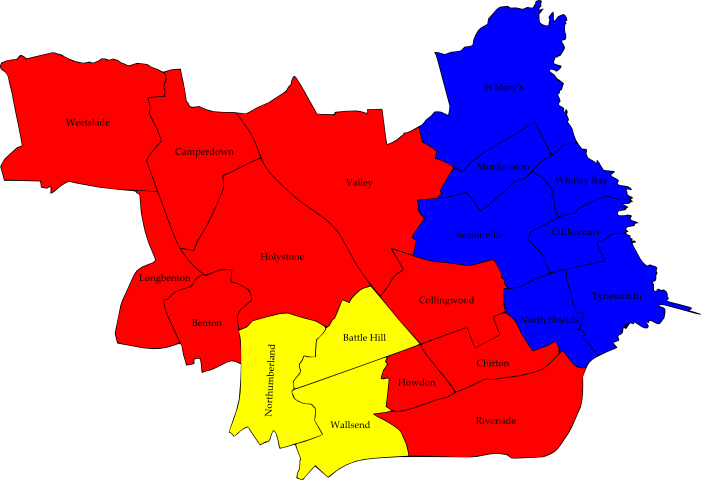
Map of the 2002 North Tyneside Council election results

Elections to North Tyneside Metropolitan Council took place on 2 May 2002 on the same day as other local council elections in England.

North Tyneside Council is elected "in thirds", which means one councillor from each three-member ward is elected each year for three years followed by a year with no election. On the same day, the election for the first directly elected Mayor of North Tyneside took place.

== Battle Hill ==
North Tyneside Council Elections: Battle Hill ward 2002
Party	Candidate	Votes	%	±%
Liberal Democrats	J Smith	1,788	51.4	
Labour	Tommy Mulvenna	1,333	38.3	
Conservative	E Smith	356	10.2	
Majority		455		

== Benton ==
North Tyneside Council Elections: Benton ward 2002
Party	Candidate	Votes	%	±%
Labour	P Latham	1,292	46.3	
Conservative	Brian McArdle	990	35.5	
Liberal Democrats	P Finlay	510	18.3	
Majority		302		

== Camperdown ==
North Tyneside Council Elections: Camperdown ward 2002
Party	Candidate	Votes	%	±%
Labour	D Newton	1,605	68.9	
Liberal Democrats	C Taylor	407	17.5	
Conservative	Amanda Newton	319	13.7	
Majority		1,198		

== Chirton ==
North Tyneside Council Elections: Chirton ward 2002
Party	Candidate	Votes	%	±%
Labour	M Smith	1,235	60.7	
Conservative	Toni Morgan	469	23.1	
Liberal Democrats	C Hindmarsh	330	16.2	
Majority		766		

== Collingwood ==
North Tyneside Council Elections: Collingwood ward 2002
Party	Candidate	Votes	%	±%
Labour	Margaret Hall	1,309	51.6	
Conservative	Miriam Smith	664	23.1	
Liberal Democrats	Dorothy Hindmarsh	330	16.2	
Majority		645		

== Cullercoats ==
North Tyneside Council Elections: Cullercoats ward 2002
Party	Candidate	Votes	%	±%
Conservative	L Goveas	2,404	56	
Labour	Keith Smiles	1,322	30.8	
Liberal Democrats	Dennis Woods	567	13.2	
Majority		1,082		

== Holystone ==
North Tyneside Council Elections: Holystone ward 2003
Party	Candidate	Votes	%	±%
Labour	B Flood	1,756	49.9	
Conservative	Alison Austin	979	27.8	
Liberal Democrats	Steven Conoboy	787	22.3	
Majority		777		

== Howdon ==
North Tyneside Council Elections: Howdon ward 2002
Party	Candidate	Votes	%	±%
Labour	D Charlton	1,146	51.9	
Liberal Democrats	S Farrell	891	40.4	
Conservative	John McGee	169	7.7	
Majority		255		

== Longbenton ==
North Tyneside Council Elections: Longbenton ward 2002
Party	Candidate	Votes	%	±%
Labour	K Conroy	1,221	63.8	
Liberal Democrats	M Finlay	415	21.7	
Conservative	Robin Underwood	278	14.5	
Majority		806		

== Monkseaton ==
North Tyneside Council Elections: Monkseaton ward 2002
Party	Candidate	Votes	%	±%
Conservative	J Bell	2,630	65.1	
Labour	Glen Stillaway	875	21.6	
Liberal Democrats	M Smith	538	13.3	
Majority		1,755		

== North Shields ==
North Tyneside Council Elections: North Shields ward 2002
Party	Candidate	Votes	%	±%
Conservative	R Goveas	2,096	52.7	
Labour	F Lott	1,410	35.4	
Liberal Democrats	A Farrell	475	11.9	
Majority		689		

== Northumberland ==
North Tyneside Council Elections: Northumberland ward 2002
Party	Candidate	Votes	%	±%
Liberal Democrats	David Ord	2,278	66.6	
Labour	Norma Playle	689	28.2	
Conservative	Marjorie Appleton	178	5.2	
Majority		1,314		

== Riverside ==
North Tyneside Council Elections: Riverside ward 2002
Party	Candidate	Votes	%	±%
Labour	M McGlade	1,248	58.4	
Liberal Democrats	James Smith	514	24	
Conservative	L Johnston	376	17.6	
Majority		734		

== Seatonville ==
North Tyneside Council Elections: Seatonville ward 2002
Party	Candidate	Votes	%	±%
Conservative	K Mewett	1,659	47.6	
Liberal Democrats	Dr Joan Harvey	1,007	28.3	
Labour	J Smith	857	24.1	
Majority		688		

== St Mary's ==
North Tyneside Council Elections: Seatonville ward 2002
Party	Candidate	Votes	%	±%
Conservative	Chris Morgan	3,026	72.1	
Liberal Democrats	Iain Campbell	656	15.6	
Labour	Mark Ormston	515	12.3	
Majority		2,511		

== Tynemouth ==
North Tyneside Council Elections: Tynemouth ward 2002
Party	Candidate	Votes	%	±%
Conservative	I Macaulay	1,938	58.9	
Labour	R Hill	906	27.5	
Liberal Democrats	K McGarrigle	446	13.6	
Majority		1,032		

== Valley ==
North Tyneside Council Elections: Valley ward 2002
Party	Candidate	Votes	%	±%
Labour	Carole Gamling	1,532	53.8	
Conservative	Pam McIntyre	685	24.2	
Liberal Democrats	C Hall	622	22	
Majority		838		

== Wallsend ==
North Tyneside Council Elections: Wallsend ward 2002
Party	Candidate	Votes	%	±%
Liberal Democrats	Michael Huscroft	1,731	66.8	
Labour	Alan Keith	760	29.3	
Conservative	Margaret Smith	99	3.8	
Majority		971		

== Weetslade ==
North Tyneside Council Elections: Weetslade ward 2002
Party	Candidate	Votes	%	±%
Labour	A Richardson	1,459	42.2	
Conservative	Alan Appleton	1,356	39.2	
Liberal Democrats	Raymond Taylor	640	18.5	
Majority		103		

== Whitley Bay ==
North Tyneside Council Elections: Whitley Bay ward 2002
Party	Candidate	Votes	%	±%
Conservative	K Fairs	1,519	52.1	
Labour	John Webb	709	24.3	
Liberal Democrats	A Campbell	398	13.6	
Independent	P Bell	292	10	
Majority		623	27.2	

Preceded by 2000 North Tyneside Metropolitan Borough Council election	North Tyneside local elections	Succeeded by 2003 North Tyneside Metropolitan Borough Council election
