= 2000 Torbay Council election =

2000 UK local government election

The 2000 Torbay Council election took place on 4 May 2000 to elect members of Torbay unitary authority in England. The whole council was up for election and the Conservative Party gained overall control of the council from no overall control.

== Campaign ==
The election was seen as being a straight fight between the Liberal Democrats and Conservatives. Before the election the Conservatives were optimistic that Torbay would be one of the councils that they would gain in the 2000 local elections and they targeted it as a council that they had to win. This emphasis on the council included two visits by William Hague the Conservative party leader. Pre-election the Liberal Democrats only had control of the council based on the casting vote of the mayor, while the Conservatives needed 5 gains to take control.

Conservative leaflets led with the theme of "Keep the Pound" but locally they accused the Liberal Democrat administration of incompetence and attacked the 22% Council Tax rise over the previous two years. The Liberal Democrats were also attacked over the council's decision to not put on any floral displays in 1999 to save money, which was seen as being an error for an area dependent on tourism. However the Liberal Democrats accused the Conservatives of playing on voters fears about asylum seekers being housed in the area.

== Election results ==
The results saw the Conservatives win 32 of the 36 seats on the council, with the Liberal Democrats reduced to just 4 seats after having run the council since 1991. Liberal Democrat losses included the leader of the council, Anne Williams, and the mayor, John Turner. The Labour Party lost both their seats on the council blaming a poor turnout at 33% and the recent rise of only 75 pence in the state pension for their defeat.

The result was seen as being an omen for the next general election, where the sitting Liberal Democrat member of parliament Adrian Sanders only had a majority of 12 over the Conservatives. However the 2001 general election would see the Liberal Democrats hold the parliamentary constituency with an increased majority.

Torbay local election result 2000
Party	Seats	Gains	Losses	Net gain/loss	Seats %	Votes %	Votes	+/−
Conservative	32			+19	88.9	58.9	51,091	
Liberal Democrats	4			-14	11.1	31.9	27,672	
Labour	0			-2	0.0	8.1	7,000	
Independent Ratepayers	0			0	0.0	0.6	508	
Best Value for Torbay	0			0	0.0	0.3	251	
Monster Raving Loony	0			0	0.0	0.2	177	
Independent	0			-3	0.0	N/A	0	

== Ward results ==
Blatchcombe (3)
Party	Candidate	Votes	%	±%
Conservative	Eric Abercrombie	866		
Conservative	Beverley Brennan	828		
Conservative	Olive Jarmain	827		
Liberal Democrats	Douglas Lentell	766		
Liberal Democrats	John Nicholls	757		
Liberal Democrats	Philip Whitehead	714		
Labour	Roger Ballinger	369		
Labour	Wayne Doidge	347		
Labour	Eric McCaig	328		
Turnout		5,802	24.9	

Cockington with Chelston (3)
Party	Candidate	Votes	%	±%
Conservative	Michael Hytche	1,688		
Conservative	Beryl McPhail	1,685		
Conservative	Christine Weston	1,628		
Liberal Democrats	Stewart Foulds	720		
Liberal Democrats	Jerome Betts	686		
Liberal Democrats	Neil King	647		
Labour	Rosalind Royle	376		
Turnout		7,430	35.8	

Coverdale (3)
Party	Candidate	Votes	%	±%
Conservative	John Goulden	1,232		
Conservative	Alan Hoyle	1,197		
Conservative	James O'Dwyer	1,187		
Liberal Democrats	Ann Williams	1,023		
Liberal Democrats	Richard James	917		
Liberal Democrats	Vincent McCann	911		
Labour	Brenda Hill	316		
Turnout		6,783		

Ellacombe (3)
Party	Candidate	Votes	%	±%
Conservative	Bruce Cowling	970		
Conservative	Peter Long	908		
Liberal Democrats	Elizabeth Midgley	787		
Liberal Democrats	John Davis	786		
Conservative	Alan Shepheard	768		
Liberal Democrats	John Dunn	750		
Independent Ratepayers	Lionel Digby	508		
Labour	Jonathan Haines	358		
Turnout		5,835		

Furzeham with Churston (3)
Party	Candidate	Votes	%	±%
Conservative	Robert Pudner	1,846		
Conservative	Nicholas Bye	1,831		
Conservative	Moira Tapperell	1,781		
Liberal Democrats	Andrea Colborne	486		
Labour	John Robinson	403		
Labour	Christopher Day	393		
Liberal Democrats	Marlene Brown	385		
Labour	William Loader	379		
Turnout		7,504		

Preston (3)
Party	Candidate	Votes	%	±%
Conservative	Jean Turnbull	1,999		
Conservative	Beverley Oxley	1,995		
Conservative	Ronald Morris	1,949		
Liberal Democrats	Timothy Nicholls	897		
Liberal Democrats	Linda Turner	871		
Liberal Democrats	John Pentney	729		
Labour	James Towell	335		
Turnout		8,775		

St Marychurch (3)
Party	Candidate	Votes	%	±%
Conservative	Heather Buckpitt	1,531		
Conservative	Paul Price	1,517		
Conservative	Donald Brook	1,490		
Liberal Democrats	Andrew Blake	1,272		
Liberal Democrats	Hilary Chambers	1,212		
Liberal Democrats	Roger Stringer	1,169		
Turnout		8,191		

St Michaels with Goodrington (3)
Party	Candidate	Votes	%	±%
Conservative	Penelope Barnby	1,991		
Conservative	Maureen	1,990		
Conservative	Keith Bryant	1,962		
Liberal Democrats	John Turner	1,133		
Liberal Democrats	Andrew Douglas-Dunbar	989		
Liberal Democrats	Doreen Urquart	935		
Labour	Edward Harris	394		
Turnout		9,394		

St Peters with St Marys (3)
Party	Candidate	Votes	%	±%
Conservative	Sally Jowett	1,339		
Conservative	Eileen Salloway	1,332		
Conservative	Alan Craig	1,285		
Labour	Michael Morey	931		
Labour	Irene Reade	624		
Labour	Peter Pimie	614		
Liberal Democrats	Frank Lomas	404		
Liberal Democrats	Stuart John	403		
Liberal Democrats	David Morris	387		
Turnout		7,319		

Shiphay (3)
Party	Candidate	Votes	%	±%
Liberal Democrats	Steve Darling	1,157		
Conservative	Mark Kingscote	1,120		
Liberal Democrats	Colin Charlwood	1,102		
Conservative	John Palmer	1,084		
Liberal Democrats	Alan Faulkner	1,082		
Conservative	Gert Eisner	1,057		
Labour	Stephen Turner	293		
Turnout		6,895		

Tormohun (3)
Party	Candidate	Votes	%	±%
Conservative	Damian Barton	994		
Liberal Democrats	Jennider Faulkner	924		
Conservative	Frances Harrison	917		
Conservative	Margaret Stafford	891		
Liberal Democrats	Michael Collins	787		
Liberal Democrats	Michael Wege	710		
Labour	Pauline Cartlidge	287		
Best Value for Torbay	Stanley Lewis	251		
Turnout		5,761		

Torwood (3)
Party	Candidate	Votes	%	±%
Conservative	Richard Cuming	1,838		
Conservative	Julian Chandler	1,805		
Conservative	Matthew Phillips	1,763		
Liberal Democrats	Kathleen Hawkins	441		
Liberal Democrats	Eric Blatchford	427		
Liberal Democrats	Adrian Treneary	306		
Labour	Edward Corrigam	253		
Monster Raving Loony	John Rowe	177		
Turnout		7,010		
