= 2000 Burnley Borough Council election =

2000 UK local government election

The 2000 Burnley Borough Council election took place on 4 May 2000 to elect members of Burnley Borough Council in Lancashire, England. One third of the council was up for election and the Labour Party lost overall control of the council to no overall control.

After the election, the composition of the council was:

- Labour 24
- Independent 12
- Liberal Democrat 9
- Conservative 3

== Campaign ==
The election saw 17 seats contested with 2 seats up for election in Gawthorpe ward after the resignation of a Labour councillor. In total 42 candidates stood in the election, with Labour defending 14 of the 17 seats being contested. When the candidates were announced there was controversy in Queensgate ward after the independent candidate, Pat Chadwick, claimed that an independent Conservative candidate had been put up to stand in the election by Labour. She claimed Labour were attempting to split her vote in order to ensure victory for Labour, however Labour described the claims as nonsense.

In Danehouse ward there was a tighter system for obtaining proxy votes than in the 1999 election but overall the number of absent votes were only 100 less than in 1999, while split fairly evenly between Labour and the Liberal Democrats. On election day itself Labour called for the resignation of a Liberal Democrat councillor in Danehouse ward, Arif Khan, after claiming his parents were registered for proxy votes despite living in Pakistan; however Khan denied doing anything wrong.

== Election results ==
The results saw Labour lose their majority on the council for the first time since the early 1970s.

Burnley local election result 2000
Party	Seats	Gains	Losses	Net gain/loss	Seats %	Votes %	Votes	+/−
Labour	7			-7	41.2			
Independent	7			+6	41.2			
Liberal Democrats	2			+1	11.8			
Conservative	1			0	5.9			
