= 2000 Milton Keynes Council election =

2000 UK local government election

The 2000 Milton Keynes Council election took place on 4 May 2000 to elect members of Milton Keynes Council (a unitary authority) in Buckinghamshire, England. One third of the council was up for election and the council stayed under no overall control.

After the election, the composition of the council was:

- Labour 22
- Liberal Democrat 20
- Conservative 8
- Independent 1

== Campaign ==
The Labour Prime Minister Tony Blair came to Milton Keynes to launch his party's local election campaign. Labour were defending control of Milton Keynes council, but before the election were relying on the casting vote of the mayor to keep control, after 2 Labour councillors left the party to become independents.

The election in Milton Keynes saw a relaxation of the rules for requesting a postal vote, allowing anyone who wanted to vote by post. As a result the number of postal vote requests increased from the normal 1,100 to 3,600.

== Election result ==
The results saw no party win a majority on the council, with Labour losing seats, including 3 to the Conservatives.

Milton Keynes local election result 2000
Party	Seats	Gains	Losses	Net gain/loss	Seats %	Votes %	Votes	+/−
Liberal Democrats	9	1	0	+1	50.0	34.5	11,994	+5.6
Conservative	5	4	0	+4	27.8	30.7	10,670	+1.3
Labour	4	1	4	-3	22.2	31.6	10,977	-5.2
Independent	0	0	2	-2	0.0	1.9	648	-1.5
Green	0	0	0	0	0.0	1.4	489	+0.2

== Ward results ==
Bradwell
Party	Candidate	Votes	%	±%
Liberal Democrats	Phillip Gerrella	1,281	53.8	
Labour	Graeme Lindsay	776	32.6	
Conservative	Dean Miah	324	13.6	
Majority		505	21.2	
Turnout		2,381		
Liberal Democrats gain from Labour		Swing		

Bradwell Abbey
Party	Candidate	Votes	%	±%
Conservative	Donald Hoyle	503	43.4	
Labour	David Lewis	497	42.9	
Liberal Democrats	Christopher Williams	159	13.7	
Majority		6	0.5	
Turnout		1,159		
Conservative gain from Labour		Swing		

Campbell Park
Party	Candidate	Votes	%	±%
Liberal Democrats	Roger Tallack	1,154	54.7	−6.8
Labour	Martin Petchey	498	23.6	−3.1
Conservative	Malcolm Fryer-Kelsey	386	18.3	+9.5
Green	Clive Bailey	72	3.4	+3.4
Majority		656	31.1	−3.7
Turnout		2,110		
Liberal Democrats hold		Swing		

Denbigh
Party	Candidate	Votes	%	±%
Conservative	Roger Jacobs	1,021	38.5	+5.7
Labour	Gladstone McKenzie	952	35.9	−16.1
Independent	William Harnett	435	16.4	+16.4
Liberal Democrats	Edis Bevan	243	9.2	−6.0
Majority		69	2.6	
Turnout		2,651		
Conservative gain from Independent		Swing		

Eaton Manor
Party	Candidate	Votes	%	±%
Labour	Reginald Edwards	809	62.6	
Conservative	Dennis Thatcher	326	25.2	
Liberal Democrats	Vanessa McPake	158	12.2	
Majority		483	37.4	
Turnout		1,293		
Labour hold		Swing		

Linford North
Party	Candidate	Votes	%	±%
Liberal Democrats	Robert Benning	929	47.0	+1.5
Conservative	David Tunney	633	32.1	+3.7
Labour	John Mclinton	326	16.5	−6.2
Green	Peter Edwards	87	4.4	+1.0
Majority		296	15.0	−2.1
Turnout		1,975		
Liberal Democrats hold		Swing		

Linford South
Party	Candidate	Votes	%	±%
Liberal Democrats	John Monk	1,117	54.8	+11.1
Labour	Claudine Elliott	625	30.7	−6.3
Conservative	Peter Davies	297	14.6	−0.6
Majority		492	24.1	+17.4
Turnout		2,039		
Liberal Democrats hold		Swing		

Loughton Park
Party	Candidate	Votes	%	±%
Conservative	Andrew Dransfield	1,382	50.5	+6.7
Labour	George Conchie	1,016	37.2	−7.8
Liberal Democrats	Isabella Fraser	336	12.3	+1.1
Majority		366	13.3	
Turnout		2,734		
Conservative gain from Labour		Swing		

Newport Pagnell North
Party	Candidate	Votes	%	±%
Liberal Democrats	Euan Henderson	1,079	67.1	
Conservative	Michael Horton	331	20.6	
Labour	Brian Todd	197	12.3	
Majority		748	46.5	
Turnout		1,607		
Liberal Democrats hold		Swing		

Newport Pagnell South
Party	Candidate	Votes	%	±%
Liberal Democrats	Irene Henderson	1,239	68.5	
Conservative	Amanda Box	336	18.6	
Labour	Dawn Hoyle	234	12.9	
Majority		903	49.9	
Turnout		1,809		
Liberal Democrats hold		Swing		

Olney
Party	Candidate	Votes	%	±%
Liberal Democrats	Graham Mabbutt	974	54.4	
Conservative	Ann Johnston	449	25.1	
Independent	Joan Jones	213	11.9	
Labour	Peter Hevey	156	8.7	
Majority		525	29.3	
Turnout		1,792		
Liberal Democrats hold		Swing		

Stantonbury
Party	Candidate	Votes	%	±%
Conservative	Roy Miller	688	42.1	+12.2
Labour	Henry Kilkenny	598	36.6	−16.5
Liberal Democrats	Robert Exon	283	17.3	+3.8
Green	Carol Barac	66	4.0	+0.5
Majority		90	5.5	
Turnout		1,635		
Conservative gain from Labour		Swing		

Stony Stratford
Party	Candidate	Votes	%	±%
Conservative	Paul Bartlett	1,331	51.4	+5.1
Labour	Mary Stone	1,061	41.0	−5.8
Liberal Democrats	Derek Eastman	195	7.5	+0.5
Majority		270	10.4	
Turnout		2,587		
Conservative hold		Swing		

Walton Park (2)
Party	Candidate	Votes	%	±%
Liberal Democrats	Elizabeth Pym	1,145		
Liberal Democrats	Clive Carruthers	1,073		
Conservative	Neil Cawley	490		
Conservative	Louise Cooper	458		
Labour	Sarah Gilmour-Sorensen	291		
Labour	Michael Duff	240		
Turnout		3,697		
Liberal Democrats hold		Swing		
Liberal Democrats hold		Swing		

Whaddon
Party	Candidate	Votes	%	±%
Labour	Elizabeth Campbell	755	47.0	
Conservative	Derrick Connor	683	42.5	
Liberal Democrats	Rosemary Drewett	168	10.5	
Majority		72	4.5	
Turnout		1,606		
Labour gain from Independent		Swing		

Wolverton
Party	Candidate	Votes	%	±%
Labour	Hilary Saunders	981	53.6	−6.3
Conservative	Ashraful Hoque	469	25.6	+6.1
Liberal Democrats	Martin Snell	197	10.8	+0.2
Green	Alan Francis	184	10.0	+0.1
Majority		512	28.0	−12.4
Turnout		1,831		
Labour hold		Swing		

Woughton
Party	Candidate	Votes	%	±%
Labour	Kevin Wilson	965	51.5	−11.5
Conservative	William Kenyon	563	30.1	+7.5
Liberal Democrats	James Forsyth	264	14.1	−0.3
Green	Claire Butler	80	4.3	+4.3
Majority		402	21.5	−18.9
Turnout		1,872		
Labour hold		Swing		
