= 2000 Stratford-on-Avon District Council election =

2000 UK local government election

The 2000 Stratford-on-Avon District Council election took place on 4 May 2000 to elect members of Stratford-on-Avon District Council in Warwickshire, England. One third of the council was up for election and the Conservative Party gained overall control of the council from no overall control.

After the election, the composition of the council was

- Conservative 28
- Liberal Democrat 18
- Independent 7
- Labour 2

== Campaign ==
18 of the 55 seats on the council were contested in the election with the Conservatives defending 9, Liberal Democrats 5, Labour 2 and independents 2. The Conservatives contested all 18 seats and needed to make 4 gains to take overall control of the council.

The election in Stratford-on-Avon saw a trial of electronic voting in an attempt to increase turnout. However, there were some computer problems and delays in closing polling stations, which meant that results were delayed by an hour.

== Election result ==
The results saw the Conservatives achieve a majority on the council, 5 years after they lost the majority. They gained the 4 seats they had required, after winning 2 seats from the Liberal Democrats in Bidford and Stratford New Town wards, and 2 from Labour in Southam and Studley. As a result, the Conservative leader on the council, Bob Stevens, took over the leadership of the council from Liberal Democrat, Susan Juned.

Stratford-on-Avon local election result 2000
Party	Seats	Gains	Losses	Net gain/loss	Seats %	Votes %	Votes	+/−
Conservative	13	4	0	+4	72.2	54.5	12,379	
Liberal Democrats	3	0	2	-2	16.7	28.5	6,469	
Independent	2	0	0	0	11.1	10.4	2,361	
Labour	0	0	2	-2	0	6.0	1,362	
Green	0	0	0	0	0	0.6	126	

== Ward results ==
Alcester
Party	Candidate	Votes	%	±%
Liberal Democrats	Clifford Meade	1,001	53.5	
Conservative	Susan Adams	870	46.5	
Majority		131	7.0	
Turnout		1,871		
Liberal Democrats hold		Swing		

Bidford
Party	Candidate	Votes	%	±%
Conservative	David Saville	560	51.1	
Independent	Graham Getgood	409	37.3	
Labour	Michael Gerrard	127	11.6	
Majority		151	13.8	
Turnout		1,096		
Conservative gain from Liberal Democrats		Swing		

Compton
Party	Candidate	Votes	%	±%
Conservative	Nigel Foster	446	66.3	
Liberal Democrats	Virginia Mason	227	33.7	
Majority		219	32.6	
Turnout		673		
Conservative hold		Swing		

Harbury
Party	Candidate	Votes	%	±%
Conservative	James Turner	882	56.1	
Liberal Democrats	David Booth	691	43.9	
Majority		191	12.2	
Turnout		1,573		
Conservative hold		Swing		

Henley
Party	Candidate	Votes	%	±%
Conservative	George Atkinson	822	64.6	
Liberal Democrats	Anthony Wright	450	35.4	
Majority		372	29.2	
Turnout		1,272		
Conservative hold		Swing		

Moreton Morrell
Party	Candidate	Votes	%	±%
Liberal Democrats	John Davis	342	62.1	
Conservative	Edward Duckworth	209	37.9	
Majority		133	24.2	
Turnout		551		
Liberal Democrats hold		Swing		

Napton Priors
Party	Candidate	Votes	%	±%
Conservative	Malcolm Thomas	510	82.9	
Labour	Peter Hartland	105	17.1	
Majority		405	65.8	
Turnout		615		
Conservative hold		Swing		

Salford Priors
Party	Candidate	Votes	%	±%
Independent	Kim James	336	69.7	
Conservative	David Harrison	146	30.3	
Majority		190	39.4	
Turnout		482		
Independent hold		Swing		

Shipston
Party	Candidate	Votes	%	±%
Conservative	Trevor Russel	702	47.1	
Liberal Democrats	Robert White	686	46.0	
Labour	Ann Grosvenor	102	6.8	
Majority		16	1.1	
Turnout		1,490		
Conservative hold		Swing		

Southam
Party	Candidate	Votes	%	±%
Conservative	Alan Akeister	1,131	59.8	
Labour	Martyn Ashford	760	40.2	
Majority		371	19.6	
Turnout		1,891		
Conservative gain from Labour		Swing		

Stratford Alverston
Party	Candidate	Votes	%	±%
Conservative	Richard Hyde	1,280	69.2	
Independent	Vincent Seaman	570	30.8	
Majority		710	38.4	
Turnout		1,850		
Conservative hold		Swing		

Stratford Guild
Party	Candidate	Votes	%	±%
Conservative	Giovanni Renna	858	57.7	
Liberal Democrats	David Roberts	629	42.3	
Majority		229	15.4	
Turnout		1,487		
Conservative hold		Swing		

Stratford Market Hall
Party	Candidate	Votes	%	±%
Liberal Democrats	Peter Moorse	928	52.5	
Conservative	Richard Kingston	668	37.8	
Labour	Matthew Stephens	173	9.8	
Majority		260	14.7	
Turnout		1,769		
Liberal Democrats hold		Swing		

Stratford New Town
Party	Candidate	Votes	%	±%
Conservative	Juliet Short	659	50.1	
Liberal Democrats	Dinah Hanlon	562	42.7	
Labour	Karen Parnell	95	7.2	
Majority		97	7.4	
Turnout		1,316		
Conservative gain from Liberal Democrats		Swing		

Studley
Party	Candidate	Votes	%	±%
Conservative	Desmond Maries	968	71.5	
Liberal Democrats	Mary Smith	385	28.5	
Majority		583	43.0	
Turnout		1,353		
Conservative gain from Labour		Swing		

Tredington
Party	Candidate	Votes	%	±%
Conservative	Christopher Saint	642	62.3	
Liberal Democrats	Stephen Wright	388	37.7	
Majority		254	24.6	
Turnout		1,030		
Conservative hold		Swing		

Wellesbourne
Party	Candidate	Votes	%	±%
Independent	Roger Wright	1,046	60.2	
Conservative	Malcolm Littlewood	565	32.5	
Green	Michael Davies	126	7.3	
Majority		491	27.7	
Turnout		1,737		
Independent hold		Swing		

Wooton Wawen
Party	Candidate	Votes	%	±%
Conservative	Ann Haddon	461	71.9	
Liberal Democrats	Lynn Bowring	180	28.1	
Majority		281	43.8	
Turnout		641		
Conservative hold		Swing		
