= 2000 Nuneaton and Bedworth Borough Council election =

2000 UK local government election

The 2000 Nuneaton and Bedworth Borough Council election to the Nuneaton and Bedworth Borough Council was held in May 2000. The Labour Party retained control of the council.

After the election, the composition of the council was:

- Labour 35
- Conservatives 10

== Election result ==
Nuneaton and Bedworth Council Election 2000
Party	Seats	Gains	Losses	Net gain/loss	Seats %	Votes %	Votes	+/−
Labour	35	0	5	-5				
Conservative	10	5	0	+5				
Liberal Democrats	0	0	0	0				
Liberal	0	0	0	0				
Independent	0	0	0	0				
