= 2000 Rugby Borough Council election =

2000 UK local government election

Elections to Rugby Borough Council were held on 4 May 2000. One third of the council seats were up for election. The council stayed under no overall control. The number of councillors for each party after the election were Labour eighteen, Conservative fourteen, Liberal Democrat nine and Independent seven.

== Election result ==
Rugby local election result 2000
Party	Seats	Gains	Losses	Net gain/loss	Seats %	Votes %	Votes	+/−
Conservative	7			+2	43.8			
Labour	4			-3	25.0			
Liberal Democrats	3			+2	18.8			
Independent	2			-1	12.5			
