= 2000 Bury Metropolitan Borough Council election =

2000 UK local government election

Elections to Bury Council were held on 4 May 2000. One third of the council was up for election and the Labour Party kept overall control of the council. Overall turnout was 27.38%.

After the election, the composition of the council was:

- Labour 32
- Conservative 13
- Liberal Democrat 3

== Election result ==
Bury local election result 2000
Party	Seats	Gains	Losses	Net gain/loss	Seats %	Votes %	Votes	+/−
Labour	9	0	5	-5	52.9	42.3	17,324	-6.4%
Conservative	7	5	0	+5	41.2	41.5	16,962	+8.7%
Liberal Democrats	1	0	0	0	5.9	15.1	6,196	+1.2%
Environment and Wildlife	0	0	0	0	0	0.8	321	-3.1%
Independent	0	0	0	0	0	0.3	107	-0.4%

== Ward results ==
Besses
Party	Candidate	Votes	%	±%
Labour	Alan Matthews	783	55.0	−12.4
Conservative	Mark Roberts	472	33.1	+11.0
Liberal Democrats	Ivy Hooley	169	11.9	+1.3
Majority		311	21.9	−23.4
Turnout		1,424	20.8	−0.7
Labour hold		Swing		

Church
Party	Candidate	Votes	%	±%
Conservative	Roy Walker	1,937	63.3	+15.8
Labour	Jonathan Ashworth	776	25.4	−14.2
Environment and Wildlife	Michael Wellock	179	5.9	−7.1
Liberal Democrats	Fiona Davison	169	5.5	+5.5
Majority		1,158	37.9	+30.0
Turnout		3,058	34.6	−1.3
Conservative hold		Swing		

East
Party	Candidate	Votes	%	±%
Labour	John Byrne	974	62.3	−10.6
Conservative	Roger Thompson	401	25.6	+7.2
Independent	Victor Hagan	107	6.8	+6.8
Liberal Democrats	Theodor Tymczyna	82	5.2	−3.6
Majority		573	36.7	−17.8
Turnout		1,564	20.7	−0.8
Labour hold		Swing		

Elton
Party	Candidate	Votes	%	±%
Conservative	Yvonne Creswell	1,127	45.2	+10.2
Labour	Andrea Hughes	1,041	41.8	−5.4
Liberal Democrats	Robert Sloss	181	7.3	−1.3
Environment and Wildlife	Glyn Heath	142	5.7	−3.5
Majority		86	3.4	
Turnout		2,491	27.4	+0.2
Conservative gain from Labour		Swing		

Holyrood
Party	Candidate	Votes	%	±%
Liberal Democrats	Wilfred Davison	1,370	56.4	−2.3
Labour	Mary Whitby	593	24.4	−3.3
Conservative	Jeanette Chrystal	467	19.2	+5.6
Majority		777	32.0	+1.0
Turnout		2,430	29.8	−0.6
Liberal Democrats hold		Swing		

Moorside
Party	Candidate	Votes	%	±%
Conservative	James Taylor	1,384	53.4	+15.4
Labour	Mohammad Rashid	940	36.3	−13.8
Liberal Democrats	Winifred Rohmann	269	10.4	+4.9
Majority		444	17.1	
Turnout		2,593	31.8	+2.3
Conservative gain from Labour		Swing		

Pilkington Park
Party	Candidate	Votes	%	±%
Conservative	Bernard Vincent	921	44.9	+3.0
Labour	Alan Bridson	915	44.6	−5.2
Liberal Democrats	Michael Bell	217	10.6	+2.3
Majority		6	0.3	
Turnout		2,053	26.3	+1.0
Conservative gain from Labour		Swing		

Radcliffe Central
Party	Candidate	Votes	%	±%
Labour	Wayne Campbell	1,440	64.3	+2.8
Conservative	Cherill Dunkley	411	18.3	+6.0
Liberal Democrats	Michael Halsall	389	17.4	−8.9
Majority		1,029	46.0	+20.8
Turnout		2,240	25.8	−4.0
Labour hold		Swing		

Radcliffe North (2)
Party	Candidate	Votes	%	±%
Labour	Timothy Chamberlain	1,375		
Conservative	Denise Bigg	1,345		
Conservative	Alan Bigg	1,284		
Labour	Susan Worsley	1,220		
Liberal Democrats	Mary D'Albert	265		
Liberal Democrats	Alan Hooley	259		
Turnout		5,748	27.7	−0.8
Labour hold		Swing		
Conservative gain from Labour		Swing		

Radcliffe South
Party	Candidate	Votes	%	±%
Labour	Siobhan Costello	833	45.3	−8.9
Conservative	Peter Wright	827	45.0	+9.4
Liberal Democrats	Bryn Hackley	177	9.6	−0.6
Majority		6	0.3	−18.3
Turnout		1,837	23.0	−0.5
Labour hold		Swing		

Ramsbottom
Party	Candidate	Votes	%	±%
Conservative	Sheila Magnall	1,847	53.0	+9.2
Labour	Mark Riddell	1,286	36.9	−6.0
Liberal Democrats	David Foss	352	10.1	+3.8
Majority		561	16.1	+15.2
Turnout		3,485	31.6	−1.2
Conservative gain from Labour		Swing		

Redvales
Party	Candidate	Votes	%	±%
Labour	Constance FitzGerald	1,163	60.5	−6.4
Conservative	Christopher Hall	517	26.9	+7.0
Liberal Democrats	Martin Robinson-Dowland	243	12.6	+12.6
Majority		646	33.6	−13.4
Turnout		1,923	23.9	−2.8
Labour hold		Swing		

St Mary's
Party	Candidate	Votes	%	±%
Labour	Steven Treadgold	982	43.9	−8.2
Conservative	Eric Margieson	754	33.7	+6.9
Liberal Democrats	Gillian Duffey	501	22.4	+1.3
Majority		228	10.2	−15.1
Turnout		2,237	24.8	−2.2
Labour hold		Swing		

Sedgley
Party	Candidate	Votes	%	±%
Labour	Paul Nesbit	1,118	43.1	−2.0
Liberal Democrats	Timothy Pickstone	1,021	39.4	+0.7
Conservative	Marilyn Vincent	455	17.5	+1.3
Majority		97	3.7	−2.7
Turnout		2,594	32.0	+1.5
Labour hold		Swing		

Tottington
Party	Candidate	Votes	%	±%
Conservative	Yvonne Wright	1,779	60.4	+0.6
Labour	Victor McClung	840	28.5	−1.9
Liberal Democrats	Janet Turner	326	11.1	+1.3
Majority		939	31.9	+2.5
Turnout		2,945	29.6	−0.5
Conservative hold		Swing		

Unsworth
Party	Candidate	Votes	%	±%
Labour	Stella Smith	1,045	45.7	−4.4
Conservative	Samuel Cohen	1,034	45.3	+11.6
Liberal Democrats	Geoffrey Young	206	9.0	+2.6
Majority		11	0.4	−16.0
Turnout		2,285	28.4	−1.3
Labour hold		Swing		
