= 2000 Waveney District Council election =

Election in Suffolk, England

The 2000 Waveney Council election took place on 4 May 2000 to elect members of Waveney District Council in Suffolk, England. One third of the council was up for election and the Labour Party stayed in overall control of the council.

After the election, the composition of the council was:

- Labour 28
- Conservative 13
- Liberal Democrat 4
- Independent 2
- Others 1

== Election results ==
2000 Waveney District Council election
Party	This election			Full council			This election		
Party	Seats	Net	Seats %	Other	Total	Total %	Votes	Votes %	+/−
Labour	4	▼9	25.0	24	28	58.3	8,838	37.4	-13.3
Conservative	9	▲8	56.3	5	13	27.1	9,360	39.6	+7.5
Liberal Democrats	2	▲1	12.5	2	4	8.3	4,302	18.2	+6.4
Independent	1	Steady	6.3	2	3	6.3	1,130	4.8	+2.0

== Ward results ==
Beccles Town
Party	Candidate	Votes	%	±%
Liberal Democrats	Eileen Crisp	899	43.9	+32.5
Conservative	Keith Standring	642	31.3	+11.2
Labour	Peter Shelley	509	24.8	−12.8
Majority		257	12.6	
Turnout		2,050		

Beccles Worlingham
Party	Candidate	Votes	%	±%
Conservative	Shirley Cole	735	51.6	+15.4
Labour	William Mason	503	35.3	−14.8
Liberal Democrats	Nicholas Bromley	186	13.1	−0.6
Majority		232	16.3	
Turnout		1,424		

Bungay
Party	Candidate	Votes	%	±%
Conservative	John Groom	705	46.5	+12.5
Labour	David Jermy	696	45.9	−8.4
Liberal Democrats	Darren Ware	115	7.6	−4.1
Majority		9	0.6	
Turnout		1,516		

Carlton
Party	Candidate	Votes	%	±%
Conservative	Bernard Reader	882	50.5	+19.6
Labour	Jacqueline Wagner	649	37.1	−13.2
Liberal Democrats	Andrew Thomas	216	12.4	+3.9
Majority		233	13.4	
Turnout		1,747		

Carlton Colville
Party	Candidate	Votes	%	±%
Conservative	Ronald Bell	403	33.9	
Independent	James Mitchell	361	30.4	
Labour	Norman Hodges	301	25.3	
Independent	Norman Keable	62	5.2	
Liberal Democrats	Arnold Martin	61	5.1	
Majority		42	3.5	
Turnout		1,188		

Gunton
Party	Candidate	Votes	%	±%
Conservative	Stephen Chilvers	878	53.1	+10.0
Labour	Gordon Stewart	597	36.1	−9.7
Liberal Democrats	Antony Tibbitt	178	10.8	−0.3
Majority		281	17.0	
Turnout		1,653		

Halesworth
Party	Candidate	Votes	%	±%
Conservative	Robert Niblett	570	47.0	+15.0
Labour	Paul Whitlow	456	37.6	−30.4
Liberal Democrats	Susan Bainer	186	15.3	+15.3
Majority		114	9.4	
Turnout		1,212		

Harbour
Party	Candidate	Votes	%	±%
Independent	Ruth Ford	707	56.3	+17.7
Labour	Stella Bostock	344	27.4	−12.5
Conservative	Stephen Ames	116	9.2	+0.5
Liberal Democrats	Paul Meadez	89	7.1	−5.7
Majority		363	28.9	
Turnout		1,256		

Kessingland
Party	Candidate	Votes	%	±%
Conservative	Kenneth Sale	462	46.2	
Labour	Kate McGee	416	41.6	
Liberal Democrats	Alison Briggs	122	12.2	
Majority		46	4.6	
Turnout		1,000		

Kirkley
Party	Candidate	Votes	%	±%
Liberal Democrats	Gifford Baxter	652	48.5	−3.0
Labour	Ernest Skepelhorn	501	37.3	−0.5
Conservative	Shona Reeves	190	14.1	+3.4
Majority		151	11.2	−2.5
Turnout		1,343		

Normanston
Party	Candidate	Votes	%	±%
Labour	Kevin Porter	586	60.5	−12.6
Conservative	May Reader	260	26.8	+10.9
Liberal Democrats	Breena Batchelder	123	12.7	+1.7
Majority		326	33.6	−23.6
Turnout		969		

Oulton
Party	Candidate	Votes	%	±%
Conservative	Michael Partridge	1,127	56.1	+11.1
Labour	Malcolm Cherry	685	34.1	−11.6
Liberal Democrats	Philip Mummery	198	9.9	+0.7
Majority		442	22.0	
Turnout		2,010		

Pakefield
Party	Candidate	Votes	%	±%
Labour	Ronald Thorne	816	52.0	−7.9
Conservative	Valerie Pulford	556	35.5	+4.8
Liberal Democrats	Brian Howe	196	12.5	+3.2
Majority		260	16.6	−12.6
Turnout		1,568		

Saint Margarets
Party	Candidate	Votes	%	±%
Labour	Jonathan Winterton	820	55.9	−12.5
Conservative	Anne Mylan	483	32.9	+12.1
Liberal Democrats	Leslie Batchelder	164	11.2	+0.4
Majority		337	23.0	−24.7
Turnout		1,467		

Southwold
Party	Candidate	Votes	%	±%
Conservative	John Goldsmith	1,085	50.3	−10.0
Liberal Democrats	Michael Ladd	787	36.5	+36.5
Labour	Kenneth Francis	284	13.2	−26.5
Majority		298	13.8	−6.8
Turnout		2,156		

Whitton
Party	Candidate	Votes	%	±%
Labour	Rita Carter	675	63.0	−9.6
Conservative	Barry Bee	266	24.8	+8.5
Liberal Democrats	Sandra Tonge	130	12.1	+1.0
Majority		409	38.2	−18.1
Turnout		1,071		
