= 2000 Great Yarmouth Borough Council election =

2000 UK local government election

The 2000 Great Yarmouth Borough Council election took place on 4 May 2000 to elect members of Great Yarmouth Borough Council in Norfolk, England. One third of the council was up for election and the Conservative Party gained overall control of the council from the Labour Party.

After the election, the composition of the council was:

- Conservative 26
- Labour 22

== Election result ==
Great Yarmouth local election result 2000
Party	Seats	Gains	Losses	Net gain/loss	Seats %	Votes %	Votes	+/−
Conservative	12			+7	75.0			
Labour	4			-7	25.0			
