= 2000 Broxbourne Borough Council election =

2000 UK local government election

The Broxbourne Council election, 2000 was held to elect council members of the Broxbourne Borough Council, the local government authority of the borough of Broxbourne, Hertfordshire, England.

== Composition of expiring seats before election ==
Ward	Party	Incumbent Elected	Incumbent	Standing again?
Broxbourne	Conservative	1999	Donald Poole	Yes
Bury Green	Conservative	1999	Dorothy Edmonds	Yes
Cheshunt Central	Conservative	1999	Milan Milovanovic	Yes
Cheshunt North	Conservative	1999	Mark Farrington	Yes
Flamstead End	Conservative	1999	David Manning	Yes
Goffs Oak	Conservative	1999	Jacqueline De Pace	Yes
Hoddesdon North	Conservative	1999	Lyn White	Yes
Hoddesdon Town	Conservative	1999	John Rose	Yes
Rye Park	Conservative	1999	Peter Swannell	Yes
Theobalds	Conservative	1999	Charles Tranham	Yes
Waltham Cross	Labour	1999	Marios Kousoulou	Yes
Wormley / Turnford	Conservative	1999	Paul Mason	Yes

== Election results ==
Broxbourne local election result 2000
Party	Seats	Gains	Losses	Net gain/loss	Seats %	Votes %	Votes	+/−
Conservative	12	1	0	+1	100.00	65.87	9,131	
Labour	0	0	1	-1	0.00	24.78	3,435	
Liberal Democrats	0	0	0	0	0.00	7.85	1,088	
BNP	0	0	0	0	0.00	1.50	208	

== Results summary ==
An election was held in 12 wards on 4 May 2000.

There was no election in Rosedale Ward.

The Conservative Party won all 12 seats making 1 gain at the expense of the Labour Party in Waltham Cross Ward.

Mark Farrington won Cheshunt North Ward for the Conservative Party having "crossed the floor" of the council chamber since the 1999 local government election when he had won a Cheshunt North seat for the Labour Party.

This was the first local election since 1995 where the British National Party had fielded any candidates.

The new political balance of the council following this election was:

- Conservative 35 seats
- Labour 3 seats

== Ward results ==
Broxbourne Ward Result 4 May 2000
Party	Candidate	Votes	%	±%
Conservative	Donald Poole	900	74.56	
Labour	Janet Kousoulou	307	25.44	
Majority		593		
Turnout		1,207	23.27%	
Conservative hold		Swing		

Bury Green Ward Result 4 May 2000
Party	Candidate	Votes	%	±%
Conservative	Dorothy Edmonds	783	68.74	
Labour	Rachel Bates	356	31.26	
Majority		427		
Turnout		1,139	23.75	
Conservative hold		Swing		

Cheshunt Central Ward Result 4 May 2000
Party	Candidate	Votes	%	±%
Conservative	Milan Milovanovic	825	59.87	
Labour	Edwin Bates	314	22.79	
Liberal Democrats	Robert Smith	142	10.30	
BNP	John Cope	97	7.04	
Majority		511		
Turnout		1,378	24.46	
Conservative hold		Swing		

Cheshunt North Ward Result 4 May 2000
Party	Candidate	Votes	%	±%
Conservative	Mark Farrington	683	52.99	
Labour	Richard Clark	381	29.56	
Liberal Democrats	Nicholas Garton	114	8.84	
BNP	Ramon Johns	111	8.61	
Majority		302		
Turnout		1,289	23.92	
Conservative hold		Swing		

Flamstead End Ward Result 4 May 2000
Party	Candidate	Votes	%	±%
Conservative	David Manning	756	70.86	
Labour	Derrick Shiers	200	18.74	
Liberal Democrats	Maureen Smith	111	10.40	
Majority		556		
Turnout		1,067	22.15	
Conservative hold		Swing		

Goffs Oak Ward Result 4 May 2000
Party	Candidate	Votes	%	±%
Conservative	Jacqueline De Pace	974	84.33	
Labour	Christopher Simonovitch	181	15.67	
Majority		793		
Turnout		1,155	23.94	
Conservative hold		Swing		

Hoddesdon North Ward Result 4 May 2000
Party	Candidate	Votes	%	±%
Conservative	Evelyn White	860	71.85	
Labour	Glenn Craig	171	14.29	
Liberal Democrats	Eric Waughray	166	13.86	
Majority		689		
Turnout		1,197	23.27	
Conservative hold		Swing		

Hoddesdon Town Ward Result 4 May 2000
Party	Candidate	Votes	%	±%
Conservative	John Rose	628	60.33	
Labour	Malcolm Aitken	280	26.90	
Liberal Democrats	Peter Huse	133	12.77	
Majority		348		
Turnout		1,041	21.00	
Conservative hold		Swing		

Rye Park Ward Result 4 May 2000
Party	Candidate	Votes	%	±%
Conservative	Peter Swannell	627	58.93	
Liberal Democrats	Michael Winrow	325	30.55	
Labour	Carolyn Iles	112	10.52	
Majority		302		
Turnout		1,064		
Conservative hold		Swing		

Theobalds Ward Result 4 May 2000
Party	Candidate	Votes	%	±%
Conservative	Charles Tranham	934	69.24	
Labour	Ronald McCole	415	30.76	
Majority		519		
Turnout		1,489	26.93	
Conservative hold		Swing		

Waltham Cross Ward Result 4 May 2000
Party	Candidate	Votes	%	±%
Conservative	Graham Manley	498	51.50	
Labour	Marios Kousoulou	469	48.50	
Majority		29		
Turnout		967	20.76	
Conservative gain from Labour		Swing		

Wormley / Turnford Ward Result 4 May 2000
Party	Candidate	Votes	%	±%
Conservative	Paul Mason	663	65.71	
Labour	Malcolm Theobald	249	24.68	
Liberal Democrats	Penelope Simmons	97	9.61	
Majority		414		
Turnout		1,009	16.78	
Conservative hold		Swing		
