= 2000 West Lindsey District Council election =

2000 UK local government election

Elections to West Lindsey District Council were held on 4 May 2000. One third of the council was up for election and the council stayed under no overall control.

After the election, the composition of the council was

- Liberal Democrat 16
- Conservative 9
- Independent 9
- Labour 3

== Election result ==
West Lindsey Local Election Result 2000
Party	Seats	Gains	Losses	Net gain/loss	Seats %	Votes %	Votes	+/−
Liberal Democrats	7	1	1	0	53.8	51.0	6,101	+4.9%
Conservative	2	1	2	-1	23.1	36.7	4,385	+8.2%
Independent	3	1	0	+1	23.1	7.5	893	-4.1%
Labour	0	0	0	0	0	4.9	584	-8.9%

1 Independent candidate was unopposed.

== Ward results ==
Caistor
Party	Candidate	Votes	%	±%
Independent	Roy Schofield	366	47.2	
Conservative	Derrick Mortimer	305	39.3	
Labour	Robin Barr	82	10.6	
Liberal Democrats	Andrew Heathorn	23	3.0	
Majority		61	7.9	
Turnout		776	31.0	
Independent gain from Conservative		Swing		

Cherry Willingham
Party	Candidate	Votes	%	±%
Independent	George Greenaway	527	56.9	
Liberal Democrats	Stuart Miller	400	43.1	
Majority		127	13.8	
Turnout		927	30.2	−7.5
Independent hold		Swing		

Dunholme
Party	Candidate	Votes	%	±%
Conservative	Susan Rawlins	390	65.5	+16.8
Liberal Democrats	Peter Turner	205	34.5	−16.8
Majority		185	31.0	
Turnout		595	36.2	−3.9
Conservative gain from Liberal Democrats		Swing		

Gainsborough East
Party	Candidate	Votes	%	±%
Liberal Democrats	Michael Tinker	551	76.2	
Conservative	William Morgan	172	23.8	
Majority		379	52.4	
Turnout		723	16.8	−5.4
Liberal Democrats hold		Swing		

Gainsborough North
Party	Candidate	Votes	%	±%
Liberal Democrats	Thomas Brown	552	63.3	
Conservative	Sally Jupp	320	36.7	
Majority		232	26.6	
Turnout		872	17.5	−4.5
Liberal Democrats hold		Swing		

Gainsborough South-West
Party	Candidate	Votes	%	±%
Liberal Democrats	Trevor Young	407	52.7	
Labour	Brenda Mills	188	24.4	
Conservative	Stephen Beer	177	22.9	
Majority		219	28.3	
Turnout		772	23.2	−3.6
Liberal Democrats hold		Swing		

Market Rasen
Party	Candidate	Votes	%	±%
Liberal Democrats	Gary Fenwick	740	60.6	
Conservative	Alfred Jones	419	34.3	
Labour	Philip Huckin	62	5.1	
Majority		321	26.3	
Turnout		1,221	33.4	−0.4
Liberal Democrats hold		Swing		

Nettleham
Party	Candidate	Votes	%	±%
Liberal Democrats	Raymond Sellars	977	64.9	
Conservative	Margaret Davidson	528	35.1	
Majority		449	29.8	
Turnout		1,505	42.4	−0.8
Liberal Democrats hold		Swing		

Saxilby
Party	Candidate	Votes	%	±%
Liberal Democrats	David Cotton	667	54.3	
Conservative	Delyse Silverstone	417	33.9	
Labour	Howard Gillson	145	11.8	
Majority		250	20.4	
Turnout		1,229	39.1	+7.2
Liberal Democrats gain from Conservative		Swing		

Scotter
Party	Candidate	Votes	%	±%
Conservative	William Parry	742	68.6	
Liberal Democrats	Martin Walker	340	31.4	
Majority		402	37.2	
Turnout		1,082	32.3	−2.0
Conservative hold		Swing		

Stow
Party	Candidate	Votes	%	±%
Liberal Democrats	Reginald Shore	562	71.0	
Conservative	Martin Macpherson-Lawley	229	29.0	
Majority		333	42.0	
Turnout		791	47.3	+4.4
Liberal Democrats hold		Swing		

Sudbrooke
Party	Candidate	Votes	%	±%
Independent	Stuart Curtis	uncontested		
Independent hold		Swing		

Welton
Party	Candidate	Votes	%	±%
Conservative	Charles Ireland	686	46.7	
Liberal Democrats	Roger Hiscox	677	46.1	
Labour	Sally Scott	107	7.3	
Majority		9	0.6	
Turnout		1,470	40.7	+2.5
Conservative hold		Swing		
