= 2000 Salford City Council election =

2000 UK local government election

Elections to Salford Borough Council were held on 4 May 2000. One third of the council was up for election. The Labour Party kept overall control of the council. Overall turnout was 21.04%.

After the election, the composition of the council was:

- Labour 52
- Liberal Democrat 5
- Conservative 3

== Election results ==
Salford local election result 2000
Party	Seats	Gains	Losses	Net gain/loss	Seats %	Votes %	Votes	+/−
Labour	16	0	4	-4	76.2	43.9	15,646	-15.2
Conservative	3	3	0	+3	14.3	27.7	9,855	+9.0
Liberal Democrats	2	2	1	+1	9.5	24.5	8,712	+2.4
Liberal	0	0	0	0	0.0	1.8	626	+1.8
Re-elect	0	0	0	0	0.0	1.2	411	+1.2
Save Markendale Nursey	0	0	0	0	0.0	0.7	232	+0.7
Independent	0	0	0	0	0.0	0.4	128	+0.4

== Ward results ==
Barton
Party	Candidate	Votes	%	±%
Labour	Kenneth Memory	786	55.5	−18.0
Conservative	Ruth Brook	340	24.0	+9.1
Liberal Democrats	Margaret Powis	289	20.4	+8.9
Majority		346	31.5	−27.1
Turnout		1,415	18.4	−2.0
Labour hold		Swing		

Blackfriars
Party	Candidate	Votes	%	±%
Labour	John Hincks	455	59.5	−15.7
Liberal Democrats	Marshall Peach	310	40.5	+15.7
Majority		145	19.0	−31.4
Turnout		765	13.4	−2.4
Labour hold		Swing		

Broughton
Party	Candidate	Votes	%	±%
Labour	James King	832	73.2	−4.2
Liberal Democrats	Susan Carson	304	26.8	+4.2
Majority		528	46.4	−8.4
Turnout		1,136	19.1	−0.7
Labour hold		Swing		

Cadishead (2)
Party	Candidate	Votes	%	±%
Labour	Christine Hudson	736		
Conservative	Thomas Holt	632		
Labour	Charles Wood	595		
Conservative	Leslie Taylor	536		
Liberal Democrats	Emma Rogers	148		
Liberal Democrats	Neville Rogers	136		
Turnout		2,783	23.2	−2.9
Labour hold		Swing		
Conservative gain from Labour		Swing		

Claremont
Party	Candidate	Votes	%	±%
Liberal Democrats	Bernard Carson	1,224	48.7	+5.6
Labour	Barbara Miller	717	28.5	−13.0
Conservative	Christopher Davies	574	22.8	+7.4
Majority		507	20.2	+18.6
Turnout		2,515	25.7	−0.6
Liberal Democrats gain from Labour		Swing		

Eccles
Party	Candidate	Votes	%	±%
Labour	Edmund Sheehy	1,015	45.6	−10.7
Conservative	Michael Edwards	791	35.5	+7.9
Liberal Democrats	Christine Lomax	422	18.9	+2.8
Majority		224	10.1	−18.6
Turnout		2,228	24.5	−0.0
Labour hold		Swing		

Irlam
Party	Candidate	Votes	%	±%
Labour	Roger Lightup	814	50.1	−11.6
Conservative	Elizabeth Hill	596	36.7	+7.7
Liberal Democrats	Julie Wenham	214	13.2	+3.9
Majority		218	13.4	−19.3
Turnout		1,624	22.2	−2.7
Labour hold		Swing		

Kersal
Party	Candidate	Votes	%	±%
Labour	Davina Miller	890	56.9	−4.9
Conservative	Hillary Lingard	362	23.2	−1.8
Liberal Democrats	Samuel Portnoy	223	14.3	+1.0
Liberal	Cameron Barlow	88	5.6	+5.6
Majority		528	33.7	−3.1
Turnout		1,563	18.1	+0.2
Labour hold		Swing		

Langworthy
Party	Candidate	Votes	%	±%
Labour	Christopher Beaumont	407	42.3	−15.7
Liberal	Christopher Barnes	323	33.5	+33.5
Liberal Democrats	Barrie Jones	233	24.2	−7.8
Majority		84	8.8	−27.2
Turnout		963	16.9	+1.6
Labour hold		Swing		

Little Hulton
Party	Candidate	Votes	%	±%
Labour	Alice Smyth	725	65.1	−7.7
Conservative	Jane McInnes	226	20.3	+4.5
Liberal Democrats	Jean Blainey	163	14.6	+3.2
Majority		499	44.8	−12.2
Turnout		1,114	15.3	+2.2
Labour hold		Swing		

Ordsall
Party	Candidate	Votes	%	±%
Labour	Peter Dobbs	426	53.3	−24.7
Save Markendale Nursey	Ann Gibbons	232	29.0	+29.0
Liberal Democrats	Mariska Jones	75	9.4	−12.6
Liberal	Charles Broadhurst	66	8.3	+8.3
Majority		194	24.3	−31.7
Turnout		799	15.4	+0.6
Labour hold		Swing		

Pendlebury
Party	Candidate	Votes	%	±%
Labour	Patricia Lea	1,023	50.5	−21.2
Conservative	Marjorie Weston	540	26.7	+11.2
Liberal Democrats	Valerie Gregory	461	22.8	+6.5
Majority		483	23.8	−21.4
Turnout		2,024	19.2	−1.5
Labour hold		Swing		

Pendleton
Party	Candidate	Votes	%	±%
Labour	Joseph Holt	652	56.5	−17.7
Conservative	Edith Moores	200	17.3	+6.2
Liberal Democrats	Lynn Drake	152	13.2	−1.5
Liberal	Andrew Priest	149	12.9	+12.9
Majority		452	39.2	−20.3
Turnout		1,153	17.1	−2.1
Labour hold		Swing		

Swinton North
Party	Candidate	Votes	%	±%
Labour	Charles William Hinds	915	48.8	−17.3
Conservative	Neil Levay	551	29.4	+10.5
Liberal Democrats	Lynda Revell	410	21.9	+10.0
Majority		364	19.4	−27.8
Turnout		1,876	20.9	−1.4
Labour hold		Swing		

Swinton South
Party	Candidate	Votes	%	±%
Conservative	Christine Upton	984	42.7	+10.7
Labour	James Short	851	36.9	−15.2
Liberal Democrats	Paul Gregory	469	20.4	+4.5
Majority		131	5.8	−14.3
Turnout		2,304	23.3	+0.0
Conservative gain from Labour		Swing		

Walkden North
Party	Candidate	Votes	%	±%
Labour	Elizabeth Payne	880	51.3	−31.7
Re-elect	Melvyn Higson	411	23.9	+23.9
Conservative	Lisa Dugmore	279	16.2	+16.2
Liberal Democrats	Barbara Wolstencroft	147	8.6	−8.4
Majority		469	27.4	−38.6
Turnout		1,717	20.5	+0.1
Labour hold		Swing		

Walkden South
Party	Candidate	Votes	%	±%
Labour	Stanley Witkowski	1,008	40.0	−14.2
Conservative	John Mosley	830	32.9	+8.5
Liberal Democrats	Audrey Hunt	554	22.0	+0.6
Independent	Peter McHale	128	5.1	+5.1
Majority		178	7.1	−22.7
Turnout		2,520	20.9	−0.9
Labour hold		Swing		

Weaste & Seedley
Party	Candidate	Votes	%	±%
Liberal Democrats	Janice Heywood	868	45.3	+22.5
Labour	David Jolley	634	33.1	−28.7
Conservative	Sydney Cooper	415	21.6	+6.1
Majority		234	12.2	−26.8
Turnout		1,917	25.9	+4.2
Liberal Democrats gain from Labour		Swing		

Winton
Party	Candidate	Votes	%	±%
Labour	David Eglin	838	50.0	−18.0
Liberal Democrats	Pauline Ogden	436	26.0	−6.0
Conservative	Judith Tope	402	24.0	+24.0
Majority		402	24.0	−12.0
Turnout		1,676	18.4	−2.4
Labour hold		Swing		

Worsley & Boothstown
Party	Candidate	Votes	%	±%
Conservative	Karen Garrido	1,597	45.4	+9.8
Liberal Democrats	Sara Bradbury	1,474	41.9	−5.0
Labour	Peter Wheeler	447	12.7	−4.8
Majority		123	3.5	−7.8
Turnout		3,518	31.3	−2.7
Conservative gain from Liberal Democrats		Swing		
