= 2000 Herefordshire Council election =

2000 UK local government election

The 2000 Herefordshire Council election was held on 4 May 2000 to elect all councillors on Herefordshire Council.

All 37 wards were contested - each electing either one or two members to the council. The election resulted in the council passing into "no overall control" with the Liberal Democrats, who held 21 seats, forming the largest group in the council chamber.

== Results ==
Herefordshire local election result 2000
| Party | Seats | Gains | Losses | Net gain/loss | Seats % | Votes % | Votes | +/− |
|---|---|---|---|---|---|---|---|---|
| Liberal Democrats | 21 | 21 | - | +21 | 36.21 | 31.4 | 18,119 | |
| Conservative | 20 | 20 | - | +20 | 34.5 | 42.0 | 24,576 | |
| Independent | 7 | 7 | - | +7 | 12.0 | 13.3 | 7,789 | |
| Labour | 4 | 4 | - | +4 | 6.9 | 8.1 | 4,721 | |
| Green | 1 | 1 | - | +1 | 1.7 | 4.3 | 2,538 | |
| Protect Ross-on-Wye | 0 | 0 | - | - | 0.0 | 0.54 | 317 | |
| Herefordshire People Before Politics | 0 | 0 | - | - | 0.0 | 0.49 | 291 | |
| BNP | 0 | 0 | - | - | 0.0 | 0.18 | 109 | |

The overall turnout was 39.12% with a total of 58,460 valid votes cast. A total of 283 ballots were rejected.

== Council Composition ==
After the election, the composition of the council was:

↓
| 21 | 20 | 7 | 4 | 1 |
| Liberal Democrats | Conservative | Independent | Labour | G |

G - Green Party

== Ward results ==
All councillors elected will serve a three-year term. All results are listed below:

=== Aylestone ===
Aylestone (2 Seats)
| Party | Candidate | Votes | % | ±% |
|---|---|---|---|---|
| Liberal Democrats | Colin George Rumsey | 486 | 21.08 | |
| Liberal Democrats | Susan Andrews | 480 | 20.82 | |
| Conservative | Paul Rone | 417 | 18.08 | |
| Conservative | Peter Stanton Berry | 396 | 17.17 | |
| Truly Independent | Peter George England | 290 | 12.58 | |
| Green | David Bright Gillett | 132 | 5.72 | |
| Green | Adam Frank Jethro Boardman | 105 | 4.55 | |
| Majority | | 63 | 2.74 | |
| Turnout | | 2,306 | 29.65 | |
| Liberal Democrats hold | | Swing | | |
| Liberal Democrats hold | | Swing | | |

=== Backbury ===
Backbury (1 Seat)
| Party | Candidate | Votes | % | ±% |
|---|---|---|---|---|
| Conservative | Josephine Elisabeth Pemberton | 545 | 54.34 | |
| Liberal Democrats | David James Sudlow | 458 | 45.66 | |
| Majority | | 87 | 8.68 | |
| Turnout | | 1,003 | 45.84 | |
| Conservative hold | | Swing | | |

=== Belmont ===
Belmont (2 Seats)
| Party | Candidate | Votes | % | ±% |
|---|---|---|---|---|
| Liberal Democrats | John Walter Newman | 664 | 40.02 | |
| Liberal Democrats | Clement Allan Tudge | 627 | 37.80 | |
| Labour | David Stewart Thomson | 187 | 11.27 | |
| Conservative | Stewart Arthur Morgan | 98 | 5.91 | |
| Conservative | Henry Ball | 83 | 5.00 | |
| Majority | | 440 | 26.53 | |
| Turnout | | 1,659 | 23.53 | |
| Liberal Democrats hold | | Swing | | |
| Liberal Democrats hold | | Swing | | |

=== Bircher ===
Bircher (1 Seat)
| Party | Candidate | Votes | % | ±% |
|---|---|---|---|---|
| Conservative | John Pudge Price | 699 | 50.84 | |
| Independent | William Luis Sebastian Bowen | 676 | 49.16 | |
| Majority | | 23 | 1.68 | |
| Turnout | | 1,375 | 61.66 | |
| Conservative hold | | Swing | | |

=== Bringsty ===
Bringsty (1 Seat)
| Party | Candidate | Votes | % | ±% |
|---|---|---|---|---|
| Conservative | Thomas William Hunt | 538 | 54.62 | |
| Independent | David Cave | 337 | 34.21 | |
| Green | Clara Mat Slater | 110 | 11.17 | |
| Majority | | 227 | 23.04 | |
| Turnout | | 985 | 42.68 | |
| Conservative hold | | Swing | | |

=== Bromyard ===
Bromyard (2 Seats)
| Party | Candidate | Votes | % | ±% |
|---|---|---|---|---|
| Conservative | Richard Edward James | 917 | 34.31 | |
| Independent | Christopher John Grover | 650 | 24.32 | |
| Independent | Bernard Hunt | 565 | 21.14 | |
| Independent | William Albert Gibbard | 270 | 10.10 | |
| Liberal Democrats | Terence Leonard Kimberley White | 162 | 6.06 | |
| BNP | John Bernard Haycock | 71 | 2.65 | |
| BNP | Tracy Michael Paton | 38 | 1.42 | |
| Majority | | 85 | 3.18 | |
| Turnout | | 2,673 | 35.40 | |
| Conservative hold | | Swing | | |
| Independent hold | | Swing | | |

=== Brumarsh ===
Brumarsh (1 Seat)
| Party | Candidate | Votes | % | ±% |
|---|---|---|---|---|
| Conservative | John Gerrans Stuart Guthrie | 595 | 53.70 | |
| Liberal Democrats | Roland Charles Summers | 351 | 31.68 | |
| Labour | Roy Brookes Hall | 162 | 14.62 | |
| Majority | | 244 | 22.02 | |
| Turnout | | 1,108 | 36.02 | |
| Conservative hold | | Swing | | |

=== Central ===
Central (2 Seats)
| Party | Candidate | Votes | % | ±% |
|---|---|---|---|---|
| Liberal Democrats | David John Fleet | 373 | 17.95 | |
| Liberal Democrats | Basil Cuthbert Baldwin | 365 | 17.56 | |
| Green | Michael John Harrison | 307 | 14.78 | |
| Conservative | Andrew Philip Law | 303 | 14.58 | |
| Green | Julia Parker-Harris | 289 | 13.91 | |
| Conservative | Patricia Edith Paul | 272 | 13.09 | |
| Labour | Sylvia Petula Ann Daniels | 169 | 8.13 | |
| Majority | | 58 | 2.78 | |
| Turnout | | 2,078 | 30.16 | |
| Liberal Democrats hold | | Swing | | |
| Liberal Democrats hold | | Swing | | |

=== Credenhill ===
Credenhill (1 Seat)
| Party | Candidate | Votes | % | ±% |
|---|---|---|---|---|
| Independent | Robert Ivor Matthews | 486 | 62.55 | |
| Liberal Democrats | Terence Edmond John Smissen | 214 | 27.54 | |
| Herefordshire: People Before Politics | Timothy Charles Lewis | 77 | 9.91 | |
| Majority | | 137 | 35.01 | |
| Turnout | | 777 | 33.71 | |
| Independent hold | | Swing | | |

=== Dinmore Hill ===
Dinmore Hill (1 Seat)
| Party | Candidate | Votes | % | ±% |
|---|---|---|---|---|
| Conservative | James Richard Makin | 521 | 52.00 | |
| Liberal Democrats | Lionel John Meredith | 481 | 48.00 | |
| Majority | | 40 | 4.00 | |
| Turnout | | 41.08 | 1,002 | |
| Conservative hold | | Swing | | |

=== Frome ===
Frome (1 Seat)
| Party | Candidate | Votes | % | ±% |
|---|---|---|---|---|
| Green | Guy Harry Morgan Woodford | 673 | 59.19 | |
| Conservative | Richard John Gavin Fowler | 464 | 40.81 | |
| Majority | | 209 | 18.38 | |
| Turnout | | 1,137 | 47.08 | |
| Green hold | | Swing | | |

=== Golden Cross ===
Golden Cross (1 Seat)
| Party | Candidate | Votes | % | ±% |
|---|---|---|---|---|
| Conservative | Roger James Phillips | 824 | 80.94 | |
| Liberal Democrats | Rodney Broadwood Kilvert | 194 | 19.06 | |
| Majority | | 630 | 61.88 | |
| Turnout | | 1,018 | 53.26 | |
| Conservative hold | | Swing | | |

=== Golden Valley ===
Golden Valley (1 Seat)
| Party | Candidate | Votes | % | ±% |
|---|---|---|---|---|
| Independent | Arthur Graham Morgan | 477 | 43.13 | |
| Liberal Democrats | Adrian Holt | 338 | 30.56 | |
| Conservative | Raymond Maxwell Chillington | 247 | 22.33 | |
| Green | Paul Andrew Sullivan | 44 | 3.98 | |
| Majority | | 139 | 12.57 | |
| Turnout | | 1,106 | 48.28 | |
| Independent hold | | Swing | | |

=== Hagley ===
Hagley (1 Seat)
| Party | Candidate | Votes | % | ±% |
|---|---|---|---|---|
| Liberal Democrats | Alan Williams | 490 | 50.99 | |
| Conservative | Nicholas Justin Howells | 471 | 49.01 | |
| Majority | | 19 | 1.98 | |
| Turnout | | 961 | 37.61 | |
| Liberal Democrats hold | | Swing | | |

=== Hampton Court ===
Hampton Court (1 Seat)
| Party | Candidate | Votes | % | ±% |
|---|---|---|---|---|
| Liberal Democrats | Michael John Kimbery | 574 | 61.59 | |
| Conservative | Allan Lloyd | 358 | 38.41 | |
| Majority | | 216 | 23.18 | |
| Turnout | | 932 | 48.25 | |
| Liberal Democrats hold | | Swing | | |

=== Hinton ===
Hinton (2 Seats)
| Party | Candidate | Votes | % | ±% |
|---|---|---|---|---|
| Labour | Arthur Christopher Richard Chappell | 588 | 31.28 | |
| Labour | Winefride Ursula Attfield | 415 | 22.07 | |
| Liberal Democrats | Aubrey Thomas Oliver | 293 | 15.58 | |
| Independent | David Richard Chatfield | 268 | 14.26 | |
| Conservative | John Lawrence Nowell | 174 | 9.26 | |
| Conservative | Carol Ellen Courtenay Cranch | 142 | 7.55 | |
| Majority | | 122 | 6.49 | |
| Turnout | | 1880 | 31.61 | |
| Labour hold | | Swing | | |
| Labour hold | | Swing | | |

=== Hollington ===
Hollington (1 Seat)
| Party | Candidate | Votes | % | ±% |
|---|---|---|---|---|
| Liberal Democrats | William John Stuart Thomas | 320 | 38.60 | |
| Independent | Ellis Anthony Owen | 279 | 33.66 | |
| Conservative | Alan Wilson Pritchard | 230 | 27.74 | |
| Majority | | 41 | 4.94 | |
| Turnout | | 829 | 35.71 | |
| Liberal Democrats hold | | Swing | | |

=== Holmer ===
Holmer (2 Seats)
| Party | Candidate | Votes | % | ±% |
|---|---|---|---|---|
| Liberal Democrats | Polly Andrews | 526 | 28.68 | |
| Liberal Democrats | Peter Derwent Evans | 435 | 23.72 | |
| Conservative | Isla Jean Owen | 347 | 18.92 | |
| Conservative | Patricia Woollard | 321 | 17.50 | |
| Labour | Robert Douglas Hardwick | 205 | 11.18 | |
| Majority | | 88 | 4.80 | |
| Turnout | | 1,834 | 19.34 | |
| Liberal Democrats hold | | Swing | | |
| Liberal Democrats hold | | Swing | | |

=== Hope End ===
Hope End (2 Seats)
| Party | Candidate | Votes | % | ±% |
|---|---|---|---|---|
| Conservative | Roy Vincent Stockton | 1,170 | 32.99 | |
| Conservative | Rees Mills | 991 | 27.95 | |
| Liberal Democrats | June Patricia Armstrong | 900 | 25.38 | |
| Green | Katrina Emma Turnbull | 485 | 13.68 | |
| Majority | | 91 | 2.57 | |
| Turnout | | 3,546 | 46.20 | |
| Conservative hold | | Swing | | |
| Conservative hold | | Swing | | |

=== Kington ===
Kington (1 Seat)
| Party | Candidate | Votes | % | ±% |
|---|---|---|---|---|
| Liberal Democrats | Terence Morgan James | 661 | 50.77 | |
| Conservative | Elizabeth Christine Shayler | 558 | 42.86 | |
| Herefordshire People Before Politics | John Francis Kelly | 83 | 6.37 | |
| Majority | | 103 | 7.91 | |
| Turnout | | 1,302 | 49.44 | |
| Liberal Democrats hold | | Swing | | |

=== Ledbury ===
Ledbury (2 Seats)
| Party | Candidate | Votes | % | ±% |
|---|---|---|---|---|
| Conservative | Peter Edward Harling | 888 | 33.29 | |
| Liberal Democrats | Barry Frank Ashton | 646 | 24.21 | |
| Conservative | Jonathan Richard Mills | 579 | 21.70 | |
| Labour | Noel Roberts | 281 | 10.53 | |
| Liberal Democrats | Edwin James Davey | 274 | 10.27 | |
| Majority | | 67 | 2.51 | |
| Turnout | | 2,668 | 35.41 | |
| Conservative hold | | Swing | | |
| Liberal Democrats hold | | Swing | | |

=== Leominster East & South ===
Leominster East & South (2 Seats)
| Party | Candidate | Votes | % | ±% |
|---|---|---|---|---|
| Conservative | Dick Burke | 645 | 29.38 | |
| Labour | John Parry Thomas | 568 | 25.88 | |
| Conservative | Catherine Mary Fothergill | 550 | 25.06 | |
| Labour | Patricia Mary Hale | 432 | 19.68 | |
| Majority | | 18 | 0.82 | |
| Turnout | | 2,195 | 28.65 | |
| Conservative hold | | Swing | | |
| Labour hold | | Swing | | |

=== Leominster North ===
Leominster North (2 Seats)
| Party | Candidate | Votes | % | ±% |
|---|---|---|---|---|
| Conservative | Peter Jones | 575 | 23.65 | |
| Conservative | June Patricia French | 569 | 23.41 | |
| Liberal Democrats | Gordon John Morris | 403 | 16.58 | |
| Liberal Democrats | Wendy Dorothy Jancey | 305 | 12.55 | |
| Labour | Peter John Goody | 233 | 9.58 | |
| Labour | Colin Leslie Tether | 227 | 9.34 | |
| Independent | Nicklas Nenadich | 119 | 4.89 | |
| Majority | | 166 | 6.83 | |
| Turnout | | 2,431 | 31.18 | |
| Conservative hold | | Swing | | |
| Conservative hold | | Swing | | |

=== Lyonshall With Titley ===
Lyonshall With Titley (1 Seat)
| Party | Candidate | Votes | % | ±% |
|---|---|---|---|---|
| Conservative | Pauline Robinson | 614 | 65.18 | |
| Liberal Democrats | Brian Williams Lewis | 274 | 29.09 | |
| Green | David Oliver | 54 | 5.73 | |
| Majority | | 340 | 36.09 | |
| Turnout | | 942 | 53.69 | |
| Conservative hold | | Swing | | |

=== Marcle Ridge ===
Marcle Ridge (1 Seat)
| Party | Candidate | Votes | % | ±% |
|---|---|---|---|---|
| Independent | Donald William Rule | 749 | 54.91 | |
| Conservative | Frances Anne Jordan | 615 | 45.09 | |
| Majority | | 134 | 9.82 | |
| Turnout | | 1,364 | 37.56 | |
| Independent hold | | Swing | | |

=== Merbach ===
Merbach (1 Seat)
| Party | Candidate | Votes | % | ±% |
|---|---|---|---|---|
| Conservative | Nigel John Jones Davies | 544 | 55.57 | |
| Liberal Democrats | June Margaret Pickering | 435 | 44.43 | |
| Majority | | 109 | 11.14 | |
| Turnout | | 979 | 48.45 | |
| Conservative hold | | Swing | | |

=== Mortimer ===
Mortimer (1 Seat)
| Party | Candidate | Votes | % | ±% |
|---|---|---|---|---|
| Conservative | Lilian Olwyn Barnett | 705 | 65.95 | |
| Liberal Democrats | Andrew Coles | 364 | 34.05 | |
| Majority | | 341 | 31.90 | |
| Turnout | | 1,069 | 52.78 | |
| Conservative hold | | Swing | | |

=== Old Gore ===
Old Gore (1 Seat)
| Party | Candidate | Votes | % | ±% |
|---|---|---|---|---|
| Independent | John William Edwards | 516 | 60.00 | |
| Liberal Democrats | Lucy Helen Green | 344 | 40.00 | |
| Majority | | 172 | 20.00 | |
| Turnout | | 860 | 40.67 | |
| Independent hold | | Swing | | |

=== Penyard ===
Penyard (1 Seat)
| Party | Candidate | Votes | % | ±% |
|---|---|---|---|---|
| True Independent | Eunice-May Saunders | 703 | 59.93 | |
| Conservative | David Michael Hoddinott | 470 | 40.07 | |
| Majority | | 233 | 19.86 | |
| Turnout | | 1,173 | 47.56 | |
| True Independent hold | | Swing | | |

=== Ross-on-Wye East ===
Ross-on-Wye East (2 Seats)
| Party | Candidate | Votes | % | ±% |
|---|---|---|---|---|
| Independent | Joyce Helen Thomas | 1,274 | 42.27 | |
| Liberal Democrats | Cynthia Joyce Davis | 596 | 19.77 | |
| Conservative | Gordon Lucas | 455 | 15.10 | |
| Conservative | Lilian Violet Jacqueline Danter | 372 | 12.34 | |
| Protect Ross-on-Wye | Constance Eileen Edwards | 190 | 6.31 | |
| Protect Ross-on-Wye | Stuart John Morgan | 127 | 4.21 | |
| Majority | | 141 | 4.67 | |
| Turnout | | 3,014 | 35.74 | |
| Independent hold | | Swing | | |
| Liberal Democrats hold | | Swing | | |

=== Ross-on-Wye West ===
Ross-on-Wye West (2 Seats)
| Party | Candidate | Votes | % | ±% |
|---|---|---|---|---|
| Liberal Democrats | Mark Robert Cunningham | 532 | 28.58 | |
| Liberal Democrats | Anthony John Allen | 497 | 26.71 | |
| Conservative | Phillip Grenfell Haydn Cutter | 458 | 24.61 | |
| Conservative | Michael Jennings | 374 | 20.10 | |
| Majority | | 39 | 2.10 | |
| Turnout | | 1,861 | 28.82 | |
| Liberal Democrats hold | | Swing | | |
| Liberal Democrats hold | | Swing | | |

=== St. Martins ===
St. Martins (2 Seats)
| Party | Candidate | Votes | % | ±% |
|---|---|---|---|---|
| Liberal Democrats | Robin John Andrews | 429 | 25.75 | |
| Labour | Robert Preece | 328 | 19.69 | |
| Labour | Laurence Noble | 278 | 16.69 | |
| Liberal Democrats | Richard Thomas | 268 | 16.09 | |
| Residents | Wendy Jane Jones | 130 | 7.80 | |
| Conservative | Gillian Rosamond Clifford | 121 | 7.26 | |
| Conservative | Marsha Elizabeth Barnsley | 112 | 6.72 | |
| Majority | | 50 | 3.00 | |
| Turnout | | 1,666 | 27.29 | |
| Liberal Democrats hold | | Swing | | |
| Labour hold | | Swing | | |

=== St. Nicholas ===
St. Nicholas (2 Seats)
| Party | Candidate | Votes | % | ±% |
|---|---|---|---|---|
| Liberal Democrats | Evaline Mary Bew | 436 | 26.39 | |
| Liberal Democrats | David Cyril Short | 409 | 24.76 | |
| Conservative | Charlotte Williams Lewis | 289 | 17.49 | |
| Conservative | Anthony Edwin Allen Woollard | 264 | 15.98 | |
| Labour | John George Davies | 254 | 15.38 | |
| Majority | | 120 | 7.27 | |
| Turnout | | 1,652 | 27.73 | |
| Liberal Democrats hold | | Swing | | |
| Liberal Democrats hold | | Swing | | |

=== Three Elms ===
Three Elms (2 Seats)
| Party | Candidate | Votes | % | ±% |
|---|---|---|---|---|
| Conservative | Jason Hankins | 574 | 25.14 | |
| Liberal Democrats | Leslie Mervyn Henson Andrews | 517 | 22.65 | |
| Conservative | Arthur George Staton | 502 | 21.99 | |
| Liberal Democrats | Fiona Evelyn Mary Chiswell | 471 | 20.63 | |
| Labour | Elizabeth Helen Ruck | 219 | 9.59 | |
| Majority | | 15 | 0.66 | |
| Turnout | | 2,283 | 29.20 | |
| Conservative hold | | Swing | | |
| Liberal Democrats hold | | Swing | | |

=== Tupsley ===
Tupsley (2 Seats)
| Party | Candidate | Votes | % | ±% |
|---|---|---|---|---|
| Conservative | Jane Ann Carter | 808 | 24.19 | |
| Liberal Democrats | Marcelle Denise Lloys-Hayes | 772 | 23.11 | |
| Liberal Democrats | William James Walling | 752 | 22.52 | |
| Conservative | Susan Diane Trout | 702 | 21.02 | |
| Labour | Richard Attfield | 175 | 5.24 | |
| Herefordshire: People Before Politics | Simon Christopher David Zeigler | 131 | 3.92 | |
| Majority | | 20 | 0.59 | |
| Turnout | | 3,340 | 35.7 | |
| Conservative hold | | Swing | | |
| Liberal Democrats hold | | Swing | | |

=== Upton ===
Upton (1 Seat)
| Party | Candidate | Votes | % | ±% |
|---|---|---|---|---|
| Conservative | John Stone | 732 | 68.35 | |
| Green | Gary Nicholas Burton | 339 | 31.65 | |
| Majority | | 393 | 36.70 | |
| Turnout | | 1,071 | 46.84 | |
| Conservative hold | | Swing | | |

=== Weobley ===
Weobley (1 Seat)
| Party | Candidate | Votes | % | ±% |
|---|---|---|---|---|
| Conservative | John Hutcheson Ruell Goodwin | 622 | 58.90 | |
| Liberal Democrats | Christine Ferguson | 434 | 41.10 | |
| Majority | | 188 | 17.80 | |
| Turnout | | 1,056 | | |
| Conservative hold | | Swing | | |
