= 1999 Burnley Borough Council election =

1999 UK local government election

The 1999 Burnley Borough Council election took place on 6 May 1999 to elect members of Burnley Borough Council in Lancashire, England. One third of the council was up for election and the Labour Party stayed in overall control of the council.

After the election, the composition of the council was:

- Labour 31
- Liberal Democrat 9
- Independent 5
- Conservative 3

== Campaign ==
Seventeen seats were contested in the election, with two vacancies in Rosehill ward. Labour were the only party to contest all 17 seats, with the other candidates coming from the Liberal Democrats, Conservatives and Independents. A record nine independents stood in the election in which they were defending seats in Lowerhouse, Queensgate and Rosehill, in all of which councillors had previously defected from Labour.

The election saw controversy in Daneshouse ward where a police enquiry was launched after complaints of voters being assigned proxy votes without their permission. Out of an electorate of 4,158, over 1,100 had proxy votes with an estimate that 775 would be for Liberal Democrats as against 375 for Labour. The Liberal Democrat candidate, Mozaquir Ali, said he would call for the election to be re-run if he lost, as a council electoral officer had given him incorrect advice on the eligibility of some proxy votes. The situation in Daneshouse partly led to the government reviewing the law on proxy votes to ensure they were not misused to guarantee votes. Meanwhile, the police enquiry would last for nearly a year but eventually decided no action should be taken.

The police were again asked to investigate due to claims in an Independent candidate's leaflet. Labour said that the claim that they reduced rates on their own party offices was misleading and in contravention of the Representation of the People Act 1983.

== Election result ==
The results of the election saw all four groups on the council remain at the same number of seats, with Labour keeping their majority on the council. The only seat changes came in Brunshaw where the Independent took a seat from Labour and in Lanehead where Labour took a seat back. Overall turnout in the election was 28%.

The hard-fought contest in Danehouse ward saw the Liberal Democrat Mozaquir Ali win the election by 216 over Saeed Akhtar Chaudhary from Labour. Turnout in the ward was a record 70% substantially higher than in the rest of Burnley. On the day after the election fighting broke out in Danehouse ward between supporters of Labour and the Liberal Democrats with the police needed to separate the two groups, while the Labour candidate and his son were hit by a vehicle.

Burnley local election result 1999
Party	Seats	Gains	Losses	Net gain/loss	Seats %	Votes %	Votes	+/−
Labour	9	1	1	0	52.9			
Liberal Democrats	4	0	0	0	19.0			
Independent	3	1	1	0	17.6			
Conservative	1	0	0	0	5.9			
