= 2000 Rossendale Borough Council election =

Election in Lancashire, England

Elections to Rossendale Borough Council were held on 4 May 2000. One third of the council was up for election and the Conservative party took overall control of the council from the Labour party.

After the election, the composition of the council was

- Conservative 24
- Labour 12

== Election result ==
Rossendale local election result 2000
Party	Seats	Gains	Losses	Net gain/loss	Seats %	Votes %	Votes	+/−
Conservative	11			+9	91.7			
Labour	1			-9	8.3			
