= 2000 Newcastle-under-Lyme Borough Council election =

2000 UK local government election

Elections to Newcastle-under-Lyme Borough Council were held on 4 May 2000. One third of the council was up for election and the Labour Party kept overall control of the council.

After the election, the composition of the council was:

- Labour 30
- Liberal Democrat 16
- Conservative 9
- Independent 1

== Election result ==
Newcastle-under-Lyme local election result 2000
| Party | Seats | Gains | Losses | Net gain/loss | Seats % | Votes % | Votes | +/− |
|---|---|---|---|---|---|---|---|---|
| Labour | 7 | | | -6 | 38.9 | | | |
| Liberal Democrats | 7 | | | +4 | 38.9 | | | |
| Conservative | 3 | | | +2 | 16.7 | | | |
| Independent | 1 | | | 0 | 5.6 | | | |
