= 2000 Knowsley Metropolitan Borough Council election =

2000 UK local government election

Elections to Knowsley Metropolitan Borough Council were held on 4 May 2000. One third of the council was up for election and the Labour party kept overall control of the council. Overall turnout was 18.0%. The election in Longview ward was postponed until June.

After the election, the composition of the council was

- Labour 61
- Liberal Democrat 4

== Election result ==
Knowsley local election result 2000
Party	Seats	Gains	Losses	Net gain/loss	Seats %	Votes %	Votes	+/−
Labour	18			-2	85.7	60.3	11,388	-9.1%
Liberal Democrats	3			+2	14.3	24.2	4,567	+13.5%
Conservative	0			0	0	11.3	2,139	-0.7%
Independent	0			0	0	3.6	688	-4.1%
Socialist Labour	0			0	0	0.5	90	+0.3%

== Ward results ==
Cantril Farm
Party	Candidate	Votes	%	±%
Labour	Francis O'Rourke	296	54.4	−0.1
Independent	Ian Williams	224	41.2	−1.2
Conservative	Robert Arnall	24	4.4	+1.2
Majority		72	13.2	+1.2
Turnout		544	15.0	−1.8

Cherryfield
Party	Candidate	Votes	%	±%
Labour	Daniel Smith	435	67.8	−8.2
Independent	Norman Harris	157	24.5	+0.5
Conservative	Anthony Upham	50	7.8	+7.8
Majority		278	43.3	−8.7
Turnout		642	15.3	+0.1

Halewood East
Party	Candidate	Votes	%	±%
Liberal Democrats	David Smithson	1,154	65.9	+43.6
Labour	Keith McGhee	454	25.9	−36.8
Conservative	Gillian Robertson	142	8.1	−6.9
Majority		700	40.0	
Turnout		1,750	23.7	+4.0

Halewood South
Party	Candidate	Votes	%	±%
Labour	Roy Nicholson	458	67.8	
Liberal Democrats	Cecelia Saleemi	218	32.2	
Majority		240	35.6	
Turnout		676	16.6	

Halewood West
Party	Candidate	Votes	%	±%
Labour	Norman Hogg	459	67.2	−2.6
Liberal Democrats	Sarah Smithson	224	32.8	+2.6
Majority		235	34.4	−5.2
Turnout		683	15.5	−2.4

Kirkby Central
Party	Candidate	Votes	%	±%
Labour	John King	561	90.9	−2.5
Conservative	Charles Brent	56	9.1	+2.5
Majority		505	81.8	−5.0
Turnout		617	14.2	−3.2

Knowsley Park
Party	Candidate	Votes	%	±%
Labour	Michael Foulkes	501	56.0	−2.9
Conservative	Thomas Fagan	393	44.0	+2.9
Majority		108	12.0	−5.8
Turnout		894	17.5	−4.0

Northwood
Party	Candidate	Votes	%	±%
Labour	Patrick Williams	546	90.2	+23.5
Conservative	Andrew Pates	59	9.8	+7.2
Majority		487	80.4	+44.4
Turnout		605	16.4	−4.2

Page Moss
Party	Candidate	Votes	%	±%
Labour	Maragret Flaherty	534	70.0	
Liberal Democrats	June Porter	139	18.2	
Socialist Labour	Carole Whatham	90	11.8	
Majority		395	51.8	
Turnout		763	14.4	

Park
Party	Candidate	Votes	%	±%
Labour	Ernest Parker	605	59.8	−12.3
Independent	John Gallagher	297	29.3	+7.5
Conservative	Geoffrey Allen	110	10.9	+4.7
Majority		308	30.5	−19.8
Turnout		1,012	17.8	−2.7

Prescot East
Party	Candidate	Votes	%	±%
Liberal Democrats	Joseph McGarry	599	62.1	+18.2
Labour	Joan Molloy	366	37.9	−15.1
Majority		233	24.2	
Turnout		965	21.7	+0.0

Prescot West
Party	Candidate	Votes	%	±%
Liberal Democrats	Eric Byron	896	62.0	+11.2
Labour	Derek McEgan	548	38.0	−8.6
Majority		348	24.0	+19.8
Turnout		1,444	31.8	+2.8

Princess
Party	Candidate	Votes	%	±%
Labour	Kenneth McGlashan	467	80.1	
Liberal Democrats	William Sommerfield	116	19.9	
Majority		351	60.2	
Turnout		583	13.7	

Roby
Party	Candidate	Votes	%	±%
Labour	Christina O'Hare	766	45.2	−11.0
Conservative	Gary Robertson	689	40.7	+11.2
Liberal Democrats	Kathleen Lappin	229	13.5	+13.5
Independent	John Webster	10	0.6	−13.7
Majority		77	4.5	−22.2
Turnout		1,694	24.4	−1.6

St Gabriels
Party	Candidate	Votes	%	±%
Labour	Brian O'Hare	472	55.5	−33.2
Liberal Democrats	Alan Davis	312	36.7	+36.7
Conservative	Susan Ford	67	7.9	−3.4
Majority		160	18.8	−58.6
Turnout		851	19.4	−0.1

St Michaels
Party	Candidate	Votes	%	±%
Labour	Frederick Curran	578	79.9	
Liberal Democrats	Inagh Smith	145	20.1	
Majority		433	59.8	
Turnout		723	16.7	

Swanside
Party	Candidate	Votes	%	±%
Labour	Robert Maguire	858	70.7	−13.7
Conservative	Stephen McPartland	190	15.7	+0.1
Liberal Democrats	John Wynn	166	13.7	+13.7
Majority		668	55.0	−13.8
Turnout		1,214	20.3	−1.5

Tower Hill
Party	Candidate	Votes	%	±%
Labour	Raymond Halpin	529	88.5	−3.9
Conservative	Thomas Lee	69	11.5	+3.9
Majority		460	77.0	−7.8
Turnout		598	10.7	−1.9

Whiston North
Party	Candidate	Votes	%	±%
Labour	Michael Murphy	570	70.5	−8.0
Liberal Democrats	Ann Whatham	238	29.5	+8.0
Majority		332	41.0	−16.0
Turnout		808	15.9	−3.8

Whiston South
Party	Candidate	Votes	%	±%
Labour	George Howard	736	68.7	−9.0
Conservative	Mark Salmon	204	19.0	−3.3
Liberal Democrats	Michael Lappin	131	12.2	+12.2
Majority		532	49.7	−5.7
Turnout		1,071	19.0	−3.7

Whitefield
Party	Candidate	Votes	%	±%
Labour	Norman Keats	649	88.3	+15.9
Conservative	Lorna Gough	86	11.7	+5.4
Majority		563	76.6	+25.5
Turnout		735	13.8	−0.4
