= 2000 North Tyneside Metropolitan Borough Council election =

The 2000 North Tyneside Metropolitan Borough Council election to the North Tyneside Metropolitan Borough Council was held in 2000 alongside other local elections. Labour held control of the council after the election.

== Results summary ==
2000 North Tyneside Metropolitan Borough Council election
Party	This election			Full council			This election		
Party	Seats	Net	Seats %	Other	Total	Total %	Votes	Votes %	+/−
Labour	10	▼4	47.6	24	34	56.7	22,373	41.3	
Conservative	8	▲4	38.1	9	17	28.3	22,420	41.4	
Liberal Democrats	3	▲1	14.3	6	9	15.0	8,834	16.3	
Independent	0	▼	0.0	0	0	0.0	498	0.92	

== Ward results ==
=== Battle Hill ===
Battle Hill (1 seat)
Party	Candidate	Votes	%	±%
Liberal Democrats	E. Buckton	1,533	54.0	+1.4
Labour	M. Jones	1114	39.2	−8.2
Conservative	E. Smith	193	6.8	New
Majority		419	14.8	+9.5
Turnout			32.8	
Registered electors		8,683		
Liberal Democrats hold		Swing	▲4.8	

=== Benton ===
Benton (1 seat)
Party	Candidate	Votes	%	±%
Labour	M. Madden*	1,088	48.0	−27.6
Conservative	P. McIntyre	680	30.0	+8.6
Independent	T. Harding	498	22.0	New
Majority		408	18.0	−33.3
Turnout			34.6	
Registered electors		6,572		
Labour hold		Swing	▼18.1	

=== Camperdown ===
Camperdown (1 seat)
Party	Candidate	Votes	%	±%
Labour	J. Conway*	1,101	64.8	−13.4
Liberal Democrats	P. Gilmore	331	19.5	+4.7
Conservative	F. Austin	268	15.8	+8.8
Majority		770	45.3	−18.1
Turnout			24.2	
Registered electors		7,045		
Labour hold		Swing	▼9.1	

=== Chirton ===
Chirton (1 seat)
Party	Candidate	Votes	%	±%
Labour	J. Ross	1,043	66.8	−10.7
Conservative	T. Morgan	518	33.2	+21.9
Majority		525	33.6	−32.7
Turnout			28.5	
Registered electors		5,525		
Labour hold		Swing	▼16.3	

=== Collingwood ===
Collingwood (1 seat)
Party	Candidate	Votes	%	±%
Labour	I. Grayson	1,284	63.4	−19.6
Conservative	M. Carr	741	36.6	+19.6
Majority		543	26.8	−39.2
Turnout			30.3	
Registered electors		6,719		
Labour hold		Swing	▼19.6	

=== Cullercoats ===
Cullercoats (1 seat)
Party	Candidate	Votes	%	±%
Conservative	B. Stevens	2,185	54.4	+5.2
Labour	K. Smiles	1544	38.4	−12.4
Liberal Democrats	G. Moore	289	7.2	New
Majority		641	16.0	
Turnout			52.8	
Registered electors		7,622		
Conservative gain from Labour		Swing	▲8.8	

=== Holystone ===
Holystone (1 seat)
Party	Candidate	Votes	%	±%
Labour	R. Lackenby*	1,654	69.7	−14.5
Conservative	R. Phillifent	718	30.3	+14.5
Majority		936	39.5	−28.9
Turnout			24.8	
Registered electors		9,648		
Labour hold		Swing	▼14.5	

=== Howdon ===
Howdon (1 seat)
Party	Candidate	Votes	%	±%
Labour	T. Cruikshanks*	1,132	61.4	−14.7
Liberal Democrats	S. Farrell	713	38.6	+25.7
Majority		419	22.7	−40.5
Turnout			32.9	
Registered electors		5,618		
Labour hold		Swing	▼20.2	

=== Longbenton ===
Longbenton (1 seat)
Party	Candidate	Votes	%	±%
Labour	R. Fletcher*	946	64.7	+33.3
Liberal Democrats	K. McGarrigle	360	24.6	+13.7
Conservative	W. Perera	157	10.7	+7.3
Majority		586	40.1	
Turnout			32.7	
Registered electors		4,475		
Labour gain from Independent		Swing		

=== Monkseaton ===
Monkseaton (1 seat)
Party	Candidate	Votes	%	±%
Conservative	W. Jackson	2,135	59.2	+13.9
Labour	G. Stillaway	1045	29.0	−20.1
Liberal Democrats	J. Smith	429	11.9	New
Majority		1090	30.2	
Turnout			44.6	
Registered electors		8,094		
Conservative gain from Labour		Swing	▲17.0	

=== North Shields ===
North Shields (1 seat)
Party	Candidate	Votes	%	±%
Conservative	M. Van der Merwe	1,919	59.2	+23.0
Labour	H.Bruce*	1324	40.8	−14.0
Majority		595	18.3	
Turnout			39.2	
Registered electors		8,332		
Conservative gain from Labour		Swing	▲18.5	

=== Northumberland ===
Northumberland (1 seat)
Party	Candidate	Votes	%	±%
Liberal Democrats	M. Williamson	2,011	65.3	+25.4
Labour	S. McKean	932	30.3	−29.8
Conservative	P. Gill	135	4.4	New
Majority		1079	35.1	
Turnout			35.3	
Registered electors		8,740		
Liberal Democrats gain from Labour		Swing	▲27.6	

=== Riverside ===
Riverside (1 seat)
Party	Candidate	Votes	%	±%
Labour	R. Stringfellow*	968	61.7	−17.7
Liberal Democrats	D. Wood	376	23.9	New
Conservative	A. Austin	226	14.4	+5.1
Majority		592	37.7	
Turnout			25.4	
Registered electors		6,207		
Labour hold		Swing	▼20.8	

=== Seatonville ===
Seatonville (1 seat)
Party	Candidate	Votes	%	±%
Conservative	L. Hall	1,658	52.1	+22.7
Labour	P. Davison	783	24.6	−14.9
Liberal Democrats	E. Jellett	739	23.2	−7.9
Majority		875	27.5	
Turnout			43.7	
Registered electors		7,286		
Conservative gain from Labour		Swing	▲18.8	

=== St. Mary's ===
St. Mary's (2 seats)
Party	Candidate	Votes	%	±%
Conservative	E. Hodson	2,712		
Conservative	C. Morgan*	2,673		
Labour	M. Cross	713		
Labour	M. Ormston	615		
Turnout			48.2	
Registered electors		7,315		
Conservative hold		Swing	▲	
Conservative hold		Swing	▲	

=== Tynemouth ===
Tynemouth (1 seat)
Party	Candidate	Votes	%	±%
Conservative	L. Arkley*	2,032	65.4	+13.8
Labour	A. Walker	798	25.7	−16.0
Liberal Democrats	J. Smith	277	8.9	+2.3
Majority		1234	39.7	
Turnout			45.1	
Registered electors		6,908		
Conservative hold		Swing	▲14.9	

=== Valley ===
Valley (1 seat)
Party	Candidate	Votes	%	±%
Labour	A. Potter*	1,368	68.1	
Conservative	S. Summers	642	31.9	
Majority		726	36.1	
Turnout			29.1	
Registered electors		6,944		
Labour hold		Swing		

=== Wallsend ===
Wallsend (1 seat)
Party	Candidate	Votes	%	±%
Liberal Democrats	M. Huscroft*	1,500	64.0	−3.6
Labour	A. Keith	764	32.6	+0.2
Conservative	M. Smith	79	3.4	New
Majority		736	31.4	
Turnout			37.7	
Registered electors		6,229		
Liberal Democrats hold		Swing	▼1.9	

=== Weetslade ===
Weetslade (1 seat)
Party	Candidate	Votes	%	±%
Labour	J. Harrison*	1,402	54.9	−21.3
Conservative	A. Appleton	1150	45.1	+21.3
Majority		252	9.9	−42.4
Turnout			32.8	
Registered electors		7,808		
Labour hold		Swing	▲21.3	

=== Whitley Bay ===
Whitley Bay (1 seat)
Party	Candidate	Votes	%	±%
Conservative	M. McIntyre	1,599	60.8	+12.8
Labour	L. Darke	755	28.7	−17.6
Liberal Democrats	M. Rudling	276	10.5	+4.7
Majority		844	32.1	
Turnout			38.8	
Registered electors		6,811		
Conservative hold		Swing	▲15.2	
