= 2000 Adur District Council election =

2000 UK local government election

Elections to Adur District Council were held on 4 May 2000. One third of the council was up for election and the council stayed under no overall control. Overall turnout was 36.5%.

After the election, the composition of the council was:

- Conservative 15
- Labour 13
- Liberal Democrat 9
- Shoreham Beach Residents Association 2

== Results ==
Adur local election result 2000
Party	Seats	Gains	Losses	Net gain/loss	Seats %	Votes %	Votes	+/−
Conservative	10	6	0	+6	66.7	40.8	7,733	
Liberal Democrats	2	0	4	-4	13.3	22.9	4,343	
Shoreham Beach Residents Association	2	0	0	0	13.3	7.8	1,487	
Labour	1	0	2	-2	6.7	28.4	5,388	

== Ward results ==
Buckingham
Party	Candidate	Votes	%	±%
Conservative	Frances Fletcher	861	63.2	
Liberal Democrats	Andrew Miller	314	23.0	
Labour	Stephen Mear	188	13.8	
Majority		547	40.2	
Turnout		1,363	34.7	
Conservative hold		Swing		

Churchill
Party	Candidate	Votes	%	±%
Conservative	Antony Strudwick	476	37.6	
Labour	Ann Bridges	424	33.5	
Liberal Democrats	Christine Allen	365	28.9	
Majority		52	4.1	
Turnout		1,265	33.8	
Conservative gain from Liberal Democrats		Swing		

Cokeham
Party	Candidate	Votes	%	±%
Labour	Barry Mear	510	50.7	
Liberal Democrats	Tracey Clarke	256	25.4	
Conservative	Andrew McGregor	241	23.9	
Majority		254	25.3	
Turnout		1,007	28.1	
Labour hold		Swing		

Eastbrook
Party	Candidate	Votes	%	±%
Conservative	James Funnell	540	43.2	
Labour	Teana Ashley	530	42.3	
Liberal Democrats	Stephen Biggs	182	14.5	
Majority		10	0.9	
Turnout		1,252	35.9	
Conservative gain from Labour		Swing		

Hillside
Party	Candidate	Votes	%	±%
Conservative	Robert Dunn	585	44.1	
Labour	Jeanette White	460	34.6	
Liberal Democrats	Anne Abbott	283	21.3	
Majority		125	9.5	
Turnout		1,328	39.2	
Conservative gain from Liberal Democrats		Swing		

Manor
Party	Candidate	Votes	%	±%
Liberal Democrats	Barbara Runnalls	535	48.8	
Conservative	Felicity Deen	426	38.9	
Labour	Ronald Horne	135	12.3	
Majority		109	9.9	
Turnout		1,096	33.6	
Liberal Democrats hold		Swing		

Marine (2)
Party	Candidate	Votes	%	±%
Shoreham Beach Residents Association	Elizabeth McKinney	799		
Shoreham Beach Residents Association	Maurice Pitchford	688		
Conservative	Kay Haffenden	579		
Labour	Alan Mair	47		
Labour	Christopher Pescott	39		
Turnout		2,152	43.7	
Independent hold		Swing		
Independent hold		Swing		

Mash Barn
Party	Candidate	Votes	%	±%
Liberal Democrats	Sharon Wood	318	39.2	
Labour	Martin Horner	269	33.2	
Conservative	Paul Curtis	224	27.6	
Majority		49	6.0	
Turnout		811	28.2	
Liberal Democrats hold		Swing		

Peverel
Party	Candidate	Votes	%	±%
Conservative	Donald Phillips	500	41.5	
Liberal Democrats	Gillian Hammond	358	29.7	
Labour	Timothy Saddler	348	28.8	
Majority		142	11.8	
Turnout		1,206	38.2	
Conservative hold		Swing		

St. Nicolas
Party	Candidate	Votes	%	±%
Conservative	Brian Coomber	668	44.1	
Labour	Eileen Jones	538	35.5	
Liberal Democrats	David Steadman	310	20.4	
Majority		130	8.6	
Turnout		1,516	39.5	
Conservative hold		Swing		

Southlands
Party	Candidate	Votes	%	±%
Conservative	Paul Graysmark	580	44.8	
Labour	Nigel Sweet	548	42.3	
Liberal Democrats	Christian Dunford	167	12.9	
Majority		32	2.5	
Turnout		1,295	40.1	
Conservative gain from Labour		Swing		

Southwick Green (2)
Party	Candidate	Votes	%	±%
Conservative	David Ashley	633		
Conservative	Julie Searle	571		
Liberal Democrats	Martin King	521		
Liberal Democrats	John Hilditch	473		
Labour	Graham Bucknall	464		
Labour	Francis Partridge	385		
Turnout		3,047	42.6	
Conservative gain from Liberal Democrats		Swing		
Conservative gain from Liberal Democrats		Swing		

Widewater
Party	Candidate	Votes	%	±%
Conservative	Wendy Gray	849	52.6	
Labour	James Largue	503	31.2	
Liberal Democrats	Shriley Rance	261	16.2	
Majority		346	21.4	
Turnout		1,613	36.7	
Conservative hold		Swing		
