= 2000 Walsall Metropolitan Borough Council election =

2000 UK local government election

The 2000 Walsall Metropolitan Borough Council election took place on 4 May 2000 to elect members of Walsall Metropolitan Borough Council in the West Midlands, England. One third of the council was up for election and the Labour party lost overall control of the council to no overall control.

After the election, the composition of the council was

- Labour 27
- Conservative 26
- Liberal Democrat 7

== Election result ==
Walsall local election result 2000
Party	Seats	Gains	Losses	Net gain/loss	Seats %	Votes %	Votes	+/−
Conservative	11			+4	55.0			
Labour	6			-4	30.0			
Liberal Democrats	3			+1	15.0			
Independent	0			-1	0			
