= 2000 Penwith District Council election =

2000 UK local government election

Elections to Penwith District Council were held on 4 May 2000. One third of the council was up for election and the council stayed under no overall control. Overall turnout was 30.9%

After the election, the composition of the council was:

- Conservative 10
- Independent 9
- Liberal Democrat 7
- Others 5
- Labour 3

== Results ==
Penwith local election result 2000
Party	Seats	Gains	Losses	Net gain/loss	Seats %	Votes %	Votes	+/−
Conservative	3			+1	27.3			
Independent	3			+2	27.3			
Liberal Democrats	2			-2	18.2			
Others	2			+1	18.2			
Labour	1			-2	9.1			
