= 2000 Calderdale Metropolitan Borough Council election =

2000 UK local government election

- 4 May 2000

17 of 54 seats on Calderdale Metropolitan Borough Council 28 seats needed for a majority

	First party	Second party	Third party
Party	Conservative	Liberal Democrats	Labour
Seats won	11	5	1
Seats after	28	15	10
Seat change	▲9	▲1	▼10
Leader before election
Labour
Leader after election
Conservative

Elections to Calderdale Metropolitan Borough Council were held on 4 May 2000. One third of the council was up for election and the Conservative Party gained overall control of the council from no overall control. The total turnout of the election was 28.97% (40,190 voters of an electorate of 138,748). The winning candidate in each ward is highlighted in bold.

After the election, the composition of the council was

- Conservative 28
- Liberal Democrats 15
- Labour 10
- Independent 1

== Ward results ==
=== Brighouse ward ===
Brighouse ward
Party	Candidate	Votes	%	±%
Independent	**Colin Stout**	951	39.20	
Conservative	Thiruvenkatar Krishnapillai	737	30.37	
Labour	Edith Ann Martin	621	25.59	
Liberal Democrats	Tracie Anne Quinn-Robinson	117	4.82	
Majority		214		
Turnout		2,426		
Independent **gain** from Labour		Swing		

=== Calder Valley ward ===
Calder Valley ward
Party	Candidate	Votes	%	±%
Liberal Democrats	**Mary Seward**	1,406	51.10	
Labour	Jonathan Charles Timbers	912	33.15	
Green	Jamie Johnson	433	15.73	
Majority		494		
Turnout		2,751	30.24	
Liberal Democrats **gain** from Labour		Swing		

=== Elland ward ===
Elland ward
Party	Candidate	Votes	%	±%
Liberal Democrats	**Patricia May Allen**	1,106	56.92	
Conservative	Michael John Clarke	434	22.33	
Labour	Dawn Neal	403	20.74	
Majority		672		
Turnout		1,943	24.43	
Liberal Democrats **hold**		Swing		

=== Greetland and Stainland ward ===
Greetland and Stainland ward
Party	Candidate	Votes	%	±%
Liberal Democrats	**Keith Watson**	1,183	51.70	
Conservative	Keith Smith	813	35.53	
Labour	Matthew James Talbot	292	12.76	
Majority		370		
Turnout		2,288	24.41	
Liberal Democrats **hold**		Swing		

=== Hipperholme and Lightcliffe ward ===
Hipperholme and Lightcliffe ward
Party	Candidate	Votes	%	±%
Conservative	**David Eric Kirton**	1,711	73.08	
Labour	Merlin Alexander Kalanovic	630	26.91	
Majority		1,081		
Turnout		2,341	29.8	
Conservative **gain** from Labour		Swing		

=== Illingworth ward ===
Illingworth ward
Party	Candidate	Votes	%	±%
Conservative	**Geoffrey James Wallace**	805	53.38	
Labour	Jack Oade	490	32.49	
Liberal Democrats	Eira Rutley	213	14.12	
Majority		315		
Turnout		1,508	21.49	
Conservative **gain** from Labour		Swing		

=== Luddendenfoot ward ===
Luddendenfoot ward
Party	Candidate	Votes	%	±%
Liberal Democrats	**Peter Sephton Coles**	1,272	53.82	
Conservative	Charmain Vivienne Smith	556	23.52	
Labour	Elizabeth Jill Smith	535	22.64	
Majority		716		
Turnout		2,363	27.57	
Liberal Democrats **hold**		Swing		

=== Mixenden ward ===
Mixenden ward
Party	Candidate	Votes	%	±%
Conservative	**Lorraine Mary Stott**	658	44.79	
Labour	Freda Mary Davis	395	26.88	
Independent Labour	Redmond Mellett	293	19.94	
Liberal Democrats	Andrew John Foster	82	5.58	
Independent	Sean Vincent Loftus	41	2.79	
Majority		263		
Turnout		1,469	20.45	
Conservative **gain** from Independent Labour		Swing		

=== Northowram and Shelf ward ===
Northowram and Shelf ward
Party	Candidate	Votes	%	±%
Conservative	**Graham Edward Alexander Reason**	1,877	73.32	
Labour	Derek Fox Haviour	683	26.67	
Majority		1,194		
Turnout		2,560	29.47	
Conservative **hold**		Swing		

=== Ovenden ward ===
Ovenden ward
Party	Candidate	Votes	%	±%
Labour	**Bryan Thomas Raymond Smith**	522	41.19	
Conservative	Sally Victoria McCartney	412	32.51	
Liberal Democrats	John Durkin	333	26.28	
Majority		110		
Turnout		1,267	17.44	
Labour **hold**		Swing		

=== Rastrick ward ===
Rastrick ward
Party	Candidate	Votes	%	±%
Conservative	**Anne McAllister**	1,379	64.46	
Labour Co-op	George Edward Richardson	760	35.53	
Majority		619		
Turnout		2,139	26.55	
Conservative **gain** from Labour		Swing		

=== Ryburn ward ===
Ryburn ward
Party	Candidate	Votes	%	±%
Conservative	**David Rouse Lang**	1,220	47.54	
Labour	Judith Mary Gannon	699	27.24	
Liberal Democrats	Margaret Elizabeth White	647	25.21	
Majority		521		
Turnout		2,566	28.14	
Conservative **gain** from Labour		Swing		

=== Skircoat ward ===
Skircoat ward
Party	Candidate	Votes	%	±%
Conservative	**John Frank Brearley Ford**	1,692	67.24	
Labour	Keith Lucas	411	16.33	
Liberal Democrats	Judith Madeleine Harrison	304	12.08	
Green	Howard Smith	109	4.33	
Majority		1,281		
Turnout		2,516	29.26	
Conservative **hold**		Swing		

=== Sowerby Bridge ward ===
Sowerby Bridge ward
Party	Candidate	Votes	%	±%
Conservative	**Howard Blagbrough**	1,075	49.58	
Labour	Paul Anthony Wyatt	752	34.68	
Liberal Democrats	Sheila Ann Ashton	341	15.72	
Majority		323		
Turnout		2,168	28.08	
Conservative **gain** from Labour		Swing		

=== St John's ward ===
St John's ward
Party	Candidate	Votes	%	±%
Conservative	**Chaudhary Mohammed Saghir**	1,222	44.42	
Labour	Michael Donald Higgins	1,102	40.05	
Independent	Barbara Lynne Peggs	427	15.52	
Majority		120		
Turnout		2,751	34.77	
Conservative **gain** from Labour		Swing		

=== Todmorden ward ===
Todmorden ward
Party	Candidate	Votes	%	±%
Liberal Democrats	**Olwen Jean Arlette Jennings**	1,042	48.33	
Labour	John Lindsay Oldham	635	29.45	
Conservative	Philip Norman Brown	393	18.22	
BNP	Christian Michael Jackson	86	3.98	
Majority		407		
Turnout		2,156	27.49	
Liberal Democrats **hold**		Swing		

=== Town ward ===
Town ward
Party	Candidate	Votes	%	±%
Conservative	**Janet Ellen Hardy**	1,249	52.28	
Labour	Daniel McIntyre	840	35.16	
Independent	Gwyneth Greenwood	300	12.55	
Majority		409		
Turnout		2,389	27.52	
Conservative **gain** from Labour		Swing		

=== Warley ward ===
Warley ward
Party	Candidate	Votes	%	±%
Conservative	**Martin Howard Peel**	1,488	57.47	
Labour	Richard Harvey Ward	806	31.13	
Liberal Democrats	Robert Andrew Pearson	295	11.39	
Majority		682		
Turnout		2,589	33.13	
Conservative **gain** from Labour		Swing		
