= 2000 Wolverhampton Metropolitan Borough Council election =

2000 UK local government election

The 2000 Wolverhampton Metropolitan Borough Council election for the City of Wolverhampton Council were held on 4 May 2000.

The Labour Party retained control of the council, although Labour polled a lower percentage of votes (40.21%) than the Conservative Party (44.61%) in this election.

The composition of the council prior to the election was:

- Labour 40
- Conservative 17
- Liberal Democrat 3

The composition of the council following the election was:

- Labour 33
- Conservative 24
- Liberal Democrat 3

== Ward results ==
Bilston East
Party	Candidate	Votes	%	±%
Labour	Louise Miles	845	51.62	
Conservative	Brenda Wilson	557	34.03	
Liberal Democrats	Michael Birch	231	14.11	
Majority		288	17.59	
Turnout		1,637	20.29	

Bilston North
Party	Candidate	Votes	%	±%
Conservative	Gillian Fellows	1133	46.92	
Labour	Mark Stringer	1089	45.09	
Liberal Democrats	Frances Heap	189	7.83	
Majority		44	1.82	
Turnout		2,415	22.77	

Blakenhall
Party	Candidate	Votes	%	±%
Labour	Robert Jones	2072	70.86	
Conservative	John Corns	668	22.85	
Liberal Democrats	June Hemsley	172	5.88	
Majority		1404	48.02	
Turnout		2,924	33.11	

Bushbury
Party	Candidate	Votes	%	±%
Conservative	Susan Bem	1161	43.21	
Independent	Philip Turley	794	29.55	
Labour	Sher Dulai	583	21.70	
Liberal Democrats	Joan Stocking	148	5.51	
Majority		367	13.66	
Turnout		2,687	30.73	

East Park
Party	Candidate	Votes	%	±%
Labour	Patricia Byrne	1162	60.52	
Conservative	Alwyn Murray	561	29.22	
Liberal Democrats	Ann Whitehouse	192	10.00	
Majority		601	31.30	
Turnout		1,920	24.30	

Ettingshall
Party	Candidate	Votes	%	±%
Labour	Andrew Johnson	1033	59.64	
Conservative	Robert Green	464	26.79	
Liberal Democrats	Eileen Birch	228	13.16	
Majority		569	32.86	
Turnout		1,732	20.77	

Fallings Park
Party	Candidate	Votes	%	±%
Conservative	Sandra Terry	1115	46.34	
Labour	Michael Ewing	1064	44.22	
Liberal Democrats	Susan Butler	139	5.77	
Liberal	David Hallmark	86	3.57	
Majority		51	2.12	
Turnout		2,406	29.43	

Graiseley
Party	Candidate	Votes	%	±%
Labour	Elias Mattu	1816	50.81	
Conservative	David Jack	1460	40.86	
Liberal Democrats	Mary Millar	288	8.06	
Majority		356	9.97	
Turnout		3,574	39.23	

Heath Town
Party	Candidate	Votes	%	±%
Labour	Leslie Turner	767	43.02	
Liberal	Colin Hallmark	529	29.67	
Conservative	Rina Nayer	382	21.42	
Liberal Democrats	Ian Jenkins	102	5.72	
Majority		238	13.35	
Turnout		1,783	22.52	

Low Hill
Party	Candidate	Votes	%	±%
Labour	Paul Sweet	1064	68.07	
Conservative	Leon Tanski	493	31.54	
Majority		571	36.53	
Turnout		1,563	18.01	

Merry Hill
Party	Candidate	Votes	%	±%
Conservative	Christine Mills	2033	64.66	
Labour	Kevin Stelfox	762	24.24	
Liberal Democrats	William Beard	346	11.00	
Majority		1271	40.43	
Turnout		3,144	32.63	

Oxley
Party	Candidate	Votes	%	±%
Conservative	Ian Lucas	1211	45.98	
Labour	Paul Allen	1127	42.79	
Liberal Democrats	John Steatham	285	5.51	
Majority		84	3.19	
Turnout		2,634	27.65	

Park
Party	Candidate	Votes	%	±%
Conservative	Lucinda Turner	1885	50.60	
Labour	Philip Page	1338	35.92	
Liberal Democrats	Brian Lewis	274	7.36	
Green	David Hawkins	220	5.91	
Majority		547	14.69	
Turnout		3,725	36.04	

Penn
Party	Candidate	Votes	%	±%
Conservative	Alan Hart	2345	60.47	
Labour	Barry Thomas	1168	30.12	
Liberal Democrats	Jessica Pringle	261	6.73	
Green	Rachel Shanks	101	2.60	
Majority		1177	30.35	
Turnout		3,878	38.67	

St. Peter's
Party	Candidate	Votes	%	±%
Labour	Surjan Duhra	1506	57.88	
Liberal Democrats	Paul Hodson	596	22.91	
Conservative	Christopher Kelly	492	18.91	
Majority		910	34.97	
Turnout		2,602	26.53	

Spring Vale
Party	Candidate	Votes	%	±%
Liberal Democrats	Richard Whitehouse	2038	63.14	
Labour	Graham Childs	841	26.05	
Conservative	Christopher Haynes	348	10.78	
Majority		1197	37.08	
Turnout		3,228	32.27	

Tettenhall Regis
Party	Candidate	Votes	%	±%
Conservative	Barry Findlay	2029	69.53	
Labour	David Allcock	534	18.30	
Liberal Democrats	Roger Gray	351	12.03	
Majority		1495	51.23	
Turnout		2,918	31.64	

Tettenhall Wightwick
Party	Candidate	Votes	%	±%
Conservative	Andrew Wynne	2544	75.47	
Labour	Caroline Siarkiewicz	563	16.70	
Liberal Democrats	Philip Bennett	263	7.80	
Majority		1981	58.77	
Turnout		3,371	37.02	

Wednesfield North
Party	Candidate	Votes	%	±%
Conservative	Matthew Holdcroft	1272	49.92	
Labour	Michael Stafford Good	1031	40.46	
Liberal Democrats	Carole Jenkins	242	9.50	
Majority		241	9.46	
Turnout		2,548	28.39	

Wednesfield South
Party	Candidate	Votes	%	±%
Conservative	Simon Jevon	1587	60.41	
Labour	Susan Hall	1032	39.28	
Majority		555	21.13	
Turnout		2,267	30.00	
