= 2000 Chorley Borough Council election =

2000 UK local government election

Elections to Chorley Borough Council were held on 4 May 2000. One third of the council was up for election and the Labour party lost overall control of the council to no overall control.

After the election, the composition of the council was:

Party	Seats	±
Labour	24	▼7
Conservative	15	▲6
Liberal Democrat	7	▲1
Independent	2	Steady

== Election result ==
Chorley local election result 2000
Party	Seats	Gains	Losses	Net gain/loss	Seats %	Votes %	Votes	+/−
Conservative	7			▲6	43.75			
Labour	6			▼7	37.50			
Liberal Democrats	2			▲1	12.50			
Independent	1			Steady	6.25			
