= 2000 South Tyneside Metropolitan Borough Council election =

Local election in England

The 2000 South Tyneside Council Metropolitan Borough election took place on 4 May 2000 to elect members of South Tyneside Metropolitan Borough Council in Tyne and Wear, England. One third of the council was up for election and the Labour Party kept overall control of the council.

After the election, the composition of the council was:

- Labour 50
- Liberal Democrat 6
- Others 4

== Election result ==
Labour maintained their control of the council with only one independent gain being made in the election.

South Tyneside local election result 2000
Party	Seats	Gains	Losses	Net gain/loss	Seats %	Votes %	Votes	+/−
Labour	16			-1	80.0			
Liberal Democrats	2			0	10.0			
Others	2			+1	10.0			
