= 2000 Purbeck District Council election =

2000 UK local government election

Elections to Purbeck District Council were held on 4 May 2000. One third of the council was up for election and the Conservative Party stayed in overall control of the council.

After the election, the composition of the council was

- Conservative 17
- Independent 4
- Liberal Democrat 3

== Election result ==
Purbeck local election result 2000
Party	Seats	Gains	Losses	Net gain/loss	Seats %	Votes %	Votes	+/−
Conservative	7			+4	87.5			
Liberal Democrats	1			-2	12.5			
Independent	0			-1	0			
Labour	0			-1	0			
