= 2000 Three Rivers District Council election =

2000 UK local government election

Elections to Three Rivers Council in Hertfordshire, England, were held on 4 May 2000. One third of the council was up for election and the Liberal Democrat party stayed in overall control of the council.

After the election, the composition of the council was:

- Liberal Democrat 26
- Conservative 15
- Labour 7

== Election result ==
Three Rivers local election result 2000
Party	Seats	Gains	Losses	Net gain/loss	Seats %	Votes %	Votes	+/−
Liberal Democrats	8			0	47.1			
Conservative	6			0	35.3			
Labour	3			0	17.6			
