= 2000 Harrogate Borough Council election =

2000 UK local government election

The 2000 Harrogate Council election took place on 4 May 2000 to elect members of Harrogate Borough Council in North Yorkshire, England. One third of the council was up for election and the Liberal Democrats stayed in overall control of the council.

After the election, the composition of the council was:

- Liberal Democrat 40
- Conservative 18
- Labour 1

== Campaign ==
19 of the 59 seats were contested in the election with the Liberal Democrats defending 14, the Conservatives 4 and Labour 1 seat. Close contests were expected in Killinghall and the 2 wards in Ripon, with the Liberal Democrats hoping to make gains despite criticism over the handling of the redevelopment of the area around a bus station.

== Election result ==
The results saw the Liberal Democrats remain in control of the council, despite the Conservative party gaining seats. The Liberal Democrats finished the election with 40 seats, with the seats held by the party including the two in Ripon, which were narrowly won over the Conservatives. The Conservatives finished with 18 seats, while Labour was reduced to only one seat after losing a seat.

Harrogate local election result 2000
Party	Seats	Gains	Losses	Net gain/loss	Seats %	Votes %	Votes	+/−
Liberal Democrats	12			-2	63.2	44.1	12,241	-6.4%
Conservative	7			+3	36.8	46.7	12,969	+7.7%
Labour	0			-1	0	9.1	2,535	-1.3%

== Ward results ==
Almscliffe
Party	Candidate	Votes	%	±%
Conservative	Ian Galloway	707	81.4	
Liberal Democrats	Gillian Ford	123	14.2	
Labour	Deborah Havercroft	39	4.5	
Majority		584	67.2	
Turnout		869	41.4	

Bilton
Party	Candidate	Votes	%	±%
Liberal Democrats	Andrew Goss	669	39.4	
Conservative	Heather Adderley	571	33.6	
Labour	Peter Caunt	457	26.9	
Majority		98	5.8	
Turnout		1,697	29.8	+2.0

Claro
Party	Candidate	Votes	%	±%
Conservative	William Brewis	614	76.3	
Liberal Democrats	Helen Lyon	146	18.1	
Labour	Harold Ede	45	5.6	
Majority		468	58.1	
Turnout		805	39.7	

Duchy
Party	Candidate	Votes	%	±%
Liberal Democrats	James Clarke	955	57.3	+0.9
Conservative	Brian Coucher	627	37.6	+0.9
Labour	Roger Newby	84	5.0	−1.8
Majority		328	19.7	0.0
Turnout		1,666	25.1	−2.0

East Central
Party	Candidate	Votes	%	±%
Liberal Democrats	David Jacobs	687	53.8	−8.0
Conservative	William Hartmann	442	34.6	+10.6
Labour	Simon Hutchings	149	11.7	−2.5
Majority		245	19.2	−18.6
Turnout		1,278	25.5	−0.9

Granby
Party	Candidate	Votes	%	±%
Liberal Democrats	Diane Stokes	767	62.1	−8.3
Conservative	James Wood-Mitchell	349	28.2	+12.1
Labour	David King	120	9.7	−3.8
Majority		418	33.8	−20.6
Turnout		1,236	23.1	−0.4

Harlow
Party	Candidate	Votes	%	±%
Conservative	James Clark	1,450	58.0	+3.5
Liberal Democrats	Michael Stallard	951	38.0	−2.9
Labour	Harry Sutcliffe	101	4.0	−0.6
Majority		499	19.9	+6.3
Turnout		2,502	40.7	+0.2

Killinghall
Party	Candidate	Votes	%	±%
Conservative	Michael Bury	776	69.7	
Liberal Democrats	Christopher Ryan	274	24.6	
Labour	Malcolm Hayton	64	5.7	
Majority		502	45.1	
Turnout		1,114	33.6	

Knaresborough East
Party	Candidate	Votes	%	±%
Liberal Democrats	David Goode	959	45.9	+2.9
Conservative	John Smith	851	40.7	+2.8
Labour	Alan Beatham	279	13.4	−5.7
Majority		108	5.2	0.0
Turnout		2,089	35.2	+1.9

Knaresborough West
Party	Candidate	Votes	%	±%
Liberal Democrats	Kevin Hawkins	734	40.8	−3.6
Conservative	Malcolm Jackson	587	32.6	+8.1
Labour	Althea Farmer	477	26.5	−4.6
Majority		147	8.2	−5.1
Turnout		1,798	31.1	−3.8

Lower Nidderdale
Party	Candidate	Votes	%	±%
Liberal Democrats	Thomas Watson	519	57.7	
Conservative	Jacqueline Hughes	370	41.2	
Labour	Colin Gurkin	10	1.1	
Majority		149	16.6	
Turnout		899	48.2	

Nether Poppleton
Party	Candidate	Votes	%	±%
Conservative	Geoffrey Fenwicke-Clennell	214	62.2	
Liberal Democrats	Donald Prosser-Higdon	109	31.7	
Labour	Norman Dobell	21	6.1	
Majority		105	30.5	
Turnout		344	49.9	

New Park
Party	Candidate	Votes	%	±%
Liberal Democrats	Wendy Richards	463	63.3	−8.9
Conservative	Robin Adderley	228	31.2	+14.8
Labour	Bryan Robinson	40	5.5	−5.9
Majority		235	32.1	−23.8
Turnout		731	24.4	+2.8

Pannal
Party	Candidate	Votes	%	±%
Conservative	Clifford Trotter	1,550	60.5	+4.0
Liberal Democrats	Joan Newby	952	37.2	−3.3
Labour	Cynthia Coltman	59	2.3	−0.7
Majority		598	23.4	+7.4
Turnout		2,561	50.4	−2.0

Ripon East
Party	Candidate	Votes	%	±%
Liberal Democrats	Stuart Martin	571	49.8	−6.4
Conservative	David Briscombe	468	40.8	−3.0
Labour	Jonathan Lewis	108	9.4	+9.4
Majority		103	9.0	−3.3
Turnout		1,147	20.0	−4.8

Ripon West
Party	Candidate	Votes	%	±%
Liberal Democrats	Stephen Jones	672	50.3	−16.4
Conservative	Paul Richardson	592	44.3	+11.0
Labour	Patricia Foxall	72	5.4	+5.4
Majority		80	6.0	−27.4
Turnout		1,336	23.8	−4.4

Starbeck
Party	Candidate	Votes	%	±%
Liberal Democrats	Granville Ward	792	63.5	−8.4
Conservative	Philip Dixon	328	26.3	+10.0
Labour	Geoffrey Foxall	127	10.2	−1.6
Majority		464	37.2	−18.4
Turnout		1,247	24.0	−0.9

Wedderburn
Party	Candidate	Votes	%	±%
Liberal Democrats	Claire Kelley	1,207	49.2	+0.2
Conservative	Nigel Middlemass	1,156	47.1	+1.6
Labour	Robert Swithinbank	89	3.6	−1.9
Majority		51	2.1	−1.4
Turnout		2,452	40.6	+4.8

West Central
Party	Candidate	Votes	%	±%
Conservative	Jean Butterfield	1,089	55.2	+4.5
Liberal Democrats	Timothy Hurren	691	35.0	−6.3
Labour	Christine Colman	194	9.8	+2.8
Majority		398	20.2	+9.8
Turnout		1,974	33.9	+4.6
