= 2000 Rochdale Metropolitan Borough Council election =

2000 UK local government election

Elections to Rochdale Council were held on 4 May 2000. One third of the council was up for election and the Labour Party kept overall control of the council.

After the election, the composition of the council was:

- Labour 31
- Liberal Democrat 21
- Conservative 8

== Election result ==
Rochdale local election result 2000
| Party | Seats | Gains | Losses | Net gain/loss | Seats % | Votes % | Votes | +/− |
|---|---|---|---|---|---|---|---|---|
| Labour | 9 | | | -4 | 45.0 | | | |
| Liberal Democrats | 7 | | | +2 | 35.0 | | | |
| Conservative | 4 | | | +2 | 20.0 | | | |
