= Woking Borough Council elections =

Local government elections in Surrey, England

One third of Woking Borough Council in Surrey, England was elected each year, followed by one year without election. Since the last boundary changes in 2016, 30 councillors have been elected from 10 wards. The council is due to be abolished on 1 April 2027 following structural changes to local government in Surrey.

== Political control ==
A borough called Woking had existed since 1974 and was controlled by the Conservative Party until the local elections in 1986. The partisan control of the borough has been as follows, with each poll electing one third of the seats, except where noted.

Composition of the council
Year	Conservative	Labour	Liberal Democrats (Note: Includes totals for the predecessors of the Liberal Democrats, the Liberal Party and SDP (both of which participated in the Alliance).)	Independents & Others	Council control after election
Local government reorganisation; council established (32 seats)
1973	19	12	1	0	Conservative
New ward boundaries (35 seats)
1976	27	8	0	0	Conservative
1978	27	8	0	0	Conservative
1979	27	8	0	0	Conservative
1980	25	9	1	0	Conservative
1982	24	7	4	0	Conservative
1983	21	8	6	0	Conservative
1984	20	7	8	0	Conservative
1986	15	8	12	0	No overall control
1987	15	7	13	0	No overall control
1988	15	6	14	0	No overall control
1990	16	6	13	0	No overall control
1991	15	5	14	1	No overall control
1992	19	5	11	0	Conservative
1994	17	5	13	0	No overall control
1995	13	7	14	1	No overall control
1996	10	7	18	0	Liberal Democrats
1998	11	7	16	1	No overall control
1999	12	7	14	2 (Note: Including 1 vacant seat)	No overall control
New ward boundaries (36 seats)
2000	14	5	16	1	No overall control
2002	17	5	13	1	No overall control
2003	17	6	12	1	No overall control
2004	17	4	15	0	No overall control
2006	15	3	18	0	No overall control
2007	19	0	17	0	Conservative
2008	19	0	17	0	Conservative
2010	18	0	17	1	No overall control
2011	20	0	16	0	Conservative
2012	21	0	15	0	Conservative
2014	23	1	11	1	Conservative
2015	24	2	9	1	Conservative
New ward boundaries (30 seats)
2016	17	3	7	3	Conservative
2018	16	3	8	3	Conservative
2019	14	3	10	3	No overall control
2021	13	3	12	2	No overall control
2022	8	3	16	3	Liberal Democrats
2023	4	3	20	3	Liberal Democrats
2024	0	1	24	5	Liberal Democrats

Election	Party in control	Contested	Refs
2024	Liberal Democrats	11 of 30	
2023	Liberal Democrats	10 of 30	
2022	Liberal Democrats	10 of 30	
2021	No overall control	10 of 30	
2019	No overall control	10 of 30	
2018	Conservative	10 of 30	
2016^{FW}	Conservative	30 of 30	
2015	Conservative	12 of 36	
2014	Conservative	12 of 36	
2012	Conservative	12 of 36	
2011	Conservative	13 of 36	
2010	No overall control	13 of 36	
2009*	No overall control	—	
2008	Conservative	12 of 36	
2007	Conservative	12 of 36	
2006	No overall control	13 of 36	
2004	No overall control	13 of 36	
2003	No overall control	13 of 36	
2002	No overall control	13 of 36	
2000^{FW}	No overall control	36 of 36	
1999	No overall control	12 of 35	
1998	No overall control	11 of 35	
1996	Liberal Democrats	12 of 35	
1995	No overall control	12 of 35	
1994	No overall control	11 of 35	
1992	Conservative	12 of 35	
1991	No overall control	12 of 35	
1990	No overall control	12 of 35	
1988	No overall control	15 of 35	
1987	No overall control	12 of 35	
1986^{B}	No overall control	12 of 35	
1984	Conservative	12 of 35	
1983	Conservative	13 of 35	
1982	Conservative	11 of 35	
1980	Conservative	12 of 35	
1979^{B}	Conservative	12 of 35	
1978	Conservative	12 of 35	
1976^{FW}	Conservative	35 of 35	
1973^{BF}	Conservative	34 of 34	
B: New borough boundaries F: Full borough election W: New ward boundaries *: Change in control without election

== Borough result maps ==
2000 results map

2002 results map

2003 results map

2004 results map

2006 results map

2007 results map

2008 results map

2010 results map

2011 results map

2012 results map

2014 results map

2015 results map

2016 results map

2018 results map

2019 results map

2021 results map

2022 results map

2023 results map

2024 results map

== By-election results ==
=== 1994-1998 ===
Byfleet By-Election 14 November 1996
Party	Candidate	Votes	%	±%
Liberal Democrats		927	60.6	
Conservative		318	20.8	
Labour		228	14.9	
UKIP		58	3.8	
Majority		609	39.8	
Turnout		1,531		
Liberal Democrats hold		Swing		

Byfleet By-Election 18 September 1997
Party	Candidate	Votes	%	±%
Liberal Democrats		626	52.2	+2.4
Conservative		357	29.8	+3.6
Labour		217	18.1	−5.9
Majority		269	22.4	
Turnout		1,200	21.0	
Liberal Democrats hold		Swing		

Knaphill By-Election 18 September 1997
Party	Candidate	Votes	%	±%
Independent		652	34.5	+34.5
Conservative		545	28.9	−9.0
Liberal Democrats		442	23.4	−16.9
Labour		249	13.2	−8.6
Majority		107	5.6	
Turnout		1,888	24.0	
Independent gain from Liberal Democrats		Swing		

=== 1998-2002 ===
St Johns By-Election 10 June 1999
Party	Candidate	Votes	%	±%
Conservative		1,426	56.3	−0.1
Liberal Democrats		942	37.2	+1.3
Labour		164	6.5	−1.3
Majority		484	19.1	
Turnout		2,532	39.9	
Conservative hold		Swing		

Byfleet By-Election 12 July 2001
Party	Candidate	Votes	%	±%
Conservative	Beryl Marlow	809	53.6	+15.6
Liberal Democrats	Anne Roberts	557	36.9	−14.8
Labour	Raymond Holroyde	144	9.5	−0.8
Majority		252	16.7	
Turnout		1,510	27.5	
Conservative gain from Liberal Democrats		Swing		

=== 2010-2014 ===
Maybury and Sheerwater By-Election 17 September 2013
Party	Candidate	Votes	%	±%
Conservative	Rashid Mohammed	1,057	44.1	+22.6
Labour	Stephen Tudhope	833	34.8	+1.2
UKIP	Neil Willetts	255	10.6	−0.2
Liberal Democrats	Norman Johns	252	10.5	−23.6
Majority		224	9.3	
Turnout		2,397		
Conservative gain from Liberal Democrats		Swing		

=== 2014-2018 ===
Goldsworth East By-Election 18 October 2015
Party	Candidate	Votes	%	±%
Liberal Democrats	James Sanderson	594	37.8	+13.9
Conservative	Sonia Elbaraka	562	35.8	−8.5
Labour	James Butcher	262	16.7	−4.6
UKIP	Tim Read	154	9.8	−0.7
Majority		32	2.0	
Turnout		1,572		
Liberal Democrats hold		Swing		

Goldsworth West By-Election 18 October 2015
Party	Candidate	Votes	%	±%
Conservative	Chitra Rana	367	40.0	+7.0
Liberal Democrats	Tina Liddington	349	38.0	+0.3
Labour	Robina Shaheen	105	11.4	+1.2
UKIP	Troy de Leon	97	10.6	−8.6
Majority		18	2.0	
Turnout		918		
Conservative gain from Liberal Democrats		Swing		

=== 2022-2026 ===
Hoe Valley By-Election 10 July 2025
Party	Candidate	Votes	%	±%
Liberal Democrats	Deborah Hughes	1,118	62.8	−6.9
Reform	Sean Flude	379	21.3	+21.3
Conservative	Robert Kwiatkowski	130	7.3	−8.6
Green	Paul Hoekstra	83	4.7	+4.7
Labour	Samar Chaudhary	69	3.9	−8.2
Majority		739	41.5	
Turnout		1,779		
Liberal Democrats hold		Swing		
