= 2010 Woking Borough Council election =

2010 UK local government election

Map of the results of the 2010 Woking council election. Liberal Democrats in yellow and Conservatives in blue. Wards in grey were not contested in 2010.

The 2010 Woking Council election took place on 6 May 2010, on the same day as the 2010 general election, to elect members of Woking Borough Council in Surrey, England. One third of the council was up for election and the council stayed under no overall control.

After the election, the composition of the council was:

- Conservative 18
- Liberal Democrat 17
- Independent 1

== Background ==
After the last election in 2008 the Conservatives held a majority on the council with 19 seats, compared to 17 for the Liberal Democrats. However, in July 2009 the Conservatives lost their majority after councillor Peter Ankers resigned from the Conservatives to sit as an independent.

13 of the 36 seats on the council were contested in the election with the leader of the council, Conservative John Kingsbury, among the councillors who were defending seats. Byfleet ward saw 2 seats being contested after Conservative councillor Simon Hutton resigned from the council earlier in the year.

== Election result ==
The results saw no party win a majority, with the Conservatives the largest party on 18 seats, the Liberal Democrats on 17 and 1 Independent. The Conservatives gained 1 seat in Mount Hermon East after Carl Thomson defeated Liberal Democrat councillor Norman Johns. However, the Liberal Democrats took another seat back after winning one of the two seats contested in Byfleet ward. Among the Conservatives to hold their seats was Mohammed Iqbal in Maybury and Sheerwater ward, who was therefore able to become the first Asian mayor of Woking. Overall turnout in the election was 69.73%.

The election also saw Jonathan Lord win the Woking parliamentary constituency with 26,551 votes, beating Liberal Democrat Rosie Sharpley into second place. The seat had previously been held by Humfrey Malins, who announced his intention to stand down in 2009.

Woking local election result 2010
Party	Seats	Gains	Losses	Net gain/loss	Seats %	Votes %	Votes	+/−
Liberal Democrats	7	1	1	0	53.8	42.6	18,287	-1.5%
Conservative	6	1	1	0	46.2	44.1	18,940	-2.6%
Labour	0	0	0	0	0	7.8	3,338	+3.2%
UKIP	0	0	0	0	0	5.5	2,361	+0.9%

== Ward results ==
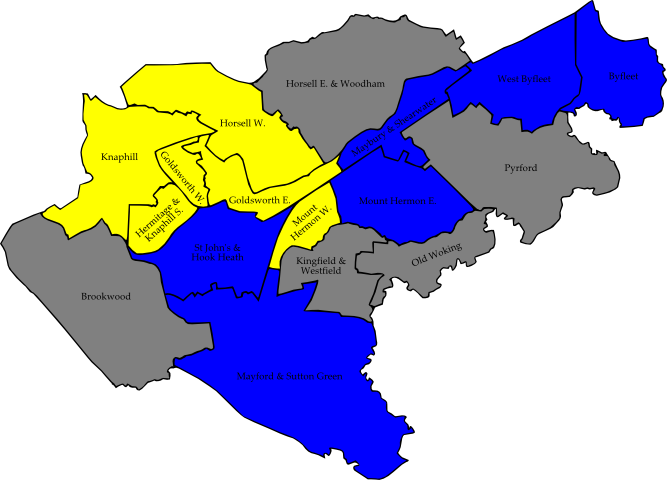
Map of the results of the 2010 Woking council election showing ward names. Coloured by party which finished top in each ward.

Byfleet (2)
Party	Candidate	Votes	%	±%
Conservative	Dorothy Farrant	1,657		
Liberal Democrats	Barnabas Shelbourne	1,655		
Conservative	Irene Watson Green	1,609		
Liberal Democrats	Richard Stennett	1,469		
UKIP	Richard Squire	364		
Labour	Celia Wand	310		
Labour	Michael Wood	289		
Turnout		7,353	69.5	+25.4
Conservative hold		Swing		
Liberal Democrats gain from Conservative		Swing		

Goldsworth East
Party	Candidate	Votes	%	±%
Liberal Democrats	Bryan Cross	1,861	50.4	−8.0
Conservative	Hilary Addison	1,267	34.3	+4.0
Labour	Tom Crisp	373	10.1	+4.5
UKIP	Marcia Taylor	189	5.1	−0.7
Majority		594	16.1	−12.0
Turnout		3,690	66.3	+26.3
Liberal Democrats hold		Swing		

Goldsworth West
Party	Candidate	Votes	%	±%
Liberal Democrats	Denzil Coulson	1,271	51.6	−3.7
Conservative	Anthony Casey	850	34.5	+3.6
Labour	Paul Brown	220	8.9	−0.8
UKIP	Leo Dix	121	4.9	+0.7
Majority		421	17.1	−7.3
Turnout		2,462	64.5	+33.2
Liberal Democrats hold		Swing		

Hermitage and Knaphill South
Party	Candidate	Votes	%	±%
Liberal Democrats	Kenneth Howard	1,352	50.3	−13.9
Conservative	Valerian Hopkins	896	33.3	+11.6
UKIP	Duncan Clarke	248	9.2	+2.1
Labour	Chancal Kapoor	192	7.1	+0.1
Majority		456	17.0	−25.5
Turnout		2,688	67.2	+30.9
Liberal Democrats hold		Swing		

Horsell West
Party	Candidate	Votes	%	±%
Liberal Democrats	Ann-Marie Barker	1,852	45.0	+0.7
Conservative	Simon Ashall	1,805	43.8	−4.2
UKIP	Timothy Shaw	245	5.9	+1.4
Labour	Colin Bright	217	5.3	+2.1
Majority		47	1.2	
Turnout		4,119	76.7	+27.4
Liberal Democrats hold		Swing		

Knaphill
Party	Candidate	Votes	%	±%
Liberal Democrats	Richard Sharp	2,128	42.9	−6.9
Conservative	Alexander Callaby	2,107	42.5	−2.9
Labour	Richard Ford	394	7.9	+7.9
UKIP	Matthew Davies	332	6.7	+2.0
Majority		21	0.4	−4.0
Turnout		4,961	69.5	+30.0
Liberal Democrats hold		Swing		

Maybury and Sheerwater
Party	Candidate	Votes	%	±%
Conservative	Iqbal Mohammed	2,034	43.0	+8.0
Liberal Democrats	Jamil Shabbana	1,871	39.5	−9.6
Labour	Stephen Tudhope	525	11.1	−0.4
UKIP	Pamela Wellstead	305	6.4	+2.0
Majority		163	3.5	
Turnout		4,735	66.4	+17.8
Conservative hold		Swing		

Mayford and Sutton Green
Party	Candidate	Votes	%	±%
Conservative	Simon Bellord	840	54.5	−16.5
Liberal Democrats	William Forster-Warner	606	39.4	+19.3
UKIP	David Roe	49	3.2	−1.5
Labour	Linda Kendall	45	2.9	−1.3
Majority		234	15.2	−35.7
Turnout		1,540	81.2	+30.8
Conservative hold		Swing		

Mount Hermon East
Party	Candidate	Votes	%	±%
Conservative	Carl Thomson	1,291	48.1	−6.2
Liberal Democrats	Norman Johns	1,175	43.8	+1.4
Labour	Sabir Hussain	149	5.6	+5.6
UKIP	Judith Squire	67	2.5	−0.7
Majority		116	4.3	−7.6
Turnout		2,682	70.8	+23.4
Conservative gain from Liberal Democrats		Swing		

Mount Hermon West
Party	Candidate	Votes	%	±%
Liberal Democrats	Liam Lyons	1,409	48.7	−12.3
Conservative	Alexander Celesius	1,114	38.5	+2.6
Labour	Elizabeth Evans	254	8.8	+8.8
UKIP	Mary Kingston	118	4.1	+1.1
Majority		295	10.2	−14.9
Turnout		2,895	64.7	+26.8
Liberal Democrats hold		Swing		

St Johns and Hook Heath
Party	Candidate	Votes	%	±%
Conservative	John Kingsbury	1,590	60.0	−12.6
Liberal Democrats	Diana Landon	743	28.0	+5.3
UKIP	Marion Free	159	6.0	+1.3
Labour	John Scott-Morgan	158	6.0	+6.0
Majority		847	32.0	−17.9
Turnout		2,650	74.6	+33.4
Conservative hold		Swing		

West Byfleet
Party	Candidate	Votes	%	±%
Conservative	Gary Elson	1,880	59.7	−13.7
Liberal Democrats	Toby Matthews	895	28.4	+6.7
Labour	Audrey Worgan	212	6.7	+6.7
UKIP	Robin Milner	164	5.2	+0.4
Majority		985	31.3	−20.4
Turnout		3,151	74.2	+35.0
Conservative hold		Swing		
