= 2004 Woking Borough Council election =

2004 UK local government election

Map of the results of the 2004 Woking council election. Liberal Democrats in yellow and Conservatives in blue. Wards in grey were not contested in 2004.

The 2004 Woking Council election took place on 10 June 2004 to elect members of Woking Borough Council in Surrey, England. One third of the council was up for election and the council stayed under no overall control.

After the election, the composition of the council was:

- Conservative 17
- Liberal Democrat 15
- Labour 4

== Election result ==
The results saw no party win a majority on the council with the Conservatives remaining the largest party on 17 seats. They gained 2 seats in Knaphill and Maybury and Sheerwater wards from an independent and Labour respectively, but also lost 2 seats to the Liberal Democrats in Byfleet and Horsell West. The Liberal Democrats were the most happy after gaining 3 seats to hold 15, which was their best election for the council in nearly 20 years. Labour suffered a collapse in support losing both of the seats which they were defending in Maybury and Sheerwater and Kingfield and Westfield, leaving them with only 4 seats on the council but still holding the balance of power.

Overall 7 sitting councillors were re-elected, 2 were defeated and 6 new people were elected. Turnout in the election was 41%, a rise from the 2003 election with the biggest increase in Maybury and Sheerwater where it nearly doubled to just under 44%.

Following the election the Conservatives remained in control of the executive with Jim Armitage continuing as leader of the council. Meanwhile, the Liberal Democrats took the leadership of all 3 Overview and Scrutiny Committees.

Woking local election result 2004
Party	Seats	Gains	Losses	Net gain/loss	Seats %	Votes %	Votes	+/−
Liberal Democrats	8	3	0	+3	61.5	39.6	9,520	+4.2%
Conservative	5	2	2	0	38.5	40.8	9,818	-5.9%
Labour	0	0	2	-2	0	10.2	2,462	-2.9%
UKIP	0	0	0	0	0	6.8	1,631	+4.9%
Independent	0	0	1	-1	0	1.6	378	-0.9%
Health and Community Issues Party	0	0	0	0	0	0.9	218	+0.9%
Green	0	0	0	0	0	0.1	35	-0.3%

== Ward results ==
Brookwood
Party	Candidate	Votes	%	±%
Liberal Democrats	Philip Goldenberg	509	49.3	+5.2
Conservative	Justin Boorman	467	45.3	+2.1
Green	Sandra Simkin	35	3.4	−6.0
Labour	Eric Kennedy	21	2.0	−1.3
Majority		42	4.0	+3.1
Turnout		1,032	54.5	+10.7
Liberal Democrats hold		Swing		

Byfleet
Party	Candidate	Votes	%	±%
Liberal Democrats	Anne Roberts	918	38.0	−6.8
Conservative	Beryl Marlow	853	35.4	−10.6
Independent	Suzanne Kittelsen	378	15.7	+15.7
UKIP	Francis Squire	172	7.1	+7.1
Labour	Brian Cozens	92	3.8	−5.5
Majority		65	2.6	
Turnout		2,413	43.3	+2.3
Liberal Democrats gain from Conservative		Swing		

Goldsworth East (2)
Party	Candidate	Votes	%	±%
Liberal Democrats	Rosie Sharpley	1,122		
Liberal Democrats	Robert Leach	966		
Conservative	Gary Carey	500		
Conservative	Bernard Wright	358		
Labour	Christopher Martin	196		
UKIP	Judith Squire	194		
Labour	Celia Wand	135		
Health and Community Issues Party	Michael Osman	68		
Turnout		3,539	33	
Liberal Democrats hold		Swing		
Liberal Democrats hold		Swing		

Goldsworth West
Party	Candidate	Votes	%	±%
Liberal Democrats	Ian Eastwood	561	52.2	−6.0
Conservative	Jeremy Yates	297	27.6	−4.3
UKIP	Marcia Taylor	122	11.3	+11.3
Labour	John Bramall	73	6.8	−3.2
Health and Community Issues Party	Shane Osman	22	2.0	+2.0
Majority		264	24.6	1.7
Turnout		1,075	28.0	+6.0
Liberal Democrats hold		Swing		

Horsell East and Woodham
Party	Candidate	Votes	%	±%
Conservative	Michael Smith	914	57.6	−1.1
Liberal Democrats	John Craig	380	24.0	+0.0
UKIP	Michael Harvey	207	13.1	−0.1
Labour	John Pitt	85	5.4	+1.4
Majority		534	33.6	−1.1
Turnout		1,586	46.1	+5.5
Conservative hold		Swing		

Horsell West
Party	Candidate	Votes	%	±%
Liberal Democrats	Ann-Marie Barker	1,090	42.7	+1.2
Conservative	Tony Branagan	1,078	42.2	−7.9
UKIP	Timothy Shaw	253	9.9	+6.8
Labour	Christopher Lowe	132	5.2	−0.2
Majority		12	0.5	
Turnout		2,553	47.4	+5.2
Liberal Democrats gain from Conservative		Swing		

Kingfield and Westfield
Party	Candidate	Votes	%	±%
Liberal Democrats	Derek McCrum	629	38.6	+19.8
Conservative	Colin Kemp	421	25.9	−2.2
Labour	David Mitchell	349	21.4	−22.1
UKIP	Dennis Davey	199	12.2	+2.6
Health and Community Issues Party	Caroline Schwark	30	1.8	+1.8
Majority		208	12.7	
Turnout		1,628	40.3	+11.5
Liberal Democrats gain from Labour		Swing		

Knaphill
Party	Candidate	Votes	%	±%
Conservative	Caroline Fisher	1,250	52.6	+6.1
Liberal Democrats	Bejan Shoraka	977	41.1	−6.7
Labour	Chanchal Kapoor	150	6.3	+0.6
Majority		273	11.5	
Turnout		2,377	34.5	+4.0
Conservative gain from Independent		Swing		

Maybury and Sheerwater
Party	Candidate	Votes	%	±%
Conservative	Riasat Khan	1,142	39.4	+19.5
Labour	Sabir Hussain	995	34.4	−6.4
Liberal Democrats	Colin Scott	661	22.8	−4.5
Health and Community Issues Party	Katrina Osman	98	3.4	−8.6
Majority		147	5.0	
Turnout		2,896	43.4	+21.2
Conservative gain from Labour		Swing		

Mount Hermon East
Party	Candidate	Votes	%	±%
Conservative	Valerie Tinney	809	56.4	−4.2
Liberal Democrats	David Everett	397	27.7	+0.3
UKIP	Richard Squire	136	9.5	+5.0
Labour	Michael Byrne	92	6.4	−1.1
Majority		412	28.7	−4.5
Turnout		1,434	39.7	+5.6
Conservative hold		Swing		

Mount Hermon West
Party	Candidate	Votes	%	±%
Liberal Democrats	Ian Johnson	840	54.1	+3.6
Conservative	Michele Maddock	485	31.3	−11.1
UKIP	Mark Kingston	151	9.7	+7.4
Labour	Vincenzo Congliaro	76	4.9	+0.1
Majority		355	22.8	+14.7
Turnout		1,552	40.3	−0.3
Liberal Democrats hold		Swing		

Pyrford
Party	Candidate	Votes	%	±%
Conservative	Ian Fidler	1,244	62.9	−9.4
Liberal Democrats	Andrew Grimshaw	470	23.8	−1.1
UKIP	Robin Milner	197	10.0	+10.0
Labour	Richard Cowley	66	3.3	+0.5
Majority		774	39.1	−8.3
Turnout		1,977	49.4	+4.5
Conservative hold		Swing		
