= 2008 Woking Borough Council election =

2008 UK local government election

Results of the 2008 Woking Borough Council election

The 2008 Woking Council election took place on 1 May 2008 to elect members of Woking Borough Council in Surrey, England. One third of the council was up for election and the Conservative Party stayed in overall control of the council.

After the election, the composition of the council was:

- Conservative 19
- Liberal Democrat 17

== Background ==
13 seats were contested in the election with 42 candidates from the Conservatives, Liberal Democrats, Labour and United Kingdom Independence Party (UKIP). Labour only put forward 6 candidates, while UKIP had candidates in every ward for the first time. Since the 2007 election the Conservatives had held a majority on the council after a long period with no party holding a majority.

== Election result ==
The results saw the Conservatives maintain their majority on the council with 19 seats compared to 17 for the Liberal Democrats. Seven new councillors were elected after five sitting councillors stood down and 2 Liberal Democrats lost in the election. The Conservatives gained seats from the Liberal Democrats in Brookwood and Horsell West, while the Liberal Democrats won seats back in Knaphill and Maybury and Sheerwater. Overall turnout in the election at 43.46%, was almost the same as the 43.6% seen in 2007.

Woking local election result 2008
Party	Seats	Gains	Losses	Net gain/loss	Seats %	Votes %	Votes	+/−
Liberal Democrats	7	2	2	0	53.8	44.1	11,230	+8.7%
Conservative	6	2	2	0	46.2	46.7	11,885	-4.2%
Labour	0	0	0	0	0	4.6	1,178	-4.1%
UKIP	0	0	0	0	0	4.6	1,160	+0.1%

== Ward results ==
Brookwood
Party	Candidate	Votes	%	±%
Conservative	Glynis Preshaw	488	48.7	+3.4
Liberal Democrats	Michael Peel	477	47.6	−1.7
UKIP	William March	19	1.9	+1.9
Labour	Richard Ford	19	1.9	−0.1
Majority		11	1.1	
Turnout		1,003	52.9	−1.6
Conservative gain from Liberal Democrats		Swing		

Byfleet
Party	Candidate	Votes	%	±%
Liberal Democrats	Anne Roberts	1,204	50.6	+7.6
Conservative	Simon Farrant	1,106	46.5	−10.5
UKIP	Richard Squire	68	2.9	+2.9
Majority		98	4.1	
Turnout		2,378	44.1	+0.1
Liberal Democrats hold		Swing		

Goldsworth East
Party	Candidate	Votes	%	±%
Liberal Democrats	Rosie Sharpley	1,261	58.4	+6.5
Conservative	David Roe	654	30.3	−7.1
UKIP	Robert Burberry	126	5.8	+2.5
Labour	John Scott-Morgan	120	5.6	−1.8
Majority		607	28.1	+13.6
Turnout		2,161	40.0	−0.9
Liberal Democrats hold		Swing		

Goldsworth West
Party	Candidate	Votes	%	±%
Liberal Democrats	Ian Eastwood	661	55.3	−8.9
Conservative	Anthony Casey	369	30.9	+1.7
Labour	Paul Brown	116	9.7	+3.1
UKIP	Leo Dix	50	4.2	+4.2
Majority		292	24.4	−10.6
Turnout		1,196	31.3	−1.6
Liberal Democrats hold		Swing		

Horsell East and Woodham
Party	Candidate	Votes	%	±%
Conservative	Michael Smith	1,100	70.3	−0.8
Liberal Democrats	John Doran	334	21.4	+3.0
UKIP	Marion Free	130	8.3	+1.8
Majority		766	48.9	−3.8
Turnout		1,564	44.5	−3.4
Conservative hold		Swing		

Horsell West
Party	Candidate	Votes	%	±%
Conservative	Anthony Branagan	1,249	48.0	−2.7
Liberal Democrats	Ann-Marie Barker	1,153	44.3	+4.5
UKIP	Timothy Shaw	117	4.5	+0.3
Labour	Audrey Worgan	82	3.2	−0.4
Majority		96	3.7	−7.2
Turnout		2,601	49.3	−2.5
Conservative gain from Liberal Democrats		Swing		

Kingfield and Westfield
Party	Candidate	Votes	%	±%
Liberal Democrats	Derek McCrum	699	39.4	+7.5
Conservative	Carl Thomson	509	28.7	−7.7
Labour	John Martin	478	26.9	+1.7
UKIP	Dennis Davey	88	5.0	−1.4
Majority		190	10.7	
Turnout		1,774	44.9	+1.9
Liberal Democrats hold		Swing		

Knaphill
Party	Candidate	Votes	%	±%
Liberal Democrats	Oliver Wells	1,380	49.8	+7.3
Conservative	Beryl Dunham	1,258	45.4	+1.1
UKIP	Duncan Clarke	131	4.7	−3.1
Majority		122	4.4	
Turnout		2,769	39.5	+2.3
Liberal Democrats gain from Conservative		Swing		

Maybury and Sheerwater
Party	Candidate	Votes	%	±%
Liberal Democrats	Mohammed Bashir	1,551	49.1	+14.9
Conservative	Rashid Mohammed	1,104	35.0	−3.8
Labour	Nicholas Trier	363	11.5	−10.4
UKIP	Marcia Taylor	139	4.4	+1.4
Majority		447	14.1	
Turnout		3,157	48.6	+2.8
Liberal Democrats gain from Conservative		Swing		

Mount Hermon East
Party	Candidate	Votes	%	±%
Conservative	David Bittleston	942	54.3	+10.1
Liberal Democrats	Philip Goldenberg	736	42.4	−6.0
UKIP	Judith Squire	56	3.2	−0.7
Majority		206	11.9	
Turnout		1,734	47.4	−1.3
Conservative hold		Swing		

Mount Hermon West
Party	Candidate	Votes	%	±%
Liberal Democrats	Ian Johnson	965	61.0	+4.3
Conservative	Valerian Hopkins	568	35.9	+0.7
UKIP	Mary Kingston	48	3.0	−1.5
Majority		397	25.1	+3.6
Turnout		1,581	37.9	−5.4
Liberal Democrats hold		Swing		

Pyrford
Party	Candidate	Votes	%	±%
Conservative	Ashley Bowes	1,379	70.5	−5.8
Liberal Democrats	Andrew Grimshaw	466	23.8	+6.2
UKIP	Robin Milner	112	5.7	−0.5
Majority		913	46.7	−12.0
Turnout		1,957	39.2	−12.2
Conservative hold		Swing		

West Byfleet
Party	Candidate	Votes	%	±%
Conservative	Gary Elson	1,159	73.4	−3.8
Liberal Democrats	Michael Wilson	343	21.7	+8.1
UKIP	Graham Wood	76	4.8	+0.7
Majority		816	51.7	−11.9
Turnout		1,578	39.2	−4.0
Conservative hold		Swing		
