= 2022 Woking Borough Council election =

Municipal election in England

← 2021	5 May 2022	2023 →

10 of 30 seats on Woking Borough Council 16 seats needed for a majority
	First party	Second party
Party	Liberal Democrats	Independent
Seats won	7	2
Seats after	16	3
Seat change	▲4	▲1
Popular vote	14,021	3,089
Percentage	47.3%	10.4%
	Third party	Fourth party
Party	Labour	Conservative
Seats won	1	0
Seats after	3	8
Seat change	Steady	▼5
Popular vote	1,794	9,108
Percentage	6.1%	30.8%
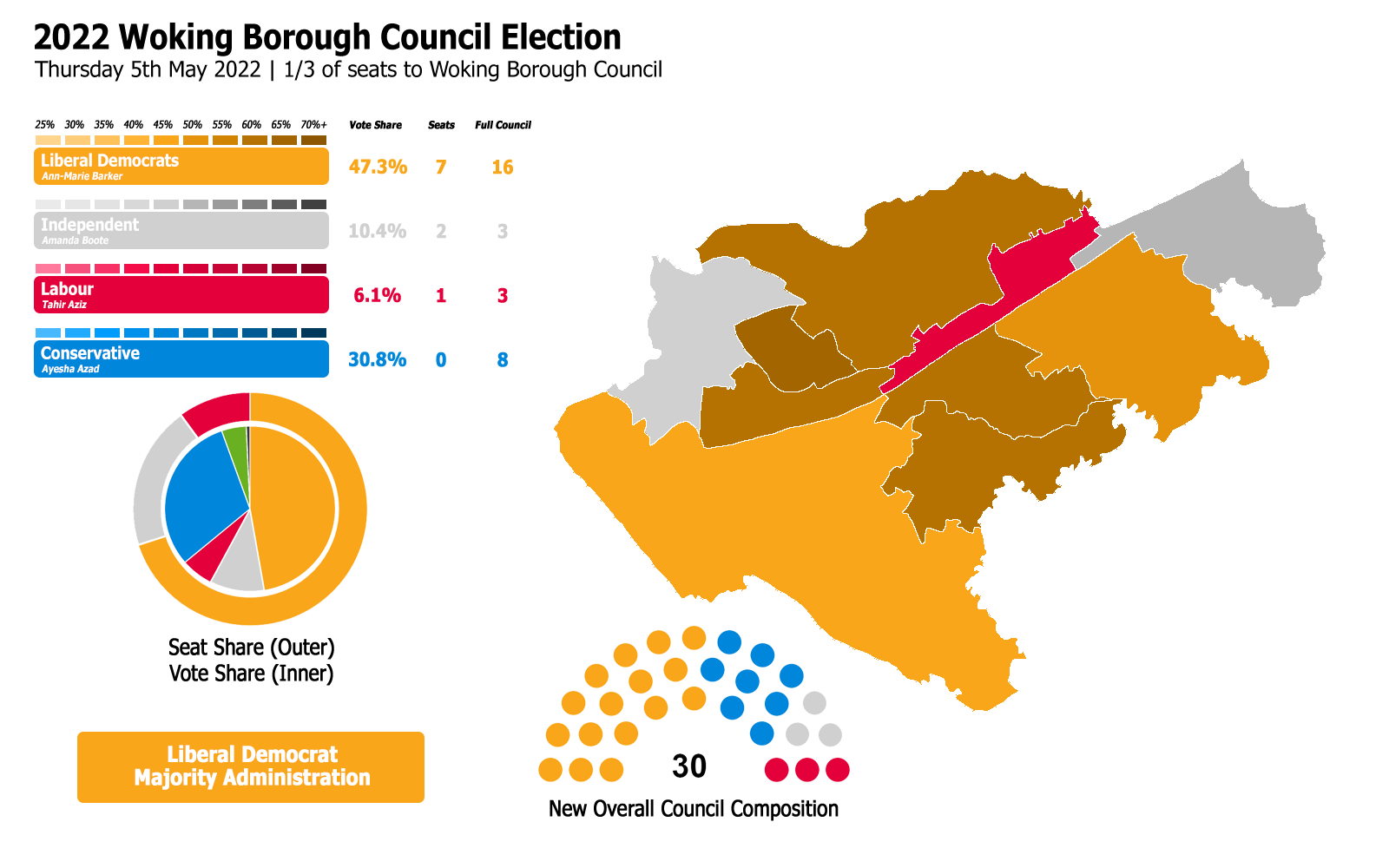
- Map showing the results of the 2022 Woking Borough Council election

The 2022 Woking Borough Council election took place on 5 May 2022 to elect one third of members to Woking Borough Council in England coinciding with other local elections held across much of England. In this election, the Liberal Democrats gained control of the council after gaining 4 seats from the Conservative Party. In the Overall Results and the individual Ward results charts below, the results of 2022 are compared to those of four years previously, in 2018. In 2018, the Conservatives had secured a relatively successful local election result in Woking, winning 5 out of the 10 seats and achieving 45.8% of the overall vote.

== Overall results ==
Woking Borough Council election, 2022
Party	This election			Full council			This election		
Party	Seats	Net	Seats %	Other	Total	Total %	Votes	Votes %	+/−
Liberal Democrats	7	▲4	70.0	9	16	53.3	14,021	47.3	▲18.1
Independent	2	▲1	20.0	1	3	10.0	3,089	10.4	▲4.2
Labour	1	Steady	10.0	2	3	10.0	1,794	6.1	▼10.0
Conservative	0	▼5	0.0	8	8	26.7	9,108	30.8	▼15.0
Green	0	Steady	0.0	0	0	0.0	1,404	4.7	New
Heritage	0	Steady	0.0	0	0	0.0	198	0.7	New

== Ward results ==
=== Byfleet and West Byfleet ===
Byfleet and West Byfleet
Party	Candidate	Votes	%	±%
Independent	Daryl Jordan	1,692	52.4	▲11.5
Conservative	Dan Siddiqi	840	26.0	▼13.1
Liberal Democrats	Chris Martin	694	21.5	▲9.3
Majority		852	26.4	N/A
Turnout		3,238	37.2	▲3.7
Independent hold		Swing		

=== Canalside ===
Canalside
Party	Candidate	Votes	%	±%
Labour	M. Ilyas Raja	1,310	48.4	▲3.4
Conservative	Ayyaz Mahmood	937	34.6	▲1.8
Liberal Democrats	Ilan Calyradja	462	17.1	▲4.6
Majority		373	13.8	▲1.6
Turnout		2,726	37.9	▲1.8
Labour hold		Swing		

=== Goldsworth Park ===
Goldsworth Park
Party	Candidate	Votes	%	±%
Liberal Democrats	Stephen Oades	1,641	66.4	▲28.8
Conservative	Chitra Rana	829	33.6	▼4.4
Majority		812	32.8	N/A
Turnout		2,497	36.7	▲1.5
Liberal Democrats gain from Conservative		Swing		

=== Heathlands ===
Heathlands
Party	Candidate	Votes	%	±%
Liberal Democrats	Guy Cosnahan	1,507	49.2	▲24.8
Conservative	Simon Ashall	1,088	35.5	▼26.7
Green	Jennifer Mason	409	13.4	New
Heritage	Judith Squire	58	1.9	New
Majority		419	13.7	N/A
Turnout		3,067	43.5	▲2.8
Liberal Democrats gain from Conservative		Swing		

=== Hoe Valley ===
Hoe Valley
Party	Candidate	Votes	%	±%
Liberal Democrats	Andy Caulfield	1,506	63.8	▲14.7
Conservative	Sonal Sher	484	20.5	▼12.6
Labour	Christopher Martin	221	9.4	▼4.6
Green	Ivica Petrikova	148	6.3	New
Majority		1,022	43.3	▲27.3
Turnout		2,365	33.3	▲1.5
Liberal Democrats hold		Swing		

=== Horsell ===
Horsell
Party	Candidate	Votes	%	±%
Liberal Democrats	John Morley	2,285	61.8	▲26.4
Conservative	Philip Gent	1,173	31.7	▼18.3
Green	Nigel Ridgeon	240	6.5	New
Majority		1,112	30.1	N/A
Turnout		3,717	52.1	▲6.7
Liberal Democrats gain from Conservative		Swing		

=== Knaphill ===
Knaphill
Party	Candidate	Votes	%	±%
Independent	Hassan Akberali	1,397	48.1	▲32.5
Conservative	Debbie Harlow	1,019	35.1	▼18.8
Liberal Democrats	Erica Singharay	489	16.8	▲1.5
Majority		378	13.0	N/A
Turnout		2,918	36.6	▲4.3
Independent gain from Conservative		Swing		

=== Mount Hermon ===
Mount Hermon
Party	Candidate	Votes	%	±%
Liberal Democrats	Liam Lyons	1,974	64.5	▲21.4
Conservative	Chan Keaney	782	25.6	▼16.9
Green	Jim Craig	250	8.2	New
Heritage	Richard Squire	53	1.7	New
Majority		1,192	38.9	▲38.3
Turnout		3,068	41.0	▼0.5
Liberal Democrats hold		Swing		

=== Pyrford ===
Pyrford
Party	Candidate	Votes	%	±%
Liberal Democrats	Peter Graves	1,743	53.2	▲31.8
Conservative	Mohammed Rashid	1,147	35.0	▼24.3
Labour	Raul Lai	263	8.0	▼6.4
Green	Anna Platoni	124	3.8	New
Majority		596	18.2	N/A
Turnout		3,296	43.9	▲1.0
Liberal Democrats gain from Conservative		Swing		

=== St Johns ===
St Johns
Party	Candidate	Votes	%	±%
Liberal Democrats	Tom Spenser	1,720	60.4	▲16.9
Conservative	Paul Smith	809	28.4	▼13.1
Green	Kate Kett	233	8.2	New
Heritage	Tim Read	87	3.1	New
Majority		911	32.0	▲30.0
Turnout		2,858	40.3	▲0.9
Liberal Democrats hold		Swing		
