= 2000 Woking Borough Council election =

2000 UK local government election

Map of the results of the 2000 Woking council election. Liberal Democrats in yellow, Conservatives in blue, Labour in red and independent in grey.

The 2000 Woking Council election took place on 4 May 2000 to elect members of Woking Borough Council in Surrey, England. The whole council was up for election with boundary changes since the last election in 1999 increasing the number of seats by one. The council stayed under no overall control, and overall turnout in the election was 34.32%.

== Election result ==
Woking local election result 2000
| Party | Seats | Gains | Losses | Net gain/loss | Seats % | Votes % | Votes | +/− |
|---|---|---|---|---|---|---|---|---|
| Liberal Democrats | 16 | | | +3 | 44.4 | 36.8 | 18,876 | |
| Conservative | 14 | | | +1 | 38.9 | 45.0 | 23,092 | |
| Labour | 5 | | | -2 | 13.9 | 15.8 | 8,008 | |
| Independent | 1 | | | -1 | 2.8 | 2.5 | 1,306 | |

== Ward results ==
Brookwood
| Party | Candidate | Votes | % | ±% |
|---|---|---|---|---|
| Conservative | Mark Pritchard | 390 | 62.9 | |
| Liberal Democrats | Deryck Fowler | 188 | 30.3 | |
| Labour | Linda Kendall | 42 | 6.8 | |
| Majority | | 202 | 32.6 | |
| Turnout | | 620 | | |

Byfleet (3)
| Party | Candidate | Votes | % | ±% |
|---|---|---|---|---|
| Liberal Democrats | Elsie Stranks | 1,011 | | |
| Liberal Democrats | Alfred Stranks | 992 | | |
| Liberal Democrats | Joan Mackintosh | 959 | | |
| Conservative | James Brady | 743 | | |
| Conservative | Daniel Todd | 736 | | |
| Conservative | Geoffrey Marlow | 717 | | |
| Labour | Raymond Holroyde | 201 | | |
| Labour | Brian Cozens | 165 | | |
| Labour | Michael Roberts | 161 | | |
| Turnout | | 5,685 | | |

Goldsworth East (3)
| Party | Candidate | Votes | % | ±% |
|---|---|---|---|---|
| Liberal Democrats | Rosie Sharpley | 897 | | |
| Liberal Democrats | Geoffrey Smith | 805 | | |
| Liberal Democrats | Bryan Cross | 803 | | |
| Conservative | Antony Mitchell | 587 | | |
| Conservative | Hilary Addison | 584 | | |
| Conservative | Simon Bellord | 556 | | |
| Labour | Richard Ford | 379 | | |
| Labour | Vincenzo Conigliaro | 378 | | |
| Labour | David Percey | 355 | | |
| Turnout | | 5,344 | | |

Goldsworth West (2)
| Party | Candidate | Votes | % | ±% |
|---|---|---|---|---|
| Liberal Democrats | Ian Eastwood | 523 | | |
| Liberal Democrats | Diana Landon | 484 | | |
| Conservative | Valerian Hopkins | 334 | | |
| Conservative | Sharon Lawrence | 324 | | |
| Labour | James Lewis | 107 | | |
| Labour | Celia Wand | 81 | | |
| Turnout | | 1,853 | | |

Hermitage and Knaphill South (2)
| Party | Candidate | Votes | % | ±% |
|---|---|---|---|---|
| Liberal Democrats | Fiona Williams | 727 | | |
| Liberal Democrats | Ken Howard | 718 | | |
| Conservative | Clive Howse | 506 | | |
| Conservative | Tariq Assi | 482 | | |
| Labour | Graeme Carman | 180 | | |
| Labour | Matthew Pollard | 180 | | |
| Turnout | | 2,793 | | |

Horsell East and Woodham (2)
| Party | Candidate | Votes | % | ±% |
|---|---|---|---|---|
| Conservative | Margaret Gammon | 859 | | |
| Conservative | Gordon Brown | 833 | | |
| Liberal Democrats | Ann-Marie Barker | 399 | | |
| Liberal Democrats | John Doran | 361 | | |
| Labour | Michael Long | 96 | | |
| Labour | David Mitchell | 64 | | |
| Turnout | | 2,642 | | |

Horsell West (3)
| Party | Candidate | Votes | % | ±% |
|---|---|---|---|---|
| Conservative | Tony Branagan | 1,060 | | |
| Conservative | Jim Armitage | 1,058 | | |
| Liberal Democrats | Richard Sanderson | 1,016 | | |
| Conservative | Noreen Golding | 1,013 | | |
| Liberal Democrats | Anthony Kremer | 943 | | |
| Liberal Democrats | Gareth Davies | 937 | | |
| Labour | Audrey Worgan | 160 | | |
| Labour | Geraldine Clayton | 139 | | |
| Labour | Colin Bright | 135 | | |
| Turnout | | 6,461 | | |

Kingfield and Westfield (2)
| Party | Candidate | Votes | % | ±% |
|---|---|---|---|---|
| Labour | John Pattison | 651 | | |
| Labour | John Martin | 560 | | |
| Conservative | Norma Gruselle | 394 | | |
| Conservative | Pauline Brown | 373 | | |
| Liberal Democrats | Ronald Strutt | 185 | | |
| Liberal Democrats | Louise Morales | 180 | | |
| Turnout | | 2,343 | | |

Knaphill (3)
| Party | Candidate | Votes | % | ±% |
|---|---|---|---|---|
| Independent | Michael Smith | 1,004 | | |
| Liberal Democrats | Neville Hinks | 762 | | |
| Liberal Democrats | Tony Hayes-Allen | 602 | | |
| Conservative | Christopher Jarvis | 547 | | |
| Conservative | Robin Harper | 534 | | |
| Conservative | Sidney Ball | 524 | | |
| Liberal Democrats | Perveen Baluch-Jenkins | 348 | | |
| Labour | George Dyball | 118 | | |
| Labour | Michael Eden | 116 | | |
| Labour | Janis Peppitt | 111 | | |
| Turnout | | 4,666 | | |

Maybury and Sheerwater (3)
| Party | Candidate | Votes | % | ±% |
|---|---|---|---|---|
| Labour | Mohammad Raja | 946 | | |
| Labour | Elizabeth Evans | 807 | | |
| Labour | Barry Pope | 788 | | |
| Conservative | Michael Gammon | 350 | | |
| Conservative | Christopher Vardy | 297 | | |
| Conservative | Michael Hopgood | 296 | | |
| Liberal Democrats | David Farrow | 247 | | |
| Liberal Democrats | Kevin Scott | 216 | | |
| Liberal Democrats | Ian Pitwell | 208 | | |
| Turnout | | 4,155 | | |

Mayford and Sutton Green
| Party | Candidate | Votes | % | ±% |
|---|---|---|---|---|
| Conservative | James Palmer | 615 | 75.5 | |
| Liberal Democrats | Sinclair Webster | 149 | 18.3 | |
| Labour | Susan Stocker | 51 | 6.3 | |
| Majority | | 466 | 57.2 | |
| Turnout | | 815 | | |

Mount Hermon East (2)
| Party | Candidate | Votes | % | ±% |
|---|---|---|---|---|
| Conservative | Valerie Tinney | 739 | | |
| Conservative | David Bittleston | 735 | | |
| Liberal Democrats | Peter Hough | 270 | | |
| Liberal Democrats | Enid McCrum | 268 | | |
| Labour | Michael Kelly | 107 | | |
| Labour | Ruth Callis | 102 | | |
| Turnout | | 2,221 | | |

Mount Hermon West (2)
| Party | Candidate | Votes | % | ±% |
|---|---|---|---|---|
| Liberal Democrats | Ian Johnson | 672 | | |
| Liberal Democrats | Hugh Shirley | 637 | | |
| Conservative | Beryl Marlow | 482 | | |
| Conservative | Allen Taylor | 477 | | |
| Labour | Catherine Green | 80 | | |
| Labour | Mark Townsend | 68 | | |
| Turnout | | 2,416 | | |

Old Woking
| Party | Candidate | Votes | % | ±% |
|---|---|---|---|---|
| Liberal Democrats | Rosemary Johnson | 303 | 52.9 | |
| Labour | Christopher Martin | 167 | 29.1 | |
| Conservative | Sandra Palmer | 103 | 18.0 | |
| Majority | | 136 | 23.8 | |
| Turnout | | 573 | | |

Pyrford (2)
| Party | Candidate | Votes | % | ±% |
|---|---|---|---|---|
| Conservative | Ian Fidler | 1,114 | | |
| Conservative | Peter Ankers | 1,111 | | |
| Liberal Democrats | Andrew Grimshaw | 558 | | |
| Liberal Democrats | Valerie Sargent | 479 | | |
| Labour | Richard Cowley | 74 | | |
| Labour | Suzanne Pope | 71 | | |
| Turnout | | 3,407 | | |

St Johns and Hook Heath (2)
| Party | Candidate | Votes | % | ±% |
|---|---|---|---|---|
| Conservative | Graham Cundy | 947 | | |
| Conservative | John Kingsbury | 871 | | |
| Liberal Democrats | Robert Leach | 257 | | |
| Liberal Democrats | Marian Elsden | 255 | | |
| Labour | John Bramall | 77 | | |
| Labour | Celia Dyball | 68 | | |
| Turnout | | 2,475 | | |

West Byfleet (2)
| Party | Candidate | Votes | % | ±% |
|---|---|---|---|---|
| Conservative | Mehala Gosling | 910 | | |
| Conservative | Michael Popham | 891 | | |
| Independent | Richard Wilson | 302 | | |
| Liberal Democrats | Ian Oxford | 266 | | |
| Liberal Democrats | Hasnain Bilgrami | 251 | | |
| Labour | Michael Bryne | 132 | | |
| Labour | Michael Barr | 91 | | |
| Turnout | | 2,843 | | |
