= 2006 Woking Borough Council election =

2006 UK local government election

Results of the 2006 Woking Borough Council election

The 2006 Woking Council election took place on 4 May 2006 to elect members of Woking Borough Council in Surrey, England. One third of the council was up for election and the council stayed under no overall control.

After the election, the composition of the council was:

- Liberal Democrat 18
- Conservative 15
- Labour 3

== Campaign ==
6 sitting councillors stood down at the election including the former Conservative leader of the council Jim Armitage and the independent Mike Copham who had resigned from the Conservatives.

Housing and development was a contentious issue during the campaign, with the council being required to build 240 houses a year for the next 20 years under the South East Plan. Both the Conservatives and Liberal Democrats fought the election on a platform of opposing overdevelopment and protecting the green belt.

The campaign saw allegations of electoral fraud in Woking, which were investigated by the police. These included claims of multiple voter registrations at 6 addresses in Maybury and Sheerwater, intimidation and that blank postal votes had been given community leaders. The investigation saw one man arrested on suspicion of impersonating another voter.

== Election result ==
The results saw the Liberal Democrats become the largest party on the council with 18 seats as compared to 15 for the Conservatives. The Conservatives failed to take any seats from the Liberal Democrats, who gained 3 seats in Horsell West, Knaphill and Mount Hermon East wards and almost won a majority on the council for the first time since 1998 after losing by just 2 votes in Byfleet after 4 recounts. Despite this the Conservatives took more votes across the council than the Liberal Democrats and made a gain from Labour in Maybury and Sheerwater. Labour was reduced to only 3 seats on the council after losing in Maybury and Sheerwater, which was the only ward where they won more than 200 votes. Overall turnout in the election was 42.17%.

Woking local election result 2006
Party	Seats	Gains	Losses	Net gain/loss	Seats %	Votes %	Votes	+/−
Liberal Democrats	8	3	0	+3	61.5	41.0	10,450	+1.4%
Conservative	5	2	3	-1	38.5	45.2	11,527	+4.4%
Labour	0	0	1	-1	0	8.1	2,063	-2.1%
UKIP	0	0	0	0	0	3.4	865	-3.4%
Independent	0	0	1	-1	0	1.5	384	-0.1%
UK Community Issues Party	0	0	0	0	0	0.9	229	+0.0%

== Ward results ==
Byfleet
Party	Candidate	Votes	%	±%
Conservative	Irene Watson Green	1,049	45.7	+10.3
Liberal Democrats	Suzanne Kittelsen	1,047	45.6	+7.6
Labour	David Mitchell	113	4.9	+1.1
UKIP	Marion Free	88	3.8	−3.3
Majority		2	0.1	
Turnout		2,297	41.9	−1.4
Conservative hold		Swing		

Goldsworth East
Party	Candidate	Votes	%	±%
Liberal Democrats	Bryan Cross	1,062	50.6	
Conservative	Hilary Addison	840	40.4	
Labour	Chanchal Kapoor	198	9.4	
Majority		222	10.2	
Turnout		2,100	39.3	
Liberal Democrats hold		Swing		

Goldsworth West
Party	Candidate	Votes	%	±%
Liberal Democrats	Denzil Coulson	810	64.2	+12.0
Conservative	Manish Gajjar	368	29.2	+1.6
Labour	John Bramall	83	6.6	−0.2
Majority		442	35.0	+10.4
Turnout		1,261	32.9	+4.9
Liberal Democrats hold		Swing		

Hermitage and Knaphill South
Party	Candidate	Votes	%	±%
Liberal Democrats	Kenneth Howard	760	54.0	+1.4
Conservative	Valerian Hopkins	535	38.0	+4.0
Labour	Graeme Carman	112	8.0	−5.4
Majority		225	16.0	−2.6
Turnout		1,407	35.5	+9.9
Liberal Democrats hold		Swing		

Horsell West (2)
Party	Candidate	Votes	%	±%
Liberal Democrats	Richard Sanderson	1,297		
Liberal Democrats	Gareth Davies	1,242		
Conservative	Anthony Branagan	1,163		
Conservative	Roger Wiltshire	1,027		
UKIP	Timothy Shaw	172		
Labour	Audrey Worgan	119		
UKIP	Richard Squire	107		
Labour	Christopher Lowe	88		
UK Community Issues Party	Michael Osman	79		
Turnout		5,294	51.4	+4.0
Liberal Democrats hold		Swing		
Liberal Democrats gain from Conservative		Swing		

Knaphill
Party	Candidate	Votes	%	±%
Liberal Democrats	Richard Sharp	1,302	49.4	+8.3
Conservative	Anthony Hayes-Allen	978	37.1	−15.5
UKIP	Matthew Davies	198	7.5	+7.5
Labour	Linda Kendall	157	6.0	−0.3
Majority		324	12.3	
Turnout		2,635	38.1	+3.6
Liberal Democrats gain from Conservative		Swing		

Maybury and Sheerwater
Party	Candidate	Votes	%	±%
Conservative	Mohammed Iqbal	1,357	48.6	+9.2
Labour	Mohammed Khan	896	32.1	−2.3
Liberal Democrats	Peter Hough	389	13.9	−8.9
UK Community Issues Party	Katrina Osman	150	5.4	+2.0
Majority		461	16.5	+11.5
Turnout		2,792	42.2	−1.2
Conservative gain from Labour		Swing		

Mayford and Sutton Green
Party	Candidate	Votes	%	±%
Conservative	Simon Bellord	675	71.0	−4.0
Liberal Democrats	Malcolm Randall	191	20.1	+2.8
UKIP	Dennis Davey	45	4.7	+0.8
Labour	Christopher Martin	40	4.2	+0.4
Majority		484	50.9	−6.8
Turnout		951	50.4	+5.5
Conservative hold		Swing		

Mount Hermon East
Party	Candidate	Votes	%	±%
Liberal Democrats	Norman Johns	860	48.4	+20.7
Conservative	David Bittleston	786	44.2	−12.2
UKIP	Judith Squire	69	3.9	−5.6
Labour	Michael Kelly	62	3.5	−2.9
Majority		74	4.2	
Turnout		1,777	48.7	+9.0
Liberal Democrats gain from Conservative		Swing		

Mount Hermon West
Party	Candidate	Votes	%	±%
Liberal Democrats	Susan Smith	970	56.7	+2.6
Conservative	Carl Thomson	603	35.2	+3.9
UKIP	Mary Kingston	77	4.5	−5.2
Labour	John Pitt	62	3.6	−1.3
Majority		367	21.5	−1.3
Turnout		1,712	43.3	+3.0
Liberal Democrats hold		Swing		

St Johns and Hook Heath
Party	Candidate	Votes	%	±%
Conservative	John Kingsbury	963	63.4	−9.5
Liberal Democrats	Andrew Larkham	271	17.8	−3.8
Independent	Adrian Gray	188	12.4	+12.4
UKIP	Marcia Taylor	52	3.4	+3.4
Labour	Colin Bright	46	3.0	−2.6
Majority		692	45.6	−5.7
Turnout		1,520	43.3	+8.1
Conservative hold		Swing		

West Byfleet
Party	Candidate	Votes	%	±%
Conservative	Frederick Webber-Taylor	1,183	66.8	+8.1
Liberal Democrats	Michael Wilson	249	14.1	+0.1
Independent	Richard Wilson	196	11.1	−10.5
Labour	Louise Every	87	4.9	−0.7
UKIP	Robin Milner	57	3.2	+3.2
Majority		934	52.7	+15.6
Turnout		1,772	44.6	+10.8
Conservative gain from Independent		Swing		
