= 2002 Woking Borough Council election =

2002 UK local government election

Map of the results of the 2002 Woking council election. Conservatives in blue, Liberal Democrats in yellow and Labour in red. Wards in grey were not contested in 2002.

The 2002 Woking Council election took place on 2 May 2002 to elect members of Woking Borough Council in Surrey, England. One third of the council was up for election and the council stayed under no overall control. Overall turnout in the election was 33.28%, down from 34.32% in 2000.

After the election, the composition of the council was:

- Conservative 17
- Liberal Democrat 13
- Labour 5
- Independent 1

== Election result ==
Woking local election result 2002
Party	Seats	Gains	Losses	Net gain/loss	Seats %	Votes %	Votes	+/−
Conservative	6	1	0	+1	46.2	44.9	8,488	-0.1%
Liberal Democrats	6	0	1	-1	46.2	39.5	7,483	+2.7%
Labour	1	0	0	0	7.7	13.8	2,605	-2.0%
UKIP	0	0	0	0	0	1.1	211	+1.1%
Independent	0	0	0	0	0	0.7	137	-1.8%

== Ward results ==
Byfleet
Party	Candidate	Votes	%	±%
Conservative	Todd	953	48.1	
Liberal Democrats	Anne Roberts	787	39.7	
Labour	Michael Roberts	241	12.2	
Majority		166	8.4	
Turnout		1,981	36.2	
Conservative gain from Liberal Democrats		Swing		

Goldsworth East
Party	Candidate	Votes	%	±%
Liberal Democrats	Cross	797	49.8	
Conservative	Bellord	488	30.5	
Labour	Ford	316	19.7	
Majority		309	19.3	
Turnout		1,601	29.7	
Liberal Democrats hold		Swing		

Goldsworth West
Party	Candidate	Votes	%	±%
Liberal Democrats	Landon	485	58.2	
Conservative	Lawrence	266	31.9	
Labour	Wand	83	10.0	
Majority		219	26.3	
Turnout		834	22.0	
Liberal Democrats hold		Swing		

Hermitage and Knaphill South (2)
Party	Candidate	Votes	%	±%
Liberal Democrats	Howard	695		
Liberal Democrats	Liddington	643		
Conservative	Fisher	366		
Conservative	Assi	317		
Labour	Carman	159		
Labour	Martin	147		
Turnout		2,327	30.6	
Liberal Democrats hold		Swing		
Liberal Democrats hold		Swing		

Horsell West
Party	Candidate	Votes	%	±%
Liberal Democrats	Sanderson	1,174	48.1	
Conservative	Atkins	1,047	42.9	
Labour	Worgan	131	5.4	
UKIP	Shaw	88	3.6	
Majority		127	5.2	
Turnout		2,440	46.2	
Liberal Democrats hold		Swing		

Knaphill
Party	Candidate	Votes	%	±%
Conservative	Hayes-Allen	849	45.2	
Liberal Democrats	Shoraka	816	43.5	
Labour	Allan	213	11.3	
Majority		33	1.7	
Turnout		1,878	28.7	
Conservative hold		Swing		

Maybury and Sheerwater
Party	Candidate	Votes	%	±%
Labour	Pope	950	59.1	
Conservative	Roe	293	18.2	
Liberal Democrats	Morales	227	14.1	
Independent	Osman	137	8.5	
Majority		657	40.9	
Turnout		1,607	24.8	
Labour hold		Swing		

Mayford and Sutton Green
Party	Candidate	Votes	%	±%
Conservative	Palmer	653	75.0	−0.5
Liberal Democrats	Leach	151	17.3	−1.0
UKIP	Davey	34	3.9	+3.9
Labour	Kendall	33	3.8	−2.5
Majority		502	57.7	+0.5
Turnout		871	44.9	
Conservative hold		Swing		

Mount Hermon East
Party	Candidate	Votes	%	±%
Conservative	Bittleston	728	60.6	
Liberal Democrats	Wilson	329	27.4	
Labour	Kennedy	90	7.5	
UKIP	Squire	54	4.5	
Majority		399	33.2	
Turnout		1,201	34.1	
Conservative hold		Swing		

Mount Hermon West
Party	Candidate	Votes	%	±%
Liberal Democrats	Smith	756	50.5	
Conservative	Hopkins	635	42.4	
Labour	Kapor	72	4.8	
UKIP	Squire	35	2.3	
Majority		121	8.1	
Turnout		1,498	40.6	
Liberal Democrats hold		Swing		

St Johns and Hook Heath
Party	Candidate	Votes	%	±%
Conservative	Kingsbury	856	69.1	
Liberal Democrats	Kremer	308	24.9	
Labour	Bramall	74	6.0	
Majority		548	44.2	
Turnout		1,238	35.2	
Conservative hold		Swing		

West Byfleet
Party	Candidate	Votes	%	±%
Conservative	Popham	1,037	71.6	
Liberal Democrats	Grimshaw	315	21.8	
Labour	Byrne	96	6.6	
Majority		722	49.8	
Turnout		1,448	36.9	
Conservative hold		Swing		
