= 2007 Woking Borough Council election =

2007 UK local government election

Results of the 2007 Woking Borough Council election

The 2007 Woking Council election took place on 3 May 2007 to elect members of Woking Borough Council in Surrey, England. One third of the council was up for election and the Conservative Party gained overall control of the council from no overall control.

After the election, the composition of the council was:

- Conservative 19
- Liberal Democrat 17

== Campaign ==
The election saw 12 seats being contested with 2 sitting councillors standing down, Neville Hinks in Knaphill ward and Mehala Gosling in West Byfleet. Both the Liberal Democrats and Conservatives were hoping to win control of the council, with the Liberal Democrats needing 1 more seat and the Conservatives 4. Labour were defending 3 seats which were all threatened by either the Conservatives or Liberal Democrats. The other parties standing in the election were the United Kingdom Independence Party, which was standing in more seats than Labour, and the UK Community Issues Party.

The Conservative campaign was described as being the strongest in years with the seats in Horsell and Knaphill being seen as critical in deciding who would control the council.

== Election result ==
The Conservatives won the election gaining a majority on the council, the first time any party had a majority since 1998 and the first time the Conservatives had held a majority since 1994. The Conservatives gained 4 seats in Kingfield and Westfield, Maybury and Sheerwater, Knaphill and Horsell to hold 19 seats compared to 17 for the Liberal Democrats. Meanwhile, Labour lost all 3 of their seats on the council including the party leader, Peter Ford, who lost in Old Woking to the Liberal Democrats. This was the first time Labour had ever failed to have any councillors on Woking council.

The Conservatives won almost 51% of the vote compared to their closest challengers, the Liberal Democrats, on just over 35%, with overall turnout in the election being 43.60%. Following the election the Conservative Anne Murray was expected to take over as leader of the council from Liberal Democrat Sue Smith.

Woking local election result 2007
Party	Seats	Gains	Losses	Net gain/loss	Seats %	Votes %	Votes	+/−
Conservative	9	4	0	+4	75.0	50.9	12,110	+5.7%
Liberal Democrats	3	1	2	-1	25.0	35.4	8,426	-5.6%
Labour	0	0	3	-3	0	8.7	2,063	+0.6%
UKIP	0	0	0	0	0	4.5	1,062	+1.1%
UK Community Issues Party	0	0	0	0	0	0.5	110	-0.4%

== Ward results ==
Byfleet
Party	Candidate	Votes	%	±%
Conservative	Simon Hutton	1,346	57.0	+11.3
Liberal Democrats	John Faulkner	1,017	43.0	−2.6
Majority		329	14.0	+13.9
Turnout		2,363	44.0	+2.1
Conservative hold		Swing		

Goldsworth East
Party	Candidate	Votes	%	±%
Liberal Democrats	Rob Leach	1,150	51.9	+1.3
Conservative	Hilary Addison	829	37.4	−3.0
Labour	Colin Bright	163	7.4	−2.0
UKIP	Judith Squire	72	3.3	+3.3
Majority		321	14.5	+4.3
Turnout		2,214	40.9	+1.6
Liberal Democrats hold		Swing		

Hermitage and Knaphill South
Party	Candidate	Votes	%	±%
Liberal Democrats	Tina Liddington	925	64.2	+10.2
Conservative	David Bittleston	313	21.7	−16.3
UKIP	Mary Kingston	102	7.1	+7.1
Labour	Graeme Carman	101	7.0	−1.0
Majority		612	42.5	+26.5
Turnout		1,441	36.3	+0.8
Liberal Democrats hold		Swing		

Horsell East and Woodham
Party	Candidate	Votes	%	±%
Conservative	Anne Murray	1,186	71.1	+13.5
Liberal Democrats	John Doran	307	18.4	−5.6
UKIP	Marion Free	108	6.5	−6.6
Labour	John Pitt	66	4.0	−1.4
Majority		879	52.7	+19.1
Turnout		1,667	47.9	+1.8
Conservative hold		Swing		

Horsell West
Party	Candidate	Votes	%	±%
Conservative	Beryl Hunwicks	1,395	50.7	
Liberal Democrats	Gareth Davies	1,093	39.8	
UKIP	Timothy Shaw	116	4.2	
Labour	Janice Worgan	98	3.6	
UK Community Issues Party	Katrina Osman	47	1.7	
Majority		302	10.9	
Turnout		2,749	51.8	+0.4
Conservative gain from Liberal Democrats		Swing		

Kingfield and Westfield
Party	Candidate	Votes	%	±%
Conservative	Stewart Brown	602	36.4	+10.5
Liberal Democrats	Paul Owen	527	31.9	−6.7
Labour	John Martin	417	25.2	+3.8
UKIP	Dennis Davey	106	6.4	−5.8
Majority		75	4.5	
Turnout		1,652	43.0	+2.7
Conservative gain from Labour		Swing		

Knaphill
Party	Candidate	Votes	%	±%
Conservative	Melanie Whitehand	1,158	44.3	+7.2
Liberal Democrats	Christian Morgan-Jones	1,113	42.5	−6.9
UKIP	Matthew Davies	203	7.8	+0.3
Labour	Christopher Martin	142	5.4	−0.6
Majority		45	1.8	
Turnout		2,616	37.2	−0.9
Conservative gain from Liberal Democrats		Swing		

Maybury and Sheerwater
Party	Candidate	Votes	%	±%
Conservative	Muzaffar Ali	1,177	38.8	−9.8
Liberal Democrats	Mohammed Bashir	1,040	34.2	+20.3
Labour	Elizabeth Evans	665	21.9	−10.2
UKIP	Rob Burberry	92	3.0	+3.0
UK Community Issues Party	Michael Osman	63	2.1	−3.3
Majority		137	4.6	
Turnout		3,037	45.8	+3.6
Conservative gain from Labour		Swing		

Old Woking
Party	Candidate	Votes	%	±%
Liberal Democrats	Colin Scott	337	39.7	+0.7
Labour	Peter Ford	325	38.3	−4.3
Conservative	Ashley Bowes	187	22.0	+3.6
Majority		12	1.4	
Turnout		849	41.0	+3.8
Liberal Democrats gain from Labour		Swing		

Pyrford
Party	Candidate	Votes	%	±%
Conservative	Peter Ankers	1,560	76.3	+13.4
Liberal Democrats	John Magid	359	17.6	−6.2
UKIP	Robin Milner	126	6.2	−3.8
Majority		1,201	58.7	+19.6
Turnout		2,045	51.4	+2.0
Conservative hold		Swing		

St Johns and Hook Heath
Party	Candidate	Votes	%	±%
Conservative	Graham Cundy	1,044	72.6	+9.2
Liberal Democrats	Andrew Larkham	326	22.7	+4.9
UKIP	Marcia Taylor	68	4.7	+1.3
Majority		718	49.9	+4.3
Turnout		1,438	41.2	−2.1
Conservative hold		Swing		

West Byfleet
Party	Candidate	Votes	%	±%
Conservative	Richard Wilson	1,313	77.2	+10.4
Liberal Democrats	Rashad Raja	232	13.6	−0.5
Labour	Mike Kelly	86	5.1	+0.2
UKIP	Richard Squire	69	4.1	+0.9
Majority		1,081	63.6	+10.9
Turnout		1,700	43.2	−1.4
Conservative hold		Swing		
