= 2015 Woking Borough Council election =

2015 UK local government election

Results of the 2015 Woking Borough Council election

The 2015 Woking Borough Council election took place on 7 May 2015 to elect one third of members to Woking Borough Council in England coinciding with other local elections held simultaneously with a General Election which resulted in increased turnout compared to the election four years before. Elections in each ward are held in three years out of four.

== Results ==
The Conservatives were starting from a high ‘baseline’, having performed very well in the previous equivalent local election in Woking in 2011 (which coincided with the AV Referendum). The Conservatives secured 49% of the vote, gaining two seats from the Liberal Democrats and losing one to Labour. Of the 12 wards up for election, the Conservatives won 10 and the LibDems and Labour won 1 each. This was the best Conservative local Borough election result in Woking, and the worst result for the LibDems, for many years, although the Conservative 49% share of the vote failed to match the 56% share of the vote achieved on the same day by their Parliamentary candidate Jonathan Lord as he secured re-election as Woking’s MP with a landslide majority of 20,810 votes (over the second-placed Labour Party candidate).

The result added one councillor (net) to the Conservative group that had enjoyed overall control of the Council since 2011 and that had been in power locally since 2007 (if one includes a short period of minority administration).

Woking Borough Council Election, 2015
Party	Seats	Gains	Losses	Net gain/loss	Seats %	Votes %	Votes	+/−
Conservative	24	2	1	▲1	83.33	49	19091	
Liberal Democrats	9	0	2	▼2	8.33	17	6808	
Labour	2	1	0	▲1	8.33	15	5901	
Independent	1	0	0	Steady	0	3	1350	
UKIP	0	0	0	Steady	0	11	4390	
Green	0	0	0	Steady	0	4	1377	
Patriotic Socialist	0	0	0	Steady	0	0.02	9	

=== Ward by ward ===
Byfleet
Party	Candidate	Votes	%	±%
Conservative	Harry Briggs	1445		
Independent	Amanda Boote	1050		
Liberal Democrats	Andy Grimshaw	558		
UKIP	Richard Squire	449		
Labour	Michael Wood	316		
Majority				
Turnout				
Conservative hold		Swing		

Goldsworth East
Party	Candidate	Votes	%	±%
Conservative	Hilary Addison	1592		
Liberal Democrats	James Sanderson	859		
Labour	Jay Butcher	766		
UKIP	Tim Read	377		
Majority				
Turnout				
Conservative hold		Swing		

Hermitage and Knaphill South
Party	Candidate	Votes	%	±%
Conservative	Paul Smith	1129		
Liberal Democrats	Tina Liddington	710		
UKIP	Troy De Leon	401		
Labour	Colin Bright	302		
Green	Vanessa King	118		
Majority				
Turnout				
Conservative gain from Liberal Democrats		Swing		

Horsell East and Woodham
Party	Candidate	Votes	%	±%
Conservative	Anne Murray	1849		
Liberal Democrats	Rosemary Johnson	361		
UKIP	Terry Knight	264		
Labour	Elizabeth Evans	241		
Green	Topher Dykes	140		
Majority				
Turnout				
Conservative hold		Swing		

Horsell West
Party	Candidate	Votes	%	±%
Conservative	Beryl Hunwicks	2117		
Liberal Democrats	Anne-Marie Barker	987		
UKIP	Stephen Herbert	385		
Labour	John Scott-Morgan	376		
Green	Joanna Kelly	198		
Patriotic Socialist	Leo Dix	9		
Majority				
Turnout				
Conservative hold		Swing		

Kingfield and Westfield
Party	Candidate	Votes	%	±%
Liberal Democrats	Will Forster	971		
Conservative	Natalie Bourne	922		
Labour	Nigel Jackson	440		
UKIP	Robert Shatwell	396		
Majority				
Turnout				
Liberal Democrats hold		Swing		

Knaphill
Party	Candidate	Votes	%	±%
Conservative	Melanie Whitehand	2645		
Labour	Richard Ford	659		
UKIP	Bradley Hough	617		
Liberal Democrats	Syed Jaffri	595		
Green	James Brierley	304		
Majority				
Turnout				
Conservative hold		Swing		

Maybury and Sheerwater
Party	Candidate	Votes	%	±%
Labour	Tahiz Aziz	1913		
Conservative	Colin Scott	1002		
UKIP	Judith Squire	416		
Independent	Ian Vousden	300		
Green	Will Hemmings	248		
Liberal Democrats	Norman Johns	214		
Majority				
Turnout				
Labour gain from Conservative		Swing		

Old Woking
Party	Candidate	Votes	%	±%
Conservative	John Lawrence	486		
Liberal Democrats	Louise Morales	467		
UKIP	Jim Gore	240		
Labour	Barney Pimentel	176		
Green	John Parkin	75		
Majority				
Turnout				
Conservative gain from Liberal Democrats		Swing		

Pyrford
Party	Candidate	Votes	%	±%
Conservative	Graham Chrystie	2076		
Liberal Democrats	Gareth Davies	366		
UKIP	Robin Milner	331		
Labour	Mohammed Khalid	154		
Green	Joel Street	140		
Majority				
Turnout				
Conservative hold		Swing		

St Johns and Hook Heath
Party	Candidate	Votes	%	±%
Conservative	Graham Cundy	1744		
Liberal Democrats	Rebecca Whale	320		
Labour	Tom Willis	216		
UKIP	Marcia Taylor	197		
Green	Hilary Griffiths	154		
Majority				
Turnout				
Conservative hold		Swing		

West Byfleet
Party	Candidate	Votes	%	±%
Conservative	Richard Wilson	2084		
Liberal Democrats	William Wolfe	400		
Labour	Katherine Kearey	342		
UKIP	Neil Willetts	317		
Majority				
Turnout				
Conservative hold		Swing		
