= 2023 Woking Borough Council election =

2023 English local election

← 2022	4 May 2023	2024 →

10 out of 30 seats to Woking Borough Council 16 seats needed for a majority

	First party	Second party	Third party
Leader	Ann-Marie Barker	Kevin Davis	Tahir Ahiz
Party	Liberal Democrats	Conservative	Labour
Last election	16 seats, 47.3%	8 seats, 30.8%	3 seats, 6.1%
Seats before	16	8	3
Seats won	8	0	1
Seats after	20	4	3
Seat change	▲4	▼4	Steady
Popular vote	13,736	6,743	2,841
Percentage	50.1%	24.6%	10.4%
Swing	▲2.8%	▼6.2%	▲4.3%
- Map of Woking electoral results
Leader before election
Ann-Marie Barker
Liberal Democrats
Leader after election
Ann-Marie Barker
Liberal Democrats

The 2023 Woking Borough Council election took place on 4 May 2023 to elect ten members (a third of the seats) of Woking Borough Council in Surrey, England. This was on the same day as other local elections in England. The election count took place on Friday 5 May 2023.

The Liberal Democrats increased their majority on the council, winning four seats from the Conservatives, who did not win any of the seats contested in 2023.

== Summary ==
=== Election result ===
2023 Woking Borough Council election
Party	This election			Full council			This election		
Party	Seats	Net	Seats %	Other	Total	Total %	Votes	Votes %	+/−
Liberal Democrats	8	+4	80.0	12	20	66.67	13,736	50.1	▲2.8
Conservative	0	-4	0.0	4	4	13.33	6,743	24.6	▼6.2
Labour	1	0	10.0	2	3	10.00	2,841	10.4	▲4.3
Independent	1	0	10.0	2	3	10.00	2,411	8.8	▼1.6
Green	0	0	0.0	0	0	0.00	1,500	5.5	▲0.8
Heritage	0	0	0.0	0	0	0.00	196	0.7	Steady

== Ward results ==
The Statement of Persons Nominated, which details the candidates standing in each ward, was released by Woking Borough Council following the close of nominations on 4 April 2023. The results for each ward were as follows, with an asterisk (*) indicating an incumbent councillor standing for re-election:

=== Byfleet and West Byfleet ===
Byfleet and West Byfleet
Party	Candidate	Votes	%	±%
Independent	Amanda Boote*	1,656	58.6	+6.2
Conservative	Jo Brown	581	20.5	−5.5
Liberal Democrats	David O'Brien	312	11.0	−10.5
Labour	Oliver Lester	176	6.2	New
Green	Danny Clarke	95	3.3	New
Majority		1,075	38.1	▲11.7
Turnout		2,824	32.0	▼5.2
Registered electors		8,813		
Independent hold		Swing		

=== Canalside ===
Canalside
Party	Candidate	Votes	%	±%
Labour	Anila Javaid	1,112	47.5	−0.9
Liberal Democrats	Susan Jordan	542	23.1	+6.0
Conservative	Abid Kayani	448	19.1	−15.5
Green	Will Hemmings	178	7.6	New
Majority		570	24.3	▲10.5
Turnout		2,342	29.5	−8.4
Registered electors		7,943		
Labour hold		Swing		

=== Goldsworth Park ===
Goldsworth Park
Party	Candidate	Votes	%	±%
Liberal Democrats	Martin Sullivan	1,335	57.0	−9.4
Conservative	Chitra Rana	593	25.3	−8.3
Labour	Samar Chaudhary	254	10.8	New
Green	Kate Kett	143	6.1	New
Majority		742	31.7	▼1.1
Turnout		2,340	34.1	▼2.6
Registered electors		6,856		
Liberal Democrats hold		Swing		

=== Heathlands ===
Heathlands
Party	Candidate	Votes	%	±%
Liberal Democrats	Leslie Rice	1,725	55.4	+6.2
Conservative	Trevor Leek	1,026	33.0	−2.5
Green	Jennifer Mason	159	5.1	−8.3
Labour	Canan Kandemir	135	4.4	New
Heritage	Judith Squire	55	1.7	−0.2
Majority		699	22.4	▲8.7
Turnout		3,111	44.1	▲0.6
Registered electors		7,058		
Liberal Democrats gain from Conservative		Swing		

=== Hoe Valley ===
Hoe Valley
Party	Candidate	Votes	%	±%
Liberal Democrats	Louise Morales*	1,477	67.5	+3.7
Conservative	Colin Scott	347	15.8	−4.7
Labour	Sebastian Purbrick	199	9.1	−0.3
Green	Ivica Petrikova	153	7.0	+0.7
Majority		1,130	51.7	▲8.4
Turnout		2,185	30.2	▼3.1
Registered electors		7,239		
Liberal Democrats hold		Swing		

=== Horsell ===
Horsell
Party	Candidate	Votes	%	±%
Liberal Democrats	Swati Mukherjee	2,131	63.0	+1.2
Conservative	Philip Gent	886	26.2	−5.5
Green	Christine Murphy	197	5.8	−0.7
Labour	John Scott-Morgan	148	4.3	New
Majority		1,245	36.8	
Turnout		3,380	46.7	▼5.4
Registered electors		7,239		
Liberal Democrats gain from Conservative		Swing		

=== Knaphill ===
Knaphill
Party	Candidate	Votes	%	±%
Liberal Democrats	Steve Greentree	1,149	39.1	+22.3
Conservative	Melanie Whitehead*	762	25.9	−9.2
Independent	Andy Adcroft	755	25.7	−22.4
Labour Co-op	Chris Martin	180	6.1	New
Green	Natalie Pattinson	84	2.8	New
Majority		387	13.2	
Turnout		2,937	36.4	▼0.2
Registered electors		8,076		
Liberal Democrats gain from Conservative		Swing		

=== Mount Hermon ===
Mount Hermon
Party	Candidate	Votes	%	±%
Liberal Democrats	Ian Johnson*	1,707	58.7	−5.8
Conservative	Sunny John	691	23.7	−1.9
Labour	Zara Coombes	226	7.7	New
Green	Cecilia Scott	225	7.7	−0.5
Heritage	Richard Squire	51	1.7	±0.0
Majority		1,016	35.0	
Turnout		2,906	37.6	▼1.3
Registered electors		7,728		
Liberal Democrats hold		Swing		

=== Pyrford ===
Pyrford
Party	Candidate	Votes	%	±%
Liberal Democrats	Chris Martin	1,716	57.7	+4.5
Conservative	Ben Maynard	873	29.3	−5.7
Labour Co-op	Sean O'Malley	233	7.8	−0.2
Green	John Bond	136	4.5	+0.7
Majority		843	28.4	
Turnout		2,972	39.9	▼4.0
Registered electors		7,458		
Liberal Democrats gain from Conservative		Swing		

=== St John's ===
St John's
Party	Candidate	Votes	%	±%
Liberal Democrats	Rob Leach*	1,642	63.6	+3.2
Conservative	Jayde Edwards	536	20.7	−7.7
Labour	Alexander Mitchell	178	6.8	New
Green	Louise Joyce	130	5.0	−3.2
Heritage	Tim Read	90	3.4	+0.3
Majority		1,106	42.9	
Turnout		2,581	36.2	▼4.1
Registered electors		7,130		
Liberal Democrats hold		Swing		
