= 2003 Woking Borough Council election =

2003 UK local government election

Map of the results of the 2003 Woking council election. Conservatives in blue, Liberal Democrats in yellow and Labour in red. Wards in grey were not contested in 2003.

The 2003 Woking Council election took place on 1 May 2003 to elect members of Woking Borough Council in Surrey, England. One third of the council was up for election and the council stayed under no overall control.

After the election, the composition of the council was:

- Conservative 17
- Liberal Democrat 12
- Labour 6
- Independent 1

== Background ==
The election saw 13 seats being contested with the contest in Brookwood ward being a by-election after the previous Conservative councillor, Mark Pritchard, resigned his seat on the council. Three long standing councillors also stood down at the election, Alf Stranks in Byfleet ward, Gordon Brown in Horsell East and Woodham and Rosemary Johnson in Old Woking. As well as candidates from the Conservatives, Liberal Democrats and Labour, there were also 3 from the United Kingdom Independence Party, 2 independents and 1 from the Green Party.

== Election result ==
No party won a majority in the election with the council remaining under no overall control as it had been since the 1998 election. The only party to have more seats after the election than before was Labour after they gained Old Woking from the Liberal Democrats by 26 votes. Meanwhile, the Conservatives and Liberal Democrats each gained one seat from the other, with the Conservatives taking Byfleet by 27 votes and the Liberal Democrats winning Brookwood by 7 votes. Overall turnout in the election was 33.66%.

The failure by the Conservatives to gain the two seats they needed to have a majority on the council was described as disappointing by commentators, in a year when the party gained seats nationally.

Woking local election result 2003
Party	Seats	Gains	Losses	Net gain/loss	Seats %	Votes %	Votes	+/−
Conservative	6	1	1	0	46.2	46.7	8,780	+1.3%
Liberal Democrats	4	1	2	-1	30.8	35.4	6,653	-4.1%
Labour	3	1	0	+1	23.1	13.1	2,463	-0.7%
Independent	0	0	0	0	0	2.5	461	+1.8%
UKIP	0	0	0	0	0	1.9	362	+0.8%
Green	0	0	0	0	0	0.4	76	+0.4%

== Ward results ==
Brookwood
Party	Candidate	Votes	%	±%
Liberal Democrats	Philip Goldenberg	358	44.1	+13.8
Conservative	Justin Boorman	351	43.2	−19.7
Green	Sandra Simkin	76	9.4	+9.4
Labour	Eric Kennedy	27	3.3	−3.5
Majority		7	0.9	
Turnout		812	43.8	
Liberal Democrats gain from Conservative		Swing		

Byfleet
Party	Candidate	Votes	%	±%
Conservative	Simon Hutton	1,026	46.0	−2.1
Liberal Democrats	Anne Roberts	999	44.8	+5.1
Labour	Brian Cozens	207	9.3	−2.9
Majority		27	1.2	−7.2
Turnout		2,232	41.0	+4.8
Conservative gain from Liberal Democrats		Swing		

Goldsworth East
Party	Candidate	Votes	%	±%
Liberal Democrats	Geoff Smith	727	52.2	+2.4
Conservative	Jeremy Yates	457	32.8	+2.3
Labour	Christopher Martin	210	15.1	−4.6
Majority		270	19.4	+0.1
Turnout		1,394	25.8	−3.9
Liberal Democrats hold		Swing		

Hermitage and Knaphill South
Party	Candidate	Votes	%	±%
Liberal Democrats	Tina Liddington	540	52.6	
Conservative	Hilary Addison	349	34.0	
Labour	Graeme Carman	137	13.4	
Majority		191	18.6	
Turnout		1,026	25.6	−5.0
Liberal Democrats hold		Swing		

Horsell East and Woodham
Party	Candidate	Votes	%	±%
Conservative	Anne Murray	814	58.7	
Liberal Democrats	Robert Leach	333	24.0	
UKIP	Michael Harvey	183	13.2	
Labour	Michael Roberts	56	4.0	
Majority		481	34.7	
Turnout		1,386	40.6	
Conservative hold		Swing		

Horsell West
Party	Candidate	Votes	%	±%
Conservative	Jim Armitage	1,129	50.1	+7.2
Liberal Democrats	Ann-Marie Barker	935	41.5	−6.6
Labour	Audrey Worgan	121	5.4	+0.0
UKIP	Timothy Shaw	69	3.1	−0.5
Majority		194	8.6	
Turnout		2,254	42.2	−4.0
Conservative hold		Swing		

Kingfield and Westfield
Party	Candidate	Votes	%	±%
Labour	John Martin	498	43.5	
Conservative	Norma Gruselle	321	28.1	
Liberal Democrats	Gareth Davies	215	18.8	
UKIP	Paul Davey	110	9.6	
Majority		177	15.4	
Turnout		1,144	28.8	
Labour hold		Swing		

Knaphill
Party	Candidate	Votes	%	±%
Liberal Democrats	Neville Hinks	977	47.8	+4.3
Conservative	Catherine Fisher	950	46.5	+1.3
Labour	Chanchal Kapoor	117	5.7	−5.6
Majority		27	1.3	
Turnout		2,044	30.5	+1.8
Liberal Democrats hold		Swing		

Maybury and Sheerwater
Party	Candidate	Votes	%	±%
Labour	Elizabeth Evans	593	40.8	−18.3
Liberal Democrats	Michael Wilson	397	27.3	+13.2
Conservative	David Roe	289	19.9	+1.7
Independent	Michael Osman	174	12.0	+3.5
Majority		196	13.5	−27.4
Turnout		1,453	22.2	−2.6
Labour hold		Swing		

Old Woking
Party	Candidate	Votes	%	±%
Labour	Richard Ford	304	42.6	+13.5
Liberal Democrats	Derek McCrum	278	39.0	−13.9
Conservative	Colin Kemp	131	18.4	+0.4
Majority		26	3.6	
Turnout		713	37.2	
Labour gain from Liberal Democrats		Swing		

Pyrford
Party	Candidate	Votes	%	±%
Conservative	Peter Ankers	1,285	72.3	
Liberal Democrats	Andrew Grimshaw	442	24.9	
Labour	Richard Cowley	50	2.8	
Majority		843	47.4	
Turnout		1,777	44.9	
Conservative hold		Swing		

St Johns and Hook Heath
Party	Candidate	Votes	%	±%
Conservative	Graham Cundy	899	72.9	+3.8
Liberal Democrats	Anthony Kremer	266	21.6	−3.3
Labour	John Bramall	69	5.6	−0.4
Majority		633	51.3	+7.1
Turnout		1,234	35.2	0.0
Conservative hold		Swing		

West Byfleet
Party	Candidate	Votes	%	±%
Conservative	Mehala Gosling	779	58.7	−12.9
Independent	Richard Wilson	287	21.6	+21.6
Liberal Democrats	Peter Hough	186	14.0	−7.8
Labour	Michael Byrne	74	5.6	−1.0
Majority		492	37.1	−12.7
Turnout		1,326	33.8	−3.1
Conservative hold		Swing		
