= Woking Civic Offices =

Municipal building in Woking, England

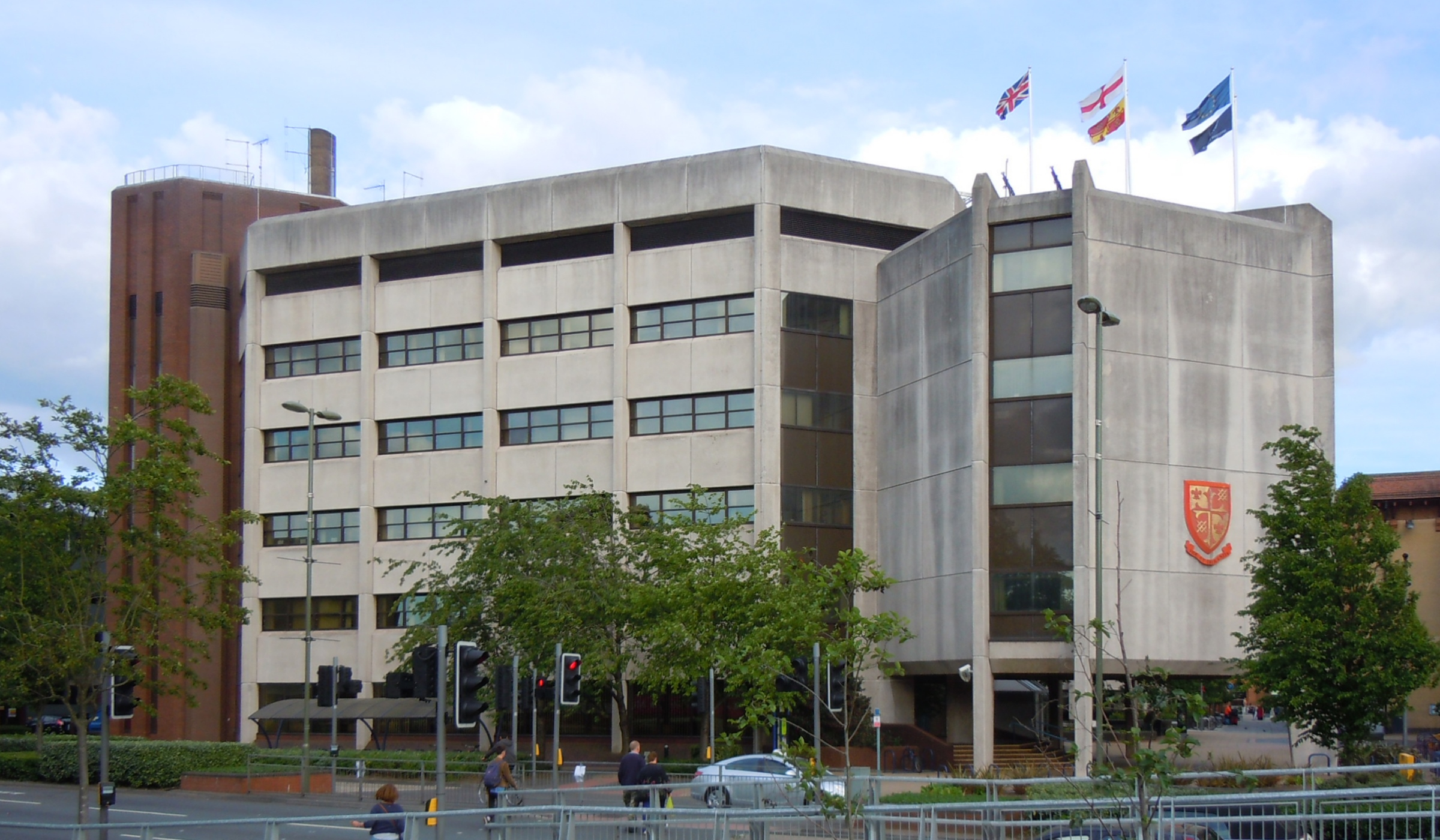
- The civic offices in 2015

- Shown in Surrey
- 51.3211°N 0.5590°W
- Location: Gloucester Walk, Woking

History
- Built: 1983

Site notes
- Architectural style: Brutalist

Woking Civic Offices is a municipal building in Gloucester Walk, Woking, Surrey, England. It is in use as the headquarters of Woking Borough Council.

== History ==
Following significant population growth, largely associated with the creation of various local institutions including a dramatic college and an invalid prison, the area became an urban district in 1894. The new council initially established it offices in rented accommodation in The Broadway. However, after the rented accommodation was destroyed in a fire, the council moved to better accommodation in Commercial Road. New offices, designed in the neoclassical style, were built there in brick with ashlar stone dressings and completed in 1905. The design involved a symmetrical main frontage of five bays facing Commercial Road. The central section of three bays featured a round headed doorway with a fanlight flanked by pilasters supporting a balcony; there was a French door on the first floor and a pediment containing a clock and two oculi above. The other bays were fenestrated with mullioned and transomed windows.

In the 1930s, with the increasing responsibilities of the council, the council leaders acquired a series of large houses in Guildford Road, Mount Herman Road and York Road to accommodate the extra staff. As part of the reorganisation of local government in 1974, Woking became a borough for the first time. In this context, the council leaders decided to commission new civic offices where all the staff would be co-located: they considered various sites including one in Guildford Road, but eventually selected a location adjacent to the Basingstoke Canal. The new building was designed in the Brutalist style, built in concrete and glass and was officially opened by the Duke of Gloucester on 20 April 1983. The council moved its staff into the new building in June 1983.

The design involved a six-storey rectangular wing adjacent to Victoria Way with a similar but shorter wing extending southeast from the northeast corner of the main wing. The two wings formed a pedestrian courtyard known as Gloucester Square. The main structure was supplemented by an octagonal formation containing the council chamber, which was cantilevered out to the southwest, and allowed vehicular access at ground floor level. The borough coat of arms was installed on two of the external walls of this structure. Internally, the principal room was the council chamber which featured a stained-glass window behind the mayor's chair. The stained glass recalled various aspects of local history including the railway, the canal and the airport. An emergency control centre was established in the basement of the building.

An extensive programme of refurbishment works to a design by Robinson Kenning & Gallagher was completed in 2019.

== See also ==
- List of Brutalist structures
