= 2011 Woking Borough Council election =

2011 UK local government election

Results of the 2011 Woking Borough Council election

The 2011 Woking Borough Council election was held on 5 May 2011 to elect members of the Woking Borough Council of the 13 open seats, the Conservative Party won 9 with 49.30% of the vote.

== Election result ==
Woking Borough Election, 2011
Party	Seats	Gains	Losses	Net gain/loss	Seats %	Votes %	Votes	+/−
Conservative	9				69.24%	49.30%	13,695	
Labour	0				0%	14.60%	4,062	
Liberal Democrats	4				31.11%	27.80%	7,715	
Peace	0				0%	0.00%	9	
UKIP	0				0%	8.20%	2,284	

== Ward results ==
Byfleet (1 Councillor)
Party	Candidate	Votes	%	±%
Labour	Anthony Mullins	276	11.00%	
Liberal Democrats	Barnabas Shelbourne	907	36.30%	
UKIP	Richard Squire	165	6.60%	
Conservative	Irene Watson Green	1,153	46.10%	
Majority				
Turnout		2,501	45.20%	

Goldsworth East (2 Councillors)
Party	Candidate	Votes	%	±%
Conservative	Hilary Addison	1,093	40.50%	
Labour	Tom Crisp	447	16.50%	
Liberal Democrats	Philip Goldenberg	817		
Conservative	Rizwan Shah	839		
UKIP	Marcia Taylor	215	8.00%	
Labour	Celia Wand	351		
Liberal Democrats	Amanda Van Niekerk	947	35.00%	
Majority				
Turnout		4,709	46.60%	

Hermitage & Knaphill South (1 Councillor)
Party	Candidate	Votes	%	±%
Conservative	Laura Ashall	585	34.20%	
UKIP	Duncan Clarke	162	9.50%	
Liberal Democrats	Christina Liddington	734	42.90%	
Labour	Carl Wolters	228	13.30%	
Majority				
Turnout		1,709	43.40%	

Horsell East & Woodham (1 Councillor)
Party	Candidate	Votes	%	±%
Labour	Elizabeth Evans	198	9.80%	
Liberal Democrats	James Sanderson	308	15.20%	
Conservative	Anne Smith	1,408	69.50%	
UKIP	Judith Squire	112	5.50%	
Majority				
Turnout		2,026	55.20%	

Horsell West (1 Councillor)
Party	Candidate	Votes	%	±%
Labour	Colin Bright	329	11.30%	
Liberal Democrats	Mark Hanley	691	23.80%	
Conservative	Beryl Hunwicks	1,654	57.00%	
UKIP	Timothy Shaw	230	7.90%	
Majority				
Turnout		2,904	54.40%	

Kingfield & Westfield (1 Councillor)
Party	Candidate	Votes	%	±%
UKIP	Leo Dix	168	9.00%	
Liberal Democrats	William Forster-Warner	731	39.20%	
Labour	Christopher Martin	434	23.30%	
Peace	Julie Roxburgh	9	0.50%	
Conservative	Alexander Smith	524	28.10%	
Majority				
Turnout		1,866	45.60%	

Knaphill (1 Councillor)
Party	Candidate	Votes	%	±%
UKIP	Matthew Davies	229	7.00%	
Labour	Richard Ford	363	11.10%	
Liberal Democrats	Lisa Harding	1,001	30.50%	
Conservative	Melanie Whitehand	1,692	51.50%	
Majority				
Turnout		3,285	46.50%	

Maybury & Sheerwater (1 Councillor)
Party	Candidate	Votes	%	±%
Labour	Mohammad Ali	1,016	31.10%	
Conservative	Muzaffar Ali	1,061	31.10%	
Liberal Democrats	Ajmal Latif	899	26.40%	
UKIP	David Roe	434	12.70%	
Majority				
Turnout		3,410	48.40%	

Old Woking (1 Councillor)
Party	Candidate	Votes	%	±%
Labour	Paul Brown	220	21.20%	
UKIP	Rob Burberry	139	13.40%	
Conservative	James Gore	292	28.20%	
Liberal Democrats	Louise Morales	386	37.20%	
Majority				
Turnout		1,037	47.20	

Pyrford (1 Councillor)
Party	Candidate	Votes	%	±%
Conservative	Graham Chrystie	1,547	67.20%	
Liberal Democrats	Andrew Grimshaw	439	19.10%	
UKIP	Robin Milner	158	6.90%	
Labour	Michael Wood	158	6.90%	
Majority				
Turnout		2,302	58.30%	

St. Johns & Hook Heath (1 Councillor)
Party	Candidate	Votes	%	±%
Conservative	Graham Cundy	1,303	67.70%	
UKIP	Marion Free	110	5.70%	
Liberal Democrats	Diana Landon	327	17.00%	
Labour	John Scott-Morgan	185	9.60%	
Majority				
Turnout		1,925	53.40%	

West Byfleet (1 Councillor)
Party	Candidate	Votes	%	±%
UKIP	Richard Gladstone	162	7.70%	
Labour	Jill Rawling	208	9.90%	
Conservative	Richard Wilson	1,383	65.90%	
Liberal Democrats	William Wolfe	345	16.40%	
Majority				
Turnout		2,098	49.20%	
