= 2024 Woking Borough Council election =

Local election in Surrey, England

| ← 2023 | 2 May 2024 | 2026 (WSC) → |

11 out of 30 seats to Woking Borough Council 16 seats needed for a majority

| | First party | Second party |
|---|---|---|
| Leader | Ann-Marie Barker | Amanda Boote |
| Party | Liberal Democrats | Independent |
| Last election | 20 seats, 50.1% | 3 seats, 8.8% |
| Seats before | 20 (Note: Including one vacant seat last held by a Liberal Democrat) | 4 |
| Seats won | 10 | 1 |
| Seats after | 24 | 5 |
| Seat change | ▲4 | ▲1 |
| Popular vote | 16,080 | 1,383 |
| Percentage | 53.7% | 4.6% |
| Swing | ▲3.6% | ▼4.2% |
| | Third party | Fourth party |
| Leader | Tahir Ahiz | Kevin Davis (defeated) |
| Party | Labour | Conservative |
| Last election | 3 seats, 10.4% | 4 seats, 24.6% |
| Seats before | 2 | 4 |
| Seats won | 0 | 0 |
| Seats after | 1 | 0 |
| Seat change | ▼1 | ▼4 |
| Popular vote | 3,913 | 7,454 |
| Percentage | 13.1% | 24.9% |
| Swing | ▲2.7% | ▲0.3% |
- Winner of each seat at the 2024 Woking Borough Council election
Leader before election
Ann-Marie Barker
Liberal Democrats
Leader after election
Ann-Marie Barker
Liberal Democrats

The 2024 Woking Borough Council election was held on 2 May 2024 to elect members of Woking Borough Council. There were 11 of the 30 seats of the council up for election, being the usual third of the council plus a by-election in Hoe Valley ward. The election took place at the same time as other local elections across England.

== Previous council composition ==
The Liberal Democrats have had a majority of seats on the council since 2022, winning a further additional four seats in this election to strengthen their hold. The Conservatives have lost seats in every Woking Borough Council election from 2018 onwards and the Labour Party has now been reduced to just one seat. With the exception of Labour’s single seat and the five independent councillors, no other political party has a seat on the council.

Council's composition just before the elections.

| After 2023 election | | Before 2024 election | |
| Party | Seats | Party | Seats |
|---|---|---|---|
| Liberal Democrats | 20 | Liberal Democrats | 19 |
| Conservative | 4 | Conservative | 4 |
| Independent | 3 | Independent | 4 |
| Labour | 3 | Labour | 2 |
| | | Vacant | 1 |

Changes 2023–2024:

- February 2024: Mohammed Ilyas Raja, elected for Labour, left the party to sit as an independent.
- 12 March 2024: A casual vacancy arises after the Lib Dem councillor for Hoe Valley resigns.

== Summary ==
The Liberal Democrats retained control of the council, increasing their number by four seats. The Conservatives lost all their remaining seats on the council.

=== Election result ===
2024 Woking Borough Council election
| Party | This election | | | Full council | | | This election | | |
| Party | Seats | Net | Seats % | Other | Total | Total % | Votes | Votes % | +/− |
|---|---|---|---|---|---|---|---|---|---|
| Liberal Democrats | 10 | ▲4 | 90.9 | 14 | 24 | 80.0 | 16,080 | 53.7 | +3.6 |
| Independent | 1 | ▲1 | 9.1 | 4 | 5 | 16.7 | 1,383 | 4.6 | –4.2 |
| Labour | 0 | ▼1 | 0.0 | 1 | 1 | 3.3 | 3,913 | 13.1 | +2.7 |
| Conservative | 0 | ▼4 | 0.0 | 0 | 0 | 0.0 | 7,454 | 24.9 | +0.3 |
| Green | 0 | Steady | 0.0 | 0 | 0 | 0.0 | 495 | 1.7 | –3.8 |
| Heritage | 0 | Steady | 0.0 | 0 | 0 | 0.0 | 235 | 0.8 | +0.1 |
| Reform | 0 | Steady | 0.0 | 0 | 0 | 0.0 | 224 | 0.7 | N/A |
| TUSC | 0 | Steady | 0.0 | 0 | 0 | 0.0 | 145 | 0.5 | N/A |

== Ward results ==
=== Byfleet and West Byfleet ===
Byfleet and West Byfleet
| Party | Candidate | Votes | % | ±% |
|---|---|---|---|---|
| Independent | Steve Howes | 1,383 | 44.7 | −13.9 |
| Conservative | Josh Brown* | 1,062 | 34.3 | +13.8 |
| Liberal Democrats | Erica Singharay | 349 | 11.3 | +0.3 |
| Labour | Oliver Lester | 302 | 9.8 | +3.6 |
| Majority | | 321 | 10.4 | |
| Turnout | | 3,096 | 34.65 | |
| Registered electors | | 8,957 | | |
| Independent gain from Conservative | | Swing | | |

=== Canalside ===
Canalside
| Party | Candidate | Votes | % | ±% |
|---|---|---|---|---|
| Liberal Democrats | Faisal Mumtaz | 1,224 | 42.2 | +19.1 |
| Labour | Tahir Aziz* | 1,195 | 41.2 | −6.3 |
| Conservative | Trevor Leek | 402 | 13.9 | −5.2 |
| TUSC | Eleanor Waple | 80 | 2.8 | New |
| Majority | | 29 | 1.0 | |
| Turnout | | 2,901 | 35.57 | |
| Registered electors | | 8,258 | | |
| Liberal Democrats gain from Labour | | Swing | | |

=== Goldsworth Park ===
Goldsworth Park
| Party | Candidate | Votes | % | ±% |
|---|---|---|---|---|
| Liberal Democrats | Ann-Marie Barker* | 1,505 | 68.5 | +11.5 |
| Conservative | Debbie Harlow | 362 | 16.5 | −8.8 |
| Labour | Chris Martin | 329 | 15.0 | +4.2 |
| Majority | | 1,143 | 52.0 | |
| Turnout | | 2,196 | 32.50 | |
| Registered electors | | 6,863 | | |
| Liberal Democrats hold | | Swing | | |

=== Heathlands ===
Heathlands
| Party | Candidate | Votes | % | ±% |
|---|---|---|---|---|
| Liberal Democrats | Pav Pandher | 1,484 | 51.4 | −4.0 |
| Conservative | Kevin Davis* | 833 | 28.9 | −4.1 |
| Reform | Allan Petrie | 224 | 7.8 | New |
| Labour | Sebastian Purbrick | 181 | 6.3 | +1.9 |
| Green | Paul Hoekstra | 136 | 4.7 | −0.4 |
| Heritage | Judith Squire | 28 | 1.0 | −0.7 |
| Majority | | 651 | 22.5 | |
| Turnout | | 2,886 | 40.74 | |
| Registered electors | | 7,118 | | |
| Liberal Democrats gain from Conservative | | Swing | | |

=== Hoe Valley ===
Hoe Valley
| Party | Candidate | Votes | % | ±% |
|---|---|---|---|---|
| Liberal Democrats | Will Forster* | 1,569 | 69.7 | +2.2 |
| Liberal Democrats | Tom Bonsundy-O'Bryan | 1,311 | 58.2 | −9.3 |
| Conservative | John Lawrence | 358 | 15.9 | +0.1 |
| Conservative | Martin Benstead | 298 | 13.2 | −2.6 |
| Labour | Francis Anyaegbu | 273 | 12.1 | +3.0 |
| Labour | Samar Chaudhary | 239 | 10.6 | +1.5 |
| Majority | | 953 | 42.3 | |
| Turnout | | 2,251 | 31.26 | |
| Registered electors | | 7,335 | | |
| Liberal Democrats hold | | Swing | | |
| Liberal Democrats hold | | Swing | | |

=== Horsell ===
Horsell
| Party | Candidate | Votes | % | ±% |
|---|---|---|---|---|
| Liberal Democrats | Melisa Kuipers | 2,177 | 66.7 | +3.7 |
| Conservative | Colin Scott | 713 | 21.8 | −4.4 |
| Green | Christine Murphy | 180 | 5.5 | −0.3 |
| Labour | John Scott-Morgan | 159 | 4.9 | +0.6 |
| TUSC | Emma Stephens-Ducros | 36 | 1.1 | New |
| Majority | | 1,464 | 44.9 | |
| Turnout | | 3,265 | 45.24 | |
| Registered electors | | 7,299 | | |
| Liberal Democrats hold | | Swing | | |

=== Knaphill ===
Knaphill
| Party | Candidate | Votes | % | ±% |
|---|---|---|---|---|
| Liberal Democrats | John Pearce | 1,460 | 46.8 | +7.7 |
| Conservative | Saj Hussain* | 1,257 | 40.3 | +14.4 |
| Labour | Dan Sampson | 403 | 12.9 | +6.8 |
| Majority | | 203 | 6.5 | |
| Turnout | | 3,120 | 38.36 | |
| Registered electors | | 8,191 | | |
| Liberal Democrats gain from Conservative | | Swing | | |

=== Mount Hermon ===
Mount Hermon
| Party | Candidate | Votes | % | ±% |
|---|---|---|---|---|
| Liberal Democrats | Ellen Nicholson* | 1,752 | 61.5 | +2.8 |
| Conservative | John Varghese | 574 | 20.1 | −3.6 |
| Labour | Mike Kelly | 263 | 9.2 | +1.5 |
| Green | Cecilia Townley | 179 | 6.3 | −1.4 |
| Heritage | Richard Squire | 52 | 1.8 | +0.1 |
| TUSC | Ravern Dimitrii-Simone | 29 | 1.0 | New |
| Majority | | 1,178 | 41.4 | |
| Turnout | | 2,849 | 36.93 | |
| Registered electors | | 7,768 | | |
| Liberal Democrats hold | | Swing | | |

=== Pyrford ===
Pyrford
| Party | Candidate | Votes | % | ±% |
|---|---|---|---|---|
| Liberal Democrats | Attia Aslam | 1,533 | 51.0 | −6.7 |
| Conservative | Steve Dorsett* | 1,148 | 38.2 | +8.9 |
| Labour | Sean O'Malley | 323 | 10.8 | +3.0 |
| Majority | | 385 | 12.8 | |
| Turnout | | 3,004 | 40.07 | |
| Registered electors | | 7,587 | | |
| Liberal Democrats gain from Conservative | | Swing | | |

=== St John's ===
St John's
| Party | Candidate | Votes | % | ±% |
|---|---|---|---|---|
| Liberal Democrats | Dale Roberts* | 1,716 | 66.9 | +3.3 |
| Conservative | Ben Maynard | 447 | 17.4 | −3.3 |
| Labour | Simona Popa | 246 | 9.6 | +2.8 |
| Heritage | Tim Read | 155 | 6.0 | +2.6 |
| Majority | | 1,269 | 49.5 | |
| Turnout | | 2,564 | 35.65 | |
| Registered electors | | 7,239 | | |
| Liberal Democrats hold | | Swing | | |

== Changes 2024-2026 ==
=== By-elections ===
==== Hoe Valley ====
Hoe Valley: 10 July 2025
| Party | Candidate | Votes | % | ±% |
|---|---|---|---|---|
| Liberal Democrats | Deborah Hughes | 1,118 | 62.8 | −6.9 |
| Reform | Sean Flude | 379 | 21.3 | +21.3 |
| Conservative | Robert Kwiatkowski | 130 | 7.3 | −8.6 |
| Green | Paul Hoekstra | 83 | 4.7 | +4.7 |
| Labour | Samar Chaudhary | 69 | 3.9 | −8.2 |
| Majority | | 739 | 41.5 | |
| Turnout | | 1779 | 24 | |
| Registered electors | | 7,336 | | |

== See also ==
- Woking Borough Council elections
