= 2012 Woking Borough Council election =

2012 UK local government election

Results of the 2012 Woking Borough Council election

The 2012 Woking Borough District Council election was held on 3 May 2012 to elect members of the Woking Borough Council. Of the 12 available seats, the Conservative Party and the Liberal Democrats tied by winning six seats each.

== Election result ==
Woking Borough Election, 2012
Party	Seats	Gains	Losses	Net gain/loss	Seats %	Votes %	Votes	+/−
Conservative	6				50%	43.40%	8,828	
Labour	0				0%	15.30%	3,116	
Liberal Democrats	6				50%	32.70%	6,639	
Peace	0				0%	0.20%	34	
UKIP	0				0%	8.40%	1,714	

== Ward results ==
Brookwood (1 Councillor)
Party	Candidate	Votes	%	±%
Conservative	Kevin Davis	468	70.40%	
Labour	Rebecca Geach	74	11.10%	
Liberal Democrats	Norman Johns	123	18.50%	
Majority				
Turnout		665	34.90%	

Byfleet (1 Councillor)
Party	Candidate	Votes	%	±%
Conservative	Carol Brailsford	644	34.60%	
Labour	Anthony Mullins	138	7.40%	−3.60%
Liberal Democrats	Anne Roberts	952	51.10%	
UKIP	Mathew Waters	128	6.90%	
Majority				
Turnout		1,862	33.20%	−12.0

Goldsworth East (1 Councillor)
Party	Candidate	Votes	%	±%
Labour	Tom Crisp	350	16.60%	+10.00%
Conservative	Colin Kemp	680	32.20%	
UKIP	Pamela Wellstead	128	6.10%	
Liberal Democrats	Amanda Van Niekerk	952	45.10%	+1.10%
Majority				
Turnout		2,110	34.40%	−12.20

Goldsworth West (1 Councillor)
Party	Candidate	Votes	%	±%
Conservative	Laura Ashall	270	28.60%	
Liberal Democrats	Ian Eastwood	515	54.50%	
Labour	Audrey Worgan	160	16.90%	
Majority				
Turnout		945	24.90%	

Horsell East & Woodham (1 Councillor)
Party	Candidate	Votes	%	±%
UKIP	Terence Knight	154	11.10%	
Labour	Jill Rawling	143	10.30%	
Liberal Democrats	James Sanderson	188	13.50%	−1.70%
Conservative	Michael Smith	905	65.10%	
Majority				
Turnout		1,390	37.50%	−17.7

Horsell West (1 Councillor)
Party	Candidate	Votes	%	±%
Conservative	Anthony Branagan	1,096	52.20%	
Labour	Colin Bright	329	11.30%	
Liberal Democrats	Rosemary Johnson	592	28.20%	
UKIP	Timothy Shaw	196	9.30%	+1.40%
Majority				
Turnout		2,099	39.10%	−15.3

Kingfield & Westfield (1 Councillor)
Party	Candidate	Votes	%	±%
Labour	Paul Brown	326	23.50%	
UKIP	Rob Burberry	149	10.70%	
Conservative	John Lawrence	304	21.90%	
Liberal Democrats	Derek McCrum	434		
Peace	Julie Roxburgh	9		
Majority				
Turnout		1,387	34.30%	−11.3

Knaphill (1 Councillor)
Party	Candidate	Votes	%	±%
UKIP	Matthew Davies	273	11.20%	+4.20%
Labour	Richard Ford	254	10.40%	−0.70%
Liberal Democrats	Lisa Harding	593	24.20%	−6.30%
Conservative	Sajjad Hussain	1,327	54.20%	
Majority				
Turnout		2,347	34.90%	−11.6

Maybury & Sheerwater (1 Councillor)
Party	Candidate	Votes	%	±%
Labour	Mohammad Ali	1,072		
Conservative	Raza Babar	685	21.50%	
Liberal Democrats	Mohammed Bashir	1,088	34.10%	
UKIP	David Roe	345	10.80%	−1.90%
Majority				
Turnout		3,190	43.90%	−4.5

The election in Maybury and Sheerwater was voided by the Election Commissioner Richard Mawrey on petition. The subsequent by-election was won by the Conservatives.

Mount Hermon East (1 Councillor)
Party	Candidate	Votes	%	±%
Conservative	David Bittleston	898	69.40%	
Labour	Sabir Hussain	143	11.10%	
Liberal Democrats	Michael Wilson	253	19.60%	
Majority				
Turnout		1,294	34.10%	

Mount Hermon West (1 Councillor)
Party	Candidate	Votes	%	±%
Labour	Elizabeth Evans	130	9.10%	
Liberal Democrats	Ian Johnson	691	48.20%	
Conservative	Colin Scott	510	35.60%	
UKIP	Francis Squire	102	7.10%	
Majority				
Turnout		1,433	31.60%	

Pyrford (1 Councillor)
Party	Candidate	Votes	%	±%
Conservative	Ashley Bowes	1,041	63.60%	
Liberal Democrats	Andrew Grimshaw	287	17.50%	−1.60%
UKIP	Robin Milner	199	12.10%	+5.20%
Labour	Michael Wood	111	6.80%	+0.10%
Majority				
Turnout		1,638	41.30%	−17.0
