= 2014 Woking Borough Council election =

Election in 2014

Results of the 2014 Woking Borough Council election

The 2014 Woking Borough Council election took place on 22 May 2014 to elect members of Woking Borough Council in England. This was on the same day as other local elections.
