= 2021 Woking Borough Council election =

2021 UK local government election

Map showing the results of the 2021 Woking Borough Council election

The 2021 Woking Borough Council election took place on 6 May 2021 to elect members of Woking Borough Council in England. This was on the same day as other local elections. Across the whole of Surrey there was also the Surrey County Council election and the election to be Surrey’s Police and Crime Commissioner (PCC). The Woking Borough Council election and the Surrey PCC election had both been delayed by a year because of the coronavirus pandemic. After the Borough elections the Conservative Party remained, by a margin of just one seat, the largest party on Woking Borough Council. Conservative Councillor Ayesha Azad continued to lead a Conservative minority administration, although the Council’s committee chairmanships were taken by opposition councillors.

== Results summary ==
Changes in votes and in percentage point performance etc. in the overall Results Summary chart, and in the individual Ward Results charts, relate to the most recent previous Borough election results in 2019. However, the net changes in the overall number of councillors by Party in the Results Summary chart relate back to the equivalent results in 2016 (i.e. when the councillors re-standing in 2021 last fought their seats).

Going into these elections, the ruling Conservative minority administration had 14 councillors, the Liberal Democrats had 10, Labour had 3 and there were 3 Independents. Cllr Graham Christie, who had defected from the Conservatives to the LibDems in 2019, failed to secure re-election in his Pyrford ward in his new political colours.

Following the elections, the council was described by one local newspaper as "going into disarray" as no party leader appeared particularly keen to be the Leader of the hung council. In the end, the Conservatives took charge and Cllr Ayesha Azad continued to run the council as a minority administration

2021 Woking Borough Council election
Party	This election			Full council			This election		
Party	Seats	Net	Seats %	Other	Total	Total %	Votes	Votes %	+/−
Conservative	4	▼2	40.0	9	13	43.3	12,311	40.4	+6.9
Liberal Democrats	5	▲3	50.0	7	12	40.0	11,010	36.1	+6.2
Labour	1	Steady	10.0	2	3	10.0	2,288	7.5	-2.3
Independent	0	▼1	0.0	2	2	6.7	2,539	8.3	-5.2
Green	0	Steady	0.0	0	0	0.0	1,923	6.3	-0.4
Heritage	0	Steady	0.0	0	0	0.0	297	1.0	New
UKIP	0	Steady	0.0	0	0	0.0	111	0.4	-6.3
TUSC	0	Steady	0.0	0	0	0.0	28	0.1	New

== Ward results ==
=== Byfleet and West Byfleet ===
Byfleet and West Byfleet
Party	Candidate	Votes	%	±%
Conservative	Josh Brown	1,301	42.7	+19.9
Independent	Neil Willetts	1,009	33.1	−20.3
Liberal Democrats	Peter Graves	429	14.1	+0.6
Green	Jim Craig	311	10.2	+5.7
Majority		292	9.6	—
Turnout		3,073	34.9	+3.5
Conservative gain from Independent		Swing	▲20.1	

=== Canalside ===
Canalside
Party	Candidate	Votes	%	±%
Labour	Tahir Aziz	1,371	50.3	+12.7
Conservative	Colin Scott	931	34.1	+4.0
Liberal Democrats	Anuj Sikka	314	11.5	−2.1
UKIP	William Roe	111	4.1	−7.4
Majority		440	16.2	+9.0
Turnout		2,747	36.8	−0.4
Labour hold		Swing	▲4.4	

=== Goldsworth Park ===
Goldsworth Park
Party	Candidate	Votes	%	±%
Liberal Democrats	Ann-Marie Barker	1,329	52.8	+10.6
Conservative	Jonny Cope	950	37.7	+6.8
Green	Kate Kett	240	9.5	+3.6
Majority		379	15.1	+3.8
Turnout		2,540	36.5	+1.3
Liberal Democrats hold		Swing	▲1.9	

=== Heathlands ===
Heathlands
Party	Candidate	Votes	%	±%
Conservative	Kevin Davis	1,474	47.9	−3.4
Liberal Democrats	Guy Cosnahan	1,218	39.6	+20.2
Green	Ella Walding	321	10.4	+0.6
Heritage	Judith Squire	63	2.0	N/A
Majority		256	8.3	−23.5
Turnout		3,096	43.4	+3.6
Conservative hold		Swing	▼11.8	

=== Hoe Valley ===
Hoe Valley
Party	Candidate	Votes	%	±%
Liberal Democrats	Will Forster	1,451	60.0	+3.2
Conservative	John Lawrence	586	24.2	+5.7
Labour	Sabir Hussain	187	7.7	−2.4
Green	Ivica Petrikova	136	5.6	−1.2
Heritage	Michael Heaton	59	2.4	N/A
Majority		865	35.8	−2.5
Turnout		2,427	33.0	+4.4
Liberal Democrats hold		Swing	▼1.3	

=== Horsell ===
Horsell
Party	Candidate	Votes	%	±%
Liberal Democrats	Adam Kirby	2,018	54.2	+19.3
Conservative	Beryl Hunwicks	1,708	45.8	+4.0
Majority		310	8.4	—
Turnout		3,761	52.3	+8.5
Liberal Democrats gain from Conservative		Swing	▲7.7	

=== Knaphill ===
Knaphill
Party	Candidate	Votes	%	±%
Conservative	Saj Hussain	1,700	50.8	+14.5
Independent	Hassan Akberali	1,073	32.1	+1.6
Liberal Democrats	Tom Spenser	291	8.7	−4.1
Labour	Gerry Mitchell	252	7.5	−0.6
TUSC	Nathan Holmes	28	0.8	N/A
Majority		627	18.7	+12.9
Turnout		3,364	41.2	+7.9
Conservative hold		Swing	▲6.5	

=== Mount Hermon ===
Mount Hermon
Party	Candidate	Votes	%	±%
Liberal Democrats	Ellen Nicholson	1,611	49.4	−1.6
Conservative	Carl Thomson	1,137	34.9	+6.0
Green	Christine Murphy	436	13.4	+6.4
Heritage	Damien Heads	76	2.3	N/A
Majority		474	14.5	−7.6
Turnout		3,275	41.9	+4.1
Liberal Democrats gain from Conservative		Swing	▼3.8	

=== Pyrford ===
Note that Graham Chrystie was previously elected as a Conservative councillor for the Pyrford ward, but defected to the Liberal Democrats, as a sitting councillor, in April 2019.

Pyrford
Party	Candidate	Votes	%	±%
Conservative	Steven Dorsett	1,400	39.5	+1.7
Liberal Democrats	Graham Chrystie	1,029	29.0	+14.6
Labour	Samar Chaudhary	478	13.5	+2.4
Independent	Daryl Jordan	457	12.9	−15.3
Green	Danny Clarke	181	5.1	+0.8
Majority		371	10.5	+0.9
Turnout		3,565	46.3	+7.1
Conservative hold		Swing	▼6.4	

=== St. John's ===
St. John's
Party	Candidate	Votes	%	±%
Liberal Democrats	Dale Roberts	1,320	46.5	−1.4
Conservative	Paul Smith	1,124	39.6	+9.3
Green	Jennifer Mason	298	10.5	+4.5
Heritage	Tim Read	99	3.5	N/A
Majority		196	6.9	−10.7
Turnout		2,863	39.9	+2.1
Liberal Democrats gain from Conservative		Swing	▼5.3	
