= 1999 Woking Borough Council election =

1999 UK local government election

The 1999 Woking Council election took place on 6 May 1999 to elect members of Woking Borough Council in Surrey, England.

== Summary ==
One third of the council was up for election. The council stayed under no overall control. Before the election the largest council party grouping, the Liberal Democrats, were two seats short of a majority. The effect of the election was to make the Liberal Democrats four seats short, to remove their option of relying on the independent councillor and vacant seat where necessary and calling for issue-by-issue full council chamber support of either a third of the local Conservatives or most of the local Labour Party councillors.

After the election, the composition of the council led by 35 councillors was:

- Liberal Democrat 14
- Conservative 12
- Labour 7
- Independent 1
- Vacant 1

There were no boundary changes (by the Boundary Commission) to affect comparisons made between this election and that of four year's before for the same vacancies. The council had had no single party overall control relatively frequently, for nine years of 25, since its creation in 1974.

== Election results ==
Woking local election result 1999
Party	Seats	Gains	Losses	Net gain/loss	Seats %	Votes %	Votes	+/−
Conservative	6			+2	50.0			
Liberal Democrats	3			-2	25.0			
Labour	2			0	16.7			
Independent	1			0	8.3			
