= 1998 Woking Borough Council election =

1998 UK local government election

The 1998 Woking Council election took place on 7 May 1998 to elect members of Woking Borough Council in Surrey, England. One third of the council was up for election and the Liberal Democrats lost overall control of the council to no overall control.

After the election, the composition of the council was

- Liberal Democrat 16
- Conservative 11
- Labour 7
- Independent 1

== Election result ==
Woking local election result 1998
Party	Seats	Gains	Losses	Net gain/loss	Seats %	Votes %	Votes	+/−
Liberal Democrats	5			-2	45.5			
Conservative	4			+2	36.4			
Labour	2			0	18.2			
