= Sheerwater =

Neighbourhood of Woking, Surrey, England

Coordinates: 51.330°N 0.530°W

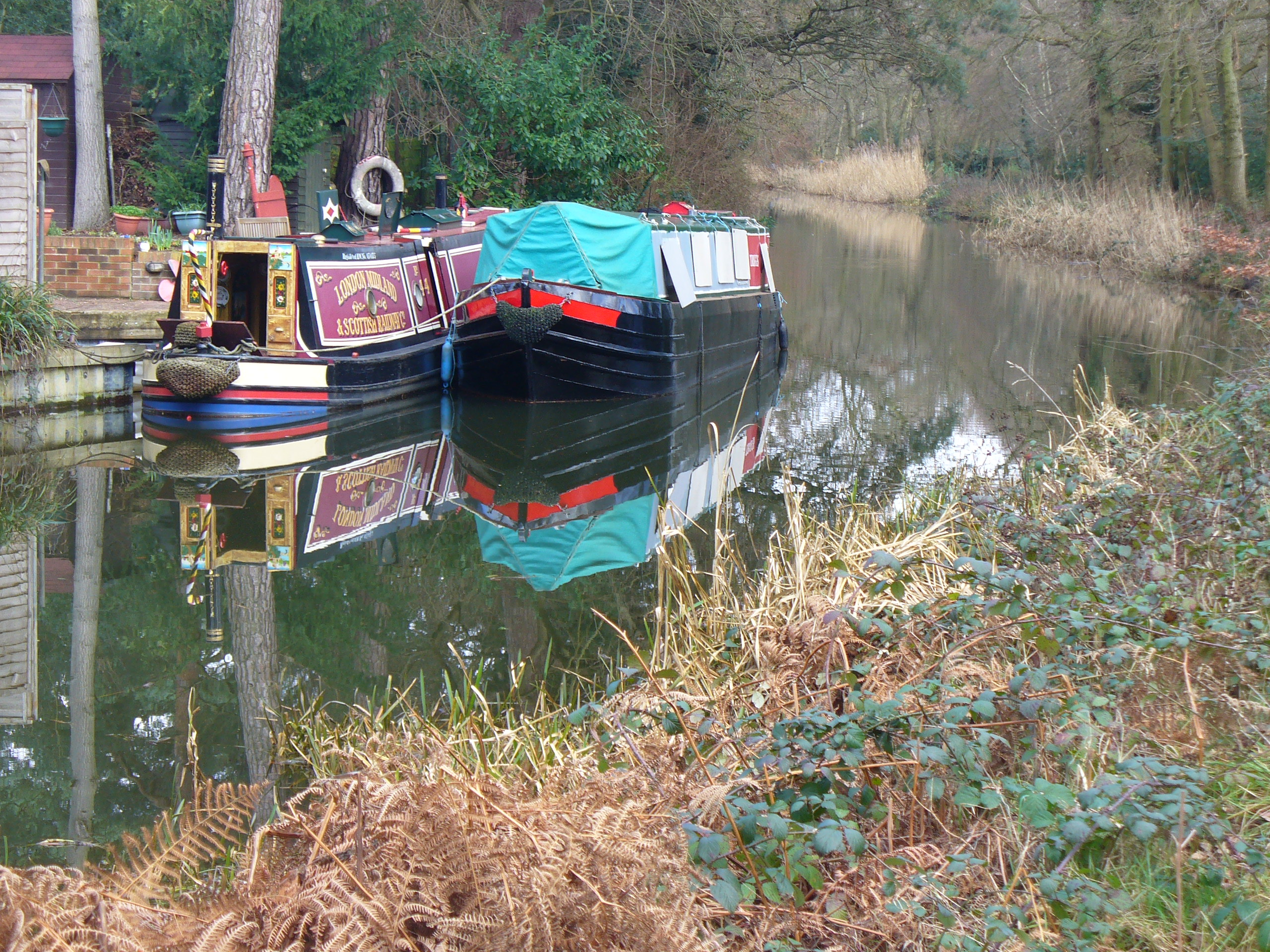
- Boats on the Basingstoke Canal

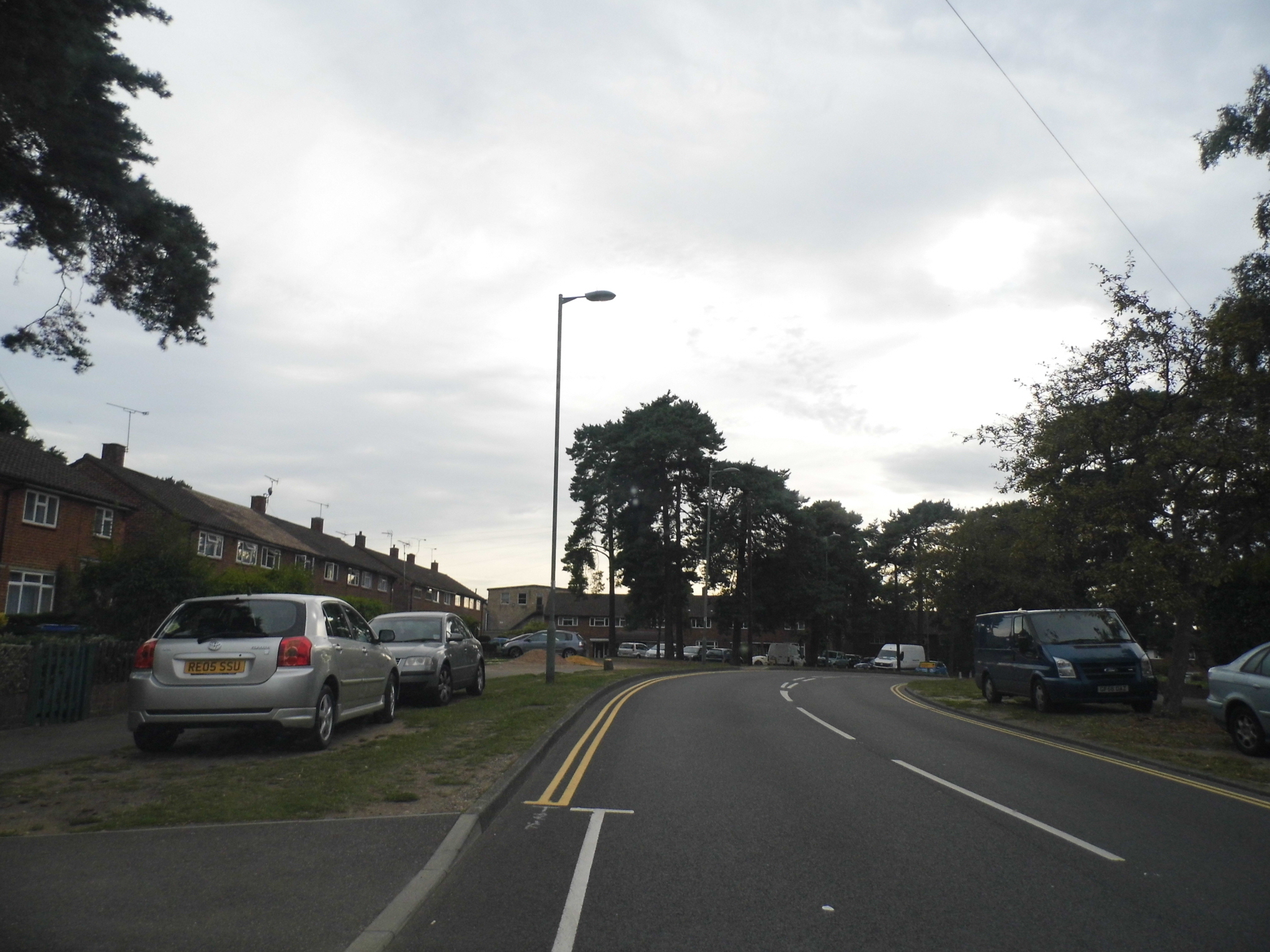
- A small part of Albert Drive with high pines, long-established in the soil type, see Bagshot Formation.

- Location within Surrey
- Population: 3,603
- OS grid reference: TQ0260
- District: Woking
- Shire county: Surrey
- Region: South East
- Country: England
- Sovereign state: United Kingdom
- Post town: Woking
- Postcode district: GU21
- Dialling code: 01932
- Police: Surrey
- Fire: Surrey
- Ambulance: South East Coast
- UK Parliament: Woking

Sheerwater is a residential neighbourhood or small suburb of Woking, in the Woking district in Surrey, England, occasionally described as a village, between West Byfleet and Horsell. Its border is defined to the north by a gently winding part of the Basingstoke Canal and to the south by the South West Main Line which passes from cutting level to that of an embankment. The neighbourhood has a business park and light industry at its south-western end. The whole area is linear, includes diverse green spaces to north and south, and covers 92 hectares (230 acres).

== History and geography ==
=== Sheerwater or Sherewater, Pyrford ===
Sheerwater was also spelt Sherewater until about 1900. Since the Norman Conquest it was a high sandy heath with a notable pond: Sherewater Pond, on the borders of Pyrford and Chertsey parishes, was an extensive mere on the high Bagshot Sand, drained and planted at the time of its enclosure, 29 September 1815. On enclosure it was allocated into private hands from public common land; a farm was created. John Aubrey then Edward Brayley, confused Sherewater with a pond by the Guildford road (A3) on Wisley Common, drained by Peter King, 7th Baron King, the Whig politician and writer, rather earlier. Sherewater Pond is marked on John Rocque's map (an 18th-century cartographer).

=== Boundaries ===
Sheerwater's farm became divided from Woodham by the Basingstoke Canal in about 1790 and from Pyrford by the South West Main Line in about 1838. Sherewater or Sheerwater Farm was approximately where the pond stood in 1911, just north of the railway.

To the east the area is bounded by the straight road, Sheerwater Road, and to the west the boundary is Monument Road.

Sheerwater is a linear settlement. Albert Drive is the through road of the neighbourhood. Elevations range between 35m above sea level in the central area and 30m at Sheerwater Bridge on the eastern boundary.

The Basingstoke Canal and the Rive Ditch are the only water features in the neighbourhood. There is just one lock on the Sheerwater section of the canal, just west of Sheerwater Road. The Rive Ditch enters Sheerwater at Monument Road and leaves at Sheerwater Road, it roughly follows the path of Albert Drive but has been routed completely underground since the area was developed in the 1950s.

=== Transformation by planned development ===
Sheerwater was designed as a new neighbourhood by the London County Council and approved by the local Urban District Council, allowing nearly 1,300 homes to be built in the early 1950s and over 5,000 people to settle in the neighbourhood.

In April 2017 Woking Borough Council approved the first phase of the redevelopment of the central part of Sheerwater. The first phase will comprise the construction of a leisure centre in the grounds of the Bishop David Brown School and the construction of a number of new homes on the land currently occupied by the athletics track.

== Amenities ==
Dartmouth Avenue is the main parade of shops which include two convenience stores, several fast food outlets, a cafe, a post office, a pharmacy and a glass/glazing business.

A large Asda superstore opened on Albert Drive in October 2014.

There is a church, St Michael's, on Dartmouth Avenue. It is shared by Methodist and Church of England congregations. There was also a Catholic church situated between Albert Drive and Dartmouth Avenue, but this closed in 1995. A small mosque opened in June 2017, also on Dartmouth Avenue.

Sheerwater had one pub, The Birch and Pines. This closed in April 2017.

Bishop David Brown School is a secondary school supported by the Anglican community in Sheerwater. Notable former Sheerwater residents and pupils were Paul Weller, Bruce Foxton and Rick Buckler who together with other pupils of the then Sheerwater Comprehensive School formed The Jam.

There is an allotment between Albert Drive and the South West Main Line.

There are no listed buildings in the neighbourhood.

== Sport and leisure ==
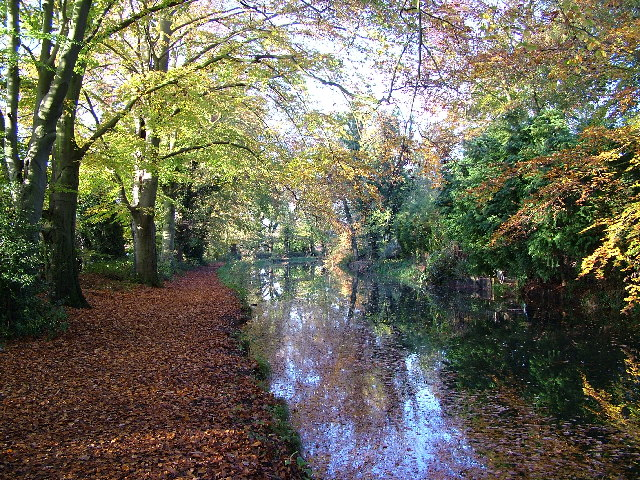
A natural habitat part of the cleared towpath beside the Basingstoke Canal, Sheerwater, which is particularly home to swans here.

Sheerwater Recreation Ground was created as part of the development of the area by London County Council in the 1950s. Ownership was transferred to the Urban District Council of Woking (now Woking Borough Council) on 26 September 1961 with the covenant that the land be used only as a recreation ground, children's playground or public open space. Part of the area is now an international size oval running track, home to Woking Athletics Club.

Sheerwater has a Non-League football club Sheerwater F.C. who play on the Sheerwater Recreation Ground.

Sheerwater has a Scout group and a Gardening Association.

The towpath of the Basingstoke canal is on the Sheerwater side, which provides a traffic-free pedestrian and cycle route to Woking town centre in one direction and to West Byfleet in the other.

== Local band ==
Three teenage residents formed the band The Jam in the 1970s while attending Sheerwater's secondary school including Paul Weller – the remainder of the band he led also attended the school.

== Economy ==
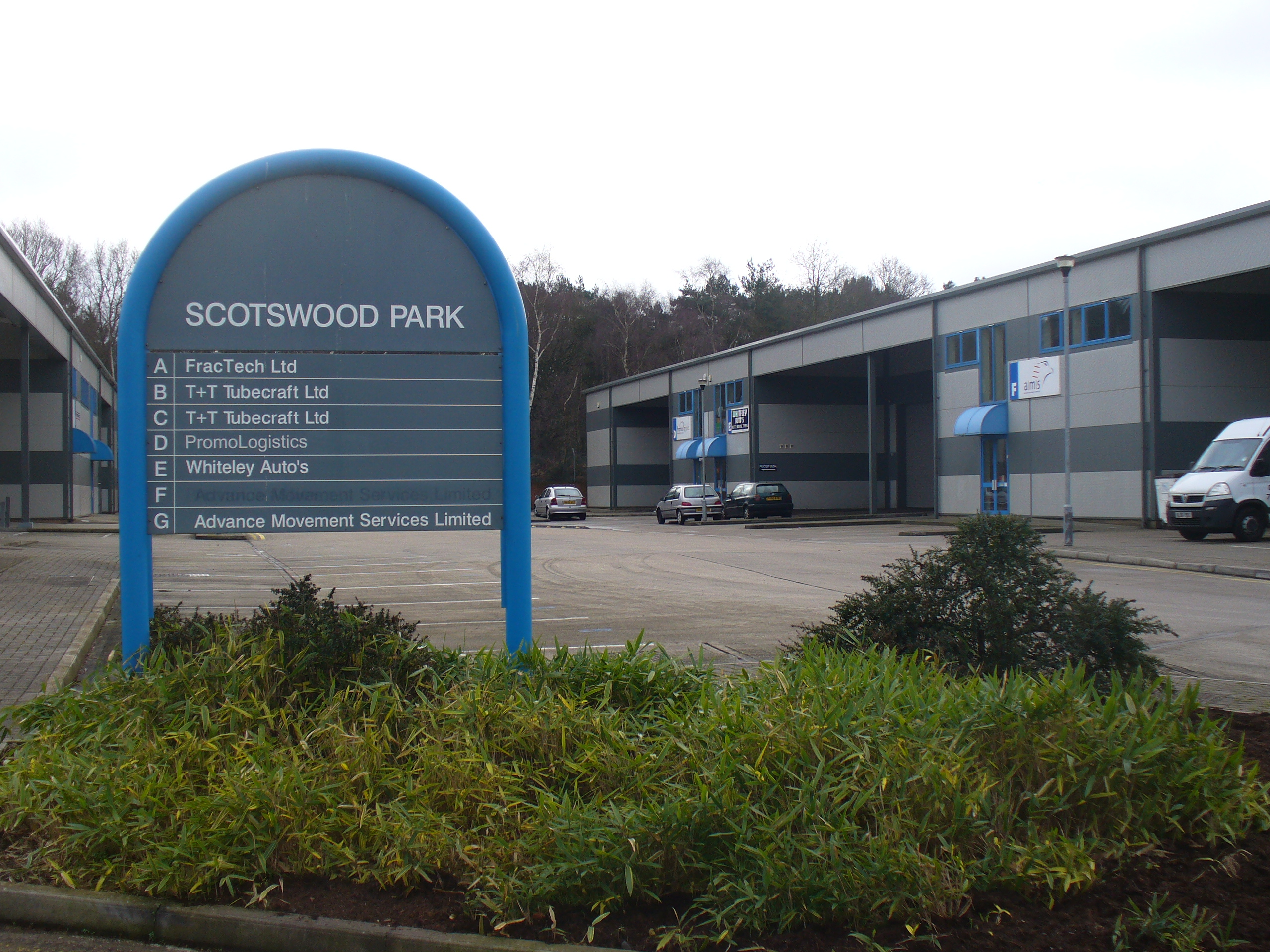
Scotwood Park is one of the more industrial business parks, suitable for storage and manufacturing

The Kingswey Business Park has been split into Optimum and Genesis Parks and others. Equally Woking Business Park adjoins the Oriental Road part of central Woking, at the north of Maybury and these fall within the neat boundaries of the Sheerwater suburb. Their businesses generally simplify their address to the post town of Woking, which has significant trade, distribution, professional services, scientific research and industry in medium-size business parks.

== Local government ==
Sheerwater was a ward of Woking Borough Council, electing a councillor in 2001; this was replaced before the 2011 census by Sheerwater and Maybury, electing one councillor, like most wards of the borough. The current councillor is of the Labour Party, Tahir Aziz, shared with Maybury. He is the only Labour councillor in the borough.

At Surrey County Council, one of the 81 representatives represents the area within the Woking North division.

Woking Borough Councillor
Election	Member	Ward
2011	Muzaffar Abdullah Ali	Maybury and Sheerwater
2015	Tahir Aziz	Maybury and Sheerwater

Surrey County Councillor
Election	Member	Electoral Division
2013	Ben Carasco	Woking North

== Demography ==
In 2001 Sheerwater's population was 3,522 living in 1,420 households.

The 2011 United Kingdom census, reflecting the local authority's expansion of the ward, at its most detailed reporting level split a new version of Sheerwater in two between local authority 'super output areas' 004E and 004F, the north-west and south-east respectively. The new definition excludes Arnold Road and Eve Road as well as cul-de-sacs next to these, instead being placed within Maybury's super output area.

Sheerwater is an ethnically diverse area, with around 57% in 004E and 52% in 004F coming from a White British background. The proportion of households in the two divisions of Sheerwater who owned their home outright was 10% above and 23% below the national average respectively. The proportion who owned their home with a loan was within 3% of the national average in both areas. The data showed in the second area a higher proportion than average of rented residential property and of social housing relative to the Surrey and national averages.

2011 Census Key Statistics
Output area	Population	Households	% Owned outright	% Owned with a loan	hectares
004E	2,038	694	20.5	35.4	50.3
004F	1,565	627	7.2	20.9	31.4
