= Woking Borough Council =

English non-metropolitan district council in Surrey, England

Type
- Type: Non-metropolitan district council

Leadership
- Mayor: Rob Leach, Liberal Democrat since 19 May 2026
- Leader: Ann-Marie Barker, Liberal Democrat since 23 May 2022
- Chief Executive: Richard Carr since April 2024

Structure
- Seats: 30 councillors
- Political groups: Administration (23) Liberal Democrats (23) Other parties (7) Independent (6) Labour (1)

Elections
- Last election: 2 May 2024
- Next election: To be Abolished

Meeting place
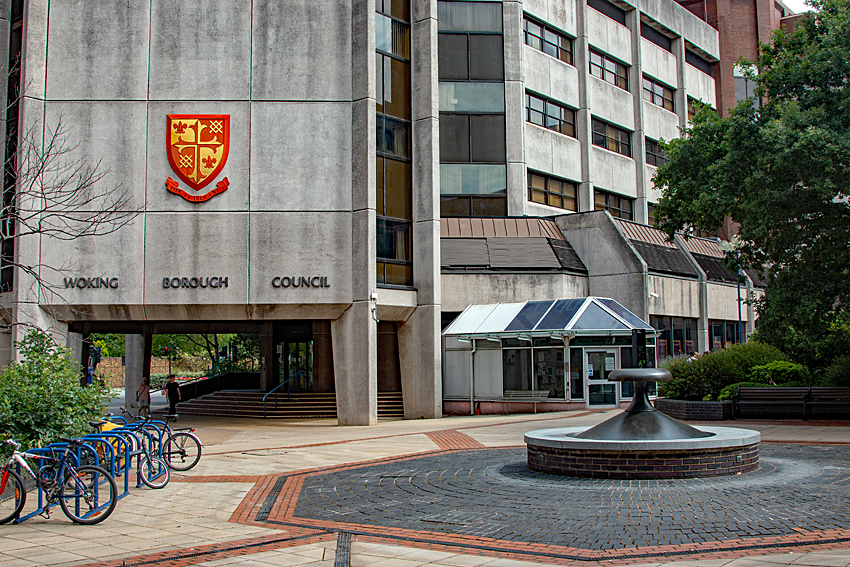
- Civic Offices, Gloucester Square, Woking, GU21 6YL

Website
- woking.gov.uk

Woking Borough Council is the local authority for Woking in Surrey, England. The council consists of 30 councillors, three for each of the 10 wards in the town. It is currently controlled by the Liberal Democrats, led by Ann-Marie Barker. The borough council is based at Woking Civic Offices.

Woking Borough Council, along with all Surrey district councils and Surrey County Council will be abolished in 2027 as part of ongoing local government restructuring, with the area of Elmbridge to become part of West Surrey, administered by West Surrey Council.

== History ==
The parish of Woking was made a local government district in 1893, governed by a local board. Such districts became urban districts in December 1894 under the Local Government Act 1894, and so the local board was replaced by Woking Urban District Council. The urban district was significantly enlarged in 1907 when it absorbed Horsell parish and again in 1933 when it absorbed Byfleet and Pyrford parishes.

The first woman elected to the council was Elizabeth Balfour in 1919.

On 1 April 1974, the urban district became a non-metropolitan district, altering its powers and responsibilities, although keeping the same area. The reformed district was also awarded borough status at the same time, allowing the chair of the council to take the title of mayor, with the council thereafter being called Woking Borough Council.

In May 2023, a government review revealed that the council would have debts of £2.4 billion by 2026, 100 times the size of its annual £24 million budget, largely attributed to unsuccessful investments in two skyscrapers, one residential and one a hotel, as well as smaller deals including a £6.4 million loan to a local private school and £2m spent on acquiring pubs. The deals were financed partly with £1.3bn low interest borrowing from the Public Works Loan Board. Risky property deals, also carried out by other local authorities such as Thurrock, Croydon, and Slough over the previous 5 years, were attempts to offset the impact of UK Government funding cuts. Nonetheless the review advised the council to borrow an additional £300m to avoid a fire-sale of assets. The Minister for Local Government, Lee Rowley, announced in May 2023 that the council was to be overseen by a team of expert commissioners until the council could "address their commercial and financial challenges, and make transformative change across its entire operations."

On 7 June 2023, Woking Borough Council issued a Section 114 notice after forecasting a deficit of £1.2 billion for the year ending 31 March 2024 due to losses on risky investments involving hotels and skyscrapers instigated by a former Conservative administration.

In February 2024, the government permitted the council to raise its council tax by up to 10%, above the normal 5% limit.

In February 2025, the Financial Reporting Council (FRC) regulator confirmed an investigation of two former employees at Woking, understood to be the former chief executive Ray Morgan and ex-finance director Leigh Clarke.

== Governance ==
Woking Borough Council provides district-level services. County-level services are provided by Surrey County Council. There are no civil parishes in the borough, which is an unparished area.

=== Political control ===
The council has been under Liberal Democrat majority control since 2022.

Political control of the council since the 1974 reforms has been as follows:

Party in control	Years
Conservative	1974–1986
No overall control	1986–1992
Conservative	1992–1994
No overall control	1994–1996
Liberal Democrats	1996–1998
No overall control	1998–2007
Conservative	2007–2009
No overall control	2009–2011
Conservative	2011–2019
No overall control	2019–2022
Liberal Democrats	2022–present

=== Leadership ===
The role of mayor is largely ceremonial in Woking. Political leadership is instead provided by the leader of the council. The leaders since 2006 have been:

Councillor	Party	From	To
Sue Smith	Liberal Democrats	22 May 2006	May 2007
Anne Murray	Conservative	May 2007	10 Jul 2008
John Kingsbury	Conservative	10 Jul 2008	2017
David Bittleston	Conservative	22 May 2017	15 Oct 2020
Ayesha Azad	Conservative	15 Oct 2020	May 2022
Ann-Marie Barker	Liberal Democrats	23 May 2022	

=== Composition ===
Following the 2024 election, and subsequent changes up to February 2026, the composition of the council was:

Party	Councillors
Liberal Democrats	23
Independent	6
Labour	1
Total	30

== Elections ==
Since the last boundary changes in 2016 the council has comprised 30 councillors representing 10 wards, with each ward electing three councillors. Elections were held three years out of every four, with a third of the council (one councillor for each ward) elected each time for a four-year term of office. Surrey County Council elections were held in the fourth year of the cycle when there were no borough council elections.

Further full borough council elections were cancelled in 2026, and an election for the new West Surrey Council was held instead. West Surrey Council will formally come into being and take over local government functions in the area on 1 April 2027, at which point Woking Borough Council and the borough of Woking will be abolished.

== Premises ==
The council is based at the Civic Offices on Gloucester Square. The building was purpose-built for the council and opened in 1983.
