= List of elections in 2000 =

The following elections occurred in the year 2000.

== Africa ==
- 2000 Egyptian parliamentary election
- 2000 Ethiopian general election
- 2000 Ghanaian presidential election
- 1999–2000 Guinea-Bissau general election
- 2000–01 Ivorian parliamentary election
- 2000 Ivorian presidential election
- 2000 Ivorian constitutional referendum
- 2000 Mauritian general election
- 2000 Ghanaian parliamentary election
- 2000 Senegalese presidential election
- 2000 Somali presidential election
- 2000 South African municipal elections
- 2000 Sudanese general election
- 2000 Tanzanian general election
- 2000 Zimbabwean constitutional referendum
- 2000 Zimbabwean parliamentary election

== Asia ==
- 2000–2001 Azerbaijani parliamentary election
- 2000 Egyptian parliamentary election
- 2000 Georgian presidential election
- 2000 Hong Kong legislative election
- 2000 Iranian legislative election
- 2000 Israeli presidential election
- 2000 Japanese general election
- 2000 Kyrgyz presidential election
- 2000 Lebanese general election
- 2000 Mongolian legislative election
- 2000 Omani general election
- 2000 Republic of China presidential election (Taiwan)
- 2000 South Korean legislative election
- 2000 Sri Lankan parliamentary election
- 2000 Syrian presidential election
- 2000 Tajik parliamentary election
- 2000 Uzbek presidential election

=== India ===
- 2000 Bihar Legislative Assembly election

=== Japan ===
- 2000 Japanese general election

=== Russia ===
- Elections in Astrakhan Oblast
- Krasnodar Krai Head of Administration elections
- 2000 Russian presidential election

=== Turkey ===
- 2000 Turkish presidential election

== Australia ==
- 2000 Benalla state by-election
- 2000 Bundamba state by-election
- 2000 Isaacs by-election
- 2000 Port Darwin by-election
- 2000 Woodridge state by-election

== Europe ==
- 2000 Albanian local elections
- 2000 Belarusian parliamentary election
- 2000 Belgian local elections
- 2000 Bosnian parliamentary election
- 2000 Croatian parliamentary election
- 2000 Croatian presidential election
- 2000 Czech Senate election
- 2000 Yugoslavian presidential election
- 2000 Finnish presidential election
- 2000 Finnish local elections
- 2000 Gibraltar general election
- 2000 Greek legislative election
- 2000 Greek presidential election
- 2000 Hungarian presidential election
- 2000 Lithuanian parliamentary election
- 2000 Montenegrin municipal elections
- 2000 Northern Cyprus presidential election
- 2000 Polish presidential election
- 2000 Portuguese regional elections
- 2000 Romanian local elections
- 2000 Romanian presidential election
- 2000 Romanian legislative election
- 2000 Serbian local elections
- 2000 Serbian parliamentary election
- 2000 Slovenian parliamentary election
- 2000 Ukrainian constitutional referendum

=== Austria ===
- 2000 Burgenland state election

=== France ===
- 2000 French constitutional referendum

=== Germany ===
- 2000 North Rhine-Westphalia state election
- 2000 Schleswig-Holstein state election

=== Italy ===
- 2000 Italian regional elections
- 2000 Abruzzo regional election
- 2000 Apulian regional election
- 2000 Basilicata regional election
- 2000 Calabrian regional election
- 2000 Campania regional election
- 2000 Emilia-Romagna regional election
- 2000 Lazio regional election
- 2000 Ligurian regional election
- 2000 Lombard regional election
- 2000 Marche regional election
- 2000 Molise regional election
- 2000 Piedmontese regional election
- 2000 Tuscan regional election
- 2000 Umbrian regional election
- 2000 Venetian regional election

=== Moldova ===
- 2000 Transnistrian legislative election

=== Russia ===
- Elections in Astrakhan Oblast
- Krasnodar Krai Head of Administration elections
- 2000 Russian presidential election

=== Spain ===
- 2000 Spanish general election

=== Turkey ===
- 2000 Turkish presidential election

=== United Kingdom ===
- 2000 Ayr by-election
- 2000 Ceredigion by-election
- 2000 Falkirk West by-election
- 2000 Glasgow Anniesland by-elections
- 2000 London Assembly election
- 2000 Preston by-election
- 2000 Romsey by-election
- 2000 South Antrim by-election
- 2000 Speaker of the British House of Commons election
- 2000 Tottenham by-election
- 2000 Ulster Unionist Party leadership election
- 2000 West Bromwich West by-election

==== United Kingdom local ====
- 2000 United Kingdom local elections
- 2000 London mayoral election

===== English local =====
- 2000 Adur Council election
- 2000 Amber Valley Council election
- 2000 Barrow-in-Furness Council election
- 2000 Blackpool Council election
- 2000 Bolton Council election
- 2000 Brentwood Council election
- 2000 Burnley Council election
- 2000 Bury Council election
- 2000 Calderdale Council election
- 2000 Cheltenham Council election
- 2000 Cherwell Council election
- 2000 Chorley Council election
- 2000 Craven Council election
- 2000 Daventry Council election
- 2000 Derby Council election
- 2000 Eastleigh Council election
- 2000 Ellesmere Port and Neston Council election
- 2000 Epping Forest Council election
- 2000 Fareham Council election
- 2000 Gateshead Council election
- 2000 Gosport Council election
- 2000 Halton Council election
- 2000 Harlow Council election
- 2000 Hart Council election
- 2000 Hartlepool Council election
- 2000 Hastings Council election
- 2000 Hull Council election
- 2000 Hyndburn Council election
- 2000 Ipswich Borough Council election
- 2000 Knowsley Council election
- 2000 Leeds City Council election
- 2000 City of Lincoln Council election
- 2000 Liverpool City Council election
- 2000 Manchester City Council election
- 2000 Mole Valley Council election
- 2000 Newcastle-under-Lyme Council election
- 2000 Oldham Council election
- 2000 Oxford City Council election
- 2000 Penwith Council election
- 2000 Portsmouth Council election
- 2000 Purbeck Council election
- 2000 Redditch Council election
- 2000 Rochdale Council election
- 2000 Rochford Council election
- 2000 Rossendale Council election
- 2000 Rugby Council election
- 2000 Runnymede Council election
- 2000 Rushmoor Council election
- 2000 Salford Council election
- 2000 Sefton Council election
- 2000 Solihull Council election
- 2000 South Lakeland Council election
- 2000 South Tyneside Council election
- 2000 Southampton City Council election
- 2000 Southend-on-Sea Council election
- 2000 St Albans Council election
- 2000 St Helens Council election
- 2000 Stevenage Council election
- 2000 Stratford-on-Avon Council election
- 2000 Swindon Council election
- 2000 Tamworth Council election
- 2000 Tandridge Council election
- 2000 Three Rivers Council election
- 2000 Thurrock Council election
- 2000 Torbay Council election
- 2000 Trafford Council election
- 2000 Tunbridge Wells Council election
- 2000 Wakefield Council election
- 2000 Watford Council election
- 2000 Waveney Council election
- 2000 Welwyn Hatfield Council election
- 2000 West Lancashire Council election
- 2000 West Lindsey Council election
- 2000 Weymouth and Portland Council election
- 2000 Wigan Council election
- 2000 Winchester Council election
- 2000 Windsor and Maidenhead Council election
- 2000 Wirral Council election
- 2000 Woking Council election
- 2000 Wokingham Council election
- 2000 Wolverhampton Council election
- 2000 Worcester Council election
- 2000 Worthing Council election
- 2000 Wyre Forest Council election

== Japan ==
- 2000 Japanese general election

== Mexico ==
- 2000 Mexican general election

== North America ==
- 1999–2000 Belizean municipal elections
- 2000 Mexican general election
- 2000 Salvadoran legislative election

=== Canada ===
- 2000 Prince Edward Island general election
- 2000 Yukon general election

==== Canadian federal ====
- 2000 Canadian federal election
  - Results of the 2000 Canadian federal election

==== Ontario municipal ====
- 2000 Brantford municipal election
- 2000 Greater Sudbury municipal election
- 2000 Guelph municipal election
- 2000 Hamilton, Ontario municipal election
- 2000 Norfolk County municipal election
- 2000 Ottawa municipal election
- 2000 Peterborough municipal election
- 2000 St. Catharines municipal election
- 2000 Toronto municipal election
- 2000 Vaughan municipal election
- 2000 Windsor municipal election

=== Caribbean ===
- 2000 Anguillan general election
- 2000 Caymanian general election
- 2000 Dominican Republic presidential election
- 2000 Dominican general election
- 2000 Haitian parliamentary election
- 2000 Haitian presidential election
- 2000 Saint Kitts and Nevis general election
- 2000 Saint Pierre and Miquelon legislative election
- 2000 Trinidad and Tobago general election

==== Puerto Rican ====
- 2000 Puerto Rican general election

=== Mexico ===
- Mexican general election

=== Peru ===
- Peruvian general election

=== Puerto Rican ===
- 2000 Puerto Rican general election

=== United States ===
- 2000 United States elections
- 2000 United States presidential election

==== United States lieutenant gubernatorial ====
- 2000 Delaware lieutenant gubernatorial election
- 2000 Missouri lieutenant gubernatorial election
- 2000 North Carolina lieutenant gubernatorial election
- 2000 Washington lieutenant gubernatorial election

==== United States gubernatorial ====
- 2000 Delaware gubernatorial election
- 2000 Indiana gubernatorial election
- 2000 Missouri gubernatorial election
- 2000 Montana gubernatorial election
- 2000 New Hampshire gubernatorial election
- 2000 North Carolina gubernatorial election
- 2000 North Dakota gubernatorial election
- 2000 United States gubernatorial elections
- 2000 Utah gubernatorial election
- 2000 Vermont gubernatorial election
- 2000 Washington gubernatorial election
- 2000 West Virginia gubernatorial election

==== Alabama ====
- 2000 United States presidential election in Alabama

==== Arizona ====
- English for Children (Arizona Proposition 203, 2000)
- 2000 United States Senate election in Arizona

==== Arkansas ====
- 2000 United States presidential election in Arkansas

==== California ====
- 2000 California State Assembly election
- 2000 California Democratic presidential primary
- 2000 California elections
- 2000 California Republican presidential primary
- 2000 San Francisco Board of Supervisors election
- 2000 California State Senate election
- 2000 United States House of Representatives elections in California
- 2000 United States Senate election in California

==== Colorado ====
- 2000 United States presidential election in Colorado

==== Delaware ====
- 2000 Delaware gubernatorial election

==== Florida ====
- 2000 United States Senate election in Florida

==== Georgia (U.S. state) ====
- 2000 United States House of Representatives elections in Georgia

==== Hawaii ====
- 2000 United States Senate election in Hawaii
- 2000 United States presidential election in Hawaii

==== Idaho ====
- 2000 United States presidential election in Idaho

==== Illinois ====
- 2000 Illinois's 1st congressional district election
- 2000 United States presidential election in Illinois

==== Iowa ====
- 2000 Iowa Democratic caucuses
- 2000 Iowa Republican caucuses
- 2000 United States presidential election in Iowa

==== Maine ====
- 2000 United States presidential election in Maine
- 2000 United States Senate election in Maine

==== Maryland ====
- 2000 United States Senate election in Maryland
- 2000 United States presidential election in Maryland

==== Massachusetts ====
- 2000 United States presidential election in Massachusetts
- 2000 United States Senate election in Massachusetts

==== Michigan ====
- 2000 United States Senate election in Michigan
- 2000 United States presidential election in Michigan

==== Missouri ====
- 2000 Missouri Democratic presidential primary
- 2000 Missouri Republican presidential primary
- 2000 United States Senate election in Missouri
- 2000 United States presidential election in Missouri

==== Montana ====
- 2000 United States Senate election in Montana

==== New Hampshire ====
- 2000 New Hampshire gubernatorial election

==== New Mexico ====
- 2000 United States Senate election in New Mexico
- 2000 United States presidential election in New Mexico

==== North Carolina ====
- 2000 North Carolina Council of State election
- 2000 North Carolina judicial elections
- 2000 North Carolina lieutenant gubernatorial election
- 2000 North Carolina gubernatorial election
- 2000 United States House of Representatives elections in North Carolina

==== North Dakota ====
- 2000 North Dakota gubernatorial election
- 2000 United States House of Representatives election in North Dakota
- 2000 United States Senate election in North Dakota

==== Oregon ====
- Oregon Ballot Measure 7 (2000)
- 2000 United States presidential election in Oregon

==== Pennsylvania ====
- 2000 Pennsylvania Attorney General election
- 2000 Pennsylvania Auditor General election
- 2000 Pennsylvania House of Representatives election
- 2000 Pennsylvania Senate election
- 2000 Pennsylvania state elections
- 2000 Pennsylvania State Treasurer election
- 2000 United States House of Representatives elections in Pennsylvania

==== Puerto Rican ====
- 2000 Puerto Rican general election

==== South Carolina ====
- 2000 South Carolina Republican presidential primary
- 2000 United States House of Representatives elections in South Carolina

==== Tennessee ====
- 2000 United States Senate election in Tennessee

==== United States House of Representatives ====
- 2000 United States House of Representatives elections
- 2000 United States House of Representatives elections in California
- 2000 United States House of Representatives elections in Georgia
- 2000 Illinois's 1st congressional district election
- 2000 United States House of Representatives election in North Dakota
- 2000 United States House of Representatives elections in South Carolina

==== United States Senate ====
- 2000 United States Senate elections
- 2000 United States Senate election in California
- 2000 United States Senate election in Connecticut
- 2000 United States Senate election in Georgia
- 2000 United States Senate election in Hawaii
- 2000 United States Senate election in Indiana
- 2000 United States Senate election in Maine
- 2000 United States Senate election in Massachusetts
- 2000 United States Senate election in Minnesota
- 2000 United States Senate election in Missouri
- 2000 United States Senate election in Montana
- 2000 United States Senate election in Nebraska
- 2000 United States Senate election in Nevada
- 2000 United States Senate election in New Mexico
- 2000 United States Senate election in New York
- 2000 United States Senate election in North Dakota
- 2000 United States Senate election in Ohio
- 2000 United States Senate election in Rhode Island
- 2000 United States Senate election in Tennessee
- 2000 United States Senate election in Texas
- 2000 United States Senate election in Arizona
- 2000 United States Senate election in Delaware
- 2000 United States Senate election in Florida
- 2000 United States Senate election in Maryland
- 2000 United States Senate election in Michigan
- 2000 United States Senate election in Mississippi
- 2000 United States Senate election in New Jersey
- 2000 United States Senate election in Utah
- 2000 United States Senate election in Vermont
- 2000 United States Senate election in Virginia
- 2000 United States Senate election in Washington
- 2000 United States Senate election in West Virginia
- 2000 United States Senate election in Wisconsin
- 2000 United States Senate election in Wyoming

==== Utah ====
- 2000 United States Senate election in Utah
- 2000 United States presidential election in Utah

==== Vermont ====
- 2000 United States presidential election in Vermont
- 2000 Vermont gubernatorial election

==== Virginia ====
- 2000 United States Senate election in Virginia
- 2000 United States presidential election in Virginia

==== Washington (U.S. state) ====
- 2000 United States presidential election in Washington (state)
- 2000 United States Senate election in Washington
- 2000 Washington attorney general election
- 2000 Washington gubernatorial election

==== Washington, D.C. ====
- 2000 United States presidential election in the District of Columbia

==== West Virginia ====
- 2000 United States Senate election in West Virginia
- 2000 United States presidential election in West Virginia

==== Wisconsin ====
- 2000 United States Senate election in Wisconsin

==== Wyoming ====
- 2000 United States Senate election in Wyoming

== Oceania ==
=== Australia ===
- 2000 Benalla state by-election
- 2000 Bundamba state by-election
- 2000 Isaacs by-election
- 2000 Port Darwin by-election
- 2000 Woodridge state by-election

=== Hawaii ===
- United States Senate election in Hawaii, 2000
- United States presidential election in Hawaii, 2000

== South America ==
- 1999–2000 Chilean presidential election
- 2000 Paraguayan vice presidential election
- Peruvian general election
- 2000 Surinamese general election
- 2000 Uruguayan municipal elections
- 2000 Venezuelan parliamentary election
- 2000 Venezuelan presidential election
