= Electoral results for the division of Port Darwin =

This is a list of electoral results for the Electoral division of Port Darwin in Northern Territory elections.

== Members for Port Darwin ==
| Member | Party | Term |
|---|---|---|
| Ron Withnall | Independent | 1974–1977 |
| Tom Harris | Country Liberal | 1977–1990 |
| Shane Stone | Country Liberal | 1990–2000 |
| Sue Carter | Country Liberal | 2000–2005 |
| Kerry Sacilotto | Labor | 2005–2008 |
| John Elferink | Country Liberal | 2008–2016 |
| Paul Kirby | Labor | 2016–present |

== Election results ==
=== Elections in the 1970s ===
1974 Northern Territory general election: Port Darwin
| Party | Candidate | Votes | % | ±% |
|---|---|---|---|---|
| Country Liberal | William Jettner | 622 | 35.6 | N/A |
| Independent | Ron Withnall; Brian Manning | 605 | 34.7 | N/A |
| Labor | James Gallacher | 519 | 29.7 | N/A |
| Total formal votes | | 1,823 | 96.7 | N/A |
| Informal votes | | 62 | 3.3 | N/A |
| Turnout | | 1,885 | 73.9 | N/A |
Two-candidate-preferred result
| Independent | Ron Withnall | 834 | 53.3 | N/A |
| Country Liberal | William Jettner | 731 | 46.7 | N/A |
| Independent win | | (new seat) | | |

- The number of primary votes each individual Independent received is unknown.

1977 Northern Territory general election: Port Darwin
| Party | Candidate | Votes | % | ±% |
|---|---|---|---|---|
| Country Liberal | Tom Harris | 535 | 32.8 | −2.8 |
| Labor | Michael Scott | 448 | 27.5 | −2.2 |
| Independent | Ron Withnall | 440 | 27.3 | N/A |
| Progress | Ian Smith | 146 | 9.0 | N/A |
| Communist | Brian Manning | 61 | 3.8 | N/A |
| Total formal votes | | 1,610 | 97.7 | N/A |
| Informal votes | | 38 | 2.3 | N/A |
| Turnout | | 1,648 | 74.7 | N/A |
Two-party-preferred result
| Country Liberal | Tom Harris | 984 | 60.5 | +13.8 |
| Labor | Michael Scott | 626 | 38.4 | +38.4 |
| Country Liberal gain from Independent | | Swing | | |

=== Elections in the 1980s ===
1980 Northern Territory general election: Port Darwin
| Party | Candidate | Votes | % | ±% |
|---|---|---|---|---|
| Country Liberal | Tom Harris | 885 | 57.3 | +24.1 |
| Labor | Jack Haritos | 541 | 35.0 | +7.2 |
| Marijuana | Peter Taylor | 73 | 4.7 | +4.7 |
| Democrats | Len Myles | 45 | 2.9 | +2.9 |
| Total formal votes | | 1,544 | 97.9 | N/A |
| Informal votes | | 33 | 2.1 | N/A |
| Turnout | | 1,577 | 80.5 | N/A |
| Country Liberal hold | | Swing | N/A | |

- Preferences were not distributed.

1983 Northern Territory general election: Port Darwin
| Party | Candidate | Votes | % | ±% |
|---|---|---|---|---|
| Country Liberal | Tom Harris | 1,510 | 68.6 | +11.3 |
| Labor | Russel Kearney | 690 | 31.4 | −3.6 |
| Total formal votes | | 2,200 | 96.4 | N/A |
| Informal votes | | 81 | 3.6 | N/A |
| Turnout | | 2,281 | 80.0 | N/A |
| Country Liberal hold | | Swing | | |

1987 Northern Territory general election: Port Darwin
| Party | Candidate | Votes | % | ±% |
|---|---|---|---|---|
| Country Liberal | Tom Harris | 975 | 53.2 | −15.4 |
| Labor | Russell Kearney | 509 | 27.8 | −3.6 |
| NT Nationals | James Maclean | 350 | 19.1 | +19.1 |
| Total formal votes | | 1,834 | 96.6 | N/A |
| Informal votes | | 65 | 3.4 | N/A |
| Turnout | | 1,899 | 64.0 | N/A |
Two-party-preferred result
| Country Liberal | Tom Harris | 1,231 | 67.1 | −0.9 |
| Labor | Russell Kearney | 603 | 32.9 | +0.9 |
| Country Liberal hold | | Swing | −0.9 | |

=== Elections in the 1990s ===
1990 Northern Territory general election: Port Darwin
| Party | Candidate | Votes | % | ±% |
|---|---|---|---|---|
| Country Liberal | Shane Stone | 1,436 | 53.5 | +0.3 |
| Labor | Peter Cavanagh | 588 | 21.9 | −5.9 |
| Greens | Jessie Kearney | 568 | 21.2 | +21.2 |
| NT Nationals | David Fuller | 91 | 3.4 | −15.7 |
| Total formal votes | | 2,683 | 98.0 | N/A |
| Informal votes | | 56 | 2.0 | N/A |
| Turnout | | 2,739 | 82.4 | N/A |
Two-party-preferred result
| Country Liberal | Shane Stone | 1,654 | 61.6 | −5.8 |
| Labor | Peter Cavanagh | 1,029 | 38.4 | +5.8 |
| Country Liberal hold | | Swing | −5.8 | |

1994 Northern Territory general election: Port Darwin
| Party | Candidate | Votes | % | ±% |
|---|---|---|---|---|
| Country Liberal | Shane Stone | 1,909 | 60.3 | +6.8 |
| Labor | Rodney Haritos | 1,032 | 32.6 | +10.7 |
| Greens | Andrea Jones | 227 | 7.2 | −14.0 |
| Total formal votes | | 3,168 | 97.4 | N/A |
| Informal votes | | 83 | 2.6 | N/A |
| Turnout | | 3,251 | 83.0 | N/A |
Two-party-preferred result
| Country Liberal | Shane Stone | 1,988 | 62.7 | −1.1 |
| Labor | Rodney Haritos | 1,180 | 37.3 | +1.1 |
| Country Liberal hold | | Swing | −1.1 | |

1997 Northern Territory general election: Port Darwin
| Party | Candidate | Votes | % | ±% |
|---|---|---|---|---|
| Country Liberal | Shane Stone | 2,083 | 64.5 | +4.3 |
| Labor | Geoffrey Carter | 827 | 25.6 | −7.0 |
| Independent | Lex Martin | 321 | 9.9 | +9.9 |
| Total formal votes | | 3,231 | 95.5 | N/A |
| Informal votes | | 153 | 4.5 | N/A |
| Turnout | | 3,384 | 84.3 | N/A |
Two-party-preferred result
| Country Liberal | Shane Stone | 2,164 | 67.0 | +5.0 |
| Labor | Geoffrey Carter | 1,067 | 33.0 | −5.0 |
| Country Liberal hold | | Swing | +5.0 | |

=== Elections in the 2000s ===
2000 Port Darwin by-election
| Party | Candidate | Votes | % | ±% |
|---|---|---|---|---|
| Country Liberal | Sue Carter | 1,694 | 51.0 | −13.4 |
| Labor | Ian Fraser | 873 | 26.3 | +0.7 |
| Independent | Susan Bradley | 551 | 16.6 | +16.6 |
| Greens | Andy Gough | 2-1 | 6.1 | +6.1 |
| Total formal votes | | 3,319 | 95.7 | +1.2 |
| Informal votes | | 113 | 4.3 | −1.2 |
| Turnout | | 3,432 | 70.5 | −13.8 |
Two-party-preferred result
| Country Liberal | Sue Carter | 2,031 | 61.2 | −5.8 |
| Labor | Ian Fraser | 1,288 | 38.8 | +5.8 |
| Country Liberal hold | | Swing | | |

2001 Northern Territory general election: Port Darwin
| Party | Candidate | Votes | % | ±% |
|---|---|---|---|---|
| Country Liberal | Sue Carter | 1,587 | 47.1 | −17.6 |
| Labor | Chris Bond | 1,220 | 36.2 | +10.5 |
| Independent | Nick Dondas | 563 | 16.7 | +16.7 |
| Total formal votes | | 3,370 | 97.0 | N/A |
| Informal votes | | 106 | 3.0 | N/A |
| Turnout | | 3,476 | 86.6 | N/A |
Two-party-preferred result
| Country Liberal | Sue Carter | 1,918 | 56.9 | −10.3 |
| Labor | Chris Bond | 1,452 | 43.1 | +10.3 |
| Country Liberal hold | | Swing | −10.3 | |

2005 Northern Territory general election: Port Darwin
| Party | Candidate | Votes | % | ±% |
|---|---|---|---|---|
| Labor | Kerry Sacilotto | 1,734 | 51.1 | +15.6 |
| Country Liberal | Sue Carter | 1,661 | 48.9 | +1.7 |
| Total formal votes | | 3,395 | 95.7 | N/A |
| Informal votes | | 152 | 4.3 | N/A |
| Turnout | | 3,547 | 78.2 | N/A |
| Labor gain from Country Liberal | | Swing | +8.4 | |

2008 Northern Territory general election: Port Darwin
| Party | Candidate | Votes | % | ±% |
|---|---|---|---|---|
| Country Liberal | John Elferink | 1,557 | 46.8 | −0.9 |
| Labor | Kerry Sacilotto | 1,231 | 37.0 | −14.6 |
| Greens | Gary Abbott | 538 | 16.2 | +16.2 |
| Total formal votes | | 3,326 | 96.9 | N/A |
| Informal votes | | 105 | 3.1 | N/A |
| Turnout | | 3,431 | 72.4 | N/A |
Two-party-preferred result
| Country Liberal | John Elferink | 1,757 | 52.8 | +4.8 |
| Labor | Kerry Sacilotto | 1,569 | 47.2 | −4.8 |
| Country Liberal gain from Labor | | Swing | +4.8 | |

=== Elections in the 2010s ===
2012 Northern Territory general election: Port Darwin
| Party | Candidate | Votes | % | ±% |
|---|---|---|---|---|
| Country Liberal | John Elferink | 2,023 | 55.5 | +8.7 |
| Labor | Alan James | 1,205 | 33.0 | −4.0 |
| Greens | David Andrews | 233 | 18.5 | −9.8 |
| Sex Party | Rowena Leunig | 185 | 5.1 | +5.1 |
| Total formal votes | | 3,646 | 97.4 | N/A |
| Informal votes | | 96 | 2.6 | N/A |
| Turnout | | 3,742 | 79.1 | N/A |
Two-party-preferred result
| Country Liberal | John Elferink | 2,173 | 59.6 | +6.8 |
| Labor | Alan James | 1,473 | 40.4 | −6.8 |
| Country Liberal hold | | Swing | +6.8 | |

2016 Northern Territory general election: Port Darwin
| Party | Candidate | Votes | % | ±% |
|---|---|---|---|---|
| Labor | Paul Kirby | 1,496 | 38.4 | +5.4 |
| Country Liberal | Rohan Kelly | 1,412 | 36.3 | −19.3 |
| Independent | Matthew Baker | 498 | 12.8 | +12.8 |
| Independent | Carol Phayer | 313 | 8.0 | +8.0 |
| 1 Territory | David Cameron | 123 | 3.2 | +3.2 |
| Independent | Kenneth Wu | 52 | 1.3 | +1.3 |
| Total formal votes | | 3,894 | 97.9 | N/A |
| Informal votes | | 82 | 2.1 | N/A |
| Turnout | | 3,976 | 75.3 | N/A |
Two-party-preferred result
| Labor | Paul Kirby | 1,875 | 52.8 | +12.5 |
| Country Liberal | Rohan Kelly | 1,676 | 47.2 | −12.5 |
| Labor gain from Country Liberal | | Swing | +12.5 | |

=== Elections in the 2020s ===
2020 Northern Territory general election: Port Darwin
| Party | Candidate | Votes | % | ±% |
|---|---|---|---|---|
| Country Liberal | Toby George | 1,625 | 37.8 | +1.5 |
| Labor | Paul Kirby | 1,611 | 37.5 | −1.0 |
| Territory Alliance | Gary Strachan | 540 | 12.6 | +12.6 |
| Greens | Timothy Parish | 315 | 7.3 | +7.3 |
| Independent | Leah Potter | 210 | 4.9 | +4.9 |
| Total formal votes | | 4,301 | 97.5 | N/A |
| Informal votes | | 112 | 2.5 | N/A |
| Turnout | | 4,413 | 77.4 | N/A |
Two-party-preferred result
| Labor | Paul Kirby | 2,233 | 51.9 | −0.9 |
| Country Liberal | Toby George | 2,068 | 48.1 | +0.9 |
| Labor hold | | Swing | −0.9 | |

2024 Northern Territory general election: Port Darwin
| Party | Candidate | Votes | % | ±% |
|---|---|---|---|---|
| Country Liberal | Robyn Cahill | 2,149 | 52.2 | +14.4 |
| Labor | Brian Manning | 972 | 23.6 | −13.9 |
| Greens | Greg Dickson | 681 | 16.5 | +9.2 |
| Independent | Leah Potter | 234 | 5.7 | +0.8 |
| Independent | Janey Davies | 83 | 2.0 | +2.0 |
| Total formal votes | | 4,119 | 97.1 | −0.4 |
| Informal votes | | 121 | 2.9 | +0.4 |
| Turnout | | 4,240 | 74.0 | |
Two-party-preferred result
| Country Liberal | Robyn Cahill | 2,543 | 61.7 | +13.7 |
| Labor | Brian Manning | 1,576 | 38.3 | −13.7 |
| Country Liberal gain from Labor | | Swing | +13.7 | |
