= Members of the Northern Territory Legislative Assembly, 1997–2001 =

This is a list of members of the Northern Territory Legislative Assembly from 1997 to 2001.

Name	Party	Electorate	Years in office
Peter Adamson	CLP	Casuarina	1994–2001
Jack Ah Kit	Labor	Arnhem	1995–2005
John Bailey ^{[2]}	Labor	Wanguri	1989–1999
Steve Balch	CLP	Jingili	1997–2001
Tim Baldwin	CLP	Victoria River	1994–2005
Loraine Braham	CLP/Independent ^{[4]}	Braitling	1994–2008
Hon Denis Burke	CLP	Brennan	1994–2005
Sue Carter ^{[3]}	CLP	Port Darwin	2000–2005
Hon Barry Coulter ^{[1]}	CLP	Blain	1983–1999
Stephen Dunham	CLP	Drysdale	1997–2005
John Elferink	CLP	MacDonnell	1997–2005, 2008–2016
Hon Stephen Hatton	CLP	Nightcliff	1983–2001
Paul Henderson ^{[2]}	Labor	Wanguri	1999–2013
Maggie Hickey	Labor	Barkly	1990–2001
Dr Richard Lim	CLP	Greatorex	1994–2007
Chris Lugg	CLP	Nelson	1997–2001
Hon Daryl Manzie	CLP	Sanderson	1983–2001
Clare Martin	Labor	Fannie Bay	1995–2008
Hon Terry McCarthy	CLP	Goyder	1983–2001
Terry Mills ^{[1]}	CLP	Blain	1999–2014, 2016–2020
Phil Mitchell	CLP	Millner	1994–2001
Mick Palmer	CLP	Karama	1983–2001
Hon Eric Poole	CLP	Araluen	1986–2001
Hon Mike Reed	CLP	Katherine	1987–2003
Maurice Rioli	Labor	Arafura	1992–2001
Syd Stirling	Labor	Nhulunbuy	1990–2008
Hon Shane Stone ^{[3]}	CLP	Port Darwin	1990–2000
Peter Toyne	Labor	Stuart	1996–2006

^{1} Blain CLP MLA Barry Coulter resigned on 18 June 1999. CLP candidate Terry Mills won the resulting by-election on 31 July.
^{2} Wanguri Labor MLA John Bailey resigned on 18 June 1999. Labor candidate Paul Henderson won the resulting by-election on 31 July.
^{3} Port Darwin CLP MLA Shane Stone resigned on 21 February 2000. CLP candidate Sue Carter won the resulting by-election on 11 March.
^{4} The member for Braitling, Loraine Braham, resigned from the Country Liberal Party on 7 February 2001, after losing party endorsement to recontest her seat at the coming election. She served out the remainder of her term as an independent.

== See also ==
- 1997 Northern Territory general election
