= Brit Hume =

American political commentator (born 1943)

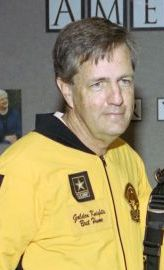
- Hume in 2004
- Born: Alexander Britton Hume; June 22, 1943 (age 83); Washington, D.C., U.S.
- Education: University of Virginia (BA)
- Occupations: Journalist; Political commentator
- Known for: Chief White House Correspondent for ABC News (1989–1996); Chief Political Analyst for Fox News (2008–present); Host of Special Report (1996–2008); Host of On the Record (2016)
- Spouses: Clare Jacobs Stoner (divorced); Kim Schiller (m. 1993)
- Children: 2, including Sandy

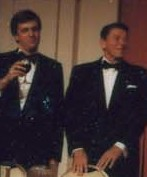
Hume with President Ronald Reagan in 1981

Alexander Britton Hume (born June 22, 1943), known professionally as Brit Hume, is an American journalist and political commentator. He had a 23-year career with ABC News, where he contributed to World News Tonight with Peter Jennings, Nightline, and This Week. Hume served as the ABC News chief White House correspondent from 1989 to 1996.

Hume spent 12 years as Washington, D.C., managing editor of the Fox News Channel and the anchor of Special Report with Brit Hume. After retiring as the anchor of Special Report in 2008, he became a senior political analyst for Fox News and a regular panelist on Fox News Sunday.

== Early life and education ==
He was born in Washington, D.C., the son of George Graham Hume and Virginia Powell (née Minnigerode) Hume. Through his father, Hume is of part Scottish descent, descended from George Home (1698–1760), a son of the 10th Baron of Wedderburn exiled to Virginia in the aftermath of the First Jacobite Rebellion.

Hume attended St. Albans School in Washington, D.C., at the same time as Al Gore and graduated from the University of Virginia in Charlottesville, Virginia, with a Bachelor of Arts in English in 1965.

== Career ==
=== Print journalism ===
Hume worked first for The Hartford Times newspaper company, and later for United Press International and the newspaper Baltimore Evening Sun. He then worked for syndicated columnist Jack Anderson from 1970 to 1972.

In 1971, Grossman Publishers published Hume's first book, Death and the mines: Rebellion and murder in the United Mine Workers, a work revolving around complicity of the U.S. Bureau of Mines, coal companies, and the United Mine Workers union resulting in the mistreatment of average miners.

Hume reported a story for Anderson's column "Washington Merry-Go-Round" that after ITT Corporation had contributed $400,000 to the 1972 Republican National Convention, President Richard Nixon's Department of Justice settled the antitrust case against ITT. Anderson published a series of classified documents indicating the Nixon administration, contrary to its public pronouncements, had favored Pakistan during the Indo-Pakistani War of 1971. After the revelations, Anderson and his staff, including Hume and his family, were briefly surveilled by the Central Intelligence Agency in 1972. The agents observed his family going about its daily business. The documents were revealed during President Gerald Ford's administration by congressional hearings and as a result of a Freedom of Information Act lawsuit and the so-called 'Family Jewels' revelations.

In 1973, Hume became Washington editor of MORE magazine, a press criticism journal, and in 1974 Doubleday published his second book, Inside Story.

=== 1973–1996: ABC News ===
In 1973, Hume started working for ABC News as a consultant, and in 1976, he was offered a job as a correspondent, covering the U.S. House of Representatives and U.S. Senate for 11 years. In 1979, Hume earned television's first Academy Award nomination for his work on The Killing Ground for ABC's Close-Up documentary program.

Hume was assigned to report on Walter Mondale's 1984 presidential campaign, and George H. W. Bush's 1988 presidential campaign. In 1989, he became ABC's chief White House correspondent, covering the administrations of Presidents Bush and Bill Clinton and working closely with ABC anchors Peter Jennings and Charlie Gibson.

=== 1996–present: Fox News ===
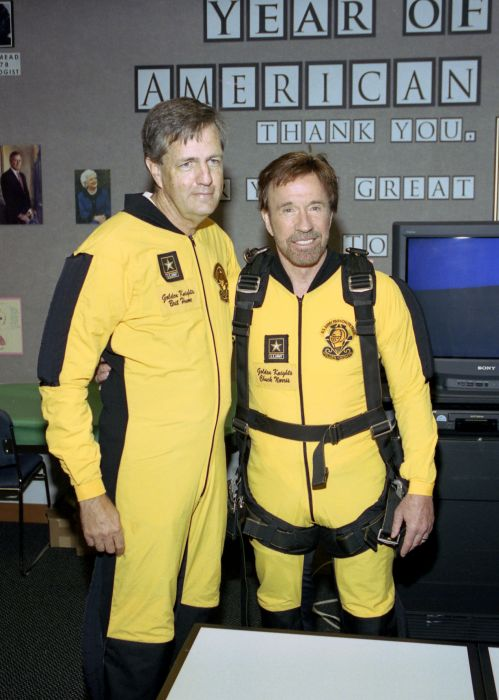
Brit Hume and Chuck Norris pose in the George Bush Presidential Library Classroom in College Station, Texas, at President Bush's 80th birthday celebration

In 1996, Hume left ABC for the Fox News Network for which his wife had recently become chief of the Washington bureau. At his last news conference as ABC's chief White House correspondent, President Clinton told him, "I think all of us think you have done an extraordinary, professional job under Republican and Democratic administrations alike." Hume became Fox News's Washington managing editor.

==== Special Report w/ Brit Hume (1998–2008) ====
After he began at Fox News, Hume was in discussions about starting a Washington-based television news program for the 6 p.m. timeslot. The Lewinsky scandal began during January 1998, and Hume's wife told him the story was so well known that he should start the show immediately. Special Report with Brit Hume debuted that evening in that timeslot.

Hume said of the start of his time at Fox that "we made some progress and developed some audience and the Lewinsky scandal brought a lot of interest and the 2000 election brought a lot of interest, but what really did it was the Florida recount – that was tremendous for us because the people who were worried about how that would come out wanted some place where they could trust the coverage, people who were conservatives or Republicans or neither but worried. And we really made an effort to cover that story well. And that built our audience."

The show was the number one cable news program in the 6:00 p.m. Eastern timeslot for several years.

In July 2008, it was announced that Hume would retire as anchor of Special Report at the end of the year, but he would remain on Fox News in a different role. On December 23, 2008, he hosted his final episode as anchor of Special Report, announcing that Bret Baier, then the chief White House correspondent for Fox News, would be his replacement. Hume also announced that he would remain with Fox News as a senior political analyst and regular panelist for the program Fox News Sunday.

On January 3, 2010, Hume on Fox News Sunday, advised embattled golfer Tiger Woods to convert to Christianity to attempt to end his problems. Hume's comments were made after the revelation of Woods' habitual adultery and the resulting deterioration of his relationship with his family.

==== On the Record (2016) ====
On September 6, 2016, Hume was named the anchor of On the Record after that show's longtime anchor, Greta Van Susteren, abruptly left Fox News. He served as the program's anchor through the end of the 2016 elections. Hume's first show as host of On the Record drew 2.4 million viewers, a double-digit increase over Van Susteren's average viewing audience in 2016. On November 4, 2016, it was announced that Tucker Carlson would host a new show in the former On the Record timeslot from November 14, 2016.

=== 2020 U.S. presidential election ===
In late May 2020, Hume criticized presumptive Democratic presidential nominee Joe Biden for wearing a face mask during the coronavirus pandemic while suggesting that it was positive for President Donald Trump to not wear one. In September 2020, Hume claimed that Biden was "senile".

Hume joined Chris Wallace, Juan Williams, and Dana Perino in Bret Baier and Martha MacCallum's election night coverage of the 2020 United States Presidential election on Fox News.

== Personal life ==
Hume is a conservative, remarking in 2006: "Sure, I'm a conservative, no doubt about it. But I would ask people to look at the work."

Hume is divorced from his first wife, Clare Jacobs Stoner. Their son, Sandy Hume, was a reporter for the newspaper The Hill and first publicized the story of the failed 1997 political attempt to replace Speaker of the House Newt Gingrich. In February 1998, Sandy Hume died by suicide. The National Press Club honors his memory with its annual Sandy Hume Memorial Award for Excellence in Political Journalism. Hume was baptized and confirmed in the Episcopal Church and has said that he committed his life to Jesus Christ "in a way that was very meaningful" to him in the aftermath of his son's suicide in 1998.

Brit Hume's daughter, Virginia Hume (born 1965), was a contributor to The Weekly Standard. She worked for 25 years as a public relations, political communications and traditional marketing professional. Her political experience includes serving as a deputy press secretary for the Republican National Committee in 1996.

In 1993, Hume married Kim Schiller, who was a Fox News vice president and Washington bureau chief before she retired in 2006.

== Awards and honors ==
- Emmy Award for coverage of the Gulf War (1991)
- American Journalism Review "Best in the Business" award (twice) for White House coverage
- Sol Taishoff Award for Excellence in Broadcast Journalism (2003)
- Writer of The Killing Ground (film), which was nominated for Academy Award for Best Documentary Feature

== Bibliography ==
- Death and the Mines – Rebellion and Murder in the United Mine Workers. New York: Grossman. 1971. ISBN 0-670-26105-X.
- Inside Story (1st ed.). Garden City, New York: Doubleday. 1974. ISBN 0-385-06526-4. (a memoir of his days working with columnist Jack Anderson)

Media offices
Preceded by Sam Donaldson	ABC News Chief White House Correspondent; 1989–1996	Succeeded by John Donvan
