= 2000 Portuguese regional elections =

The Portuguese Autonomous Regions of Azores and Madeira held their own Regional Legislative election of 2000 on October 15.

In the Azores, there were 52 seats in the Regional Parliament in dispute, the same of the previous election, in 1996. The seats were distributed by the 9 islands of the archipelago proportionally to the population of each island; however, each island is entitled to at least two members of parliament.

In Madeira, there were 61 seats in dispute, two more than in the previous election, distributed by the 11 municipalities of the archipelago proportionally to the population of each municipality.

The Socialist Party won the election in Azores for the second consecutive time, increasing the voting share by 3% to 49% of the voting and re-electing Carlos César to the presidency of the Regional Government. The Social Democrats lost many mandates, which made César achieve an absolute majority.

In Madeira, Alberto João Jardim, of the Social Democratic Party kept his dominance over the regional political panorama, winning the election with an absolute majority of 56%, losing only 1% of the voting and achieving the 7th consecutive absolute majority since the very first election in 1976. The two extra mandates were distributed by the People's Party and the People's Democratic Union.

== The election in Azores ==
The winner of the election was the Socialist Party, that for the second time achieved the majority of the voting, this time an absolute majority. Carlos Manuel Martins do Vale César was re-elected president of the Regional Government with a parliamentary support of 30 MPs out of 52.

The People's Party, despite raising the share of the voting by more than 2%, lost 1 MP, due to the application of the d'Hondt method by the 9 islands, the Social Democrats lost almost 10% of the voting and 6 MPs. The People's Monarchist Party, that hadn't participated in the previous election, ran in coalition with the Democratic Party of the Atlantic and didn't elect a single MP.

On the left, the Unitary Democratic Coalition, led by the Portuguese Communist Party raised the voting by 1% and achieved one more MP, elected in the island of Faial. The People's Democratic Union, after merging with several other small left-wing parties, ran inside the Leftwing Bloc and didn't manage to elect a single MP.

=== Summary of votes and seats ===
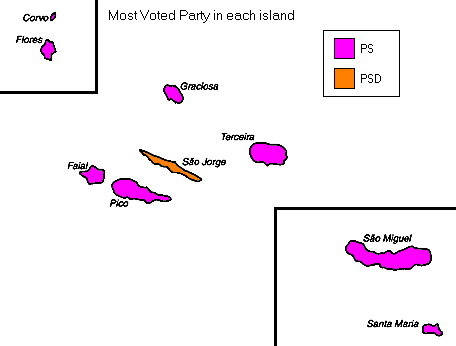
The most voted party in each island

Summary of the 15 October 2000 Legislative Assembly of Azores elections results
| Parties | Votes | % | ±pp swing | MPs | | | | | MPs %/ votes % |
| Parties | Votes | % | ±pp swing | 1996 | 2000 | ± | % | ± | MPs %/ votes % |
|---|---|---|---|---|---|---|---|---|---|
| PS | 49,438 | 49.20 | ▲3.4 | 24 | 30 | ▲6 | 57.69 | ▲11.5 | 1.17 |
| PSD | 32,642 | 32.48 | ▼8.5 | 24 | 18 | ▼6 | 34.62 | ▼11.5 | 1.07 |
| CDS–PP | 9,605 | 9.56 | ▲2.2 | 3 | 2 | ▼1 | 3.85 | ▼1.9 | 0.40 |
| CDU | 4,856 | 4.83 | ▲1.4 | 1 | 2 | ▲1 | 3.85 | ▲1.9 | 0.80 |
| BE | 1,387 | 1.38 | — | — | 0 | — | 0.00 | — | 0.0 |
| PPM / Democratic Party of the Atlantic | 799 | 0.80 | — | — | 0 | — | 0.00 | — | 0.0 |
| Total valid | 98,727 | 98.25 | ▼0.6 | 52 | 52 | 0 | 100.00 | 0.0 | — |
| Blank ballots | 895 | 0.89 | ▲0.3 | | | | | | |
| Invalid ballots | 862 | 0.86 | ▲0.3 | | | | | | |
| Total (turnout 53.30%) | 100,484 | 100.00 | ▼5.9 | | | | | | |
Source: Comissão Nacional de Eleições

== The election in Madeira ==
The winner of the election in Madeira was, once more, the Social Democratic Party, and Alberto João Jardim was elected president of the Regional Government with an absolute majority for the 7th consecutive time. The percentage gathered by the social democrats decreased by 1%, however, due to the increase of the overall number of MPs, the party kept their 41 mandates.

The People's Party increased its voting and its number of MPs, gathering a total of 3 mandates.

On the left, the Socialist Party kept its 13 MPs after, despite losing more than 3% of the voting. The Unitary Democratic Coalition, led by the Portuguese Communist Party, increased the voting and kept the 2 Mps of the previous election. The People's Democratic Union raised the number of MPs from 1 to 2 after a slight increase of the voting.

=== Summary of votes and seats ===
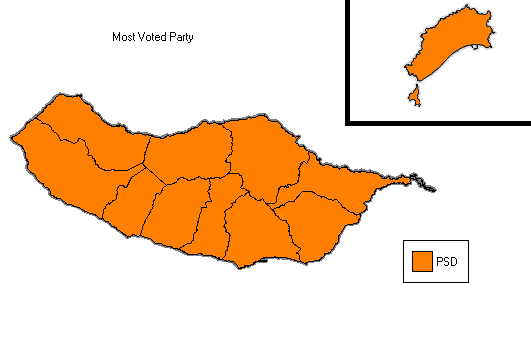
The most voted party in each municipality

Summary of the 15 October 2000 Legislative Assembly of Madeira elections results
| Parties | Votes | % | ±pp swing | MPs | | | | | MPs %/ votes % |
| Parties | Votes | % | ±pp swing | 1996 | 2000 | ± | % | ± | MPs %/ votes % |
|---|---|---|---|---|---|---|---|---|---|
| PSD | 72,588 | 55.95 | ▼0.9 | 41 | 41 | 0 | 67.21 | ▼2.3 | 1.20 |
| PS | 27,290 | 21.04 | ▼3.8 | 13 | 13 | 0 | 21.31 | ▼0.7 | 1.01 |
| CDS–PP | 12,612 | 9.72 | ▲2.4 | 2 | 3 | ▲1 | 4.92 | ▲1.5 | 0.51 |
| People's Democratic Union | 6,210 | 4.79 | ▲0.8 | 1 | 2 | ▲1 | 3.28 | ▲1.6 | 0.68 |
| CDU | 6,015 | 4.64 | ▲0.6 | 2 | 2 | 0 | 3.28 | ▼0.1 | 0.71 |
| National Solidarity Party | 2,243 | 1.73 | ▲1.1 | 0 | 0 | 0 | 0.00 | 0.0 | 0.0 |
| Total valid | 126,958 | 97.86 | ▼0.3 | 59 | 61 | ▲2 | 100.00 | 0.0 | — |
| Blank ballots | 1,136 | 0.88 | ▲0.2 | | | | | | |
| Invalid ballots | 1,640 | 1.26 | ▲0.2 | | | | | | |
| Total (turnout 61.91%) | 129,734 | 100.00 | ▼3.4 | | | | | | |
Source: Comissão Nacional de Eleições Archived 2012-05-16 at the Wayback Machine

== See also ==
- Azores
- Madeira
