= 2002 Solihull Metropolitan Borough Council election =

2002 UK local government election

(2000 ←) 2002 United Kingdom local elections (→ 2003)

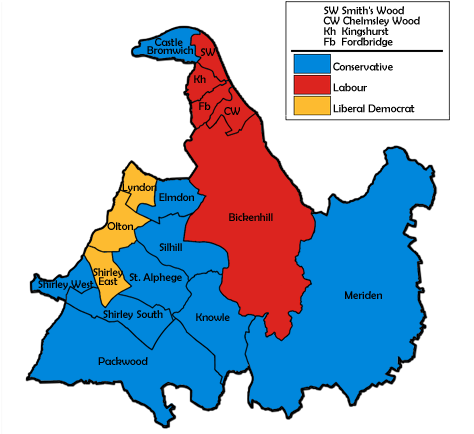
Map of the results for the 2002 Solihull council election.

The 2002 Solihull Metropolitan Borough Council election took place on 2 May 2002 to elect members of Solihull Metropolitan Borough Council in the West Midlands, England. One third of the council was up for election and the Conservative Party stayed in overall control of the council.

== Campaign ==
Before the election the Conservatives held 29 seats, compared to 14 for Labour and 8 for the Liberal Democrats, with 17 seats being contested in the election. The Conservatives had held a majority on the council since gaining 4 seats at the 2000 election.

Issues in the election included a proposed development by Asda in Shirley, the fate of the Accident and Emergency department at Solihull hospital and new housing developments. Labour also wanted to address a north-south divide in the council area and opposed any transfer of council housing from council control.

== Election result ==
The results saw the Conservatives stay in control of the council with 29 of the 51 seats after only 2 seats changed parties. A couple of former councillors returned to the council, the former Labour leader of the council Michael Corser in Chelmsley Wood and Liberal Democrat June Gandy in Shirley East.

Solihull local election result 2002
Party	Seats	Gains	Losses	Net gain/loss	Seats %	Votes %	Votes	+/−
Conservative	9	1	1	0	52.9	49.2	24,309	-9.7%
Labour	5	0	1	-1	29.4	23.7	11,741	+5.5%
Liberal Democrats	3	1	0	+1	17.6	27.1	13,390	+4.5%

This result had the following consequences for the total number of seats on the council after the elections :

Party	Previous council	New council
Conservatives	29	29
Labour	14	13
Liberal Democrat	8	9
Total	51	51
Working majority	7	7

== Ward results ==
Bickenhill
Party	Candidate	Votes	%	±%
Labour	Jim Ryan	2,013	54.2	+27.0
Conservative	Joan Allsopp	1,491	40.1	−25.9
Liberal Democrats	Douglas Hogg	210	5.7	−1.1
Majority		522	14.1	−24.7
Turnout		3,714	35.7	+4.2
Labour hold		Swing	+26.4	

Castle Bromwich
Party	Candidate	Votes	%	±%
Conservative	Beryl Kellie	1,940	65.4	−9.3
Labour	James Moore	722	24.3	+6.3
Liberal Democrats	John Knight	306	10.3	+3.0
Majority		1,218	41.0	−15.7
Turnout		2,968	31.8	+1.4
Conservative hold		Swing	-7.8	

Chelmsley Wood
Party	Candidate	Votes	%	±%
Labour	Michael Corser	900	62.2	+8.4
Conservative	Robert Courts	350	24.2	−9.2
Liberal Democrats	Bernard Wright	197	13.6	+0.9
Majority		550	38.0	+17.6
Turnout		1,447	19.6	+4.1
Labour hold		Swing	+8.8	

Elmdon
Party	Candidate	Votes	%	±%
Conservative	Kenneth Hawkins	1,330	44.7	−13.3
Labour	Sheila Brookes	1,221	41.1	+5.8
Liberal Democrats	Barbara Harber	423	14.2	+7.4
Majority		109	3.7	−19.0
Turnout		2,974	37.7	−0.5
Conservative gain from Labour		Swing	-9.5	

Fordbridge
Party	Candidate	Votes	%	±%
Labour	Jacqueline Moore	722	61.3	+12.6
Conservative	Michael Robinson	314	26.7	−8.9
Liberal Democrats	Christopher Hayes	142	12.1	−3.5
Majority		408	34.6	+21.5
Turnout		1,178	19.8	+5.2
Labour hold		Swing	+10.7	

Kingshurst
Party	Candidate	Votes	%	±%
Labour	Jeffrey Potts	830	63.3	+16.5
Conservative	Graham Juniper	351	26.8	−7.3
Liberal Democrats	Jennifer Wright	131	10.0	+3.1
Majority		479	36.5	+23.8
Turnout		1,312	23.8	+0.9
Labour hold		Swing	+11.9	

Knowle
Party	Candidate	Votes	%	±%
Conservative	Diana Holl-Allen	2,106	65.3	−8.1
Liberal Democrats	Nigel Dyer	693	21.5	+5.1
Labour	Patricia Harrop	427	13.2	+3.0
Majority		1,413	43.8	−13.3
Turnout		3,226	36.9	+1.6
Conservative hold		Swing	-6.6	

Lyndon
Party	Candidate	Votes	%	±%
Liberal Democrats	Robert Reeves	1,583	65.4	+7.2
Conservative	Gary Allport	478	19.7	−9.1
Labour	Catherine Connan	360	14.9	+1.9
Majority		1,105	45.6	+16.3
Turnout		2,421	31.8	+3.2
Liberal Democrats hold		Swing	+8.1	

Meriden
Party	Candidate	Votes	%	±%
Conservative	Peter Lea	2,369	69.6	+0.6
Labour	Jonathan Maltman	561	16.5	−0.5
Liberal Democrats	Peter Whitlock	475	14.0	+0.0
Majority		1,808	53.1	+1.1
Turnout		3,405	36.0	+3.7
Conservative hold		Swing	+0.5	

Olton
Party	Candidate	Votes	%	±%
Liberal Democrats	John Windmill	2,192	61.8	+11.0
Conservative	Patricia Handslip	1,078	30.4	−12.3
Labour	Eric Collins	277	7.8	+1.3
Majority		1,114	31.4	+23.2
Turnout		3,547	38.6	+2.7
Liberal Democrats hold		Swing	+11.6	

Packwood
Party	Candidate	Votes	%	±%
Conservative	Kenneth Meeson	2,627	60.7	+4.6
Liberal Democrats	Eric Widger	1,417	32.8	−6.3
Labour	Florence Nash	281	6.5	+1.6
Majority		1,210	28.0	+11.0
Turnout		4,325	37.9	−3.2
Conservative hold		Swing	+5.4	

Shirley East
Party	Candidate	Votes	%	±%
Liberal Democrats	June Gandy	2,028	57.1	+14.2
Conservative	Brian Burgess	1,242	35.0	−16.3
Labour	Kevin Raven	279	7.9	+2.1
Majority		786	22.1	+13.7
Turnout		3,549	39.1	+0.1
Liberal Democrats gain from Conservative		Swing	+15.2	

Shirley South
Party	Candidate	Votes	%	±%
Conservative	David Evans	2,023	54.3	−13.0
Liberal Democrats	Roger Gemmell	1,031	27.7	+13.2
Labour	Barney McElholm	673	18.1	+0.0
Majority		992	26.6	−22.6
Turnout		3,727	28.7	+2.5
Conservative hold		Swing	-13.1	

Shirley West
Party	Candidate	Votes	%	±%
Conservative	Richard Lewis	1,487	54.1	−8.9
Labour	Arthur Harper	681	24.8	+1.9
Liberal Democrats	Anthony Verduyn	581	21.1	+7.0
Majority		806	29.3	−10.7
Turnout		2,749	30.4	+0.9
Conservative hold		Swing	-5.4	

Silhill
Party	Candidate	Votes	%	±%
Conservative	Sheila Pittaway	2,145	61.7	−6.0
Liberal Democrats	Brenda Chapple	819	23.5	+3.3
Labour	Marcus Bennion	514	14.8	+2.7
Majority		1,326	38.1	−9.5
Turnout		3,478	35.3	+1.6
Conservative hold		Swing	-4.6	

Smith's Wood
Party	Candidate	Votes	%	±%
Labour	Hugh Hendry	887	65.1	+10.1
Conservative	Daniel Kettle	297	21.8	−11.0
Liberal Democrats	Keith Brown	179	13.1	+0.8
Majority		590	43.3	+21.3
Turnout		1,363	18.4	+3.9
Labour hold		Swing	+10.5	

St Alphege
Party	Candidate	Votes	%	±%
Conservative	Kathleen Wild	2,681	66.1	−8.6
Liberal Democrats	Christine Reeves	983	24.2	+8.2
Labour	James Burman	393	9.7	+0.4
Majority		1,698	41.9	−16.9
Turnout		4,057	37.1	+2.6
Conservative hold		Swing	-8.4	

== By-elections between 2002 and 2003 ==
Shirley West by-election 13 March 2003
Party	Candidate	Votes	%	±%
Liberal Democrats	Howard Allen	1,179	54.9	+33.8
Conservative	Joan Allsopp	777	36.2	−17.9
Labour	Arthur Harper	192	8.9	−15.9
Majority		402	18.7	−10.6
Turnout		2,148	23.8	−6.6
Liberal Democrats gain from Conservative		Swing	+25.8	
