= 2000 Somali presidential election =

Indirect elections for Somali president

- 26 August 2000
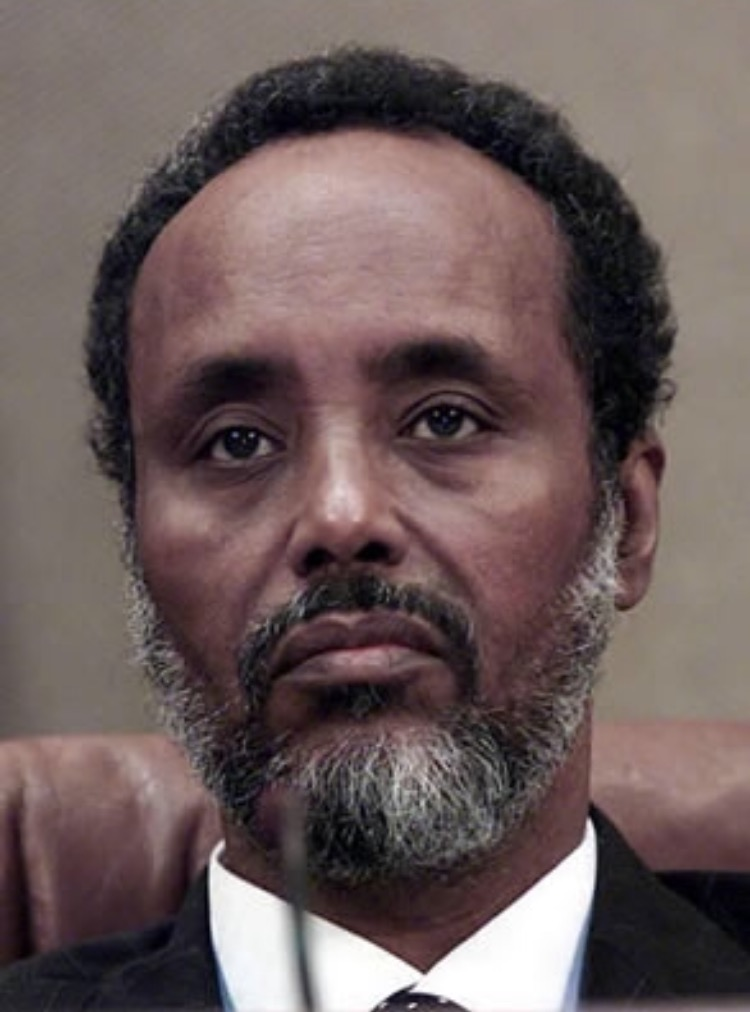

| Nominee | Abdiqasim Salad Hassan | Abdullahi Ahmed Addow |
| Party | Independent | Independent |
| Electoral vote | 145 | 92 |
President before election
Ali Mahdi Muhammad
United Somali Congress
Elected President
Abdiqasim Salad Hassan
Independent

The 2000 Somali presidential election was an indirect presidential election was for the Transitional National Government of Somalia held in Djibouti on 26 August 2000.

The election was conducted by the 245 members of Transitional National Assembly, Somalia's interim parliament established earlier that year at the Somali National Reconciliation Conference. Abdiqasim Salad Hassan, was elected as the 5th President of Somalia for a 3 year term, after 3 rounds of voting. The election was met with widespread optimism and jubilation in Mogadishu.

== Results ==
| Candidate | First round | | Second round | | Third round | |
| Candidate | Votes | % | Votes | % | Votes | % |
|---|---|---|---|---|---|---|
| Abdiqasim Salad | 78 | 33.19 | 124 | 52.54 | 145 | 61.18 |
| Abdullahi Ahmed Addow | 83 | 35.32 | 110 | 46.61 | 92 | 38.82 |
| Ali Khalif Galaydh | 35 | 14.89 | 2 | 0.85 | | |
| Ali Mahdi Muhammad | 12 | 5.11 | | | | |
| Others | 27 | 11.49 | | | | |
| Total | 235 | 100.00 | 236 | 100.00 | 237 | 100.00 |
Source: Goobjoog

== Aftermath ==
Despite the initial optimism, Abdiqasim's government never controlled much territory beyond the capital, Mogadishu, in large part due Ethiopian backing of a coalition of warlords opposed to the TNG. Experts argue that Ethiopia's rejection of the TNG was motivated by the fear of a strong Somali state, not dependent on Addis Ababa, which could reignite tension in Ethiopia's Somali-majority Ogaden region. Ethiopia eventually succeeded deposing the TNG after the Embagathi accords that led to the formation of the Transitional Federal Government (TFG) in 2004 and the presidency Ethiopia's favored candidate Abdullahi Yusuf, on the grounds that he would give up Somalia's long standing claim to the Ogaden.
