= Kerry Sacilotto =

Australian politician

Kerry Denise Sacilotto (born 21 May 1972) is a former Australian politician. She was the Labor member for Port Darwin in the Northern Territory Legislative Assembly from 2005 to 2008. She held the positions of Deputy Speaker, Chairman of Committees, Chairman of the Select Parliamentary committee of Youth & Sport.

Northern Territory Legislative Assembly
Years	Term	Electoral division	Party
2005–2008	10th	Port Darwin	Labor

Sacilotto owned Professionals Darwin and had worked in Residential & Commercial real estate prior to her political career, and was also Vice President of the REINT. Sacilotto was one of the surprise victors of Labor's 2005 landslide election win, defeating the Country Liberal Party incumbent Sue Carter. Although Carter had suffered a 10-point swing in 2001, there was little hint that she was in any serious danger of losing what had long been the safest CLP seat in Darwin. However, in a shock result, the count remained on a knife-edge for several days after the election. On the final count, Sacilotto unseated Carter by 73 votes on a swing of 8.4 percent, just barely enough to take the seat off the CLP. She actually won just enough primary votes to win the seat outright—to date, the only time Labor has done so.

She served one term in the Assembly before John Elferink regained Port Darwin for the CLP.

Northern Territory Legislative Assembly
Preceded by Sue Carter	Member for Port Darwin; 2005–2008	Succeeded by John Elferink
