= 2000 United States Senate election in West Virginia =

- November 7, 2000
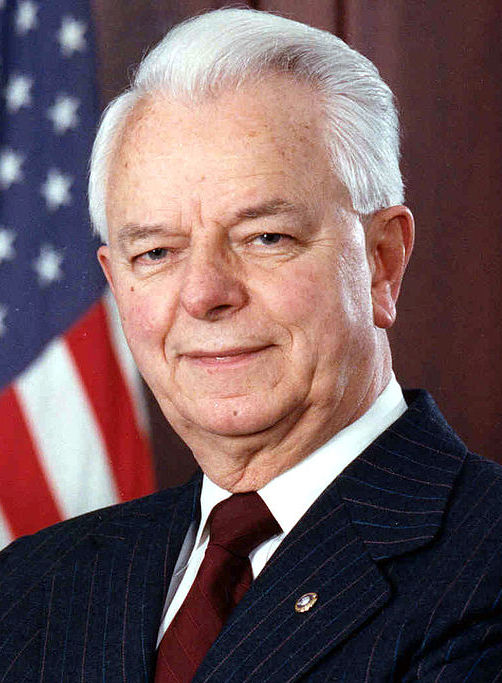

Nominee	Robert Byrd	David Gallaher
Party	Democratic	Republican
Popular vote	469,215	121,635
Percentage	77.75%	20.16%
- County results Byrd: 60–70% 70–80% 80–90%
U.S. senator before election
Robert Byrd
Democratic
Elected U.S. Senator
Robert Byrd
Democratic

The 2000 United States Senate election in West Virginia took place on November 7, 2000. Incumbent Democratic U.S. Senator Robert Byrd won re-election to an eighth term. He won every county and congressional district in the state with at least 60% of the vote despite Republican presidential candidate George W. Bush winning the state on the same ballot.

Byrd would go on to become the longest serving U.S. senator in the history of the United States Senate at the end of this term, surpassing Strom Thurmond. He would additionally be re-elected one further time.

== Major candidates ==
=== Democratic ===
- Robert Byrd, incumbent U.S. Senator

=== Republican ===
- David T. Gallaher, contractor

== Results ==
West Virginia United States Senate election, 2000
Party	Candidate	Votes	%
Democratic	Robert Byrd (incumbent)	469,215	77.75%
Republican	David T. Gallaher	121,635	20.16%
Libertarian	Joe Whelan	12,627	2.09%
Majority		347,580	57.60%
Turnout		603,477	100.00%
Democratic hold			

== See also ==
- 2000 United States Senate elections
