= Sue Carter =

Australian politician (born 1956)

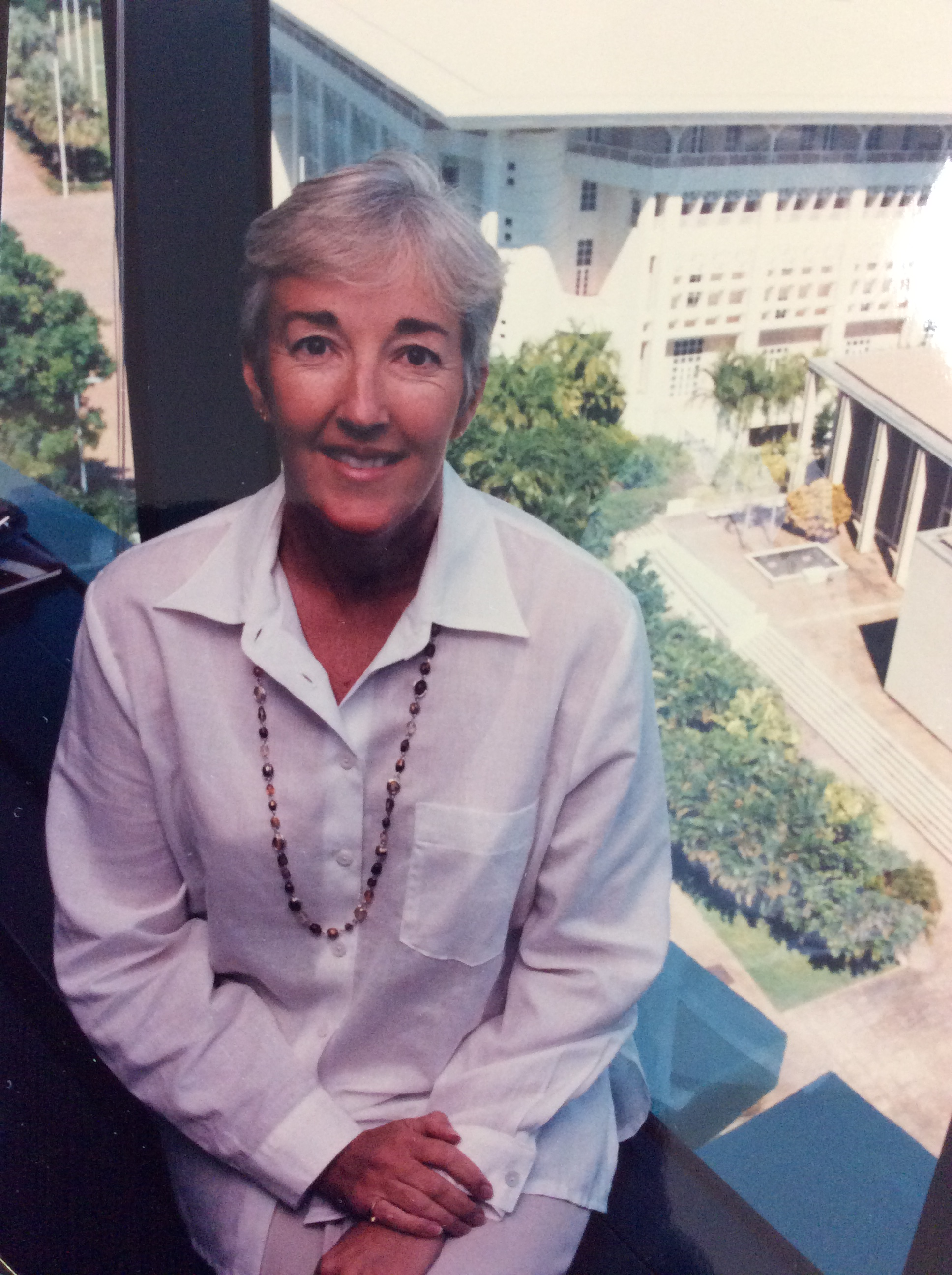
- Carter in 2016

Member of the Northern Territory Legislative Assembly for Port Darwin
- In office 11 March 2000 – 18 June 2005
- Preceded by: Shane Stone
- Succeeded by: Kerry Sacilotto

Personal details
- Born: Susan Jill Carter; 1956 (age 69–70)
- Party: Country Liberal
- Education: Northern Territory University
- Occupation: Nurse

Susan Jill Carter (born 1956) is an Australian politician. She was a Country Liberal Party member of the Northern Territory Legislative Assembly from 2000 to 2005, representing the central Darwin electorate of Port Darwin. After winning a by-election upon the resignation of former Chief Minister Shane Stone, Carter served as Opposition Whip and Shadow Minister for Health, and was briefly touted as a leadership aspirant before being unexpectedly defeated at the 2005 election.

== Early life ==
Carter spent her childhood living in a number of locations across Australia, due to her father's position in the Royal Australian Air Force. She studied nursing, and subsequently moved to Darwin in 1979, gaining a position at the hospital there. She studied teaching at the Northern Territory University some years later, and went on to work as an adult educator, teaching in health-related areas in both Darwin and Katherine. Carter later served as Convenor of the Northern Territory Women's Advisory Council to the Chief Minister, Marshall Perron from 1993 to 1995, before going on to work as an investigator for the Health and Community Services Complaints Commission.

== Political career ==
In February 2000, former Chief Minister Shane Stone resigned from parliament, causing a by-election in his safe CLP seat of Port Darwin. Carter won preselection to contest the seat for the CLP. Although the by-election came at a bad time for the CLP government, Carter easily retained the seat in a quiet campaign where Stone's mandatory sentencing policies were the major issue. She was appointed Deputy Chairman of Committees upon entering parliament, which saw her serve in the Speaker's absence.

Northern Territory Legislative Assembly
Years	Term	Electoral division	Party
2000–2001	8th	Port Darwin	Country Liberal
2001–2005	9th	Port Darwin	Country Liberal

Carter was re-elected at the 2001 election, though she suffered a 10-point swing. She not only had to fend off a Labor challenger, but former CLP stalwart and former territory minister Nick Dondas, who ran as an independent. Labor narrowly won government at this election due in part to significant gains in Darwin; Carter was the only CLP member west of Palmerston, and the only CLP member in the capital. She was promoted to Opposition Whip upon her re-election, and was again promoted in December 2002, when she was appointed Shadow Minister for Health, Senior Territorians, Arts, and Museums. This left her handling the opposition's response in one of the most difficult portfolios in the Northern Territory, with health being a serious and ongoing issue for the territory government.

Carter supported Terry Mills in both his unsuccessful challenge to Opposition Leader Denis Burke in June 2003, and his successful challenge that November. However, in October 2004 she was demoted, with Mills assigning her health portfolio to Jodeen Carney. She was regarded as an outside chance for the CLP leadership when Mills resigned in February 2005, but she allowed Burke to regain the leadership uncontested.

Carter was widely expected to win a third term in office at the 2005 election. However, an unexpectedly large victory by the Labor government saw an extremely close result in Port Darwin. The result was not known for several days. Ultimately, Labor candidate Kerry Sacilotto emerged the victor by 73 votes to become the first Labor member to win Port Darwin. Sacilotto actually won enough primary votes to defeat Carter without the need for preferences.

== After politics ==
In 2008, Carter returned to her home town of the Gold Coast, after nearly 30 years in the NT, where she now works as a registered nurse.

Northern Territory Legislative Assembly
Preceded by Shane Stone	Member for Port Darwin; 2000–2005	Succeeded by Kerry Sacilotto
