= 2000 Mole Valley District Council election =

2000 UK local government election

Elections to Mole Valley Council were held on 4 May 2000. The whole council was up for election with boundary changes since the last election in 1999. The council stayed under no overall control.

== Election result ==
Mole Valley local election result 2000
Party	Seats	Gains	Losses	Net gain/loss	Seats %	Votes %	Votes	+/−
Conservative	19			+2	46.3			
Liberal Democrats	14			-2	34.1			
Independent	7			0	17.1			
Labour	1			0	2.4			
