= Paul Kirby =

Australian politician (born 1966)

The Honourable Paul Kirby

Member of the Northern Territory Legislative Assembly for Port Darwin
- In office 27 August 2016 – 24 August 2024
- Preceded by: John Elferink
- Succeeded by: Robyn Cahill

Personal details
- Born: 27 February 1966 (age 60)
- Party: Labor Party
- Occupation: Trade union organiser

Paul Andrew Kirby (born 27 February 1966) is an Australian politician. He was the Labor member for Port Darwin in the Northern Territory Legislative Assembly from 2016 to 2024.

== Early life and career ==
Kirby was the Northern Territory Organiser for the Electrical Trades Union of Australia Queensland and NT Branch before entering politics.

== Politics ==
Northern Territory Legislative Assembly
Years	Term	Electoral division	Party
2016–2020	13th	Port Darwin	Labor
2020–2024	14th	Port Darwin	Labor

Kirby was preselected as the Labor candidate for Port Darwin ahead of the 2016 Territory election. The seat's incumbent, John Elferink of the Country Liberal Party, was retiring. Port Darwin had historically been a CLP stronghold, having been in that party's hands for all but two terms of its entire existence. Labor had only won it once, and only on a knife-edge, during its 2005 landslide. Going into the 2016 election, Port Darwin had a notional CLP majority of 9.7 percent after the redistribution, which would have made it a fairly safe CLP seat under normal circumstances.

However, the CLP had been sinking in the polls for some time, particularly in the Darwin area. Additionally, it no longer had the advantage of Elferink's incumbency. On election night, the CLP lost over 19 percent of its primary vote from 2012 amid its near-total meltdown in the capital. This allowed Kirby to take the seat on a swing of 12.5 percent, becoming only the second Labor member ever to win it. He was reelected in 2020, becoming the first Labor MP to win a second term in Port Darwin.

Kirby was appointed to the cabinet after the 2020 election with the portfolios of Small Business, Jobs and Training, Corporate and Digital Development, Public Employment, Veterans Affairs and Recreational Fishing.

He stood down at the 2024 Northern Territory general election. He was granted the title '''The Honourable ''' for life by the Governor-General on 31 March 2026.

Northern Territory Legislative Assembly
Preceded by John Elferink	Member for Port Darwin; 2016–2024	Succeeded by Robyn Cahill
Political offices
Preceded by Ken Vowles	Minister for Primary Industry and Resources; 2019–2020	Abolished
