= 2000 Missouri Democratic presidential primary =

- March 7, 2000

92 delegates to the Democratic National Convention (75 pledged, 17 unpledged) The number of pledged delegates received is determined by the popular vote

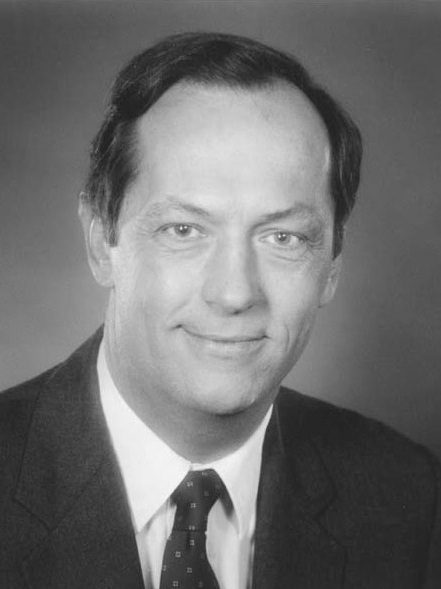
Candidate	Al Gore	Bill Bradley
Home state	Tennessee	New Jersey
Delegate count	51	24
Popular vote	171,562	89,092
Percentage	64.62%	33.56%
- County results Gore: 50–60% 60–70% 70–80% 80–90% Bradley: 50–60%

The 2000 Missouri Democratic presidential primary took place on March 7, 2000, as one of 15 states and one territory holding primaries on the same day, known as Super Tuesday, in the Democratic Party primaries for the 2000 presidential election. The Missouri primary was an open primary, with the state awarding 92 delegates towards the 2000 Democratic National Convention, of which 75 were pledged delegates allocated on the basis of the results of the primary.

Vice president Al Gore had won the primary by a landslide, taking around 64% of the vote, winning every county in the state but Jefferson and Ste. Genevieve, and gaining 51 delegates, while senator Bill Bradley received almost 34% of the vote and 24 delegates. Jefferson County is the site of Crystal City, where Bradley was born and raised.

== Procedure ==
Missouri was one of 15 states and one territory holding primaries on Super Tuesday.

Voting took place throughout the state from 6:00 a.m. until 7:00 p.m. In the open primary, candidates had to meet a threshold of 15 percent at the congressional district or statewide level in order to be considered viable. The 75 pledged delegates to the 2000 Democratic National Convention were allocated proportionally on the basis of the results of the primary. Of these, between five and six were allocated to each of the state's eight congressional districts and another nine were allocated to party leaders and elected officials (PLEO delegates), in addition to 15 at-large delegates.

Following ward, township, legislative district, and county mass meetings on March 30, 2000, during which district and state convention delegates were designated, district conventions on April 27, 2000, chose national convention district delegates. At the meeting of the Democratic state committee on May 6, 2000, the nine pledged PLEO delegates were voted on, while the 15 pledged at-large delegates were selected at the subsequent state convention on May 13, 2000. The delegation also included 15 unpledged PLEO delegates: nine members of the Democratic National Committee, five representatives from Congress (Bill Clay, Dick Gephardt, Ike Skelton, Karen McCarthy, and Pat Danner), the governor Mel Carnahan, and two add-ons.

Pledged national convention delegates
Type	Del.
CD1	6
CD2	6
CD3	6
CD4	5
CD5	6
CD6	5
CD7	5
CD8	5
CD9	5
PLEO	10
At-large	16
Total pledged delegates	75

== Candidates ==
The following candidates appeared on the ballot:

- Al Gore
- Bill Bradley
- Lyndon LaRouche, Jr.
- Pat Price

There was also an uncommitted option.

== Results ==
2000 Missouri Democratic presidential primary
Candidate	Votes	%	Delegates
Al Gore	171,562	64.62	51
Bill Bradley	89,092	33.56	24
Uncommitted	3,364	1.27	
Lyndon LaRouche, Jr.	906	0.34	
Pat Price	565	0.21	
Unallocated	-	-	17
Total	265,489	100%	92

== See also ==
- 2000 Missouri Republican presidential primary
- 2000 Democratic Party presidential primaries
