= 2000 Missouri Republican presidential primary =

- March 7, 2000
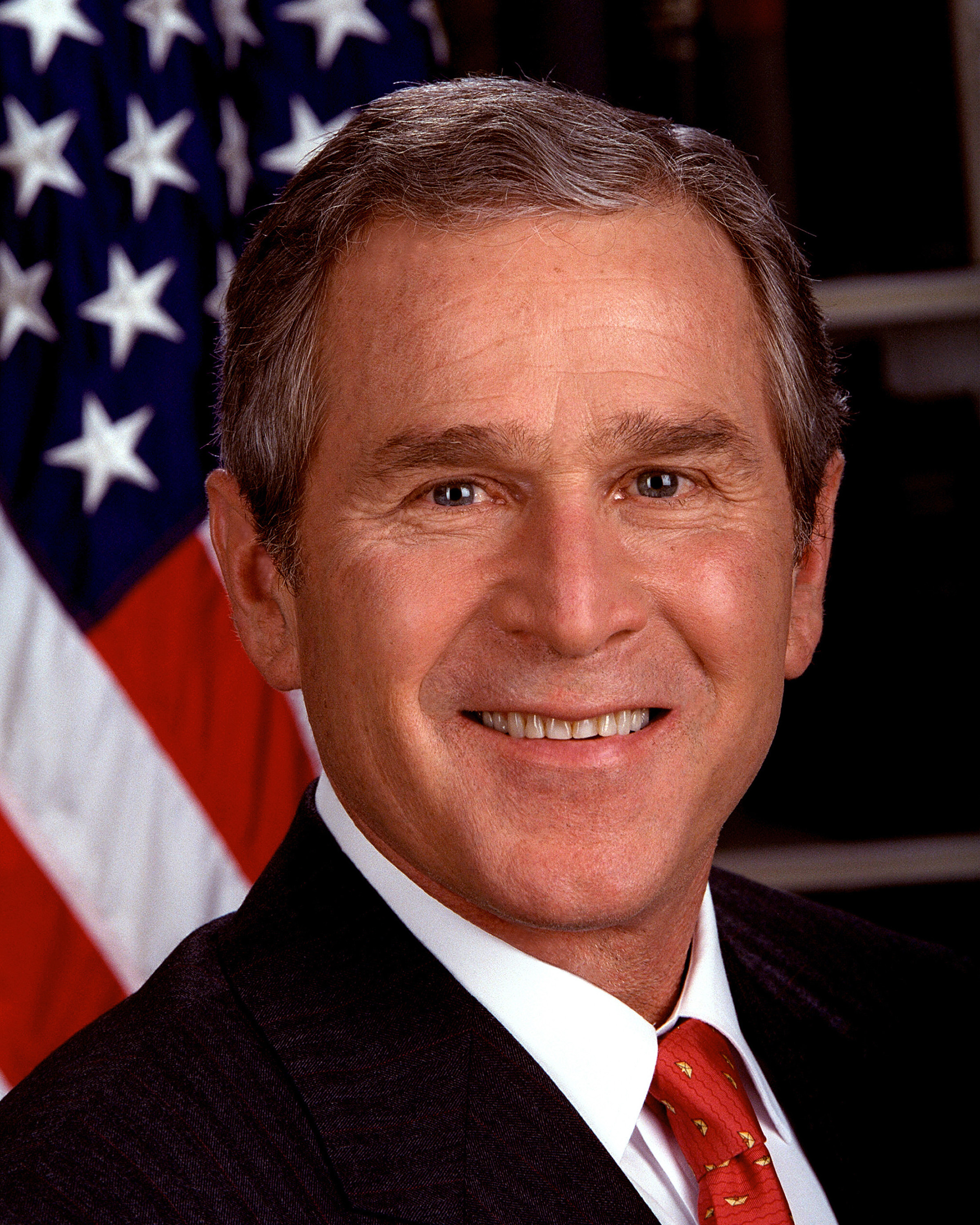

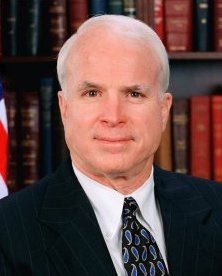

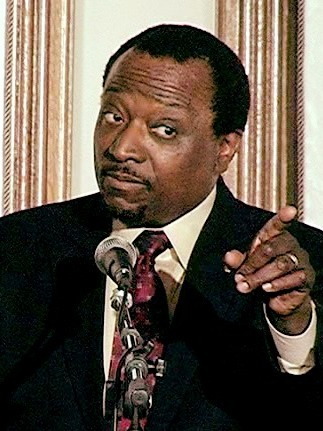
Candidate	George W. Bush	John McCain	Alan Keyes
Home state	Texas	Arizona	Maryland
Delegate count	35	0	0
Popular vote	275,366	167,831	27,282
Percentage	58%	35%	6%

The 2000 Missouri Republican presidential primary on March 7, 2000, determined the recipient of the state's 35 delegates to the Republican National Convention in the process to elect the 43rd president of the United States. It was an open primary. The primary marked the end of Missouri's use of the caucus system, which it had used almost exclusively until 2000. Missouri's primary was held on Super Tuesday, alongside fifteen other states.

== Results ==
Candidate	Votes	Percentage	Delegates
George W. Bush	275,366	58%	35
John McCain	167,831	35%	
Alan Keyes	27,282	6%	
Steve Forbes	2,044	0%	
Uncommitted	1,345	0%	
Gary Bauer	1,038	0%	
Orrin Hatch	363	0%	
Lawrence Hornung	94	0%	
Total	475,363	100%	35

== See also ==
- 2000 Missouri Democratic presidential primary
