= Robyn Cahill =

Australian politician

Robyn Cahill OAM
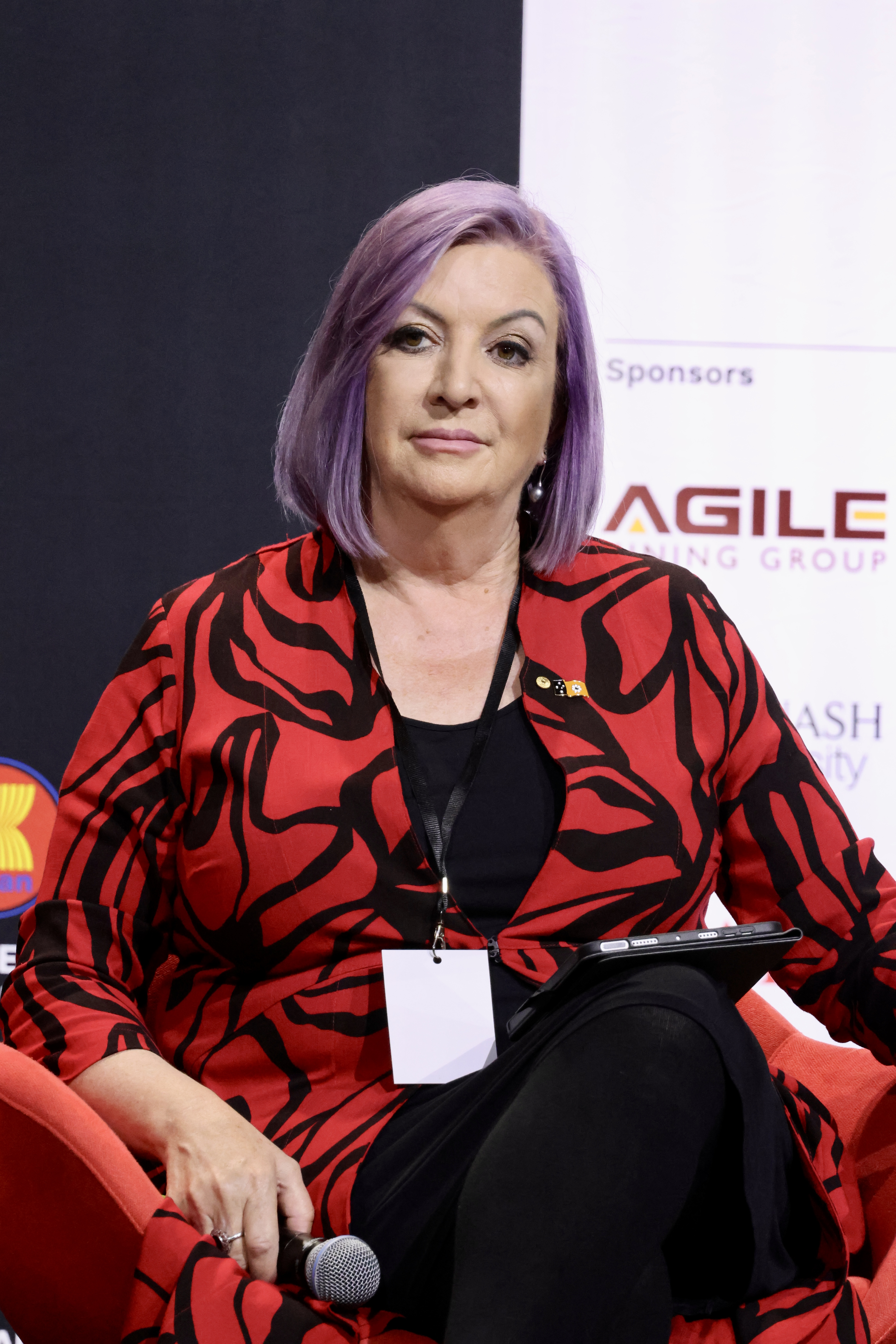
- Cahill in 2025

Member of the Northern Territory Legislative Assembly for Port Darwin
- Incumbent
- Assumed office 24 August 2024
- Preceded by: Paul Kirby

Personal details
- Party: Country Liberal Party
- Robyn Cahill's voice Cahill speaking about the green economy Recorded 26 August 2025

Robyn Cahill is an Australian politician from the Country Liberal Party.

== Biography ==
Cahill was an unsuccessful candidate for the CLP in the 2001 Northern Territory general election in Wanguri. Cahill is a former director of the Australian Medical Association. She is also the director of the Darwin Private Hospital and the GP superclinic, and chairs the NT Cancer Council. In the 2023 King's Birthday Honours she was awarded Medal of the Order of Australia for service to community health. In the 2024 Northern Territory general election, she was elected to the Northern Territory Legislative Assembly for Port Darwin. On 9 September 2024, she was appointed to the Finocchiaro ministry as a government minister. In July 2026, Cahill made the scientifically false claim that rainfall in the Northern Territory could alter the Earth's axis and polarity, as an argument in favour of allowing data centers to use aquifer water.

Northern Territory Legislative Assembly
Preceded by Paul Kirby	Member for Port Darwin; 2024–present	Incumbent
