= John Elferink =

Australian politician

The Honourable John Elferink
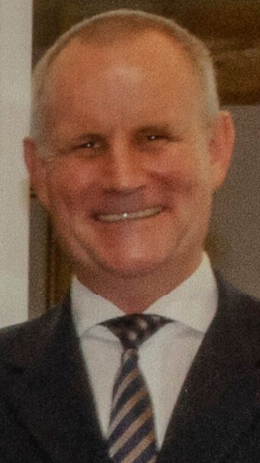
- Elferink in 2015

Member of the Northern Territory Parliament for Port Darwin
- In office 9 August 2008 – 8 August 2016
- Preceded by: Kerry Sacilotto
- Succeeded by: Paul Kirby

Member of the Northern Territory Parliament for MacDonnell
- In office 30 August 1997 – 18 June 2005
- Preceded by: Neil Bell
- Succeeded by: Alison Anderson

Personal details
- Born: Johan Wessel Elferink; 24 September 1965 (age 61) Netherlands
- Party: Country Liberal Party
- Spouse: Dee Elferink
- Children: Two
- Education: Monash University; University of New England
- Occupation: Police officer

Johan Wessel Elferink (born 24 September 1965) is an Australian politician. He is a former member of the Northern Territory Legislative Assembly for the Country Liberal Party.

== Early life ==
Elferink was born in the Netherlands and moved to Australia with his parents and older siblings as a three-year-old in 1968. His family settled in Darwin, and he subsequently graduated from Casuarina High School.

In 1983, Elferink joined the Northern Territory Police as a cadet. He subsequently rose to the rank of Sergeant (Qualified to Senior Sergeant), and served in both Darwin and Alice Springs. Elferink's career in the NT Police Force was not without incident. In an article in the NT News, he admitted turning up to work so drunk he couldn't fill in routine forms and to crawling round the Darwin Casino roof space.

While in the police force, he graduated with a Bachelor of Arts from Monash University in 1997, completing the course by distance education. In 2008 Elferink graduated with a Bachelor of Laws from the University of New England. He was admitted to the bar in October 2009.

== Political career ==
In 1997, Elferink won Country Liberal preselection for the rural electorate of MacDonnell after incumbent Labor member Neil Bell announced his retirement. On paper, Elferink faced daunting odds; the ALP held the seat with a majority of 16 points. However, the ALP preselected union organiser Mark Wheeler, thus prompting indigenous leader Kenneth Lechleitner to run as an independent and direct his preferences to the CLP. Elferink picked up enough of Leichleitner's preferences to take the seat on a swing of 18.7 percent. Although a redistribution ahead of the 2001 election erased Elferink's majority and made Macdonnell a notional Labor seat, Elferink was re-elected even as a massive swing to Labor across the Territory allowed it to win government for the first time. He served in the Shadow Ministry under Opposition Leaders Denis Burke and Terry Mills.

Northern Territory Legislative Assembly
Years	Term	Electoral division	Party
1997–2001	8th	MacDonnell	Country Liberal
2001–2005	9th	MacDonnell	Country Liberal
2008–2012	11th	Port Darwin	Country Liberal
2012–2016	12th	Port Darwin	Country Liberal

Elferink became an increasingly prominent member of the shadow ministry during his first two years in a portfolio. However, by early 2003, Elferink became increasingly frustrated with Burke's leadership who was struggling to maintain his grip on the party at the time. In June 2003, Elferink resigned as Shadow Minister for Local Government and Indigenous Affairs and publicly slammed Burke's leadership, labelling him "arrogant" and calling for him to be replaced by rival Mills.

He later returned to the shadow ministry in September, taking on the portfolio of Police, Fire and Emergency Services.

By late 2004, Elferink was once again becoming a key member of the parliamentary party, and this was reflected when, on 12 October, he was made Opposition Whip. Elferink was subsequently rewarded for this support, being made Leader of Opposition Business and Shadow Minister for Community Development, Housing, Local Government, Sport and Recreation, Regional Development and Indigenous Affairs, while maintaining the position of Whip. Elferink stood for re-election at the 2005 election. However, facing star candidate and indigenous activist Alison Anderson, Elferink was heavily defeated, suffering a two-party swing of 20.6 percent. He later served as party director for the CLP.

In the years between his occupation of a seat in parliament, Elferink occasionally worked for the Centre for Democratic Institutions in the Pacific on a number of occasions. Working to help improve the democracies of Fiji and the Solomon Islands.

Elferink contested the seat of Port Darwin at 9 August 2008 Legislative Assembly general election, and defeated Labor Party incumbent Kerry Sacilotto. In opposition, he held the Shadow portfolios of Shadow Treasurer, Shadow Minister for Public Employment, Shadow Minister for Essential Services as well as being the Leader of Opposition Business in the Territory Assembly.

When the CLP won the 2012 Northern Territory election, Elferink was made a minister in the Mills Ministry: Attorney-General and Minister for Justice, and Minister for Correctional Services. On 6 March, he was given the additional portfolios of Treasurer and Corporate and Information Services. For two years, he served in cabinet alongside Anderson, who crossed the floor to the CLP in 2011, but was dropped from the cabinet in 2013.

Elferink had courted controversy on a number of occasions with his hands on approach to involving himself in domestic violence occurrences being facetiously labelled "Captain Justice", by local press because of his propensity to personally intervene in domestic violence incidents when they occurred, on one occasion being assaulted himself in defence of domestic violence victim.

As Attorney General Elferink also embarked on an ambitious campaign of court reform in the Territory culminating in the abolition of the Magistrates Court and the effective introduction of a three tier court system in the Northern Territory giving quazi-judicial powers to the NT Civil Appeals Tribunal. These steps were welcomed by few in the legal fraternity of the Northern Territory. Further reforms included the construction of the new Supreme Court Building in Alice Springs and the introduction of the Children's Court in Darwin.

Further components of Elferink's Attorney Generalship included his personal drafting of the Pillars of Justice reform package. These changes were the most fundamental shake up of the Department of Justice and Attorney General since self-government, putting the structures in place that were necessary to form the basis of the future course of the justice system in the Northern Territory.

Elferink also introduced "No Body No Parole" laws in the NT, which prevents a convicted murderer from receiving parole when that murderer refused to identify the location of the body to authorities. An example of this in the Northern Territory was Bradley John Murdoch, who had been convicted of the murder of Peter Falconio but never revealed the location of the body.

Elferink also introduced controversial 'paperless arrest' laws that saw a substantial fall in the number of assaults occurring in the Darwin CBD. The laws were challenged in the High Court of Australia with the court ruling that the laws were not punitive in nature and were lawful. Throughout his time in parliament Elferink remained a strident critic of passive welfare and its effects. The paperless arrest system was in part a response to the negative impact and overwhelming anti-social behaviour which plagued the Northern Territory.

As Health Minister Elferink was tasked with commencing the long delayed Palmerston Hospital. Shortly after taking the portfolio Elferink had brought the Territory Government to a position where the Hospital was commenced under Elferink's stewardship.

Mental Health issues also were of deep concern to Elferink who took a number of steps to improve mental health services in the Northern Territory including the jurisdictions first mental health ward for juveniles. The court system was also supported with the addition of mental health workers as Court Clinicians. Elferink drove the introduction of the Northern Territory's first suicide action plan in an effort to reduce the Territory's tragically high suicide rate.

After supporting Willem Westra van Holthe's attempted party-room coup against Giles on 2 February, Elferink was named deputy leader of the CLP, putting him on track to become Deputy Chief Minister. This challenge was brought undone less than a day later, but Elferink remained in cabinet.

On 18 November 2015, Elferink announced that he would retire at the next election to be held in August 2016.

After announcing his retirement Elferink continued to pursue development for the NT in the surprising area of satellite launching capability with an Australian investor who wanted to buy the Sea Launch facility at Long Beach and bring it to Darwin. Elferink led the Northern Territory Government's mission in the negotiation processes.

Elferink's reforms include introducing the Northern Territory Corrections Industry banner and the Sentenced to a Job program that saw prisoners trained and skilled ready for the work place which they entered while still serving time. Chief Minister Adam Giles subsequently stated Elferink's role in prison reform should be applauded.

On 25 July 2016, footage of abuse to children as young as 13 years old within Darwin's Don Dale Youth Corrections Centre was aired in a Four Corners exclusive on the ABC. When Elferink was asked about the incidents by Four Corners journalists, he stated, in relation to the boy in the footage, Dylan Voller, that "Where there has even been a suggestion of criminality we've looked at it. Unfortunately these kids come into the system, these juveniles come into the system pre-broken and we have to cope with them, particularly when they are violent." The release of the footage resulted in the appointment of the Royal Commission into Juvenile Detention in the Northern Territory and the dismissal of Elferink as Corrections Minister on 26 July. He nevertheless retained all his other portfolios.

Subsequent to Elferink's removal from the role, Chief Minister Adam Giles described his decision to remove him as the "...wrong decision..." citing Elferink's hard work in the corrections field and accusing the ABC's Four Corners program of bias.

As a result of the Royal Commission no criminal charges were brought to bear against any individual. Elferink's criticism of the ABC's 4 Corners program became more pointed as a result as 4 Corners had alleged torture and barbarism. "We have acted and always acted when in government with absolute probity, something 4 Corners had explained to them at length, something they chose not to run with and as a consequence they put out a story saying that we tortured children, that we acted with barbarism in our hearts and it made comparisons to Abu Ghraib," Mr Elferink said. "All of those things are indictable offences, none of that was found to be true."

Elferink had ordered that Don Dale be shut down in 2014 and detainees were moved into a new facility. This was a direct response to the Vita review and incidents in the Don Dale facility. Elferink publicly released the Vita review without any legal demand that he do so in the interest of full disclosure. In 2013 Elferink had also attempted to introduce international inspectors into the Northern Territory Corrections system by introducing legislation to ratify OPCAT (Optional Protocol to the Convention Against Torture). In 2016 he was forced to withdraw the bill from the House as the Federal Parliament had failed to ratify their part of the arrangement.

In October 2018 the Parole Board of the NT reported Elferink's reform programs continued to bear fruit. The COMMIT program which Elferink championed and drove was recognised by the Parole Board of the NT as being a significant contributor to prisoner rehabilitation in the NT.

Throughout his political career Elferink remained open about the sexual abuse he'd suffered as a child. He always maintained his openness because he wanted to show people that a fully productive life was possible in spite of the challenges that people had to cope with from childhood. Elferink maintained the belief that waiting for perpetrator to apologise was to give that perpetrator ongoing power. "The moment you say to another person, 'I cannot be happy or complete until you apologise', you have given away your ability to be happy and handed it to a third party." he said.

=== Controversy ===
In 2015 Mr Elferink, then NT Attorney-General, reportedly told a Labor politician during a parliamentary debate he was "really tempted to give her a slap right now, figuratively speaking,". Mr Elferink apologised for his reaction saying the comment was "unwise" and only expressed it in the figurative sense meaning a rebuke.

== Post Politics ==
After politics, John Elferink moved to Adelaide in South Australia. There he established the Sabre Foundation to assist victims of sexual assault to pursue offenders using civil redress processes as well as a lawyer at Jones Elferink Barristers and Solicitors. He also lectures at the Indian Institute of Management (Rohtak) as a visiting lecturer in Labor Economics. He also works with the South Australian Dairyfarmers' Association (SADA) as a Policy Advisor while managing the SADA Fresh milk brand and industry fund on behalf of SADA.

== Personal ==
Elferink is married to Dee Elferink and has two daughters Eleanor and Gwenevere. He enjoys riding his Royal Enfield motorbike in his leisure time.

Northern Territory Legislative Assembly
Preceded by Neil Bell	Member for MacDonnell; 1997–2005	Succeeded by Alison Anderson
Preceded by Kerry Sacilotto	Member for Port Darwin; 2008–2016	Succeeded by Paul Kirby
Political offices
Preceded by Robyn Lambley	Treasurer of the Northern Territory; 2013	Succeeded by Dave Tollner
Preceded by Dave Tollner	Treasurer of the Northern Territory; 2014–2015	Succeeded by Adam Giles
