= Council for the Order of Australia =

The Council for the Order of Australia is the body responsible for recommending new appointments within the Order of Australia. It was established by letters patent issued by Queen Elizabeth II on the advice of Prime Minister Gough Whitlam on 14 February 1975. The prime minister of the day appoints the Council chair, and seven "community representatives", while each state and territory appoints a representative. In addition, there are three other ex officio members.

== Council members ==
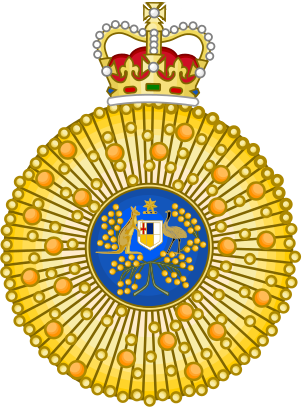
Insignia of a Knight and a Dame of the Order of Australia

Council members as at 7 August 2024:

Name	Notes
Chair
Shelley Reys AO	Nominated by the prime minister from existing members
Nominees of the prime minister
Annie Butler
Ellie Cole AM
Robyn Kruk AO
Malcolm McMillan
Helen Milroy AM
Rupert Myer AO
Samina Yasmeen AM
Nominees of the states and territories
Michael Miller LVO RFD	New South Wales
Jeremi Moule	Victoria
Filly Morgan PSM	Queensland
Rik Morris	South Australia
Kaylene Gulich	Western Australia
Kathrine Morgan-Wicks PSM	Tasmania
Kathy Leigh	Australian Capital Territory
Craig Kitchen MVO	Northern Territory
Ex-officio members
David Johnston AC RAN	Chief of the Defence Force
Katy Gallagher	Vice President of the Federal Executive Council
Andrew Walter	First Assistant Secretary, Government Division, Department of the Prime Minister and Cabinet
