= 2000 Solihull Metropolitan Borough Council election =

Local election in the UK

(1999 ←) 2000 United Kingdom local elections (→ 2002)

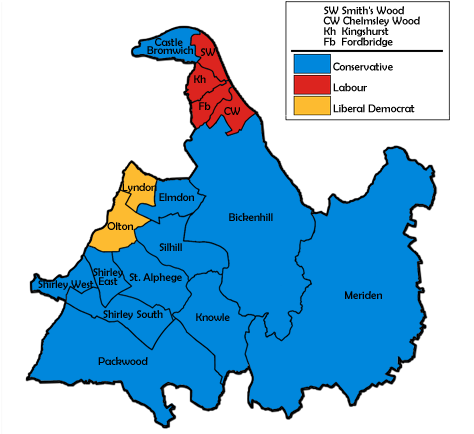
Map of the results for the 2000 Solihull council election.

The 2000 Solihull Metropolitan Borough Council election took place on 4 May 2000 to elect members of Solihull Metropolitan Borough Council in the West Midlands, England. One third of the council was up for election and the Conservative Party gained overall control of the council from no overall control.

== Campaign ==
Solihull was a top target for the Conservatives in the 2000 local elections with the party needing 2 gains to win an overall majority. Among the councillors defending seats in the election were the Conservative leader of the council in Castle Bromwich ward and the Labour group leader.

The Conservatives campaigned on promises to protect the green belt and carefully manage the council's finances, while the national party's hard line on asylum seekers was also seen by the party as helping in the election. Labour defended its strongholds in the north of the council area, pledging to target spending on addressing social problems in an area with high unemployment.

== Election result ==
The results saw the Conservatives win a majority of 5 on the council to have majority control for the first time since 1991. Solihull also became the first metropolitan borough with a Conservative majority since the mid-1990s. The Conservative gained Elmdon from the Labour Party, Packwood and Shirley East from the Liberal Democrats and Shirley South where an independent councillor stood down at the election. Meanwhile, the Labour group leader Mick Corser lost the election in Bickenhill after having been deselected in his previous ward of Fordbridge. Overall turnout in the election was 30.1%, a rise from 28.3% in 1999.

The Labour Party blamed the threatened closure of the Longbridge plant for a disappointing performance in the election, while the Conservatives put their success down to local campaigning and the national issue of pensions only going up by 75 pence. Following the election the former deputy group leader Hugh Hendry was elected as the new leader of the Labour group.

Solihull local election result 2000
Party	Seats	Gains	Losses	Net gain/loss	Seats %	Votes %	Votes	+/−
Conservative	11	4	0	+4	64.7	58.9	27,601	+7.9
Labour	4	0	1	-1	23.5	18.2	8,524	-5.3
Liberal Democrats	2	0	2	-2	11.8	22.6	10,608	-2.9
Independent Labour	0	0	0	0	0.0	0.3	158	+0.3

This result had the following consequences for the total number of seats on the council after the elections :

Party	Previous council	New council
Conservatives	24	28
Labour	15	14
Liberal Democrat	11	9
Independent Ratepayers & Residents	1	0
Total	51	51
Working majority	-3	5

== Ward results ==
Bickenhill
Party	Candidate	Votes	%	±%
Conservative	Robert Sleigh	2,070	66.0	+7.4
Labour	Michael Corser	854	27.2	−7.6
Liberal Democrats	Linda Whitlock	213	6.8	+0.1
Majority		1,216	38.8	+15.0
Turnout		3,137	31.5	+1.6
Conservative hold		Swing	+7.5	

Castle Bromwich
Party	Candidate	Votes	%	±%
Conservative	George Richards	2,149	74.7	+11.7
Labour	Florence Nash	518	18.0	−11.1
Liberal Democrats	John Knight	211	7.3	−0.6
Majority		1,631	56.7	+22.8
Turnout		2,878	30.4	+1.9
Conservative hold		Swing	+11.4	

Chelmsley Wood
Party	Candidate	Votes	%	±%
Labour	Alfred Hill	630	53.8	−12.7
Conservative	Graham Juniper	391	33.4	+9.7
Liberal Democrats	Jennifer Wright	149	12.7	+3.1
Majority		239	20.4	−22.4
Turnout		1,170	15.5	−0.2
Labour hold		Swing	-11.2	

Elmdon
Party	Candidate	Votes	%	±%
Conservative	James Wild	1,782	58.0	+5.3
Labour	Ann Littley	1,085	35.3	−1.6
Liberal Democrats	Anthony Verduyn	208	6.8	−3.7
Majority		697	22.7	+6.9
Turnout		3,075	38.2	+4.8
Conservative gain from Labour		Swing	+3.4	

Fordbridge
Party	Candidate	Votes	%	±%
Labour	Frederick Nash	436	48.7	−17.4
Conservative	Graham White	319	35.6	+10.8
Liberal Democrats	Christopher Hayes	140	15.6	+6.6
Majority		117	13.1	−28.2
Turnout		895	14.6	−0.7
Labour hold		Swing	-14.1	

Kingshurst
Party	Candidate	Votes	%	±%
Labour	Andrew Montgomerie	608	46.8	−14.6
Conservative	Martin Diggins	443	34.1	+5.0
Independent Labour	Brian Carter	158	12.2	+12.2
Liberal Democrats	Christine Reeves	89	6.9	−2.6
Majority		165	12.7	−19.6
Turnout		1,298	22.9	+2.2
Labour hold		Swing	-9.8	

Knowle
Party	Candidate	Votes	%	±%
Conservative	Leslie Kyles	2,306	73.4	+4.6
Liberal Democrats	Eric Widger	514	16.4	+1.3
Labour	Kevin Foster	320	10.2	−5.9
Majority		1,792	57.1	+4.4
Turnout		3,140	35.3	+3.2
Conservative hold		Swing	+1.7	

Lyndon
Party	Candidate	Votes	%	±%
Liberal Democrats	Irene Chamberlain	1,297	58.2	−1.5
Conservative	Alan Vincent	643	28.8	+4.5
Labour	Michael Weale	290	13.0	−3.0
Majority		654	29.3	−6.0
Turnout		2,230	28.6	−0.4
Liberal Democrats hold		Swing	-3.0	

Meriden
Party	Candidate	Votes	%	±%
Conservative	David Bell	2,061	69.0	+4.7
Labour	Jonathan Maltman	508	17.0	−4.2
Liberal Democrats	Peter Whitlock	417	14.0	−0.4
Majority		1,553	52.0	+8.9
Turnout		2,986	32.3	+2.0
Conservative hold		Swing	+4.4	

Olton
Party	Candidate	Votes	%	±%
Liberal Democrats	Norman Davies	1,734	50.8	−4.8
Conservative	Patricia Handslip	1,456	42.7	+6.4
Labour	Gerald Cooke	221	6.5	−1.6
Majority		278	8.2	−11.2
Turnout		3,411	35.9	+0.1
Liberal Democrats hold		Swing	-5.6	

Packwood
Party	Candidate	Votes	%	±%
Conservative	Andrzej Mackiewicz	2,515	56.1	+9.4
Liberal Democrats	Robert Reeves	1,752	39.1	−9.4
Labour	Margaret Brittin	218	4.9	−0.0
Majority		763	17.0	+15.2
Turnout		4,485	41.1	+2.4
Conservative gain from Liberal Democrats		Swing	+9.4	

Shirley East
Party	Candidate	Votes	%	±%
Conservative	Neill Watts	1,861	51.3	+6.7
Liberal Democrats	June Gandy	1,556	42.9	−2.1
Labour	Philip Knowles	212	5.8	−4.6
Majority		305	8.4	+7.9
Turnout		3,629	39.0	+4.4
Conservative gain from Liberal Democrats		Swing	+4.4	

Shirley South
Party	Candidate	Votes	%	±%
Conservative	Rosemary Worsley	2,325	67.3	+4.1
Labour	James Burman	626	18.1	−3.2
Liberal Democrats	Douglas Hogg	502	14.5	−0.9
Majority		1,699	49.2	+7.3
Turnout		3,453	26.2	+1.4
Conservative gain from Independent Ratepayers		Swing	+3.7	

Shirley West
Party	Candidate	Votes	%	±%
Conservative	Ian Hillas	1,694	63.0	+12.1
Labour	David George	617	22.9	−10.0
Liberal Democrats	Susan Reeve	379	14.1	−2.1
Majority		1,077	40.0	+22.0
Turnout		2,690	29.5	+0.9
Conservative hold		Swing	+11.0	

Silhill
Party	Candidate	Votes	%	±%
Conservative	Peter Hogarth	2,325	67.7	+13.5
Liberal Democrats	Barbara Harber	692	20.2	−12.6
Labour	Marcus Bennion	416	12.1	−0.8
Majority		1,633	47.6	+26.1
Turnout		3,433	33.7	+0.7
Conservative hold		Swing	+13.0	

Smith's Wood
Party	Candidate	Votes	%	±%
Labour	Graham Craig	605	55.0	−10.4
Conservative	Daniel Kettle	361	32.8	+9.3
Liberal Democrats	Sandra Oakes	135	12.3	+1.1
Majority		244	22.2	−19.7
Turnout		1,101	14.5	+0.2
Labour hold		Swing	-9.8	

St Alphege
Party	Candidate	Votes	%	±%
Conservative	Nicholas Worley	2,900	74.7	+4.0
Liberal Democrats	Brenda Chapple	620	16.0	−1.4
Labour	Irma Shaw	360	9.3	−2.6
Majority		2,280	58.8	+5.4
Turnout		3,880	34.5	−4.9
Conservative hold		Swing	+2.7	

== By-elections between 2000 and 2002 ==
Shirley East by-election 28 September 2000
Party	Candidate	Votes	%	±%
Conservative	Brian Burgess	1,194	49.0	−2.3
Liberal Democrats	June Gandy	1,116	45.8	+2.9
Labour	James Burman	128	5.3	−0.5
Majority		78	3.2	−5.2
Turnout		2,438	26.1	−12.9
Conservative gain from Liberal Democrats		Swing	-2.6	
