= 1996 Portuguese regional elections =

The Portuguese Autonomous Regions of Azores and Madeira held their own Regional Legislative election of 1996 on October 13.

In the Azores, there were 52 seats in the Regional Parliament in dispute, one more than in the previous election, in 1992. The seats were distributed by the 9 islands of the archipelago proportionally to the population of each island.

In Madeira, there were 59 seats in dispute, two more than in the previous election, distributed by the 11 municipalities of the archipelago proportionally to the population of each municipality.

The Socialist Party won the election in Azores for the first time, gathering 45% of the voting and electing Carlos César to the presidency of the Regional Government, after 20 years of dominance by the Social Democratic Party.

In Madeira, Alberto João Jardim, of the Social Democratic Party kept his dominance over the regional political panorama, winning the election with an absolute majority of 57%, the 6th consecutive absolute majority since the very first election in 1976.

== The election in Azores ==
The winner of the election was the Socialist Party, that for the first time, achieved the majority of the voting, receiving, however, the same number of MPs as the Social Democratic Party. It was an historical victory for the socialists, after 20 years of dominance by the right-wing Social Democratic Party. Carlos Manuel Martins do Vale César became the new president of the Regional Government, succeeding to Alberto Romão Madruga da Costa.

The Democratic Alliance of Azores lost its single MP and the People's Party, that did not participated in the last election, managed to elect 3 MPs after receiving more than 7% of the voting.

On the left, the Unitary Democratic Coalition, led by the Portuguese Communist Party re-elected its MP, after winning the election in the island of Flores. The People's Democratic Union did not manage to elect a single MP.

=== Summary of votes and seats ===
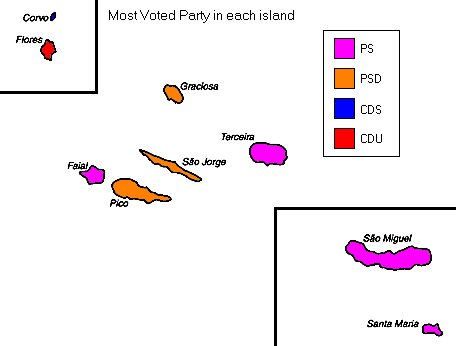
The most voted party in each island

Summary of the 13 October 1996 Legislative Assembly of Azores elections results
Parties	Votes	%	±pp swing	MPs					MPs %/ votes %
Parties	Votes	%	±pp swing	1992	1996	±	%	±	MPs %/ votes %
PS	51,906	45.82	▲9.4	21	24	▲3	46.15	▲5.0	1.01
PSD	46,449	41.00	▼12.6	28	24	▼4	46.15	▼8.7	1.13
CDS–PP^{[A]}	8,346	7.37	—	1	3	▲2	5.77	▲3.8	0.78
CDU	3,940	3.48	▲1.2	1	1	0	1.92	▼0.1	0.55
People's Democratic Union	983	0.87	—	—	0	—	0.00	—	0.0
Democratic Party of the Atlantic	340	0.30	▼1.1	0	0	0	0.00	0.0	0.0
Total valid	111,964	98.83	▲0.5	51	52	▲1	100.00	0.0	—
Blank ballots	705	0.62	▲0.1						
Invalid ballots	624	0.55	▼0.6						
Total (turnout 59.17%)	113,293	100.00	▼3.0						
^{A} The People's Party contested the 1992 election in an alliance formed by the People's Party (1 seat) and the People's Monarchist; Party (0 seats).
Source: Comissão Nacional de Eleições Archived 2012-05-16 at the Wayback Machine

== The election in Madeira ==
The winner of the election in Madeira was, once more, the Social Democratic Party, and Alberto João Jardim was elected president of the Regional Government with an absolute majority for the 6th consecutive time. The percentage gathered by the social democrats was virtually the same of the previous election, however, due to the populational growth of the region, the number of MPs was increased from 57 to 59, and so, the social democrats gained 2 MPs, achieving a total of 41.

The People's Party lost some of its voters, but still managed to keep the 2 MPs, unlike the National Solidarity Party that lost its single MP.

On the left, the Socialist Party increased the voting by 1% and received one more MP. The Unitary Democratic Coalition, led by the Portuguese Communist Party, increased the voting and the number of MPs, stealing one MP from the People's Democratic Union that elected only 1 MP.

=== Summary of votes and seats ===
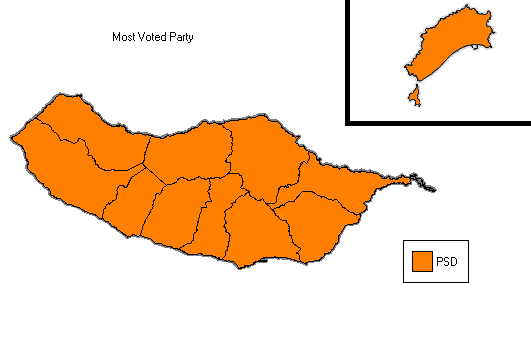
The most voted party in each municipality

Summary of the 13 October 1996 Legislative Assembly of Madeira elections results
Parties	Votes	%	±pp swing	MPs					MPs %/ votes %
Parties	Votes	%	±pp swing	1992	1996	±	%	±	MPs %/ votes %
PSD	77,365	56.87	▲0.0	39	41	▲2	69.49	▲1.1	1.22
PS	33,790	24.84	▲2.3	12	13	▲1	22.03	▲0.9	0.89
CDS–PP	9,950	7.31	▼0.8	2	2	0	3.39	▼0.1	0.46
CDU	5,495	4.04	▲1.0	1	2	▲1	3.39	▲1.6	0.84
People's Democratic Union	5,485	4.03	▼0.6	2	1	▼1	1.69	▼1.8	0.42
National Solidarity Party	875	0.64	▼1.8	1	0	▼1	0.00	▼1.8	0.0
Democratic Party of the Atlantic	565	0.42	▼0.2	0	0	0	0.00	0.0	0.0
Total valid	133,525	98.14	▲0.1	57	59	▲2	100.00	0.0	—
Blank ballots	991	0.73	▲0.0						
Invalid ballots	1,534	1.13	▼0.2						
Total (turnout 65.26%)	136,050	100.00	▼1.2						
Source: Comissão Nacional de Eleições Archived 2012-04-26 at the Wayback Machine

== See also ==
- Azores
- Madeira
