= Results breakdown of the 2000 Canadian federal election =

2000 Canadian federal election

== Results by Province and Territory ==
=== Alberta ===
Results in Alberta
Party	Seats	Second	Third	Fourth	Fifth	Sixth	Seventh	Votes	%	+/-
Alliance	23	3						739,514	58.88	
Liberals	2	17	7					263,008	20.94	
Progressive Conservative	1	6	16	3				169,093	13.46	
NDP			3	22	1			68,363	5.44	
Green					6	1		6,320	0.5	
No affiliation to a recognised party				1	1	1		3,262	0.26	
Marijuana					3			2,505	0.2	
Canadian Action					1	4		1,265	0.1	
Independent					1	1		1,201	0.1	
Natural Law					1	1	1	506	0.04	
Marxist-Leninist						1	2	491	0.04	
Communist					1	1	1	471	0.04	
Total	26							1,255,999	100.0	

=== British Columbia ===
Results in British Columbia
Party	Seats	Second	Third	Fourth	Fifth	Sixth	Seventh	Eighth	Ninth	Tenth	Votes	%	+/-
Alliance	27	6	1								797,519	49.39	
Liberals	5	27	2								446,574	27.66	
NDP	2	1	19	12							182,993	11.33	
Progressive Conservative			12	21	1						117,614	7.28	
Green				1	20	2	1				34,294	2.12	
Canadian Action					6	4	8				12,894	0.8	
Marijuana					3	9					11,611	0.72	
No affiliation to a recognised party					1	6	2	2	1	2	3,415	0.21	
Independent					1	1	1	3			2,693	0.17	
Natural Law						3	6	3		2	2,362	0.15	
Communist					1	2	3	2	3		1,547	0.1	
Marxist-Leninist						1	3	4	3	1	1,156	0.07	
Total	34										1,614,672	100.0	

=== Manitoba ===
Results in Manitoba
Party	Seats	Second	Third	Fourth	Fifth	Sixth	Seventh	Eighth	Votes	%	+/-
Liberals	5	7	2						158,713	32.53	
Alliance	4	6	2	1					148,293	30.4	
NDP	4		6	3	1				101,741	20.86	
Progressive Conservative	1	1	4	8					70,635	14.48	
Independent				1	1		1		3,859	0.79	
Communist				1	2	1	1	2	1,277	0.26	
Green					3				1,159	0.24	
Canadian Action					1	2			782	0.16	
No affiliation to a recognised party					1	3	1		733	0.15	
Marijuana					1				640	0.13	
Total	14								487,832	100.0	

=== New Brunswick ===
Results in New Brunswick
Party	Seats	Second	Third	Fourth	Fifth	Sixth	Seventh	Votes	%	+/-
Liberals	6	4						159,803	41.72	
Progressive Conservative	3	5	2					116,980	30.54	
Alliance		1	7	2				60,277	15.74	
NDP	1		1	8				44,778	11.69	
Natural Law					2		1	582	0.15	
Marijuana					1			461	0.12	
Green						1		131	0.03	
Total	10							383,012	100.0	

=== Newfoundland and Labrador ===
Results in Newfoundland and Labrador
Party	Seats	Second	Third	Fourth	Fifth	Sixth	Votes	%	+/-
Liberals	5	2					103,103	44.93	
Progressive Conservative	2	2	3				79,157	34.49	
NDP		2	4		1		29,993	13.07	
Alliance				7			8,837	3.85	
No affiliation to a recognised party		1					7,891	3.44	
Natural Law					1	1	263	0.11	
Independent					1		254	0.11	
Total	7						229,498	100.0	

=== Northwest Territories ===
Results in Northwest Territories
Party	Seats	Second	Third	Fourth	Votes	%	+/-
Liberals	1				5,855	45.6	
NDP		1			3,430	26.71	
Alliance			1		2,273	17.7	
Progressive Conservative				1	1,282	9.98	
Total	1				12,840	100.0	

=== Nova Scotia ===
Results in Nova Scotia
Party	Seats	Second	Third	Fourth	Fifth	Sixth	Seventh	Eighth	Votes	%	+/-
Liberals	4	7							158,870	36.5	
Progressive Conservative	4	2	5						126,581	29.08	
NDP	3	2	3	3					104,277	23.96	
Alliance			3	8					41,750	9.59	
Marijuana					3				1,954	0.45	
Independent					1	1			692	0.16	
Green						1			587	0.13	
Marxist-Leninist					2		1		359	0.08	
Natural Law							1		133	0.03	
Communist								1	85	0.02	
Total	11								435,288	100.0	

=== Nunavut ===
Results in Nunavut
Party	Seats	Second	Third	Fourth	Votes	%	+/-
Liberals	1				5,327	69.01	
NDP		1			1,410	18.27	
Progressive Conservative			1		633	8.2	
Green				1	349	4.52	
Total	1				7,719	100.0	

=== Ontario ===
Results in Ontario
Party	Seats	Second	Third	Fourth	Fifth	Sixth	Seventh	Eighth	Ninth	Tenth	Votes	%	+/-
Liberals	100	3									2,292,069	51.48	
Alliance	2	80	16	5							1,051,209	23.61	
Progressive Conservative		10	73	16	1						642,438	14.43	
NDP	1	9	14	79							368,709	8.28	
Green					48	4					39,737	0.89	
No affiliation to a recognised party		1			9	10	2	2	1		20,577	0.46	
Marijuana				2	8	12					13,379	0.3	
Canadian Action					10	13	13	3			10,974	0.25	
Marxist-Leninist					6	13	8	4	3	6	4,798	0.11	
Natural Law					5	4	6	6	4	1	3,734	0.08	
Communist				1	1	3	4	4	5		2,614	0.06	
Independent					2	4	2	1			2,361	0.05	
Total	103										4,452,599	100.0	

=== Prince Edward Island ===
Results in Prince Edward Island
Party	Seats	Second	Third	Fourth	Fifth	Sixth	Votes	%	+/-
Liberals	4						35,021	47.03	
Progressive Conservative		4					28,610	38.42	
NDP			2	2			6,714	9.02	
Alliance			2	2			3,719	4.99	
Green					1		250	0.34	
Natural Law					1		92	0.12	
No affiliation to a recognised party						1	58	0.08	
Total	4						74,464	100.0	

=== Quebec ===
Results in Quebec
Party	Seats	Second	Third	Fourth	Fifth	Sixth	Seventh	Eighth	Ninth	Tenth	Votes	%	+/-
Liberals	36	38	1								1,529,642	44.25	
Bloc Québécois	38	34	2	1							1,377,727	39.85	
Alliance			46	23	2	1	2				212,874	6.16	
Progressive Conservative	1	3	23	40	3	1					192,153	5.56	
NDP				7	33	29	3				63,611	1.84	
Marijuana				3	18	5	4	1			35,708	1.03	
Green			2		7	8					19,846	0.57	
Natural Law					7	4	4	3		1	8,905	0.26	
Independent			1	1			2	2			6,385	0.18	
Marxist-Leninist						4	9	7	5	1	5,269	0.15	
Communist						3	3	5	1		2,782	0.08	
No affiliation to a recognised party							1	2	4		1,597	0.05	
Canadian Action							1		1		399	0.01	
Total	75										3,456,898	100.0	

=== Saskatchewan ===
Results in Saskatchewan
Party	Seats	Second	Third	Fourth	Fifth	Sixth	Votes	%	+/-
Alliance	10	4					207,004	47.73	
NDP	2	8	4				113,626	26.2	
Liberals	2	2	10				89,697	20.68	
Progressive Conservative				11			20,855	4.81	
Green					4		1,726	0.4	
Canadian Action				1	1	1	789	0.18	
Total	14						433,697	100.0	

=== Yukon ===
Results in Yukon
Party	Seats	Second	Third	Fourth	Fifth	Votes	%	+/-
Liberals	1					4,293	32.48	
NDP		1				4,223	31.95	
Alliance			1			3,659	27.68	
Progressive Conservative				1		991	7.5	
No affiliation to a recognised party					1	53	0.4	
Total	1					13,219	100.0	
