= Electoral division of Port Darwin =

Electoral division of the Northern Territory, Australia

Port Darwin Northern Territory—Legislative Assembly
- Interactive map of boundaries as of the 2024 election
- Territory: Northern Territory
- Created: 1974
- MP: Robyn Cahill
- Party: Country Liberal
- Namesake: Port Darwin
- Electors: 5,645 (2026)
- Area: 5 km^{2} (1.9 sq mi)
- Demographic: Urban
Electorates around Port Darwin:
Timor Sea	Fannie Bay	Fong Lim
Timor Sea	Port Darwin	Darwin Harbour
Timor Sea	Darwin Harbour	Darwin Harbour

Port Darwin is an electoral division of the Legislative Assembly in the Northern Territory of Australia. It was first created in 1974. It is an entirely urban electorate, covering only 5 km² and taking in the Darwin central business district, as well as the suburb of Larrakeyah and part of Stuart Park. There were 5,645 people enrolled in the electorate as of July 2026.

Unlike most state and territory electorates based on CBDs, Port Darwin historically tilted conservative. For most of the first four decades of its existence, Port Darwin was a safe seat for the Country Liberal Party. While it was one of only two seats the party did not hold in the first parliament from 1974 to 1977, the CLP easily took the seat at the Territory's second election and held it without serious difficulty for over a quarter century. It was widely considered as CLP heartland, and was their safest seat in Darwin for many years.

The strength of the CLP vote in the seat was seen at the 2000 by-election caused by the resignation of controversial former Chief Minister Shane Stone. While the by-election was called at a very bad time for the CLP, Sue Carter managed to easily fend off any challenge in the seat.

Carter retained her seat even as Territory Labor won its first victory at the 2001 election. She suffered a swing of just over 10 percent, making Port Darwin marginal for the first time in almost a quarter century. Large Labor gains in the Darwin area left Carter as the only CLP member west of Palmerston, and the only one in the capital. Despite this, there were very few signs in the lead-up to the 2005 election that she was in danger, with most commentators expecting her to win another term. However, on election day, there was a surprise significant and unprecedented swing to the ALP across the Territory. Though the result was so close that it was not known for several days after the election, Carter was ultimately defeated by Labor opponent Kerry Sacilotto by 73 votes. Sacilotto actually won just enough primary votes to take the seat without the need for preferences. She held the seat for only one term, until when John Elferink regained the seat for the CLP at the 2008 election.

Elferink seemingly consolidated his hold on the seat in 2012. However, he retired ahead of the 2016 election. At that election, the CLP lost over 12.9 percent of its primary vote amid its collapse in the Darwin/Palmerston area, allowing Paul Kirby to become only the second Labor member to win it. Kirby successfully retained the seat four years later. He retired in 2024, and Robyn Cahill easily reclaimed the seat for the CLP on a swing large enough to make it a safe CLP seat in one stroke.

== Members for Port Darwin ==
Member	Party	Term
Ron Withnall	Independent	1974–1977
Tom Harris	Country Liberal	1977–1990
Shane Stone	Country Liberal	1990–2000
Sue Carter	Country Liberal	2000–2005
Kerry Sacilotto	Labor	2005–2008
John Elferink	Country Liberal	2008–2016
Paul Kirby	Labor	2016–2024
Robyn Cahill	Country Liberal	2024–present

== Election results ==
2024 Northern Territory general election: Port Darwin
Party	Candidate	Votes	%	±%
Country Liberal	Robyn Cahill	2,149	52.2	+14.4
Labor	Brian Manning	972	23.6	−13.9
Greens	Greg Dickson	681	16.5	+9.2
Independent	Leah Potter	234	5.7	+0.8
Independent	Janey Davies	83	2.0	+2.0
Total formal votes		4,119	97.1	−0.4
Informal votes		121	2.9	+0.4
Turnout		4,240	74.0	
Two-party-preferred result
Country Liberal	Robyn Cahill	2,543	61.7	+13.7
Labor	Brian Manning	1,576	38.3	−13.7
Country Liberal gain from Labor		Swing	+13.7	
