= Shane Stone =

Australian politician

The Honourable Shane Stone AC, KC
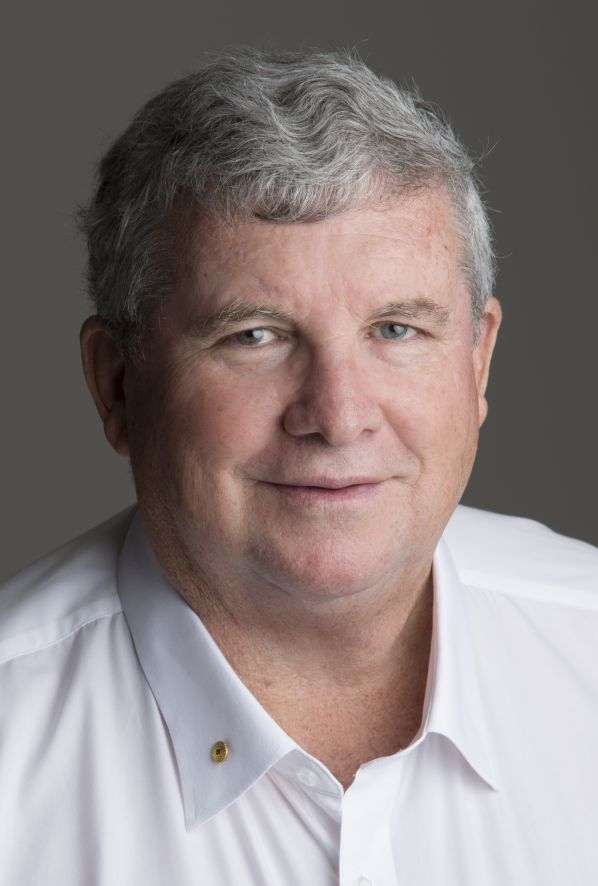
- Stone in 2018

President of the Country Liberal Party
- In office 9 October 2023 – 16 February 2025
- Leader: Lia Finocchiaro
- Preceded by: Lawson Broad
- Succeeded by: Natasha Griggs

Chair of the Council for the Order of Australia
- In office 1 February 2018 – 25 January 2023
- Preceded by: Sir Angus Houston
- Succeeded by: Shelley Reys

Coordinator-General of the National Recovery and Resilience Agency
- In office 5 May 2021 – 31 August 2022
- Preceded by: Agency created
- Succeeded by: Agency abolished

5th Chief Minister of the Northern Territory
- In office 26 May 1995 – 8 February 1999
- Deputy: Mike Reed
- Preceded by: Marshall Perron
- Succeeded by: Denis Burke

Member of the Northern Territory Legislative Assembly for Port Darwin
- In office 1990 – 21 February 2000
- Preceded by: Tom Harris
- Succeeded by: Sue Carter

President of the Liberal Party of Australia
- In office 1 July 1999 – 25 June 2005
- Leader: John Howard
- Preceded by: Tony Staley
- Succeeded by: Chris McDiven

Personal details
- Born: 25 September 1950 (age 75) Bendigo, Victoria
- Party: Country Liberal Party / Liberal Party

Shane Leslie Stone AC, KC (born 25 September 1950) is an Australian politician. He is a member and former leader of the Country Liberal Party, and was the Chief Minister of the Northern Territory between May 1995 and February 1999. Stone has served as the president of the party on multiple occasions, most recently from October 2023 to February 2025.

Stone served as the Chair of the Council for the Order of Australia from 2018 to 2023. He was also the Coordinator-General of the National Recovery and Resilience Agency and its predecessors until August 2022. He was also the federal president of the Liberal Party of Australia (affiliate of the Country Library Party) between July 1999 and 2005.

== Political career ==
=== 1990s ===
First elected to the Northern Territory Legislative Assembly Electoral division of Port Darwin as a member of the Country Liberal Party (CLP) in 1990, Stone held several portfolios, including Attorney-General, Education and the Arts, Employment and Training, Mines and Energy, Industries and Development, and Asian Relations and Trade. In late 1997 Stone attracted sustained criticism when as the First Law Officer being the Attorney-General he appointed himself a Queen's Counsel.

Stone was the Chief Minister during the referendum for statehood for the Northern Territory in 1998. Electors were asked to vote on whether the Northern Territory should become a state with a constitution that had been approved by a Constitutional Assembly. A bipartisan committee of the Northern Territory Legislative Assembly had recommended a constitution and that it should be further considered by an elected Constitutional Assembly. The CLP Government put forward a different constitution to a non-elected Constitutional Assembly. The referendum failed narrowly. The following year Stone resigned as Chief Minister; 18 months later the CLP under Denis Burke lost the next Territory election after 27 years in power. In 1999 he became the federal President of the Liberal Party of Australia, and was appointed a Commander of the Order of Kinabalu by the Malaysian state of Sabah.

=== 2000s ===
In 2001 he wrote a memo, later leaked to the press, that suggested that the government of John Howard was seen as "mean and tricky". The ensuing controversy quickly mushroomed, with Stone and Howard both being accused of leaking the memo.

Stone is the Executive Chairman of the APAC Group of Companies. He was the National Chairman of the Duke of Edinburgh's International Award - Australia from 2012 to 2018. He is currently an Award Ambassador. Awarded the Centenary Medal in 2001, Stone was appointed a Companion of the Order of Australia in the 2006 Queen's Birthday Honours for his service to politics, industry, and bi-lateral relations between Australia and the Asia-Pacific region. In 2018, Stone was appointed chair of the Council for the Order of Australia. In 2019 he was presented with the Gold Distinguished Service Medal, The Duke of Edinburgh's International Award – Australia, this being the highest level of recognition made by the Award in Australia. The award was made by Prince Edward, Earl of Wessex.

=== 2020s ===
In March 2019, he was appointed by Prime Minister Scott Morrison as head of the North Queensland Livestock Industry Recovery Agency following the North Queensland floods. In December 2019, North Queensland Livestock Industry Recovery Agency was expanded to include drought and renamed into a new National Drought and North Queensland Flood Response and Recovery Agency, with Stone appointed the Coordinator-General of the new agency. The agency was further subsumed into the National Recovery and Resilience Agency (NRRA) on 5 May 2021 and Stone continued to be the Coordinator-General of the new agency. During the Queensland and New South Wales floods in March 2022, Stone suggested inundated homes in flood-prone areas should not be rebuilt, and residents of flood-prone areas needed to "face realities". He was criticised by the opposition Labor Party for being "insensitive to those who had lost properties and livelihoods" and should be sacked for "victim blaming".

Following Labor's victory at the May 2022 federal election, in July 2022, the new Albanese government announced the merger of the NRRA and the Emergency Management Australia on 1 September 2022 to form the National Emergency Management Agency (NEMA). Following the announcement, Stone took leave and left the NRRA on 31 August.

After his departure from the NRRA, Stone was elected as the president of the Country Liberal Party in October 2023. During his presidency, the party won the 2024 Northern Territory general election.

== Arms ==
Coat of arms of Shane Stone

Notes
Granted by the College of Arms, 26 January 2008
Crest
A white breasted sea eagle wings elevated and addorsed Proper grasping with its talons a Barramundi Azure.
Torse
Argent and Gules.
Escutcheon
Argent a lion rampant Gules crowned Or the rear legs shackled Azure holding in the dexter forepaw a sprig of wWattle Proper.
Motto
Strength Honour Service
Badge
An Australian green tree frog Proper.

Northern Territory Legislative Assembly
Preceded by Tom Harris	Member for Port Darwin; 1990–2000	Succeeded by Sue Carter
Political offices
Preceded by Marshall Perron	Chief Minister of the Northern Territory; 1995–1999	Succeeded by Denis Burke
Party political offices
Preceded by Marshall Perron	Leader of the Country Liberal Party; 1995–1999	Succeeded by Denis Burke
Preceded by Tony Staley	President of the Liberal Party of Australia; 1999–2005	Succeeded by Chris McDiven
Preceded by Lawson Broad	President of the Country Liberal Party; 2023–present	Incumbent
