= 2000 Port Darwin by-election =

By-election in the Northern Territory, Australia

- 11 March 2000
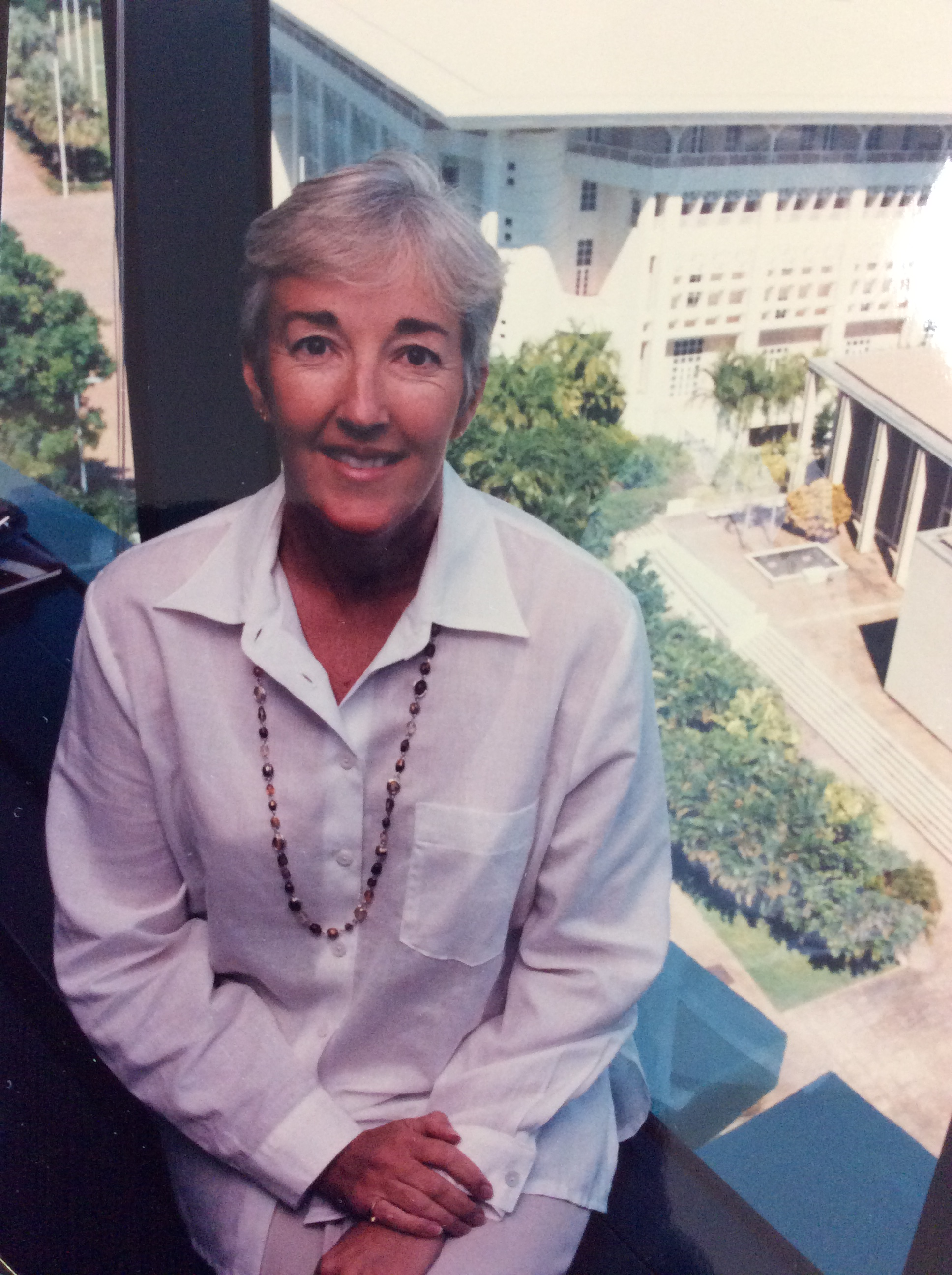

	First party	Second party	Third party
			IND
Candidate	Sue Carter	Ian Fraser	Susan Bradley
Party	Country Liberal	Labor	Independent
Popular vote	1,694	873	551
Percentage	51.0%	26.3%	16.6%
Swing	▼13.4pp	▲0.7pp	▲16.6pp
TPP	61.2%	38.8%
TPP swing	▼5.8pp	▲5.8pp
MP before election
Shane Stone
Country Liberal
Elected MP
Sue Carter
Country Liberal

A by-election for the seat of Port Darwin in the Northern Territory Legislative Assembly was held on 11 March 2000. The by-election was triggered by the resignation of former CLP Chief Minister Shane Stone. The seat had been held by Stone since 1990.

The CLP selected Sue Carter as its candidate. The Labor candidate was Ian Fraser. Former Labor candidate for Fannie Bay Susan Bradley contested as an independent.

== Results ==
Port Darwin by-election, 2000
Party	Candidate	Votes	%	±%
Country Liberal	Sue Carter	1,694	51.0	−13.4
Labor	Ian Fraser	873	26.3	+0.7
Independent	Susan Bradley	551	16.6	+16.6
Greens	Andy Gough	202	6.1	+6.1
Total formal votes		3,319	95.7	+1.2
Informal votes		113	4.3	−1.2
Turnout		3,432	70.5	−13.8
Two-party-preferred result
Country Liberal	Sue Carter	2,031	61.2	−5.8
Labor	Ian Fraser	1,288	38.8	+5.8
Country Liberal hold		Swing	–5.8	
